= 2025 Los Angeles Rams season =

88th season in franchise history

- Owner: Stan Kroenke
- General manager: Les Snead
- Head coach: Sean McVay
- Offensive coordinator: Mike LaFleur
- Defensive coordinator: Chris Shula
- Home stadium: SoFi Stadium

Results
- Record: 12–5
- Division place: 2nd NFC West
- Playoffs: Won Wild Card Playoffs (at Panthers) 34–31; Won Divisional Playoffs (at Bears) 20–17 (OT); Lost NFC Championship (at Seahawks) 27–31
- All-Pros: WR Puka Nacua (1st team); QB Matthew Stafford (1st team)
- Pro Bowlers: WR Puka Nacua; QB Matthew Stafford; OLB Jared Verse; OLB Byron Young

Uniform
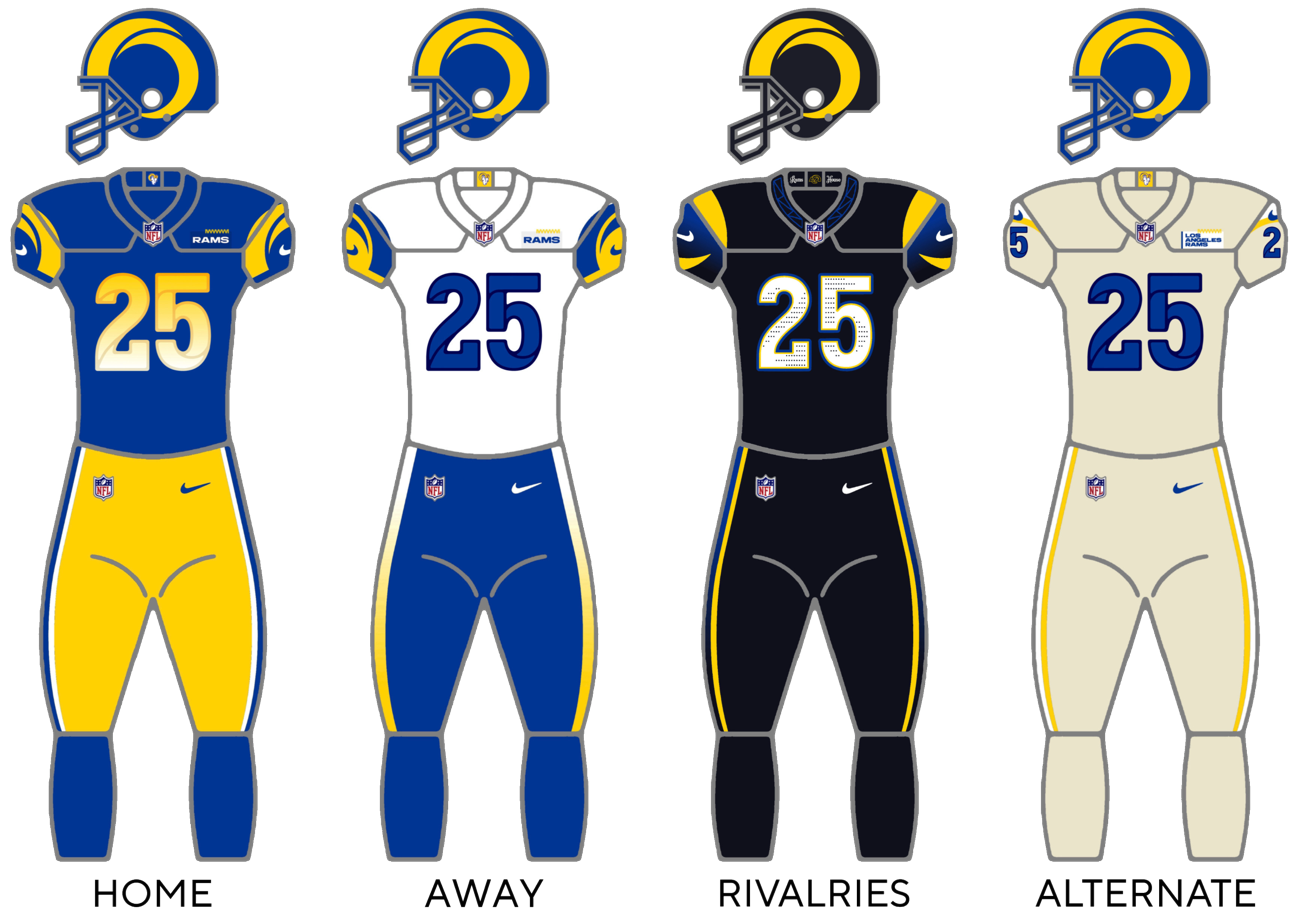

The 2025 season was the Los Angeles Rams' 88th in the National Football League (NFL), their 89th overall, 59th in the Greater Los Angeles Area, sixth playing their home games at SoFi Stadium and their ninth under head coach Sean McVay. This was the first season since 2016 not to feature longtime wide receiver Cooper Kupp, as he was released during the offseason and signed by the division rival Seattle Seahawks. The team's 11–4 start was their best since they started 12–3 in their 2018 season. The Rams clinched their third consecutive winning season (and their eighth in nine years) after a 34–7 win over the Tampa Bay Buccaneers in Week 12. Los Angeles secured its third consecutive playoff appearance, and seventh in nine seasons under McVay, with a Week 15 win over the Detroit Lions. However, the Rams failed to defend their NFC West title following an overtime loss to Seattle in Week 16 followed with wins by both the Seahawks and San Francisco 49ers in Week 17.

In the playoffs, the Rams defeated the NFC South champion and No. 4 seed Carolina Panthers 34–31 in the Wild Card round. The Rams then beat the No. 2 seeded Chicago Bears, champions of the NFC North, 20–17 in overtime in the divisional round to advance to their third NFC Championship Game appearance in eight seasons. There, they faced the top-seeded rival Seattle Seahawks, champions of the NFC West, but were ultimately defeated by the eventual Super Bowl LX champions by a final score of 31–27.

The Rams were the only team to score above 500 points during the regular season. Defensively, the team was also respectable, allowing the 10th-fewest points in the league. Los Angeles finished with a +172 point differential, which was second to only Seattle's and a little better than that of the AFC Champion New England Patriots. The Rams also gained a reputation for being one of the most difficult teams to beat in the NFL, as they only lost two games, regular season and postseason, by more than three points, in which the loss in the regular season came in Week 3 against the defending champion Philadelphia Eagles, who blocked a game-winning field goal attempt by the Rams and returned it for a meaningless touchdown that padded the margin of victory. All the while, the Rams played in a division with two other playoff teams, faced one of the more challenging schedules in the NFL, and tied for the highest strength-of-victory in football. For these reasons, Pro Football Reference's Simple Rating System and ESPN's Football Power Index rated the Rams as the second-strongest team in the NFL during the season.

Despite the strong season, the team was undone by shaky special teams play in four of their six losses, including the aforementioned defeat in Philadelphia and both critical losses against Seattle. Several sources described this season's special teams unit as a fatal flaw that prevented Los Angeles from adding another championship during the highly successful McVay-Snead era.

The Los Angeles Rams drew an average home attendance of 69,736, the 16th-highest of all NFL teams.

== Offseason ==
=== Coaching changes ===
- Nick Caley, who had served as tight ends coach for the previous two seasons and added the title of pass game coordinator in 2024, left the Rams after being hired by the Houston Texans to serve as their offensive coordinator.
- Drew Wilkins, who had previously been outside linebackers coach for the New York Giants and the New England Patriots, was hired by the Rams as pass rush coordinator.
- The Rams hired Scott Huff, most recently offensive line coach of the Seattle Seahawks, as the team's new tight ends coach, succeeding the departed Nick Caley.
- Jimmy Lake, who had previously served as an assistant head coach for the Rams during the 2023 season, returned to the team as a senior defensive assistant. In 2024, he had served as defensive coordinator of the Atlanta Falcons.
- Longtime NFL assistant coach Alex Van Pelt, who had most recently served as offensive coordinator with the New England Patriots, was hired as a senior offensive assistant.
- Former Denver Broncos specials teams coordinator Ben Kotwica was hired to the Rams staff as an assistant special teams coach. On December 20, 2025, Kotwica was elevated to interim special teams coordinator after his predecessor Chase Blackburn was fired following the Rams' overtime loss to Seattle in Week 16.
- Matt Harper, who had previously served as assistant special teams coach for the Philadelphia Eagles and San Francisco 49ers, was hired by the Rams staff to fill the same role after Kotwica was promoted to interim special teams coach.

=== Team headquarters and practice training facility ===
In April 2025, the Rams franchise announced detailed plans for the development of the Kroenke Warner Center complex in Woodland Hills, to be re-christened as Rams Village at Warner Center. The plans to develop the 100-acre complex include a permanent practice and training facility to replace the temporary one currently in use since 2024 and a new team headquarters along with a 52-acre neighborhood for mixed use development. To be designed by the renowned Gensler global design and architecture firm, development of Rams Village at Warner Center is expected to begin no earlier than 2027 with project completion estimated for 2037.

=== Players added ===
Position	Player	Former team	Date
WR	Davante Adams	New York Jets	March 9
C	Coleman Shelton	Chicago Bears	March 13
LB	Nate Landman	Atlanta Falcons	March 18

=== Players lost ===
Position	Player	New team	Date
WR	Cooper Kupp	Seattle Seahawks	March 12
TE	Hunter Long	Jacksonville Jaguars	March 12
ILB	Christian Rozeboom	Carolina Panthers	March 12
WR	Demarcus Robinson	San Francisco 49ers	March 13
OLB	Michael Hoecht	Buffalo Bills	March 14
WR	Tyler Johnson	New York Jets	March 15
RT	Joe Noteboom	Baltimore Ravens	May 3

=== "Mauicamp" ===
On May 7, 2025, the Rams franchise announced in a press conference that they would be holding part of their annual minicamp in Wailuku, Hawaii from June 16–19, to be entitled "Mauicamp". In addition to team practices at War Memorial Stadium, football clinics were held for local boys and girls, while Rams rookies and team employees traveled to Lahaina, a community badly stricken by the 2023 Hawaii wildfires, where they worked with Habitat for Humanity in the construction of houses. Additionally, the team announced that it was co-sponsoring the renovation of locker rooms at Lahainaluna High School.

=== Draft ===
2025 Los Angeles Rams draft selections
Round	Selection	Player	Position	College	Notes
1	26	Traded to the Atlanta Falcons (Note: The Falcons traded a second-round selection (46th overall), a seventh round selection (242nd overall) and a 2026 first round selection in exchange for the 26th overall pick and a third round selection (101st overall))			
2	46	Terrance Ferguson	TE	Oregon	From Atlanta Falcons
2	57	Traded to the Carolina Panthers (Note: The Rams traded a second-round selection, and 2024 second- and fifth-round selections (52nd and 155th overall) to the Carolina Panthers in exchange for a 2024 second-round selection (39th overall).)			
3	90	Josaiah Stewart	OLB	Michigan	
3	101	Traded to the Atlanta Falcons			2020 Resolution JC-2A selection (Note: The Rams received a third-round selection after the Atlanta Falcons hired former Rams defensive coordinator Raheem Morris as head coach.)
4	117	Jarquez Hunter	RB	Auburn	From Indianapolis
4	127	Traded to the Indianapolis Colts			
5	148	Ty Hamilton	NT	Ohio State	
5	162	Traded to the Pittsburgh Steelers (Note: The Rams traded a fifth-round selection and a 2024 fourth-round selection to the Pittsburgh Steelers in exchange for a sixth-round selection, a 2024 fifth-round selection and G Kevin Dotson.)			
5	172	Chris Paul Jr.	ILB	Ole Miss	From Vikings
6	190	Traded to the Indianapolis Colts			From Falcons (Note: The Rams traded a seventh-round selection and WR Van Jefferson to the Atlanta Falcons in exchange for a sixth-round selection.)
6	195	Traded to the Chicago Bears			From Steelers
6	201	Traded to the Minnesota Vikings			
6	202	Traded to the Minnesota Vikings			From Texans via Steelers and Bears (Note: The Rams traded G Jonah Jackson to the Chicago Bears in exchange for a sixth-round selection (202nd overall).)
7	242	Konata Mumpfield	WR	Pittsburgh	From Atlanta Falcons

Draft trades

2025 Los Angeles Rams undrafted free agents
Name	Position	College	Ref.
Wyatt Bowles	G	Utah State	
Malik Dixon-Williams	S	UConn	
Shaun Dolac	ILB	Buffalo	
Ben Dooley	OT	Boise State	
Tru Edwards	WR	Louisiana Tech	
Willie Lampkin	G	North Carolina	
Jamil Muhammad	OLB	USC	
Bill Norton	DL	Texas	
Josh Pearcy	OLB	Rice	
Brennan Presley	WR	Oklahoma State	
Mark Redman	TE	Louisville	
Da'Jon Terry	NT	Oklahoma	
Anthony Torres	TE	Toledo	
Nate Valcarcel	S	Northern Illinois	
Jordan Waters	RB	NC State	
Trey Wedig	OT	Indiana	
Mario Williams	WR	Tulane	

== Staff ==
2025 Los Angeles Rams staff
Front office: Owner/CEO – Stan Kroenke; President – Kevin Demoff; General manager – Les Snead; Assistant general manager – John McKay; COO – Tony Pastoors; Senior advisor to general manager – Ray Farmer; Senior director of football operations – Sophie Harlan; Senior personnel executive & deputy chief of college scouting staff – Taylor Morton; Senior personnel executives – Marty Barrett, Ted Monago, Chris Driggers; Senior scouting executive – Billy Johnson; Director of pro personnel – Matt Waugh; Director, scouting, strategy & analytics – Nicole Blake; Head coaches: Head coach – Sean McVay; Assistant head coach/pass game coordinator – Aubrey Pleasant; Offensive coaches: Offensive coordinator – Mike LaFleur; Pass game coordinator – Nathan Scheelhaase; Quarterbacks – Dave Ragone; Running backs – Ron Gould; Wide receivers – Eric Yarber; Tight ends – Scott Huff; Offensive line – Ryan Wendell; Assistant offensive line – Zak Kromer; Senior offensive assistant – Alex Van Pelt; Offensive assistant – Rob Calabrese	Defensive coaches: Defensive coordinator – Chris Shula; Defensive line/run game coordinator – Giff Smith; Outside linebackers – Joe Coniglio; Inside linebackers – Greg Williams; Safeties – Chris Beake; Senior defensive assistant – Jimmy Lake; Defensive assistant – Mike Harris; Pass rush coordinator – Drew Wilkins; Special teams coaches: Interim special teams coordinator – Ben Kotwica; Assistant special teams coach - Matt Harper; Game management coordinator/assistant tight ends – Dan Shamash; Strength and conditioning: Director of strength training and performance – Justin Lovett; Assistant strength and conditioning – Dustin Woods

== Final roster ==
2025 Los Angeles Rams roster
Quarterbacks (QB): 13 Stetson Bennett; 11 Jimmy Garoppolo; 9 Matthew Stafford; Running backs (RB): 22 Blake Corum; 27 Jarquez Hunter; 20 Ronnie Rivers; 23 Kyren Williams; Wide receivers (WR): 17 Davante Adams; 5 Tutu Atwell; 15 Konata Mumpfield; 12 Puka Nacua; 19 Xavier Smith; 88 Jordan Whittington; Tight ends (TE): 87 Davis Allen; 18 Terrance Ferguson; 89 Tyler Higbee; 84 Colby Parkinson; 38 Nick Vannett	Offensive linemen (OL): 73 Steve Avila LG; 67 Justin Dedich LG; 69 Kevin Dotson RG; 72 D. J. Humphries LT; 77 Alaric Jackson LT; 50 Beaux Limmer C; 71 Warren McClendon RT; 68 David Quessenberry LT; 65 Coleman Shelton C; Defensive linemen (DL): 90 Tyler Davis DE; 55 Braden Fiske DE; 95 Poona Ford NT; 57 Ty Hamilton NT; 94 Desjuan Johnson DE; 91 Kobie Turner DE	Linebackers (LB): 6 Nick Hampton OLB; 53 Nate Landman ILB; 51 Troy Reeder ILB; 48 Omar Speights ILB; 10 Josaiah Stewart OLB; 8 Jared Verse OLB; 0 Byron Young OLB; Defensive backs (DB): 3 Kamren Curl SS; 14 Cobie Durant CB; 1 Emmanuel Forbes CB; 36 Derion Kendrick CB; 26 Kamren Kinchens FS; 37 Quentin Lake FS; 2 Jaylen McCollough SS; 25 Roger McCreary CB; 30 Josh Wallace CB; 31 Darious Williams CB; Special teams (ST): 42 Ethan Evans P; 92 Harrison Mevis K; 44 Jake McQuaide LS	Practice squad: 61 A. J. Arcuri LT; 82 Tru Edwards WR; 93 Jack Heflin DE; 34 Tanner Ingle SS; 21 Alex Johnson CB; 33 Cam Lampkin CB; 40 Jesse Luketa OLB; 63 Dylan McMahon C; 52 Larrell Murchison DE; 24 Elias Neal ILB; 70 Royce Newman G; 58 Ben Niemann ILB; 97 Bill Norton DE; 81 Brennan Presley WR; 83 Mark Redman TE; 86 Tyler Scott WR; Reserve: -- Wyatt Bowles G (Futures); 56 Shaun Dolac ILB (IR); 79 Rob Havenstein RT (IR/DFR); 96 Keir Thomas OLB (IR); 43 Nate Valcarcel S (Futures); -- Mario Williams WR (Futures); 4 Ahkello Witherspoon CB (IR); Rookies in italics 53 active, 7 reserve, 16 practice squad

== Preseason ==
Week	Date	Opponent	Result	Record	Venue	Recap
1	August 9	Dallas Cowboys	W 31–21	1–0	SoFi Stadium	Recap
2	August 16	Los Angeles Chargers	W 23–22	2–0	SoFi Stadium	Recap
3	August 23	at Cleveland Browns	L 17–19	2–1	Huntington Bank Field	Recap

As had been done for the previous season, assistant head coach/pass game coordinator Aubrey Pleasant served as head coach for the Rams' exhibition matchup against the Chargers, calling plays and making decisions from the sideline while Sean McVay watched the game from the coach's booth.

== Regular season ==
=== Schedule ===
Week	Date	Opponent	Result	Record	Venue	Recap
1	September 7	Houston Texans	**W** 14–9	1–0	SoFi Stadium	Recap
2	September 14	at Tennessee Titans	**W** 33–19	2–0	Nissan Stadium	Recap
3	September 21	at Philadelphia Eagles	**L** 26–33	2–1	Lincoln Financial Field	Recap
4	September 28	Indianapolis Colts	**W** 27–20	3–1	SoFi Stadium	Recap
5	October 2	**San Francisco 49ers**	**L** 23–26 (OT)	3–2	SoFi Stadium	Recap
6	October 12	at Baltimore Ravens	**W** 17–3	4–2	M&T Bank Stadium	Recap
7	October 19	at Jacksonville Jaguars	**W** 35–7	5–2	(United Kingdom) Wembley Stadium (London)	Recap
8	Bye					
9	November 2	New Orleans Saints	**W** 34–10	6–2	SoFi Stadium	Recap
10	November 9	at **San Francisco 49ers**	**W** 42–26	7–2	Levi's Stadium	Recap
11	November 16	**Seattle Seahawks**	**W** 21–19	8–2	SoFi Stadium	Recap
12	November 23	Tampa Bay Buccaneers	**W** 34–7	9–2	SoFi Stadium	Recap
13	November 30	at Carolina Panthers	**L** 28–31	9–3	Bank of America Stadium	Recap
14	December 7	at **Arizona Cardinals**	**W** 45–17	10–3	State Farm Stadium	Recap
15	December 14	Detroit Lions	**W** 41–34	11–3	SoFi Stadium	Recap
16	December 18	at **Seattle Seahawks**	**L** 37–38 (OT)	11–4	Lumen Field	Recap
17	December 29	at Atlanta Falcons	**L** 24–27	11–5	Mercedes-Benz Stadium	Recap
18	January 4	**Arizona Cardinals**	**W** 37–20	12–5	SoFi Stadium	Recap

Note: Intra-division opponents are in bold text.

=== Game summaries ===
==== Week 1: vs. Houston Texans ====
Week 1: Houston Texans at Los Angeles Rams – Game summary

Quarter	1	2	3	4	Total
Texans	3	6	0	0	**9**
**Rams**	0	7	7	0	**14**

at SoFi Stadium, Inglewood, California

- Date: September 7
- Game time: 1:25 p.m. PDT
- Game weather: Sunny, 83 °F (28 °C) (fixed roof)
- Game attendance: 71,346
- Referee: Craig Wrolstad
- TV announcers (CBS): Kevin Harlan, Trent Green and Melanie Collins
- Recap, Game Book

Game information

**First quarter**

- HOU – Ka'imi Fairbairn 51-yard field goal, 1:15. Texans 3–0. **Drive: 13 plays, 62 yards, 7:01.**

**Second quarter**

- HOU – Ka'imi Fairbairn 45-yard field goal, 4:47. Texans 6–0. **Drive: 10 plays, 19 yards, 5:25.**
- LAR – Kyren Williams 1-yard run (Joshua Karty kick), 0:53. Rams 7–6. **Drive: 9 plays, 65 yards, 3:54.**
- HOU – Ka'imi Fairbairn 53-yard field goal, 0:00. Texans 9–7. **Drive: 5 plays, 42 yards, 0:53.**

**Third quarter**

- LAR – Davis Allen 13-yard pass from Matthew Stafford (Joshua Karty kick), 12:28. Rams 14–9. **Drive: 5 plays, 68 yards, 2:32.**

**Fourth quarter**

- No scoring plays

**Top passers**

- HOU – C. J. Stroud – 19/27, 188 yards, INT
- LAR – Matthew Stafford – 21/29, 245 yards, TD

**Top rushers**

- HOU – Nick Chubb – 13 rushes, 60 yards
- LAR – Kyren Williams – 18 rushes, 66 yards, TD

**Top receivers**

- HOU – Jayden Higgins – 2 receptions, 32 yards
- LAR – Puka Nacua – 10 receptions, 130 yards

Wide receiver Puka Nacua caught 10 passes for 130 yards, including a 24-yard reception to convert a critical third down in the final minutes to seal the Rams' season opening game at SoFi Stadium. In a low-scoring defensive battle against the defending AFC South champions, the Rams fell behind 6–0 midway through the second quarter before taking a 7–6 lead, when running back Kyren Williams scored on a 1-yard run that capped a 9-play, 65-yard drive. Though the Texans regained the advantage with a field goal on the final play of the first half, the Rams retook the lead for good on their opening possession of the third quarter, driving 68 yards in five plays before quarterback Matthew Stafford found tight end Davis Allen in the corner of the end zone for a 13-yard touchdown pass. Stafford, who completed 21 of 29 passes for 245 yards with no interceptions, became the 10th quarterback in NFL history to surpass 60,000 career passing yards. Wide receiver Davante Adams had four receptions for 51 yards in his Rams debut. With just over four minutes remaining in the game, the Rams appeared ready to put the game away with a deep drive down to the Houston 12-yard-line where tight end Colby Parkinson was separated from the ball after a short catch. The Texans' final offensive drive covered 57 yards down to the Rams' 25 when Houston quarterback C. J. Stroud found backup running back Dare Ogunbowale for a short gain. As Ogunbowale dived for extra yardage, he was confronted by Rams linebacker Nate Landman, who punched out the ball, which was then recovered by defensive end Braden Fiske, and Los Angeles ultimately ran out the clock. Landman, who shared the team lead in total tackles (10) with safety Kamren Curl, was named NFC Defensive Player of the Week in leading a Rams defense that added three sacks and an interception.

==== Week 2: at Tennessee Titans ====
Week 2: Los Angeles Rams at Tennessee Titans – Game summary

Quarter	1	2	3	4	Total
**Rams**	7	3	10	13	**33**
Titans	0	13	3	3	**19**

at Nissan Stadium, Nashville, Tennessee

- Date: September 14
- Game time: 12:00 p.m. CDT/10:00 a.m. PDT
- Game weather: Cloudy, 83 °F (28 °C)
- Game attendance: 59,069
- Referee: John Hussey
- TV announcers (CBS): Ian Eagle, J. J. Watt and Evan Washburn
- Recap, Game Book

Game information

**First quarter**

- LAR – Puka Nacua 45-yard run (Joshua Karty kick), 8:39. Rams 7–0. **Drive: 6 plays, 72 yards, 3:23.**

**Second quarter**

- TEN – Joey Slye 55-yard field goal, 11:21. Rams 7–3. **Drive: 11 plays, 48 yards, 6:39.**
- LAR – Joshua Karty 21-yard field goal, 7:25. Rams 10–3. **Drive: 10 plays, 72 yards, 3:56.**
- TEN – Elic Ayomanor 9-yard pass from Cam Ward (Joey Slye kick), 0:38. Tied 10–10. **Drive: 10 plays, 56 yards, 2:30.**
- TEN – Joey Slye 37-yard field goal, 0:00. Titans 13–10. **Drive: 3 plays, 27 yards, 0:27.**

**Third quarter**

- LAR – Joshua Karty 21-yard field goal, 9:29. Tied 13–13. **Drive: 11 plays, 62 yards, 5:31.**
- TEN – Joey Slye 57-yard field goal, 3:32. Titans 16–13. **Drive: 11 plays, 35 yards, 5:57.**
- LAR – Davis Allen 8-yard pass from Matthew Stafford (Joshua Karty kick), 1:17. Rams 20–16. **Drive: 4 plays, 69 yards, 2:15.**

**Fourth quarter**

- LAR – Davante Adams 16-yard pass from Matthew Stafford (Joshua Karty kick), 9:40. Rams 27–16. **Drive: 3 plays, 21 yards, 1:29.**
- LAR – Blake Corum 1-yard run (kick blocked), 6:45. Rams 33–16. **Drive: 5 plays, 66 yards, 2:23.**
- TEN – Joey Slye 35-yard field goal, 2:40. Rams 33–19. **Drive: 12 plays, 48 yards, 4:05.**

**Top passers**

- LAR – Matthew Stafford – 23/33, 298 yards, 2 TD, INT
- TEN – Cam Ward – 19/33, 175 yards, TD

**Top rushers**

- LAR – Kyren Williams – 17 rushes, 66 yards
- TEN – Tony Pollard – 20 rushes, 92 yards

**Top receivers**

- LAR – Davante Adams – 6 receptions, 106 yards, TD
- TEN – Calvin Ridley – 3 receptions, 57 yards

Outside linebacker Byron Young had five total tackles with two sacks and a forced fumble as the Rams dominated the host Titans in the second half to move to 2–0 on the season. Los Angeles tallied five sacks (four after halftime) of rookie quarterback Cam Ward and limited Tennessee to just 80 total yards in the final two quarters. Quarterback Matthew Stafford completed 23 of 33 passes for 298 yards with second half touchdown passes to tight end Davis Allen and wide receiver Davante Adams as the Rams scored 20 unanswered points after falling behind 13–10 at halftime. Adams had six receptions for 106 yards while fellow wide receiver Puka Nacua had eight catches for 91 yards while also scoring a 45-yard touchdown run on a jet sweep in the first quarter. Safety Kamren Kinchens had 10 tackles while Nate Landman added eight tackles with a fumble recovery.

==== Week 3: at Philadelphia Eagles ====
Week 3: Los Angeles Rams at Philadelphia Eagles – Game summary

Quarter	1	2	3	4	Total
Rams	10	9	7	0	**26**
**Eagles**	7	0	14	12	**33**

at Lincoln Financial Field, Philadelphia, Pennsylvania

- Date: September 21
- Game time: 1:00 p.m. EDT/10:00 a.m. PDT
- Game weather: Sunny, 73 °F (23 °C)
- Game attendance: 69,879
- Referee: Brad Rogers
- TV announcers (Fox): Joe Davis, Greg Olsen and Pam Oliver
- Recap, Game Book

Game information

**First quarter**

- PHI – Jalen Hurts 1-yard run (Jake Elliott kick), 8:07. Eagles 7–0. **Drive: 9 plays, 38 yards, 5:21.**
- LAR – Joshua Karty 51-yard field goal, 4:00. Eagles 7–3. **Drive: 9 plays, 37 yards, 4:07.**
- LAR – Davante Adams 44-yard pass from Matthew Stafford (Joshua Karty kick), 1:20. Rams 10–7. **Drive: 3 plays, 54 yards, 0:55.**

**Second quarter**

- LAR – Joshua Karty 28-yard field goal, 9:15. Rams 13–7. **Drive: 12 plays, 56 yards, 5:34.**
- LAR – Joshua Karty 33-yard field goal, 3:43. Rams 16–7. **Drive: 8 plays, 39 yards, 4:01.**
- LAR – Joshua Karty 46-yard field goal, 0:10. Rams 19–7. **Drive: 5 plays, 20 yards, 1:42.**

**Third quarter**

- LAR – Kyren Williams 10-yard pass from Matthew Stafford (Joshua Karty kick), 14:06. Rams 26–7. **Drive: 1 play, 10 yards, 0:06.**
- PHI – Dallas Goedert 33-yard pass from Jalen Hurts (Jake Elliott kick), 11:38. Rams 26–14. **Drive: 5 plays, 79 yards, 2:28.**
- PHI – A. J. Brown 9-yard pass from Jalen Hurts (Jake Elliott kick), 2:16. Rams 26–21. **Drive: 13 plays, 87 yards, 6:27.**

**Fourth quarter**

- PHI – Devonta Smith 4-yard pass from Jalen Hurts (pass failed), 1:48. Eagles 27–26. **Drive: 17 plays, 91 yards, 6:54.**
- PHI – Jordan Davis 61-yard blocked field goal return, 0:00. Eagles 33–26.

**Top passers**

- LAR – Matthew Stafford – 19/33, 196 yards, 2 TD, INT
- PHI – Jalen Hurts – 21/32, 226 yards, 3 TD

**Top rushers**

- LAR – Kyren Williams – 20 rushes, 94 yards
- PHI – Saquon Barkley – 18 rushes, 46 yards

**Top receivers**

- LAR – Puka Nacua – 11 receptions, 112 yards
- PHI – A. J. Brown – 6 receptions, 109 yards, TD

Ahead 26–7 less than a minute into the third quarter, the Rams appeared poised to avenge their loss in the NFC Divisional Round from the previous season, but the host Eagles rallied to score 26 unanswered points in the second half to prevail in the battle of unbeaten teams. After giving up an early touchdown to Philadelphia following a Matthew Stafford interception, Los Angeles scored on its next six possessions as kicker Joshua Karty converted four field goals (51, 28, 33, 46) and Stafford threw touchdown passes to wide receiver Davante Adams (44 yards) near the end of the first quarter and running back Kyren Williams (10 yards) just after halftime. The Rams' second touchdown resulted from a strip sack by linebacker Jared Verse with fellow linebacker Nate Landman recovering the fumble. Verse had six total tackles and a sack, one of four by the Rams' defense on the day. However, Philadelphia's offense, which was held to just 33 yards and four first downs in the first half, began to move the ball effectively in the second. Eagles quarterback Jalen Hurts threw for 205 of his 226 total passing yards and three touchdowns in the second half, with his last completion going to wide receiver DeVonta Smith for a 4-yard touchdown with 1:48 remaining in the game. Down 27–26, the Rams rallied as Williams (20 carries, 94 yards) and wide receiver Puka Nacua (11 receptions, 112 yards) picked up significant gains to move Los Angeles into position for a field goal attempt. But Karty, who had a 36-yard field goal attempt blocked earlier in the fourth quarter, had his 44-yard try blocked as time ran out, and the Eagles scored on the return.

==== Week 4: vs. Indianapolis Colts ====
Week 4: Indianapolis Colts at Los Angeles Rams – Game summary

Quarter	1	2	3	4	Total
Colts	3	7	0	10	**20**
**Rams**	3	10	0	14	**27**

at SoFi Stadium, Inglewood, California

- Date: September 28
- Game time: 1:05 p.m. PDT
- Game weather: Cloudy, 74 °F (23 °C) (fixed roof)
- Game attendance: 71,257
- Referee: Carl Cheffers
- TV announcers (Fox): Kevin Kugler, Daryl Johnston and Allison Williams
- Recap, Game Book

Game information

**First quarter**

- LAR – Joshua Karty 42-yard field goal, 7:32. Rams 3–0. **Drive: 11 plays, 57 yards, 5:15.**
- IND – Spencer Shrader 52-yard field goal, 4:55. Tied 3–3. **Drive: 5 plays, 18 yards, 2:37.**

**Second quarter**

- IND – Tyler Warren 2-yard run (Spencer Shrader kick), 12:17. Colts 10–3. **Drive: 9 plays, 45 yards, 5:07.**
- LAR – Joshua Karty 37-yard field goal, 5:21. Colts 10–6. **Drive: 11 plays, 57 yards, 6:56.**
- LAR – Davante Adams 10-yard pass from Matthew Stafford (Joshua Karty kick), 0:07. Rams 13–10. **Drive: 13 plays, 96 yards, 2:07.**

**Third quarter**

- No scoring plays

**Fourth quarter**

- IND – Michael Pittman Jr. 2-yard pass from Daniel Jones (Spencer Shrader kick), 11:34. Colts 17–13. **Drive: 11 plays, 90 yards, 6:07.**
- IND – Spencer Shrader 38-yard field goal, 8:58. Colts 20–13. **Drive: 4 plays, -3 yards, 2:24.**
- LAR – Puka Nacua 9-yard pass from Matthew Stafford (Joshua Karty kick), 3:20. Tied 20–20. **Drive: 11 plays, 83 yards, 5:38.**
- LAR – Tutu Atwell 88-yard pass from Matthew Stafford (Joshua Karty kick), 1:33. Rams 27–20. **Drive: 1 play, 88 yards, 0:11.**

**Top passers**

- IND – Daniel Jones – 24/33, 262 yards, TD, 2 INT
- LAR – Matthew Stafford – 29/41, 375 yards, 3 TD

**Top rushers**

- IND – Jonathan Taylor – 17 rushes, 76 yards
- LAR – Kyren Williams – 13 rushes, 77 yards

**Top receivers**

- IND – Adonai Mitchell – 3 receptions, 96 yards
- LAR – Puka Nacua – 13 receptions, 170 yards, TD

Wide receiver Tutu Atwell's 88-yard touchdown reception with 1:33 remaining broke a 20–20 tie and safety Kamren Curl's second interception preserved the Rams' victory over the previously unbeaten Colts at SoFi Stadium. Atwell's touchdown was the third scoring pass of the day thrown by Los Angeles quarterback Matthew Stafford, who recorded the 50th fourth quarter comeback victory of his career by completing 29 of 41 passes for 375 yards with no interceptions. Curl, who also shared the team lead in total tackles (9) with fellow safety Quentin Lake, got his first interception of Colts quarterback Daniel Jones on the game's fourth play with the turnover leading to the Rams' first lead on a 42-yard Joshua Karty field goal. Karty added a second field goal from 37 yards out and Stafford capped off a 13-play, 96-yard drive with a 10-yard scoring pass to wide receiver Davante Adams with 0:07 remaining before halftime to give the Rams a 13–10 lead at the intermission. Following a scoreless third quarter, Indianapolis surged ahead 20–13 with 10 unanswered points. The Rams tied the score with 3:20 remaining on a 9-yard touchdown pass from Stafford to wide receiver Puka Nacua, who collected 13 receptions for a regular season career-high 170 yards on the day and was named NFC Offensive Player of the Week. The Rams defense, which had two sacks and seven hurries on Jones and limited Colts running back Jonathan Taylor to less than 100 yards in total offense and no scores for the game, forced Indianapolis to punt inside the two-minute warning, setting up Stafford's late heroics.

==== Week 5: vs. San Francisco 49ers ====
Week 5: San Francisco 49ers at Los Angeles Rams – Game summary

Quarter	1	2	3	4	OT	Total
**49ers**	7	10	3	3	3	**26**
Rams	0	7	7	9	0	**23**

at SoFi Stadium, Inglewood, California

- Date: October 2
- Game time: 5:15 p.m. PDT
- Game weather: Cloudy, 71 °F (22 °C) (fixed roof)
- Game attendance: 73,652
- Referee: Bill Vinovich
- TV announcers (Prime Video): Al Michaels, Kirk Herbstreit and Kaylee Hartung
- Recap, Game Book

Game information

**First quarter**

- SF – Jake Tonges 6-yard pass from Mac Jones (Eddy Piñeiro kick), 10:09. 49ers 7–0. **Drive: 8 plays, 72 yards, 4:51.**

**Second quarter**

- SF – Christian McCaffrey 1-yard pass from Mac Jones (Eddy Piñeiro kick), 13:44. 49ers 14–0. **Drive: 17 plays, 91 yards, 8:15.**
- LAR – Kyren Williams 14-yard pass from Matthew Stafford (Joshua Karty kick), 2:09. 49ers 14–7. **Drive: 13 plays, 57 yards, 6:27.**
- SF – Eddy Piñeiro 37-yard field goal, 0:00. 49ers 17–7. **Drive: 12 plays, 48 yards, 2:09.**

**Third quarter**

- SF – Eddy Piñeiro 20-yard field goal, 6:33. 49ers 20–7. **Drive: 12 plays, 55 yards, 6:13.**
- LAR – Puka Nacua 1-yard pass from Matthew Stafford (Joshua Karty kick), 3:45. 49ers 20–14. **Drive: 7 plays, 69 yards, 2:48.**

**Fourth quarter**

- LAR – Kyren Williams 8-yard pass from Matthew Stafford (kick blocked), 10:39. Tied 20–20. **Drive: 9 plays, 88 yards, 3:24.**
- SF – Eddy Piñeiro 59-yard field goal, 2:52. 49ers 23–20. **Drive: 12 plays, 57 yards, 5:12.**
- LAR – Joshua Karty 48-yard field goal, 0:02. Tied 23–23. **Drive: 7 plays, 20 yards, 0:40.**

**Overtime**

- SF – Eddy Piñeiro 41-yard field goal, 5:51. 49ers 26–23. **Drive: 8 plays, 37 yards, 4:09.**

**Top passers**

- SF – Mac Jones – 33/49, 342 yards, 2 TD
- LAR – Matthew Stafford – 30/47, 389 yards, 3 TD

**Top rushers**

- SF – Christian McCaffrey – 22 rushes, 57 yards
- LAR – Kyren Williams – 14 rushes, 65 yards

**Top receivers**

- SF – Kendrick Bourne – 10 receptions, 142 yards
- LAR – Davante Adams – 5 receptions, 88 yards

In a battle for first place in the NFC West, the host Rams were thwarted in overtime as running back Kyren Williams was held for no gain on fourth and 1 at the San Francisco 11 with 3:41 remaining. Despite coming in with an injury-depleted lineup, the 49ers pulled out to a 14–0 lead on two touchdown passes by backup quarterback Mac Jones (342 passing yards). Los Angeles closed the gap on the strength of three touchdown passes from quarterback Matthew Stafford. Williams set career highs for catches (eight), yards (66), and touchdowns (two), and his second scoring catch tied the score 20–20. However, the point-after attempt by Joshua Karty was blocked. After the 49ers took a 23–20 lead, the Rams drove 54 yards in five plays to set up first and goal at the San Francisco 3. Taking the handoff from Stafford, Williams barreled toward the end zone when he was separated from the ball at the 2-yard-line and the 49ers recovered with 1:07 remaining. The Rams defense forced San Francisco to punt and the Rams were able to force overtime after Karty converted a 48-yard field goal with 0:06 remaining in regulation. In the overtime period, San Francisco took possession first and went ahead 26–23 on a 41-yard field goal by kicker Eddy Pineiro. On its possession, Stafford (389 passing yards) connected with wide receivers Puka Nacua (10 receptions, 85 yards, 1 touchdown) and Tutu Atwell (two receptions, 72 yards) to put the Rams in the red zone. Williams caught two passes for short gains to set up the fateful fourth down play. Linebacker Nate Landman led the Rams with 14 tackles, while fellow linebacker Byron Young (named NFC Defensive Player of the Month for September) had six tackles, three quarterback hurries and shared a sack with defensive end Kobie Turner in the loss.

==== Week 6: at Baltimore Ravens ====
Week 6: Los Angeles Rams at Baltimore Ravens – Game summary

Quarter	1	2	3	4	Total
**Rams**	0	3	14	0	**17**
Ravens	3	0	0	0	**3**

at M&T Bank Stadium, Baltimore, Maryland

- Date: October 12
- Game time: 1:00 p.m. EDT/10:00 a.m. PDT
- Game weather: Cloudy, 64 °F (18 °C)
- Game attendance: 70,055
- Referee: Alex Kemp
- TV announcers (Fox): Kevin Burkhardt, Tom Brady, Erin Andrews and Tom Rinaldi
- Recap, Game Book

Game information

**First quarter**

- BAL – Tyler Loop 37-yard field goal, 7:22. Ravens 3–0. **Drive: 12 plays, 53 yards, 7:38.**

**Second quarter**

- LAR – Joshua Karty 36-yard field goal, 9:50. Tied 3–3. **Drive: 12 plays, 48 yards, 4:21.**

**Third quarter**

- LAR – Kyren Williams 3-yard run (Joshua Karty kick), 11:52. Rams 10–3. **Drive: 9 plays, 76 yards, 3:08.**
- LAR – Tyler Higbee 8-yard pass from Matthew Stafford (Joshua Karty kick), 10:20. Rams 17–3. **Drive: 2 plays, 21 yards, 0:40.**

**Fourth quarter**

- No scoring plays

**Top passers**

- LAR – Matthew Stafford – 17/26, 181 yards, TD
- BAL – Cooper Rush – 11/19, 72 yards, INT

**Top rushers**

- LAR – Kyren Williams – 13 rushes, 50 yards, TD
- BAL – Derrick Henry – 24 rushes, 122 yards

**Top receivers**

- LAR – Tyler Higbee – 4 receptions, 40 yards, TD
- BAL – Zay Flowers – 6 receptions, 46 yards

Linebacker Nate Landman set a new team single-game record with 17 tackles (eight solo, nine assists) and led a successful goal line stand late in the first half to spark a bounce back victory over the Ravens on the road at M&T Bank Stadium. After Baltimore reached the Los Angeles 1 on its first and goal play late in the second quarter, Los Angeles stiffened as Landman was in on consecutive stops of Ravens tight end Mark Andrews (who had lined up under center) short of the goal line. On fourth down, outside linebacker Jared Verse fought off Baltimore blockers to stop Ravens running back Derrick Henry for a two-yard loss which preserved a 3–3 tie at halftime. The Rams began the third quarter with an efficient nine-play, 76-yard drive in just over three minutes. Quarterback Matthew Stafford completed six of eight pass attempts for 73 yards, including a critical 30-yard connection with running back Kyren Williams on a fourth-and-2 play from the Baltimore 33. One play later, Williams (13 carries, 50 yards) went up the middle for a 3-yard touchdown run. Stafford completed 17 of 26 passes for 181 yards and one touchdown, an 8-yard score to tight end Tyler Higbee, who led the Rams with four receptions for 40 yards. Wide receiver Davante Adams added four receptions for 39 yards while fellow wideout Puka Nacua was limited to just two receptions for 28 yards, both of which came on a second quarter drive in which he was injured after landing hard in the end zone following an incomplete pass. Though the drive ended in a 36-yard field goal by kicker Joshua Karty, Nacua did not play the rest of the quarter and came in for only a handful of plays after halftime and was not targeted. Safety Quentin Lake had six tackles and an interception, and his fumble recovery in the third quarter helped to set up the Stafford-to-Higbee touchdown. The Rams defense recorded seven tackles for loss and 11 hurries of Ravens quarterbacks Cooper Rush and Tyler Huntley, with the latter getting sacked four times in the fourth quarter including twice by outside linebacker Byron Young. Following the game, the Rams stayed in Baltimore and conducted closed practices at Oriole Park at Camden Yards in preparation for their Week 7 game in London.

==== Week 7: at Jacksonville Jaguars ====
NFL London games

Week 7: Los Angeles Rams at Jacksonville Jaguars – Game summary

Quarter	1	2	3	4	Total
**Rams**	14	7	0	14	**35**
Jaguars	0	0	0	7	**7**

at Wembley Stadium, London, United Kingdom

- Date: October 19
- Game time: 2:30 p.m. BST/6:30 a.m. PDT
- Game weather: Rain, 59 °F (15 °C)
- Game attendance: 86,152
- Referee: Adrian Hill
- TV announcers (NFLN): Rich Eisen, Kurt Warner and Sara Walsh
- Recap, Game Book

Game information

**First quarter**

- LAR – Konata Mumpfield 5-yard pass from Matthew Stafford (Joshua Karty kick), 6:38. Rams 7–0. **Drive: 13 plays, 60 yards, 6:55.**
- LAR – Davante Adams 2-yard pass from Matthew Stafford (Joshua Karty kick), 1:51. Rams 14–0. **Drive: 6 plays, 79 yards, 3:09.**

**Second quarter**

- LAR – Davante Adams 1-yard pass from Matthew Stafford (Joshua Karty kick), 4:37. Rams 21–0. **Drive: 5 plays, 60 yards, 2:21.**

**Third quarter**

- No scoring plays.

**Fourth quarter**

- LAR – Terrance Ferguson 31-yard pass from Matthew Stafford (Joshua Karty kick), 11:11. Rams 28–0. **Drive: 8 plays, 62 yards, 4:16.**
- JAX – Travis Hunter 34-yard pass from Trevor Lawrence (Cam Little kick), 9:06. Rams 28–7. **Drive: 5 plays, 80 yards, 2:05.**
- LAR – Davante Adams 1-yard pass from Matthew Stafford (Joshua Karty kick), 4:58. Rams 35–7. **Drive: 8 plays, 45 yards, 4:08.**

**Top passers**

- LAR – Matthew Stafford – 21/33, 182 yards, 5 TD
- JAX – Trevor Lawrence – 23/48, 296 yards, TD

**Top rushers**

- LAR – Kyren Williams – 12 rushes, 54 yards
- JAX – Travis Etienne – 8 rushes, 44 yards

**Top receivers**

- LAR – Colby Parkinson – 3 receptions, 47 yards
- JAX – Travis Hunter – 8 receptions, 101 yards, TD

Quarterback Matthew Stafford matched personal and team single-game team records by throwing five touchdown passes as the Rams routed the host Jaguars at Wembley Stadium. Despite leading receiver Puka Nacua being sidelined with an ankle sprain, Los Angeles scored on three of its first four possessions. Stafford (21-for-33, 182 yards) completed passes to 11 different receivers on the day and connected with rookie wideout Konata Mumpfield on a 5-yard score and then veteran wide receiver Davante Adams (five receptions, 35 yards) from two yards out to give the Rams a 14–0 lead in the first quarter. Adams caught 1-yard touchdown passes from Stafford in both the second and fourth quarters, matching his single-game career high for touchdown passes with three (accomplished twice while Adams was with the Green Bay Packers). Stafford also threw a 31-yard scoring pass to rookie tight end Terrance Ferguson, and his five touchdown passes were the most ever by any quarterback in an NFL International Series game. It was the fifth five-touchdown game of Stafford's career and his first as a Ram. Defensively, Los Angeles dominated the game with seven sacks and five other tackles for loss. Safety Kamren Curl had a team-high 10 tackles, while inside linebacker Nate Landman had nine tackles, while both he and outside linebacker Byron Young had 1.5 sacks each in the victory, which improved the Rams' record to 5–2 heading into their bye week and gave the Rams a perfect 5–0 record against AFC opponents for the season.

==== Week 9: vs. New Orleans Saints ====
Week 9: New Orleans Saints at Los Angeles Rams – Game summary

Quarter	1	2	3	4	Total
Saints	0	10	0	0	**10**
**Rams**	7	13	7	7	**34**

at SoFi Stadium, Inglewood, California

- Date: November 2
- Game time: 1:05 p.m. PST
- Game weather: Sunny, 65 °F (18 °C) (fixed roof)
- Game attendance: 72,055
- Referee: Shawn Smith
- TV announcers (Fox): Kenny Albert, Jonathan Vilma and Megan Olivi
- Recap, Game Book

Game information

**First quarter**

- LAR – Tyler Higbee 1-yard pass from Matthew Stafford (Joshua Karty kick), 6:18. Rams 7–0. **Drive: 12 plays, 88 yards, 6:43.**

**Second quarter**

- LAR – Davante Adams 3-yard pass from Matthew Stafford (kick failed), 11:28. Rams 13–0. **Drive: 11 plays, 62 yards, 5:53.**
- NO – Blake Grupe 39-yard field goal, 7:50. Rams 13–3. **Drive: 8 plays, 44 yards, 3:38.**
- LAR – Puka Nacua 39-yard pass from Matthew Stafford (Joshua Karty kick), 6:25. Rams 20–3. **Drive: 3 plays, 65 yards, 1:25.**
- NO – Juwan Johnson 11-yard pass from Tyler Shough (Blake Grupe kick), 0:07. Rams 20–10. **Drive: 6 plays, 71 yards, 0:47.**

**Third quarter**

- LAR – Davante Adams 4-yard pass from Matthew Stafford (Joshua Karty kick), 5:14. Rams 27–10. **Drive: 16 plays, 80 yards, 9:46.**

**Fourth quarter**

- LAR – Kyren Williams 1-yard run (Joshua Karty kick), 12:40. Rams 34–10. **Drive: 10 plays, 52 yards, 6:22.**

**Top passers**

- NO – Tyler Shough – 15/24, 176 yards, TD, INT
- LAR – Matthew Stafford – 24/32, 281 yards, 4 TD

**Top rushers**

- NO – Taysom Hill – 4 rushes, 30 yards
- LAR – Kyren Williams – 25 rushes, 114 yards, TD

**Top receivers**

- NO – Rashid Shaheed – 5 receptions, 68 yards
- LAR – Puka Nacua – 7 receptions, 95 yards, TD

Matthew Stafford continued his impressive play as the Rams secured their first conference victory of the season to improve to 6–2. The veteran quarterback completed 24 of 32 passes for 281 yards and threw four touchdown passes to add to his league-leading total (21). Los Angeles scored on three of its first four possessions, with tight end Tyler Higbee's 1-yard touchdown reception capping a 12-play, 88-yard drive to start the game. After punting on their next drive, the Rams drove 62 yards in 11 plays with Stafford throwing a 3-yard touchdown pass to wide receiver Davante Adams. After New Orleans got on the scoreboard with a field goal, the Rams responded quickly as Stafford found wide receiver Puka Nacua for a 39-yard touchdown pass. Nacua, who had not played since the Rams' Week 6 victory over Baltimore, led the Rams with seven receptions for 95 yards. The Rams opened up the second half with an impressive 16-play drive that covered 80 yards and consumed 9 minutes and 46 seconds as Adams (five receptions, 60 yards) and Stafford connected for another score, this time from four yards out. Running back Kyren Williams had his best game of the season with 114 yards on 25 carries including a 1-yard touchdown run early in the fourth quarter to finish the Rams' scoring, and backup Blake Corum added 58 yards on 13 carries. Defensively, Nate Landman had five tackles and forced a fumble that was recovered by safety Kamren Kinchens to set up the Rams' final touchdown. Cornerback Emmanuel Forbes added four total tackles and three pass deflections along with an interception in Los Angeles's victory.

==== Week 10: at San Francisco 49ers ====
Week 10: Los Angeles Rams at San Francisco 49ers – Game summary

Quarter	1	2	3	4	Total
**Rams**	14	7	7	14	**42**
49ers	0	7	7	12	**26**

at Levi's Stadium, Santa Clara, California

- Date: November 9
- Game time: 1:25 p.m. PST
- Game weather: Sunny, 77 °F (25 °C)
- Game attendance: 71,239
- Referee: Land Clark
- TV announcers (Fox): Kevin Burkhardt, Tom Brady, Erin Andrews and Tom Rinaldi
- Recap, Game Book

Game information

**First quarter**

- LAR – Kyren Williams 2-yard run (Harrison Mevis kick), 10:14. Rams 7–0. **Drive: 10 plays, 64 yards, 4:46.**
- LAR – Puka Nacua 22-yard pass from Matthew Stafford (Harrison Mevis kick), 5:34. Rams 14–0. **Drive: 7 plays, 86 yards, 3:20.**

**Second quarter**

- LAR – Davis Allen 4-yard pass from Matthew Stafford (Harrison Mevis kick), 13:41. Rams 21–0. **Drive: 9 plays, 59 yards, 4:33.**
- SF – Jauan Jennings 6-yard pass from Mac Jones (Eddy Pineiro kick), 3:15. Rams 21–7. **Drive: 7 plays, 36 yards, 3:29.**

**Third quarter**

- SF – Brian Robinson Jr. 1-yard run (Eddy Pineiro kick), 9:33. Rams 21–14. **Drive: 10 plays, 65 yards, 5:27.**
- LAR – Davante Adams 2-yard pass from Matthew Stafford (Harrison Mevis kick), 2:39. Rams 28–14. **Drive:12 plays, 64 yards, 6:54.**

**Fourth quarter**

- SF – Luke Farrell 9-yard pass from Mac Jones (kick blocked), 12:29. Rams 28–20. **Drive: 10 plays, 70 yards, 5:10.**
- LAR – Kyren Williams 7-yard run (Harrison Mevis kick), 10:04. Rams 35–20. **Drive: 5 plays, 64 yards, 2:25.**
- LAR – Colby Parkinson 16-yard pass from Matthew Stafford (Harrison Mevis kick), 5:10. Rams 42–20. **Drive: 6 plays, 38 yards, 3:19.**
- SF – George Kittle 13-yard pass from Mac Jones (pass failed), 2:59. Rams 42–26. **Drive: 7 plays, 65 yards, 2:11.**

**Top passers**

- LAR – Matthew Stafford – 24/36, 280 yards, 4 TD
- SF – Mac Jones – 33/39, 319 yards, 3 TD, INT

**Top rushers**

- LAR – Kyren Williams – 14 rushes, 73 yards, 2 TD
- SF – Brian Robinson Jr. – 8 rushes, 41 yards, TD

**Top receivers**

- LAR – Davante Adams – 6 receptions, 77 yards, TD
- SF – George Kittle – 9 receptions, 84 yards, TD

The Rams raced to a 21-point first half lead and never trailed as they dealt the host 49ers their first NFC West loss of the season while avenging their overtime loss to San Francisco five weeks earlier. Quarterback Matthew Stafford surpassed 400 career touchdown passes (402) with scoring throws to four different receivers while becoming the first quarterback in NFL history to have four touchdown passes with no interceptions in three consecutive games. Receiving the opening kickoff, the Rams marched 64 yards in 10 plays and finished the drive with a 2-yard touchdown run by running back Kyren Williams. After the defense forced the 49ers to punt, Los Angeles scored again on wide receiver Puka Nacua's 22-yard touchdown reception to complete a 7-play drive that covered 86 yards. On San Francisco's second offensive possession, Nate Landman punched out the ball from the hands of 49ers wideout Jauan Jennings, which was then recovered by safety Kamren Kinchens, who returned the fumble 13 yards to the Rams' 41-yard line. Nine plays later, Stafford found tight end Davis Allen from four yards out to put Los Angeles up 21–0. After San Francisco closed the gap 21–14 early in the third period, Los Angeles responded with a 2-yard touchdown pass from Stafford to wide receiver Davante Adams (six receptions, 77 yards), as both continued to lead the NFL in touchdown passes (Stafford, 25) and touchdown receptions (Adams, 9). In the fourth quarter, Williams (14 carries, 73 yards) scored a second touchdown run and following an interception by Los Angeles cornerback Emmanuel Forbes, Stafford added a final touchdown pass with a 16-yard score to tight end Colby Parkinson. On defense, Landman, Omar Speights, and safety Quentin Lake all led the team with 11 tackles each as the Los Angeles recorded its first division victory of the season. As the Rams improved to 7–2, head coach Sean McVay also became the franchise's all-time leader in games coached (154).

==== Week 11: vs. Seattle Seahawks ====
Week 11: Seattle Seahawks at Los Angeles Rams – Game summary

Quarter	1	2	3	4	Total
Seahawks	3	6	3	7	**19**
**Rams**	14	0	0	7	**21**

at SoFi Stadium, Inglewood, California

- Date: November 16
- Game time: 1:05 p.m. PST
- Game weather: Cloudy, 64 °F (18 °C) (fixed roof)
- Game attendance: 75,323
- Referee: John Hussey
- TV announcers (Fox): Joe Davis, Greg Olsen and Pam Oliver
- Recap, Game Book

Game information

**First quarter**

- LAR – Kyren Williams 1-yard run (Harrison Mevis kick), 8:38. Rams 7–0. **Drive: 4 plays, 3 yards, 2:10.**
- SEA – Jason Myers 57-yard field goal, 6:31. Rams 7–3. **Drive: 6 plays, 26 yards, 2:07.**
- LAR – Davante Adams 1-yard pass from Matthew Stafford (Harrison Mevis kick), 1:05. Rams 14–3. **Drive: 10 plays, 74 yards, 5:27.**

**Second quarter**

- SEA – Jason Myers 30-yard field goal, 9:04. Rams 14–6. **Drive: 13 plays, 53 yards, 7:00.**
- SEA – Jason Myers 22-yard field goal, 0:00. Rams 14–9. **Drive: 15 plays, 89 yards, 7:47.**

**Third quarter**

- SEA – Jason Myers 29-yard field goal, 8:02. Rams 14–12. **Drive: 10 plays, 55 yards, 5:54.**

**Fourth quarter**

- LAR – Colby Parkinson 6-yard pass from Matthew Stafford (Harrison Mevis kick), 14:15. Rams 21–12. **Drive: 4 plays, 25 yards, 1:49.**
- SEA – Kenneth Walker III 1-yard run (Jason Myers kick), 2:23. Rams 21–19. **Drive: 11 plays, 84 yards, 3:37.**

**Top passers**

- SEA – Sam Darnold – 29/44, 279 yards, 4 INT
- LAR – Matthew Stafford – 15/28, 130 yards, 2 TD

**Top rushers**

- SEA – Kenneth Walker III – 16 rushes, 67 yards, TD
- LAR – Kyren Williams – 12 rushes, 91 yards, TD

**Top receivers**

- SEA – Jaxon Smith-Njigba – 9 receptions, 105 yards
- LAR – Puka Nacua – 7 receptions, 75 yards

Safety Kamren Kinchens had two of his team's four interceptions as the Rams held on to victory against visiting Seattle in a battle for the NFC West Division lead. After being thwarted on a fourth and inches play at the Seahawks 8 at the end of its game-opening drive, Los Angeles came back as Kinchens intercepted Seattle quarterback Sam Darnold and returned the ball 31 yards to the Seahawks 3-yard line. Four plays later, Rams running back Kyren Williams scored on a 1-yard run. Following a Seahawks field goal, the Rams drove down the field again with Williams' 34-yard run setting up a 1-yard touchdown pass from quarterback Matthew Stafford to wide receiver Davante Adams for the 1,000th reception of Adams' NFL career and a 14–3 first quarter lead. However, Adams failed to catch another pass in the game as the Seattle defense limited Stafford to a season-low 130 yards passing. But the Seahawks were kept out of the end zone until late in the game as Kinchens picked off Darnold for the second time late in the third quarter, which led to Stafford's 6-yard touchdown pass to tight end Colby Parkinson and a 21–12 Rams lead. Offensively, Williams had 91 yards on 12 carries, while wide receiver Puka Nacua led Los Angeles with seven receptions for 75 yards but in the third quarter lost a fumble for the first time in his NFL career, which led to a Seattle field goal. Former Ram Cooper Kupp, now starting at wide receiver for the Seahawks, was held without a catch until late in the fourth quarter when he caught three passes for 23 yards which set up a Seattle touchdown that closed the lead to 21–19. After the Rams offense failed to run out the clock on its last possession, the Seahawks drove 52 yards to the Los Angeles 47 with one second remaining. From there, kicker Jason Myers, who had converted four field goals, missed a 61-yard attempt that went wide right as time expired. Cornerbacks Cobie Durant and Darious Williams also collected interceptions to stop Seattle drives, while safety Kamren Curl led the Rams with 11 tackles. Punter Ethan Evans delivered six punts for 253 yards (42.2 average), including a 50-yarder that bounced out of bounds at the 1-yard line to pin Seattle on its final drive, and was named NFC Special Teams Player of the Week. The Rams' victory ended the Seahawks' 10-game road winning streak.

==== Week 12: vs. Tampa Bay Buccaneers ====
Week 12: Tampa Bay Buccaneers at Los Angeles Rams – Game summary

Quarter	1	2	3	4	Total
Buccaneers	0	7	0	0	**7**
**Rams**	14	17	0	3	**34**

at SoFi Stadium, Inglewood, California

- Date: November 23
- Game time: 5:20 p.m. PST
- Game weather: Clear, 63 °F (17 °C) (fixed roof)
- Game attendance: 75,545
- Referee: Clay Martin
- TV announcers (NBC): Mike Tirico, Cris Collinsworth and Melissa Stark
- Recap, Game Book

Game information

**First quarter**

- LAR – Davante Adams 1-yard pass from Matthew Stafford (Harrison Mevis kick), 4:32. Rams 7–0. **Drive: 10 plays, 80 yards, 5:38.**
- LAR – Cobie Durant 50-yard interception return (Harrison Mevis kick), 1:42. Rams 14–0.

**Second quarter**

- LAR – Colby Parkinson 5-yard pass from Matthew Stafford (Harrison Mevis kick), 10:46. Rams 21–0. **Drive: 12 plays, 72 yards, 5:02.**
- TB – Tez Johnson 14-yard pass from Baker Mayfield (Chase McLaughlin kick), 5:03. Rams 21–7. **Drive: 10 plays, 65 yards, 5:43.**
- LAR – Davante Adams 24-yard pass from Matthew Stafford (Harrison Mevis kick), 3:10. Rams 28–7. **Drive: 4 plays, 65 yards, 1:53.**
- LAR – Harrison Mevis 40-yard field goal, 1:02. Rams 31–7. **Drive: 4 plays, 7 yards, 0:37.**

**Third quarter**

- No scoring plays

**Fourth quarter**

- LAR – Harrison Mevis 52-yard field goal, 13:35. Rams 34–7. **Drive: 8 plays, 30 yards, 3:39.**

**Top passers**

- TB – Teddy Bridgewater – 8/15, 62 yards
- LAR – Matthew Stafford – 25/35, 273 yards, 3 TD

**Top rushers**

- TB – Sean Tucker – 12 rushes, 42 yards
- LAR – Kyren Williams – 12 rushes, 46 yards

**Top receivers**

- TB – Emeka Egbuka – 3 receptions, 32 yards
- LAR – Puka Nacua – 7 receptions, 97 yards

On Sunday Night Football where color commentator Cris Collinsworth celebrated his 500th broadcast, the Rams dominated the NFC South-leading Buccaneers for their sixth straight victory and taking over the top seed in the NFC. Quarterback Matthew Stafford capped off an opening drive that covered 80 yards in 10 plays with a 1-yard touchdown pass to wide receiver Davante Adams. On Tampa Bay's first possession, Bucs tight end Cade Otton juggled a pass from quarterback Baker Mayfield when he collided with Rams cornerback Cobie Durant, who wrestled the ball away and returned the interception 50 yards for a score. After forcing a punt, the Rams drove down the field in the second quarter with Stafford finding tight end Colby Parkinson for a 5-yard TD pass. Stafford, who completed 25 of 35 passes for 273 yards, threw his third (and NFL-best 30th) touchdown pass on a 24-yard connection to Adams, who increased his league-leading TD receptions total to 12. Fellow Rams wide receiver Puka Nacua led his team with seven receptions for 97 yards, while kicker Harrison Mevis converted four PATs and was perfect on field goals of 40 and 52 yards in the second and fourth quarters. Defensive end Kobie Turner and outside linebacker Jared Verse had two sacks each of Mayfield, who was knocked out of the game late in the second quarter with a shoulder injury.

==== Week 13: at Carolina Panthers ====
Week 13: Los Angeles Rams at Carolina Panthers – Game summary

Quarter	1	2	3	4	Total
Rams	7	14	0	7	**28**
**Panthers**	14	3	7	7	**31**

at Bank of America Stadium, Charlotte, North Carolina

- Date: November 30
- Game time: 1:00 p.m. EST/10:00 a.m. PST
- Game weather: Cloudy, 45 °F (7 °C)
- Game attendance: 71,292
- Referee: Scott Novak (with Adrian Hill's crew)
- TV announcers (Fox): Adam Amin, Drew Brees and Kristina Pink
- Recap, Game Book

Game information

**First quarter**

- LAR – Davante Adams 4-yard pass from Matthew Stafford (Harrison Mevis kick), 12:10. Rams 7–0. **Drive: 6 plays, 35 yards, 2:50.**
- CAR – Chuba Hubbard 35-yard pass from Bryce Young (Ryan Fitzgerald kick), 7:38. Tied 7–7. **Drive: 9 plays, 69 yards, 4:32.**
- CAR – Mike Jackson 48-yard interception return (Ryan Fitzgerald kick), 1:10. Panthers 14–7.

**Second quarter**

- LAR – Davante Adams 7-yard pass from Matthew Stafford (Harrison Mevis kick), 12:46. Tied 14–14. **Drive: 7 plays, 64 yards, 3:24.**
- CAR – Ryan Fitzgerald 33-yard field goal, 5:33. Panthers 17–14. **Drive: 12 plays, 60 yards, 7:13.**
- LAR – Blake Corum 2-yard run (Harrison Mevis kick), 1:55. Rams 21–17. **Drive: 7 plays, 80 yards, 3:38.**

**Third quarter**

- CAR – Jalen Coker 33-yard pass from Bryce Young (Ryan Fitzgerald kick), 8:48. Panthers 24–21. **Drive: 10 plays, 71 yards, 6:12.**

**Fourth quarter**

- LAR – Kyren Williams 7-yard run (Harrison Mevis kick), 9:58. Rams 28–24. **Drive: 6 plays, 89 yards, 3:36.**
- CAR – Tetairoa McMillan 43-yard pass from Bryce Young (Ryan Fitzgerald kick), 6:34. Panthers 31–28. **Drive: 6 plays, 65 yards, 3:24.**

**Top passers**

- LAR – Matthew Stafford – 18/28, 243 yards, 2 TD, 2 INT
- CAR – Bryce Young – 15/20, 206 yards, 3 TD

**Top rushers**

- LAR – Blake Corum – 7 rushes, 81 yards, TD
- CAR – Chuba Hubbard – 17 rushes, 83 yards

**Top receivers**

- LAR – Xavier Smith – 3 receptions, 82 yards
- CAR – Jalen Coker – 4 receptions, 74 yards, TD

Riding a six-game win streak and entering the game as 10-point favorites, the Rams struggled throughout the matchup and were ultimately upset by the host Panthers. Los Angeles struck quickly on the game's opening drive with wide receiver Davante Adams catching a 4-yard touchdown pass from quarterback Matthew Stafford, who set a new NFL record with 28 consecutive TD passes without an interception. After the Panthers answered with a touchdown of their own, the Rams drove 60 yards in six plays down to the Carolina 8. But on the next play, Stafford threw a pass toward the end zone that was tipped and then intercepted by Panthers safety Nick Scott (a former Ram). Stafford, who had only thrown two interceptions in the previous 11 games, later threw a second interception, which Panthers cornerback Mike Jackson returned 48 yards for a touchdown that gave Carolina a 14–7 first quarter lead. Los Angeles would score on its next two possessions to take a 21–17 halftime edge, with Stafford and Adams connecting again on a 7-yard score (Adams' league-leading 14th TD reception) and running back Blake Corum (seven carries, 81 yards) scoring from two yards out. Fellow Rams running back Kyren Williams (13 carries, 72 yards) added a 7-yard TD run in the fourth quarter to put L.A. up 28–24 as the Rams rushing attack averaged 7.2 yards per attempt. But Carolina quarterback Bryce Young twice threw for touchdowns on fourth-down plays to help the Panthers take a 31–28 lead midway through the final quarter. The Rams then covered 55 yards in nine plays to drive inside the Carolina 20 with just over two minutes remaining and appeared ready to take the lead or at least tie. But a delay of game penalty (Los Angeles's only infraction of the game) stalled the Rams' momentum. Then, in the decisive moment of the fourth quarter, Panthers defensive end Derrick Brown, who had tipped the pass that led to Stafford’s first interception, recorded a critical strip-sack of the Rams QB with 2:25 remaining, helping secure Carolina's victory. Linebackers Nate Landman and Byron Young shared the Rams' team lead in tackles with eight each, while Young and Braden Fiske both had sacks in the loss.

==== Week 14: at Arizona Cardinals ====
Week 14: Los Angeles Rams at Arizona Cardinals – Game summary

Quarter	1	2	3	4	Total
**Rams**	10	14	14	7	**45**
Cardinals	7	3	0	7	**17**

at State Farm Stadium, Glendale, Arizona

- Date: December 7
- Game time: 2:25 p.m. MST/1:25 p.m. PST
- Game weather: Sunny, 68 °F (20 °C) (retractable roof open)
- Game attendance: 61,970
- Referee: Ron Torbert
- TV announcers (Fox): Kenny Albert, Jonathan Vilma and Megan Olivi
- Recap, Game Book

Game information

**First quarter**

- ARI – Michael Wilson 19-yard pass from Jacoby Brissett (Chad Ryland kick), 12:05. Cardinals 7–0. **Drive: 5 plays, 67 yards, 2:55.**
- LAR – Harrison Mevis 26-yard field goal, 7:40. Cardinals 7–3. **Drive: 10 plays, 60 yards, 4:25.**
- LAR – Blake Corum 2-yard run (Harrison Mevis kick), 1:29. Rams 10–7. **Drive: 6 plays, 74 yards, 3:26.**

**Second quarter**

- ARI – Chad Ryland 38-yard field goal, 8:34. Tied 10–10. **Drive: 13 plays, 62 yards, 7:55.**
- LAR – Kyren Williams 2-yard run (Harrison Mevis kick), 2:47. Rams 17–10. **Drive: 10 plays, 65 yards, 5:47.**
- LAR – Puka Nacua 28-yard pass from Matthew Stafford (Harrison Mevis kick), 0:12. Rams 24–10. **Drive: 7 plays, 92 yards, 1:30.**

**Third quarter**

- LAR – Colby Parkinson 6-yard pass from Matthew Stafford (Harrison Mevis kick), 10:09. Rams 31–10. **Drive: 10 plays, 74 yards, 4:51.**
- LAR – Puka Nacua 31-yard pass from Matthew Stafford (Harrison Mevis kick), 0:12. Rams 38–10. **Drive: 1 play, 31 yards, 0:06.**

**Fourth quarter**

- LAR – Blake Corum 48-yard run (Harrison Mevis kick), 13:46. Rams 45–10. **Drive: 1 play, 48 yards, 0:10.**
- ARI – Michael Wilson 14-yard pass from Jacoby Brissett (Chad Ryland kick), 11:08. Rams 45–17. **Drive: 10 plays, 65 yards, 2:38.**

**Top passers**

- LAR – Matthew Stafford – 22/31, 281 yards, 3 TD
- ARI – Jacoby Brissett – 25/44, 271 yards, 2 TD, INT

**Top rushers**

- LAR – Blake Corum – 12 rushes, 128 yards, 2 TD
- ARI – Jacoby Brissett – 4 rushes, 22 yards

**Top receivers**

- LAR – Puka Nacua – 7 receptions, 167 yards, 2 TD
- ARI – Michael Wilson – 11 receptions, 142 yards, 2 TD

The Rams bounced back with their most productive offensive performance of the season, rolling up 530 yards in dominating the Cardinals to improve to 10–3. The blowout victory not only guaranteed the seventh 10-win campaign in nine seasons under head coach Sean McVay, it was the team's third straight season with at least 10 wins, the first time that had been accomplished by the franchise since 1999 to 2001 during The Greatest Show On Turf era. Quarterback Matthew Stafford, who had been named NFC Offensive Player of the Month for November, threw for 281 yards and added three more touchdown passes to his league-leading total of 35. His main target for the day was wide receiver Puka Nacua, who caught seven receptions for 167 yards with touchdown catches of 28 and 31 yards for the first multi-TD game of his career. The Rams run game had its best outing of the season with 253 yards on the ground. Running back Blake Corum ran for a season and career best 128 yards on 12 carries with two touchdowns, including a 48-yard scoring run in the fourth quarter. Kyren Williams added 84 yards on 13 carries with one TD, while backup Ronnie Rivers played most of the fourth quarter and had nine carries for 41 yards. Defensively, safety Kamren Curl led the team with six tackles including a sack, while outside linebacker Byron Young and defensive end Kobie Turner had a sack each. Nate Landman added an interception along with a pair of pass deflections in the rout, as the Rams beat the Cardinals in Arizona for the 10th time in the last 11 seasons dating back to 2015.

==== Week 15: vs. Detroit Lions ====
Week 15: Detroit Lions at Los Angeles Rams – Game summary

Quarter	1	2	3	4	Total
Lions	7	17	0	10	**34**
**Rams**	7	10	17	7	**41**

at SoFi Stadium, Inglewood, California

- Date: December 14
- Game time: 1:25 p.m. PST
- Game weather: Sunny, 65 °F (18 °C) (fixed roof)
- Game attendance: 74,701
- Referee: Alan Eck
- TV announcers (Fox): Kevin Burkhardt, Tom Brady, Erin Andrews and Tom Rinaldi
- Recap, Game Book

Game information

**First quarter**

- DET – Amon-Ra St. Brown 17-yard pass from Jared Goff (Jake Bates Kick), 8:07. Lions 7–0. **Drive: 1 play, 17 yards, 0:05**
- LAR – Kyren Williams 4-yard run (Harrison Mevis Kick), 2:44. Tied 7–7. **Drive: 13 plays, 72 yards, 5:23**

**Second quarter**

- DET – Jake Bates 24-yard field goal, 12:04. Lions 10–7. **Drive: 12 plays, 59 yards, 5:40**
- LAR – Kyren Williams 1-yard run (Harrison Mevis Kick), 8:31. Rams 14–10. **Drive: 6 plays, 69 yards, 3:33**
- DET – Amon-Ra St. Brown 8-yard pass from Jared Goff (Jake Bates Kick), 6:12. Lions 17–14. **Drive: 4 plays, 65 yards, 2:19**
- DET – Jameson Williams 31-yard pass from Jared Goff (Jake Bates Kick), 0:30. Lions 24–14. **Drive: 9 plays, 80 yards, 2:39**
- LAR – Harrison Mevis 37-yard field goal, 0:00. Lions 24–17. **Drive: 5 plays, 47 yards, 0:30**

**Third quarter**

- LAR – Harrison Mevis 44-yard field goal, 9:07. Lions 24–20. **Drive: 11 plays, 41 yards, 5:53**
- LAR – Colby Parkinson 26-yard pass from Matthew Stafford (Harrison Mevis Kick), 2:26. Rams 27–24. **Drive: 9 plays, 88 yards, 4:13**
- LAR – Blake Corum 11-yard run (Harrison Mevis Kick), 0:28. Rams 34–24. **Drive: 2 plays, 50 yards, 0:52**

**Fourth quarter**

- DET – Jake Bates 48-yard field goal, 7:54. Rams 34–27. **Drive: 9 plays, 36 yards, 4:32**
- LAR – Colby Parkinson 11-yard pass from Matthew Stafford (Harrison Mevis Kick), 4:49. Rams 41–27. **Drive: 6 plays, 68 yards, 3:05**
- DET – David Montgomery 1-yard run (Jake Bates Kick), 2:42. Rams 41–34. **Drive: 12 plays, 65 yards, 2:07**

**Top passers**

- DET – Jared Goff – 25/41, 338 yards, 3 TD
- LAR – Matthew Stafford – 24/38, 368 yards, 2 TD, INT

**Top rushers**

- DET – Jahmyr Gibbs – 13 rushes, 38 yards
- LAR – Kyren Williams – 15 rushes, 78 yards, 2 TD

**Top receivers**

- DET – Jameson Williams – 13 receptions, 164 yards, 2 TD
- LAR – Puka Nacua – 9 receptions, 181 yards

Down 24–14 late in the second quarter, the Rams dominated in the second half both offensively and defensively to improve to 11–3 on the season. With its first win over Detroit since 2021, Los Angeles clinched its third straight playoff berth and seventh since 2017 under head coach Sean McVay. Rams running back Kyren Williams (15 carries, 78 yards) scored his second touchdown of the game to give the Rams its first lead 14–10 midway through the second period. But the Lions roared back with two touchdown passes from former Rams quarterback Jared Goff to take a 10-point advantage. Harrison Mevis started Los Angeles's rally by converting a 37-yard field goal at the end of the first half, then followed it up with a 44-yard field goal on the Rams' first drive of the third quarter. Tight end Colby Parkinson (five receptions, 75 yards) caught touchdown passes of 26 and 11 yards and running back Blake Corum (11 carries, 71 yards) scored on an 11-yard run. Quarterback Matthew Stafford shrugged off an early interception against his former team and threw for 368 yards while wide receiver Puka Nacua caught nine passes for a regular season career-high 181 yards (coincidentally matching his NFL-record performance in a 2023 NFC Wild Card Game for most receiving yards by a rookie in a playoff game). Nate Landman led the team with 10 total tackles, leading a defense that held Detroit's formidable rushing tandem of Jahmyr Gibbs and David Montgomery to less than 100 yards in combined total offense. With the win, the Rams became the first NFC team to clinch a playoff berth.

==== Week 16: at Seattle Seahawks ====
Week 16: Los Angeles Rams at Seattle Seahawks – Game summary

Quarter	1	2	3	4	OT	Total
Rams	3	10	10	7	7	**37**
**Seahawks**	7	0	7	16	8	**38**

at Lumen Field, Seattle, Washington

- Date: December 18
- Game time: 5:15 p.m. PST
- Game weather: Rain, 51 °F (11 °C)
- Game attendance: 68,853
- Referee: Brad Allen
- TV announcers (KTTV/Prime Video): Al Michaels, Kirk Herbstreit and Kaylee Hartung
- Recap, Game Book

Game information

**First quarter**

- SEA – Zach Charbonnet 4-yard run (Jason Myers kick), 7:09. Seahawks 7–0. **Drive: 5 plays, 61 yards, 2:41.**
- LAR – Harrison Mevis 23-yard field goal, 1:43. Seahawks 7–3. **Drive: 12 plays, 71 yards, 5:26.**

**Second quarter**

- LAR – Harrison Mevis 28-yard field goal, 12:45. Seahawks 7–6. **Drive: 8 plays, 78 yards, 3:13.**
- LAR – Terrance Ferguson 3-yard pass from Matthew Stafford (Harrison Mevis kick), 3:43. Rams 13–7. **Drive: 11 plays, 62 yards, 6:41.**

**Third quarter**

- SEA – Kenneth Walker III 55-yard run (Jason Myers kick), 12:57. Seahawks 14–13. **Drive: 4 plays, 65 yards, 2:03.**
- LAR – Harrison Mevis 41-yard field goal, 8:37. Rams 16–14. **Drive: 7 plays, 51 yards, 4:20.**
- LAR – Blake Corum 1-yard run (Harrison Mevis kick), 6:30. Rams 23–14. **Drive: 1 play, 1 yard, 0:04.**

**Fourth quarter**

- LAR – Puka Nacua 1-yard pass from Matthew Stafford (Harrison Mevis kick), 13:34. Rams 30–14. **Drive: 9 plays, 85 yards, 4:58.**
- SEA – Rashid Shaheed 58-yard punt return (Sam Darnold–Cooper Kupp pass), 8:03. Rams 30–22.
- SEA – AJ Barner 26-yard pass from Sam Darnold (Zach Charbonnet run), 6:23. Tied 30–30. **Drive: 2 plays, 57 yards, 0:39.**

**Overtime**

- LAR – Puka Nacua 41-yard pass from Matthew Stafford (Harrison Mevis kick), 6:27. Rams 37–30. **Drive: 8 plays, 80 yards, 3:33.**
- SEA – Jaxon Smith-Njigba 4-yard pass from Sam Darnold (Sam Darnold–Eric Saubert pass), 3:13. Seahawks 38–37. **Drive: 9 plays, 65 yards, 3:14.**

**Top passers**

- LAR – Matthew Stafford – 29/49, 457 yards, 3 TD
- SEA – Sam Darnold – 22/34, 270 yards, 2 TD, 2 INT

**Top rushers**

- LAR – Kyren Williams – 23 rushes, 70 yards
- SEA – Kenneth Walker III – 11 rushes, 100 yards, TD

**Top receivers**

- LAR – Puka Nacua – 12 receptions, 225 yards, 2 TD
- SEA – Jaxon Smith-Njigba – 8 receptions, 96 yards, TD

Despite producing 37 points and nearly 600 yards in total offense with no turnovers, the Rams let a 16–point fourth quarter lead evaporate before falling in overtime to the host Seahawks on Thursday Night Football at Lumen Field. Quarterback Matthew Stafford completed 29 of 49 passes for 457 yards (the third-highest single-game total of his career and best-ever as a Ram) with three touchdown passes. Wide receiver Puka Nacua continued his torrid pace with 12 receptions for 225 yards (breaking his career single-game high set only four days earlier) and two touchdowns. Trailing 14–13 early in the third period, Los Angeles began to pull away as Harrison Mevis converted his third field goal of the game and Blake Corum scored on a 1-yard run just one play after cornerback Josh Wallace returned an interception from Seahawks quarterback Sam Darnold 56 yards before being tackled just short of the goal line. Following a Seattle punt, the Rams drove 85 yards in nine plays, capped off by Stafford and Nacua connecting from one yard out on a no-look pass. After defensive end Kobie Turner recorded his first career interception off a Darnold pass at the Rams 1-yard line on Seattle's next possession, the Rams led 30–14 in the fourth quarter with 9:39 remaining. However, the Rams were forced to punt and a 58-yard return by the Seahawks' Rashid Shaheed resulted in a Seattle touchdown that (along with a successful two-point conversion pass from Darnold to former Rams wide receiver Cooper Kupp) closed the margin to 30–22. After another Rams punt, a 31-yard run by Shaheed set up a 26-yard touchdown pass from Darnold to tight end AJ Barner, bringing the Seahawks within two points. Seattle then attempted a two-point conversion as Darnold threw to his left towards the sideline. Although the pass bounced off the helmet of an onrushing Jared Verse and fell into the end zone, initially appearing incomplete, a replay review determined that Darnold had attempted a backward pass. The loose ball was casually picked up by Seahawks running back Zach Charbonnet (the original intended receiver on the play) and he was then credited with the conversion, tying the game at 30–30. After failing to pick up a first down on three consecutive possessions, the Rams drove 51 yards in seven plays to the Seattle 29, but Mevis missed a field goal attempt for the first time in his NFL career with the kick going wide right. Both teams had one more possession in the fourth quarter, but neither could get into scoring position. The game proceeded to overtime, where the Rams received the opening kickoff and covered 80 yards in nine plays, with Stafford finding Nacua across the middle for a 41-yard touchdown and a 37–30 advantage. The Seahawks responded with a nine-play drive of their own with Darnold connecting with Jaxon Smith-Njigba for a 4-yard TD pass with 3:13 remaining. Opting again for the two-point attempt, Darnold completed a pass to tight end Eric Saubert over the middle, securing the conversion and giving Seattle the critical NFC West victory in a thrilling finish. The Rams became the first team to lose an overtime game after scoring a touchdown on the opening possession, following a change to overtime rules that guarantees the opposing team a possession even if a TD is scored on the initial drive. Linebacker Omar Speights led L.A. with seven total tackles while Turner had 1.5 sacks and two pass deflections to add to his interception. Two days after the loss, Rams special teams coordinator Chase Blackburn was fired, with the team's special teams unit attributed with three of the team's four losses through Week 16. The Rams once again failed to sweep the Seahawks, not having done so since 2023.

==== Week 17: at Atlanta Falcons ====
Week 17: Los Angeles Rams at Atlanta Falcons – Game summary

Quarter	1	2	3	4	Total
Rams	0	0	10	14	**24**
**Falcons**	7	14	3	3	**27**

at Mercedes-Benz Stadium, Atlanta, Georgia

- Date: December 29
- Game time: 8:15 p.m. EST/5:15 p.m. PST
- Game weather: None (retractable roof closed)
- Game attendance: 69,313
- Referee: Clete Blakeman
- TV announcers (ESPN): Joe Buck, Troy Aikman, Lisa Salters and Laura Rutledge
- Recap, Game Book

Game information

**First quarter**

- ATL – Bijan Robinson 4-yard pass from Kirk Cousins (Zane Gonzalez kick), 6:11. Falcons 7–0. **Drive: 11 plays, 65 yards, 5:35.**

**Second quarter**

- ATL – Jessie Bates III 34-yard interception return (Zane Gonzalez kick), 8:30. Falcons 14–0.
- ATL – Bijan Robinson 93-yard run (Zane Gonzalez kick), 1:28. Falcons 21–0. **Drive: 1 play, 93 yards, 0:13.**

**Third quarter**

- LAR – Harrison Mevis 35-yard field goal, 11:08. Falcons 21–3. **Drive: 8 plays, 38 yards, 3:52.**
- ATL – Zane Gonzalez 56-yard field goal, 7:46. Falcons 24–3. **Drive: 5 plays, 31 yards, 3:22.**
- LAR – Terrance Ferguson 27-yard pass from Matthew Stafford (Harrison Mevis kick), 4:59. Falcons 24–10. **Drive: 6 plays, 65 yards, 2:47.**
- LAR – Jared Verse 76-yard blocked field goal return (Harrison Mevis kick), 0:31. Falcons 24–17.

**Fourth quarter**

- LAR – Puka Nacua 11-yard pass from Matthew Stafford (Harrison Mevis kick), 2:46. Tied 24–24. **Drive: 8 plays, 89 yards, 4:42.**
- ATL – Zane Gonzalez 51-yard field goal, 0:21. Falcons 27–24. **Drive: 9 plays, 32 yards, 2:25.**

**Top passers**

- LAR – Matthew Stafford – 22/38, 269 yards, 2 TD, 3 INT
- ATL – Kirk Cousins – 13/20, 126 yards, TD

**Top rushers**

- LAR – Kyren Williams – 13 rushes, 92 yards
- ATL – Bijan Robinson – 22 rushes, 195 yards, TD

**Top receivers**

- LAR – Xavier Smith – 4 receptions, 67 yards
- ATL – David Sills V – 3 receptions, 37 yards

Returning to action 11 days after losing the NFC West lead to Seattle, the Rams fell behind 21–0 at halftime against the host Falcons on the final Monday Night Football game of the season. Although they outscored Atlanta 24–3 in the second half going late into the fourth quarter, the Falcons were able to kick a field goal to seal the win, and Los Angeles lost its second straight game to fall to 11–5 with a 2–2 record against NFC South teams and a 5–4 record on the road for the season. Quarterback Matthew Stafford had a rough night with three interceptions, including two in the second quarter. The first came midway through the period when Falcons safety Jessie Bates III picked off Stafford's pass (intended for Konata Mumpfield) and returned it 34 yards for a touchdown. With under two minutes, Stafford's deep pass for Xavier Smith was intercepted by Atlanta rookie safety Xavier Watts at the Falcons 7-yard line. On the following play, running back Bijan Robinson scored on a 93-yard touchdown run, giving the Falcons a three-touchdown lead and marking only the third time a Sean McVay-coached team had been shut out in the first half. The run was also the longest of the NFL season. Stafford, who completed 22 of 38 passes for 269 yards, got the Rams offense going in the third quarter with a 35-yard field goal from kicker Harrison Mevis and a 27-yard TD pass from Stafford to rookie tight end Terrance Ferguson. Atlanta responded with a 55-yard drive to the Rams 19, but a field goal attempt by Falcons kicker Zane Gonzalez was blocked by Jared Verse, who fielded the loose ball on one bounce and raced 76 yards for a touchdown, the first blocked field goal TD return by the Rams since Week 2 of the 1986 season. In the fourth quarter, wide receiver Puka Nacua caught an 11-yard TD pass from Stafford with 2:46 remaining to finished off an 8-play, 89-yard drive to tie the score at 24–24. But Gonzalez (who had a 56-yard field goal in the third quarter) converted on a 51-yard attempt with 21 seconds remaining to give the Falcons the victory. Smith caught four passes for 67 yards, while Nacua had five receptions for 47 yards and running back Kyren Williams rushed for 92 yards on 13 carries. Safety Kamren Curl's nine tackles led the defense in the loss. The night before this matchup, the Rams were eliminated from contention for the NFC West Division title after the Seahawks and 49ers defeated the Carolina Panthers and Chicago Bears, respectively. The game also represented the last time the team wore its "bone" jersey and pants, a combination that was first introduced during the 2020 season.

==== Week 18: vs. Arizona Cardinals ====
Week 18: Arizona Cardinals at Los Angeles Rams – Game summary

Quarter	1	2	3	4	Total
Cardinals	3	3	14	0	**20**
**Rams**	3	13	7	14	**37**

at SoFi Stadium, Inglewood, California

- Date: January 4
- Game time: 1:25 p.m. PST
- Game weather: Cloudy, 61 °F (16 °C) (fixed roof)
- Game attendance: 72,004
- Referee: Carl Cheffers
- TV announcers (Fox): Kenny Albert, Jonathan Vilma and Megan Olivi
- Recap, Game Book

Game information

**First quarter**

- LAR – Harrison Mevis 34-yard field goal, 11:07. Rams 3–0. **Drive: 4 plays, 7 yards, 1:53.**
- ARI – Chad Ryland 45-yard field goal, 3:26. Tied 3–3. **Drive: 13 plays, 56 yards, 7:41.**

**Second quarter**

- LAR – Harrison Mevis 42-yard field goal, 11:45. Rams 6–3. **Drive: 13 plays, 49 yards, 6:41.**
- ARI – Chad Ryland 56-yard field goal, 9:35. Tied 6–6. **Drive: 6 plays, 27 yards, 2:10.**
- LAR – Puka Nacua 2-yard pass from Matthew Stafford (Harrison Mevis kick), 1:22. Rams 13–6. **Drive: 18 plays, 74 yards, 8:13.**
- LAR – Harrison Mevis 40-yard field goal, 0:00. Rams 16–6. **Drive: 7 plays, 47 yards, 0:49.**

**Third quarter**

- ARI – Michael Wilson 43-yard pass from Jacoby Brissett (Chad Ryland kick), 10:38. Rams 16–13. **Drive: 5 plays, 73 yards, 3:03.**
- ARI – Josiah Deguara 7-yard pass from Jacoby Brissett (Chad Ryland kick), 3:51. Cardinals 20–16. **Drive: 10 plays, 76 yards, 6:17.**
- LAR – Colby Parkinson 21-yard pass from Matthew Stafford (Harrison Mevis kick), 0:42. Rams 23–20. **Drive: 6 plays, 70 yards, 3:09.**

**Fourth quarter**

- LAR – Tyler Higbee 22-yard pass from Matthew Stafford (Harrison Mevis kick), 10:39. Rams 30–20. **Drive: 6 plays, 66 yards, 2:53.**
- LAR – Colby Parkinson 1-yard pass from Matthew Stafford (Harrison Mevis kick), 4:15. Rams 37–20. **Drive: 12 plays, 81 yards, 4:57.**

**Top passers**

- ARI – Jacoby Brissett – 22/31, 243 yards, 2 TD, INT
- LAR – Matthew Stafford – 25/40, 259 yards, 4 TD

**Top rushers**

- ARI – Emari Demercado – 2 rushes, 29 yards
- LAR – Kyren Williams – 12 rushes, 60 yards

**Top receivers**

- ARI – Michael Wilson – 5 receptions, 99 yards, TD
- LAR – Tyler Higbee – 5 receptions, 91 yards, TD

Coach Sean McVay earned his 100th career victory as a head coach (combined regular season and postseason) as the Rams pulled out to a 16–6 halftime lead, then fell behind 20–16 before scoring 21 unanswered points to win the regular season finale. Los Angeles staked out a 10-point advantage with three field goals (34, 42, 40) from Harrison Mevis and a 2-yard touchdown pass from quarterback Matthew Stafford to wide receiver Puka Nacua, who made a diving one-handed catch on a fade pattern in the end zone to finish off an 18-play, 74-yard scoring drive. But the Rams offense stalled in the third quarter with three consecutive three-and-out possessions to start the second half. Arizona capitalized with two TD passes from Cardinals quarterback Jacoby Brissett to take a 4-point lead. Stafford, who completed 25 of 40 passes for 259 yards, guided the Rams on three straight scoring drives covering 70, 66, and 81 yards and all ending with Stafford TD passes. Tight end Colby Parkinson put the Rams ahead for good with a 21-yard score and had a 1-yard catch for L.A.'s last TD, while fellow tight end Tyler Higbee (making his first start since Week 12) caught a 22-yard touchdown reception. Higbee had five receptions for 91 yards in his return from injured reserve, while Nacua had a team-high 10 receptions for 76 yards. Stafford finished the season with 4,707 yards and a franchise-record 46 touchdown passes which led the NFL in both categories. Running backs Kyren Williams (12 carries, 60 yards) and Blake Corum (13 carries, 59 yards) led the Rams on the ground, while Nacua added two jet sweep runs for 24 yards. Defensively, strong safety Jaylen McCollough had a team-high seven tackles while backup defensive end Desjuan Johnson had two of the Ram six sacks of Brissett. Outside linebacker Josaiah Stewart had one sack as well as a forced fumble which was recovered by defensive end Kobie Turner which led to the Rams' first field goal. Cornerback Ahkello Witherspoon also added an interception that led to an Los Angeles field goal at the end of the second quarter. The victory, coupled with the 49ers' loss to the Seahawks the previous day, clinched for the Rams the NFC's No. 5 seed for the playoffs, and their 12–5 regular record (4–2 against the NFC West and 7–1 at home) was the team's best since the 2021 season, which ended with a victory in Super Bowl LVI. With the win, the Rams locked in the fifth seed and were scheduled to face the Carolina Panthers in the Wild Card Round.

=== Standings ===
==== Division ====
NFC West
	W	L	T	PCT	DIV	CONF	PF	PA	STK
^{(1)} Seattle Seahawks	14	3	0	.824	4–2	9–3	483	292	W7
^{(5)} Los Angeles Rams	12	5	0	.706	4–2	7–5	518	346	W1
^{(6)} San Francisco 49ers	12	5	0	.706	4–2	9–3	437	371	L1
Arizona Cardinals	3	14	0	.176	0–6	3–9	355	488	L9

==== Conference ====
NFC
Seed	Team	Division	W	L	T	PCT	DIV	CONF	SOS	SOV	STK
**Division leaders**
1	Seattle Seahawks	West	14	3	0	.824	4–2	9–3	.498	.471	W7
2 (Note: Chicago finished ahead of Philadelphia based on head-to-head victory.)	Chicago Bears	North	11	6	0	.647	2–4	7–5	.458	.406	L2
3	Philadelphia Eagles	East	11	6	0	.647	3–3	8–4	.476	.455	L1
4 (Note: Carolina finished ahead of Tampa Bay and Atlanta based on head-to-head record (Carolina 3–1 to Tampa Bay 2–2 and Atlanta 1–3).)	Carolina Panthers	South	8	9	0	.471	3–3	6–6	.522	.463	L2
**Wild cards**
5 (Note: LA Rams finished ahead of San Francisco based on common games (LA Rams 9–3 to San Francisco 8–4 against: Arizona, Atlanta, Carolina, Houston, Indianapolis, Jacksonville, New Orleans, Seattle, Tampa Bay and Tennessee).)	Los Angeles Rams	West	12	5	0	.706	4–2	7–5	.526	.485	W1
6	San Francisco 49ers	West	12	5	0	.706	4–2	9–3	.498	.417	L1
7	Green Bay Packers	North	9	7	1	.559	4–2	7–4–1	.483	.431	L4
**Did not qualify for the postseason**
8 (Note: Minnesota finished ahead of Detroit based on head-to-head sweep.)	Minnesota Vikings	North	9	8	0	.529	4–2	7–5	.514	.431	W5
9	Detroit Lions	North	9	8	0	.529	2–4	6–6	.490	.428	W1
10 (Note: Tampa Bay finished ahead of Atlanta based on common games (Tampa Bay 6–6 to Atlanta 5–7 against: Arizona, Buffalo, Carolina, LA Rams, Miami, New England, New Orleans, NY Jets, San Francisco and Seattle).)	Tampa Bay Buccaneers	South	8	9	0	.471	3–3	6–6	.529	.485	W1
11	Atlanta Falcons	South	8	9	0	.471	3–3	7–5	.495	.449	W4
12	Dallas Cowboys	East	7	9	1	.441	4–2	4–7–1	.438	.311	L1
13	New Orleans Saints	South	6	11	0	.353	3–3	4–8	.495	.333	L1
14	Washington Commanders	East	5	12	0	.294	3–3	3–9	.507	.388	W1
15	New York Giants	East	4	13	0	.235	2–4	2–10	.524	.478	W2
16	Arizona Cardinals	West	3	14	0	.176	0–6	3–9	.571	.422	L9
**Tiebreakers** (Note: When breaking ties for three or more teams under the NFL's rules, they are first broken within divisions, then comparing only the highest ranked remaining team from each division.)

== Postseason ==
=== Schedule ===
Round	Date	Opponent (seed)	Result	Record	Venue	Sources
Wild Card	January 10	at Carolina Panthers (4)	W 34–31	1–0	Bank of America Stadium	Recap
Divisional	January 18	at Chicago Bears (2)	W 20–17 (OT)	2–0	Soldier Field	Recap
NFC Championship	January 25	at Seattle Seahawks (1)	L 27–31	2–1	Lumen Field	Recap

=== Game summaries ===
==== NFC Wild Card Playoffs: at (4) Carolina Panthers ====
NFC Wild Card Playoffs: (5) Los Angeles Rams at (4) Carolina Panthers – Game summary

Quarter	1	2	3	4	Total
Rams	7	10	3	14	34
Panthers	0	14	3	14	31

at Bank of America Stadium, Charlotte, North Carolina

- Date: January 10, 2026
- Game time: 4:35 p.m. EST/1:35 p.m. PST
- Game weather: Mostly cloudy, 72 °F (22 °C)
- Game attendance: 73,426
- Referee: Clete Blakeman
- TV announcers (Fox): Joe Davis, Greg Olsen, Pam Oliver, and Kristina Pink
- Recap, Game Book

Game information

First quarter

- LAR – Puka Nacua 14-yard pass from Matthew Stafford (Harrison Mevis kick), 11:35. Rams 7–0. Drive: 4 plays, 45 yards, 1:51.

Second quarter

- LAR – Puka Nacua 5-yard run (Harrison Mevis kick), 12:16. Rams 14–0. Drive: 7 plays, 48 yards, 4:01.
- CAR – Chuba Hubbard 1-yard run (Ryan Fitzgerald kick), 8:53. Rams 14–7. Drive: 7 plays, 65 yards, 3:23.
- LAR – Harrison Mevis 46-yard field goal, 5:24. Rams 17–7. Drive: 6 plays, 37 yards, 3:29.
- CAR – Bryce Young 16-yard run (Ryan Fitzgerald kick), 0:37. Rams 17–14. Drive: 5 plays, 81 yards, 0:54.

Third quarter

- CAR – Ryan Fitzgerald 46-yard field goal, 7:29. Tied 17–17. Drive: 13 plays, 59 yards, 7:08.
- LAR – Harrison Mevis 42-yard field goal, 4:17. Rams 20–17. Drive: 9 plays, 46 yards, 3:12.

Fourth quarter

- CAR – Chuba Hubbard 3-yard run (Ryan Fitzgerald kick), 14:34. Panthers 24–20. Drive: 4 plays, 62 yards, 1:40.
- LAR – Kyren Williams 13-yard pass from Matthew Stafford (Harrison Mevis kick), 8:47. Rams 27–24. Drive: 11 plays, 67 yards, 5:47.
- CAR – Jalen Coker 7-yard pass from Bryce Young (Ryan Fitzgerald kick), 2:39. Panthers 31–27. Drive: 4 plays, 30 yards, 1:33.
- LAR – Colby Parkinson 19-yard pass from Matthew Stafford (Harrison Mevis kick), 0:38. Rams 34–31. Drive: 7 plays, 71 yards, 2:01.

Top passers

- LAR – Matthew Stafford – 24/42, 304 yards, 3 TD, INT
- CAR – Bryce Young – 21/39, 264 yards, TD, INT

Top rushers

- LAR – Kyren Williams – 13 rushes, 57 yards
- CAR – Chuba Hubbard – 13 rushes, 46 yards, 2 TD

Top receivers

- LAR – Puka Nacua – 10 receptions, 111 yards, TD
- CAR – Jalen Coker – 9 receptions, 134 yards, TD

Tight end Colby Parkinson's 19-yard touchdown reception with 38 seconds remaining lifted the Rams over the host Panthers at Bank of America Stadium. The dramatic score ended a wild fourth quarter that saw four lead changes in the teams' first playoff matchup since an NFC Divisional Round contest in 2003 that was decided in double overtime. After the defense got a fourth down stop near midfield on Carolina's opening drive, the Rams capitalized quickly by driving 45 yards in four plays. Quarterback Matthew Stafford connected with wide receiver Puka Nacua on three passes for 40 yards, the last going for a 14-yard TD over the middle for a 7–0 lead. After the teams traded punts, L.A. set up its second score when cornerback Cobie Durant intercepted Panthers quarterback Bryce Young that (along with an unnecessary roughness penalty on Carolina) gave the Rams possession near midfield towards the end of the first quarter. Seven plays later, Nacua took a backward pass from Stafford and cut his way inside for a 5-yard touchdown run and a 14–0 lead early in the second period. After the Panthers answered with a Chuba Hubbard touchdown run, the Rams responded with a 46-yard field goal by kicker Harrison Mevis. Late in the second quarter, L.A. missed an opportunity to extend its lead after a muffed punt return by Carolina. With under two minutes left, the Rams drove to the Panthers' 19-yard line but failed to convert on a fourth-and-3 play, and Carolina drove for another touchdown on a 16-yard run by Young with 37 seconds remaining to close the score to within 17–14. After Carolina tied the score midway through the third period, Los Angeles moved ahead with a second field goal from Mevis, this from 42 yards out. Hubbard's 3-yard TD run early in the fourth quarter put the Panthers ahead for the first time 24–20. A critical play occurred on the Rams' ensuing offensive drive when on a third-and-1 play from the Carolina 30, Stafford overthrew Nacua in the end zone. But as Panthers safety Nick Scott tried to bring the pass down, Nacua broke up the play to preserve the Rams' possession. Six plays later, Stafford threw a 13-yard touchdown pass to running back Kyren Williams for a 27–24 lead. The teams traded punts again, but this time disaster struck as Rams punter Ethan Evans's kick was blocked and recovered by the Panthers at the L.A. 30. Carolina pounced just four plays later with a 7-yard TD pass from Young to wide receiver Jalen Coker to pull ahead 31–27 with 2:39 remaining. Starting from their own 19, the Rams moved the ball quickly down the field as Stafford (24-of-42, 304 yards) completed six of seven passes for 71 yards with the last 19 going to Parkinson for the go-ahead score. L.A.'s defense, led by outside linebacker Jared Verse (who had two of his team's eight quarterback pressures), forced Young to throw four straight incomplete passes to secure the victory. Safety Kamren Curl and linebacker Nate Landman both had 10 tackles to lead the Rams while safety Quentin Lake (returning for his first game after two months on injured reserve) had six tackles and two pass deflections, one of which led to an interception by Durant, who added two pass deflections of his own. Offensively, Nacua caught 10 passes for 111 yards and a touchdown while also running the ball three times for 14 yards and another score. Fellow wide receiver Davante Adams returned to the starting lineup after missing the final three weeks of the regular season and caught five passes for 72 yards. Williams had 13 carries for 57 yards rushing along with two catches for 18 yards and a touchdown. With the win, the Rams advanced to the Divisional Round for the second straight year and improved to 1–1 against the Panthers in the playoffs.

==== NFC Divisional Playoffs: at (2) Chicago Bears ====
NFC Divisional Playoffs: (5) Los Angeles Rams at (2) Chicago Bears – Game summary

Quarter	1	2	3	4	OT	Total
Rams	7	3	0	7	3	20
Bears	0	10	0	7	0	17

at Soldier Field, Chicago, Illinois

- Date: January 18, 2026
- Game time: 5:40 p.m. CST/3:40 p.m. PST
- Game weather: Snow, 19 °F (−7 °C)
- Game attendance: 60,253
- Referee: Shawn Hochuli
- TV announcers (NBC): Mike Tirico, Cris Collinsworth, Melissa Stark and Kaylee Hartung
- Recap, Game Book

Game information

First quarter

- LAR – Kyren Williams 4-yard run (Harrison Mevis kick), 6:20. Rams 7–0. Drive: 14 plays, 85 yards, 6:33.

Second quarter

- CHI – D. J. Moore 3-yard pass from Caleb Williams (Cairo Santos kick), 14:55. Tied 7–7. Drive: 12 plays, 80 yards, 6:25.
- CHI – Cairo Santos 48-yard field goal, 1:10. Bears 10–7. Drive: 5 plays, 33 yards, 1:44.
- LAR – Harrison Mevis 32-yard field goal, 0:00. Tied 10–10. Drive: 8 plays, 66 yards, 1:10.

Third quarter

- No scoring plays

Fourth quarter

- LAR – Kyren Williams 5-yard run (Harrison Mevis kick), 8:50. Rams 17–10. Drive: 14 plays, 91 yards, 6:02.
- CHI – Cole Kmet 14-yard pass from Caleb Williams (Cairo Santos kick), 0:18. Tied 17–17. Drive: 7 plays, 50 yards, 1:32.

Overtime

- LAR – Harrison Mevis 42-yard field goal, 3:19. Rams 20–17. Drive: 10 plays, 54 yards, 3:20.

Top passers

- LAR – Matthew Stafford – 20/42, 258 yards
- CHI – Caleb Williams – 23/42, 257 yards, 2 TD, 3 INT

Top rushers

- LAR – Kyren Williams – 21 rushes, 87 yards, 2 TD
- CHI – D'Andre Swift – 19 rushes, 76 yards

Top receivers

- LAR – Colby Parkinson – 3 receptions, 56 yards
- CHI – Colston Loveland – 4 receptions, 56 yards

A 42-yard field goal by kicker Harrison Mevis with 3:24 left in overtime lifted the Rams over the host Bears in an NFC Divisional Round playoff game at Chicago's Soldier Field. The victory advanced Los Angeles to its third NFC Championship Game in eight seasons under head coach Sean McVay in the first meeting between the Rams and Bears in the playoffs since the 1985 season. Safety Kamren Curl got his team's third interception of Chicago quarterback Caleb Williams to ignite the game-winning drive in a frigid defensive struggle and led the Rams with 13 tackles, while inside linebacker Nate Landman had 10. Cornerback Cobie Durant ended Chicago's game-opening drive with an interception of Williams in front of the goal line and returned it to the L.A. 15. The Rams then marched 85 yards in 14 plays to take the early lead on a 4-yard TD run by running back Kyren Williams. Chicago responded with a 12-play, 80-yard drive that ended with a 3-yard touchdown pass from Williams to wide receiver D. J. Moore to tie the score at 7–7 at the start of the second quarter. After the teams traded punts on the next five possessions, the Bears took their first (and only) lead of the game on a 48-yard field goal by kicker Cairo Santos (a former Ram) with 1:10 remaining. The Rams came back just before halftime, moving 66 yards in eight plays to set up a 32-yard field by Mevis that tied the score again 10–10 at the intermission. Following a scoreless third quarter, the Rams regained the lead by grinding out a 91-yard drive over 14 plays, with Williams scoring his second TD of the game on a 5-yard run midway through the fourth period. Chicago was poised to tie the score again by driving to the L.A. 2-yard line with under four minutes remaining. But safety Quentin Lake made a key stop by upending Bears running back D'Andre Swift for no gain on third down and forcing an incomplete pass on fourth. However, the Rams were unable to run out the clock and Chicago had one final chance in regulation with under two minutes left, and Williams' desperation pass on fourth-and-4 from the L.A. 14 was caught by tight end Cole Kmet with 18 seconds left to force overtime. The Rams received the kickoff but had to punt after being unable to pick up a first down. The Bears appeared poised to win, moving from their own 16 to the Rams 48, but Williams attempted to find Moore again on a deep route pass that was intercepted by a diving Curl. Starting from its own 22, L.A. moved on the arm of quarterback Matthew Stafford (20-of-42, 258 yards), who completed first down passes to tight end Colby Parkinson (three receptions, 56 yards) for 15 yards, and to wide receivers Davante Adams (two receptions, 24 yards) for 12 and Puka Nacua (five receptions, 56 yards) for 16 yards that led the way to the game-winning kick by Mevis. Williams ran for 87 yards and two TDs on 21 carries and had four catches for 30 yards to lead the offense, while Durant had two interceptions and three pass deflections on defense for the Rams. The victory improved McVay's career postseason record to 10–5, and the Bears were the 15th different team McVay has faced in 15 total playoff games up to that point. With their first playoff win against the Bears in franchise history, the Rams secured their first Divisional Round win since 2021 and their first win in Chicago since 2003.

==== NFC Championship: at (1) Seattle Seahawks ====
NFC Championship: (5) Los Angeles Rams at (1) Seattle Seahawks – Game summary

Quarter	1	2	3	4	Total
Rams	3	10	14	0	27
Seahawks	10	7	14	0	31

at Lumen Field, Seattle, Washington

- Date: January 25, 2026
- Game time: 3:40 p.m. PST
- Game weather: Sunny, 41 °F (5 °C)
- Game attendance: 68,773
- Referee: Clay Martin
- TV announcers (Fox): Kevin Burkhardt, Tom Brady, Erin Andrews, and Tom Rinaldi
- Recap, Game Book

Game information

First quarter

- SEA – Kenneth Walker III 2-yard run (Jason Myers kick), 9:50. Seahawks 7–0. Drive: 7 plays, 81 yards, 3:36.
- LAR – Harrison Mevis 44-yard field goal, 8:50. Seahawks 7–3. Drive: 6 plays, 47 yards, 1:42.
- SEA – Jason Myers 27-yard field goal, 0:54. Seahawks 10–3. Drive: 12 plays, 56 yards, 7:21.

Second quarter

- LAR – Harrison Mevis 50-yard field goal, 12:21. Seahawks 10–6. Drive: 8 plays, 33 yards, 3:43.
- LAR – Kyren Williams 9–yard pass from Matthew Stafford (Harris Mevis kick), 1:55. Rams 13–10. Drive: 12 plays, 87 yards, 7:23.
- SEA – Jaxon Smith-Njigba 14-yard pass from Sam Darnold (Jason Myers kick), 0:20. Seahawks 17–13. Drive: 5 plays, 74 yards, 0:34.

Third quarter

- SEA – Jake Bobo 17-yard pass from Sam Darnold (Jason Myers kick), 12:02. Seahawks 24–13. Drive: 1 play, 17 yards, 0:05.
- LAR – Davante Adams 2-yard pass from Matthew Stafford (Harrison Mevis kick), 9:41. Seahawks 24–20. Drive: 4 plays, 75 yards, 2:21.
- SEA – Cooper Kupp 13-yard pass from Sam Darnold (Jason Myers kick), 4:52. Seahawks 31–20. Drive: 9 plays, 65 yards, 4:49.
- LAR – Puka Nacua 34-yard pass from Matthew Stafford (Harrison Mevis kick), 2:06. Seahawks 31–27. Drive: 5 plays, 87 yards, 2:46.

Fourth quarter

- No scoring plays

Top passers

- LAR – Matthew Stafford – 22/35, 374 yards, 3 TD
- SEA – Sam Darnold – 25/36, 346 yards, 3 TD

Top rushers

- LAR – Blake Corum – 9 rushes, 55 yards
- SEA – Kenneth Walker III – 19 rushes, 62 yards, TD

Top receivers

- LAR – Puka Nacua – 9 receptions, 165 yards, TD
- SEA – Jaxon Smith-Njigba – 10 receptions, 153 yards, TD

In a fiercely fought rematch of NFC West rivals, Los Angeles fell short against host Seattle at Lumen Field in its bid to reach Super Bowl LX. It was the first time that the Rams had lost in the NFC Championship Game since 1989 (breaking a four-game franchise winning streak), and the first playoff loss to the Seahawks in team history following road victories in 2004 and 2020. After the Seahawks took an early lead, kicker Harrison Mevis kept the Rams close with a pair of field goals (44, 50) in the first half. Late in the second period, Los Angeles took its first (and ultimately, only) lead of the game 13–10 on a 9-yard touchdown pass from quarterback Matthew Stafford to running back Kyren Williams that finished off a 12-play, 87-yard drive. But Seattle was able to go back on top as quarterback Sam Darnold threw touchdown passes to wide receiver Jaxon Smith-Njigba (14 yards) and wide receiver Jake Bobo (17 yards). The second TD came immediately after a disastrous muffed punt by Rams return man Xavier Smith that was recovered by the Seahawks early in the third quarter and converted into a 24–13 lead. L.A. responded with a quick 75-yard drive that took just four plays, with Stafford throwing a 2-yard TD pass to wide receiver Davante Adams. But Seattle came back and again increased its lead to 11 points on Darnold's third touchdown pass of the day, a 13-yard strike over the middle to wide receiver Cooper Kupp. The Rams started their next offensive drive at their own 13-yard line and moved out to midfield before stalling. But a critical taunting penalty on Seattle cornerback Riq Woolen gave Los Angeles a first down at the Seahawks' 34-yard line. From there, Stafford lofted a perfect pass to wide receiver Puka Nacua, who beat Woolen's coverage at the goal line for a Rams' touchdown to close the gap to 31–27. After forcing the Seahawks to punt early in the fourth quarter, L.A. started from its own 10 and methodically marched 84 yards in 14 plays in a drive that consumed 7:24 off the clock and reached the Seattle 6-yard line after Stafford threw a 6-yard pass to Nacua on first down. But Williams was held for no gain and Stafford's end zone passes on third and fourth down fell incomplete with 4:54 remaining. The Seahawks were able to maintain possession and drain the clock on their final offensive series, with a key play coming on a 7-yard pass from Darnold to Kupp on third-and-7 (Kupp had four receptions for 36 yards and a TD against his former team) to keep the drive alive. Seattle was finally forced to punt, and L.A. took over at its own 7 with just 25 seconds and no time outs remaining. Stafford and Nacua connected on passes of 23 and 21 yards to get the ball out to the Seattle 49 with 0:03 left on the clock, but Seahawks cornerback Devon Witherspoon was able to keep Nacua from getting out of bounds and the final whistle sounded before the Rams could get off another play. Stafford had another standout performance, completing 22 of 35 passes for 374 yards and three touchdowns with no interceptions while Nacua recorded nine receptions for 165 yards, becoming only the second player ever to record over 2,000 combined receiving yards (regular season and playoffs) with 2,047, joining former Ram Kupp, who had 2,425 yards in 2021. Adams added four receptions for 89 yards and a TD and running back Blake Corum had 55 yards on nine carries to lead the Rams on the ground. Inside linebacker Omar Speights had 11 total tackles, while defensive end Braden Fiske, outside linebacker Jared Verse and free safety Kamren Kinchens all had sacks as L.A.'s season came to an end.

== Awards and honors ==
Recipient	Award(s)
Ethan Evans	Week 11: NFC Special Teams Player of the Week
Nate Landman	Week 1: NFC Defensive Player of the Week
Puka Nacua	Week 4: NFC Offensive Player of the Week; Week 14: NFC Offensive Player of the Week
Matthew Stafford	November: NFC Offensive Player of the Month; December/January: NFC Offensive Player of the Month; Week 18: NFC Offensive Player of the Week; NFL Most Valuable Player
Byron Young	September: NFC Defensive Player of the Month
