= Omar Speights =

American football player (born 2001)

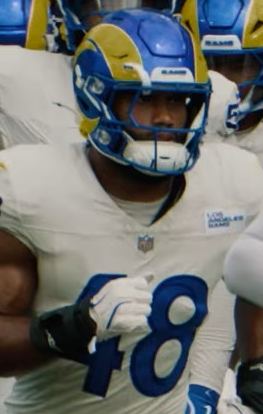
- Speights with the Los Angeles Rams in 2025

No. 48 – Los Angeles Rams
- Position: Inside linebacker
- Roster status: Active

Personal information
- Born: March 2, 2001 (age 25); Philadelphia, Pennsylvania, U.S.
- Listed height: 6 ft 1 in (1.85 m)
- Listed weight: 234 lb (106 kg)

Career information
- High school: Crescent Valley (Corvallis, Oregon)
- College: Oregon State (2019–2022); LSU (2023)
- NFL draft: 2024: undrafted

Career history
- Los Angeles Rams (2024–present)

Awards and highlights
- First-team All-Pac-12 (2022)

Career NFL statistics as of 2025
- Total tackles: 152
- Pass deflections: 3
- Stats at Pro Football Reference

Omar Speights (born March 2, 2001) is an American professional football inside linebacker for the Los Angeles Rams of the National Football League (NFL). He played college football for the Oregon State Beavers and LSU Tigers.

== Early life ==
Speights was born in West Philadelphia, Pennsylvania, by single mother Patricia. where he attended Imhotep Charter and Northeast High School. In his senior year, Speights attended Crescent Valley High School in Corvallis, Oregon. A four-star recruit, Speights committed to play college football at Oregon State University.

== College career ==
=== Oregon State ===
As a true freshman in 2019, Speights recorded 71 total tackles, 3.5 sacks, and an interception. As a result, he was named a Freshman All-American. The following year, he tallied 63 total tackles and a team-leading 4.5 tackles for loss. In 2022, Speights was named to the First-team All-Pac-12, after totaling 83 tackles. In January 2023, Speights announced he would enter the transfer portal. Speights finished with 308 total tackles, five sacks, three interceptions, and three fumble recoveries in four seasons with Oregon State. He finished ninth in school history for most tackles in a career.

=== LSU ===
On January 19, 2023, Speights announced he would be transferring to Louisiana State University to play for the LSU Tigers.

== Professional career ==
Pre-draft measurables
Height	Weight	Arm length	Hand span	Wingspan	40-yard dash	10-yard split	20-yard split	20-yard shuttle	Three-cone drill	Vertical jump	Broad jump	Bench press
6 ft 0 5/8 in (1.84 m)	225 lb (102 kg)	31 1/4 in (0.79 m)	9 1/4 in (0.23 m)	6 ft 3 1/8 in (1.91 m)	4.62 s	1.58 s	2.62 s	4.34 s	7.06 s	31.5 in (0.80 m)	10 ft 0 in (3.05 m)	30 reps
All values from Pro Day

Speights signed with the Los Angeles Rams as an undrafted free agent on May 2, 2024. He made the Rams' 53 man roster out of training camp as a UDFA. He was named as a starter in the middle of the season, and finished the season playing in all 17 games with 10 starts, recording 67 tackles and two passes defensed.

Speights was named a starting inside linebacker alongside Nate Landman to begin the 2025 season.

== NFL career statistics ==
Legend
**Bold**	Career high

=== Regular season ===
Year	Team	Games		Tackles					Interceptions						Fumbles				
Year	Team	GP	GS	Cmb	Solo	Ast	Sck	TFL	Int	Yds	Avg	Lng	TD	PD	FF	Fum	FR	Yds	TD
2024	LAR	**17**	10	67	37	30	0.0	**2**	0	0	0.0	0	0	**2**	0	0	0	0	0
2025	LAR	16	**16**	**85**	**45**	**40**	0.0	0	0	0	0.0	0	0	1	0	0	0	0	0
Career		33	26	152	82	70	0.0	2	0	0	0.0	0	0	3	0	0	0	0	0

=== Postseason ===
Year	Team	Games		Tackles					Interceptions						Fumbles				
Year	Team	GP	GS	Cmb	Solo	Ast	Sck	TFL	Int	Yds	Avg	Lng	TD	PD	FF	Fum	FR	Yds	TD
2024	LAR	2	2	11	7	4	**1.0**	**1**	0	0	0.0	0	0	0	**1**	0	0	0	0
2025	LAR	**3**	**3**	**21**	**12**	**9**	0.0	**1**	0	0	0.0	0	0	**2**	0	0	0	0	0
Career		5	5	32	19	13	1.0	2	0	0	0.0	0	0	2	1	0	0	0	0
