= Matthew Harper (American football) =

American football coach (born 1984)

Profile
- Position: Assistant coach

Personal information
- Born: November 26, 1984 (age 41); Secaucus, New Jersey, U.S.
- Listed height: 6 ft 0 in (1.83 m)
- Listed weight: 177 lb (80 kg)

Career information
- College: City College of San Francisco (2004–2005); Oregon (2006–2007)

Career history
- City College of San Francisco (2008) Safeties coach; Oregon (2009–2011) Coaching intern; Oregon (2012) Graduate assistant; Philadelphia Eagles (2013–2014) Assistant special teams coach; Philadelphia Eagles (2015) Assistant defensive backs coach; Philadelphia Eagles (2016–2018) Assistant special teams coach; Philadelphia Eagles (2019-2020) Assistant wide receivers coach; San Francisco 49ers (2021–2024) Assistant special teams coach; Los Angeles Rams (2025) Assistant special teams coach

Awards and highlights
- Super Bowl champion (LII); JC Gridwire All-American (2005); First-team All-Nor-Cal Conference (2005)

Matthew Harper (born November 26, 1984) is an American football coach who has coached more than a dozen years in the National Football League (NFL). Most recently an assistant special teams coach for the Los Angeles Rams, he previously was a coach for the City College of San Francisco, Oregon Ducks, Philadelphia Eagles, and San Francisco 49ers.

== Early life & playing career ==
The son of former San Francisco 49ers linebacker Willie Harper, Matthew Harper grew up in Union City, California and played for James Logan High School. As a senior, he recorded 60 tackles and four interceptions for the Colts and earned all-league honors. Harper then moved on to play for City College of San Francisco, where in two seasons with the Rams, he twice earned All-NorCal Conference recognitions and in 2005 was named a JC All-American.

In 2006, Harper transferred to Oregon and played defensive back for the Ducks in 2006 and 2007.

== Coaching career ==
Following the end of his playing career, Harper returned to CCSF and served one season as safeties coach before returning to Oregon. He spent three seasons as a coaching intern and one as a graduate assistant.

In 2014, Harper was hired by the Philadelphia Eagles of the National Football League, where he spent the next six seasons on the coaching staff. Beginning as an assistant on special teams, he spent one season (2015) as assistant defensive backs coach before returning to special teams for the next three seasons. In 2017, he won Super Bowl LII with the Eagles. Harper was named wide receivers coach in 2019, and remained in that position for two seasons.

In 2021, Harper was hired by the San Francisco 49ers as assistant special teams coach. In four seasons, he helped the 49ers reach the NFC Championship Game three times and an appearance in Super Bowl LVIII at the end of the 2023 season.

On December 22, 2025, Harper was hired by the Los Angeles Rams as an interim special teams assistant, following the dismissal of special teams coach Chase Blackburn and the elevation of assistant specials teams coach Ben Kotwica. Harper coached with the Rams for the remainder of the regular season and throughout L.A.'s playoff run, which ended with a loss to Seattle in the NFC Championship Game.
