= Xavier Smith =

American football player (born 1997)

No. 14 – Los Angeles Rams
- Position: Wide receiver
- Roster status: Active

Personal information
- Born: September 21, 1997 (age 29); Haines City, Florida, U.S.
- Listed height: 5 ft 9 in (1.75 m)
- Listed weight: 180 lb (82 kg)

Career information
- High school: Haines City (Haines City)
- College: Florida A&M (2017–2022)
- NFL draft: 2023: undrafted

Career history
- Los Angeles Rams (2023–2026); San Francisco 49ers (2026)*; Los Angeles Rams (2026–present)
- * Offseason or practice squad member only

Career NFL statistics as of Week 9, 2026
- Receptions: 20
- Receiving yards: 309
- Rushing yards: 36
- Return yards: 1,069
- Stats at Pro Football Reference

Xavier Smith (born September 21, 1997) is an American professional football wide receiver for the Los Angeles Rams of the National Football League (NFL). He played college football for the Florida A&M Rattlers and was signed by the Rams as an undrafted free agent in 2023.

== Early life ==
Smith was born on September 21, 1997, in Haines City, Florida. He attended Ridge Community High School, then transferred to Haines City High School where he played running back. Being small, at 5 feet 9 inches (1.75 m) and 155 pounds (70 kg), and without significant statistics, he received no offers to play college football. He developed a highlight film and contacted over 100 college coaches, but received no interest. After he graduated from Haines City, he initially quit playing football, spending 2016 working with Amazon.

== College career ==
Smith applied for Florida A&M University in 2017 at the suggestion of his mother, who had attended there. After being accepted, he tried out for the Florida A&M Rattlers football team as a walk-on and ultimately made the team. His brother, Kareem, had previously played with the Rattlers, and Smith wore the same jersey number 19 as his brother had. Smith redshirted as a true freshman in 2017, being a member of the scout team, while becoming a wide receiver. In 2018, he broke out with 52 receptions for 727 yards, being the team leader in both categories as well as a second-team All-Mid-Eastern Athletic Conference (MEAC) selection.

In 2019, Smith totaled 77 catches for 1,159 yards and 11 touchdowns, being fifth nationally in receiving yards per game, ninth in receptions per game, 10th in receiving yards and 16th in touchdown catches. He received several honors including first-team All-MEAC, BoxToRow All-American, second-team American Football Coaches Association] (AFCA) All-American, and HERO Sports sophomore All-American. The 2020 season was canceled due to the COVID-19 pandemic.

Smith recorded 64 catches for 713 yards and three touchdowns in the 2021 season, being the team leader in receiving and placing sixth in the Southwestern Athletic Conference (SWAC). As a senior in 2022, he caught 87 passes for 1,021 yards and 11 touchdowns, being named an HBCU All-American and All-SWAC while leading the conference in receiving. He ended his collegiate career with 44 games played and 193 catches for 2,599 yards. He was invited to the HBCU Legacy Bowl all-star game following the 2022 season, where he caught six passes for 85 yards and a touchdown while being named the offensive MVP.

== Professional career ==
Pre-draft measurables
Height	Weight	Arm length	Hand span	Wingspan	40-yard dash	10-yard split	20-yard split	20-yard shuttle	Three-cone drill	Vertical jump	Broad jump	Bench press
5 ft 9 1/8 in (1.76 m)	174 lb (79 kg)	29 1/4 in (0.74 m)	9 in (0.23 m)	5 ft 11 1/8 in (1.81 m)	4.48 s	1.52 s	2.52 s	4.16 s	7.19 s	36.5 in (0.93 m)	9 ft 8 in (2.95 m)	13 reps
All values from HBCU Combine/Pro Day

=== Los Angeles Rams (first stint) ===
After going unselected in the 2023 NFL draft, Smith signed with the Los Angeles Rams as an undrafted free agent. He was waived at the final roster cuts and subsequently re-signed to the practice squad. After having spent the entire season on the practice squad, he signed a reserve/future contract with the Rams on January 16, 2024.

Smith was waived by the Rams on August 27, 2024, and re-signed to the practice squad. He was elevated to the active roster on September 21, and made his NFL debut the following day in Week 3 against the San Francisco 49ers. With under a minute remaining in the game and the score tied, Smith's 38-yard punt return to midfield helped set up the Rams' game-winning field goal. He was signed to the active roster on October 17.

After a loss in the 2025 NFC Championship game against the Seattle Seahawks, Smith received criticism for a muffed punt inside the 20-yard line, which led to a Seahawks touchdown. On March 2, 2026, the Rams announced that they were tendering Smith as an exclusive rights free agent. Smith was waived on October 2.

=== San Francisco 49ers ===
On October 7, 2026, Smith signed with the San Francisco 49ers practice squad.

=== Los Angeles Rams (second stint) ===
On November 10, 2026, Smith was signed by the Los Angeles Rams off the 49ers practice squad.

== NFL career statistics ==
Legend
**Bold**	Career high

=== Regular season ===
Year	Team	Games		Receiving					Rushing					Punt returns					Kick returns					Fumbles		
Year	Team	GP	GS	Rec	Yds	Avg	Lng	TD	Att	Yds	Avg	Lng	TD	Ret	Yds	Avg	Lng	TD	Ret	Yds	Avg	Lng	TD	Fum	Lost	FR
2024	LAR	15	0	2	6	3.0	11	0	4	36	9.0	24	0	16	149	9.3	38	0	6	155	25.8	34	0	0	0	0
2025	LAR	16	3	18	303	16.8	51	0	0	0	0.0	0	0	27	251	9.3	31	0	13	301	23.2	32	0	0	0	0
2026	LAR	3	0	0	0	0.0	0	0	0	0	0.0	0	0	7	69	9.9	19	0	7	144	20.6	29	0	0	0	0
Career		31	3	20	309	15.5	51	0	4	36	9.0	24	0	50	469	9.4	38	0	26	600	23.1	34	0	0	0	0

=== Postseason ===
Year	Team	Games		Receiving					Rushing					Punt returns					Kick returns					Fumbles		
Year	Team	GP	GS	Rec	Yds	Avg	Lng	TD	Att	Yds	Avg	Lng	TD	Ret	Yds	Avg	Lng	TD	Ret	Yds	Avg	Lng	TD	Fum	Lost	FR
2024	LAR	2	0	0	0	0.0	0	0	0	0	0.0	0	0	3	29	9.7	18	0	0	0	0.0	0	0	0	0	0
2025	LAR	3	0	0	0	0.0	0	0	0	0	0.0	0	0	3	-2	-0.7	0	0	0	0	0.0	0	0	2	1	1
Career		5	0	0	0	0.0	0	0	0	0	0.0	0	0	6	27	4.5	18	0	0	0	0.0	0	0	2	1	1
