= Terrance Ferguson (American football) =

American football tight end (born 2003)

No. 18 – Los Angeles Rams
- Position: Tight end
- Roster status: Injured reserve

Personal information
- Born: March 7, 2003 (age 23)
- Listed height: 6 ft 5 in (1.96 m)
- Listed weight: 252 lb (114 kg)

Career information
- High school: Heritage (Littleton, Colorado)
- College: Oregon (2021–2024)
- NFL draft: 2025: 2nd round, 46th overall pick

Career history
- Los Angeles Rams (2025–present)

Awards and highlights
- First-team All-Pac-12 (2023); Third-team All-Big Ten (2024)

Career NFL statistics as of Week 3, 2026
- Receptions: 18
- Receiving yards: 294
- Receiving touchdowns: 4
- Stats at Pro Football Reference

Terrance Ferguson (born March 7, 2003) is an American professional football tight end for the Los Angeles Rams of the National Football League (NFL). He played college football for the Oregon Ducks and was selected by the Rams in the second round of the 2025 NFL draft.

== Early life ==
Ferguson was born on March 7, 2003, in Littleton, Colorado. He attended Heritage High School in Littleton, Colorado. As a junior, he hauled in 54 receptions for 929 yards and 11 touchdowns. Coming out of high school, Ferguson was rated as the No. 10 tight end nationally. Ferguson committed to play college football for the Oregon Ducks.

== College career ==
As a freshman in 2021, Ferguson had 17 receptions for 141 yards and two touchdowns for the Ducks. In their 2022 bowl game, he hauled in five receptions for 84 yards in a win over North Carolina. Ferguson finished the 2022 season with 32 receptions for 391 yards and five touchdowns. In 2023, he was named first-team all-Pac-12. Ferguson finished with a career high 43 catches in the 2024 season. His collegiate career came to an end after Oregon's loss to Ohio State in the 2025 Rose Bowl Game.

== Professional career ==
Pre-draft measurables
Height	Weight	Arm length	Hand span	Wingspan	40-yard dash	10-yard split	20-yard split	Vertical jump	Broad jump	Bench press
6 ft 5 3/8 in (1.97 m)	247 lb (112 kg)	32 7/8 in (0.84 m)	9 1/4 in (0.23 m)	6 ft 8 1/8 in (2.04 m)	4.63 s	1.55 s	2.67 s	39.0 in (0.99 m)	10 ft 2 in (3.10 m)	15 reps
All values from NFL Combine/Pro Day

The Los Angeles Rams selected Ferguson in the second round (46th overall) of the 2025 NFL draft. On July 19, 2025, Ferguson signed a four-year contract worth $9.71 million just prior to the opening of training camp.

=== 2025 season ===
Ferguson played briefly on offense and special teams in the Rams' first two games of the season, then was inactive the next two games. His first career reception did not come until Week 5 on a 21-yard pass from quarterback Matthew Stafford to help set up a second quarter touchdown in the Rams' 26-23 overtime loss to San Francisco. Against Jacksonville in Week 8, Ferguson caught his first career touchdown on a 31-yard pass from Stafford as the Rams routed the Jaguars 35-7. In Week 16, Ferguson caught a season single-game high three passes for 33 yards and a touchdown in L.A.'s 38-37 overtime loss at Seattle, then had two receptions for 54 yards and a touchdown in a 27-24 loss at Atlanta. He played in 14 games (including three starts) and finished the regular season with 11 receptions for 231 yards and three touchdowns, with six of his receptions going for 25 or more yards. Ferguson was inactive for the Rams' regular season finale and first playoff game. Against the Chicago Bears in an NFC Divisional playoff, Ferguson caught one pass for 19 yards in the Rams' 20-17 overtime win. Although he made his first career playoff start in the NFC Championship Game against Seattle, Ferguson was held without a catch and was the intended target on a fourth down play with about five minutes left, but was unable to come up with the touchdown reception as the Seahawks held on to beat the Rams 31-27 and advance to Super Bowl LX.

=== 2026 season ===
After being held without a reception in the Rams' 27-7 loss in Melbourne, Australia to San Francisco in Week 1, Ferguson caught six passes for 54 yards, including a 5-yard TD reception from Stafford for the final score, in L.A.'s 28-6 victory over the New York Giants on Monday Night Football. Ferguson had one reception for nine yards in Week 3 against the Denver Broncos on Sunday Night Football, but injured an ankle on the play and on October 3, 2026 was placed on injured reserve.

== NFL career statistics ==
=== Regular season ===
Year	Team	Games		Receiving						Fumbles	
Year	Team	GP	GS	Tgt	Rec	Yds	Avg	Lng	TD	Fum	Lost
2025	LAR	14	3	25	11	231	21.0	36	3	0	0
2026	LAR	3	3	12	7	63	9.0	20	1	0	0
Career		17	6	37	18	294	16.3	36	4	0	0

=== Postseason ===
Year	Team	Games		Receiving					Fumbles	
Year	Team	GP	GS	Rec	Yds	Avg	Lng	TD	Fum	Lost
2025	LAR	2	1	1	19	19.0	19	0	0	0
Career		2	1	1	19	19.0	19	0	0	0
