= Byron Young (linebacker) =

American football player (born 1998)

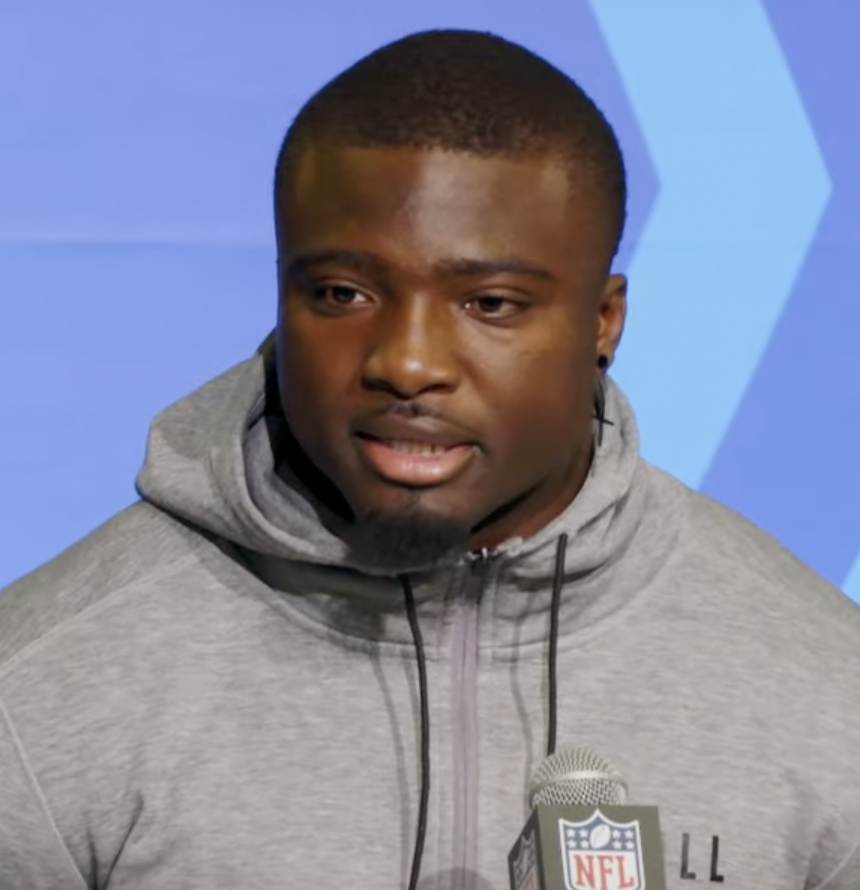
- Young at the 2023 NFL Combine

No. 0 – Los Angeles Rams
- Position: Outside linebacker
- Roster status: Active

Personal information
- Born: March 13, 1998 (age 28); Georgetown, South Carolina, U.S.
- Listed height: 6 ft 2 in (1.88 m)
- Listed weight: 260 lb (118 kg)

Career information
- High school: Carvers Bay (Hemingway, South Carolina)
- College: Georgia Military (2020); Tennessee (2021–2022)
- NFL draft: 2023: 3rd round, 77th overall pick

Career history
- Los Angeles Rams (2023–present)

Awards and highlights
- Pro Bowl (2025); PFWA All-Rookie Team (2023); First-team All-SEC (2022)

Career NFL statistics as of Week 10, 2026
- Total tackles: 244
- Sacks: 33.0
- Forced fumbles: 5
- Fumble recoveries: 2
- Pass deflections: 2
- Safeties: 1
- Stats at Pro Football Reference

Byron Young (born March 13, 1998) is an American professional football outside linebacker for the Los Angeles Rams of the National Football League (NFL). He played college football for the Georgia Military Bulldogs and Tennessee Volunteers.

== Early life ==
Young attended Carvers Bay High School in Hemingway, South Carolina. Barely recruited coming out of high school, Young worked at Dollar General before walking on at Georgia Military College in 2020.

== College career ==
Following one season at Georgia Military College, Young was the tenth-ranked Junior College prospect and committed to Tennessee over Ole Miss. Initially a backup in his first season at the University of Tennessee in 2021, Young started the last eight games recording 46 total tackles and led the team with 5.5 sacks.

In the Volunteers Week 6 game against LSU in 2022, Young recorded 2.5 sacks and was named the Southeastern Conference (SEC) defensive lineman of the week for his performance. At the conclusion of the season, he was named to the All-SEC first team.

== Professional career ==
Pre-draft measurables
Height	Weight	Arm length	Hand span	Wingspan	40-yard dash	10-yard split	20-yard split	Three-cone drill	Vertical jump	Broad jump	Bench press
6 ft 2 3/8 in (1.89 m)	250 lb (113 kg)	32 1/2 in (0.83 m)	9 1/4 in (0.23 m)	6 ft 7 1/8 in (2.01 m)	4.43 s	1.62 s	2.58 s	7.19 s	38.0 in (0.97 m)	11 ft 0 in (3.35 m)	22 reps
All values from NFL Combine

Young was selected in the third round (77th overall) by the Los Angeles Rams in the 2023 NFL draft. The Rams acquired the 77th overall pick from the Miami Dolphins after trading cornerback Jalen Ramsey for tight end Hunter Long.

Heading into his first training camp & preseason, Byron Young was a starting outside linebacker. At the end of the NFL preseason, head coach Sean McVay named Young a starting outside linebacker to begin the season, opposite Michael Hoecht.

Byron Young made his first career start and NFL debut in the Rams' Week 1 victory against the Seattle Seahawks, notching his first career split-sack and playing in 84% of the defensive snaps during the win. The following week, he notched his first full career sack in the Rams' 30–23 loss to the San Francisco 49ers. He would notch another half-sack in the Rams' 16–19 loss to the Cincinnati Bengals the following week. Against the Green Bay Packers in Week 9, Young recorded his first multi-sack game, although the Rams lost 20–3. He finished the season recording three more sacks in his final five games of the season.

As a rookie, Young played in all 17 games (16 starts) and played in 85% of the team's defensive snaps. He finished his rookie season leading all rookie edge rushers with 8 sacks, 61 total tackles (42 solo), two forced fumbles, and one fumble recovery. Additionally, Young earned PFWA All-Rookie Team honors at the end of the season.

== NFL career statistics ==
Legend
	Led the league
**Bold**	Career high

=== Regular season ===
Year	Team	Games		Tackles						Fumbles				Interceptions			
Year	Team	GP	GS	Cmb	Solo	Ast	Sck	Sfty	TFL	FF	FR	Yds	TD	Int	Yds	TD	PD
2023	LAR	17	16	61	42	19	8.0	0	8	**2**	**1**	0	0	0	0	0	0
2024	LAR	17	16	62	33	28	7.5	**1**	**12**	1	0	0	0	0	0	0	**1**
2025	LAR	17	17	**82**	**45**	**37**	**12.0**	0	**12**	1	0	0	0	0	0	0	0
2026	LAR	10	10	39	18	21	5.5	0	7	1	1	0	0	0	0	0	1
Career		61	59	244	139	105	33.0	1	39	5	2	0	0	0	0	0	2

=== Postseason ===
Year	Team	Games		Tackles						Fumbles				Interceptions			
Year	Team	GP	GS	Cmb	Solo	Ast	Sck	Sfty	TFL	FF	FR	Yds	TD	Int	Yds	TD	PD
2023	LAR	1	1	3	3	0	0.0	0	1	0	0	0	0	0	0	0	0
2024	LAR	2	2	6	**4**	2	**1.5**	0	**2**	0	0	0	0	0	0	0	0
2025	LAR	3	3	**8**	3	**5**	0.0	0	**2**	0	0	0	0	0	0	0	0
Career		6	6	17	10	7	1.5	0	5	0	0	0	0	0	0	0	0
