= Nate Valcarcel =

American football player (born 2002)

Louisville Kings
- Position: Safety
- Roster status: Unsigned draft pick

Personal information
- Born: May 23, 2002 (age 24); Greenfield, Wisconsin, U.S.
- Listed height: 6 ft 1 in (1.85 m)
- Listed weight: 194 lb (88 kg)

Career information
- High school: Whitnall (Greenfield)
- College: South Dakota (2020); Northern Illinois (2021–2024)
- NFL draft: 2025: undrafted

Career history
- Los Angeles Rams (2025–2026)*; Louisville Kings (2027-present)
- * Offseason or practice squad member only

Awards and highlights
- First-team All-MAC (2024)
- Stats at Pro Football Reference

Nate Phouthachack Valcarcel (born May 23, 2002) is an American professional football safety. He played college football for the South Dakota Coyotes and the Northern Illinois Huskies.

== College career ==
Valcarcel played college football for the South Dakota Coyotes in 2020 and the Northern Illinois Huskies from 2021 to 2024. At South Dakota, he played in all four games of the shortened season on special teams. Valcarcel then transferred to Northern Illinois, where he played in 52 games, recording 113 tackles, including four tackles for loss, 2.5 sacks, six interceptions, nine pass deflections and two fumble recoveries. In 2024, he started every game at free safety, leading the team in interceptions, earning first-team all-MAC honors.

== Professional career ==
Pre-draft measurables
Height	Weight	Arm length	Hand span	Wingspan	40-yard dash	10-yard split	20-yard split	20-yard shuttle	Three-cone drill	Vertical jump	Broad jump	Bench press
5 ft 11 3/4 in (1.82 m)	194 lb (88 kg)	30 5/8 in (0.78 m)	9 1/4 in (0.23 m)	6 ft 2 1/8 in (1.88 m)	4.53 s	1.55 s	2.63 s	4.13 s	6.90 s	34.5 in (0.88 m)	9 ft 8 in (2.95 m)	12 reps
All values from Pro Day

After not being selected in the 2025 NFL draft, Valcarcel signed with the Los Angeles Rams as an undrafted free agent. He was waived on August 26, before he was signed to the practice squad the following day. Valcarcel was released on January 6, 2026. He signed a reserve/future contract with Los Angeles on January 21. On August 29, Valcarcel was waived by the Rams.

== Personal life ==
Valcarcel is of Lao descent.
