= Nate Landman =

American football player (born 1998)

No. 53 – Los Angeles Rams
- Position: Inside linebacker
- Roster status: Active

Personal information
- Born: 19 November 1998 (age 27); Harare, Zimbabwe
- Listed height: 6 ft 3 in (1.91 m)
- Listed weight: 234 lb (106 kg)

Career information
- High school: Monte Vista (Danville, California, U.S.)
- College: Colorado (2017–2021)
- NFL draft: 2022: undrafted

Career history
- Atlanta Falcons (2022–2024); Los Angeles Rams (2025–present)

Awards and highlights
- 2× First-team All-Pac-12 (2019, 2020); Second-team All-Pac-12 (2021)

Career NFL statistics as of Week 5, 2026
- Total tackles: 365
- Sacks: 4.5
- Forced fumbles: 12
- Fumble recoveries: 2
- Interceptions: 2
- Pass deflections: 11
- Stats at Pro Football Reference

Nathan Landman (born 19 November 1998) is a Zimbabwean-American professional football inside linebacker for the Los Angeles Rams of the National Football League (NFL). He played college football for the Colorado Buffaloes.

== Early life ==
Landman was born on 19 November 1998, in Harare, Zimbabwe, where his father, Shaun, was playing rugby union. When his family moved to the United States, they settled in Danville, California. He became a U.S. citizen during his second year of college.

He attended Monte Vista High School and played baseball, rugby union and football. Landman played wide receiver as well as linebacker earning accolades in both positions. Over his four varsity years Landman amassed over 1,000 yards receiving and made over 160 tackles, 15 sacks and 4 interceptions. In his senior year Landman led Monte Vista in a state playoff run. In his final season Landman was the East Bay Athletic League MVP. He was awarded All-NorCal High School Football Team by MaxPreps and East Bay Defensive Player of the Year by the San Jose Times. He was named to all district and state teams for his final two seasons.

Landman was ranked as the 5th best linebacker and 57th best player in California by ESPN. Scout.com had Landman as high as 2nd and 33rd.

College recruiting
Name	Hometown	School	Height	Weight	40^{‡}	Commit date
Nate Landman; LB	Danville, CA	Monte Vista	6 ft 3 in (1.91 m)	205 lb (93 kg)	4.88	Jul 20, 2016
Nate Landman; LB	Recruit ratings: Scout: Rivals: 247Sports: ESPN: (73)					
Overall recruit ranking: Scout: 77 Rivals: 79 247Sports: 85 ESPN: 73
‡ Refers to 40-yard dash; Note: In many cases, Scout, Rivals, 247Sports, On3, and ESPN may conflict in their listings of height, weight and 40 time.; In these cases, the average was taken. ESPN grades are on a 100-point scale.; Sources: "2017 Team Ranking". Rivals.com.

Landman had offers from multiple major Division I programs, including Arizona, Boise State, Colorado State, Hawaii, Nevada, Oregon State, Washington State, and Wyoming. Landman committed to college football at Colorado on 20 July 2016.

== College career ==
Landman was given significant playing time as a true freshman, playing mostly special teams but also on defense. In his college debut against Texas State, Landman recorded one tackle for a loss. Later that year against Utah, Landman had six tackles and a forced fumble in a starting role. Landman came into the 2018 Colorado football season as a starter; in the first game, he made a career-high 16 tackles and had an interception against rival Colorado State. Landman continued with 13 tackles and another interception against Nebraska on national television.

Landman finished the season with 104 total tackles (64 solo), four sacks, and two interceptions. In early 2019, Landman received an All-Pac-12 Conference from the coaches and media.

== Professional career ==
Pre-draft measurables
Height	Weight	Arm length	Hand span	Wingspan	40-yard dash	10-yard split	20-yard split	20-yard shuttle	Three-cone drill	Vertical jump	Broad jump	Bench press
6 ft 2 1/2 in (1.89 m)	238 lb (108 kg)	30 1/2 in (0.77 m)	9 3/8 in (0.24 m)	6 ft 4 in (1.93 m)	4.86 s	1.58 s	2.80 s	4.43 s	7.05 s	36.5 in (0.93 m)	9 ft 11 in (3.02 m)	20 reps
All values from NFL Combine/Pro Day

=== Atlanta Falcons ===
Landman signed with the Atlanta Falcons as an undrafted free agent on 2 May 2022. He made the Falcons' initial 53-man roster out of training camp. He was released on 10 December 2022, and re-signed to the practice squad. As a rookie, he appeared in seven games in the 2022 season. Landman signed a reserve/future contract with the Falcons on 9 January 2023. In the 2023 season, he appeared in 16 games and made 14 starts. He finished with two sacks, 110 total tackles (66 solo), one interception, three passes defended, and three forced fumbles.

On 16 September 2024, Landman was placed on injured reserve. On 12 October, Landman came off injured reserve and was activated to the 53-man roster.

=== Los Angeles Rams ===
On 18 March 2025, Landman signed a one-year contract with the Los Angeles Rams. He was named a starting inside linebacker to begin the season. In Week 1 against the Houston Texans, he forced a fumble, had 10 tackles, and earned NFC Defensive Player of the Week honors.

On 22 November 2025, Landman signed a three-year, $22.5 million contract extension with the Rams.

== NFL career statistics ==
=== Regular season ===
Year	Team	Games		Tackles					Fumbles				Interceptions			
Year	Team	GP	GS	Cmb	Solo	Ast	Sck	TFL	FF	FR	Yds	TD	Int	Yds	TD	PD
2022	ATL	7	0	1	0	1	0	0	0	0	0	0	0	0	0	0
2023	ATL	16	14	110	66	44	2	7	3	0	0	0	1	25	0	3
2024	ATL	13	9	81	39	42	0	0	3	0	0	0	0	0	0	1
2025	LAR	17	17	132	64	68	2.5	8	4	2	0	0	1	0	0	6
2026	LAR	5	5	41	21	20	0.0	2	2	0	0	0	0	0	0	1
Career		58	45	365	190	175	4.5	17	12	2	0	0	2	25	0	11

=== Postseason ===
Year	Team	Games		Tackles					Fumbles				Interceptions			
Year	Team	GP	GS	Cmb	Solo	Ast	Sck	TFL	FF	FR	Yds	TD	Int	Yds	TD	PD
2025	LAR	3	3	26	13	13	0	2	1	0	0	0	0	0	0	2
Career		3	3	26	13	13	0	2	1	0	0	0	0	0	0	2

=== NFL records ===
- Most tackles in a single game in franchise (Rams) history (17)

== Personal life ==
Landman has three siblings: Ty, Brendan, and Ocean. Brendan played college football at Arizona State and Ocean swam collegiately at Oregon State.

He is often referred to as the "Nateland Man" on the "Nateland" podcast, a podcast hosted by comedians Nate Bargatze, Dusty Slay, Aaron Weber and Brian Bates.

Landman is married to former Colorado Buffaloes volleyball player Brynna DeLuzio.
