= Ben Kotwica =

American football player and coach (born 1974)

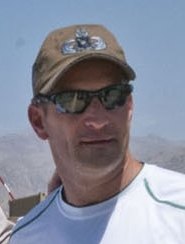
- Kotwica in 2012

Baltimore Ravens
- Title: Senior special teams assistant

Personal information
- Born: December 8, 1974 (age 51); Tinley Park, Illinois, U.S.

Career information
- Position: Linebacker
- College: Army (1993–1996)

Career history
- USMA Prep School (2005–2006) Defensive coordinator; New York Jets (2007–2013); Defense/Special teams quality control (2007-2008); Assistant special teams coach (2009-2012); Special teams coordinator (2013); Washington Redskins (2014–2018) Special teams coordinator; Atlanta Falcons (2019–2020) Special teams coordinator; Army (2021) Director of player development; Minnesota Vikings (2022) Assistant special teams coach; Denver Broncos (2023–2024) Special teams coordinator; Los Angeles Rams (2025) Assistant special teams coach/Interim special teams coordinator; Baltimore Ravens (2026–present) Senior special teams assistant

Ben Kotwica (born, December 8, 1974) is an American professional football coach and former linebacker who is a senior special teams assistant for the Baltimore Ravens of the National Football League (NFL). He has coached special teams for numerous NFL teams, having served previously as special teams coordinator for the New York Jets, Washington Redskins, Atlanta Falcons, and Denver Broncos. He has also served as the interim special teams coordinator for the Los Angeles Rams.

== College career and military service ==
Kotwica was a linebacker and team captain for Army from 1993 to 1996. Before his career in coaching, Kotwica served in the United States Army as a helicopter pilot, reaching the rank of Captain by 2004. In addition to missions in Bosnia and Herzegovina and Korea, he is a veteran of the Iraq War.

== Coaching career ==
=== New York Jets ===
In 2007, Kotwica was hired by the New York Jets to be their defense/special teams quality control coach. In 2013, Kotwica was promoted to special teams coordinator.

=== Washington Redskins ===
On January 15, 2014, the Washington Redskins announced Kotwica as their special teams coordinator, serving under newly appointed head coach, Jay Gruden. After coaching five seasons with the Redskins, Kotwica requested and was granted permission to interview with other teams.

=== Atlanta Falcons ===
The Atlanta Falcons announced that Kotwica was hired as their new special teams coordinator on January 9, 2019. Kotwica was fired on October 12, 2020.

=== Minnesota Vikings ===
On February 23, 2022, Kotwica was hired by the Minnesota Vikings to serve as the team's assistant special teams coach for the 2022 season.

=== Denver Broncos ===
On February 25, 2023, Kotwica was hired by the Denver Broncos as their special teams coordinator under head coach Sean Payton. Kotwica was fired on January 17, 2025.

=== Los Angeles Rams ===
On February 24, 2025, Kotwica was announced as joining the Rams staff as an assistant special teams coach for head coach Sean McVay. After special teams coach Chase Blackburn was dismissed following the Rams' 38–37 overtime loss to the Seattle Seahawks, Kotwica was elevated to the role of interim special teams coach.

=== Baltimore Ravens ===
On February 11, 2026 it was reported that Kotwica was joining the Baltimore Ravens as a senior special teams assistant on head coach Jesse Minter's inaugural staff.
