= 2024 Los Angeles Rams season =

88th season in franchise history

- Owner: Stan Kroenke
- General manager: Les Snead
- Head coach: Sean McVay
- Offensive coordinator: Mike LaFleur
- Defensive coordinator: Chris Shula
- Home stadium: SoFi Stadium

Results
- Record: 10–7
- Division place: 1st NFC West
- Playoffs: Won Wild Card Playoffs (vs. Vikings) 27–9; Lost Divisional Playoffs (at Eagles) 22–28
- Pro Bowlers: OLB Jared Verse

Uniform
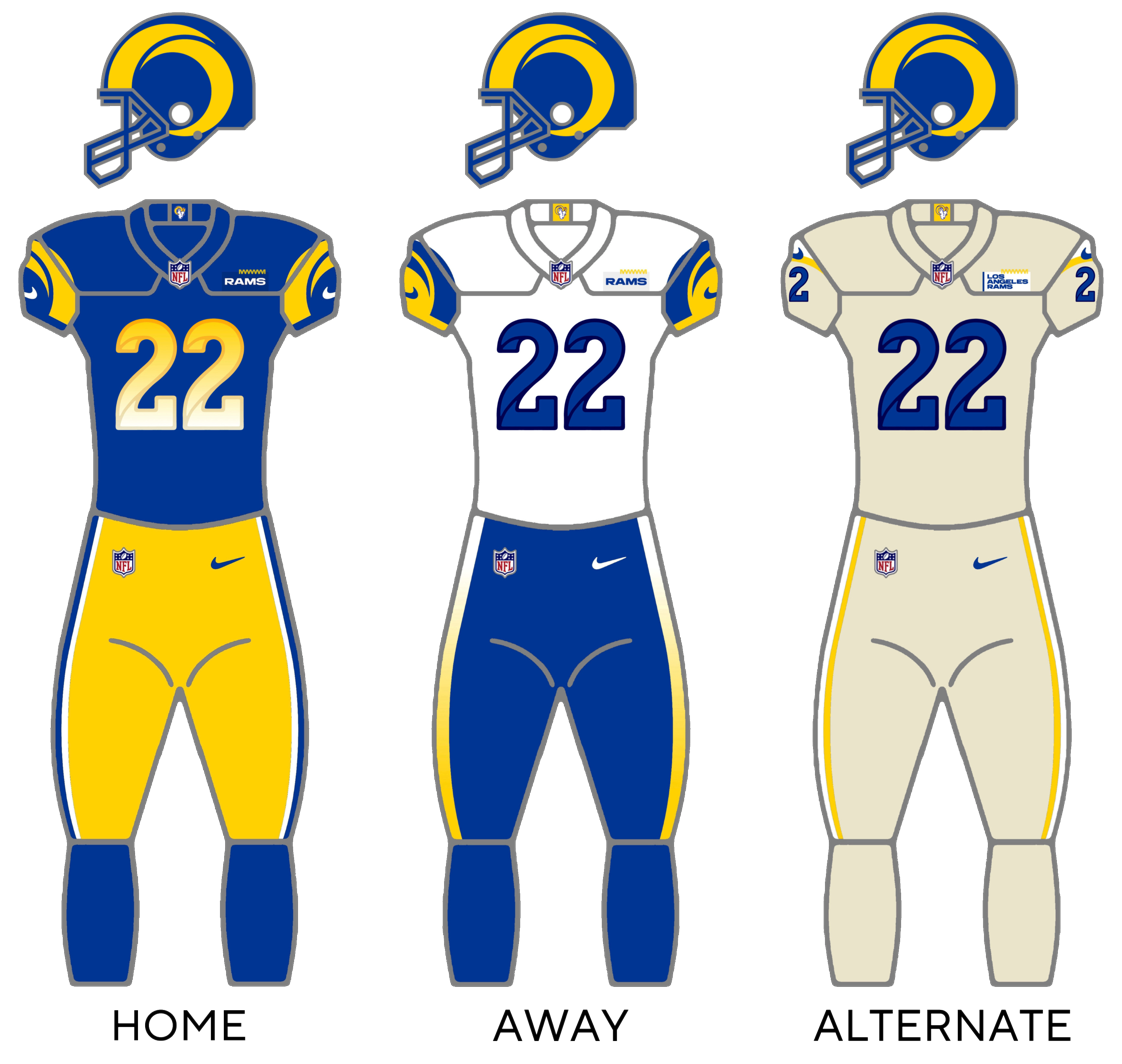

The 2024 season was the Los Angeles Rams' 87th in the National Football League (NFL), their 88th overall, 58th in the Greater Los Angeles Area, fifth playing their home games at SoFi Stadium and eighth under head coach Sean McVay. This was their first season since 2013 without Aaron Donald on the roster, as he announced his retirement on March 15. The Rams matched their 10–7 record from the previous season, and advanced in the playoffs after being defeated in the Wild Card Round against the Detroit Lions in 2023. They defeated the No. 5 seed rival Minnesota Vikings in a dominant win by a score of 27–9. In the Divisional Round, however, they fell short against the eventual Super Bowl champion Philadelphia Eagles, losing by a score of 28–22 to end their season. It was the Rams' sixth playoff appearance in eight seasons.

Similarly to the previous two seasons, the Rams began their season poorly with a 1–4 record, with numerous injuries to key players such as Puka Nacua contributing heavily to the poor start. After the bye week, the Rams won nine out of their twelve final games, with their strong defense and the return of key offensive players anchoring the surge. The Rams also earned the NFC West Division title for the first time since their 2021 Super Bowl-winning season, finishing tied with the Seattle Seahawks, but winning the strength-of-victory tiebreaker over the Seahawks.

The 2024 Rams, like the 2023 Rams, made the playoffs after starting 1–4, three games below .500. In doing so, the Rams became the first franchise in NFL history to accomplish such a feat in consecutive seasons.

== Offseason ==
=== Coaching changes ===
- Eric Henderson, who had served as defensive line coach and run game coordinator, departed the Rams to join the USC Trojans football staff to serve as co-defensive coordinator, run game coordinator, and defensive line coach.
- Raheem Morris, the Rams' defensive coordinator since 2021, was hired by the Atlanta Falcons as head coach. He is the sixth former Rams assistant to be hired as a head coach after serving on Sean McVay's staff.
- Zac Robinson, who had spent the previous five seasons on the Rams' coaching staff in various positions, most recently as pass game coordinator/quarterbacks coach, followed Raheem Morris to the Atlanta Falcons to become the team's new offensive coordinator.
- Jimmy Lake, the Rams' assistant head coach in 2023, joined Morris in Atlanta to serve as defensive coordinator.
- Jeremy Springer, a special teams assistant for the Rams the previous two seasons, was hired by the New England Patriots as special teams coordinator.
- Chris Shula, who served in a variety of roles on the Rams coaching staff for the previous seven seasons as an assistant, most recently as pass rush coordinator & linebackers coach in 2023, was elevated to defensive coordinator, succeeding Raheem Morris.
- Giff Smith, most recently the interim head coach of the Los Angeles Chargers, was hired by the Rams to take on dual responsibilities as defensive line coach and run game coordinator, succeeding Eric Henderson in both roles.
- The Rams hired Chili Davis, former Kansas State Wildcats special teams quality control coach and a veteran college assistant, to serve as assistant special teams coach. However, the team parted ways with Davis prior to the season.
- Jake Peetz, who had spent the previous two seasons as an offensive assistant with the Rams (including last season as pass game specialist), was hired by the Seattle Seahawks as their new pass game coordinator.
- John Streicher, previously the director of football administration with the Tennessee Titans, joined the Rams staff with a new title of coordinator of football strategy.
- Dave Ragone, who had served as offensive coordinator with the Atlanta Falcons for the last three seasons, was hired as the Rams quarterback coach. The Rams also brought on board Nathan Scheelhaase, a longtime offensive assistant at Iowa State, as pass game specialist. Both positions had been previously held by Zac Robinson.
- Greg Williams joined the Rams coaching staff as inside linebackers coach.
- Sean Desai, previously a defensive coordinator for the Chicago Bears and the Philadelphia Eagles, was hired by the Rams as a senior defensive assistant.
- On March 8, 2024, the Rams announced they had hired Jerry Schuplinski to serve as a senior offensive assistant.
- On September 2, 2024, the Rams announced the hiring of former Nebraska and UCF head coach Scott Frost as a senior football analyst, helping with offense, defense, and special teams. On December 7, Frost left the team to return to UCF for a second time as head coach.

=== Training camp/practice training facility ===
After holding training camp for the first time at Loyola Marymount University in Los Angeles, the Rams conducted the remainder of preseason practices at Cal Lutheran University in Thousand Oaks, where the team had operated its training facility since 2016 when the franchise relocated from St. Louis. This was necessitated due to delays in the construction of a new temporary facility at the Kroenke Warner Center complex in Woodland Hills. Following the end of the preseason, the Rams began conducting practices at their new permanent facility.

=== Draft ===
2024 Los Angeles Rams draft selections
Round	Selection	Player	Position	College	Notes
1	19	Jared Verse	DE	Florida State	
2	39	Braden Fiske	DT	Florida State	From Giants via Panthers (Note: The Rams traded second- and fifth-round selections (52nd and 155th overall), and a 2025 second-round selection to the Carolina Panthers in exchange for a second-round selection (39th overall).)
2	52	Traded to the Carolina Panthers			
3	83	Blake Corum	RB	Michigan	
3	99	Kamren Kinchens	S	Miami (FL)	2020 Resolution JC-2A selection (Note: The Rams received a third-round selection (99th overall) and a 2025 third-round selection after the Atlanta Falcons hired former Rams DC Raheem Morris as head coach.)
4	120	Traded to the Pittsburgh Steelers (Note: The Rams traded a fourth-round selection (120th overall) and a 2025 fifth-round selection to the Pittsburgh Steelers in exchange for a fifth-round selection (155th overall), a 2025 sixth-round selection and G Kevin Dotson.)			
5	154	Brennan Jackson	DE	Washington State	
5	155	Traded to the Carolina Panthers			From Steelers
6	189	Traded to the Buffalo Bills (Note: The Rams traded a sixth-round selection (189th overall) and a 2023 seventh-round selection (252nd overall) to Buffalo in exchange for a 2023 sixth-round selection (215th overall).)			From Broncos (Note: The Rams traded a seventh-round selection (239th overall) and LB Kenny Young to the Denver Broncos in exchange for a sixth-round selection (189th overall).)
6	196	Tyler Davis	DT	Clemson	
6	209	Joshua Karty	K	Stanford	
6	213	Jordan Whittington	WR	Texas	
6	217	Beaux Limmer	C	Arkansas	
7	239	Traded to the Denver Broncos			
7	254	KT Leveston	OT	Kansas State	

Draft trades

2024 Los Angeles Rams undrafted free agents
Name	Position	College	Ref.
Justin Dedich	C	USC	
Anthony Goodlow	DE	Oklahoma State	
Neal Johnson	TE	Louisiana	
J. J. Laap	WR	Cortland	
Cam Lampkin	CB	Washington State	
Blake Larson	OT	Augustana (SD)	
Tuli Letuligasenoa	DT	Washington	
Kenny Logan Jr.	S	Kansas	
Jaylen McCollough	S	Tennessee	
Elias Neal	LB	Marshall	
David Olajiga	DT	Central Missouri	
Omar Speights	LB	LSU	
Drake Stoops	WR	Oklahoma	
Josh Wallace	CB	Michigan	
Sam Wiglusz	WR	Ohio	
Charles Woods	CB	SMU	

2024 Los Angeles Rams Reserve/Future signees
Name	Position	College	Ref.
AJ Arcuri	OT	Michigan State	
Tanner Brown	K	Oklahoma State	
Logan Bruss	G	Wisconsin	
Cory Durden	DT	NC State	
Olakunle Fatukasi	LB	Rutgers	
Miller Forristall	TE	Alabama	
Tanner Ingle	S	NC State	
Nikola Kalinic	TE	York	
Mike McAllister	C	Youngstown State	
Cameron McCutcheon	CB	Western Carolina	
Grant Miller	G	Baylor	
Xavier Smith	WR	Florida A&M	
Zachary Thomas	T	San Diego State	
Zach VanValkenburg	LB	Iowa	
Dresser Winn	QB	UT Martin	

== Staff ==
2024 Los Angeles Rams staff
Front office: Owner/CEO – Stan Kroenke; President – Kevin Demoff; General manager – Les Snead; Vice president of football and business administration – Tony Pastoors; Director of football operations – Sophie Harlan; Senior personnel executives – Brian Xanders, Ray Farmer; Director of scouting strategy – James Gladstone; Director of pro scouting – John McKay; Director of player engagement – Jacques McClendon; Head coaches: Head coach – Sean McVay; Assistant head coach/pass game coordinator – Aubrey Pleasant; Offensive coaches: Offensive coordinator – Mike LaFleur; Quarterbacks – Dave Ragone; Running backs – Ron Gould; Wide receivers – Eric Yarber; Tight ends/pass game coordinator – Nick Caley; Offensive line – Ryan Wendell; Assistant offensive line – Zak Kromer; Senior offensive assistant – Jerry Schuplinski; Offensive assistant – Rob Calabrese; Offensive assistant/pass game specialist – Nathan Scheelhaase	Defensive coaches: Defensive coordinator – Chris Shula; Defensive line/run game coordinator – Giff Smith; Assistant defensive line – A.C. Carter; Outside linebackers – Joe Coniglio; Inside linebackers – Greg Williams; Safeties – Chris Beake; Senior defensive assistant – Sean Desai; Defensive assistant – Mike Harris; Special teams coaches: Special teams coordinator – Chase Blackburn; Senior football analyst – Scott Frost; Game management coordinator – John Streicher; Strength and conditioning: Director of strength training and performance – Justin Lovett; Assistant strength and conditioning – Dustin Woods

== Final roster ==
2024 Los Angeles Rams roster
Quarterbacks (QB): 13 Stetson Bennett; 11 Jimmy Garoppolo; 9 Matthew Stafford; Running backs (RB): 20 Ronnie Rivers; 32 Cody Schrader; 23 Kyren Williams; Wide receivers (WR): 5 Tutu Atwell; 18 Tyler Johnson; 10 Cooper Kupp; 17 Puka Nacua; 15 Demarcus Robinson; 19 Xavier Smith; 88 Jordan Whittington; Tight ends (TE): 87 Davis Allen; 89 Tyler Higbee; 84 Hunter Long; 86 Colby Parkinson	Offensive linemen (OL): 73 Steve Avila LG; 67 Justin Dedich LG; 69 Kevin Dotson RG; 79 Rob Havenstein RT; 77 Alaric Jackson LT; 72 Jonah Jackson C; 50 Beaux Limmer C; 71 Warren McClendon RT; 63 Dylan McMahon RG; 70 Joe Noteboom RT; Defensive linemen (DL): 95 Bobby Brown III NT; 90 Tyler Davis DE; 55 Braden Fiske DE; 92 Neville Gallimore NT; 94 Desjuan Johnson DE; 91 Kobie Turner DE	Linebackers (LB): 97 Michael Hoecht OLB; 35 Jake Hummel ILB; 44 Brennan Jackson OLB; 56 Christian Rozeboom ILB; 48 Omar Speights ILB; 8 Jared Verse OLB; 0 Byron Young OLB; Defensive backs (DB): 3 Kamren Curl SS; 14 Cobie Durant CB; 25 Emmanuel Forbes CB; 43 John Johnson SS; 26 Kamren Kinchens FS; 37 Quentin Lake FS; 39 Jaylen McCollough SS; 30 Josh Wallace CB; 24 Darious Williams CB; 4 Ahkello Witherspoon CB; Special teams (ST): 42 Ethan Evans P; 16 Joshua Karty K; 47 Alex Ward LS	Practice squad: 61 A. J. Arcuri LT; 2 Quintez Cephus WR; 40 Tony Fields II ILB; 36 Royce Freeman RB; 27 A. J. Green CB; 93 Jack Heflin DE; 34 Tanner Ingle SS; 38 Shaun Jolly CB; 83 Nikola Kalinic TE; 33 Cam Lampkin CB; 58 Elias Neal ILB; 65 David Olajiga DE (IPP); 6 Drake Stoops WR; 98 Kevin Strong DE; 96 Keir Thomas OLB; 45 Rashad Weaver OLB; 21 Charles Woods CB; Reserve: 22 Blake Corum RB (IR); 31 Nick Hampton OLB (IR); 1 Derion Kendrick CB (IR); 66 KT Leveston G (IR); 64 Conor McDermott RT (IR); 52 Larrell Murchison DE (IR); 51 Troy Reeder ILB (IR); 6 Tre Tomlinson CB (IR); Rookies in italics 53 active, 8 reserve, 16 practice squad (1 exempt)

== Preseason ==
The Rams' preseason opponents and preliminary schedule was announced on May 15, in conjunction with the release of the regular season schedule.

Week	Date	Opponent	Result	Record	Venue	Sources
1	August 11	Dallas Cowboys	W 13–12	1–0	SoFi Stadium	Recap
2	August 17	at Los Angeles Chargers	W 13–9	2–0	SoFi Stadium	Recap
3	August 24	at Houston Texans	L 15–17	2–1	NRG Stadium	Recap

For the Rams' exhibition matchup against the Chargers, assistant head coach/pass game coordinator Aubrey Pleasant served as head coach, calling plays and making decisions from the sideline while Sean McVay watched the game from the coach's booth.

== Regular season ==
=== Schedule ===
Week	Date	Opponent	Result	Record	Venue	Sources
1	September 8	at Detroit Lions	**L** 20–26 (OT)	0–1	Ford Field	Recap
2	September 15	at **Arizona Cardinals**	**L** 10–41	0–2	State Farm Stadium	Recap
3	September 22	**San Francisco 49ers**	**W** 27–24	1–2	SoFi Stadium	Recap
4	September 29	at Chicago Bears	**L** 18–24	1–3	Soldier Field	Recap
5	October 6	Green Bay Packers	**L** 19–24	1–4	SoFi Stadium	Recap
6	Bye					
7	October 20	Las Vegas Raiders	**W** 20–15	2–4	SoFi Stadium	Recap
8	October 24	Minnesota Vikings	**W** 30–20	3–4	SoFi Stadium	Recap
9	November 3	at **Seattle Seahawks**	**W** 26–20 (OT)	4–4	Lumen Field	Recap
10	November 11	Miami Dolphins	**L** 15–23	4–5	SoFi Stadium	Recap
11	November 17	at New England Patriots	**W** 28–22	5–5	Gillette Stadium	Recap
12	November 24	Philadelphia Eagles	**L** 20–37	5–6	SoFi Stadium	Recap
13	December 1	at New Orleans Saints	**W** 21–14	6–6	Caesars Superdome	Recap
14	December 8	Buffalo Bills	**W** 44–42	7–6	SoFi Stadium	Recap
15	December 12	at **San Francisco 49ers**	**W** 12–6	8–6	Levi's Stadium	Recap
16	December 22	at New York Jets	**W** 19–9	9–6	MetLife Stadium	Recap
17	December 28	**Arizona Cardinals**	**W** 13–9	10–6	SoFi Stadium	Recap
18	January 5	**Seattle Seahawks**	**L** 25–30	10–7	SoFi Stadium	Recap

Note: Intra-division opponents are in bold text.

=== Game summaries ===
==== Week 1: at Detroit Lions ====
Week 1: Los Angeles Rams at Detroit Lions – Game summary

Quarter	1	2	3	4	OT	Total
Rams	3	0	7	10	0	**20**
**Lions**	0	10	7	3	6	**26**

at Ford Field, Detroit, Michigan

- Date: September 8
- Game time: 8:20 p.m. EDT/5:20 p.m. PDT
- Game weather: None (indoor stadium)
- Game attendance: 66,530
- Referee: Adrian Hill
- TV announcers (NBC): Mike Tirico, Cris Collinsworth and Melissa Stark
- Recap, Game Book

Game information

**First quarter**

- LAR – Joshua Karty 41-yard field goal, 4:50. Rams 3–0. **Drive: 13 plays, 67 yards, 6:30.**

**Second quarter**

- DET – Jake Bates 25-yard field goal, 12:17. Tied 3–3. **Drive: 15 plays, 63 yards, 7:33.**
- DET – Jahmyr Gibbs 1-yard run (Jake Bates kick), 1:57. Lions 10–3. **Drive: 9 plays, 77 yards, 4:34.**

**Third quarter**

- DET – Jameson Williams 52-yard pass from Jared Goff (Jake Bates kick), 10:29. Lions 17–3. **Drive: 3 plays, 59 yards, 1:32.**
- LAR – Kyren Williams 2-yard run (Joshua Karty kick), 3:33. Lions 17–10. **Drive: 11 plays, 70 yards, 6:56.**

**Fourth quarter**

- LAR – Joshua Karty 26-yard field goal, 12:32. Lions 17–13. **Drive: 7 plays, 76 yards, 3:59.**
- LAR – Cooper Kupp 9-yard pass from Matthew Stafford (Joshua Karty kick), 4:30. Rams 20–17. **Drive: 10 plays, 80 yards, 4:39.**
- DET – Jake Bates 32-yard field goal, 0:17. Tied 20–20. **Drive: 9 plays, 55 yards, 1:54.**

**Overtime**

- DET – David Montgomery 1-yard run, 5:19. Lions 26–20. **Drive: 8 plays, 70 yards, 4:41.**

**Top passers**

- LAR – Matthew Stafford – 34/49, 317 yards, TD, INT
- DET – Jared Goff – 18/28, 217 yards, TD, INT

**Top rushers**

- LAR – Kyren Williams – 18 rushes, 50 yards, TD
- DET – David Montgomery – 17 rushes, 91 yards, TD

**Top receivers**

- LAR – Cooper Kupp – 14 receptions, 110 yards, TD
- DET – Jameson Williams – 5 receptions, 121 yards, TD

In a rematch of a 2023 Wild Card Round game, the Rams overcame a rash of injuries to rally for a 20–17 lead late in the fourth quarter before falling to the host Lions in overtime on Sunday Night Football at Ford Field. Wide receiver Cooper Kupp tied a single game career-high with 14 receptions for 110 yards, including a 9-yard touchdown from quarterback Matthew Stafford with 4:30 remaining that put Los Angeles in the lead for the first time on the night. Stafford completed 34 of 49 passes for 317 yards while wide receiver Tyler Johnson caught five passes for 79 yards. However, second-year wide receiver Puka Nacua left the game in the second quarter after catching four passes for 35 yards and did not return. Offensively, running back Kyren Williams had 18 carries for 50 yards with a 1-yard TD run but the Rams offensive line, already down two starters prior to the game, lost two more when left guard Steve Avila and left tackle Joe Noteboom were both injured and knocked out of the game. On defense, Rams safety Quentin Lake led the Rams with 10 tackles while fellow safety John Johnson had an interception. Linebackers Byron Young and Jared Verse (a rookie) each had four tackles and a sack in the loss.

==== Week 2: at Arizona Cardinals ====
Week 2: Los Angeles Rams at Arizona Cardinals – Game summary

Quarter	1	2	3	4	Total
Rams	0	3	7	0	**10**
**Cardinals**	14	10	10	7	**41**

at State Farm Stadium, Glendale, Arizona

- Date: September 15
- Game time: 1:05 p.m. MST & PDT
- Game weather: None (retractable roof closed)
- Game attendance: 63,331
- Referee: John Hussey
- TV announcers (Fox): Adam Amin, Mark Sanchez and Kristina Pink
- Recap, Game Book

Game information

**First quarter**

- ARI – Marvin Harrison Jr. 23-yard pass from Kyler Murray (Matt Prater kick), 11:03. Cardinals 7–0. **Drive: 6 plays, 60 yards, 2:27.**
- ARI – Marvin Harrison Jr. 60-yard pass from Kyler Murray (Matt Prater kick), 8:47. Cardinals 14–0. **Drive: 1 play, 60 yards, 0:10.**

**Second quarter**

- ARI – Elijah Higgins 18-yard pass from Kyler Murray (Matt Prater kick), 13:29. Cardinals 21–0. **Drive: 13 plays, 99 yards, 8:31.**
- LAR – Joshua Karty 29-yard field goal, 9:38. Cardinals 21–3. **Drive: 7 plays, 59 yards, 3:51.**
- ARI – Matt Prater 48-yard field goal, 5:09. Cardinals 24–3. **Drive: 7 plays, 40 yards, 4:29.**

**Third quarter**

- ARI – James Conner 5-yard run (Matt Prater kick), 10:33. Cardinals 31–3. **Drive: 8 plays, 70 yards, 4:27.**
- ARI – Matt Prater 57-yard field goal, 3:26. Cardinals 34–3. **Drive: 9 plays, 43 yards, 5:13.**
- LAR – Kyren Williams 4-yard run (Joshua Karty kick), 0:41. Cardinals 34–10. **Drive: 8 plays, 70 yards, 2:46.**

**Fourth quarter**

- ARI – Trey McBride fumble recovery in the end zone (Matt Prater kick), 9:02. Cardinals 41–10. **Drive: 11 plays, 70 yards, 6:39.**

**Top passers**

- LAR – Matthew Stafford – 19/27, 216 yards
- ARI – Kyler Murray – 17/21, 266 yards, 3 TD

**Top rushers**

- LAR – Blake Corum – 8 rushes, 28 yards
- ARI – James Conner – 21 rushes, 122 yards, TD

**Top receivers**

- LAR – Demarcus Robinson – 2 receptions, 50 yards
- ARI – Marvin Harrison Jr. – 4 receptions, 130 yards, 2 TD

Los Angeles fell to 0–2 for the first time in the Sean McVay era (and first time since 2011 when the franchise was based in St. Louis) as the host Cardinals scored touchdowns on their first three offensive possessions on the way to a 24–3 halftime lead. Arizona got its first win over the Rams franchise at State Farm Stadium since 2014, a streak that reached nine games. Cardinals rookie wide receiver Marvin Harrison Jr. caught four passes for 130 yards and scored twice in the first period, while his quarterback Kyler Murray completed 17 of 21 passes for 266 yards and three touchdowns and a perfect passer rating while also scoring on a 4-yard TD run in the third period. Rams quarterback Matthew Stafford completed 19 of 27 passes for 216 yards but was sacked five times as Los Angeles never recovered from the big early deficit. Running back Kyren Williams (nine carries, 28 yards) scored L.A.'s only touchdown on a 4-yard run in the third quarter as the Rams were held to just 53 rushing yards. Linebacker Jared Verse had seven tackles and forced a fumble that was recovered by fellow rookie defensive tackle Braden Fiske for the Rams.

==== Week 3: vs. San Francisco 49ers ====
Week 3: San Francisco 49ers at Los Angeles Rams – Game summary

Quarter	1	2	3	4	Total
49ers	14	0	7	3	**24**
**Rams**	0	7	7	13	**27**

at SoFi Stadium, Inglewood, California

- Date: September 22
- Game time: 1:25 p.m. PDT
- Game weather: Sunny, 75 °F (24 °C) (fixed roof)
- Game attendance: 74,484
- Referee: Clete Blakeman
- TV announcers (Fox): Adam Amin, Mark Sanchez and Kristina Pink
- Recap, Game Book

Game information

**First quarter**

- SF – Jauan Jennings 13-yard pass from Brock Purdy (Jake Moody kick), 11:12. 49ers 7–0. **Drive: 8 plays, 70 yards, 3:48.**
- SF – Jauan Jennings 4-yard pass from Brock Purdy (Jake Moody kick), 1:47. 49ers 14–0. **Drive: 13 plays, 77 yards, 7:53.**

**Second quarter**

- LAR – Kyren Williams 15-yard pass from Matthew Stafford (Joshua Karty kick), 1:11. 49ers 14–7. **Drive: 16 plays, 87 yards, 7:44.**

**Third quarter**

- SF – Jauan Jennings 31-yard pass from Brock Purdy (Jake Moody kick), 7:01. 49ers 21–7. **Drive: 11 plays, 91 yards, 6:27.**
- LAR – Kyren Williams 3-yard run (Joshua Karty kick), 3:53. 49ers 21–14. **Drive: 6 plays, 70 yards, 3:08.**

**Fourth quarter**

- SF – Jake Moody 26-yard field goal, 11:57. 49ers 24–14. **Drive: 13 plays, 62 yards, 6:56.**
- LAR – Joshua Karty 33-yard field goal, 6:15. 49ers 24–17. **Drive: 13 plays, 55 yards, 5:42.**
- LAR – Kyren Williams 4-yard run (Joshua Karty kick), 1:51. Tied 24–24. **Drive: 3 plays, 55 yards, 0:52.**
- LAR – Joshua Karty 37-yard field goal, 0:02. Rams 27–24. **Drive: 2 plays, 31 yards, 0:40.**

**Top passers**

- SF – Brock Purdy – 22/30, 292 yards, 3 TD
- LAR – Matthew Stafford – 16/26, 221 yards, TD

**Top rushers**

- SF – Jordan Mason – 19 rushes, 77 yards
- LAR – Kyren Williams – 24 rushes, 89 yards, 2 TD

**Top receivers**

- SF – Jauan Jennings – 11 receptions, 175 yards, 3 TD
- LAR – Tutu Atwell – 4 receptions, 93 yards

Down by 10 midway through the fourth quarter, the Rams rallied for three unanswered scores, the last coming with rookie kicker Joshua Karty converting a 37-yard field goal with two seconds remaining to secure L.A.'s first victory of the season. The home-opening win was also the Rams' first-ever regular season victory over the rival 49ers at SoFi Stadium after losses in the previous four seasons (not including L.A.'s victory over San Francisco in the 2021 NFC Championship Game) and their first home regular season win over the 49ers since 2018. Rams running back Kyren Williams ran for 89 yards and two touchdowns on 24 carries and caught two passes for 27 yards, one of which was a 15-yard touchdown reception in which Williams somersaulted over 49er strong safety Talanoa Hufanga at the goal line in the second quarter for L.A.'s first points. Quarterback Matthew Stafford completed 16 of 26 passes for 221 yards and earned the 36th fourth quarter comeback win of his career. Wide receiver Tutu Atwell had four receptions for 93 yards for the Rams, including a 50-yard catch with under three minutes remaining that set up Williams' game tying score. Free safety Quentin Lake and linebackers Troy Reeder and Christian Rozeboom had 10 total tackles each to share the lead for the Rams, who avoided their worst start since 2011 when the team opened with six straight losses.

==== Week 4: at Chicago Bears ====
Week 4: Los Angeles Rams at Chicago Bears – Game summary

Quarter	1	2	3	4	Total
Rams	3	3	3	9	**18**
**Bears**	0	10	7	7	**24**

at Soldier Field, Chicago, Illinois

- Date: September 29
- Game time: 12:00 p.m. CDT/10:00 a.m. PDT
- Game weather: Mostly cloudy, 70 °F (21 °C)
- Game attendance: 59,074
- Referee: Brad Rogers
- TV announcers (Fox): Adam Amin, Mark Sanchez and Kristina Pink
- Recap, Game Book

Game information

**First quarter**

- LAR – Joshua Karty 46-yard field goal, 4:01. Rams 3–0. **Drive: 13 plays, 68 yards, 7:23.**

**Second quarter**

- LAR – Joshua Karty 37-yard field goal, 13:05. Rams 6–0. **Drive: 8 plays, 56 yards, 3:51.**
- CHI – Roschon Johnson 1-yard run (Cairo Santos kick), 5:42. Bears 7–6. **Drive: 3 plays, 16 yards, 1:00.**
- CHI – Cairo Santos 40-yard field goal, 0:09. Bears 10–6. **Drive: 8 plays, 45 yards, 0:52.**

**Third quarter**

- LAR – Joshua Karty 25-yard field goal, 8:50. Bears 10–9. **Drive: 12 plays, 63 yards, 6:10.**
- CHI – D. J. Moore 9-yard pass from Caleb Williams (Cairo Santos kick), 2:43. Bears 17–9. **Drive: 12 plays, 74 yards, 6:13.**

**Fourth quarter**

- LAR – Kyren Williams 3-yard run (pass failed), 14:55. Bears 17–15. **Drive: 6 plays, 70 yards, 2:42.**
- CHI – D'Andre Swift 36-yard run (Cairo Santos kick), 12:26. Bears 24–15. **Drive: 5 plays, 70 yards, 2:29.**
- LAR – Joshua Karty 52-yard field goal, 8:47. Bears 24–18. **Drive: 7 plays, 36 yards, 3:39.**

**Top passers**

- LAR – Matthew Stafford – 20/29, 224 yards, INT
- CHI – Caleb Williams – 17/23, 157 yards, TD

**Top rushers**

- LAR – Kyren Williams – 19 rushes, 94 yards, TD
- CHI – D'Andre Swift – 16 rushes, 93 yards, TD

**Top receivers**

- LAR – Tutu Atwell – 4 receptions, 82 yards
- CHI – D'Andre Swift – 7 receptions, 72 yards

The Rams fell to 1–3 in a defensive battle at Soldier Field, where the franchise last won in 2003. Los Angeles took a 6–0 lead on a pair of field goals (46, 37) by rookie kicker Joshua Karty, but the host Bears went ahead in the second quarter after a strip sack of quarterback Matthew Stafford led to a 1-yard touchdown run by Chicago running back Roschon Johnson. Karty converted two more field goals (25, 52) in the second half, converting four of five attempts on the day. Running back Kyren Williams had 94 yards on 19 carries with a 1-yard touchdown run in the fourth quarter. Stafford completed 20 of 29 passes for 224 yards but was sacked three times and threw an interception on L.A.'s final possession. Wide receivers Tutu Atwell (four receptions, 82 yards) and Jordan Whittington (six receptions, 62 yards) also contributed to the Rams' offensive effort. Defensively, linebacker Christian Rozeboom led the Rams with 11 total tackles while rookie defensive tackle Braden Fiske earned his first career sack, one of three by L.A.'s defense on Bears rookie quarterback Caleb Williams.

==== Week 5: vs. Green Bay Packers ====
Week 5: Green Bay Packers at Los Angeles Rams – Game summary

Quarter	1	2	3	4	Total
**Packers**	7	3	14	0	**24**
Rams	0	13	0	6	**19**

at SoFi Stadium, Inglewood, California

- Date: October 6
- Game time: 1:25 p.m. PDT
- Game weather: Sunny, 73 °F (23 °C) (fixed roof)
- Game attendance: 72,842
- Referee: Brad Allen
- TV announcers (CBS): Jim Nantz, Tony Romo and Tracy Wolfson
- Recap, Game Book

Game information

**First quarter**

- GB – Josh Jacobs 2-yard run (Brayden Narveson kick), 6:52. Packers 7–0. **Drive: 9 plays, 96 yards, 5:05.**

**Second quarter**

- LAR – Kyren Williams 1-yard run (Joshua Karty kick), 9:47. Tied 7–7. **Drive: 13 plays, 55 yards, 7:10.**
- LAR – Jaylen McCollough 4-yard interception return (kick blocked), 2:02. Rams 13–7.
- GB – Brayden Narveson 46-yard field goal, 0:00. Rams 13–10. **Drive: 9 plays, 42 yards, 2:02.**

**Third quarter**

- GB – Tucker Kraft 66-yard pass from Jordan Love (Brayden Narveson kick), 11:15. Packers 17–13. **Drive: 2 plays, 70 yards, 0:43.**
- GB – Tucker Kraft 7-yard pass from Jordan Love (Brayden Narveson kick), 4:00. Packers 24–13. **Drive: 7 plays, 54 yards, 4:06.**

**Fourth quarter**

- LAR – Demarcus Robinson 1-yard pass from Matthew Stafford (run failed), 3:30. Packers 24–19. **Drive: 11 plays, 91 yards, 2:32.**

**Top passers**

- GB – Jordan Love – 15/26, 224 yards, 2 TD, INT
- LAR – Matthew Stafford – 29/45, 260 yards, TD, INT

**Top rushers**

- GB – Josh Jacobs – 19 rushes, 73 yards, TD
- LAR – Kyren Williams – 22 rushes, 102 yards, TD

**Top receivers**

- GB – Tucker Kraft – 4 receptions, 88 yards, 2 TD
- LAR – Jordan Whittington – 7 receptions, 89 yards

Kyren Williams ran for 102 yards and a touchdown, but a pair of turnovers allowed the visiting Packers to take the lead and a late comeback attempt fell short as the Rams fell to 1–4. With the game tied at 7–7, the Rams took the lead when linebacker Byron Young hit Green Bay quarterback Jordan Love in the end zone. As he fell down, Love attempted to throw his pass away to avoid a safety, but the ball was intercepted at the Packer 4 by rookie defensive back Jaylen McCollough and returned for a touchdown. Williams scored on a 1-yard run midway through the second quarter (his eighth straight regular season game with a rushing TD), but his fumble in Packers territory on L.A.'s opening drive of the third quarter led directly to a Green Bay touchdown. Quarterback Matthew Stafford then threw an interception that the Packers capitalized on with another touchdown to take a 24–13 lead. Stafford completed 29 of 45 passes for 260 yards on the day and rallied the Rams in the fourth quarter with a 1-yard touchdown pass to wide receiver Demarcus Robinson to close the score to within 24–19. After the L.A. defense forced Green Bay to punt with just under three minutes left, Stafford guided the Rams across midfield but a sack and an incomplete pass ended L.A.'s final drive at the Packer 38 with 1:03 remaining. Rookie wide receiver Jordan Whittington caught a team-high seven passes for 89 yards while defensive end Kobie Turner had two sacks on the day while sharing the team lead in tackles (five) with safety Quentin Lake.

==== Week 7: vs. Las Vegas Raiders ====
Week 7: Las Vegas Raiders at Los Angeles Rams – Game summary

Quarter	1	2	3	4	Total
Raiders	0	6	3	6	**15**
**Rams**	0	14	6	0	**20**

at SoFi Stadium, Inglewood, California

- Date: October 20
- Game time: 1:05 p.m. PDT
- Game weather: Sunny, 80 °F (27 °C) (fixed roof)
- Game attendance: 73,267
- Referee: Shawn Hochuli
- TV announcers (CBS): Kevin Harlan, Trent Green and Melanie Collins
- Recap, Game Book

Game information

**First quarter**

- No scoring plays.

**Second quarter**

- LV – Daniel Carlson 38-yard field goal, 14:04. Raiders 3–0. **Drive: 9 plays, 56 yards, 3:29.**
- LAR – Kyren Williams 13-yard run (Joshua Karty kick), 3:00. Rams 7–3. **Drive: 4 plays, 47 yards, 1:47.**
- LAR – Kamren Curl 33-yard fumble return (Joshua Karty kick), 1:14. Rams 14–3. **Drive: 5 plays, 3 yards, 1:46.**
- LV – Daniel Carlson 47-yard field goal, 0:00. Rams 14–6. **Drive: 8 plays, 41 yards, 1:14.**

**Third quarter**

- LAR – Kyren Williams 2-yard run (kick failed, wide right), 7:30. Rams 20–6. **Drive: 8 plays, 41 yards, 1:14.**
- LV – Daniel Carlson 38-yard field goal, 2:25. Rams 20–9. **Drive: 10 plays, 50 yards, 5:05.**

**Fourth quarter**

- LV – Daniel Carlson 27-yard field goal, 14:52. Rams 20–12. **Drive: 4 plays, 5 yards, 1:14.**
- LV – Daniel Carlson 27-yard field goal, 2:46. Rams 20–15. **Drive: 15 plays, 66 yards, 7:25.**

**Top passers**

- LV – Gardner Minshew – 15/34, 154 yards, 3 INT
- LAR – Matthew Stafford – 14/23, 154 yards, INT

**Top rushers**

- LV – Alexander Mattison – 23 rushes, 92 yards
- LAR – Kyren Williams – 21 rushes, 76 yards, 2 TD

**Top receivers**

- LV – Brock Bowers – 10 receptions, 93 yards
- LAR – Tyler Johnson – 4 receptions, 57 yards

Coming off the bye week, a strong defensive effort kept the visiting Raiders out of the end zone as the Rams got their second victory of the season. Strong safety Kamren Curl recovered a fumble and returned it 33 yards for a touchdown to build a 14–6 lead for Los Angeles. Following a scoreless first quarter, Las Vegas took its only lead of the game on the first of five field goals by kicker Daniel Carlson. Rams running back Kyren Williams put the Rams ahead with a 13-yard touchdown run with three minutes remaining in the second period, the score being set up by an interception by cornerback Cobie Durant. On the Raiders' next possession, Durant sacked Las Vegas quarterback Gardner Minshew and forced a fumble which was picked up by Curl who took it back for a TD. Durant was named NFC Defensive Player of the Week for his performance in the game. Williams (21 carries, 76 yards) scored his second touchdown of the game on a 2-yard run midway through the third quarter, with this opportunity set up by rookie safety Jaylen McCollough's interception of a Minshew pass. McCollough intercepted a second pass with under 90 seconds remaining to seal the Rams' victory. Inside linebacker Troy Reeder and free safety Quentin Lake shared the team lead in tackles with nine each.

==== Week 8: vs. Minnesota Vikings ====
Week 8: Minnesota Vikings at Los Angeles Rams – Game summary

Quarter	1	2	3	4	Total
Vikings	14	0	3	3	**20**
**Rams**	7	7	7	9	**30**

at SoFi Stadium, Inglewood, California

- Date: October 24
- Game time: 5:15 p.m. PDT
- Game weather: Sunny, 66 °F (19 °C) (fixed roof)
- Game attendance: 72,127
- Referee: Tra Blake
- TV announcers (KTTV/Prime Video): Al Michaels, Kirk Herbstreit and Kaylee Hartung
  Game exclusive to KTTV through syndication. Out of market on Prime Video.
- Recap, Game Book

Game information

**First quarter**

- MIN – Josh Oliver 5-yard pass from Sam Darnold (Will Reichard kick), 10:43. Vikings 7–0. **Drive: 8 plays, 70 yards, 4:17.**
- LAR – Kyren Williams 5-yard pass from Matthew Stafford (Joshua Karty kick), 6:38. Tied 7–7. **Drive: 9 plays, 70 yards, 4:05.**
- MIN – Trent Sherfield 10-yard pass from Sam Darnold (Will Reichard kick), 0:53. Vikings 14–7. **Drive: 10 plays, 70 yards, 5:45.**

**Second quarter**

- LAR – Cooper Kupp 7-yard pass from Matthew Stafford (Joshua Karty kick), 10:05. Tied 14–14. **Drive: 10 plays, 70 yards, 5:48.**

**Third quarter**

- MIN – Will Reichard 23-yard field goal, 6:22. Vikings 17–14. **Drive: 11 plays, 68 yards, 5:46.**
- LAR – Demarcus Robinson 25-yard pass from Matthew Stafford (Joshua Karty kick), 2:36. Rams 21–17. **Drive: 8 plays, 70 yards, 3:46.**

**Fourth quarter**

- MIN – Will Reichard 35-yard field goal, 12:47. Rams 21–20. **Drive: 9 plays, 53 yards, 4:49.**
- LAR – Demarcus Robinson 10-yard pass from Matthew Stafford (Joshua Karty kick), 6:17. Rams 28–20. **Drive: 10 plays, 70 yards, 6:30.**
- LAR – Sam Darnold sacked in the end zone for a safety, 1:36. Rams 30–20.

**Top passers**

- MIN – Sam Darnold – 18/25, 240 yards, 2 TD
- LAR – Matthew Stafford – 25/34, 279 yards, 4 TD, INT

**Top rushers**

- MIN – Aaron Jones – 19 rushes, 58 yards
- LAR – Kyren Williams – 23 rushes, 97 yards

**Top receivers**

- MIN – Justin Jefferson – 8 receptions, 115 yards
- LAR – Puka Nacua – 7 receptions, 106 yards

The host Rams claimed their second victory in five days, pulling away from the Vikings in the second half to improve to 3–4 on the season. Quarterback Matthew Stafford had his strongest game of the season with 279 passing yards and four touchdown passes. Bolstered by the return of previously injured wide receivers Puka Nacua and Cooper Kupp, Los Angeles matched Minnesota touchdown for touchdown in the first half, which ended with a 14–14 score. Stafford's first TD pass came on a 5-yard pass play over the middle to running back Kyren Williams in the opening period, while the second came early in the second quarter as Stafford ducked under a ferocious Vikings pass rush before firing a pass to a sliding Kupp in the back of the end zone to tie the game. Stafford, who completed 25 of 34 passes and was not sacked, found wide receiver Demarcus Robinson for touchdowns in the third and fourth quarters. Williams added 97 rushing yards on 23 carries while scoring a TD for the 14th straight game, while Nacua made his first start since the season opener and caught seven passes for 106 yards. Defensively, the Rams held Minnesota to just a pair of field goals in the second half and sacked Vikings quarterback Sam Darnold three times, the last coming when linebacker Byron Young corralled Darnold in the end zone with 1:36 remaining in the game to seal the victory.

==== Week 9: at Seattle Seahawks ====
Week 9: Los Angeles Rams at Seattle Seahawks – Game summary

Quarter	1	2	3	4	OT	Total
**Rams**	0	3	10	7	6	**26**
Seahawks	0	13	0	7	0	**20**

at Lumen Field, Seattle, Washington

- Date: November 3
- Game time: 1:25 p.m. PST
- Game weather: Cloudy, 52 °F (11 °C)
- Game attendance: 68,632
- Referee: Clay Martin
- TV announcers (Fox): Kenny Albert, Jonathan Vilma and Megan Olivi
- Recap, Game Book

Game information

**First quarter**

- No scoring plays.

**Second quarter**

- LAR – Joshua Karty 38-yard field goal, 3:31. Rams 3–0. **Drive: 11 plays, 43 yards, 5:54.**
- SEA – Tyler Lockett 30-yard pass from Geno Smith (kick blocked), 0:51. Seahawks 6–3. **Drive: 9 plays, 70 yards, 2:40.**
- SEA – Jaxon Smith-Njigba 24-yard pass from Geno Smith (Jason Myers kick), 0:05. Seahawks 13–3. **Drive: 3 plays, 60 yards, 0:22.**

**Third quarter**

- LAR – Demarcus Robinson 1-yard pass from Matthew Stafford (Joshua Karty kick), 8:28. Seahawks 13–10. **Drive: 11 plays, 75 yards, 6:32.**
- LAR – Joshua Karty 21-yard field goal, 0:27. Tied 13–13. **Drive: 12 plays, 62 yards, 5:39.**

**Fourth quarter**

- LAR – Kamren Kinchens 103-yard interception return (Joshua Karty kick), 10:59. Rams 20–13.
- SEA – Jaxon Smith-Njigba 14-yard pass from Geno Smith (Jason Myers kick), 0:51. Tied 20–20. **Drive: 8 plays, 73 yards, 1:03.**

**Overtime**

- LAR – Demarcus Robinson 39-yard pass from Matthew Stafford, 4:57. Rams 26–20. **Drive: 4 plays, 83 yards, 2:22.**

**Top passers**

- LAR – Matthew Stafford – 25/44, 298 yards, 2 TD, INT
- SEA – Geno Smith – 21/34, 363 yards, 3 TD, 3 INT

**Top rushers**

- LAR – Kyren Williams – 22 rushes, 69 yards
- SEA – Kenneth Walker III – 25 rushes, 83 yards

**Top receivers**

- LAR – Cooper Kupp – 11 receptions, 104 yards
- SEA – Jaxon Smith-Njigba – 7 receptions, 180 yards, 2 TD

Quarterback Matthew Stafford's 39-yard touchdown pass to wide receiver Demarcus Robinson with 4:57 remaining in overtime gave Los Angeles the victory in a wild NFC West battle at Lumen Field. Following a scoreless first quarter, the Rams took a 3–0 lead on a 38-yard field goal by rookie kicker Joshua Karty but host Seattle rallied to take a 13–3 halftime lead with two touchdown passes by quarterback Geno Smith. Robinson and Stafford connected on a 1-yard touchdown pass to finish off an 11-play, 75-yard drive to start the second half, while Karty converted a second field goal from 21 yards out to tie the score at 13–13. The Rams retook the lead when rookie free safety Kamren Kinchens intercepted Smith in the end zone and returned it 103 yards for a touchdown and a 20–13 Rams advantage. The interception return was the longest in Rams franchise history, breaking the previous record shared by Johnnie Johnson (1980 vs. Green Bay) and Janoris Jenkins (2014 vs. San Diego). Host Seattle rallied to tie the score in the final minute of regulation, then (after winning the coin toss) drove 56 yards in six plays to set up a fourth-and-1 at the L.A. 16. But Seahawks running back Kenneth Walker III was swarmed by the Rams defense for no gain, forcing a turnover on downs. After driving the team 44 yards in three plays to set up second-and-6 at the Seahawks 39, Stafford rolled out to his left and lofted a deep pass to the end zone, where Robinson beat the coverage of Seattle cornerback Riq Woolen and gathered in the game-winning touchdown reception with one hand. Robinson caught a season-high six receptions for 94 yards and two TDs while fellow wide receiver Cooper Kupp caught 11 passes for 104 yards and Stafford completed 25 of 44 passes for 298 yards. Defensively, Kinchens had three tackles and a fumble recovery along with another interception in the fourth quarter that thwarted a Seahawks scoring opportunity, and was named NFC Defensive Player of the Week. Rookie defensive tackle Braden Fiske had two sacks while linebacker Christian Rozeboom led L.A. with 11 total tackles and the Rams collected seven total sacks as they evened their season record to 4–4.

==== Week 10: vs. Miami Dolphins ====
Week 10: Miami Dolphins at Los Angeles Rams – Game summary

Quarter	1	2	3	4	Total
**Dolphins**	7	3	7	6	**23**
Rams	0	6	0	9	**15**

at SoFi Stadium, Inglewood, California

- Date: November 11
- Game time: 5:15 p.m. PST
- Game weather: Clear, 60 °F (16 °C) (fixed roof)
- Game attendance: 72,474
- Referee: Ronald Torbert
- TV announcers (KCOP): Joe Buck, Troy Aikman and Lisa Salters
  Game exclusive to KCOP through syndication. Out of market on ESPN, blacked out in Los Angeles and Miami.
- Recap, Game Book

Game information

**First quarter**

- MIA – Malik Washington 18-yard run (Jason Sanders kick), 12:01. Dolphins 7–0. **Drive: 5 plays, 70 yards, 2:59.**

**Second quarter**

- MIA – Jason Sanders 50-yard field goal, 14:07. Dolphins 10–0. **Drive: 5 plays, 22 yards, 1:54.**
- LAR – Joshua Karty 34-yard field goal, 5:46. Dolphins 10–3. **Drive: 6 plays, 20 yards, 1:51.**
- LAR – Joshua Karty 55-yard field goal, 0:00. Dolphins 10–6. **Drive: 11 plays, 54 yards, 2:13.**

**Third quarter**

- MIA – Tyreek Hill 1-yard pass from Tua Tagovailoa (Jason Sanders kick), 5:32. Dolphins 17–6. **Drive: 6 plays, 53 yards, 3:39.**

**Fourth quarter**

- LAR – Joshua Karty 53-yard field goal, 14:55. Dolphins 17–9. **Drive: 11 plays, 39 yards, 5:37.**
- MIA – Jason Sanders 37-yard field goal, 9:07. Dolphins 20–9. **Drive: 11 plays, 51 yards, 5:48.**
- LAR – Joshua Karty 22-yard field goal, 6:31. Dolphins 20–12. **Drive: 8 plays, 66 yards, 2:36.**
- MIA – Jason Sanders 50-yard field goal, 2:38. Dolphins 23–12. **Drive: 8 plays, 39 yards, 3:53.**
- LAR – Joshua Karty 31-yard field goal, 0:39. Dolphins 23–15. **Drive: 12 plays, 58 yards, 1:59.**

**Top passers**

- MIA – Tua Tagovailoa – 20/28, 207 yard, TD, INT
- LAR – Matthew Stafford – 32/46, 293 yards, INT

**Top rushers**

- MIA – De'Von Achane – 12 rushes, 37 yards
- LAR – Kyren Williams – 15 rushes, 62 yards

**Top receivers**

- MIA – Jaylen Waddle – 3 receptions, 57 yards
- LAR – Puka Nacua – 9 receptions, 98 yards

The Rams sputtered offensively and were held out of the end zone by the visiting Dolphins on Monday Night Football to end a three-game winning streak. Rookie kicker Joshua Karty converted five of six field goal attempts (two in the second quarter, three in the fourth) to account for L.A.'s scoring, but Miami took the lead on the game's opening drive and never lost their advantage. Quarterback Matthew Stafford completed 32 of 46 passes for 293 yards with an interception, while wide receiver Puka Nacua had nine receptions for 98 yards. Rookie inside linebacker Omar Speights recorded a team-high eight tackles while fellow rookie outside linebacker Jared Verse added four total tackles including a sack and a forced fumble.

==== Week 11: at New England Patriots ====
Week 11: Los Angeles Rams at New England Patriots – Game summary

Quarter	1	2	3	4	Total
**Rams**	0	14	14	0	**28**
Patriots	7	3	3	9	**22**

at Gillette Stadium, Foxborough, Massachusetts

- Date: November 17
- Game time: 1:00 p.m. EST/10:00 a.m. PST
- Game weather: Sunny, 59 °F (15 °C)
- Game attendance: 64,628
- Referee: Shawn Smith
- TV announcers (Fox): Adam Amin, Mark Sanchez and Kristina Pink
- Recap, Game Book

Game information

**First quarter**

- NE – Kendrick Bourne 9-yard pass from Drake Maye (Joey Slye kick), 5:05. Patriots 7–0. **Drive: 7 plays, 77 yards, 3:34.**

**Second quarter**

- LAR – Cooper Kupp 5-yard pass from Matthew Stafford (Joshua Karty kick), 7:18. Tied 7–7. **Drive: 9 plays, 80 yards, 5:05.**
- LAR – Puka Nacua 12-yard pass from Matthew Stafford (Joshua Karty kick), 5:45. Rams 14–7. **Drive: 1 play, 12 yards, 0:04.**
- NE – Joey Slye 32-yard field goal, 1:52. Rams 14–10. **Drive: 9 plays, 57 yards, 3:53.**

**Third quarter**

- LAR – Cooper Kupp 69-yard pass from Matthew Stafford (Joshua Karty kick), 14:10. Rams 21–10. **Drive: 2 plays, 70 yards, 0:50.**
- NE – Joey Slye 25-yard field goal, 7:02. Rams 21–13. **Drive: 13 plays, 63 yards, 7:08.**
- LAR – Colby Parkinson 19-yard pass from Matthew Stafford (Joshua Karty kick), 3:30. Rams 28–13. **Drive: 7 plays, 72 yards, 3:32.**

**Fourth quarter**

- NE – Vederian Lowe 4-yard pass from Drake Maye (kick blocked), 12:45. Rams 28–19. **Drive: 10 plays, 70 yards, 5:45.**
- NE – Joey Slye 42-yard field goal, 4:54. Rams 28–22. **Drive: 13 plays, 66 yards, 6:09.**

**Top passers**

- LAR – Matthew Stafford – 18/27, 295 yards, 4 TD
- NE – Drake Maye – 30/40, 282 yards, 2 TD, INT

**Top rushers**

- LAR – Kyren Williams – 15 rushes, 86 yards
- NE – Rhamondre Stevenson – 20 rushes, 73 yards

**Top receivers**

- LAR – Puka Nacua – 7 receptions, 123 yards, TD
- NE – Kendrick Bourne – 5 receptions, 70 yards, TD

Quarterback Matthew Stafford threw four touchdown passes as the Rams overcame another slow start to put away the host Patriots and improve to 5–5 on the season. Wide receivers Cooper Kupp (six receptions, 106 yards) and Puka Nacua (seven receptions, 123 yards) both caught TDs from Stafford in the second quarter as the Rams took a 14–10 halftime lead. Kupp caught a 69-yard scoring pass from Stafford on the second play of the third period, while tight end Colby Parkinson scored on a 19-yard TD later in the quarter. Running back Kyren Williams added 86 rushing yards on 15 carries while the Rams committed no turnovers and did not give up a sack on offense. Safety Quentin Lake and linebacker Christian Rozeboom shared the team lead in total tackles with 11 each, while rookie defensive tackle Braden Fiske had two of L.A.'s three sacks along with a forced fumble. Rookie safety Kamren Kinchens was named NFC Defensive Player of the Week for the second time in three weeks after recording eight tackles, an interception and a forced fumble.

==== Week 12: vs. Philadelphia Eagles ====
Week 12: Philadelphia Eagles at Los Angeles Rams – Game summary

Quarter	1	2	3	4	Total
**Eagles**	3	10	14	10	**37**
Rams	7	0	7	6	**20**

at SoFi Stadium, Inglewood, California

- Date: November 24
- Game time: 5:20 p.m. PST
- Game weather: Clear, 57 °F (14 °C) (fixed roof)
- Game attendance: 74,400
- Referee: Land Clark
- TV announcers (NBC): Mike Tirico, Cris Collinsworth and Melissa Stark
- Recap, Game Book

Game information

**First quarter**

- PHI – Jake Elliott 21-yard field goal, 5:13. Eagles 3–0. **Drive: 12 plays, 80 yards, 7:19.**
- LAR – Kyren Williams 1-yard run (Joshua Karty kick), 1:02. Rams 7–3. **Drive: 9 plays, 70 yards, 4:11.**

**Second quarter**

- PHI – Jake Elliott 31-yard field goal, 6:17. Rams 7–6. **Drive: 10 plays, 51 yards, 5:23.**
- PHI – A. J. Brown 6-yard pass from Jalen Hurts (Jake Elliott kick), 1:27. Eagles 13–7. **Drive: 10 plays, 62 yards, 2:46.**

**Third quarter**

- PHI – Saquon Barkley 70-yard run (Jake Elliott kick), 14:49. Eagles 20–7. **Drive: 1 play, 70 yards, 0:11.**
- LAR – Demarcus Robinson 2-yard pass from Matthew Stafford (Joshua Karty kick), 10:51. Eagles 20–14. **Drive: 8 plays, 70 yards, 3:58.**
- PHI – Kenneth Gainwell 13-yard run (Jake Elliott kick), 6:17. Eagles 27–14. **Drive: 8 plays, 70 yards, 4:34.**

**Fourth quarter**

- PHI – Jake Elliott 26-yard field goal, 10:30. Eagles 30–14. **Drive: 12 plays, 55 yards, 6:02.**
- PHI – Saquon Barkley 72-yard run (Jake Elliott kick), 2:44. Eagles 37–14. **Drive: 6 plays, 91 yards, 2:29.**
- LAR – Cooper Kupp 27-yard pass from Matthew Stafford (pass failed), 1:07. Eagles 37–20. **Drive: 8 plays, 68 yards, 1:37.**

**Top passers**

- PHI – Jalen Hurts – 15/22, 179 yards, TD
- LAR – Matthew Stafford – 24/36, 243 yards, 2 TD

**Top rushers**

- PHI – Saquon Barkley – 26 rushes, 255 yards, 2 TD
- LAR – Kyren Williams – 16 rushes, 72 yards, TD

**Top receivers**

- PHI – A. J. Brown – 6 receptions, 109 yards, TD
- LAR – Puka Nacua – 9 receptions, 117 yards

The visiting Eagles broke open a close game in the second half and claimed their sixth straight road win against the Rams franchise dating back to 2004. Los Angeles took the opening kickoff and drove 53 yards in five plays down to the Philadelphia 17 when running back Kyren Williams fumbled the ball. After the Eagles converted the turnover into a field goal, Los Angeles rebounded with a 70-yard drive in nine plays capped off by a 1-yard TD run by Williams. But the Eagles took control of the game, outscoring the Rams 34–7 as running back Saquon Barkley ran for a career-high 255 yards, including touchdown runs of 70 and 72 yards in the second half on the way to victory. Matthew Stafford threw for 243 yards and touchdown passes to Demarcus Robinson and Cooper Kupp, while wide receiver Puka Nacua led the team with nine receptions for 117 yards, and Williams had 16 carries for 72 yards on the ground. Linebacker Christian Rozeboom led the Rams in tackles with 12, while defensive tackle Braden Fiske had two tackles for loss, including a sack.

==== Week 13: at New Orleans Saints ====
Week 13: Los Angeles Rams at New Orleans Saints – Game summary

Quarter	1	2	3	4	Total
**Rams**	0	0	7	14	**21**
Saints	3	3	0	8	**14**

at Caesars Superdome, New Orleans, Louisiana

- Date: December 1
- Game time: 3:05 p.m. CST/1:05 p.m. PST
- Game weather: None (indoor stadium)
- Game attendance: 70,006
- Referee: Brad Allen
- TV announcers (Fox): Kenny Albert, Jonathan Vilma and Megan Olivi
- Recap, Game Book

Game information

**First quarter**

- NO – Blake Grupe 54-yard field goal, 8:48. Saints 3–0. **Drive: 12 plays, 34 yards, 6:12.**

**Second quarter**

- NO – Blake Grupe 54-yard field goal, 0:02. Saints 6–0. **Drive: 11 plays, 51 yards, 1:48.**

**Third quarter**

- LAR – Kyren Williams 4-yard run (Joshua Karty kick), 8:50. Rams 7–6. **Drive: 11 plays, 70 yards, 6:10.**

**Fourth quarter**

- LAR – Demarcus Robinson 3-yard pass from Matthew Stafford (Joshua Karty kick), 14:57. Rams 14–6. **Drive: 4 plays, 82 yards, 2:06.**
- NO – Marquez Valdes-Scantling 28-yard pass from Derek Carr (Derek Carr–Dante Pettis pass), 11:53. Tied 14–14. **Drive: 6 plays, 70 yards, 3:04.**
- LAR – Puka Nacua 7-yard pass from Matthew Stafford (Joshua Karty kick), 8:54. Rams 21–14. **Drive: 8 plays, 56 yards, 2:59.**

**Top passers**

- LAR – Matthew Stafford – 14/24, 183 yards, 2 TD
- NO – Derek Carr – 24/37, 184 yards, TD

**Top rushers**

- LAR – Kyren Williams – 15 rushes, 104 yards, TD
- NO – Alvin Kamara – 23 rushes, 112 yards

**Top receivers**

- LAR – Puka Nacua – 5 receptions, 56 yards, TD
- NO – Taysom Hill – 5 receptions, 37 yards

Despite being shut out in the first half for the first time in the regular season as head coach, Sean McVay guided his team back with a strong performance in the final two periods to again even the Rams' record to .500 (6–6). In the process, McVay became the Rams' all-time winningest head coach during the regular season with his 76th victory, surpassing John Robinson, who coached the Rams from 1983 to 1991 (McVay had surpassed Robinson for overall team victories in the Rams' Week 8 victory against Minnesota). Though New Orleans ran 40 plays to L.A.'s 23 and dominated time of possession (18:41 to 11:19), the Rams defense held strong and limited the Saints to only a pair of field goals. Running back Kyren Williams ran the ball seven times for 37 yards on L.A.'s opening drive of the third quarter, a 10-play, 70-yard march that ended with Williams scoring on a 4-yard run. Williams finished the day with 104 yards on 15 carries. Quarterback Matthew Stafford found wide receiver Demarcus Robinson on a deep route for a 46-yard gain on the final player of the third quarter, then on the first play of the fourth period, Stafford and Robinson connected again for a 3-yard TD pass. After the Saints tied the score on their next possession, the Rams answered as Jordan Whittington's 43-yard kickoff return to near midfield would ultimately lead to Stafford's second touchdown pass of the day, a 7-yard strike to wide receiver Puka Nacua, who had a team-high five receptions for 56 yards. With just under nine minutes remaining in the game, the Saints mounted a 14-play, 61-yard drive that reached to the Rams 9-yard line. On fourth-and-3, defensive end Jared Verse forced New Orleans quarterback Derek Carr into an incomplete pass with 1:09 remaining, and L.A. was able to run out the clock. Inside linebackers Christian Rozeboom (12) and Omar Speights (10) were the team's leading tacklers, while Verse was credited with five tackles along with three quarterback pressures.

==== Week 14: vs. Buffalo Bills ====
Week 14: Buffalo Bills at Los Angeles Rams – Game summary

Quarter	1	2	3	4	Total
Bills	7	7	7	21	**42**
**Rams**	7	17	14	6	**44**

at SoFi Stadium, Inglewood, California

- Date: December 8
- Game time: 1:25 p.m. PST
- Game weather: Sunny, 68 °F (20 °C) (fixed roof)
- Game attendance: 73,493
- Referee: Craig Wrolstad
- TV announcers (Fox): Kevin Burkhardt, Tom Brady, Erin Andrews and Tom Rinaldi
- Recap, Game Book

Game information

**First quarter**

- LAR – Kyren Williams 3-yard run (Joshua Karty kick), 8:26. Rams 7–0. **Drive: 12 plays, 70 yards, 6:34.**
- BUF – Josh Allen 1-yard run (Tyler Bass kick), 3:22. Tied 7–7. **Drive: 9 plays, 70 yards, 5:04.**

**Second quarter**

- LAR – Joshua Karty 22-yard field goal, 13:37. Rams 10–7. **Drive: 10 plays, 65 yards, 4:45.**
- LAR – Hunter Long 22-yard return of blocked punt (Joshua Karty kick), 12:29. Rams 17–7.
- BUF – Ty Johnson 41-yard pass from Josh Allen (Tyler Bass kick), 10:23. Rams 17–14. **Drive: 4 plays, 70 yards, 2:06.**
- LAR – Puka Nacua 4-yard run (Joshua Karty kick), 2:36. Rams 24–14. **Drive: 12 plays, 76 yards, 7:47.**

**Third quarter**

- LAR – Kyren Williams 7-yard run (Joshua Karty kick), 8:26. Rams 31–14. **Drive: 11 plays, 76 yards, 5:29.**
- BUF – Khalil Shakir 51-yard pass from Josh Allen (Tyler Bass kick), 3:54. Rams 31–21. **Drive: 6 plays, 80 yards, 4:32.**
- LAR – Cooper Kupp 17-yard pass from Matthew Stafford (Joshua Karty kick), 0:18. Rams 38–21. **Drive: 7 plays, 70 yards, 3:36.**

**Fourth quarter**

- BUF – Josh Allen 1-yard run (Tyler Bass kick), 14:27. Rams 38–28. **Drive: 5 plays, 70 yards, 0:51.**
- BUF – Mack Hollins 21-yard pass from Josh Allen (Tyler Bass kick), 8:49. Rams 38–35. **Drive: 10 plays, 91 yards, 4:03.**
- LAR – Puka Nacua 19-yard pass from Matthew Stafford (kick failed, wide left), 1:54. Rams 44–35. **Drive: 11 plays, 71 yards, 6:55.**
- BUF – Josh Allen 1-yard run (Tyler Bass kick), 1:00. Rams 44–42. **Drive: 8 plays, 70 yards, 0:54.**

**Top passers**

- BUF – Josh Allen – 22/37, 342 yards, 3 TD
- LAR – Matthew Stafford – 23/30, 320 yards, 2 TD

**Top rushers**

- BUF – Josh Allen – 10 rushes, 82 yards, 3 TD
- LAR – Kyren Williams – 29 rushes, 87 yards, 2 TD

**Top receivers**

- BUF – Khalil Shakir – 5 receptions, 106 yards, TD
- LAR – Puka Nacua – 12 receptions, 162 yards, TD

Wide receiver Puka Nacua caught 12 passes for 162 yards and his 19-yard catch-and-run midway through the fourth quarter proved to be the winning points as the host Rams held off the visiting Bills to go above .500 for the first time in the season while ending Buffalo's seven-game winning streak. Los Angeles never trailed and grabbed the early lead by taking the opening kickoff and marching 70 yards in 12 plays, the last one being a 3-yard scoring run by running back Kyren Williams. After Buffalo tied the game on a 1-yard TD run by quarterback Josh Allen, the Rams responded with a 22-yard field goal by kicker Joshua Karty early in the second quarter and a 10–7 lead. Forcing Buffalo to punt, the kick attempt was blocked by Jake Hummel and the ball was then picked up by Hunter Long who returned it 22 yards for a touchdown. Nacua, who carried the ball a career-high five times for 16 yards, scored on a 4-yard run off a jet sweep late in the second quarter to finish off an 86-yard drive as the Rams took a 24–14 halftime lead. Los Angeles kept up its momentum in the second half with another 86-yard drive that ended with a 7-yard TD run by Williams (29 attempts, 87 yards), who surpassed 1,000 rushing yards for the second straight season. L.A. scored on its next drive with quarterback Matthew Stafford finding wide receiver Cooper Kupp over the middle for a diving TD catch over two Bills defenders to put the Rams up 38–21. But Allen led the Bills back with a TD pass and a TD run to close to within 38–35. Stafford, who completed 23 of 30 passes for 320 yards in the game, went six-for-seven for 66 yards on the drive, and got the final 19 by hitting Nacua on a short hook pass. Then, picking up a key block from Kupp, Nacua accelerated toward the end zone for the clinching score with 1:54 remaining. Though the Rams defense gave up one more touchdown run to Allen (who became the first person in NFL history to run for three TDs and pass for three TDs in the same game) with 1:02 remaining, a key play was made one snap earlier when Allen was stopped on his first attempt at a quarterback sneak from the 1-yard line on first-and-goal by linebacker Omar Speights. The stop forced Buffalo to use one of its timeouts, and after the ball was recovered during the onside kick attempt by Ronnie Rivers, L.A. was able to run down the clock until just seven seconds were left. On fourth-and-7 from the Bills 42, Rams punter Ethan Evans got away his final kick which landed in the end zone as time ran out. The win was head coach Sean McVay's first over Buffalo after two previous losses in 2020 and 2022, and was the first home victory by the Rams franchise against the Bills since 1983.

==== Week 15: at San Francisco 49ers ====
Week 15: Los Angeles Rams at San Francisco 49ers – Game summary

Quarter	1	2	3	4	Total
**Rams**	0	3	0	9	**12**
49ers	3	0	3	0	**6**

at Levi's Stadium, Santa Clara, California

- Date: December 12
- Game time: 5:15 p.m. PST
- Game weather: Rain, 53 °F (12 °C)
- Game attendance: 71,201
- Referee: Clay Martin
- TV announcers (KTTV/Prime Video): Al Michaels, Kirk Herbstreit and Kaylee Hartung
  Game exclusive to KTTV through syndication. Out of market on Prime Video.
- Recap, Game Book

Game information

**First quarter**

- SF – Jake Moody 53-yard field goal, 10:01. 49ers 3–0. **Drive: 5 plays, 39 yards, 2:47.**

**Second quarter**

- LAR – Joshua Karty 48-yard field goal, 1:05. Tied 3–3. **Drive: 7 plays, 20 yards, 3:47.**

**Third quarter**

- SF – Jake Moody 47-yard field goal, 8:23. 49ers 6–3. **Drive: 10 plays, 34 yards, 4:49.**

**Fourth quarter**

- LAR – Joshua Karty 23-yard field goal, 13:38. Tied 6–6. **Drive: 17 plays, 65 yards, 9:45.**
- LAR – Joshua Karty 27-yard field goal, 9:28. Rams 9–6. **Drive: 5 plays, 59 yards, 3:00.**
- LAR – Joshua Karty 29-yard field goal, 0:18. Rams 12–6. **Drive: 13 plays, 69 yards, 4:56.**

**Top passers**

- LAR – Matthew Stafford – 16/27, 160 yards
- SF – Brock Purdy – 14/31, 142 yards, INT

**Top rushers**

- LAR – Kyren Williams – 29 rushes, 108 yards
- SF – Isaac Guerendo – 16 rushes, 57 yards

**Top receivers**

- LAR – Puka Nacua – 7 receptions, 97 yards
- SF – George Kittle – 4 receptions, 61 yards

Rookie kicker Joshua Karty converted four field goal attempts, including three in the fourth quarter as the Rams prevailed in a tough defensive battle at Levi's Stadium to earn their first sweep of their NFC West rivals since the 2018 season. Playing four days after scoring 44 points, Los Angeles sputtered offensively in the first quarter, punting four times with no first downs and only 23 yards. San Francisco took an early lead with a 53-yard field goal by kicker Jake Moody, but the Rams defense held the 49ers to just 20 rushing yards in the first half and a sack by defensive tackle Kobie Turner forced a punt. Taking over at midfield, the Rams were led by running back Kyren Williams who had four carries for 13 yards down to the 49er 30 to set up Karty's first field goal attempt, which was successful from 48 yards out. Following a second field goal by Moody in the third quarter, the Rams answered with a 16-play drive that pushed all the way to the San Francisco 2-yard line, but penalties stalled the effort and Karty tied the score with a 23-yard field goal. After the defense held the 49ers to a three-and-out, Los Angeles struck back as quarterback Matthew Stafford came up with the biggest offensive play of the night with a 52-yard deep pass to wide receiver Puka Nacua that led to Karty's third field goal, a 27-yard attempt that gave L.A. its first lead. Cornerback Darious Williams intercepted a Brock Purdy pass in the end zone with 5:14 remaining in the game, which led to the Rams closing out the game with a 13-play, 69-yard drive that ended with a fourth Karty field goal from 29 yards out. Kyren Williams totaled 29 carries for 108 hard-earned rushing yards while Nacua had seven receptions for 97 yards. Linebacker Christian Rozeboom had nine total tackles including a sack while defensive tackle Turner had two sacks in the game, which was L.A.'s seventh victory in the last nine weeks since entering the bye week with a 1–4 record. Nacua had seven receptions for 97 yards to lead the Rams' offense.

==== Week 16: at New York Jets ====
Week 16: Los Angeles Rams at New York Jets – Game summary

Quarter	1	2	3	4	Total
**Rams**	0	6	0	13	**19**
Jets	6	3	0	0	**9**

at MetLife Stadium, East Rutherford, New Jersey

- Date: December 22
- Game time: 1:00 p.m. EST/10:00 a.m. PST
- Game weather: Sunny, 23 °F (−5 °C)
- Game attendance: 76,871
- Referee: Ronald Torbert
- TV announcers (CBS): Kevin Harlan, Trent Green and Melanie Collins
- Recap, Game Book

Game information

**First quarter**

- NYJ – Davante Adams 11-yard pass from Aaron Rodgers (kick failed, wide left), 0:23. Jets 6–0. **Drive: 14 plays, 99 yards, 8:22.**

**Second quarter**

- LAR – Kyren Williams 2-yard run (kick failed, hit right upright), 6:22. Tied 6–6. **Drive: 3 plays, 33 yards, 1:34.**
- NYJ – Anders Carlson 21-yard field goal, 0:00. Jets 9–6. **Drive: 15 plays, 67 yards, 6:22.**

**Third quarter**

- No scoring plays.

**Fourth quarter**

- LAR – Joshua Karty 38-yard field goal, 12:44. Tied 9–9. **Drive: 13 plays, 66 yards, 7:31.**
- LAR – Tyler Higbee 11-yard pass from Matthew Stafford (Joshua Karty kick), 10:11. Rams 16–9. **Drive: 3 plays, 21 yards, 1:32.**
- LAR – Joshua Karty 45-yard field goal, 5:17. Rams 19–9. **Drive: 6 plays, 19 yards, 3:06.**

**Top passers**

- LAR – Matthew Stafford – 14/19, 110 yards, TD, INT
- NYJ – Aaron Rodgers – 28/42, 256 yards, TD

**Top rushers**

- LAR – Kyren Williams – 23 rushes, 122 yards, TD
- NYJ – Breece Hall – 14 rushes, 52 yards

**Top receivers**

- LAR – Puka Nacua – 8 receptions, 56 yards
- NYJ – Davante Adams – 7 receptions, 68 yards, TD

With key defensive stops and a methodical approach on offense, the Rams clinched a winning season for the seventh time in eight seasons under head coach Sean McVay, who got his first-ever victory against the Jets. Running back Kyren Williams powered his way to 122 rushing yards on 23 carries and scored on a 2-yard run midway through the second quarter to tie the score at 6–6. Host New York drove 67 yards in 15 plays to the Rams' 3-yard line late in the second quarter, but L.A.'s defense held the Jets to a field goal. New York again mounted a long drive that covered 78 yards in 14 plays and consumed 9 minutes, 45 seconds to start the third quarter, but the Rams defense again stiffened and forced the Jets to turn over the ball on downs at the L.A. 13. The Rams responded with a 13-play, 59-yard possession that ended with a 38-yard field goal by kicker Joshua Karty early in the fourth quarter. On the next drive, Jets quarterback Aaron Rodgers was sacked on a corner blitz by Kamren Curl who forced a fumble that was recovered by linebacker Jared Verse at the New York 21. After two runs by Williams moved the ball to the Jets 11, quarterback Matthew Stafford found Tyler Higbee open on a delay route, and the veteran tight end (seeing his first action of the season after recovering from a torn ACL) dived into the end zone for touchdown and a 16–9 Rams lead. Karty added another field goal on L.A.'s next possession and with less than two minutes remaining, Jordan Whittington recovered a muffed punt return by the Jets and the Rams were able to run out the clock. Rookie strong safety Jaylen McCollough led the Rams in tackles with nine while linebacker Christian Rozeboom had eight. Offensively, Stafford completed 14 of 19 passes for 110 yards with a touchdown and an interception, but was not sacked for the third straight game, while wide receiver Puka Nacua led the team in receiving with eight receptions for 56 yards.

==== Week 17: vs. Arizona Cardinals ====
Week 17: Arizona Cardinals at Los Angeles Rams – Game summary

Quarter	1	2	3	4	Total
Cardinals	0	0	6	3	**9**
**Rams**	0	10	0	3	**13**

at SoFi Stadium, Inglewood, California

- Date: December 28
- Game time: 5:00 p.m. PST
- Game weather: Cloudy, 57 °F (14 °C) (fixed roof)
- Game attendance: 73,051
- Referee: Brad Rogers
- TV announcers (KCBS/KPNX): Rich Eisen, Kurt Warner and Jamie Erdahl
  Game exclusive to KCBS and KPNX through syndication. Out of market on the NFL Network, which is blacked out in Los Angeles and Phoenix.
- Recap, Game Book

Game information

**First quarter**

- No scoring plays.

**Second quarter**

- LAR – Kyren Williams 1-yard run (Joshua Karty kick), 3:23. Rams 7–0. **Drive: 9 plays, 60 yards, 3:12.**
- LAR – Joshua Karty 53-yard field goal, 0:27. Rams 10–0. **Drive: 8 plays, 42 yards, 1:14.**

**Third quarter**

- ARI – Trey McBride 1-yard pass from Kyler Murray (kick blocked), 8:31. Rams 10–6. **Drive: 13 plays, 68 yards, 6:29.**

**Fourth quarter**

- ARI – Chad Ryland 28-yard field goal, 14:00. Rams 10–9. **Drive: 14 plays, 80 yards, 7:19.**
- LAR – Joshua Karty 25-yard field goal, 6:33. Rams 13–9. **Drive: 13 plays, 60 yards, 7:27.**

**Top passers**

- ARI – Kyler Murray – 33/48, 321 yards, TD, 2 INT
- LAR – Matthew Stafford – 17/32, 189 yards

**Top rushers**

- ARI – Michael Carter – 13 rushes, 70 yards
- LAR – Kyren Williams – 13 rushes, 56 yards, TD

**Top receivers**

- ARI – Trey McBride – 12 receptions, 123 yards, TD
- LAR – Puka Nacua – 10 receptions, 129 yards

Cornerback Ahkello Witherspoon's diving interception at the goal line with under 40 seconds remaining in the game allowed the Rams to escape with a victory over the Cardinals and make a major step towards securing their fourth NFC West division title in eight seasons. Despite Arizona having significant advantages in rushing yards (113 to 68), passing yards (283 to 189), first downs (24 to 12), total plays (74 to 54), and time of possession (36:55 to 23:05), Los Angeles got the win on the strength of its defense, which collected four sacks and came up with two interceptions in Rams territory late in the fourth quarter. Rookie defensive tackle Braden Fiske collected two sacks against Cardinals quarterback Kyler Murray, who was harassed constantly by the Rams defense throughout the game. Following a scoreless first quarter, Los Angeles took a 10–0 halftime lead on a 1-yard touchdown run by running back Kyren Williams and a 53-yard field goal by kicker Joshua Karty, who added a 25-yard field goal midway through the fourth quarter. Williams ran 13 times for 56 yards on the ground, while wide receiver Puka Nacua caught 10 passes for 129 yards for the Rams. Following Karty's second field goal, Arizona drove into Rams territory, but Murray was intercepted by cornerback Kam Kinchens, who returned it to the L.A. 17. After the Rams failed to pick up a first down and punted away, the Cardinals drove to the L.A. 5-yard line. Murray then tried to find tight end Trey McBride, but his pass bounced off McBride's facemask and into the air, setting up Witherspoon's heroics. Strong safety Kamren Curl and inside linebacker Omar Speights shared the team lead in tackles with 10 each, while outside linebacker Byron Young had eight tackles and a sack. With the victory on Saturday night, the Rams would clinch the NFC West the next day following wins by the Bengals, Bills, Vikings, and Commanders, securing for them the Strength of Victory tiebreaker over the Seattle Seahawks.

==== Week 18: vs. Seattle Seahawks ====
Week 18: Seattle Seahawks at Los Angeles Rams – Game summary

Quarter	1	2	3	4	Total
**Seahawks**	7	10	7	6	**30**
Rams	3	10	3	9	**25**

at SoFi Stadium, Inglewood, California

- Date: January 5
- Game time: 1:25 p.m. PST
- Game weather: Sunny, 76 °F (24 °C) (fixed roof)
- Game attendance: 72,610
- Referee: Bill Vinovich
- TV announcers (Fox): Kenny Albert, Jonathan Vilma and Megan Olivi
- Recap, Game Book

Game information

**First quarter**

- SEA – Jake Bobo 4-yard pass from Geno Smith (Jason Myers kick), 5:21. Seahawks 7–0. **Drive: 5 plays, 55 yards, 3:11.**
- LAR – Joshua Karty 37-yard field goal, 0:37. Seahawks 7–3. **Drive: 9 plays, 44 yards, 4:44.**

**Second quarter**

- SEA – DK Metcalf 20-yard pass from Geno Smith (Jason Myers kick), 12:48. Seahawks 14–3. **Drive: 7 plays, 70 yards, 2:49.**
- LAR – Tyler Higbee 6-yard pass from Jimmy Garoppolo (Joshua Karty kick), 8:47. Seahawks 14–10. **Drive: 8 plays, 78 yards, 4:01.**
- SEA – Jason Myers 56-yard field goal, 3:21. Seahawks 17–10. **Drive: 9 plays, 35 yards, 5:26.**
- LAR – Joshua Karty 58-yard field goal, 0:00. Seahawks 17–13. **Drive: 5 plays, 40 yards, 0:53.**

**Third quarter**

- LAR – Joshua Karty 57-yard field goal, 7:54. Seahawks 17–16. **Drive: 9 plays, 40 yards, 5:28.**
- SEA – AJ Barner 4-yard pass from Geno Smith (Jason Myers kick), 3:00. Seahawks 24–16. **Drive: 10 plays, 70 yards, 4:54.**

**Fourth quarter**

- LAR – Tyler Johnson 4-yard pass from Jimmy Garoppolo (pass failed), 12:43. Seahawks 24–22. **Drive: 9 plays, 70 yards, 5:17.**
- LAR – Joshua Karty 38-yard field goal, 7:29. Rams 25–24. **Drive: 7 plays, 58 yards, 3:42.**
- SEA – Noah Fant 16-yard pass from Geno Smith (pass failed), 3:19. Seahawks 30–25. **Drive: 8 plays, 70 yards, 4:10.**

**Top passers**

- SEA – Geno Smith – 20/27, 223 yards, 4 TD
- LAR – Jimmy Garoppolo – 27/41, 334 yards, 2 TD, INT

**Top rushers**

- SEA – Zach Charbonnet – 14 rushes, 59 yards
- LAR – Ronnie Rivers – 12 rushes, 48 yards

**Top receivers**

- SEA – Noah Fant – 5 receptions, 63 yards, TD
- LAR – Jordan Whittington – 3 receptions, 86 yards

Having assured themselves of an NFC West title and a home playoff game, the Rams opted to rest much of their starting lineup against the visiting Seahawks. Quarterback Matthew Stafford, running back Kyren Williams, wide receivers Cooper Kupp and Puka Nacua, and linemen Rob Havenstein and Kevin Dotson were inactive for the game, while most defensive starters were also benched or saw limited action. Despite the limited roster, Los Angeles fought back from a 14–3 second quarter deficit to claim a 25–24 lead midway through the fourth quarter. Getting the start at quarterback, Jimmy Garoppolo completed 27 of 41 passes for 334 yards and threw touchdown passes to tight end Tyler Higbee and wide receiver Tyler Johnson, while kicker Joshua Karty converted four field goals (37, 58, 57, 38), the last coming with 7:29 remaining. But Seattle rallied to retake the lead as quarterback Geno Smith threw his fourth touchdown pass of the game, the last to tight end Noah Fant on a 16-yard TD play with 3:19 left. Starting from their own 30, the Rams drove 61 yards in 12 plays to the Seattle 9 before Garoppolo's final pass fell incomplete with 18 seconds left. Wide receiver Jordan Whittington led Los Angeles with three receptions for 86 yards while also rushing two times for 12 yards. Linebacker Jake Hummel had eight tackles to lead the Rams on defense.

=== Standings ===
==== Division ====
NFC West
	W	L	T	PCT	DIV	CONF	PF	PA	STK
^{(4)} Los Angeles Rams	10	7	0	.588	4–2	6–6	367	386	L1
Seattle Seahawks	10	7	0	.588	4–2	6–6	375	368	W2
Arizona Cardinals	8	9	0	.471	3–3	4–8	400	379	W1
San Francisco 49ers	6	11	0	.353	1–5	4–8	389	436	L4

==== Conference ====
NFC
Seed	Team	Division	W	L	T	PCT	DIV	CONF	SOS	SOV	STK
**Division leaders**
1	Detroit Lions	North	15	2	0	.882	6–0	11–1	.516	.494	W3
2	Philadelphia Eagles	East	14	3	0	.824	5–1	9–3	.453	.424	W2
3 (Note: Tampa Bay clinched the #3 seed over Los Angeles based on conference record. (Tampa Bay 8–4 to Los Angeles 6–6))	Tampa Bay Buccaneers	South	10	7	0	.588	4–2	8–4	.502	.465	W2
4 (Note: Los Angeles clinched the NFC West and #4 seed over Seattle based on strength of victory. (Los Angeles .441 to Seattle .424))	Los Angeles Rams	West	10	7	0	.588	4–2	6–6	.505	.441	L1
**Wild cards**
5	Minnesota Vikings	North	14	3	0	.824	4–2	9–3	.474	.408	L1
6	Washington Commanders	East	12	5	0	.706	4–2	9–3	.436	.358	W5
7	Green Bay Packers	North	11	6	0	.647	1–5	6–6	.533	.412	L2
**Did not qualify for the postseason**
8	Seattle Seahawks	West	10	7	0	.588	4–2	6–6	.498	.424	W2
9 (Note: Atlanta finished ahead of Arizona based on conference record. (Atlanta 7–5 to Arizona 4–8))	Atlanta Falcons	South	8	9	0	.471	4–2	7–5	.519	.426	L2
10	Arizona Cardinals	West	8	9	0	.471	3–3	4–8	.536	.404	W1
11	Dallas Cowboys	East	7	10	0	.412	3–3	5–7	.522	.387	L2
12	San Francisco 49ers	West	6	11	0	.353	1–5	4–8	.564	.402	L4
13 (Note: Chicago finished ahead of Carolina based on head-to-head victory.)	Chicago Bears	North	5	12	0	.294	1–5	3–9	.554	.388	W1
14 (Note: Carolina finished ahead of New Orleans based on strength of victory. (Carolina .329 to New Orleans .306))	Carolina Panthers	South	5	12	0	.294	2–4	4–8	.498	.329	W1
15	New Orleans Saints	South	5	12	0	.294	2–4	4–8	.505	.306	L4
16	New York Giants	East	3	14	0	.176	0–6	1–11	.554	.412	L1
**Tiebreakers** (Note: When breaking ties for three or more teams under the NFL's rules, they are first broken within divisions, then comparing only the highest ranked remaining team from each division.)

== Postseason ==
=== Schedule ===
Round	Date	Opponent (seed)	Result	Record	Venue	Recap
Wild Card	January 13	Minnesota Vikings (5)	W 27–9	1–0	State Farm Stadium (Note: Due to the then-ongoing Southern California wildfires, the Rams had to play the Wild Card playoff game against the Vikings at this stadium.)	Recap
Divisional	January 19	at Philadelphia Eagles (2)	L 22–28	1–1	Lincoln Financial Field	Recap

=== Game summaries ===
==== NFC Wild Card Playoffs: vs. (5) Minnesota Vikings ====
NFC Wild Card Playoffs: (5) Minnesota Vikings at (4) Los Angeles Rams – Game summary

Quarter	1	2	3	4	Total
Vikings	0	3	6	0	9
Rams	10	14	3	0	27

at State Farm Stadium, Glendale, Arizona

- Date: January 13, 2025
- Game time: 6:00 p.m. MST/5:00 p.m. PST
- Game weather: None (retractable roof closed)
- Game attendance: 64,515
- Referee: John Hussey
- TV announcers (ESPN/ABC/ESPN2/ESPN+): Joe Buck, Troy Aikman, Lisa Salters and Laura Rutledge
- Recap, Game Book

Game information

First quarter

- LAR – Kyren Williams 5-yard pass from Matthew Stafford (Joshua Karty kick), 10:22. Rams 7–0. Drive: 7 plays, 70 yards, 4:38.
- LAR – Joshua Karty 34-yard field goal, 4:01. Rams 10–0. Drive: 8 plays, 62 yards, 4:09.

Second quarter

- MIN – Will Reichard 34-yard field goal, 14:17. Rams 10–3. Drive: 9 plays, 54 yards, 4:44.
- LAR – Jared Verse 57-yard fumble return (Joshua Karty kick), 4:35. Rams 17–3.
- LAR – Davis Allen 13-yard pass from Matthew Stafford (Joshua Karty kick), 0:15. Rams 24–3. Drive: 5 plays, 39 yards, 1:12.

Third quarter

- LAR – Joshua Karty 44-yard field goal, 7:19. Rams 27–3. Drive: 11 plays, 51 yards, 6:13.
- MIN – T. J. Hockenson 26-yard pass from Sam Darnold (pass failed), 5:05. Rams 27–9. Drive: 6 plays, 62 yards, 2:14.

Fourth quarter

- No scoring plays.

Top passers

- MIN – Sam Darnold – 25/40, 245 yards, TD, INT
- LAR – Matthew Stafford – 19/27, 209 yards, 2 TD

Top rushers

- MIN – Aaron Jones – 13 rushes, 48 yards
- LAR – Kyren Williams – 16 rushes, 76 yards

Top receivers

- MIN – T. J. Hockenson – 5 receptions, 64 yards, TD
- LAR – Tyler Higbee – 5 receptions, 58 yards

Forced to play at a neutral site amid the January 2025 Southern California wildfires, the NFC West champion Rams turned in a solid performance in dominating the Minnesota Vikings in an NFC Wild Card Game played at State Farm Stadium in Glendale, Arizona on Monday Night Football. As a series of fires ravaged several areas of Los Angeles County, the decision was made out of a concern for public safety and to ease the burden on Los Angeles County police and fire department resources to move the game originally set for SoFi Stadium. Not only did the Arizona Cardinals prepare their home stadium and practice facility for their division rivals to use, team owner Michael Bidwill dispatched the franchise's two Boeing 777 aircraft to fly not only Rams players and coaches to Arizona, but also team support staff as well as families and pets.

Receiving the opening kickoff, Los Angeles drove 70 yards in seven plays with quarterback Matthew Stafford throwing a 5-yard touchdown pass to running back Kyren Williams. After forcing Minnesota to a three-and-out, the Rams followed up with a 34-yard field goal by kicker Joshua Karty. Holding a 10–3 lead into the second quarter, the Rams came up with turnovers on back-to-back drives as Vikings quarterback Sam Darnold was intercepted by cornerback Cobie Durant near midfield to snuff out one drive. On Minnesota's next possession, Darnold was sacked on a blitz by cornerback Ahkello Witherspoon and stripped of the ball, which was then picked up by outside linebacker Jared Verse and the rookie Pro Bowler returned it 57 yards for a touchdown. The Vikings gambled on a fourth-and-2 play at midfield with 1:32 remaining, but the ploy backfired as Darnold was sacked again for the sixth time in the first half. The Rams moved 39 yards in five plays with Stafford finding tight end Davis Allen for a 13-yard TD pass with 15 seconds remaining before halftime. Karty added a 44-yard field goal on L.A.'s first possession of the second half, and the defense added three more sacks of Darnold to set a new team record as well as tie an NFL mark with nine total sacks in a playoff game. Stafford completed 19 of 27 passes for 208 yards and two scores, while tight end Tyler Higbee led the team with five receptions for 58 yards (all in the first quarter), including a 23-yard reception that set up L.A.'s first score of the game. However, Higbee suffered a chest injury later in the first half which forced him from the game and he did not return. Wide receiver Puka Nacua added five receptions for 44 yards, while Kyren Williams had 17 carries for 76 yards and three receptions for 16 yards and a TD. Safety Quentin Lake had a team-high nine tackles and eight defenders shared in the team's nine sacks (defensive end Kobie Turner led with two).

==== NFC Divisional Playoffs: at (2) Philadelphia Eagles ====
NFC Divisional Playoffs: (4) Los Angeles Rams at (2) Philadelphia Eagles – Game summary

Quarter	1	2	3	4	Total
Rams	7	3	5	7	22
Eagles	13	0	3	12	28

at Lincoln Financial Field, Philadelphia, Pennsylvania

- Date: January 19, 2025
- Game time: 3:00 p.m. EST/12:00 p.m. PST
- Game weather: Snow, 34 °F (1 °C)
- Game attendance: 69,879
- Referee: Shawn Smith
- TV announcers (NBC): Mike Tirico, Cris Collinsworth, Melissa Stark and Kaylee Hartung
- Recap, Game Book

Game information

First quarter

- PHI – Jalen Hurts 44-yard run (kick failed), 11:55. Eagles 6–0. Drive: 6 plays, 74 yards, 3:05.
- LAR – Tyler Higbee 4-yard pass from Matthew Stafford (Joshua Karty kick), 6:32. Rams 7–6. Drive: 13 plays, 67 yards, 5:23.
- PHI – Saquon Barkley 62-yard run (Jake Elliott kick), 1:07. Eagles 13–7. Drive: 3 plays, 83 yards, 1:34.

Second quarter

- LAR – Joshua Karty 30-yard field goal, 12:47. Eagles 13–10. Drive: 6 plays, 58 yards, 3:20.

Third quarter

- LAR – Joshua Karty 34-yard field goal, 7:37. Tied 13–13. Drive: 8 plays, 58 yards, 4:22.
- PHI – Jake Elliott 44-yard field goal, 2:19. Eagles 16–13. Drive: 9 plays, 44 yards, 5:18.
- LAR – Jalen Hurts sacked in the end zone for a safety, 0:26. Eagles 16–15.

Fourth quarter

- PHI – Jake Elliott 23-yard field goal, 13:23. Eagles 19–15. Drive: 4 plays, 5 yards, 1:26.
- PHI – Jake Elliott 37-yard field goal, 6:18. Eagles 22–15. Drive: 8 plays, 19 yards, 4:46.
- PHI – Saquon Barkley 78-yard run (kick failed), 4:36. Eagles 28–15. Drive: 1 play, 78 yards, 0:11.
- LAR – Colby Parkinson 4-yard pass from Matthew Stafford (Joshua Karty kick), 2:48. Eagles 28–22. Drive: 10 plays, 70 yards, 1:48.

Top passers

- LAR – Matthew Stafford – 26/44, 324 yards, 2 TD
- PHI – Jalen Hurts – 15/20, 128 yards

Top rushers

- LAR – Kyren Williams – 19 rushes, 106 yards
- PHI – Saquon Barkley – 26 rushes, 205 yards, 2 TD

Top receivers

- LAR – Puka Nacua – 6 receptions, 97 yards
- PHI – Dallas Goedert – 4 receptions, 56 yards

After a closely-fought battle through three quarters, the Rams suffered fumbles on back-to-back drives to start the fourth quarter as the host Eagles scored 13 unanswered points to take a 28–15 lead before L.A. staged a dramatic rally that fell short in an NFC Divisional Playoff game at Lincoln Financial Field. After Philadelphia scored on its opening possession with a 44-yard TD run by quarterback Jalen Hurts, Los Angeles answered with a 13-play, 67-yard drive that ended with a 4-yard touchdown pass from quarterback Matthew Stafford to tight end Tyler Higbee and a 7–6 Rams lead. After a 62-yard touchdown run by running back Saquon Barkley put the Eagles back in the lead 13–7, kicker Joshua Karty converted field goals of 30 and 34 yards in the second and third quarters, respectively, to tie the score. The Eagles answered Karty's second kick with a 44-yard field goal by Jake Elliott, but the Rams closed the margin again late in the third quarter as nose tackle Neville Gallimore sacked Hurts in the end zone for a safety. Philadelphia was forced to free kick as a result, but on L.A.'s next possession, running back Kyren Williams was stripped of the ball by Eagles defensive tackle Jalen Carter. The turnover led to another Elliott field goal, and on the next possession, the Rams moved to near midfield when Stafford was sacked by linebacker Nolan Smith, which led to a third field goal by Elliott. The Eagles then forced the Rams to punt on their next possession and one play later Barkley, who finished with 205 rushing yards on 26 carries, scored on a 78-yard run that appeared to put the game away. But the Rams rallied by marching 70 yards in 10 plays, with Stafford finding tight end Colby Parkinson for a 4-yard touchdown pass with 2:51 remaining. L.A.'s defense thwarted the Eagles with a big play coming as defensive end Kobie Turner sacked Hurts for a 12-yard loss. Starting from their own 18 with 2:23 left, the Rams pushed deep into Eagles territory, the key play coming when Stafford found wide receiver Puka Nacua for a 37-yard gain down to the Philadelphia 21. Another completion to Nacua got the Rams to the Eagle 13-yard line to set up a third-and-2 play. But Carter got his second sack of the game, throwing down Stafford for a 9-yard loss, and the Rams' QB's final pass attempt on fourth down sailed out of bounds and incomplete. Nacua led the Rams on offense with six receptions for 97 yards, while Stafford completed 26 of 44 passes for 324 yards. Williams ran 19 times for 106 yards and had a season-long 30-yard run that helped set up a Rams field goal. The L.A. defense registered seven sacks in the game (after totaling nine sacks a week earlier in the Wild Card Round), led by rookie outside linebacker Jared Verse who had two. Linebacker Christian Rozeboom had eight tackles to lead the Rams as the team's 2024 season came to a close.

== Awards and honors ==
Recipient	Award(s)
Jared Verse	September: NFL Defensive Rookie of the Month; NFL Defensive Rookie of the Year, PFWA All-Rookie Team
Cobie Durant	Week 7: NFC Defensive Player of the Week
Kamren Kinchens	Week 9: NFC Defensive Player of the Week; Week 11: NFC Defensive Player of the Week
Braden Fiske	November: NFL Defensive Rookie of the Month; PFWA All-Rookie Team
Joshua Karty	December: NFC Special Teams Player of the Month
Jordan Whittington	PFWA All-Rookie Team
