= Colby Parkinson =

American football player (born 1999)

No. 84 – Los Angeles Rams
- Position: Tight end
- Roster status: Active

Personal information
- Born: January 8, 1999 (age 27); San Ramon, California, U.S.
- Listed height: 6 ft 7 in (2.01 m)
- Listed weight: 266 lb (121 kg)

Career information
- High school: Oaks Christian (Westlake Village, California)
- College: Stanford (2017–2019)
- NFL draft: 2020: 4th round, 133rd overall pick

Career history
- Seattle Seahawks (2020–2023); Los Angeles Rams (2024–present)

Awards and highlights
- Second-team All-Pac-12 (2019)

Career NFL statistics as of Week 9, 2026
- Receptions: 148
- Receiving yards: 1,436
- Receiving touchdowns: 14
- Stats at Pro Football Reference

Colby John Parkinson (born January 8, 1999) is an American professional football tight end for the Los Angeles Rams of the National Football League (NFL). He played college football for the Stanford Cardinal and was selected by the Seattle Seahawks in the fourth round of the 2020 NFL draft.

== Early life ==
Parkinson attended Oaks Christian School in Westlake Village, California, where he played varsity football and basketball. Playing for head coach Jim Benkert during his career at Oaks Christian, Parkinson was also teammates with fellow future NFL players Michael Pittman Jr. and Darnay Holmes. In 2015, his junior football season, he caught 24 passes for 489 yards and four touchdowns. In December of the same year he committed to play college football at Stanford University. During his senior year, Parkinson caught 33 passes for 531 yards and two TDs in leading the Lions to a second straight Marmonte League title. He capped his high school football career by playing in the U.S. Army All-American Bowl, and was named to the USA Today All-USA first team and was named a four- or five-star recruit by numerous scouting outfits and publications.

== College career ==
In 2017, Parkinson's freshman year at Stanford, he appeared in all 14 of Stanford's games, catching ten passes for 97 yards and four touchdowns.

As a sophomore in 2018, Parkinson played in 13 games (nine starts), catching 29 passes for 485 yards and seven touchdowns. On November 10, in a game versus Oregon State, Parkinson had six catches for 166 yards and four touchdowns, tying the Stanford record for most touchdowns in a single game for a tight end. He earned All-Pac-12 Conference honorable mention.

After his 2019 junior season where he had 48 catches for 589 yards and one touchdown, Parkinson announced that he would forgo his senior season and enter the 2020 NFL draft.

== Professional career ==
Pre-draft measurables
Height	Weight	Arm length	Hand span	Wingspan	40-yard dash	10-yard split	20-yard split	20-yard shuttle	Three-cone drill	Vertical jump	Broad jump	Bench press
6 ft 7 1/4 in (2.01 m)	252 lb (114 kg)	33 1/4 in (0.84 m)	9 5/8 in (0.24 m)	6 ft 6 5/8 in (2.00 m)	4.77 s	1.65 s	2.81 s	4.46 s	7.15 s	32.5 in (0.83 m)	9 ft 1 in (2.77 m)	18 reps
All values from NFL Combine

=== Seattle Seahawks ===
In the 2020 NFL draft, Parkinson was selected in the fourth round with the 133rd overall pick by the Seattle Seahawks. He was placed on the active/non-football injury list at the start of training camp on August 3, 2020. He was moved to the reserve/non-football injury list at the start of the regular season on September 5, 2020. He was activated on October 31. He appeared in six games as a rookie, catching two passes for 16 yards, both of which came in a 40–3 win over the New York Giants in Week 14.

On September 7, 2021, Parkinson was placed on injured reserve with a broken foot. He returned to the roster on October 2, 2021. He caught five passes for 33 yards while appearing in 14 games during the 2021 season and made his first career start in a 38–30 win at Arizona in Week 18 in which he caught two passes for 14 yards.

In Week 1 of the 2022 season, Parkinson scored his first NFL touchdown on a 25-yard pass from Geno Smith in the Seahawks' 17–16 victory over the Denver Broncos. He finished the regular season with 25 receptions for 322 receiving yards and two receiving touchdowns in 17 games and two starts. In the 2023 season, he finished with 25 receptions for 247 yards and two touchdowns.

=== Los Angeles Rams ===
On March 14, 2024, Parkinson signed a three-year contract with the Los Angeles Rams worth up to $22.5 million. In the 2024 season, he played in all 17 regular season games, starting in nine, and finished with 30 receptions for 294 yards. Against Green Bay in Week 5, Parkinson caught a career single-game best seven receptions for 52 yards in L.A.'s 24–19 loss. Parkinson scored his only touchdown of the season on a 19-yard reception in the Rams' 28–22 victory over New England in Week 11. Against Philadelphia in the NFC Divisional Round, he had a receiving touchdown in the Rams' 28–22 loss.

In 2025, Parkinson started in 10 out of 15 games he played in, as the Rams began to frequently utilize a "13 Personnel" set involving multiple tight ends. He set new single season marks with 43 receptions for 408 yards. Against Detroit in Week 15, Parkinson set a new single-game career high for receiving yards with 75 (on five receptions) in the Rams' 41–34 win, during which he scored two touchdowns for the first multi-TD game of his career. Parkinson caught two more touchdowns in L.A.'s season-ending 37–20 victory over Arizona in Week 18, setting a new team single season record for touchdown receptions by a tight end with eight (breaking the previous mark of six shared by Damone Johnson, Troy Drayton, and Roland Williams). Against the Carolina Panthers in an NFC Wild Card Game on January 10, 2026, Parkinson had two receptions for 34 yards, including a 19-yard touchdown for the game-winning score with 38 seconds remaining in the Rams' 34–31 victory. The following week in an NFC Divisional round game, Parkinson caught three passes for 56 yards to help the Rams defeat the Chicago Bears 20–17 in overtime. In the NFC Championship Game against the Seattle Seahawks, Parkinson had three receptions for 62 yards in the Rams' 31–27 loss.

== NFL career statistics ==
Legend
**Bold**	Career high

=== Regular season ===
Year	Team	Games		Receiving					Kick returns					Fumbles	
Year	Team	GP	GS	Rec	Yds	Avg	Lng	TD	Ret	Yds	Avg	Lng	TD	Fum	Lost
2020	SEA	6	0	2	16	8.0	0	0	0	0	0.0	0	0	0	0
2021	SEA	14	1	5	33	6.6	12	0	**1**	13	13.0	13	0	0	0
2022	SEA	17	2	25	322	**12.9**	**39**	2	0	0	0.0	0	0	0	0
2023	SEA	17	1	25	247	9.9	27	2	**1**	**16**	**16.0**	**16**	0	0	0
2024	LAR	17	9	30	294	9.8	23	1	0	0	0.0	0	0	0	0
2025	LAR	15	10	**43**	**408**	9.5	26	**8**	0	0	0.0	0	0	**1**	**1**
2026	LAR	7	7	18	116	6.4	15	1	0	0	0.0	0	0	0	0
Career		93	30	148	1,436	9.7	39	14	2	29	14.5	16	0	1	1

=== Postseason ===
Year	Team	Games		Receiving					Kick returns					Fumbles	
Year	Team	GP	GS	Rec	Yds	Avg	Lng	TD	Ret	Yds	Avg	Lng	TD	Fum	Lost
2022	SEA	1	1	3	14	4.7	5	0	**1**	**14**	**14.0**	**14**	0	0	0
2024	LAR	2	1	4	22	5.5	7	**1**	0	0	0.0	0	0	0	0
2025	LAR	3	3	**8**	**152**	**19.0**	**40**	**1**	0	0	0.0	0	0	0	0
Career		6	5	15	188	12.5	40	2	1	14	14.0	14	0	0	0
