= Joshua Karty =

American football player (born 2002)

No. 16 – Los Angeles Rams
- Position: Kicker
- Roster status: Active

Personal information
- Born: March 7, 2002 (age 24); Burlington, North Carolina, U.S.
- Listed height: 6 ft 2 in (1.88 m)
- Listed weight: 208 lb (94 kg)

Career information
- High school: Western Alamance (Elon, North Carolina)
- College: Stanford (2020–2023)
- NFL draft: 2024: 6th round, 209th overall pick

Career history
- Los Angeles Rams (2024–2025); Arizona Cardinals (2025); Los Angeles Rams (2026–present)

Awards and highlights
- 2× First-team All-American (2022, 2023); 2× First-team All-Pac-12 (2022, 2023)

Career NFL statistics as of 2025
- Field goals made: 39
- Field goals attempted: 48
- Field goal %: 81.3
- Points scored: 168
- Longest field goal: 58
- Extra points made: 51
- Extra points attempted: 57
- Stats at Pro Football Reference

Joshua Karty (born March 7, 2002) is an American professional football kicker for the Los Angeles Rams of the National Football League (NFL). He played college football for the Stanford Cardinal, and was selected by the Los Angeles Rams in the sixth round of the 2024 NFL draft.

== Early life ==
Karty is the son of Valerie and Joel Karty, and is from Elon, North Carolina. Karty's father was a rower at Stanford while earning his Ph.D. in physical and organic chemistry. Valerie and Joel Karty were at Stanford Stadium when she informed him that she was pregnant with Joshua, who was born on March 7, 2002.

Karty played high school football at Western Alamance High School, as a placekicker and punter. He was ranked a consensus three-star prospect and the No. 1 kicking prospect in his class across 247Sports, Kohl's Kicking, and ESPN rankings. Karty earned a spot, and played in the 2020 Under Armour All-America Game.

Karty committed to Stanford on a full-scholarship, on January 20, 2019. He held scholarship offers from multiple other schools, including Georgia, UNC, and Appalachian State.

== College career ==
In Karty's first season in 2021, he went 27 for 27 on extra points and ten for fifteen on his field goals. During the 2022 season, he had his best performance versus Arizona State as he made five field goals as he helped Stanford beat Arizona State 15–14. Karty also had another outstanding performance in week eight of the 2022 season, where he went three for three in a win over Notre Dame, where for his performance he was named the Pac-12 special teams player of the week. Karty finished the 2022 season going 24 for 25 on his extra point attempts and 18 for 18 on field goal attempts, with a long of 61 yards. For his performance on the season, he was a finalist for the Lou Groza Award which is awarded to the nation's best kicker.

Heading into the 2023 season, Karty was named preseason first-team All-American. In week seven of the 2023 season, Karty made a 47-yard game-tying field goal to send the game into overtime, and then made the game-winning field goal in overtime, as he helped Stanford come back down 29–0 to beat Colorado 46–43 in double overtime. During the 2023 season, Karty went 21 for 21 on extra points and 23 for 27 on his field goal attempts. After the conclusion of the 2023 season, Karty declared for the 2024 NFL draft.

== Professional career ==
Pre-draft measurables
Height	Weight	Arm length	Hand span	Wingspan
6 ft 1 7/8 in (1.88 m)	207 lb (94 kg)	31 1/2 in (0.80 m)	9 1/8 in (0.23 m)	6 ft 4 3/8 in (1.94 m)
All values from NFL Combine

=== Los Angeles Rams (first stint) ===
Karty was selected by the Los Angeles Rams in the sixth round, 209th overall, of the 2024 NFL draft. He secured the starting kicker job during the preseason, converting 4-of-5 field goal attempts in three games. Karty made his regular season debut in the Rams' season opener, converting a 41-yard field goal on his first attempt in the first quarter and later adding a 26-yard field goal in the fourth quarter of the Rams' 20–26 overtime loss to the Detroit Lions. In Week 3, Karty converted two field goals in the fourth quarter. Of those two, Karty made a 37-yard kick with two seconds remaining in the game as the Rams secured a victory of 27–24 over the San Francisco 49ers; this was Karty's first game-winning field goal of his professional career. The following week, Karty converted 4-of-5 field goal attempts (including a 52-yarder) in the Rams' 18–24 loss to the Chicago Bears. Against the Miami Dolphins in Week 10, Karty converted 5-of-6 field goal attempts to account for all of his team's scoring as the Rams lost 15–23. At San Francisco in Week 15, Karty would again be the Rams' lone scorer, converting four field goals in the 12–6 victory. In their regular season finale against the Seattle Seahawks, Karty completed four field goals in four attempts, including a season-long 58-yarder, in the 25–30 loss. Over the regular season's final five weeks, Karty converted his last 13 field goal attempts and was named NFL Special Teams Player of the Month for December. In the Rams' postseason, Karty was perfect, converting field goals of 34 and 44 yards, as well as three PAT's, in the Rams' 27–9 victory over the Minnesota Vikings in the Wild Card Round. The following week, he added field goals of 30 and 34 yards, along with two PAT's, in the Rams' 22–28 loss to the Philadelphia Eagles in the Divisional Round.

Karty struggled during the 2025 season, making only 10 of 15 field goal attempts and missing three extra points, with the miscues contributing to L.A.'s losses to Philadelphia and San Francisco. After missing field goal and PAT attempts in the Rams' 34-10 win over New Orleans in Week 9, Karty was benched in favor of Harrison Mevis and was waived on November 28. Karty was re-signed to the practice squad on December 1.

=== Arizona Cardinals ===
On December 23, 2025, Karty was signed by the Arizona Cardinals off of the Rams' practice squad.

On April 7, 2026, Karty re-signed with the Cardinals. He was waived by Arizona on June 4.

=== Los Angeles Rams (second stint) ===
On October 28, 2026, Karty signed with the Los Angeles Rams practice squad. On November 5, he was signed to the active roster.

== NFL career statistics ==
=== Regular season ===
General			Field goals					PATs			Kickoffs			Points
Season	Team	GP	FGM	FGA	FG%	Blk	Lng	XPM	XPA	XP%	KO	Avg	TBs	Pts
2024	LAR	17	29	34	85.3	0	58	32	36	88.9	7	57	5	119
2025	LAR	8	10	15	66.7	2	51	23	26	88.5	36	60	11	53
2026	LAR	2	0	0	0.0	0	0	0	0	0.0	4	44	0	0
NFL career		27	39	49	79.6	2	58	55	62	88.7	52	58	18	172

=== Postseason ===
General			Field goals					PATs			Kickoffs			Points
Season	Team	GP	FGM	FGA	FG%	Blk	Lng	XPM	XPA	XP%	KO	Avg	TBs	Pts
2024	LAR	2	4	4	100.0	0	44	5	5	100.0	0	0.0	0	17
NFL career		2	4	4	100.0	0	44	5	5	100.0	0	0.0	0	17
