= Jaylen McCollough =

American football player (born 2000)

No. 2 – Los Angeles Rams
- Position: Strong safety
- Roster status: Active

Personal information
- Born: October 12, 2000 (age 26); Austell, Georgia, U.S.
- Listed height: 6 ft 0 in (1.83 m)
- Listed weight: 211 lb (96 kg)

Career information
- High school: Hillgrove (Powder Springs, Georgia)
- College: Tennessee (2019–2023)
- NFL draft: 2024: undrafted

Career history
- Los Angeles Rams (2024–present)

Career NFL statistics as of 2025
- Total tackles: 94
- Sacks: 2
- Pass deflections: 8
- Interceptions: 4
- Defensive touchdowns: 1
- Stats at Pro Football Reference

Jaylen "Tank" McCollough (born October 12, 2000) is an American professional football strong safety for the Los Angeles Rams of the National Football League (NFL). He played college football for the Tennessee Volunteers.

== Early life ==
Born and raised in Austell, Georgia, McCollough attended Hillgrove High School located in Powder Springs, Georgia. Coming out of high school, McCollough was rated as a four-star recruit, where he held offers from schools such as Alabama, Auburn, South Carolina, and Tennessee. Ultimately, McCollough committed to play college football for the Tennessee Volunteers.

== College career ==
McCollough's best season came in 2023 when he started all 13 games for the Volunteers, notching 58 tackles and three interceptions, with one being for a touchdown, where after the conclusion of the season he declared for the 2024 NFL draft. McCollough finished his five-year career from 2019 to 2023 with the Volunteers playing in 60 games where he started in a school record 51 of them, totaling 242 tackles with 15.5 being for a loss, two sacks, 16 pass deflections, six interceptions, a forced fumble, and a touchdown.

== Professional career ==
Pre-draft measurables
Height	Weight	Arm length	Hand span	Wingspan	40-yard dash	10-yard split	20-yard split	20-yard shuttle	Three-cone drill	Vertical jump	Broad jump	Bench press
6 ft 0 in (1.83 m)	202 lb (92 kg)	31 1/2 in (0.80 m)	8 3/8 in (0.21 m)	6 ft 2 3/8 in (1.89 m)	4.74 s	1.62 s	2.65 s	4.58 s	7.52 s	32 in (0.81 m)	9 ft 7 in (2.92 m)	17 reps
All values from Pro Day

After not being selected in the 2024 NFL draft, McCollough signed with the Los Angeles Rams as an undrafted free agent. He was one of four UDFAs signed by the Rams to make the team's initial 53 man roster.

McCollough intercepted his first pass, thrown by quarterback Jordan Love on October 6, 2024, which he returned four yards for his first NFL career touchdown during the Rams’ Week 5 loss to the Green Bay Packers.

== NFL career statistics ==
Legend
**Bold**	Career high

=== Regular season ===
Year	Team	Games		Tackles					Interceptions						Fumbles				
Year	Team	GP	GS	Cmb	Solo	Ast	Sck	TFL	Int	Yds	Avg	Lng	TD	PD	FF	Fum	FR	Yds	TD
2024	LAR	**17**	1	43	26	**17**	0.0	0	**4**	**6**	**1.5**	**4**	**1**	**4**	0	0	0	0	0
2025	LAR	**17**	**6**	**51**	**36**	15	**2.0**	**2**	0	0	0.0	0	0	**4**	0	0	0	0	0
Career		34	7	94	62	32	2.0	2	4	6	1.5	4	1	8	0	0	0	0	0

=== Postseason ===
Year	Team	Games		Tackles					Interceptions						Fumbles				
Year	Team	GP	GS	Cmb	Solo	Ast	Sck	TFL	Int	Yds	Avg	Lng	TD	PD	FF	Fum	FR	Yds	TD
2024	LAR	2	0	8	4	4	1.0	1	0	0	0.0	0	0	0	0	0	0	0	0
2025	LAR	3	0	4	4	0	0.0	0	0	0	0.0	0	0	2	0	0	0	0	0
Career		5	0	12	8	4	1.0	1	0	0	0.0	0	0	2	0	0	0	0	0

== Personal life ==
On October 10, 2022, McCollough was arrested on felony assault charges, after a man allegedly entered McCollough's apartment by accident, where McCullough proceeded to punch him causing him to lose consciousness. On June 16, 2023, McCollough was officially indicted on a felony aggravated charge where he faced a 3 to 15-year prison sentence. On September 13, 2023, McCollough's trial date was set to begin on February 12, 2024. On February 9, 2024, McCollough pleaded guilty to a misdemeanor assault charge where he was put on probation for a year and ordered to pay $22,000 to the victim.
