= Quentin Lake =

American football player (born 1999)

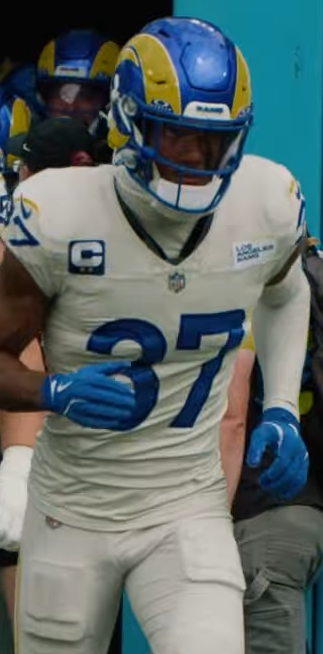
- Lake with the Los Angeles Rams in 2025

No. 37 – Los Angeles Rams
- Position: Free safety
- Roster status: Active

Personal information
- Born: January 29, 1999 (age 27); Pittsburgh, Pennsylvania, U.S.
- Listed height: 6 ft 1 in (1.85 m)
- Listed weight: 204 lb (93 kg)

Career information
- High school: Mater Dei (Santa Ana, California)
- College: UCLA (2017–2021)
- NFL draft: 2022: 6th round, 211th overall pick

Career history
- Los Angeles Rams (2022–present)

Awards and highlights
- Second-team All-Pac-12 (2021)

Career NFL statistics as of Week 1, 2026
- Total tackles: 245
- Sacks: 4.0
- Forced fumbles: 1
- Fumble recoveries: 2
- Pass deflections: 25
- Interceptions: 2
- Stats at Pro Football Reference

Quentin James Lake (born January 29, 1999) is an American professional football free safety for the Los Angeles Rams of the National Football League (NFL). He played college football for the UCLA Bruins and was selected by the Rams in the sixth round of the 2022 NFL draft.

== Early life ==
Lake was born in Pittsburgh, Pennsylvania and grew up in Irvine, California. He is the son of former NFL player Carnell Lake. He attended Mater Dei High School in Santa Ana, California.

== Professional career ==
Pre-draft measurables
Height	Weight	Arm length	Hand span	Wingspan	40-yard dash	10-yard split	20-yard split
6 ft 1 3/8 in (1.86 m)	201 lb (91 kg)	31 1/4 in (0.79 m)	9 1/8 in (0.23 m)	6 ft 4 1/4 in (1.94 m)	4.59 s	1.56 s	2.66 s
All values from NFL Combine

Lake was selected by the Los Angeles Rams with the 211th pick in the sixth round of the 2022 NFL draft. He was placed on the reserve/physically unable to perform (PUP) list to start the regular season. Lake was activated from the reserve/PUP list on November 12, 2022.

Lake made 14 appearances (four starts) for Los Angeles in 2023, recording six pass deflections, one fumble recovery, and 53 combined tackles. He appeared in all 17 games (including 16 starts) for the Rams during the 2024 campaign, logging five pass deflections, two sacks, and 111 combined tackles.

Lake began the 2025 season as one of Los Angeles' starting safeties, recording one interception, 10 pass deflections, one forced fumble, one sack, and 61 combined tackles across 10 appearances. On November 19, 2025, Lake was placed on injured reserve after undergoing surgery to repair an elbow dislocation suffered in the team's Week 11 matchup against the Seattle Seahawks.

On January 1, 2026, Lake signed a three-year, $42 million contract extension with the Rams. He was activated on January 6, ahead of the team's Wild Card matchup against the Carolina Panthers.

== NFL career statistics ==
Legend
**Bold**	Career high

=== Regular season ===
Year	Team	Games		Tackles					Interceptions						Fumbles				
Year	Team	GP	GS	Cmb	Solo	Ast	Sck	TFL	Int	Yds	Avg	Lng	TD	PD	FF	Fum	FR	Yds	TD
2022	LAR	9	0	10	8	2	1.0	1	0	0	0.0	0	0	1	0	0	0	0	0
2023	LAR	14	4	53	42	11	0.0	1	0	0	0.0	0	0	6	0	0	**1**	0	0
2024	LAR	17	16	**111**	**73**	**38**	**2.0**	1	0	0	0.0	0	0	5	0	0	0	0	0
2025	LAR	10	10	61	37	24	1.0	**2**	**1**	0	0.0	0	0	**10**	**1**	0	**1**	**20**	0
2026	LAR	1	1	10	7	3	0.0	0	1	0	0.0	0	0	3	0	0	0	0	0
Career		51	31	245	167	78	4.0	5	2	0	0.0	0	0	25	1	0	2	20	0

=== Postseason ===
Year	Team	Games		Tackles					Interceptions						Fumbles				
Year	Team	GP	GS	Cmb	Solo	Ast	Sck	TFL	Int	Yds	Avg	Lng	TD	PD	FF	Fum	FR	Yds	TD
2023	LAR	1	1	9	4	5	0.0	0	0	0	0.0	0	0	0	0	0	0	0	0
2024	LAR	2	2	14	**9**	5	0.0	**1**	0	0	0.0	0	0	1	0	0	0	0	0
2025	LAR	3	3	**20**	**9**	**11**	0.0	0	0	0	0.0	0	0	**3**	0	0	0	0	0
Career		6	6	43	22	21	0.0	1	0	0	0.0	0	0	4	0	0	0	0	0
