= Josh Wallace =

American football player (born 2000)

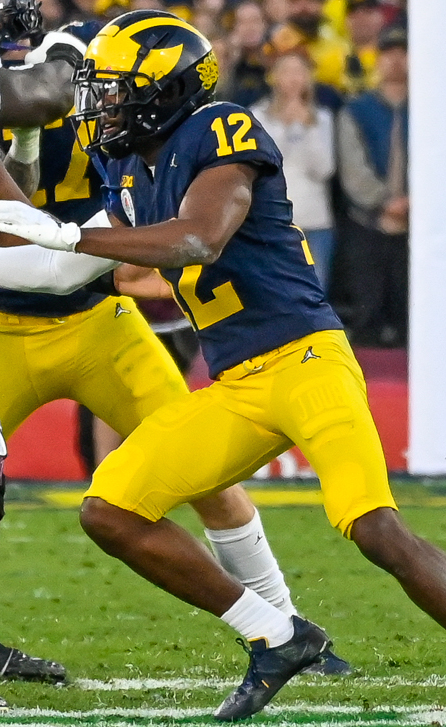
- Wallace with Michigan at the 2024 Rose Bowl

No. 30 – Los Angeles Rams
- Position: Cornerback
- Roster status: Active

Personal information
- Born: July 5, 2000 (age 26); Bowie, Maryland, U.S.
- Listed height: 6 ft 0 in (1.83 m)
- Listed weight: 190 lb (86 kg)

Career information
- High school: DeMatha Catholic (Hyattsville, Maryland)
- College: UMass (2019–2022); Michigan (2023)
- NFL draft: 2024: undrafted

Career history
- Los Angeles Rams (2024–present)

Awards and highlights
- CFP national champion (2023)

Career NFL statistics as of 2025
- Total tackles: 30
- Pass deflections: 5
- Interceptions: 1
- Stats at Pro Football Reference

Joshua Shawn Wallace (born July 5, 2000) is an American professional football cornerback for the Los Angeles Rams of the National Football League (NFL). He played college football for the UMass Minutemen and Michigan Wolverines, winning a national championship with Michigan in 2023.

== Early life ==
Wallace was born in Bowie, Maryland and attended DeMatha Catholic High School. He committed to play college football at the University of Massachusetts.

== College career ==
=== UMass ===
As a freshman, in the fifth week of the 2019 season, Wallace had a breakout game with eight tackles, a forced fumble, and a fumble recovery. He finished his first season with 31 tackles, an interception, a fumble recovery, and a forced fumble.

During the COVID-shortened 2020 season, Wallace finished his sophomore season with 12 tackles and five pass deflections. In the 2021 season, he recorded 51 tackles and a team-high 12 pass deflections as a junior.

In 2022, as a senior, Wallace tallied 41 tackles, three tackles for a loss, eight pass deflections, two interceptions and a fumble recovery. After the conclusion of the 2022 season, he entered the NCAA transfer portal.

During his tenure with the Minuteman, Wallace was a four-year starter and a team captain. He finished his career at UMass with 140 tackles, 28 pass deflections and three interceptions, playing over 2,000 snaps.

=== Michigan ===
Wallace transferred to the University of Michigan for the 2023 season. He stepped in as an immediate starter, playing in all 15 games. Wallace did not allow a touchdown against him all season, while totaling 33 tackles.

During the Rose Bowl, played on January 1, 2024, against Alabama, Wallace recorded two solo tackles and a 4th quarter fumble recovery to help seal the Wolverines' first College Football Playoff victory, en route to their national championship. Wallace was named All-Big Ten honorable mention.

== Professional career ==
Pre-draft measurables
Height	Weight	Arm length	Hand span	Wingspan	40-yard dash	10-yard split	20-yard split	20-yard shuttle	Three-cone drill	Vertical jump	Broad jump	Bench press
5 ft 11 1/8 in (1.81 m)	185 lb (84 kg)	31 3/8 in (0.80 m)	8 7/8 in (0.23 m)	6 ft 3 5/8 in (1.92 m)	4.69 s	1.58 s	2.67 s	4.35 s	7.03 s	34.5 in (0.88 m)	10 ft 4 in (3.15 m)	13 reps
All values from NFL Combine/Pro Day

Wallace signed with the Los Angeles Rams as an undrafted free agent on May 2, 2024.

== NFL career statistics ==
Legend
**Bold**	Career high

=== Regular season ===
Year	Team	Games		Tackles					Interceptions						Fumbles				
Year	Team	GP	GS	Cmb	Solo	Ast	Sck	TFL	Int	Yds	Avg	Lng	TD	PD	FF	Fum	FR	Yds	TD
2024	LAR	**17**	**3**	10	7	**3**	0.0	0	0	0	0.0	0	0	2	0	0	0	0	0
2025	LAR	15	0	**20**	**18**	2	0.0	0	**1**	**56**	**56.0**	**56**	0	**3**	0	0	0	0	0
Career		32	3	30	25	5	0.0	0	1	56	56.0	56	0	5	0	0	0	0	0

=== Postseason ===
Year	Team	Games		Tackles					Interceptions						Fumbles				
Year	Team	GP	GS	Cmb	Solo	Ast	Sck	TFL	Int	Yds	Avg	Lng	TD	PD	FF	Fum	FR	Yds	TD
2024	LAR	**2**	0	**2**	**1**	**1**	0.0	0	0	0	0.0	0	0	0	0	0	0	0	0
2025	LAR	**2**	0	1	**1**	0	0.0	0	0	0	0.0	0	0	0	0	0	0	0	0
Career		4	0	3	2	1	0.0	0	0	0	0.0	0	0	0	0	0	0	0	0
