= Braden Fiske =

American football player (born 2000)

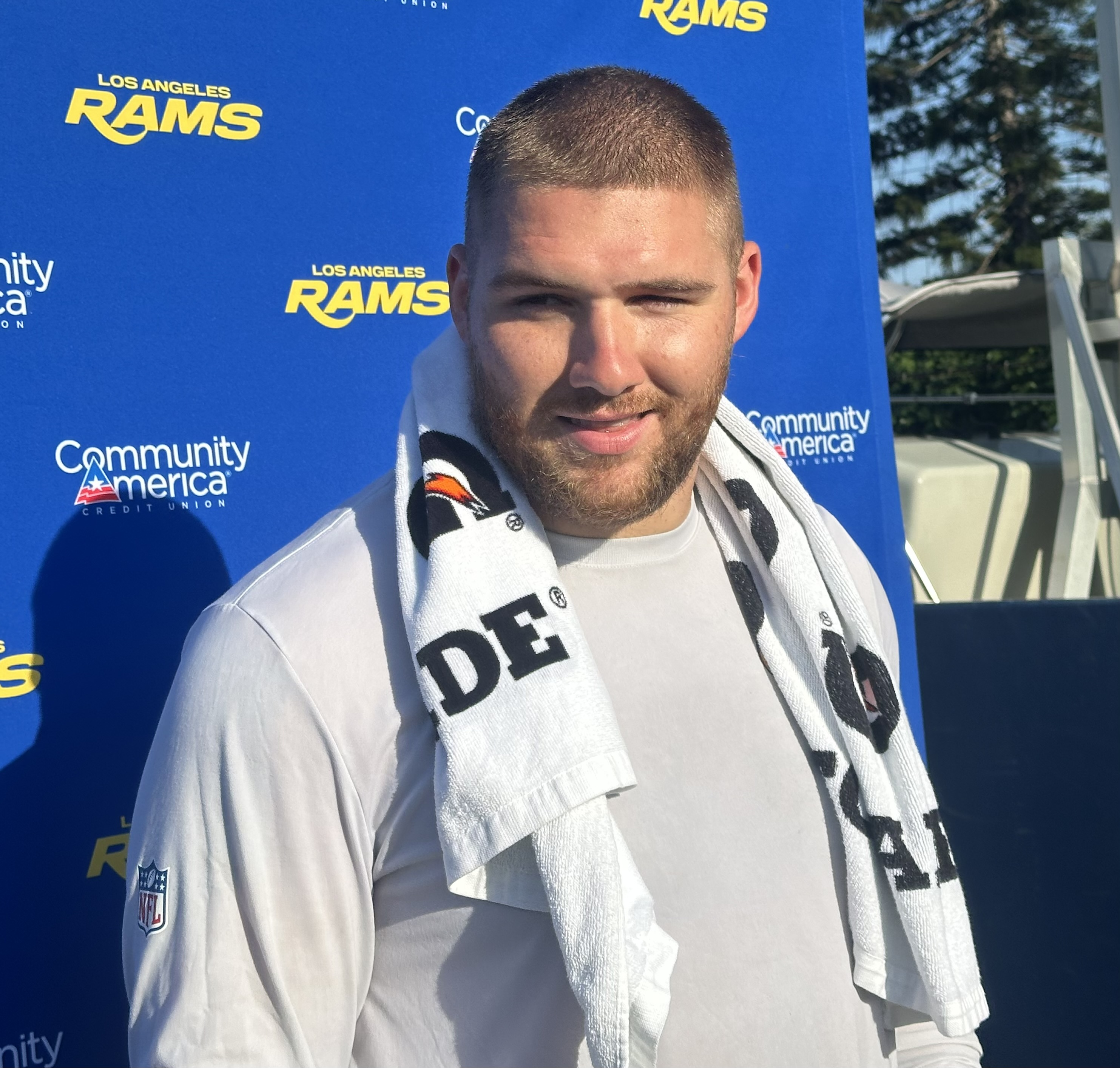
- Fiske with the Los Angeles Rams in 2026

No. 55 – Los Angeles Rams
- Position: Defensive end
- Roster status: Active

Personal information
- Born: January 18, 2000 (age 26); Michigan City, Indiana, U.S.
- Listed height: 6 ft 4 in (1.93 m)
- Listed weight: 294 lb (133 kg)

Career information
- High school: Michigan City
- College: Western Michigan (2019–2022); Florida State (2023)
- NFL draft: 2024: 2nd round, 39th overall pick

Career history
- Los Angeles Rams (2024–present)

Awards and highlights
- PFWA All-Rookie Team (2024); Second-team All-ACC (2023); Second-team All-MAC (2022)

Career NFL statistics as of 2025
- Total tackles: 74
- Sacks: 11.5
- Forced fumbles: 2
- Fumble recoveries: 3
- Pass deflections: 1
- Stats at Pro Football Reference

Braden Fiske (born January 18, 2000) is an American professional football defensive end for the Los Angeles Rams of the National Football League (NFL). He played college football for the Western Michigan Broncos and Florida State Seminoles.

== Early life ==
Braden Fiske was born on January 18, 2000, and grew up in Michigan City, Indiana.

== College career ==
Fiske attended Michigan City High School in Michigan City, Indiana. He committed to Western Michigan University to play college football.

Fiske played at Western Michigan from 2019 to 2022. While there he started 30 of 45 games and had 148 tackles and 13.5 sacks. As a junior, Fiske was named second team All-MAC after making 58 tackles (12 for loss) with 6.0 sacks, two forced fumbles and one fumble recovery. After the 2022 season, he entered the transfer portal and transferred to Florida State University. Fiske earned third team AP All-American and second team All-ACC honors as a senior, recording 43 tackles, including 9.0 for loss with 6.0 sacks, and five quarterback hurries for the Seminoles.

== Professional career ==
Pre-draft measurables
Height	Weight	Arm length	Hand span	Wingspan	40-yard dash	10-yard split	20-yard split	20-yard shuttle	Vertical jump	Broad jump	Bench press
6 ft 3 5/8 in (1.92 m)	292 lb (132 kg)	31 in (0.79 m)	9 3/8 in (0.24 m)	6 ft 4 3/4 in (1.95 m)	4.78 s	1.68 s	2.79 s	4.37 s	33.5 in (0.85 m)	9 ft 9 in (2.97 m)	26 reps
All values from NFL Combine

Fiske was selected by the Los Angeles Rams with the 39th overall pick in the second round of the 2024 NFL draft. He played in all 17 regular season games, starting eight and recorded 44 tackles, 8.5 sacks with two forced fumbles and two fumble recoveries. Following the season, Fiske was named to the PFWA All-Rookie Team.

== NFL Career Statistics ==
=== Regular season ===
Year	Team	Games		Tackles					Interceptions						Fumbles			
Year	Team	GP	GS	Comb	Solo	Ast	Sck	TFL	PD	Int	Yds	Avg	Lng	TD	FF	FR	Yds	TD
2024	LAR	17	8	44	20	24	8.5	10	0	0	0	0.0	0	0	2	2	8	0
2025	LAR	17	16	30	11	19	3.0	4	1	0	0	0.0	0	0	0	1	0	0
Career		34	24	74	31	43	11.5	14	1	0	0	0.0	0	0	2	3	8	0

=== Postseason ===
Year	Team	Games		Tackles					Interceptions						Fumbles			
Year	Team	GP	GS	Comb	Solo	Ast	Sck	TFL	PD	Int	Yds	Avg	Lng	TD	FF	FR	Yds	TD
2024	LAR	2	0	2	1	1	1.5	1	0	0	0	0.0	0	0	0	0	0	0
2025	LAR	3	3	8	6	2	2.0	3	0	0	0	0.0	0	0	0	0	0	0
Career		5	3	10	7	3	3.5	4	0	0	0	0.0	0	0	0	0	0	0
