= Christian Rozeboom =

American football player (born 1997)

No. 52 – Tampa Bay Buccaneers
- Position: Linebacker
- Roster status: Injured reserve

Personal information
- Born: January 30, 1997 (age 29); Sioux Center, Iowa, U.S.
- Listed height: 6 ft 2 in (1.88 m)
- Listed weight: 230 lb (104 kg)

Career information
- High school: Sioux Center
- College: South Dakota State (2015–2019)
- NFL draft: 2020: undrafted

Career history
- Los Angeles Rams (2020)*; Kansas City Chiefs (2021); Los Angeles Rams (2021–2024); Carolina Panthers (2025); Tampa Bay Buccaneers (2026–present)
- * Offseason or practice squad member only

Awards and highlights
- Super Bowl champion (LVI); 4× First-team All-MVFC (2016–2019); MVFC Freshman of the Year (2016)

Career NFL statistics as of 2025
- Total tackles: 347
- Sacks: 3.0
- Forced fumbles: 1
- Fumble recoveries: 1
- Pass deflections: 11
- Interceptions: 3
- Stats at Pro Football Reference

Christian Rozeboom (born January 30, 1997) is an American professional football linebacker for the Tampa Bay Buccaneers of the National Football League (NFL). He played college football for the South Dakota State Jackrabbits. He is nicknamed “The Exploding Flower” by Carolina Panthers fans.

== College career ==
Rozeboom was a member of the South Dakota State Jackrabbits for five seasons, redshirting as a true freshman. He finished his collegiate career with a school-record 475 tackles with 29 tackles for loss, six sacks, eight forced fumbles, and eight interceptions.

== Professional career ==
Pre-draft measurables
Height	Weight	Arm length	Hand span	Wingspan
6 ft 2 in (1.88 m)	228 lb (103 kg)	31 7/8 in (0.81 m)	9 1/2 in (0.24 m)	6 ft 4 3/4 in (1.95 m)
All values from Pro Day

=== Los Angeles Rams (first stint) ===
Rozeboom was signed by the Los Angeles Rams as an undrafted free agent on April 26, 2020. He was waived on September 5, 2020, during final roster cuts and re-signed to the team's practice squad the following day. Rozeboom was signed to a reserve/futures contract with the Rams on January 18, 2021. He was waived on August 31, 2021, at the end of training camp.

=== Kansas City Chiefs ===
Rozeboom was signed to the Kansas City Chiefs' practice squad on September 1, 2021. He was elevated to the active roster on October 24, for the team's Week 7 game against the Tennessee Titans and made his NFL debut in the game, primarily playing on special teams. He also recorded his first career tackle in the game.

=== Los Angeles Rams (second stint) ===
On November 2, 2021, Rozeboom was signed off the Chiefs' practice squad by the Rams. Rozeboom won a Super Bowl ring when the Rams defeated the Cincinnati Bengals in Super Bowl LVI.

On March 15, 2023, Rozeboom was tendered by the Rams. He was re-signed on April 17, 2023. He played all 17 games with five starts, finishing fourth on the team with 79 tackles. In the 2024 season, he had one sack, 135 tackles, one interception, and four passes defended.

=== Carolina Panthers ===
On March 12, 2025, Rozeboom signed a one-year contract with the Carolina Panthers. He started 15 games in 2025, recording a team-leading 122 tackles, two sacks, one forced fumble, three pass deflections, and an interception.

=== Tampa Bay Buccaneers ===
On March 24, 2026, Rozeboom signed a one-year, $1.55 million contract with the Tampa Bay Buccaneers.

== NFL career statistics ==
Legend
	Won the Super Bowl
**Bold**	Career high

=== Regular season ===
Year	Team	Games		Tackles					Interceptions						Fumbles				
Year	Team	GP	GS	Cmb	Solo	Ast	Sck	TFL	Int	Yds	Avg	Lng	TD	PD	FF	Fmb	FR	Yds	TD
2021	KC	1	0	1	1	0	0.0	0	0	0	0.0	0	0	0	0	0	0	0	0
2021	LAR	9	0	2	2	0	0.0	0	0	0	0.0	0	0	0	0	0	0	0	0
2022	LAR	17	0	8	3	5	0.0	0	0	0	0.0	0	0	0	0	0	0	0	0
2023	LAR	17	5	79	48	31	0.0	2	**1**	0	0.0	0	0	**4**	0	0	0	0	0
2024	LAR	17	11	**135**	**69**	**66**	1.0	5	**1**	16	16.0	16	0	**4**	0	0	0	0	0
2025	CAR	15	15	122	59	63	**2.0**	**7**	**1**	**20**	**20.0**	**20**	0	3	**1**	0	**1**	0	0
Career		76	31	347	182	165	3.0	14	3	36	12.0	20	0	11	1	0	1	0	0

=== Postseason ===
Year	Team	Games		Tackles					Interceptions						Fumbles				
Year	Team	GP	GS	Cmb	Solo	Ast	Sck	TFL	Int	Yds	Avg	Lng	TD	PD	FF	Fmb	FR	Yds	TD
2021	LAR	4	0	1	1	0	0.0	0	0	0	0.0	0	0	0	0	0	0	0	0
2023	LAR	1	1	4	2	2	0.0	**1**	0	0	0.0	0	0	0	0	0	0	0	0
2024	LAR	2	2	**15**	**11**	**4**	0.0	0	0	0	0.0	0	0	0	0	0	0	0	0
2025	CAR	1	1	9	5	**4**	0.0	0	0	0	0.0	0	0	**1**	0	0	0	0	0
Career		8	4	29	19	10	0.0	1	0	0	0.0	0	0	1	0	0	0	0	0
