= Jordan Whittington =

American football player (born 2000)

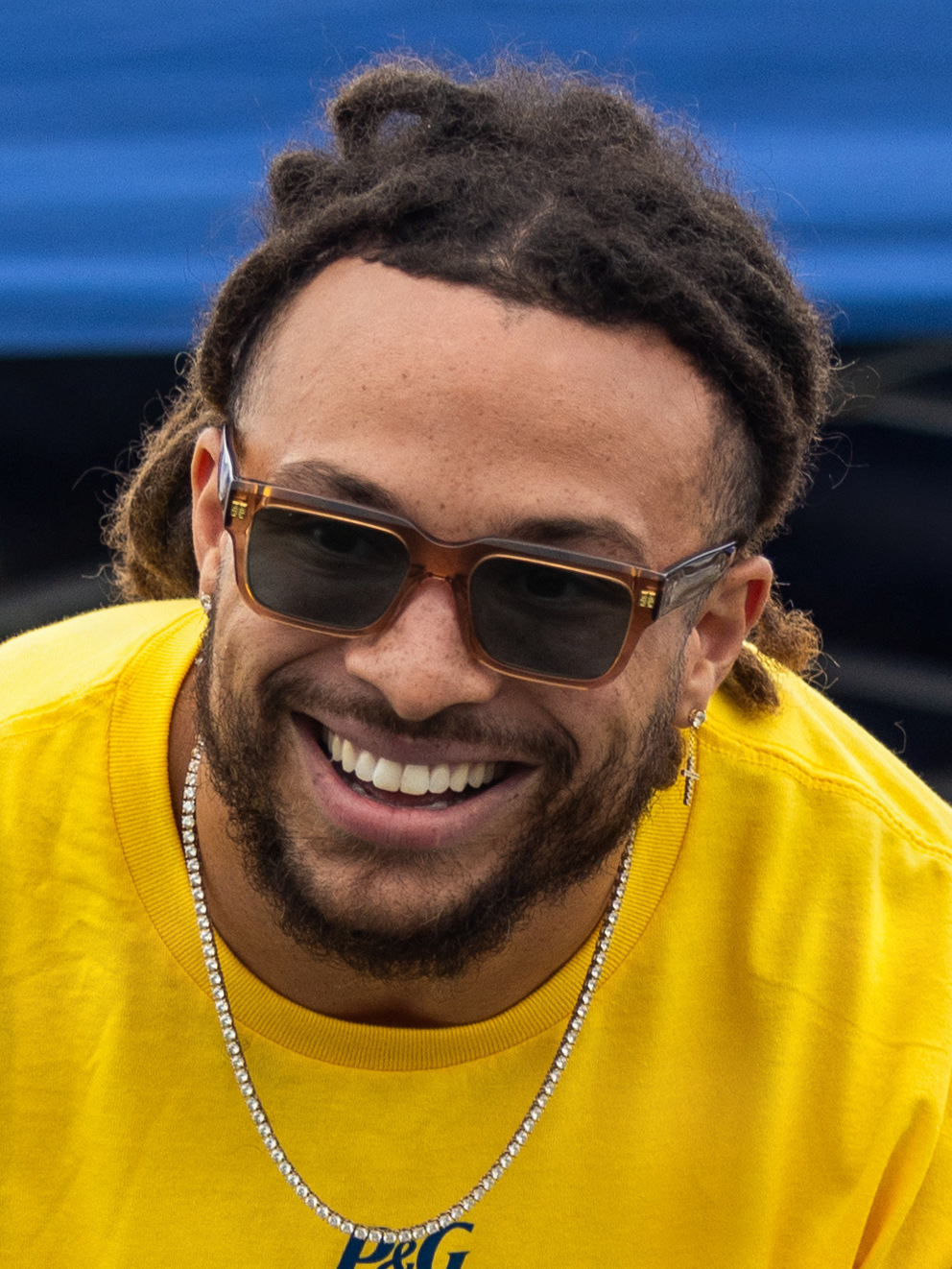
- Whittington in 2026

No. 88 – Los Angeles Rams
- Positions: Wide receiver, kick returner
- Roster status: Injured reserve

Personal information
- Born: October 1, 2000 (age 26); Cuero, Texas, U.S.
- Listed height: 6 ft 1 in (1.85 m)
- Listed weight: 202 lb (92 kg)

Career information
- High school: Cuero
- College: Texas (2019–2023)
- NFL draft: 2024: 6th round, 213th overall pick

Career history
- Los Angeles Rams (2024–present)

Awards and highlights
- PFWA All-Rookie Team (2024)

Career NFL statistics as of Week 8, 2026
- Receptions: 42
- Receiving yards: 476
- Return yards: 1,174
- Rushing yards: 24
- Stats at Pro Football Reference

Jordan Whittington (born October 1, 2000) is an American professional football wide receiver and kick returner for the Los Angeles Rams in the National Football League (NFL). He played college football for the Texas Longhorns.

== Early life ==
Whittington grew up in Cuero, Texas and attended Cuero High School where he lettered in football and basketball. In his high school career, Whittington completed all 14 of his passing attempts for 301 yards and two touchdowns. Whittington would also rush 104 carries for 1,100 yards and 18 touchdowns, while also completing 164 receptions for 3,157 yards and 40 touchdowns. In the 2018 State Championship game, Whittington broke Eric Dickerson's 4A record logging 334 rushing yards in the 40-28 win against defending champs Pleasant Grove at AT&T Stadium. The future Longhorns receiver logged a total of 377 yards with six touchdowns, 11 tackles and one interception. He was named the offensive and defensive MVP in the game. He was rated a four-star recruit and committed to play college football at Texas over offers from schools such as Alabama, Nebraska, Oklahoma, Oregon, TCU, and West Virginia.

== College career ==
During Whittington's true freshman season in 2019, he played in the season opener against Louisiana Tech where he caught two passes for 17 yards before suffering with a torn adductor muscle and was ultimately redshirted.

During the 2020 season, he played in five games and started two of them (the season opener against UTEP and the AT&T Red River Showdown against Oklahoma). After the game against Oklahoma, Whittington sat out for the next three games due to an injury he suffered during that game which required surgery. He finished the season with 21 caught passes for 206 yards and rushed three times for 50 yards and one touchdown.

During the 2021 season, he played in eight games and started three of them. During the Red River Showdown against Oklahoma, he made three receptions for 35 yards and one rush for eight yards before suffering an injury that would have him leave the game and the next four games. He finished the season with 26 caught passes for 377 yards and three touchdowns along with career high records of seven receptions and 113 yards and a 14-yard touchdown reception.

During the 2022 season, he played in 13 games and started 12 of them. He finished the season with 50 receptions for 652 yards and one touchdown along with hauling in three passes for 26 yards and one returned kickoff for 18 yards while playing against Louisiana–Monroe.

Whittington announced that he would be returning for the 2023 season.

== Professional career ==
Pre-draft measurables
Height	Weight	Arm length	Hand span	Wingspan	40-yard dash	10-yard split	20-yard split	20-yard shuttle	Three-cone drill	Vertical jump	Broad jump	Bench press
6 ft 0 5/8 in (1.84 m)	205 lb (93 kg)	30 3/8 in (0.77 m)	10 in (0.25 m)	6 ft 1 5/8 in (1.87 m)	4.47 s	1.55 s	2.62 s	4.12 s	6.80 s	36.0 in (0.91 m)	10 ft 0 in (3.05 m)	18 reps
All values from NFL Combine/Pro Day

Whittington was drafted by the Los Angeles Rams 213th overall in the sixth round of the 2024 NFL draft. As a rookie, he played in 15 games with three starts, catching 22 passes for 293 yards while also serving in special teams. After returning 16 kickoffs for 453 total yards, Whittington was named to the PFWA All-Rookie Team as a kickoff returner. In his second season, Whittington played in all 17 regular season games with six starts, catching 18 passes for 171 yards and returning 17 kickoffs for 434 yards.

== Career statistics ==
Legend
**Bold**	Career high

=== NFL ===
==== Regular season ====
Year	Team	Games		Receiving					Rushing					Kick returns					Fumbles		
Year	Team	GP	GS	Rec	Yds	Avg	Lng	TD	Att	Yds	Avg	Lng	TD	Ret	Yds	Avg	Lng	TD	Fum	Lost	FR
2024	LAR	15	3	**22**	**293**	**13.3**	**50**	0	2	**12**	**6.0**	**7**	0	16	**453**	**28.3**	**43**	0	0	0	**1**
2025	LAR	17	6	18	171	9.5	40	0	**3**	**12**	4.0	6	0	**17**	434	25.5	38	0	0	0	**1**
2026	LAR	3	1	2	12	6.0	8	0	0	0	0.0	0	0	4	94	23.5	31	0	**1**	0	0
Career		35	10	42	476	11.3	50	0	5	24	4.8	7	0	37	981	26.5	43	0	0	0	2

==== Postseason ====
Year	Team	Games		Receiving					Rushing					Kick returns					Fumbles		
Year	Team	GP	GS	Rec	Yds	Avg	Lng	TD	Att	Yds	Avg	Lng	TD	Ret	Yds	Avg	Lng	TD	Fum	Lost	FR
2024	LAR	2	0	1	12	12.0	12	0	0	0	0.0	0	0	2	43	21.5	22	0	0	0	0
2025	LAR	2	1	**2**	**35**	**17.5**	**20**	0	**1**	0	0.0	0	0	**7**	**155**	**22.1**	**25**	0	0	0	0
Career		4	1	3	47	15.7	20	0	1	0	0.0	0	0	9	198	22.0	25	0	0	0	0

=== College ===
Team	Year	Games		Receiving				Rushing		
Team	Year	GP	GS	Rec	Yds	Avg	TD	Att	Yds	TD
2019	Texas	1	0	2	17	8.5	0	0	0	0
2020	Texas	5	2	21	206	9.8	0	**3**	**50**	**1**
2021	Texas	8	3	26	377	**14.5**	**3**	1	8	0
2022	Texas	13	8	**50**	**652**	13.0	1	0	0	0
2023	Texas	14	12	42	505	12.0	1	**3**	18	0
Career		41	25	141	1,757	12.5	5	7	76	1

== Personal life ==
Whittington is the nephew of former NFL running back Arthur Whittington, who played for the Oakland Raiders on their 1980 Super Bowl XV world championship team.
