= Jake Hummel =

American football player (born 1999)

No. 33 – Houston Texans
- Position: Linebacker
- Roster status: Active

Personal information
- Born: January 4, 1999 (age 27); Des Moines, Iowa, U.S.
- Listed height: 6 ft 1 in (1.85 m)
- Listed weight: 235 lb (107 kg)

Career information
- High school: Dowling Catholic (West Des Moines, Iowa)
- College: Iowa State (2017–2021)
- NFL draft: 2022: undrafted

Career history
- Los Angeles Rams (2022–2024); Baltimore Ravens (2025); Houston Texans (2026–present)

Career NFL statistics as of 2025
- Total tackles: 49
- Stats at Pro Football Reference

Jake Hummel (born January 4, 1999) is an American professional football linebacker for the Houston Texans of the National Football League (NFL). He played college football at Iowa State.

== College career ==
Hummel played for the Iowa State Cyclones for five seasons. He finished his collegiate career with 228 tackles, 18 tackles for loss, two sacks, and three interceptions.

== Professional career ==
Pre-draft measurables
Height	Weight	Arm length	Hand span	Wingspan	40-yard dash	10-yard split	20-yard split	20-yard shuttle	Three-cone drill	Vertical jump	Broad jump	Bench press
6 ft 1 7/8 in (1.88 m)	225 lb (102 kg)	32 3/8 in (0.82 m)	10 in (0.25 m)	6 ft 5 1/4 in (1.96 m)	4.51 s	1.56 s	2.55 s	4.30 s	6.83 s	37.0 in (0.94 m)	10 ft 6 in (3.20 m)	21 reps
All values from Pro Day

=== Los Angeles Rams ===
Hummel signed with the Los Angeles Rams as an undrafted free agent on May 5, 2022. During the 2022 preseason, he set the record for most tackles during the preaseason for the LA Rams. He made the Rams' initial 53-man roster out of training camp. He was placed on injured reserve on November 5.

=== Baltimore Ravens ===
On March 13, 2025, Hummel signed with the Baltimore Ravens.

=== Houston Texans ===
On March 10, 2026, Hummel signed a two-year, $4.75 million contract with the Houston Texans.
