= Ethan Evans =

American football player (born 2001)

- Evans with the Los Angeles Rams in 2025

No. 42 – Los Angeles Rams
- Position: Punter
- Roster status: Active

Personal information
- Born: July 19, 2001 (age 25); Mount Airy, North Carolina, U.S.
- Listed height: 6 ft 3 in (1.91 m)
- Listed weight: 253 lb (115 kg)

Career information
- High school: North Surry (Mount Airy)
- College: Wingate (2019–2022)
- NFL draft: 2023: 7th round, 223rd overall pick

Career history
- Los Angeles Rams (2023–present)

Awards and highlights
- First-team Division II All-American (2022); 2× First-team All-SAC (2021, 2022) (punter); First-team All-SAC (2022) (placekicker)

Career NFL statistics as of Week 8, 2026
- Punts: 195
- Punting yards: 9,274
- Punting average: 47.6
- Inside 20: 77
- Longest punt: 72
- Stats at Pro Football Reference

Ethan Gray Evans (born July 19, 2001) is an American professional football punter and kickoff specialist for the Los Angeles Rams of the National Football League (NFL). He played college football for the Wingate Bulldogs and was selected in the seventh round of the 2023 NFL draft by the Rams.

== Early life ==
Evans was born on July 19, 2001, in Mount Airy, North Carolina, and grew up there. He attended North Surry High School and played football and track, additionally being a member of the National Honor Society. He set several school kicking records, including for longest made field goal (51 yards), most career field goals (17) and most career extra points (77). He twice was named the Western Piedmont 2A Conference Specialist of the Year and was invited to the state's East–West All-Star Game after graduating, becoming the first North Surry player to participate in the event in 23 years and only the eighth overall. Evans committed to play college football for the Division II Wingate Bulldogs.

== College career ==
Evans ended up becoming one of the all-time best special teams players at Wingate, in his stint spanning from the 2019 season to 2022. He was their starting punter and handled kickoff duties in all four seasons, additionally handling field goals and extra points as a senior.

Evans had his best season as a senior, posting 67 kickoffs for 4,180 yards with a 62.4 average and 44 touchbacks, and 77 punts for 3,518 yards, averaging 45.69 yards per punt, a total that ranked second-best in the NCAA Division II. He additionally had 39 punts inside the 20 and 30 that went more than 50 yards, and went 10-for-18 on field goals with a long of 41, as well as 43-of-44 on extra points. Evans twice was named the national player of the week by D2Football.com and was named first-team all-conference, all-region, and a D2CCA first-team All-American. He also was named first-team All-American by Associated Press (AP), being one of three Wingate players to earn the honor that year.

Evans finished his career at Wingate having appeared in 39 games and made 186 punts for 8,027 yards (averaging 43.2 yards per punt) with a long of 72 yards. He had 47 fair catches, 53 punts of more than 50 yards and 89 inside the 20-yard line. Additionally, on kickoffs, he posted 213 kicks for 13,230 yards (an average of 62.1) with 120 touchbacks. Evans was invited to the Hula Bowl and was also one of only four Division II players to be chosen for the East–West Shrine Bowl in 2023.

== Professional career ==
Pre-draft measurables
Height	Weight	Arm length	Hand span	Wingspan
6 ft 3 1/2 in (1.92 m)	231 lb (105 kg)	34 7/8 in (0.89 m)	10 1/4 in (0.26 m)	6 ft 10 in (2.08 m)
All values from Pro Day

Evans was selected in the seventh round (223rd overall) of the 2023 NFL draft by the Los Angeles Rams, being the highest-selected Division II player in that draft and only the second Wingate Bulldog after David Jones to ever be drafted.

In Week 11 of the 2023 season, Evans was named National Football Conference Special Teams Player of the Week, the first Ram to be awarded a player of the week recognition in the season. In the 2023 season, Evans had 63 punts for 3,101 yards for a 49.22 average. In the 2024 season, he had 55 punts for 2,530 for a 46.0 average.

In Week 11 of the 2025 season, Evans landed four punts inside the 20-yard line, including one at the one-yard line late in the fourth quarter of a 21-19 win over the Seattle Seahawks, earning NFC Special Teams Player of the Week.

In Week 7 of the 2026 season, Evans stepped in as the Rams' emergency placekicker after an injury to Blake Grupe. He successfully converted an extra point in the fourth quarter.

== NFL career statistics ==
Legend
	Led the league
**Bold**	Career high

=== Regular season ===
Year	Team	GP	Punting							
Year	Team	GP	Punts	Yds	Lng	Avg	Net Avg	Blk	Ins20	RetY
2023	LAR	**17**	**63**	**3,101**	**72**	**49.2**	38.5	**1**	20	**495**
2024	LAR	16	55	2,530	68	46.0	**41.7**	0	**30**	198
2025	LAR	**17**	50	2,315	68	46.3	38.0	0	20	336
Career		50	168	7,946	72	47.3	39.4	1	70	1,029

=== Postseason ===
Year	Team	GP	Punting							
Year	Team	GP	Punts	Yds	Lng	Avg	Net Avg	Blk	Ins20	RetY
2023	LAR	1	2	93	**62**	46.5	34.5	0	1	4
2024	LAR	2	10	508	59	**50.8**	**47.9**	0	**7**	9
2025	LAR	**3**	**14**	**646**	61	46.1	39.0	**1**	**7**	**41**
Career		6	26	1,247	62	48.0	42.0	1	15	54
