= Tutu Atwell =

American football player (born 1999)

No. 8 – Los Angeles Rams
- Position: Wide receiver
- Roster status: Active

Personal information
- Born: October 7, 1999 (age 27); Miami, Florida, U.S.
- Listed height: 5 ft 9 in (1.75 m)
- Listed weight: 165 lb (75 kg)

Career information
- High school: Miami Northwestern (FL)
- College: Louisville (2018–2020)
- NFL draft: 2021: 2nd round, 57th overall pick

Career history
- Los Angeles Rams (2021–2025); Miami Dolphins (2026)*; Los Angeles Rams (2026–present)
- * Offseason or practice squad member only

Awards and highlights
- Super Bowl champion (LVI); First-team All-ACC (2019); Second-team All-ACC (2020)

Career NFL statistics as of Week 10, 2026
- Receptions: 113
- Receiving yards: 1,665
- Receiving touchdowns: 5
- Rushing yards: 72
- Rushing touchdowns: 1
- Stats at Pro Football Reference

Chatarius Antwan "Tutu" Atwell Jr. (born October 7, 1999) is an American professional football wide receiver for the Los Angeles Rams of the National Football League (NFL). He played college football for the Louisville Cardinals and was selected by the Rams in the second round of the 2021 NFL draft.

== Early life ==
Atwell attended Miami Northwestern Senior High School in Miami, Florida. He played quarterback in high school and was a four-year starter. As a senior, he was the Miami-Dade County Player of the Year. Atwell committed to the University of Louisville to play college football.

== College career ==
Atwell was switched to wide receiver at Louisville. As a freshman in 2018, he played in 12 games, recording 24 receptions for 406 yards and two touchdowns. As a sophomore in 2019, he started 11 of 13 games, finishing with 70 receptions for 1,276 yards and 12 touchdowns. The 1,276 yards led the Atlantic Coast Conference and broke Harry Douglas' school record. On December 8, 2020, Atwell announced that he would opt out for the remainder of the 2020 season due to an undisclosed injury. In addition, he decided to forgo his senior year and enter the 2021 NFL draft.

== Professional career ==
Pre-draft measurables
Height	Weight	Arm length	Hand span	Wingspan	40-yard dash	10-yard split	20-yard split	20-yard shuttle	Three-cone drill	Vertical jump	Broad jump
5 ft 8 7/8 in (1.75 m)	155 lb (70 kg)	29 1/4 in (0.74 m)	8 7/8 in (0.23 m)	5 ft 9 3/4 in (1.77 m)	4.39 s	1.49 s	2.60 s	4.09 s	6.87 s	33.0 in (0.84 m)	9 ft 9 in (2.97 m)
All values from Pro Day

=== Los Angeles Rams (first stint) ===
Atwell was selected by the Los Angeles Rams in the second round (57th overall) of the 2021 NFL draft. On May 14, Atwell signed his four-year rookie contract with the Rams. He played in eight games before being placed on injured reserve on November 2, 2021. He finished his rookie year with zero catches and was mainly used as a return specialist, returning 10 punts for 54 yards and five kickoffs for 87 yards. Though he did not play for the remainder of the season, Atwell became a world champion when the Rams defeated the Cincinnati Bengals 23–20 in Super Bowl LVI. In Week 11 of the 2022 season, against the New Orleans Saints, Atwell scored his first professional touchdown on a 62-yard reception, and for the season recorded 18 receptions for 298 receiving yards with one touchdown and added 34 yards and a TD on nine rushes while playing in 13 games with four starts. During the 2023 season, Atwell appeared in 16 games and made 14 starts. In Week 1, he caught six passes for a single-game career-high 119 yards to help the Rams defeat Seattle 30–13, then set a career single-game high with seven receptions (for 77 yards) the following week in a 30–23 loss to San Francisco in Week 2. He finished with 39 receptions for 483 yards and three touchdowns along with five carries for 31 yards on the ground. He scored a 38-yard receiving touchdown in the Rams' Wild Card Round loss to the Detroit Lions. In 2024, Atwell started five out of 17 games and caught 42 passes for 562 yards and had two carries for seven yards but did not score a touchdown during the season. In the playoffs, he caught an 18-yard pass in the Rams' 28–22 loss to Philadelphia in an NFC Divisional Round game.

On March 6, 2025, Atwell signed a one-year, $10 million extension with the Rams. Through the season's first five weeks, Atwell had four receptions for 164 yards, including an 88-yard touchdown catch-and-run in the Rams' 27–20 win over the Indianapolis Colts in Week 4. Bothered by a hamstring injury, Atwell did not play in the Week 6 victory over the Baltimore Ravens or a Week 7 win in London against the Jacksonville Jaguars. On October 27, Atwell was placed on injured reserve by the Rams. He was activated on December 13, ahead of the team's Week 15 matchup against the Detroit Lions and caught one pass for nine yards in the Rams' 41–34 victory. Atwell finished the 2025 season with only six receptions for 196 yards and one touchdown. During the postseason, he was active for the Rams' 34–31 Wild Card Round victory over the Carolina Panthers, but did not make a catch. Atwell was placed on the team's inactive list for L.A.'s final two playoff games.

=== Miami Dolphins ===
On March 12, 2026, Atwell signed a one-year contract with the Miami Dolphins.

=== Los Angeles Rams (second stint) ===
On August 27, 2026, the Dolphins traded Atwell back to the Rams in exchange for running back Jarquez Hunter.

== NFL career statistics ==
Legend
	Led the league
**Bold**	Career high

=== Regular season ===
Year	Team	Games		Receiving					Rushing					Fumbles	
Year	Team	GP	GS	Rec	Yds	Y/R	Lng	TD	Att	Yds	Y/A	Lng	TD	Fum	Lost
2021	LAR	0	0	0	0	0.0	0	0	0	0	0.0	0	0	**1**	0
2022	LAR	13	4	18	298	16.6	62	1	**9**	**34**	3.9	**11**	**1**	0	0
2023	LAR	16	14	39	483	12.4	44	**3**	5	31	**6.2**	22	0	0	0
2024	LAR	17	5	**42**	**562**	13.4	50	0	2	7	3.5	7	0	0	0
2025	LAR	10	4	6	192	**32.0**	**88**	1	0	0	0.0	0	0	0	0
2026	LAR	7	3	8	130	16.3	40	0	0	0	0.0	0	0	0	0
Career		71	20	113	1,665	14.7	88	5	16	72	4.5	22	1	1	0

=== Postseason ===
Year	Team	Games		Receiving					Rushing					Fumbles	
Year	Team	GP	GS	Rec	Yds	Y/R	Lng	TD	Att	Yds	Y/A	Lng	TD	Fum	Lost
2021	LAR	0	0	Did not play due to injury											
2023	LAR	1	0	**1**	**38**	**38.0**	**38**	**1**	—	—	—	—	—	0	0
2024	LAR	2	0	**1**	18	18.0	18	0	—	—	—	—	—	0	0
2025	LAR	1	0	0	0	0.0	0	0	—	—	—	—	—	0	0
Career		4	0	2	56	28.0	38	1	–	–	–	–	–	0	0

== Personal life ==
Atwell's father, Tutu Atwell Sr., was a wide receiver at the University of Minnesota (1994–1997), ranking fourth in career receiving yards and sixth in career touchdowns.
