= Kobie Turner =

American football player (born 1999)

No. 91 – Los Angeles Rams
- Position: Defensive end
- Roster status: Active

Personal information
- Born: April 26, 1999 (age 27); Washington, D.C., U.S.
- Listed height: 6 ft 2 in (1.88 m)
- Listed weight: 294 lb (133 kg)

Career information
- High school: Centreville (Fairfax County, Virginia)
- College: Richmond (2018–2021); Wake Forest (2022)
- NFL draft: 2023: 3rd round, 89th overall pick

Career history
- Los Angeles Rams (2023–present)

Awards and highlights
- PFWA All-Rookie Team (2023); Third-team All-ACC (2022)

Career NFL statistics as of 2025
- Total tackles: 167
- Sacks: 24.0
- Forced fumbles: 1
- Fumble recoveries: 2
- Pass deflections: 9
- Interceptions: 1
- Stats at Pro Football Reference

Kobie Turner (born April 26, 1999) is an American professional football defensive end for the Los Angeles Rams of the National Football League (NFL). He played college football for the Richmond Spiders and Wake Forest Demon Deacons.

== Early life ==
Turner was born on April 26, 1999, in Washington D.C.. Turner attended Centreville High School in Fairfax County, Virginia.

== College career ==
Turner joined the University of Richmond as a walk-on in 2018. He played at Richmond from 2018 to 2021. In 2021, he was named the CAA Co-Defensive Player of the Year. Overall, he played in 37 games with 27 starts and recorded 158 tackles and 15 sacks.

After graduating from Richmond with degrees in music and mathematics, Turner transferred to Wake Forest University in 2022. He finished the year with 38 tackles and two sacks.

== Professional career ==
Pre-draft measurables
Height	Weight	Arm length	Hand span	Wingspan	20-yard shuttle	Three-cone drill	Broad jump	Bench press
6 ft 2 1/4 in (1.89 m)	288 lb (131 kg)	32 in (0.81 m)	10 1/8 in (0.26 m)	6 ft 5 7/8 in (1.98 m)	4.49 s	7.08 s	8 ft 0 in (2.44 m)	31 reps
All values from East–West Shrine Bowl/Pro Day

Turner was selected by the Los Angeles Rams in the third round with the 89th pick of the 2023 NFL draft. In his first season, Turner led all NFL rookie defensive players with 9.0 sacks. He was awarded with the NFL Defensive Rookie of the Month for December. He was named to the PFWA NFL All-Rookie Team at the end of the season and finished third in voting for NFL Defensive Rookie of the Year behind Jalen Carter and winner Will Anderson Jr.

== NFL career statistics ==
Legend
	Led the league
**Bold**	Career high

=== Regular season ===
Year	Team	Games		Tackles						Fumbles				Interceptions			
Year	Team	GP	GS	Cmb	Solo	Ast	Sck	Sfty	TFL	FF	FR	Yds	TD	Int	Yds	TD	PD
2023	LAR	**17**	4	57	29	**28**	**9.0**	—	8	—	—	—	—	—	—	—	2
2024	LAR	**17**	16	**62**	**35**	27	8.0	—	**10**	**1**	**1**	—	—	—	—	—	**4**
2025	LAR	**17**	**17**	48	24	24	7.0	—	9	—	**1**	—	—	**1**	**10**	—	3
Career		51	37	167	88	79	24.0	—	27	1	2	—	—	1	—	—	6

=== Postseason ===
Year	Team	Games		Tackles						Fumbles				Interceptions			
Year	Team	GP	GS	Cmb	Solo	Ast	Sck	Sfty	TFL	FF	FR	Yds	TD	Int	Yds	TD	PD
2023	LAR	1	—	1	—	1	0.5	—	—	—	—	—	—	—	—	—	—
2024	LAR	2	2	**10**	**7**	**3**	**3.0**	—	**4**	—	—	—	—	—	—	—	—
2025	LAR	**3**	**3**	5	3	2	—	—	—	—	—	—	—	—	—	—	—
Career		6	5	16	10	6	3.5	—	4	—	—	—	—	—	—	—	—

== The Masked Singer ==
In 2024, Turner competed in season twelve of The Masked Singer as "Goo" and had Keenan Allen (who competed in season nine as "Gargoyle") serving as his Masked Ambassador. After losing to "Wasp" in the Group B finals ("60s Night"), he was saved when Jenny McCarthy rang the Ding Dong Keep It On Bell. Turner was eliminated in the "Quarterfinals".

== Personal life ==
Turner is known for his singing skills, having run three A cappella groups while in high school, earning him the nickname "The Conductor". He has performed the national anthem at Los Angeles Lakers and Los Angeles Kings games. He also released a single, a cover of "The House of the Rising Sun" by The Animals, a song he covered in the show.
