= 2023 Los Angeles Rams season =

87th season in franchise history

- Owner: Stan Kroenke
- General manager: Les Snead
- Head coach: Sean McVay
- Offensive coordinator: Mike LaFleur
- Defensive coordinator: Raheem Morris
- Home stadium: SoFi Stadium

Results
- Record: 10–7
- Division place: 2nd NFC West
- Playoffs: Lost Wild Card Playoffs (at Lions) 23–24
- All-Pros: DT Aaron Donald (1st team); RB Kyren Williams (2nd team); WR Puka Nacua (2nd team)
- Pro Bowlers: QB Matthew Stafford; RB Kyren Williams; WR Puka Nacua; DT Aaron Donald

Uniform
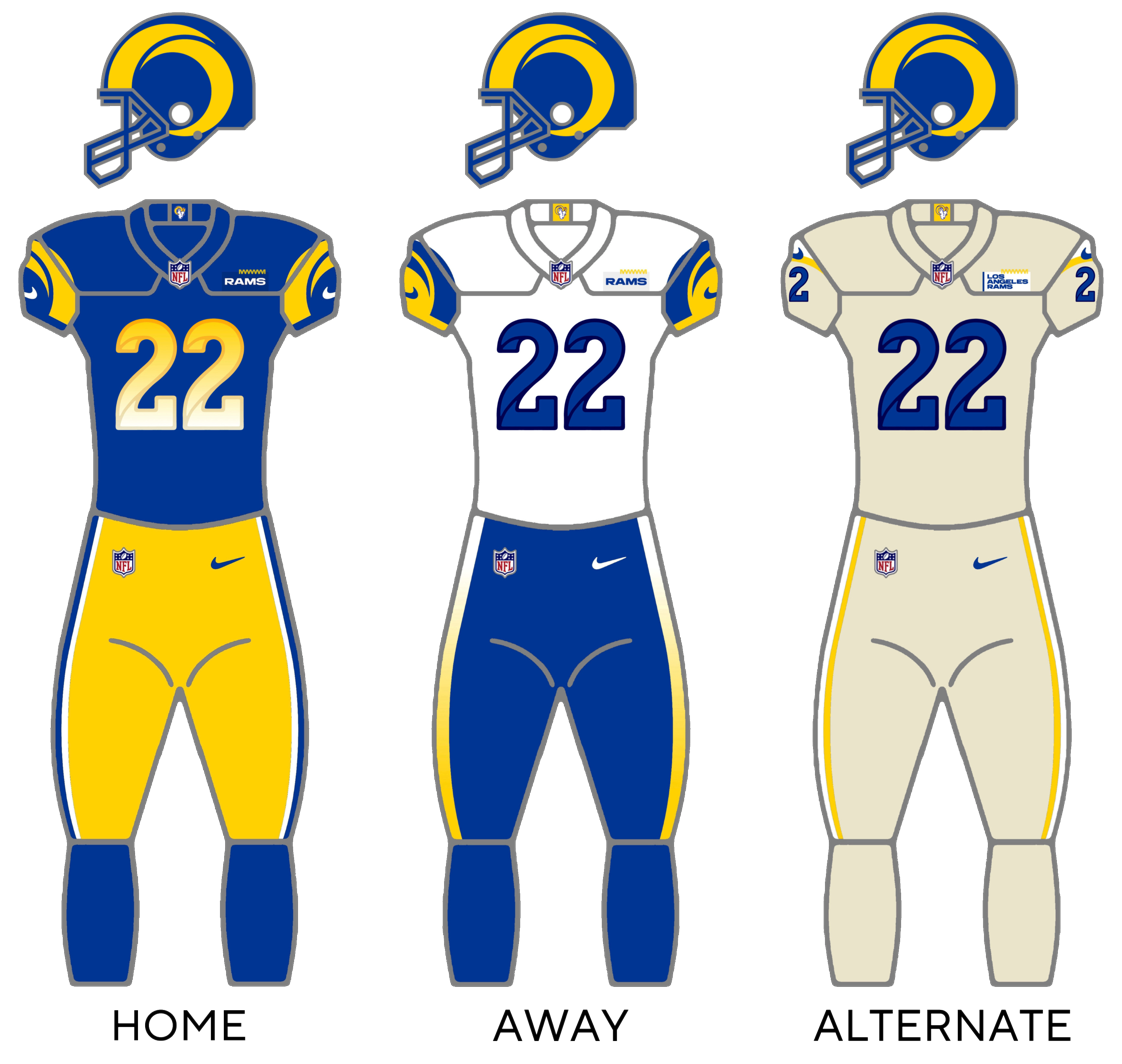

The 2023 season was the Los Angeles Rams' 86th in the National Football League (NFL), their 87th overall, their 57th in the Greater Los Angeles Area, the fourth playing their home games at SoFi Stadium and their seventh under head coach Sean McVay. Despite struggling in the first half of the season, dealing with injuries and a 3–6 record at the midpoint, the Rams went 7–1 in their final eight games, which was five wins more than their injury-plagued season they had the year before after a Week 13 win against the Cleveland Browns. After a close win against the Giants on New Year's Eve, Los Angeles clinched its fifth winning season in six years. A loss from the Seattle Seahawks later that day helped the Rams clinch their return to the playoffs after a one-year absence. In the Wild Card Round, the Rams were defeated by quarterback Matthew Stafford's former team, the Detroit Lions, led by their former quarterback Jared Goff.

For the first time since 2019, Jalen Ramsey was not on their opening day roster, as he was traded in the offseason to the Miami Dolphins for a 2023 third-round draft pick and tight end Hunter Long. The team came to an agreement to part ways with linebacker Bobby Wagner after one season with the Rams before returning to the rival Seattle Seahawks on a one-year contract. This was also the last season with Aaron Donald on the team until his return in the 2026 season.

The Los Angeles Rams drew an average home attendance of 73,150 in eight home games for the 2023 NFL season, the sixth-highest in the league.

== Offseason ==
=== Coaching changes ===
- Following considerable press speculation that he was likely to step away following his first losing season as head coach, Sean McVay announced that he would return in 2023 for his seventh season with the Rams.
- The Rams announced that they were terminating the contracts of several assistants. Among those who were not being retained were offensive line coach Kevin Carberry, defensive backs coach Jonathan Cooley, special teams coordinator Joe DeCamillis, assistant defensive line coach Skyler Jones and defensive assistant Lance Schulters.
- Additionally, offensive coordinator Liam Coen voluntarily resigned to return to the University of Kentucky, where he had previously served as offensive coordinator.
- Former New York Jets offensive coordinator Mike LaFleur was hired by the Rams for the same position. Mike LaFleur's older brother Matt LaFleur, now head coach of the Green Bay Packers, served in the same capacity in 2017, during Sean McVay's first season as Rams head coach.
- Nick Caley, who had spent the previous six seasons as tight ends coach of the New England Patriots, was hired to take on the same role with the Rams.
- Joe Coniglio, who spent one season as Navy's outside linebackers coach rejoined his old college roommate, McVay, as the Rams' outside linebackers coach.

=== Draft ===
2023 Los Angeles Rams draft selections
Round	Selection	Player	Position	College	Notes
1	6	Traded to the Detroit Lions (Note: The Rams traded a first-round selection (6th overall), a 2022 first-round selection, a 2021 third-round selection and QB Jared Goff to the Detroit Lions in exchange for QB Matthew Stafford.)			
2	36	Steve Avila	G	TCU	
3	69	Traded to the Houston Texans (Note: The Rams traded third- and sixth-round selections (69th and 191st overall) to the Houston Texans in exchange for third- and fifth-round selections (73rd and 161st overall).)			
3	73	Traded to the New York Giants (Note: The Rams traded a third-round selection (73rd overall) to the New York Giants in exchange for third- and fourth-round selections (89th and 128th overall).)			From Browns via Texans
3	77	Byron Young	DE	Tennessee	From Patriots via Dolphins (Note: The Los Angeles Rams traded CB Jalen Ramsey to the Miami Dolphins in exchange for a third-round selection (77th overall) and TE Hunter Long.)
3	89	Kobie Turner	DT	Wake Forest	From Giants
4	107	Traded to the New England Patriots (Note: The Rams traded a fourth-round selection (107th overall) and a 2022 sixth-round selection to the New England Patriots in exchange for RB Sony Michel.)			
4	128	Stetson Bennett	QB	Georgia	From Giants
5	140	Traded to the Cleveland Browns (Note: The Rams traded a fifth-round selection (140th overall) to the Cleveland Browns in exchange for CB Troy Hill.)			
5	161	Nick Hampton	LB	Appalachian State	From Cowboys via Texans
5	167	Traded to the Houston Texans (Note: The Rams traded a fifth-round selection (167th overall) to the Houston Texans in exchange for fifth- and seventh-round selections (174th and 259th overall).)			
5	171	Traded to the Tampa Bay Buccaneers (Note: The Rams traded a fifth-round selection (171st overall) to the Tampa Bay Buccaneers in exchange for fifth- and seventh-round selections (175th and 252nd overall).)			
5	174	Warren McClendon	OT	Georgia	From Raiders via Texans
5	175	Davis Allen	TE	Clemson	From Buccaneers
5	177	Puka Nacua	WR	BYU	Compensatory pick
6	182	Tre Tomlinson	CB	TCU	
6	189	Ochaun Mathis	DE	Nebraska	From Titans (Note: The Rams traded WR Robert Woods to the Tennessee Titans in exchange for a sixth-round selection (189th overall).)
6	191	Traded to the Houston Texans			From Packers (Note: The Rams traded a seventh-round selection (235th overall) and P Corey Bojorquez to the Green Bay Packers in exchange for a sixth-round selection (191st overall).)
6	215	Zach Evans	RB	Ole Miss	Compensatory selection; from Commanders via Bills (Note: The Rams traded a seventh-round selection (252nd overall) and a 2024 sixth-round selection to the Buffalo Bills in exchange for a sixth-round selection (215th overall).)
7	223	Ethan Evans	P	Wingate	
7	234	Jason Taylor II	S	Oklahoma State	From Steelers (Note: The Rams traded a seventh-round selection (251st overall) and WR Allen Robinson to the Pittsburgh Steelers in exchange for a seventh-round selection (234th overall).)
7	235	Traded to the Green Bay Packers			From Lions (Note: The Rams traded DT Michael Brockers to the Detroit Lions in exchange for a seventh-round selection (235th overall).)
7	251	Traded to the Pittsburgh Steelers			
7	252	Traded to the Buffalo Bills			From Buccaneers
7	259	Desjuan Johnson	DT	Toledo	From Texans

2023 Los Angeles Rams undrafted free agents
Name	Position	College	Ref.
Kelechi Anyalebechi	MLB	Incarnate Word	
Tanner Brown	K	Oklahoma State	
Braxton Burmeister	WR	San Diego State	
Timarcus Davis	CB	Arizona State	
Tyon Davis	CB	Tulsa	
Collin Duncan	S	Mississippi State	
Christopher Dunn	K	NC State	
Tiyon Evans	RB	Louisville	
Tyler Hudson	WR	Louisville	
Tanner Ingle	S	NC State	
Sam James	WR	West Virginia	
Matthew Jester	OLB	Princeton	
Quindell Johnson	S	Memphis	
Jordan Jones	CB	Rhode Island	
Sean Maginn	C	Wake Forest	
Mike McAllister	C	Youngstown State	
Cameron McCutcheon	CB	Western Carolina	
Grant Miller	G	Baylor	
Christian Sims	TE	Bowling Green	
Ryan Smenda Jr.	MLB	Wake Forest	
Xavier Smith	WR	Florida A&M	
DeAndre Square	MLB	Kentucky	
Rashad Torrence	S	Florida	
Alex Ward	LS	UCF	
Dresser Winn	QB	UT Martin	
Jaiden Woodbey	MLB	Boston College	

Draft trades

== Staff ==
2023 Los Angeles Rams staff
Front office: Owner/CEO – Stan Kroenke; COO/executive vice president of football operations – Kevin Demoff; General manager – Les Snead; Vice president of football administration – Tony Pastoors; Director of football operations – Sophie Harlan; Senior personnel executives – Brian Xanders and Ray Farmer; Senior personnel advisor – Taylor Morton; Director of scouting strategy – James Gladstone; Assistant director of college scouting – Ted Monago; Assistant director of pro scouting – John McKay; Director of draft management – J. W. Jordan; Director of football affairs – Jacques McClendon; Football analyst – Andy Benoit; Head coaches: Head coach – Sean McVay; Assistant head coach – Jimmy Lake; Offensive coaches: Offensive coordinator – Mike LaFleur; Quarterbacks/pass game coordinator – Zac Robinson; Running backs – Ron Gould; Wide receivers – Eric Yarber; Tight ends – Nick Caley; Offensive line – Ryan Wendell; Assistant offensive line – Zak Kromer; Pass game specialist – Jake Peetz; Offensive assistant – KJ Black; Offensive assistant – Nick Jones	Defensive coaches: Defensive coordinator – Raheem Morris; Defensive line/run game coordinator – Eric Henderson; Assistant defensive line – Andrew Carter; Linebackers/pass rush coordinator – Chris Shula; Outside linebackers – Joe Coniglio; Secondary – Chris Beake; Defensive backs/pass game coordinator – Aubrey Pleasant; Defensive assistant – Mike Harris; Special teams coaches: Special teams coordinator – Chase Blackburn; Assistant special teams – Jeremy Springer; Coaching analyst – Tim Berbenich; Strength and conditioning: Director of strength training and performance – Justin Lovett; Assistant strength and conditioning – Fernando Noriega; Assistant strength and conditioning – Dustin Woods

== Final roster ==
2023 Los Angeles Rams roster
Quarterbacks (QB): 9 Matthew Stafford; 11 Carson Wentz; Running backs (RB): 21 Zach Evans; 24 Royce Freeman; 20 Ronnie Rivers; 23 Kyren Williams; Wide receivers (WR): 5 Tutu Atwell; 16 Tyler Johnson; 10 Cooper Kupp; 17 Puka Nacua; 15 Demarcus Robinson; 18 Ben Skowronek; 81 Austin Trammell; Tight ends (TE): 87 Davis Allen; 89 Tyler Higbee; 88 Brycen Hopkins	Offensive linemen (OL): 55 Brian Allen C; 72 Tremayne Anchrum G; 73 Steve Avila G; 69 Kevin Dotson G; 79 Rob Havenstein T; 77 Alaric Jackson T; 71 Warren McClendon T; 70 Joe Noteboom G; 65 Coleman Shelton C; Defensive linemen (DL): 95 Bobby Brown III NT; 99 Aaron Donald DT; 94 Desjuan Johnson DE; 52 Larrell Murchison DT; 91 Kobie Turner NT; 92 Jonah Williams DE	Linebackers (LB): 31 Nick Hampton OLB; 97 Michael Hoecht OLB; 35 Jake Hummel ILB; 53 Ernest Jones ILB; 32 Ochaun Mathis OLB; 59 Troy Reeder ILB; 56 Christian Rozeboom ILB; 96 Keir Thomas OLB; 0 Byron Young OLB; Defensive backs (DB): 14 Cobie Durant CB; 4 Jordan Fuller S; 43 John Johnson S; 1 Derion Kendrick CB; 37 Quentin Lake S; 26 Duke Shelley CB; 25 Jason Taylor II S; 6 Tre Tomlinson CB; 44 Ahkello Witherspoon CB; 2 Russ Yeast S; Special teams (ST): 42 Ethan Evans P; 8 Brett Maher K; 46 Carson Tinker LS	Practice squad: 61 A. J. Arcuri T; 90 Earnest Brown IV DE; 60 Logan Bruss G; 93 Marquise Copeland DT; 98 Cory Durden DT; 54 Olakunle Fatukasi ILB; 82 Miller Forristall TE; 34 Tanner Ingle S; 83 Nikola Kalinic TE; 68 Mike McAllister C; 41 Cameron McCutcheon CB; 22 Michael Ojemudia CB; 19 Xavier Smith WR; 57 Zachary Thomas T; 51 Zach VanValkenburg OLB; 12 Dresser Winn QB; Reserve: 13 Stetson Bennett QB (NF-Ill.); 38 Shaun Jolly CB (IR); 84 Hunter Long TE (IR); 47 Alex Ward LS (IR); Rookies in italics

== Preseason ==
The Rams' preseason opponents were announced on May 11, 2023, along with the release of the NFL's regular season schedule.

Week	Date	Opponent	Result	Record	Venue	Recap
1	August 12	Los Angeles Chargers	L 17–34	0–1	SoFi Stadium	Recap
2	August 19	Las Vegas Raiders	L 17–34	0–2	SoFi Stadium	Recap
3	August 26	at Denver Broncos	L 0–41	0–3	Empower Field at Mile High	Recap

== Regular season ==
=== Schedule ===
Week	Date	Opponent	Result	Record	Venue	Recap
1	September 10	at **Seattle Seahawks**	**W** 30–13	1–0	Lumen Field	Recap
2	September 17	**San Francisco 49ers**	**L** 23–30	1–1	SoFi Stadium	Recap
3	September 25	at Cincinnati Bengals	**L** 16–19	1–2	Paycor Stadium	Recap
4	October 1	at Indianapolis Colts	**W** 29–23 (OT)	2–2	Lucas Oil Stadium	Recap
5	October 8	Philadelphia Eagles	**L** 14–23	2–3	SoFi Stadium	Recap
6	October 15	**Arizona Cardinals**	**W** 26–9	3–3	SoFi Stadium	Recap
7	October 22	Pittsburgh Steelers	**L** 17–24	3–4	SoFi Stadium	Recap
8	October 29	at Dallas Cowboys	**L** 20–43	3–5	AT&T Stadium	Recap
9	November 5	at Green Bay Packers	**L** 3–20	3–6	Lambeau Field	Recap
10	Bye					
11	November 19	**Seattle Seahawks**	**W** 17–16	4–6	SoFi Stadium	Recap
12	November 26	at **Arizona Cardinals**	**W** 37–14	5–6	State Farm Stadium	Recap
13	December 3	Cleveland Browns	**W** 36–19	6–6	SoFi Stadium	Recap
14	December 10	at Baltimore Ravens	**L** 31–37 (OT)	6–7	M&T Bank Stadium	Recap
15	December 17	Washington Commanders	**W** 28–20	7–7	SoFi Stadium	Recap
16	December 21	New Orleans Saints	**W** 30–22	8–7	SoFi Stadium	Recap
17	December 31	at New York Giants	**W** 26–25	9–7	MetLife Stadium	Recap
18	January 7	at **San Francisco 49ers**	**W** 21–20	10–7	Levi's Stadium	Recap

Note: Intra-division opponents are in bold text.

=== Game summaries ===
==== Week 1: at Seattle Seahawks ====
Week 1: Los Angeles Rams at Seattle Seahawks – Game summary

Quarter	1	2	3	4	Total
**Rams**	7	0	10	13	**30**
Seahawks	3	10	0	0	**13**

at Lumen Field, Seattle, Washington

- Date: September 10
- Game time: 1:25 p.m. PDT
- Game weather: Mostly cloudy, 72 °F (22 °C)
- Game attendance: 68,683
- Referee: Shawn Smith
- TV announcers (Fox): Kevin Kugler, Mark Sanchez and Laura Okmin
- Recap, Game Book

Game information

**First quarter**

- SEA – Jason Myers 36-yard field goal, 9:52. Seahawks 3–0. **Drive: 12 plays, 57 yards, 5:08.**
- LAR – Kyren Williams 1-yard run (Brett Maher kick), 0:39. Rams 7–3. **Drive: 16 plays, 75 yards, 9:13.**

**Second quarter**

- SEA – DK Metcalf 10-yard pass from Geno Smith (Jason Myers kick), 9:16. Seahawks 10–7. **Drive: 12 plays, 75 yards, 6:23.**
- SEA – Jason Myers 42-yard field goal, 4:18. Seahawks 13–7. **Drive: 6 plays, 28 yards, 2:46.**

**Third quarter**

- LAR – Kyren Williams 7-yard run (Brett Maher kick), 8:56. Rams 14–13. **Drive: 10 plays, 76 yards, 6:04.**
- LAR – Brett Maher 38-yard field goal, 2:39. Rams 17–13. **Drive: 9 plays, 60 yards, 5:14.**

**Fourth quarter**

- LAR – Cam Akers 1-yard run (Brett Maher kick), 9:45. Rams 24–13. **Drive: 14 plays, 79 yards, 6:19.**
- LAR – Brett Maher 54-yard field goal, 4:57. Rams 27–13. **Drive: 9 plays, 40 yards, 4:12.**
- LAR – Brett Maher 45-yard field goal, 0:11. Rams 30–13. **Drive: 9 plays, 32 yards, 3:05.**

**Top passers**

- LAR – Matthew Stafford – 24/38, 334 yards
- SEA – Geno Smith – 16/26, 112 yards, TD

**Top rushers**

- LAR – Kyren Williams – 15 rushes, 52 yards, 2 TD
- SEA – Kenneth Walker III – 12 rushes, 64 yards

**Top receivers**

- LAR – Tutu Atwell – 6 receptions, 119 yards
- SEA – DK Metcalf – 3 receptions, 47 yards, TD

The Rams won in a season opener for the sixth time in seven seasons under head coach Sean McVay, defeating the host Seahawks for the third time in the team's last four visits to Lumen Field. Trailing 13–7 at halftime, Los Angeles dominated in the third and fourth quarters as linebacker Ernest Jones had a team-high nine total tackles including three tackles for loss, while Jordan Fuller added eight tackles from his safety position. Defensive tackle Aaron Donald was credited with four tackles and a half-sack in his first game back from injury as the Rams defense held Seattle to just a single first down and 12 total offensive yards in the second half. Also returning to the starting lineup, quarterback Matthew Stafford completed 24 of 38 passes for 334 yards, while wide receivers Tutu Atwell (six receptions) and rookie Puka Nacua (10 receptions) both had 119 yards receiving in place of the injured Cooper Kupp. Second-year running back Kyren Williams led the Rams in rushing with 52 yards on 15 carries with two touchdowns while fellow running back Cam Akers added 29 yards on 22 carries with a rushing TD. Kicker Brett Maher made his debut for the Rams, converting three field goals and three PATs. Offensively, the Rams rolled to 426 yards in total offense without committing a turnover or giving up a sack. With the upset win, the Rams started their season 1–0.

==== Week 2: vs. San Francisco 49ers ====
Week 2: San Francisco 49ers at Los Angeles Rams – Game summary

Quarter	1	2	3	4	Total
**49ers**	7	10	3	10	**30**
Rams	3	14	0	6	**23**

at SoFi Stadium, Inglewood, California

- Date: September 17
- Game time: 1:05 p.m. PDT
- Game weather: Cloudy, 71 °F (22 °C) (fixed roof)
- Game attendance: 74,742
- Referee: Brad Allen
- TV announcers (Fox): Kevin Kugler, Mark Sanchez and Laura Okmin
- Recap, Game Book

Game information

**First quarter**

- SF – Christian McCaffrey 14-yard run (Jake Moody kick), 8:25. 49ers 7–0. **Drive: 11 plays, 75 yards, 6:35.**
- LAR – Brett Maher 43-yard field goal, 1:54. 49ers 7–3. **Drive: 11 plays, 50 yards, 6:31.**

**Second quarter**

- SF – Jake Moody 27-yard field goal, 13:32. 49ers 10–3. **Drive: 7 plays, 66 yards, 3:22.**
- LAR – Kyren Williams 6-yard pass from Matthew Stafford (Brett Maher kick), 9:49. Tied 10–10. **Drive: 8 plays, 60 yards, 3:43.**
- LAR – Kyren Williams 4-yard run (Brett Maher kick), 1:45. Rams 17–10. **Drive: 13 plays, 88 yards, 5:17.**
- SF – Brock Purdy 1-yard run (Jake Moody kick), 0:00. Tied 17–17. **Drive: 7 plays, 75 yards, 1:45.**

**Third quarter**

- SF – Jake Moody 57-yard field goal, 1:21. 49ers 20–17. **Drive: 6 plays, 33 yards, 2:49.**

**Fourth quarter**

- SF – Deebo Samuel 11-yard run (Jake Moody kick), 11:28. 49ers 27–17. **Drive: 7 plays, 74 yards, 3:52.**
- LAR – Brett Maher 48-yard field goal, 7:13. 49ers 27–20. **Drive: 14 plays, 45 yards, 4:15.**
- SF – Jake Moody 26-yard field goal, 2:59. 49ers 30–20. **Drive: 4 plays, 7 yards, 1:49.**
- LAR – Brett Maher 38-yard field goal, 0:00. 49ers 30–23. **Drive: 11 plays, 50 yards, 1:34.**

**Top passers**

- SF – Brock Purdy – 17/25, 206 yards
- LAR – Matthew Stafford – 34/55, 307 yards, TD, 2 INT

**Top rushers**

- SF – Christian McCaffrey – 20 rushes, 116 yards, TD
- LAR – Kyren Williams – 14 rushes, 52 yards, TD

**Top receivers**

- SF – Deebo Samuel – 6 receptions, 63 yards
- LAR – Puka Nacua – 15 receptions, 147 yards

The Rams stayed close to but ultimately could not overcome the visiting 49ers, losing to San Francisco for the ninth consecutive time in the regular season. Playing in its home opener, Los Angeles seized a 17–10 lead in the second quarter as running back Kyren Williams scored twice, once on a 6-yard touchdown pass from quarterback Matthew Stafford and then again on a 4-yard TD run with 1:45 remaining before intermission. But the 49ers rallied to tie the score on the final play of the first half, as San Francisco quarterback Brock Purdy scored on a quarterback sneak as time expired. Stafford completed 34 of 55 passes for 307 yards but had two interceptions in the second half, both of which led to field goals by 49ers kicker Jake Moody. Rams wide receiver Puka Nacua set an NFL rookie record for most receptions in a single game with 15 receptions (breaking the previous record of 14 shared by four players) for 147 yards. Linebacker Ernest Jones led the Rams' defensive effort with 10 total tackles. Kicker Brett Maher converted all three of his field goal attempts, the last a 38-yarder on the game's final play.

==== Week 3: at Cincinnati Bengals ====
Week 3: Los Angeles Rams at Cincinnati Bengals – Game summary

Quarter	1	2	3	4	Total
Rams	3	3	3	7	**16**
**Bengals**	0	6	10	3	**19**

at Paycor Stadium, Cincinnati, Ohio

- Date: September 25
- Game time: 8:15 p.m. EDT/5:15 p.m. PDT
- Game weather: Mostly clear, 71 °F (22 °C)
- Game attendance: 65,158
- Referee: John Hussey
- TV announcers (KCOP/ESPN): Chris Fowler, Louis Riddick, Dan Orlovsky and Laura Rutledge
- Recap, Game Book

Game information

**First quarter**

- LAR – Brett Maher 30-yard field goal, 8:22. Rams 3–0. **Drive: 8 plays, 43 yards, 3:04.**

**Second quarter**

- CIN – Evan McPherson 49-yard field goal, 12:55. Tied 3–3. **Drive: 12 plays, 48 yards, 6:27.**
- LAR – Brett Maher 23-yard field goal, 9:49. Rams 6–3. **Drive: 7 plays, 70 yards, 3:06.**
- CIN – Evan McPherson 53-yard field goal, 0:00. Tied 6–6. **Drive: 6 plays, 26 yards, 1:13.**

**Third quarter**

- LAR – Brett Maher 42-yard field goal, 10:37. Rams 9–6. **Drive: 7 plays, 51 yards, 4:23.**
- CIN – Joe Mixon 14-yard run (Evan McPherson kick), 5:34. Bengals 13–9. **Drive: 10 plays, 75 yards, 5:03.**
- CIN – Evan McPherson 48-yard field goal, 3:09. Bengals 16–9. **Drive: 6 plays, 48 yards, 1:48.**

**Fourth quarter**

- CIN – Evan McPherson 54-yard field goal, 7:13. Bengals 19–9. **Drive: 4 plays, 5 yards, 1:33.**
- LAR – Tutu Atwell 1-yard pass from Matthew Stafford (Brett Maher kick), 1:03. Bengals 19–16. **Drive: 10 plays, 61 yards, 2:31.**

**Top passers**

- LAR – Matthew Stafford – 18/33, 269 yards, TD, 2 INT
- CIN – Joe Burrow – 26/49, 259 yards, INT

**Top rushers**

- LAR – Kyren Williams – 10 rushes, 38 yards
- CIN – Joe Mixon – 19 rushes, 65 yards, TD

**Top receivers**

- LAR – Puka Nacua – 5 receptions, 72 yards
- CIN – Ja'Marr Chase – 12 receptions, 141 yards

Meeting in the regular season for the first time since Super Bowl LVI, the Rams fell to the host Bengals on Monday Night Football. After trading two field goals each in a 6–6 first half, Los Angeles got its only lead on kicker Brett Maher's 42-yard field goal, his third of the evening. But Cincinnati then scored 13 unanswered points, taking the lead on a 14-yard touchdown run by running back Joe Mixon and two more field goals from kicker Evan McPherson. The Rams closed to within a field goal as wide receiver Tutu Atwell scored on a 1-yard pass from quarterback Matthew Stafford with 2:31 remaining. Playing in only his third career game, wide receiver Puka Nacua had five receptions for 72 yards. Stafford threw for 269 yards and a score, but was intercepted twice and sacked six times as the offensive line had to shuffle its lineup due to injuries. Defensive tackle Aaron Donald had eight tackles including a sack while cornerback Ahkello Witherspoon recorded the team's first interception of the season in the loss.

==== Week 4: at Indianapolis Colts ====
Week 4: Los Angeles Rams at Indianapolis Colts – Game summary

Quarter	1	2	3	4	OT	Total
**Rams**	14	6	3	0	6	**29**
Colts	0	0	8	15	0	**23**

at Lucas Oil Stadium, Indianapolis, Indiana

- Date: October 1
- Game time: 1:00 p.m. EDT/10:00 a.m. PDT
- Game weather: None (retractable roof closed)
- Game attendance: 65,337
- Referee: Land Clark
- TV announcers (Fox): Kenny Albert, Jonathan Vilma and Shannon Spake
- Recap, Game Book

Game information

**First quarter**

- LAR – Kyren Williams 3-yard run (Brett Maher kick), 11:35. Rams 7–0. **Drive: 8 plays, 75 yards, 3:25.**
- LAR – Kyren Williams 3-yard run (Brett Maher kick), 1:45. Rams 14–0. **Drive: 10 plays, 94 yards, 4:38.**

**Second quarter**

- LAR – Brett Maher 40-yard field goal, 12:52. Rams 17–0. **Drive: 7 plays, 38 yards, 4:40.**
- LAR – Brett Maher 54-yard field goal, 5:48. Rams 20–0. **Drive: 10 plays, 50 yards, 5:29.**

**Third quarter**

- LAR – Brett Maher 51-yard field goal, 7:17. Rams 23–0. **Drive: 9 plays, 38 yards, 5:25.**
- IND – Mo Alie-Cox 35-yard pass from Anthony Richardson (Anthony Richardson–Zack Moss pass), 5:26. Rams 23-8. **Drive: 4 plays, 75 yards, 1:51.**

**Fourth quarter**

- IND - Anthony Richardson 1 yard run (Matt Gay kick), 11:45. Rams 23-15. **Drive: 6 plays, 62 yards, 2:31.**
- IND - Drew Ogletree 5-yard pass from Anthony Richardson (Anthony Richardson–Michael Pittman pass), 1:56. Tied 23-23. **Drive: 13 plays, 83 yards, 5:33.**

**Overtime**

- LAR - Puka Nacua 22-yard pass from Matthew Stafford, 5:49. Rams 29-23. **Drive: 8 plays, 75 yards, 4:11.**

**Top passers**

- LAR – Matthew Stafford – 27/40, 319 yards, TD, INT
- IND – Anthony Richardson – 11/25, 200 yards, TD

**Top rushers**

- LAR – Kyren Williams – 25 rushes, 103 yards, 2 TDs
- IND – Zack Moss – 18 rushes, 70 yards

**Top receivers**

- LAR – Puka Nacua – 9 receptions, 163 yards, TD
- IND – Drew Ogletree – 3 receptions, 48 yards, TD

Rookie wide receiver Puka Nacua continued a prolific season start with nine receptions for 163 yards, including a 22-yard catch for his first NFL touchdown to beat the Colts in overtime. The Rams scored on their first four possessions of the game and held a 23–0 lead midway through the third quarter as running back Kyren Williams scored on a pair of 3-yard touchdown runs, while kicker Brett Maher converted three field goals. But Maher missed on two other field goal attempts as the Colts fought back on the strength of rookie quarterback Anthony Richardson, who passed for 200 yards and two TDs (while also throwing a pair of successful conversion passes) and ran for 56 yards and another score. Indianapolis tied the game 23–23 with just under two minutes remaining in regulation to force overtime. Having won the coin toss and electing to receive, the Rams marched 75 yards in eight plays as quarterback Matthew Stafford led the team despite visibly limping. On the game's final play, Stafford connected with Nacua over the middle at the Colts' 8-yard line, and the rookie wide receiver weaved his way through a pair of defenders for the game-winning score. Defensively, linebacker Ernest Jones had a team-high 10 tackles while defensive tackle Aaron Donald had four, with both players recording sacks.

==== Week 5: vs. Philadelphia Eagles ====
Week 5: Philadelphia Eagles at Los Angeles Rams – Game summary

Quarter	1	2	3	4	Total
**Eagles**	7	10	0	6	**23**
Rams	7	7	0	0	**14**

at SoFi Stadium, Inglewood, California

- Date: October 8
- Game time: 1:05 p.m. PDT
- Game weather: Sunny, 71 °F (22 °C) (fixed roof)
- Game attendance: 74,935
- Referee: Bill Vinovich
- TV announcers (Fox): Kevin Burkhardt, Greg Olsen, Erin Andrews and Tom Rinaldi
- Recap, Game Book

Game information

**First quarter**

- PHI – Dallas Goedert 6-yard pass from Jalen Hurts (Jake Elliott kick), 8:37. Eagles 7–0. **Drive: 12 plays, 75 yards, 6:23.**
- LAR – Tutu Atwell 3-yard pass from Matthew Stafford (Brett Maher kick), 2:01. Tied 7–7. **Drive: 14 plays, 75 yards, 6:36.**

**Second quarter**

- PHI – Jake Elliott 34-yard field goal, 2:15. Eagles 10–7. **Drive: 15 plays, 56 yards, 8:24.**
- LAR – Puka Nacua 22-yard pass from Matthew Stafford (Brett Maher kick), 0:32. Rams 14–10. **Drive: 6 plays, 75 yards, 1:43.**
- PHI – Jalen Hurts 1-yard run (Jake Elliott kick), 0:00. Eagles 17–14. **Drive: 4 plays, 75 yards, 0:32.**

**Third quarter**

- No scoring plays.

**Fourth quarter**

- PHI – Jake Elliott 26-yard field goal, 12:29. Eagles 20–14. **Drive: 17 plays, 83 yards, 8:09.**
- PHI – Jake Elliott 26-yard field goal, 4:06. Eagles 23–14. **Drive: 10 plays, 72 yards, 5:49.**

**Top passers**

- PHI – Jalen Hurts – 25/38, 303 yards, TD, INT
- LAR – Matthew Stafford – 21/37, 222 yards, 2 TD

**Top rushers**

- PHI – Jalen Hurts – 15 rushes, 72 yards, TD
- LAR – Kyren Williams – 14 rushes, 53 yards

**Top receivers**

- PHI – A. J. Brown – 6 receptions, 127 yards
- LAR – Cooper Kupp – 8 receptions, 118 yards

Wide receiver Cooper Kupp was strong in his return to the field, but the host Rams lost for the second time at home, giving up a late TD in the first half and were held scoreless afterward against the undefeated Eagles. Both teams started the game by driving 75 yards to score on their opening possessions, with quarterback Matthew Stafford throwing to wide receiver Tutu Atwell for a 3-yard touchdown to tie the score 7–7. After Philadelphia took a 10–7 lead with 2:15 remaining in the second quarter, Los Angeles responded with a six-play, 75-yard drive that ended as Stafford connected with rookie wide receiver Puka Nacua for a 22-yard go-ahead touchdown that came with 0:32 left. However, the Eagles retaliated quickly behind quarterback Jalen Hurts, who found wide receiver A. J. Brown for a 38-yard gain. Rams cornerback Derion Kendrick was flagged for a horse-collar tackle and pass interference, and those back-to-back penalties put the Eagles on the goal line, with Hurts taking back the lead for the Eagles on a 1-yard run as time ran out in the first half. Though the Eagles only scored in the second half on a pair of 26-yard field goals by kicker Jake Elliott in the fourth quarter, Philadelphia controlled the rest of the game, dominating on time of possession (37:55 to 22:05) and limiting the Rams to just 81 yards in total offense after halftime. Kupp, who had not played since Week 10 of the 2022 season, caught eight passes for 118 yards while Nacua had seven catches for 71 yards and a score. Though Stafford completed 21 of 37 passes for 222 yards and two scores, he was sacked four times in the second half and the Rams were held to just 53 yards rushing. Cornerback Ahkello Witherspoon recorded a turnover for the third straight game with an interception of a Hurts pass in the end zone, while linebacker Ernest Jones led the team with 15 total tackles (10 solo) with three tackles for loss as the Rams fell to 2–3.

==== Week 6: vs. Arizona Cardinals ====
Week 6: Arizona Cardinals at Los Angeles Rams – Game summary

Quarter	1	2	3	4	Total
Cardinals	3	6	0	0	**9**
**Rams**	3	3	10	10	**26**

at SoFi Stadium, Inglewood, California

- Date: October 15
- Game time: 1:25 p.m. PDT
- Game weather: Sunny, 82 °F (28 °C) (fixed roof)
- Game attendance: 71,202
- Referee: Ronald Torbert
- TV announcers (Fox): Kenny Albert, Jonathan Vilma and Shannon Spake
- Recap, Game Book

Game information

**First quarter**

- ARI – Matt Prater 55-yard field goal, 11:25. Cardinals 3–0. **Drive: 8 plays, 38 yards, 3:35.**
- LAR – Brett Maher 29-yard field goal 0:11. Tied 3–3. **Drive: 6 plays, 48 yards, 1:56.**

**Second quarter**

- ARI – Matt Prater 32-yard field goal, 12:35. Cardinals 6–3. **Drive: 4 plays, 3 yards, 0:52.**
- ARI – Matt Prater 27-yard field goal, 0:43. Cardinals 9–3. **Drive: 11 plays, 63 yards, 4:22.**
- LAR – Brett Maher 35-yard field goal, 0:04. Cardinals 9–6. **Drive: 5 plays, 58 yards, 0:39.**

**Third quarter**

- LAR – Cooper Kupp 13-yard pass from Matthew Stafford (Brett Maher kick), 8:57. Rams 13–9. **Drive: 10 plays, 75 yards, 6:03.**
- LAR – Brett Maher 25-yard field goal, 2:44. Rams 16–9. **Drive: 8 plays, 80 yards, 4:31.**

**Fourth quarter**

- LAR – Kyren Williams 5-yard run (Brett Maher kick), 8:19. Rams 23–9. **Drive: 12 plays, 88 yards, 6:35.**
- LAR – Brett Maher 43-yard field goal, 4:37. Rams 26–9. **Drive: 4 plays, 8 yards, 1:38.**

**Top passers**

- ARI – Joshua Dobbs – 21/41, 235 yards, INT
- LAR – Matthew Stafford – 15/24, 226 yards, TD

**Top rushers**

- ARI – Joshua Dobbs – 7 rushes, 47 yards
- LAR – Kyren Williams – 20 rushes, 158 yards, TD

**Top receivers**

- ARI – Trey McBride – 4 receptions, 62 yards
- LAR – Cooper Kupp – 7 receptions, 148 yards, TD

Running back Kyren Williams ran for 158 yards on 20 carries as the Rams seized control in the second half to win their first home game of the season. After totaling just five rushing yards on three carries in the first and second quarters, Los Angeles received the kickoff after halftime and proceeded to march down the field with nine consecutive run plays that totaled 62 yards down to the Arizona 13. From there, quarterback Matthew Stafford threw a touchdown pass to wide receiver Cooper Kupp to take a lead that L.A. would never relinquish. Following a Cardinals punt, Stafford's 30-yard pass to wide receiver Tutu Atwell and Williams' 31-yard run down to the Arizona 11 led to a field goal by kicker Brett Maher. The Cardinals then mounted their best offensive drive of the game, reaching the Los Angeles 12 before linebacker Christian Rozeboom got his first career interception. The Rams then drove 88 yards in 12 plays with Williams capping it off with a 5-yard TD run that was initially ruled a fumble and touchback but reversed following an instant replay review. Linebacker Byron Young ended Arizona's next possession with a sack of Cardinals quarterback Joshua Dobbs and a forced fumble which he recovered himself that led to Maher's fourth field goal to complete the day's scoring. The Rams defense held Arizona in check with just 27 rushing yards allowed after halftime. Stafford passed for 226 yards and a score while Kupp led his team with seven receptions for 148 yards and his first TD of the season as L.A. improved its record to 3–3.

==== Week 7: vs. Pittsburgh Steelers ====
Week 7: Pittsburgh Steelers at Los Angeles Rams – Game summary

Quarter	1	2	3	4	Total
**Steelers**	0	3	7	14	**24**
Rams	0	9	8	0	**17**

at SoFi Stadium, Inglewood, California

- Date: October 22
- Game time: 1:05 p.m. PDT
- Game weather: Sunny, 74 °F (23 °C) (fixed roof)
- Game attendance: 73,471
- Referee: Craig Wrolstad
- TV announcers (Fox): Adam Amin, Daryl Johnston and Pam Oliver
- Recap, Game Book

Game information

**First quarter**

- No scoring plays.

**Second quarter**

- PIT – Chris Boswell 53-yard field goal, 14:51. Steelers 3–0. **Drive: 8 plays, 22 yards, 3:44.**
- LAR – Brett Maher 41-yard field goal 5:56. Tied 3–3. **Drive: 8 plays, 38 yards, 4:11.**
- LAR – Tutu Atwell 31-yard pass from Matthew Stafford (kick failed), 0:17. Rams 9–3. **Drive: 8 plays, 88 yards, 3:29.**

**Third quarter**

- PIT – Kenny Pickett 1-yard run (Chris Boswell kick), 13:19. Steelers 10–9. **Drive: 3 plays, 7 yards, 1:25.**
- LAR – Darrell Henderson 1-yard run (Matthew Stafford–Cooper Kupp pass), 8:57. Rams 17–10. **Drive: 9 plays, 75 yards, 4:22.**

**Fourth quarter**

- PIT – Jaylen Warren 13-yard run (Chris Boswell kick), 13:49. Tied 17–17. **Drive: 5 plays, 59 yards, 2:33.**
- PIT – Najee Harris 3-yard run (Chris Boswell kick), 7:20. Steelers 24–17. **Drive: 10 plays, 80 yards, 5:16.**

**Top passers**

- PIT – Kenny Pickett – 17/25, 230 yards
- LAR – Matthew Stafford – 14/29, 231 yards, TD, INT

**Top rushers**

- PIT – Najee Harris – 14 rushes, 53 yards, TD
- LAR – Darrell Henderson – 18 rushes, 61 yards, TD

**Top receivers**

- PIT – George Pickens – 5 receptions, 107 yards
- LAR – Puka Nacua – 8 receptions, 154 yards

Wide receiver Puka Nacua had eight receptions for 154 yards, but the Rams faded in the second half against the visiting Steelers to fall to 3–4. Following a scoreless first quarter, Los Angeles came back from a 3–0 deficit with a 41-yard field goal by placekicker Brett Maher, who later failed to convert an extra point after wide receiver Tutu Atwell caught a 31-yard scoring pass from quarterback Matthew Stafford just 17 seconds before halftime for a 9–3 lead. On the first play of the third quarter, Stafford threw an interception to Steelers defensive end T. J. Watt, who returned it 24 yards to L.A.'s 7-yard line. Three plays later, quarterback Kenny Pickett's 1-yard TD run put Pittsburgh back in the lead 10–9. The Rams responded with a nine-play, 75-yard drive that was capped by a 1-yard touchdown run by running back Darrell Henderson, who led the Rams on the ground with 61 yards on 18 carries after being signed as a free agent when starter Kyren Williams was placed on injured reserve. Stafford converted a pass to wide receiver Cooper Kupp for a two-point conversion to give the Rams a 17–10 advantage. But the Steelers rallied for two touchdowns in the fourth quarter and L.A. was denied a final chance to come back when Pittsburgh's Pickett converted on a fourth-and-1 play after a highly questionable spot of the ball. Defensive end Michael Hoecht led the Rams with seven tackles including two sacks in the loss, the franchise's fifth straight to Pittsburgh dating back to 2003.

==== Week 8: at Dallas Cowboys ====
Week 8: Los Angeles Rams at Dallas Cowboys – Game summary

Quarter	1	2	3	4	Total
Rams	3	6	8	3	**20**
**Cowboys**	17	16	3	7	**43**

at AT&T Stadium, Arlington, Texas

- Date: October 29
- Game time: 12:00 p.m. CDT/10:00 a.m. PDT
- Game weather: None (retractable roof closed)
- Game attendance: 93,448
- Referee: Adrian Hill
- TV announcers (Fox): Kevin Burkhardt, Greg Olsen, Erin Andrews and Tom Rinaldi
- Recap, Game Book

Game information

**First quarter**

- DAL – Jake Ferguson 18-yard pass from Dak Prescott (Brandon Aubrey kick), 9:44. Cowboys 7–0. **Drive: 10 plays, 75 yards, 5:16.**
- LAR – Lucas Havrisik 33-yard field goal, 5:22. Cowboys 7–3. **Drive: 10 plays, 60 yards, 4:22.**
- DAL – Brandon Aubrey 58-yard field goal, 0:43. Cowboys 10–3. **Drive: 9 plays, 35 yards, 4:39.**
- DAL – DaRon Bland 30-yard interception return (Brandon Aubrey kick), 0:36. Cowboys 17–3.

**Second quarter**

- DAL – Punt blocked by Sam Williams out of bounds in end zone for a Safety, 13:39. Cowboys 19–3.
- DAL – CeeDee Lamb 10-yard pass from Dak Prescott (Brandon Aubrey kick), 12:45. Cowboys 26–3. **Drive: 2 plays, 13 yards, 0:54.**
- DAL – CeeDee Lamb 22-yard pass from Dak Prescott (Brandon Aubrey kick), 2:27. Cowboys 33–3. **Drive: 5 plays, 63 yards, 2:41.**
- LAR – Royce Freeman 1-yard run (pass failed), 0:04. Cowboys 33–9. **Drive: 12 plays, 75 yards, 2:23.**

**Third quarter**

- LAR – Ben Skowronek 20-yard pass from Matthew Stafford (Tutu Atwell–Matthew Stafford pass), 11:29. Cowboys 33–17. **Drive: 7 plays, 75 yards, 3:31.**
- DAL – Brandon Aubrey 27-yard field goal, 1:32. Cowboys 36–17. **Drive: 17 plays, 75 yards, 9:57.**

**Fourth quarter**

- DAL – Brandin Cooks 25-yard pass from Dak Prescott (Brandon Aubrey kick), 12:19. Cowboys 43–17. **Drive: 3 plays, 54 yards, 1:00.**
- LAR – Lucas Havrisik 47-yard field goal, 5:31. Cowboys 43–20. **Drive: 7 plays, 25 yards, 2:48.**

**Top passers**

- LAR – Matthew Stafford – 13/22, 162 yards, TD, INT
- DAL – Dak Prescott – 25/31, 304 yards, 4 TD, INT

**Top rushers**

- LAR – Royce Freeman – 9 rushes, 44 yards, TD
- DAL – Tony Pollard – 12 rushes, 53 yards

**Top receivers**

- LAR – Tyler Higbee – 5 receptions, 45 yards
- DAL – CeeDee Lamb – 12 receptions, 158 yards, 2 TD

Traveling to AT&T Stadium, the Rams were dominated throughout by the Cowboys to fall to 3–5 on the season. Dallas quarterback Dak Prescott threw for 304 yards and four touchdowns to lead the Cowboys to a 33–3 lead late in the second period. Rams quarterback Matthew Stafford passed for 162 yards and a touchdown to wide receiver Ben Skowronek in the third quarter, but earlier threw a costly interception to Dallas cornerback DaRon Bland, who returned it 30 yards for a first quarter touchdown. Stafford also made a diving catch of a pass from Tutu Atwell on a two-point conversion play following his TD pass to Skowronek, but was injured on the play and knocked out of the game. Defensively, linebacker Ernest Jones led the Rams with eight total tackles, while safety Jordan Fuller had six tackles and an interception, and defensive tackle Aaron Donald added four tackles including a pair of sacks on Prescott. Running back Royce Freeman ran for 44 yards and a touchdown, while tight end Tyler Higbee caught five passes for 45 yards in L.A.'s loss.

==== Week 9: at Green Bay Packers ====
Week 9: Los Angeles Rams at Green Bay Packers – Game summary

Quarter	1	2	3	4	Total
Rams	0	3	0	0	**3**
**Packers**	0	7	3	10	**20**

at Lambeau Field, Green Bay, Wisconsin

- Date: November 5
- Game time: 12:00 p.m. CST/10:00 a.m. PST
- Game weather: Cloudy, 51 °F (11 °C)
- Game attendance: 77,409
- Referee: Clete Blakeman
- TV announcers (Fox): Adam Amin, Daryl Johnston and Pam Oliver
- Recap, Game Book

Game information

**First quarter**

- No scoring plays.

**Second quarter**

- GB – Aaron Jones 3-yard run (Anders Carlson kick), 14:19. Packers 7–0. **Drive: 7 plays, 41 yards, 4:05.**
- LAR – Lucas Havrisik 52-yard field goal, 1:42. Packers 7–3. **Drive: 13 plays, 56 yards, 5:46.**

**Third quarter**

- GB – Anders Carlson 26-yard field goal, 2:10. Packers 10–3. **Drive: 7 plays, 53 yards, 4:19.**

**Fourth quarter**

- GB – Anders Carlson 34-yard field goal, 9:08. Packers 13–3. **Drive: 7 plays, 34 yards, 4:15.**
- GB – Luke Musgrave 20-yard pass from Jordan Love (Anders Carlson kick), 3:41. Packers 20–3. **Drive: 8 plays, 72 yards, 4:45.**

**Top passers**

- LAR – Brett Rypien – 13/28, 130 yards, INT
- GB – Jordan Love – 20/26, 228 yards, TD

**Top rushers**

- LAR – Royce Freeman – 12 rushes, 32 yards
- GB – Aaron Jones – 20 rushes, 73 yards, TD

**Top receivers**

- LAR – Cooper Kupp – 2 receptions, 48 yards
- GB – Dontayvion Wicks – 4 receptions, 49 yards

Playing at Lambeau Field for the fourth time in as many years, the Rams lost their third straight game. Kicker Lucas Havrisik, who was signed after Los Angeles had cut Brett Maher two weeks earlier, converted a 52-yard field goal for the Rams' only points of the game. Quarterback Brett Rypien, starting in place of the injured Matthew Stafford, threw for 130 yards and an interception in an ineffective performance, while Royce Freeman had 32 rushing yards as the Rams offense was held to a season-low 187 total net yards. On defense, rookie defensive tackle Byron Young had 10 total tackles including two sacks, while fellow rookie Kobie Turner also had 10 tackles and added a sack from his nose tackle position as the Rams' record fell to 3–6 on the season.

==== Week 11: vs. Seattle Seahawks ====
Week 11: Seattle Seahawks at Los Angeles Rams – Game summary

Quarter	1	2	3	4	Total
Seahawks	7	6	3	0	**16**
**Rams**	0	7	0	10	**17**

at SoFi Stadium, Inglewood, California

- Date: November 19
- Game time: 1:25 p.m. PST
- Game weather: Sunny, 72 °F (22 °C) (fixed roof)
- Game attendance: 72,704
- Referee: Carl Cheffers
- TV announcers (CBS): Andrew Catalon, Tiki Barber, Matt Ryan and AJ Ross
- Recap, Game Book

Game information

**First quarter**

- SEA – DK Metcalf 8-yard pass from Geno Smith (Jason Myers kick), 5:20. Seahawks 7–0. **Drive: 14 plays, 88 yards, 7:46.**

**Second quarter**

- SEA – Jason Myers 54-yard field goal, 8:26. Seahawks 10–0. **Drive: 15 plays, 62 yards, 8:34.**
- SEA – Jason Myers 43-yard field goal, 4:48. Seahawks 13–0. **Drive: 6 plays, 43 yards, 3:06.**
- LAR – Puka Nacua 4-yard pass from Matthew Stafford (Lucas Havrisik kick), 0:09. Seahawks 13–7. **Drive: 9 plays, 75 yards, 4:39.**

**Third quarter**

- SEA – Jason Myers 52-yard field goal, 8:03. Seahawks 16–7. **Drive: 8 plays, 13 yards, 3:56.**

**Fourth quarter**

- LAR – Darrell Henderson 1-yard run (Lucas Havrisik kick), 7:38. Seahawks 16–14. **Drive: 9 plays, 68 yards, 4:45.**
- LAR – Lucas Havrisik 22-yard field goal, 1:31. Rams 17–16. **Drive: 14 plays, 75 yards, 5:12.**

**Top passers**

- SEA – Geno Smith – 22/34, 233 yards, TD
- LAR – Matthew Stafford – 17/31, 190 yards, TD, INT

**Top rushers**

- SEA – Zach Charbonnet – 15 rushes, 47 yards
- LAR – Royce Freeman – 17 rushes, 73 yards

**Top receivers**

- SEA – Zach Charbonnet – 6 receptions, 22 yards
- LAR – Puka Nacua – 5 receptions, 70 yards, TD

Trailing 13–0 in the second quarter, the Rams battled back to take a late lead, then held on to earn a season sweep of the Seahawks. Returning to the starting lineup, quarterback Matthew Stafford led Los Angeles on a nine-play, 75-yard drive that ended with a 4-yard touchdown pass to rookie wide receiver Puka Nacua with nine seconds left in the first half. Nacua had a team-high five receptions for 70 yards while running back Royce Freeman added 73 yards on 17 carries and Darrell Henderson scored on a 1-yard run midway through the fourth quarter to cut the Seahawks' lead to within two points, 16–14. L.A.'s defensive effort was once again led by middle linebacker Ernest Jones, who had a team-high 12 tackles and combined with outside linebacker Byron Young for a sack of Seahawks quarterback Geno Smith, who was forced out of the game late in the third quarter. Cornerback Derion Kendrick intercepted a pass by Seattle backup QB Drew Lock, and the Rams pounded out a 13-play drive down to the Seattle 4. From there, rookie kicker Lucas Havrisik converted a 22-yard field goal with 1:34 remaining. The Seahawks tried to rally behind Smith, who drove his team down to the Rams 37-yard line. From there, Seattle kicker Jason Myers, who had converted from 54, 43, and 52 yards earlier in the game, missed from 55 yards with three seconds left and L.A. ran out the clock to end a three-game losing streak. Rookie punter Ethan Evans, who averaged 52.6 yards per punt across five punts with a long of 65, was named NFC Special Teams Player of the Week for Week 11.

==== Week 12: at Arizona Cardinals ====
Week 12: Los Angeles Rams at Arizona Cardinals – Game summary

Quarter	1	2	3	4	Total
**Rams**	7	14	3	13	**37**
Cardinals	8	0	0	6	**14**

at State Farm Stadium, Glendale, Arizona

- Date: November 26
- Game time: 2:05 p.m. MST/1:05 p.m. PST
- Game weather: None (retractable roof closed)
- Game attendance: 62,177
- Referee: Shawn Smith
- TV announcers (Fox): Chris Myers, Robert Smith and Jen Hale
- Recap, Game Book

Game information

**First quarter**

- LAR – Tyler Higbee 7-yard pass from Matthew Stafford (Lucas Havrisik kick), 11:18. Rams 7–0. **Drive: 9 plays, 75 yards, 3:42.**
- ARI – Kyler Murray 2-yard run (Clayton Tune run), 4:50. Cardinals 8–7. **Drive: 12 plays, 75 yards, 6:28.**

**Second quarter**

- LAR – Tyler Higbee 5-yard pass from Matthew Stafford (Lucas Havrisik kick), 9:57. Rams 14–8. **Drive: 8 plays, 51 yards, 4:57.**
- LAR – Kyren Williams 15-yard pass from Matthew Stafford (Lucas Havrisik kick), 0:59. Rams 21–8. **Drive: 4 plays, 48 yards, 0:57.**

**Third quarter**

- LAR – Lucas Havrisik 24-yard field goal, 7:33. Rams 24–8. **Drive: 7 plays, 72 yards, 3:49.**

**Fourth quarter**

- LAR – Kyren Williams 3-yard pass from Matthew Stafford (Lucas Havrisik kick), 12:41. Rams 31–8. **Drive: 13 plays, 54 yards, 7:22.**
- LAR – Royce Freeman 23-yard run (kick failed), 8:19. Rams 37–8. **Drive: 5 plays, 38 yards, 3:01.**
- ARI – Greg Dortch 6-yard pass from Kyler Murray (pass failed), 5:12. Rams 37–14. **Drive: 10 plays, 75 yards, 3:07.**

**Top passers**

- LAR – Matthew Stafford – 25/33, 229 yards, 4 TD, INT
- ARI – Kyler Murray – 27/45, 256 yards, TD

**Top rushers**

- LAR – Kyren Williams – 16 rushes, 143 yards
- ARI – James Conner – 6 rushes, 27 yards

**Top receivers**

- LAR – Tutu Atwell – 3 receptions, 76 yards
- ARI – Marquise Brown – 6 receptions, 88 yards

The Rams turned in their most dominant performance of the season, combining for 457 yards (229 passing, 228 rushing) in total offense while winning at Arizona for the ninth straight time dating back to 2015. L.A. head coach Sean McVay improved his lifetime record against the Cardinals to 13–2 with the victory. Returning to the starting lineup after four weeks on injured reserve, running back Kyren Williams had a spectacular performance, running for 143 yards on 16 carries and catching six passes for 61 yards and two touchdowns and was named NFC Offensive Player of the Week. Quarterback Matthew Stafford completed 25 of 33 pass attempts for 229 yards and a season-high four touchdown passes, with two of those going to tight end Tyler Higbee, who caught five passes for 29 yards. Running back Royce Freeman added 77 yards on 13 carries, including a 23-yard touchdown run in the fourth quarter and wide receiver Tutu Atwell caught three passes for 76 yards. The Rams defense corralled Cardinals quarterback Kyler Murray with constant pressure. Rookie nose tackle Kobie Turner had two of L.A.'s four sacks as the Rams won back-to-back games for the first time since early in the 2022 season.

==== Week 13: vs. Cleveland Browns ====
Week 13: Cleveland Browns at Los Angeles Rams – Game summary

Quarter	1	2	3	4	Total
Browns	7	3	3	6	**19**
**Rams**	10	3	7	16	**36**

at SoFi Stadium, Inglewood, California

- Date: December 3
- Game time: 1:25 p.m. PST
- Game weather: Cloudy, 67 °F (19 °C) (fixed roof)
- Game attendance: 72,887
- Referee: John Hussey
- TV announcers (Fox): Kevin Kugler, Mark Sanchez and Laura Okmin
- Recap, Game Book

Game information

**First quarter**

- CLE – Jerome Ford 24-yard pass from Joe Flacco (Dustin Hopkins kick), 10:18. Browns 7–0. **Drive: 9 plays, 75 yards, 4:42.**
- LAR – Lucas Havrisik 44-yard field goal, 6:28. Browns 7–3. **Drive: 7 plays, 49 yards, 3:50.**
- LAR – Puka Nacua 70-yard pass from Matthew Stafford (Lucas Havrisik kick), 3:59. Rams 10–7. **Drive: 2 plays, 79 yards, 0:49.**

**Second quarter**

- CLE – Dustin Hopkins 40-yard field goal, 2:06. Tied 10–10. **Drive: 7 plays, 58 yards, 2:31.**
- LAR – Lucas Havrisik 28-yard field goal, 0:00. Rams 13–10. **Drive: 13 plays, 66 yards, 2:06.**

**Third quarter**

- CLE – Dustin Hopkins 24-yard field goal, 4:58. Tied 13–13. **Drive: 15 plays, 74 yards, 7:34.**
- LAR – Demarcus Robinson 7-yard pass from Matthew Stafford (Lucas Havrisik kick), 0:39. Rams 20–13. **Drive: 7 plays, 75 yards, 4:19.**

**Fourth quarter**

- CLE – Harrison Bryant 8-yard pass from Joe Flacco (kick failed), 8:49. Rams 20–19. **Drive: 13 plays, 75 yards, 6:50.**
- LAR – Cooper Kupp 3-yard pass from Matthew Stafford (Lucas Havrisik kick), 3:48. Rams 27–19. **Drive: 5 plays, 24 yards, 2:44.**
- LAR – Kyren Williams 1-yard run (Lucas Havrisik kick), 1:56. Rams 34–19. **Drive: 5 plays, 30 yards, 0:33.**
- LAR – Joe Flacco sacked by Aaron Donald in end zone for a safety, 0:36. Rams 36–19.

**Top passers**

- CLE – Joe Flacco – 23/44, 258 yards, 2 TD, INT
- LAR – Matthew Stafford – 22/37, 279 yards, 3 TD

**Top rushers**

- CLE – Kareem Hunt – 12 rushes, 48 yards
- LAR – Kyren Williams – 21 rushes, 88 yards, TD

**Top receivers**

- CLE – Elijah Moore – 4 receptions, 83 yards
- LAR – Puka Nacua – 4 receptions, 105 yards, TD

In a critical contest for both teams, Los Angeles defeated the visiting Browns to improve to 6–6. Cleveland struck first by taking the opening kickoff and driving 75 yards in nine plays to finish with a 24-yard touchdown pass from veteran backup quarterback Joe Flacco to running back Jerome Ford. The Rams responded by scoring on their next two drives to take a 10–7 lead, first with kicker Lucas Havrisik booting a 44-yard field goal, then after forcing a Browns punt, quarterback Matthew Stafford found rookie wide receiver Puka Nacua deep down the middle. Nacua caught the pass in stride and outran the Cleveland defenders for a 70-yard touchdown pass to give L.A. its first lead of the game. Nacua, who surpassed 1,000 receiving yards for the season in only 12 games, had four receptions for 105 yards (his fifth 100-yard receiving game of the season) as well as two carries for 34 yards on the ground. After the Browns and Rams traded punts and field goals in the second quarter, Cleveland took its first possession of the second half and drove down to the L.A. 6-yard-line. But the Rams defense stiffened and forced the Browns to settle for a 24-yard field goal by Dustin Hopkins. The Rams retook the lead on the following drive, as a 31-yard run by Nacua and a 30-yard pass from Stafford to wide receiver Demarcus Robinson set up a first-and-goal at the Browns 10. Two plays later, Stafford and Robinson connected again for a 7-yard touchdown pass and a 20–13 lead. Cleveland responded by putting together another methodical and time-consuming drive that ended with an 8-yard touchdown pass from Flacco to tight end Harrison Bryant, but the extra point attempt from kicker Hopkins sailed wide right, thus allowing the Rams to maintain a slim 20–19 lead. The Browns forced the Rams to punt on the next possession, but on the very first play of Cleveland's ensuing drive, Flacco threw a long pass that was intercepted by former Brown John Johnson, who returned the interception 42 yards to Cleveland's 24-yard line. It took the Rams five plays to score as Stafford (22–37, 279 yards, 0 INTs) threw his third TD pass of the day, a 3-yard strike to wide receiver Cooper Kupp that gave L.A. an eight-point lead. Starting from their own 30, the Browns failed to move the chains after four tries, turning over the ball on downs with 2:29 remaining. Running back Kyren Williams (21 carries, 88 yards) ran the ball four straight times, with his last carry scoring from one yard out with two minutes remaining. The Rams defense punctuated the win in the final seconds as Flacco was sacked at the one by rookie nose tackle Kobie Turner on third down. Backed into his own end zone, Flacco was then sacked on fourth down by both Turner and defensive tackle Aaron Donald for the game's final points as the Rams won three straight games for the first time since their Super Bowl-winning season and remained a contender in the NFC playoff race. The victory also propelled the Rams to second place in the division as they held the tiebreaker against the Seattle Seahawks.

==== Week 14: at Baltimore Ravens ====
Week 14: Los Angeles Rams at Baltimore Ravens – Game summary

Quarter	1	2	3	4	OT	Total
Rams	3	17	2	9	0	**31**
**Ravens**	7	10	3	11	6	**37**

at M&T Bank Stadium, Baltimore, Maryland

- Date: December 10
- Game time: 1:00 p.m. EST/10:00 a.m. PST
- Game weather: Rain, 57 °F (14 °C)
- Game attendance: 70,492
- Referee: Scott Novak
- TV announcers (Fox): Joe Davis, Daryl Johnston and Pam Oliver
- Recap, Game Book

Game information

**First quarter**

- LAR –Lucas Havrisik 27-yard field goal, 5:35. Rams 3–0. **Drive: 13 plays, 67 yards, 6:01.**
- BAL – Isaiah Likely 54-yard pass from Lamar Jackson (Justin Tucker kick), 0:25. Ravens 7–3. **Drive: 3 plays, 66 yards, 1:29.**

**Second quarter**

- LAR – Cooper Kupp 6-yard pass from Matthew Stafford (Lucas Havrisik kick), 12:01. Rams 10–7. **Drive: 7 plays, 75 yards, 3:24.**
- BAL – Odell Beckham Jr. 46-yard pass from Lamar Jackson (Justin Tucker kick), 9:40. Ravens 14–10. **Drive: 5 plays, 75 yards, 2:21.**
- LAR – Davis Allen 7-yard pass from Matthew Stafford (Lucas Havrisik kick), 5:00. Rams 17–14. **Drive: 9 plays, 75 yards, 4:40.**
- LAR – Lucas Havrisik 51-yard field goal, 1:45. Rams 20–14. **Drive: 7 plays, 18 yards, 3:01.**
- BAL – Justin Tucker 31-yard field goal, 0:09. Rams 20–17. **Drive: 12 plays, 62 yards, 1:36.**

**Third quarter**

- BAL – Justin Tucker 47-yard field goal, 10:02. Tied 20–20. **Drive: 8 plays, 49 yards, 3:32.**
- LAR - Tyler Linderbaum fumble out of bounds in end zone for a safety, 5:54. Rams 22–20.

**Fourth quarter**

- BAL – Justin Tucker 33-yard field goal, 11:17. Ravens 23–22. **Drive: 12 plays, 65 yards, 5:48.**
- LAR – Demarcus Robinson 5-yard pass from Matthew Stafford (pass failed), 4:41. Rams 28–23. **Drive: 8 plays, 85 yards, 3:20.**
- BAL – Zay Flowers 21-yard pass from Lamar Jackson (Lamar Jackson-Zay Flowers pass), 1:16. Ravens 31–28. **Drive: 13 plays, 75 yards, 1:09.**
- LAR – Lucas Havrisik 36-yard field goal, 0:07. Tied 31–31. **Drive: 7 plays, 57 yards, 1:09.**

**Overtime**

- BAL – Tylan Wallace 76-yard punt return, 7:42. Ravens 37–31.

**Top passers**

- LAR – Matthew Stafford – 23/41, 294 yards, 3 TD
- BAL – Lamar Jackson – 24/43, 316 yards, 3 TD, INT

**Top rushers**

- LAR – Kyren Williams – 25 rushes, 114 yards
- BAL – Lamar Jackson – 11 rushes, 70 yards

**Top receivers**

- LAR – Cooper Kupp – 8 receptions, 115 yards, TD
- BAL – Odell Beckham Jr. – 4 receptions, 97 yards, TD

In a wild back-and-forth contest that had eight lead changes during regulation, the Rams fell to the host Ravens in overtime. Facing the NFL's top-rated defense, Los Angeles rolled up over 400 yards in total offense and took an early lead on a 27-yard field goal by Lucas Havrisik. But after a trade of punts, Baltimore reclaimed the lead near the end of the opening quarter on the first of three touchdown passes by quarterback Lamar Jackson. The Rams responded quickly as wide receiver Cooper Kupp caught a 6-yard TD pass from quarterback Matthew Stafford. The Ravens retook the lead as Jackson threw a 46-yard score to former Rams wideout Odell Beckham Jr., who was playing against his former team for the first time. Stafford then came back to lead an 11-play, 75-yard drive that ended with the Rams QB finding backup tight end Davis Allen for a 7-yard touchdown. An interception of Jackson by cornerback Ahkello Witherspoon led to a 51-yard field goal by Havrisik and a 20–14 lead. Two Justin Tucker field goals tied the score at 20–20 in the third quarter, but an errant snap by the Ravens was kicked out of the end zone by Jackson for a safety and 22–20 Rams advantage. But a third Tucker field goal put Baltimore on top again. Stafford (294 yards passing) threw his third TD pass of the game, a 5-yard strike to Demarcus Robinson, who had formerly played for the Ravens. But Baltimore rallied with Jackson's third touchdown pass of this game, this one 21 yards to wide receiver Zay Flowers, and the same combination connected for a two-point conversion and a 31–28 lead. With 1:16 remaining in the fourth quarter, the Rams drove from their own 25 to the Baltimore 18 where Havrisik converted a 36-yard field goal with 11 seconds left in regulation. Neither team could score on their first offensive possessions, but disaster struck as Ethan Evans' 50-yard punt was fielded by Ravens return man Tylan Wallace, who evaded numerous Rams tacklers and returned the kick 76 yards for the game-winning touchdown. Rams running back Kyren Williams had 114 yards on 25 carries. Linebacker Ernest Jones had a team-high 10 tackles including a sack for the Rams in the loss, which broke a three-game win streak.

==== Week 15: vs. Washington Commanders ====
Week 15: Washington Commanders at Los Angeles Rams – Game summary

Quarter	1	2	3	4	Total
Commanders	0	0	7	13	**20**
**Rams**	3	10	7	8	**28**

at SoFi Stadium, Inglewood, California

- Date: December 17
- Game time: 1:05 p.m. PST
- Game weather: Cloudy, 78 °F (26 °C) (fixed roof)
- Game attendance: 72,035
- Referee: Alan Eck
- TV announcers (CBS): Tom McCarthy, James Lofton, Jay Feely and Tiffany Blackmon
- Recap, Game Book

Game information

**First quarter**

- LAR – Lucas Havrisik 22-yard field goal, 7:39. Rams 3–0. **Drive: 11 plays, 77 yards, 6:32.**

**Second quarter**

- LAR – Kyren Williams 1-yard run (Lucas Havrisik kick), 2:19. Rams 10–0. **Drive: 10 plays, 53 yards, 5:11.**
- LAR – Lucas Havrisik 27-yard field goal, 0:03. Rams 13–0. **Drive: 6 plays, 6 yards, 0:31.**

**Third quarter**

- LAR – Cooper Kupp 62-yard pass from Matthew Stafford (Lucas Havrisik kick), 14:07. Rams 20–0. **Drive: 2 plays, 75 yards, 0:53.**
- WAS – Curtis Samuel 19-yard pass from Sam Howell (Joey Slye kick), 6:25. Rams 20–7. **Drive: 7 plays, 48 yards, 2:48.**

**Fourth quarter**

- LAR – Demarcus Robinson 23-yard pass from Matthew Stafford (Kyren Williams run), 13:25. Rams 28–7. **Drive: 5 plays, 51 yards, 1:51.**
- WAS – Terry McLaurin 29-yard pass from Jacoby Brissett (Joey Slye kick), 7:17. Rams 28–14. **Drive: 5 plays, 67 yards, 1:48.**
- WAS – Curtis Samuel 3-yard pass from Jacoby Brissett (kick blocked), 1:46. Rams 28–20. **Drive: 9 plays, 65 yards, 3:17.**

**Top passers**

- WAS – Jacoby Brissett – 8/10, 124 yards, 2 TD
- LAR – Matthew Stafford – 25/33, 258 yards, 2 TD

**Top rushers**

- WAS – Chris Rodriguez Jr. – 10 rushes, 35 yards
- LAR – Kyren Williams – 27 rushes, 152 yards, TD

**Top receivers**

- WAS – Terry McLaurin – 6 receptions, 141 yards, TD
- LAR – Cooper Kupp – 8 receptions, 111 yards, TD

The Rams moved closer to a playoff berth, holding off a late Washington rally to improve to 7–7 on the season. Running back Kyren Williams rushed for 152 yards including a 1-yard touchdown run in the second quarter, but his performance was marred by two fumbles in Commanders territory that ended potential Rams scoring drives. Kicker Lucas Havrisik kicked two field goals as Los Angeles built a 13–0 halftime lead. The Rams started off the second half quickly as quarterback Matthew Stafford found wide receiver Cooper Kupp wide open down the left sideline for a 62-yard touchdown pass. Stafford, who completed 25 of 33 passes for 258 yards, threw a 23-yard touchdown pass to Demarcus Robinson early in the fourth quarter as the Rams opened up a 28–7 lead. But after Havrisik missed a 43-yard field goal, Washington scored touchdowns on back-to-back drives behind backup QB Jacoby Brissett to close to within 28–20 with 1:50 remaining. But the Commanders' attempt at an onside kick was foiled as Kupp batted the ball out of bounds. Five runs by Williams allowed the Rams to run the clock out. Kupp had eight receptions for 111 yards to lead the Rams on offense. Linebacker Ernest Jones had a team-high seven tackles including a sack and safety John Johnson had three tackles with an interception and a pass deflection in the victory.

==== Week 16: vs. New Orleans Saints ====
Week 16: New Orleans Saints at Los Angeles Rams – Game summary

Quarter	1	2	3	4	Total
Saints	0	7	0	15	**22**
**Rams**	7	10	10	3	**30**

at SoFi Stadium, Inglewood, California

- Date: December 21
- Game time: 5:15 p.m. PST
- Game weather: Cloudy, 63 °F (17 °C) (fixed roof)
- Game attendance: 73,228
- Referee: Brad Rogers
- TV announcers (KTTV/Prime Video): Al Michaels, Kirk Herbstreit and Kaylee Hartung
- Recap, Game Book

Game information

**First quarter**

- LAR – Puka Nacua 2-yard pass from Matthew Stafford (Lucas Havrisik kick), 2:28. Rams 7–0. **Drive: 14 plays, 95 yards, 7:56.**

**Second quarter**

- LAR – Lucas Havrisik 20-yard field goal, 10:23. Rams 10–0. **Drive: 7 plays, 50 yards, 3:09.**
- NO – Rashid Shaheed 45-yard pass from Derek Carr (Blake Grupe kick), 2:28. Rams 10–7. **Drive: 3 plays, 63 yards, 1:25.**
- LAR – Demarcus Robinson 4-yard pass from Matthew Stafford (Lucas Havrisik kick), 0:21. Rams 17–7. **Drive: 5 plays, 58 yards, 0:35.**

**Third quarter**

- LAR – Lucas Havrisik 22-yard field goal, 11:10. Rams 20–7. **Drive: 10 plays, 72 yards, 3:50.**
- LAR – Kyren Williams 10-yard run (Lucas Havrisik kick), 5:42. Rams 27–7. **Drive: 5 plays, 41 yards, 2:45.**

**Fourth quarter**

- LAR – Lucas Havrisik 32-yard field goal, 12:44. Rams 30–7. **Drive: 9 plays, 56 yards, 4:55.**
- NO – Juwan Johnson 5-yard pass from Derek Carr (Blake Grupe kick), 6:33. Rams 30–14. **Drive: 12 plays, 75 yards, 6:11.**
- NO – A. T. Perry 35-yard pass from Derek Carr (Derek Carr-Chris Olave pass), 3:53. Rams 30–22. **Drive: 2 plays, 35 yards, 0:40.**

**Top passers**

- NO – Derek Carr – 27/40, 319 yards, 3 TD, INT
- LAR – Matthew Stafford – 24/34, 328 yards, 2 TD

**Top rushers**

- NO – Alvin Kamara – 9 rushes, 19 yards
- LAR – Kyren Williams – 22 rushes, 104 yards, TD

**Top receivers**

- NO – Chris Olave – 9 receptions, 123 yards
- LAR – Puka Nacua – 9 receptions, 164 yards, TD

Playing their final home game of the season, the Rams won their fifth game in six weeks with a convincing victory over the Saints. Rookie wide receiver Puka Nacua produced 180 yards in total offense and caught a 2-yard touchdown pass from quarterback Matthew Stafford to complete L.A.'s 14-play, 95-yard opening drive. Stafford continued his strong play, completing 24 of 34 passes for 328 yards with a second TD pass to wide receiver Demarcus Robinson. who caught six passes for 82 yards in the first half. Stafford threw two or more touchdown passes for the fifth straight game and had his fourth straight game without an interception. Running back Kyren Williams had 104 yards on 22 carries with a third quarter touchdown on a 10-yard run as he became the Rams' first running back to rush for 1,000 yards since Todd Gurley in 2018. Kicker Lucas Havrisik converted three of four field goals as Los Angeles built a 30–7 lead early in the fourth quarter. The Rams defense was led by safety John Johnson's eight total tackles while safety Jordan Fuller added an interception. Linebacker Ernest Jones and rookie defensive end Kobie Turner each had a sack and L.A. held the Saints to just 35 rushing yards on 16 attempts. New Orleans rallied late with two touchdown passes from quarterback Derek Carr to close within 30–22, but Nacua covered the onside kick attempt and the Rams ran out the clock. Nacua, who caught nine passes for 164 yards with a touchdown and ran twice for 16 yards, was named NFC Offensive Player of the Week.

==== Week 17: at New York Giants ====
Week 17: Los Angeles Rams at New York Giants – Game summary

Quarter	1	2	3	4	Total
**Rams**	7	7	6	6	**26**
Giants	0	10	6	9	**25**

at MetLife Stadium, East Rutherford, New Jersey

- Date: December 31
- Game time: 1:00 p.m. EST/10:00 a.m. PST
- Game weather: Overcast, 41 °F (5 °C)
- Game attendance: 75,517
- Referee: Tra Blake
- TV announcers (Fox): Kevin Kugler, Mark Sanchez and Laura Okmin
- Recap, Game Book

Game information

**First quarter**

- LAR – Kyren Williams 4-yard run (Lucas Havrisik kick), 3:07. Rams 7–0. **Drive: 8 plays, 72 yards, 4:27.**

**Second quarter**

- NYG – Wan'Dale Robinson 24-yard run (Mason Crosby kick), 13:03. Tied 7–7. **Drive: 9 plays, 75 yards, 5:04.**
- LAR – Cooper Kupp 5-yard pass from Matthew Stafford (Lucas Havrisik kick), 1:44. Rams 14–7. **Drive: 8 plays, 46 yards, 3:18.**
- NYG – Mason Crosby 31-yard field goal, 0:00. Rams 14–10. **Drive: 5 plays, 30 yards, 0:58.**

**Third quarter**

- LAR – Kyren Williams 2-yard run (kick failed), 10:17. Rams 20–10. **Drive: 4 plays, 88 yards, 1:19.**
- NYG – Darius Slayton 80-yard pass from Tyrod Taylor (kick failed), 4:39. Rams 20–16. **Drive: 4 plays, 91 yards, 1:51.**

**Fourth quarter**

- NYG – Mason Crosby 32-yard field goal, 13:24. Rams 20–19. **Drive: 10 plays, 21 yards, 3:48.**
- LAR – Kyren Williams 28-yard run (kick failed), 12:03. Rams 26–19. **Drive: 3 plays, 75 yards, 1:21.**
- NYG – Gunner Olszewski 94-yard punt return (pass failed), 3:27. Rams 26–25.

**Top passers**

- LAR – Matthew Stafford – 24/34, 317 yards, TD, 2 INT
- NYG – Tyrod Taylor – 27/41, 319 yards, TD, INT

**Top rushers**

- LAR – Kyren Williams – 20 rushes, 87 yards, 3 TD
- NYG – Tyrod Taylor – 6 rushes, 40 yards

**Top receivers**

- LAR – Demarcus Robinson – 6 receptions, 92 yards
- NYG – Wan'Dale Robinson – 6 receptions, 55 yards

Los Angeles ensured itself of a winning season and ultimately a return to the postseason by holding off the host Giants for the Rams' sixth victory in seven weeks. The Rams built a 14–10 halftime lead behind a 4-yard rushing touchdown by running back Kyren Williams and a 5-yard touchdown pass from quarterback Matthew Stafford to wide receiver Cooper Kupp. In the third quarter, on a third-and-four play from the Los Angeles 18, Stafford completed a short pass to wide receiver Puka Nacua, who broke a tackle from New York cornerback Adoree Jackson immediately after catching the pass and broke down the sideline for an 80-yard gain. Nacua's big play set up another short rushing touchdown from Williams for a 20–10 lead, but the ensuing extra point from kicker Lucas Havrisik sailed wide of the uprights. Following an exchange of punts, the Giants responded with a big play of their own when quarterback Tyrod Taylor hit wide receiver Darius Slayton deep down the middle for an 80-yard touchdown (followed by a missed extra point) that cut the Rams' lead back to four. On the Rams' following drive, Stafford was picked off by Giants safety Dane Belton, who advanced the ball well into Los Angeles territory before running out of bounds. However, the Giants could only muster a field goal after starting with advantageous field position thanks to a critical pass breakup in the end zone by Rams cornerback Derion Kendrick on a third down. The Rams responded with a three-play, 75-yard touchdown drive, which was highlighted by Stafford's 37-yard pass to wide receiver Demarcus Robinson and Williams' 28-yard rushing touchdown (his third rushing TD of the game). However, Havrisik missed yet another extra point to keep the Rams' lead at 26–19. Holding onto that same lead with three and a half minutes remaining in the game, the Rams punted the ball back to New York. On the return, Giants return specialist Gunner Olszewski broke free of the grasp of two L.A. defenders and ran to the end zone for a 94-yard touchdown to pull the Giants to within a point. An encroachment penalty on defensive lineman Jonah Williams on the extra point attempt caused Giants head coach Brian Daboll to attempt a two-point conversion from the Rams' 1-yard line. But on the attempt, Taylor failed to connect with wide open running back Saquon Barkley, thus allowing the Rams to maintain a 26–25 lead. From that point, the Rams just needed to pick up one first down to win the game, but they went three-and-out and punted the ball back to New York. The Giants advanced the ball to the outskirts of field goal range, but kicker Mason Crosby missed a go-ahead 54-yard field goal attempt, thus allowing the Rams to drain the clock and seal the win. Rookie nose tackle Kobie Turner had 2.5 sacks and defensive tackle Aaron Donald had two sacks and a pass deflection as the Rams collected six sacks in total. With the win and a loss by rival Seattle later that day, the Rams clinched a playoff berth.

==== Week 18: at San Francisco 49ers ====
Week 18: Los Angeles Rams at San Francisco 49ers – Game summary

Quarter	1	2	3	4	Total
**Rams**	7	0	6	8	**21**
49ers	7	13	0	0	**20**

at Levi's Stadium, Santa Clara, California

- Date: January 7
- Game time: 1:25 p.m. PST
- Game weather: Sunny, 52 °F (11 °C)
- Game attendance: 71,624
- Referee: Clay Martin
- TV announcers (Fox): Adam Amin, Mark Schlereth and Kristina Pink
- Recap, Game Book

Game information

**First quarter**

- SF – Elijah Mitchell 1-yard run (Jake Moody kick), 7:27. 49ers 7–0. **Drive: 12 plays, 75 yards, 7:33.**
- LAR – Puka Nacua 19-yard pass from Carson Wentz (Brett Maher kick), 1:53. Tied 7–7. **Drive: 11 plays, 75 yards, 5:34.**

**Second quarter**

- SF – Sam Darnold 1-yard run (Jake Moody kick), 6:59. 49ers 14–7. **Drive: 16 plays, 75 yards, 9:54.**
- SF – Ronnie Bell 5-yard pass from Sam Darnold (kick failed), 0:11. 49ers 20–7. **Drive: 9 plays, 90 yards, 1:27.**

**Third quarter**

- LAR – Tyler Johnson 8-yard pass from Carson Wentz (kick failed), 4:45. 49ers 20–13. **Drive: 17 plays, 75 yards, 10:15.**

**Fourth quarter**

- LAR – Carson Wentz 12-yard run (Carson Wentz–Tutu Atwell pass), 4:56. Rams 21–20. **Drive: 5 plays, 71 yards, 2:53.**

**Top passers**

- LAR – Carson Wentz – 17/24, 163 yards, 2 TD, INT
- SF – Sam Darnold – 16/26, 189 yards, TD

**Top rushers**

- LAR – Carson Wentz – 17 rushes, 56 yards, TD
- SF – Elijah Mitchell – 14 rushes, 52 yards, TD

**Top receivers**

- LAR – Puka Nacua – 4 receptions, 41 yards, TD
- SF – Chris Conley – 3 receptions, 69 yards

In a game that had both teams resting or limiting their starting lineups, the Rams ended a nine-game regular season losing streak to the 49ers by rallying to defeat their NFC West rivals at Levi's Stadium. Getting his first start of the season in relief of Matthew Stafford, quarterback Carson Wentz completed 17 of 24 passes for 163 yards and two touchdowns, while also carrying the ball 17 times for 56 yards and another touchdown, a 12-yard run with 4:56 remaining. Opting for the two-point conversion, Wentz connected with wide receiver Tutu Atwell in the end zone to give the Rams a 21–20 lead. Safety Russ Yeast led the team with seven tackles including two pass deflections that helped stop the 49ers offense in the second half. Rams wide receiver Puka Nacua had four receptions for 41 yards and scored L.A.'s first touchdown on a 19-yard pass play in the first quarter. Early in the third period, Nacua came out of the game after catching a pair of passes that ended his season with 105 receptions for 1,486 yards, setting new NFL rookie records for receptions and receiving yards. With the victory, Rams head coach Sean McVay moved into second place in regular season coaching victories (70) in franchise history.

=== Standings ===
==== Division ====
NFC West
	W	L	T	PCT	DIV	CONF	PF	PA	STK
^{(1)} San Francisco 49ers	12	5	0	.706	5–1	10–2	491	298	L1
^{(6)} Los Angeles Rams	10	7	0	.588	5–1	8–4	404	377	W4
Seattle Seahawks	9	8	0	.529	2–4	7–5	364	402	W1
Arizona Cardinals	4	13	0	.235	0–6	3–9	330	455	L1

==== Conference ====
NFC
#	Team	Division	W	L	T	PCT	DIV	CONF	SOS	SOV	STK
**Division leaders**
1 (Note: San Francisco finished ahead of Dallas and Detroit based on conference record, claiming the No. 1 seed.)	San Francisco 49ers	West	12	5	0	.706	5–1	10–2	.509	.475	L1
2 (Note: Dallas claimed the No. 2 seed over Detroit based on head-to-head victory.)	Dallas Cowboys	East	12	5	0	.706	5–1	9–3	.446	.392	W2
3	Detroit Lions	North	12	5	0	.706	4–2	8–4	.481	.436	W1
4 (Note: Tampa Bay finished ahead of New Orleans in the NFC South based on common record. (Tampa Bay is 8–4 against Minnesota, Chicago, Detroit, Green Bay, Atlanta, Carolina, Houston, Tennessee, Jacksonville, and Indianapolis, while New Orleans is 6–6 against the same teams.))	Tampa Bay Buccaneers	South	9	8	0	.529	4–2	7–5	.481	.379	W1
**Wild cards**
5	Philadelphia Eagles	East	11	6	0	.647	4–2	7–5	.481	.476	L2
6	Los Angeles Rams	West	10	7	0	.588	5–1	8–4	.529	.453	W4
7 (Note: Green Bay and Seattle finished ahead of New Orleans based on conference record.) (Note: Green Bay finished ahead of Seattle based on strength of victory, claiming the 7th and final playoff spot.)	Green Bay Packers	North	9	8	0	.529	4–2	7–5	.474	.458	W3
**Did not qualify for the postseason**
8	Seattle Seahawks	West	9	8	0	.529	2–4	7–5	.512	.392	W1
9	New Orleans Saints	South	9	8	0	.529	4–2	6–6	.433	.340	W2
10 (Note: Minnesota finished ahead of Atlanta based on head-to-head victory. Division tie break was initially used to eliminate Chicago (see below).) (Note: Minnesota finished ahead of Chicago based on common record. (Minnesota is 5–7 against Tampa Bay, Los Angeles Chargers, Carolina, Kansas City, Green Bay, Atlanta, New Orleans, Denver, Las Vegas, and Detroit, while Chicago is 4–8 against the same teams.))	Minnesota Vikings	North	7	10	0	.412	2–4	6–6	.509	.454	L4
11 (Note: Chicago finished ahead of Atlanta based on head-to-head victory.)	Chicago Bears	North	7	10	0	.412	2–4	6–6	.464	.370	L1
12	Atlanta Falcons	South	7	10	0	.412	3–3	4–8	.429	.462	L2
13	New York Giants	East	6	11	0	.353	3–3	5–7	.512	.353	W1
14 (Note: Washington finished ahead of Arizona based on head-to-head victory.)	Washington Commanders	East	4	13	0	.235	0–6	2–10	.512	.338	L8
15	Arizona Cardinals	West	4	13	0	.235	0–6	3–9	.561	.588	L1
16	Carolina Panthers	South	2	15	0	.118	1–5	1–11	.522	.500	L3
**Tiebreakers** (Note: When breaking ties for three or more teams under the NFL's rules, they are first broken within divisions, then comparing only the highest-ranked remaining team from each division.)

== Postseason ==
=== Schedule ===
Round	Date	Opponent (seed)	Result	Record	Venue	Recap
Wild Card	January 14	at Detroit Lions (3)	L 23–24	0–1	Ford Field	Recap

=== Game summaries ===
==== NFC Wild Card Playoffs: at (3) Detroit Lions ====
NFC Wild Card Playoffs: (6) Los Angeles Rams at (3) Detroit Lions – Game summary

Quarter	1	2	3	4	Total
Rams	3	14	3	3	23
Lions	14	7	3	0	24

at Ford Field, Detroit, Michigan

- Date: January 14, 2024
- Game time: 8:15 p.m. EST/5:15 p.m. PST
- Game weather: None (indoor stadium)
- Game attendance: 66,367
- Referee: Craig Wrolstad
- TV announcers (NBC): Mike Tirico, Cris Collinsworth and Melissa Stark
- Recap, Game Book

Game information

First quarter

- DET – David Montgomery 1-yard run (Michael Badgley kick), 9:30. Lions 7–0. Drive: 10 plays, 75 yards, 5:30.
- LAR – Brett Maher 24-yard field goal, 4:26. Lions 7–3. Drive: 11 plays, 69 yards, 5:04.
- DET – Jahmyr Gibbs 10-yard run (Michael Badgley kick), 1:31. Lions 14–3. Drive: 5 plays, 75 yards, 2:55.

Second quarter

- LAR – Puka Nacua 50-yard pass from Matthew Stafford (Brett Maher kick), 13:24. Lions 14–10. Drive: 6 plays, 72 yards, 3:07.
- DET – Sam LaPorta 2-yard pass from Jared Goff (Michael Badgley kick), 7:12. Lions 21–10. Drive: 11 plays, 75 yards, 6:12.
- LAR – Tutu Atwell 38-yard pass from Matthew Stafford (Brett Maher kick), 4:02. Lions 21–17. Drive: 6 plays, 75 yards, 3:10.

Third quarter

- DET – Michael Badgley 54-yard field goal, 8:41. Lions 24–17. Drive: 9 plays, 44 yards, 4:36.
- LAR – Brett Maher 27-yard field goal, 2:33. Lions 24–20. Drive: 10 plays, 66 yards, 6:08.

Fourth quarter

- LAR – Brett Maher 29-yard field goal, 8:10. Lions 24–23. Drive: 13 plays, 79 yards, 6:43.

Top passers

- LAR – Matthew Stafford – 25/36, 367 yards, 2 TD
- DET – Jared Goff – 22/27, 277 yards, TD

Top rushers

- LAR – Kyren Williams – 13 rushes, 61 yards
- DET – David Montgomery – 14 rushes, 57 yards, TD

Top receivers

- LAR – Puka Nacua – 9 receptions, 181 yards, TD
- DET – Amon-Ra St. Brown – 7 receptions, 110 yards

Facing the Lions in the postseason for the first time since 1952, the Rams fell short in an NFC Wild Card Game. Playing his first game at Ford Field since being traded from the Lions three years earlier, quarterback Matthew Stafford completed 25 of 36 passes for 367 yards, including touchdown passes in the second quarter to wide receivers Puka Nacua (50 yards) and Tutu Atwell (38 yards) as Los Angeles fought back from a 14–3 deficit to trail 21–17 at halftime. Nacua added to his record-setting season by catching nine passes for 181 yards, breaking the NFL record for receiving yards by a rookie in a playoff game. Kicker Brett Maher converted three field goals, but each score came with the Rams' scoring drive having stalled deep into Lions territory. Running back Kyren Williams had 13 carries for 61 yards and caught one pass for nine yards in the loss. After giving up three touchdowns on Detroit's first three possessions, L.A.'s defense stiffened and held Detroit to only a single field goal the rest of the game. Safety Quentin Lake and linebacker Ernest Jones shared the team lead in tackles with nine each, with Jones adding two sacks. Former Rams quarterback Jared Goff completed 22 of 27 passes for 277 yards and a touchdown while Lions wide receiver Josh Reynolds caught five passes for 80 yards as both players had success against the team that originally drafted them.

== Awards and honors ==
Recipient	Award(s)
Ethan Evans	Week 11: NFC Special Teams Player of the Week
Kyren Williams	Week 12: NFC Offensive Player of the Week
Puka Nacua	Week 16: NFC Offensive Player of the Week
