= Alex Ward (American football) =

American football player (born 1999)

No. 47 – Las Vegas Raiders
- Position: Long snapper
- Roster status: Active

Personal information
- Born: April 24, 1999 (age 27); Fort Walton Beach, Florida, U.S.
- Listed height: 6 ft 4 in (1.93 m)
- Listed weight: 240 lb (109 kg)

Career information
- High school: Choctawhatchee (Fort Walton Beach, Florida)
- College: UCF (2017–2022)
- NFL draft: 2023: undrafted

Career history
- Los Angeles Rams (2023–2025); Las Vegas Raiders (2026–present)

Awards and highlights
- Colley Matrix national champion (2017)

Career NFL statistics as of Week 8, 2026
- Games played: 46
- Total tackles: 3
- Stats at Pro Football Reference

Alex Ward (born April 21, 1999) is an American professional football long snapper for the Las Vegas Raiders of the National Football League (NFL). He played college football for the UCF Knights and he was signed as an undrafted free agent by the Los Angeles Rams in 2023.

== Early life ==
Ward grew up in Fort Walton Beach, Florida and attended Choctawhatchee High School.

== College career ==
Ward redshirted his true freshman year at UCF and spent his redshirt freshman season as a backup long snapper. As a redshirt senior, he was a finalist for the Patrick Mannelly Award. Ward used the extra year of eligibility granted to college athletes due to the COVID-19 pandemic and returned to UCF for a sixth season and was a finalist for the Mannelly Award for a second straight year. Ward played in 47 games over the course of his college career. After the conclusion of his college career Ward played in the 2023 Senior Bowl and the 2023 Hula Bowl.

== Professional career ==
Pre-draft measurables
Height	Weight	Arm length	Hand span	Wingspan	40-yard dash	10-yard split	20-yard split	20-yard shuttle	Vertical jump	Broad jump	Bench press
6 ft 4 in (1.93 m)	240 lb (109 kg)	30 3/8 in (0.77 m)	9 5/8 in (0.24 m)	6 ft 2 1/2 in (1.89 m)	5.06 s	1.80 s	2.94 s	4.46 s	30.0 in (0.76 m)	9 ft 6 in (2.90 m)	14 reps
All values from NFL Combine/Pro Day

=== Los Angeles Rams ===
Ward was signed by the Los Angeles Rams as an undrafted free agent on April 29, 2023, shortly after the conclusion of the 2023 NFL draft. On August 29, 2023, the Rams announced that he had made the initial 53-man roster. Ward played in 13 games during the 2023 season and participated in all 17 games in 2024.

During the 2025 season, the Rams placekicking operation was beset by numerous blocked or missed kicks, which proved crucial in a pair of early season losses. After handling snaps in the team's first eight games, Ward was inactive for the Rams' Week 10 game against the San Francisco 49ers and was replaced as long snapper by veteran Jake McQuaide. One day later, on November 10, 2025, Ward was released by the Rams.

=== Las Vegas Raiders ===
On January 21, 2026, Ward signed a reserve/futures contract with the Las Vegas Raiders.

== NFL career statistics ==
Legend
**Bold**	Career high

=== Regular season ===
Year	Team	Games		Tackles					Interceptions						Fumbles				
Year	Team	GP	GS	Cmb	Solo	Ast	Sck	TFL	Int	Yds	Avg	Lng	TD	PD	FF	Fum	FR	Yds	TD
2023	LAR	13	0	**1**	0	**1**	0.0	0	0	0	0.0	0	0	0	0	0	0	0	0
2024	LAR	**17**	0	0	0	0	0.0	0	0	0	0.0	0	0	0	0	0	0	0	0
2025	LAR	8	0	**1**	0	**1**	0.0	0	0	0	0.0	0	0	0	0	0	0	0	0
Career		38	0	2	0	2	0.0	0	0	0	0.0	0	0	0	0	0	0	0	0

=== Postseason ===
Year	Team	Games		Tackles					Interceptions						Fumbles				
Year	Team	GP	GS	Cmb	Solo	Ast	Sck	TFL	Int	Yds	Avg	Lng	TD	PD	FF	Fum	FR	Yds	TD
2024	LAR	2	0	0	0	0	0.0	0	0	0	0.0	0	0	0	0	0	0	0	0
Career		2	0	0	0	0	0.0	0	0	0	0.0	0	0	0	0	0	0	0	0
