= Jonah Williams (defensive lineman) =

American football player (born 1995)

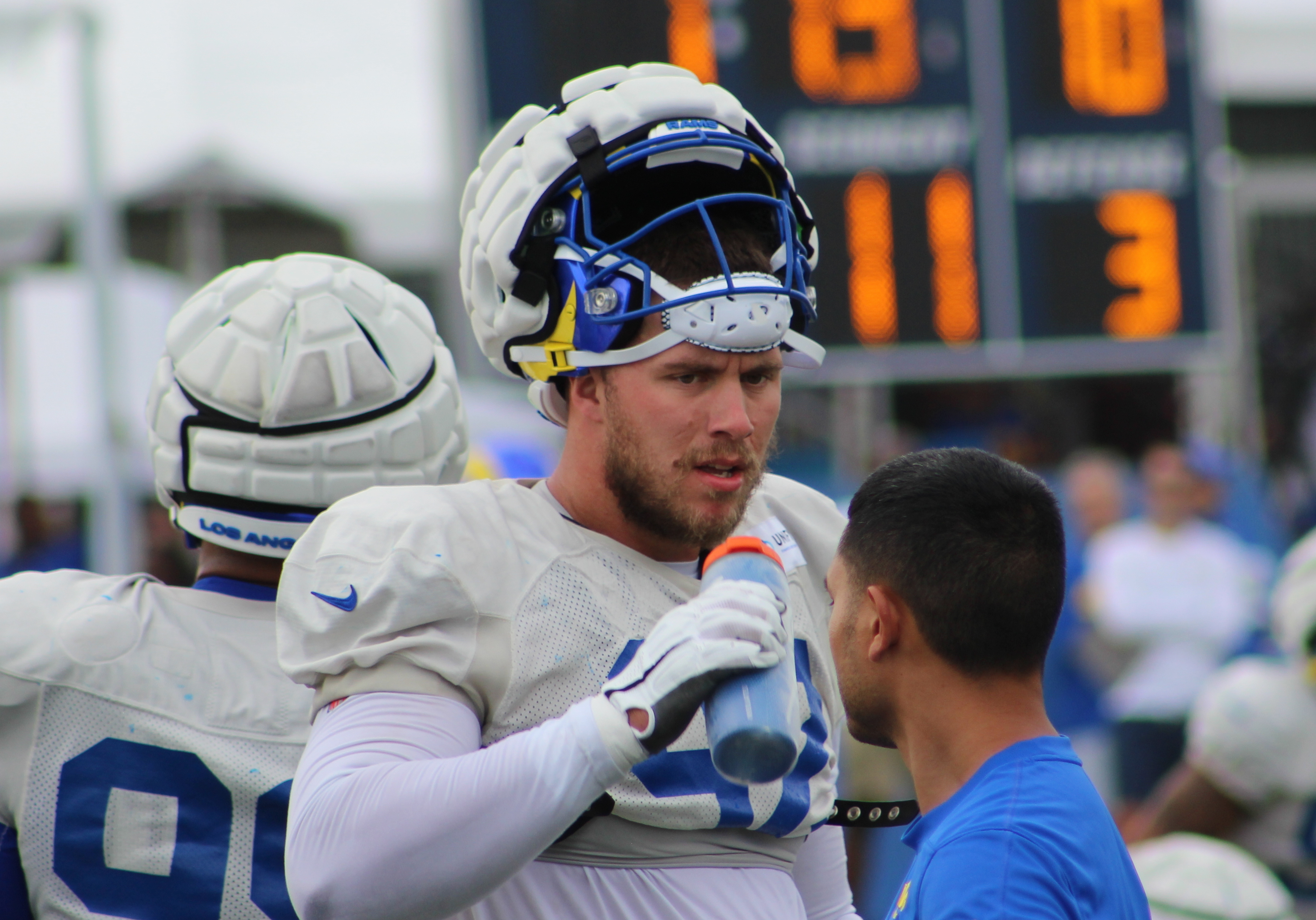
- Williams with the Los Angeles Rams in 2023

No. 54 – New Orleans Saints
- Position: Defensive end
- Roster status: Practice squad

Personal information
- Born: August 17, 1995 (age 31); Puyallup, Washington, U.S.
- Listed height: 6 ft 5 in (1.96 m)
- Listed weight: 280 lb (127 kg)

Career information
- High school: Rocky Mountain (Meridian, Idaho)
- College: Weber State (2016–2019)
- NFL draft: 2020: undrafted

Career history
- Los Angeles Rams (2020–2021); Minnesota Vikings (2021); Los Angeles Rams (2021–2023); Minnesota Vikings (2024)*; Los Angeles Rams (2024); Detroit Lions (2024); New Orleans Saints (2025); Arizona Cardinals (2026)*; New Orleans Saints (2026–present)*
- * Offseason or practice squad member only

Awards and highlights
- Super Bowl champion (LVI); Big Sky Defensive Player of the Year (2019); 2× First-team All-Big Sky (2018, 2019); Second-team All-Big Sky (2017)

Career NFL statistics as of 2025
- Total tackles: 98
- Sacks: 5.5
- Pass deflections: 1
- Stats at Pro Football Reference

Jonah Williams (born August 17, 1995) is an American professional football defensive end for the New Orleans Saints of the National Football League (NFL). He played college football for the Weber State Wildcats.

== College career ==
Williams originally signed to play college football at Weber State University, which was the only school to offer him a scholarship, in 2013 after considering offers from Boise State and Utah State to join their programs as a preferred walk-on. After graduating from high school, he served a Latter-Day Saint mission in São Paulo, Brazil and did not enroll at Weber State until December 2015. Williams was a four-year starter for the Weber State Wildcats. He finished his collegiate career with 194 total tackles, 28 tackles for loss, and 15 sacks with three forced fumbles and three fumble recoveries in 54 games played.

== Professional career ==
Pre-draft measurables
Height	Weight	Arm length	Hand span	Wingspan
6 ft 5 in (1.96 m)	269 lb (122 kg)	34 1/2 in (0.88 m)	10 in (0.25 m)	6 ft 8 1/8 in (2.04 m)
All values from Pro Day

=== Los Angeles Rams (first stint) ===
Williams was signed by the Los Angeles Rams as an undrafted free agent following the 2020 NFL draft on April 26, 2020. He was waived on September 4, 2020, during final roster cuts, and was subsequently signed to the team's practice squad one day later. Williams signed a reserve/futures contract with the team on January 18, 2021.

Williams made the Rams' 53-man roster out of training camp to start the 2021 season. He played in eight games before being waived on November 2, 2021.

=== Minnesota Vikings (first stint) ===
On November 3, 2021, Williams was claimed off waivers by the Minnesota Vikings, but was waived the next day after failing his physical.

=== Los Angeles Rams (second stint) ===
On November 9, 2021, the Rams signed Williams to their practice squad. Williams won his first Super Bowl ring when the Rams defeated the Cincinnati Bengals in Super Bowl LVI.

On February 15, 2022, Williams signed a reserve/future contract with the Rams.

=== Minnesota Vikings (second stint) ===
On March 18, 2024, Williams was signed by the Minnesota Vikings to return for a second stint with the team. He was waived on August 27, and re-signed to the practice squad.

=== Los Angeles Rams (third stint) ===
On October 4, 2024, the Rams signed Williams to the active roster off the Vikings practice squad.

=== Detroit Lions ===
On November 30, 2024, Williams was signed by the Detroit Lions off the Rams practice squad.

=== New Orleans Saints ===
On March 17, 2025, Williams signed with the New Orleans Saints. He was released on August 26 as part of final roster cuts and re-signed to the practice squad the following day. On September 13, Williams was signed to the active roster. He made 15 total appearances (including one start) for New Orleans, recording three sacks and 18 combined tackles.

=== Arizona Cardinals ===
On March 12, 2026, Williams signed a one-year contract with the Arizona Cardinals. He was released by the Cardinals as a part of final roster cuts on August 30.

=== New Orleans Saints (second stint) ===
On September 7, 2026, Williams was signed to the New Orleans Saints' practice squad, but was released two days later. On September 14, Williams was re-signed to the Saints' practice squad.

== NFL career statistics ==
Legend
	Won the Super Bowl
**Bold**	Career high

=== Regular season ===
Year	Team	Games		Tackles					Interceptions						Fumbles				
Year	Team	GP	GS	Cmb	Solo	Ast	Sck	TFL	Int	Yds	Avg	Lng	TD	PD	FF	Fum	FR	Yds	TD
2021	LAR	8	0	5	1	4	0.0	0	0	0	0.0	0	0	0	0	0	0	0	0
2022	LAR	16	6	23	11	12	0.5	0	0	0	0.0	0	0	0	0	0	0	0	0
2023	LAR	17	16	**49**	**20**	**29**	2.0	4	0	0	0.0	0	0	**1**	0	0	0	0	0
2024	MIN	1	0	0	0	0	0.0	0	0	0	0.0	0	0	0	0	0	0	0	0
2024	LAR	6	0	3	1	2	0.0	1	0	0	0.0	0	0	0	0	0	0	0	0
2024	DET	2	1	0	0	0	0.0	0	0	0	0.0	0	0	0	0	0	0	0	0
2025	NO	15	1	18	8	10	**3.0**	**5**	0	0	0.0	0	0	0	0	0	0	0	0
Career		65	24	98	41	57	5.5	10	0	0	0.0	0	0	1	0	0	0	0	0

=== Postseason ===
Year	Team	Games		Tackles					Interceptions						Fumbles				
Year	Team	GP	GS	Cmb	Solo	Ast	Sck	TFL	Int	Yds	Avg	Lng	TD	PD	FF	Fum	FR	Yds	TD
2023	LAR	1	1	**3**	**2**	**1**	0.0	**1**	0	0	0.0	0	0	0	0	0	0	0	0
2024	DET	1	0	0	0	0	0.0	0	0	0	0.0	0	0	0	0	0	0	0	0
Career		2	1	3	2	1	0.0	1	0	0	0.0	0	0	0	0	0	0	0	0
