= Davis Allen (American football) =

American football player (born 2001)

No. 87 – Los Angeles Rams
- Position: Tight end
- Roster status: Active

Personal information
- Born: February 3, 2001 (age 25); Calhoun, Georgia, U.S.
- Listed height: 6 ft 6 in (1.98 m)
- Listed weight: 253 lb (115 kg)

Career information
- High school: Calhoun
- College: Clemson (2019–2022)
- NFL draft: 2023: 5th round, 175th overall pick

Career history
- Los Angeles Rams (2023–present)

Awards and highlights
- Third-team All-ACC (2022)

Career NFL statistics as of Week 8, 2026
- Receptions: 52
- Receiving yards: 433
- Receiving touchdowns: 6
- Stats at Pro Football Reference

Davis Allen (born February 3, 2001) is an American professional football tight end for the Los Angeles Rams of the National Football League (NFL). He played college football for the Clemson Tigers.

== Early life ==
Allen grew up in Calhoun, Georgia and attended Calhoun High School. Davis was rated a four star recruit and committed to play college football at Clemson over offers from Virginia Tech, Duke, Wake Forest, and Ole Miss. Allen’s brother, Reed, played college football at Air Force.

== College career ==
Allen played in 15 games during his freshman season with the Clemson Tigers and was used primarily as an in-line blocker. He caught 16 passes for 247 yards and four touchdowns in his sophomore season. Allen had 28 receptions for 208 yards and three touchdowns as a junior. He was named third-team All-Atlantic Coast Conference as a senior after catching 39 passes for 443 yards and five touchdowns.

== Professional career ==
Pre-draft measurables
| Height | Weight | Arm length | Hand span | Wingspan | 40-yard dash | 10-yard split | 20-yard split | 20-yard shuttle | Three-cone drill | Vertical jump | Broad jump |
|---|---|---|---|---|---|---|---|---|---|---|---|
| 6 ft 5 7/8 in (1.98 m) | 245 lb (111 kg) | 32 1/4 in (0.82 m) | 10 in (0.25 m) | 6 ft 7 3/4 in (2.03 m) | 4.84 s | 1.60 s | 2.73 s | 4.45 s | 7.31 s | 38.5 in (0.98 m) | 10 ft 5 in (3.18 m) |
All values from NFL Combine/Pro Day

=== 2023 season ===
Allen was selected by the Los Angeles Rams in the fifth round, 175th overall, of the 2023 NFL draft.On June 20, 2023, Allen signed a four-year rookie contract worth $4.08 million.

As a rookie, Allen played in 15 of 17 games during the regular season. In Week 14, Allen caught a season-high four passes for 50 yards, including a 7-yard pass from quarterback Matthew Stafford for his first career NFL touchdown in the Rams' 37–31 overtime loss to the Baltimore Ravens. Against the San Francisco 49ers in Week 18, Allen made his first professional start, catching four passes for 25 yards in the Rams' 21–20 victory. He finished the regular season with 10 receptions for 95 yards and a touchdown. In an NFC Wild Card Game at Detroit, Allen caught two passes for 28 yards in the Rams' 24–23 loss to the Lions.

=== 2024 season ===
During the regular season, Allen played in 15 out of 17 games, and made the first out of five consecutive starts in Week 10, catching five passes for 34 yards in the Rams' 23-15 loss to the Miami Dolphins. For the regular season, Allen caught six passes for 39 yards but was held without a score. In L.A.'s 27-9 victory over the Minnesota Vikings in an NFC Wild Card Game, Allen caught one pass for a 13-yard touchdown, but had no receptions in the Rams' 28-22 loss at Philadelphia.

=== 2025 season ===
Allen played in all 17 regular season games and started in five (including the team's final four games), setting new personal single season highs in receptions (24), yardage (208) and touchdowns (three) as he helped the Rams reach the playoffs for the third consecutive season. Allen played a career-high number of snaps as the Rams made a significant increase in their usage of multi-tight end sets, notably having an irregular increase in their usage of 13 Personnel, a grouping of three tight ends and one running back, rather than the more commonly-used 12 Personnel grouping, which consists of two tight ends and one running back, with Allen being a part of a tight end unit that also featured veterans Tyler Higbee and Colby Parkinson and rookie Terrance Ferguson.

Allen's personal role in the Rams' offense often included acting as a lead blocker from the backfield as a fullback and/or H-Back. He finished the 2025 regular season with 24 receptions for 208 yards and three touchdowns during the regular season. Allen made his first career postseason start in the L.A.'s 34-31 win over Carolina in an NFC Wild Card playoff. He played in all three of the Rams' playoff games but did not catch a pass in any of them.

=== 2026 season ===
With injuries to fellow tight ends Ferguson and Parkinson, Allen frequently found himself in L.A.'s starting lineup. He had no receptions in Week 6 against Arizona, but was held for no gain on his first career rushing attempt on a fourth-and-1 play in the third quarter of the Rams' 18-16 loss. A week later, Allen caught four passes for 20 yards and two touchdowns for the first multi-TD game of his career in the Rams' 35-21 victory over the Las Vegas Raiders in Week 7.

== Career statistics ==
=== NFL ===
Legend
| **Bold** | Career high |

==== Regular season ====
| Year | Team | Games | | Receiving | | | | | Fumbles | |
| Year | Team | GP | GS | Rec | Yds | Avg | Lng | TD | Fum | Lost |
|---|---|---|---|---|---|---|---|---|---|---|
| 2023 | LAR | 15 | 1 | 10 | 95 | **9.5** | 21 | 1 | 0 | 0 |
| 2024 | LAR | 15 | 5 | 6 | 39 | 6.5 | 13 | 0 | 0 | 0 |
| 2025 | LAR | 17 | 5 | **24** | **208** | 8.7 | **27** | **3** | 0 | 0 |
| 2026 | LAR | 8 | 5 | 12 | 91 | 7.6 | 21 | 2 | 0 | 0 |
| Career | | 55 | 16 | 52 | 433 | 8.6 | 27 | 6 | 0 | 0 |

==== Postseason ====
| Year | Team | Games | | Receiving | | | | | Fumbles | |
| Year | Team | GP | GS | Rec | Yds | Avg | Lng | TD | Fum | Lost |
|---|---|---|---|---|---|---|---|---|---|---|
| 2023 | LAR | 1 | 0 | **2** | **28** | **14.0** | **22** | 0 | 0 | 0 |
| 2024 | LAR | 2 | 0 | 1 | 13 | 13.0 | 13 | **1** | 0 | 0 |
| 2025 | LAR | **3** | **1** | 0 | 0 | 0.0 | - | 0 | 0 | 0 |
| Career | | 6 | 1 | 3 | 41 | 13.7 | 22 | 1 | 0 | 0 |

=== College ===
| Season | Team | Games | | Receiving | | | | |
| Season | Team | GP | GS | Rec | Yds | Avg | Long | TD |
|---|---|---|---|---|---|---|---|---|
| 2019 | Clemson | 15 | 1 | 5 | 53 | 10.6 | 15 | 0 |
| 2020 | Clemson | 12 | 0 | 16 | 247 | 15.4 | 42 | 4 |
| 2021 | Clemson | 13 | 10 | 28 | 208 | 7.4 | 24 | 3 |
| 2022 | Clemson | 14 | 14 | 39 | 443 | 11.4 | 41 | 5 |
| Career | | 54 | 25 | 88 | 951 | 10.8 | 42 | 12 |
