= Derion Kendrick =

American football player (born 2000)

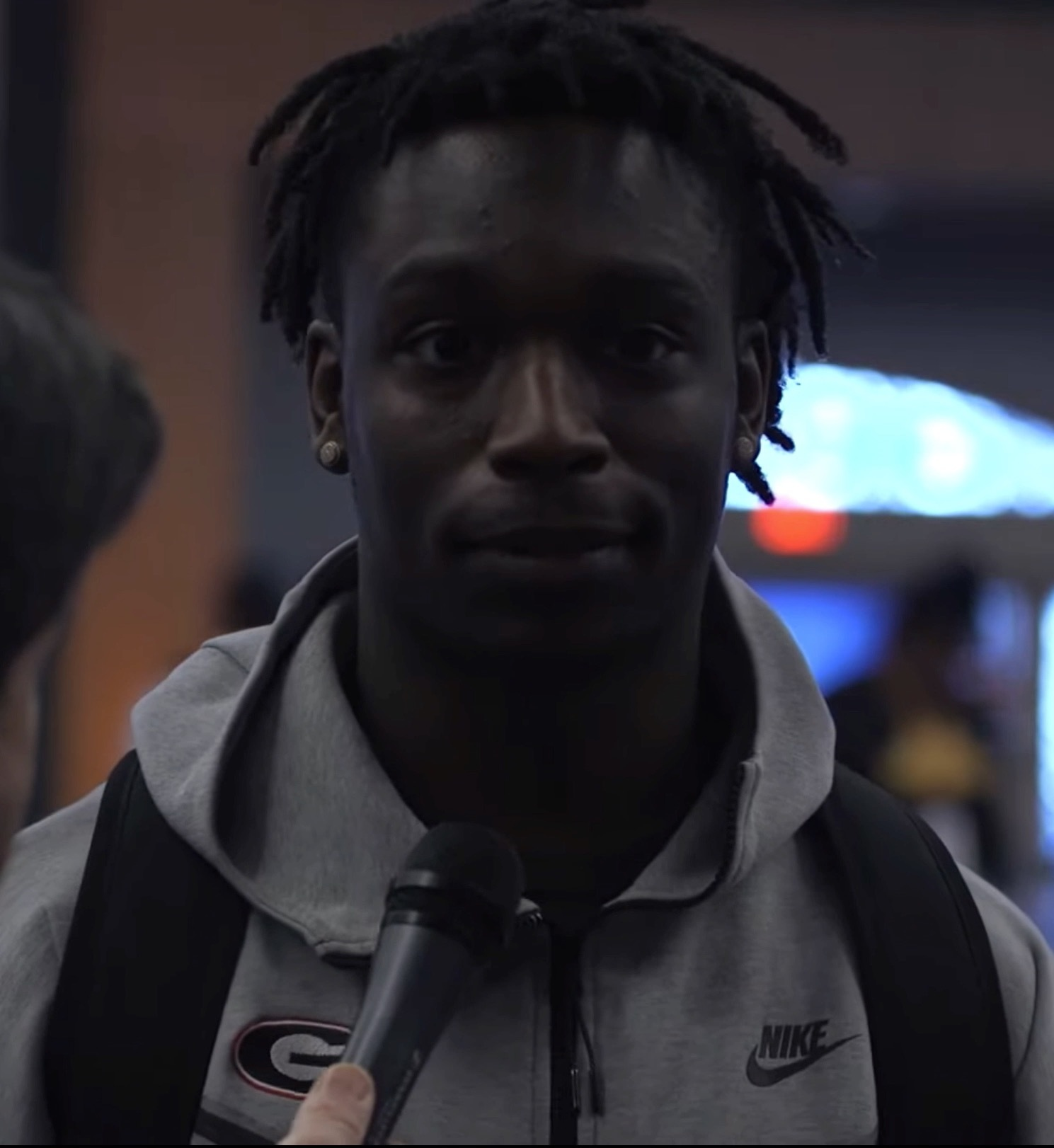
- Kendrick in 2022

No. 15 – Dallas Cowboys
- Position: Cornerback
- Roster status: Practice squad

Personal information
- Born: August 24, 2000 (age 26); Rock Hill, South Carolina, U.S.
- Listed height: 6 ft 0 in (1.83 m)
- Listed weight: 205 lb (93 kg)

Career information
- High school: South Pointe (Rock Hill)
- College: Clemson (2018–2020); Georgia (2021)
- NFL draft: 2022: 6th round, 212th overall pick

Career history
- Los Angeles Rams (2022–2024); Seattle Seahawks (2025); Los Angeles Rams (2025); Dallas Cowboys (2026–present)

Awards and highlights
- 2× CFP national champion (2018, 2021); First-team All-ACC (2020); Second-team All-SEC (2021); Second-team All-ACC (2019)

Career NFL statistics as of Week 6, 2026
- Total tackles: 102
- Pass deflections: 19
- Interceptions: 3
- Stats at Pro Football Reference

Derion Rayshawn Kendrick (born August 24, 2000) is an American professional football cornerback for the Dallas Cowboys of the National Football League (NFL). He played college football for the Clemson Tigers and Georgia Bulldogs. Originally drafted by the Los Angeles Rams, he spent most of his first four seasons with the club, and also played for the Seattle Seahawks.

== Early life ==
Kendrick attended South Pointe High School in Rock Hill, South Carolina. He played quarterback and wide receiver in high school. As a senior, he was the South Carolina Gatorade Football Player of the Year after passing for 2,683 yards and 30 touchdowns and rushing for 1,194 yards and 20 touchdowns. Kendrick played in the 2018 U.S. Army All-American Game and was a finalist for the U. S. Army Player of the Year Award. He committed to Clemson University to play college football.

== College career ==
Kendrick started his Clemson career in 2018 as a wide receiver. As a true freshman that season, he played in 15 games, recording 15 receptions for 210 yards. Prior to his sophomore season in 2019, he transitioned into a cornerback on an emergency basis, but after impressing coaches, he moved to the position full-time and earned a starting job. In 15 starts he had 43 tackles, two interceptions and a touchdown.

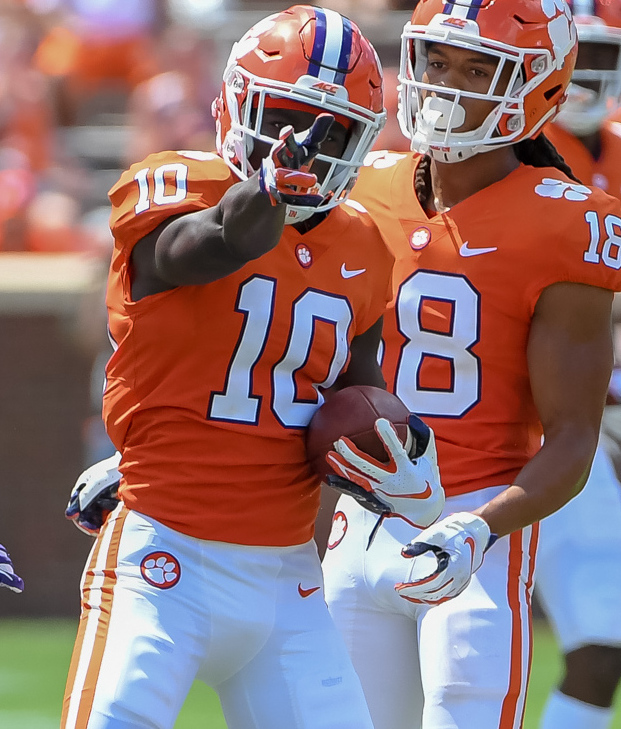
Kendrick with Clemson in 2018

In February 2021, Kendrick was dismissed from the Clemson University football team. This came after a history of disciplinary problems. In June, he announced he was transferring to Georgia.

== Professional career ==
Pre-draft measurables
Height	Weight	Arm length	Hand span	Wingspan	40-yard dash	10-yard split	20-yard split	Vertical jump	Broad jump
5 ft 11 7/8 in (1.83 m)	194 lb (88 kg)	31 in (0.79 m)	9 1/8 in (0.23 m)	6 ft 2 3/8 in (1.89 m)	4.79 s	1.60 s	2.77 s	31.0 in (0.79 m)	9 ft 6 in (2.90 m)
All values from NFL Combine/Pro Day

=== Los Angeles Rams ===
Kendrick was selected by the Los Angeles Rams in the sixth round, 212th overall, of the 2022 NFL draft. In his rookie season, he appeared in 15 games, of which he started six. He had 43 total tackles (36 solo) and four passes defended.

On July 25, 2024, head coach Sean McVay announced that Kendrick had suffered a torn ACL in practice, ending his season.

On June 13, 2025, Kendrick was waived by the Rams and was re-signed four days later. He was waived on August 26 as part of final roster cuts.

=== Seattle Seahawks ===
On August 27, 2025, Kendrick was claimed off of waivers by the Seattle Seahawks. He played in 10 games for the Seahawks, recording five passes defensed, two interceptions, four solo tackles, and three assisted tackles. Kendrick was released by the Seahawks on November 25.

=== Los Angeles Rams (second stint) ===
On November 26, 2025, Kendrick was claimed off waivers by the Los Angeles Rams. He played in five total games for Los Angeles, recording three tackles.

=== Dallas Cowboys ===
On March 24, 2026, Kendrick signed a one-year contract with the Dallas Cowboys. On August 30, he was released by the Cowboys as a part of final roster cuts; he was re-signed to the team's practice squad the following day.

== NFL career statistics ==
Legend
**Bold**	Career high

=== Regular season ===
Year	Team	Games		Tackles					Interceptions						Fumbles				
Year	Team	GP	GS	Cmb	Solo	Ast	Sck	TFL	Int	Yds	Avg	Lng	TD	PD	FF	Fum	FR	Yds	TD
2022	LAR	15	6	43	36	7	0.0	0	0	0	0.0	0	0	4	0	0	0	0	0
2023	LAR	**17**	**12**	**49**	**41**	**8**	0.0	**3**	1	0	0.0	0	0	**10**	0	0	0	0	0
2025	SEA	10	0	7	4	3	0.0	1	**2**	0	0.0	0	0	5	0	0	0	0	0
2025	LAR	5	0	3	3	0	0.0	0	0	0	0.0	0	0	0	0	0	0	0	0
2026	DAL	1	0	0	0	0	0.0	0	0	0	0.0	0	0	0	0	0	0	0	0
Career		48	18	102	84	18	0.0	4	3	0	0.0	0	0	19	0	0	0	0	0

=== Postseason ===
Year	Team	Games		Tackles					Interceptions						Fumbles				
Year	Team	GP	GS	Cmb	Solo	Ast	Sck	TFL	Int	Yds	Avg	Lng	TD	PD	FF	Fum	FR	Yds	TD
2023	LAR	1	0	0	0	0	0.0	0	0	0	0.0	0	0	0	0	0	0	0	0
Career		1	0	0	0	0	0.0	0	0	0	0.0	0	0	0	0	0	0	0	0

== Legal troubles ==
On October 16, 2023, Kendrick was arrested in Hollywood, California for illegal possession of a concealed weapon. Police also found marijuana in Kendrick's vehicle. The charges were dismissed on June 4, 2024.
