= Lucas Havrisik =

American football player (born 1999)

Profile
- Position: Kicker

Personal information
- Born: September 29, 1999 (age 27); Riverside, California, U.S.
- Listed height: 6 ft 2 in (1.88 m)
- Listed weight: 185 lb (84 kg)

Career information
- High school: Norco (Norco, California)
- College: Arizona (2017–2021)
- NFL draft: 2022: undrafted

Career history
- Indianapolis Colts (2022)*; Cleveland Browns (2023)*; Los Angeles Rams (2023); Cleveland Browns (2024)*; Buffalo Bills (2024)*; Arlington Renegades (2025); Green Bay Packers (2025)
- * Offseason or practice squad member only

Awards and highlights
- UFL field goals leader (2025)

Career NFL statistics as of 2025
- Field goals made: 19
- Field goals attempted: 24
- Field goal %: 79.2%
- Longest field goal: 61
- Extra points made: 26
- Extra points attempted: 31
- Extra point %: 83.9%
- Points: 83
- Stats at Pro Football Reference

Lucas Havrisik HAV-rə-sik; (born September 29, 1999) is an American professional football kicker. He played college football for the Arizona Wildcats.

== Early life ==
In Havrisik's senior season he was 11 for 16 on field goal attempts with a long of 51 yards, and he also went 48 for 50 on extra points, while also punting 40 times. Havrisik would decide to commit to play college football for the Arizona Wildcats over others schools such as Portland State and UNLV.

== College career ==
In week nine of the 2017 season, Havrisik converted on a 57-yard field goal which tied the school record, and had nine touchbacks on ten kickoffs. For his performance on the week he was named the Pac-12 special teams player of the week. In Havrisik's first season at Arizona in 2017, he went three for four on field goals and two for two on extra points. In the 2018 season, Havrisik finished the year going 22 for 24 on extra point attempts, and six for eleven on field goal attempts, while finishing the year with 81.1% touchback rate, which would rank him ninth in the FBS on the year. In week seven of the 2019 season, Havrisik went two for two on field goals, including booting a 50 yard field goal, and also having five touchbacks on five kickoffs. For his performance on the game he was named the Pac-12 special teams player of the week. Havrisik finished the 2019 season going 37 for 39 on extra points and 10 for 17 on field goal attempts. In the shortend 2020 season, Havrisik finished the year going nine for ten on extra point and six for seven on field goal attempts. In the 2021 season, Havrisik would convert on all three of his extra points, and go nine for fourteen on his field goals.

Havrisik finished his career at Arizona going 73 for 78 on his extra points, and 34 for 53 on his field goal attempts for a 64.2% field goal percentage.

== Professional career ==
Pre-draft measurables
Height	Weight	Arm length	Hand span	Wingspan
6 ft 1 7/8 in (1.88 m)	185 lb (84 kg)	30 1/2 in (0.77 m)	8 3/8 in (0.21 m)	6 ft 2 1/8 in (1.88 m)
All values from Pro Day

=== Indianapolis Colts ===
On September 13, 2022, Havrisik signed with the Indianapolis Colts practice squad to compete for their starting kicker job with Chase McLaughlin. However just six days later, Havrisik was released from the Colts practice squad. On January 10, 2023, Havrisik signed a reserve/future contract with the Colts. He was then be waived during final roster cuts on August 27.

=== Cleveland Browns ===
On August 30, 2023, Havrisik was signed to the Cleveland Browns' practice squad.

=== Los Angeles Rams ===
On October 24, 2023, Havrisik was signed to the Los Angeles Rams off of the Browns' practice squad after veteran Brett Maher was released. On October 29, Havrisik made his first field goal for the Rams in Week 8 against the Dallas Cowboys. On November 19, Havrisik made an eventual game-winning 22-yard field goal in Week 11 against the Seattle Seahawks. Havrisik was waived on January 1, 2024.

=== Cleveland Browns (second stint) ===
On January 24, 2024, Havrisik signed a reserve/future contract with the Browns. He was waived by the Browns on June 4. On August 23, Havrisik was re-signed by the Browns and subsequently waived three days later.

=== Buffalo Bills ===
On October 17, 2024, Havrisik was signed to the Buffalo Bills' practice squad. He was released on October 31.

=== Arlington Renegades ===
On December 5, 2024, Havrisik signed with the Arlington Renegades of the United Football League (UFL).

=== Green Bay Packers ===
On October 11, 2025, Havrisik signed with the Green Bay Packers following an injury to Brandon McManus. In a game against the Arizona Cardinals on October 19, Havrisik kicked a 61-yard field goal, setting a new Packers franchise record. On November 26, he was released by the Packers, and re-signed to the practice squad.

Havrisik signed a reserve/future contract with Green Bay on January 12, 2026. On July 28, he was released by the Packers following the signing of Lenny Krieg.

== NFL career statistics ==
Legend
**Bold**	Career high

=== Regular season ===
General			Field goals					PATs			Kickoffs			Points
Season	Team	GP	FGM	FGA	FG%	Blck	Long	XPM	XPA	XP%	KO	Avg	TBs	Pts
2023	LAR	**9**	**15**	**20**	75.0	0	52	**19**	**22**	**86.4**	8	**66.0**	**7**	**64**
2025	GB	3	4	4	**100.0**	0	**61**	7	9	77.8	**16**	63.0	5	21
Total		12	19	24	79.2	0	61	26	31	83.9	24	64.0	12	85
Source: pro-football-reference.com
