= North Surry High School =

American public school in North Carolina

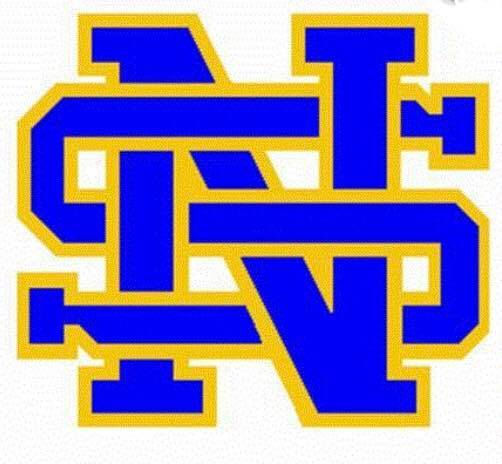

Location
- 2440 W. Pine St. Mount Airy, North Carolina 27030; United States
- Coordinates: 36°30′16″N 80°40′25″W

Information
- School type: Public
- Established: 1958 (68 years ago)
- School district: Surry County School District
- CEEB code: 342782
- Principal: Paige Badgett
- Staff: 50 (FTE)
- Grades: 9–12
- Enrollment: 843 (2024-2025)
- Student to teacher ratio: 17:1
- Colors: Blue and grey
- Team name: Greyhounds
- Website: www.surry.k12.nc.us/o/nsh

North Surry High School, located on W Pine Street in Mount Airy, North Carolina, first opened in 1958. Its team name is the Greyhounds, and the school colors are blue and grey.

== History ==
North Surry High School was established in 1958 to serve the educational needs of Mount Airy and the surrounding communities in Surry County, North Carolina. The school's yearbook, North Star, has been published since at least 1960, reflecting its longstanding presence in the region.

Over the decades, North Surry High School has developed a reputation for academic excellence, offering a comprehensive curriculum that includes Advanced Placement (AP) courses, a Gifted and Talented program, and Project Lead The Way (PLTW) courses with a STEM focus.

== Academics ==
North Surry High School offers a comprehensive academic curriculum that includes Advanced Placement (AP) courses, a Gifted and Talented program, and Project Lead The Way (PLTW) courses with a STEM focus.

According to U.S. News & World Report, the school is ranked 314th within North Carolina.

== Student body ==
As of recent data, North Surry High School enrolls approximately 843 students. The school maintains a student–teacher ratio of 18:1.

== Extracurricular activities ==
=== Athletics ===
The school's athletic teams are known as the Greyhounds. North Surry competes in a wide range of sports including football, basketball, baseball, soccer, and track and field.

=== Clubs and Organizations ===
North Surry supports a variety of extracurricular clubs and organizations, such as:

- Future Farmers of America (FFA)
- Health Occupations Students of America (HOSA)
- Interact Club
- Quiz Bowl
- Student Government
- National Honor Society
- Junior Reserve Officers' Training Corps (JROTC)
- Music and Arts programs

== 1989 Basketball championship ==
In 1989, the North Surry High School boys' basketball team won the North Carolina High School Athletic Association (NCHSAA) 3A state championship. The title game was held at the Dean E. Smith Center in Chapel Hill, North Carolina, where North Surry defeated Southern Alamance High School with a final score of 81–66.

The 1989 victory marked the school's fourth state basketball title, following previous championships in 1963, 1966, and 1967. The win solidified North Surry's legacy in high school basketball history and remains a celebrated achievement within the local community.

In 2024, the Class of 1989 commemorated the 35th anniversary of the championship during their class reunion, honoring the players, coaches, and supporters who contributed to the team's success.

== Community engagement ==
North Surry High School emphasizes strong community and parent involvement. The school offers various academic and extracurricular programs designed to enhance student engagement and success.

== Notable alumni ==
- Ethan Evans – NFL punter for the Los Angeles Rams; drafted in the 7th round of the 2023 NFL Draft; first Division II player selected that year; alumnus of North Surry High School.
