= Corum =

Corum may refer to:

== People ==
- Blake Corum (born 2000), American football player
- Gene Corum (1921–2010), American football coach
- James Corum, American military historian
- Lora L. Corum (1899–1949), American racecar driver

== Places ==
- Çorum, city in Turkey; capital of Çorum Province
- Çorum Province, district in Turkey's Black Sea Region
- Corum, Acıpayam
- Corum (Montpellier), building in Montpellier, France
- Corum, Oklahoma, an unincorporated community in the American state.

== Elements in works of English author Michael Moorcock ==
- Corum Jhaelen Irsei, protagonist in a series of books published between 1971 and 1974
- Corum, supplement to role-playing game Stormbringer, published in 2001 by Darcsyde Productions

== Other uses ==
- Corum (watchmakers), Swiss watch manufacturing concern based in La Chaux-de-Fonds, Canton of Neuchâtel
- Corum II: Dark Lord, 1999 video game

== See also ==
- Coram (disambiguation)
