= Coram =

Coram may refer to:

== Places ==
- Coram's Fields, an area of open space in London
- Coram, New York, a hamlet in Suffolk County
- Coram, Montana, a place in Flathead County
- Coram Experimental Forest, within the Flathead National Forest, near Kalispell, Montana

== People ==
- Thomas Coram (1668–1751), English philanthropist
- Coram (c. 1883–1937), English music hall ventriloquist and singer; real name: Thomas Mitchell

== Other uses ==
- Coram, working name of the Thomas Coram Foundation for Children, an English charity
- Coram nobis, legal term, a petition to the court
- Coram non judice, legal term
- Professor Coram, a character in Arthur Conan Doyle's Sherlock Holmes short story "The Adventure of the Golden Pince-Nez"
- Farder Coram, a character in Philip Pullman's His Dark Materials trilogy

== See also ==
- Coram Deo (disambiguation)
- Corum (disambiguation)
