= Jaylen Watson =

American football player (born 1998)

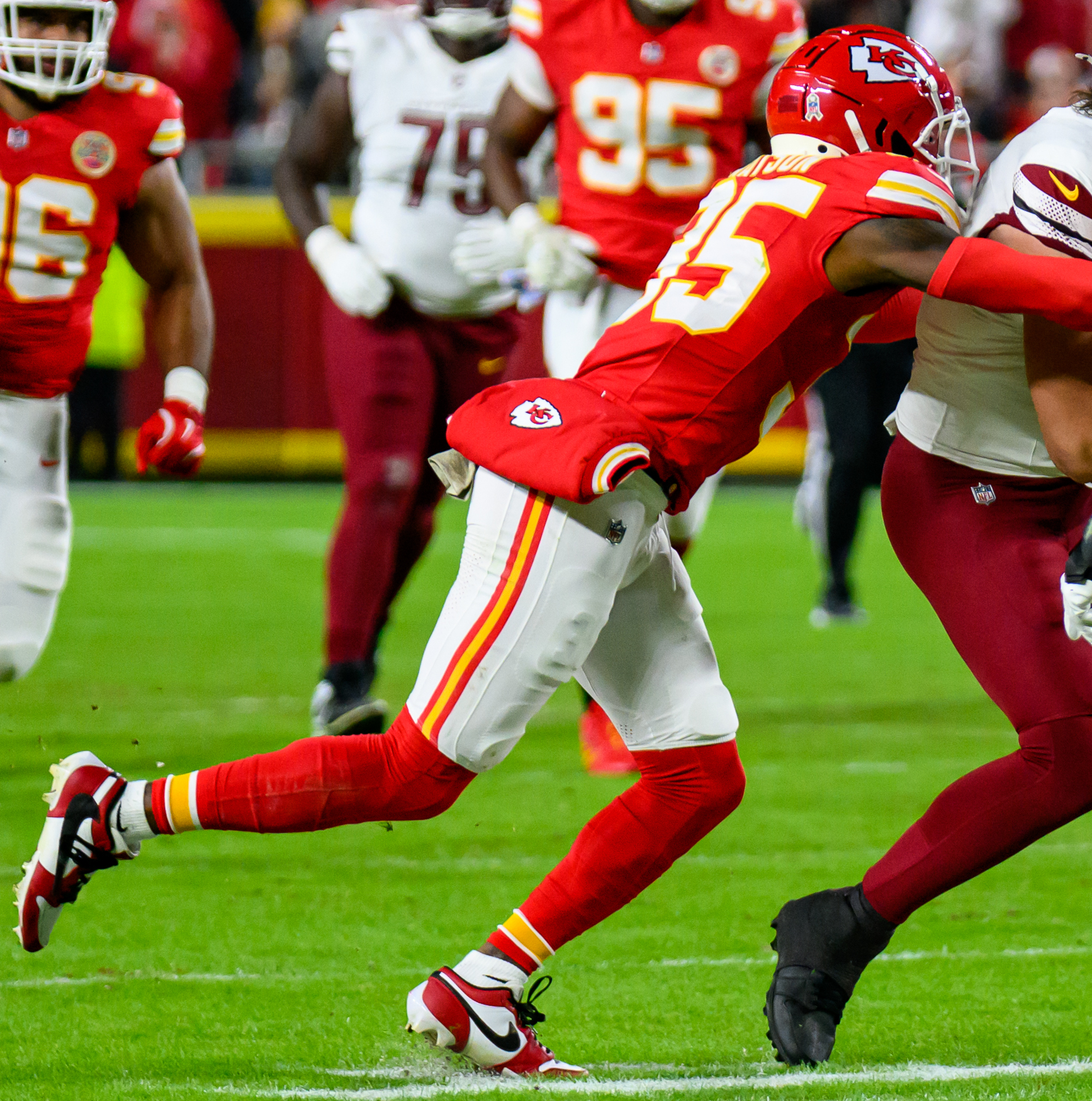
- Watson with the Kansas City Chiefs in 2025

No. 35 – Los Angeles Rams
- Position: Cornerback
- Roster status: Injured reserve

Personal information
- Born: September 17, 1998 (age 28); Augusta, Georgia, U.S.
- Listed height: 6 ft 2 in (1.88 m)
- Listed weight: 197 lb (89 kg)

Career information
- High school: Laney (Augusta)
- College: Ventura (2017–2018); Washington State (2020–2021)
- NFL draft: 2022: 7th round, 243rd overall pick

Career history
- Kansas City Chiefs (2022–2025); Los Angeles Rams (2026–present)

Awards and highlights
- 2× Super Bowl champion (LVII, LVIII)

Career NFL statistics as of 2026
- Total tackles: 202
- Sacks: 4
- Pass deflections: 33
- Interceptions: 4
- Defensive touchdowns: 1
- Stats at Pro Football Reference

Jaylen Watson (born September 17, 1998) is an American professional football cornerback for the Los Angeles Rams of the National Football League (NFL). He played college football at Ventura College before transferring to the Washington State Cougars. He was selected by the Kansas City Chiefs in the seventh round of the 2022 NFL draft.

== Early life ==
Watson grew up in Augusta, Georgia and attended Lucy Craft Laney High School as well as Curtis Baptist High School.

== College career ==
Watson began his college career at Ventura College. As a sophomore, he recorded 43 tackles with 13 pass breakups, four interceptions, and one fumble recovery. Watson initially committed to transfer to USC, but did not qualify academically to enroll at the school. He did not play in 2019 and returned to Augusta, where he worked at a local Wendy's restaurant that was managed by his mother while also completing his coursework. Watson later signed to transfer to play at Washington State.

Watson became an immediate starter at cornerback for the Washington State Cougars and was named honorable mention All-Pac-12 Conference after recording 13 tackles, two passes broken up, a forced fumble and one recovered fumble in three games during the team's COVID-19-shortened 2020 season. He repeated as an honorable mention All-Pac 12 selection in his final season.

== Professional career ==
=== Pre-draft ===
Cory Giddings of Bleacher Report had Watson ranked as the 28th best cornerback prospect (235th overall) in the draft. WalterFootball.com ranked him as the 18th best cornerback prospect in the draft. NFL draft analysts projections for Watson vastly varied from as early to the third round to as late as the seventh round with even some projecting him to go undrafted. NFL.com lead analyst Lance Zierlein projected him to go undrafted, but be signed as a priority undrafted free agent.

Pre-draft measurables
Height	Weight	Arm length	Hand span	Wingspan	40-yard dash	10-yard split	20-yard split	20-yard shuttle	Three-cone drill	Vertical jump	Broad jump	Bench press
6 ft 2 in (1.88 m)	197 lb (89 kg)	32 1/4 in (0.82 m)	9 5/8 in (0.24 m)	6 ft 4 1/2 in (1.94 m)	4.49 s	1.60 s	2.60 s	4.22 s	7.15 s	38.0 in (0.97 m)	11 ft 0 in (3.35 m)	18 reps
All values from NFL Combine/Pro Day

=== Kansas City Chiefs ===
==== 2022 ====
The Kansas City Chiefs selected Watson in the seventh round (243rd overall) of the 2022 NFL draft. He was the 36th cornerback drafted and the third cornerback drafted by the Chiefs in 2022, following first round selection (21st overall) Trent McDuffie and fourth round selection (135th overall) Joshua Williams. The Chiefs drafted them in order to provide depth following the departures of Charvarius Ward and Mike Hughes.

External videos
- Chiefs select Jaylen Watson No. 243
- Charles Davis breaks down Jaylen Watson

On May 6, 2022, the Kansas City Chiefs signed Watson to a four–year, $3.74 million rookie contract that includes a signing bonus of $85,372.

Throughout training camp, he competed to be a starting cornerback against Trent McDuffie, Joshua Williams, Deandre Baker, and Rashad Fenton under defensive coordinator Steve Spagnuolo. Head coach Andy Reid named Watson a backup and listed him as the fourth cornerback on the depth chart to begin the season, behind L'Jarius Sneed, Trent McDuffie, and Rashad Fenton.

On September 11, 2022, Watson made his professional regular season debut in the Kansas City Chiefs' season-opener at the Arizona Cardinals and had two tackles and one pass deflection during their 44–21 victory. On September 13, 2022, the Chiefs placed Trent McDuffie on injured reserve due to a hamstring injury he sustained in Week 1. Watson was subsequently promoted to the third cornerback on the depth chart and was appointed as the starting nickelback. On September 15, 2022, Watson earned his first career start as a nickelback against the Los Angeles Chargers on Thursday Night Football and made four combined tackles (three solo), one pass deflection, and scored his first career touchdown on a pick-six after picking off a pass attempt thrown by Justin Herbert in the endzone to tight end Gerald Everett and returned it for a 99–yard touchdown during their 27–24 victory. His performance earned him the AFC Defensive Player of the Week. He was inactive as a healthy scratch during the Chiefs' 24–27 loss at the Cincinnati Bengals in Week 13. In Week 17, he set a season-high with seven combined tackles (six solo) as the Chiefs defeated the Denver Broncos 27–24. He finished his rookie season with a total of 49 combined tackles (37 solo), six passes defended, one interception, and one touchdown in 16 games and six starts. He received an overall grade of 57.0 from Pro Football Focus as a rookie in 2022.

The Kansas City Chiefs finished the 2022 NFL season first in the AFC West with a 14–3 record, clinching a first-round bye. On January 21, 2023, Watson started in his first career playoff game and made four solo tackles, two pass deflections, and helped secure a 27–20 victory against the Jacksonville Jaguars in the AFC Divisional Round by intercepting a pass attempt by Trevor Lawrence to wide receiver Zay Jones with 3:54 remaining in the fourth quarter. On January 29, 2023, Watson started in the AFC Championship Game against the Cincinnati Bengals and had four solo tackles, two pass deflections, and intercepted a pass by Joe Burrow to wide receiver Tee Higgins during a 23–20 victory to advance to the Super Bowl. On February 12, 2023, Watson started in Super Bowl LVII and recorded three solo tackles in the Chiefs' 38–35 victory over the Philadelphia Eagles. He earned the first Super Bowl ring of his career.

==== 2023 ====
Throughout training camp, Watson competed against Joshua Williams to be the third cornerback on the depth chart. Head coach Andy Reid named him a backup to begin the season and listed him as the fourth cornerback on the depth chart behind Trent McDuffie, L'Jarius Sneed, and Joshua Williams.

He was inactive for the Chiefs' 23–20 victory at the New York Jets due to a shoulder injury. On November 5, 2023, Watson made five combined tackles (three solo) and made his first career sack on Tua Tagovailoa for a seven–yard loss during a 21–14 victory against the Miami Dolphins. In Week 18, he set a season-high with eight solo tackles and made two pass deflections during a 13–12 victory at the Los Angeles Chargers. He finished the season with a total of 33 combined tackles (28 solo), six passes defended, and a career-high two sacks in 16 games and two starts. He received an overall grade of 68.5 from Pro Football Focus in 2023.He received an overall grade of 82.1 from Pro Football Focus in 2023.

The Kansas City Chiefs finished the 2023 NFL season atop the AFC West with a record of 11–6. They defeated the Miami Dolphins 26–7 in the AFC Wild-Card Game, then had a 27–24 victory at the Buffalo Bills in the Divisional Round, and then had a 17–10 victory in the AFC Championship Game at the Baltimore Ravens. On February 11, 2024, Watson made two solo tackles and had a fumble recovery on a muffed punt as the Chiefs defeated the San Francisco 49ers in overtime 25–22 to win Super Bowl LVIII.

==== 2024 ====
Watson entered training camp as a possible candidate to be the No. 2 starting cornerback following the departure of L'Jarius Sneed. Defensive coordinator Steve Spagnuolo held a competition between Watson, Joshua Williams, and Nazeeh Johnson. Head coach Andy Reid named Watson a starting cornerback to begin the season and paired him with No. 1 starting cornerback Trent McDuffie.

On September 5, 2024, Watson started in the Kansas City Chiefs' home-opener against the Baltimore Ravens and set a career-high with 11 combined tackles (seven solo) and made one pass deflection during their 27–20 victory. In Week 3, he made four combined tackles (two solo), a pass deflection, and during the second quarter quarterback Kirk Cousins threw a pass to Kyle Pitts that was intercepted by safety Chamarri Conner who lateraled it to Watson for another 12–yards as they had a 22–17 victory at the Atlanta Falcons. On October 20, Watson had three combined tackles (two solo) before exiting in the third quarter of a 28–18 victory at the San Francisco 49ers after suffering a leg injury. On October 22, the Chiefs officially placed him on injured reserve after it was revealed that he had a broken fibula and tibia and would undergo surgery and remain inactive for the 11 remaining games (Weeks 8–18). He finished the season with 32 combined tackles (21 solo) and six pass deflections in six games and six starts. He received an overall grade of 72.6 from Pro Football Focus, which ranked 41st among 222 qualifying cornerbacks in 2024.

The Kansas City Chiefs finished the 2024 NFL season with a 15–2 record and clinched a first-round bye after finishing first in the AFC West. On January 17, 2025, the Chiefs activated Watson from injured reserve and added him back to their active roster for the playoffs. On January 26, he made three combined tackles (two solo) as the Chiefs defeated the Buffalo Bills 32–29 in the AFC Championship Game. On February 9, Watson started in Super Bowl LIX, but was limited to one solo tackle as the Chiefs lost 22–40 against the Philadelphia Eagles.

==== 2025 ====
Watson started all 15 games he appeared in during the 2025 season, setting new single season highs in total tackles (64: 42 combined, 22 solo) and interceptions (two), and matching highs in pass deflections (six) and sacks (two). On December 24, 2025, Watson was placed on season-ending injured reserve due to a groin injury and missed the Chiefs' final two regular season games.

=== Los Angeles Rams ===
==== 2026 ====
On March 11, 2026, Watson signed a three-year, $51 million contract with the Los Angeles Rams.

== NFL career statistics ==
Legend
	Won the Super Bowl
	Led the league
**Bold**	Career high

=== Regular season ===
Year	Team	Games		Tackles					Fumbles				Interceptions					
Year	Team	GP	GS	Cmb	Solo	Ast	Sck	TFL	FF	FR	Yds	TD	Int	Yds	Avg	Lng	TD	PD
2022	KC	16	6	49	37	12	0.0	**3**	0	0	0	0	1	**99**	**99.0**	**99**	**1**	**6**
2023	KC	16	2	33	28	5	**2.0**	2	0	0	0	0	0	0	0.0	0	0	**6**
2024	KC	6	6	32	21	11	0.0	0	0	0	0	0	0	12	12.0	12	0	**6**
2025	KC	15	15	**64**	**42**	**22**	**2.0**	**3**	0	0	0	0	**2**	14	7.0	14	0	**6**
2026	LAR	7	7	24	14	10	0.0	2	0	0	0	0	1	3	3.0	3	0	9
Career		60	36	202	142	60	4.0	10	0	0	0	0	4	128	32.0	99	1	33

=== Postseason ===
Year	Team	Games		Tackles					Fumbles				Interceptions					
Year	Team	GP	GS	Cmb	Solo	Ast	Sck	TFL	FF	FR	Yds	TD	Int	Yds	Avg	Lng	TD	PD
2022	KC	3	3	**11**	**11**	0	0.0	0	0	0	0	0	**2**	**11**	**5.5**	**10**	0	**4**
2023	KC	4	0	7	7	0	0.0	0	0	**1**	**3**	0	0	0	0.0	0	0	1
2024	KC	3	1	5	4	**1**	0.0	0	0	0	0	0	0	0	0.0	0	0	1
Career		10	4	23	22	1	0.0	0	0	1	3	0	2	11	5.5	10	0	6
