= 2026 Los Angeles Rams season =

89th season in franchise history

- Owner: Stan Kroenke
- General manager: Les Snead
- President: Kevin Demoff
- Head coach: Sean McVay
- Offensive coordinator: Nathan Scheelhaase
- Defensive coordinator: Chris Shula
- Home stadium: SoFi Stadium

Results
- Record: 6–4
- Division place: 3rd NFC West

Uniform
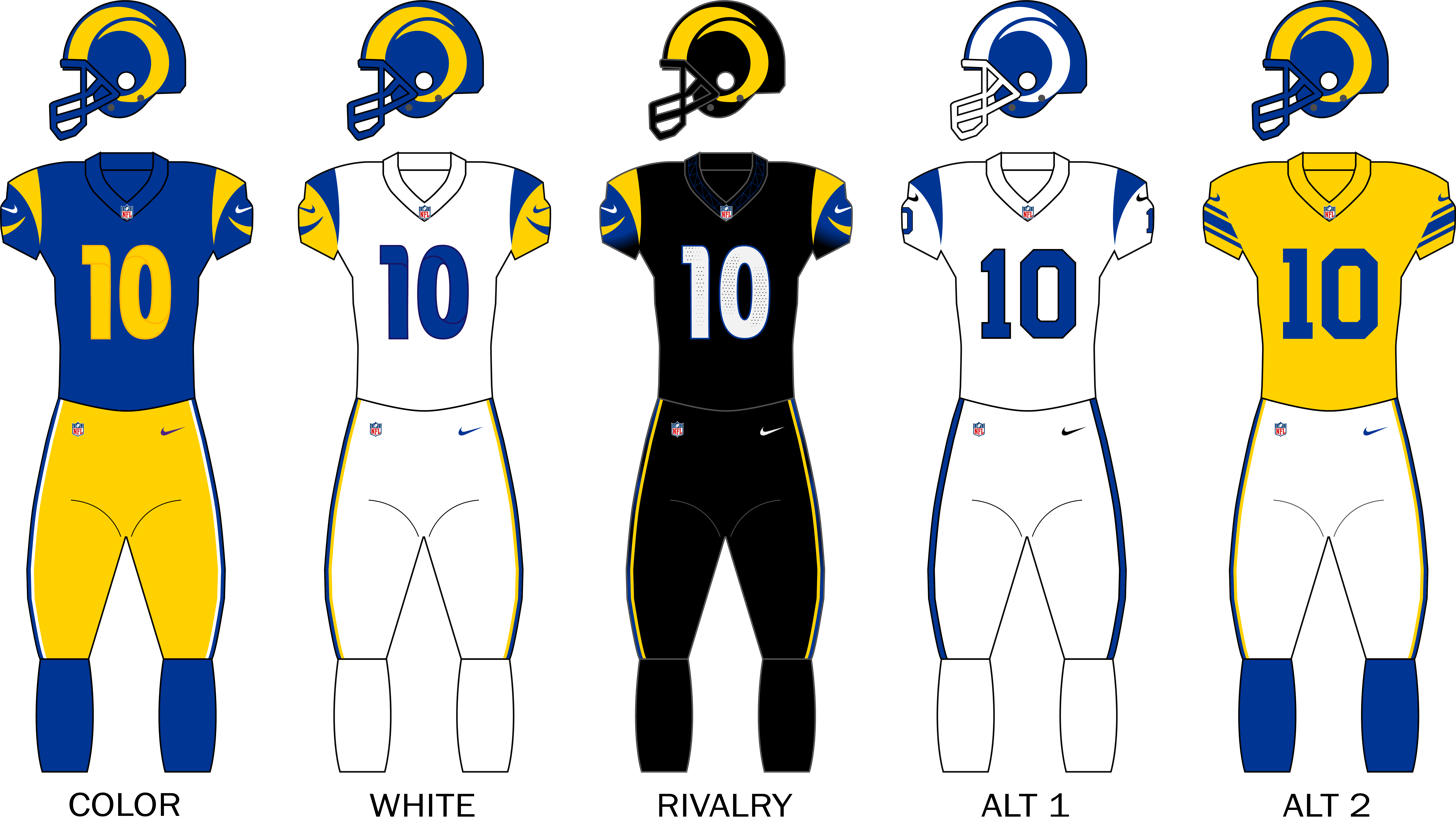

The 2026 season is the Los Angeles Rams' 89th in the National Football League (NFL), their 90th overall, 60th in the Greater Los Angeles Area, seventh playing their home games at SoFi Stadium and their 10th under head coach Sean McVay. The Rams will seek to improve upon their 12–5 record from the previous season, make the playoffs for the fourth consecutive year, and reclaim the NFC West title. This will be the first season since 2022 without Mike LaFleur as offensive coordinator, as he departed to become the head coach of the Arizona Cardinals. While active in free agency, the Rams also made several high-profile trades to improve their defense, first acquiring All-Pro cornerback Trent McDuffie from the Kansas City Chiefs in March, then in June trading with the Cleveland Browns for edge rusher Myles Garrett, the reigning NFL Defensive Player of the Year. Later in August, former three-time Defensive Player of the Year Aaron Donald came out of retirement to join the team. If the Rams lose one more time, they will fail to improve on their 12–5 record from the previous season.

During the offseason, the Rams introduced a new primary logo and modified uniforms, removing the gradients, and eliminating the "bone" jersey and pants that had been introduced in 2020. In July, the team also unveiled new alternate uniforms, one of which replicated the uniforms won by L.A.'s 1951 NFL Championship team, while the other evoked the memory of the famed Fearsome Foursome defensive line of the late 1960s.

== Offseason ==
=== Coaching changes ===
- Ray "Bubba" Ventrone, who had previously served as special teams coordinator for the Cleveland Browns and Indianapolis Colts, was hired to serve in the same capacity for the Rams on January 29, 2026.
- Mike LaFleur, the Rams' offensive coordinator for the previous three seasons, was hired as the new head coach of the Arizona Cardinals on February 1, 2026.
- Kyle Hoke, who was Ventrone's assistant with Cleveland in 2025, also came over to the Rams as assistant special teams coach, it was announced on February 2, 2026.
- Kliff Kingsbury, the former Arizona Cardinals head coach who had most recently served as offensive coordinator for the Washington Commanders, was hired by the Rams to join the coaching staff on February 6, 2026. Unspecified at the time of his hire, Kingsbury was later announced as assistant head coach, replacing Aubrey Pleasant, who was not retained.
- Nathan Scheelhaase, who had served as the Rams' pass game coordinator for two seasons, was elevated to offensive coordinator, succeeding the departed Mike LaFleur, on February 20, 2026.

On February 23, 2026, the Rams announced their coaching staff for the 2026 season, with the following changes and additions:

- Brian Allen, who played six seasons for Los Angeles and had spent the previous season with the Rams as a consultant, was added to the full-time coaching staff as an assistant offensive line coach.
- After two seasons as an offensive assistant, Rob Calabrese was elevated to wide receivers coach, succeeding Eric Yarber, who was promoted to senior offensive assistant/wide receivers.
- Senior defensive assistant Jimmy Lake added the title and responsibility of pass game coordinator, inheriting the position previously held by Aubrey Pleasant.
- Michael Hunter, a former cornerback for the New York Giants, was hired as an assistant defensive backs coach after holding similar positions in college, most recently at Ohio State.
- Brian Johnson who had served as the assistant head coach/pass game coordinator for the Washington Commanders the previous two seasons, was hired as senior offensive assistant. In that position, he succeeds Alex Van Pelt, who departed the Rams to become quarterbacks coach for the Atlanta Falcons.
- Quarterbacks coach Dave Ragone was retained and added the title of associate coordinator.
- Former wide receiver Robert Woods, who played five seasons with the Rams from 2017 to 2021, was added as an assistant wide receivers coach shortly after retiring as a player.
- Robert Wright, who had spent more than 10 years as an assistant coach on the college level (most recently as Syracuse's co-defensive coordinator/linebackers coach), was hired by the Rams as a defensive assistant.

=== Trades ===
Trades below are only for trades that included a player. Draft pick-only trades will go in the draft section.

Date	Player(s)/Asset(s) received	Team	Player(s)/Asset(s) traded	Source
March 11	CB Trent McDuffie	Kansas City Chiefs	2026 1st round selection (No. 29), 2026 5th round selection (No. 169), 2026 6th round selection (No. 210), 2027 3rd round selection (TBD)	
June 1	DE Myles Garrett	Cleveland Browns	DE Jared Verse, 2027 1st round selection (TBD), 2028 2nd round selection (TBD), 2029 3rd round selection (TBD)	

=== Draft ===
2026 Los Angeles Rams draft selections
Round	Selection	Player	Position	College	Notes
1	13	Ty Simpson	QB	Alabama	From Falcons
1	29	Traded to the Kansas City Chiefs			
2	61	Max Klare	TE	Ohio State	
3	93	Keagen Trost	OT	Missouri	
4	129	Traded to the Chicago Bears			
5	144	Traded to the Tennessee Titans			From Titans
5	169	Traded to the Kansas City Chiefs			
6	197	CJ Daniels	WR	Miami (FL)	From Eagles
6	207	Traded to the Philadelphia Eagles			From Texans via Rams and Titans
6	210	Traded to the Kansas City Chiefs			
7	232	Tim Keenan III	DT	Alabama	
7	245	Traded to the Houston Texans			
7	251	Traded to the Philadelphia Eagles			Compensatory selection
7	252	Traded to the Philadelphia Eagles			Compensatory selection

2026 Los Angeles Rams undrafted free agents
Name	Position	College	Ref.
Nick Andersen	S	Wake Forest	
Wesley Bailey	OLB	Louisville	
Austin Blaske	OL	North Carolina	
Matthew Caldwell	QB	Texas	
Dean Connors	RB	Houston	
Nyzier Fourqurean	CB	Wisconsin	
Al'zillion Hamilton	CB	Fresno State	
Bryce Henderson	OL	Vanderbilt	
Nikhai Hill-Green	ILB	Alabama	
Rohan Jones	TE	Arkansas	
Chad Lindberg	OL	North Carolina	
Jalen Logan-Redding	DL	Minnesota	
Jaxson Moi	DL	Tennessee	
Drey Norwood	CB	Missouri	
Darryl Peterson III	OLB	Wisconsin	
Dan Villari	TE	Syracuse	
Eddie Walls III	OLB	Houston	
Peyton Zdroik	DL	Air Force	

== Staff ==
Los Angeles Rams staff
Front office: Owner/CEO – Stan Kroenke; President – Kevin Demoff; General manager – Les Snead; Assistant general manager – John McKay; COO – Tony Pastoors; Senior advisor to general manager – Ray Farmer; Senior personnel executive & deputy chief of college scouting staff – Taylor Morton; Senior personnel executives – Marty Barrett, Ted Monago, Chris Driggers, Phil Savage; Senior scouting executive – Billy Johnson; Director of pro personnel – Matt Waugh; Director, scouting, strategy & analytics – Nicole Blake; Head coaches: Head coach – Sean McVay; Assistant head coach – Kliff Kingsbury; Offensive coaches: Offensive coordinator – Nathan Scheelhaase; Associate coordinator/quarterbacks – Dave Ragone; Running backs – Ron Gould; Wide receivers – Rob Calabrese; Assistant wide receivers – Robert Woods; Tight ends – Scott Huff; Assistant tight ends/game management coordinator – Dan Shamash; Offensive line – Ryan Wendell; Assistant offensive line – Brian Allen; Assistant offensive line – Zak Kromer; Senior offensive assistant – Brian Johnson; Senior offensive assistant/wide receivers – Eric Yarber	Defensive coaches: Defensive coordinator – Chris Shula; Defensive line/run game coordinator – Giff Smith; Outside linebackers – Joe Coniglio; Inside linebackers – Greg Williams; Defensive backs/pass game coordinator – Jimmy Lake; Safeties – Chris Beake; Assistant defensive backs – Michael Hunter; Pass rush coordinator – Drew Wilkins; Senior defensive assistant – Robert Wright; Special teams coaches: Special teams coordinator – Ray Ventrone; Assistant special teams coach – Kyle Hoke; Strength and conditioning: Director of strength training and performance – Justin Lovett; Assistant strength and conditioning – Dustin Woods; → Coaching staff → Front office → More NFL staffs

== Current roster ==
Los Angeles Rams roster
Quarterbacks (QB): 13 Stetson Bennett; 15 Ty Simpson; 9 Matthew Stafford; Running backs (RB): 24 Blake Corum; 20 Ronnie Rivers; 23 Kyren Williams; Wide receivers (WR): 8 Tutu Atwell; 6 CJ Daniels; 4 Konata Mumpfield; 14 Xavier Smith; Tight ends (TE): 87 Davis Allen; 89 Tyler Higbee; 86 Max Klare; 84 Colby Parkinson	Offensive linemen (OL): 73 Steve Avila G; 69 Kevin Dotson G; 77 Alaric Jackson T; 50 Beaux Limmer G; 71 Warren McClendon T; 66 Bill Murray G; 68 David Quessenberry T; 65 Coleman Shelton C; 79 Keagen Trost T; Defensive linemen (DL): 90 Tyler Davis DE; 99 Aaron Donald DE; 55 Braden Fiske DE; 57 Ty Hamilton NT; 52 Larrell Murchison DE	Linebackers (LB): 47 Wesley Bailey OLB; 56 Shaun Dolac ILB; 95 Myles Garrett OLB; 94 Desjuan Johnson OLB; 53 Nate Landman ILB; 59 Darryl Peterson III OLB; 48 Omar Speights ILB; 10 Josaiah Stewart OLB; 44 Grant Stuard ILB; 0 Byron Young OLB; Defensive backs (DB): 3 Kamren Curl S; 1 Emmanuel Forbes CB; 5 Kamren Kinchens S; 37 Quentin Lake S; 21 Cam Lampkin CB; 2 Jaylen McCollough S; 22 Trent McDuffie CB; 36 Maximus Pulley S; 30 Josh Wallace CB; Special teams (ST): 49 Joe Cardona LS; 42 Ethan Evans P; 16 Joshua Karty K; 19 Brandon McManus K	Practice squad: 45 Nick Andersen S; 11 Alex Bachman WR; 14 Jack Bouwmeester P (IPP); 25 Nyzier Fourqurean CB; 72 Blake Hance G; 34 Tanner Ingle S; 27 David Long CB; 54 Eric Kendricks LB; 43 Jake McQuaide LS; 98 Jaxson Moi DT; 93 Bill Norton DE; 81 Brennan Presley WR; 58 Jon Rhattigan ILB; 82 Tyler Scott WR; 83 Dan Villari TE; 32 Jordan Waters RB; 26 Damarion Williams CB; Reserve: 17 Davante Adams WR (IR); 2 Matthew Caldwell QB (IR); 33 Dean Connors RB (IR); 67 Justin Dedich G (IR); 18 Terrance Ferguson TE (IR); 97 Poona Ford NT (IR); 19 Blake Grupe K (IR); 63 Dylan McMahon C (IR); 12 Puka Nacua WR (IR); 91 Kobie Turner DE (IR); 51 Eddie Walls III OLB (IR); 35 Jaylen Watson CB (IR); 88 Jordan Whittington KR (IR) 51 active, 16 practice squad (1 IPP), 13 reserve As of November 17, 2026. Rookies in italics.; Roster; Depth chart; Transactions

== Preseason ==
The Rams' preseason opponents and schedule was announced on May 14—in conjunction with the release of the regular season schedule.

Week	Date	Opponent	Result	Record	Venue	Recap
1	August 15	at Kansas City Chiefs	W 20–12	1–0	Arrowhead Stadium	Recap
2	August 22	New Orleans Saints	W 34–0	2–0	SoFi Stadium	Recap
3	August 27	at Los Angeles Chargers	W 20–18	3–0	SoFi Stadium	Recap

== Regular season ==
=== Schedule ===
On February 5, the NFL announced that the Rams would host the San Francisco 49ers at the Melbourne Cricket Ground in Melbourne, as part of the NFL International Series. One day before the NFL schedule release, it was announced that the Rams will host the Green Bay Packers at SoFi Stadium in the inaugural Thanksgiving Eve game. Both games are exclusive to KNBC-TV in the Los Angeles market.

Week	Date	Time (PT)	Opponent	Result	Record	Venue	Network	Recap
1	September 10 (Note: September 11, 10:35 a.m. Australian Eastern Time Zone)	5:35 p.m.	**San Francisco 49ers**	**L** 7–27	0–1	(Australia) Melbourne Cricket Ground (Melbourne)	Netflix	Recap
2	September 21	5:15 p.m.	New York Giants	**W** 28–6	1–1	SoFi Stadium	ESPN/ABC	Recap
3	September 27	5:20 p.m.	at Denver Broncos	**L** 26–30	1–2	Empower Field at Mile High	NBC	Recap
4	October 4	10:00 a.m.	at Philadelphia Eagles	**W** 24–20	2–2	Lincoln Financial Field	Fox	Recap
5	October 12	5:15 p.m.	Buffalo Bills	**L** 34–37 (OT)	2–3	SoFi Stadium	ESPN/ABC	Recap
6	October 18	1:05 p.m.	**Arizona Cardinals**	**L** 16–18	2–4	SoFi Stadium	Fox	Recap
7	October 25	1:25 p.m.	at Las Vegas Raiders	**W** 35–21	3–4	Allegiant Stadium	Fox	Recap
8	November 1	1:05 p.m.	Los Angeles Chargers	**W** 24–9	4–4	SoFi Stadium	Fox	Recap
9	November 8	10:00 a.m.	at Washington Commanders	**W** 20–13	5–4	Northwest Stadium	Fox	Recap
10	November 15	1:05 p.m.	at **Arizona Cardinals**	**W** 34–6	6–4	State Farm Stadium	CBS	Recap
11	Bye							
12	November 25	5:00 p.m.	Green Bay Packers			SoFi Stadium	Netflix	
13	December 3	5:15 p.m.	Kansas City Chiefs			SoFi Stadium	Prime Video	
14	December 13	1:25 p.m.	at **San Francisco 49ers**			Levi's Stadium	Fox	
15	December 20	1:25 p.m.	Dallas Cowboys			SoFi Stadium	CBS	
16	December 25	5:15 p.m.	at **Seattle Seahawks**			Lumen Field	Fox	
17	January 2/3	TBD	at Tampa Bay Buccaneers			Raymond James Stadium	TBD	
18	January 9/10	TBD	**Seattle Seahawks**			SoFi Stadium	TBD	

Notes

- Intra-division opponents are in **bold** text.
- Networks, dates and times for games in Weeks 14 and 15 are subject to change as a result of flexible scheduling; Week 16 is exempt.
- The date, time and network for Week 17 will be finalized by no later than the end of Week 15.
- The date, time and network for Week 18 will be finalized at the end of Week 17.

=== Game summaries ===
==== Week 1: vs. San Francisco 49ers ====
NFL International Series

Week 1: San Francisco 49ers at Los Angeles Rams – Game summary

Quarter	1	2	3	4	Total
**49ers**	3	7	7	10	**27**
Rams	0	7	0	0	**7**

at Melbourne Cricket Ground, Melbourne, Australia

- Date: September 10
- Game time: 5:35 p.m. PDT
- Game weather: Sunny, 57 °F (14 °C)
- Game attendance: 100,021
- Referee: Alex Kemp
- TV announcers (Netflix): Noah Eagle, Luke Kuechly, MJ Acosta-Ruiz, and Tom Pelissero
  Game exclusive to KNBC and KNTV.
- Recap, Game Book

Game information

**First quarter**

- SF – Eddy Pineiro 20-yard field goal, 6:15. 49ers 3–0. **Drive: 15 plays, 65 yards, 7:13.**

**Second quarter**

- LAR – Kyren Williams 5-yard run (Harrison Mevis kick), 14:57. Rams 7–3. **Drive: 4 plays, 57 yards, 1:55.**
- SF – Demarcus Robinson 39-yard pass from Brock Purdy (Eddy Pineiro kick), 4:28. 49ers 10–7. **Drive: 9 plays, 86 yards, 4:24.**

**Third quarter**

- SF – Mike Evans 2-yard pass from Brock Purdy (Eddy Pineiro kick), 11:03. 49ers 17–7. **Drive: 7 plays, 51 yards, 3:57.**

**Fourth quarter**

- SF – Deebo Samuel 15-yard pass from Brock Purdy (Eddy Pineiro kick), 12:57. 49ers 24–7. **Drive: 11 plays, 99 yards, 5:44.**
- SF – Eddy Pineiro 56-yard field goal, 9:43. 49er7-3 (s 27–7. **Drive: 4 plays, 5 yards, 1:25.**

**Top passers**

- SF – Brock Purdy – 25/34, 205 yards, 3 TD, INT
- LAR – Matthew Stafford – 15/25, 155 yards, INT

**Top rushers**

- SF – Christian McCaffrey – 10 rushes, 68 yards
- LAR – Blake Corum – 10 rushes, 54 yards

**Top receivers**

- SF – Demarcus Robinson – 2 receptions, 50 yards, TD
- LAR – Puka Nacua – 5 receptions, 74 yards

Emerging from the offseason as presumptive Super Bowl favorites, the Rams looked anything but that in a lackluster performance against the NFC West rival 49ers in the first NFL International Series game ever played in Australia. After punting on its first two drives, Los Angeles drove early in the second quarter to what would be its lone score of the day, a 1-yard touchdown run by running back Kyren Williams that was set up by a 41-yard reception by wide receiver Puka Nacua. With the Rams up 7–3, the teams traded interceptions before San Francisco took the lead for good 10–7 on Brock Purdy's 39-yard touchdown pass to wide receiver (and former Ram) DeMarcus Robinson with 4:35 remaining in the first half. After San Francisco increased its lead to 17–7 on its opening drive of the third period with Purdy tossing a 2-yard TD pass to new wide receiver Mike Evans, the Rams responded by driving 72 yards in 12 plays to the San Francisco 1. But on fourth-and-goal, quarterback Matthew Stafford was stopped short of the end zone and Los Angeles turned over the ball on downs. The 49ers then responded with a methodical 11-play drive that covered 99 yards and ended with Purdy's third touchdown of the day, a 15-yard strike to wide receiver Deebo Samuel. San Francisco kicker Eddie Pineiro added his second field goal of the game late in the fourth quarter to complete the scoring. For the Rams, Stafford completed 15 of 25 passes for 155 yards and an interception, while Nacua had five receptions for 74 yards. Running back Blake Corum had 54 yards on 10 carries to lead the Rams on the ground. Safety Quentin Lake had a team-high 10 tackles (seven unassisted) and an interception on defense. The day marked a disappointing debut for reigning NFL Defensive Player of the Year Myles Garrett, who started at outside linebacker and played in 40 of 65 possible defensive snaps but recorded no statistics during the game. With the upset loss, the Rams started their season 0–1. This game was also the NFL debut for Rams backup quarterback Stetson Bennett IV, who completed two of three passes for 13 yards and rushing once for nine yards while playing in the game's final minutes.

==== Week 2: vs. New York Giants ====
Week 2: New York Giants at Los Angeles Rams – Game summary

Quarter	1	2	3	4	Total
Giants	0	3	3	0	**6**
**Rams**	7	7	7	7	**28**

at SoFi Stadium, Inglewood, California

- Date: September 21
- Game time: 5:15 p.m. PDT
- Game weather: Sunny, 76 °F (24 °C) (fixed roof)
- Game attendance: 73,773
- Referee: Brad Allen
- TV announcers (ESPN/ABC): Joe Buck, Troy Aikman, Lisa Salters, and Laura Rutledge
- Recap, Game Book

Game information

**First quarter**

- LAR – Davante Adams 31-yard pass from Matthew Stafford (Harrison Mevis kick), 0:11. Rams 7–0. **Drive: 8 plays, 80 yards, 5:24.**

**Second quarter**

- LAR – Kyren Williams 10-yard pass from Matthew Stafford (Harrison Mevis kick), 11:07. Rams 14–0. **Drive: 6 plays, 78 yards, 3:28.**
- NYG – Dominic Zvada 24-yard field goal, 0:25. Rams 14–3. **Drive: 4 plays, 5 yards, 2:41.**

**Third quarter**

- LAR – Davante Adams 11-yard pass from Matthew Stafford (Harrison Mevis kick), 6:21. Rams 21–3. **Drive: 7 plays, 86 yards, 3:35.**
- NYG – Dominic Zvada 52-yard field goal, 3:49. Rams 21–6. **Drive: 7 plays, 18 yards, 2:32.**

**Fourth quarter**

- LAR – Terrance Ferguson 5-yard pass from Matthew Stafford (Harrison Mevis kick), 8:57. Rams 28–6. **Drive: 9 plays, 64 yards, 5:36.**

**Top passers**

- NYG – Jameis Winston – 11/27, 111 yards, INT
- LAR – Matthew Stafford – 22/31, 327 yards, 4 TD, INT

**Top rushers**

- NYG – Cam Skattebo – 12 rushes, 36 yards
- LAR – Kyren Williams – 12 rushes, 85 yards

**Top receivers**

- NYG – Darnell Mooney – 2 receptions, 48 yards
- LAR – Davante Adams – 8 receptions, 195 yards, 2 TD

Wide receiver Davante Adams had his most productive day in a Rams uniform, catching eight passes for 195 yards in leading Los Angeles to a convincing home-opening victory on Monday Night Football. His first big play came late in the first quarter on a 19-yard pass from quarterback Matthew Stafford to push the Rams into Giants territory for the first time. Then, three plays later, Stafford and Adams connected again on a 31-yard touchdown pass over the middle to finish off an eight-play, 80-yard scoring drive. After forcing a New York punt, L.A. went 78 yards in six plays with Stafford hitting running back Kyren Williams with a 10-yard scoring toss. Adams and Stafford connected again, this time with an 11-yard touchdown on a fade route on the seventh play of an 86-yard drive. Stafford's fourth and final touchdown pass of the night came on a 5-yard score to tight enter Terrance Ferguson in the back of the end zone. With his 22nd four-touchdown game, Stafford surpassed Philip Rivers for sixth place all-time in career touchdown passes and his 69th 300-yard passing game is seventh-best all-time. Running backs Williams and Blake Corum shared the workload on the ground with both carrying the ball 12 times for 85 and 79 yards, respectively. On defense, inside linebacker Nate Landman led the Rams with seven tackles and cornerback Trent McDuffie added two tackles, four pass deflections and an interception. Also notable was the return of defensive tackle Aaron Donald, who had three tackles including one for loss in his first game back since ending his two-year retirement.

==== Week 3: at Denver Broncos ====
Week 3: Los Angeles Rams at Denver Broncos – Game summary

Quarter	1	2	3	4	Total
Rams	7	9	0	10	**26**
**Broncos**	0	0	16	14	**30**

at Empower Field at Mile High, Denver, Colorado

- Date: September 27
- Game time: 6:20 p.m. MDT/5:20 p.m. PDT
- Game weather: Mostly cloudy, 83 °F (28 °C)
- Game attendance: 76,333
- Referee: Bill Vinovich
- TV announcers (NBC): Mike Tirico, Cris Collinsworth and Melissa Stark
- Recap, Game Book

Game information

**First quarter**

- LAR – Tyler Higbee 5-yard pass from Matthew Stafford (Harrison Mevis kick), 4:55. Rams 7–0. **Drive: 11 plays, 63 yards, 4:32.**

**Second quarter**

- LAR – Harrison Mevis 36-yard field goal, 13:17. Rams 10–0. **Drive: 7 plays, 49 yards, 3:02.**
- LAR – Harrison Mevis 35-yard field goal, 4:43. Rams 13–0. **Drive: 14 plays, 63 yards, 7:02.**
- LAR – Harrison Mevis 40-yard field goal, 0:00. Rams 16–0. **Drive: 10 plays, 54 yards, 1:07.**

**Third quarter**

- DEN – Pat Bryant 5-yard pass from Bo Nix (Bo Nix–Jaylen Waddle pass), 7:44. Rams 16–8. **Drive: 12 plays, 42 yards, 5:08.**
- DEN – Nate Adkins 8-yard pass from Bo Nix (Bo Nix–Pat Bryant pass), 2:15. Tied 16–16. **Drive: 7 plays, 52 yards, 2:56.**

**Fourth quarter**

- LAR – Harrison Mevis 48-yard field goal, 8:40. Rams 19–16. **Drive: 7 plays, 7 yards, 4:18.**
- DEN – Talanoa Hufanga 66-yard interception return (Wil Lutz kick), 4:49. Broncos 23–19.
- LAR – Konata Mumpfield 48-yard pass from Matthew Stafford (Harrison Mevis kick), 3:38. Rams 26–23. **Drive: 4 plays, 77 yards, 1:11.**
- DEN – Bo Nix 1-yard run (Wil Lutz kick), 0:47. Broncos 30–26. **Drive: 10 plays, 65 yards, 2:51.**

**Top passers**

- LAR – Matthew Stafford – 30/55, 390 yards, 2 TD, 2 INT
- DEN – Bo Nix – 17/34, 186 yards, 2 TD, INT

**Top rushers**

- LAR – Kyren Williams – 15 rushes, 88 yards
- DEN – J. K. Dobbins – 17 rushes, 49 yards

**Top receivers**

- LAR – Davante Adams – 7 receptions, 137 yards
- DEN – Courtland Sutton – 3 receptions, 46 yards

Quarterback Matthew Stafford's final pass as time expired was intercepted in the end zone as the host Broncos escaped with a wild victory on Sunday Night Football. Los Angeles built a 16–0 halftime lead, dominating on both sides of the ball. Tight end Tyler Higbee caught a 5-yard TD pass from Stafford in the first quarter and kicker Harrison Mevis converted three field goals (36, 35, 40), all in the second period. Meanwhile, the Rams' defense limited the Broncos to just 67 yards in total offense during the first two periods. But Denver bounced back in the third quarter with back-to-back touchdown drives followed by successful two-point conversion plays after each score tied the game 16–16. Mevis added a fourth field goal from 48 yards out to give L.A. a three-point lead midway through the fourth quarter. After forcing the Broncos to punt, the Rams drove past midfield and were poised to add to their lead when Stafford threw an interception that was returned by Denver safety Talanoa Hufanga 66 yards for a touchdown. It was the 33rd pick-six thrown by Stafford in his career, breaking a tie he shared with Pro Football Hall of Famer Brett Favre for the most interceptions returned for touchdown in NFL history. But Stafford responded on the next drive by connecting with wide receiver Konata Mumpfield on a 48-yard touchdown pass to put the Rams back on top 26–23. Denver rallied by driving to the goal line, and after a series of questionable officiating calls (Los Angeles was penalized five times on defense in the final two minutes), Broncos quarterback Bo Nix scored from the L.A. 1-yard line with 47 seconds remaining. Starting from their own 33 with just one time out left, the Rams moved quickly with Higbee (eight receptions, 62 yards, 1 TD) and running back Kyren Williams keeping the drive alive with big catches, the last of which put L.A. on the Denver 19 when Hufanga picked off Stafford for the second time to end the game. Williams had 88 yards on 15 rushing attempts while also catching six passes for 70 yards and wide receiver Davante Adams added seven receptions for 137 yards. Linebacker Omar Speights led the defense with six tackles including a sack and a forced fumble in the loss. This was the Rams' first loss to the Broncos since 2002 when they were based in St. Louis.

==== Week 4: at Philadelphia Eagles ====
Week 4: Los Angeles Rams at Philadelphia Eagles – Game summary

Quarter	1	2	3	4	Total
**Rams**	3	7	0	14	**24**
Eagles	3	17	0	0	**20**

at Lincoln Financial Field, Philadelphia, Pennsylvania

- Date: October 4
- Game time: 1:00 p.m. EDT/10:00 a.m. PDT
- Game weather: Rain, 62 °F (17 °C)
- Game attendance: 69,879
- Referee: Craig Wrolstad
- TV announcers (Fox): Kevin Burkhardt, Tom Brady, Erin Andrews and Tom Rinaldi
- Recap, Game Book

Game information

**First quarter**

- PHI – Jake Elliott 29-yard field goal, 8:38. Eagles 3–0. **Drive: 6 plays, 17 yards, 3:10.**
- LAR – Harrison Mevis 40-yard field goal, 2:08. Tied 3–3. **Drive: 13 plays, 58 yards, 6:30.**

**Second quarter**

- PHI – Jake Elliott 56-yard field goal, 10:56. Eagles 6–3. **Drive: 12 plays, 29 yards, 6:12.**
- PHI – Darius Cooper 18-yard pass from Jalen Hurts (Jake Elliott kick), 5:44. Eagles 13–3. **Drive: 2 plays, 17 yards, 0:42.**
- LAR – Puka Nacua 2-yard run (Harrison Mevis kick), 1:55. Eagles 13–10. **Drive: 9 plays, 67 yards, 3:49.**
- PHI – Darius Cooper 10-yard pass from Jalen Hurts (Jake Elliott kick), 0:03. Eagles 20–10. **Drive: 2 plays, 35 yards, 0:15.**

**Third quarter**

- No scoring plays

**Fourth quarter**

- LAR – Kyren Williams 1-yard run (Harrison Mevis kick), 3:59. Eagles 20–17. **Drive: 19 plays, 98 yards, 3:27.**
- LAR – Kyren Williams 7-yard run (Harrison Mevis kick), 1:10. Rams 24–20. **Drive: 10 plays, 79 yards, 1:45.**

**Top passers**

- LAR – Matthew Stafford – 32/51, 317 yards, 2 INT
- PHI – Jalen Hurts – 12/27, 93 yards, 2 TD

**Top rushers**

- LAR – Kyren Williams – 16 rushes, 80 yards, 2 TD
- PHI – Tank Bigsby – 14 rushes, 55 yards

**Top receivers**

- LAR – Puka Nacua – 9 receptions, 125 yards
- PHI – Darius Cooper – 3 receptions, 33 yards, 2 TD

Trailing 20–10 during halftime, the Rams scored 14 unanswered points in the fourth quarter to defeat the host Eagles. Running back Kyren Williams scored two touchdowns in the game's final four minutes to finish off the comeback, which secured L.A.'s first victory over Philadelphia since 2020. Williams had 16 carries for 80 yards rushing and caught a single-game personal best 10 passes for 67 yards. Kicker Harrison Mevis converted a 40-yard field goal attempt in the first quarter and wide receiver Puka Nacua scored on a 2-yard run in the second quarter to bring the Rams to within 13–10 before the Eagles scored a touchdown just before halftime to take a 10-point lead. Quarterback Matthew Stafford threw a pair of interceptions in the first half, but rebounded to throw for 317 yards and engineer the 40th fourth quarter comeback of this career. Meanwhile Nacua, seeing his first action after being sidelined the previous two weeks, was held to just one reception in the first half but finished the day with nine catches for 125 yards. Tight end Tyler Higbee had another strong outing with five catches for 67 yards. The Rams' defense held the Eagles to just 172 yards in total net yards while also holding Philadelphia without a third down conversion (0 for 12). Outside linebacker Byron Young had six combined tackles including 2.5 sacks and a forced fumble, while inside linebacker Nate Landman led the Rams with nine total tackles.

==== Week 5: vs. Buffalo Bills ====
Week 5: Buffalo Bills at Los Angeles Rams – Game summary

Quarter	1	2	3	4	OT	Total
**Bills**	6	7	6	15	3	**37**
Rams	0	7	7	20	0	**34**

at SoFi Stadium, Inglewood, California

- Date: October 12
- Game time: 5:15 p.m. PDT
- Game weather: Cloudy, 69 °F (21 °C) (fixed roof)
- Game attendance: 73,882
- Referee: Scott Novak
- TV announcers (ESPN/ABC): Joe Buck, Troy Aikman, Lisa Salters, and Laura Rutledge
- Recap, Game Book

Game information

**First quarter**

- BUF – Tyler Bass 49-yard field goal, 13:23. Bills 3–0. **Drive: 4 plays, -5 yards, 1:37.**
- BUF – Tyler Bass 23-yard field goal, 0:10. Bills 6–0. **Drive: 10 plays, 55 yards, 5:25.**

**Second quarter**

- LAR – Davante Adams 4-yard pass from Matthew Stafford (Harrison Mevis kick), 8:00. Rams 7–6. **Drive: 14 plays, 71 yards, 7:10.**
- BUF – James Cook 17-yard run (Tyler Bass kick), 5:09. Bills 13–7. **Drive: 5 plays, 69 yards, 2:51.**

**Third quarter**

- LAR – Blake Corum 1-yard run (Harrison Mevis kick), 10:11. Rams 14–13. **Drive: 9 plays, 60 yards, 4:49.**
- BUF – Keon Coleman 7-yard pass from Josh Allen (kick failed), 2:45. Bills 19–14. **Drive: 9 plays, 60 yards, 4:49.**

**Fourth quarter**

- LAR – Puka Nacua 2-yard pass from Matthew Stafford (pass failed), 14:16. Rams 20–19. **Drive: 6 plays, 83 yards, 3:29.**
- BUF – Josh Allen 1-yard run (Josh Allen–Dalton Kincaid pass), 11:28. Bills 27–20. **Drive: 5 plays, 80 yards, 2:48.**
- LAR – Davante Adams 5-yard pass from Matthew Stafford (Harrison Mevis kick), 7:14. Tied 27–27. **Drive: 8 plays, 71 yards, 4:14.**
- BUF – James Cook 5-yard run (Tyler Bass kick), 1:39. Bills 34–27. **Drive: 11 plays, 71 yards, 5:35.**
- LAR – Kyren Williams 1-yard run (Harrison Mevis kick), 0:05. Tied 34–34. **Drive: 8 plays, 63 yards, 1:34.**

**Overtime**

- BUF – Tyler Bass 45-yard field goal, 1:55. Bills 37–34. **Drive: 5 plays, 35 yards, 2:16.**

**Top passers**

- BUF – Josh Allen – 12/19, 210 yards, TD, INT
- LAR – Matthew Stafford – 40/54, 383 yards, 3 TD

**Top rushers**

- BUF – Josh Allen – 10 rushes, 121 yards, TD
- LAR – Kyren Williams – 16 rushes, 49 yards, TD

**Top receivers**

- BUF – Khalil Shakir – 3 receptions, 80 yards
- LAR – Puka Nacua – 17 receptions, 138 yards, TD

A close defensive battle in the first half turned into an offensive shootout in the second half as the Rams and Bills combined for eight lead changes before Tyler Bass converted a 45-yard field goal to win it with 1:55 remaining in overtime, and Los Angeles became the first team to lose in overtime to Buffalo since 2017. After Bass hit on a pair of field goals in the first quarter, L.A. struck back with a 4-yard touchdown pass from quarterback Matthew Stafford to wide receiver Davante Adams. Stafford and Adams combined for a second touchdown in the fourth quarter while Stafford, who completed 40 of 54 passes for 383 yards, threw a third TD pass from two yards out to wide receiver Puka Nacua, who set a new career high for receptions with 17 for 138 yards. Running backs Blake Corum and Kyren Williams both had TD runs, with Williams' score coming with five seconds remaining in regulation to force the extra period. The Rams were poised to win the game after linebacker Nate Landman forced a fumble that was recovered by defensive tackle Aaron Donald at the L.A. 20. The Rams moved 50 yards in eight plays to set up a field goal attempt by kicker Harrison Mevis, but the 48-yard try was partially blocked and fell short and Buffalo won the game on the ensuing possession. Landman led the Rams with 13 tackles and cornerback Jaylen Watson added an interception in the loss.

==== Week 6: vs. Arizona Cardinals ====
Week 6: Arizona Cardinals at Los Angeles Rams – Game summary

Quarter	1	2	3	4	Total
**Cardinals**	3	6	3	6	**18**
Rams	3	6	0	7	**16**

at SoFi Stadium, Inglewood, California

- Date: October 18
- Game time: 1:05 p.m. PDT
- Game weather: Sunny, 86 °F (30 °C) (fixed roof)
- Game attendance: 72,573
- Referee: Clay Martin
- TV announcers (Fox): Kenny Albert, Greg Olsen, and Pam Oliver
- Recap, Game Book

Game information

**First quarter**

- LAR – Blake Grupe 44-yard field goal, 9:41. Rams 3–0. **Drive: 6 plays, 6 yards, 2:37.**
- ARI – Chad Ryland 34-yard field goal, 5:37. Tied 3–3. **Drive: 8 plays, 37 yards, 4:04.**

**Second quarter**

- ARI – Chad Ryland 30-yard field goal, 14:51. Cardinals 6–3. **Drive: 10 plays, 68 yards, 4:18.**
- LAR – Blake Corum 15-yard pass from Matthew Stafford (pass failed), 8:23. Rams 9–6. **Drive: 12 plays, 73 yards, 6:28.**
- ARI – Chad Ryland 22-yard field goal, 0:46. Tied 9–9. **Drive: 12 plays, 64 yards, 4:34.**

**Third quarter**

- ARI – Chad Ryland 38-yard field goal, 6:25. Cardinals 12–9. **Drive: 15 plays, 56 yards, 8:35.**

**Fourth quarter**

- ARI – Chad Ryland 27-yard field goal, 9:28. Cardinals 15–9. **Drive: 14 plays, 64 yards, 8:11.**
- LAR – Colby Parkinson 6-yard pass from Matthew Stafford (Ethan Evans kick), 0:47. Rams 16–15. **Drive: 8 plays, 86 yards, 2:01.**
- ARI – Chad Ryland 43-yard field goal, 0:00. Cardinals 18–16. **Drive: 5 plays, 40 yards, 0:47.**

**Top passers**

- ARI – Jacoby Brissett – 24/35, 218 yards, INT
- LAR – Matthew Stafford – 25/33, 222 yards, 2 TD

**Top rushers**

- ARI – Bam Knight – 15 rushes, 80 yards
- LAR – Kyren Williams – 10 rushes, 50 yards

**Top receivers**

- ARI – Trey McBride – 7 receptions, 53 yards
- LAR – Puka Nacua – 6 receptions, 80 yards

Six field goals by kicker Chad Ryland, the last coming with no time remaining, lifted the Cardinals to a shocking upset victory over the Rams, who fell to 2–4 on the season. Los Angeles took an early lead on a 44-yard field goal by newly-signed kicker Blake Grupe, but disaster struck on the ensuing kickoff when Grupe suffered a torn ACL while attempting to make a tackle and was knocked out of the game. The Rams took a 9–6 lead when running back Blake Corum scored his first career receiving touchdown on a 15-yard pass from quarterback Matthew Stafford, but without a kicker available, Stafford's pass was incomplete on the two-point attempt. Arizona scored four unanswered field goals and led 15–9 before the Rams mounted their final offensive drive, going 86 yards in eight plays that ended with Stafford throwing a 6-yard TD pass to tight end Colby Parkinson with 47 seconds left. But Arizona had enough time to drive down the field for Ryland's final kick, which dealt the Rams their first loss to the Cardinals since 2024. Wide receiver Davante Adams pulled a hamstring on L.A.'s final possession and was later placed on injured reserve.

==== Week 7: at Las Vegas Raiders ====
Week 7: Los Angeles Rams at Las Vegas Raiders – Game summary

Quarter	1	2	3	4	Total
**Rams**	7	21	0	7	**35**
Raiders	3	3	0	15	**21**

at Allegiant Stadium, Paradise, Nevada

- Date: October 25
- Game time: 1:25 p.m. PDT
- Game weather: None (indoor stadium)
- Game attendance: 62,550
- Referee: Ronald Torbert
- TV announcers (Fox): Chris Myers, Jonathan Vilma, and Megan Olivi
- Recap, Game Book

Game information

**First quarter**

- LAR – Davis Allen 3-yard pass from Matthew Stafford (Brandon McManus kick), 6:25. Rams 7–0. **Drive: 8 plays, 59 yards, 4:23.**
- LV – Matt Gay 30-yard field goal, 0:51. Rams 7–3. **Drive: 9 plays, 38 yards, 5:34.**

**Second quarter**

- LAR – Davis Allen 5-yard pass from Matthew Stafford (Brandon McManus kick), 10:01. Rams 14–3. **Drive: 12 plays, 80 yards, 5:50.**
- LAR – Puka Nacua 11-yard pass from Matthew Stafford (Brandon McManus kick), 4:15. Rams 21–3. **Drive: 7 plays, 81 yards, 4:14.**
- LAR – Kyren Williams 17-yard run (Brandon McManus kick), 1:19. Rams 28–3. **Drive: 6 plays, 52 yards, 0:37.**
- LV – Matt Gay 27-yard field goal, 0:00. Rams 28–6. **Drive: 8 plays, 55 yards, 1:19.**

**Third quarter**

- No scoring plays

**Fourth quarter**

- LV – Tre Tucker 37-yard pass from Kirk Cousins (pass failed), 14:51. Rams 28–12. **Drive: 6 plays, 91 yards, 2:35.**
- LV – Ashton Jeanty 15-yard pass from Kirk Cousins (pass failed), 13:12. Rams 28–18. **Drive: 4 plays, 34 yards, 1:27.**
- LAR – Blake Corum 4-yard run (Brandon McManus kick), 6:34. Rams 35–18. **Drive: 12 plays, 70 yards, 6:38.**
- LV – Matt Gay 36-yard field goal, 4:11. Rams 35–21. **Drive: 10 plays, 47 yards, 2:23.**

**Top passers**

- LAR – Matthew Stafford – 23/29, 195 yards, 3 TD, INT
- LV – Kirk Cousins – 26/44, 295 yards, 2 TD

**Top rushers**

- LAR – Kyren Williams – 16 rushes, 99 yards, TD
- LV – Mike Washington Jr. – 6 rushes, 27 yards

**Top receivers**

- LAR – Puka Nacua – 8 receptions, 68 yards, TD
- LV – Tre Tucker – 5 receptions, 103 yards, TD

Matthew Stafford threw three touchdowns in the first half to become the Rams' all-time leader in touchdown passes as L.A. avoided a third straight loss with a convincing victory in its first-ever visit to Las Vegas. The Rams quarterback completed 23 of 29 passes for 195 yards, connecting with tight end Davis Allen for scores in the first and second quarters as Allen had the first multi-TD game of his career. Later in the second period, Stafford hit wide receiver Puka Nacua for an 11-yard score to give him 155 touchdown passes since joining the Rams in 2021, breaking the team's career record of 154 held previously by Roman Gabriel, who played quarterback for the Rams from 1962 to 1972. Also the all-time touchdown pass leader for the Detroit Lions, Stafford became the first player in league history to hold that distinction simultaneously with two NFL franchises. Playing for the first time in his birthplace, Nacua led the Rams with eight receptions for 68 yards. Running back Kyren Williams ran for 99 yards on 16 carries, including a 17-yard scoring run in the second quarter that gave the Rams a commanding 28–3 lead, and Blake Corum added 93 yards and a touchdown on 17 carries. Cornerback Josh Wallace and outside linebacker Byron Young shared the team lead with six tackles each, with Wallace adding a pass deflection and Young recording a sack.

==== Week 8: vs. Los Angeles Chargers ====
Week 8: Los Angeles Chargers at Los Angeles Rams – Game summary

Quarter	1	2	3	4	Total
Chargers	3	6	0	0	**9**
**Rams**	3	7	14	0	**24**

at SoFi Stadium, Inglewood, California

- Date: November 1
- Game time: 1:05 p.m. PST
- Game weather: Sunny, 70 °F (21 °C) (fixed roof)
- Game attendance: 73,621
- Referee: Brad Rogers
- TV announcers (Fox): Adam Amin, Drew Brees, and Kristina Pink
- Recap, Game Book

Game information

**First quarter**

- LAR – Brandon McManus 30-yard field goal, 5:42. Rams 3–0. **Drive: 4 plays, 8 yards, 1:29.**
- LAC – Cameron Dicker 34-yard field goal, 0:00. Tied 3–3. **Drive: 9 plays, 56 yards, 5:38.**

**Second quarter**

- LAC – Cameron Dicker 46-yard field goal, 10:06. Chargers 6–3. **Drive: 8 plays, 47 yards, 3:13.**
- LAC – Cameron Dicker 41-yard field goal, 1:55. Chargers 9–3. **Drive: 11 plays, 57 yards, 6:31.**
- LAR – Kyren Williams 1-yard run (Brandon McManus kick), 0:19. Rams 10–9. **Drive: 5 plays, 66 yards, 1:36.**

**Third quarter**

- LAR – Blake Corum 23-yard run (Brandon McManus kick), 10:42. Rams 17–9. **Drive: 8 plays, 74 yards, 4:18.**
- LAR – Puka Nacua 18-yard pass from Matthew Stafford (Brandon McManus kick), 3:41. Rams 24–9. **Drive: 2 plays, 22 yards, 0:44.**

**Fourth quarter**

- No scoring plays

**Top passers**

- LAC – Justin Herbert – 24/32, 257 yards, 2 INT
- LAR – Matthew Stafford – 17/25, 157 yards, TD, INT

**Top rushers**

- LAC – Kimani Vidal – 8 rushes, 23 yards
- LAR – Blake Corum – 11 rushes, 73 yards, TD

**Top receivers**

- LAC – Ladd McConkey – 4 receptions, 86 yards
- LAR – Puka Nacua – 11 receptions, 80 yards, TD

Kyren Williams's 1-yard touchdown run with 19 seconds remaining in the first half gave the Rams a lead that they never relinquished as they beat the Chargers to even their season record at 4–4. Returning to the starting lineup after a two-week absence, cornerback Trent McDuffie led the team with nine total tackles and adding a pass deflection along with an interception in the third quarter that set up a Matthew Stafford-to-Puka Nacua touchdown. The Rams' running game was effective as Blake Corum had a team-high 73 yards and a touchdown on 11 carries. Williams added 16 carries for 56 yards with most of his production coming on the Rams' final possession as he ran the ball 11 times on a 12-play drive that consumed the game's final 6 minutes and 39 seconds. Meanwhile, the Rams defense held the Chargers out of the end zone and to just 64 rushing yards on 25 carries while also consistently harassing quarterback Justin Herbert.

==== Week 9: at Washington Commanders ====
Week 9: Los Angeles Rams at Washington Commanders – Game summary

Quarter	1	2	3	4	Total
**Rams**	3	3	7	7	**20**
Commanders	3	7	3	0	**13**

at Northwest Stadium, Landover, Maryland

- Date: November 8
- Game time: 1:00 p.m. EST/10:00 a.m. PST
- Game weather: Sunny, 59 °F (15 °C)
- Game attendance: 64,016
- Referee: John Hussey
- TV announcers (Fox): Chris Myers, Mark Schlereth, and Jen Hale
- Recap, Game Book

Game information

**First quarter**

- WSH – Drew Stevens 37-yard field goal, 9:07. Commanders 3–0. **Drive: 11 plays, 48 yards, 5:53.**
- LAR – Brandon McManus 33-yard field goal, 2:10. Tied 3–3. **Drive: 14 plays, 51 yards, 6:57.**

**Second quarter**

- WSH – Van Jefferson 7-yard pass from Jayden Daniels (Drew Stevens kick), 14:00. Commanders 10–3. **Drive: 6 plays, 80 yards, 3:10.**
- LAR – Brandon McManus 20-yard field goal, 0:00. Commanders 10–6. **Drive: 10 plays, 43 yards, 2:07.**

**Third quarter**

- LAR – Blake Corum 1-yard run (Brandon McManus kick), 11:29. Rams 13–10. **Drive: 8 plays, 69 yards, 3:31.**
- WSH – Drew Stevens 41-yard field goal, 3:24. Tied 13–13. **Drive: 4 plays, 4 yards, 2:33.**

**Fourth quarter**

- LAR – Puka Nacua 7-yard pass from Matthew Stafford (Brandon McManus kick), 12:51. Rams 20–13. **Drive: 12 plays, 65 yards, 5:33.**

**Top passers**

- LAR – Matthew Stafford – 26/43, 228 yards, TD, INT
- WSH – Jayden Daniels – 24/35, 274 yards, TD

**Top rushers**

- LAR – Blake Corum – 11 rushes, 58 yards, TD
- WSH – Rachaad White – 7 rushes, 28 yards

**Top receivers**

- LAR – Puka Nacua – 14 receptions, 150 yards, TD
- WSH – Van Jefferson – 5 receptions, 58 yards, TD

==== Week 10: at Arizona Cardinals ====
Week 10: Los Angeles Rams at Arizona Cardinals – Game summary

Quarter	1	2	3	4	Total
**Rams**	3	14	14	3	**34**
Cardinals	6	0	0	0	**6**

at State Farm Stadium, Glendale, Arizona

- Date: November 15
- Game time: 2:05 p.m. MST/1:05 p.m. PST
- Game weather: Sunny, 75 °F (24 °C) (retractable roof open)
- Game attendance: 60,926
- Referee: Land Clark
- TV announcers (CBS): Andrew Catalon, Logan Ryan, and AJ Ross
- Recap, Game Book

Game information

**First quarter**

- ARI – Chad Ryland 49-yard field goal, 10:48. Cardinals 3–0. **Drive: 8 plays, 36 yards, 4:12.**
- LAR – Brandon McManus 24-yard field goal, 5:22. Tied 3–3. **Drive: 11 plays, 50 yards, 5:26.**
- ARI – Chad Ryland 49-yard field goal, 2:11. Cardinals 6–3. **Drive: 6 plays, 35 yards, 3:11.**

**Second quarter**

- LAR – Tyler Higbee 5-yard pass from Matthew Stafford (Brandon McManus kick), 1:06. Rams 10–6. **Drive: 10 plays, 72 yards, 4:18.**
- LAR – Xavier Smith 22-yard pass from Matthew Stafford (Brandon McManus kick), 0:13. Rams 17–6. **Drive: 3 plays, 32 yards, 0:18.**

**Third quarter**

- LAR – Blake Corum 1-yard run (Brandon McManus kick), 10:17. Rams 24–6. **Drive: 8 plays, 78 yards, 4:43.**
- LAR – Davis Allen 19-yard pass from Matthew Stafford (Brandon McManus kick), 5:55. Rams 31–6. **Drive: 5 plays, 48 yards, 2:53.**

**Fourth quarter**

- LAR – Brandon McManus 43-yard field goal, 14:55. Rams 34–6. **Drive: 7 plays, 20 yards, 4:09.**

**Top passers**

- LAR – Matthew Stafford – 18/26, 249 yards, 3 TD, INT
- ARI – Carson Beck – 11/28, 108 yards, 2 INT

**Top rushers**

- LAR – Blake Corum – 17 rushes, 100 yards, TD
- ARI – Bam Knight – 5 rushes, 19 yards

**Top receivers**

- LAR – Konata Mumpfield – 3 receptions, 81 yards
- ARI – Trey McBride – 5 receptions, 37 yards

==== Week 12: vs. Green Bay Packers ====
Thanksgiving Eve Game

Week 12: Green Bay Packers at Los Angeles Rams – Game summary

Quarter	1	2	3	4	Total
Packers	0	0	0	0	**0**
Rams	0	0	0	0	**0**

at SoFi Stadium, Inglewood, California

- Date: November 25
- Game time: 5:00 p.m. PST
- Game weather: TBD (fixed roof)
- TV announcers (Netflix): Noah Eagle, Luke Kuechly, MJ Acosta-Ruiz, and Tom Pelissero
  Game exclusive to KNBC, WDJT, and WFRV.
- Preview

=== Standings ===
==== Division ====
NFC West
	W	L	T	PCT	DIV	CONF	PF	PA	STK
San Francisco 49ers	8	1	0	.889	3–0	5–1	281	196	W2
Seattle Seahawks	6	4	0	.600	2–1	2–3	223	175	W2
Los Angeles Rams	6	4	0	.600	1–2	4–2	248	187	W4
Arizona Cardinals	3	7	0	.300	1–4	2–6	184	289	L2

==== Conference ====
NFC
Seed	Team	Division	W	L	T	PCT	DIV	CONF	SOS	SOV	STK
**Division leaders**
1	San Francisco 49ers	West	8	1	0	.889	3–0	5–1	.431	.448	W2
2 (Note: Detroit wins tie break over Minnesota and Chicago based on head-to-head record.)	Detroit Lions	North	7	2	0	.778	2–0	4–1	.459	.403	W5
3	New York Giants	East	5	3	1	.611	2–1–1	3–3–1	.353	.292	L1
4	Carolina Panthers	South	4	5	0	.444	2–1	4–3	.524	.405	W1
**Wild cards**
5 (Note: Minnesota wins tie break over Chicago based on head-to-head victory.)	Minnesota Vikings	North	7	2	0	.778	3–1	5–1	.518	.433	W1
6	Chicago Bears	North	7	2	0	.778	0–2	5–2	.442	.373	W4
7 (Note: Green Bay wins tie break over Seattle based on conference record. Division tie break was initially used to eliminate LA Rams (see below).)	Green Bay Packers	North	6	4	0	.600	1–3	4–4	.521	.439	L1
**In the hunt**
8 (Note: Seattle wins tie break over LA Rams based on division record.)	Seattle Seahawks	West	6	4	0	.600	2–1	2–3	.516	.397	W2
9	Los Angeles Rams	West	6	4	0	.600	1–2	4–2	.484	.339	W4
10	Dallas Cowboys	East	4	6	0	.400	2–1	2–5	.438	.321	L1
11	Washington Commanders	East	3	5	1	.389	2–2–1	3–4–1	.488	.482	W1
12 (Note: Tampa Bay wins tie break over New Orleans based on division record.)	Tampa Bay Buccaneers	South	3	6	0	.333	2–0	3–3	.588	.379	L1
13	New Orleans Saints	South	3	6	0	.333	0–2	1–4	.547	.534	L1
14 (Note: Atlanta wins tie break over Arizona based on conference record.)	Atlanta Falcons	South	3	7	0	.300	1–2	3–3	.598	.607	L3
15	Arizona Cardinals	West	3	7	0	.300	1–4	2–6	.595	.379	L2
16	Philadelphia Eagles	East	2	7	0	.222	1–3	1–6	.500	.250	L7
