= Blake Corum =

American football player (born 2000)

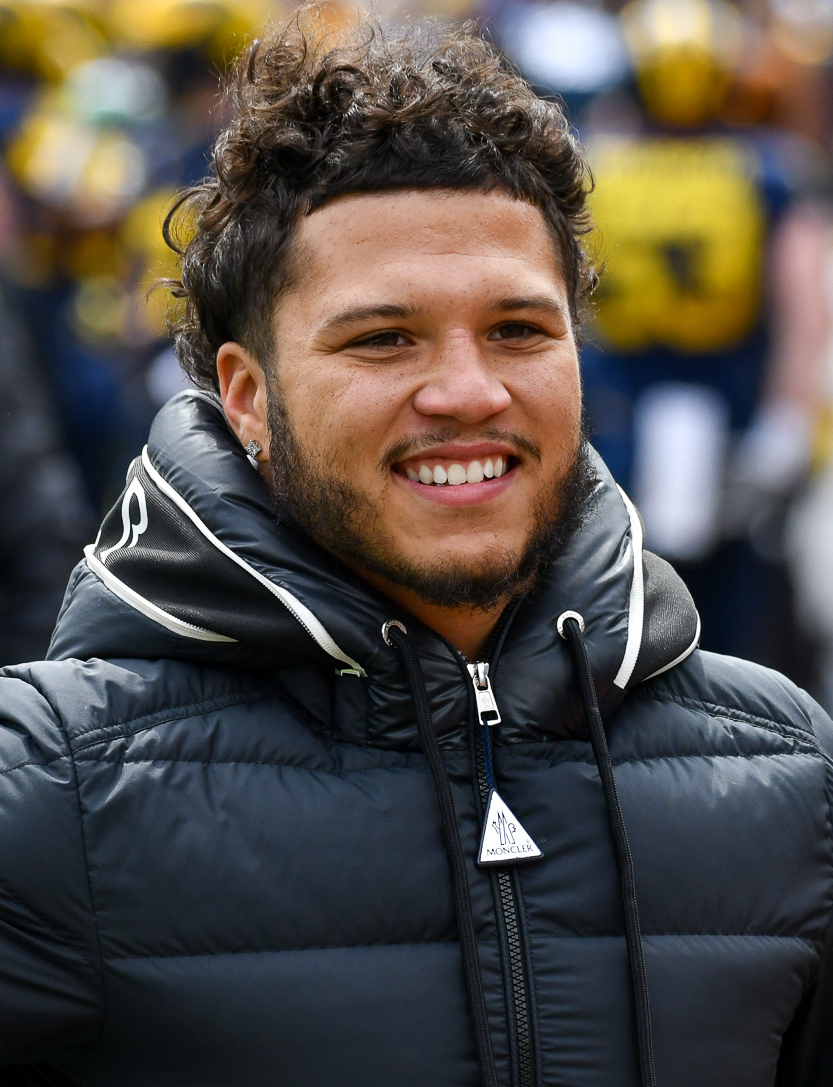
- Corum in 2024

No. 24 – Los Angeles Rams
- Positions: Running back, kickoff returner
- Roster status: Active

Personal information
- Born: November 25, 2000 (age 25); Marshall, Virginia, U.S.
- Listed height: 5 ft 8 in (1.73 m)
- Listed weight: 202 lb (92 kg)

Career information
- High school: Saint Frances Academy (Baltimore, Maryland)
- College: Michigan (2020–2023)
- NFL draft: 2024: 3rd round, 83rd overall pick

Career history
- Los Angeles Rams (2024–present)

Awards and highlights
- CFP national champion (2023); CFP National Championship Game Offensive MVP (2024); Unanimous All-American (2022); First-team All-American (2023); NCAA rushing touchdowns leader (2023); NCAA scoring leader (2023); Big Ten Most Valuable Player (2022); 2× Big Ten Running Back of the Year (2022, 2023); 2× First-team All-Big Ten (2022, 2023); Third-team All-Big Ten (2021)

Career NFL statistics as of Week 9, 2026
- Rushing yards: 1,400
- Rushing average: 4.8
- Rushing touchdowns: 10
- Receptions: 25
- Receiving yards: 193
- Receiving touchdowns: 1
- Return yards: 512
- Stats at Pro Football Reference

Blake Nolan Corum (born November 25, 2000) is an American professional football running back and kickoff returner for the Los Angeles Rams of the National Football League (NFL). He was a two-time All-American playing college football for the Michigan Wolverines, including unanimous All-American honors and the Big Ten Most Valuable Player in 2022. In 2023, Corum became the all-time leader for the University of Michigan in rushing touchdowns with 58, set the single-season record with 27 rushing touchdowns, won three consecutive Big Ten Conference titles, was a national champion and earned its offensive MVP award. He was selected by the Rams in the third round of the 2024 NFL draft.

== Early life ==
Corum was born on November 25, 2000, in Marshall, Virginia, attending high school at Saint Frances Academy in Baltimore, Maryland.

He was selected as the 2019 Gatorade Player of the Year in Maryland and The Baltimore Sun's Offensive Player of the Year, rushing for 1,438 yards and 22 touchdowns during his senior season for Saint Frances as he led the Panthers to a No. 4 national ranking. He was a four-star recruit and rated as the No. 12 high school running back. He received his first division one offer in the eight grade.

== College career ==
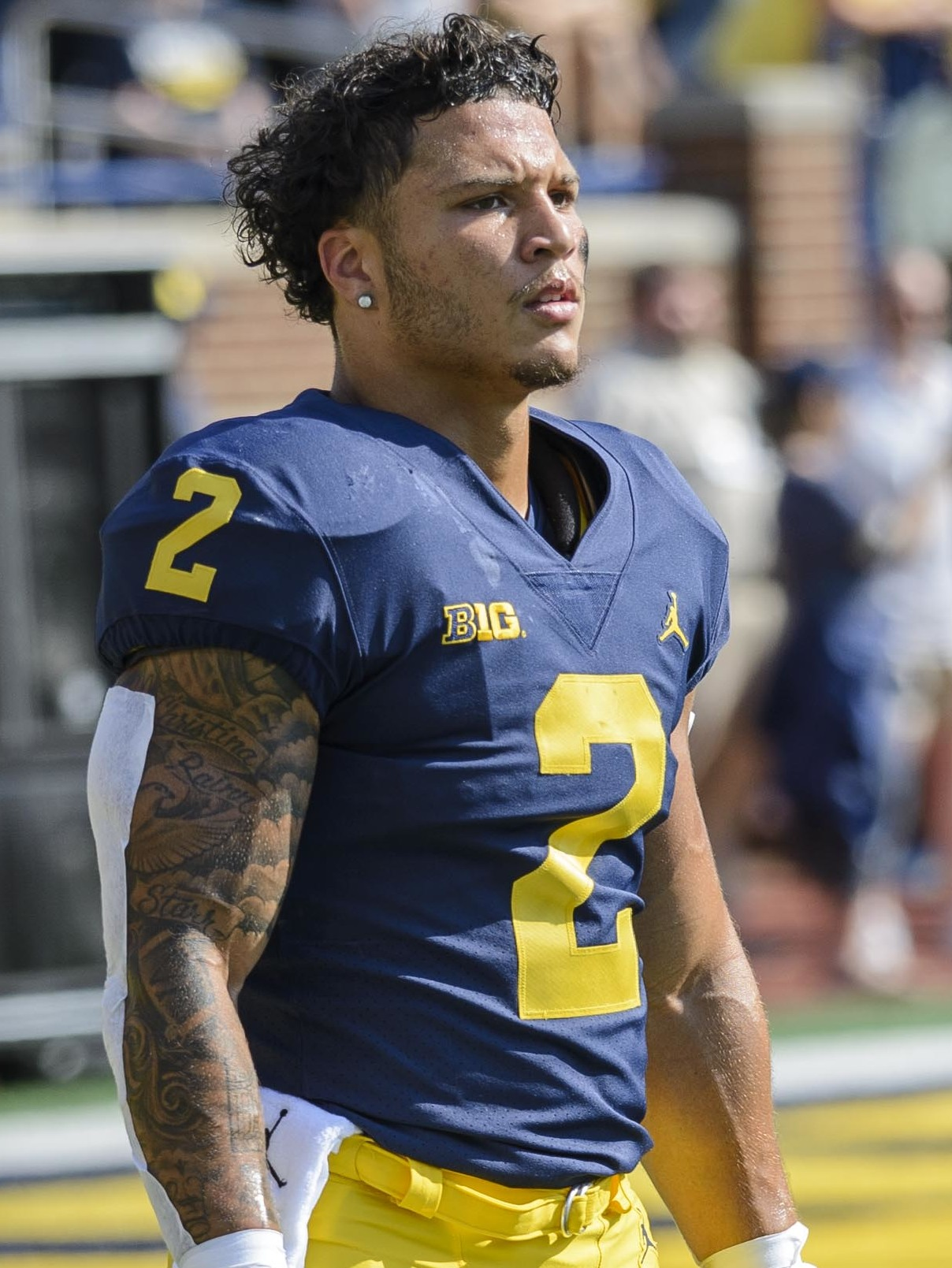
Corum with Michigan in 2021

=== 2020 season ===
Corum enrolled at the University of Michigan in January 2020. In his first semester at Michigan, he drew praise for both running the 40-yard dash in 4.4 seconds and earning a 4.0 grade point average. On October 24, in the season opener versus Minnesota and his college debut, he earned his first career start. On October 31, Corum scored his first two collegiate touchdowns against rival Michigan State. As a true freshman he appeared in all six games, rushing for 77 yards (3.0 yards per carry), while also adding five receptions for 73 yards.

=== 2021 season ===
Prior to the 2021 season, Sports Illustrated wrote that Corum was poised for a breakout year. Through the first two games of the 2021 season, Corum rushed for 282 yards on 35 carries. He averaged 141 rushing yards per game and also caught five passes for 33 yards.

Against Washington, he tallied a career high 171 rushing yards and three touchdowns, including a 67-yard touchdown run. He also had 128 yards on kickoff returns and led the nation in all-purpose yards with an average of 221.5 yards per game.

On September 18, Corum recorded his third straight 100-yard rushing game, becoming the first Michigan player to accomplish this feat since Denard Robinson in 2011, and the first player to record 100-plus yards rushing in three consecutive games to start the season since Mike Hart in 2007.

=== 2022 season ===
On September 17, Corum tied Michigan's modern-era record with five rushing touchdowns in a game against UConn. He became the first Michigan player to score four first-half touchdowns since Ed Shuttlesworth in 1972.

On September 24, Corum rushed for a career-high 243 yards and two touchdowns on 30 carries in a 34–27 win over Maryland. His 243 rushing yards was the most for a Michigan player since Denard Robinson rushed for 258 yards in 2010.

He continued with 133 yards against Iowa on October 1, 124 yards against Indiana on October 8, 166 yards against Penn State on October 15, and 177 yards against Michigan State on October 29. Corum was named Big Ten Offensive Player of the Week for his performances against Maryland and Michigan State.

On November 19, Corum suffered a torn meniscus and sprained MCL in the first half of Michigan's game against Illinois and played sparingly the rest of that game. Corum tried to play through the injury in the rivalry game against Ohio State the next week. He recorded two carries for six yards on Michigan's first drive of the game but didn't play again until he took the field for a celebratory Michigan victory kneel-down on the final play of the game.

At the time of his injury, Corum was a top contender for the Heisman Trophy and had the third-best odds to win it. On December 1, 2022, it was announced that Corum would undergo knee surgery, ending his season before Michigan's appearances in the Big Ten Championship and the College Football Playoff semifinal Fiesta Bowl.

Over the 2022 season, Corum had 1,463 rushing yards, 18 rushing touchdowns, and one receiving touchdown. Corum finished seventh in voting for the Heisman Trophy, was named a unanimous All-American and won the Big Ten Most Valuable Player, the second straight Michigan player to win MVP.

=== 2023 season ===
On January 9, 2023, Corum announced that he would be returning to Michigan for his senior year. In an appearance on the Rich Eisen Show, Corum said, "I have unfinished business. I didn't like the way I went out in the Big House. I don't like people remembering me being hurt. And so I will be coming back for it all next year." During halftime of a Michigan basketball game in February, Corum spoke the crowd and guaranteed that Michigan would win the national championship in the upcoming football season.

On October 14, 2023, Corum had 13 carries for 52 yards, and became the tenth player in Michigan history to reach 3,000 career rushing yards. With two rushing touchdowns in the game, he passed Mike Hart and Denard Robinson for the third-most career rushing touchdowns in program history (43).

On November 4, 2023, Corum recorded three rushing touchdowns in the game, tying for second on the career rushing touchdowns list with Tyrone Wheatley at 47.

On November 18, 2023, Corum rushed for 94 yards and two touchdowns, moving to eighth on Michigan's all-time rushing list with 3,380 yards. With his two rushing touchdowns in the game, Corum tied Hassan Haskins' single-season rushing touchdown record of 20 set in 2021.

On November 25, 2023, in the victory versus Ohio State, Corum rushed for 88 yards and two touchdowns, setting a new single-season rushing touchdown record of 22. He was the only player in the FBS to score in each game in the 2023 season.

On December 2, 2023, in the Big Ten Championship, Corum rushed for 52 yards, and two touchdowns, for his 55th career touchdown. With 52 rushing yards in the game, he passed 1,000-yards on the season, and became the first player with consecutive 1,000-yard rushing seasons since Denard Robinson. With two rushing touchdowns in the game, he tied Anthony Thomas for Michigan's career record for rushing touchdowns.

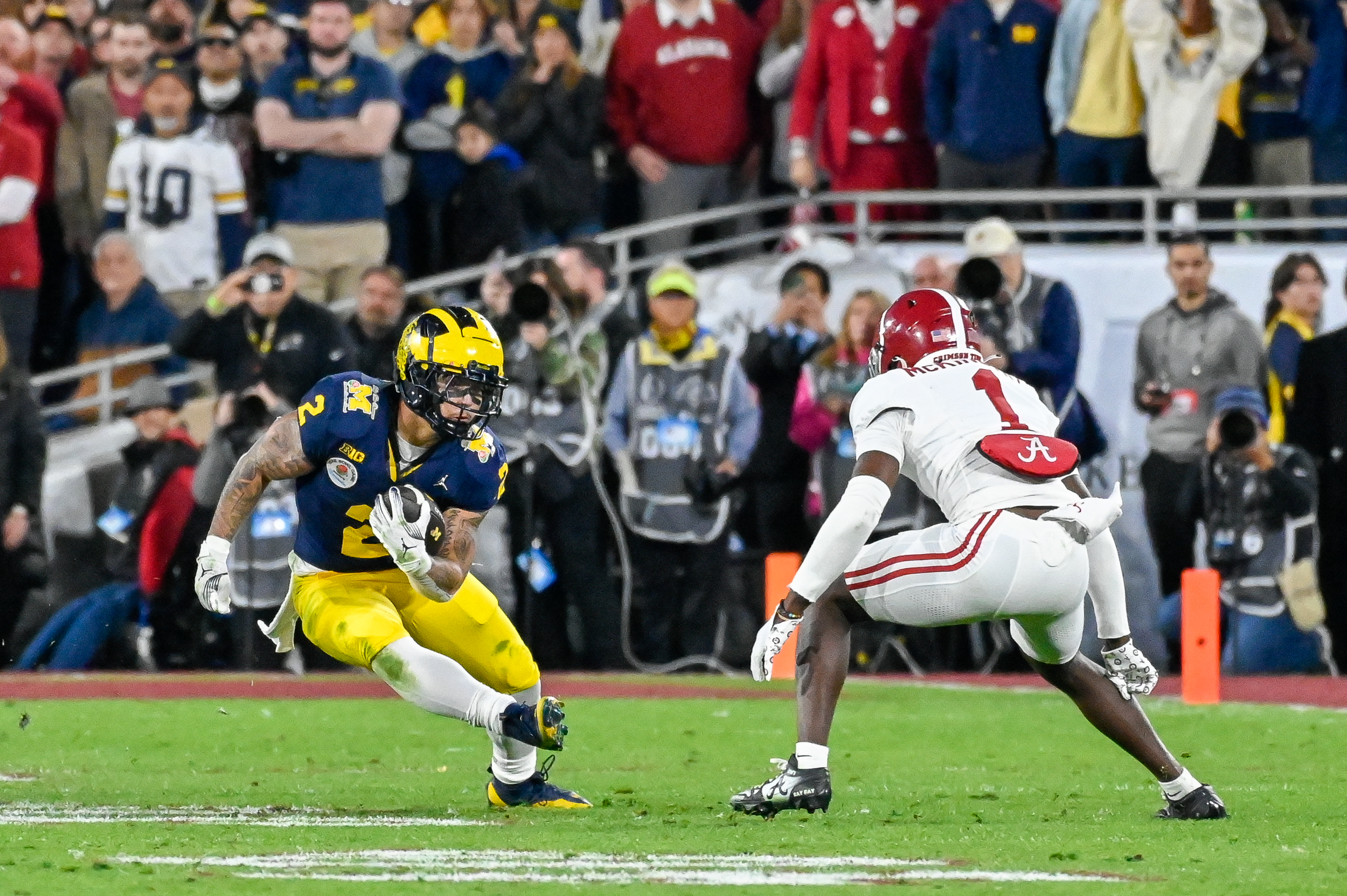
Corum in the 2024 Rose Bowl versus Alabama’s Kool-Aid McKinstry.

On January 1, 2024, during the 2024 Rose Bowl against Alabama, Corum rushed for 83 yards and scored two total touchdowns. He caught a receiving touchdown in the first quarter. On the second play of overtime, Corum made a jump cut and broke multiple tackles to score the game-winning touchdown to send Michigan to the national championship. In scoring his 56th career rushing touchdown, Corum broke Anthony Thomas's previously held record to become the all-time career rushing touchdown leader at Michigan.

On January 8, Michigan played Washington in the 2024 College Football Playoff National Championship with Corum starting at running back. On the last play of the first quarter, he broke away for a 59-yard gain, the longest play of the game. He finished the game with 21 carries for 134 yards and two touchdowns. He was named National Championship Offensive MVP, finishing his senior season with 27 rushing touchdowns.

Corum (134 yards) and Donovan Edwards (104 yards) also became the first pair of teammates in College Football Playoff National Championship history to each rush for over 100 yards.

Corum led the NCAA with 27 rushing touchdowns, 28 total touchdowns, and 168 points scored, setting Michigan and Big Ten single-season records for all three. He finished his college career as Michigan's all-time leader in rushing touchdowns (58), total touchdowns (61) and points scored (366). Corum was the only FBS player in the country to score a touchdown in every one of his team's games during the 2023 season.

== Professional career ==
Pre-draft measurables
Height	Weight	Arm length	Hand span	Wingspan	40-yard dash	10-yard split	20-yard split	20-yard shuttle	Three-cone drill	Vertical jump	Bench press
5 ft 7 3/4 in (1.72 m)	205 lb (93 kg)	28 7/8 in (0.73 m)	9 in (0.23 m)	5 ft 10 1/8 in (1.78 m)	4.53 s	1.58 s	2.65 s	4.07 s	6.82 s	35.5 in (0.90 m)	27 reps
All values from NFL Combine/Pro Day

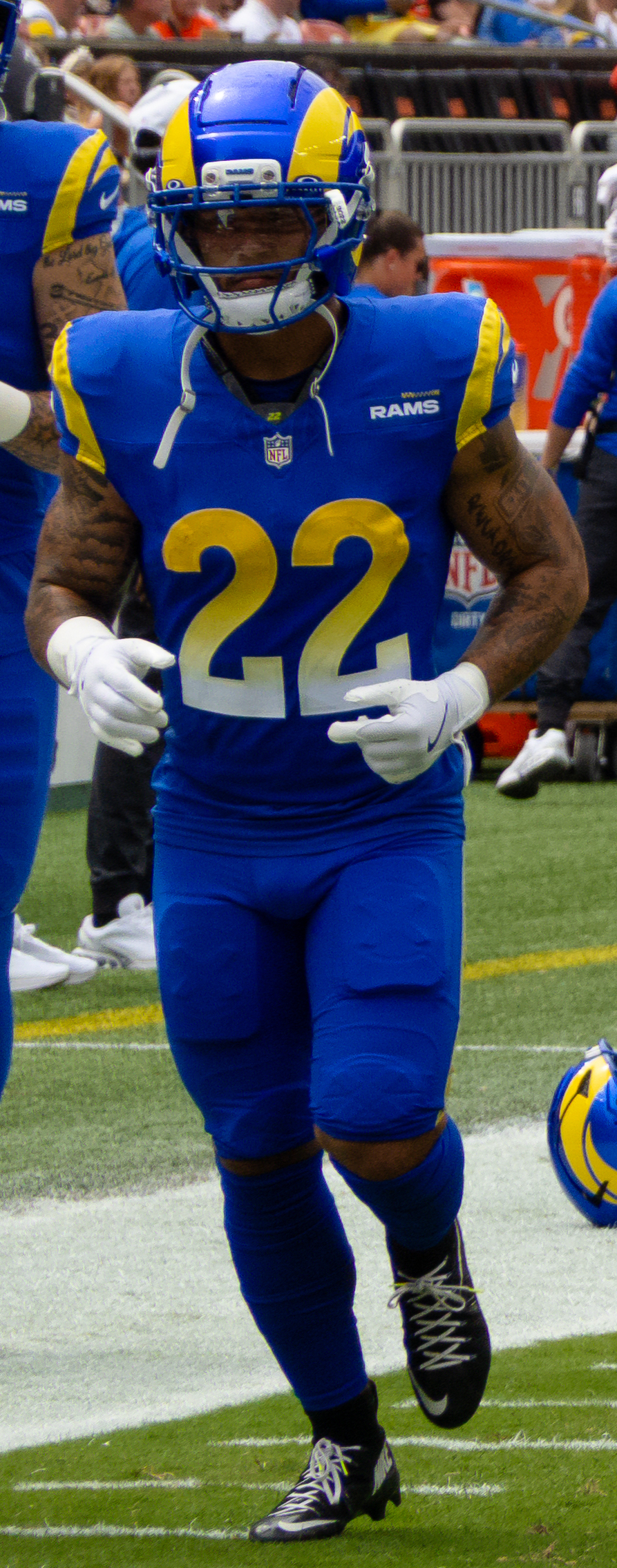
Corum with the Rams in 2025

Corum was selected 83rd overall by the Los Angeles Rams in the third round of the 2024 NFL draft. In his rookie season, he played in a backup role to starting running back Kyren Williams for most of the year. Corum earned his first NFL start in Week 18 against the Seattle Seahawks, but suffered a season-ending fractured forearm in the game. He finished the 2024 season with 58 carries for 207 rushing yards to go with seven receptions for 58 receiving yards.

In 2025, Corum played in all 17 regular season games, growing as a complement to starter Williams. During a 33–19 victory over the Tennessee Titans in Week 2, Corum scored his first career NFL touchdown on a 1-yard run in the fourth quarter. Against Carolina in Week 13, Corum had seven carries for 81 yards and a touchdown in the Rams' 31–28 loss. A week later at Arizona, Corum had a breakout performance, rushing 12 times for 128 yards and two touchdowns, including a 48-yard TD for the longest run of his career to date. Corum added 71 yards and a touchdown on 11 carries in the Rams' 41–34 win over the Detroit Lions in Week 15. For the regular season, Corum finished with 746 yards on six touchdowns on 145 carries (a 5.1 yards per carry average). Playing in his first-ever NFL playoff game, Corum had 11 carries for 45 yards and two receptions for 13 yards in the Rams' 34–31 wild card round victory over the Carolina Panthers. Against the Chicago Bears, Corum rushed for 19 yards on six carries as L.A. won 20–17 in overtime. In the NFC Championship Game against the Seattle Seahawks, Corum ran nine times for 55 yards and caught three passes for 24 yards in the Rams' 31–27 loss.

During the 2026 offseason, Corum changed his jersey number from 22 to 24 to allow the newly acquired Trent McDuffie to wear the former. Corum had previously worn No. 24 while in high school playing for Saint Frances Academy. Beginning the season sharing the rushing workload with Williams, Corum had 10 carries for 54 yards in Week 1 versus San Francisco and 12 carries for 79 yards against the New York Giants in Week 2. Against the Buffalo Bills in Week 5, Corum scored his first TD of the season on a 1-yard run in the third quarter of the Rams' overtime loss. A week later, Corum scored the first receiving touchdown of his career on a 15-yard swing pass from quarterback Matthew Stafford in L.A.'s 18-16 loss to Arizona. Against the Las Vegas Raiders in Week 7, Corum had 17 carries for 93 yards and a touchdown (while having two TDs called back due to penalties) as the Rams won 35-21. Corum turned in another strong effort in Week 8 against the Los Angeles Chargers, totaling 73 rushing yards on 11 carries and scoring on a 23-yard run in the Rams' 24-9 victory.

== Career statistics ==
=== NFL ===
Legend
**Bold**	Career high

==== Regular season ====
Year	Team	Games		Rushing						Receiving					Kick returns					Fumbles	
Year	Team	GP	GS	Att	Yds	Avg	Y/G	Lng	TD	Rec	Yds	Avg	Lng	TD	Ret	Yds	Avg	Lng	TD	Fum	Lost
2024	LAR	17	1	58	207	3.6	12.2	12	0	7	**58**	8.3	12	0	7	186	26.6	41	0	0	0
2025	LAR	17	0	**145**	**746**	5.1	**43.9**	**48**	**6**	**8**	36	4.5	14	0	13	326	25.1	30	0	0	0
2026	LAR	9	0	86	447	**5.2**	49.7	23	4	10	99	**9.9**	**34**	**1**	0	0	0.0	0	0	**1**	0
Career		43	1	289	1,400	4.8	32.6	48	10	25	193	7.7	34	1	20	512	25.6	41	0	1	0

==== Postseason ====
Year	Team	Games		Rushing						Receiving					Kick returns					Fumbles	
Year	Team	GP	GS	Att	Yds	Avg	Y/G	Lng	TD	Rec	Yds	Avg	Lng	TD	Ret	Yds	Avg	Lng	TD	Fum	Lost
2024	LAR	0	0	Did not play due to injury																	
2025	LAR	3	0	**26**	**119**	**4.6**	**39.7**	**19**	0	**5**	**37**	**7.4**	**15**	0	0	0	0.0	0	0	0	0
Career		3	0	26	119	4.6	39.7	19	0	5	37	7.4	15	0	0	0	0.0	0	0	0	0

=== College ===
Legend
	Led the NCAA
**Bold**	Career high

Year	Team	Games		Rushing				Receiving				Kick returns			
Year	Team	GP	GS	Att	Yards	Avg	TD	Rec	Yards	Avg	TD	Ret	Yards	Avg	TD
2020	Michigan	6	1	26	77	3.0	2	5	73	**14.6**	0	5	96	19.2	0
2021	Michigan	12	0	144	952	**6.6**	11	**24**	**141**	5.9	**1**	**12**	**304**	**25.3**	0
2022	Michigan	12	12	247	**1,463**	5.9	18	11	80	7.3	**1**	0	0	0.0	0
2023	Michigan	**15**	**15**	**258**	1,245	4.8	**27**	16	117	7.3	**1**	0	0	0.0	0
Career		45	28	675	3,737	5.5	58	56	411	7.3	3	17	400	23.5	0

== Personal life ==
On April 7, 2024, weeks before the 2024 NFL draft, Corum threw out the ceremonial first pitch at a Detroit Tigers baseball game at Comerica Park.
