= Coram Deo =

Coram Deo is a Latin phrase translated "in the presence of God" from Christian theology which summarizes the idea of Christians living in the presence of, under the authority of, and to the honor and glory of God. The phrase may refer to:

- Coram Deo Academy, an American private Christian school in Dallas, Texas
- Coram Deo Classical Academy, an American private Christian School in Bartlesville, Oklahoma
- Coram Deo, praise and worship album of the year at the 24th GMA Dove Awards
- Coram Deo II, praise and worship album of the year at the 26th GMA Dove Awards
