= Trent McDuffie =

American football player (born 2000)

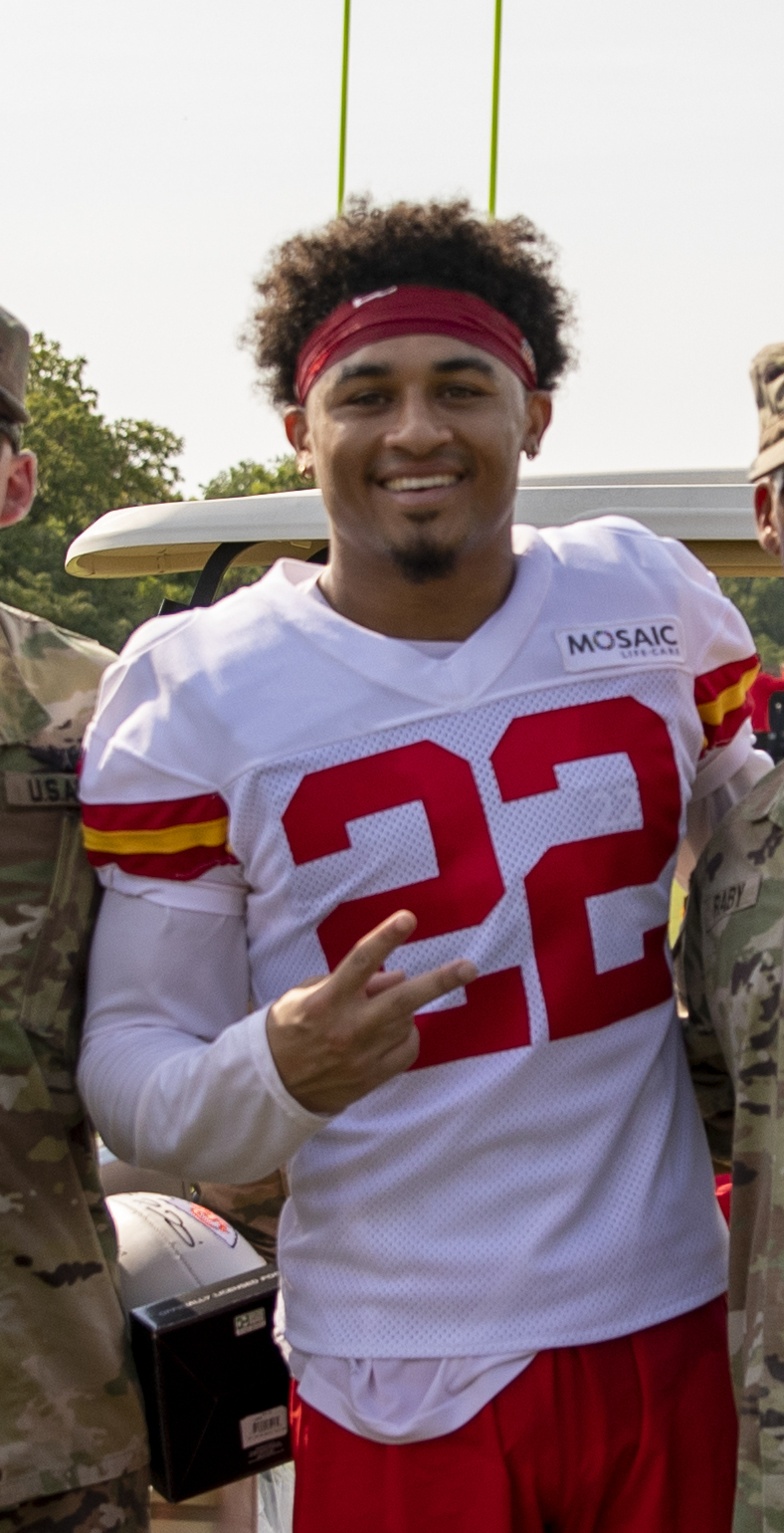
- McDuffie in 2023

No. 22 – Los Angeles Rams
- Position: Cornerback
- Roster status: Active

Personal information
- Born: September 13, 2000 (age 26); Westminster, California, U.S.
- Listed height: 5 ft 11 in (1.80 m)
- Listed weight: 193 lb (88 kg)

Career information
- High school: St. John Bosco (Bellflower, California)
- College: Washington (2019–2021)
- NFL draft: 2022: 1st round, 21st overall pick

Career history
- Kansas City Chiefs (2022–2025); Los Angeles Rams (2026–present)

Awards and highlights
- 2× Super Bowl champion (LVII, LVIII); First-team All-Pro (2023); Second-team All-Pro (2024); Third-team All-American (2021); First-team All-Pac-12 (2021); Second-team All-Pac-12 (2020)

Career NFL statistics as of Week 10, 2026
- Total tackles: 273
- Sacks: 5.5
- Forced fumbles: 8
- Pass deflections: 42
- Interceptions: 5
- Stats at Pro Football Reference

Trent McDuffie (born September 13, 2000) is an American professional football cornerback for the Los Angeles Rams of the National Football League (NFL). He played college football for the Washington Huskies and was selected by the Kansas City Chiefs in the first round of the 2022 NFL draft. McDuffie then became a starting corner for the Chiefs as the team won the Super Bowl of the 2022 season in his rookie season. In his second season, the Chiefs once again won the 2023 season Super Bowl with McDuffie as a starter. He was also named first-team All-Pro for his performances and had several prolific plays in the Super Bowl win.

== Early life ==
McDuffie attended St. John Bosco High School in Bellflower, California, after transferring from Servite High School, where he had played his sophomore and junior seasons. After earning All-Trinity League and All-CIF-Southern Section Division 1 honors his senior year, he was selected to the All-American Bowl. He committed to play college football at the University of Washington.

== College career ==
McDuffie played in all 13 games with 11 starts as a true freshman at Washington in 2019. He had 45 tackles and one interception. As a sophomore in 2020, he started all four of Washington's games and had 14 tackles and an interception.

He wrapped up his Washington career with 94 tackles, four tackles-for-loss, one sack, two interceptions, 10 pass breakups, three forced fumbles and three fumble recoveries earning First Team All-Pac 12 honors as well as being named to All-American teams by several publications.

Following his junior season in 2021, McDuffie announced he was forgoing his senior season in order to declare himself eligible for the 2022 NFL Draft.

== Professional career ==
=== Pre-draft ===
Dane Brugler of The Athletic ranked him as the top cornerback prospect in the draft. Pro Football Focus and NFL.com media analyst Daniel Jeremiah both ranked McDuffie as the second best cornerback prospect in the draft. ESPN draft analyst Mel Kiper Jr. had him ranked third amongst all cornerbacks available in the draft. Michael Renner of Pro Football Focus listed McDuffie as the third best cornerback prospect (11th overall) on his big board. He was ranked as the fourth best cornerback prospect by NFL analyst Bucky Brooks.

External videos
- Trent McDuffie's Combine Workout
- College Highlights : Trent McDuffie

Pre-draft measurables
Height	Weight	Arm length	Hand span	Wingspan	40-yard dash	10-yard split	20-yard split	Vertical jump	Broad jump	Bench press
5 ft 10 3/4 in (1.80 m)	193 lb (88 kg)	29 3/4 in (0.76 m)	8 3/4 in (0.22 m)	6 ft 0 3/8 in (1.84 m)	4.44 s	1.53 s	2.56 s	38.5 in (0.98 m)	10 ft 8 in (3.25 m)	15 reps
All values from NFL Combine/Pro Day

=== Kansas City Chiefs ===
==== 2022 ====
The Kansas City Chiefs selected McDuffie in the first round (21st overall) of the 2022 NFL draft. The Chiefs orchestrated a trade with the New England Patriots to acquire their first-round pick (21st overall) to immediately select McDuffie and in return sent their first (29th overall), third (94th overall), and fourth-round selections (121st overall) in the 2022 NFL draft. He was the third cornerback selected and the first of three cornerbacks selected by the Chiefs in 2022, along with fourth-round pick (135th overall) Joshua Williams and seventh-round pick (243rd overall) Jaylen Watson.

External videos
- Chiefs select Trent McDuffie No. 21
- Trent McDuffie gets the call

On May 6, 2022, the Kansas City Chiefs signed McDuffie to a four–year, $13.99 million rookie contract that is fully-guaranteed and includes a signing bonus of $7.35 million.

Throughout training camp, he competed to be the No. 2 starting cornerback against Rashad Fenton following the departures of Charvarius Ward, Deandre Baker, and Mike Hughes. Head coach Andy Reid named him the No. 2 starting cornerback to begin the season and was paired with L'Jarius Sneed.

On September 11, 2022, McDuffie made his professional regular season debut and earned his first career start in the Kansas City Chiefs' season-opener at the Arizona Cardinals and was limited to one solo tackle and 12 snaps before exiting in the first quarter of their 44–21 victory after injuring his hamstring. On September 13, 2022, the Chiefs placed him on injured reserve due to his hamstring injury he suffered in Week 1. On November 1, 2022, the Chiefs activated him off of injured reserve and added him back to their active roster after he was inactive for six games (Weeks 2–7). In Week 10, he collected seven combined tackles (four solo) and set a season-high with two pass deflections as the Chiefs defeated the Jacksonville Jaguars 27–17. On January 1, 2023, McDuffie recorded seven combined tackles (four solo), forced a fumble, and made the first sack of his career on Russell Wilson for a 12–yard loss during a 27–24 victory against the Denver Broncos. The following week, he set a season-high with six solo tackles (seven combined) and made a pass deflection during a 31–13 victory at the Las Vegas Raiders in Week 18. He finished his rookie season with 44 combined tackles (28 solo), seven passes defensed, one sack, and one forced fumble in 11 games and starts. He received an overall grade of 73.6 from Pro Football Focus as a rookie in 2022.

The Kansas City Chiefs finished the 2022 NFL season a top of the AFC West with a 14–3 record to clinch a first-round bye. On January 21, 2023, McDuffie started in his first career playoff game and made four combined tackles (three solo) and one pass deflection during a 27–20 win against the Jacksonville Jaguars in the Divisional Round. The following game, he recorded six solo tackles and made two pass deflections during a 23–20 victory against the Cincinnati Bengals in the AFC Championship Game. On February 12, 2023, McDuffie started in Super Bowl LVII where he recorded five combined tackles (four solo) in the Chiefs' 38–35 victory over the Philadelphia Eagles.

==== 2023 ====
He entered training camp slated as the de facto No. 2 starting cornerback under defensive coordinator Steve Spagnuolo. Before the start of the regular season, McDuffie officially changed his jersey number from No. 21 to No. 22 after it became available following the departure of Juan Thornhill. He wore No. 22 throughout his collegiate career at Washington as a tribute to honor his brother, Tyler McDuffie, who had died in 2015. Head coach Andy Reid named McDuffie and L'Jarius Sneed as the starting cornerbacks to begin the season.

On October 8, 2023, he recorded six solo tackles and set a season-high with three pass deflections during a 27–20 victory at the Minnesota Vikings. In Week 9, McDuffie set a season-high with 11 combined tackles (eight solo) as the Chiefs defeated the Miami Dolphins 21–14. On November 20, 2023, McDuffie made four solo tackles, forced a fumble, made a pass deflection, and set a career-high with two sacks on quarterback Jalen Hurts during a 17–21 loss against the Philadelphia Eagles. Head coach Andy Reid opted to rest his starters in Week 18 as the Chiefs won 13–12 at the Los Angeles Chargers as they had already clinched a playoff berth with a 10–6 record. He finished his second season with 80 combined tackles (60 solo), seven passes defensed, three sacks, and five forced fumbles. McDuffie was named First-team All Pro. He received an overall grade of 84.8 from Pro Football Focus, which ranked 4th amongst all qualifying cornerbacks in 2023.

The Kansas City Chiefs finished the 2023 NFL season first in their division with an 11–6 record. On January 13, 2024, McDuffie made four combined tackles (three solo) and two pass deflections as the Chiefs defeated the Miami Dolphins 26–7 in the AFC Wild-Card Game. They went on to have a 27–24 victory at the Buffalo Bills in the Divisional Round and had a 17–10 victory at the Baltimore Ravens in the AFC Championship Game. On February 11, 2024, McDuffie started in Super Bowl LVIII and had three combined tackles (two solo) and led his team with three pass deflections as the Chiefs defeated the San Francisco 49ers 25–22.

==== 2024 ====
McDuffie entered training camp slated as the de facto No. 1 starting cornerback following the departure of L'Jarius Sneed. He was named the No. 1 starting cornerback to begin the season and was paired with Jaylen Watson.

In Week 10, he set a season-high with six combined tackles (five solo) as the Chiefs defeated the Denver Broncos 16–14. On December 15, 2024, McDuffie made four solo tackles, set a season-high with three pass deflections, and had his first career interception off a pass attempt by Jameis Winston to wide receiver Michael Woods II during a 21–7 win at the Cleveland Browns. The following week, he made five combined tackles (four solo), one pass deflection, and had his second consecutive game with an interception on a pass thrown by C. J. Stroud to wide receiver Nico Collins as the Chiefs defeated the Houston Texans 27–19 in Week 16. Head coach Andy Reid chose to rest as many starters as possible, including McDuffie, as the Chiefs had already clinched a playoff berth. He received an overall grade of 83.1 from Pro Football Focus, which ranked 3rd among 222 qualifying cornerbacks in 2024.

The Kansas City Chiefs finished the 2024 NFL season with a 15–2 record to clinch a first-round bye. On January 18, 2025, McDuffie started in the Divisional Round and recorded four combined tackles (three solo) and led the team with three pass deflections during a 23–14 victory against the Texans. The following week, the Chiefs defeated the Buffalo Bills 32–29 in the AFC Championship Game. On February 9, McDuffie started in Super Bowl LIX and recorded five combined tackles (four solo) as the Chiefs lost 22–40 to the Philadelphia Eagles, ending their opportunity to win three consecutive Super Bowl games. He was ranked 81st by his fellow players on the NFL Top 100 Players of 2025.

==== 2025 ====
On April 29, 2025, the Chiefs exercised the fifth-year option in McDuffie's contract. McDuffie started all 13 of his appearances for Kansas City during the 2025 campaign, recording one interception, seven pass deflections, one forced fumble, one sack, and 63 combined tackles. On December 24, McDuffie was placed on season-ending injured reserve due to a knee injury.

=== Los Angeles Rams ===
==== 2026 ====
On March 11, 2026, McDuffie was traded to the Los Angeles Rams in exchange for the Rams' first-round (29th overall, which the Chiefs used to select Peter Woods), fifth-round and sixth-round picks in the 2026 NFL Draft and their third-round pick in the 2027 NFL Draft. Immediately after, McDuffie and the Rams agreed to a four-year, $124 million contract extension that made him the highest-paid defensive back in NFL history. When the Rams debuted their new uniforms for the upcoming season, team social media outlets showed McDuffie wearing No. 22 (as he did while playing for Kansas City), a number previously worn by running back Blake Corum, who switched to No. 24.

== NFL career statistics ==
Legend
	Won the Super Bowl
	Led the league
**Bold**	Career high

=== Regular season ===
Year	Team	Games		Tackles					Interceptions						Fumbles				
Year	Team	GP	GS	Cmb	Solo	Ast	TFL	Sck	PD	Int	Yds	Avg	Lng	TD	FF	FR	Yds	Avg	TD
2022	KC	11	11	44	28	16	1	1.0	7	0	–	–	–	–	1	0	–	–	–
2023	KC	16	16	**80**	**60**	**20**	3	**3.0**	7	0	–	–	–	–	**5**	0	–	–	–
2024	KC	16	16	59	45	14	**6**	0.5	**13**	**2**	0	0.0	0	0	1	0	–	–	–
2025	KC	13	13	63	45	18	2	1.0	7	1	**2**	**2.0**	**2**	0	1	0	–	–	–
2026	LAR	7	7	27	19	8	3	0.0	7	2	48	24.0	26	0	0	0	0	0.0	0
Career		63	63	273	197	76	15	5.5	42	5	50	10.0	26	0	8	0	0	0.0	0

=== Postseason ===
Year	Team	Games		Tackles					Interceptions						Fumbles		
Year	Team	GP	GS	Cmb	Solo	Ast	TFL	Sck	PD	Int	Yds	Avg	Lng	TD	FF	FR	TD
2022	KC	3	3	**15**	**13**	2	1	0.0	3	0	–	–	–	–	**1**	0	0
2023	KC	4	4	12	8	**4**	**2**	0.0	**7**	0	–	–	–	–	0	**1**	0
2024	KC	3	3	13	10	3	0	0.0	3	0	–	–	–	–	0	0	0
Career		10	10	40	31	9	3	0.0	13	0	0	0.0	0	0	1	1	0
