= Kyren Williams =

American football player (born 2000)

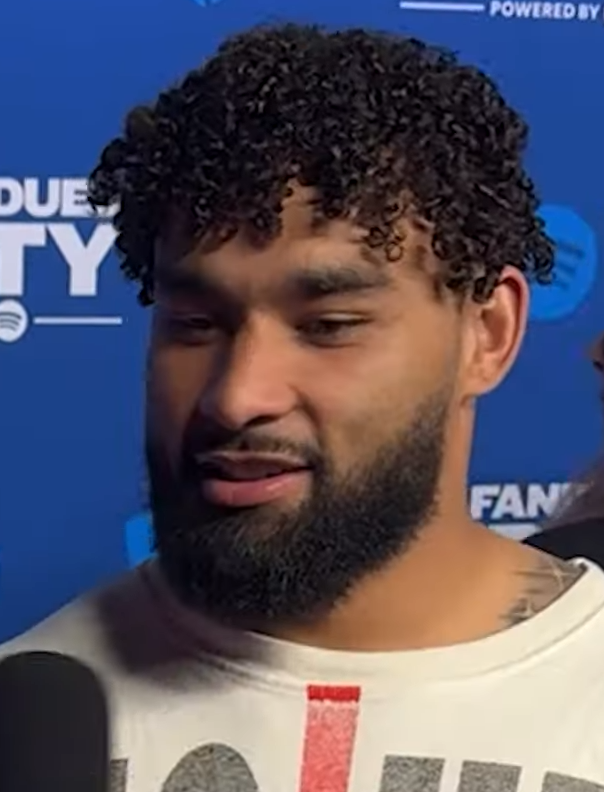
- Williams in 2025

No. 23 – Los Angeles Rams
- Position: Running back
- Roster status: Active

Personal information
- Born: August 26, 2000 (age 26); St. Louis, Missouri, U.S.
- Listed height: 5 ft 9 in (1.75 m)
- Listed weight: 207 lb (94 kg)

Career information
- High school: St. John Vianney (Kirkwood, Missouri)
- College: Notre Dame (2019–2021)
- NFL draft: 2022: 5th round, 164th overall pick

Career history
- Los Angeles Rams (2022–present)

Awards and highlights
- Second-team All-Pro (2023); Pro Bowl (2023); Second-team All-American (2021); ACC Rookie of the Year (2020); ACC Offensive Rookie of the Year (2020); Second-team All-ACC (2020)

Career NFL statistics as of Week 10, 2026
- Rushing yards: 4,450
- Rushing average: 4.6
- Rushing touchdowns: 42
- Receptions: 149
- Receiving yards: 1,012
- Receiving touchdowns: 9
- Stats at Pro Football Reference

Kyren Lawrence Williams (born August 26, 2000) is an American professional football running back for the Los Angeles Rams of the National Football League (NFL). He played college football for the Notre Dame Fighting Irish and was selected by the Rams in the fifth round of the 2022 NFL draft. Becoming a full-time starter in his second year, Williams has featured prominently in the Rams' offense ever since, with three consecutive 1,000-yard rushing seasons through 2025.

== Early life ==
Williams grew up in St. Louis, Missouri, and attended St. John Vianney High School. Williams rushed for 922 yards and 22 touchdowns and also had 51 receptions for 774 yards and 12 touchdowns in his junior season. As a senior, Williams rushed for 2,035 yards and 26 touchdowns caught 55 passes for 725 yards and 14 TDs in leading Vianney to an 11–3 record and the MSHSAA Class 5 State Championship. In the Class 5 final against Fort Osage, Williams ran for a state championship game-record 289 yards in the Golden Griffins' 28–14 victory and was later named the St. Louis Metro Area Offensive Player of the Year. He also recorded 92 tackles, eight tackles for loss, five sacks and eight interceptions on defense. Williams was rated a three-star recruit and committed to play college football for the Notre Dame Fighting Irish over offers from Michigan, Michigan State, Stanford and Wisconsin.

== College career ==
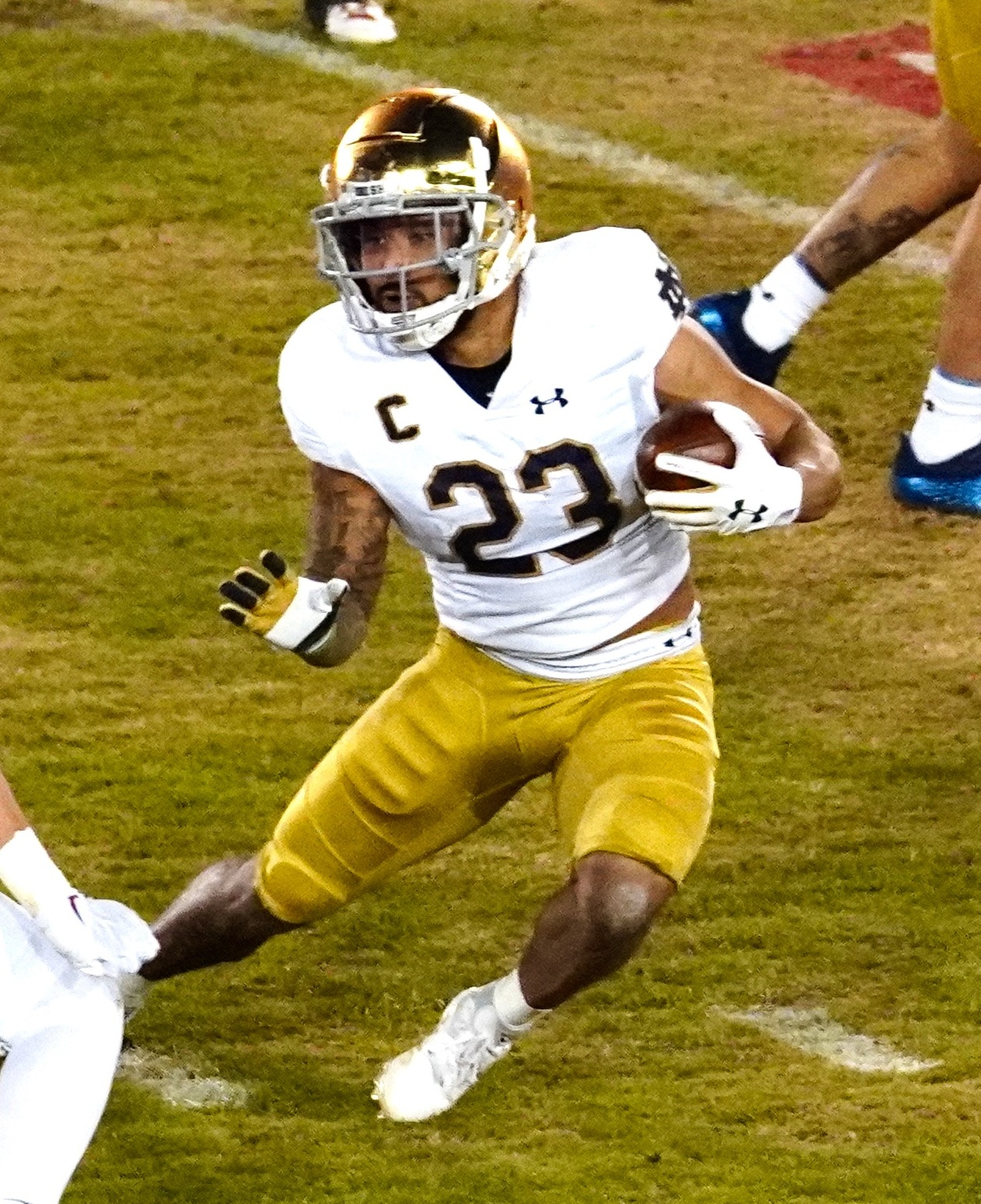
Williams with the Notre Dame Fighting Irish in 2021

Williams joined the Notre Dame Fighting Irish as an early enrollee. As a true freshman in 2019, he played in the first four games of the season before sitting the rest of the year in order to preserve an extra year of eligibility, rushing for 26 yards on four carries and catching one pass for three yards.

Williams was named Notre Dame's starting running back going into his sophomore year in 2020. He was named the Atlantic Coast Conference (ACC) Running Back of the Week for the first week of the season after rushing 19 times for 112 yards and two touchdowns while also catching two passes for 93 yards. Williams finished the season with 1,125 rushing yards and 13 touchdowns on 211 carries while also catching 35 passes for 313 yards and one touchdown and was named second-team All-ACC, the ACC Offensive Rookie of the Year, and the overall ACC Rookie of the Year.

Going into his junior season, Williams remained Notre Dame's starting running back. His biggest games came in the middle of the season when he had 25 carries for 138 yards and two touchdowns and six receptions for 42 yards in a 31–16 victory over USC, followed by 21 carries for 199 yards and a TD in a 44–34 win against North Carolina. Williams finished the season with 204 carries for 1,002 yards and 14 TDs with 42 receptions for 359 yards and three touchdowns. On December 10, 2021, Williams declared for the 2022 NFL draft and opted out of playing in the Fiesta Bowl.

== Professional career ==
Pre-draft measurables
| Height | Weight | Arm length | Hand span | Wingspan | 40-yard dash | 10-yard split | 20-yard split | 20-yard shuttle | Three-cone drill | Vertical jump | Broad jump |
|---|---|---|---|---|---|---|---|---|---|---|---|
| 5 ft 9 1/4 in (1.76 m) | 194 lb (88 kg) | 28 5/8 in (0.73 m) | 9 in (0.23 m) | 5 ft 9 7/8 in (1.77 m) | 4.65 s | 1.57 s | 2.69 s | 4.33 s | 7.07 s | 32.0 in (0.81 m) | 9 ft 8 in (2.95 m) |
All values from NFL Combine/Pro Day

Williams was selected by the Los Angeles Rams in the fifth round (164th overall) of the 2022 NFL draft. On June 7, 2022, it was announced that Williams had suffered a broken foot in practice and had undergone surgery.

=== 2022 season ===
After not playing in the preseason, on September 8, 2022, Williams suffered a high ankle sprain on the first kick return in the Rams' season-opening 31–10 loss to the Buffalo Bills. He was placed on injured reserve on September 13, 2022, was designated to return October 26, 2022, and was activated from injured reserve on November 12, 2022. As a rookie, Williams appeared in 10 games and received significant offensive snaps in eight of them. For the season, he recorded 35 carries for 139 yards and nine receptions for 76 yards but did not score a touchdown.

=== 2023 season ===
In the season opener against the Seattle Seahawks, Williams carried 15 times for 52 yards and scored his first two career touchdowns in a 30–13 win on the road. The following week at home against San Francisco, he supplanted Cam Akers as the Rams' starting running back and had 14 carries for 52 yards and a touchdown while also catching six passes for 48 yards and another touchdown in the Rams' 30–23 defeat. He became the first player in franchise history to score multiple touchdowns in each of his first two games of a season. On the road at Indianapolis in Week 4, Williams recorded his first career 100-yard rushing game, totaling 103 yards on 25 carries with two touchdowns in the Rams' 29–23 overtime victory against the Colts. During Week 6 against the Arizona Cardinals, Williams finished with a season-high 158 rushing yards and a touchdown on 20 carries as the Rams won 26–9 but sprained his left ankle in the process. Placed on injured reserve on October 21, 2023, Williams was re-activated on November 25, 2023, after missing four games. Returning to the starting lineup in Week 12 at Arizona, Williams finished with 143 rushing yards on 16 carries and added 61 receiving yards on six catches with a pair of touchdown receptions as the Rams won 37–14. This performance earned Williams NFC Offensive Player of the Week honors, and was the start of an impressive six-game stretch in which he averaged 5.3 yards per carry and 114.7 yards per game. Williams ran 21 times for 88 yards and a touchdown in a 36–19 win over the Cleveland Browns, then had 114 yards on 25 carries in a 37–31 overtime loss at the Baltimore Ravens. Against the Washington Commanders, Williams had 27 carries for 152 yards and a touchdown run in the Rams' 28–20 victory. Four days later, Williams turned in his third straight 100-yard rushing game, totaling 104 yards (including a 10-yard TD) on 22 carries as the Rams defeated the visiting New Orleans Saints 30–22. In the game, Williams became the first Rams running back to surpass 1,000 yards rushing since Todd Gurley in 2018. In Week 17 at the New York Giants, Williams had 87 yards on 20 carries but scored a career-high three touchdowns in the Rams' playoff-clinching 26–25 victory. The following week, Williams was named to the Pro Bowl for the first time in his career. He was also named as a second team All-Pro. Williams was held out of the Rams' 21–20 victory over San Francisco in the final week of the regular season. He finished the 2023 season with 228 carries for 1,144 rushing yards and 12 rushing touchdowns to go along with 32 receptions for 206 receiving yards and three receiving touchdowns in 12 appearances and 11 starts. Williams ran for 61 yards on 13 carries in the Rams' 24–23 loss to Detroit in an NFC Wild Card Game. He was ranked 78th by his fellow players on the NFL Top 100 Players of 2024.

=== 2024 season ===
Beginning the season as the starting running back, Williams scored one touchdown in each of the Rams' first two games, both losses on the road to the Detroit Lions and the Arizona Cardinals. Playing at home against San Francisco in Week 3, Williams scored all three of his team's touchdowns in a 27–24 victory. He ran 24 times for 89 yards and two touchdowns while also catching two passes for 27 yards and a touchdown which came on a 15-yard reception where Williams somersaulted over 49er strong safety Talanoa Hufanga at the goal line in the second quarter for the Rams' first points. In a 24–19 loss to Green Bay, Williams had 22 carries for 102 yards and a touchdown as the Rams fell to a 1–4 record. Following a bye week, Williams ran 21 times for 76 yards and two scores in the Rams' 20–15 victory over the Las Vegas Raiders. Four days later, against the Minnesota Vikings, Williams had 23 carries for 97 yards while also catching five passes for 19 yards including a 5-yard touchdown, which gave Williams a touchdown in 10 straight regular season games. At New Orleans in Week 13, Williams ran for 104 yards on only 15 carries with a touchdown in the Rams' 21–14 victory. A week later, Williams scored two touchdowns as the Rams outlasted the Buffalo Bills 44–42, and his 29 carries for 87 yards put him over 1,000 yards rushing for the season. Williams followed up that performance by running for 108 yards (again on 29 carries) as the Rams gutted out a 12–6 victory over San Francisco, and a season-high 122 yards (on 23 carries) and a touchdown in a 19–9 win against the New York Jets. In Week 17, Williams totaled 56 yards on 13 carries with a touchdown run in Rams' 13–9 win over Arizona that led to the Rams clinching the NFC West title. After sitting out the team's regular season finale against Seattle, Williams had 76 yards on 16 rushing attempts while also catching three passes for 16 yards, including a 5-yard touchdown reception for the Rams' first points in their 27–9 victory against Minnesota in an NFC Wild Card Round. A week later in an NFC Divisional Round against Philadelphia, Williams ran for 106 yards on 19 carries but lost a critical fumble in the fourth quarter of the Rams' 28–22 loss. He was ranked 85th by his fellow players on the NFL Top 100 Players of 2025.

=== 2025 season ===
On August 5, 2025, Williams signed a three-year, $33 million contract extension with the Rams. In Week 5 versus San Francisco, Williams caught eight passes for 66 yards and two touchdowns and ran for 65 yards on 14 carries, but fumbled at the 1-yard line on a first-and-goal play with 1:07 remaining. Then in overtime, Williams was stopped for no gain on a fourth-and-1 play at the San Francisco 11 that allowed the 49ers to escape with a 26–23 victory. Against New Orleans in Week 8, Williams ran 25 times for 114 yards (both single-game highs for the season) and a touchdown in the Rams' 34–10 rout of the Saints. Williams had 15 carries for 78 yards and two touchdowns in L.A.'s 41–34 victory over Detroit, while also surpassing 1,000 rushing yards for the third straight season, becoming the first Rams running back to do so since Steven Jackson (who had eight straight 1,000-yard rushing seasons from 2005 to 2012). On December 4, 2025, Williams was named the Rams' Walter Payton NFL Man of the Year nominee. Williams finished the regular season with 1,252 rushing yards on 259 carries with 10 touchdowns (his third straight season scoring 10 or more rushing touchdowns), while also catching 36 passes for 281 yards and three scores (all career single-season highs).

Against Carolina in an NFC Wild Card Round playoff game on January 10, 2026, Williams ran the ball 13 times for 57 yards and had two receptions for 18 yards, including a 13-yard touchdown reception in the fourth quarter of the Rams' 34–31 victory over the Panthers. Just over a week later in the NFC Divisional Round at Chicago, Williams had 21 carries for 87 yards and two touchdowns (the first postseason rushing scores of his career) while also catching four passes for 30 yards in the Rams' 20–17 overtime victory against the Bears. Rematching with Seattle in the NFC Championship Game, Williams caught a 9-yard touchdown pass with 1:55 remaining in the second quarter to put the Rams ahead of the Seahawks 13–10 in what would turn out to their only lead of the game. Williams had 10 carries for 39 yards and two receptions for 22 yards in the Rams' 31–27 loss. He was ranked 89th by his fellow players on the NFL Top 100 Players of 2026.

=== 2026 season ===
In the season opener against San Francisco in Melbourne, Australia, Williams scored the game's first touchdown on a 5-yard run at the start of the second quarter. He finished with 11 carries for 41 yards in the Rams' 27–7 loss. Williams had 12 carries for 85 yards and scored on a 10-yard pass from Matthew Stafford in the Rams' 28–6 win over the New York Giants. Though held out of the end zone in Week 3, Williams had 15 carries for 88 yards and six catches for 70 yards in L.A.'s 30–26 loss at Denver. Against Philadelphia in Week 4, Williams scored two touchdowns in the final four minutes of the Rams' 24–20 come-from-behind victory. For the game, Williams had 16 carries for 80 yards and caught a single-game career high 10 receptions for 67 yards. After being held to just 50 yards on 10 rushes in L.A.'s 18–16 loss to the Arizona Cardinals in Week 6, Williams expressed his frustration when asked why he thought the team's energy level was inconsistent from drive to drive, saying, "I can't tell you, bro. Probably because I'm not out there." A week later, Williams rushed for 99 yards and a touchdown on 16 carries in the Rams' 35–21 victory over the Las Vegas Raiders. Against the Los Angeles Chargers in Week 8, Williams scored on a 1-yard run just before halftime to help the Rams take a 10–9 lead, then later carried the ball 11 times for 41 yards on a 12-play drive that consumed the final 6:39 to seal a 24–9 win.

== Career statistics ==
Legend
| | Led the league |
| **Bold** | Career high |

=== NFL ===
==== Regular season ====
| Year | Team | Games | | Rushing | | | | | | Receiving | | | | | Fumbles | |
| Year | Team | GP | GS | Att | Yds | Avg | Y/G | Lng | TD | Rec | Yds | Avg | Lng | TD | Fum | Lost |
|---|---|---|---|---|---|---|---|---|---|---|---|---|---|---|---|---|
| 2022 | LAR | 10 | 0 | 35 | 139 | 4.0 | 13.9 | 17 | 0 | 9 | 76 | **8.4** | 15 | 0 | 0 | 0 |
| 2023 | LAR | 12 | 11 | 228 | 1,144 | **5.0** | **95.3** | **56** | 12 | 32 | 206 | 6.4 | 24 | **3** | 3 | 2 |
| 2024 | LAR | 16 | 16 | **316** | **1,299** | 4.1 | 81.2 | 30 | **14** | 34 | 182 | 5.4 | 26 | 2 | **5** | **3** |
| 2025 | LAR | 17 | 17 | 259 | 1,252 | 4.8 | 73.6 | 34 | 10 | **36** | **281** | 7.8 | **30** | **3** | 2 | 2 |
| 2026 | LAR | 10 | 10 | 139 | 616 | 4.4 | 61.6 | 30 | 6 | 38 | 267 | 7.0 | 20 | 1 | 2 | 2 |
| Career | | 65 | 54 | 977 | 4,450 | 4.6 | 68.5 | 56 | 42 | 149 | 1,023 | 6.8 | 30 | 9 | 12 | 9 |

==== Postseason ====
| Year | Team | Games | | Rushing | | | | | | Receiving | | | | | Fumbles | |
| Year | Team | GP | GS | Att | Yds | Avg | Y/G | Lng | TD | Rec | Yds | Avg | Lng | TD | Fum | Lost |
|---|---|---|---|---|---|---|---|---|---|---|---|---|---|---|---|---|
| 2023 | LAR | 1 | 1 | 13 | 61 | 4.7 | 61.0 | 15 | 0 | 1 | 9 | **9.0** | 9 | 0 | 0 | 0 |
| 2024 | LAR | 2 | 2 | 35 | 182 | **5.2** | **91.0** | **30** | 0 | 4 | 15 | 3.8 | 6 | 1 | **1** | **1** |
| 2025 | LAR | 3 | 3 | **44** | **183** | 4.2 | 61.0 | 10 | **2** | **8** | **70** | 8.8 | **14** | **2** | 0 | 0 |
| Career | | 6 | 6 | 92 | 426 | 4.6 | 71.0 | 30 | 2 | 13 | 94 | 7.2 | 14 | 3 | 1 | 1 |

=== College ===
| Season | Team | Games | | Rushing | | | | | Receiving | | | | |
| Season | Team | GP | GS | Att | Yds | Avg | Lng | TD | Rec | Yds | Avg | Lng | TD |
|---|---|---|---|---|---|---|---|---|---|---|---|---|---|
| 2019 | Notre Dame | 4 | 0 | 4 | 26 | **6.5** | 14 | 0 | 1 | 3 | 3.0 | 3 | 0 |
| 2020 | Notre Dame | 12 | 12 | **211** | **1,125** | 5.3 | 65 | 13 | 35 | 313 | **8.9** | **75** | 1 |
| 2021 | Notre Dame | 12 | 12 | 204 | 1,002 | 4.9 | **91** | **14** | **42** | **359** | 8.5 | 55 | **3** |
| Career | | 28 | 24 | 419 | 2,153 | 5.1 | 91 | 27 | 78 | 675 | 8.7 | 75 | 4 |

== Personal life ==
Williams is a Christian. Williams is a first cousin of Detroit Lions wide receiver Jameson Williams.
