= Coram Deo Classical Academy =

Location
- 132 S. Virginia Avenue; Bartlesville, Oklahoma; United States; 36°45′07″N 95°59′21″W

Information
- Established: 1995
- Administrator: Dr. Kevin Dray
- Staff: 8
- Teaching staff: 6.1 (FTE) (as of 2007-08)
- Grades: PreK–8
- Enrollment: 44 (as of 2012-13)
- Average class size: 9
- Student to teacher ratio: 7.5 (as of 2012-13)
- Colors: Copper and black
- Slogan: Building Christian Thinkers
- Athletics: Basketball, football, volleyball
- Mascot: Lions
- Nickname: CDCA
- Team name: Lions
- Website: cdcab.org

Coram Deo Classical Academy is a private Christian school in Bartlesville, Oklahoma, United States. Founded in 1995, the school serves approximately 44 students in kindergarten through eighth grades. The school has completed restructuring to serve grades K-8 for 2013-2014 and projects adding one additional grade each year until k-12 is re-established. Coram Deo is a Latin phrase that means in the presence of God.

== History ==
American Christian School was established under the joint sponsorship of Grace Baptist and Westminster Presbyterian churches. The high school program began with a class of four ninth grade students in the 1995–1996 school year, meeting in a private home. Classes were moved into the building of Grace Baptist Church the following year and remained there until 1999, when the school began occupying the upstairs of Virginia Avenue Baptist Church. The school expanded to kindergarten through twelfth grade in 2000 and moved into its present location in 2012.

In June 2012, the name of the school was changed to Coram Deo Classical Academy, and the location was moved to the education building on the campus of Virginia Avenue Baptist Church at 132 S. Virginia Avenue.

The school is accredited through the Association of Christian Teachers and Schools and recognized by the Oklahoma Private School Accreditation Commission.

== Campus ==
Coram Deo Classical Academy is located on the campus of Virginia Avenue Baptist Church at 132 S. Virginia Avenue in Bartlesville.

== Curriculum ==
The school curriculum has an emphasis on Classical Christian education. Latin is offered at the elementary level and Greek in high school. Logic and rhetoric are offered from eighth grade through high school.

Speech and debate is offered as an elective beginning in sixth grade. The school's speech and debate team won the 3A state championship title in 2008 and 2009.

== Extracurricular activities ==
Students play basketball, volleyball, and 8-man football with Wesleyan Christian School. Students can co-op with Bartlesville High School for soccer, baseball and swimming.
