= 2014 St. Louis Rams season =

NFL team season

- Owner: Stan Kroenke
- General manager: Les Snead
- Head coach: Jeff Fisher
- Home stadium: Edward Jones Dome

Results
- Record: 6–10
- Division place: 4th NFC West
- Playoffs: Did not qualify
- Pro Bowlers: Aaron Donald, DT; Robert Quinn, DE

Uniform
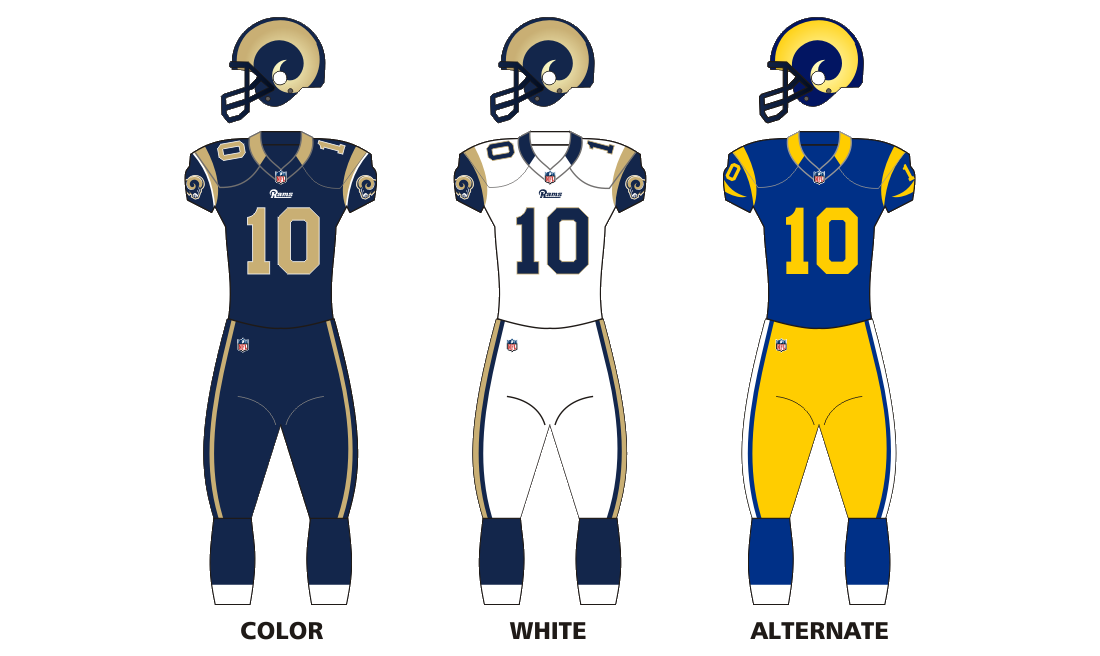

The 2014 season was the St. Louis Rams' 77th in the National Football League (NFL), their 20th in St. Louis and their third under head coach Jeff Fisher. The Rams attempted to reach a playoff berth for the first time since their 2004 season, but were officially eliminated in their loss against the Arizona Cardinals in Week 15. The Rams failed to improve on their 7–9 record from 2013, finishing 6–10 in 2014. The Rams' 2014 season was notable for their numerous starting quarterbacks including Austin Davis, Shaun Hill, and Sam Bradford, the last of whom was injured before the season began. Despite the lack of stability at the position, the Rams defeated both defending conference champions, Super Bowl participants, and 2014 division winners, the Seattle Seahawks and Denver Broncos, plus also shutting out two teams in consecutive weeks: the Oakland Raiders and Washington Redskins. This represents the most recent last-place finish in the NFC West for the St. Louis/Los Angeles Rams.

== 2014 draft class ==
2014 St. Louis Rams draft
| Round | Selection | Player | Position | College |
|---|---|---|---|---|
| 1 | 2 | Greg Robinson | Offensive tackle | Auburn |
| 1 | 13 | Aaron Donald | Defensive tackle | Pittsburgh |
| 2 | 41 | Lamarcus Joyner | Cornerback | Florida State |
| 3 | 75 | Tre Mason | Running back | Auburn |
| 4 | 110 | Maurice Alexander | Safety | Utah St. |
| 5 | None | | | |
| 6 | 188 | E. J. Gaines | Cornerback | Missouri |
| 6 | 214 | Garrett Gilbert | Quarterback | SMU |
| 7 | 226 | Mitchell Van Dyk | Offensive tackle | Portland St. |
| 7 | 241 | Christian Bryant | Free safety | Ohio St. |
| 7 | 249 | Michael Sam | Defensive end | Missouri |
| 7 | 250 | Demetrius Rhaney | Center | Tennessee St. |

| Compensatory selection |

Draft trades

- The Rams acquired an additional first-round selection (No. 2 overall) as part of a trade that sent the team's 2012 first-round selection (Robert Griffin III) to the Washington Redskins.
- The Rams traded their second- (No. 44 overall) and fifth- (No. 153 overall) round selections to the Buffalo Bills in exchange for the Bills' second-round selection (No. 41 overall).
- The Rams acquired an additional seventh-round selection (No. 241 overall) in a trade that sent cornerback Josh Gordy to the Indianapolis Colts.

== Staff ==
2014 St. Louis Rams staff
| Front office: Owner/chairman – Stan Kroenke; Owner/vice chairman – Chip Rosenbloom; Executive vice president of football operations/coo – Kevin Demoff; general manager – Les Snead; Director of college scouting – Brad Holmes; Director of player personnel – Taylor Morton; Director of pro personnel – Ran Carthon; Head coaches: Executive vice president/head coach – Jeff Fisher; Assistant head coach – Dave McGinnis; Offensive coaches: Offensive coordinator – Brian Schottenheimer; Quarterbacks – Frank Cignetti Jr.; Running backs – Ben Sirmans; Wide receivers – Ray Sherman; Tight ends – Rob Boras; Offensive line – Paul Boudreau; Assistant offensive line – Andy Dickerson; Offensive assistant – Kenan Smith; Offensive quality control – Andy Sugarman | Defensive coaches: Defensive coordinator – Gregg Williams; Defensive line – Mike Waufle; Assistant defensive line – Clyde Simmons; Linebackers – Frank Bush; Assistant linebackers – Joe Bowden; Secondary – Chuck Cecil; Assistant secondary – Brandon Fisher; Defensive quality control – Dennard Wilson; Special teams coaches: Special teams coordinator – John Fassel; Assistant special teams coordinator – Paul Boudreau, Jr.; Strength and conditioning: Head strength and conditioning – Rock Gullickson; Assistant strength and conditioning – Adam Bailey; Assistant strength and conditioning – J. Aggabao |

== Final roster ==
2014 St. Louis Rams roster
| Quarterbacks (QB): 9 Austin Davis; 14 Shaun Hill; Running backs (RB): 36 Benny Cunningham KR; 46 Cory Harkey FB; 27 Tre Mason; 34 Chase Reynolds; 30 Zac Stacy; 42 Trey Watts; Wide receivers (WR): 11 Tavon Austin PR; 12 Stedman Bailey; 81 Kenny Britt; 13 Chris Givens; Tight ends (TE): 82 Alex Bayer; 89 Jared Cook; 48 Justice Cunningham; 88 Lance Kendricks | Offensive linemen (OL): 61 Tim Barnes C; 72 Joe Barksdale T; 67 Barrett Jones G; 69 Davin Joseph G; 73 Mike Person T; 79 Greg Robinson T/G; 76 Rodger Saffold G; 70 Brandon Washington G; 63 Scott Wells C; Defensive linemen (DL): 90 Michael Brockers DT; 92 Alex Carrington DE; 99 Aaron Donald DT; 95 William Hayes DE; 98 Kendall Langford DT; 91 Chris Long DE; 94 Robert Quinn DE; 97 Eugene Sims DE; 93 Ethan Westbrooks DE | Linebackers (LB): 26 Mark Barron OLB; 53 Daren Bates MLB; 58 Jo-Lonn Dunbar OLB; 54 Will Herring OLB; 55 James Laurinaitis MLB; 52 Alec Ogletree OLB; 59 Korey Toomer OLB; Defensive backs (DB): 31 Maurice Alexander SS; 38 Cody Davis FS; 33 E. J. Gaines CB; 22 Trumaine Johnson CB; 20 Lamarcus Joyner FS; 25 T. J. McDonald SS; 23 Rodney McLeod FS; 47 Marcus Roberson CB; 21 Janoris Jenkins CB; Special teams (ST): 6 Johnny Hekker P; 44 Jake McQuaide LS; 4 Greg Zuerlein K | Practice squad: 66 Steven Baker T; 16 Emory Blake WR; 60 Travis Bond G; 37 Christian Bryant S; 71 Matthew Conrath DE; 51 Marshall McFadden LB; 47 Brad Smelley TE; 96 Doug Worthington DT; 19 Devon Wylie WR; Reserve: 8 Sam Bradford QB (IR); 86 Mason Brodine TE (IR); 77 Jake Long T (IR); 32 Brandon McGee CB (IR); 24 Isaiah Pead RB (IR); 83 Brian Quick WR (IR); 65 Demetrius Rhaney C (IR); Rookies in italics 53 active, 7 reserve, 9 practice squad |

== Schedule ==
=== Preseason ===
The season took a turn for the worse when starting QB Sam Bradford tore his ACL against the Cleveland Browns on August 23. It was the same ACL he tore the year before that caused him to miss the last half of the year.

| Week | Date | Opponent | Result | Record | Venue | Recap |
|---|---|---|---|---|---|---|
| 1 | August 8 | New Orleans Saints | **L** 24–26 | 0–1 | Edward Jones Dome | Recap |
| 2 | August 16 | Green Bay Packers | **L** 7–21 | 0–2 | Edward Jones Dome | Recap |
| 3 | August 23 | at Cleveland Browns | **W** 33–14 | 1–2 | FirstEnergy Stadium | Recap |
| 4 | August 28 | at Miami Dolphins | **L** 13–14 | 1–3 | Sun Life Stadium | Recap |

=== Regular season ===
| Week | Date | Opponent | Result | Record | Venue | Recap |
|---|---|---|---|---|---|---|
| 1 | September 7 | Minnesota Vikings | **L** 6–34 | 0–1 | Edward Jones Dome | Recap |
| 2 | September 14 | at Tampa Bay Buccaneers | **W** 19–17 | 1–1 | Raymond James Stadium | Recap |
| 3 | September 21 | Dallas Cowboys | **L** 31–34 | 1–2 | Edward Jones Dome | Recap |
| 4 | Bye | | | | | |
| 5 | October 5 | at Philadelphia Eagles | **L** 28–34 | 1–3 | Lincoln Financial Field | Recap |
| 6 | October 13 | **San Francisco 49ers** | **L** 17–31 | 1–4 | Edward Jones Dome | Recap |
| 7 | October 19 | **Seattle Seahawks** | **W** 28–26 | 2–4 | Edward Jones Dome | Recap |
| 8 | October 26 | at Kansas City Chiefs | **L** 7–34 | 2–5 | Arrowhead Stadium | Recap |
| 9 | November 2 | at **San Francisco 49ers** | **W** 13–10 | 3–5 | Levi's Stadium | Recap |
| 10 | November 9 | at **Arizona Cardinals** | **L** 14–31 | 3–6 | University of Phoenix Stadium | Recap |
| 11 | November 16 | Denver Broncos | **W** 22–7 | 4–6 | Edward Jones Dome | Recap |
| 12 | November 23 | at San Diego Chargers | **L** 24–27 | 4–7 | Qualcomm Stadium | Recap |
| 13 | November 30 | Oakland Raiders | **W** 52–0 | 5–7 | Edward Jones Dome | Recap |
| 14 | December 7 | at Washington Redskins | **W** 24–0 | 6–7 | FedExField | Recap |
| 15 | December 11 | **Arizona Cardinals** | **L** 6–12 | 6–8 | Edward Jones Dome | Recap |
| 16 | December 21 | New York Giants | **L** 27–37 | 6–9 | Edward Jones Dome | Recap |
| 17 | December 28 | at **Seattle Seahawks** | **L** 6–20 | 6–10 | CenturyLink Field | Recap |

Note: Intra-division opponents are in bold text.

=== Game summaries ===
==== Week 1: vs. Minnesota Vikings ====
Week One: Minnesota Vikings at St. Louis Rams – Game summary

| Quarter | 1 | 2 | 3 | 4 | Total |
|---|---|---|---|---|---|
| **Vikings** | 3 | 10 | 7 | 14 | **34** |
| Rams | 0 | 0 | 3 | 3 | **6** |

at Edward Jones Dome, St. Louis, Missouri

- Date: September 7
- Game time: 12:00 p.m. CDT
- Game weather: Played indoors (dome stadium)
- Game attendance: 55,919
- Referee: Ed Hochuli
- TV announcers (Fox): Dick Stockton, Kirk Morrison and Kristina Pink
- Recap, Gamebook

Game information

**First quarter**

- MIN – Blair Walsh 52-yard field goal, 09:40 (MIN 3–0)

**Second quarter**

- MIN – Blair Walsh 46-yard field goal, 14:21 (MIN 6–0)
- MIN – Greg Jennings 8-yard pass from Matt Cassel, Blair Walsh kick, 00:26 (MIN 13–0)

**Third quarter**

- STL – Greg Zuerlein 56-yard field goal, 10:17 (MIN 13–3)
- MIN – Cordarrelle Patterson 67-yard run, Blair Walsh kick, 02:08 (MIN 20–3)

**Fourth quarter**

- MIN – Kyle Rudolph 7-yard pass from Matt Cassel, Blair Walsh kick, 06:35 (MIN 27–3)
- MIN – Harrison Smith 81-yard interception return, Blair Walsh kick, 03:18 (MIN 34–3)
- STL – Greg Zuerlein 46-yard field goal, 01:35 (MIN 34–6)

**Top passers**

- MIN – Matt Cassel, 17/25, 170 Yds, 2 TD
- STL – Austin Davis, 16/23, 192 Yds, INT

**Top rushers**

- MIN – Cordarrelle Patterson, 3 Car, 102 Yds, TD
- STL – Zac Stacy, 11 Car, 43 Yds

**Top receivers**

- MIN – Greg Jennings, 6 Rec, 58 Yds, TD
- STL – Brian Quick, 7 Rec, 99 Yds

**Top tacklers**

- MIN – Robert Blanton, 7 Tkls
- STL – Janoris Jenkins, 6 Tkls

St. Louis got off to a grim start as the visiting Vikings dominated throughout, with the Rams' only points coming on a pair of field goals by kicker Greg Zuerlein. Already missing starting quarterback Sam Bradford for the year with another knee injury suffered during the preseason, the Rams lost several more starters during the game; defensive end Chris Long was hampered by an ankle injury which forced him to miss two months, and new starting quarterback Shaun Hill was knocked out of the game with an injured quadriceps just before halftime. Unknown third-string quarterback Austin Davis, took over in the second half and would go on to start the next eight games. The game marked the professional football debut of rookie defensive tackle Aaron Donald, who had four tackles including two for negative yardage in the loss.

==== Week 2: at Tampa Bay Buccaneers ====
Week Two: St. Louis Rams at Tampa Bay Buccaneers – Game summary

| Quarter | 1 | 2 | 3 | 4 | Total |
|---|---|---|---|---|---|
| **Rams** | 7 | 3 | 3 | 6 | **19** |
| Buccaneers | 7 | 0 | 7 | 3 | **17** |

at Raymond James Stadium, Tampa, Florida

- Date: September 14
- Game time: 4:05 p.m. EDT/3:05 pm. CDT
- Game weather: 88 °F (31 °C), cloudy
- Game attendance: 59,923
- Referee: Jeff Triplette
- TV announcers (Fox): Dick Stockton, Kirk Morrison and Kristina Pink
- Recap, Gamebook

Game information

**First quarter**

- TB – Josh McCown 5-yard rush, Patrick Murray kick, 8:56 (TB 7–0)
- STL – Zac Stacy 2-yard run, Greg Zuerlein kick, 3:07 (Tied 7–7)

**Second quarter**

- STL – Greg Zuerlein 36-yard field goal, 0:39 (STL 10–7)

**Third quarter**

- TB – Josh McCown 1 yard run, Patrick Murray kick, 9:18 (TB 14–10)
- STL – Greg Zuerlein 35-yard field goal, 2:41 (TB 14–13)

**Fourth quarter**

- STL – Greg Zuerlein 46-yard field goal, 9:10 (STL 16–14)
- TB – Patrick Murray 36-yard field goal, 5:15 (TB 17–16)
- STL – Greg Zuerlein 38-yard field goal, 0:38 (STL 19–17)

**Top passers**

- STL – Austin Davis 22/29, 235 Yds
- TB – Josh McCown 16/21, 179 Yds, INT

**Top rushers**

- STL – Zac Stacy 19 Att, 71 Yds, TD
- TB – Bobby Rainey 22 Att, 144 Yds

**Top receivers**

- STL – Brian Quick 7 Rec, 74 Yds
- TB – Vincent Jackson 4 Rec, 51 Yds

**Top tacklers**

- STL – E.J. Gaines 5 Tkls
- TB – Dashon Goldson 7 Tkls, 2 Ast

Austin Davis got first start at quarterback for the Rams, completing 22 of 29 passes for 235 yards. Most of the game was delayed due to lightning and thunder after the game was tied 7-7. Running back Zac Stacy ran for 71 yards on 19 carries with a 2-yard run in the first quarter. Rams kicker Greg Zuerlein converted four field goals, the last a 38-yarder with 38 seconds remaining for the game-winner. Wide receiver Brian Quick caught seven passes for 74 yards for St. Louis.

==== Week 3: vs. Dallas Cowboys ====
Week Three: Dallas Cowboys at St. Louis Rams – Game summary

| Quarter | 1 | 2 | 3 | 4 | Total |
|---|---|---|---|---|---|
| **Cowboys** | 0 | 10 | 10 | 14 | **34** |
| Rams | 7 | 14 | 0 | 10 | **31** |

at Edward Jones Dome, St. Louis, Missouri

- Date: September 21
- Game time: 12:00 pm. CDT
- Game weather: Played indoors (dome stadium)
- Game attendance: 58,739
- Referee: Clete Blakeman
- TV announcers (Fox): Kenny Albert, Daryl Johnston and Tony Siragusa
- Recap, Gamebook

Game information

**First quarter**

- STL – Lance Kendricks 1 yard pass from Austin Davis, Greg Zuerlein kick, 6:10 (STL 7–0)

**Second quarter**

- STL – Brian Quick 51-yard pass from Austin Davis, Greg Zuerlein kick, 14:54 (STL 14–0)
- STL – Janoris Jenkins 25 interception return, Greg Zuerlein kick, 6:06 (STL 21–0)
- DAL – DeMarco Murray 1 yard run, Dan Bailey kick, 2:07 (STL 21–7)
- DAL – Dan Bailey 29-yard field goal, 0:02 (STL 21–10)

**Third quarter**

- DAL – Dez Bryant 68-yard pass from Tony Romo, Dan Bailey Kick, 12:48 (STL 21–17)
- DAL – Dan Bailey 40-yard field goal, 2:43 (STL 21–20)

**Fourth quarter**

- STL – Greg Zuerlein 28-yard field goal, 13:28 (STL 24–20)
- DAL – Terrance Williams 12-yard pass from Tony Romo, Dan Bailey kick, 6:13 (DAL 27–24)
- DAL – Bruce Carter 25-yard interception return, Dan Bailey kick, 5:58 (DAL 34–24)
- STL – Austin Pettis 4-yard pass from Austin Davis, Greg Zuerlein kick, 2:36 (DAL 34–31)

**Top passers**

- DAL – Tony Romo 18/23, 217 Yds, 2 TD, INT
- STL – Austin Davis 30/42, 327 Yds, 3 TD, 2 INT

**Top rushers**

- DAL – DeMarco Murray 24 Att, 100 Yds, TD
- STL – Zac Stacy 12 Att, 67 Yds

**Top receivers**

- DAL – Dez Bryant 6 Rec, 89 Yds, TD
- STL – Jared Cook 7 Rec, 75 Yds

**Top tacklers**

- DAL – Anthony Hitchens 10 Tkls
- STL – Alec Ogletree 10 Tkls

The Rams started off hot early and took a 21–0 lead well into the second quarter. But the visiting Cowboys responded in the second half, including a Tony Romo touchdown pass to Dez Bryant for 68 yards early in the third period which stunned the St. Louis home crowd. In the fourth quarter, Rams tight end Jared Cook caught seven receptions for 75 yards, but his temper snapped on the sidelines as he shoved quarterback Austin Davis after he failed to find Cook in the end zone on an incomplete pass attempt. Davis completed 30 of 42 passes for 327 yards and three touchdown passes but threw two interceptions as the Rams fell to 1–2.

==== Week 5: at Philadelphia Eagles ====
Week Five: St. Louis Rams at Philadelphia Eagles – Game summary

| Quarter | 1 | 2 | 3 | 4 | Total |
|---|---|---|---|---|---|
| Rams | 0 | 7 | 7 | 14 | **28** |
| **Eagles** | 13 | 7 | 14 | 0 | **34** |

at Lincoln Financial Field, Philadelphia, Pennsylvania

- Date: October 5
- Game time: 1:00 pm. EDT/12:00 pm. CDT
- Game weather: 59 °F (15 °C), mostly sunny
- Game attendance: 69,596
- Referee: Bill Vinovich
- TV announcers (Fox): Kenny Albert, Daryl Johnston and Tony Siragusa
- Recap, Gamebook

Game information

**First quarter**

- PHI – Chris Maragos 10-yard blocked punt return, Cody Parkey kick, 14:37 (PHI 7–0)
- PHI – Cody Parkey 26-yard field goal, 7:42 (PHI 10–0)
- PHI – Cody Parkey 27-yard field goal, 3:04 (PHI 13–0)

**Second quarter**

- STL – Brian Quick 8-yard pass from Austin Davis, Greg Zuerlein kick, 3:23 (PHI 13–7)
- PHI – Riley Cooper 9-yard pass from Nick Foles, Cody Parkey kick, 0:30 (PHI 20–7)

**Third quarter**

- PHI – Cedric Thornton defensive fumble recovery in end zone, Cody Parkey kick, 12:17 (PHI 27–7)
- PHI – Jeremy Maclin 24-yard pass from Nick Foles, Cody Parkey kick, 2:15 (PHI 34–7)
- STL – Benny Cunningham 14-yard run, Greg Zuerlein kick, 0:03 (PHI 34–14)

**Fourth quarter**

- STL – Kenny Britt 30-yard pass from Austin Davis, Greg Zuerlein kick, 9:02 (PHI 34–21)
- STL – Brian Quick 5-yard pass from Austin Davis, Greg Zuerlein kick, 4:41 (PHI 34–28)

**Top passers**

- STL – Austin Davis 29/49, 375 Yds, 3 TD
- PHI – Nick Foles 24/37, 207 Yds, 2 TD, INT

**Top rushers**

- STL – Benny Cunningham 7 Att, 47 Yds, TD
- PHI – LeSean McCoy 24 Att, 81 Yds

**Top receivers**

- STL – Brian Quick 5 Rec, 87 Yds, 2 TD
- PHI – Jeremy Maclin 5 Rec, 76 Yds, TD

**Top tacklers**

- STL – T.J. McDonald 10 Tkls
- PHI – DeMeco Ryans 7 Tkls

Following the early bye week, the Rams trailed 34–7 late in the third quarter against the host Eagles, but stormed back with 21 unanswered points. Austin Davis threw for 375 yards and three touchdowns on 29-of-49 passing and led St. Louis to midfield in the final minute, but threw three straight incompletions and the Rams turned the ball over on downs with 37 seconds remaining. Wide receiver Brian Quick caught five passes for 87 yards and two TDs, while safety T.J. McDonald had 10 tackles to lead the St. Louis defense.

==== Week 6: vs. San Francisco 49ers ====
Week Six: San Francisco 49ers at St. Louis Rams – Game summary

| Quarter | 1 | 2 | 3 | 4 | Total |
|---|---|---|---|---|---|
| **49ers** | 0 | 10 | 14 | 7 | **31** |
| Rams | 14 | 0 | 0 | 3 | **17** |

at Edward Jones Dome, St. Louis, Missouri

- Date: October 13
- Game time: 7:30 pm. CDT
- Game weather: Played indoors (dome stadium)
- Game attendance: 56,851
- Referee: Craig Wrolstad
- TV announcers (ESPN): Mike Tirico, Jon Gruden and Lisa Salters
- Recap, Gamebook

Game information

**First quarter**

- STL – Benny Cunningham 1 yard run, Greg Zuerlein, 7:55 (STL 7–0)
- STL – Lance Kendricks 22-yard pass from Austin Davis, Greg Zuerlein kick, 0:53 (STL 14–0)

**Second quarter**

- SF – Phil Dawson 54-yard field goal (STL 14–3)
- SF – Brandon Lloyd 80-yard pass from Colin Kaepernick, Phil Dawson kick, 7:07 (STL 14–10)

**Third quarter**

- SF – Anquan Boldin 11-yard pass from Colin Kaepernick, Phil Dawson kick, 9:58 (SF 17–14)
- SF – Michael Crabtree 32-yard pass from Colin Kaepernick, Phil Dawson kick, 0:13 (SF 24–14)

**Fourth quarter**

- STL – Greg Zuerlein 38-yard field goal, 2:24 (SF 24–17)
- SF – Dontae Johnson 20-yard interception return, Phil Dawson kick, 0:53 (SF 31–17)

**Top passers**

- SF – Colin Kaepernick 22/35, 343 Yds, 3 TD
- STL – Austin Davis 21/42, 236 Yds, TD, INT

**Top rushers**

- SF – Frank Gore 16 Att, 38 Yds
- STL – Tre Mason 5 Att, 40 Yds

**Top receivers**

- SF – Anquan Boldin 7 Rec, 94 Yds, TD
- STL – Jared Cook 4 Rec, 74 Yds

**Top tacklers**

- SF – Ian Williams, 6 Tkls
- STL – T.J. McDonald 7 Tkls, 3 Ast

Hosting the 49ers on Monday Night, the Rams, sporting their 1999 throwbacks, welcomed back "The Greatest Show on Turf" at halftime, and took a 14–0 lead on a 1-yard Benny Cunningham touchdown run and tight end Lance Kendricks catching a 22-yard TD reception from quarterback Austin Davis. But San Francisco ruined the celebration, scoring 24 unanswered points to stun the Rams at home 31–17. Rookie defensive tackle Aaron Donald made his first career start and recorded four tackles in the loss.

==== Week 7: vs. Seattle Seahawks ====
Week Seven: Seattle Seahawks at St. Louis Rams – Game summary

| Quarter | 1 | 2 | 3 | 4 | Total |
|---|---|---|---|---|---|
| Seahawks | 3 | 3 | 7 | 13 | **26** |
| **Rams** | 7 | 14 | 0 | 7 | **28** |

at Edward Jones Dome, St. Louis, Missouri

- Date: October 19
- Game time: 12:00 pm. CDT
- Game weather: Played indoors (dome stadium)
- Game attendance: 57,855
- Referee: Brad Allen
- TV announcers (Fox): Kenny Albert, Daryl Johnston and Tony Siragusa
- Recap, Gamebook

Game information

**First quarter**

- SEA – Steven Hauschka 24-yard field goal, 9:01 (SEA 3–0)
- STL – Tre Mason 6-yard run, Greg Zuerlein kick, 5:19 (STL 7–3)

**Second quarter**

- STL – Benny Cunningham 5-yard pass from Austin Davis, Greg Zuerlein kick, 13:12 (STL 14–3)
- STL – Stedman Bailey 90-yard punt return, Greg Zuerlein kick, 7:05 (STL 21–3)
- SEA – Steven Hauschka 35-yard field goal, 0:07 (STL 21–6)

**Third quarter**

- SEA – Russell Wilson 19-yard run, Steven Hauschka kick, 4:22 (STL 21–13)

**Fourth quarter**

- SEA – Cooper Helfet 19-yard pass from Russell Wilson, pass failed, 9:44 (STL 21–19)
- STL – Lance Kendricks 4-yard pass from Austin Davis, Greg Zuerlein kick, 5:36 (STL 28–19)
- SEA – Doug Baldwin 9-yard pass from Russell Wilson, Steven Hauschka kick, 3:18 (STL 28–26)

**Top passers**

- SEA – Russell Wilson 23/36, 313 Yds, 2 TD
- STL – Austin Davis 17/20, 155 Yds, 2 TD

**Top rushers**

- SEA – Russell Wilson, 7 Att, 106 Yds, TD
- STL – Tre Mason 18 Att, 85 Yds, TD

**Top receivers**

- SEA – Doug Baldwin 7 Rec, 123 Yds, TD
- STL – Benny Cunningham 5 Rec, 46 Yds, TD

**Top tacklers**

- SEA – Malcolm Smith 10 Tkls
- STL – Janoris Jenkins 7 Tkls, 2 Ast

Hoping to rebound from the heartbreaking Monday Night loss at home, the Rams managed to squeeze past the defending Super Bowl champions, 28–26. A pair of special teams plays keyed the victory for St. Louis. Midway through the second quarter, return man Tavon Austin fell down to his left as Seattle defenders converged on him, meanwhile Stedman Bailey actually fielded the punt at the St. Louis 10 then was off for a 90-yard touchdown return down the right sideline by the time the Seahawks realized they had been fooled. Bailey was named NFC Special Teams Player of the Week. Late in the game, the Rams faced fourth-and-3 from their own 18-yard line when punter Johnny Hekker connected with Benny Cunningham for an 18-yard gain and a first down that ultimately helped the Rams to maintain possession and run out the clock.

==== Week 8: at Kansas City Chiefs ====
Week Eight: St. Louis Rams at Kansas City Chiefs – Game summary

| Quarter | 1 | 2 | 3 | 4 | Total |
|---|---|---|---|---|---|
| Rams | 7 | 0 | 0 | 0 | **7** |
| **Chiefs** | 0 | 10 | 10 | 14 | **34** |

at Arrowhead Stadium, Kansas City, Missouri

- Date: October 26
- Game time: 12:00 pm. CDT
- Game weather: 70 °F (21 °C), sunny
- Game attendance: 75,972
- Referee: Jeff Triplette
- TV announcers (Fox): Dick Stockton, Donovan McNabb and Kristina Pink
- Recap, Gamebook

Game information

**First quarter**

- STL – Lance Kendricks 1-yard pass from Austin Davis (Greg Zuerlein kick), 12:02. Rams 7–0. **Drive: 6 plays, 65 yards, 3:04.**

**Second quarter**

- KC – Jamaal Charles 1-yard run (Cairo Santos kick), 12:04. Tied 7–7. **Drive: 10 plays, 53 yards, 5:37.**
- KC – Cairo Santos 53-yard field goal, 0:07. Chiefs 10–7. **Drive: 10 plays, 37 yards, 5:31.**

**Third quarter**

- KC – Knile Davis 99-yard kickoff return (Cairo Santos kick), 15:00. Chiefs 17–7.
- KC – Cairo Santos 28-yard field goal, 8:48. Chiefs 20–7. **Drive: 11 plays, 84 yards, 4:23.**

**Fourth quarter**

- KC – Jamaal Charles 36-yard run (Cairo Santos kick), 14:27. Chiefs 27–7. **Drive: 5 plays, 71 yards, 2:07.**
- KC – Knile Davis 3-yard run (Cairo Santos kick), 6:32. Chiefs 34–7. **Drive: 12 plays, 79 yards, 6:54.**

**Top passers**

- STL – Austin Davis – 15/25, 160 yards, TD, INT
- KC – Alex Smith – 25/29, 223 yards

**Top rushers**

- STL – Tre Mason – 7 rushes, 32 yards
- KC – Jamaal Charles – 14 rushes, 67 yards, 2 TD

**Top receivers**

- STL – Kenny Britt – 2 receptions, 52 yards
- KC – Dwayne Bowe – 6 receptions, 64 yards

**Top tacklers**

- STL – Lamarcus Joyner – 9 tackles, 1 assist
- KC – Justin Houston – 5 tackles (3 sacks)

The Rams travel to Kansas City to face their in-state rival and the first of four AFC West opponents of the season, the Chiefs. Things would get ugly for the Rams as more injuries continue to pile up as both offensive lineman Jake Long and wide receiver Brian Quick suffered season-ending knee and shoulder injuries, respectively. With the loss, the Rams are 0–1 against AFC West opponents.

==== Week 9: at San Francisco 49ers ====
Week Nine: St. Louis Rams at San Francisco 49ers – Game summary

| Quarter | 1 | 2 | 3 | 4 | Total |
|---|---|---|---|---|---|
| **Rams** | 3 | 7 | 0 | 3 | **13** |
| 49ers | 3 | 7 | 0 | 0 | **10** |

at Levi's Stadium, Santa Clara, California

- Date: November 2
- Game time: 3:05 pm. CST/1:05 p.m. PST
- Game weather: 61 °F (16 °C), sunny
- Game attendance: 70,799
- Referee: Jerome Boger
- TV announcers (Fox): Kevin Burkhardt, John Lynch and Pam Oliver
- Recap, Gamebook

Game information

**First quarter**

**Second quarter**

**Third quarter**

**Fourth quarter**

**Top passers**

- STL –
- SF –

**Top rushers**

- STL –
- SF –

**Top receivers**

- STL –
- SF –

**Top tacklers**

- STL –
- SF –

In the last seconds of the fourth quarter, Rams linebacker James Laurinaitis scooped a fumble from 49ers' quarterback Colin Kaepernick, who attempted to dive into the endzone for a game-winning touchdown, to give the Rams a 13–10 victory. The defense, for the most part, sacked Kaepernick eight times.

==== Week 10: at Arizona Cardinals ====
Week Ten: St. Louis Rams at Arizona Cardinals – Game summary

| Quarter | 1 | 2 | 3 | 4 | Total |
|---|---|---|---|---|---|
| Rams | 7 | 7 | 0 | 0 | **14** |
| **Cardinals** | 0 | 10 | 0 | 21 | **31** |

at University of Phoenix Stadium, Glendale, Arizona

- Date: November 9
- Game time: 3:25 pm. CST/2:25 p.m. MST
- Game weather: Played indoors (retractable roof closed)
- Game attendance: 61,363
- Referee: Ron Torbert
- TV announcers (Fox): Chris Myers, Ronde Barber, Matt Hasselbeck and Jennifer Hale
- Recap, Gamebook

Game information

**First quarter**

**Second quarter**

**Third quarter**

**Fourth quarter**

**Top passers**

- STL –
- ARI –

**Top rushers**

- STL –
- ARI –

**Top receivers**

- STL –
- ARI –

**Top tacklers**

- STL –
- ARI –

==== Week 11: vs. Denver Broncos ====
Week Eleven: Denver Broncos at St. Louis Rams – Game summary

| Quarter | 1 | 2 | 3 | 4 | Total |
|---|---|---|---|---|---|
| Broncos | 0 | 7 | 0 | 0 | **7** |
| **Rams** | 10 | 3 | 3 | 6 | **22** |

at Edward Jones Dome, St. Louis, Missouri

- Date: November 16
- Game time: 12:00 pm. CST
- Game weather: Played indoors (dome stadium)
- Game attendance: 59,401
- Referee: Tony Corrente
- TV announcers (CBS): Ian Eagle, Dan Fouts and Jenny Dell
- Recap, Gamebook

Game information

**First quarter**

**Second quarter**

**Third quarter**

**Fourth quarter**

**Top passers**

- DEN –
- STL –

**Top rushers**

- DEN –
- STL –

**Top receivers**

- DEN –
- STL –

**Top tacklers**

- DEN –
- STL –

The Rams meet the Broncos at home for the first time since their home opener in 2006. The Rams won 18–10.

The injury-riddled Denver Broncos (7–2) travel to St. Louis, looking to extend their lead in the AFC West, but it was too late as the Rams defense harassed Peyton Manning and the Broncos offense all day long. Rams' quarterback Shaun Hill returned from injury and took over for Austin Davis, who started only a few games. Among the game's highlights was Rams safety Rodney McLeod taking a hit on Broncos' wide receiver Emmanuel Sanders, forcing Sanders to leave the game with a concussion. Officials later confirmed that the McLeod hit on Sanders was not illegal. Rams kicker Greg Zuerlein converted five field goals (22, 29, 37, 53, 55) and was named NFC Special Teams Player of the Week.

==== Week 12: at San Diego Chargers ====
Week Twelve: St. Louis Rams at San Diego Chargers – Game summary

| Quarter | 1 | 2 | 3 | 4 | Total |
|---|---|---|---|---|---|
| Rams | 3 | 7 | 7 | 7 | **24** |
| **Chargers** | 3 | 3 | 14 | 7 | **27** |

at Qualcomm Stadium, San Diego, California

- Date: November 23
- Game time: 3:05 pm. CST/1:05 pm. PST
- Game weather: 72 °F (22 °C), sunny
- Game attendance: 66,040
- Referee: Carl Cheffers
- TV announcers (Fox): Chris Myers, Ronde Barber and Jennifer Hale
- Recap, Gamebook

Game information

**First quarter**

**Second quarter**

**Third quarter**

**Fourth quarter**

**Top passers**

- STL –
- SD –

**Top rushers**

- STL –
- SD –

**Top receivers**

- STL –
- SD –

**Top tacklers**

- STL –
- SD –

The Rams travel to San Diego, facing their third AFC West opponent, the Chargers. The Rams looked to go 2–1 against AFC West opponents, but couldn't flick the switch this time thanks to the Chargers' Philip Rivers' late game heroics and the San Diego defense, which intercepted a pass from Shaun Hill at the goal line in the game's final minute as he attempted a game-winning touchdown pass. St. Louis cornerback Janoris Jenkins returned an interception 99 yards for a touchdown (tying a team record set by Johnnie Johnson in 1980. Rams fans coming from Southern California showed up in impressive numbers for the game, and many who attended were seen holding up signs involving a possible return to Los Angeles.

==== Week 13: vs. Oakland Raiders ====
Week Thirteen: Oakland Raiders at St. Louis Rams – Game summary

| Quarter | 1 | 2 | 3 | 4 | Total |
|---|---|---|---|---|---|
| Raiders | 0 | 0 | 0 | 0 | **0** |
| **Rams** | 21 | 17 | 0 | 14 | **52** |

at Edward Jones Dome, St. Louis, Missouri

- Date: November 30
- Game time: 12:00 pm. CST
- Game weather: Played indoors (dome stadium)
- Game attendance: 55,650
- Referee: Gene Steratore
- TV announcers (CBS): Andrew Catalon and Steve Beuerlein
- Recap, Gamebook

Game information

**First quarter**

**Second quarter**

**Third quarter**

**Fourth quarter**

**Top passers**

- OAK –
- STL –

**Top rushers**

- OAK –
- STL –

**Top receivers**

- OAK –
- STL –

**Top tacklers**

- OAK –
- STL –

The Rams meet the Raiders at home for the first time in twelve years after Week 6 of 2002, where the Rams defeated the Raiders, who were 4–0 at the time, 28–13 to give the Rams their first victory of 2002 after starting the year with five consecutive losses.

Before the game, five Rams receivers came out of the tunnel with their hands up in protest to support the Ferguson unrest, causing controversy (see hands up don't shoot). Amid the "Hands Up" controversy, the Rams defense obliterated the Raiders and struggling new quarterback Derek Carr all game long. The game was best highlighted by two Tre Mason touchdowns, including an 89-yard run. The Rams held the Raiders scoreless with a 52–0 blowout. With the victory, the Rams finished the year 2–2 against all AFC West opponents.

==== Week 14: at Washington Redskins ====
Week Fourteen: St. Louis Rams at Washington Redskins – Game summary

| Quarter | 1 | 2 | 3 | 4 | Total |
|---|---|---|---|---|---|
| **Rams** | 0 | 6 | 18 | 0 | **24** |
| Redskins | 0 | 0 | 0 | 0 | **0** |

at FedExField, Landover, Maryland

- Date: December 7
- Game time: 1:00 pm. EST/12:00 pm. CST
- Game weather: 45 °F (7 °C), sunny
- Game attendance: 71,120
- Referee: Brad Allen
- TV announcers (Fox): Sam Rosen, Kirk Morrison and Peter Schrager
- Recap, Gamebook

Game information

**First quarter**

**Second quarter**

**Third quarter**

**Fourth quarter**

**Top passers**

- STL –
- WAS –

**Top rushers**

- STL –
- WAS –

**Top receivers**

- STL –
- WAS –

**Top tacklers**

- STL –
- WAS –

Despite Rams' kicker Greg Zuerlein missing a series of field goals and chants of "RG3!!!" from Washington's home crowd, the Rams still managed to hold Washington scoreless, the second game in a row the Rams held an opponent scoreless. During the opening coin toss, the Rams sent out all six players acquired in the Robert Griffin trade in 2012 as their team captains. Quarterback Shaun Hill completed 16 or 22 passes for 213 yards and two touchdowns, both to tight end Jared Cook (four receptions, 61 yards). Tavon Austin ran the ball five times for 46 yards and caught two passes for 14 yards while also returning four punts for 143 yards, including a 78-yard punt return for a touchdown and was named NFC Special Teams Player of the Week.

==== Week 15: vs. Arizona Cardinals ====
Week Fifteen: Arizona Cardinals at St. Louis Rams – Game summary

| Quarter | 1 | 2 | 3 | 4 | Total |
|---|---|---|---|---|---|
| **Cardinals** | 0 | 6 | 3 | 3 | **12** |
| Rams | 3 | 0 | 0 | 3 | **6** |

at Edward Jones Dome, St. Louis, Missouri

- Date: December 11
- Game time: 7:25 pm. CST
- Game weather: Played indoors (dome stadium)
- Game attendance: 55,880
- Referee: Walt Coleman
- TV announcers (NFLN): Jim Nantz, Phil Simms and Tracy Wolfson
- Recap, Gamebook

Game information

**First quarter**

**Second quarter**

**Third quarter**

**Fourth quarter**

**Top passers**

- ARI –
- STL –

**Top rushers**

- ARI –
- STL –

**Top receivers**

- ARI –
- STL –

**Top tacklers**

- ARI –
- STL –

Kicker Greg Zuerlein's two field goals were the only scoring of the game as the Cardinals completed a season sweep of St. Louis. With the loss, the Rams were officially eliminated from playoff contention.

==== Week 16: vs. New York Giants ====
Week Sixteen: New York Giants at St. Louis Rams – Game summary

| Quarter | 1 | 2 | 3 | 4 | Total |
|---|---|---|---|---|---|
| **Giants** | 10 | 10 | 14 | 3 | **37** |
| Rams | 3 | 10 | 7 | 7 | **27** |

at Edward Jones Dome, St. Louis, Missouri

- Date: December 21
- Game time: 3:05 pm. CST
- Game weather: Played indoors (dome stadium)
- Game attendance: 55,851
- Referee: Pete Morelli
- TV announcers (Fox): Thom Brennaman, David Diehl and Laura Okmin
- Recap, Gamebook

Game information

**First quarter**

**Second quarter**

**Third quarter**

**Fourth quarter**

**Top passers**

- NYG –
- STL –

**Top rushers**

- NYG –
- STL –

**Top receivers**

- NYG –
- STL –

**Top tacklers**

- NYG –
- STL –

The Rams wrapped up their 2014 home schedule, facing their fourth and final NFC East opponent, the Giants, led by new wide receiver Odell Beckham Jr. Tempers flared later in the game as a sideline brawl escalated after a late hit on Beckham, drawing 3 ejections to Giants' Damontre Moore and Preston Parker and Rams' defensive end William Hayes. The Rams went on to lose their final home game, 27–37.

==== Week 17: at Seattle Seahawks ====
Week Seventeen: St. Louis Rams at Seattle Seahawks – Game summary

| Quarter | 1 | 2 | 3 | 4 | Total |
|---|---|---|---|---|---|
| Rams | 3 | 3 | 0 | 0 | **6** |
| **Seahawks** | 0 | 0 | 6 | 14 | **20** |

at CenturyLink Field, Seattle, Washington

- Date: December 28
- Game time: 3:25 pm. CST/1:25 pm. PST
- Game weather: 43 °F (6 °C), cloudy
- Game attendance: 68,453
- Referee: Ron Torbert
- TV announcers (Fox): Gus Johnson, Charles Davis and Molly McGrath
- Recap, Gamebook

Game information

**First quarter**

**Second quarter**

**Third quarter**

**Fourth quarter**

**Top passers**

- STL –
- SEA –

**Top rushers**

- STL –
- SEA –

**Top receivers**

- STL –
- SEA –

**Top tacklers**

- STL –
- SEA –

Going to Seattle for their third straight year, the Rams once again struggled all game, losing the game 20–6, ending their season with a disappointing 6–10 record. The record led the team to draft running back Todd Gurley from Georgia with the 10th pick in the first round of the 2015 NFL draft.

== Standings ==
=== Division ===
NFC West
| | W | L | T | PCT | DIV | CONF | PF | PA | STK |
|---|---|---|---|---|---|---|---|---|---|
| ^{(1)} Seattle Seahawks | 12 | 4 | 0 | .750 | 5–1 | 10–2 | 394 | 254 | W6 |
| ^{(5)} Arizona Cardinals | 11 | 5 | 0 | .688 | 3–3 | 8–4 | 310 | 299 | L2 |
| San Francisco 49ers | 8 | 8 | 0 | .500 | 2–4 | 7–5 | 306 | 340 | W1 |
| St. Louis Rams | 6 | 10 | 0 | .375 | 2–4 | 4–8 | 324 | 354 | L3 |

=== Conference ===
NFC
| # | Team | Division | W | L | T | PCT | DIV | CONF | SOS | SOV | STK |
|---|---|---|---|---|---|---|---|---|---|---|---|
Division leaders
| 1 (Note: Seattle, Green Bay and Dallas were ranked in seeds 1–3 based on conference record.) | Seattle Seahawks | West | 12 | 4 | 0 | .750 | 5–1 | 10–2 | .525 | .513 | W6 |
| 2 | Green Bay Packers | North | 12 | 4 | 0 | .750 | 5–1 | 9–3 | .482 | .440 | W2 |
| 3 | Dallas Cowboys | East | 12 | 4 | 0 | .750 | 4–2 | 8–4 | .445 | .422 | W4 |
| 4 | Carolina Panthers | South | 7 | 8 | 1 | .469 | 4–2 | 6–6 | .490 | .357 | W4 |
Wild Cards
| 5 (Note: Arizona defeated Detroit head-to-head (Week 11, 14–6).) | Arizona Cardinals | West | 11 | 5 | 0 | .688 | 3–3 | 8–4 | .523 | .477 | L2 |
| 6 | Detroit Lions | North | 11 | 5 | 0 | .688 | 5–1 | 9–3 | .471 | .392 | L1 |
Did not qualify for the postseason
| 7 | Philadelphia Eagles | East | 10 | 6 | 0 | .625 | 4–2 | 6–6 | .490 | .416 | W1 |
| 8 | San Francisco 49ers | West | 8 | 8 | 0 | .500 | 2–4 | 7–5 | .527 | .508 | W1 |
| 9 (Note: New Orleans defeated Minnesota head-to-head (Week 3, 20–9).) | New Orleans Saints | South | 7 | 9 | 0 | .438 | 3–3 | 6–6 | .486 | .415 | W1 |
| 10 | Minnesota Vikings | North | 7 | 9 | 0 | .438 | 1–5 | 6–6 | .475 | .308 | W1 |
| 11 (Note: The NY Giants defeated both Atlanta and St. Louis head-to-head (Atlanta: Week 5, 30–20; St. Louis: Week 16, 37–27), while Atlanta finished ahead of St. Louis based on conference record.) | New York Giants | East | 6 | 10 | 0 | .375 | 2–4 | 4–8 | .512 | .323 | L1 |
| 12 | Atlanta Falcons | South | 6 | 10 | 0 | .375 | 5–1 | 6–6 | .482 | .380 | L1 |
| 13 | St. Louis Rams | West | 6 | 10 | 0 | .375 | 2–4 | 4–8 | .531 | .427 | L3 |
| 14 | Chicago Bears | North | 5 | 11 | 0 | .313 | 1–5 | 4–8 | .529 | .338 | L5 |
| 15 | Washington Redskins | East | 4 | 12 | 0 | .250 | 2–4 | 2–10 | .496 | .422 | L1 |
| 16 | Tampa Bay Buccaneers | South | 2 | 14 | 0 | .125 | 0–6 | 1–11 | .486 | .469 | L6 |
Tiebreakers (Note: When breaking ties for three or more teams under the NFL's rules, they are first broken within divisions, then comparing only the highest-ranked remaining team from each division.)

== Awards and honors ==
| Recipient | awards |
|---|---|
| Stedman Bailey | Week 7: NFC Special Teams Player of the Week |
| Greg Zuerlein | Week 11: NFC Special Teams Player of the Week |
| Tavon Austin | Week 14: NFC Special Teams Player of the Week |
| Aaron Donald | NFL Defensive Rookie of the Year, PFWA All-Rookie Team |
| Tre Mason | PFWA All-Rookie Team |
| E.J. Gaines | PFWA All-Rookie Team |
