= 2015 St. Louis Rams season =

79th season in franchise history, final one in St. Louis

- Owner: Stan Kroenke
- General manager: Les Snead
- Head coach: Jeff Fisher
- Home stadium: Edward Jones Dome

Results
- Record: 7–9
- Division place: 3rd NFC West
- Playoffs: Did not qualify
- Pro Bowlers: Aaron Donald, DT; Todd Gurley, RB; Johnny Hekker, P

Uniform
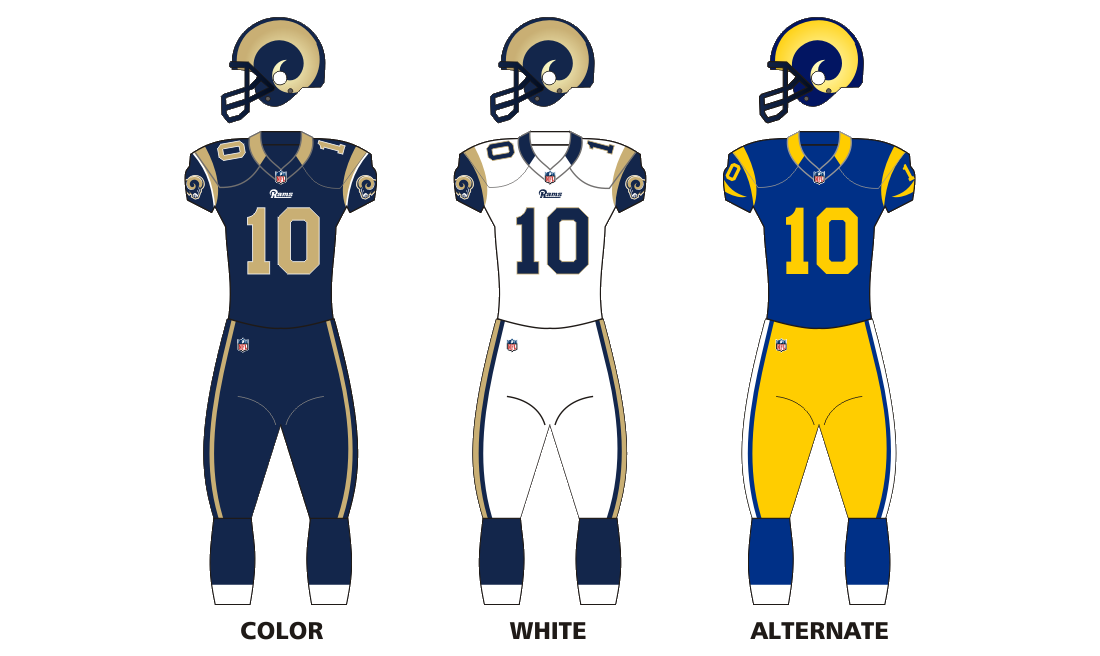

The 2015 season was the St. Louis Rams' 78th in the National Football League (NFL), their fourth under head coach Jeff Fisher, and their 21st and final season in St. Louis, Missouri, their home since the 1995 season.

The Rams improved on their 6–10 record from 2014 by going 7–9 for the 2015 season, but tied a franchise record set between 1956 and 1966 by missing the playoffs for the eleventh consecutive season.

After the season, an arbitral tribunal gave permission for the Rams to void their lease on the Edward Jones Dome. Rams owner Stan Kroenke filed a formal application with the league to relocate the Rams to their long-time home of Los Angeles, California, where the team would play at the Los Angeles Memorial Coliseum for four seasons until their stadium in Inglewood, California was complete. They were originally slated to play at the Coliseum for only three seasons; delays in the construction of the new stadium resulted in the added season at the historic venue. Kroenke's request to move the team to Los Angeles was approved on January 12, 2016, at a meeting in Houston, Texas.

The Rams' starting quarterbacks during the season, Nick Foles and Case Keenum, started against each other at quarterback in the 2017 NFC Championship Game, for the Philadelphia Eagles and Minnesota Vikings, respectively. The Eagles won that meeting and Super Bowl LII, with Foles being named Super Bowl MVP.

== 2015 draft class ==
2015 St. Louis Rams draft
| Round | Selection | Player | Position | College |
|---|---|---|---|---|
| 1 | 10 | Todd Gurley | RB | Georgia |
| 2 | 57 | Rob Havenstein | OT | Wisconsin |
| 3 | 72 | Jamon Brown | OT | Louisville |
| 3 | 89 | Sean Mannion | QB | Oregon State |
| 4 | 119 | Andrew Donnal | OT | Iowa |
| 6 | 201 | Bud Sasser | WR | Missouri |
| 6 | 215 | Cody Wichmann | OG | Fresno State |
| 7 | 224 | Bryce Hager | ILB | Baylor |
| 7 | 227 | Martin Ifedi | DE | Memphis |

| Compensatory selection |

Draft trades

- The Rams traded their original fourth- and sixth-round selections (Nos. 109 and 184 overall, respectively) to the Tampa Bay Buccaneers in exchange for safety Mark Barron.
- The Rams traded quarterback Sam Bradford and their fifth-round selection (No. 145 overall) to the Philadelphia Eagles in exchange for quarterback Nick Foles, the Eagles' fourth-round selection (No. 119 overall) and the Eagles' second round selection in 2016. The trade also includes a conditional selection in 2016 that the Eagles could receive depending on Bradford's playing time in 2015. The Eagles will receive a 2016 fourth-round selection if Bradford plays fewer than 50 percent of the snaps; the selection will upgrade to a third-rounder if Bradford does not play at all in 2015. Bradford started for the Eagles Week 1, eliminating the possibility of the third-round upgrade.
- The Rams traded one of their two seventh-round selections (No. 249 overall – acquired in a trade that sent wide receiver Greg Salas to the New England Patriots), along with their 2013 second-round selection to the Atlanta Falcons in exchange for the Falcons' 2013 first-, third- and sixth-round selections.
- The Rams traded their second round selection (No. 41 overall) to the Carolina Panthers (used to select Devin Funchess, WR, Michigan) for Carolina's second round selection (No. 57 overall, used to select Rob Havenstein), third round selection (No. 89 overall, used to select Sean Mannion) and sixth round selection (No. 201 overall, used to select Bud Sasser).
- The Rams traded RB Zac Stacy to the New York Jets for their seventh round selection (No. 224 overall, used to select Bryce Hager).

Supplemental draft

- The Rams selected Clemson offensive tackle Isaiah Battle in the 2015 Supplemental draft. As a result, the team will forfeit their fifth-round selection in the 2016 draft.

== Staff ==
2015 St. Louis Rams staff
| Front office: Owner/chairman – Stan Kroenke; Owner/vice chairman – Chip Rosenbloom; Executive vice president of football operations/coo – Kevin Demoff; General manager – Les Snead; Director of college scouting – Brad Holmes; Director of player personnel – Taylor Morton; Director of pro personnel – Ran Carthon; Head coaches: Executive vice president/head coach – Jeff Fisher; Assistant head coach – Dave McGinnis, Rob Boras; Offensive coaches: Offensive coordinator – Rob Boras; Quarterbacks – Chris Weinke; Running backs – Ben Sirmans; Wide receivers – Ray Sherman; Tight ends – Kenan Smith; Offensive line – Paul Boudreau; Assistant offensive line – Andy Dickerson; Offensive quality control – Andy Sugarman | Defensive coaches: Defensive coordinator – Gregg Williams; Defensive line – Mike Waufle; Assistant defensive line – Clyde Simmons; Linebackers – Frank Bush; Assistant linebackers – Joe Bowden; Secondary – Chuck Cecil; Assistant secondary – Brandon Fisher; Defensive quality control – Dennard Wilson; Special teams coaches: Special teams coordinator – John Fassel; Assistant special teams coordinator – Paul F. Boudreau; Strength and conditioning: Head strength and conditioning – Rock Gullickson; Assistant strength and conditioning – Adam Bailey; Assistant strength and conditioning – J. Aggabao |

== Final roster ==
2015 St. Louis Rams roster
| Quarterbacks (QB): 5 Nick Foles; 17 Case Keenum; 14 Sean Mannion; Running backs (RB): 39 Malcolm Brown; 36 Benny Cunningham; 30 Todd Gurley; 27 Tre Mason; 34 Chase Reynolds; Wide receivers (WR): 11 Tavon Austin; 18 Kenny Britt; 15 Bradley Marquez; 83 Brian Quick; 81 Nick Toon; 19 Wes Welker; Tight ends (TE): 89 Jared Cook; 46 Cory Harkey; 88 Lance Kendricks | Offensive linemen (OL): 61 Tim Barnes C; 77 Isaiah Battle T; 64 Andrew Donnal T; 67 Brian Folkerts C; 79 Rob Havenstein T; 60 Eric Kush C; 71 Garrett Reynolds G/T; 65 Demetrius Rhaney G; 73 Greg Robinson T; 69 Cody Wichmann G; Defensive linemen (DL): 90 Michael Brockers DT; 99 Aaron Donald DT; 95 William Hayes DE; 91 Chris Long DE; 63 Matt Longacre DE; 97 Eugene Sims DE; 62 Louis Trinca-Pasat DT; 93 Ethan Westbrooks DE | Linebackers (LB): 56 Akeem Ayers OLB; 26 Mark Barron OLB; 53 Daren Bates OLB; 54 Bryce Hager MLB; 55 James Laurinaitis MLB; 50 Cameron Lynch OLB; Defensive backs (DB): 31 Maurice Alexander SS; 37 Christian Bryant SS; 38 Cody Davis FS; 32 Troy Hill CB; 21 Janoris Jenkins CB; 22 Trumaine Johnson CB; 20 Lamarcus Joyner CB; 23 Rodney McLeod FS; 47 Marcus Roberson CB; Special teams (ST): 6 Johnny Hekker P; 44 Jake McQuaide LS; 4 Greg Zuerlein K | Practice squad: 66 David Arkin G; 48 Justice Cunningham TE; 57 Zack Hodges OLB; 45 Zach Laskey FB; 87 Deon Long WR; 51 Matthew Wells OLB; 35 Melvin White CB; 16 J.J. Worton WR; Reserve: 12 Stedman Bailey WR (NF-Inj.); 68 Jamon Brown G (IR); 98 Nick Fairley DT (IR); 2 Isiah Ferguson WR (IR); 33 E. J. Gaines CB (IR); 25 T. J. McDonald SS (IR); 52 Alec Ogletree OLB (IR/DFR); 24 Eric Patterson CB (IR); 94 Robert Quinn DE (IR); 76 Rodger Saffold G (IR); 42 Trey Watts RB (Susp.); 63 Darrell Williams T (IR); 92 Doug Worthington DT (IR); Rookies in italics 53 active, 13 reserve, 8 practice squad |

== Schedule ==
=== Preseason ===
| Week | Date | Opponent | Result | Record | Venue | Recap |
|---|---|---|---|---|---|---|
| 1 | August 14 | at Oakland Raiders | **L** 3–18 | 0–1 | O.co Coliseum | Recap |
| 2 | August 23 | at Tennessee Titans | **L** 14–27 | 0–2 | Nissan Stadium | Recap |
| 3 | August 29 | Indianapolis Colts | **L** 14–24 | 0–3 | Edward Jones Dome | Recap |
| 4 | September 3 | Kansas City Chiefs | **L** 17–24 | 0–4 | Edward Jones Dome | Recap |

=== Regular season ===
| Week | Date | Opponent | Result | Record | Venue | Recap |
|---|---|---|---|---|---|---|
| 1 | September 13 | **Seattle Seahawks** | **W** 34–31 (OT) | 1–0 | Edward Jones Dome | Recap |
| 2 | September 20 | at Washington Redskins | **L** 10–24 | 1–1 | FedExField | Recap |
| 3 | September 27 | Pittsburgh Steelers | **L** 6–12 | 1–2 | Edward Jones Dome | Recap |
| 4 | October 4 | at **Arizona Cardinals** | **W** 24–22 | 2–2 | University of Phoenix Stadium | Recap |
| 5 | October 11 | at Green Bay Packers | **L** 10–24 | 2–3 | Lambeau Field | Recap |
| 6 | Bye | | | | | |
| 7 | October 25 | Cleveland Browns | **W** 24–6 | 3–3 | Edward Jones Dome | Recap |
| 8 | November 1 | **San Francisco 49ers** | **W** 27–6 | 4–3 | Edward Jones Dome | Recap |
| 9 | November 8 | at Minnesota Vikings | **L** 18–21 (OT) | 4–4 | TCF Bank Stadium | Recap |
| 10 | November 15 | Chicago Bears | **L** 13–37 | 4–5 | Edward Jones Dome | Recap |
| 11 | November 22 | at Baltimore Ravens | **L** 13–16 | 4–6 | M&T Bank Stadium | Recap |
| 12 | November 29 | at Cincinnati Bengals | **L** 7–31 | 4–7 | Paul Brown Stadium | Recap |
| 13 | December 6 | **Arizona Cardinals** | **L** 3–27 | 4–8 | Edward Jones Dome | Recap |
| 14 | December 13 | Detroit Lions | **W** 21–14 | 5–8 | Edward Jones Dome | Recap |
| 15 | December 17 | Tampa Bay Buccaneers | **W** 31–23 | 6–8 | Edward Jones Dome | Recap |
| 16 | December 27 | at **Seattle Seahawks** | **W** 23–17 | 7–8 | CenturyLink Field | Recap |
| 17 | January 3 | at **San Francisco 49ers** | **L** 16–19 (OT) | 7–9 | Levi's Stadium | Recap |

Note: Intra-division opponents are in bold text.

=== Game summaries ===
==== Week 1: vs. Seattle Seahawks ====
Week One: Seattle Seahawks at St. Louis Rams – Game summary

| Quarter | 1 | 2 | 3 | 4 | OT | Total |
|---|---|---|---|---|---|---|
| Seahawks | 7 | 3 | 3 | 18 | 0 | **31** |
| **Rams** | 0 | 10 | 14 | 7 | 3 | **34** |

at Edward Jones Dome, St. Louis, Missouri

- Date: September 13
- Game time: 12:00 p.m. CDT
- Game weather: Played indoors (dome stadium)
- Game attendance: 51,792
- Referee: Jeff Triplette
- TV announcers (Fox): Kenny Albert, Daryl Johnston and Laura Okmin
- Recap, Gamebook

Game information

**First quarter** **Second quarter** **Third quarter** **Fourth quarter**

**Top passers**

- SEA – Russell Wilson 32-41, 251 yds, TD, INT
- STL – Nick Foles 18-27, 297 yds, TD

**Top rushers**

- SEA – Marshawn Lynch 18 car, 73 yds
- STL – Benny Cunningham 16 car, 45 yds

**Top receivers**

- SEA – Jermaine Kearse 8 rec, 76 yds
- STL – Jared Cook 5 rec, 85 yds

**Top tacklers**

- SEA – Earl Thomas 6 tackles, 3 assists
- STL – Lamarcus Joyner 7 tackles, 0 assists

In his debut as the Rams' starting quarterback, Nick Foles threw for 297 yards and a touchdown, and the Rams upset the Seahawks in their season opener at home. Running back Benny Cunningham got the start and totaled 46 yards rushing and 77 yards receiving while Tavon Austin ran for a 16-yard TD and then scored on a 75-yard punt return in the third quarter as St. Louis built a 24-13 lead. But Seattle rallied for 18 unanswered points to take a 31-24 lead before the Rams came back as Foles hit tight end Lance Kendricks for a 37-yard score with 53 seconds left. Kicker Greg Zuerlein converted the point-after attempt and then made a 37-yard field goal in overtime to put the Rams ahead. The defense sacked Seattle quarterback Russell Wilson six times and limited running back Marshawn Lynch to just 73 rushing yards. The Seahawks drove into Rams territory on their overtime possession but on fourth-and-1 at the St. Louis 42, Lynch was stuffed by defensive tackles Michael Brockers and Aaron Donald to preserve the victory. Donald had nine total tackles (five solo, four assists) including two sacks and three tackles for loss and was named NFC Defensive Player of the Week for the first time in his career.

==== Week 2: at Washington Redskins ====
Week Two: St. Louis Rams at Washington Redskins – Game summary

| Quarter | 1 | 2 | 3 | 4 | Total |
|---|---|---|---|---|---|
| Rams | 0 | 0 | 10 | 0 | **10** |
| **Redskins** | 10 | 7 | 0 | 7 | **24** |

at FedExField, Landover, Maryland

- Date: September 20
- Game time: 1:00 p.m. EDT/12:00 pm. CDT
- Game weather: 72 °F (22 °C), cloudy
- Game attendance: 74,486
- Referee: Ed Hochuli
- TV announcers (Fox): Dick Stockton, David Diehl and Kristina Pink
- Preview, Gamebook

Game information

**First quarter** **Second quarter** **Third quarter** **Fourth quarter**

**Top passers**

- STL - Nick Foles 17-32, 150 yds, TD
- WAS – Kirk Cousins 23-27, 203 yds, TD

**Top rushers**

- STL – Tavon Austin 4 car, 40 yds
- WAS – Matt Jones

**Top receivers**

- STL – Jared Cook 5 rec, 47 yds
- WAS – Jordan Reed 6 rec, 82 yds

**Top tacklers**

- STL –
- WAS –

After falling behind 17-0 in the first half at Washington, the Rams came back on a 52-yard field goal by Greg Zuerlein and a 40-yard TD pass from Nick Foles to wide receiver Kenny Britt to close within 17-10 in the third quarter. But Redskins running back Matt Jones (16 carries, 123 yards) scored his second touchdown of the game with 2:38 remaining to seal the win for Washington.

==== Week 3: vs. Pittsburgh Steelers ====
Week Three: Pittsburgh Steelers at St. Louis Rams – Game summary

| Quarter | 1 | 2 | 3 | 4 | Total |
|---|---|---|---|---|---|
| **Steelers** | 3 | 6 | 0 | 3 | **12** |
| Rams | 0 | 3 | 0 | 3 | **6** |

at Edward Jones Dome, St. Louis, Missouri

- Date: September 27
- Game time: 12:00 pm. CDT
- Game weather: Played indoors (dome stadium)
- Game attendance: 52,433
- Referee: John Hussey
- TV announcers (CBS): Greg Gumbel, Trent Green and Jamie Erdahl
- Recap, Gamebook

Game information

**First quarter**

**Second quarter**

**Third quarter**

**Fourth quarter**

**Top passers**

- PIT –
- STL –

**Top rushers**

- PIT –
- STL –

**Top receivers**

- PIT –
- STL –

**Top tacklers**

- PIT –
- STL –

The Rams struggled offensively and defensively all game long. The defense sacked Pittsburgh quarterback three times as Ben Roethlisberger was forced from the game with an apparent knee injury. He was then replaced by Michael Vick, who was sacked twice himself by the Rams. Quarterback Nick Foles (19-28-197 yards, 0 TDs, 1 INT) struggled on offense while the Rams running game was limited to just 71 yards. Rookie running back Todd Gurley, the team's No. 1 draft pick, made his professional football debut and had six carries for nine yards and one carry for five yards. Prior to kickoff, the game was delayed due to the turf being caught on fire due to a fireworks display gone awry.

==== Week 4: at Arizona Cardinals ====
Week Four: St. Louis Rams at Arizona Cardinals – Game summary

| Quarter | 1 | 2 | 3 | 4 | Total |
|---|---|---|---|---|---|
| **Rams** | 7 | 3 | 7 | 7 | **24** |
| Cardinals | 3 | 6 | 3 | 10 | **22** |

at University of Phoenix Stadium, Glendale, Arizona

- Date: October 4
- Game time: 3:25 pm. CDT/1:25 pm. Arizona time
- Game weather: Played indoors (retractable roof closed)
- Game attendance: 63,146
- Referee: John Parry
- TV announcers (Fox): Thom Brennaman, Charles Davis and Tony Siragusa
- Recap, Gamebook

Game information

**First quarter**

**Second quarter**

**Third quarter**

**Fourth quarter**

**Top passers**

- STL –
- ARI –

**Top rushers**

- STL –
- ARI –

**Top receivers**

- STL –
- ARI –

**Top tacklers**

- STL –
- ARI –

The Rams traveled to Phoenix and improved their record to 2-2 in an upset of the red-hot Cardinals, the 2nd highest-scoring team in the league. Nick Foles passed for 171 yards and three touchdowns, two of which went to wide receiver Tavon Austin (six receptions, 96 yards). Todd Gurley got his first start as Rams' running back, and after being limited to four carries for 2 yards in the first half, he finished the game with 146 rushing yards. Gurley contributed big runs that led to TDs scored by wide receiver Stedman Bailey and Austin. With the Rams clinging to a two-point lead and facing a third down-and-12 situation with just over a minute remaining, Gurley broke loose for a 30-yard gain down the left sideline and appeared headed for the end zone before voluntarily going down at the Arizona 8 to allow the Rams to run out the clock. After the game, Bruce Arians commented that Gurley, "played like a rookie." The Rams defense limited the Cardinals to five field goals and held them out of the end zone until late in the fourth quarter, and sacked Arizona quarterback Carson Palmer four times. It would be the first of nine straight victories for the Rams franchise in Arizona.

==== Week 5: at Green Bay Packers ====
Week Five: St. Louis Rams at Green Bay Packers – Game summary

| Quarter | 1 | 2 | 3 | 4 | Total |
|---|---|---|---|---|---|
| Rams | 0 | 10 | 0 | 0 | **10** |
| **Packers** | 14 | 0 | 7 | 3 | **24** |

at Lambeau Field, Green Bay, Wisconsin

- Date: October 11
- Game time: 12:00 pm. CDT
- Game weather: 67 °F (19 °C), clear
- Game attendance: 78,432
- Referee: Brad Allen
- TV announcers (CBS): Ian Eagle, Dan Fouts and Evan Washburn
- Recap, Gamebook

Game information

**First quarter**

**Second quarter**

**Third quarter**

**Fourth quarter**

**Top passers**

- STL –
- GB –

**Top rushers**

- STL –
- GB –

**Top receivers**

- STL –
- GB –

**Top tacklers**

- STL –
- GB –

Traveling to Green Bay, the Rams looked to end the Packers' hot streak at 4-1 but failed as Nick Foles completed only 11 passes in 30 attempts, was intercepted four times and sacked three times. Running back Todd Gurley totaled a season-high 159 yards on 30 attempts but was held out of the end zone. On defense, St. Louis James Laurinitis intercepted a pass from Aaron Rodgers, the Green Bay QB's first interception thrown at Lambeau Field in 20 games. Rams cornerback Trumaine Johnson added another interception later in the game. However, the defense struggled to contain the Packers explosive receiving corps all day long. With the loss, the Rams dropped to 2-3.

==== Week 7: vs. Cleveland Browns ====
Week Seven: Cleveland Browns at St. Louis Rams – Game summary

| Quarter | 1 | 2 | 3 | 4 | Total |
|---|---|---|---|---|---|
| Browns | 0 | 3 | 3 | 0 | **6** |
| **Rams** | 10 | 0 | 7 | 7 | **24** |

at Edward Jones Dome, St. Louis, Missouri

- Date: October 25
- Game time: 12:00 pm. CDT
- Game weather: Played indoors (dome stadium)
- Game attendance: 51,523
- Referee: Pete Morelli
- TV announcers (CBS): Brian Anderson and Chris Simms
- Recap, Gamebook

Game information

**First quarter**

- STL – Rodney McLeod 20-yard fumble return (Greg Zuerlein kick), 12:06. Rams 7–0.
- STL – Greg Zuerlein 39-yard field goal, 7:40. Rams 10–0. **Drive: 4 plays, 4 yards, 1:42.**

**Second quarter**

- CLE – Travis Coons 25-yard field goal, 14:07. Rams 10–3. **Drive: 14 plays, 73 yards, 8:28.**

**Third quarter**

- CLE – Travis Coons 44-yard field goal, 11:53. Rams 10–6. **Drive: 6 plays, 54 yards, 3:15.**
- STL – Todd Gurley 1-yard run (Greg Zuerlein kick), 2:20. Rams 17–6. **Drive: 4 plays, 88 yards, 1:55.**

**Fourth quarter**

- STL – Todd Gurley 16-yard run (Greg Zuerlein kick), 8:18. Rams 24–6. **Drive: 7 plays, 56 yards, 4:06.**

**Top passers**

- CLE – Josh McCown – 26/32, 270 yards
- STL – Nick Foles – 15/23, 163 yards

**Top rushers**

- CLE – Robert Turbin – 5 rushes, 30 yards
- STL – Todd Gurley – 19 rushes, 128 yards, 2 TD

**Top receivers**

- CLE – Gary Barnidge – 6 receptions, 101 yards
- STL – Tavon Austin – 4 receptions, 43 yards

**Top tacklers**

- CLE – Jordan Poyer – 5 tackles, 5 assists
- STL – Mark Barron – 10 tackles, 6 assists

For the first time since Week 8 of 2007, the Rams hosted the Cleveland Browns in St. Louis. In the first quarter, Rodney McLeod returned a fumble to the end zone to give the Rams the game's first points, and kicker Greg Zuelein added a 39-yard field goal. Running back Todd Gurley was limited to just 45 yards in the first half, but he managed to turn things around in the second half, rushing for 83 yards scoring his first NFL touchdown on a 1-yard run in the third quarter (he later added a second TD on a 6-yard run in the fourth period). The Rams defense combined for four forced fumbles recovered as well as four sacks of Browns quarterback Josh McCown. With the win, the Rams went to 3-3.

==== Week 8: vs. San Francisco 49ers ====
Week Eight: San Francisco 49ers at St. Louis Rams – Game summary

| Quarter | 1 | 2 | 3 | 4 | Total |
|---|---|---|---|---|---|
| 49ers | 3 | 3 | 0 | 0 | **6** |
| **Rams** | 2 | 18 | 0 | 7 | **27** |

at Edward Jones Dome, St. Louis, Missouri

- Date: November 1
- Game time: 12:00 pm. CST
- Game weather: Played indoors (domed stadium)
- Game attendance: 51,207
- Referee: Jerome Boger
- TV announcers (Fox): Dick Stockton, David Diehl and Kristina Pink
- Recap, Gamebook

Game information

**First quarter**

**Second quarter**

**Third quarter**

**Fourth quarter**

**Top passers**

- SF –
- STL –

**Top rushers**

- SF –
- STL –

**Top receivers**

- SF –
- STL –

**Top tacklers**

- SF –
- STL –

Todd Gurley had another productive day, rushing for 133 yards on 20 carries, including a 71-yard run for a touchdown in the second quarter. Rams wide receiver Tavon Austin had 119 total yards on just seven touches, including a 2-yard TD run in the second quarter and catching a 66-yard scoring pass from quarterback Nick Foles in the fourth. touchdowns for the final score. Rams linebacker James Laurinaitis tackled 49ers running back Mike Davis for a safety in the first period and the defense had three sacks and nine hits of San Francisco quarterback Colin Kaepernick during the game. With the win, the Rams improved to 4-3, making it the first time since 2012 the Rams were above .500 excluding a Week 1 victory. The Rams also wore their 1973-1999 throwbacks for the first time in the season.

==== Week 9: at Minnesota Vikings ====
Week Nine: St. Louis Rams at Minnesota Vikings – Game summary

| Quarter | 1 | 2 | 3 | 4 | OT | Total |
|---|---|---|---|---|---|---|
| Rams | 6 | 9 | 0 | 3 | 0 | **18** |
| **Vikings** | 10 | 0 | 8 | 0 | 3 | **21** |

at TCF Bank Stadium, Minneapolis, Minnesota

- Date: November 8
- Game time: 12:00 pm. CST
- Game weather: 51 °F (11 °C), sunny
- Game attendance: 52,406
- Referee: Ron Torbert
- TV announcers (Fox): Thom Brennaman, Charles Davis and Tony Siragusa
- Recap, Gamebook

Game information

**First quarter**

**Second quarter**

**Third quarter**

**Fourth quarter**

**Top passers**

- STL –
- MIN –

**Top rushers**

- STL –
- MIN –

**Top receivers**

- STL –
- MIN –

**Top tacklers**

- STL –
- MIN –

In a duel of running backs between Todd Gurley and Adrian Peterson, Gurley was held to just 89 yards and Peterson (125 yards) led host Minnesota to the victory. Without several defensive starters including Robert Quinn, the Rams defense struggled to contain the Vikings offense, especially their explosive receiving corps, all game long. In the second quarter, Greg Zuerlein gave the Rams a 12-10 lead with a 61-yard field goal, the longest field goal in Rams franchise history. The field goal put Zuerlein 7th in NFL history for longest field goal made, and as the only kicker in NFL history besides Sebastian Janikowski to have more than one field goal of 60 yards or longer in his career. In the second half, Rams safety Lamarcus Joyner hit Teddy Bridgewater in the head, forcing the Minnesota QB to leave the game with a concussion. Commentator Thom Brennaman called the hit on Bridgewater "dirty". Shaun Hill, who played for the Rams last year and returned to Minnesota for his second stint in the off-season, took over for Bridgewater. With the Rams trailing 18-15 in the fourth quarter, Zuerlein booted his fourth field goal in five attempts, forcing the game into overtime. However, in that period, Minnesota's Blair Walsh nailed the game-winning field goal to give the Vikings the final score. With the narrow loss, the Rams dropped to 4-4.

==== Week 10: vs. Chicago Bears ====
Week Ten: Chicago Bears at St. Louis Rams – Game summary

| Quarter | 1 | 2 | 3 | 4 | Total |
|---|---|---|---|---|---|
| **Bears** | 10 | 14 | 0 | 13 | **37** |
| Rams | 10 | 0 | 3 | 0 | **13** |

at Edward Jones Dome, St. Louis, Missouri

- Date: November 15
- Game time: 12:00 pm. CST
- Game weather: Played indoors (dome stadium)
- Game attendance: 58,653
- Referee: Jeff Triplette
- TV announcers (CBS): Andrew Catalon, Steve Beuerlein and Steve Tasker
- Recap, Gamebook

Game information

**First quarter**

**Second quarter**

**Third quarter**

**Fourth quarter**

**Top passers**

- CHI –
- STL –

**Top rushers**

- CHI –
- STL –

**Top receivers**

- CHI –
- STL –

**Top tacklers**

- CHI –
- STL –

The Rams struggled all game especially on defense in which they could not contain the Bears offense, especially the running game despite an injury to Matt Forte. St. Louis quarterback Nick Foles (17-36-200 yards, 1 INT) struggled all day and this time it would force Case Keenum to take over late in the fourth quarter. Running back Todd Gurley was held to 89 total yards. Prior to Week 10, wide receiver Stedman Bailey was suspended for four games for violating the league's substance abuse policy. Later, the Rams acquired free agent Wes Welker, who had previously starred for the Denver Broncos and New England Patriots. Welker caught three passes for 32 yards in his St. Louis debut. With the loss, the Rams dropped to 4-5.

==== Week 11: at Baltimore Ravens ====
Week Eleven: St. Louis Rams at Baltimore Ravens – Game summary

| Quarter | 1 | 2 | 3 | 4 | Total |
|---|---|---|---|---|---|
| Rams | 7 | 0 | 6 | 0 | **13** |
| **Ravens** | 0 | 3 | 0 | 13 | **16** |

at M&T Bank Stadium, Baltimore, Maryland

- Date: November 22
- Game time: 1:00 pm. EST/12:00 pm. CST
- Game weather: 47 °F (8 °C), partly cloudy
- Game attendance: 71,105
- Referee: Tony Corrente
- TV announcers (Fox): Kenny Albert, Daryl Johnston and Laura Okmin
- Recap, Gamebook

Game information

**First quarter**

**Second quarter**

**Third quarter**

**Fourth quarter**

**Top passers**

- STL –
- BAL –

**Top rushers**

- STL –
- BAL –

**Top receivers**

- STL –
- BAL –

**Top tacklers**

- STL –
- BAL –

Case Keenum got the start at quarterback in place of the incumbent Nick Foles and led the Rams to a 13-3 third quarter lead. Todd Gurley scored on a 1-yard run late in the first quarter and Keenum connected with tight end Lance Kendricks on a 30-yard touchdown pass in the third period. But the host Ravens scored 13 unanswered points in the final quarter. With the game tied at 13, kicker Greg Zuerlein missed a 52-yarder which would have sealed the Rams victory. The host Ravens scored 13 unanswered points in the final period, and after Keenum fumbled following a sack with under a minute left, Baltimore took over with Justin Tucker converting a 41-yarder as time expired to give the Ravens the final score and the win. With the loss, the Rams fell to 4-6, extending their losing streak to three games.

==== Week 12: at Cincinnati Bengals ====
Week Twelve: St. Louis Rams at Cincinnati Bengals – Game summary

| Quarter | 1 | 2 | 3 | 4 | Total |
|---|---|---|---|---|---|
| Rams | 0 | 7 | 0 | 0 | **7** |
| **Bengals** | 7 | 10 | 14 | 0 | **31** |

at Paul Brown Stadium, Cincinnati, Ohio

- Date: November 29
- Game time: 1:00 pm. EST/12:00 pm. CST
- Game weather: 41 °F (5 °C), cloudy
- Game attendance: 61,022
- Referee: Craig Wrolstad
- TV announcers (Fox): Thom Brennaman, Charles Davis and Tony Siragusa
- Recap, Gamebook

Game information

**First quarter**

**Second quarter**

**Third quarter**

**Fourth quarter**

**Top passers**

- STL –
- CIN –

**Top rushers**

- STL –
- CIN –

**Top receivers**

- STL –
- CIN –

**Top tacklers**

- STL –
- CIN –

The Rams fell to 4-7 with a blowout loss in Cincinnati. A week after being benched, Nick Foles returned as the Rams' starting quarterback after Case Keenum suffered a concussion at the end of the previous week's loss to Baltimore. However, Foles struggled to find open receivers and was hit at least a dozen times by the Bengals defense, which also picked off the St. Louis QB three times including which was returned for a touchdown. The only Rams score came on a 5-yard run by Tavon Austin on a reverse play in the second quarter. St. Louis' defense was not a factor all game as they struggled to stop the high-powered Bengals offense led by quarterback Andy Dalton (233 yards, three TD passes), and receivers A. J. Green, and Tyler Eifert, (the latter left the game with a stinger) as the Rams extended their losing streak to four games.

==== Week 13: vs. Arizona Cardinals ====
Week Thirteen: Arizona Cardinals at St. Louis Rams – Game summary

| Quarter | 1 | 2 | 3 | 4 | Total |
|---|---|---|---|---|---|
| **Cardinals** | 7 | 3 | 14 | 3 | **27** |
| Rams | 0 | 0 | 3 | 0 | **3** |

at Edward Jones Dome, St. Louis, Missouri

- Date: December 6
- Game time: 12:00 pm. CST
- Game weather: Played indoors (dome stadium)
- Game attendance: 51,115
- Referee: Bill Vinovich
- TV announcers (Fox): Chris Myers, Ronde Barber and Jennifer Hale
- Recap, Gamebook

Game information

**First quarter**

**Second quarter**

**Third quarter**

**Fourth quarter**

**Top passers**

- ARI –
- STL –

**Top rushers**

- ARI –
- STL –

**Top receivers**

- ARI –
- STL –

**Top tacklers**

- ARI –
- STL –

The Rams' streak of futility reached five games as they were routed by the visiting Cardinals. The St. Louis offense sputtered badly with only 214 total yards and a single field goal. Todd Gurley was limited to just 41 rushing yards (with 34 of those yards coming on a single run in the third period), while Nick Foles (15-35-146 yards, 1 INT) was again ineffective at quarterback. A day after the loss that dropped the Rams dropped to 4-8, offensive coordinator Frank Cignetti Jr. was fired. This game marked the final game the former St. Louis Cardinals (1960-87) would ever play in the city of St. Louis.

==== Week 14: vs. Detroit Lions ====
Week Fourteen: Detroit Lions at St. Louis Rams – Game summary

| Quarter | 1 | 2 | 3 | 4 | Total |
|---|---|---|---|---|---|
| Lions | 0 | 0 | 7 | 7 | **14** |
| **Rams** | 0 | 7 | 7 | 7 | **21** |

at Edward Jones Dome, St. Louis, Missouri

- Date: December 13
- Game time: 12:00 pm. CST
- Game weather: Played indoors (dome stadium)
- Game attendance: 51,202
- Referee: Walt Anderson
- TV announcers (Fox): Chris Myers, Ronde Barber and Jennifer Hale
- Recap, Gamebook

Game information

**First quarter**

- No scoring plays.

**Second quarter**

- STL – Trumaine Johnson 58-yard interception return (Greg Zuerlein kick), 5:07. Rams 7–0.

**Third quarter**

- DET – Golden Tate 9-yard pass from Matthew Stafford (Matt Prater kick), 7:39. Tied 7–7. **Drive: 7 plays, 65 yards, 4:21.**
- STL – Todd Gurley 5-yard run (Greg Zuerlein kick), 4:02. Rams 14–7. **Drive: 5 plays, 80 yards, 3:38.**

**Fourth quarter**

- STL – Todd Gurley 15-yard run (Greg Zuerlein kick), 12:25. Rams 21–7. **Drive: 7 plays, 91 yards, 3:33.**
- DET – Golden Tate 2-yard pass from Matthew Stafford (Matt Prater kick), 2:07. Rams 21–14. **Drive: 14 plays, 86 yards, 4:13.**

**Top passers**

- DET – Matthew Stafford – 30/46, 245 yards, 2 TD, INT
- STL – Case Keenum – 14/22, 124 yards, INT

**Top rushers**

- DET – Joique Bell – 7 rushes, 50 yards
- STL – Todd Gurley – 16 rushes, 140 yards, 2 TD

**Top receivers**

- DET – Golden Tate – 9 receptions, 60 yards, 2 TD
- STL – Kenny Britt – 2 receptions, 35 yards

**Top tacklers**

- DET –
- STL –

The Rams finally snapped their five-game losing streak by defeating the visiting Detroit Lions. St. Louis cornerback Trumaine Johnson picked off Detroit quarterback Matthew Stafford and returned it 58 yards for a touchdown in the second quarter to break a scoreless tie, while defensive tackle Aaron Donald was named NFC Defensive Player of the Week for the second time in the season after recording five tackles including three of his team's four sacks of Stafford on the day. Todd Gurley ran for 140 yards on 16 carries with two TD runs in the second half. Following the game, a photo of rapper and Roc Nation founder Jay Z in the Rams locker room along with his client Gurley and several Rams players was released shortly after.

==== Week 15: vs. Tampa Bay Buccaneers ====
Week Fifteen: Tampa Bay Buccaneers at St. Louis Rams – Game summary

| Quarter | 1 | 2 | 3 | 4 | Total |
|---|---|---|---|---|---|
| Buccaneers | 3 | 0 | 3 | 17 | **23** |
| **Rams** | 14 | 7 | 7 | 3 | **31** |

at Edward Jones Dome, St. Louis, Missouri

- Date: December 17
- Game time: 7:25 pm. CST
- Game weather: Played indoors (dome stadium)
- Game attendance: 51,295
- Referee: Jerome Boger
- TV announcers (NFLN): Ian Eagle, Trent Green and Evan Washburn
- Recap, Gamebook

Game information

**First quarter**

**Second quarter**

**Third quarter**

**Fourth quarter**

**Top passers**

- TB –
- STL –

**Top rushers**

- TB –
- STL –

**Top receivers**

- TB –
- STL –

**Top tacklers**

- TB –
- STL –

In what ultimately turned out to be their final game played in St. Louis, the Rams never trailed and turned in a solid performance on both offense and defense. Case Keenum completed 14 of 17 passes for 234 yards and a pair of touchdown passes in the first quarter to wide receivers Tavon Austin (17 yards) and Kenny Britt (60 yards). Austin also scored on a 21-yard TD run and Todd Gurley added another score on a 3-yard run in the second quarter. Gurley, who had 48 rushing yards on 21 carries, surpassed 1,000 rushing yards for the season. The game marked the debut of the team's "Color Rush" uniforms, which used yellow gold as the team's primary color with striping matching the millennium blue of the team's primary uniform, while the helmets used the design matching as the team's throwback uniforms. During the game, Rams fans were seen holding signs saying, "Keep the Rams in St. Louis" and chants of "Keep the Rams" were heard during postgame coverage.

==== Week 16: at Seattle Seahawks ====
Week Sixteen: St. Louis Rams at Seattle Seahawks – Game summary

| Quarter | 1 | 2 | 3 | 4 | Total |
|---|---|---|---|---|---|
| **Rams** | 10 | 6 | 0 | 7 | **23** |
| Seahawks | 0 | 3 | 7 | 7 | **17** |

at CenturyLink Field, Seattle, Washington

- Date: December 27
- Game time: 3:25 pm. CST/1:25 p.m. PST
- Game weather: 37 °F (3 °C), cloudy
- Game attendance: 69,080
- Referee: John Hussey
- TV announcers (Fox): Chris Myers, Ronde Barber and Holly Sonders
- Recap, Gamebook

Game information

**First quarter**

**Second quarter**

**Third quarter**

**Fourth quarter**

**Top passers**

- STL –
- SEA –

**Top rushers**

- STL –
- SEA –

**Top receivers**

- STL –
- SEA –

**Top tacklers**

- STL –
- SEA –

Despite having been eliminated from playoff contention for the 11th consecutive season (due to Seattle's victory over Cleveland in Week 15), the Rams were able to sweep the Seahawks for the first time since 2004. St. Louis built a 16-0 first half lead on kicker Greg Zuerlein's 42-yard field goal, linebacker Akeem Ayers's recovery of a forced fumble by linebacker Mark Barron that was returned 45 yards for a touchdown, and a 28-yard TD pass from quarterback Case Keenum to wide receiver Kenny Britt. Running back Todd Gurley ended his season with 83 yards on 19 carries, including a 2-yard touchdown run early in the fourth quarter. Rams defensive end William Hayes had nine total tackles including three sacks of Seattle quarterback Russell Wilson. With the victory, the Rams' record improved to 7-8, riding a three-game winning streak.

==== Week 17: at San Francisco 49ers ====
Week Seventeen: St. Louis Rams at San Francisco 49ers – Game summary

| Quarter | 1 | 2 | 3 | 4 | OT | Total |
|---|---|---|---|---|---|---|
| Rams | 3 | 13 | 0 | 0 | 0 | **16** |
| **49ers** | 0 | 10 | 3 | 3 | 3 | **19** |

at Levi's Stadium, Santa Clara, California

- Date: January 3, 2016
- Game time: 3:25 pm. CST/1:25 pm. PST
- Game weather: 53 °F (12 °C), partly cloudy
- Game attendance: 70,799
- Referee: Walt Coleman
- TV announcers (CBS): Tom McCarthy and Adam Archuleta
- Recap, Gamebook

Game information

**First quarter**

**Second quarter**

**Third quarter**

**Fourth quarter**

**Top passers**

- STL –
- SF –

**Top rushers**

- STL –
- SF –

**Top receivers**

- STL –
- SF –

**Top tacklers**

- STL –
- SF –

The Rams were thwarted in their attempt to avoid a ninth consecutive losing season, falling to the host 49ers in overtime. Kicker Greg Zuerlein kicked field goals of 33, 32, and 44 yards in the first half while running back Tre Mason scored a touchdown on a 4-yard run late in the second quarter as St. Louis built a 16-10 halftime lead. Cornerback Trumaine Johnson led the Rams with 10 total tackles while linebacker Eugene Sims ran an interception back 42 yards to set up the touchdown by Mason, who had 18 carries for 44 yards in place of Todd Gurley, who was inactive due to a foot injury suffered the previous week. The Rams' best chance for victory came late in the third quarter as they drove 46 yards in 12 plays but Zuerlein missed a 52-yard attempt. St. Louis was ineffective on offense, punting on all three of its fourth quarter possessions as San Francisco rallied to tie the game with a pair of field goals from kicker Phil Dawson in the second half. During the overtime period, the Rams again drove 12 plays covering 51 yards, but Zuerlein's 48-yard field goal attempt was blocked with five minutes remaining, and the 49ers went on to win five plays later on a 23-yard field goal by Dawson. The loss would be the team's final game as the St. Louis Rams. Two days later, the franchise filed for relocation to Los Angeles, where the Rams had played from 1946 to 1994. On January 12, 2016, the Rams' relocation bid was approved by a vote of NFL owners at a league meeting in Houston.

== Standings ==
=== Division ===
NFC West
| | W | L | T | PCT | DIV | CONF | PF | PA | STK |
|---|---|---|---|---|---|---|---|---|---|
| ^{(2)} Arizona Cardinals | 13 | 3 | 0 | .813 | 4–2 | 10–2 | 489 | 313 | L1 |
| ^{(6)} Seattle Seahawks | 10 | 6 | 0 | .625 | 3–3 | 7–5 | 423 | 277 | W1 |
| St. Louis Rams | 7 | 9 | 0 | .438 | 4–2 | 6–6 | 280 | 330 | L1 |
| San Francisco 49ers | 5 | 11 | 0 | .313 | 1–5 | 4–8 | 238 | 387 | W1 |

=== Conference ===
NFC
| # | Team | Division | W | L | T | PCT | DIV | CONF | SOS | SOV | STK |
|---|---|---|---|---|---|---|---|---|---|---|---|
Division Leaders
| 1 | Carolina Panthers | South | 15 | 1 | 0 | .938 | 5–1 | 11–1 | .441 | .438 | W1 |
| 2 | Arizona Cardinals | West | 13 | 3 | 0 | .813 | 4–2 | 10–2 | .477 | .457 | L1 |
| 3 | Minnesota Vikings | North | 11 | 5 | 0 | .688 | 5–1 | 8–4 | .504 | .449 | W3 |
| 4 | Washington Redskins | East | 9 | 7 | 0 | .563 | 4–2 | 8–4 | .465 | .403 | W4 |
Wild Cards
| 5 (Note: Green Bay finished ahead of Seattle based on head-to-head victory.) | Green Bay Packers | North | 10 | 6 | 0 | .625 | 3–3 | 7–5 | .531 | .450 | L2 |
| 6 | Seattle Seahawks | West | 10 | 6 | 0 | .625 | 3–3 | 7–5 | .520 | .431 | W1 |
Did not qualify for the postseason
| 7 | Atlanta Falcons | South | 8 | 8 | 0 | .500 | 1–5 | 5–7 | .480 | .453 | L1 |
| 8 (Note: St. Louis and Detroit finished ahead of Philadelphia and New Orleans based on conference record. St. Louis finished ahead of Detroit based on head-to-head victory. Detroit finished ahead of Philadelphia and New Orleans based on head-to-head sweep, while Philadelphia finished ahead of New Orleans based on head-to-head victory.) | St. Louis Rams | West | 7 | 9 | 0 | .438 | 4–2 | 6–6 | .527 | .482 | L1 |
| 9 | Detroit Lions | North | 7 | 9 | 0 | .438 | 3–3 | 6–6 | .535 | .429 | W3 |
| 10 | Philadelphia Eagles | East | 7 | 9 | 0 | .438 | 3–3 | 4–8 | .508 | .473 | W1 |
| 11 | New Orleans Saints | South | 7 | 9 | 0 | .438 | 3–3 | 5–7 | .504 | .402 | W2 |
| 12 (Note: The New York Giants and Chicago each finished ahead of Tampa Bay based on head-to-head victory, while the Giants finished ahead of Chicago based on conference record.) | New York Giants | East | 6 | 10 | 0 | .375 | 2–4 | 4–8 | .500 | .396 | L3 |
| 13 | Chicago Bears | North | 6 | 10 | 0 | .375 | 1–5 | 3–9 | .547 | .469 | L1 |
| 14 | Tampa Bay Buccaneers | South | 6 | 10 | 0 | .375 | 3–3 | 5–7 | .484 | .406 | L4 |
| 15 | San Francisco 49ers | West | 5 | 11 | 0 | .313 | 1–5 | 4–8 | .539 | .463 | W1 |
| 16 | Dallas Cowboys | East | 4 | 12 | 0 | .250 | 3–3 | 3–9 | .531 | .438 | L4 |
Tiebreakers (Note: When breaking ties for three or more teams under the NFL's rules, they are first broken within divisions, then comparing only the highest-ranked remaining team from each division.)

== Awards and honors ==
| Recipient | Award(s) |
|---|---|
| Aaron Donald | Week 1: NFC Defensive Player of the Week; Week 14: NFC Defensive Player of the Week |
| Tavon Austin | Week 1: NFC Special Teams Player of the Week |
| Benny Cunningham | Week 15: NFC Special Teams Player of the Week |
| Todd Gurley | NFL Offensive Rookie of the Year |
