= Johnny Hekker =

American football player (born 1990)

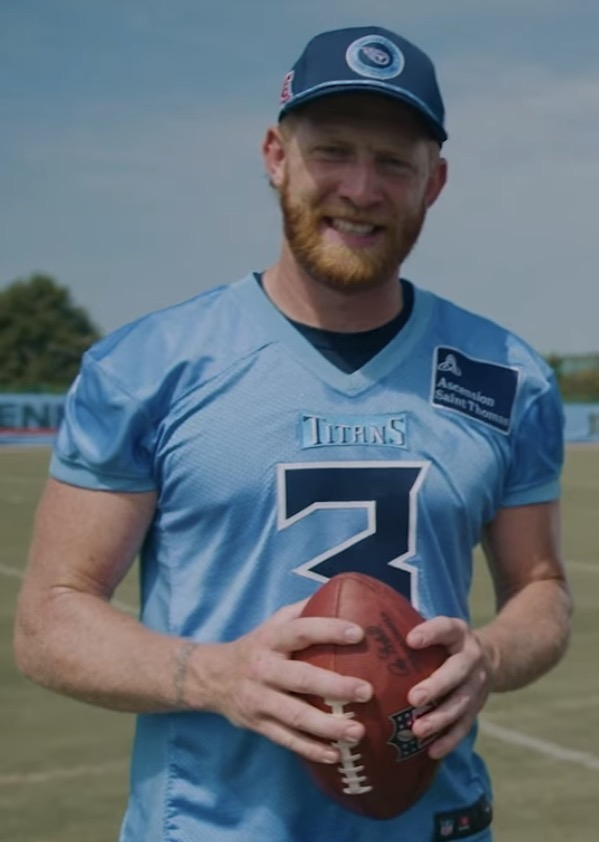
- Hekker with the Tennessee Titans in 2025

Profile
- Position: Punter

Personal information
- Born: February 8, 1990 (age 36); Redmond, Washington, U.S.
- Listed height: 6 ft 5 in (1.96 m)
- Listed weight: 225 lb (102 kg)

Career information
- High school: Bothell (Bothell, Washington)
- College: Oregon State (2008–2011)
- NFL draft: 2012: undrafted

Career history
- St. Louis / Los Angeles Rams (2012–2021); Carolina Panthers (2022–2024); Tennessee Titans (2025); Minnesota Vikings (2026)

Awards and highlights
- Super Bowl champion (LVI); 4× First-team All-Pro (2013, 2015–2017); 2× Second-team All-Pro (2014, 2018); 4× Pro Bowl (2013, 2015–2017); 2× NFL punting yards leader (2015, 2016); NFL 2010s All-Decade Team; NFL records: Highest net average punting yards in a season: 46.0 (2016); Longest punt in a Super Bowl: 65 yards (LIII)

Career NFL statistics as of Week 4, 2026
- Punts: 1,053
- Punting yards: 49,228
- Punting average: 46.8
- Longest punt: 78
- Inside 20: 402
- Touchbacks: 63
- Stats at Pro Football Reference

John Robert Hekker (born February 8, 1990) is an American professional football punter. He played college football for the Oregon State Beavers and was signed by the St. Louis Rams as an undrafted free agent in 2012. Hekker played ten seasons with the St. Louis / Los Angeles Rams from 2012 to 2021, appearing in Super Bowl LIII and winning in Super Bowl LVI. He played for the Carolina Panthers from 2022 to 2024, and for the Tennessee Titans in 2025. Hekker is a four-time First-team All-Pro and four-time Pro Bowler. He also holds the NFL record for longest punt in Super Bowl history, with a 65-yarder that he delivered in Super Bowl LIII.

== Early life ==
Hekker was born in Redmond, Washington. He attended Bothell High School in Bothell, Washington, and graduated in 2008. He was the starting quarterback and punter of the Cougars football team during his senior year, leading them to a State Championship game, which they lost. He also briefly played basketball for the school in his senior year.

== College career ==
Hekker played for the Oregon State Beavers football team while attending Oregon State University. In 2008, Hekker was named the Sun Bowl Special Teams MVP after averaging 45 yards on 10 punts, including boots of 57 and 52 yards in the fourth quarter of a 3–0 win for the Beavers over the Pitt Panthers. He was a four-year starter and finished his college career as one of Oregon State's most prolific punters. As a Beaver, he set a single-game school record with a 52.5 average (six punts for 315 yards) against the Utah Utes in 2011.

Hekker ranked third-best in career-punt yardage in school history with a solid 41.3 yards average per punt. In 2011, he earned College Football Performance Award Punter of the Week and was named to the Ray Guy Award Watch List – given annually to the nation's best punter. In 2009, he was semi-finalist for the Ray Guy Award and the Phil Steele All-Pac-10 Second-team. As a senior, Hekker recorded a total of 52 career punts over 50 yards, including 17 when he had six different games with at least one punt of 60+ yards.

Hekker earned Pac-12 Conference Honorable Mention with 87 career punts downed inside the 20-yard line in 2011. He also had at least one punt of 50+ yards in every game but one in 2010.

Hekker had several memorable kicks as a Beaver. One was the second-longest punt in school history. The punt went for 74 yards in 2010 against USC. Another was a negative-yardage punt when he shanked the ball for a loss of 4 yards.

For three years, Hekker also worked as the holder on placekicks.

== Professional career ==
=== St. Louis / Los Angeles Rams ===
==== 2012 season ====
In 2012, Hekker was signed as an undrafted free agent with the St. Louis Rams.

During Week 2, Hekker was nominated for Pepsi NFL Rookie of the Week after recording three punts for 163 yards and a 54.33 net punt average, with the longest punt being 66 yards. Two weeks later against the Seattle Seahawks, Hekker threw a 2-yard touchdown pass to wide receiver Danny Amendola on a fake field goal. He became the first Rams punter to throw a touchdown pass since the AFL-NFL merger.

During Week 5 against the Arizona Cardinals, Hekker set a Rams franchise record with a gross punting average of 56.9 in one game, beating the old mark of 56.0 set by Donnie Jones on three other occasions. Hekker recorded seven punts for 398 yards in the game, placing three of his punts inside the opponent's 20-yard line. He had two punts of 60 plus yards. In doing so, he stopped Patrick Peterson from returning a punt for a touchdown against St. Louis, as he did in both rivalry games last season. Hekker was again nominated for Pepsi NFL Rookie of the Week.

During Week 10 against the San Francisco 49ers, Hekker converted on two fake punt passes for 40 yards, while having four punts with a 31-yard average and placing one of them inside the opponent's 20-yard line in a 24–24 tie. The first of the two passes was an audible called by Hekker himself after gunner Rodney McLeod was left uncovered. Hekker was again nominated for Pepsi NFL Rookie of the Week.

Hekker finished his rookie season with 82 punts for 3,756 net yards for a 45.8 average.

==== 2013 season ====
On December 29, 2013, Hekker officially broke the single season record for net punt yards (44.2), previously held by Andy Lee (44) in 2006 for the San Francisco 49ers. Hekker finished his second professional season with 78 punts for 3,609 net yards for a 46.27 average. He earned Pro Bowl and First Team All-Pro honors.

==== 2014 season ====
On October 19, 2014, Hekker threw a pass to running back Benny Cunningham on a fake punt with 1:14 left in a game against the Seahawks.

On December 5, 2014, Hekker agreed to a six-year, $18 million contract extension with $9 million guaranteed. His deal is the largest contract ever given to a punter. Hekker finished the 2014 season with 80 punts for 3,721 net yards for a 46.51 average.

==== 2015 season ====
Hekker was named NFC Special Teams Player of the Month for October. On December 27, 2015, early in the second quarter of a game against the Seahawks, Hekker was penalized 15 yards for unnecessary roughness for shoving Cliff Avril after a 45-yard punt. Later in the game, Hekker dropped to the ground when he thought Michael Bennett was going to hit him as retaliation. Bennett later said that Hekker acted "like a little girl" in a post game interview.

In the 2015 season, Hekker again led the league in net punting average and was named as an All-Pro by the Associated Press for the second time. He was named to the Pro Bowl for his 2015 campaign. He led the league in punts and punting yards with 96 and 4,601, respectively.

==== 2016 season ====
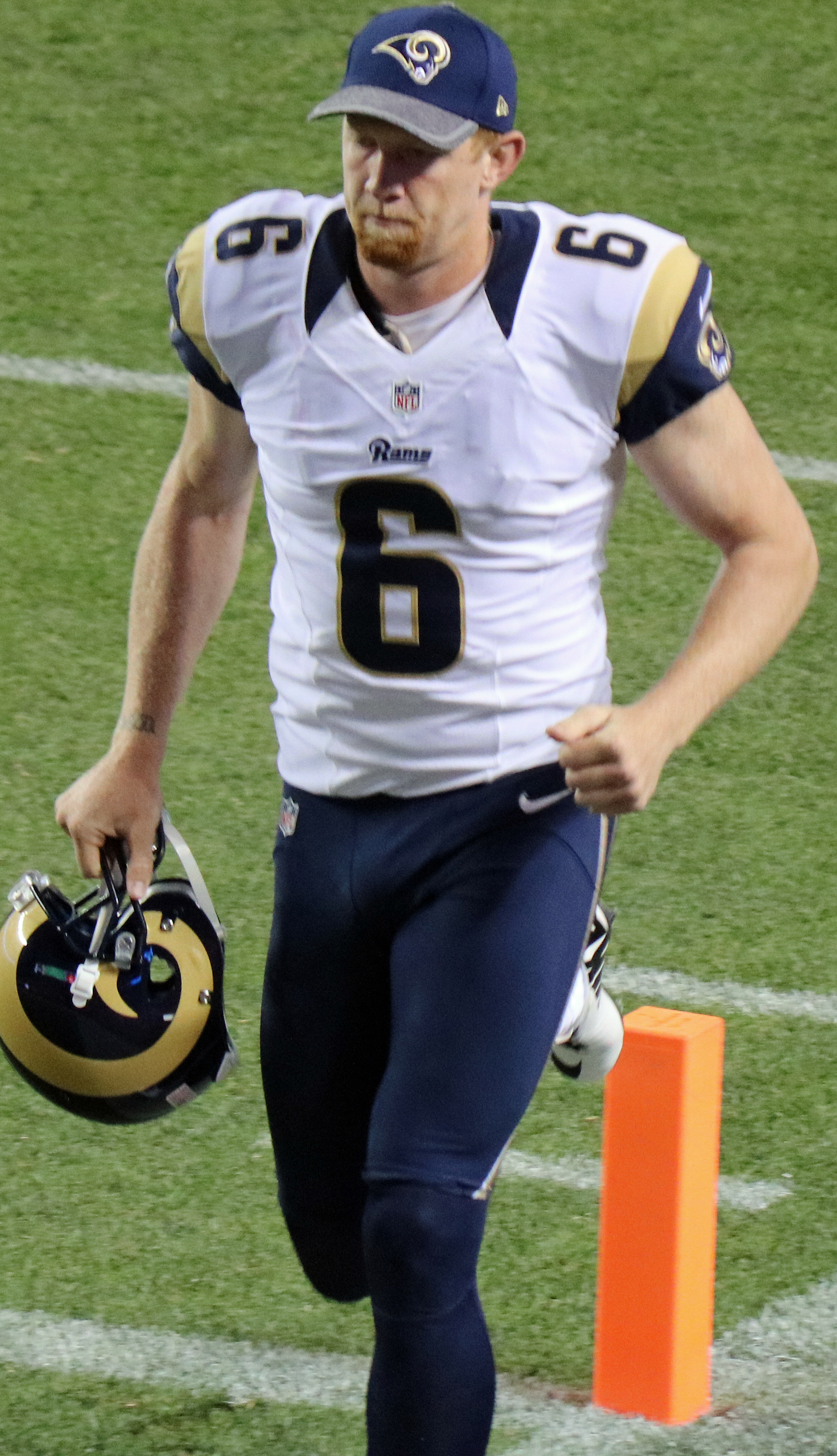
Hekker with the Rams in 2016

In 2016, Hekker set NFL records for punts downed inside the 20 (51), had only one touchback, and broke his own record for net punting yardage (46.0). Some speculated his performance ranked as the greatest punting season ever.

Hekker was named to his third Pro Bowl and his third First-team All-Pro. Hekker finished the 2016 season with 98 punts for a league-leading 4,680 net yards for a 47.76 average.

==== 2017 season ====
On September 11, 2017, Hekker signed a two-year contract extension with the Rams through the 2022 season.

During Week 2 against the Washington Redskins, Hekker recorded a 28-yard pass to Josh Reynolds on a successful fake punt. On December 19, 2017, he was named to his fourth Pro Bowl. He earned First Team All-Pro honors.

Hekker finished the 2017 season with 65 punts for 3,113 net yards for a 47.89 average. The Rams finished the season atop the NFC West with an 11–5 record and made the playoffs as the #3-seed. In his playoff debut, Hekker had five punts for 218 net yards for a 43.6 average in the 26–13 loss to the Atlanta Falcons in the Wild Card Round.

==== 2018 season: First Super Bowl appearance ====
During Week 2 against the Cardinals, Hekker (normally the holder) had to take placekicking duties when placekicker Greg Zuerlein was injured. He converted an extra point and a field goal in the 34–0 shoutout victory. During a Week 9 45–35 road loss the New Orleans Saints, Hekker ran three yards on a fake field goal attempt, but was ruled a yard short of the first down marker.

During the season, Hekker also completed two of four pass attempts for 19 yards on fake punt attempts, with both completions leading to first downs for the Rams. In 2018, he punted a career-low 43 times for 1,992 yards (46.3 average), and only once punted more than four times in any game due to the Rams' prolific offense. Hekker missed Pro Bowl and first-team All-Pro honors for the first time since 2014.

In the playoffs, the Rams defeated both the Dallas Cowboys in the Divisional Round and Saints in the NFC Championship. In the NFC Championship against the Saints with Rams down 13–0 early in the second quarter, Hekker ran a fake punt and threw a 12-yard pass to Sam Shields to get a first down and put the Rams in position to get their first points of the game. Playing against the New England Patriots in Super Bowl LIII, he set a Super Bowl record with a 65-yard punt, breaking the record set by the Patriots' Ryan Allen, whom Hekker competed with at Oregon State. The Rams went on to lose the Super Bowl 13–3 as Hekker punted nine times for 417 yards.

==== 2019 season ====
During Week 10 against the Pittsburgh Steelers, Hekker threw a pass on a fake punt that was intercepted by running back Trey Edmunds in the 17–12 road loss. In Week 17, he earned NFC Special Teams Player of the Week for his game against the Cardinals. For the season, he averaged more than 47 yards per kick for the fourth time in his career. He was named to the Pro Football Hall of Fame All-Decade Team for the 2010s.

==== 2020 season ====
During Week 7 against the Chicago Bears, Hekker punted five times and each one was downed at or inside the opposing 10-yard line. He averaged 44.2 yards per punt with a long of 63 in the Rams' 24–10 victory on Monday Night Football, earning NFC Special Teams Player of the Week for the fourth time in his career. The following day, Hekker was also honored as NFC Special Teams Player of the Month, the third time he had been so honored. In the 2020 season, he punted 68 times for 3,099 net yards for a 45.57 average.

==== 2021 season: Super Bowl championship ====
In 2021, Hekker totaled 51 punts for 2,252 yards, with 23 of 51 punts being downed inside the opponent's own 20-yard line. In the Wild Card Round against the Cardinals, Hekker planted all five of his punts inside the opposing 20-yard line, earning him praise from quarterback Matthew Stafford, who said Hekker's punting played a crucial role in the Rams 34–11 victory. He won Super Bowl LVI when the Rams defeated the Cincinnati Bengals by a score of 23–20 and punted six times for 261 yards in the game.

On March 16, 2022, Hekker was released by the Rams.

=== Carolina Panthers ===
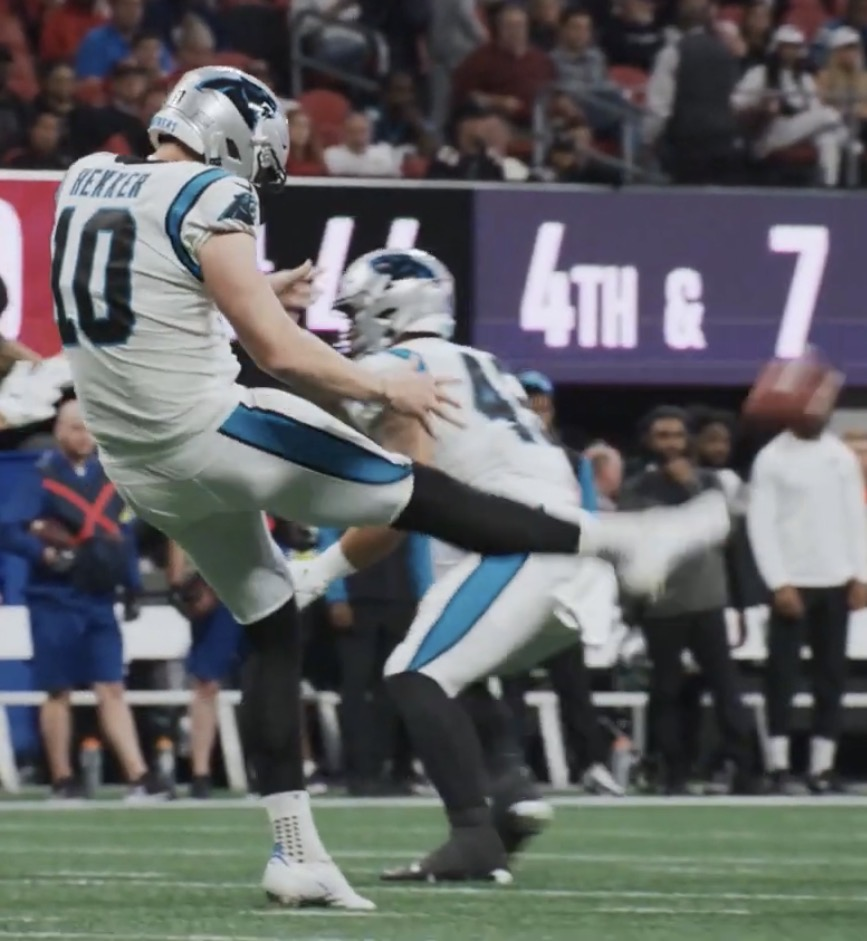
Hekker with the Carolina Panthers in 2022

On March 18, 2022, Hekker signed a three-year, $7.6 million contract with the Carolina Panthers. He had 81 punts for 3,925 total yards for a 48.46 average in the 2022 season. In the 2023 season, he had 82 punts for 3,838 total yards for a 46.80 average. In the 2024 season, he had 73 punts for 3,338 total yards for a 45.73 average.

=== Tennessee Titans ===
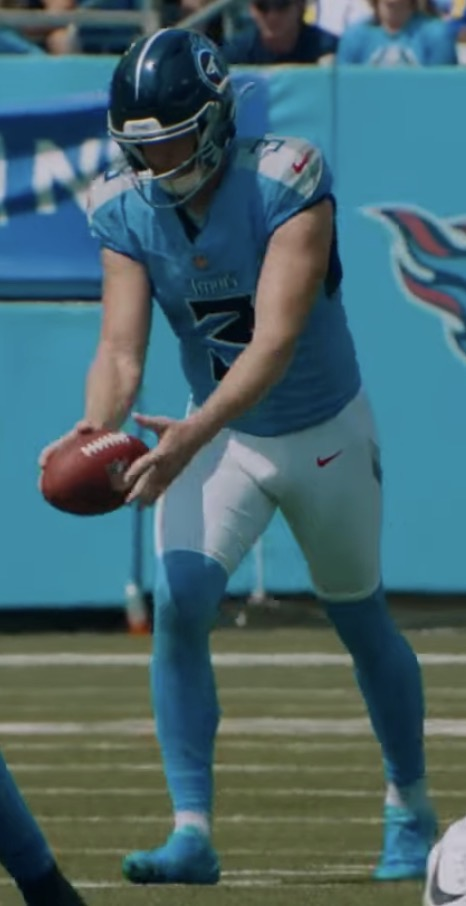
Hekker with the Tennessee Titans in 2025

On March 13, 2025, Hekker signed a one-year, $1.42 million contract with the Tennessee Titans. He had 78 punts for 3,653 yards for a 46.8 average in the 2025 season.

=== Minnesota Vikings ===
On March 17, 2026, Hekker signed a one-year contract with the Minnesota Vikings. On August 30, he was released by the Vikings as a part of the final roster cuts, having lost the punting competition to rookie Brett Thorson. On September 22, Hekker was re–signed to the Vikings' practice squad. On September 26, he was signed to the active roster. Hekker was released on September 29, after the Week 3 game against the Tampa Bay Buccaneers, where he punted the football eight times for 372 yards. He was re-signed to the practice squad the next day. On October 6, he was released from the practice squad.

== NFL career statistics ==
Legend
	Won the Super Bowl
	Led the league
**Bold**	Career high

=== Regular season ===
Year	Team	GP	Punting						Passing				
Year	Team	GP	Punts	Yds	Lng	Avg	Blk	Ins20	Cmp	Att	Yds	TD	Int
2012	STL	16	82	3,756	68	45.8	0	22	**3**	3	**42**	**1**	0
2013	STL	16	78	3,609	64	46.3	0	19	0	1	0	0	0
2014	STL	16	80	3,721	61	46.5	**1**	33	2	2	37	0	0
2015	STL	16	96	4,601	68	47.9	0	41	1	**4**	20	0	0
2016	LAR	16	**98**	**4,680**	**78**	47.8	0	**51**	1	2	4	0	0
2017	LAR	16	65	3,113	70	47.9	0	30	2	3	34	0	0
2018	LAR	16	43	1,992	68	46.3	0	21	2	**4**	19	0	0
2019	LAR	16	66	3,128	71	47.4	**1**	22	2	3	28	0	**1**
2020	LAR	16	68	3,099	63	45.6	**1**	28	—	—	—	—	—
2021	LAR	17	51	2,252	59	44.2	0	23	1	1	2	0	0
2022	CAR	17	81	3,935	68	**48.5**	0	39	—	—	—	—	—
2023	CAR	17	82	3,838	69	46.8	0	26	1	1	7	0	0
2024	CAR	17	73	3,338	65	45.7	**1**	24	0	2	0	0	0
2025	TEN	17	78	3,653	65	46.8	0	22	—	—	—	—	—
2026	MIN	2	12	523	63	43.6	0	2	—	—	—	—	—
Career		231	1,053	49,228	78	46.8	4	402	15	26	193	1	1

=== Postseason ===
Year	Team	GP	Punting						Passing				
Year	Team	GP	Punts	Yds	Lng	Avg	Blk	Ins20	Cmp	Att	Yds	TD	Int
2017	LAR	1	5	218	**66**	43.6	0	0	—	—	—	—	—
2018	LAR	3	14	629	65	44.9	0	0	**1**	**1**	**12**	0	0
2020	LAR	2	11	519	64	**47.2**	0	0	—	—	—	—	—
2021	LAR	4	**16**	**712**	58	44.5	0	**9**	—	—	—	—	—
Career		10	46	2,078	66	45.2	0	9	1	1	12	0	0

== Career highlights ==
=== Awards and honors ===
NFL

- Super Bowl champion (LVI)
- 4× First-team All-Pro (2013, 2015–2017)
- 2× Second-team All-Pro (2014, 2018)
- 4× Pro Bowl (2013, 2015–2017)
- 2× NFL punting yards leader (2015, 2016)
- NFL 2010s All-Decade Team
- 4× NFC Special Teams Player of the Month (2015 – October; 2016 – December; 2020 – October)
- 4× NFC Special Teams Player of the Week (2012 – Week 5, Week 14; 2016 – Week 4; 2016 – Week 10; 2019 – Week 17; 2020 – Week 7)

=== NFL records ===
- Highest net average punting yards in a season: 46.0 (2016)
- Longest punt in a Super Bowl: 65 yards (LIII)
- Most punts inside the 20 in a season: 51

== Media appearances ==
Hekker was the main athlete featured in a 2013 Dude Perfect YouTube video titled "NFL Kicking Edition | Dude Perfect" along with Rams teammates Greg Zuerlein and Jake McQuaide.

In 2018 Hekker appeared on the Netflix cooking show Nailed It as a guest judge for season 2 episode 3, titled "Tailgate, Failgate." During his introduction, he apologized that the show had to settle for a punter as a special guest for the football-themed episode.

== Personal life ==
Hekker is a Christian. He and his wife, Makayla, have three children together.
