= Benny Cunningham =

American football player (born 1990)

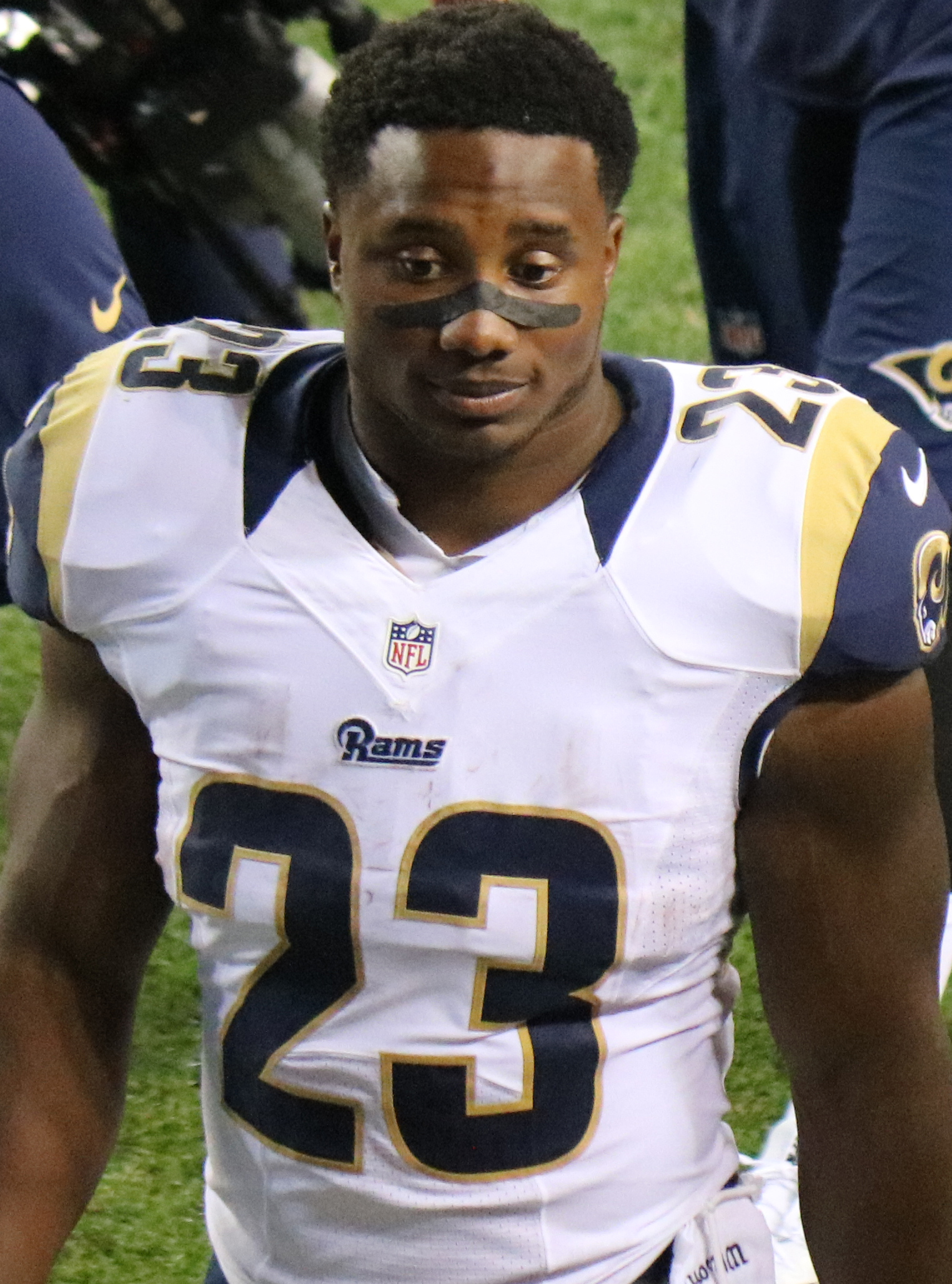
- Cunningham with the Los Angeles Rams in 2016

No. 36, 23, 30
- Position: Running back

Personal information
- Born: July 7, 1990 (age 36); Nashville, Tennessee, U.S.
- Listed height: 5 ft 10 in (1.78 m)
- Listed weight: 218 lb (99 kg)

Career information
- High school: Goodpasture Christian School (Madison, Tennessee)
- College: Middle Tennessee State (2009–2012)
- NFL draft: 2013: undrafted

Career history
- St. Louis / Los Angeles Rams (2013–2016); Chicago Bears (2017–2018); Jacksonville Jaguars (2019)*
- * Offseason or practice squad member only

Awards and highlights
- Second-team All-Sun Belt (2012)

Career NFL statistics
- Rushing attempts: 191
- Rushing yards: 797
- Rushing touchdowns: 4
- Receptions: 114
- Receiving yards: 1,001
- Receiving touchdowns: 3
- Stats at Pro Football Reference

Benjamin Corey Cunningham (born July 7, 1990) is an American former professional football player who was a running back in the National Football League (NFL). He played college football for the Middle Tennessee Blue Raiders and was signed by the St. Louis Rams as an undrafted free agent in 2013.

== Early life ==
Cunningham attended Goodpasture Christian School in Madison, Tennessee, where he was a letterman in football, basketball, and track. In football, he rushed for 721 yards and 16 touchdowns on offense, while collecting 62 tackles and an interception on defense. As a senior, he rushed for a new school record 1,744 yards and 2,357 all purpose yards to go along with 29 touchdowns, leading Goodpasture to the state semifinals. He was named the Tennessee Titans Mr. Football Class 2A Back for 2008, the TSWA All-State and the Region Player of the Year and was voted to the All-Southern Football Team by the Orlando Sentinel. He owns the school record in single-season rushing yards (1,744), career touchdowns (60), touchdowns in a game (five), touchdowns in a season (29), and all-purpose yards in a season (2,357) and career (4,611). He was also selected to play at the Tennessee East-West All-Star Game.

Also an standout track & field athlete, Cunningham was one of the state's top performers in the sprinting events. At the 2009 TSSAA State T&F Championships, he took gold in both the 100 meters, with a time of 10.6 seconds, and in the 200 meters, at 21.86 seconds. In addition, he competed in the 800 meter run event and was a member of the 4 × 100 m relay squad. He also recorded a 4.39 40-yard dash in practice.

Regarded only as a two-star recruit by the Rivals.com recruiting network, Cunningham chose MTSU over scholarship offers from Miami (OH) and Tennessee Tech.

== College career ==
Cunningham played for MTSU from 2009–2012. In 2009, he saw action in 11 games and was third on the team with 173 yards rushing on 46 attempts and two touchdowns. In 2010, he played in all 13 games and earned two starts and was fourth on the team with 355 rushing yards on 78 attempts to go with four touchdowns, and also had 16 receptions for 96 yards and returned 14 kickoffs for 364 yards (26.0). In 2011, he played in eight games and had six starts and was second on the team in rushing yards, with 501 yards and four touchdowns while leading all running backs with 17 receptions for 187 yards and a touchdown. In 2012, he was voted Second-team All-SBC and named Third-team All-SBC by CollegeSportsMadness.com, despite playing in just five games, he had his most productive season with 600 yards rushing and 11 touchdowns.

== Professional career ==
=== St. Louis / Los Angeles Rams ===
Cunningham was signed by the St. Louis Rams as an undrafted free agent in 2013 and made their 53-man roster. For the 2013 season, he carried the ball 47 times for 261 yards (5.6 average) and a touchdown. He added six receptions for 59 yards in a backup role. In the 2014 season, he had 246 rushing yards and three rushing touchdowns to go along with 45 receptions for 352 receiving yards and a touchdown. In the 2015 season, he had 37 carries for 140 rushing yards and 26 receptions for 250 yards.

Cunningham signed a one-year extension with the Rams on April 6, 2016.

Cunningham was placed on injured reserve on December 15, 2016, with a neck injury. He finished the 2016 season with 21 carries for 101 rushing yards and 16 receptions for 91 yards.

=== Chicago Bears ===
On March 21, 2017, Cunningham signed with the Chicago Bears.

On September 10, 2017, in his Bears debut, Cunningham had one punt return for 23 yards in the 23–17 home loss to the Atlanta Falcons at Soldier Field. On October 9, against the Minnesota Vikings, he had a 38-yard touchdown reception from punter Pat O'Donnell on a trick play. Overall, he finished the 2017 season with 20 receptions for 240 yards and two touchdowns.

On April 3, 2018, Cunningham re-signed with the Bears on a one-year contract. During the 2018 season, Cunningham recorded 20 rushing yards on 11 attempts and one reception for nine yards. Overall, in the 2018 season, he had 11 carries for 20 rushing yards to go along with eight kickoff returns for 173 net yards.

=== Jacksonville Jaguars ===
On April 2, 2019, Cunningham signed with the Jacksonville Jaguars. He was released by the Jaguars on August 11.

== NFL career statistics ==
Regular season statistics
Year	Team	Games		Rushing					Receiving					Fumbles	
Year	Team	GP	GS	Att	Yds	Avg	Lng	TD	Rec	Yds	Avg	Lng	TD	Fum	Lost
2013	STL	14	0	47	261	5.6	56	1	6	59	9.8	18	0	2	1
2014	STL	16	2	66	246	3.7	20	3	45	352	7.8	19	1	2	2
2015	STL	16	1	37	140	3.8	40	0	26	250	9.6	42	0	1	0
2016	LA	11	0	21	101	4.8	24	0	16	91	5.7	12	0	1	0
2017	CHI	14	0	9	29	3.2	12	0	20	240	12.0	40	2	1	1
2018	CHI	14	0	5	7	1.4	4	0	1	9	9.0	9	0	0	0
Career		85	3	185	784	4.2	56	4	114	1,001	8.8	42	3	7	4

== Personal life ==
After his playing career, Benny Cunningham alleged that the National Football League scripts its games and forces players to sign a non-disclosure agreement on the matter.
