= Christian Bryant =

American football player (born 1992)

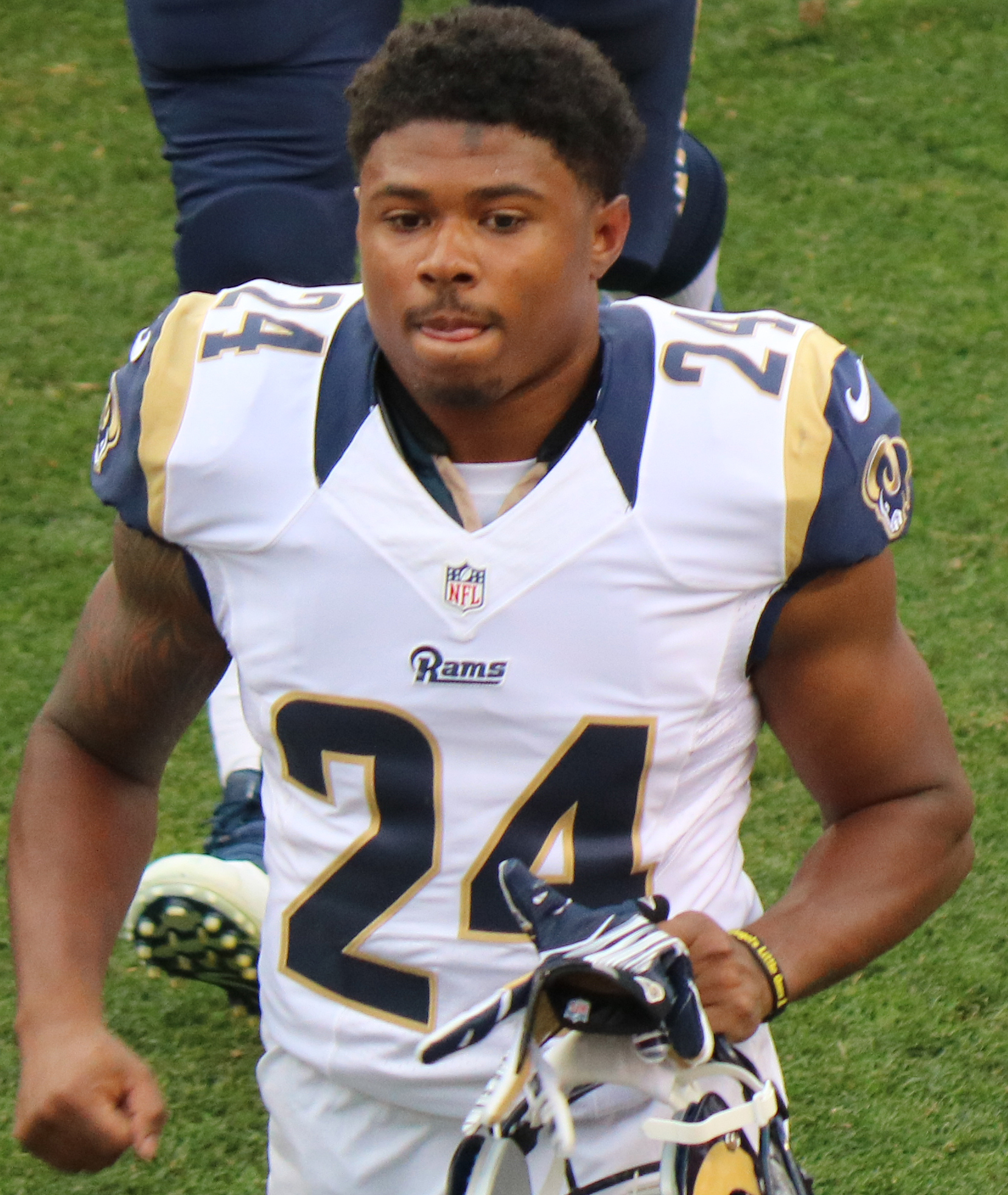
- Bryant with the Los Angeles Rams in 2016

No. 37, 25
- Position: Safety

Personal information
- Born: March 21, 1992 (age 34); Cleveland, Ohio, U.S.
- Listed height: 5 ft 10 in (1.78 m)
- Listed weight: 198 lb (90 kg)

Career information
- High school: Glenville (Cleveland)
- College: Ohio State
- NFL draft: 2014: 7th round, 241st overall pick

Career history
- St. Louis / Los Angeles Rams (2014–2015); Arizona Cardinals (2016); New York Giants (2016)*; Arizona Cardinals (2016); Cleveland Browns (2017)*; Birmingham Iron (2019)
- * Offseason or practice squad member only

Awards and highlights
- Second-team All-Big Ten (2012)

Career NFL statistics
- Total tackles: 5
- Stats at Pro Football Reference

Christian "C. B." Bryant (born March 21, 1992) is an American former professional football player who was a safety in the National Football League (NFL). He was selected by the St. Louis Rams in the seventh round of the 2014 NFL draft. He played college football for the Ohio State Buckeyes.

== Early life ==
Bryant attended Glenville High School in Cleveland, Ohio. He is the older brother of Seattle and Chicago safety Coby Bryant.

== College career ==
Bryant was pressed into safety duty as a true freshman in 2010 because of an injury to Tyler Moeller, but a foot issue kept him out of five games later in the season. He played in all 12 games in 2011, started nine times while battling through a shoulder issue that finally caused him to miss the regular season finale at Michigan. Ranked in a tie for third in the Big Ten with eight pass break-ups, and his eight total passes defended (pass breakups and interceptions) ranked 13th in the league. Was tied for second among Buckeyes in passes defended and was also third on the team with 68 tackles. Bryant had a fine junior campaign in 2012 that saw him earn second-team all-Big Ten Conference honors. His 70 tackles trailed only teammate Ryan Shazier's 115, and his 13 passes defended (12 pass breakups and one interception) ranked sixth in the Big Ten.

== Professional career ==
Pre-draft measurables
Height	Weight	Arm length	Hand span
5 ft 9 1/8 in (1.76 m)	198 lb (90 kg)	30 1/4 in (0.77 m)	8 1/4 in (0.21 m)
All values from Pro Day

=== St. Louis / Los Angeles Rams ===
Bryant was selected by the St. Louis Rams in the seventh round 241st overall in the 2014 NFL draft. He was waived during final cuts on August 30, 2014. He was signed to the Rams practice squad a few days later.

Bryant was waived for final roster cuts before the start of the 2015 season, but was re-signed to the practice squad on September 6, 2015. On October 2, Bryant was promoted to the active roster. He was waived on October 23. Bryant re-signed with the Rams four days later.

On September 3, 2016, Bryant was waived by the Rams as part of final roster cuts.

=== Arizona Cardinals (first stint) ===
On October 4, 2016, Bryant was signed to the Arizona Cardinals' practice squad. He was promoted to the active roster on November 1. Bryant was released by the Cardinals on November 28.

=== New York Giants ===
On November 30, 2016, Bryant was signed to the New York Giants' practice squad.

=== Arizona Cardinals (second stint) ===
On December 28, 2016, Bryant was signed by the Arizona Cardinals off the Giants' practice squad. He was waived by the Cardinals on May 11, 2017.

=== Cleveland Browns ===
On August 23, 2017, Bryant signed with the Cleveland Browns. He was waived by Cleveland on September 1, during final roster cutdowns.

=== Birmingham Iron ===
On September 20, 2018, Bryant signed with the Birmingham Iron of the Alliance of American Football. He was waived before the start of the regular season, but was re-signed on February 19, 2019. Bryant was waived again on March 4. He was added to the team's rights list and re-signed to a contract on April 1. The league ceased operations in April 2019.
