= Brian Quick =

American football player (born 1989)

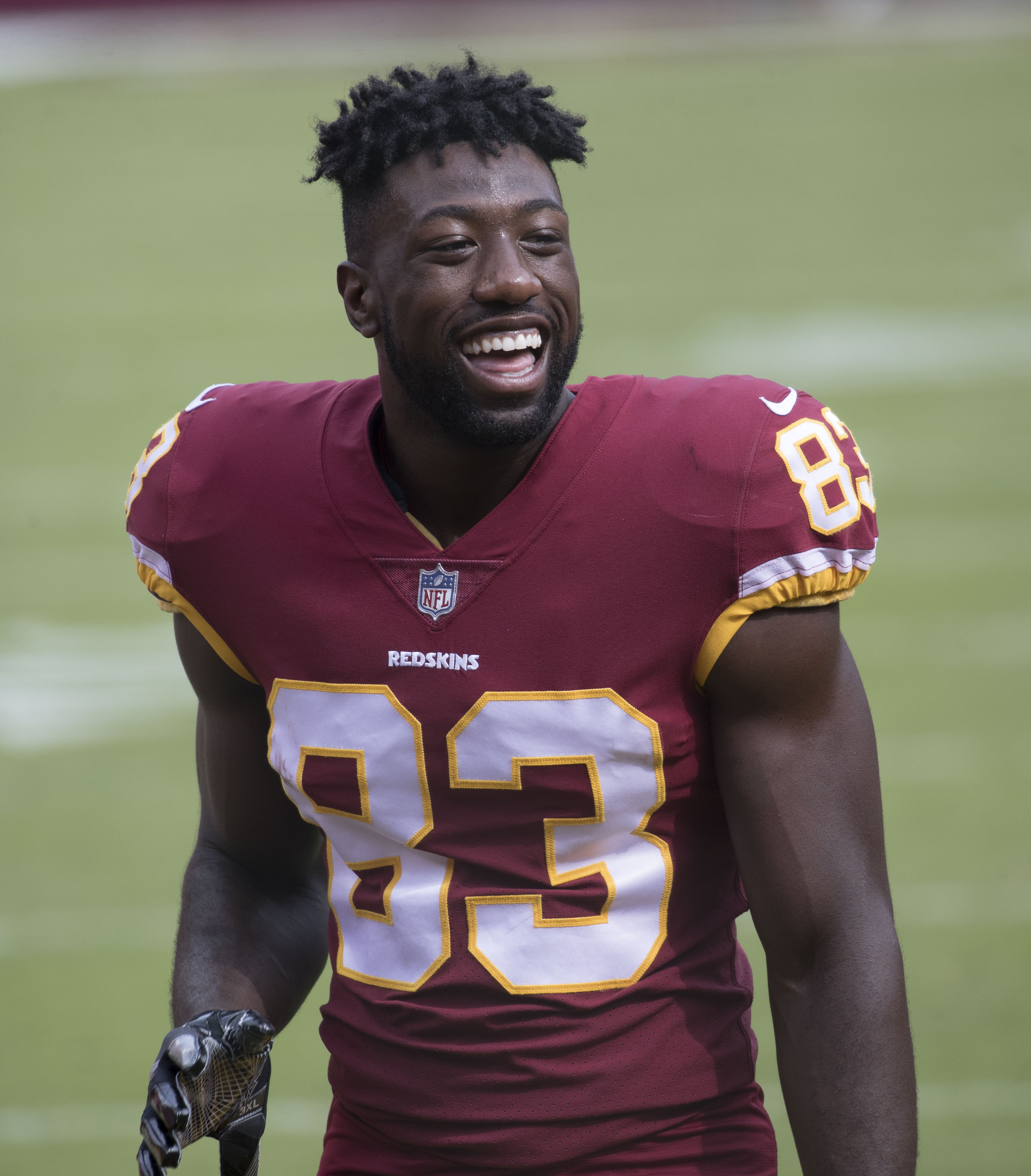
- Quick with the Washington Redskins in 2017

No. 83
- Position: Wide receiver

Personal information
- Born: June 5, 1989 (age 37); Columbia, South Carolina, U.S.
- Listed height: 6 ft 3 in (1.91 m)
- Listed weight: 215 lb (98 kg)

Career information
- High school: Ridge View (Columbia)
- College: Appalachian State (2007–2011)
- NFL draft: 2012: 2nd round, 33rd overall pick

Career history
- St. Louis / Los Angeles Rams (2012–2016); Washington Redskins (2017–2018)

Awards and highlights
- NCAA FCS national champion (2007); 2× FCS All-American (2010, 2011)

Career NFL statistics
- Receptions: 114
- Receiving yards: 1,593
- Receiving touchdowns: 10
- Stats at Pro Football Reference

Brian Rumeal Quick (born June 5, 1989) is an American former professional football player who was a wide receiver in the National Football League (NFL). He played college football for the Appalachian State Mountaineers, and was selected by the St. Louis Rams with the 1st pick in the second round of the 2012 NFL draft.

== Early life ==
A native of Columbia, South Carolina, Quick attended Ridge View High School, where he was a basketball standout until switching to football only in his senior year. He was unrated as a football prospect by Rivals.com.

== College career ==
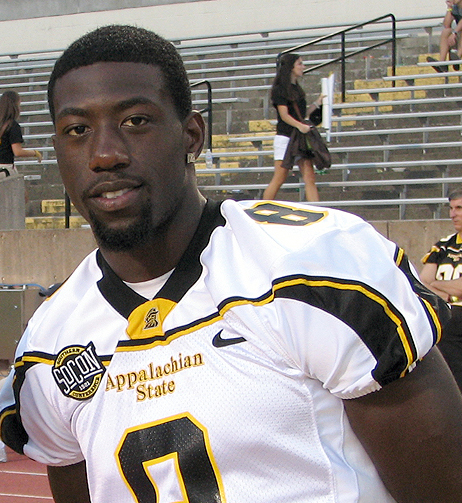
Quick with Appalachian State in 2011

As a freshman, he did not register a catch in two games before sitting out the rest of the season with a back injury. The next season, 2008, he rebounded from a slow start to become one of the nation’s top receivers over the final month and a half of the season. In 2009 Quick caught 61 passes for a team-best 982 yards for 16.1 yards-per-catch average. As a junior in 2010, Quick earned First-team All-America honors from Sporting News and was voted Second-team All-Southern Conference by the league’s coaches and media while leading ASU with 47 receptions, 844 receiving yards, nine touchdown catches and 18.0-yards-per-catch average. In his senior year, Quick recorded 71 receptions for 1,096 yards with 11 touchdowns. Sporting News named Quick to its Division I FCS All-America team as did the AFCA and he received Second-team accolades from the Associated Press and The Sports Network.

== Professional career ==
Pre-draft measurables
| Height | Weight | Arm length | Hand span | Wingspan | 40-yard dash | 10-yard split | 20-yard split | 20-yard shuttle | Three-cone drill | Vertical jump | Broad jump | Bench press |
|---|---|---|---|---|---|---|---|---|---|---|---|---|
| 6 ft 3 1/2 in (1.92 m) | 220 lb (100 kg) | 34 1/4 in (0.87 m) | 9 3/4 in (0.25 m) | 6 ft 8 7/8 in (2.05 m) | 4.53 s | 1.47 s | 2.59 s | 4.23 s | 7.10 s | 34 in (0.86 m) | 9 ft 11 in (3.02 m) | 15 reps |
All values from NFL Combine/ASU Pro Day

=== St. Louis / Los Angeles Rams ===
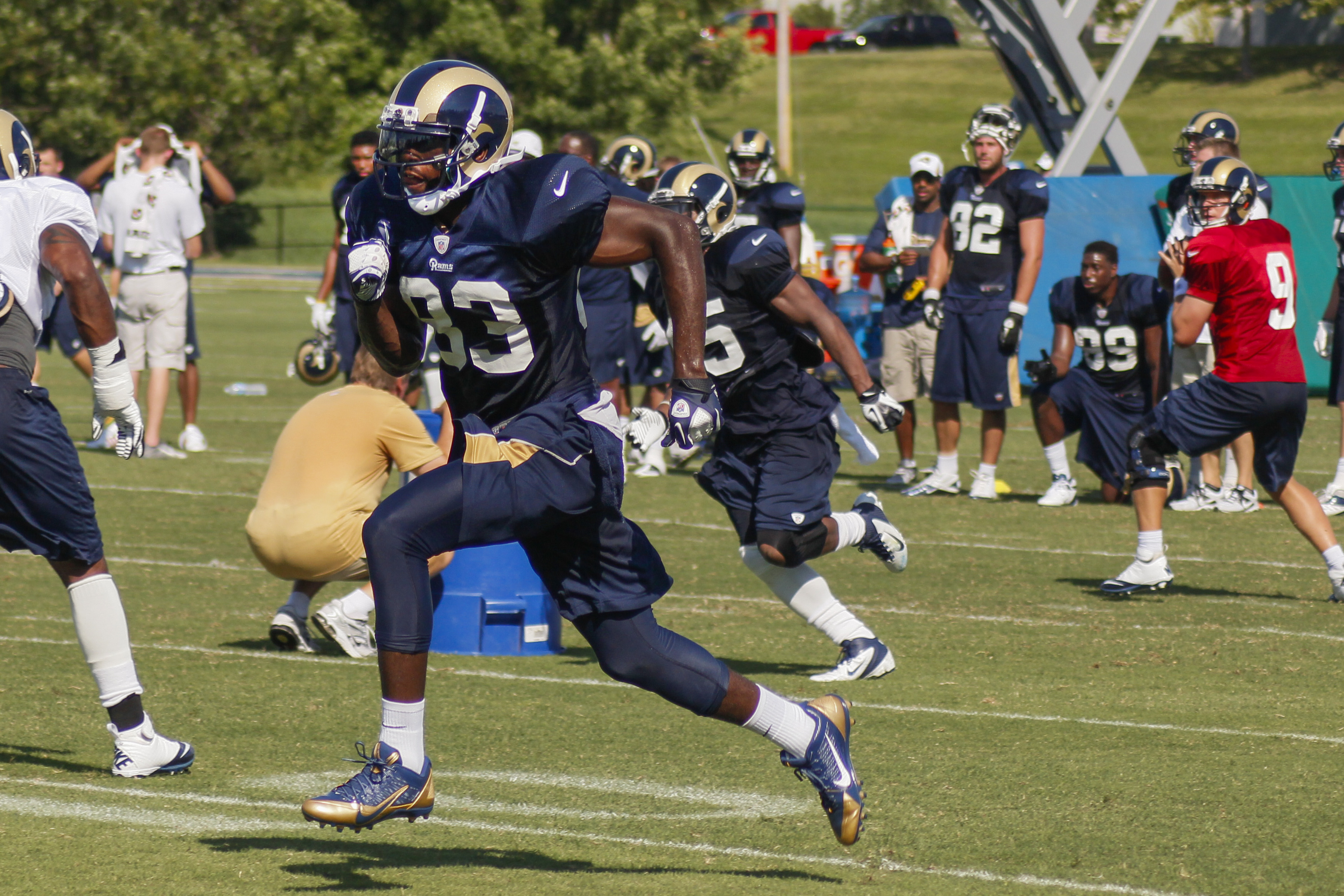
Quick participating in the 2013 St. Louis Rams training camp.

At the 2012 NFL Draft, Quick was selected in the second round, (33rd overall) by the St. Louis Rams. He is the highest draft pick ever out of Appalachian State. In his rookie season, Quick got most of his playing time off the bench, appearing in 15 games. By the conclusion of the season, he recorded 11 receptions for 156 yards and 2 touchdowns. On October 26, 2014, Quick sustained a torn Rotator cuff against the Kansas City Chiefs. On the season, Quick finished with 25 receptions on 39 targets for 375 yards and three touchdowns.

On September 25, 2016, Quick became the first Los Angeles Ram to score a touchdown since Jermaine Ross on December 24, 1994, before the Rams' 20-year stay in St. Louis. On October 2, 2016, Quick scored on a 65-yard touchdown as well as the winning 4-yard touchdown with less than 3 minutes to go against the Arizona Cardinals.

=== Washington Redskins ===
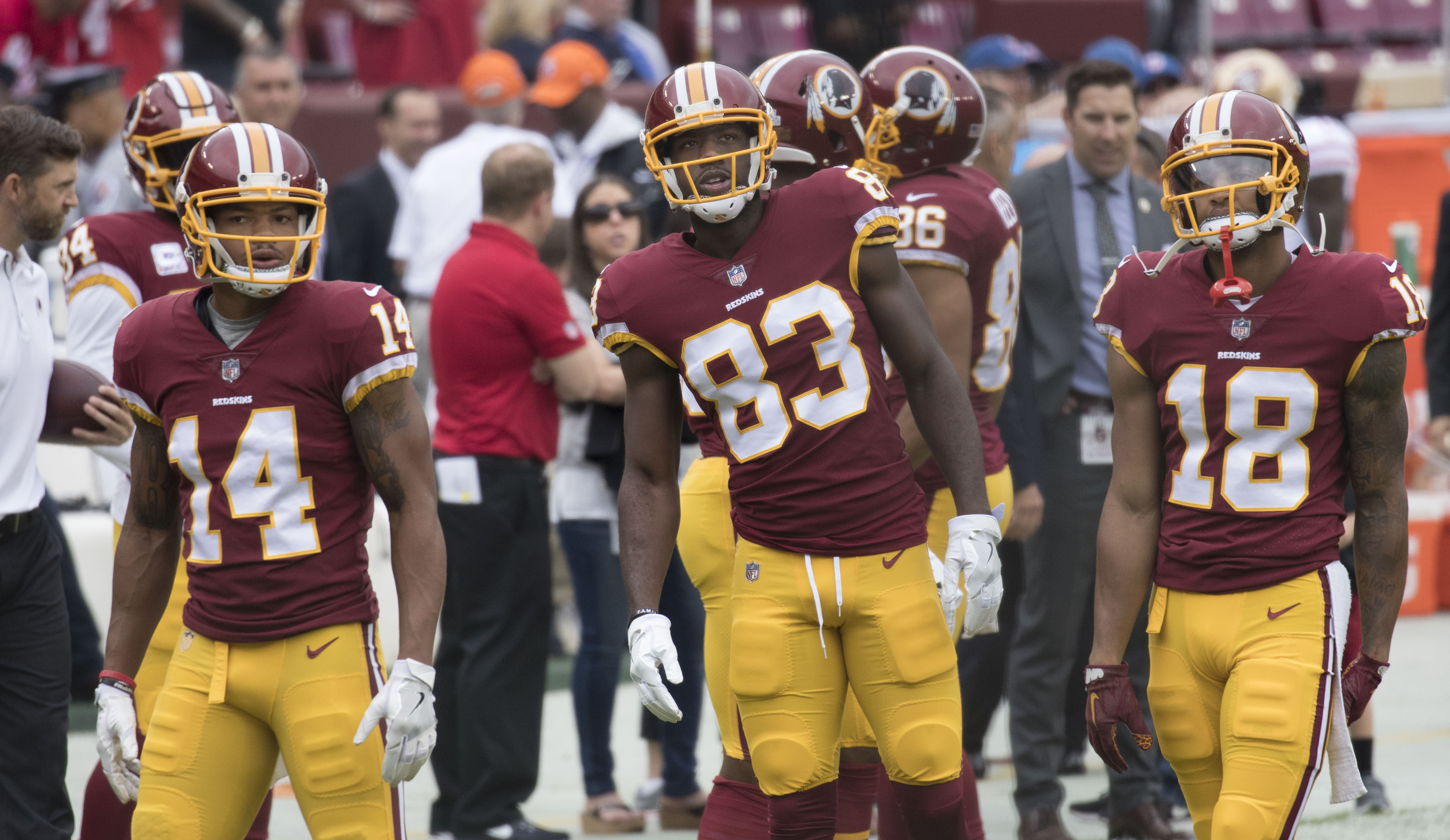
Quick (83) standing with Ryan Grant (14) and Josh Doctson (18)

On March 24, 2017, Quick signed a one-year contract with the Washington Redskins. On March 14, 2018, Quick re-signed with them, but was released prior to the regular season on September 1, 2018. He re-signed with the team on September 11, following a season ending injury to Cam Sims. He was waived again on November 17, 2018, when Byron Marshall was activated from injured reserve.

The Redskins re-signed Quick for a third time on March 18, 2019. He was waived during final roster cuts on August 31, 2019.
