= 2017 Los Angeles Rams season =

81st season in franchise history, first playoff berth since 2004

- Owner: Stan Kroenke
- General manager: Les Snead
- Head coach: Sean McVay
- Offensive coordinator: Matt LaFleur
- Defensive coordinator: Wade Phillips
- Home stadium: Los Angeles Memorial Coliseum

Results
- Record: 11–5
- Division place: 1st NFC West
- Playoffs: Lost Wild Card Playoffs (vs. Falcons) 13–26
- All-Pros: 7: RB Todd Gurley (1st team); LT Andrew Whitworth (1st team); DT Aaron Donald (1st team); K Greg Zuerlein (1st team); P Johnny Hekker (1st team); KR Pharoh Cooper (1st team); LG Rodger Saffold (2nd team); PR Pharoh Cooper (2nd team)
- Pro Bowlers: 8: QB Jared Goff; RB Todd Gurley; T Andrew Whitworth; DT Aaron Donald; K Greg Zuerlein; P Johnny Hekker; RS Pharoh Cooper; LS Jake McQuaide

The 2017 season was the Los Angeles Rams' 80th in the National Football League (NFL), their 81st overall, 51st in the Greater Los Angeles Area and their first under head coach Sean McVay. The Rams dramatically improved on their 4–12 record from the previous season. With a win over the Arizona Cardinals, the Rams ended a decade-long drought and clinched their first winning season since 2003 and first playoff appearance since 2004, when the club was based in St. Louis. The team played a game in London, England at Twickenham Stadium against the Cardinals in Week 7 as one of the NFL London Games.

For the second consecutive year, the Rams started out in first place in the NFC West with a 3–1 record. Los Angeles Rams also scored 107 points in the first three games of the season, the second highest in franchise history and a league leader. Furthermore, the team went from being dead last in total offense the previous season with an NFL-low 224 points to becoming the highest scoring team in the league in 2017 with an average of 29.9 points per game and 478 total points scored - tops in both categories. On Christmas Eve, the Rams defeated the Tennessee Titans 27–23 in a Super Bowl XXXIV rematch to clinch the NFC West for the first time since 2003 and their first playoff berth since 2004. This was also their first playoff appearance as the Los Angeles Rams since the 1989 season and their first division title as the Los Angeles Rams since the 1985 season. Their promising season came to an end as they were defeated at home by the No. 6 seed and defending NFC Champion Atlanta Falcons, 26–13 in the Wild Card Round. Coincidentally in the Rams' last playoff game in 2005, they were also beaten by the Falcons, which was the first time since 2003 that the Rams went one-and-done and their first Wild Card playoff loss since 2000. In the offseason, the Rams introduced a new logo, with the horns and the ram's outline turning white. It would be their logo for three years.

The 2017 season marked the beginning of a more successful era for the franchise. After the team missed the playoffs every year from 2005 to 2016, the Rams have experienced a vast upswing in their fortunes, becoming consistent playoff contenders under McVay's leadership. Since McVay's first season in 2017, the Rams have qualified for the playoffs seven times in nine seasons, appeared in two Super Bowls, winning Super Bowl LVI, and have had only one losing season. They have had a nine-year aggregate record of 92-57 (.617) from 2017 to 2025, the fifth-best in the NFL during that span.

== Offseason ==
=== Coaching changes ===
On January 12, the Rams hired Sean McVay as the team's new head coach. Interim head coach John Fassel, who had replaced Jeff Fisher following Fisher's firing in Week 12 of 2016 and also interviewed for the head coach position, was retained as special teams coordinator along with running backs coach Skip Peete and assistant offensive line coach Andy Dickerson.

On January 19, Wade Phillips was announced as the team's new defensive coordinator.

On February 8, the Rams hired Matt LaFleur as the new offensive coordinator.

=== Uniform changes ===
The Rams underwent a moderate uniform change, removing New Century gold from their helmets and pants while leaving their jerseys unchanged. The Rams allowed their fans to decide on which pants stripes and facemask color they wanted the team to use via polls on their social media pages, with a single navy stripe on each pant leg and white facemask winning. Additionally, the Rams wore navy pants with a single white stripe for some away games.

=== Draft ===
2017 Los Angeles Rams draft
Round	Pick	Player	Position	College	Notes
2	44	Gerald Everett	TE	South Alabama	
3	69	Cooper Kupp *	WR	Eastern Washington	
3	91	John Johnson III	S	Boston College	
4	117	Josh Reynolds	WR	Texas A&M	
4	125	Samson Ebukam	LB	Eastern Washington	
6	189	Tanzel Smart	DT	Tulane	
6	206	Sam Rogers	FB	Virginia Tech	
7	234	Ejuan Price	DE	Pittsburgh	
Made roster † Pro Football Hall of Fame * Made at least one Pro Bowl during career

Notes

- The Rams traded their 2017 first-round selection (No. 5 overall), a 2017 third-round compensatory selection (No. 100 overall), along with their 2016 first-, two-second– and third-round selections to the Tennessee Titans in exchange for the Titans' 2016 first-, fourth- and sixth round selections.
- The Rams were awarded an additional compensatory selection – No. 141 overall.

=== Undrafted free agents ===
2017 Los Angeles Rams Undrafted Free Agents
Position	Player	College	Notes
RB	Justin Davis	USC	
NT	Omarious Bryant	Western Kentucky	
RB	Lenard Tillery	Southern University	
TE	Johnny Mundt	Oregon	

== Staff ==
2017 Los Angeles Rams staff
Front office: Owner/chairman – Stan Kroenke; Executive vice president of football operations/coo – Kevin Demoff; General manager – Les Snead; Senior personnel executive – Brian Xanders; Senior personnel advisor – Taylor Morton; Director of college scouting – Brad Holmes; Assistant director of college scouting – Ted Monago; Director of draft management – J. W. Jordan; Director of pro personnel – Ray Agnew; Senior assistant to general manager – James Gladstone; Head coaches: Head coach – Sean McVay; Assistant head coach/linebackers – Joe Barry; Assistant to the head coach – Bill Nayes; Offensive coaches: Offensive coordinator – Matt LaFleur; Quarterbacks – Greg Olson; Running backs – Skip Peete; Wide receivers – Eric Yarber; Assistant wide receivers – Zac Taylor; Tight ends – Shane Waldron; Offensive line – Aaron Kromer; Assistant offensive line – Andy Dickerson; Offensive assistant – Zak Kromer	Defensive coaches: Defensive coordinator – Wade Phillips; Defensive line – Bill Johnson; Assistant linebackers – Chris Shula; Cornerbacks – Aubrey Pleasant; Safeties – Ejiro Evero; Defensive quality control – Thad Bogardus; Special teams coaches: Special teams coordinator – John Fassel; Assistant special teams – Tyrone McKenzie; Strength and conditioning: Strength and conditioning – Ted Rath; Assistant strength and conditioning – Edward Grayer; Assistant strength and conditioning – Blair Wagner; Strength assistant – Fernando Noriega

== Rosters ==
=== Opening training camp ===
2017 Los Angeles Rams Opening training camp roster
Quarterbacks (QB): 16 Jared Goff; 14 Sean Mannion; 8 Dan Orlovsky; Running backs (RB): 34 Malcolm Brown; 42 Justin Davis ^{UR}; 25 Lance Dunbar; 36 Aaron Green; 30 Todd Gurley; 45 Zach Laskey FB; 37 De'Mard Llorens ^{UR}; 39 Sam Rogers FB ^{R}; 41 Lenard Tillery ^{UR}; Wide receivers (WR): 11 Tavon Austin PR; 10 Pharoh Cooper KR; 18 Cooper Kupp ^{R}; 15 Bradley Marquez; 19 Paul McRoberts; 83 Josh Reynolds ^{R}; 12 Shakeir Ryan ^{UR}; 82 Brandon Shippen; 86 Nelson Spruce; 88 Mike Thomas; 17 Robert Woods; Tight ends (TE): 81 Gerald Everett ^{R}; 46 Cory Harkey; 84 Temarrick Hemingway; 89 Tyler Higbee; 48 Johnny Mundt ^{UR}; 87 Travis Wilson	Offensive linemen (OL): 66 Austin Blythe C; 68 Jamon Brown G; 61 Parker Collins G; 64 Andrew Donnal T; 73 Michael Dunn T ^{UR}; 60 Jake Eldrenkamp G ^{UR}; 79 Rob Havenstein G; 70 Alex Kozan G ^{UR}; 72 Pace Murphy T; 76 Rodger Saffold G; 61 John Sullivan C; 69 Cody Wichmann G; 63 Darrell Williams T; 77 Andrew Whitworth T; Defensive linemen (DL): 90 Michael Brockers NT; 67 Omarius Bryant NT ^{UR}; 99 Aaron Donald DE; 91 Dominique Easley DE; 66 A. J. Jefferson DE ^{UR}; 71 Caushaud Lyons DE; 95 Mike Purcell NT; 70 Casey Sayles DE ^{UR}; 92 Tanzel Smart DE ^{R}; 62 Louis Trinca-Pasat DE; 93 Ethan Westbrooks DE	Linebackers (LB): 26 Mark Barron ILB; 98 Connor Barwin OLB; 60 Kevin Davis ILB ^{UR}; 50 Samson Ebukam OLB ^{R}; 59 Josh Forrest ILB; 97 Morgan Fox OLB; 55 Nicholas Grigsby ILB; 54 Bryce Hager ILB; 58 Cory Littleton ILB; 96 Matt Longacre OLB; 57 Cassanova McKinzy ILB; 49 Andy Mulumba OLB; 52 Alec Ogletree ILB; 56 Folarin Orimolade ILB; 51 Ejuan Price OLB ^{R}; 94 Robert Quinn OLB; 53 Carlos Thompson OLB; Defensive backs (DB): 31 Maurice Alexander SS; 41 Marqui Christian SS; 24 Blake Countess CB; 38 Cody Davis FS; 36 Dominique Hatfield CB; 33 E.J. Gaines CB; 32 Troy Hill CB; 27 Isaiah Johnson SS; 43 John Johnson FS ^{R}; 22 Trumaine Johnson CB; 35 Michael Jordan CB; 20 Lamarcus Joyner FS; 34 Aarion Penton CB; 47 Kevin Peterson CB; 23 Nickell Robey-Coleman CB; 21 Kayvon Webster CB; Special teams (ST): 6 Johnny Hekker P; 44 Jake McQuaide LS; 4 Greg Zuerlein K	Reserve: Currently empty; Rookies in italics 90 active, 0 reserve

=== Final ===
2017 Los Angeles Rams roster
Quarterbacks (QB): 16 Jared Goff; 14 Sean Mannion; Running backs (RB): 34 Malcolm Brown; 33 Justin Davis; 25 Lance Dunbar; 30 Todd Gurley; Wide receivers (WR): 11 Tavon Austin; 10 Pharoh Cooper; 18 Cooper Kupp; 83 Josh Reynolds; 88 Mike Thomas; 12 Sammy Watkins; 17 Robert Woods; Tight ends (TE): 86 Derek Carrier; 81 Gerald Everett; 89 Tyler Higbee	Offensive linemen (OL): 66 Austin Blythe G; 68 Jamon Brown G; 79 Rob Havenstein T; 73 Cornelius Lucas T; 72 Aaron Neary C; 76 Rodger Saffold G; 65 John Sullivan C; 63 Darrell Williams T; 77 Andrew Whitworth T; Defensive linemen (DL): 90 Michael Brockers DE; 99 Aaron Donald DE; 97 Morgan Fox DE; 92 Tanzel Smart NT; 95 Tyrunn Walker NT; 93 Ethan Westbrooks NT	Linebackers (LB): 26 Mark Barron ILB; 98 Connor Barwin OLB; 50 Samson Ebukam OLB; 54 Bryce Hager ILB; 58 Cory Littleton ILB; 55 Cameron Lynch ILB; 52 Alec Ogletree ILB; 94 Robert Quinn OLB; 56 Garrett Sickels OLB; 53 Carlos Thompson OLB; Defensive backs (DB): 24 Blake Countess S; 38 Cody Davis FS; 32 Troy Hill CB; 27 Isaiah Johnson SS; 43 John Johnson SS; 22 Trumaine Johnson CB; 20 Lamarcus Joyner FS; 47 Kevin Peterson CB; 23 Nickell Robey-Coleman CB; Special teams (ST): 6 Johnny Hekker P; 44 Jake McQuaide LS; 5 Sam Ficken K	Practice squad: 13 Fred Brown WR; 67 Omarius Bryant NT; 60 Jake Eldrenkamp C; 36 Dominique Hatfield CB; 87 Henry Krieger-Coble TE; 82 Johnny Mundt TE; 31 Taurean Nixon CB; 51 Ejuan Price OLB; 39 Sam Rogers FB; 35 Marcus Sayles CB; Reserve: 8 Brandon Allen QB (IR); 41 Marqui Christian FS (IR); 91 Dominique Easley OLB (IR); 84 Temarrick Hemingway TE (IR); 45 Zach Laskey FB (IR); 96 Matt Longacre OLB (IR); -- Lenard Tillery RB (IR); 21 Kayvon Webster CB (IR); 4 Greg Zuerlein K (IR); Rookies in italics 53 active, 9 reserve, 10 practice squad

== Preseason ==
The Rams' preliminary preseason schedule was announced on April 10.

Week	Date	Opponent	Result	Record	Venue	Recap
1	August 12	Dallas Cowboys	W 13–10	1–0	Los Angeles Memorial Coliseum	Recap
2	August 19	at Oakland Raiders	W 24–21	2–0	Oakland–Alameda County Coliseum	Recap
3	August 26	Los Angeles Chargers	L 19–21	2–1	Los Angeles Memorial Coliseum	Recap
4	August 31	at Green Bay Packers	L 10–24	2–2	Lambeau Field	Recap

== Regular season ==
=== Schedule ===
The Rams' regular season schedule was announced on April 20.

Week	Date	Opponent	Result	Record	Venue	Recap
1	September 10	Indianapolis Colts	**W** 46–9	1–0	Los Angeles Memorial Coliseum	Recap
2	September 17	Washington Redskins	**L** 20–27	1–1	Los Angeles Memorial Coliseum	Recap
3	September 21	at **San Francisco 49ers**	**W** 41–39	2–1	Levi's Stadium	Recap
4	October 1	at Dallas Cowboys	**W** 35–30	3–1	AT&T Stadium	Recap
5	October 8	**Seattle Seahawks**	**L** 10–16	3–2	Los Angeles Memorial Coliseum	Recap
6	October 15	at Jacksonville Jaguars	**W** 27–17	4–2	EverBank Field	Recap
7	October 22	**Arizona Cardinals**	**W** 33–0	5–2	(United Kingdom) Twickenham Stadium (London)	Recap
8	Bye					
9	November 5	at New York Giants	**W** 51–17	6–2	MetLife Stadium	Recap
10	November 12	Houston Texans	**W** 33–7	7–2	Los Angeles Memorial Coliseum	Recap
11	November 19	at Minnesota Vikings	**L** 7–24	7–3	U.S. Bank Stadium	Recap
12	November 26	New Orleans Saints	**W** 26–20	8–3	Los Angeles Memorial Coliseum	Recap
13	December 3	at **Arizona Cardinals**	**W** 32–16	9–3	University of Phoenix Stadium	Recap
14	December 10	Philadelphia Eagles	**L** 35–43	9–4	Los Angeles Memorial Coliseum	Recap
15	December 17	at **Seattle Seahawks**	**W** 42–7	10–4	CenturyLink Field	Recap
16	December 24	at Tennessee Titans	**W** 27–23	11–4	Nissan Stadium	Recap
17	December 31	**San Francisco 49ers**	**L** 13–34	11–5	Los Angeles Memorial Coliseum	Recap

Note: Intra-division opponents are in bold text.

=== Game summaries ===
==== Week 1: vs. Indianapolis Colts ====
Week One: Indianapolis Colts at Los Angeles Rams – Game summary

Quarter	1	2	3	4	Total
Colts	3	0	0	6	**9**
**Rams**	10	17	10	9	**46**

at Los Angeles Memorial Coliseum, Los Angeles, California

- Date: September 10
- Game time: 1:05 p.m. PDT
- Game weather: 90 °F (32 °C), sunny
- Game attendance: 60,128
- Referee: Ronald Torbert
- TV announcers (CBS): Ian Eagle, Dan Fouts and Evan Washburn
- Recap, Gamebook

Game information

**First quarter**

- LAR – Greg Zuerlein 50-yard field goal, 12:48. Rams 3–0. **Drive: 7 plays, 43 yards, 2:17.**
- LAR – Trumaine Johnson 39-yard interception return (Greg Zuerlein kick), 11:10. Rams 10–0. **Drive: 0 plays, 39 yards, 0:00.**
- IND – Adam Vinatieri 20-yard field goal, 6:25. Rams 10–3. **Drive: 9 plays, 73 yards, 4:49.**

**Second quarter**

- LAR – Todd Gurley 5-yard run (Greg Zuerlein kick), 9:44. Rams 17–3. **Drive: 5 plays, 69 yards, 2:12.**
- LAR – Cooper Kupp 18-yard pass from Jared Goff (Greg Zuerlein kick), 5:27. Rams 24–3. **Drive: 6 plays, 58 yards, 2:09.**
- LAR – Greg Zuerlein 35-yard field goal, 0:22. Rams 27–3. **Drive: 6 plays, 43 yards, 2:51.**

**Third quarter**

- LAR – Greg Zuerlein 44-yard field goal, 7:28. Rams 30–3. **Drive: 8 plays, 46 yards, 4:40.**
- LAR – Lamarcus Joyner 29-yard interception return (Greg Zuerlein kick), 7:23. Rams 37–3. **Drive: 0 plays, 29 yards, 0:00.**

**Fourth quarter**

- IND – Marlon Mack 3-yard run (kick failed), 11:36. Rams 37–9. **Drive: 5 plays, 84 yards, 2:41.**
- LAR – Jacoby Brissett tackled in the end zone by Morgan Fox for a safety, 9:29. Rams 39–9.
- LAR – Malcolm Brown 3-yard run (Greg Zuerlein kick), 4:33. Rams 46–9. **Drive: 8 plays, 57 yards, 4:50.**

**Top passers**

- IND – Scott Tolzien – 9/18, 128 yards, 2 INT
- LAR – Jared Goff – 21/29, 306 yards, 1 TD

**Top rushers**

- IND – Frank Gore – 10 rushes, 42 yards
- LAR – Todd Gurley – 19 rushes, 40 yards, TD

**Top receivers**

- IND – T. Y. Hilton – 3 receptions, 57 yards
- LAR – Cooper Kupp – 4 receptions, 76 yards, TD

**Top tacklers**

- IND –
- LAR –

The Rams started their season with a blowout win over the Colts as second-year quarterback Jared Goff got both his first victory and the first 300-yard passing game of his career, including a touchdown pass to rookie wide receiver Cooper Kupp. Cornerback Trumaine Johnson was named NFC Defensive Player of the Week after returning an interception 39 yards for the Rams' first touchdown of the season, while also recording two tackles including a forced fumble and a fumble recovery. Safety Lamarcus Joyner also returned an interception for a touchdown and added four tackles. Defensive end Michael Brockers had five tackles to lead the defense, which had four sacks and forced three turnovers as Sean McVay became the youngest head coach ever (31 years, 7 months, 2 weeks, 3 days) to win in his NFL debut.

==== Week 2: vs. Washington Redskins ====
Week Two: Washington Redskins at Los Angeles Rams – Game summary

Quarter	1	2	3	4	Total
**Redskins**	3	17	0	7	**27**
Rams	0	10	7	3	**20**

at Los Angeles Memorial Coliseum, Los Angeles, California

- Date: September 17
- Game time: 1:25 pm. PDT
- Game weather: 76 °F (24 °C), partly cloudy
- Game attendance: 56,612
- Referee: Jerome Boger
- TV announcers (Fox): Thom Brennaman, Chris Spielman and Peter Schrager
- Recap, Gamebook

Game information

**First quarter**

- WAS – Dustin Hopkins 41-yard field goal, 4:43. Redskins 3–0. **Drive: 14 plays, 57 yards, 7:24.**

**Second quarter**

- WAS – Chris Thompson 7-yard run (Dustin Hopkins kick), 14:54. Redskins 10–0. **Drive: 6 plays, 65 yards, 3:18.**
- WAS – Dustin Hopkins 22-yard field goal, 12:06. Redskins 13–0. **Drive: 7 plays, 26 yards, 2:33.**
- LAR – Todd Gurley 1-yard run (Greg Zuerlein kick), 9:59. Redskins 13–7. **Drive: 4 plays, 75 yards, 2:07.**
- LAR – Greg Zuerlein 32-yard field goal, 3:03. Redskins 13–10. **Drive: 9 plays, 54 yards, 4:12.**
- WAS – Chris Thompson 61-yard run (Dustin Hopkins kick), 1:44. Redskins 20–10. **Drive: 4 plays, 17 yards, 1:19.**

**Third quarter**

- LAR – Todd Gurley 18-yard pass from Jared Goff (Greg Zuerlein kick), 8:43. Redskins 20–17. **Drive: 6 plays, 93 yards, 3:26.**

**Fourth quarter**

- LAR – Greg Zuerlein 40-yard field goal, 7:16. Tied 20–20. **Drive: 14 plays, 53 yards, 7:22.**
- WAS – Ryan Grant 11-yard pass from Kirk Cousins (Dustin Hopkins kick), 1:49. Redskins 27–20. **Drive: 10 plays, 70 yards, 5:27.**

**Top passers**

- WAS – Kirk Cousins – 18/27, 179 yards, TD
- LAR – Jared Goff – 14/24, 219 yards, TD, INT

**Top rushers**

- WAS – Robert Kelley – 12 rushes, 78 yards
- LAR – Todd Gurley – 16 rushes, 88 yards, TD

**Top receivers**

- WAS – Jordan Reed – 6 receptions, 48 yards
- LAR – Gerald Everett – 3 receptions, 95 yards

**Top tacklers**

- WAS – Zach Brown – 8 tackles, 2 assisted
- LAR – Alec Ogletree – 7 tackles, 4 assisted

Facing his former team, Sean McVay was dealt his first career defeat as the Rams fell behind 13–0. Running back Todd Gurley had 132 yards in total offense and two scores, including the first receiving touchdown of his career on an 18-yard pass from Goff in which he hurdled Redskins cornerback Bashaud Breeland on his way to the end zone. Rookie tight end Gerald Everett turned in a strong performance with three receptions for 95 yards, while linebacker Alec Ogletree had 11 tackles including a sack on defense.

==== Week 3: at San Francisco 49ers ====
Week Three: Los Angeles Rams at San Francisco 49ers – Game summary

Quarter	1	2	3	4	Total
**Rams**	14	10	10	7	**41**
49ers	7	6	7	19	**39**

at Levi's Stadium, Santa Clara, California

- Date: September 21
- Game time: 5:25 pm. PDT
- Game weather: 68 °F (20 °C), mostly sunny
- Game attendance: 70,178
- Referee: Jeff Triplette
- TV announcers (NFLN/KNBC): Mike Tirico, Cris Collinsworth and Heather Cox
- Recap, Gamebook

Game information

**First quarter**

- LAR – Todd Gurley 3-yard run (Greg Zuerlein kick), 0:03. Rams 7–0. **Drive: 1 play, 3 yards,14:52.**
- SF – Brian Hoyer 2-yard run (Robbie Gould kick), 6:31. Tied 7–7. **Drive: 7 plays, 81 yards, 8:26.**
- LAR – Todd Gurley 7-yard pass from Jared Goff (Greg Zuerlein kick), 3:45.Rams 14–7. **Drive: 1 play, 8 yards,4:37.**

**Second quarter**

- LAR – Greg Zuerlein 48-yard field goal, 3:10. Rams 17–7. **Drive: 7 plays, 38 yards, 15:00.**
- SF – Robbie Gould 36-yard field goal, 1:58. Rams 17–10. **Drive: 4 plays, -6 yards, 9:42.**
- SF – Robbie Gould 48-yard field goal, 4:44. Rams 17–13. **Drive: 8 plays, 47 yards, 3:51.**
- LAR – Todd Gurley 2-yard run (Greg Zuerlein kick), 2:57. Rams 24–13. **Drive: 9 play, 75 yards, 0:55.**

**Third quarter**

- LAR – Greg Zuerlein 19-yard field goal, 5:43. Rams 27–13. **Drive: 10 plays, 74 yards, 9:20.**
- SF – Carlos Hyde 3-yard run (Robbie Gould kick), 3:37. Rams 27–20. **Drive: 10 plays, 75 yards, 5:44.**
- LAR – Sammy Watkins 1-yard pass from Jared Goff (Greg Zuerlein kick), 5:23. 'Rams 34–20. **Drive: 10 plays, 8 yards, 0:21.**

**Fourth quarter**

- SF – Garrett Celek 1-yard pass from Brian Hoyer (kick failed) 5:30. Rams 34–26. **Drive: 10 plays, 75 yards, 12:57.**
- LAR – Sammy Watkins 12-yard pass from Jared Goff (Greg Zuerlein kick), 4:07. Rams 41–26. **Drive: 7 plays, 8 yards, 8:47.**
- SF – Trent Taylor 1-yard pass from Brian Hoyer (Robbie Gould kick), 1:27. Rams 41–33. **Drive: 4 plays, 64 yards, 5:12.**
- SF – Carlos Hyde 1-yard run (pass failed) 2:40. Rams 41–39. **Drive: 8 plays, 71 yards, 2:17.**

**Top passers**

- SF – Brian Hoyer – 23/37, 332 yards, 2 TD, INT
- LAR – Jared Goff – 22/28, 288 yards, 3 TD

**Top rushers**

- SF – Carlos Hyde – 25 rushes, 84 yards, 2 TD
- LAR – Todd Gurley – 28 rushes, 113 yards, 2 TD

**Top receivers**

- SF – Pierre Garcon – 7 receptions, 142 yards
- LAR – Robert Woods – 6 receptions, 108 yards

**Top tacklers**

- SF – Jimmie Ward – 7 solo tackles
- LAR – Alec Ogletree – 7 solo tackles, 2 assisted

In their first NFC West matchup of the season, the Rams came out ahead of a high-scoring battle with the rival 49ers on Thursday Night Football. With friends and family in attendance, Jared Goff (a Bay Area native) completed 22 of 28 passes for 288 yards and three touchdowns, two to wide receiver Sammy Watkins. Both Watkins and fellow wideout Robert Woods surpassed 100 yards receiving on six receptions each. Todd Gurley caught one touchdown and ran for two more (his first three-TD effort in the NFL) to go along with his 149 yards in total offense. Cornerback Nickell Robey-Coleman had an interception, a fumble recovery and five tackles to lead the Rams defense. As this was an NFL Color Rush game, the Rams went with all-yellow uniforms for the first time since their final home game in St. Louis in 2015, which offset the host 49ers' all-black scheme.

==== Week 4: at Dallas Cowboys ====
Week Four: Los Angeles Rams at Dallas Cowboys – Game summary

Quarter	1	2	3	4	Total
**Rams**	3	13	10	9	**35**
Cowboys	3	21	0	6	**30**

at AT&T Stadium, Arlington, Texas

- Date: October 1
- Game time: 10:00 am. PDT/12:00 p.m. CDT
- Game weather: Played indoors (retractable roof closed)
- Game attendance: 91,869
- Referee: Clete Blakeman
- TV announcers (Fox): Chris Myers, Daryl Johnston and Laura Okmin
- Recap, Gamebook

Game information

**First quarter**

- DAL – Dan Bailey 34-yard field goal, 11:30. Cowboys 3–0. **Drive: 7 plays, 64 yards, 3:30.**
- LAR – Greg Zuerlein 49-yard field goal, 7:07. Tied 3–3. **Drive: 9 plays, 53 yards, 4:23.**

**Second quarter**

- DAL – Ezekiel Elliott 10-yard pass from Dak Prescott (Dan Bailey kick), 14:05. Cowboys 10–3. **Drive: 15 plays, 81 yards, 8:02.**
- LAR – Greg Zuerlein 44-yard field goal, 12:39. Cowboys 10–6. **Drive: 5 plays, 9 yards, 1:26.**
- DAL – Ezekiel Elliot 1-yard run (Dan Bailey kick), 10:53. Cowboys 17–6. **Drive: 4 plays, 75 yards, 1:46.**
- LAR – Cooper Kupp 7-yard pass from Jared Goff (Greg Zuerlein kick), 6:33. Cowboys 17–13. **Drive: 5 plays, 18 yards, 1:56.**
- DAL – Brice Butler 10-yard pass from Dak Prescott (Dan Bailey kick), 1:51. Cowboys 24–13. **Drive: 9 plays, 75 yards, 4:42.**
- LAR – Greg Zuerlein 44-yard field goal, 0:00. Cowboys 24–16. **Drive: 8 plays, 49 yards, 1:51.**

**Third quarter**

- LAR – Greg Zuerlein 30-yard field goal, 7:26. Cowboys 24–19. **Drive: 8 plays 54 yards, 3:15.**
- LAR – Todd Gurley 53-yard pass from Jared Goff (Greg Zuerlein kick), 2:59. Rams 26–24. **Drive: 4 plays, 90 yards, 1:59.**

**Fourth quarter**

- LAR – Greg Zuerlein 28-yard field goal, 11:56. Rams 29–24. **Drive: 11 plays, 78 yards, 4:26.**
- LAR – Greg Zuerlein 43-yard field goal, 9:41. Rams 32–24. **Drive: 4 plays, 4 yards, 1:19.**
- DAL – James Hanna 28-yard pass from Dak Prescott (pass failed), 7:11. Rams 32–30. **Drive: 5 plays, 75 yards, 2:30.**
- LAR – Greg Zuerlein 33-yard field goal, 1:55. Rams 35–30. **Drive: 12 plays, 68 yards, 5:16.**

**Top passers**

- LAR – Jared Goff – 21/36, 255 yards, 2 TD,
- DAL – Dak Prescott – 20/36, 252 yards, 3 TD, INT

**Top rushers**

- LAR – Todd Gurley – 23 rushes, 121 yards
- DAL – Ezekiel Elliott – 21 rushes, 85 yards, TD

**Top receivers**

- LAR – Todd Gurley – 7 receptions, 94 yards, TD
- DAL – Dez Bryant – 5 receptions, 98 yards

**Top tacklers**

- LAR – Mark Barron – 8 tackles
- DAL – Jaylon Smith – 10 tackles

Kicker Greg Zuerlein hit a team-record seven field goals and Todd Gurley totaled 215 offensive yards (121 rushing, 94 receiving) along with a spectacular 53-yard touchdown on a screen pass as the Rams defeated the favored Cowboys on the road. Both earned NFC Player of the Week honors for Special Teams and Offense, respectively. Linebacker Mark Barron's eight tackles and an interception led the Rams defense. Because the Cowboys wore their white uniforms at home, the Rams wore their Millennium Blue uniforms with blue pants, which clashed terribly with their blue and white helmets. The Rams' uniform choice was widely derided by pro football pundits and on social media.

==== Week 5: vs. Seattle Seahawks ====
Week Five: Seattle Seahawks at Los Angeles Rams – Game summary

Quarter	1	2	3	4	Total
**Seahawks**	0	10	3	3	**16**
Rams	0	10	0	0	**10**

at Los Angeles Memorial Coliseum, Los Angeles, California

- Date: October 8
- Game time: 1:05 pm. PDT
- Game weather: 78 °F (26 °C), sunny
- Game attendance: 60,745
- Referee: Gene Steratore
- TV announcers (CBS): Spero Dedes and Adam Archuleta
- Recap, Gamebook

Game information

**First quarter**

- No scoring plays

**Second quarter**

- LAR – Tavon Austin 27-yard run (Greg Zuerlein kick), 14:13. Rams 7–0. **Drive: 10 plays, 79 yards, 3:57.**
- LAR – Greg Zuerlein 35-yard field goal, 9:29. Rams 10–0. **Drive: 4 plays, 2 yards, 0:56.**
- SEA – Jimmy Graham 4-yard pass from Russell Wilson (Blair Walsh kick), 1:55. Rams 10–7. **Drive: 15 plays, 75 yards, 7:34.**
- SEA – Blair Walsh 48-yard field goal, 0:00. Tied 10–10. **Drive: 9 plays, 46 yards, 1:28.**

**Third quarter**

- SEA – Blair Walsh 49-yard field goal, 5:41. Seahawks 13–10. **Drive: 9 plays, 43 yards, 4:13.**

**Fourth quarter**

- SEA – Blair Walsh 35-yard field goal, 1:09. Seahawks 16–10. **Drive: 4 plays, 3 yards, 1:37.**

**Top passers**

- SEA – Russell Wilson – 24/37, 198 yards, TD, INT
- LAR – Jared Goff – 22/47, 288 yards, 2 INT

**Top rushers**

- SEA – Thomas Rawls – 8 rushes, 20 yards
- LAR – Todd Gurley – 14 rushes, 43 yards

**Top receivers**

- SEA – Jimmy Graham – 6 receptions, 37 yards, TD
- LAR – Tyler Higbee – 4 receptions, 98 yards

**Top tacklers**

- SEA – Bobby Wagner – 8 solo tackles, 3 assisted
- LAR – Mark Barron – 12 solo tackles, 3 assisted

The Rams staked out a 10–0 lead in the second quarter, but were undone by two interceptions and three lost fumbles in losing to the visiting Seahawks. Wide receiver Tavon Austin scored the Rams' only touchdown on a 27-yard run in the second quarter. Starting with just over a minute left in the fourth quarter, Jared Goff drove the Rams 55 yards to the Seattle 20-yard line and just missed connecting with Cooper Kupp in the end zone for a potential game-winner in the final seconds. On defense, rookie strong safety John Johnson got his first career interception and returned it 69 yards while Mark Barron had 15 tackles.

==== Week 6: at Jacksonville Jaguars ====
Week Six: Los Angeles Rams at Jacksonville Jaguars – Game summary

Quarter	1	2	3	4	Total
**Rams**	17	7	0	3	**27**
Jaguars	14	0	3	0	**17**

at EverBank Field, Jacksonville, Florida

- Date: October 15
- Game time: 1:05 pm. PDT/4:05 p.m. EDT
- Game weather: 88 °F (31 °C), partly sunny with 30% chance of rain
- Game attendance: 56,232
- Referee: Walt Coleman
- TV announcers (Fox): Dick Stockton, Mark Schlereth and Shannon Spake
- Recap, Gamebook

Game information

**First quarter**

- LAR – Pharoh Cooper 103-yard kickoff return (Greg Zuerlein kick), 14:46. Rams 7–0. **Drive: 0 plays, 0 yards, 0:14.**
- JAX – Leonard Fournette 75-yard run (Jason Myers kick), 14:35. Tied 7–7. **Drive: 1 play, 75 yards, 0:11.**
- LAR – Greg Zuerlein 56-yard field goal, 8:54. Rams 10–7. **Drive: 4 plays, 8 yards, 1:29.**
- JAX – Chris Ivory 22-yard pass from Blake Bortles (Jason Myers kick), 6:51. Jaguars 14–10. **Drive: 4 plays, 75 yards, 2:03.**
- LAR – Gerald Everett 4-yard pass from Jared Goff (Greg Zuerlein kick), 0:22. Rams 17–14. **Drive: 7 plays, 66 yards, 3:16.**

**Second quarter**

- LAR – Malcolm Brown 8-yard return of blocked punt (Greg Zuerlein kick), 2:25. Rams 24–14.

**Third quarter**

- JAX – Jason Myers 41-yard field goal, 5:16. Rams 24–17. **Drive: 9 plays, 29 yards, 5:00.**

**Fourth quarter**

- LAR – Greg Zuerlein 29-yard field goal, 2:32. Rams 27–17. **Drive: 12 plays, 57 yards, 5:08.**

**Top passers**

- LAR – Jared Goff – 11/21, 124 yards, 1 TD
- JAX – Blake Bortles – 23/35, 241 yards, 1 TD, 1 INT

**Top rushers**

- LAR – Todd Gurley – 23 rushes, 116 yards
- JAX – Leonard Fournette – 21 rushes, 130 yards, 1 TD

**Top receivers**

- LAR – Robert Woods – 5 receptions, 70 yards
- JAX – Chris Ivory – 9 receptions, 74 yards, 1 TD

**Top tacklers**

- LAR – Mark Barron – 8 tackles, 2 assists, 1 sack
- JAX – Telvin Smith – 8 tackles, 1 sack

The Rams got off to a fast start in Jacksonville as return man Pharoh Cooper took back the opening kickoff 103 yards for a touchdown, which earned him NFC Special Teams Player of the Week honors. The teams traded scores four times in the first quarter, with Greg Zuerlein converting a 56-yard field goal and Gerald Everett scoring on a 4-yard shovel pass from Jared Goff. In the second quarter, Cory Littleton blocked a punt by which Malcolm Brown picked up at the 8-yard-line for a touchdown. Zuerlein added a second field goal in the fourth quarter for the final margin. Nickell Robey-Coleman had an interception, and the Rams defense totaled five sacks of Jaguars quarterback Blake Bortles. Los Angeles, which had worn their blue-and-yellow throwback uniforms at home vs. Seattle the previous week, petitioned the NFL to allow them to wear the throwbacks on the road in Jacksonville, but their request was denied. With the host Jaguars wearing white, the Rams wore their Millennium Blue jerseys for the final time in franchise history, this time with white pants.

==== Week 7: vs. Arizona Cardinals ====
NFL International Series

Week Seven: Arizona Cardinals at Los Angeles Rams – Game summary

Quarter	1	2	3	4	Total
Cardinals	0	0	0	0	**0**
**Rams**	3	20	3	7	**33**

at Twickenham Stadium, London, England

- Date: October 22
- Game time: 10:00 am. PDT/6:00 p.m. BST
- Game weather: 54 °F (12 °C), Rain
- Game attendance: 73,736
- Referee: Brad Allen
- TV announcers (Fox): Sam Rosen, Ronde Barber and Kristina Pink
- Recap, Gamebook

Game information

**First quarter**

- LAR – Greg Zuerlein 23-yard field goal, 4:14. Rams 3–0. **Drive: 14 plays, 73 yards, 5:50.**

**Second quarter**

- LAR – Greg Zuerlein 33-yard field goal, 11:13. Rams 6–0. **Drive: 8 plays, 51 yards, 3:38.**
- LAR – Todd Gurley 18-yard run (Greg Zuerlein kick), 5:25. Rams 13–0. **Drive: 1 plays, 18 yards, 0:10.**
- LAR – Jared Goff 9-yard run (Greg Zuerlein kick), 0:41. Rams 20–0. **Drive: 8 plays, 88 yards, 1:23.**
- LAR – Greg Zuerlein 53-yard field goal, 0:00. Rams 23–0. **Drive: 4 plays, 17 yards, 0:33.**

**Third quarter**

- LAR – Greg Zuerlein 34-yard field goal, 10:53. Rams 26–0. **Drive: 10 plays, 63 yards, 4:07.**

**Fourth quarter**

- LAR – Cooper Kupp 18-yard pass from Jared Goff (Greg Zuerlein kick), 3:46. Rams 33–0. **Drive: 16 plays, 80 yards, 10:19.**

**Top passers**

- ARI – Carson Palmer – 10/18, 122 yards, INT
- LAR – Jared Goff – 22/37, 235 yards, TD, INT

**Top rushers**

- ARI – Adrian Peterson – 11 carries, 21 yards
- LAR – Todd Gurley – 22 carries, 106 yards, TD

**Top receivers**

- ARI – Larry Fitzgerald – 3 receptions, 29 yards
- LAR – Robert Woods – 5 receptions, 59 yards

**Top tacklers**

- ARI –
- LAR –

The Rams turned in a dominant performance over the NFC West rival Cardinals at London's Twickenham Stadium for their first-ever regular season victory outside the United States. Jared Goff threw for 235 yards and had a touchdown pass to Cooper Kupp (four receptions, 51 yards), with one interception. Goff also scored on a 9-yard run as the Rams built a 23–0 halftime lead. Todd Gurley had his fourth 100-yard rushing game of the season with 22 carries for 106 yards and a touchdown, plus four receptions for 48 yards. The Rams defense shut down Cardinals running back Adrian Peterson (12 carries, 21 yards) for the game and allowed only 196 total yards to Arizona. Cardinals quarterback Carson Palmer was hit hard by Rams linebacker Alec Ogletree as he threw late in the second quarter and the pass was picked off by Lamarcus Joyner to set up a Todd Gurley touchdown run. Palmer suffered a broken left arm on the play and was knocked out for the year (Palmer retired following the season). Mark Barron added another interception off Drew Stanton to set up the third of Greg Zuerlein's four field goals on the day. It was the Rams' first shutout victory since 2014, and their first-ever win in the NFL International Series. It was also one of two NFL London Games of the 2017 season to end in a shutout, the other being the New Orleans Saints' 20–0 victory over the Miami Dolphins in Wembley Stadium in Week 4.

==== Week 9: at New York Giants ====
Week Nine: Los Angeles Rams at New York Giants – Game summary

Quarter	1	2	3	4	Total
**Rams**	7	20	21	3	**51**
Giants	7	3	0	7	**17**

at MetLife Stadium, East Rutherford, New Jersey

- Date: November 5
- Game time: 10:00 am. PST/1:00 pm. EST
- Game weather: 56 °F (13 °C), cloudy with rain
- Game attendance: 76,877
- Referee: Ed Hochuli
- TV announcers (Fox): Kenny Albert, Ronde Barber and Kristina Pink
- Recap, Gamebook

Game information

**First quarter**

- LAR – Tyler Higbee 8-yard pass from Jared Goff (Greg Zuerlein kick), 11:03. Rams 7–0. **Drive: 4 plays, 52 yards, 1:50.**
- NYG – Tavarres King 5-yard pass from Eli Manning (Aldrick Rosas kick), 3:22. Tied 7–7. **Drive: 14 plays, 67 yards, 7:39.**

**Second quarter**

- LAR – Greg Zuerlein 27-yard field goal, 14:55. Rams 10–7. **Drive: 9 plays, 66 yards, 3:24.**
- LAR – Robert Woods 52-yard pass from Jared Goff (Greg Zuerlein kick), 9:39. Rams 17–7. **Drive: 6 plays, 50 yards, 3:35.**
- LAR – Sammy Watkins 67-yard pass from Jared Goff (Greg Zuerlein kick), 7:28. Rams 24–7. **Drive: 2 plays, 71 yards, 0:35.**
- NYG – Aldrick Rosas 50-yard field goal, 4:06. Rams 24–10. **Drive: 8 plays, 44 yards, 3:17.**
- LAR – Greg Zuerlein 46-yard field goal, 1:18. Rams 27–10. **Drive: 4 plays, 2 yards, 1:21.**

**Third quarter**

- LAR – Todd Gurley 1-yard run (Greg Zuerlein kick), 11:42. Rams 34–10. **Drive: 7 plays, 75 yards, 3:26.**
- LAR – Robert Woods 4-yard pass from Jared Goff (Greg Zuerlein kick), 6:34. Rams 41–10. **Drive: 4 plays, 45 yards, 1:30.**
- LAR – Todd Gurley 4-yard run (Greg Zuerlein kick), 3:34. Rams 48–10. **Drive: 3 plays, 18 yards, 1:26.**

**Fourth quarter**

- NYG – Evan Engram 10-yard pass from Eli Manning (Aldrick Rosas kick), 9:40. Rams 48–17. **Drive: 6 plays, 72 yards, 3:00.**
- LAR – Greg Zuerlein 47-yard field goal, 3:03. Rams 51–17. **Drive: 10 plays, 46 yards, 6:40.**

**Top passers**

- LAR – Jared Goff – 14/22, 311 yards, 4 TD
- NYG – Eli Manning – 20/36, 220 yards, 2 TD, INT

**Top rushers**

- LAR – Todd Gurley – 16 rushes, 59 yards, 2 TD
- NYG – Orleans Darkwa – 16 rushes, 71 yards

**Top receivers**

- LAR – Robert Woods – 4 receptions, 70 yards, 2 TD
- NYG – Evan Engram – 4 receptions, 70 yards, TD

**Top tacklers**

- LAR – Mark Barron – 7 tackles, 1 assist
- NYG – Landon Collins - 5 tackles, 2 assists

Returning to action after their bye week, the Rams put on a dominating performance against the host Giants, who suffered their worst loss since 1964. Jared Goff was named NFC Offensive Player of the Week after throwing for 311 yards and four touchdowns, two to Robert Woods and one each to Tyler Higbee and Sammy Watkins. Todd Gurley scored a pair of rushing touchdowns and added a 44-yard catch-and-run that set up another. The Rams defense forced three turnovers, including fumble recoveries by defensive tackle Aaron Donald and linebacker Connor Barwin and an interception by Trumaine Johnson, all of which led to Rams scores. Their special teams also contributed to the win, with three field goals by Greg Zuerlein and a blocked punt by Cory Littleton also setting up a touchdown by the offense.

==== Week 10: vs. Houston Texans ====
Week Ten: Houston Texans at Los Angeles Rams – Game summary

Quarter	1	2	3	4	Total
Texans	0	7	0	0	**7**
**Rams**	3	6	21	3	**33**

at Los Angeles Memorial Coliseum, Los Angeles, California

- Date: November 12
- Game time: 1:05 pm. PST
- Game weather: 68 °F (20 °C), cloudy
- Game attendance: 60,032
- Referee: Pete Morelli
- TV announcers (CBS): Ian Eagle, Dan Fouts and Evan Washburn
- Recap, Gamebook

Game information

**First quarter**

- LAR – Greg Zuerlein 27-yard field goal, 11:14. Rams 3–0. **Drive: 4 plays, 3 yards, 1:22.**

**Second quarter**

- LAR – Greg Zuerlein 33-yard field goal, 10:22. Rams 6–0. **Drive: 6 plays, 62 yards, 3:04.**
- HOU – Bruce Ellington 26-yard pass from Tom Savage (Kaʻimi Fairbairn kick), 6:31. Texans 7–6. **Drive: 8 plays, 75 yards, 3:46.**
- LAR – Greg Zuerlein 50-yard field goal, 0:23. Rams 9–7. **Drive: 10 plays, 43 yards, 1:21.**

**Third quarter**

- LAR – Robert Woods 94-yard pass from Jared Goff (Greg Zuerlein kick), 9:23. Rams 16–7. **Drive: 2 plays, 96 yards, 0:33.**
- LAR – Sammy Watkins 17-yard pass from Jared Goff (Greg Zuerlein kick), 1:33. Rams 23–7. **Drive: 3 plays, 36 yards, 1:18.**
- LAR – Robert Woods 12-yard pass from Jared Goff (Greg Zuerlein kick), 1:14. Rams 30–7. **Drive: 1 play, 12 yards, 0:10.**

**Fourth quarter**

- LAR – Greg Zuerlein 33-yard field goal, 7:38. Rams 33–7. **Drive: 9 plays, 74 yards, 6:21.**

**Top passers**

- HOU – Tom Savage – 18/36, 221 yards, TD, 2 INT
- LAR – Jared Goff – 25/37, 355 yards, 3 TD

**Top rushers**

- HOU – Lamar Miller – 11 carries, 60 yards
- LAR – Todd Gurley – 11 carries, 68 yards

**Top receivers**

- HOU – DeAndre Hopkins – 7 receptions, 111 yards
- LAR – Robert Woods – 8 receptions, 171 yards, 2 TD

Taking a 9–7 lead on three field goals by Greg Zuerlein during a quiet first half, the Rams exploded for three touchdowns during the third quarter of the Texans' first-ever visit to Los Angeles. Jared Goff passed for a career-high 355 yards and three touchdowns. Two went to Robert Woods, one of which went for 94 yards (the third-longest touchdown pass in Rams history), with the other going to Sammy Watkins. Meanwhile, the Rams defense forced four Texans turnovers, two of which were strip sack recoveries from Connor Barwin and rookie linebacker Samson Ebukam while the other two were interceptions by linebacker Mark Barron and strong safety Blake Countess. Zuerlein closed out the Rams' fourth-straight win with his fourth field goal. The 7–2 start was the best for the Rams since 2001. They now have at least one home victory against all 31 other franchises.

==== Week 11: at Minnesota Vikings ====
Week Eleven: Los Angeles Rams at Minnesota Vikings – Game summary

Quarter	1	2	3	4	Total
Rams	7	0	0	0	**7**
**Vikings**	0	7	0	17	**24**

at U.S. Bank Stadium, Minneapolis, Minnesota

- Date: November 19
- Game time: 10:00 am. PST/12:00 pm. CST
- Game weather: Played indoor (dome stadium)
- Game attendance: 66,809
- Referee: Walt Anderson
- TV announcers (Fox): Kevin Burkhardt, Charles Davis, Greg Olsen and Pam Oliver
- Recap, Gamebook

Game information

First quarter

- LAR – Todd Gurley 6-yard run (Greg Zuerlein kick), 10:42. Rams 7–0. **Drive: 9 plays, 75 yards, 4:18.**

Second quarter

- MIN – Latavius Murray 8-yard run (Kai Forbath kick), 13:31. Tied 7–7. **Drive: 7 plays, 30 yards, 3:09.**

Third quarter

- No scoring plays.

Fourth quarter

- MIN – Latavius Murray 2-yard run (Kai Forbath kick), 14:15. Vikings 14–7. **Drive: 11 plays, 71 yards, 6:01.**
- MIN – Adam Thielen 65-yard pass from Case Keenum (Kai Forbath kick), 10:14. Vikings 21–7. **Drive: 5 plays, 93 yards, 2:23.**
- MIN – Kai Forbath 39-yard field goal, 2:23. Vikings 24–7. **Drive: 12 plays, 64 yards, 5:55.**

Top passers

- LAR – Jared Goff – 23/37, 225 yards
- MIN – Case Keenum – 27/38, 280 yards, TD

Top rushers

- LAR – Todd Gurley – 15 rushes, 37 yards, TD
- MIN – Latavius Murray – 15 rushes, 95 yards, 2 TD

Top receivers

- LAR – Robert Woods – 8 receptions, 81 yards
- MIN – Adam Thielen – 6 receptions, 123 yards, TD

The Rams took the opening kickoff and drove 75 yards in nine plays, capping the drive with a 6-yard touchdown run by Todd Gurley. After the Vikings tied the game in the second quarter on a Latavius Murray touchdown run, Los Angeles came close to regaining the lead when Jared Goff connected with Cooper Kupp near the goal line. But Vikings safety Anthony Harris stripped the ball from Kupp and recovered it, and the Rams never threatened to score again. Vikings quarterback Case Keenum bedeviled his former Ram teammates, passing for 280 yards and a touchdown as Minnesota scored 17 unanswered points in the fourth quarter. Alec Ogletree had 12 tackles in what would be the only loss on the road for the Rams during the regular season.

==== Week 12: vs. New Orleans Saints ====
Week Twelve: New Orleans Saints at Los Angeles Rams – Game summary

Quarter	1	2	3	4	Total
Saints	7	3	0	10	**20**
**Rams**	10	7	3	6	**26**

at Los Angeles Memorial Coliseum, Los Angeles, California

- Date: November 26
- Game time: 1:25 pm. PST
- Game weather: 72 °F (22 °C), sunny, foggy
- Game attendance: 62,006
- Referee: John Parry
- TV announcers (CBS): Jim Nantz, Tony Romo and Tracy Wolfson
- Recap, Gamebook

Game information

**First quarter**

- LAR – Sammy Watkins 5-yard pass from Jared Goff (Greg Zuerlein kick), 10:53. Rams 7–0. **Drive: 7 plays, 59 yards, 4:07.**
- LAR – Greg Zuerlein 50-yard field goal, 3:02. Rams 10–0. **Drive: 11 plays, 51 yards, 5:28.**
- NO – Alvin Kamara 74-yard run (Wil Lutz kick), 2:14. Rams 10–7. **Drive: 2 plays, 75 yards, 0:48.**

**Second quarter**

- LAR – Josh Reynolds 7-yard pass from Jared Goff (Greg Zuerlein kick), 4:22. Rams 17–7. **Drive: 8 plays, 86 yards, 4:18.**
- NO – Wil Lutz 50-yard field goal, 0:58. Rams 17–10. **Drive: 8 plays, 44 yards, 3:24.**

**Third quarter**

- LAR – Greg Zuerlein 46-yard field goal, 3:37. Rams 20–10. **Drive: 7 plays, 59 yards, 3:13.**

**Fourth quarter**

- LAR – Greg Zuerlein 49-yard field goal, 14:11. Rams 23–10. **Drive: 6 plays, 50 yards, 3:20.**
- NO – Wil Lutz 21-yard field goal, 10:05. Rams 23–13. **Drive: 10 plays, 72 yards, 4:06.**
- LAR – Greg Zuerlein 26-yard field goal, 2:27. Rams 26–13. **Drive: 13 plays, 67 yards, 5:28.**
- NO – Alvin Kamara 15-yard pass from Drew Brees (Wil Lutz kick), 1:45. Rams 26–20. **Drive: 6 plays, 75 yards, 0:42.**

**Top passers**

- NO – Drew Brees – 22/32, 246 yards, TD
- LAR – Jared Goff – 28/43, 354 yards, 2 TD, INT

**Top rushers**

- NO – Alvin Kamara – 5 carries, 87 yards, TD
- LAR – Todd Gurley – 17 carries, 74 yards

**Top receivers**

- NO – Ted Ginn Jr. – 7 receptions, 71 yards
- LAR – Cooper Kupp – 8 receptions, 116 yards

**Top tacklers**

- NO –
- LAR –

Jared Goff passed for 354 yards and touchdowns to wide receivers Sammy Watkins and rookie Josh Reynolds as the Rams grabbed an early lead and kept it throughout in holding off the eventual NFC South Division champions. Cooper Kupp had a season-high eight receptions for 116 yards, and Greg Zuerlein added four field goals. On defense, both Aaron Donald and defensive end Robert Quinn had five tackles and a sack for the game. With the win over the New Orleans Saints, the Rams improved to 8–3, their first non-losing season since 2006.

==== Week 13: at Arizona Cardinals ====
Week Thirteen: Los Angeles Rams at Arizona Cardinals – Game summary

Quarter	1	2	3	4	Total
**Rams**	16	3	7	6	**32**
Cardinals	0	13	0	3	**16**

at University of Phoenix Stadium, Glendale, Arizona

- Date: December 3
- Game time: 1:25 pm. PST/2:25 p.m. MST
- Game weather: Played indoor (retractable roof closed)
- Game attendance: 63,986
- Referee: Ronald Torbert
- TV announcers (Fox): Chris Myers, Daryl Johnston and Laura Okmin
- Recap, Gamebook

Game information

**First quarter**

- LAR – Greg Zuerlein 56-yard field goal, 11:41. Rams 3–0. **Drive: 6 plays, 31 yards, 3:19.**
- LAR – Gerald Everett 1-yard pass from Jared Goff (kick failed), 7:51. Rams 9–0. **Drive: 7 plays, 23 yards, 3:30.**
- LAR – Alec Ogletree 41-yard interception return (Greg Zuerlein kick), 2:45. Rams 16–0.

**Second quarter**

- ARI – Elijhaa Penny 1-yard run (Phil Dawson kick), 7:38. Rams 16–7. **Drive: 9 plays, 67 yards, 6:07.**
- ARI – Larry Fitzgerald 15-yard pass from Blaine Gabbert (kick blocked), 3:25. Rams 16–13. **Drive: 6 plays, 70 yards, 2:28.**
- LAR – Greg Zuerlein 20-yard field goal, 0:00. Rams 19–13. **Drive: 9 plays, 78 yards, 3:25.**

**Third quarter**

- LAR – Sammy Watkins 11-yard pass from Jared Goff (Greg Zuerlein kick), 5:07. Rams 26–13. **Drive: 6 plays, 30 yards, 3:00.**

**Fourth quarter**

- ARI – Phil Dawson 54-yard field goal, 14:55. Rams 26–16. **Drive: 10 plays, 46 yards, 5:12.**
- LAR – Greg Zuerlein 24-yard field goal, 6:18. Rams 29–16. **Drive: 8 plays, 52 yards, 4:34.**
- LAR – Greg Zuerlein 41-yard field goal, 1:55. Rams 32–16. **Drive: 7 plays, 31 yards, 2:34.**

**Top passers**

- LAR – Jared Goff – 21/31, 220 yards, 2 TD, INT
- ARI – Blaine Gabbert – 18/32, 221 yards, TD, 2 INT

**Top rushers**

- LAR – Todd Gurley – 19 carries, 74 yards
- ARI – Kerwynn Williams – 16 carries, 97 yards

**Top receivers**

- LAR – Todd Gurley – 6 receptions, 84 yards
- ARI – Larry Fitzgerald – 10 receptions, 98 yards, 1 TD

**Top tacklers**

- LAR –
- ARI –

The Rams jumped out to a 16-0 first quarter lead and never looked back against the host Cardinals. Tight end Gerald Everett and wide receiver Sammy Watkins both scored on touchdown passes from Jared Goff, and kicker Greg Zuerlein converted four field goals. The defense combined for a season-high seven sacks of Cardinals quarterback Blaine Gabbert, with Aaron Donald, Robert Quinn and Ethan Westbrooks totaling two sacks each. Cornerback Trumaine Johnson had a team-high seven tackles and Alec Ogletree picked off a Gabbert pass and returned it 41 yards for a touchdown. With the win over Arizona, the Rams improved to 9-3 and achieved their first winning season since 2003.

==== Week 14: vs. Philadelphia Eagles ====
Week Fourteen: Philadelphia Eagles at Los Angeles Rams – Game summary

Quarter	1	2	3	4	Total
**Eagles**	14	10	7	12	**43**
Rams	7	7	14	7	**35**

at Los Angeles Memorial Coliseum, Los Angeles, California

- Date: December 10
- Game time: 1:25 pm. PST
- Game weather: 83 °F (28 °C), cloudy
- Game attendance: 67,752
- Referee: Craig Wrolstad
- TV announcers (Fox): Joe Buck, Troy Aikman and Erin Andrews
- Recap, Gamebook

Game information

**First quarter**

- LAR – Todd Gurley 2-yard rush (Greg Zuerlein kick), 13:00. Rams 7–0. **Drive: 3 plays, 37 yards, 0:56.**
- PHI – Brent Celek 5-yard pass from Carson Wentz (Jake Elliott kick), 8:44. Tie 7–7. **Drive: 8 plays, 66 yards, 4:16.**
- PHI – Trey Burton 20-yard pass from Carson Wentz (Jake Elliott kick), 2:54. Eagles 14–7. **Drive: 7 plays, 52 yards, 3:43.**

**Second quarter**

- PHI – Trey Burton 11-yard pass from Carson Wentz (Jake Elliott kick), 11:10. Eagles 21–7. **Drive: 11 plays, 80 yards, 4:32.**
- LAR – Cooper Kupp 6-yard pass from Jared Goff (Greg Zuerlein kick), 9:24. Eagles 21–14. **Drive: 6 plays, 70 yards, 1:46.**
- PHI – Jake Elliott 22-yard field goal, 0:09. Eagles 24–14. **Drive: 10 plays, 80 yards, 1:40.**

**Third quarter**

- LAR – Sammy Watkins 1-yard pass from Jared Goff (Greg Zuerlein kick), 11:41. Eagles 24–21. **Drive: 6 plays, 71 yards, 3:19.**
- LAR – Blake Countess 16-yard blocked punt return (Greg Zuerlein kick), 10:07. Rams 28–24. **Drive: 0 plays, 16 yards, 0:00.**
- PHI – Alshon Jeffery 2-yard pass from Carson Wentz (Jake Elliott kick), 2:20. Eagles 31–28. **Drive: 15 plays, 77 yards, 7:47.**

**Fourth quarter**

- LAR – Todd Gurley 1-yard rush (Greg Zuerlein kick), 13:58. Rams 35–31. **Drive: 7 plays, 70 yards, 3:22.**
- PHI – Jake Elliott 41-yard field goal, 9:54. Rams 35–34. **Drive: 10 plays, 47 yards, 4:04.**
- PHI – Jake Elliott 33-yard field goal, 3:45. Eagles 37–35. **Drive: 7 plays, 5 yards, 4:28.**
- PHI – Brandon Graham 16-yard fumble return (rush failed), 0:00. Eagles 43–35. **Drive: 0 plays, 16 yards, 0:00.**

**Top passers**

- PHI – Carson Wentz: 23/41, 291 yards, 4 TD, INT
- LAR – Jared Goff: 16/26, 199 yards, 2 TD

**Top rushers**

- PHI – Jay Ajayi: 15 rushes, 78 yards
- LAR – Todd Gurley: 13 rushes, 96 yards, 2 TD

**Top receivers**

- PHI – Torrey Smith: 6 receptions, 100 yards
- LAR – Cooper Kupp: 5 receptions, 118 yards, TD

**Top tacklers**

- PHI – Nigel Bradham, Ronald Darby: 6 tackles
- LAR – John Johnson: 7 tackles, 4 assists

The showdown between two of the NFC's top teams did not disappoint, as the first two picks in the 2016 NFL draft faced off for the first time in a high-scoring game that featured four lead changes. Eagles quarterback Carson Wentz threw three touchdown passes in the second quarter as Philadelphia came back to stake out a 24–14 halftime lead. The Rams rallied in the third period as Jared Goff found Sammy Watkins for his second touchdown pass of the game and Blake Countess recovered a blocked punt for a score that put the Rams on top 28–24. Wentz drove the Eagles to the goal line and suffered what would be a season-ending torn ACL injury, but Wentz did not leave the field before throwing his fourth TD pass of the game to Alshon Jeffery to give Philadelphia a 31–28 lead. Early in the fourth quarter, Todd Gurley (13 carries, 96 yards) scored his second touchdown of the game to give the Rams a 35–31 advantage. But former Rams QB Nick Foles stepped in for the injured Wentz and engineered two scoring drives that ended in field goals for the Eagles, who took a 37–35 lead. With just seven seconds remaining, the Rams' last-ditch play went disastrously, as Tavon Austin fumbled a lateral from Pharoh Cooper which Eagles defensive end Brandon Graham ran in for a touchdown as time expired. With the loss, the Rams fell to 9–4 while the Eagles clinched the NFC East for the first time since 2013.

==== Week 15: at Seattle Seahawks ====
Week Fifteen: Los Angeles Rams at Seattle Seahawks – Game summary

Quarter	1	2	3	4	Total
**Rams**	13	21	6	2	**42**
Seahawks	0	0	7	0	**7**

at CenturyLink Field, Seattle, Washington

- Date: December 17
- Game time: 1:05 pm. PST
- Game weather: 47 °F (8 °C), cloudy
- Game attendance: 69,077
- Referee: Ed Hochuli
- TV announcers (Fox): Kevin Burkhardt, Charles Davis and Pam Oliver
- Recap, Gamebook

Game information

**First quarter**

- LAR – Greg Zuerlein 36-yard field goal, 12:06. Rams 3–0. **Drive: 5 plays, 22 yards, 1:30.**
- LAR – Greg Zuerlein 31-yard field goal, 8:21. Rams 6–0. **Drive: 7 plays, 37 yards, 2:39.**
- LAR – Todd Gurley 1-yard run (Greg Zuerlein kick), 5:57. Rams 13–0. **Drive: 1 plays, 1 yards, 0:03.**

**Second quarter**

- LAR – Todd Gurley 1-yard run (Greg Zuerlein kick), 8:13. Rams 20–0. **Drive: 5 plays, 36 yards, 2:02.**
- LAR – Robert Woods 1-yard pass from Jared Goff (Greg Zuerlein kick), 3:26. Rams 27–0. **Drive: 7 plays, 39 yards, 4:01.**
- LAR – Todd Gurley 57-yard run (Greg Zuerlein kick), 0:28. Rams 34–0. **Drive: 3 plays, 47 yards, 0:51.**

**Third quarter**

- LAR – Todd Gurley 14-yard pass from Jared Goff (kick failed), 7:04. Rams 40–0. **Drive: 7 plays, 46 yards, 3:52.**
- SEA – Luke Wilson 26-yard pass from Russell Wilson (Blair Walsh kick), 1:23. Rams 40–7. **Drive: 7 plays, 77 yards, 1:48.**

**Fourth quarter**

- LAR – Penalty on Russell Wilson enfored in end zone for Safety, 10:14. Rams 42–7.

**Top passers**

- LAR – Jared Goff – 14/21, 120 yards, 2 TD, INT
- SEA – Russell Wilson – 14/30, 142 yards, TD

**Top rushers**

- LAR – Todd Gurley – 21 carries, 152 yards, 3 TD
- SEA – Russell Wilson – 5 carries, 39 yards

**Top receivers**

- LAR – Robert Woods – 6 receptions, 45 yards, TD
- SEA – J. D. McKissic – 3 receptions, 38 yards

**Top tacklers**

- LAR – Aaron Donald – 4 tackles, 1 assisted, 3 sacks
- SEA – Bradley McDougald – 7 tackles, 2 assisted

The Rams thoroughly dominated the Seahawks, rolling to a 40-point lead by the third quarter in their biggest-ever win in Seattle. Running back Todd Gurley ran 21 times for 152 yards and three touchdowns, while also catching three passes for 28 yards and another score and was named NFC Offensive Player of the Week. The Rams defense menaced Seahawks quarterback Russell Wilson all day long with seven sacks, three coming from Aaron Donald and two more credited to Robert Quinn. Kicker Greg Zuerlein kicked two field goals and four PATs to add to his league-leading total of 158 points, but aggravated a back injury so severely that he was placed on injured reserve soon after the game. The Rams improved to 10–4 as head coach Sean McVay became the youngest coach to win 10 regular season games since 1937.

==== Week 16: at Tennessee Titans ====
Week Sixteen: Los Angeles Rams at Tennessee Titans – Game summary

Quarter	1	2	3	4	Total
**Rams**	6	7	7	7	**27**
Titans	3	10	7	3	**23**

at Nissan Stadium, Nashville, Tennessee

- Date: December 24
- Game time: 10:00 am. PST/12:00 pm. CST
- Game weather: 39 °F (4 °C), cloudy, rain
- Game attendance: 60,097
- Referee: Walt Anderson
- TV announcers (Fox): Chris Myers, Daryl Johnston and Laura Okmin
- Recap, Gamebook

Game information

**First quarter**

- LAR – Todd Gurley 3-yard pass from Jared Goff (kick failed), 8:54. Rams 6–0. **Drive: 4 plays, 53 yards, 2:07.**
- TEN – Ryan Succop 25-yard field goal, 1:13. Rams 6–3. **Drive: 14 plays, 62 yards, 7:41.**

**Second quarter**

- TEN – Wesley Woodyard 4-yard fumble return (Ryan Succop kick), 5:20. Titans 10–6.
- LAR – Todd Gurley 80-yard pass from Jared Goff (Sam Ficken kick), 4:24. Rams 13–10. **Drive: 2 plays, 79 yards, 0:56.**
- TEN – Ryan Succop 37-yard field goal, 0:19. Tied 13–13. **Drive: 11 plays, 56 yards, 4:05.**

**Third quarter**

- LAR – Sammy Watkins 3-yard pass from Jared Goff (Sam Ficken kick), 6:40. Rams 20–13. **Drive: 7 plays, 65 yards, 2:57.**
- TEN – DeMarco Murray 6-yard run (Ryan Succop kick), 4:23. Tied 20–20. **Drive: 5 plays, 44 yards, 2:17.**

**Fourth quarter**

- TEN – Ryan Succop 27-yard field goal, 14:46. Titans 23–20. **Drive: 9 plays, 64 yards, 3:40.**
- LAR – Cooper Kupp 14-yard pass from Jared Goff (Sam Ficken kick), 11:51. Rams 27–23. **Drive: 6 plays, 68 yards, 2:55.**

**Top passers**

- LAR – Jared Goff – 22/38, 301 yards, 4 TD
- TEN – Marcus Mariota – 22/39, 275 yards, INT

**Top rushers**

- LAR – Todd Gurley – 22 carries, 118 yards
- TEN – DeMarco Murray – 15 carries, 48 yards, TD

**Top receivers**

- LAR – Todd Gurley – 10 receptions, 158 yards, 2 TD
- TEN – Corey Davis – 6 receptions, 91 yards

**Top tacklers**

- LAR – Aaron Donald
- TEN –

In this Super Bowl XXXIV rematch, the Rams clinched their first NFC Western Division title since 2003 in a wild shootout with the Titans in Nashville. Running back Todd Gurley repeated as NFC Offensive Player of the Week after finishing with 22 carries for 118 yards and 10 catches for 158 yards and 2 TDs, including an 80-yard catch-and-run in the second quarter. Trailing by three in the fourth quarter, Jared Goff engineered the first comeback win of his professional career, completing 22 of 38 passes for 301 yards and four touchdowns, the last going to Cooper Kupp on a 14-yard scoring strike with 11:51 remaining. The Rams defense held the Titans scoreless on their final three drives to seal the victory. The victory also guaranteed the Rams their first playoff berth since 2004.

==== Week 17: vs. San Francisco 49ers ====
Week Seventeen: San Francisco 49ers at Los Angeles Rams – Game summary

Quarter	1	2	3	4	Total
**49ers**	10	10	7	7	**34**
Rams	3	3	0	7	**13**

at Los Angeles Memorial Coliseum, Los Angeles, California

- Date: December 31
- Game time: 1:25 pm. PST
- Game weather: 67 °F (19 °C), sunny
- Game attendance: 66,125
- Referee: Terry McAulay
- TV announcers (Fox): Joe Davis, Brady Quinn and Jenny Taft
- Recap, Gamebook

Game information

**First quarter**

- SF – Robbie Gould 33-yard field goal, 12:08. 49ers 3–0. **Drive: 8 plays, 60 yards, 2:52.**
- SF – Marquise Goodwin 8-yard pass from Jimmy Garoppolo (Robbie Gould kick), 5:14. 49ers 10–0. **Drive: 8 plays, 82 yards, 4:27.**
- LAR – Sam Ficken 23-yard field goal, 1:11. 49ers 10–3. **Drive: 6 plays, 17 yards, 2:13.**

**Second quarter**

- SF – Robbie Gould 48-yard field goal, 5:00. 49ers 13–3. **Drive: 11 plays, 67 yards, 4:52.**
- SF – Carlos Hyde 8-yard run (Robbie Gould kick), 1:13. 49ers 20–3. **Drive: 3 plays, 57 yards, 1:00.**
- LAR – Sam Ficken 21-yard field goal, 0:00. 49ers 20–6. **Drive: 2 plays, 50 yards, 0:09.**

**Third quarter**

- SF – Carlos Hyde 5-yard run (Robbie Gould kick), 6:12. 49ers 27–6. **Drive: 7 plays, 60 yards, 2:33.**

**Fourth quarter**

- SF – Aldrick Robinson 12-yard pass from Jimmy Garoppolo (Robbie Gould kick), 14:54. 49ers 34–6. **Drive: 7 plays, 53 yards, 3:39.**
- LAR – Lance Dunbar 8-yard run (Sam Ficken kick), 6:40. 49ers 34–13. **Drive: 15 plays, 72 yards, 8:14.**

**Top passers**

- SF – Jimmy Garoppolo – 20/33, 292 yards, 2 TD, 2 INT
- LAR – Sean Mannion – 20/34, 169 yards

**Top rushers**

- SF – Carlos Hyde – 15 carries, 88 yards, 2 TD
- LAR – Malcolm Brown – 14 carries, 54 yards

**Top receivers**

- SF – George Kittle – 4 receptions, 100 yards
- LAR – Malcolm Brown – 4 receptions, 7 yards

**Top tacklers**

- SF – Brock Coyle - 8
- LAR – Kevin Peterson - 8

With no chance to improve his team's standing, Rams head coach Sean McVay opted to rest most of his starting lineup for the season finale. The 49ers got their fifth straight win to close the season as Jimmy Garoppolo passed for 292 yards and two touchdowns while Carlos Hyde ran for two more scores for San Francisco. Rams replacement kicker Sam Ficken kicked a pair of field goals in the first half and backup running back Lance Dunbar scored on an 8-yard run in the fourth quarter. Sean Mannion made his first pro start for the Rams at quarterback, going 20-of-34 for 169 yards. On defense, cornerback Kevin Peterson led the Rams in tackles (eight), pass deflections (five), and interceptions (two) as the Rams finished with an 11–5 record. The Rams wore their classic blue-and-yellow throwback uniforms for the second time in the season.

=== Standings ===
==== Division ====
NFC West
	W	L	T	PCT	DIV	CONF	PF	PA	STK
^{(3)} Los Angeles Rams	11	5	0	.688	4–2	7–5	478	329	L1
Seattle Seahawks	9	7	0	.563	4–2	7–5	366	332	L1
Arizona Cardinals	8	8	0	.500	3–3	5–7	295	361	W2
San Francisco 49ers	6	10	0	.375	1–5	3–9	331	383	W5

==== Conference ====
NFC
#	Team	Division	W	L	T	PCT	DIV	CONF	SOS	SOV	STK
**Division leaders**
1 (Note: Philadelphia claimed the No. 1 seed over Minnesota based on winning percentage vs. common opponents. Philadelphia's cumulative record against Carolina, Chicago, the Los Angeles Rams and Washington was 5–0, compared to Minnesota's 4–1 cumulative record against the same four teams.)	Philadelphia Eagles	East	13	3	0	.813	5–1	10–2	.461	.433	L1
2	Minnesota Vikings	North	13	3	0	.813	5–1	10–2	.492	.447	W3
3 (Note: LA Rams claimed the No. 3 seed over New Orleans based on head-to-head victory.)	Los Angeles Rams	West	11	5	0	.688	4–2	7–5	.504	.460	L1
4 (Note: New Orleans clinched the NFC South division over Carolina based on head-to-head sweep.)	New Orleans Saints	South	11	5	0	.688	4–2	8–4	.535	.483	L1
**Wild Cards**
5	Carolina Panthers	South	11	5	0	.688	3–3	7–5	.539	.500	L1
6	Atlanta Falcons	South	10	6	0	.625	4–2	9–3	.543	.475	W1
**Did not qualify for the postseason**
7 (Note: Detroit finished ahead of Dallas and Seattle based on conference record, while Seattle finished ahead of Dallas based on head-to-head victory.)	Detroit Lions	North	9	7	0	.563	5–1	8–4	.496	.368	W1
8	Seattle Seahawks	West	9	7	0	.563	4–2	7–5	.492	.444	L1
9	Dallas Cowboys	East	9	7	0	.563	5–1	7–5	.496	.438	W1
10	Arizona Cardinals	West	8	8	0	.500	3–3	5–7	.488	.406	W2
11 (Note: Green Bay finished ahead of Washington based on record vs. common opponents. Green Bay's cumulative record against Dallas, Minnesota, New Orleans and Seattle was 2–3, compared to Washington's 1–4 cumulative record against the same four teams.)	Green Bay Packers	North	7	9	0	.438	2–4	5–7	.539	.357	L3
12	Washington Redskins	East	7	9	0	.438	1–5	5–7	.539	.429	L1
13	San Francisco 49ers	West	6	10	0	.375	1–5	3–9	.512	.438	W5
14 (Note: Tampa Bay finished ahead of Chicago based on head-to-head victory.)	Tampa Bay Buccaneers	South	5	11	0	.313	1–5	3–9	.555	.375	W1
15	Chicago Bears	North	5	11	0	.313	0–6	1–11	.559	.500	L1
16	New York Giants	East	3	13	0	.188	1–5	1–11	.531	.458	W1
**Tiebreakers** (Note: When breaking ties for three or more teams under the NFL's rules, they are first broken within divisions, then comparing only the highest-ranked remaining team from each division.)

== Postseason ==
Round	Date	Opponent (seed)	Result	Record	Venue	Recap
Wild Card	January 6, 2018	Atlanta Falcons (6)	L 13–26	0–1	Los Angeles Memorial Coliseum	Recap

=== NFC Wild Card Playoffs: vs. (6) Atlanta Falcons ===
NFC Wild Card Playoffs: (6) Atlanta Falcons at (3) Los Angeles Rams – Game summary

Quarter	1	2	3	4	Total
Falcons	6	7	6	7	26
Rams	0	10	0	3	13

at Los Angeles Memorial Coliseum, Los Angeles, California

- Date: January 6, 2018
- Game time: 5:15 p.m. PST
- Game weather: 62 °F (17 °C), cloudy
- Game attendance: 74,300
- Referee: Ed Hochuli
- TV announcers (NBC): Al Michaels, Cris Collinsworth and Michele Tafoya
- Recap, Gamebook

Game information

1st quarter

- ATL – Matt Bryant 29-yard field goal, 7:13. Falcons 3–0. Drive: 4 plays, 6 yards, 1:27.
- ATL – Matt Bryant 51-yard field goal, 1:23. Falcons 6–0. Drive: 9 plays, 57 yards, 4:12.

2nd quarter

- ATL – Devonta Freeman 3-yard run (Matt Bryant kick), 11:34. Falcons 13–0. Drive: 8 plays, 32 yards, 4:41.
- LAR – Cooper Kupp 14-yard pass from Jared Goff (Sam Ficken kick), 2:34. Falcons 13–7. Drive: 7 plays, 79 yards, 3:05.
- LAR – Sam Ficken 35-yard field goal, 0:03. Falcons 13–10. Drive: 6 plays, 67 yards, 1:12.

3rd quarter

- ATL – Matt Bryant 25-yard field goal, 6:45. Falcons 16–10. Drive: 16 plays, 76 yards, 8:15.
- ATL – Matt Bryant 54-yard field goal, 0:19. Falcons 19–10. Drive: 10 plays, 45 yards, 4:52.

4th quarter

- LAR – Sam Ficken 32-yard field goal, 10:49. Falcons 19–13. Drive: 9 plays, 67 yards, 4:30.
- ATL – Julio Jones 8-yard pass from Matt Ryan (Matt Bryant kick), 5:48. Falcons 26–13. Drive: 8 plays, 83 yards, 5:01.

Top passers

- ATL – Matt Ryan – 21/30, 218 yards, TD
- LAR – Jared Goff – 24/45, 259 yards, TD

Top rushers

- ATL – Devonta Freeman – 18 rushes, 66 yards, TD
- LAR – Todd Gurley – 14 rushes, 101 yards

Top receivers

- ATL – Julio Jones – 9 receptions, 94 yards, TD
- LAR – Robert Woods – 9 receptions, 142 yards

The Los Angeles Rams hosted their first playoff game in the Greater Los Angeles Area since 1985, as well as their first playoff game at the Los Angeles Memorial Coliseum since the 1978 NFC Championship Game. But the defending conference champion Falcons started off strong, capitalizing on two special teams miscues by the Rams to build a 13–0 lead on two Matt Bryant field goals and a 3-yard run by Devonta Freeman. Los Angeles rallied as Jared Goff connected with Cooper Kupp on a 14-yard touchdown pass and Sam Ficken hit a 35-yard field goal just before halftime. Todd Gurley was effective with 101 yards on just 14 carries, but the Falcons were able to control the clock, dominating time of possession 37:35 to 22:25. The teams traded field goals in the second half, but Atlanta pulled away late as quarterback Matt Ryan iced the game with an 8-yard touchdown pass to wide receiver Julio Jones for the final 26–13 margin. Rams wide receiver Robert Woods had nine receptions for 142 yards in the loss, the Rams franchise's first playoff appearance since 2004 where, coincidentally, their loss also came to the Falcons.

== Awards and honors ==
Recipient	Award(s)
Trumaine Johnson	Week 1: NFC Defensive Player of the Week
Todd Gurley	September: NFC Offensive Player of the Month; Week 4: NFC Offensive Player of the Week; Week 15: NFC Offensive Player of the Week; Week 15: FedEx Ground Player of the Week; Week 16: NFC Offensive Player of the Week; Week 16: FedEx Ground Player of the Week; December: NFC Offensive Player of the Month; FedEx Ground Player of the Year; AP NFL Offensive Player of the Year
Greg Zuerlein	Week 4: NFC Special Teams Player of the Week; October: NFC Special Teams Player of the Month; Week 10: NFC Special Teams Player of the Week; November: NFC Special Teams Player of the Month
Pharoh Cooper	Week 6: NFC Special Teams Player of the Week
Jared Goff	Week 9: NFC Offensive Player of the Week; Week 16: FedEx Air Player of the Week
Aaron Donald	AP NFL Defensive Player of the Year
Sean McVay	AP NFL Coach of the Year
