= Samson Ebukam =

Nigerian-American football player (born 1995)

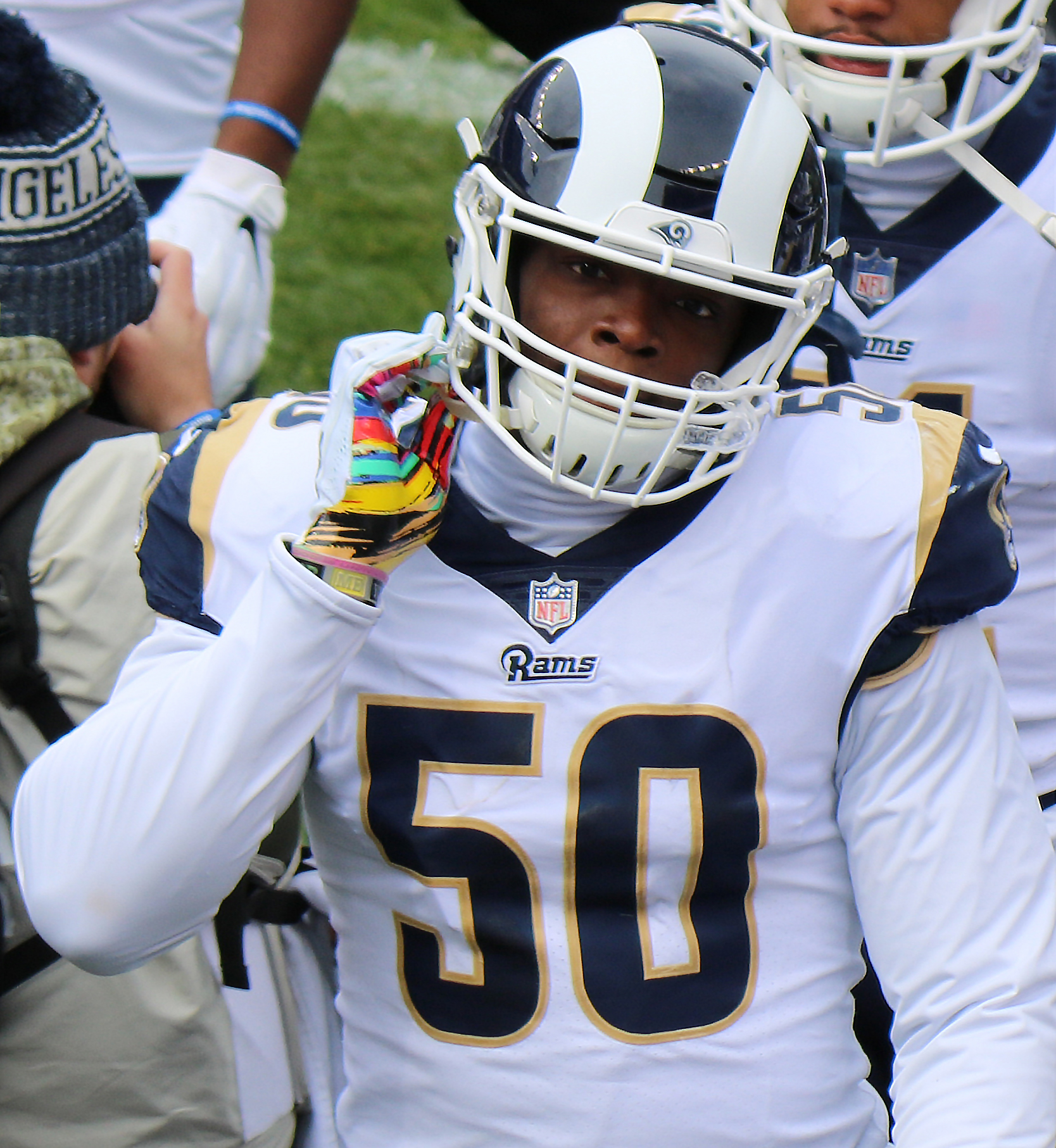
- Ebukam with the Los Angeles Rams in 2018

No. 52 – Atlanta Falcons
- Position: Defensive end
- Roster status: Injured reserve

Personal information
- Born: May 9, 1995 (age 31); Lagos, Nigeria
- Listed height: 6 ft 2 in (1.88 m)
- Listed weight: 245 lb (111 kg)

Career information
- High school: David Douglas (Portland, Oregon, U.S.)
- College: Eastern Washington (2013–2016)
- NFL draft: 2017: 4th round, 125th overall pick

Career history
- Los Angeles Rams (2017–2020); San Francisco 49ers (2021–2022); Indianapolis Colts (2023–2025); Atlanta Falcons (2026–present)

Awards and highlights
- FCS All-American (2016); First-team All-Big Sky (2016); 2× Second-team All-Big Sky (2014, 2015)

Career NFL statistics as of Week 5, 2026
- Total tackles: 320
- Sacks: 37.5
- Forced fumbles: 11
- Fumble recoveries: 6
- Pass deflections: 9
- Interceptions: 1
- Defensive touchdowns: 2
- Stats at Pro Football Reference

Nnamka Samson Ebukam (born May 9, 1995) is a Nigerian American professional football defensive end for the Atlanta Falcons of the National Football League (NFL). He played college football for the Eastern Washington Eagles and was selected by the Los Angeles Rams in the fourth round of the 2017 NFL draft.

== Early life ==
Ebukam was born in Onitsha, Nigeria, and moved to the United States at the age of nine. He attended and graduated from David Douglas High School in Portland, Oregon, in 2013. While there, he played high school football for the Scots. As a senior, Ebukam played at defensive end, tight end, and fullback, earning First Team All-Mount Hood Conference honors as a defensive end, and also earning honorable mention honors as a tight end.

== College career ==
Coming out of high school, Ebukam received only two Division I scholarship offers. He chose to attend Eastern Washington University over an offer from Portland State.

Ebukam played for Eastern Washington as a three-year starter. Over 38 career collegiate starts, Ebukam produced 188 tackles, 44 tackles for losses, and 24 sacks. As a senior, he tallied 15 tackles for losses and 9.5 sacks, plus three fumble recoveries, two forced fumbles, eight quarterback hits, and an interception.

== Professional career ==
=== Pre-draft ===
Ebukam was not selected to participate in the 2017 NFL Combine, but he did participate in the NFLPA Collegiate Bowl.

Pre-draft measurables
Height	Weight	Arm length	Hand span	Wingspan	40-yard dash	10-yard split	20-yard split	20-yard shuttle	Three-cone drill	Vertical jump	Broad jump	Bench press
6 ft 1 7/8 in (1.88 m)	240 lb (109 kg)	32 1/2 in (0.83 m)	9 5/8 in (0.24 m)	6 ft 6 3/4 in (2.00 m)	4.45 s	1.53 s	2.57 s	4.31 s	7.02 s	39 in (0.99 m)	10 ft 10 in (3.30 m)	24 reps
All values from 2017 EWU Pro Day

=== Los Angeles Rams ===
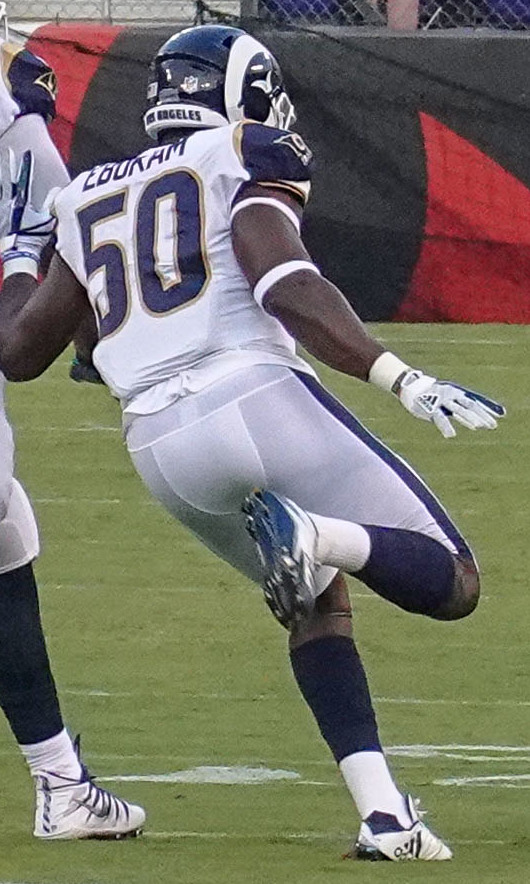
Ebukam in 2018

==== 2017 ====
The Los Angeles Rams selected Ebukam in the fourth round with the 125th overall pick of the 2017 NFL draft. The Rams traded their fourth-round (141st overall) and sixth-round (197th overall) picks in the 2017 NFL Draft to the New York Jets and received the fourth round pick (125th overall) used to draft Ebukam. Ebukam was the 17th linebacker drafted in 2017.

External videos
- Rams draft Samson Ebukam 125th overall
- Samson Ebukam NFL Draft Highlights

On June 20, 2017, the Rams signed Ebukam to a four-year, $3.01 million contract that includes a signing bonus of $613,082.

Throughout training camp, Ebukam competed to be a backup outside linebacker against Morgan Fox, Ejuan Price, Cory Littleton, and Carlos Thompson. Head coach Sean McVay named Ebukam a backup outside linebacker to start the regular season, behind Robert Quinn and Connor Barwin.

External videos
- Ebukam strip sacks Tom Savage

He made his professional regular season debut in the Rams' season-opener against the Indianapolis Colts and recorded three solo tackles in their 46–9 victory. On November 12, 2017, Ebukam recorded one solo tackle and forced the first fumble of his career during a sack in the Rams' 33–7 win against the Houston Texans. Ebukam made his first career sack on Texans' quarterback Tom Savage for a seven-yard loss and forced a fumble that was recovered by teammate Tyrunn Walker in the third quarter. On December 3, 2017, Ebukam earned his first career start and collected a season-high five solo tackles in a 32–16 win at the Arizona Cardinals in Week 13. He finished his rookie season in 2017 with 31 combined tackles (26 solo), two sacks, and a forced fumble in 16 games and two starts.

The Los Angeles Rams finished the 2017 season first in the NFC West with an 11–5 record and earned a playoff berth. On January 6, 2018, Ebukam appeared in his first career playoff game and made one tackle during the Rams' 26–13 loss against the Atlanta Falcons in the Wild Card Round.

==== 2018 ====
Ebukam entered training camp slated as a starting outside linebacker. Head coach Sean McVay named Ebukam and Matt Longacre the starting outside linebackers to begin the regular season, alongside inside linebackers Mark Barron and Cory Littleton. In Week 11 on Monday Night Football, Ebukam scored two defensive touchdowns off turnovers (one fumble, one interception) and forced another interception in a 54–51 win over the Kansas City Chiefs, earning him NFC Defensive Player of the Week honors. Ebukam finished the season with 40 tackles, one interception, and three forced fumbles. In the Divisional Round against the Dallas Cowboys, he recorded two tackles in a 30–22 win. In the NFC Championship Game against the New Orleans Saints, he recorded three tackles and a forced fumble in a tough 26–23 overtime victory. The Rams made it to Super Bowl LIII where they played the New England Patriots, but lost 3–13. Ebukam recorded four tackles in the Super Bowl.

==== 2019 ====
In 2019, Ebukam played in 16 games, with five starts. He recorded 48 tackles, four and a half sacks, one forced fumble, two fumble recoveries, and 4 passes defensed.

==== 2020 ====
In 2020, Ebukam played in 16 games, starting 14. He tallied 31 tackles, four and a half sacks, one forced fumble, and one pass defensed. Two of those sacks came in the second half of a Week 17 game against the Arizona Cardinals which was critical for both teams, as the winner would clinch a playoff spot. Ebukam's first sack came late in the third quarter and resulted in a loss of one yard. His second sack occurred with just under ten minutes left in the fourth quarter on a second and goal play when he tackled quarterback Kyler Murray eight yards behind the line of scrimmage, helping to force an Arizona field goal attempt. The kick was blocked, keeping the score at 18–7 Rams, which ended up as the final result.

In the Rams wild-card round game against the Seattle Seahawks, with just over seven minutes left in the fourth quarter and Los Angeles leading by ten points, the Rams punted the ball away on a fourth down. However, Ebukam forced returner D. J. Reed to fumble the football, allowing the Rams to keep possession. The Los Angeles offense then scored a touchdown to take a 30–13 lead that proved insurmountable. The Rams went on to lose their next game against the Green Bay Packers, ending their season.

=== San Francisco 49ers ===
On March 19, 2021, Ebukam signed a two-year contract with the San Francisco 49ers. In the 2021 season, Ebukam had 4.5 sacks, 38 total tackles, one pass defended, and one forced fumble in 17 appearances and 11 starts.

In the 2022 season, Ebukam had five sacks, 36 total tackles, one pass defended, and one forced fumble in 15 appearances and starts.

=== Indianapolis Colts ===
On March 17, 2023, Ebukam signed a three-year contract with the Indianapolis Colts. In his first season with the Colts, Ebukam led the team with a career-high 9.5 sacks, and also set career-highs with 57 tackles and three forced fumbles.

On July 29, 2024, it was announced that Ebukam would be out for the season after suffering a torn Achilles tendon.

Ebukam returned from his injury and had two sacks, 33 tackles, and one fumble recovery in 14 games in the 2025 season.

=== Atlanta Falcons ===
On March 16, 2026, Ebukam signed a one-year, $2.7 million contract with the Atlanta Falcons.

== NFL career statistics ==
Legend
**Bold**	Career high

=== Regular season ===
Year	Team	Games		Tackles						Interceptions					Fumbles			
Year	Team	GP	GS	Cmb	Solo	Ast	TfL	Sck	Sfty	Int	Yds	Lng	TD	PD	FF	FR	Yds	TD
2017	LAR	16	2	31	26	5	2	2.0	0	0	0	0	0	0	1	0	0	0
2018	LAR	16	14	40	25	15	6	3.0	0	**1**	**25**	**25T**	1	1	**3**	**2**	**11**	**1**
2019	LAR	16	5	48	26	**22**	5	4.5	0	0	0	0	0	**4**	1	**2**	0	0
2020	LAR	16	14	31	18	13	3	4.5	0	0	0	0	0	1	1	0	0	0
2021	SF	**17**	11	38	21	17	5	4.5	0	0	0	0	0	1	1	0	0	0
2022	SF	10	10	32	18	14	5	3.5	0	0	0	0	0	0	1	1	0	0
2023	IND	**17**	**17**	**57**	**31**	18	**11**	**9.5**	0	0	0	0	0	1	**3**	0	0	0
2024	IND	Did not play due to injury																
2025	IND	14	1	33	22	11	5	2.0	0	0	0	0	0	0	0	1	0	0
2026	ATL	4	1	6	4	2	2	1.5	0	0	0	0	0	0	0	0	0	0
Career		131	80	320	202	118	45	37.5	0	1	25	25T	1	9	11	6	11	1
