= Cory Littleton =

American football player (born 1993)

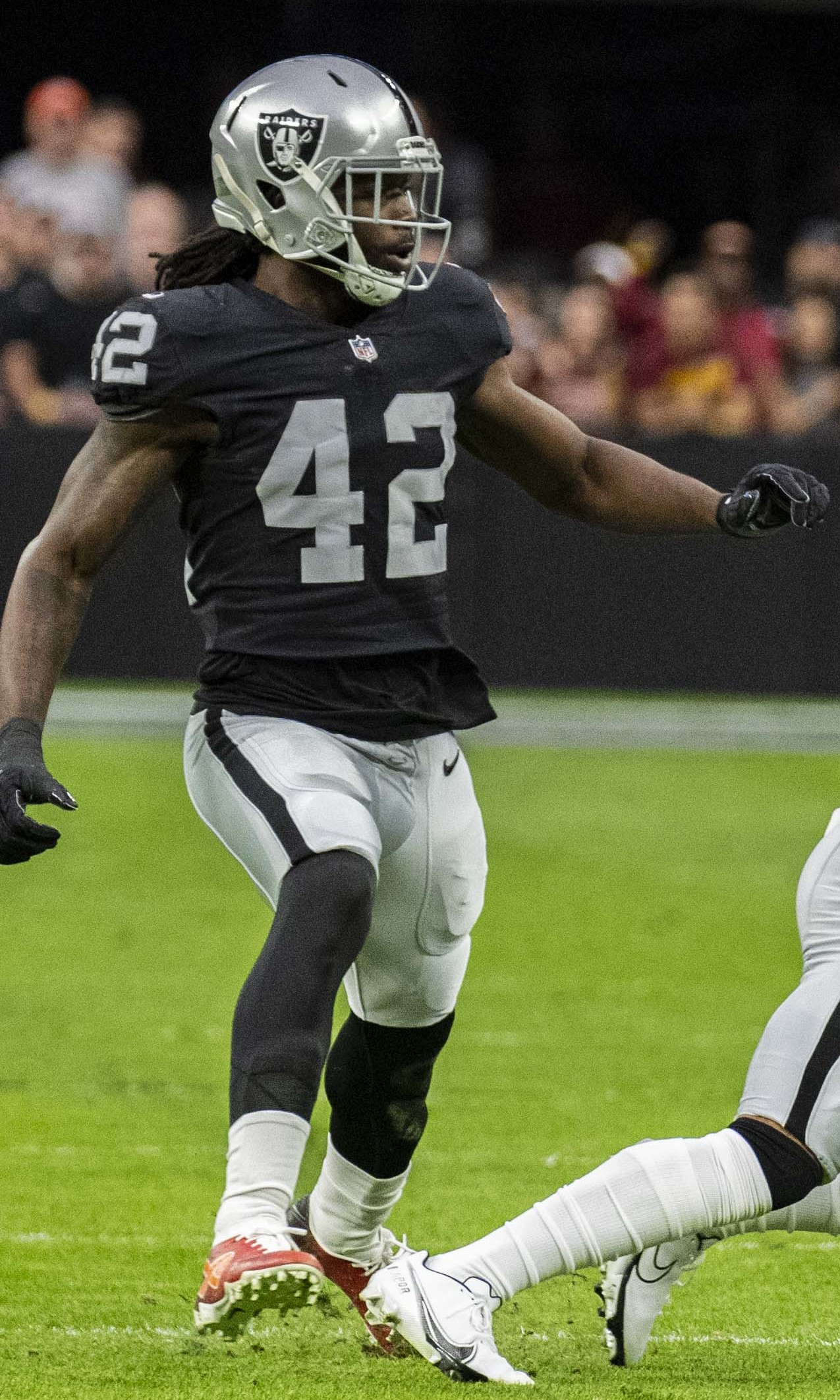
- Littleton with the Las Vegas Raiders in 2021

No. 42
- Position: Linebacker

Personal information
- Born: November 18, 1993 (age 33); Spring Valley, California, U.S.
- Listed height: 6 ft 3 in (1.91 m)
- Listed weight: 225 lb (102 kg)

Career information
- High school: Mount Miguel (Spring Valley, California)
- College: Washington (2012–2015)
- NFL draft: 2016: undrafted

Career history
- Los Angeles Rams (2016–2019); Las Vegas Raiders (2020–2021); Carolina Panthers (2022); Houston Texans (2023); New Orleans Saints (2023); Houston Texans (2023)

Awards and highlights
- Second-team All-Pro (2018) (Note: Selected for Special Teams); Pro Bowl (2018)

Career NFL statistics
- Total tackles: 543
- Sacks: 9.5
- Forced fumbles: 3
- Fumble recoveries: 5
- Interceptions: 6
- Pass deflections: 32
- Defensive touchdowns: 1
- Stats at Pro Football Reference

Cory Littleton (born November 18, 1993) is an American former professional football linebacker. He played college football for the Washington Huskies. He signed with the Los Angeles Rams as an undrafted free agent in 2016.

== College career ==
Littleton attended the University of Washington.

== Professional career ==
Pre-draft measurables
Height	Weight	Arm length	Hand span	40-yard dash	10-yard split	20-yard split	20-yard shuttle	Three-cone drill	Vertical jump	Broad jump	Bench press
6 ft 3 1/8 in (1.91 m)	238 lb (108 kg)	33 3/8 in (0.85 m)	10 1/8 in (0.26 m)	4.73 s	1.66 s	2.74 s	4.32 s	7.01 s	32.5 in (0.83 m)	9 ft 11 in (3.02 m)	17 reps
All values are from NFL Combine/Washington's Pro Day

=== Los Angeles Rams ===
==== 2016 season ====
Littleton went undrafted in the 2016 NFL draft. On May 4, 2016, the Los Angeles Rams signed Littleton to a three-year, $1.63 million contract that includes a signing bonus of $15,000 as an undrafted free agent.

Throughout training camp, Littleton competed for a roster spot as a backup outside linebacker against Josh Forrest, Cameron Lynch, Ian Seau, and Matthew Wells. Head coach Jeff Fisher named Littleton a backup outside linebacker to begin the regular season, behind Akeem Ayers and Mark Barron.

Littleton made his NFL debut in the season-opening 28–0 road loss against the San Francisco 49ers. During Week 13, he collected a season-high eight combined tackles during a 26–10 loss at the New England Patriots. The following week, he earned his first NFL start and made one tackle in the Rams' 42–14 loss against the Atlanta Falcons.

Littleton finished his rookie year with 20 combined tackles (15 solo) in 16 games and one start. He was also won the Carroll Rosenbloom Memorial Award as the team's rookie of the year.

==== 2017 season ====
On January 13, 2017, the Rams announced their decision to hire Washington Redskins' offensive coordinator Sean McVay as their new head coach. Defensive coordinator Wade Phillips installed a base 3-4 defense. During training camp, Littleton competed to be a backup inside linebacker against Josh Forrest and Bryce Hager. Head coach Sean McVay named Littleton a backup inside linebacker to begin the season, behind Mark Barron and Alec Ogletree.

Littleton ended the season strong. During Week 16, he recorded seven combined tackles, deflected a pass, made his first NFL sack and interception during a 27–23 road victory against the Tennessee Titans. The following week, he collected a season-high eight combined tackles in a 34–13 loss to the 49ers.

Littleton finished the season with 36 combined tackles (22 solo), four pass deflections, one sack, and one interception in 16 games and four starts.

The Rams finished the season atop the NFC West with an 11–5 record and qualified for the playoffs. On January 6, 2018, Littleton appeared in his first NFL playoff game and made one tackle during a 26–13 loss to the Falcons in the NFC Wildcard Game.

==== 2018 season ====
Littleton entered training camp slated as a starting inside linebacker after Ogletree was traded to the New York Giants. Head coach Sean McVay named Littleton and Mark Barron the starting inside linebackers to start the regular season, alongside outside linebackers Matt Longacre and Samson Ebukam.

Littleton started in the season-opener against the Oakland Raiders and recorded 13 combined tackles (11 solo), broke up a pass, and made an interception in a 33–13 road victory. Two weeks later against the Los Angeles Chargers, he had 10 combined tackles (5 solo), a pass deflection, and blocked a punt in the end zone that was recovered by Blake Countess for a touchdown in a 35–23 win. During a Week 7 39-10 road victory over the 49ers, Littleton again had 10 total tackles (8 solo), including two sacks. He also was credited with the first safety of his pro career after blocking a punt out of the end zone during the second quarter.

Littleton has earned high praise in his first season as a full-time defensive starter for the Rams. Head coach Sean McVay said, "Can't really understate what a great job and what an impact Cory Littleton's made." Defensive coordinator Wade Phillips also remarked, "I don't know that any linebacker is playing as well as he is in both areas. He's way ahead of everybody in the league as far as pass coverage."

On December 18, 2018, Littleton was voted to the 2019 Pro Bowl as a special-teams starter. He finished the regular season with 125 tackles, a career-high four sacks, 13 pass deflections, three interceptions, a forced fumble, and an interception that he returned for his first career defensive touchdown, in 16 games and starts.

In the divisional round of the playoffs, Littleton recorded seven tackles in a 30–22 victory against the Dallas Cowboys. The next week, he made 12 tackles in a 26–23 overtime road victory against the New Orleans Saints in the NFC Championship Game. The Rams reached Super Bowl LIII and lost 13–3 to the Patriots, while Littleton recorded 10 tackles, two passes defended, and an interception.

==== 2019 season ====
On March 12, 2019, the Rams placed a second-round restricted free agent tender on Littleton. On May 20, Littleton signed his tender for one year, $3.095 million.

In the season-opener against the Carolina Panthers, Littleton made 14 tackles and intercepted Cam Newton once in the 30–27 road victory. During Week 6 against the 49ers, he recorded a team-high 14 tackles and recovered a fumble forced on Jimmy Garoppolo in a 20–7 loss. In the next game against the Falcons, Littleton recorded an interception off Matt Ryan in the 37–10 road victory. During Week 10 against the Pittsburgh Steelers, Littleton recorded a team-high 14 tackles and recovered a fumble, forced by 49ers teammate CB Nickell Robey-Coleman on Steelers' wide receiver James Washington, in the 17–12 road loss. In the regular-season finale against the Arizona Cardinals, he sacked Kyler Murray once and recovered a fumble lost by Murray during the 31–24 win.

Littleton finished the 2019 season with a career-high 134 tackles, 3.5 sacks, nine pass deflections, two interceptions, two forced fumbles, and four fumble recoveries in 16 games and starts.

=== Las Vegas Raiders ===
On March 25, 2020, Littleton signed a three-year, $36 million contract with the Las Vegas Raiders. He was placed on the reserve/COVID-19 list by the team on November 12, and activated on November 25.

On October 4, 2021, Littleton recorded 14 total tackles during a 28–14 loss to the Los Angeles Chargers. He was released on March 15, 2022.

=== Carolina Panthers ===
On March 20, 2022, Littleton signed with the Panthers.

=== Houston Texans (first stint) ===
On March 21, 2023, Littleton signed a one-year contract with the Houston Texans. He was released on October 28, 2023.

=== New Orleans Saints ===
On November 2, 2023, Littleton was signed to the Saints practice squad.

=== Houston Texans (second stint) ===
On November 8, 2023, Littleton was signed by the Texans off the Saints practice squad. He was released on November 28, 2023.

== NFL career statistics ==
=== Regular season ===
Year	Team	Games		Tackles				Fumbles				Interceptions					
Year	Team	GP	GS	Cmb	Solo	Ast	Sck	FF	FR	Yds	TD	PD	Int	Yds	Avg	Lng	TD
2016	LAR	16	1	20	15	5	0.0	—	—	—	—	—	—	—	0.0	—	—
2017	LAR	16	4	36	22	14	1.0	1	0	0	0	4	1	2	2.0	2	0
2018	LAR	16	16	125	90	35	4.0	—	—	—	—	13	3	48	16.0	48T	1
2019	LAR	16	16	134	78	56	3.5	2	4	16	0	9	2	32	16.0	32	0
2020	LV	14	14	82	56	26	0.0	—	—	—	—	—	—	—	0.0	—	—
2021	LV	17	13	98	51	47	0.5	—	1	0	0	4	—	—	0.0	—	—
2022	CAR	15	7	47	28	19	0.5	—	—	—	—	2	—	—	0.0	—	—
Career		110	71	542	340	202	9.5	3	5	16	0	32	6	82	13.7	48T	1

=== Postseason ===
Year	Team	Games		Tackles				Fumbles				Interceptions					
Year	Team	GP	GS	Cmb	Solo	Ast	Sck	FF	FR	Yds	TD	PD	Int	Yds	Avg	Lng	TD
2017	LAR	1	0	1	1	0	0.0	—	—	—	—	—	—	—	0.0	—	—
2018	LAR	3	3	29	22	7	0.0	—	—	—	—	3	1	0	0.0	0	0
2021	LV	1	0	5	3	2	0.0	—	—	—	—	—	—	—	0.0	—	—
Career		5	3	35	26	9	0.0	0	0	0	0	3	1	0	0.0	0	0
