= Gerald Everett =

American football player (born 1994)

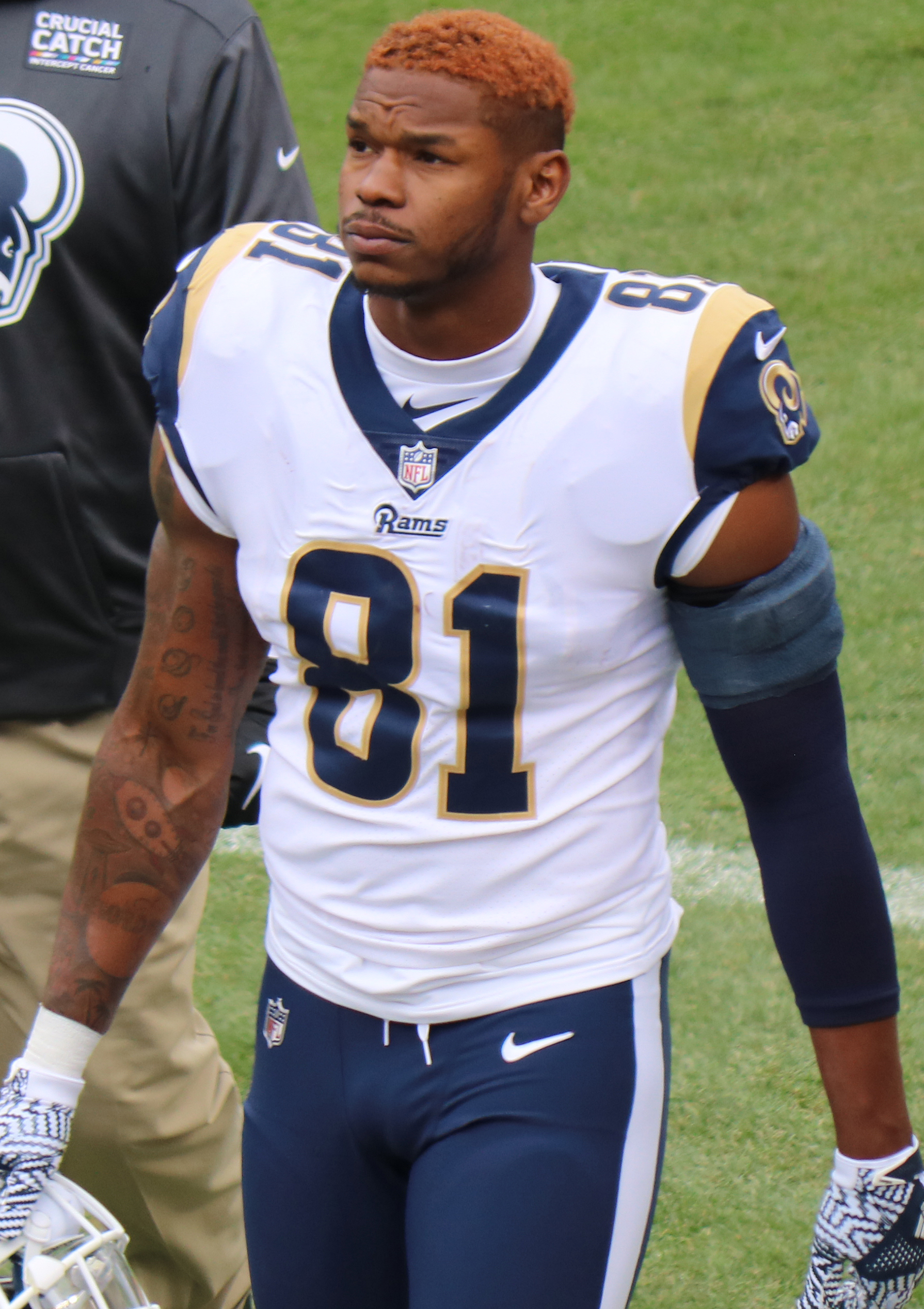
- Everett with the Los Angeles Rams in 2018

Profile
- Position: Tight end

Personal information
- Born: June 25, 1994 (age 32); Atlanta, Georgia, U.S.
- Listed height: 6 ft 3 in (1.91 m)
- Listed weight: 252 lb (114 kg)

Career information
- High school: Columbia (Decatur, Georgia)
- College: Bethune–Cookman (2012); Hutchinson CC (2013); UAB (2014); South Alabama (2015–2016)
- NFL draft: 2017: 2nd round, 44th overall pick

Career history
- Los Angeles Rams (2017–2020); Seattle Seahawks (2021); Los Angeles Chargers (2022–2023); Chicago Bears (2024)

Awards and highlights
- 2× First-team All-Sun Belt (2015, 2016)

Career NFL statistics
- Receptions: 292
- Receiving yards: 2,869
- Receiving touchdowns: 19
- Stats at Pro Football Reference

Gerald Rashard Everett (born June 25, 1994) is an American professional football tight end. He played college football for the Bethune–Cookman Wildcats, Hutchinson Blue Dragons, UAB Blazers, and South Alabama Jaguars, and was selected by the Los Angeles Rams in the second round of the 2017 NFL draft. He has also played for the Seattle Seahawks, Los Angeles Chargers, and Chicago Bears.

== Early life ==
Gerald Rashard Everett was born on June 25, 1994, in Atlanta, Georgia. He attended and graduated from Columbia High School in Decatur, Georgia. He grew up playing youth sports at Gresham Park Recreation Complex. He played three seasons of high school basketball and ran track for the Eagles and did not play football for the Eagles until his senior year.

== College career ==
Everett attended Hutchinson Community College in 2013 and the University of Alabama at Birmingham (UAB) in 2014. After the UAB football program was shut down, he transferred to the University of South Alabama in 2015 where he played for coach Joey Jones's South Alabama Jaguars football team from 2015 to 2016. In his two years at South Alabama, he had 41 receptions for 575 yards and eight touchdowns and earned first-team All-Sun Belt notice as a junior and 49 receptions for 717 yards and four touchdowns as a senior. Everett received an invitation to the Senior Bowl.

== Professional career ==
=== Pre-draft ===
Everett received an invitation to the Senior Bowl. He helped the South defeat the North 16–15 and made one catch for six yards. Unfortunately, he tied Donnel Pumphrey, who stands at 5'8", for the smallest hand of any pass catcher at the Senior Bowl. He attended the NFL Combine and completed all of the required combine drills. Everett also attended South Alabama's Pro Day and opted to re-try the short shuttle and broad jump, but was unable to beat his combine numbers in both categories. NFL draft experts and analysts projected him to be a second or third round pick in the draft. He was ranked the fourth-best tight end in the draft by ESPN and NFL media analyst Mike Mayock, the fifth-best tight end by NFLDraftScout.com, and was ranked the sixth-best tight end in the draft by Sports Illustrated.

Pre-draft measurables
| Height | Weight | Arm length | Hand span | Wingspan | 40-yard dash | 10-yard split | 20-yard split | 20-yard shuttle | Three-cone drill | Vertical jump | Broad jump | Bench press | Wonderlic |
|---|---|---|---|---|---|---|---|---|---|---|---|---|---|
| 6 ft 3 in (1.91 m) | 239 lb (108 kg) | 33 in (0.84 m) | 8 1/2 in (0.22 m) | 6 ft 7 3/4 in (2.03 m) | 4.62 s | 1.53 s | 2.67 s | 4.33 s | 6.99 s | 37.5 in (0.95 m) | 10 ft 6 in (3.20 m) | 22 reps | 24 |
All values from NFL Combine

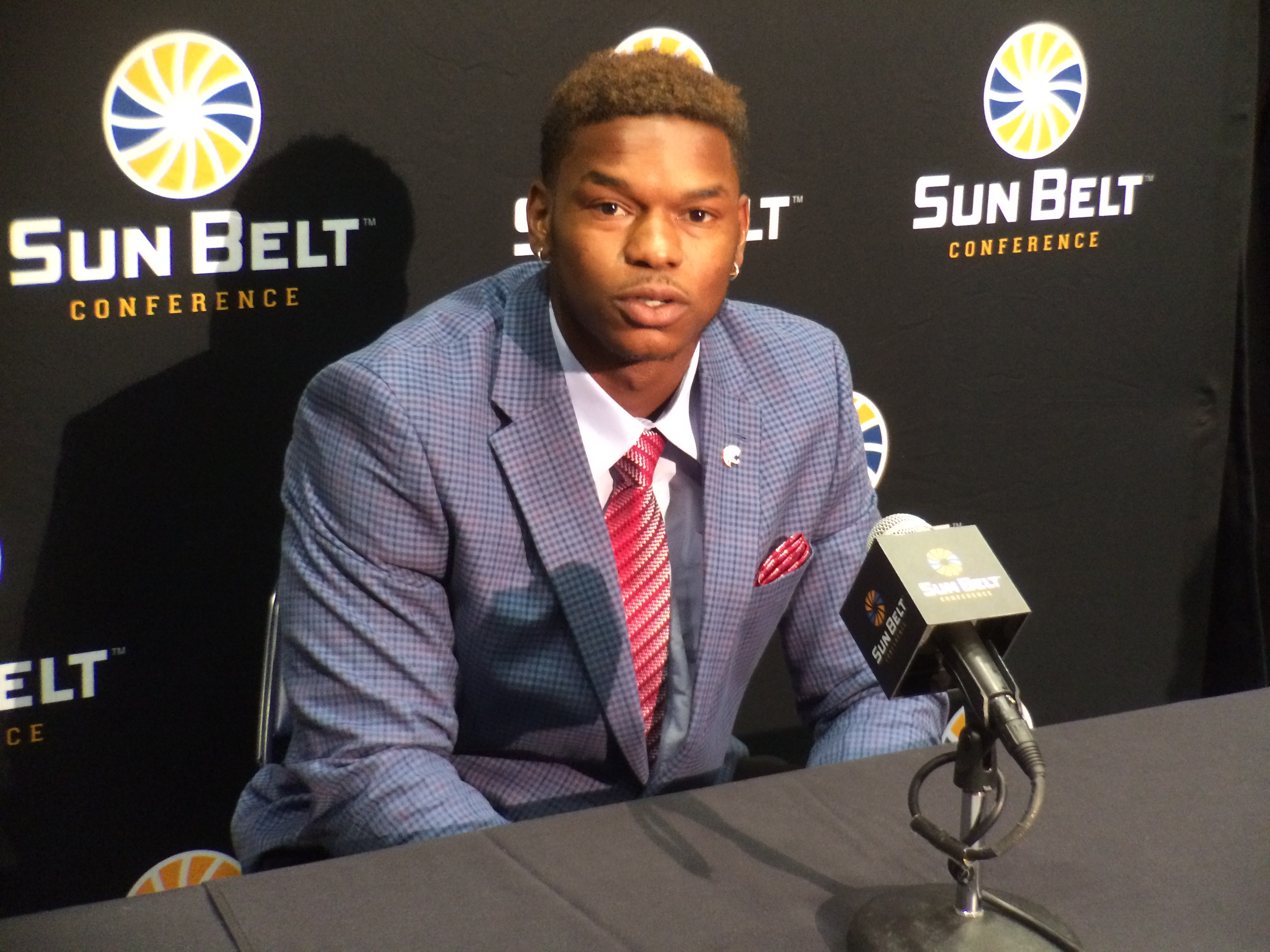
Everett at the 2016 Sun Belt Media Day

=== Los Angeles Rams ===
==== 2017 season ====
Everett was selected in the second round with the 44th overall pick by the Los Angeles Rams, in the 2017 NFL draft. He was the fourth tight end selected in the draft and first player ever to be drafted from South Alabama.

On June 13, 2017, the Rams signed Everett to a four-year, $6.04 million contract that includes $3.27 million guaranteed and a signing bonus of $2.53 million.

Everett made his NFL debut in the Rams' season-opener against the Indianapolis Colts and caught his first NFL reception on a 39-yard pass from quarterback Jared Goff during a 46–9 victory. The following game, he caught a season-high three receptions for 95 yards in the Rams' 27–20 loss to the Washington Redskins. On October 15, 2017, Everett recorded his first NFL touchdown on a four-yard reception from Goff in a 27–17 road victory against the Jacksonville Jaguars.

Everett finished his rookie year with 16 receptions for 244 yards and two touchdowns. He made his playoff debut in the Wild Card Round against the Atlanta Falcons. He had a four-yard reception in the 26–13 loss.

==== 2018 season ====
Everett was a significant contributor in the Rams' narrow 54–51 victory over the Kansas City Chiefs on Monday Night Football in Week 11, catching two touchdowns in the fourth quarter. In the 2018 season, Everett finished with 33 receptions for 320 yards and three touchdowns.

In the NFC Championship, he had two receptions for 50 yards in the 26–23 overtime victory over the New Orleans Saints. Everett was targeted once in Super Bowl LIII but had no receptions in the 13–3 loss to the New England Patriots.

==== 2019 season ====
During Week 5 on Thursday Night Football against the Seattle Seahawks, Everett finished with 136 receiving yards, marking his first 100-plus yard game in his NFL career, but the Rams narrowly lost by a score of 29–30. Overall, he appeared in 13 games in the 2019 season and recorded 37 receptions for 408 receiving yards and two receiving touchdowns.

==== 2020 season ====
In Week 4 of the 2020 season, Everett recorded his first career rushing touchdown in the 17–9 victory over the New York Giants. In the 2020 season, Everett appeared in 16 games and recorded 41 receptions for 417 receiving yards and one receiving touchdown.

=== Seattle Seahawks ===
On March 21, 2021, Everett signed a one-year contract with the Seahawks. He played in 15 games with 12 starts, recording a career-high 48 catches for 478 yards and four touchdowns.

=== Los Angeles Chargers ===
On March 22, 2022, Everett signed a two-year, $12 million contract with the Los Angeles Chargers. In 2022, Everett played in 16 games with 11 starts and set new career highs for receptions (58) and yardage (555) while equaling his career best in touchdown catches (four). Against the Jaguars in an American Football Conference Wild Card Game, Everett caught six passes for 109 yards and a touchdown in the Chargers' 31–30 loss. The following season, he started 10 games and played in 13 and caught 46 passes for 376 yards and three touchdowns.

=== Chicago Bears ===
On March 15, 2024, Everett signed a two-year contract with the Chicago Bears. In the 2024 season, he appeared in 17 games and started four. He had eight receptions for 36 yards. On February 21, 2025, Everett was released by the Bears.

== Career statistics ==
=== NFL ===
==== Regular season ====
| Year | Team | Games | | Receiving | | | | | Rushing | | | | | Fumbles | |
| Year | Team | GP | GS | Rec | Yds | Avg | Lng | TD | Att | Yds | Avg | Lng | TD | Fum | Lost |
|---|---|---|---|---|---|---|---|---|---|---|---|---|---|---|---|
| 2017 | LAR | 16 | 2 | 16 | 244 | 15.3 | 69 | 2 | 1 | 13 | 13.0 | 13 | 0 | 1 | 1 |
| 2018 | LAR | 16 | 0 | 33 | 320 | 9.7 | 40T | 3 | 2 | 16 | 8.0 | 12 | 0 | 0 | 0 |
| 2019 | LAR | 13 | 2 | 37 | 408 | 11.0 | 33 | 2 | 1 | 0 | 0.0 | 0 | 0 | 0 | 0 |
| 2020 | LAR | 16 | 7 | 41 | 417 | 10.2 | 40 | 1 | 1 | 2 | 2.0 | 2 | 1 | 1 | 1 |
| 2021 | SEA | 15 | 12 | 48 | 478 | 10.0 | 41 | 4 | 3 | 20 | 6.7 | 13 | 0 | 2 | 2 |
| 2022 | LAC | 16 | 11 | 58 | 555 | 9.6 | 26 | 4 | 1 | 0 | 0.0 | 0 | 0 | 0 | 0 |
| 2023 | LAC | 15 | 12 | 51 | 411 | 8.1 | 31 | 3 | 3 | 10 | 3.3 | 6 | 0 | 3 | 0 |
| 2024 | CHI | 17 | 4 | 8 | 36 | 4.5 | 17 | 0 | 0 | 0 | 0.0 | 0 | 0 | 0 | 0 |
| Career | | 124 | 50 | 292 | 2,869 | 9.8 | 69 | 19 | 12 | 61 | 5.1 | 13 | 1 | 7 | 4 |

==== Postseason ====
| Year | Team | Games | | Receiving | | | | | Fumbles | |
| Year | Team | GP | GS | Rec | Yds | Avg | Lng | TD | Fum | Lost |
|---|---|---|---|---|---|---|---|---|---|---|
| 2017 | LAR | 1 | 0 | 1 | 4 | 4.0 | 4 | 0 | 0 | 0 |
| 2018 | LAR | 3 | 1 | 2 | 50 | 25.0 | 39 | 0 | 0 | 0 |
| 2020 | LAR | 2 | 1 | 0 | 0 | 0.0 | 0 | 0 | 0 | 0 |
| 2022 | LAC | 1 | 1 | 6 | 109 | 18.2 | 25 | 1 | 0 | 0 |
| Total | | 7 | 3 | 9 | 163 | 18.1 | 39 | 1 | 0 | 0 |

=== College ===
| Season | Team | GP | Receiving | | | |
| Season | Team | GP | Rec | Yds | Avg | TD |
|---|---|---|---|---|---|---|
| 2014 | UAB | 7 | 17 | 292 | 17.2 | 1 |
| 2015 | South Alabama | 12 | 41 | 575 | 14.0 | 8 |
| 2016 | South Alabama | 12 | 49 | 717 | 14.6 | 4 |
| Career | | 31 | 107 | 1,584 | 14.8 | 13 |
