= Andy Dickerson =

American football coach (born 1982)

Personal information
- Born: January 29, 1982 (age 44); Wilmington, Delaware, U.S.

Career information
- High school: Tower Hill School (Wilmington)
- College: Tufts (1999–2002)

Career history
- Washington Redskins (2003) Training camp intern; Tufts (2003) Graduate assistant; New England Patriots (2004–2005) Operations department intern (2004) Operations department employee (2005); New York Jets (2006–2008) Coaching assistant / defensive quality control coach; Cleveland Browns (2009–2010) Defensive quality control coach (2009) Assistant offensive line coach (2010); New York Jets (2011) Coaching assistant; St. Louis / Los Angeles Rams (2012–2020) Assistant offensive line coach; Seattle Seahawks (2021–2023) Offensive run game coordinator (2021) Offensive line coach (2022–2023); Cleveland Browns (2024) Offensive line coach; Las Vegas Raiders (2025) Assistant offensive line coach

Andy Dickerson (born January 29, 1982) is an American football coach and former college player who most recently served as the assistant offensive line coach for the Las Vegas Raiders of the National Football League (NFL). He played college football for the Tufts Jumbos and has previously had coaching stints with the Washington Redskins, New England Patriots, New York Jets, St. Louis / Los Angeles Rams, Seattle Seahawks, and Cleveland Browns.

== Early life and education ==
Dickerson was born on January 29, 1982, and grew up in Wilmington, Delaware. He attended Tower Hill School in his hometown and was team captain in three sports: wrestling, football and track and field. He later attended Tufts University. He also was a member of the Tufts track and field team, specializing in the hammer throw, discus throw and shot put. He graduated from Tufts in 2003 with a master's degree in education.

== Coaching career ==
Dickerson served as a training camp intern for the Washington Redskins of the National Football League (NFL) in 2003, later returning that year to Tufts as a graduate assistant. He was an intern in the New England Patriots operations department in 2004 and became a full-time member of the department in 2005. He won Super Bowl XXXIX with the Patriots in 2004.

From 2006 to 2008, Dickerson served with the New York Jets as their defensive quality control coach and a coaching assistant. He joined the Cleveland Browns as defensive quality control coach in 2009 and in 2010 was their assistant offensive line coach. He returned to the Jets in 2011 as a coaching assistant. He then became the assistant offensive line coach for the St. Louis Rams (later Los Angeles Rams) in 2012. He remained the team's assistant offensive line coach through 2020 and helped them reach the Super Bowl in 2018. At the time of his departure, he was the longest-tenured coach on the team.

Dickerson became the run game coordinator for the Seattle Seahawks in 2021, following Shane Waldron whom he played with at Tufts and coached with at New England and Los Angeles. He was promoted to offensive line coach in 2022. He was interviewed in 2024 to be the offensive coordinator for the Cleveland Browns and he later joined the team as offensive line coach. After one season where there was significant regression with the Browns' offensive line, Dickerson was fired on January 5, 2025.

On February 11, 2025, the Las Vegas Raiders hired Dickerson to serve as their assistant offensive line coach.
