= Darrell Williams (American football) =

American football player (born 1993)

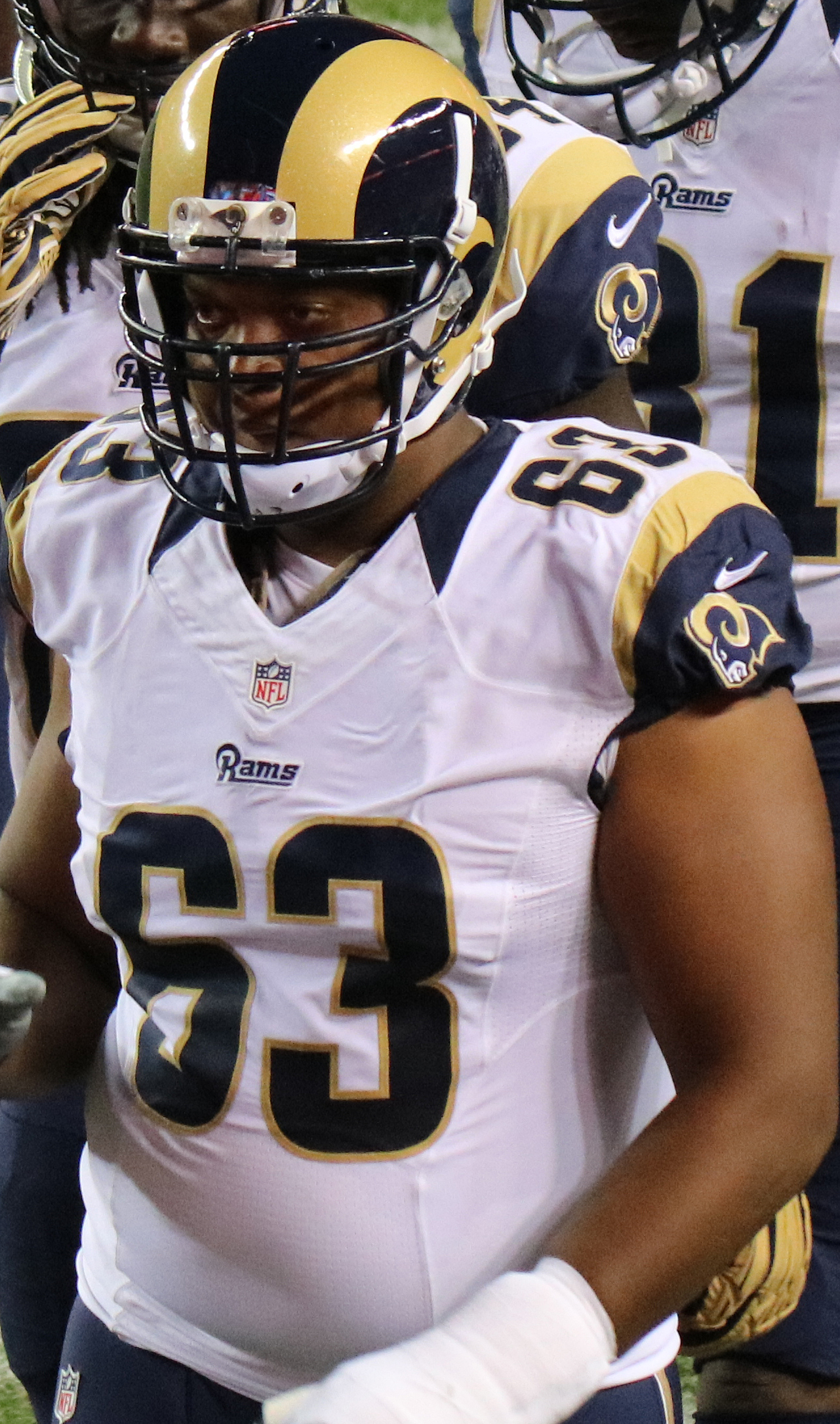
- Williams with the Los Angeles Rams in 2016

No. 63, 65
- Position: Offensive tackle

Personal information
- Born: August 3, 1993 (age 33); Kingston, Jamaica
- Listed height: 6 ft 5 in (1.96 m)
- Listed weight: 305 lb (138 kg)

Career information
- High school: Maynard Evans (Orlando, Florida, U.S.)
- College: South Florida (2011–2014)
- NFL draft: 2015: undrafted

Career history
- St. Louis / Los Angeles Rams (2015–2017); Hamilton Tiger-Cats (2019)*; Winnipeg Blue Bombers (2019)
- * Offseason or practice squad member only

Career NFL statistics
- Games played: 21
- Games started: 1
- Stats at Pro Football Reference

Darrell Williams (born August 3, 1993) is an American former professional football player who was an offensive tackle in the National Football League (NFL). He played college football for the South Florida Bulls. He signed with the St. Louis Rams as an undrafted free agent in 2015.

== College career ==
Williams attended and played college football at University of South Florida from 2011 to 2014.

== Professional career ==
=== St. Louis / Los Angeles Rams ===
After going undrafted in the 2015 NFL draft, Williams signed with the St. Louis Rams on May 8, 2015, as an undrafted free agent. On November 17, 2015, he was placed on injured reserve due to a dislocated wrist.

On September 3, 2016, Williams was placed on injured reserve.

In 2017, Williams played in all 16 games, including one start at right tackle.

On April 16, 2018, Williams re-signed with the Rams. He was waived on August 31, 2018.

=== Canadian Football League ===
Williams signed with the Hamilton Tiger-Cats on May 10, 2019. He was released before the start of the regular season on June 11, 2019. He signed to the practice roster of the Winnipeg Blue Bombers two days later, and was promoted to the active roster on October 4, 2019. He was placed on the retired list on July 10, 2020.
