= Tyrunn Walker =

American football player (born 1990)

No. 75, 93, 73, 95
- Position: Nose tackle

Personal information
- Born: March 18, 1990 (age 36); New Iberia, Louisiana, U.S.
- Listed height: 6 ft 3 in (1.91 m)
- Listed weight: 310 lb (141 kg)

Career information
- High school: Westgate (New Iberia, Louisiana)
- College: Tulsa
- NFL draft: 2012: undrafted

Career history
- New Orleans Saints (2012–2014); Detroit Lions (2015–2016); Los Angeles Rams (2017); Buffalo Bills (2018)*; New Orleans Saints (2018)
- * Offseason or practice squad member only

Awards and highlights
- First-team All-C-USA (2011)

Career NFL statistics
- Total tackles: 85
- Sacks: 4.5
- Forced fumbles: 2
- Fumble recoveries: 2
- Stats at Pro Football Reference

Tyrunn Walker (born March 18, 1990) is an American former professional football player who was a nose tackle in the National Football League (NFL). He played college football for the Tulsa Golden Hurricane and signed with the New Orleans Saints as an undrafted free agent in 2012. He has also played for the Detroit Lions, Los Angeles Rams, and Buffalo Bills.

== College career ==
Walker played college football at Jones County Junior College before transferring to the University of Tulsa for his junior season. In his two seasons at Tulsa, he finished with 84 tackles, 13.5 sacks, 11 pass deflections, and 4 forced fumbles.

== Professional career ==
Pre-draft measurables
Height	Weight	40-yard dash	10-yard split	20-yard split	20-yard shuttle	Three-cone drill	Vertical jump	Broad jump	Bench press
6 ft 3 3/4 in (1.92 m)	298 lb (135 kg)	4.91 s	1.79 s	2.84 s	4.83 s	7.37 s	28.0 in (0.71 m)	9 ft 4 in (2.84 m)	20 reps
All values from Pro Day

=== New Orleans Saints ===
On April 30, 2012, he signed with the New Orleans Saints as an undrafted free agent. Against the odds, Walker made the final 53-man roster. However, he was a healthy inactive or did not play in all 16 of the team's regular season games.

The next year, Walker played in seven games and recorded nine tackles, one sack, and one pass defensed.

In the 2014 season, Walker played all 16 games, starting one, and tallied 19 tackles, 2.5 sacks, and one forced fumble.

=== Detroit Lions ===
On March 12, 2015, Walker signed a one-year contract with the Detroit Lions. During the 2015 season, he played in four games for Detroit and posted nine tackles before he suffered a broken fibula in a game on October 5 of that year and was placed on the injured reserve list for the remainder of the season. On March 4, 2016, the Lions re-signed Walker to a one-year contract. During the 2016 regular season, Walker played in 15 games, starting eight. He was involved in an unusual play during a Week 9 game against the Minnesota Vikings when he batted a Sam Bradford pass back to the quarterback Bradford, who caught the ball and ran for a five-yard gain. Walker finished the season with 26 tackles and one fumble recovered as the Lions made the playoffs. Walker recorded one tackle in the Lions' wild-card round game as they lost to the Seattle Seahawks by a score of 26–6.

=== Los Angeles Rams ===
On March 23, 2017, Walker signed with the Los Angeles Rams. He was released on June 22, but re-signed with the Rams on August 23. During the regular season, Walker played in 16 games, starting four, and recorded 22 tackles, four passes defensed, one forced fumble, one fumble recovery, and one sack as the Rams made the playoffs. Walker recorded three tackles in the Rams' wild-card round game as they lost to the Atlanta Falcons by a score of 26-13.

=== Buffalo Bills ===
On August 12, 2018, Walker was signed by the Buffalo Bills. He was released by the Bills on September 1.

=== New Orleans Saints (second stint) ===
On January 15, 2019, Walker was signed by the New Orleans Saints after defensive tackle Sheldon Rankins was injured during a playoff game against the Philadelphia Eagles. He was listed as inactive for their next game, a loss to the Los Angeles Rams in the NFC Championship Game.
