= Carlos Thompson (American football) =

American football player (born 1992)

No. 44, 53
- Position: linebacker

Personal information
- Born: February 16, 1992 (age 34); Greenville, Mississippi
- Listed height: 6 ft 5 in (1.96 m)
- Listed weight: 243 lb (110 kg)

Career information
- High school: Simmons (Hollandale, Mississippi)
- College: Ole Miss
- NFL draft: 2015: undrafted

Career history
- Houston Texans (2015); Los Angeles Rams (2017–2018)
- Stats at Pro Football Reference

Carlos Thompson (born February 16, 1992) is an American former football outside linebacker. He was signed by the Houston Texans as an undrafted free agent in 2015. He played college football at Ole Miss as a defensive end.

== Professional career ==
=== Houston Texans ===
Thompson signed with the Houston Texans after going undrafted in the 2015 NFL draft.

On August 30, 2016, Thompson was waived by the Texans.

=== Los Angeles Rams ===
On April 5, 2017, Thompson signed with the Los Angeles Rams. He was waived on September 2, 2017, and was signed to the Rams' practice squad the next day. He was promoted to the active roster on December 2, 2017.

On May 14, 2018, Thompson was waived/injured by the Rams and placed on injured reserve. He was released on October 3, 2018.
