= Matt Longacre =

American football player (born 1991)

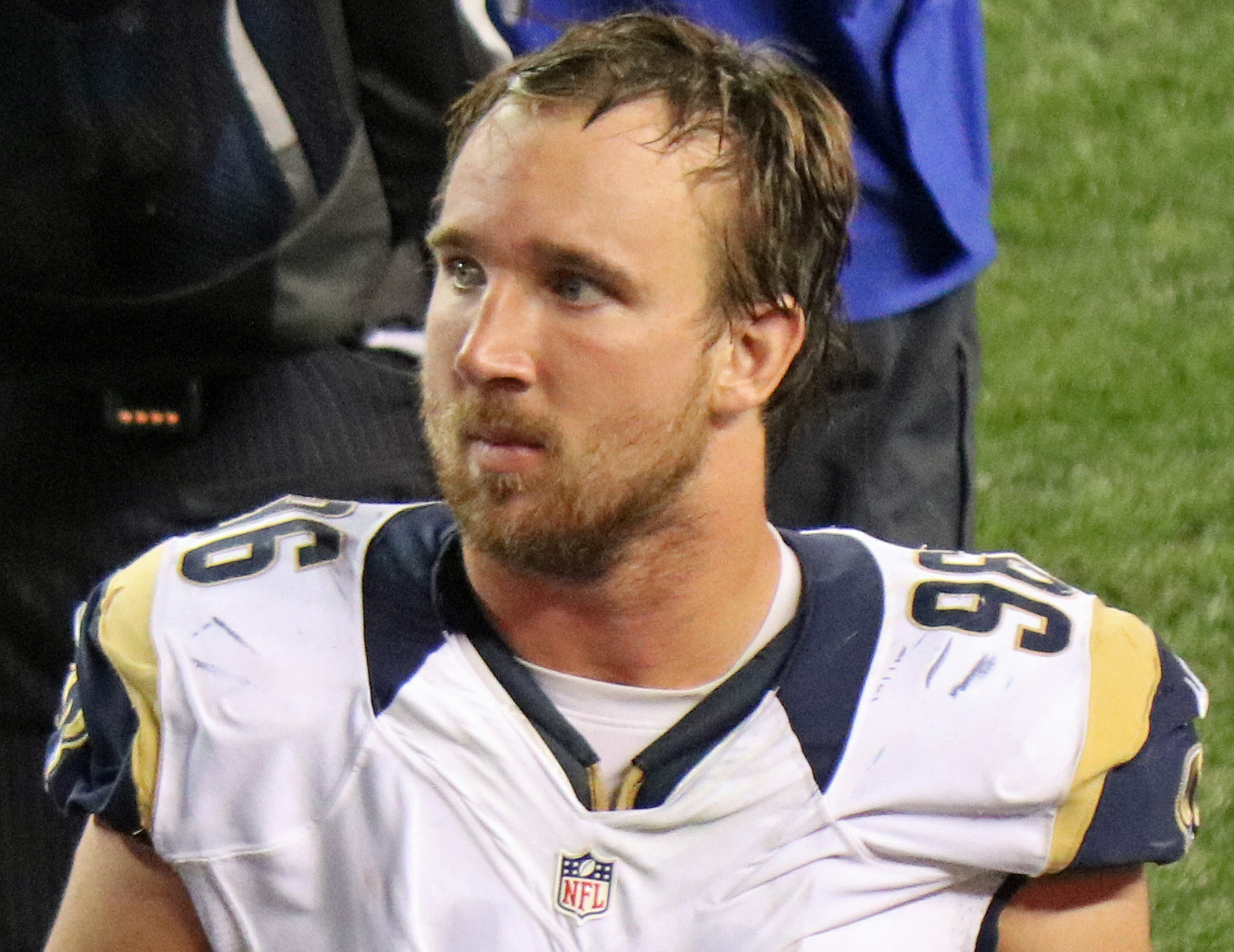
- Longacre with the Los Angeles Rams in 2016

No. 96
- Position: Linebacker

Personal information
- Born: September 21, 1991 (age 35); Omaha, Nebraska, U.S.
- Listed height: 6 ft 3 in (1.91 m)
- Listed weight: 265 lb (120 kg)

Career information
- High school: Millard West (Omaha)
- College: Northwest Missouri State (2010–2014)
- NFL draft: 2015: undrafted

Career history
- St. Louis / Los Angeles Rams (2015–2018); Arizona Cardinals (2019)*
- * Offseason or practice squad member only

Awards and highlights
- MIAA Defensive Player of the Year (2014); MIAA All-America (2014)

Career NFL statistics
- Games played: 38
- Total tackles: 57
- Sacks: 6.5
- Forced fumbles: 1
- Fumble recoveries: 1
- Stats at Pro Football Reference

Matthew Allan Longacre (born September 21, 1991) is an American former professional football player who was a linebacker in the National Football League (NFL). He played college football for the Northwest Missouri State Bearcats and signed with the St. Louis Rams as an undrafted free agent in 2015.

== College career ==
Longacre attended and played college football at Northwest Missouri State University, where he was named All-America defensive player of the year in 2013. He was first-team All American in 2013 and 2014. The Bearcats won the 2013 NCAA Division II national championship. At the time he was ranked second all-time in school history sacks (30.5) and tackles-for-loss (47.0).

== Professional career ==
Pre-draft measurables
Height	Weight	40-yard dash	10-yard split	20-yard split	20-yard shuttle	Three-cone drill	Vertical jump	Broad jump	Bench press
6 ft 3 1/4 in (1.91 m)	260 lb (118 kg)	4.75 s	1.66 s	2.72 s	4.26 s	7.07 s	33 in (0.84 m)	9 ft 9 in (2.97 m)	22 reps
All values from Northwest Missouri State Pro Day

=== Los Angeles Rams ===
After going undrafted in the 2015 NFL draft, Longacre signed with the St. Louis Rams on May 8, 2015. He was waived by the Rams on September 5, 2015, and was signed to the practice squad the next day. On November 6, he was promoted to the active roster.

In the 2017 season, Longacre played in 14 games, recording 23 tackles and 5.5 sacks. He was placed on injured reserve on December 27, 2017, with a back injury.

On April 16, 2018, Longacre sign his restricted free agent tender. He played 13 games in the 2018 season, finishing with 17 tackles and a sack.

=== Arizona Cardinals ===
On July 24, 2019, Longacre signed with the Arizona Cardinals. After only four days on the team, he was released by the Cardinals.
