= Les Snead =

American football executive (born 1971)

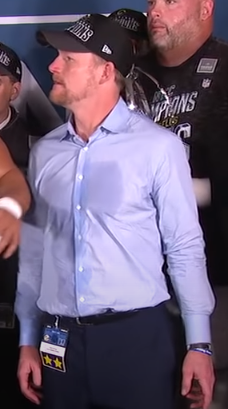
- Snead in 2019

Los Angeles Rams
- Title: General manager

Personal information
- Born: January 19, 1971 (age 55); Eufaula, Alabama, U.S.

Career information
- Position: Tight end
- High school: Eufaula
- College: Auburn

Career history
- Auburn (1993–1994) Graduate assistant; Jacksonville Jaguars (1995–1997) Pro scout; Atlanta Falcons (1998–2011); Pro scout (1998–2008); Director of player personnel (2009–2011); St. Louis / Los Angeles Rams (2012–present) General manager

Awards and highlights
- As an executive: Super Bowl champion (LVI)
- Executive profile at Pro Football Reference

Samuel Lester Snead (born January 19, 1971) is an American professional football executive who is the general manager of the Los Angeles Rams of the National Football League (NFL). He was hired by the team in 2012. Prior to joining the Rams, Snead served in the Jacksonville Jaguars and Atlanta Falcons front offices in executive roles from 1995 to 2011.

== Early life ==
Snead was born and grew up in Eufaula, Alabama and was an all-state offensive guard at Eufaula High School. He switched to tight end at Troy State before attending the University of Alabama at Birmingham and earning a varsity letter for playing on the first NCAA-sanctioned Division III UAB Blazers football team. He then transferred to Auburn. After Snead served as a graduate assistant at Auburn, he became a scout.

== Professional career ==
=== Early Scouting Career ===
In 1995, Snead was hired by the expansion Jacksonville Jaguars as a pro scout, where he worked until 1997, when he was hired by the Atlanta Falcons to the same position. In 2009, he was promoted to director of pro/player personnel, where he remained for the following two seasons.

=== St Louis Rams ===
On February 10, 2012, the St. Louis Rams announced their decision to hire Snead to takeover as their new General Manager.

On March 12, 2012, Snead orchestrated his first significant deal, agreeing for the Rams to trade their 2012 first-round pick (2nd overall) to the Washington Redskins and in return, the Rams received a 2012 first (6th overall) and second-round pick, a 2013 first-round pick (22nd overall), and their 2014 first-round pick (2nd overall). He would trade the Rams' 2012 first-round (6th overall) to the Dallas Cowboys in exchange for their 2012 first (14th overall) and second-round picks (45th overall). The 2012 second-round pick (45th overall) was immediately traded to the Chicago Bears in exchange for their 2012 second (50th overall) and fifth-round picks (150th overall).

In the draft the Rams traded the sixth pick for the Dallas Cowboys' 14th pick, and selected defensive tackle Michael Brockers. Snead used the Rams' second-round pick (39th overall) to select cornerback Janoris Jenkins. In the sixth round, Snead and the Rams used the 171st overall pick to select future All-Pro kicker Greg Zuerlein. Snead also signed rookie free agent Johnny Hekker, destined to become a perennial All-Pro punter.

In the 2014 NFL draft, Snead had two first-round picks, in which he selected Auburn offensive tackle Greg Robinson with the No. 2 overall pick and then Pittsburgh defensive tackle Aaron Donald at No. 13. While Robinson was traded away after three disappointing seasons, Donald quickly emerged as one of the NFL's most dominant defensive players, earning NFL Defensive Rookie of the Year in 2014 and being named NFL Defensive Player of the Year in 2017, 2018, and 2020. Later in the draft, Snead and the Rams drafted defensive end Michael Sam of Missouri, the first openly gay player to enter the NFL draft, with their third seventh-round draft pick (No. 249 overall). Ultimately, Sam did not make the team's regular season roster. Despite lingering concerns over a surgically repaired knee after a torn ACL, Snead gambled and selected Georgia running back Todd Gurley with the 10th overall pick in the 2015 NFL draft. The gamble paid off, as Gurley earned NFL Offensive Rookie of the Year honors by rushing for 1,106 yards and 10 touchdowns despite missing three full games and most of another. Offensive tackle Rob Havenstein was also selected in the second round (No. 57 overall) and has been a Rams starter since his rookie season.

=== Los Angeles Rams ===
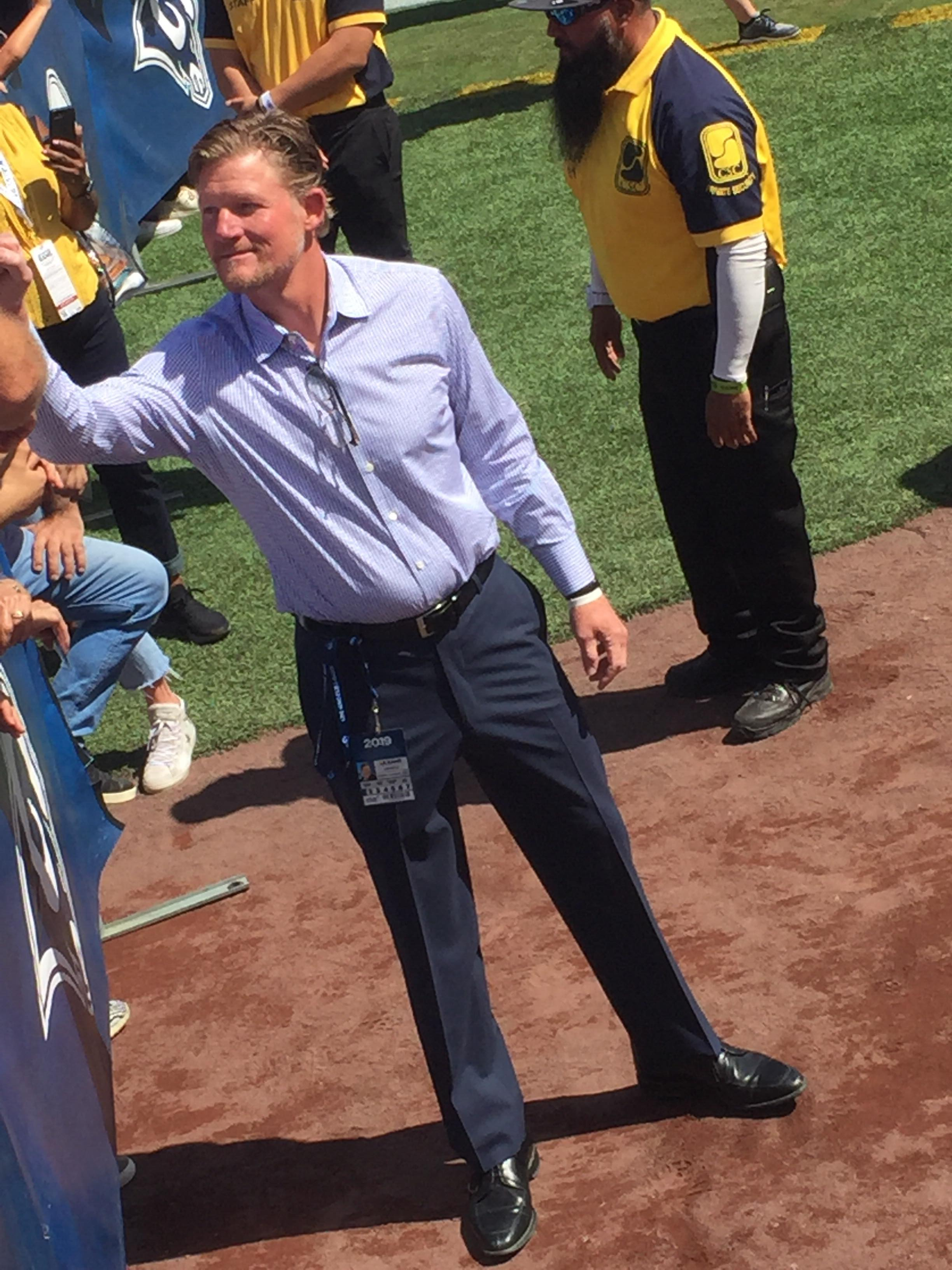
Snead greets fans at the Los Angeles Memorial Coliseum prior to a 2019 game

Following the approval of the Rams' relocation to Los Angeles, Snead and his family settled in Malibu. Just prior to the 2016 NFL draft, the Rams announced a blockbuster trade with the Tennessee Titans, in which Los Angeles acquired the No. 1 overall pick from Tennessee along with fourth and sixth round selections in exchange for the Rams' No. 15 overall pick, two second-round picks, and a third-round pick. The Titans also received the Rams' first- and third-round picks in 2017. With the first pick in the draft, Snead and Rams head coach Jeff Fisher selected Cal quarterback Jared Goff, later to become a Pro Bowler for the Rams. Fourth round pick Tyler Higbee, a tight end from Western Kentucky, was also selected in the draft and became a regular starter. However, as the Rams' first season back in Los Angeles unraveled into a 4-12 mess, the relationship between Snead and Fisher began to deteriorate publicly. Fisher, who was fired with three games to go in the season, chided Snead for losing defensive backfield starters Janoris Jenkins and Rodney McLeod in free agency. Following the end of the 2016 season, it was uncertain if the Rams would retain Snead, who, like Fisher, had signed a two-year extension in early December.

Snead was among the team executives who interviewed Sean McVay for the vacant head coaching position, and was the first to speak following McVay's impressive interview, declaring, "I'm buying stock in Sean McVay." In 2017, Snead signed key veteran free agents including wide receiver Robert Woods and offensive tackle Andrew Whitworth, traded for wide receiver Sammy Watkins, and had a very productive 2017 NFL draft selecting tight end Gerald Everett, wide receiver Cooper Kupp, safety John Johnson, wide receiver Josh Reynolds, and linebacker Samson Ebukam. Rebuilding the roster was instrumental in the Rams' 11–5 season, which included their first NFC West title since 2003 and a trip to the playoffs. The success continued in 2018, as the Rams improved to 13–3, earning their second straight NFC West title, an NFC Championship and a berth in Super Bowl LIII. Key personnel acquisitions by Snead before and during that season included trades for wide receiver Brandin Cooks, cornerbacks Marcus Peters and Aqib Talib, and linebacker Dante Fowler, as well as signing veteran stars Todd Gurley and Aaron Donald to long-term contracts. In 2019, Snead made a blockbuster trade, sending a 2020 first-round pick, a 2021 first-round pick, and a 2021 fourth-round pick to the Jacksonville Jaguars for star cornerback Jalen Ramsey.

Finding a close alignment in their respective football philosophies, Snead and McVay have since had a strong friendship. In May 2019, they attended the Kentucky Derby together. In July 2019, the Los Angeles Rams signed Snead to a contract extension that would keep him with the franchise through the 2023 season.

Snead tested positive for COVID-19 during the 2021 NFL draft and was forced to self-isolate for the remainder of the draft.

After the Rams were eliminated in the 2020-21 NFL playoffs, Snead faced some criticism for the massive contract he signed Goff to after their Super Bowl berth. Facing pressure to win now, Snead swung a blockbuster trade, sending Goff, a 2021 third-round pick, a 2022 first-round pick, and a 2023 first-round pick to the Detroit Lions for quarterback Matthew Stafford. During the offseason, Snead signed wide receiver DeSean Jackson and traded a 2022 fifth-round pick and a 2022 sixth-round pick to the New England Patriots for running back Sony Michel. As the season progressed, Snead became well-known league-wide for his tendency to make big moves. In November, Snead made another blockbuster trade, sending a 2022 second-round pick and a 2022 third-round pick to the Denver Broncos for star pass rusher Von Miller. And when Jackson was released shortly after, Snead quickly signed star wide receiver Odell Beckham Jr. Even in the postseason, Snead continued to be active, signing safety Eric Weddle out of retirement. These moves paid off with the Rams winning Super Bowl LVI, earning Snead his first championship as an executive.

Following the victory, a meme of Snead emerged with the caption "Fuck Them Picks" in response to Snead's acquisition of multiple players in exchange for trading several notable draft picks. Snead himself found the meme to his own humor, wearing a shirt bearing the image during the Rams' Super Bowl victory parade, and was even spotted with a mug displaying the image during the 2022 NFL draft

On September 8, 2022, Snead, as well as McVay, were extended through the 2026 season. Despite injuries and other setbacks leading to a disappointing 5–12 record in 2022 and bereft of top draft picks, Snead was still able to acquire running back Kyren Williams, cornerback Cobie Durant, and safety Quentin Lake, all of whom would later develop into full time starters in future seasons. While characterizing the team's activities not as a 'rebuild' but a 'remodel', Snead continued to focus on stockpiling talent and replenishing the Rams roster. In the 2023 NFL draft, Snead drafted guard Steve Avila in the second round, defensive end Byron Young and defensive tackle Kobie Turner in the third, offensive tackle Warren McClendon, tight end Davis Allen, and wide receiver Puka Nacua in the fifth, and punter Ethan Evans in the seventh. All developed into impact players, with Avila, Evans, Nacua, Turner, and Young taking on starting roles as rookies, as the Rams surprised most prognosticators by rebounding with a 10–7 record and a return to the NFC playoffs, where they lost to the Detroit Lions in a Wild Card Game. Young, Avila and Nacua started all 17 games in their first year, with Nacua being named NFC Offensive Rookie of the Year. With the retirement of perennial All-Pro Aaron Donald after the 2023 season, pressure was high on Snead and the Rams to fill the void. In 2024, the Rams had their first pick in the opening round in eight years and selected defensive end Jared Verse with the 19th overall pick. Verse became an immediate impact player along with fellow draftee Braden Fiske at defensive tackle, with Verse being named NFC Defensive Rookie of the Year following a season in which L.A. earned another NFC West title with a 10–7 record and reached the Divisional Round of the NFC playoffs. The Rams entered the 2025 season as a top contender for the Super Bowl and for much of the season looked the part. However, in a highly competitive division race, the Rams' 12–5 record was only good enough for second place, but L.A. scored playoff victories on the road against Carolina and Chicago before falling to the Seattle Seahawks in the NFC Championship Game 31–27. Following the end of the Rams' season, it was announced that Snead along with McVay had both agreed to multi-year contract extensions, though exact terms were not revealed. On March 11, 2026, The Rams traded the 29th overall pick in the 2026 NFL draft to the Chiefs (with the Chiefs selecting Peter Woods with that pick), a 5th- and 6th-round pick in the 2026 draft and a 2027 third-round pick for Trent McDuffie. During the 2026 NFL Draft, the Rams selected Quarterback Ty Simpson 13th overall in that years draft. On June 1, 2026, The Rams traded Jared Verse, a 2027 1st-round pick, a 2028 second-round pick, and a 2029 third-round pick for Myles Garrett.

== Personal life ==
Snead married sports media personality Kara Henderson in 2012. The couple currently reside in Malibu, California. Snead has two children, Cannon and Logan, from a previous marriage.
