= 2019 Los Angeles Rams season =

83rd season in franchise history

- Owner: Stan Kroenke
- General manager: Les Snead
- Head coach: Sean McVay
- Offensive coordinator: Sean McVay (de facto)
- Defensive coordinator: Wade Phillips
- Home stadium: Los Angeles Memorial Coliseum

Results
- Record: 9–7
- Division place: 3rd NFC West
- Playoffs: Did not qualify
- All-Pros: DT Aaron Donald (1st team)
- Pro Bowlers: DT Aaron Donald; CB Jalen Ramsey*

Uniform
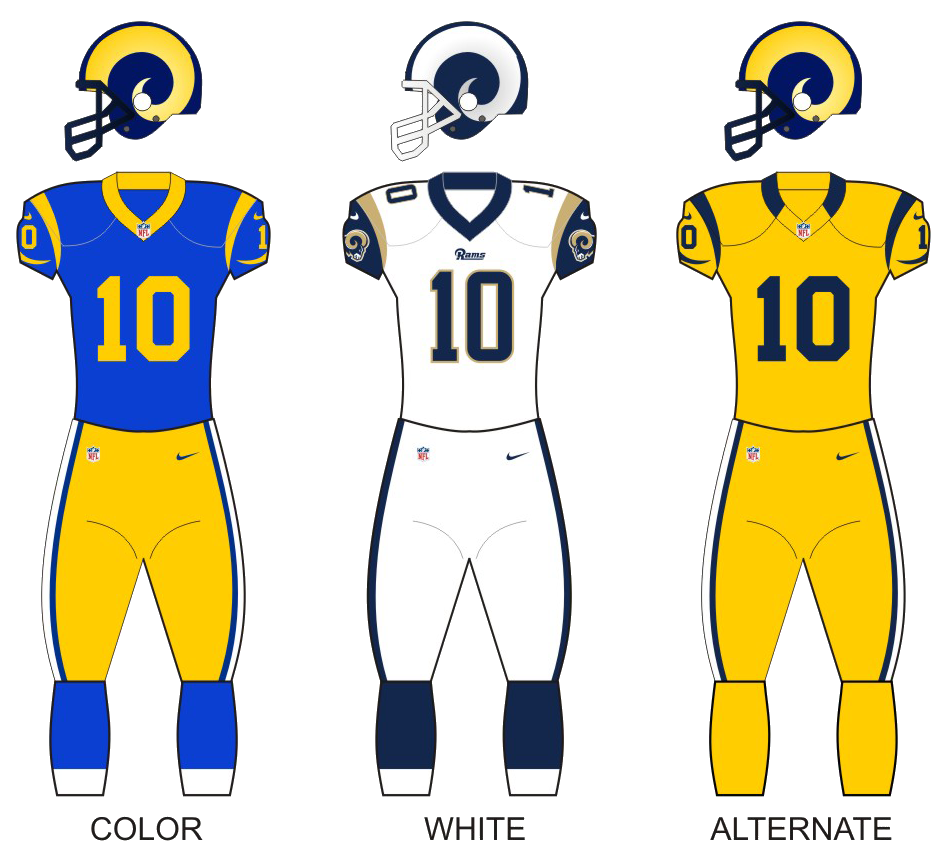

The 2019 season was the Los Angeles Rams' 82nd in the National Football League (NFL), their 83rd overall, their 53rd in the Greater Los Angeles Area and their third under head coach Sean McVay. It also marked the Rams' final season playing their home games at the Los Angeles Memorial Coliseum, as the team moved into SoFi Stadium in Inglewood beginning with the 2020 season alongside the Los Angeles Chargers. They entered the season as the defending NFC champions looking to bounce back after their Super Bowl LIII loss to the New England Patriots.

Although the Rams' temporary stadium was officially known as United Airlines Field at the Los Angeles Memorial Coliseum this season, the team removed any references to the corporate sponsor due to a team sponsorship from one of its competitors, American Airlines.

Despite starting the season at 3–0 the Rams lost 7 of their final 13 games and after a loss to their NFC West rival San Francisco 49ers in Week 16, were eliminated from playoff contention for the first time since 2016.

== Offseason ==
=== Coaching changes ===
- The Cincinnati Bengals hired Rams quarterbacks coach Zac Taylor as their new head coach February 4, 2019. Pass game coordinator Shane Waldron assumed quarterback coach responsibilities, and the Rams hired Zac Robinson as an assistant quarterbacks coach.
- The Rams hired Wes Phillips, son of Wade Phillips, as tight ends coach February 12, 2019. The younger Phillips had served in the same position with the Washington Redskins from 2014 through 2018. He had originally succeeded Sean McVay in that position after McVay was elevated to offensive coordinator.
- Eric Henderson was hired as defensive line coach, replacing Bill Johnson. Prior to joining the Rams, Henderson had served one season as assistant defensive line coach for the Los Angeles Chargers.

== Roster changes ==
=== Free agents ===
Position	Player	2019 Team	Date signed	Contract
RB	C. J. Anderson	Detroit Lions	April 1, 2019	1 year, $1.5 million
RB	Malcolm Brown	Los Angeles Rams	March 22, 2019	2 years, $3.3 million
SS	Blake Countess	Philadelphia Eagles	May 3, 2019	2 years, $2.35 million
DT	Dominique Easley			
OLB	Dante Fowler	Los Angeles Rams	March 10, 2019	1 year, $14 million
ILB	Bryce Hager	Los Angeles Rams	May 6, 2019	1 year, $805,000
CB	Troy Hill	Los Angeles Rams	May 30, 2019	2 years, $8.25 million
FS	Lamarcus Joyner	Oakland Raiders	March 13, 2019	4 years, $42 million
ILB	Cory Littleton	Los Angeles Rams	May 20, 2019	1 year, $3.095 million
OLB	Matt Longacre	Arizona Cardinals	July 24, 2019	1 year, $805,000
QB	Sean Mannion	Minnesota Vikings	April 7, 2019	1 year, $900,000
G	Rodger Saffold	Tennessee Titans	March 13, 2019	4 years, $44 million
CB	Sam Shields			
NT	Ndamukong Suh	Tampa Bay Buccaneers	May 21, 2019	1 year, $9.25 million
C	John Sullivan			
DT	Ethan Westbrooks	Oakland Raiders	July 30, 2019	1 year, $805,000
ILB	Ramik Wilson	Jacksonville Jaguars	May 1, 2019	1 year, $805,000

Player re-signed by the Rams

- Blake Countess was waived by the Rams on May 2, 2019, after declining to take a pay cut on his one-year, $2.025 million tender signed the previous month.

=== Free agent signings ===
Position	Player	Tag	Previous team	Date signed	Contract
FS	Eric Weddle	UFA	Baltimore Ravens	March 8, 2019	2 years, $8.5 million
QB	Blake Bortles	UFA	Jacksonville Jaguars	March 18, 2019	1 year, $1 million
OLB	Clay Matthews III	UFA	Green Bay Packers	March 19, 2019	2 years, $9.25 million
QB	John Wolford	UFA	Arizona Hotshots (AAF)	April 10, 2019	1 year, $495,000

=== NFL draft ===
2019 Los Angeles Rams draft
Round	Pick	Player	Position	College	Notes
2	61	Taylor Rapp	S	Washington	from Kansas City
3	70	Darrell Henderson	RB	Memphis	from Tampa Bay
3	79	David Long Jr.	CB	Michigan	from Atlanta
3	97	Bobby Evans	OT	Oklahoma	from New England
4	134	Greg Gaines	DT	Washington	from New England
5	169	David Edwards	OT	Wisconsin	
7	234	Nick Scott	S	Penn State	from New England
7	251	Dakota Allen	LB	Texas Tech	
Made roster * Made at least one Pro Bowl during career

Notes

- The Rams traded their second-round selection (No. 63 overall) as well as their fourth-round selection (124th) in 2018 to the Kansas City Chiefs in exchange for the Chiefs' sixth-round selection in 2018 (209th) and cornerback Marcus Peters.
- The Rams traded their third-round selection (No. 98 overall) as well as their 2020 fifth-round selection to the Jacksonville Jaguars in exchange for defensive end Dante Fowler.
- The Rams traded their seventh-round selection (245th overall) and linebacker Alec Ogletree to the New York Giants in exchange for the Giants' fourth- and sixth-round selections in 2018 (102nd and 176th).
- As the result of a negative differential of free agent signings and departures that the Rams experienced during the 2018 free agency period, the Rams were awarded three compensatory draft picks for the 2019 NFL draft, two in the third round (98th and 99th overall) and one in the seventh round (251st overall). The 98th pick was given to the Jacksonville Jaguars as part of the Dante Fowler trade.
- The Rams traded their first-round (31st overall) and sixth-round selections (203rd overall) to the Atlanta Falcons in exchange for the Falcons' second-round (45th overall) and third-round (79th overall) picks.
- The Rams traded their second-round pick (45th overall) acquired from Atlanta to the New England Patriots in exchange for the Patriots' second-round (56th overall), acquired from Chicago, and third-round (101st overall) selections.
- The Rams traded their second-round selection (56th overall), acquired from New England to Kansas City in exchange for the Chiefs' second-round (61st overall) and fifth-round (167th overall) pick.
- The Rams acquired a third-round pick (70th overall) from Tampa Bay, with the Buccaneers receiving two of the Rams' remaining third-round selections (94th and 99th overall).
- The Rams acquired a third-round pick (97th overall) from New England, with the Patriots receiving the Rams' remaining third-round (101st overall) and fourth-round (133rd overall) selections.
- The Rams traded two fifth-round picks (162nd and 167th overall) to New England in exchange for the Patriots' fourth-round (134th overall) and seventh-round (243rd overall) selections.

=== Undrafted free agents ===
Following the 2019 NFL draft, the Rams signed 19 undrafted rookie free agents who would compete for roster spots and participate in the team's offseason and training camp programs.

Position	Player	College
TE	Kendall Blanton	Missouri
WR	Alex Bachman	Wake Forest
G	Chandler Brewer	Middle Tennessee State
TE	Romello Brooker	Houston
TE	Keenan Brown	Texas State
RB	Matthew Colburn	Wake Forest
DT	Marquise Copeland	Cincinnati
LB	Landis Durham	Texas A&M
WR	Jalen Greene	Utah State
G	Brandon Hitner	Villanova
C	Vitas Hrynkiewicz	Youngstown State
OT	Matt Kaskey	Dartmouth
LB	Ketner Kupp	Eastern Washington
WR	Jonathan Lloyd	Duke
LB	Natrez Patrick	Georgia
OL	Justice Powers	UAB
LB	Troy Reeder	Delaware
DT	Owen Roberts	San Jose State
WR	Justin Sumpter	Kennesaw State
DT	Tyrell Thompson	Tarleton State
WR	Nsimba Webster	Eastern Washington

== Staff ==
2019 Los Angeles Rams staff
Front office: Chairman/Owner – Stan Kroenke; Executive vice president of football operations/COO – Kevin Demoff; General manager – Les Snead; Senior personnel executive – Brian Xanders; Senior personnel advisor – Taylor Morton; Director of college scouting – Brad Holmes; Director of scouting strategy – James Gladstone; Director of pro personnel – Ray Agnew; Assistant director of college scouting – Ted Monago; Director of draft management – J. W. Jordan; Head coaches: Head coach – Sean McVay; Assistant head coach/linebackers – Joe Barry; Assistant to the head coach – Bill Nayes; Offensive coaches: Assistant offensive coordinator – Jedd Fisch; Pass game coordinator/quarterbacks – Shane Waldron; Assistant quarterbacks – Zac Robinson; Running backs – Skip Peete; Wide receivers – Eric Yarber; Assistant wide receivers – Liam Coen; Tight ends – Wes Phillips; Run game coordinator – Aaron Kromer; Assistant offensive line – Andy Dickerson; Offensive quality control – Zak Kromer	Defensive coaches: Defensive coordinator – Wade Phillips; Defensive line – Eric Henderson; Outside linebackers – Chris Shula; Cornerbacks – Aubrey Pleasant; Safeties – Ejiro Evero; Defensive quality control/assistant defensive line – Thad Bogardus; Special teams coaches: Special teams coordinator – John Fassel; Assistant special teams – Matt Daniels; Strength and conditioning: Director of strength training and performance – Ted Rath; Assistant strength and conditioning – Fernando Noriega; Assistant strength and conditioning – Edward Grayer; Assistant strength and conditioning – Dustin Woods

== Final roster ==
2019 Los Angeles Rams roster
Quarterbacks (QB): 5 Blake Bortles; 16 Jared Goff; Running backs (RB): 34 Malcolm Brown; 30 Todd Gurley; 42 John Kelly; Wide receivers (WR): 12 Brandin Cooks; 18 Cooper Kupp; 83 Josh Reynolds; 88 Mike Thomas; 14 Nsimba Webster; 17 Robert Woods; Tight ends (TE): 86 Kendall Blanton; 81 Gerald Everett; 89 Tyler Higbee; 82 Johnny Mundt	Offensive linemen (OL): 66 Austin Blythe G/C; 67 Chandler Brewer T; 63 Austin Corbett G; 64 Jamil Demby G; 73 David Edwards G; 71 Bobby Evans T; 79 Rob Havenstein T; 65 Coleman Shelton C; 77 Andrew Whitworth T; Defensive linemen (DL): 90 Michael Brockers DE; 99 Aaron Donald DE; 97 Morgan Fox DE; 91 Greg Gaines NT; 69 Sebastian Joseph-Day NT; 92 Tanzel Smart NT	Linebackers (LB): 50 Samson Ebukam OLB; 56 Dante Fowler OLB; 48 Travin Howard ILB; 58 Cory Littleton ILB; 52 Clay Matthews OLB; 45 Ogbo Okoronkwo OLB; 57 Natrez Patrick OLB; 51 Troy Reeder ILB; 41 Kenny Young ILB; Defensive backs (DB): 26 Marqui Christian SS; 21 Donte Deayon CB; 39 Jake Gervase SS; 22 Troy Hill CB; 25 David Long CB; 20 Jalen Ramsey CB; 24 Taylor Rapp SS; 23 Nickell Robey-Coleman CB; 33 Nick Scott FS; 32 Eric Weddle FS; 31 Darious Williams CB; Special teams (ST): 6 Johnny Hekker P; 44 Jake McQuaide LS; 4 Greg Zuerlein K	Practice squad: 36 Adonis Alexander CB; 93 Marquise Copeland DE; 87 Greg Dortch WR; 96 Landis Durham OLB (PS/I); 46 Jeff Holland OLB; 61 Jeremiah Kolone G; 95 Jachai Polite OLB; 60 Nate Trewyn C; 84 Ethan Wolf TE; 9 John Wolford QB; Reserve: 55 Brian Allen C (IR); 42 Josh Carraway OLB (IR); 54 Bryce Hager ILB (IR); 27 Darrell Henderson RB (IR); 43 John Johnson SS (IR); 59 Micah Kiser ILB (IR); 53 Justin Lawler OLB (IR); 19 JoJo Natson WR (IR); 70 Joe Noteboom G (IR); Rookies in italics 53 active, 10 reserve, 9 practice squad

== Preseason ==
The Rams announced that they would host a preseason game at Aloha Stadium outside Honolulu, Hawaii. On March 21, the exhibition matchup between the Rams and the Dallas Cowboys was officially announced for Saturday, August 17. Continuing a trend he had established the previous season, head coach Sean McVay kept his established starters off the field for the entire preseason, with only his special teams unit of long snapper Jake McQuaide, punter Johnny Hekker, and kicker Greg Zuerlein in their regular season roles.

Week	Date	Opponent	Result	Record	Venue	Recap
1	August 10	at Oakland Raiders	L 3–14	0–1	RingCentral Coliseum	Recap
2	August 17	Dallas Cowboys	L 10–14	0–2	Aloha Stadium (Honolulu)	Recap
3	August 24	Denver Broncos	W 10–6	1–2	Los Angeles Memorial Coliseum	Recap
4	August 29	at Houston Texans	W 22–10	2–2	NRG Stadium	Recap

== Regular season ==
=== Schedule ===
Week	Date	Opponent	Result	Record	Venue	Recap
1	September 8	at Carolina Panthers	**W** 30–27	1–0	Bank of America Stadium	Recap
2	September 15	New Orleans Saints	**W** 27–9	2–0	Los Angeles Memorial Coliseum	Recap
3	September 22	at Cleveland Browns	**W** 20–13	3–0	FirstEnergy Stadium	Recap
4	September 29	Tampa Bay Buccaneers	**L** 40–55	3–1	Los Angeles Memorial Coliseum	Recap
5	October 3	at **Seattle Seahawks**	**L** 29–30	3–2	CenturyLink Field	Recap
6	October 13	**San Francisco 49ers**	**L** 7–20	3–3	Los Angeles Memorial Coliseum	Recap
7	October 20	at Atlanta Falcons	**W** 37–10	4–3	Mercedes-Benz Stadium	Recap
8	October 27	Cincinnati Bengals	**W** 24–10	5–3	(United Kingdom) Wembley Stadium (London)	Recap
9	Bye					
10	November 10	at Pittsburgh Steelers	**L** 12–17	5–4	Heinz Field	Recap
11	November 17	Chicago Bears	**W** 17–7	6–4	Los Angeles Memorial Coliseum	Recap
12	November 25	Baltimore Ravens	**L** 6–45	6–5	Los Angeles Memorial Coliseum	Recap
13	December 1	at **Arizona Cardinals**	**W** 34–7	7–5	State Farm Stadium	Recap
14	December 8	**Seattle Seahawks**	**W** 28–12	8–5	Los Angeles Memorial Coliseum	Recap
15	December 15	at Dallas Cowboys	**L** 21–44	8–6	AT&T Stadium	Recap
16	December 21	at **San Francisco 49ers**	**L** 31–34	8–7	Levi's Stadium	Recap
17	December 29	**Arizona Cardinals**	**W** 31–24	9–7	Los Angeles Memorial Coliseum	Recap

Notes

- Intra-division opponents are in **bold** text.
- For Rams home games, their home stadium reverted to its original name of Los Angeles Memorial Coliseum, and all signage indicating "United Airlines Field" was covered during games due to the franchise's sponsoring partnership with American Airlines.

=== Game summaries ===
==== Week 1: at Carolina Panthers ====
Week One: Los Angeles Rams at Carolina Panthers – Game summary

Quarter	1	2	3	4	Total
**Rams**	0	13	10	7	**30**
Panthers	0	3	10	14	**27**

at Bank of America Stadium, Charlotte, North Carolina

- Date: September 8
- Game time: 1:00 p.m. EDT/10:00 a.m. PDT
- Game weather: Sunny, 87 °F (31 °C)
- Game attendance: 72,005
- Referee: Shawn Hochuli
- TV announcers (Fox): Chris Myers, Daryl Johnston and Laura Okmin
- Recap, Game Book

Game information

**First quarter**

- No scoring plays.

**Second quarter**

- LAR – Greg Zuerlein 49-yard field goal, 13:43. Rams 3–0. **Drive: 7 plays, 26 yards, 1:58.**
- LAR – Malcolm Brown 5-yard run (Greg Zuerlein kick), 12:44. Rams 10–0. **Drive: 2 plays, 10 yards, 0:23.**
- LAR – Greg Zuerlein 56-yard field goal, 1:02. Rams 13–0. **Drive: 9 plays, 33 yards, 3:54.**
- CAR – Joey Slye 46-yard field goal, 0:00. Rams 13–3. **Drive: 8 plays, 47 yards, 1:02.**

**Third quarter**

- LAR – Greg Zuerlein 27–yard field goal, 11:53. Rams 16–3. **Drive: 7 plays, 66 yards, 3:07.**
- CAR – Christian McCaffrey 8-yard run (Joey Slye kick), 8:28. Rams 16–10. **Drive: 8 plays, 60 yards, 3:25.**
- LAR – Malcolm Brown 1-yard run (Greg Zuerlein kick), 2:51. Rams 23–10. **Drive: 13 plays, 75 yards, 5:37.**
- CAR – Joey Slye 52-yard field goal, 0:11. Rams 23–13. **Drive: 8 plays, 36 yards, 2:40.**

**Fourth quarter**

- CAR – Christian McCaffrey 2-yard run (Joey Slye kick), 13:10. Rams 23–20. **Drive: 2 plays, 5 yards, 0:28.**
- LAR – Tyler Higbee 5-yard pass from Jared Goff (Greg Zuerlein kick), 6:37. Rams 30–20. **Drive: 7 plays, 57 yards, 3:54.**
- CAR – Alexander Armah 1-yard run (Joey Slye kick), 1:58. Rams 30–27. **Drive: 9 plays, 69 yards, 2:08.**

**Top passers**

- LAR – Jared Goff – 23/39, 186 yards, TD, INT
- CAR – Cam Newton – 25/38, 239 yards, INT

**Top rushers**

- LAR – Todd Gurley – 14 rushes, 97 yards
- CAR – Christian McCaffrey – 19 rushes, 128 yards, 2 TD

**Top receivers**

- LAR – Robert Woods – 8 receptions, 70 yards
- CAR – Christian McCaffrey – 10 receptions, 81 yards

Shaking off a slow start, Todd Gurley had 97 rushing yards while Malcolm Brown added 53 yards and two touchdowns as the Rams won their season opener for the third time in as many years under head coach Sean McVay. Following a scoreless first quarter, Los Angeles took the lead on a 49-yard field goal by kicker Greg Zuerlein. Linebacker Samson Ebukam deflected a lateral attempt by Panthers quarterback Cam Newton and recovered the fumble, which helped set up a 5-yard touchdown run by Brown and a 10-0 Rams lead. Both L.A. and Carolina traded field goals before halftime. Zuerlein added his third field goal and Brown added a second touchdown in the third quarter as the Rams held a 23–13 advantage going into the fourth quarter. Gurley, who was held to only eight yards on five carries in the first half, had 89 yards on nine attempts in the second half and helped to set up the Rams' final score, a 5-yard touchdown pass from quarterback Jared Goff to tight end Tyler Higbee. Goff completed 23 of 39 passes for 186 yards, while wide receiver Robert Woods led the team in receptions (eight) and receiving yards (70). Making his return to the lineup after a season-ending injury in 2018, wide receiver Cooper Kupp had seven receptions for 46 yards. On defense, linebacker Cory Littleton had an interception, a forced fumble and fumble recovery to go along with his team-high eight tackles, while fellow linebacker Dante Fowler added a pair of sacks and Clay Matthews III had another in his first game with the Rams. Another new Ram, safety Eric Weddle, was taken out of the game in the second quarter following a collision with Panthers running back Christian McCaffrey that resulted in a head laceration.

==== Week 2: vs. New Orleans Saints ====
Week Two: New Orleans Saints at Los Angeles Rams – Game summary

Quarter	1	2	3	4	Total
Saints	0	3	3	3	**9**
**Rams**	3	3	14	7	**27**

at Los Angeles Memorial Coliseum, Los Angeles, California

- Date: September 15
- Game time: 1:25 pm. PDT
- Game weather: Cloudy, 85 °F (29 °C)
- Game attendance: 71,460
- Referee: Walt Anderson
- TV announcers (Fox): Joe Buck, Troy Aikman and Erin Andrews
- Recap, Game Book

Game information

**First quarter**

- LAR – Greg Zuerlein 24-yard field goal, 8:42. Rams 3–0. **Drive: 7 plays, 56 yards, 3:43.**

**Second quarter**

- NO – Wil Lutz 34-yard field goal, 11:06. Tied 3–3. **Drive: 7 plays, 25 yards, 3:15.**
- LAR – Greg Zuerlein 22-yard field goal, 0:03. Rams 6–3. **Drive: 7 plays, 44 yards, 2:36.**

**Third quarter**

- NO – Wil Lutz 52-yard field goal, 9:49. Tied 6–6. **Drive: 10 plays, 37 yards, 4:16.**
- LAR – Todd Gurley 4-yard run (Greg Zuerlein kick), 5:39. Rams 13–6. **Drive: 9 plays, 75 yards, 4:10.**
- LAR – Brandin Cooks 2-yard pass from Jared Goff (Greg Zuerlein kick), 1:00. Rams 20–6. **Drive: 5 plays, 26 yards, 2:37.**

**Fourth quarter**

- NO – Wil Lutz 42-yard field goal, 10:58. Rams 20–9. **Drive: 9 plays, 51 yards, 5:02.**
- LAR – Jared Goff 1-yard run (Greg Zuerlein kick), 8:37. Rams 27–9. **Drive: 4 plays, 75 yards, 2:21.**

**Top passers**

- NO – Teddy Bridgewater – 17/30, 165 yards
- LAR – Jared Goff – 19/28, 283 yards, TD

**Top rushers**

- NO – Alvin Kamara – 13 rushes, 45 yards
- LAR – Todd Gurley – 16 rushes, 63 yards, TD

**Top receivers**

- NO – Michael Thomas – 10 receptions, 89 yards
- LAR – Cooper Kupp – 5 receptions, 120 yards

Playing their home opener at the renovated Los Angeles Memorial Coliseum for the final time, the Rams hosted the Saints in a rematch of the 2018 NFC Championship Game and came away with a convincing victory. The game featured a strong defensive effort by both teams in the first half and early in the third quarter, as they traded two field goals each, with Rams kicker Greg Zuerlein connecting on attempts from 24 and 22 yards in the first half. A possible touchdown for the Saints after DE Cameron Jordan stripped Goff and returned the fumble for a score was controversially blown dead. With the score tied at 6–6 midway through the third quarter, the Rams mounted a 10-play, 75-yard drive that ended with a 4-yard touchdown run by Todd Gurley to give them a 13–6 advantage. After the Rams defense had back-to-back sacks to force a Saints punt, JoJo Natson returned the kick 32 yards to set the Rams up at the New Orleans 26. Three rushes for 16 yards by running back Malcolm Brown put the Rams on the 2-yard line and quarterback Jared Goff connected with wide receiver Brandin Cooks for the score. Following a Saints field goal early in the fourth quarter, the Rams faced third-and-2 from their own 33 when Goff hit wide receiver Cooper Kupp, who broke four tackles as he weaved through the Saints defense for a spectacular 66-yard catch-and-run before being brought down inches from the goal line. On the next play from scrimmage, Goff scored on a quarterback sneak to end the day's scoring. Kupp had five receptions for 120 yards, both team highs, in his first game back at the Coliseum since suffering a torn ACL there 10 months earlier. Goff completed 19 of 28 passes for 283 yards and two scores with no interceptions, and Gurley had 63 yards on 16 carries with one touchdown. Defensively, safety Eric Weddle and linebacker Cory Littleton shared the team lead in tackles with five each, while linebacker Clay Matthews and defensive end Michael Brockers each had a sack. Strong safety John Johnson added four tackles and an interception of Saints quarterback Drew Brees, who left the game in the first quarter with a hand injury and did not return. The Rams began their 38th and final season at the Coliseum, as they would move to SoFi Stadium in nearby Inglewood in 2020. The official name of the Rams' future stadium was announced earlier in the day on the Fox NFL Sunday pregame show.

==== Week 3: at Cleveland Browns ====
Week Three: Los Angeles Rams at Cleveland Browns – Game summary

Quarter	1	2	3	4	Total
**Rams**	3	0	7	10	**20**
Browns	0	6	7	0	**13**

at FirstEnergy Stadium, Cleveland, Ohio

- Date: September 22
- Game time: 8:20 pm. EDT/5:20 pm. PDT
- Game weather: Mostly clear, 83 °F (28 °C)
- Game attendance: 67,895
- Referee: Shawn Smith
- TV announcers (NBC): Al Michaels, Cris Collinsworth, Michele Tafoya and Terry McAulay
- Recap, Game Book

Game information

**First quarter**

- LAR – Greg Zuerlein 53-yard field goal, 4:06. Rams 3–0. **Drive: 11 plays, 51 yards, 4:58.**

**Second quarter**

- CLE – Austin Seibert 23-yard field goal, 11:41. Tied 3–3. **Drive: 13 plays, 70 yards, 7:25.**
- CLE – Austin Seibert 35-yard field goal, 0:00. Browns 6–3. **Drive: 4 plays, 0 yards, 0:18.**

**Third quarter**

- LAR – Cooper Kupp 11-yard pass from Jared Goff (Greg Zuerlein kick), 10:40. Rams 10–6. **Drive: 10 plays, 75 yards, 4:20.**
- CLE – Demetrius Harris 2-yard pass from Baker Mayfield (Austin Seibert kick), 4:37. Browns 13–10. **Drive: 11 plays, 75 yards, 6:03.**

**Fourth quarter**

- LAR – Cooper Kupp 6-yard pass from Jared Goff (Greg Zuerlein kick), 12:48. Rams 17–13. **Drive: 8 plays, 72 yards, 4:12.**
- LAR – Greg Zuerlein 37-yard field goal, 6:37. Rams 20–13. **Drive: 9 plays, 43 yards, 2:37.**

**Top passers**

- LAR – Jared Goff – 24/38, 269 yards, 2 TD, 2 INT
- CLE – Baker Mayfield – 18/36, 195 yards, TD, INT

**Top rushers**

- LAR – Todd Gurley – 14 rushes, 43 yards
- CLE – Nick Chubb – 23 rushes, 96 yards

**Top receivers**

- LAR – Brandin Cooks – 8 receptions, 112 yards
- CLE – Jarvis Landry – 3 receptions, 62 yards

Safety John Johnson's end zone interception of Browns quarterback Baker Mayfield with 27 seconds remaining capped a successful goal line stand as the Rams improved to 3–0 with their first win on Sunday Night Football in 14 years. Los Angeles took a first quarter lead on a 53-yard field goal by Greg Zuerlein, but fell behind for the first time in the season after giving up a pair of field goals to Browns kicker Austin Seibert. Jared Goff completed 24 of 38 passes for 269 yards with two touchdown passes to wide receiver Cooper Kupp, who finished with a team-high 11 receptions for 102 yards, while fellow wide receiver Brandin Cooks added eight receptions for 112 yards. Johnson led the Rams with nine tackles, with safety Eric Weddle and defensive end Michael Brockers adding six tackles each. Linebacker Clay Matthews III had three tackles with two sacks, a forced fumble, and a pass deflection playing in front of a FirstEnergy Stadium crowd that witnessed his father and namesake Clay Matthews Jr. be inducted into the Cleveland Browns Ring of Honor. The younger Matthews joined his family during the final moments of the halftime ceremony. The Rams won a Sunday Night game for the first time since a 20–10 victory over the Dallas Cowboys that was played on January 1, 2006, the final week of the 2005 NFL season.

==== Week 4: vs. Tampa Bay Buccaneers ====
Week Four: Tampa Bay Buccaneers at Los Angeles Rams – Game summary

Quarter	1	2	3	4	Total
**Buccaneers**	7	21	3	24	**55**
Rams	0	17	3	20	**40**

at Los Angeles Memorial Coliseum, Los Angeles, California

- Date: September 29
- Game time: 1:05 pm. PDT
- Game weather: Mostly sunny, 74 °F (23 °C)
- Game attendance: 68,117
- Referee: Brad Rogers
- TV announcers (Fox): Chris Myers, Daryl Johnston and Laura Okmin
- Recap, Game Book

Game information

**First quarter**

- TB – Peyton Barber 3-yard run (Matt Gay kick), 10:53. Buccaneers 7–0. **Drive: 8 plays, 60 yards, 4:07.**

**Second quarter**

- TB – Chris Godwin 3-yard pass from Jameis Winston (Matt Gay kick), 9:57. Buccaneers 14–0. **Drive: 7 plays, 50 yards, 3:27.**
- TB – Chris Godwin 9-yard pass from Jameis Winston (Matt Gay kick), 8:28. Buccaneers 21–0. **Drive: 1 play, 9 yards, 0:07.**
- LAR – Todd Gurley 13-yard run (Greg Zuerlein kick), 5:34. Buccaneers 21–7. **Drive: 8 plays, 75 yards, 2:54.**
- LAR – Gerald Everett 5-yard pass from Jared Goff (Greg Zuerlein kick), 2:50. Buccaneers 21–14. **Drive: 4 plays, 50 yards, 1:12.**
- TB – Ronald Jones 5-yard run (Matt Gay kick), 0:47. Buccaneers 28–14. **Drive: 11 plays, 75 yards, 2:03.**
- LAR – Greg Zuerlein 58-yard field goal, 0:02. Buccaneers 28–17. **Drive: 6 plays, 35 yards, 0:45.**

**Third quarter**

- LAR – Greg Zuerlein 44-yard field goal, 9:03. Buccaneers 28–20. **Drive: 14 plays, 49 yards, 5:57.**
- TB – Matt Gay 58-yard field goal, 4:33. Buccaneers 31–20. **Drive: 10 plays, 35 yards, 4:30.**

**Fourth quarter**

- TB – Cameron Brate 13-yard pass from Jameis Winston (Matt Gay kick), 14:55. Buccaneers 38–20. **Drive: 6 plays, 53 yards, 2:54.**
- LAR – Todd Gurley 5-yard run (Greg Zuerlein kick), 12:31. Buccaneers 38–27. **Drive: 8 plays, 75 yards, 2:24.**
- TB – Mike Evans 67-yard pass from Jameis Winston (Matt Gay kick), 11:35. Buccaneers 45–27. **Drive: 2 plays, 72 yards, 0:56.**
- LAR – Cooper Kupp 29-yard pass from Jared Goff (Greg Zuerlein kick), 9:12. Buccaneers 45–34. **Drive: 8 plays, 75 yards, 2:23.**
- LAR – Marcus Peters 32-yard interception return (pass failed), 8:11. Buccaneers 45–40.
- TB – Matt Gay 21-yard field goal, 2:35. Buccaneers 48–40. **Drive: 11 plays, 72 yards, 5:36.**
- TB – Ndamukong Suh 37-yard fumble return (Matt Gay kick), 1:06. Buccaneers 55–40.

**Top passers**

- TB – Jameis Winston – 28/41, 385 yards, 4 TD, INT
- LAR – Jared Goff – 45/68, 517 yards, 2 TD, 3 INT

**Top rushers**

- TB – Ronald Jones – 19 rushes, 70 yards, TD
- LAR – Todd Gurley – 5 rushes, 16 yards, 2 TD

**Top receivers**

- TB – Chris Godwin – 12 receptions, 172 yards, 2 TD
- LAR – Robert Woods – 13 receptions, 164 yards

Jared Goff set personal bests for passing attempts, completions, and yards, but also had four turnovers (all of which led directly to Tampa Bay touchdowns) as the Rams lost for the first time in the season. Host Los Angeles fell behind 21–0 early in the second quarter and spent the rest of the day trying to catch up, as Goff tied a league record with 45 pass completions (Drew Bledsoe, New England vs. Minnesota, 1994), and his 68 pass attempts tied for third-most in league history (George Blanda, Houston vs. Buffalo, 1964; Jon Kitna, Cincinnati vs. Pittsburgh, 2001). In addition to his new team records for single game attempts and completions, which broke marks previously held by Marc Bulger (vs. New York Giants, 2005), Goff's 517 passing yards tied with Tom Brady (New England vs. Miami, 2011) for the eighth-highest single-game total in NFL records, and was exceeded only by Norm Van Brocklin's league-record 554 yards against the New York Yanks in 1951 for the highest total in team history. However, Goff threw three interceptions and then fumbled once with just over a minute remaining when he was sacked and stripped of the ball by Buccaneers linebacker Shaquil Barrett, with defensive tackle Ndamukong Suh picking it up and running it 37 yards for the touchdown to seal the victory against his former team. Wide receiver Robert Woods had a career-high 13 receptions for 164 yards, while Cooper Kupp added nine catches for 121 yards and a touchdown and running back Todd Gurley had seven receptions for 54 yards. Though Gurley scored two rushing touchdowns, he ran the ball a career-low five times for only 16 yards as the large early deficit led the Rams to abandon the running game (11 attempts, 28 yards). Safety Eric Weddle had 15 tackles to lead the Rams, and cornerback Marcus Peters picked off a Jameis Winston pass and returned it 32 yards for a touchdown in the fourth quarter.

==== Week 5: at Seattle Seahawks ====
Week Five: Los Angeles Rams at Seattle Seahawks – Game summary

Quarter	1	2	3	4	Total
Rams	6	7	13	3	**29**
**Seahawks**	7	7	7	9	**30**

at CenturyLink Field, Seattle, Washington

- Date: October 3
- Game time: 5:20 pm. PDT
- Game weather: Cloudy, 57 °F (14 °C)
- Game attendance: 68,988
- Referee: Scott Novak
- TV announcers (Fox/Amazon Prime Video): Joe Buck, Troy Aikman, Erin Andrews and Kristina Pink
- Recap, Game Book

Game information

**First quarter**

- LAR – Greg Zuerlein 47-yard field goal, 12:24. Rams 3–0. **Drive: 4 plays, 4 yards, 1:23.**
- LAR – Greg Zuerlein 32-yard field goal, 4:55. Rams 6–0. **Drive: 10 plays, 55 yards, 4:32.**
- SEA – Tyler Lockett 13-yard pass from Russell Wilson (Jason Myers kick), 0:49. Seahawks 7–6. **Drive: 7 plays, 75 yards, 4:06.**

**Second quarter**

- SEA – DK Metcalf 40-yard pass from Russell Wilson (Jason Myers kick), 8:08. Seahawks 14–6. **Drive: 5 plays, 73 yards, 2:46.**
- LAR – Cooper Kupp 9-yard pass from Jared Goff (Greg Zuerlein kick), 0:06. Seahawks 14–13. **Drive: 8 plays, 62 yards, 1:28.**

**Third quarter**

- LAR – Todd Gurley 8-yard run (Greg Zuerlein kick), 12:07. Rams 20–14. **Drive: 6 plays, 75 yards, 2:53.**
- SEA – David Moore 10-yard pass from Russell Wilson (Jason Myers kick), 5:45. Seahawks 21–20. **Drive: 6 plays, 47 yards, 2:59.**
- LAR – Todd Gurley 1-yard run (run failed), 3:07. Rams 26–21. **Drive: 5 plays, 75 yards, 2:38.**

**Fourth quarter**

- SEA – Jason Myers 42-yard field goal, 13:37. Rams 26–24. **Drive: 9 plays, 51 yards, 4:30.**
- LAR – Greg Zuerlein 36-yard field goal, 9:19. Rams 29–24. **Drive: 10 plays, 57 yards, 4:18.**
- SEA – Chris Carson 5-yard pass from Russell Wilson (pass failed), 2:28. Seahawks 30–29. **Drive: 12 plays, 75 yards, 6:51.**

**Top passers**

- LAR – Jared Goff – 29/49, 395 yards, TD, INT
- SEA – Russell Wilson – 17/23, 268 yards, 4 TD

**Top rushers**

- LAR – Todd Gurley – 15 rushes, 51 yards, 2 TD
- SEA – Chris Carson – 27 rushes, 118 yards

**Top receivers**

- LAR – Gerald Everett – 7 receptions, 136 yards
- SEA – Will Dissly – 4 receptions, 81 yards

Greg Zuerlein's 44-yard field goal attempt went wide right with 11 seconds remaining, and the Rams' comeback bid fell short at CenturyLink Field. Zuerlein ended L.A.'s first two drives with field goals of 47 and 32 yards for a 6–0 first-quarter lead. After Seahawks quarterback Russell Wilson threw two touchdowns to put his team up 14–6, Jared Goff guided the Rams on an eight-play, 62-yard drive that was capped with a 9-yard touchdown pass from Goff to wide receiver Cooper Kupp, who finished with a team-high nine receptions for 117 yards. In the second half, running back Todd Gurley (15 carries, 51 yards) scored two rushing touchdowns and Zuerlein added his third field goal (36 yards) to give the Rams a 29–24 advantage with less than 10 minutes to play in the fourth quarter, but Wilson led his team to the go-ahead touchdown with just over two minutes remaining. Tight end Gerald Everett had a career single-game best seven receptions for 136 yards, and caught three passes for 46 yards on the Rams' final drive to set up Zuerlein's fourth and final attempt of the day, which just missed the upright and denied L.A.'s bid for a third straight win at Seattle (and fourth in five years). Goff completed 29 of 49 passes for 395 yards with one touchdown and one interception. Making his first professional NFL start, rookie free agent linebacker Troy Reeder led the Rams with 13 tackles (eight solo) and linebacker Clay Matthews III had five tackles, including a sack, but was flagged for a questionable roughing the passer penalty that kept the Seahawks' final scoring drive alive. With the loss, the Rams fell to 3–2 on the season, while the Seahawks improved to 4–1.

==== Week 6: vs. San Francisco 49ers ====
Week Six: San Francisco 49ers at Los Angeles Rams – Game summary

Quarter	1	2	3	4	Total
**49ers**	7	0	10	3	**20**
Rams	7	0	0	0	**7**

at Los Angeles Memorial Coliseum, Los Angeles, California

- Date: October 13
- Game time: 1:05 pm. PDT
- Game weather: Sunny, 77 °F (25 °C)
- Game attendance: 75,695
- Referee: Bill Vinovich
- TV announcers (Fox): Dick Stockton, Mark Schlereth and Jennifer Hale
- Recap, Game Book

Game information

**First quarter**

- LAR – Robert Woods 8-yard run (Greg Zuerlein kick), 9:17. Rams 7–0. **Drive: 7 plays, 56 yards, 3:36.**
- SF – Tevin Coleman 2-yard run (Robbie Gould kick), 3:39. Tied 7–7. **Drive: 10 plays, 75 yards, 5:38.**

**Second quarter**

- No scoring plays.

**Third quarter**

- SF – Jimmy Garoppolo 1-yard run (Robbie Gould kick), 12:50. 49ers 14–7. **Drive: 4 plays, 17 yards, 2:01.**
- SF – Robbie Gould 25-yard field goal, 4:58. 49ers 17–7. **Drive: 12 plays, 50 yards, 6:18.**

**Fourth quarter**

- SF – Robbie Gould 34-yard field goal, 12:03. 49ers 20–7. **Drive: 11 plays, 43 yards, 6:38.**

**Top passers**

- SF – Jimmy Garoppolo – 24/33, 243 yards, INT
- LAR – Jared Goff – 13/24, 78 yards

**Top rushers**

- SF – Tevin Coleman – 18 rushes, 45 yards, TD
- LAR – Malcolm Brown – 11 rushes, 40 yards

**Top receivers**

- SF – George Kittle – 8 receptions, 103 yards
- LAR – Tyler Higbee – 3 receptions, 25 yards

A critical turnover broke open a tie game in the second half as the 49ers shut down the Rams' offense in a key NFC West battle at the Coliseum. Los Angeles fell to 3–3, losing three games in a row for the first time in the Sean McVay era. Quarterback Jared Goff, who two weeks earlier had passed for a career-high 517 yards in a loss to Tampa Bay, was held to a career-low 78 passing yards and was sacked four times. Playing without Todd Gurley, the Rams running game started fast on its opening drive, going 56 yards on seven plays (all runs) with wide receiver Robert Woods scoring a touchdown from eight yards out to give Los Angeles an early 7–0 lead; however, Gurley's replacement, Malcolm Brown, who rushed five times for 40 yards on the opening drive, was held to four carries and one yard for the remainder of the game, and failed twice to score from the 1-yard line in a second-quarter goal-line stand. Rookie running back Darrell Henderson saw his first significant playing time of the season, carrying three times for 40 yards to set up that second-quarter scoring opportunity, but he failed to handle Goff's pitchout on the first play of the second half, and four plays later, the 49ers went ahead for good. The San Francisco defense held the Rams to only seven rushing yards on seven attempts after halftime, and gave up only one pass play of more than nine yards in the entire game. In addition, the Rams offense went 0-for-15 on third and fourth down. The Rams defense was led by linebacker Cory Littleton, who had 14 tackles and a fumble recovery, and defensive tackle Aaron Donald, who had two sacks of 49ers quarterback Jimmy Garoppolo, including a forced fumble. The Rams held San Francisco's then-No. 1-ranked rushing offense to just 99 yards on 41 rushing plays. Cornerback Marcus Peters had four tackles and an interception in his final game with the Rams before being traded to the Baltimore Ravens two days later.

==== Week 7: at Atlanta Falcons ====
Week Seven: Los Angeles Rams at Atlanta Falcons – Game summary

Quarter	1	2	3	4	Total
**Rams**	3	10	14	10	**37**
Falcons	3	0	0	7	**10**

at Mercedes-Benz Stadium, Atlanta, Georgia

- Date: October 20
- Game time: 1:00 pm. EDT/10:00 am. PDT
- Game weather: None (retractable roof closed)
- Game attendance: 71,856
- Referee: Ronald Torbert
- TV announcers (Fox): Sam Rosen, Charles Davis and Pam Oliver
- Recap, Game Book

Game information

**First quarter**

- ATL – Matt Bryant 52-yard field goal, 11:23. Falcons 3–0. **Drive: 9 plays, 33 yards, 3:37.**
- LAR – Greg Zuerlein 55-yard field goal, 1:42. Tied 3–3. **Drive: 5 plays, 20 yards, 1:24.**

**Second quarter**

- LAR – Todd Gurley 13-yard pass from Jared Goff (Greg Zuerlein kick), 11:16. Rams 10–3. **Drive: 9 plays, 84 yards, 3:44.**
- LAR – Greg Zuerlein 25-yard field goal, 1:56. Rams 13–3. **Drive: 11 plays, 70 yards, 4:51.**

**Third quarter**

- LAR – Gerald Everett 8-yard pass from Jared Goff (Greg Zuerlein kick), 10:35. Rams 20–3. **Drive: 9 plays, 75 yards, 4:25.**
- LAR – Jared Goff 1-yard run (Greg Zuerlein kick), 6:34. Rams 27–3. **Drive: 5 plays, 16 yards, 3:09.**

**Fourth quarter**

- LAR – Greg Zuerlein 20-yard field goal, 5:42. Rams 30–3. **Drive: 15 plays, 52 yards, 8:04.**
- ATL – Austin Hooper 10-yard pass from Matt Schaub (Matt Bryant kick), 2:36. Rams 30–10. **Drive: 8 plays, 75 yards, 3:06.**
- LAR – Darious Williams fumble recovery in end zone (Greg Zuerlein kick), 0:11. Rams 37–10.

**Top passers**

- LAR – Jared Goff – 22/37, 268 yards, 2 TD
- ATL – Matt Ryan – 16/27, 159 yards, INT

**Top rushers**

- LAR – Todd Gurley – 18 rushes, 41 yards
- ATL – Devonta Freeman – 7 rushes, 19 yards

**Top receivers**

- LAR – Robert Woods – 5 receptions, 80 yards
- ATL – Julio Jones – 6 receptions, 93 yards

The Rams produced five sacks and forced three turnovers and snapped a five-game losing streak to Atlanta dating back to 2007 to improve to 4–3 on the season. Edge rusher Dante Fowler had a career-high three sacks among his team-leading seven total tackles (six solo) along with a pass deflection and a forced fumble. In his first game with the Rams following a midseason trade with the Jacksonville Jaguars, cornerback Jalen Ramsey had four tackles and a forced fumble. On offense, quarterback Jared Goff (268 yards) passed for two touchdowns and ran for another, while Robert Woods led the Rams with five receptions for 80 yards. Running back Todd Gurley contributed 41 yards rushing and had his first TD reception of the season, and the Rams allowed no sacks and were turnover-free for the first time in 2019. Kicker Greg Zuerlein had three field goals, while punter Johnny Hekker connected on a 23-yard pass to Nick Scott on a fake punt to help set up a Rams score.

==== Week 8: vs. Cincinnati Bengals ====
NFL London Games

Week Eight: Cincinnati Bengals at Los Angeles Rams – Game summary

Quarter	1	2	3	4	Total
Bengals	0	10	0	0	**10**
**Rams**	3	14	7	0	**24**

at Wembley Stadium, London, England

- Date: October 27
- Game time: 5:00 p.m. GMT/10:00 am. PDT
- Game weather: Fair, 48 °F (9 °C)
- Game attendance: 83,720
- Referee: Jerome Boger
- TV announcers (CBS): Greg Gumbel, Trent Green and Melanie Collins
- Recap, Game Book

Game information

**First quarter**

- LAR – Greg Zuerlein 23-yard field goal, 6:41. Rams 3–0. **Drive: 12 plays, 85 yards, 6:05.**

**Second quarter**

- CIN – Randy Bullock 28-yard field goal, 14:57. Tied 3–3. **Drive: 11 plays, 65 yards, 6:44.**
- LAR – Josh Reynolds 31-yard pass from Jared Goff (Greg Zuerlein kick), 10:43. Rams 10–3. **Drive: 7 plays, 92 yards, 4:14.**
- CIN – Joe Mixon 1-yard pass from Andy Dalton (Randy Bullock kick), 5:18. Tied 10–10. **Drive: 11 plays, 75 yards, 5:25.**
- LAR – Cooper Kupp 65-yard pass from Jared Goff (Greg Zuerlein kick), 3:57. Rams 17–10. **Drive: 3 plays, 75 yards, 1:21.**

**Third quarter**

- LAR – Todd Gurley 3-yard run (Greg Zuerlein kick), 10:14. Rams 24–10. **Drive: 10 plays, 75 yards, 4:46.**

**Fourth quarter**

- No scoring plays.

**Top passers**

- CIN – Andy Dalton – 32/52, 329 yards, TD
- LAR – Jared Goff – 17/31, 372 yards, 2 TD

**Top rushers**

- CIN – Joe Mixon – 17 rushes, 66 yards
- LAR – Darrell Henderson – 11 rushes, 49 yards

**Top receivers**

- CIN – Alex Erickson – 6 receptions, 97 yards
- LAR – Cooper Kupp – 7 receptions, 220 yards, TD

Wide receiver Cooper Kupp caught seven passes for a career-high 220 yards and a touchdown to lead the Rams to their first win over the Bengals since 2003. Kupp, who had five catches for 165 yards in the first half alone, scored on a wild double-reverse flea-flicker play midway through the second quarter in which he took a handoff from quarterback Jared Goff going right, then handed the ball to fellow wide receiver Robert Woods going left, who then tossed it back to a waiting Goff, who found Kupp breaking free down the right sideline for the touchdown that put the Rams ahead for good. Goff completed 17 of 31 passes for 372 yards and two touchdowns (while also not committing a turnover or being sacked for the second straight game), while wide receiver Josh Reynolds had three receptions for 73 yards, including a 31-yard touchdown, playing in relief of starter Brandin Cooks, who suffered a concussion on the Rams' opening drive and did not return to the game. Rookie safety Taylor Rapp led the defense with 12 tackles, while the Rams combined for five sacks on the day. Head coach Sean McVay remained undefeated (10–0) against AFC opponents during the regular season, getting the win over Bengals head coach Zac Taylor, who spent the two previous seasons on McVay's staff as a Rams assistant coach. The game also marked a significant milestone for Rams offensive tackle Andrew Whitworth, a 14-year NFL veteran who spent his first 11 seasons playing for the Bengals. With the victory, Whitworth became only the 12th starter in league history to earn victories over all 32 NFL teams.

==== Week 10: at Pittsburgh Steelers ====
Week Ten: Los Angeles Rams at Pittsburgh Steelers – Game summary

Quarter	1	2	3	4	Total
Rams	7	0	3	2	**12**
**Steelers**	7	7	0	3	**17**

at Heinz Field, Pittsburgh, Pennsylvania

- Date: November 10
- Game time: 4:25 pm. EST/1:25 pm. PST
- Game weather: Clear, 55 °F (13 °C)
- Game attendance: 63,627
- Referee: Shawn Smith
- TV announcers (Fox): Chris Myers, Daryl Johnston and Laura Okmin
- Recap, Game Book

Game information

**First quarter**

- LAR – Dante Fowler 26-yard fumble return (Greg Zuerlein kick), 14:46. Rams 7–0.
- PIT – James Washington 3-yard pass from Mason Rudolph (Chris Boswell kick), 0:34. Tied 7–7. **Drive: 9 plays, 82 yards, 4:14.**

**Second quarter**

- PIT – Minkah Fitzpatrick 43-yard fumble return (Chris Boswell kick), 1:44. Steelers 14–7.

**Third quarter**

- LAR – Greg Zuerlein 30-yard field goal, 0:11. Steelers 14–10. **Drive: 11 plays, 76 yards, 5:32.**

**Fourth quarter**

- LAR – Mason Rudolph sacked in end zone by Aaron Donald and Clay Matthews III, 12:40. Steelers 14–12.
- PIT – Chris Boswell 33-yard field goal, 2:46. Steelers 17–12. **Drive: 14 plays, 60 yards, 8:00.**

**Top passers**

- LAR – Jared Goff – 22/41, 243 yards, 2 INT
- PIT – Mason Rudolph – 22/38, 242 yards, TD

**Top rushers**

- LAR – Todd Gurley – 12 rushes, 73 yards
- PIT – Jaylen Samuels – 14 rushes, 29 yards

**Top receivers**

- LAR – Gerald Everett – 8 receptions, 68 yards
- PIT – James Washington – 6 receptions, 90 yards, TD

In a sloppy game marred by 10 penalties and costly turnovers, the Rams fell to the host Steelers in a defensive battle at Heinz Field. Linebacker Dante Fowler gave Los Angeles a 7–0 lead just 14 seconds into the game when a shotgun snap went over Steelers quarterback Mason Rudolph's head. Fowler easily scooped up the ball and ran 26 yards for his first career NFL touchdown. While Pittsburgh was able to tie the score with a touchdown at the end of the first quarter, the Rams continued to struggle on offense in the first half, ending their first five offensive drives in Johnny Hekker punts. The sixth drive ended disastrously just after the two-minute warning, when quarterback Jared Goff was hit as he attempted to get rid of the ball, which was then picked up by Steelers cornerback Minkah Fitzpatrick who returned it 43 yards to put the Steelers ahead 14–7. The Rams turned over the ball twice in the third quarter before mounting an 11-play, 76-yard drive that ended with a 30-yard field goal by kicker Greg Zuerlein just before the end of the period. Early in the fourth quarter, the Rams pulled to within 14-12 when defensive tackle Aaron Donald (making his first appearance as a pro in Pittsburgh, where he played his high school and college football) sacked Rudolph in the end zone for a safety. But the Steelers were able to convert a field goal to increase their lead to 17-12 and the Rams' final drive ended with Goff throwing his second interception of the day with under 30 seconds remaining. Tight end Gerald Everett caught a team-high eight receptions for 68 yards and wide receiver Robert Woods had seven receptions for 95 yards. Running back Todd Gurley ran for 72 yards on just 12 carries, but didn't carry the ball at all during the fourth quarter. Linebacker Cory Littleton had 13 combined tackles, while Donald had six total tackles, including three for losses, including a safety.

==== Week 11: vs. Chicago Bears ====
Week Eleven: Chicago Bears at Los Angeles Rams – Game summary

Quarter	1	2	3	4	Total
Bears	0	0	7	0	**7**
**Rams**	0	10	0	7	**17**

at Los Angeles Memorial Coliseum, Los Angeles, California

- Date: November 17
- Game time: 5:20 pm. PST
- Game weather: Clear, 79 °F (26 °C)
- Game attendance: 70,758
- Referee: John Hussey
- TV announcers (NBC): Al Michaels, Cris Collinsworth, Michele Tafoya and Terry McAulay
- Recap, Game Book

Game information

**First quarter**

- No scoring plays

**Second quarter**

- LAR – Greg Zuerlein 38-yard field goal, 11:31. Rams 3-0. **Drive: 8 plays, 43 yards, 4:26.**
- LAR – Todd Gurley 1-yard run (Greg Zuerlein kick), 3:28. Rams 10-0. **Drive: 4 plays, 56 yards, 1:55.**

**Third quarter**

- CHI – Tarik Cohen 14-yard pass from Mitch Trubisky (Eddy Pineiro kick), 7:10. Rams 10-7. **Drive: 12 plays, 80 yards, 5:51.**

**Fourth quarter**

- LAR – Malcolm Brown 5-yard run (Greg Zuerlein kick), 3:31. Rams 17-7. **Drive: 8 plays, 71 yards, 4:11.**

**Top passers**

- CHI – Mitch Trubisky – 24/43, 190 yards, TD, INT
- LAR – Jared Goff – 11/18, 173 yards, INT

**Top rushers**

- CHI – Tarik Cohen – 9 rushes, 39 yards
- LAR – Todd Gurley – 25 rushes, 97 yards, TD

**Top receivers**

- CHI – Taylor Gabriel – 7 receptions, 57 yards
- LAR – Josh Reynolds – 3 receptions, 55 yards

Todd Gurley matched his season-high with 97 rushing yards on 25 carries, including a 1-yard touchdown run late in the first half as the Rams bounced back with a victory over the Bears before a Sunday Night Football audience. Despite turning over the ball on offense on its first two drives, host Los Angeles held firm on defense, forcing Chicago to give up the ball on downs on one drive and ending with missed field goals on two others. Greg Zuerlein converted a 38-yard field goal for the game's first points, and cornerback Troy Hill intercepted a pass from Bears quarterback Mitchell Trubisky to help set up a 50-yard pass from Jared Goff to wide receiver Cooper Kupp that ended just short of the goal line. Gurley himself ran it in one play later to give the Rams a 10–0 lead at halftime. The Bears were able to pull within three points after a Trubisky touchdown pass, but the Rams were able to extend their lead back to 10 points as running back Malcolm Brown scored on a 5-yard run midway through the fourth period for L.A.'s final points. Gurley added 36 yards on three receptions, which tied both Kupp and Josh Reynolds for the team lead on a quiet production day in which the Rams mustered only 283 total yards on offense. Rookie safety Taylor Rapp led the Rams with eight total tackles, while defensive tackle Aaron Donald had two sacks and was named NFC Defensive Player of the Week as Los Angeles improved to 6–4 on the season.

==== Week 12: vs. Baltimore Ravens ====
Week Twelve: Baltimore Ravens at Los Angeles Rams – Game summary

Quarter	1	2	3	4	Total
**Ravens**	14	14	7	10	**45**
Rams	0	6	0	0	**6**

at Los Angeles Memorial Coliseum, Los Angeles, California

- Date: November 25
- Game time: 5:15 pm. PST
- Game weather: Clear, 62 °F (17 °C)
- Game attendance: 72,409
- Referee: Craig Wrolstad
- TV announcers (ESPN): Joe Tessitore, Booger McFarland and Lisa Salters
- Recap, Game Book

Game information

**First quarter**

- BAL – Marquise Brown 6-yard pass from Lamar Jackson (Justin Tucker kick), 7:47. Ravens 7–0. **Drive: 9 plays, 55 yards, 5:48.**
- BAL – Marquise Brown 18-yard pass from Lamar Jackson (Justin Tucker kick), 1:31. Ravens 14–0. **Drive: 7 plays, 61 yards, 3:49.**

**Second quarter**

- LAR – Greg Zuerlein 42-yard field goal, 9:45. Ravens 14–3. **Drive: 15 plays, 61 yards, 6:46.**
- BAL – Mark Ingram II 1-yard run (Justin Tucker kick), 4:42. Ravens 21–3. **Drive: 8 plays, 75 yards, 5:03.**
- LAR – Greg Zuerlin 46-yard field goal, 1:55. Ravens 21–6. **Drive: 6 plays, 48 yards, 2:47.**
- BAL – Willie Snead 7-yard pass from Lamar Jackson (Justin Tucker kick), 0:12. Ravens 28–6. **Drive: 7 plays, 61 yards, 3:49.**

**Third quarter**

- BAL – Mark Ingram II 7-yard pass from Lamar Jackson (Justin Tucker kick), 9:46. Ravens 35–6. **Drive: 10 plays, 75 yards, 5:14.**

**Fourth quarter**

- BAL – Willie Snead 7-yard pass from Lamar Jackson (Justin Tucker kick), 14:43. Ravens 42–6. **17 plays, 78 yards, 9:04.**
- BAL – Justin Tucker 34-yard field goal, 6:35. Ravens 45–6. **Drive: 11 plays, 48 yards, 6:01.**

**Top passers**

- BAL – Lamar Jackson – 15/20, 169 yards, 5 TD
- LAR – Jared Goff – 26/37, 212 yards, 2 INT

**Top rushers**

- BAL – Mark Ingram II – 15 rushes, 111 yards, 1 TD
- LAR – Todd Gurley – 6 rushes, 22 yards

**Top receivers**

- BAL – Miles Boykin – 2 receptions, 54 yards
- LAR – Robert Woods – 6 receptions, 97 yards

In front of a nationwide audience on Monday Night Football, the Rams suffered the worst home loss in franchise history as the visiting Ravens dominated all phases of the game. Baltimore became the fourth team in the 21st century to score touchdowns on its first six drives in a game, as quarterback Lamar Jackson completed 15 of 20 passes for 169 yards and five touchdowns, while also running for 95 yards on only eight carries. Todd Gurley carried the ball only six times for 22 yards, while Jared Goff passed for 212 yards with two interceptions. Kicker Greg Zuerlein's two-second quarter field goals represented all of the scoring for the Rams in their biggest defeat in Los Angeles since a 52–14 loss to Chicago in 1963, and their worst loss under head coach Sean McVay. It was also the Rams' first loss wearing their yellow color rush uniforms after four previous victories, and marked the final time the team would utilize the uniform set, which debuted in 2015.

==== Week 13: at Arizona Cardinals ====
Week Thirteen: Los Angeles Rams at Arizona Cardinals – Game summary

Quarter	1	2	3	4	Total
**Rams**	3	17	14	0	**34**
Cardinals	0	0	0	7	**7**

at State Farm Stadium, Glendale, Arizona

- Date: December 1
- Game time: 1:05 pm. PST/2:05 p.m. MST
- Game weather: TBD (retractable roof stadium)
- Game attendance: 60,944
- Referee: Alex Kemp
- TV announcers (Fox): Chris Myers, Daryl Johnston and Laura Okmin
- Recap, Game Book

Game information

**First quarter**

- LAR – Greg Zuerlein 27-yard field goal, 9:56. Rams 3-0. **Drive: 10 plays, 66 yards, 5:04.**

**Second quarter**

- LAR – Tyler Higbee 2-yard pass from Jared Goff (Greg Zuerlein kick), 14:17. Rams 10-0. **Drive: 10 plays, 81 yards, 4:02.**
- LAR – Todd Gurley 1-yard run (Greg Zuerlein kick), 2:41. Rams 17-0. **Drive: 7 plays, 82 yards, 3:14.**
- LAR – Greg Zuerlein 33-yard field goal, 0:00. Rams 20-0. **Drive: 11 plays, 63 yards, 1:53.**

**Third quarter**

- LAR – Cooper Kupp 10-yard pass from Jared Goff (Greg Zuerlein kick), 8:44. Rams 27-0. **Drive: 9 plays, 92 yards, 3:17.**
- LAR – Taylor Rapp 31-yard interception return (Greg Zuerlein kick), 8:28. Rams 34-0.

**Fourth quarter**

- ARI – Kyler Murray 15-yard run (Zane Gonzalez kick), 8:35. Rams 34-7. **Drive: 13 plays, 80 yards, 5:15.**

**Top passers**

- ARI – Kyler Murray – 19/34, 163 yards, INT
- LAR – Jared Goff – 32/43, 424 yards, 2 TD

**Top rushers**

- ARI – Kenyan Drake – 13 rushes, 31 yards
- LAR – Todd Gurley – 19 rushes, 95 yards, TD

**Top receivers**

- ARI – Larry Fitzgerald – 6 receptions, 56 yards
- LAR – Robert Woods – 13 receptions, 172 yards

The Rams bounced back from the Ravens' loss with their fifth straight win at Arizona. Quarterback Jared Goff, who did not throw a single touchdown during the month of November, turned in his best performance of the year completing 32 of 43 passes for 424 yards and two touchdowns, earning NFC Offensive Player of the Week honors for the third time in his career. Tight end Tyler Higbee caught seven passes for 107 yards and a touchdown, while Robert Woods had 13 receptions for 172 yards, both single-game career highs for the veteran wide receiver. Running back Todd Gurley added 95 rushing yards and a touchdown on 19 carries as the Rams built a 27–0 lead midway through the third quarter. Defensively, Los Angeles was equally dominant, combining for six sacks of Cardinals quarterback Kyler Murray. Under constant pressure throughout the game, Murray rushed a pass that was picked off by rookie safety Taylor Rapp, who returned his first career interception 31 yards for a touchdown and a 34-7 Rams lead. Aaron Donald had 1.5 sacks, while linebacker Cory Littleton led the team with eight total tackles, including a sack.

==== Week 14: vs. Seattle Seahawks ====
Week Fourteen: Seattle Seahawks at Los Angeles Rams – Game summary

Quarter	1	2	3	4	Total
Seahawks	3	0	6	3	**12**
**Rams**	7	14	0	7	**28**

at Los Angeles Memorial Coliseum, Los Angeles, California

- Date: December 8
- Game time: 5:20 pm. PST
- Game weather: Cloudy, 60 °F (16 °C)
- Game attendance: 71,501
- Referee: Shawn Hochuli
- TV announcers (NBC): Al Michaels, Cris Collinsworth, Michele Tafoya and Terry McAulay
- Recap, Game Book

Game information

**First quarter**

- SEA – Jason Myers 39-yard field goal, 8:34. Seahawks 3–0. **Drive: 11 plays, 54 yards, 6:26.**
- LAR – Malcolm Brown 1-yard run (Greg Zuerlein kick), 5:08. Rams 7–3. **Drive: 8 plays, 75 yards, 3:26.**

**Second quarter**

- LAR – Robert Woods 2-yard pass from Jared Goff (Greg Zuerlein kick), 11:28. Rams 14–3. **Drive: 12 plays, 85 yards, 6:29.**
- LAR – Cooper Kupp 10-yard pass from Jared Goff (Greg Zuerlein kick), 0:51. Rams 21–3. **Drive: 10 plays, 72 yards, 3:13.**

**Third quarter**

- SEA – Quandre Diggs 55-yard interception return (kick failed, wide left), 12:54. Rams 21–9.

**Fourth quarter**

- LAR – Todd Gurley 7-yard run (Greg Zuerlein kick), 11:07. Rams 28–9. **Drive: 7 plays, 95 yards, 3:40.**
- SEA – Jason Myers 34-yard field goal, 7:03. Rams 28–12. **Drive: 13 plays, 59 yards, 4:04.**

**Top passers**

- SEA – Russell Wilson – 22/36, 245 yards, INT
- LAR – Jared Goff – 22/31, 293 yards, 2 TD, 2 INT

**Top rushers**

- SEA – Chris Carson – 15 rushes, 76 yards
- LAR – Todd Gurley – 23 rushes, 79 yards, TD

**Top receivers**

- SEA – DK Metcalf – 6 receptions, 78 yards
- LAR – Tyler Higbee – 7 receptions, 116 yards

Playing again at home in front of a national TV audience for the third time in four weeks, the Rams boosted their record to 8–5 with a strong Sunday Night Football win over the visiting Seahawks. After giving up a field goal to Seattle, the Rams took the lead for good on Malcolm Brown's 1-yard touchdown run with just over five minutes left in the first quarter, capping off an 8-play, 75-yard drive. In the second period, Jared Goff threw touchdown passes to wide receivers Robert Woods and Cooper Kupp, the latter coming with 51 seconds remaining to give Los Angeles a 21–3 lead. The Rams offense sputtered in the third period as Goff threw interceptions on his team's first two drives, including one returned 55 yards by safety Quandre Diggs for a Seattle touchdown. At the start of the fourth quarter, Goff found tight end Tyler Higbee for a 32-yard gain on a screen pass to spark a drive. Woods caught a 20-yard pass, then ran twice for 29 yards to give the Rams a first-and-goal at the Seattle 7. From there, Todd Gurley scored his ninth rushing touchdown of the season, finishing the play with a stiff-arm of Seahawks cornerback Tre Flowers. Gurley finished with 79 yards on 23 carries, while Higbee led the Rams on offense with seven receptions for 116 yards. On defense, linebacker Cory Littleton had 10 total tackles (eight solo) while fellow linebacker Samson Ebukam had two of the Rams' five sacks of Seahawks quarterback Russell Wilson.

==== Week 15: at Dallas Cowboys ====
Week Fifteen: Los Angeles Rams at Dallas Cowboys – Game summary

Quarter	1	2	3	4	Total
Rams	0	7	0	14	**21**
**Cowboys**	7	21	3	13	**44**

at AT&T Stadium, Arlington, Texas

- Date: December 15
- Game time: 3:25 p.m. CST/1:25 pm. PST
- Game weather: TBD (retractable roof stadium)
- Game attendance: 90,436
- Referee: Walt Anderson
- TV announcers (Fox): Joe Buck, Troy Aikman and Erin Andrews
- Recap, Game Book

Game information

**First quarter**

- DAL – Jason Witten 19-yard pass from Dak Prescott (Kai Forbath kick), 1:47. Cowboys 7-0. **Drive: 15 plays, 90 yards, 6:21.**

**Second quarter**

- LAR – Todd Gurley 2-yard pass from Jared Goff (Greg Zuerlein kick), 12:58. Tied 7-7. **Drive: 9 plays, 75 yards, 3:49.**
- DAL – Tavon Austin 59-yard pass from Dak Prescott (Kai Forbath kick), 11:37. Cowboys 14-7. **Drive: 3 plays, 75 yards, 1:21.**
- DAL – Ezekiel Elliott 1-yard run (Kai Forbath kick), 1:57. Cowboys 21-7. **Drive: 14 plays, 97 yards, 7:57.**
- DAL – Ezekiel Elliott 3-yard run (Kai Forbath kick), 0:16. Cowboys 28-7. **Drive: 3 plays, 9 yards, 1:00.**

**Third quarter**

- DAL – Kai Forbath 50-yard field goal, 11:09. Cowboys 31-7. **Drive: 8 plays, 43 yards, 3:51.**

**Fourth quarter**

- DAL – Kai Forbath 42-yard field goal, 14:56. Cowboys 34-7. **Drive: 7 plays, 40 yards, 3:49.**
- DAL – Kai Forbath 42-yard field goal, 6:40. Cowboys 37-7. **Drive: 10 plays, 57 yards, 6:59.**
- LAR – Todd Gurley 7-yard run (Todd Gurley run), 3:17. Cowboys 37-15. **Drive: 12 plays, 75 yards, 3:23.**
- DAL – Tony Pollard 44-yard run (Kai Forbath kick), 3:00. Cowboys 44-15. **Drive: 2 plays, 46 yards, 0:17.**
- LAR – Cooper Kupp 7-yard pass from Jared Goff (pass failed), 0:40. Cowboys 44-21. **Drive: 11 plays, 60 yards, 2:20.**

**Top passers**

- LAR – Jared Goff – 33/51, 284 yards, 2 TD, INT
- DAL – Dak Prescott – 15/23, 212 yards, 2 TD

**Top rushers**

- LAR – Todd Gurley – 11 rushes, 20 yards, TD
- DAL – Tony Pollard – 12 rushes, 131 yards, TD

**Top receivers**

- LAR – Tyler Higbee – 12 receptions, 111 yards
- DAL – Tavon Austin – 1 reception, 59 yards, TD

The Rams' playoff hopes suffered a devastating blow as the host Cowboys took control with three unanswered touchdowns in the second quarter. After Jared Goff's 2-yard touchdown pass to Todd Gurley tied the score at 7-7, Dallas wide receiver Tavon Austin haunted his former team with a 59-yard touchdown reception from Dak Prescott. Cowboys running back Ezekiel Elliott then scored two touchdowns in the quarter's final two minutes, the first a 1-yard run to cap off a 14-play, 97-yard drive, and the second coming four plays after a Goff interception to put Dallas ahead 28–7 at halftime. Elliott (24 carries, 117 yards) and fellow running back Tony Pollard (12 carries, 131 yards) helped the Cowboys dominate offensively. For the Rams, Gurley scored a rushing touchdown while Goff threw a TD pass to Cooper Kupp in the game's final minute. Tight end Tyler Higbee caught 12 passes for 111 yards, while on defense the Rams were held without a sack.

==== Week 16: at San Francisco 49ers ====
Week Sixteen: Los Angeles Rams at San Francisco 49ers – Game summary

Quarter	1	2	3	4	Total
Rams	7	14	7	3	**31**
**49ers**	3	21	0	10	**34**

at Levi's Stadium, Santa Clara, California

- Date: December 21
- Game time: 5:15 pm. PST
- Game weather: Cloudy, 58 °F (14 °C)
- Game attendance: 70,103
- Referee: Clete Blakeman
- TV announcers (NFLN/KCBS): Kevin Burkhardt, Charles Davis and Pam Oliver
- Recap, Game Book

Game information

**First quarter**

- LAR – Brandin Cooks 10-yard pass from Jared Goff (Greg Zuerlein kick), 11:08. Rams 7–0. **Drive: 7 plays, 75 yards, 3:52.**
- SF – Robbie Gould 26-yard field goal, 8:35. Rams 7–3. **Drive: 6 plays, 10 yard, 2:23.**

**Second quarter**

- LAR – Todd Gurley 5-yard run (Greg Zuerlein kick), 14:55. Rams 14–3. **Drive: 9 plays, 63 yards, 4:01.**
- SF – Deebo Samuel 19-yard run (Robbie Gould kick), 12:06. Rams 14–10. **Drive: 5 plays, 75 yards, 2:49.**
- LAR – Todd Gurley 1-yard run (Greg Zuerlein kick), 6:47. Rams 21–10. **Drive: 11 plays, 64 yards, 5:19.**
- SF – Raheem Mostert 16-yard run (Robbie Gould kick), 2:21. Rams 21–17. **Drive: 9 plays, 75 yards, 4:26.**
- SF – Fred Warner 46-yard interception return (Robbie Gould kick), 0:46. 49ers 24–21.

**Third quarter**

- LAR – Cooper Kupp 22-yard pass from Jared Goff (Greg Zuerlein kick), 5:06. Rams 28–24. **Drive: 7 plays, 68 yards, 2:43.**

**Fourth quarter**

- SF – George Kittle 7-yard pass from Jimmy Garoppolo (Robbie Gould kick), 6:06. 49ers 31–28. **Drive: 6 plays, 91 yards, 2:48.**
- LAR – Greg Zuerlein 52-yard field goal, 2:30. Tied 31–31. **Drive: 8 plays, 41 yard, 3:36.**
- SF – Robbie Gould 33-yard field goal, 0:00. 49ers 34–31. **Drive: 9 plays, 60 yard, 2:30.**

**Top passers**

- LAR – Jared Goff – 27/46, 323 yards, 2 TD, INT
- SF – Jimmy Garoppolo – 16/27, 248 yards, TD, INT

**Top rushers**

- LAR – Todd Gurley – 15 rushes, 48 yards, 2 TD
- SF – Raheem Mostert – 11 rushes, 53 yards, TD

**Top receivers**

- LAR – Robert Woods – 8 receptions, 117 yards
- SF – George Kittle – 5 receptions, 79 yards, TD

Taking on the NFC's top team, the Rams battled the 49ers in a wild showdown, but critical errors in the final minute of both halves doomed Los Angeles, which eliminated them from the playoff race with the loss. Wide receiver Brandin Cooks scored only his second touchdown of the season on the Rams' opening drive on a 10-yard pass from Jared Goff, while Todd Gurley added another score on a 5-yard touchdown run on the first play of the second quarter. Gurley scored again on a 1-yard run midway through the second period, giving him 58 rushing touchdowns for his career, tying him with Hall of Fame predecessor Marshall Faulk for the most in Rams franchise history. With a 21–10 lead, the Rams seemed poised for an upset, but after the defense gave up a touchdown run to Raheem Mostert, Goff threw an interception to 49er linebacker Fred Warner, who ran untouched 46 yards to put San Francisco in front 24-21 just 46 seconds before halftime. The Rams reclaimed the lead late in the third period as Goff connected with wide receiver Cooper Kupp for a 22-yard scoring pass. The 49ers answered with tight end George Kittle's 7-yard touchdown pass from quarterback Jimmy Garoppolo midway through the fourth quarter to lead 31–28. Greg Zuerlein's 52-yard field goal tied the game at 31–31 with 2:30 remaining, but the 49ers prevailed as they twice converted on third-and-16 plays. Garoppolo, who was sacked six times, hit eight times and intercepted twice, made both clutch throws, the last one a 46-yard completion down the middle to wide receiver Emmanuel Sanders which set up kicker Robbie Gould's successful 33-yard field goal as time ran out. Goff passed for 323 yards, but his pick six late in the second quarter proved costly. Wide receiver Robert Woods had eight receptions for 117 yards, while tight end Tyler Higbee had nine catches for 104 yards, his fourth straight game over 100 yards. Defensively, Rams' linebacker Dante Fowler had 2.5 sacks and Jalen Ramsey added an interception, but a miscommunication between him and rookie safety Taylor Rapp led to a blown coverage that gave the 49ers their final scoring opportunity. With the loss, the Rams fell to 8–7 and were eliminated from playoff contention for the first time since 2016 and for the first time under Sean McVay as the head coach. It was also the last game the team wore their white St. Louis color scheme jerseys.

==== Week 17: vs. Arizona Cardinals ====
Week Seventeen: Arizona Cardinals at Los Angeles Rams – Game summary

Quarter	1	2	3	4	Total
Cardinals	7	3	7	7	**24**
**Rams**	3	14	0	14	**31**

at Los Angeles Memorial Coliseum, Los Angeles, California

- Date: December 29
- Game time: 1:25 pm. PST
- Game weather: Cloudy, 62 °F (17 °C)
- Game attendance: 68,665
- Referee: Jerome Boger
- TV announcers (Fox): Chris Myers, Daryl Johnston and Laura Okmin
- Recap, Game Book

Game information

**First quarter**

- LAR – Greg Zuerlein 47-yard field goal, 9:12. Rams 3-0. **Drive: 12 plays, 46 yards, 5:48.**
- ARI – Dan Arnold 23-yard pass from Kyler Murray (Zane Gonzalez kick), 3:54. Cardinals 7-3. **Drive: 2 plays, 22 yards, 0:44.**

**Second quarter**

- LAR – Malcolm Brown 3-yard run (Greg Zuerlein kick), 10:54. Rams 10-7. **Drive:11 plays, 47 yards, 4:34.**
- LAR – Cooper Kupp 6-yard pass from Jared Goff (Greg Zuerlein kick), 3:49. Rams 17-7. **Drive: 3 plays, 8 yards, 1:39.**
- ARI – Zane Gonzalez 31-yard field goal, 0:04. Rams 17-10. **Drive: 9 plays, 55 yards, 0:56.**

**Third quarter**

- ARI – Damiere Byrd 3-yard pass from Kyler Murray (Zane Gonzalez kick), 4:43. Tied 17-17. **Drive: 10 plays, 67 yards, 4:45.**

**Fourth quarter**

- LAR – Tyler Higbee 4-yard pass from Jared Goff (Greg Zuerlein kick), 13:34. Rams 24-17. **Drive: 12 plays, 70 yards, 6:09.**
- LAR – Robert Woods 11-yard pass from Jared Goff (Greg Zuerlein kick), 7:52. Rams 31-17. **Drive: 8 plays, 81 yards, 3:34.**
- ARI – Kenyan Drake 1-yard run (Zane Gonzalez kick), 3:59. Rams 31-24. 'Drive: 9 plays, 60 yards, 3:59

**Top passers**

- ARI – Kyler Murray – 26/42, 325 yards, 2 TD, 2 INT
- LAR – Jared Goff – 29/45, 319 yards, 3 TD

**Top rushers**

- ARI – Kenyan Drake – 12 rushes, 60 yards, TD
- LAR – Todd Gurley – 20 rushes, 68 yards

**Top receivers**

- ARI – Dan Arnold – 4 receptions, 76 yards, TD
- LAR – Cooper Kupp – 7 receptions, 99 yards, TD

The Rams avoided the mistakes that had plagued them the entire season to end 2019 with a victory in the team's final game played at the Los Angeles Memorial Coliseum. Quarterback Jared Goff passed for 319 yards and three touchdowns to three different receivers. Running back Malcolm Brown added the other Rams touchdown, while kicker Greg Zuerlein converted a 47-yard field goal on L.A.'s opening drive. Punter Johnny Hekker punted four times and had three downed inside the 20, a performance which earned him NFC Special Teams Player of the Week honors for Week 17. Safety Eric Weddle had seven tackles to lead the Rams on defense. Safety Taylor Rapp and cornerback Darious Williams both had interceptions of Cardinals rookie quarterback Kyler Murray, who also lost two fumbles (one recovered by Rapp, the other by linebacker Cory Littleton) as the Rams recorded their sixth straight win versus Arizona. With the victory the Rams finished 9–7, an identical record to the 1979 season, when the Rams last bade farewell to the Coliseum (losing their final game at home 29–14 to New Orleans). In their four-year return, the Rams finished with a 16–15 record at the venue (including playoffs). After starting 4-11 the first two seasons (including a playoff loss in 2017 to the Atlanta Falcons), the Rams went 12-4 their final two years at home (including their 2018 win against the Dallas Cowboys in the divisional round of the playoffs), including a 4–3 mark in 2019. A special logo noting the Rams' history at the Coliseum was worn by Rams players for the game and also painted at midfield along with classic blue and yellow patterns in the end zone reflecting the team's past in the stadium, which it called home for 38 total seasons.

=== Standings ===
==== Division ====
NFC West
	W	L	T	PCT	DIV	CONF	PF	PA	STK
^{(1)} San Francisco 49ers	13	3	0	.813	5–1	10–2	479	310	W2
^{(5)} Seattle Seahawks	11	5	0	.688	3–3	8–4	405	398	L2
Los Angeles Rams	9	7	0	.563	3–3	7–5	394	364	W1
Arizona Cardinals	5	10	1	.344	1–5	3–8–1	361	442	L1

==== Conference ====
NFC
#	Team	Division	W	L	T	PCT	DIV	CONF	SOS	SOV	STK
**Division leaders**
1 (Note: San Francisco finished ahead of Green Bay and New Orleans based on head-to-head sweep, claiming the No. 1 seed.)	San Francisco 49ers	West	13	3	0	.813	5–1	10–2	.504	.466	W2
2 (Note: Green Bay claimed the No. 2 seed over New Orleans based on conference record.)	Green Bay Packers	North	13	3	0	.813	6–0	10–2	.453	.428	W5
3	New Orleans Saints	South	13	3	0	.813	5–1	9–3	.486	.459	W3
4	Philadelphia Eagles	East	9	7	0	.563	5–1	7–5	.455	.417	W4
**Wild Cards**
5	Seattle Seahawks	West	11	5	0	.688	3–3	8–4	.531	.463	L2
6	Minnesota Vikings	North	10	6	0	.625	2–4	7–5	.477	.356	L2
**Did not qualify for the postseason**
7	Los Angeles Rams	West	9	7	0	.563	3–3	7–5	.535	.438	W1
8 (Note: Chicago finished ahead of Dallas based on head-to-head victory.)	Chicago Bears	North	8	8	0	.500	4–2	7–5	.508	.383	W1
9	Dallas Cowboys	East	8	8	0	.500	5–1	7–5	.479	.316	W1
10 (Note: Atlanta finished ahead of Tampa Bay based on division record.)	Atlanta Falcons	South	7	9	0	.438	4–2	6–6	.545	.518	W4
11	Tampa Bay Buccaneers	South	7	9	0	.438	2–4	5–7	.500	.384	L2
12	Arizona Cardinals	West	5	10	1	.344	1–5	3–8–1	.529	.375	L1
13	Carolina Panthers	South	5	11	0	.313	1–5	2–10	.549	.469	L8
14	New York Giants	East	4	12	0	.250	2–4	3–9	.473	.281	L1
15	Detroit Lions	North	3	12	1	.219	0–6	2–9–1	.506	.375	L9
16	Washington Redskins	East	3	13	0	.188	0–6	2–10	.502	.281	L4
**Tiebreakers** (Note: When breaking ties for three or more teams under the NFL's rules, they are first broken within divisions, then comparing only the highest-ranked remaining team from each division.)

== Awards and honors ==
Recipient	awards
Aaron Donald	Week 11: NFC Defensive Player of the Week
Jared Goff	Week 13: NFC Offensive Player of the Week
Johnny Hekker	Week 17: NFC Special Teams Player of the Week
