= Dante Fowler =

American football player (born 1994)

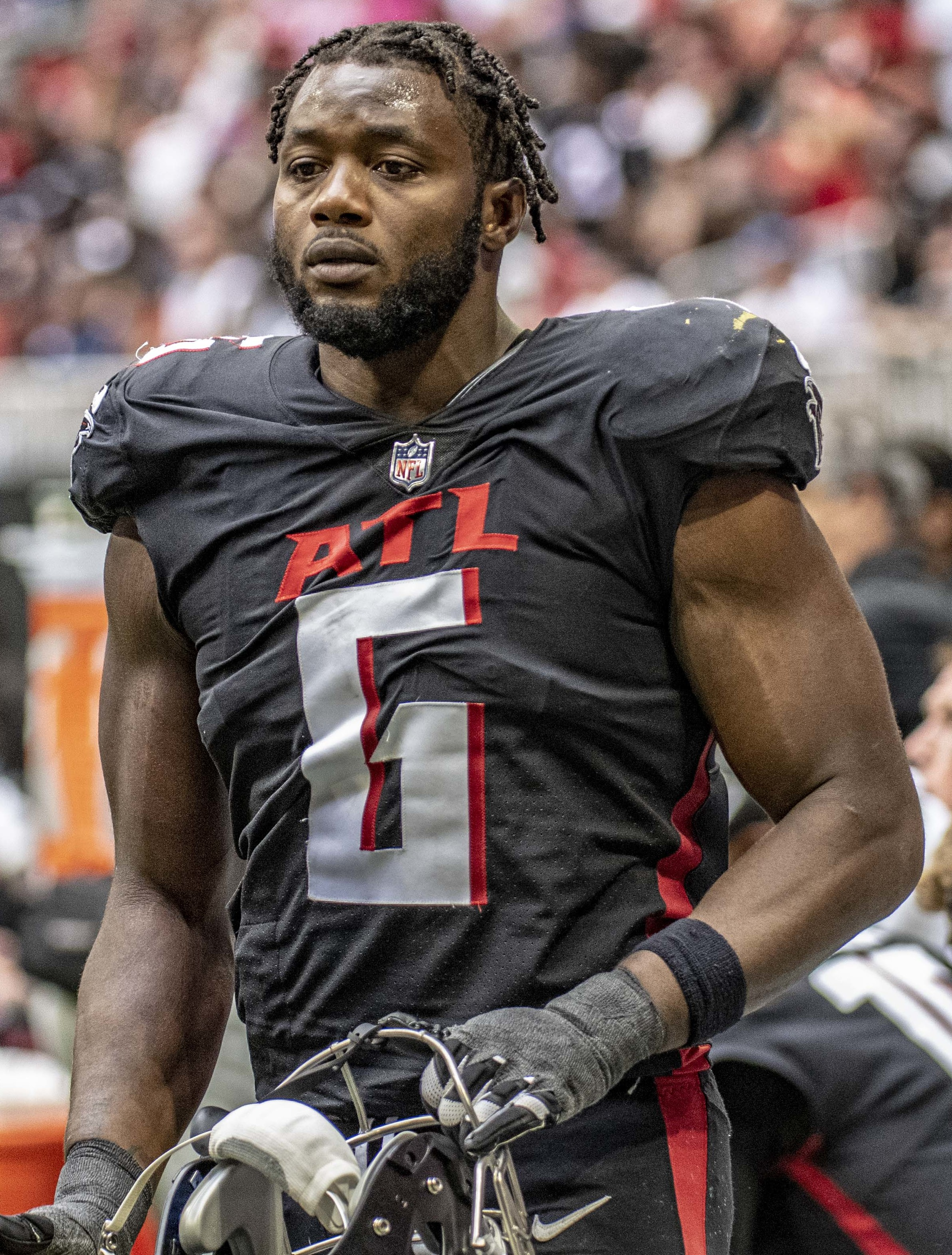
- Fowler with the Atlanta Falcons in 2021

No. 56 – Seattle Seahawks
- Position: Outside linebacker
- Roster status: Active

Personal information
- Born: August 3, 1994 (age 32); St. Petersburg, Florida, U.S.
- Listed height: 6 ft 3 in (1.91 m)
- Listed weight: 264 lb (120 kg)

Career information
- High school: Lakewood (St. Petersburg)
- College: Florida (2012–2014)
- NFL draft: 2015: 1st round, 3rd overall pick

Career history
- Jacksonville Jaguars (2015–2018); Los Angeles Rams (2018–2019); Atlanta Falcons (2020–2021); Dallas Cowboys (2022–2023); Washington Commanders (2024); Dallas Cowboys (2025); Seattle Seahawks (2026–present)

Awards and highlights
- First-team All-SEC (2014); Second-team All-SEC (2013)

Career NFL statistics as of Week 9, 2026
- Tackles: 297
- Sacks: 59.5
- Pass deflections: 23
- Interceptions: 1
- Forced fumbles: 16
- Fumble recoveries: 5
- Touchdowns: 3
- Stats at Pro Football Reference

Dante Antwane Fowler Jr. (born August 3, 1994) is an American professional football outside linebacker for the Seattle Seahawks of the National Football League (NFL). He played college football for the Florida Gators and was selected third overall by the Jacksonville Jaguars in the 2015 NFL draft. Fowler missed his entire rookie season after sustaining an ACL tear. He has also played for the Los Angeles Rams, Atlanta Falcons, Dallas Cowboys, and Washington Commanders.

== Early life ==
Fowler attended Lakewood High School in St. Petersburg, Florida, where he was a two-sport star in football and track. Fowler was named an honorable mention to the Sports Illustrated All-American football team following his senior season, and was selected to the 2012 Under Armour All-America Game.

In track, Fowler competed as a shot putter, recording a top throw of 14.32 meters (47 ft).

== College career ==
Fowler accepted a football scholarship from the University of Florida. As a freshman in 2012, Fowler moved to the outside linebacker position. Fowler played in all 13 games and started his first game against Missouri. He recorded 30 tackles, including eight for loss, and 2.5 sacks. He was named to numerous freshman all-American teams.

As a sophomore in 2013, Fowler started all 13 games for the Gators and was named a team captain for the two final games of the season. He recorded 50 tackles, including 10.5 for loss, and 3.5 sacks.

As a junior in 2014, he slimmed down from 277 to 261 pounds, in an effort to be a more explosive edge player for the Gators. He recorded 60 tackles, including 15 for loss, 8.5 sacks, and two forced fumbles, and was named a first-team All-Southeastern Conference selection by the conference's coaches. In his final game, the 2015 Birmingham Bowl vs East Carolina, he recorded three sacks helping the Gators to the 28–20 victory.

On November 19, 2014, Fowler tweeted that he would leave the school with Will Muschamp, who announced he would step down as head coach. Fowler made his intentions to forgo his remaining eligibility and enter the 2015 NFL draft.

== Professional career ==
Pre-draft measurables
Height	Weight	Arm length	Hand span	Wingspan	40-yard dash	10-yard split	20-yard split	20-yard shuttle	Three-cone drill	Vertical jump	Broad jump	Bench press
6 ft 2 5/8 in (1.90 m)	261 lb (118 kg)	33 3/4 in (0.86 m)	9 1/2 in (0.24 m)	6 ft 8 3/8 in (2.04 m)	4.60 s	1.59 s	2.69 s	4.32 s	7.40 s	32.5 in (0.83 m)	9 ft 4 in (2.84 m)	19 reps
All values from NFL Combine

=== Jacksonville Jaguars ===
Fowler was selected third overall by the Jacksonville Jaguars in the 2015 NFL draft. On May 8, 2015, Fowler tore his ACL on the first day, and opening drill of mini-camp and missed the entirety of his rookie season. On May 12, four days after tearing his ACL, Fowler signed a fully guaranteed four-year, $23.5 million contract, with a $15.3 million signing bonus.

After missing his entire rookie year due to his ACL injury, Fowler made his NFL debut on September 11, 2016, in the game against the Green Bay Packers, where he made three tackles (one for a loss) as the Jaguars lost the game 27–23. Fowler ended his first official season playing in all 16 games with one start, recording 32 tackles, 4 sacks, and five passes defensed.

On September 10, 2017, in the 29–7 season-opening road victory over the Houston Texans, Fowler had a stellar game. He had a 53-yard fumble return for a touchdown near the end of the first half. The touchdown was the first of his NFL career. Late in the third quarter, Fowler forced a fumble off of quarterback Deshaun Watson, which was recovered by teammate Yannick Ngakoue. He finished the 2017 season with eight sacks, 21 tackles, two forced fumbles, and two fumble recoveries. The Jaguars finished atop the AFC South with a 10–6 record. In the playoffs, Fowler recorded five tackles, two sacks, and a pass deflection before the Jaguars were defeated 24–20 by the New England Patriots in the AFC Championship Game.

On May 2, 2018, the Jaguars declined the fifth-year option on Fowler's contract. On July 20, 2018, he was suspended for one game due to violating the league's personal conduct policy. In December 2019, the NFLPA revealed that it had won a grievance filed on Fowler's behalf alleging that the Jaguars had improperly fined Fowler over $700,000 for not attending rehab and medical appointments in Jacksonville during the 2018 offseason. Under the collective bargaining agreement, these appointments should have been voluntary. This incident reportedly led to the firing of Jaguars football operations chief Tom Coughlin.

=== Los Angeles Rams ===
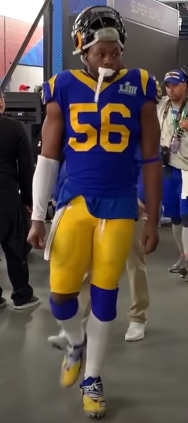
Fowler with the Los Angeles Rams following their loss in Super Bowl LIII, 2019

On October 30, 2018, Fowler was traded to the Los Angeles Rams in exchange for a compensatory third-round selection (Quincy Williams) in the 2019 NFL draft and a fifth-round selection in the 2020 NFL draft, which ended up being used to select Collin Johnson. Due to a change to the 3–4 defense, Fowler moved to right outside linebacker with the Rams. In eight games in the 2018 season, Fowler finished with 21 tackles, two sacks, a pass defended, and a forced fumble. In the playoffs, the Rams defeated the Dallas Cowboys in the Divisional Round and Fowler recorded 2 tackles and a sack. In the NFC Championship Game against the New Orleans Saints, Fowler recorded 5 tackles and 0.5 sacks in a 26–23 overtime victory to advance to Super Bowl LIII and Fowler made a huge play in overtime when he hit Drew Brees to set up an interception by John Johnson III. The Rams played the Patriots in the Super Bowl but lost 13–3. Fowler recorded four tackles in the loss.

On March 11, 2019, Fowler signed a one-year, $14 million contract extension with the Rams. In the season-opener against the Carolina Panthers, Fowler sacked Cam Newton twice as the Rams won on the road by a score of 30–27. During Week 7 against the Atlanta Falcons, he sacked Matt Ryan three times in the 37–10 road victory. Three weeks later against the Pittsburgh Steelers, Fowler recovered a fumbled snap by center Maurkice Pouncey and returned it for a 26 yard touchdown in the 17–12 road loss. During Week 16 against the San Francisco 49ers, he sacked Jimmy Garoppolo 2.5 times during a 34–31 road loss. He finished the 2019 season with 11.5 sacks, 58 tackles, six passes defended, two forced fumbles, and one fumble recovery for a touchdown.

=== Atlanta Falcons ===
On March 25, 2020, Fowler signed a three-year, $48 million contract with the Falcons. He reunited with head coach Dan Quinn, who was his defensive coordinator at the University of Florida. He started in 14 games at right defensive end, recording 22 tackles (4 for loss), 3 sacks and eight quarterback pressures. He had 2 tackles and 3 quarterback pressures against the Carolina Panthers. He was placed on the reserve/COVID-19 list by the team on November 14, 2020, and activated on November 25.

In 2021, the team changed to a 3–4 defense and Fowler was switched to right outside linebacker. He was passed on the depth chart by rookie Adetokunbo Ogundeji. He appeared in 14 games with six starts, registering 36 tackles (6 for loss), 4.5 sacks (led the team), 8 quarterback pressures and a career-best three forced fumbles. On October 22, 2021, Fowler was placed on injured reserve (IR) with a knee injury. On November 14, 2021, Fowler was activated from IR in time to be active for week 10 game versus the Cowboys. He had a career-high three tackles for loss, one sack and one quarterback pressure against the Carolina Panthers.

He was released on February 16, 2022.

=== Dallas Cowboys (first stint) ===
On March 18, 2022, Fowler signed a one-year contract with the Dallas Cowboys. He reunited with defensive coordinator Dan Quinn, who was his head coach with the Atlanta Falcons. He appeared in all 17 games as a pass rushing specialist at defensive end, collecting 20 tackles (3 for loss), 6 sacks and 29 quarterback pressures. He had one tackle, one sack, 2 quarterback pressures, one pass breakup and one force fumble against the Cincinnati Bengals. He made 4 tackles (one for loss), one sack and 3 quarterback pressures against the Chicago Bears.

He signed another one-year contract with the team on March 21, 2023. He remained as a backup rotational player at defensive end, appearing in all 17 games, posting 13 tackles (5 for loss), 4 sacks and 7 quarterback pressures.

=== Washington Commanders ===
On March 15, 2024, Fowler signed a one-year contract with the Washington Commanders. The signing kept him united with Dan Quinn, who became the team's new head coach and was a key factor of Fowler's decision to sign with the Commanders. Under the defensive scheme implemented by Quinn and Joe Whitt Jr., Fowler played an outside linebacker/edge role.

In Week 6 against the Carolina Panthers, Fowler recorded his first career interception, returning it 67 yards for a touchdown. In Week 9 against the New York Giants, he posted 6 tackles, 2 sacks, 2 quarterback pressures, and one forced fumble. As the season progressed, Fowler’s presence on the edge helped bolster the Commanders’ defensive line.

=== Dallas Cowboys (second stint) ===
On March 14, 2025, Fowler signed a one-year, $8 million contract with the Dallas Cowboys. He finished the 2025 season with three sacks, 15 tackles, and three passes defended.

=== Seattle Seahawks ===
On May 11, 2026, Fowler signed a one-year, $5 million contract with the Seattle Seahawks.

== NFL career statistics ==
Legend
	Led the league
**Bold**	Career high

=== Regular season ===
Year	Team	Games		Tackles					Fumbles				Interceptions			
Year	Team	GP	GS	Cmb	Solo	Ast	Sck	TFL	FF	FR	Yds	TD	Int	Yds	TD	PD
2015	JAX	Injured														
2016	JAX	16	1	32	23	9	4.0	6	0	0	0	0	0	0	0	5
2017	JAX	16	0	21	18	3	8.0	7	2	**2**	**53**	**1**	0	0	0	0
2018	JAX	7	0	9	8	1	2.0	1	1	1	0	0	0	0	0	0
2018	LAR	8	6	21	15	6	2.0	4	1	1	0	0	0	0	0	1
2019	LAR	16	14	**58**	**40**	**18**	**11.5**	**16**	2	1	26	**1**	0	0	0	**6**
2020	ATL	14	13	23	12	11	3.0	4	1	0	0	0	0	0	0	1
2021	ATL	14	6	36	21	15	4.5	6	**3**	0	0	0	0	0	0	1
2022	DAL	17	0	27	22	5	6.0	7	2	0	0	0	0	0	0	2
2023	DAL	17	0	13	8	5	4.0	5	1	0	0	0	0	0	0	3
2024	WAS	17	7	39	25	14	10.5	14	2	0	0	0	**1**	**67**	**1**	1
2025	DAL	17	11	15	10	5	3.0	4	0	0	0	0	0	0	0	3
2026	SEA	9	0	3	3	0	1.0	0	1	0	0	0	0	0	0	0
Career		168	58	297	205	92	59.5	74	16	5	79	2	1	67	1	23

=== Postseason ===
Year	Team	Games		Tackles					Fumbles				Interceptions			
Year	Team	GP	GS	Cmb	Solo	Ast	Sck	TFL	FF	FR	Yds	TD	Int	Yds	TD	PD
2017	JAX	3	0	5	5	0	**2.0**	2	0	0	0	0	0	0	0	**1**
2018	LAR	3	3	**12**	**8**	**4**	1.5	**4**	0	0	0	0	0	0	0	0
2022	DAL	2	0	1	1	0	0.0	0	0	0	0	0	0	0	0	0
2023	DAL	1	0	0	0	0	0.0	0	0	0	0	0	0	0	0	0
2024	WAS	3	2	5	3	2	0.0	1	0	0	0	0	0	0	0	0
Career		12	5	23	17	6	3.5	7	0	0	0	0	0	0	0	1

== Personal life ==
On July 18, 2017, Fowler was arrested in St. Petersburg, Florida for simple battery and committing mischief. Fowler confronted a man who commented about his driving, struck the man, broke his glasses, and threw a bag containing liquor into a lake. He was released from jail the next day on a $650 bond.

On March 1, 2018, Fowler pleaded no contest to battery, criminal mischief, and petty theft. He was fined $2,575, received a year of probation, and was ordered to undergo 75 hours of community service. His younger brother Donterio Fowler was arrested in July 2021 in connection with a 2016 murder of a Florida International University student.
