= Michael Brockers =

American football player (born 1990)

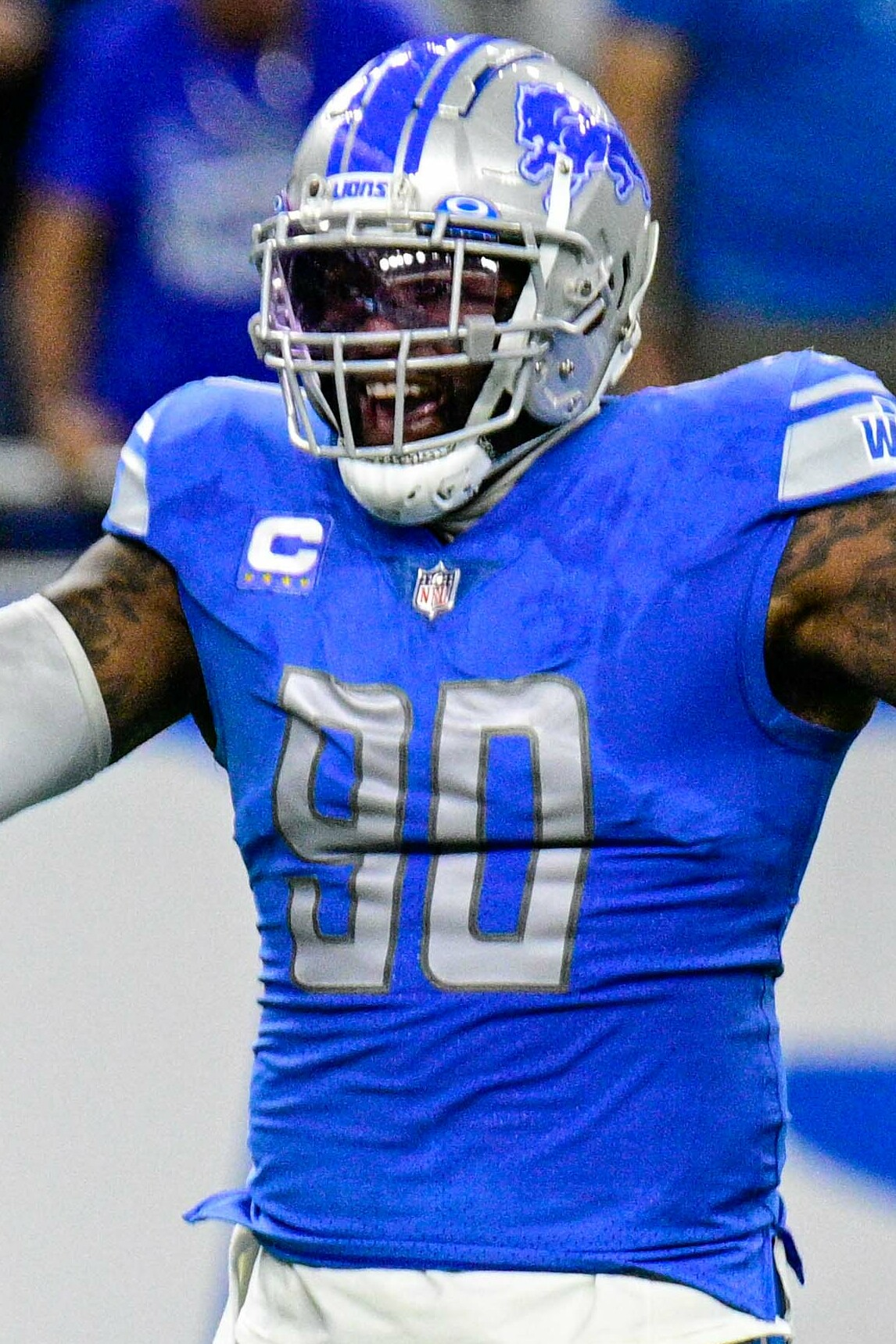
- Brockers with the Detroit Lions in 2022

No. 90, 91
- Position: Defensive tackle

Personal information
- Born: December 21, 1990 (age 35); Houston, Texas, U.S.
- Listed height: 6 ft 5 in (1.96 m)
- Listed weight: 297 lb (135 kg)

Career information
- High school: Chávez (Houston)
- College: LSU (2009–2011)
- NFL draft: 2012: 1st round, 14th overall pick

Career history
- St. Louis / Los Angeles Rams (2012–2020); Detroit Lions (2021–2022)

Awards and highlights
- PFWA All-Rookie Team (2012); Second-team All-SEC (2011)

Career NFL statistics
- Total tackles: 451
- Sacks: 29.0
- Forced fumbles: 2
- Fumble recoveries: 1
- Pass deflections: 10
- Stats at Pro Football Reference

Michael Seth Brockers (born December 21, 1990) is an American former professional football player who was a defensive tackle in the National Football League (NFL). He played college football for the LSU Tigers. He was considered to be one of the best defensive tackle prospects in the 2012 NFL draft, where he was selected by the St. Louis Rams in the first round.

== Early life ==
Brockers attended Chávez High School in Houston, Texas, where he was a two-sport athlete playing football and competed in track & field. During his junior season, he had 59 tackles and 10 sacks. As a senior, he led Chávez High School to the first round of the Texas Class 5A state playoffs, where they lost 31–26 to Humble. Brockers earned first-team All-region and All-state honors. In track & field, Brockers participated in the shot put and the discus.

Brockers was regarded as a four-star recruit by Rivals.com out of high school, he was rated as the No. 10 strong side defensive end prospect in the nation. He accepted a scholarship offer from LSU over other offers from Texas A&M and Texas Tech.

== College career ==
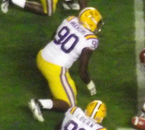
Brockers with the LSU Tigers

Brockers attended Louisiana State University from 2009 to 2011. After redshirting his initial year at LSU, Brockers saw action in all 13 games of the 2010 season, as backing up Lazarius Levingston at left defensive tackle. He made his first career start against Alabama and picked up four tackles in the win over the Crimson Tide. As a sophomore in 2011, he started all 13 games and was third on the team with 9.5 tackles for a loss. He earned a second-team All-SEC selection by the Associated Press.

On January 12, 2012, Brockers announced that he would forgo his remaining two years of eligibility and enter the 2012 NFL draft.

== Professional career ==
Pre-draft measurables
Height	Weight	Arm length	Hand span	Wingspan	40-yard dash	10-yard split	20-yard split	20-yard shuttle	Three-cone drill	Vertical jump	Broad jump	Bench press
6 ft 5 in (1.96 m)	322 lb (146 kg)	35 in (0.89 m)	9 1/8 in (0.23 m)	6 ft 11 7/8 in (2.13 m)	5.18 s	1.73 s	3.01 s	4.78 s	7.46 s	30.0 in (0.76 m)	8 ft 9 in (2.67 m)	21 reps
All values from NFL Combine/Pro Day

=== St. Louis / Los Angeles Rams ===
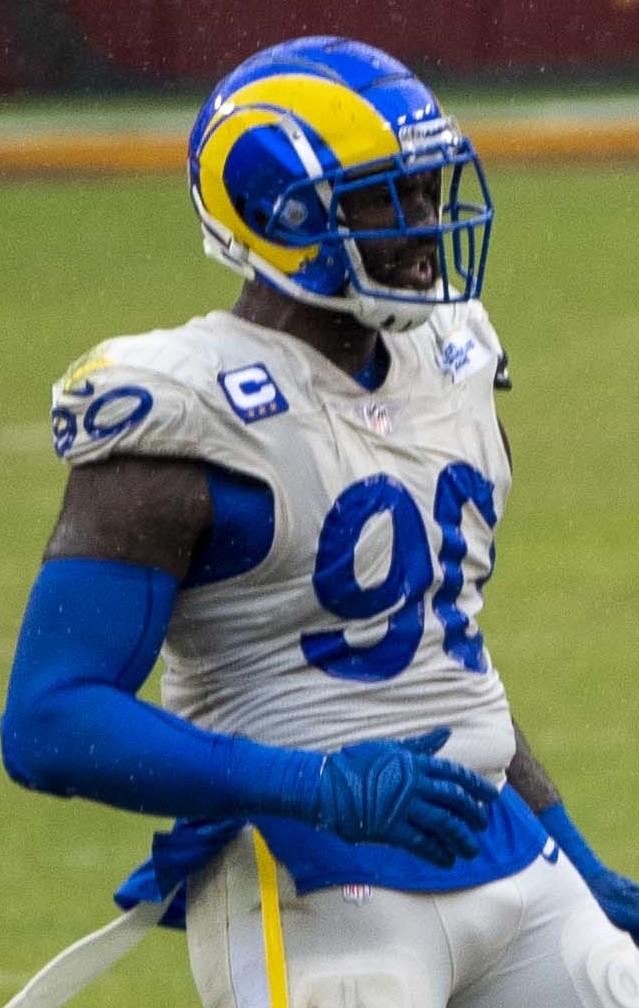
Brockers with the Los Angeles Rams in 2020

The St. Louis Rams selected Brockers in the first round (14th overall) of the 2012 NFL draft. Brockers was the first defensive end drafted in 2012. On June 7, 2012, the Rams signed Brockers to a four-year, $9.52 million contract that includes a signing bonus of $5.36 million. On December 9, 2012, against Buffalo Bills, Brockers ended the game with 7 tackles (4 solo), 1.5 sacks and a forced fumble. As a rookie in 2012, Brockers played 13 games with 33 tackles, four sacks, one pass defended, and one forced fumble. He was named to the PFWA All-Rookie Team.

In 2013, Brockers started all 16 games making 46 tackles, 5.5 sacks, and one forced fumble. In 2014, Brockers started all 16 games with 32 tackles, two sacks, one pass defended, and one fumble recovery. On April 27, 2015, the Rams picked up the fifth-year option of Brockers's rookie contract. During the 2015 season, Brockers played 16 games making 44 tackles and three sacks.

On September 15, 2016, Brockers signed a three-year extension worth $33.125 million and $17 million guaranteed. Brockers finished 2016 by playing 14 games with 19 tackles and 2 passes defended.

In 2017, Brockers played all 16 games, finishing with 55 tackles, 4.5 sacks, and 4 passes defended. In 2018, Brockers played all 16 games, finishing with 54 tackles and a sack. The Rams reached Super Bowl LIII after defeating both the Dallas Cowboys and New Orleans Saints in the playoffs. The Rams played the New England Patriots in the Super Bowl, but lost 13–3 as Brockers recorded 7 tackles.

During the 2020 offseason, it was reported that Brockers was set to sign a three-year, $30 million contract with the Baltimore Ravens; however, the deal fell through due to concerns over his physical. On April 3, 2020, he signed a three-year, $24 million contract to return to the Rams. He was placed on the reserve/COVID-19 list by the team on December 31, 2020, and activated on January 8, 2021.

=== Detroit Lions ===
On March 17, 2021, the Rams traded Brockers to the Detroit Lions for a 2023 seventh round pick. He signed a new three-year, $24 million deal with the team.

On February 24, 2023, Brockers was released by the Lions.

On May 14, 2024, Brockers announced his retirement from the NFL after 11 seasons.

== NFL career statistics ==
Legend
**Bold**	Career high

=== Regular season ===
Year	Team	Games		Tackles					Interceptions					Fumbles			
Year	Team	GP	GS	Cmb	Solo	Ast	Sck	TFL	Int	Yds	TD	Lng	PD	FF	FR	Yds	TD
2012	STL	13	12	31	20	11	4.0	7	0	0	0	0	1	**1**	0	0	0
2013	STL	**16**	**16**	46	38	8	**5.5**	7	0	0	0	0	0	**1**	0	0	0
2014	STL	**16**	**16**	32	24	8	2.0	5	0	0	0	0	1	0	**1**	0	0
2015	STL	**16**	**16**	44	27	17	3.0	**8**	0	0	0	0	0	0	0	0	0
2016	LAR	14	14	19	14	5	0.0	1	0	0	0	0	2	0	0	0	0
2017	LAR	**16**	15	55	**39**	16	4.5	**8**	0	0	0	0	**4**	0	0	0	0
2018	LAR	**16**	**16**	54	33	21	1.0	4	0	0	0	0	0	0	0	0	0
2019	LAR	**16**	**16**	**63**	34	29	3.0	3	0	0	0	0	1	0	0	0	0
2020	LAR	15	15	51	21	**30**	5.0	5	0	0	0	0	0	0	0	0	0
2021	DET	**16**	**16**	52	23	29	1.0	4	0	0	0	0	0	0	0	0	0
2022	DET	6	5	4	1	3	0.0	0	0	0	0	0	1	0	0	0	0
		160	157	451	274	177	29.0	52	0	0	0	0	10	2	1	0	0

=== Playoffs ===
Year	Team	Games		Tackles					Interceptions					Fumbles			
Year	Team	GP	GS	Cmb	Solo	Ast	Sck	TFL	Int	Yds	TD	Lng	PD	FF	FR	Yds	TD
2017	LAR	1	1	1	0	1	**0.5**	0	0	0	0	0	0	0	0	0	0
2018	LAR	**3**	**3**	**13**	**7**	**6**	0.0	0	0	0	0	0	**1**	0	0	0	0
2020	LAR	2	2	9	5	4	0.0	0	0	0	0	0	0	0	0	0	0
		6	6	23	12	11	0.5	0	0	0	0	0	1	0	0	0	0
