= Nsimba Webster =

American football player (born 1996)

Profile
- Positions: Wide receiver, return specialist

Personal information
- Born: January 27, 1996 (age 30); Antioch, California, U.S.
- Listed height: 5 ft 10 in (1.78 m)
- Listed weight: 180 lb (82 kg)

Career information
- High school: Deer Valley (Antioch, California)
- College: Eastern Washington (2014–2018)
- NFL draft: 2019: undrafted

Career history
- Los Angeles Rams (2019–2020); San Francisco 49ers (2021)*; Chicago Bears (2021–2024)
- * Offseason or practice squad member only

Awards and highlights
- First-team All-Big Sky (2018)

Career NFL statistics
- Receptions: 2
- Receiving yards: 14
- Return yards: 620
- Total tackles: 18
- Stats at Pro Football Reference

Nsimba Webster (born January 27, 1996) is an American professional football wide receiver and return specialist. He played college football for the Eastern Washington Eagles and signed with the Los Angeles Rams as an undrafted free agent in 2019.

== College career ==
Webster played at Eastern Washington from 2015 to 2018. During his career with the Eagles, Webster totaled 156 receptions, 2233 receiving yards and 18 touchdowns. His senior season in 2018 was his most productive, when he had 84 receptions, 1,379 yards and 11 touchdowns.

== Professional career ==
Pre-draft measurables
Height	Weight	Arm length	Hand span	40-yard dash	10-yard split	20-yard split	20-yard shuttle	Three-cone drill	Vertical jump	Broad jump	Bench press
5 ft 9 in (1.75 m)	176 lb (80 kg)	30 5/8 in (0.78 m)	9 3/8 in (0.24 m)	4.55 s	1.57 s	2.64 s	4.17 s	6.83 s	31.5 in (0.80 m)	10 ft 1 in (3.07 m)	11 reps
All values from Pro Day

=== Los Angeles Rams ===
After going undrafted in the 2019 NFL draft, Webster was signed by the Los Angeles Rams as a free agent on April 27 and made the team's initial 53-man roster. However, Webster was not active for any of the Rams' first five games. Webster was then waived on October 12, but then re-signed to the team's practice squad on October 14. He was promoted to the active roster on November 16, 2019. He was waived on July 20, 2021.

=== San Francisco 49ers ===
On July 21, 2021, Webster was claimed off waivers by the San Francisco 49ers. He was waived on August 31, 2021.

=== Chicago Bears ===
On September 1, 2021, Webster was claimed off waivers by the Chicago Bears. He was waived on October 5, 2021, and re-signed to the practice squad. He signed a reserve/future contract with the Bears on January 11, 2022.

On August 30, 2022, Webster was waived by the Bears and signed to the practice squad the next day. He appeared in two games for the Bears, where he caught two passes for 14 yards. Webster signed a reserve/future contract on January 9, 2023.

On August 29, 2023, Webster was released by the Chicago Bears and re-signed to the practice squad. He signed a reserve/future contract on January 8, 2024. He was placed on injured reserve on August 24.

== Personal life ==
Webster is of DR Congolese descent through his mother. His twin brother Nzuzi also played football professionally.
