= John Johnson (safety) =

American football player (born 1995)

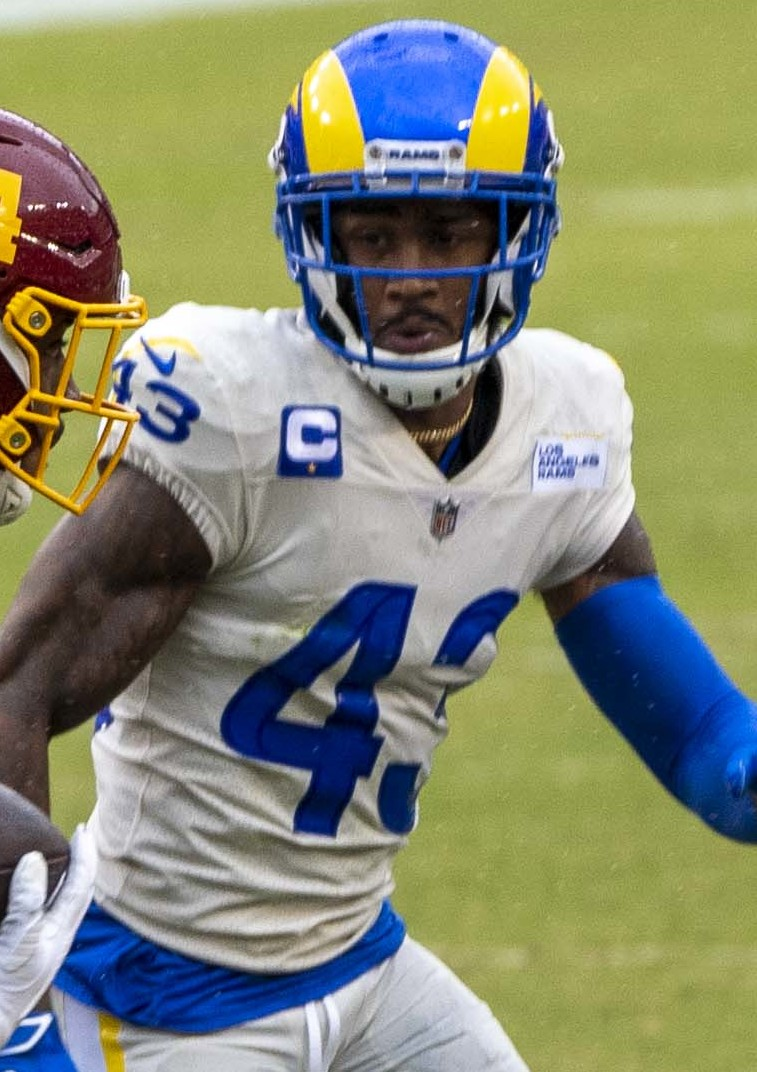
- Johnson III with the Los Angeles Rams in 2020

Profile
- Position: Safety

Personal information
- Born: December 19, 1995 (age 30); Hyattsville, Maryland, U.S.
- Listed height: 6 ft 0 in (1.83 m)
- Listed weight: 204 lb (93 kg)

Career information
- High school: Northwestern (Hyattsville)
- College: Boston College (2013–2016)
- NFL draft: 2017: 3rd round, 91st overall pick

Career history
- Los Angeles Rams (2017–2020); Cleveland Browns (2021–2022); Los Angeles Rams (2023–2024)

Career NFL statistics
- Total tackles: 562
- Sacks: 1
- Forced fumbles: 4
- Fumble recoveries: 2
- Pass deflections: 48
- Interceptions: 15
- Stats at Pro Football Reference

John Johnson III (born December 19, 1995) is an American professional football player. A safety, he played college football for the Boston College Eagles, and was selected by the Rams in the third round of the 2017 NFL draft. He has also played for the Cleveland Browns.

== Early life ==
He attended Northwestern High School in Hyattsville, Maryland and played wide receiver and safety for head coach Brian Pierre. Johnson finished his senior year with 50 combined tackles, 13 pass deflections, six tackles for a loss, and five interceptions.

He was rated as a two-star recruit by 247sports and Rivals.com. Johnson received ten offers in total from Boston College, Lehigh, Bucknell, Buffalo, Duke, UMass, Missouri, Pittsburgh, Towson, and Ohio. On June 1, 2012, Johnson took his only college visit to Boston College and then attended a camp held by them in late June where he was said to be very impressive and one of the top performers. Boston College's special teams coordinator and defensive line coach Al Washington recruited him to join their football team. On July 23, 2012, he officially committed to play for Boston College and cited academics as the main reason on why he chose to attend BC.

== College career ==
In 2013, Johnson began attending Boston College. He made his collegiate debut in the Eagles' season-opening 24–14 victory over the FCS' #5 Villanova Wildcats. On November 16, 2013, he recorded three solo tackles and made one tackle for a loss in a 38–21 victory over NC State. On December 31, 2013, Johnson made his first career fumble recovery during a 19–42 loss to Arizona in the 2013 AdvoCare V100 Bowl. He played cornerback and on special teams as a freshman and finished his season with four combined tackles, a tackle for a loss, and a fumble recovery in 12 games.

== Professional career ==
=== Pre-draft ===
On January 28, 2017, Johnson accepted an invitation to the Senior Bowl and played for the North who lost 15–16 to the South. He had an impressive week at practice leading up to the Senior Bowl and had a meeting with the Indianapolis Colts. Johnson attended the NFL Combine and completed all of the required combine and positional drills. On March 14, 2017, he participated at Boston College's pro day and chose to attempt the broad jump and run positional drills. Among 20 NFL teams had team representatives and scouts attend, that included defensive backs coaches from the New York Jets and Detroit Lions, to scout Johnson, Matt Millano, Patrick Towles, and three other teammates. He was ranked as the seventh best free safety prospect in the draft by DraftScout.com.

External videos
- John Johnson's NFL Combine Workout

Pre-draft measurables
Height	Weight	Arm length	Hand span	40-yard dash	10-yard split	20-yard split	20-yard shuttle	Three-cone drill	Vertical jump	Broad jump	Bench press
6 ft 0 1/2 in (1.84 m)	208 lb (94 kg)	32 in (0.81 m)	9 7/8 in (0.25 m)	4.61 s	1.55 s	2.66 s	4.18 s	6.72 s	37 in (0.94 m)	10 ft 0 in (3.05 m)	14 reps
All values from NFL Combine/Pro Day

=== Los Angeles Rams (first stint) ===
==== 2017 ====
The Los Angeles Rams selected Johnson III in the third round (91st overall) of the 2017 NFL draft. He was the 10th safety drafted. On June 9, 2017, the Rams signed Johnson to a four–year, $3.25 million rookie contract that included an initial signing bonus of $757,752.

External videos
- Rams draft John Johnson 91st overall
- NFL Draft Profile: John Johnson III

Throughout training camp, Johnson competed against Lamarcus Joyner, Maurice Alexander, Isaiah Johnson, Blake Countess, and Cody Davis to earn the role at starting strong safety following the departure of T. J. McDonald. Head coach Sean McVay named Johnson as a backup safety to start the season and listed him as the third strong safety on the depth chart. Maurice Alexander and Lamarcus Joyner were selected as the starting safeties with Blake Countess and Cody Davis listed as their primary backups.

On September 10, 2017, Johnson made his professional regular season debut in the Rams' home-opener against the Indianapolis Colts and made one solo tackle during the 46–9 victory. On October 8, 2017, Johnson earned his first career start supplanting Maurice Alexander as the starting strong safety after poor play and recorded three combined tackles (two solo), made two pass deflections, and made the first interception of his career on a pass by Russell Wilson to tight end Luke Willson during a 10–16 loss to the Seattle Seahawks. The following day, the Rams released Maurice Alexander and named Johnson the starting strong safety moving forward. On December 10, 2017, he collected a season-high 11 combined tackles (seven solo) and made two pass deflections during a 43–35 loss to the Philadelphia Eagles in Week 14. He finished his rookie season with 75 combined tackles (56 solo), 11 pass deflections, and an interception in 16 games and 11 starts. He received an overall grade of 85.8 from Pro Football Focus, which ranked 15th among all qualifying safeties in 2017.

The Los Angeles Rams finished the 2017 NFL season atop the NFC West with an 11–5 record, clinching a playoff berth. On January 6, 2018, Johnson started in his first career playoff appearance and made six combined tackles (four solo) in the Rams' 26–13 loss to the Atlanta Falcons during the National Football Conference (NFC) Wildcard Game.

==== 2018 ====
He entered training camp slated as the starting strong safety under defensive coordinator Wade Phillips. He began the season as the starting strong safety and was paired with free safety Lamarcus Joyner.

On September 10, 2018, Johnson started in the Los Angeles Rams' season-opener at the Oakland Raiders and recorded nine combined tackles (six solo), made a season-high two pass deflections, and intercepted a pass by Derek Carr to tight end Jared Cook during a 33–13 victory on Monday Night Football. In Week 6, he made four combined tackles (two solo), a pass deflection, and intercepted a pass thrown by Case Keenum to tight end Brian Parker during a 23–20 win at the Denver Broncos. The following week, Johnson produced two solo tackles, broke up a pass, and had his second consecutive game with an interception on a pass attempt by C. J. Beathard to George Kittle as the Rams won 39–10 at the San Francisco 49ers in Week 7. The Rams won eight consecutive games to begin the season. In Week 14, Johnson had six combined tackles (five solo), broke up a pass, and set a career-high with his fourth interception of the season on a pass thrown by Mitchell Trubisky to tight end Trey Burton in the Rams' 15–6 loss at the Chicago Bears. The following week, he collected a career-high 14 combined tackles (ten solo) and made a pass deflection during a 23–30 loss to the Philadelphia Eagles. He started in all 16 games and had a total of 119 combined tackles (82 solo), 11 pass deflections, a career-high four interceptions, and a forced fumble.

The Los Angeles Rams finished the 2018 NFL season first in the NFC West with a 13–3 record and clinched a first-round bye. On January 12, 2019, Johnson recorded seven combined tackles (four solo) during a 30–22 win against the Dallas Cowboys in the Divisional Round. On January 20, 2019, he had four combined tackles (three solo), broke up a pass, and a key interception during overtime on a pass thrown by Drew Brees to wide receiver Tre'Quan Smith to lead the Rams to a 26–23 victory at the New Orleans Saints in the NFC Championship Game, advancing them to the Super Bowl. On February 3, 2019, Johnson started in Super Bowl LIII against the New England Patriots and made seven combined tackles (four solo) as the Rams lost 13–3.

==== 2019 ====
He entered training camp slated as a starting safety. Head coach Sean McVay named Johnson the starting strong safety to begin the season and paired him with free safety Eric Weddle.

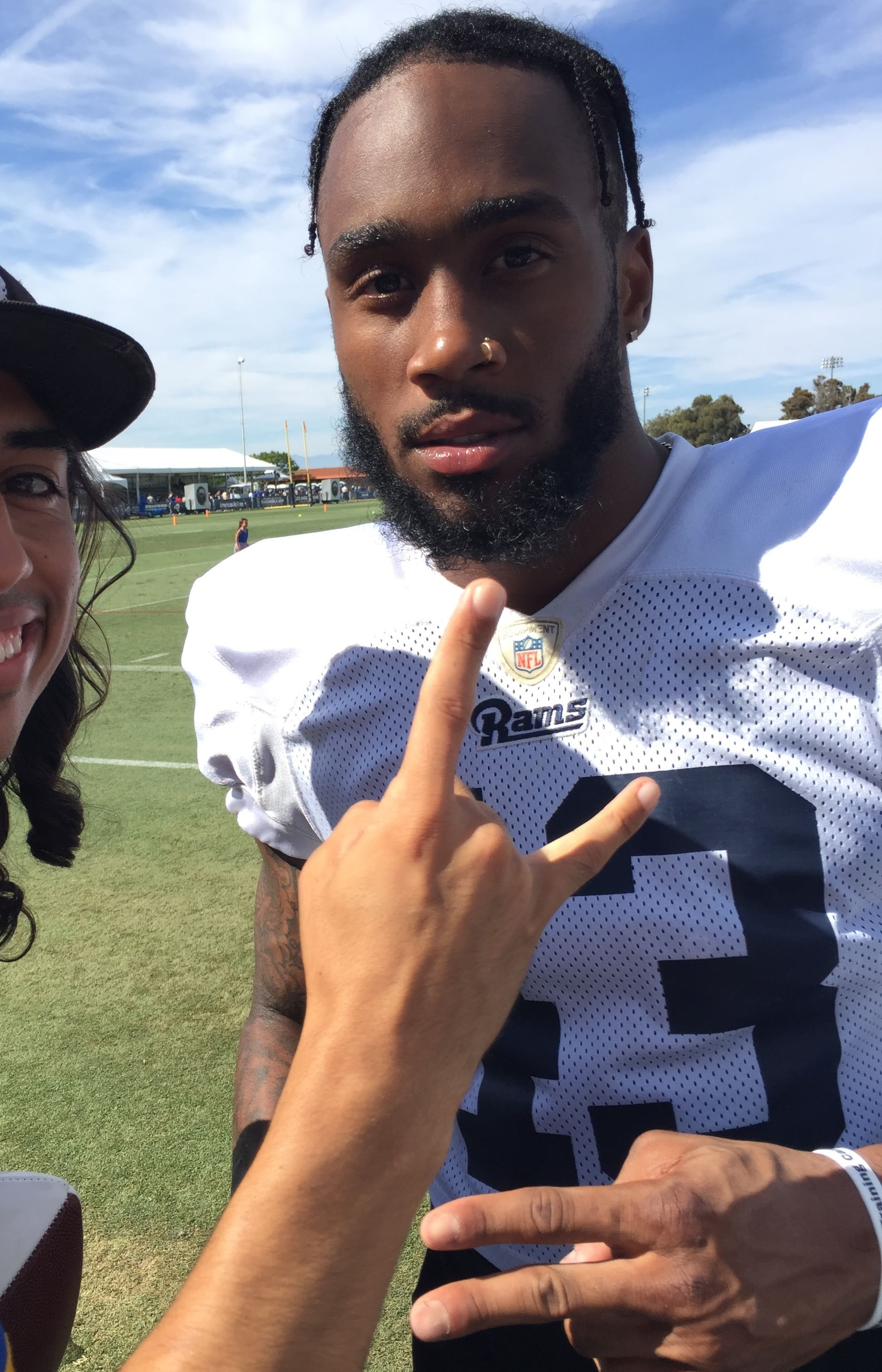
Johnson at Rams' training camp on August 3, 2019

On September 8, 2019, Johnson started in the Rams' season-opener at the Carolina Panthers and recorded a season-high 11 combined tackles (six solo) during a 30–27 victory. In Week 2, Johnson recorded six combined tackles (four solo), broke up a pass, and had his first interception of the season on a pass by Drew Brees to tight end Jared Cook as the Rams routed the New Orleans Saints 27–9. The following week, Johnson made nine combined tackles (two solo), a pass deflection, and intercepted a pass by Baker Mayfield to wide receiver Damion Ratley in the end zone late in the fourth quarter, to secure a 20–13 win at the Cleveland Browns. On October 13, 2019, Johnson recorded nine combined tackles (four solo) before injuring his shoulder while attempting to tackle running back Tevin Coleman during a two-yard rushing touchdown and exited in the first quarter as the Rams lost 7–20 against the San Francisco 49ers. On October 16, 2019, the Rams officially placed Johnson on injured reserve due to a shoulder injury. He remained inactive for the last ten games (Weeks 8–18) of the season. He finished the 2019 NFL season with 51 combined tackles (24 solo), two pass deflections, and two interceptions in six games and five starts.

==== 2020 ====
On January 16, 2020, the Rams announced their decision to hire former Denver Broncos' linebackers coach Brandon Staley as their new defensive coordinator, following the retirement of Wade Phillips. He entered training camp as the de facto starting strong safety. Head coach Sean McVay named Johnson the starting strong safety to begin the season and paired him with Jordan Fuller due to an injury to Taylor Rapp and Eric Weddle opting out of the season due to COVID-19.

In Week 3, Johnson recorded eight combined tackles (six solo), broke up a pass, and made his only interception of the season with the Rams down 28–3 in the third quarter. He was credited with an interception on a pass thrown by Josh Allen to tight end Tyler Kroft as both players both simultaneously came down maintaining possession of the ball, but the Rams would go on to still lose 32–35 at the Buffalo Bills. On October 18, 2020, Johnson collected a season-high 13 combined tackles (five solo) as the Rams lost 16–24 at the San Francisco 49ers. He started in all 16 games in 2020 and finished with 105 combined tackles (71 solo), eight pass deflections, and one interception. He received an overall grade of 85.6 from Pro Football Focus in 2020.

The Los Angeles Rams finished the 2020 NFL season in second place in the NFC South with a 10–6 record, earning a Wildcard berth. In the Wildcard Game, he made three solo tackles and a pass deflection during a 30–20 victory at the Seattle Seahawks. On January 16, 2021, Johnson produced nine combined tackles (eight solo) and made a pass deflection as the Rams lost 18–32 at the Green Bay Packers during the Divisional Round.

==== 2021 ====
He became an unrestricted free agent following the 2020 NFL season. Coming off an impressive performance, Johnson was one of the top free agents and reportedly received interest from the Philadelphia Eagles, Jacksonville Jaguars, and the Cleveland Browns. CBS Sports Jonathan Jones reported that Johnson was in negotiations with the Detroit Lions.

=== Cleveland Browns ===
==== 2021 ====
On March 15, 2021, the Cleveland Browns signed Johnson to a three–year, $33.75 million contract as an unrestricted free agent, which included $24 million guaranteed, $13.25 million guaranteed upon signing, and also had an initial signing bonus of $12 million.

During training camp, Johnson competed to be a starting safety against Ronnie Harrison and Grant Delpit following the departures of Andrew Sendejo and Karl Joseph. Head coach Kevin Stefanski chose Johnson to begin the season at starting strong safety and paired him with Ronnie Harrison.

On September 12, 2021, Johnson made his Cleveland Browns' debut in their season-opener at the Kansas City Chiefs and made five combined tackles (four solo) and one pass deflection in their 29–33 loss. In Week 9, he recorded three solo tackles, broke up a pass, and made his first interception with the Browns during a pass thrown by Joe Burrow to wide receiver Ja'Marr Chase in the Browns' 41–16 victory at the Cincinnati Bengals. On November 28, 2021, Johnson had six combined tackles (four solo), a pass deflection, and intercepted a pass by Lamar Jackson to tight end Mark Andrews during a 10–16 loss at the Baltimore Ravens. The following game, Johnson collected a season-high seven combined tackles (six solo) as the Browns defeated the Baltimore Ravens 24–32. He was inactive for two games (Weeks 16–17) after injuring his hamstring. He finished the season with 61 combined tackles (41 solo), five pass deflections, three interceptions, and a forced fumble in 15 games and 15 starts.

==== 2022 ====
In 14 starts in 2022, Johnson had 81 total tackles (58 unassisted) and an interception with two forced fumbles and two fumble recoveries.

==== 2023 ====
On March 15, 2023, the Browns officially released Johnson as a designated Post June 1 release.

=== Los Angeles Rams (second stint) ===
==== 2023 ====
On August 7, 2023, the Los Angeles Rams signed Johnson to a one–year, $1.08 million contract, the veteran minimum. On December 3, he recorded his first interception back with the Rams against his former team, the Cleveland Browns in a 36-19 L.A. victory. Johnson started the last seven games of the regular season and the Rams' 24-23 loss to Detroit in an NFC Wild Card game.

==== 2024 ====
On July 11, 2024, the Los Angeles Rams re-signed Johnson to a one–year, $1.37 million contract extension that includes $750,000 guaranteed and an initial signing bonus of $135,000.

After making his first start of the season in Week 2 against the Arizona Cardinals, on September 15, Johnson announced on Twitter that he suffered a hairline fracture in his scapula. This injury forced him to be placed on injured reserve for the remainder of the regular season, though he was activated for and played briefly in the Rams' 27-9 wild card victory over the Minnesota Vikings.

Johnson became a free agent following the 2024 season. On August 27, 2025, Johnson was suspended for three games by the NFL due to an undisclosed reason.

== NFL career statistics ==
Year	Team	Games		Tackles				Interceptions						Fumbles	
Year	Team	GP	GS	Comb	Solo	Ast	Sack	PD	Int	Yds	Avg	Lng	TD	FF	FR
2017	LAR	16	11	75	56	19	0.0	11	1	69	69.0	69	0	0	0
2018	LAR	16	16	119	82	37	0.0	11	4	46	11.5	35	0	1	0
2019	LAR	6	5	51	24	27	0.0	2	2	0	0.0	0	0	0	0
2020	LAR	16	16	105	73	32	0.0	8	1	0	0.0	0	0	0	0
2021	CLE	15	15	61	37	24	0.5	5	3	31	10.3	31	0	1	0
2022	CLE	17	17	101	31	31	0.5	4	1	0	0.0	0	0	2	2
2023	LAR	11	6	42	24	18	0.0	6	2	44	22.0	42	0	0	0
2024	LAR	2	1	8	4	4	0.0	1	1	0	0.0	0	0	0	0
Total		105	89	562	370	192	1.0	48	15	190	28.2	69	0	4	2
