= 2016 Los Angeles Rams season =

80th season in franchise history, first in Los Angeles since 1994

- Owner: Stan Kroenke
- General manager: Les Snead
- Head coach: Jeff Fisher (fired on December 12, 4–9 record); John Fassel (interim, 0–3 record)
- Home stadium: Los Angeles Memorial Coliseum

Results
- Record: 4–12
- Division place: 3rd NFC West
- Playoffs: Did not qualify
- All-Pros: 3: DT Aaron Donald (1st team); P Johnny Hekker (1st team); LB Alec Ogletree (2nd team)
- Pro Bowlers: 3: DT Aaron Donald; P Johnny Hekker; LS Jake McQuaide

Uniform
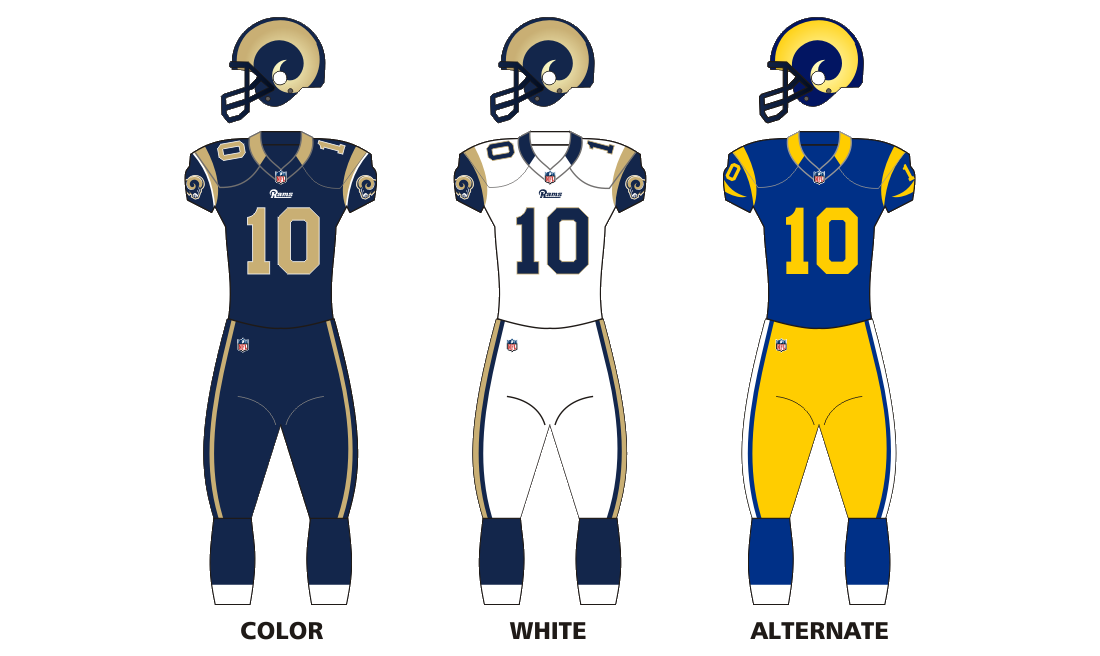

The 2016 season was the Los Angeles Rams' 79th in the National Football League (NFL), and their fifth and final under head coach Jeff Fisher. It was the franchise's 50th season in the Greater Los Angeles Area but their first since 1994, having returned to Los Angeles after 21 seasons in St. Louis. The Rams decided from 2016 to 2019 to return to wearing white uniforms at home in Los Angeles as a nod to the Fearsome Foursome era. In Week 15 against the Seattle Seahawks, their NFC West divisional rival, the Rams wore white horns on their helmet just for the one game only, a move which would be repeated for the entire following season.

The 2016 season saw the Rams attempting to improve upon their 7–9 record from 2015. After a surprising 3–1 start, the Rams would massively struggle in the second half, going 1–11 in their final 12 games, en route to a 4–12 record. The Rams also went 1–7 at home in 2016, their worst home record since going 0–8 at home in their 1–15 2009 season. The Rams also missed the playoffs for the 12th straight season. The franchise also clinched its tenth straight losing season. The Rams were also the only team to lose to the San Francisco 49ers in 2016, as both wins for the 49ers were against the Rams.

On December 12, 2016, Fisher was fired after a 42–14 loss to the Atlanta Falcons that dropped the Rams to 4–9. Special teams coordinator John Fassel was named interim head coach and went winless over the final three games. This was the last season with the Rams having a losing record until their injury plagued 2022 campaign.

Because the Oakland Raiders went 12–4, their first winning season in 14 years, the Rams were the only team from 2004 to this year that did not have a single winning season.

== Return to Los Angeles ==
After receiving permission to void its lease on the Edward Jones Dome in St. Louis during the 2015 season, the team officially filed an application to relocate back to Los Angeles on January 4, 2016, where it would play at the SoFi Stadium in Inglewood when completed; construction began in December 2015, and the stadium opened in September 2020. In the interim, the Rams would play seven of their home games at the Los Angeles Memorial Coliseum, and the eighth game at Twickenham Stadium in London as part of the NFL International Series. The Rams also resumed holding training camp at UC Irvine, where they had previously held training camp during the 1990s prior to the move to St. Louis.

The Rams competed against the San Diego Chargers and Oakland Raiders, both of whom also filed relocation requests for a joint stadium in Carson for the rights to the Los Angeles market; the Chargers received a one-year option to decide if they wanted to share the Inglewood stadium with the Rams, which they did in the following season in 2017. Had the Chargers not accepted the option, a one-year option would have been granted to the Raiders after theirs expired. The Raiders would eventually move to Las Vegas, Nevada in 2020 to play at Allegiant Stadium. The league made their decision in a special meeting on January 12; after two ballots, the Rams' proposal was accepted on a 30–2 vote.

The Rams' return to the Greater Los Angeles Area received extensive media coverage. The team made its first appearance on HBO's Hard Knocks, which covered training camp and preseason. Several players and their families were followed on the new E! reality series Hollywood & Football as they settled in Southern California, while the regular season was later chronicled in the Amazon Prime sports documentary series All Or Nothing.

The Coliseum was previously the Rams' home for 34 seasons (1946–1979); they moved to Anaheim Stadium in Orange County in 1980, and played there for fifteen seasons before the move to St. Louis in 1995.

== Draft ==
2016 Los Angeles Rams draft
Round	Pick	Player	Position	College	Notes
1	1	Jared Goff *	QB	California	
4	110	Tyler Higbee	TE	Western Kentucky	
4	117	Pharoh Cooper *	WR	South Carolina	
6	190	Temarrick Hemingway	TE	South Carolina State	
6	193	Josh Forrest	MLB	Kentucky	
6	206	Mike Thomas	WR	Southern Miss	
Made roster † Pro Football Hall of Fame * Made at least one Pro Bowl during career

Notes

- The Rams acquired the No. 1 overall pick from the Tennessee Titans along with a 4th and 6th round selections in exchange for the Rams No. 15 overall pick, two-second-round picks, and a third-round pick in the 2016 draft. The Titans also received the Rams first and third-round picks in 2017.
- The Rams acquired an additional second-round selection as part of a trade that sent quarterback Sam Bradford to the Philadelphia Eagles. This selection along with their original second-round pick were traded for the number one overall selection of the 2016 draft.
- The Rams forfeited their fifth-round selection after selecting offensive tackle Isaiah Battle in the 2015 Supplemental draft.
- The Rams traded their seventh-round selection to the Houston Texans in exchange for quarterback Case Keenum.
- Jared Goff was the last player picked in the 1st round by the Rams until 2024.

== Staff ==
2016 Los Angeles Rams staff
Front office: Owner/chairman – Stan Kroenke; Executive vice president of football operations/coo – Kevin Demoff; General manager – Les Snead; Director of player personnel – Taylor Morton; Director of college scouting – Brad Holmes; Director of pro personnel – Ran Carthon; Director of player evaluation, research & analysis – J.W. Jordan; Assistant director of pro personnel – Ray Agnew; Senior assistant to general manager – James Gladstone; Head coaches: Head coach – Jeff Fisher (Fired Week 14); Interim head coach/special teams coordinator – John Fassel; Assistant head coach – Dave McGinnis; Assistant head coach/offensive coordinator – Rob Boras; Offensive coaches: Passing game coordinator/wide receivers – Mike Groh; Quarterbacks – Chris Weinke; Running backs – Skip Peete; Assistant wide receivers – Kenan Smith; Tight ends – John Lilly; Offensive line – Paul Boudreau; Assistant offensive line – Andy Dickerson; Offensive quality control – Barrett Trotter	Defensive coaches: Defensive coordinator – Gregg Williams; Senior defensive assistant – Chuck Cecil; Defensive line – Mike Waufle; Assistant defensive line – Clyde Simmons; Linebackers – Frank Bush; Secondary – Dennard Wilson; Secondary – Brandon Fisher; Defensive quality control – Jeff Imamura; Defensive assistant – Mike Singletary; Strength and conditioning: Head strength and conditioning – Rock Gullickson; Assistant strength and conditioning – J. Aggabao

== Final roster ==
2016 Los Angeles Rams roster
Quarterbacks (QB): 16 Jared Goff; 17 Case Keenum; 14 Sean Mannion; Running backs (RB): 39 Malcolm Brown; 36 Aaron Green; 30 Todd Gurley; 34 Chase Reynolds; Wide receivers (WR): 11 Tavon Austin; 18 Kenny Britt; 10 Pharoh Cooper; 19 Paul McRoberts; 83 Brian Quick; 13 Mike Thomas; Tight ends (TE): 84 Temarrick Hemingway; 89 Tyler Higbee; 88 Lance Kendricks	Offensive linemen (OL): 66 David Arkin G; 61 Tim Barnes C; 68 Jamon Brown T/G; 64 Andrew Donnal G; 79 Rob Havenstein T; 72 Pace Murphy T; 65 Demetrius Rhaney C; 73 Greg Robinson T; 76 Rodger Saffold G; 69 Cody Wichmann G; Defensive linemen (DL): 90 Michael Brockers DT; 99 Aaron Donald DT; 91 Dominique Easley DT; 70 Morgan Fox DE; 95 William Hayes DE; 96 Matt Longacre DE; 97 Eugene Sims DE; 92 Cam Thomas DT; 93 Ethan Westbrooks DE	Linebackers (LB): 26 Mark Barron OLB; 55 Nicholas Grigsby MLB; 54 Bryce Hager OLB; 58 Cory Littleton OLB; 52 Alec Ogletree MLB; Defensive backs (DB): 31 Maurice Alexander FS; 24 Blake Countess CB; 38 Cody Davis FS; 33 E. J. Gaines CB; 32 Troy Hill CB; 27 Isaiah Johnson SS; 22 Trumaine Johnson CB; 35 Mike Jordan CB; 20 Lamarcus Joyner CB; 25 T. J. McDonald SS; Special teams (ST): 6 Johnny Hekker P; 44 Jake McQuaide LS; 4 Greg Zuerlein K	Practice squad: 77 Isaiah Battle T; 42 Jerome Couplin SS; 98 Lenny Jones DE; 57 Cassanova McKinzy OLB; 56 Reggie Northrup OLB; 47 Kevin Peterson CB; 82 Brandon Shippen WR; 37 Kevin Short CB; 48 Brandon Wegher RB; 81 Bryce Williams TE; Reserve: 12 Stedman Bailey WR (NF-Inj.); 41 Marqui Christian SS (IR); 23 Benny Cunningham RB (IR); 59 Josh Forrest OLB (IR); 46 Cory Harkey TE (IR); 45 Zach Laskey FB (IR); 15 Bradley Marquez WR (IR); 3 Marquez North WR (IR); 94 Robert Quinn DE (IR); 43 Brian Randolph SS (IR); 86 Nelson Spruce WR (IR); 62 Louis Trinca-Pasat DT (IR); -- Trey Watts RB (Susp.); 63 Darrell Williams T (IR); Rookies in italics 53 active, 12 reserve, 10 practice squad

== Preseason ==
Week	Date	Opponent	Result	Record	Venue	Recap
1	August 13	Dallas Cowboys	W 28–24	1–0	Los Angeles Memorial Coliseum	Recap
2	August 20	Kansas City Chiefs	W 21–20	2–0	Los Angeles Memorial Coliseum	Recap
3	August 27	at Denver Broncos	L 9–17	2–1	Sports Authority Field at Mile High	Recap
4	September 1	at Minnesota Vikings	L 25–27	2–2	U.S. Bank Stadium	Recap

== Regular season ==
=== Schedule ===
On November 25, 2015, the NFL announced that the Rams would play host to a then-undetermined NFC East opponent in the International Series, in the first-ever game at Twickenham Stadium in London, United Kingdom. On January 3, 2016, the New York Giants were confirmed as the Rams' opponent for this game, both teams having finished in third place in their respective divisions in the 2015 season. The game was played in Week 7 on Sunday, October 23. The kickoff time was announced on April 14, and both teams had their bye the following week. As a condition of the Rams' use of the Coliseum, the University of Southern California requested that the NFL not schedule any Monday night home games at the stadium, nor any home games on days after USC football games. While the team's final schedule did not contain any home Monday night games, two games were played on days following an USC home game. The Rams wore their white uniforms for all of their home games for the first time since 1971 as a nod to the Fearsome Foursome era, with the exception of wearing their throwback uniforms twice a year for home games and wearing their all-navy uniforms for the game in London.

Week	Date	Opponent	Result	Record	Venue	Attendance	Recap
1	September 12	at **San Francisco 49ers**	**L** 0–28	0–1	Levi's Stadium	70,178	Recap
2	September 18	**Seattle Seahawks**	**W** 9–3	1–1	Los Angeles Memorial Coliseum	91,046	Recap
3	September 25	at Tampa Bay Buccaneers	**W** 37–32	2–1	Raymond James Stadium	55,009	Recap
4	October 2	at **Arizona Cardinals**	**W** 17–13	3–1	University of Phoenix Stadium	64,622	Recap
5	October 9	Buffalo Bills	**L** 19–30	3–2	Los Angeles Memorial Coliseum	83,679	Recap
6	October 16	at Detroit Lions	**L** 28–31	3–3	Ford Field	56,018	Recap
7	October 23	New York Giants	**L** 10–17	3–4	(United Kingdom) Twickenham Stadium (London)	74,121	Recap
8	Bye						
9	November 6	Carolina Panthers	**L** 10–13	3–5	Los Angeles Memorial Coliseum	86,109	Recap
10	November 13	at New York Jets	**W** 9–6	4–5	MetLife Stadium	78,160	Recap
11	November 20	Miami Dolphins	**L** 10–14	4–6	Los Angeles Memorial Coliseum	83,483	Recap
12	November 27	at New Orleans Saints	**L** 21–49	4–7	Mercedes-Benz Superdome	73,067	Recap
13	December 4	at New England Patriots	**L** 10–26	4–8	Gillette Stadium	66,829	Recap
14	December 11	Atlanta Falcons	**L** 14–42	4–9	Los Angeles Memorial Coliseum	82,495	Recap
15	December 15	at **Seattle Seahawks**	**L** 3–24	4–10	CenturyLink Field	69,067	Recap
16	December 24	**San Francisco 49ers**	**L** 21–22	4–11	Los Angeles Memorial Coliseum	83,656	Recap
17	January 1	**Arizona Cardinals**	**L** 6–44	4–12	Los Angeles Memorial Coliseum	80,729	Recap

Note: Intra-division opponents are in bold text.

=== Game summaries ===
==== Week 1: at San Francisco 49ers ====
Week One: Los Angeles Rams at San Francisco 49ers – Game summary

Quarter	1	2	3	4	Total
Rams	0	0	0	0	**0**
**49ers**	7	7	0	14	**28**

at Levi's Stadium, Santa Clara, California

- Date: September 12
- Game time: 7:20 p.m. PDT
- Game weather: 66 °F (19 °C), clear
- Game attendance: 70,178
- Referee: Bill Vinovich
- TV announcers (ESPN): Chris Berman, Steve Young and Lindsay Czarniak
- Recap, Gamebook

Game information

**First quarter**

- SF – Carlos Hyde 11-yard run (Phil Dawson kick), 3:24. 49ers 7–0. **Drive: 10 plays, 52 yards, 3:18.**

**Second quarter**

- SF – Shaun Draughn 3-yard run (Phil Dawson kick), 8:16. 49ers 14–0. **Drive: 9 plays, 59 yards, 2:44.**

**Third quarter**

- No scoring plays

**Fourth quarter**

- SF – Vance McDonald 8-yard pass from Blaine Gabbert (Phil Dawson kick), 12:07. 49ers 21–0. **Drive: 10 plays, 77 yards, 3:55.**
- SF – Carlos Hyde 1-yard run (Phil Dawson kick), 5:14. 49ers 28–0. **Drive: 11 plays, 80 yards, 5:51.**

**Top passers**

- LA – Case Keenum – 17/35, 130 yards, 2 INT
- SF – Blaine Gabbert – 22/35, 170 yards, TD

**Top rushers**

- LA – Todd Gurley – 17 rushes, 47 yards
- SF – Carlos Hyde – 23 rushes, 88 yards, 2 TD

**Top receivers**

- LA – Kenny Britt – 4 receptions, 67 yards
- SF – Jeremy Kerley – 7 receptions, 61 yards

The now-Los Angeles Rams stumbled badly in their season opener, getting shut out by the host 49ers on Monday Night Football. Quarterback Case Keenum was ineffective, completing less than 50 percent of his passes (17-for-35) for 130 yards and two interceptions, while also being sacked twice. Running back Todd Gurley was also lackluster, with only 47 yards on 17 carries. Defensively, linebacker Alec Ogletree led the team with 12 tackles (11 solo) and defensive end Dominique Easley forced a fumble that was recovered by cornerback Trumaine Johnson. But the Rams came up with no sacks, and defensive tackle Aaron Donald was ejected from the game in the fourth quarter for unsportsmanlike conduct and making contact with a game official, an incident for which he later apologized.

==== Week 2: vs. Seattle Seahawks ====
Week Two: Seattle Seahawks at Los Angeles Rams – Game summary

Quarter	1	2	3	4	Total
Seahawks	0	3	0	0	**3**
**Rams**	3	3	0	3	**9**

at Los Angeles Memorial Coliseum, Los Angeles, California

- Date: September 18
- Game time: 1:05 pm. PDT
- Game weather: 88 °F (31 °C), sunny
- Game attendance: 91,046
- Referee: Jerome Boger
- TV announcers (Fox): Joe Buck (play-by-play), Troy Aikman (color commentator) and Erin Andrews (sideline reporter)
- Recap, Gamebook

Game information

**First quarter**

- LA – Greg Zuerlein 39-yard field goal, 10:38. Rams 3–0. **Drive: 9 plays, 54 yards, 4:22.**

**Second quarter**

- SEA – Steven Hauschka 23-yard field goal, 14:45. Tied 3–3. **Drive: 14 plays, 76 yards, 7:08.**
- LA – Greg Zuerlein 28-yard field goal, 1:04. Rams 6–3. **Drive: 9 plays, 70 yards, 3:15.**

**Third quarter**

- No scoring plays

**Fourth quarter**

- LA – Greg Zuerlein 47-yard field goal, 14:10. Rams 9–3. **Drive: 9 plays, 58 yards, 4:28.**

**Top passers**

- SEA – Russell Wilson – 22/35, 254 yards
- LA – Case Keenum – 18/30, 239 yards

**Top rushers**

- SEA – Christine Michael – 10 rushes, 60 yards
- LA – Todd Gurley – 19 rushes, 51 yards

**Top receivers**

- SEA – Tyler Lockett – 4 receptions, 99 yards
- LA – Kenny Britt – 6 receptions, 94 yards

Playing at home in the Los Angeles Memorial Coliseum for the first time since 1979, the Rams got the victory in a defensive battle over their NFC West rivals. Three field goals from kicker Greg Zuerlein were enough for the Rams, who played in front of a homecoming crowd of 91,046. With the win, the Rams won a regular season game in Los Angeles for the first time since 1994. Case Keenum completed 18 of 30 passes for 239 yards, and wide receiver Kenny Britt caught six passes for 94 yards. Robert Quinn and William Hayes both had sacks of Seahawks quarterback Russell Wilson, while Alec Ogletree had nine tackles and a fumble recovery on Seattle's final drive to preserve the victory. The Rams paid tribute to their first regular season game back in Los Angeles by wearing their blue and yellow throwback uniforms, which were their primary uniforms during their last season in 1994. It would also turn out to be the only game that the Rams won at home all season.

==== Week 3: at Tampa Bay Buccaneers ====
Week Three: Los Angeles Rams at Tampa Bay Buccaneers – Game summary

Quarter	1	2	3	4	Total
**Rams**	10	7	7	13	**37**
Buccaneers	6	14	0	12	**32**

at Raymond James Stadium, Tampa, Florida

- Date: September 24
- Game time: 4:05 p.m. EDT/1:05 pm. PDT
- Game weather: 91 °F (33 °C), cloudy
- Game attendance: 55,009
- Referee: Ed Hochuli
- TV announcers (Fox): Dick Stockton, Chris Spielman and Kristina Pink
- Recap, Gamebook

Game information

**First quarter**

- LA – Brian Quick 44-yard pass from Case Keenum (Greg Zuerlein kick), 12:05. Rams 7–0. **Drive: 8 plays, 75 yards, 3:02.**
- TB – Kwon Alexander 38-yard interception return (kick failed, wide left), 8:54. Rams 7–6.
- LA – Greg Zuerlein 53-yard field goal, 2:31. Rams 10–6. **Drive: 8 plays, 53 yards, 3:42.**

**Second quarter**

- TB – Charles Sims 1-yard run (Roberto Aguayo kick), 12:27. Buccaneers 13–10. **Drive: 9 plays, 75 yards, 5:03.**
- TB – Cameron Brate 3-yard pass from Jameis Winston (Roberto Aguayo kick), 6:10. Buccaneers 20–10. **Drive: 9 plays, 57 yards, 4:48.**
- LA – Todd Gurley 1-yard run (Greg Zuerlein kick), 0:28. Buccaneers 20–17. **Drive: 7 plays, 78 yards, 2:01.**

**Third quarter**

- LA – Todd Gurley 1-yard run (Greg Zuerlein kick), 0:53. Rams 24–20. **Drive 8 plays, 69 yards, 3:52.**

**Fourth quarter**

- LA – Ethan Westbrooks 77-yard fumble return (Greg Zuerlein kick), 11:56. Rams 31–20.
- TB – Cameron Brate 1-yard touchdown (pass failed), 9:00. Rams 31–26. **Drive: 7 plays, 75 yards, 2:44.**
- LA – Tavon Austin 43-yard pass from Case Keenum (run failed), 3:39. Rams 37–26. **Drive: 7 plays, 75 yards, 4:17.**
- TB – Mike Evans 7-yard pass from Jameis Winston (pass failed), 2:24. Rams 37–32. **Drive 11 plays, 75 yards, 2:23.**

**Top passers**

- LA – Case Keenum – 14/26, 190 yards, 2 TD, INT
- TB – Jameis Winston – 36/58, 405 yards, 3 TD, INT

**Top rushers**

- LA – Todd Gurley – 27 rushes, 87 yards, TD
- TB – Charles Sims – 13 rushes, 55 yards, TD

**Top receivers**

- LA – Tavon Austin – 5 receptions, 82 yards, TD
- TB – Mike Evans – 10 receptions, 132 yards, TD

Held out of the end zone in the season's first two weeks, the Rams scored five touchdowns in what would be their highest single-game point total of the season. Case Keenum's 44-yard scoring strike to wide receiver Brian Quick ended L.A.'s TD drought, and Greg Zuerlein kicked a 53-yard field goal to give the Rams a 10–6 lead at the end of the first quarter. After the host Buccaneers scored twice to take a 20–10 lead, Todd Gurley scored on a pair of 1-yard touchdown runs in both the second and third quarters to put the Rams back in the lead. Defensive end Ethan Westbrooks picked up a fumble forced by Robert Quinn and ran it back 77 yards for a touchdown, and Keenum connected with Tavon Austin for a 43-yard touchdown pass play and a 37–26 lead. But Tampa Bay rallied behind quarterback Jameis Winston (405 yards, 3 TD passes) to pull within five points. Driving in the final minute, the Bucs reached the Rams 5-yard line, but Quinn brought down Winston from behind as time expired. With two minutes remaining in the fourth quarter, game play was suspended for 69 minutes due to lightning strikes in the area. With the win, the Rams record improved to 2–1 for the first time since 2006, placing the team in first place in the NFC West. It was also the first time the Rams scored a regular season touchdown as the Los Angeles Rams since 1994. This was the only game all season that the Rams scored at least 30 points.

==== Week 4: at Arizona Cardinals ====
Week Four: Los Angeles Rams at Arizona Cardinals – Game summary

Quarter	1	2	3	4	Total
**Rams**	7	3	0	7	**17**
Cardinals	0	10	3	0	**13**

at University of Phoenix Stadium, Glendale, Arizona

- Date: October 2
- Game time: 1:25 pm. PDT
- Game weather: Played indoors (retractable roof closed)
- Game attendance: 64,622
- Referee: Gene Steratore
- TV announcers (Fox): Thom Brennaman, Charles Davis and Peter Schrager
- Recap, Gamebook

Game information

**First quarter**

- LA – Brian Quick 65-yard pass from Case Keenum (Greg Zuerlein kick), 1:59. Rams 7–0. **Drive: 7 plays, 90 yards, 3:28.**

**Second quarter**

- ARI – Chandler Catanzaro 25-yard field goal, 12:19. Rams 7–3. **Drive: 12 plays, 68 yards, 4:40.**
- LA – Greg Zuerlein 29-yard field goal, 8:42. Rams 10–3. **Drive: 8 plays, 64 yards, 3:37.**
- ARI – Michael Floyd 5-yard pass from Carson Palmer (Chandler Catanzaro kick), 0:24. Tied 10–10. **Drive: 8 plays, 80 yards, 1:24.**

**Third quarter**

- ARI – Chandler Catanzaro 21-yard field goal, 0:00. Cardinals 13–10. **Drive: 12 plays, 72 yards, 5:05.**

**Fourth quarter**

- LA – Brian Quick 4-yard pass from Case Keenum (Greg Zuerlein kick), 2:36. Rams 17–13. **Drive: 5 plays, 19 yards, 2:33.**

**Top passers**

- LA – Case Keenum – 18/30, 266 yards, 2 TD
- ARI – Carson Palmer – 23/36, 288 yards, TD, INT

**Top rushers**

- LA – Todd Gurley – 19 rushes, 33 yards
- ARI – David Johnson – 17 rushes, 83 yards

**Top receivers**

- LA – Kenny Britt – 4 receptions, 82 yards
- ARI – John Brown – 10 receptions, 144 yards

Case Keenum connected twice for touchdown passes to Brian Quick as Los Angeles held on for the victory, which gave the Rams a 3–1 start for the first time since 2006. Linebacker Mark Barron had a team-high eight tackles and an interception as the Rams defense forced five turnovers. Defensive tackle Aaron Donald was named NFC Defensive Player of the Week after recording five tackles with 1.5 sacks on the day as the Rams found themselves in first place in the NFC West.

==== Week 5: vs. Buffalo Bills ====
Week Five: Buffalo Bills at Los Angeles Rams – Game summary

Quarter	1	2	3	4	Total
**Bills**	7	9	7	7	**30**
Rams	3	10	3	3	**19**

at Los Angeles Memorial Coliseum, Los Angeles, California

- Date: October 9
- Game time: 1:25 pm. PDT
- Game weather: 91 °F (33 °C), sunny
- Game attendance: 83,679
- Referee: Walt Coleman
- TV announcers (CBS): Kevin Harlan, Rich Gannon and Scott Kaplan
- Recap, Gamebook

Game information

**First quarter**

- LA – Greg Zuerlein 37-yard field goal, 9:31. Rams 3–0. **Drive: 12 plays, 60 yards, 5:29.**
- BUF – Justin Hunter 4-yard pass from Tyrod Taylor (Dan Carpenter kick), 2:22. Bills 7–3. **Drive: 12 plays, 76 yards, 7:09.**

**Second quarter**

- BUF – Mike Gillislee 5-yard run (kick blocked), 13:59. Bills 13–3. **Drive: 2 plays, 63 yards, 1:01.**
- LA – Greg Zuerlein 32-yard field goal, 7:46. Bills 13–6. **Drive: 5 plays, 52 yards, 2:33.**
- LA – Todd Gurley 1-yard run (Greg Zuerlein kick), 1:56. Tied 13–13. **Drive: 8 plays, 64 yards, 4:39.**
- BUF – Dan Carpenter 23-yard field goal, 0:00. Bills 16–13. **Drive: 10 plays, 70 yards, 1:56.**

**Third quarter**

- LA – Greg Zuerlein 54-yard field goal, 8:05. Tied 16–16. **Drive: 9 plays, 48 yards, 5:13.**
- BUF – Nickell Robey-Coleman 41-yard interception return (Dan Carpenter kick), 3:54. Bills 23–16.

**Fourth quarter**

- LA – Greg Zuerlein 22-yard field goal, 5:51. Bills 23–19. **Drive: 13 plays, 89 yards, 8:16.**
- BUF – Marquise Goodwin 6-yard pass from Tyrod Taylor (Dan Carpenter kick), 2:37. Bills 30–19. **Drive: 3 plays, 25 yards, 1:04.**

**Top passers**

- BUF – Tyrod Taylor – 12/23, 124 yards, 2 TD
- LA – Case Keenum – 21/31, 271 yards, 2 INT

**Top rushers**

- BUF – LeSean McCoy – 18 rushes, 150 yards
- LA – Todd Gurley – 23 rushes, 72 yards, TD

**Top receivers**

- BUF – Charles Clay – 5 receptions, 73 yards
- LA – Kenny Britt – 5 receptions, 75 yards

Greg Zuerlein kicked four field goals, but the Rams were undone by numerous mistakes in a home loss to the Bills. Case Keenum passed for 271 yards, but was intercepted twice and sacked four times. Kenny Britt's five receptions for 75 yards led the Rams, while Todd Gurley ran for 72 yards and a touchdown, but also lost a fumble at the end of the first quarter that led to a Buffalo touchdown. Bills running back LeSean McCoy led his team to victory with 150 yards on 18 carries, while his backup Reggie Bush added one rushing attempt for three yards in his return to the Coliseum, where the Heisman Trophy winner had starred for the USC Trojans. Buffalo cornerback Nickell Robey-Coleman, who scored on a 41-yard interception return, would join the Rams the following season.

==== Week 6: at Detroit Lions ====
Week Six: Los Angeles Rams at Detroit Lions – Game summary

Quarter	1	2	3	4	Total
Rams	7	7	7	7	**28**
**Lions**	7	7	7	10	**31**

at Ford Field, Detroit, Michigan

- Date: October 16
- Game time: 1:00 pm. EDT/10:00 am. PDT
- Game weather: Played indoors (dome stadium)
- Game attendance: 56,018
- Referee: John Hussey
- TV announcers (Fox): Justin Kutcher, Charles Davis, Chris Spielman and Peter Schrager
- Recap, Gamebook

Game information

**First quarter**

- DET – Marvin Jones 7-yard pass from Matthew Stafford (Matt Prater kick), 10:44. Lions 7–0. **Drive: 8 plays, 75 yards, 4:16.**
- LA – Kenny Britt 20-yard pass from Case Keenum (Greg Zuerlein kick), 5:15. Tied 7–7. **Drive: 10 plays, 75 yards, 5:29.**

**Second quarter**

- LA – Case Keenum 1-yard run (Greg Zuerlein kick), 11:01. Rams 14–7. **Drive: 11 plays, 84 yards, 5:51.**
- DET – Andre Roberts 2-yard pass from Matthew Stafford (Matt Prater kick), 3:07. Tied 14–14. **Drive: 14 plays, 75 yards, 7:54.**

**Third quarter**

- DET – Anquan Boldin 4-yard pass from Matthew Stafford (Matt Prater kick), 9:50. Lions 21–14. **Drive: 5 plays, 60 yards, 2:17.**
- LA – Lance Kendricks 15-yard pass from Case Keenum (Greg Zuerlein kick), 6:33. Tied 21–21. **Drive: 6 plays, 75 yards, 3:17.**

**Fourth quarter**

- LA – Kenny Britt 9-yard pass from Case Keenum (Greg Zuerlein kick), 14:09. Rams 28–21. **Drive: 10 plays, 80 yards, 5:47.**
- DET – Golden Tate 23-yard pass from Matthew Stafford (Matt Prater kick), 6:02. Tied 28–28. **Drive: 13 plays, 84 yards, 8:07.**
- DET – Matt Prater 34-yard field goal, 1:29. Lions 31–28. **Drive: 9 plays, 44 yards, 3:37.**

**Top passers**

- LA – Case Keenum – 27/32, 321 yards, 3 TD, INT
- DET – Matthew Stafford – 22/31, 270 yards, 4 TD

**Top rushers**

- LA – Todd Gurley – 14 rushes, 58 yards
- DET – Zach Zenner – 14 rushes, 58 yards

**Top receivers**

- LA – Kenny Britt – 7 receptions, 136 yards, 2 TD
- DET – Golden Tate – 8 receptions, 165 yards, TD

Case Keenum passed for three touchdowns and ran for another, but an interception in the final minutes ruined a comeback attempt as the Rams fell to 3–3 with a loss to the host Lions. Keenum set a team record with 19 straight completions on 27-for-32 passing with 321 yards. Tied 14–14 with four seconds remaining in the first half, the Rams failed to take the lead as Todd Gurley (14 carries, 58 yards) was stopped short of the goal line as time ran out. Wide receiver Kenny Britt caught seven passes for 136 yards and two scores, all season highs. Safety Lamarcus Joyner had eight tackles to lead the Rams, while Aaron Donald had four tackles and a sack.

==== Week 7: vs. New York Giants ====
NFL International Series

Week Seven: New York Giants at Los Angeles Rams – Game summary

Quarter	1	2	3	4	Total
**Giants**	0	10	0	7	**17**
Rams	10	0	0	0	**10**

at Twickenham Stadium, London, United Kingdom

- Date: October 23
- Game time: 2:30 p.m. BST/6:30 am. PDT
- Game weather: 55 °F (13 °C), sunny intervals
- Game attendance: 74,121
- Referee: Ronald Torbert
- TV announcers (NFLN): Kevin Harlan, Dan Fouts and Stacey Dales
- Recap, Gamebook

Game information

**First quarter**

- LA – Tavon Austin 10-yard pass from Case Keenum (Greg Zuerlein kick), 11:15. Rams 7–0. **Drive: 7 plays, 35 yards, 3:10.**
- LA – Greg Zuerlein 36-yard field goal, 5:13. Rams 10–0. **Drive: 8 plays, 62 yards, 4:32.**

**Second quarter**

- NYG – Robbie Gould 29-yard field goal, 8:15. Rams 10–3. **Drive: 14 plays, 71 yards, 6:38.**
- NYG – Landon Collins 44-yard interception return (Robbie Gould kick), 7:10. Tied 10–10.

**Third quarter**

- No scoring plays

**Fourth quarter**

- NYG – Rashad Jennings 1-yard run (Robbie Gould kick), 9:23. Giants 17–10. **Drive: 6 plays, 35 yards, 2:43.**

**Top passers**

- NYG – Eli Manning – 24/37, 196 yards
- LA – Case Keenum – 32/53, 291 yards, TD, 4 INT

**Top rushers**

- NYG – Rashad Jennings – 13 rushes, 25 yards, TD
- LA – Todd Gurley – 15 rushes, 57 yards

**Top receivers**

- NYG – Victor Cruz – 5 receptions, 55 yards
- LA – Tavon Austin – 10 receptions, 57 yards, TD

After scoring 10 points on their first two drives, the Rams could not score again as they allowed 17 unanswered points in losing to the Giants in the first NFL International Series game hosted at London's Twickenham Stadium. Case Keenum passed for 291 yards and a touchdown, but also threw four interceptions in the game, the first of which was returned 44 yards for a touchdown by Giants safety Landon Collins, and the last coming with 50 seconds remaining in the game as Keenum tossed an errant pass that was picked off by New York cornerback Dominique Rodgers-Cromartie in the end zone. Tavon Austin had a career-high 10 receptions for 57 yards and a touchdown on offense. Linebacker Alec Ogletree and cornerback Troy Hill each had seven solo tackles to share the team lead for the defense, which got no sacks as the Rams dropped to a 3–4 record going into the bye week.

==== Week 9: vs. Carolina Panthers ====
Week Nine: Carolina Panthers at Los Angeles Rams – Game summary

Quarter	1	2	3	4	Total
**Panthers**	7	0	0	6	**13**
Rams	0	0	0	10	**10**

at Los Angeles Memorial Coliseum, Los Angeles, California

- Date: November 6
- Game time: 1:05 pm. PST
- Game weather: 75 °F (24 °C), sunny
- Game attendance: 86,109
- Referee: Terry McAulay
- TV announcers (Fox): Kevin Burkhardt, John Lynch and Pam Oliver
- Recap, Gamebook

Game information

**First quarter**

- CAR – Greg Olsen 9-yard pass from Cam Newton (Graham Gano kick), 3:44. Panthers 7–0. **Drive: 9 plays, 53 yards, 5:07.**

**Second quarter**

- No scoring plays

**Third quarter**

- No scoring plays

**Fourth quarter**

- CAR – Graham Gano 38-yard field goal, 11:12. Panthers 10–0. **Drive: 9 plays, 35 yards, 3:53.**
- LA – Greg Zuerlein 25-yard field goal, 8:01. Panthers 10–3. **Drive: 10 plays, 68 yards, 3:11.**
- CAR – Graham Gano 37-yard field goal, 3:18. Panthers 13–3. **Drive: 8 plays, 56 yards, 4:43.**
- LA – Kenny Britt 10-yard pass from Case Keenum (Greg Zuerlein kick), 0:34. Panthers 13–10. **Drive: 15 plays, 75 yards, 2:44.**

**Top passers**

- CAR – Cam Newton – 20/32, 225 yards, TD
- LA – Case Keenum – 27/46, 296 yards, TD, INT

**Top rushers**

- CAR – Jonathan Stewart – 15 rushes, 42 yards
- LA – Todd Gurley – 12 rushes, 48 yards

**Top receivers**

- CAR – Kelvin Benjamin – 5 receptions, 76 yards
- LA – Lance Kendricks – 7 receptions, 90 yards

Despite outgaining the visiting Panthers 339–244, the Rams continued to struggle in a defensive battle at the Coliseum. Linebacker Mark Barron had nine solo tackles and a sack as the Rams defense got to Carolina quarterback Cam Newton five times, with defensive tackle Aaron Donald collecting two sacks. Midway through the fourth quarter, Rams quarterback Case Keenum, who passed for 296 yards, drove his team to the Carolina 7-yard line, but his third down pass to tight end Lance Kendricks (team-high seven receptions, 90 yards) was dropped at the goal line, forcing the Rams to settle for a Greg Zuerlein field goal. In the final minutes, the Rams drove 75 yards in 15 plays when Keenum connected with wide receiver Kenny Britt for a 10-yard touchdown with 34 seconds remaining to close to within 13–10, but the Panthers recovered the onside kick and then ran out the clock.

==== Week 10: at New York Jets ====
Week Ten: Los Angeles Rams at New York Jets – Game summary

Quarter	1	2	3	4	Total
**Rams**	3	0	3	3	**9**
Jets	0	6	0	0	**6**

at MetLife Stadium, East Rutherford, New Jersey

- Date: November 13
- Game time: 1:00 pm. EST/10:00 am. PST
- Game weather: 62 °F (17 °C), sunny
- Game attendance: 78,160
- Referee: Ed Hochuli
- TV announcers (Fox): Thom Brennaman, Charles Davis and Peter Schrager
- Recap, Gamebook

Game information

**First quarter**

- LA – Greg Zuerlein 20-yard field goal, 9:37. Rams 3–0. **Drive: 12 plays, 73 yards, 5:23.**

**Second quarter**

- NYJ – Bilal Powell 4-yard pass play by Bryce Petty (kick failed, wide right), 12:35. Jets 6–3. **Drive: 9 plays, 99 yards, 4:06.**

**Third quarter**

- LA – Greg Zuerlein 38-yard field goal, 0:20. Tied 6–6. **Drive: 15 plays, 55 yards, 8:15.**

**Fourth quarter**

- LA – Greg Zuerlein 34-yard field goal, 6:52. Rams 9–6. **Drive: 10 plays, 36 yards, 4:00.**

**Top passers**

- LA – Case Keenum – 17/30, 165 yards
- NYJ – Bryce Petty – 19/32, 163 yards, TD, INT

**Top rushers**

- LA – Todd Gurley – 21 rushes, 64 yards
- NYJ – Matt Forte – 20 rushes, 98 yards

**Top receivers**

- LA – Kenny Britt – 7 receptions, 109 yards
- NYJ – Robby Anderson – 3 receptions, 69 yards

Despite another ugly offensive performance, the Rams relied on special teams and defense to grab what would turn out to be their last victory of the season. It was the second time in the 2016 season that the Rams won without scoring a touchdown. Kicker Greg Zuerlein accounted for all of the Rams' scoring with field goals of 20, 38, and 34 yards in the first, third, and fourth quarters, respectively. Early in the fourth quarter with the score tied and the Rams facing 4th-and-1 from their own 17, All-Pro punter Johnny Hekker boomed a career-long 78-yard punt that pinned the Jets inside the 20. Hekker, who averaged 51.7 yards on seven punts, was named NFC Special Teams Player of the Week for his pivotal role in changing the Rams' fortunes on the day. The Rams defense then forced the Jets to punt to near midfield, which set up what would ultimately be Zuerlein's game-winning score. Linebacker Alec Ogletree, who had a team-high nine tackles, picked off a Bryce Petty pass at the two-minute warning to preserve the win, as the Rams improved to 4–5 without scoring a touchdown. Wide receiver Kenny Britt had seven catches for 109 yards to lead the Rams on offense.

==== Week 11: vs. Miami Dolphins ====
Week Eleven: Miami Dolphins at Los Angeles Rams – Game summary

Quarter	1	2	3	4	Total
**Dolphins**	0	0	0	14	**14**
Rams	7	0	3	0	**10**

at Los Angeles Memorial Coliseum, Los Angeles, California

- Date: November 20
- Game time: 1:05 pm. PST
- Game weather: 63 °F (17 °C), rain
- Game attendance: 83,483
- Referee: Gene Steratore
- TV announcers (Fox): Chris Myers, Ronde Barber and Jennifer Hale
- Recap, Gamebook

Game information

**First quarter**

- LA – Todd Gurley 24-yard run (Greg Zuerlein kick), 9:47. Rams 7–0. **Drive: 4 plays, 68 yards, 1:55.**

**Second quarter**

- No scoring plays

**Third quarter**

- LA – Greg Zuerlein 46-yard field goal, 1:39. Rams 10–0. **Drive: 10 plays, 49 yards, 6:05.**

**Fourth quarter**

- MIA – Jarvis Landry 10-yard pass from Ryan Tannehill (Andrew Franks kick), 4:02. Rams 10–7. **Drive: 8 plays, 77 yards, 2:38.**
- MIA – DeVante Parker 9-yard pass from Ryan Tannehill (Andrew Franks kick), 0:36. Dolphins 14–10. **Drive: 7 plays, 75 yards, 1:35.**

**Top passers**

- MIA – Ryan Tannehill – 24/34, 172 yards, 2 TD, INT
- LA – Jared Goff – 17/31, 134 yards

**Top rushers**

- MIA – Jay Ajayi – 16 carries, 77 yards
- LA – Todd Gurley – 20 carries, 76 yards, TD

**Top receivers**

- MIA – DeVante Parker – 8 receptions, 79 yards, TD
- LA – Kenny Britt – 5 receptions, 43 yards

Rookie quarterback Jared Goff, the No. 1 overall pick in the 2016 NFL draft, made his first start for the Rams. After going three-and-out on his first series, Goff completed his first two passes to tight end Tyler Higbee (2 yards) and wide receiver Kenny Britt (19 yards) to set up a 25-yard touchdown run by running back Todd Gurley. The Rams took a 10–0 lead late in the third quarter on a 46-yard field goal by Greg Zuerlein. But Zeurlein just missed on a 48-yard attempt midway through the fourth quarter, which gave the Dolphins an opportunity to come back. Despite being sacked four times, Miami quarterback Ryan Tannehill threw touchdown passes to Jarvis Landry and DeVante Parker, the last coming with just 36 seconds remaining in the game to take the 14–10 win. Linebackers Mark Barron and Alec Ogletree each had 11 tackles, while defensive end Dominique Easley had two sacks. On offense, Goff completed 17 of 31 passes for 134 yards and was sacked once in his career and season debut.

==== Week 12: at New Orleans Saints ====
Week Twelve: Los Angeles Rams at New Orleans Saints – Game summary

Quarter	1	2	3	4	Total
Rams	7	14	0	0	**21**
**Saints**	7	21	14	7	**49**

at Mercedes-Benz Superdome, New Orleans, Louisiana

- Date: November 27
- Game time: 12:00 p.m. CST/10:00 am. PST
- Game weather: Played indoors (dome stadium)
- Game attendance: 73,067
- Referee: John Hussey
- TV announcers (Fox): Chris Myers, Ronde Barber and Jennifer Hale
- Recap, Gamebook

Game information

**First quarter**

- LA – Tavon Austin 24-yard pass from Jared Goff (Greg Zuerlein kick), 12:08. Rams 7–0. **Drive: 6 plays, 75 yards, 2:52.**
- NO – Brandon Coleman 3-yard pass from Drew Brees (Wil Lutz kick), 2:45. Tied 7–7. **Drive: 9 plays, 51 yards, 4:33.**

**Second quarter**

- LA – Kenny Britt 6-yard pass from Jared Goff (Greg Zuerlein kick), 14:43. Rams 14–7. **Drive: 1 play, 6 yards, 0:04.**
- NO – Mark Ingram II 10-yard run (Wil Lutz kick), 9:38. Tied 14–14. **Drive: 9 plays, 75 yards, 5:05.**
- NO – Drew Brees 1-yard run (Wil Lutz kick), 7:46. Saints 21–14. **Drive: 4 plays, 10 yards, 1:39.**
- NO – Michael Thomas 6-yard pass from Drew Brees (Wil Lutz kick), 2:24. Saints 28–14. **Drive: 8 plays, 78 yards, 3:45.**
- LA – Lance Kendricks 15-yard pass from Jared Goff (Greg Zuerlein kick), 0:55. Saints 28–21. **Drive: 8 plays, 79 yards, 1:29.**

**Third quarter**

- NO – Mark Ingram II 21-yard pass from Drew Brees (Wil Lutz kick), 12:58. Saints 35–21. **Drive: 4 plays, 75 yards, 2:02.**
- NO – Michael Thomas 21-yard pass from Drew Brees (Wil Lutz kick), 3:42. Saints 42–21. **Drive: 7 plays, 92 yards, 3:17.**

**Fourth quarter**

- NO – Tim Hightower 50-yard pass from Willie Snead IV (Wil Lutz kick), 10:15. Saints 49–21. **Drive: 7 plays, 81 yards, 4:45.**

**Top passers**

- LA – Jared Goff – 20/32, 214 yards, 3 TD, INT
- NO – Drew Brees – 28/36, 310 yards, 4 TD

**Top rushers**

- LA – Todd Gurley – 13 rushes, 50 yards
- NO – Mark Ingram II – 14 rushes, 146 yards, TD

**Top receivers**

- LA – Kenny Britt – 5 receptions, 52 yards, TD
- NO – Michael Thomas – 9 receptions, 108 yards, 2 TD

Jared Goff threw for three touchdowns in the first half for the first scoring passes of his career, but it was not enough as Drew Brees passed for four touchdowns and ran for another as the host Saints shredded the Rams defense, which gave up a season-high 555 yards. Goff drove the Rams 75 yards in six plays on the opening drive, capping it off with a 24-yard touchdown strike to Tavon Austin. Following a strip sack of Brees by Aaron Donald with a fumble recovery by Mark Barron at the beginning of the second quarter, Goff opened up the second quarter with a 6-yard touchdown pass to Kenny Britt. New Orleans then scored 21 unanswered points before the Rams responded with Goff connecting with Lance Kendricks from 15 yards out with 55 seconds remaining in the period to bring Los Angeles to within 28–21. But the Rams would get no closer, as the Saints scored three more touchdowns in a dominating second half. Goff completed 20 of 32 passes for 214 yards with three touchdowns and one interception, but was sacked three times and lost a fumble. Barron had a team-high 14 tackles (10 solo) to go along with his fumble recovery. Some would see the Saints running up the score as a measure of revenge against their former defensive coordinator Gregg Williams, the main responsible for Bountygate, who now held that position with the Rams.

==== Week 13: at New England Patriots ====
Week Thirteen: Los Angeles Rams at New England Patriots – Game summary

Quarter	1	2	3	4	Total
Rams	0	0	3	7	**10**
**Patriots**	7	10	6	3	**26**

at Gillette Stadium, Foxborough, Massachusetts

- Date: December 4
- Game time: 1:00 pm. EST/10:00 am. PST
- Game weather: 39 °F (4 °C), sunny and cool
- Game attendance: 66,829
- Referee: Jerome Boger
- TV announcers (Fox): Kevin Burkhardt, John Lynch and Pam Oliver
- Recap, Gamebook

Game information

**First quarter**

- NE – LeGarrette Blount 43-yard run (Stephen Gostkowski kick), 10:38. Patriots 7–0. **Drive: 8 plays, 80 yards, 4:22.**

**Second quarter**

- NE – Chris Hogan 14-yard pass from Tom Brady (Stephen Gostkowski kick), 13:04. Patriots 14–0. **Drive: 4 plays, 30 yards, 1:56.**
- NE – Stephen Gostkowski 28-yard field goal, 0:11. Patriots 17–0. **Drive: 13 plays, 48 yards, 5:19.**

**Third quarter**

- LA – Greg Zuerlein 44-yard field goal, 7:50. Patriots 17–3. **Drive: 8 plays, 29 yards, 4:55.**
- NE – Stephen Gostkowski 44-yard field goal, 5:08. Patriots 20–3. **Drive: 6 plays, 49 yards, 2:42.**
- NE – Stephen Gostkowski 48-yard field goal, 3:06. Patriots 23–3. **Drive: 6 plays, 13 yards, 1:56.**

**Fourth quarter**

- NE – Stephen Gostkowski 45-yard field goal, 10:48. Patriots 26–3. **Drive: 10 plays, 58 yards, 4:26.**
- LA – Kenny Britt 1-yard pass from Jared Goff (Greg Zuerlein kick), 1:15. Patriots 26–10. **Drive: 6 plays, 66 yards, 2:14.**

**Top passers**

- LA – Jared Goff – 14/32, 161 yards, TD, 2 INT
- NE – Tom Brady – 33/46, 269 yards, TD

**Top rushers**

- LA – Todd Gurley – 11 rushes, 39 yards
- NE – LeGarrette Blount – 18 rushes, 88 yards, TD

**Top receivers**

- LA – Kenny Britt – 2 receptions, 67 yards, TD
- NE – Julian Edelman – 8 receptions, 101 yards

The Rams offered little resistance on the road against the eventual Super Bowl champions, which held visiting Los Angeles to just 162 yards in total offense. Jared Goff completed 14 of 32 passes for 161 yards, was intercepted twice and sacked four times. Much of that yardage came after the two-minute warning in the fourth quarter, when Goff connected with Kenny Britt for a 66-yard pass play. Two plays later, Goff and Britt connected again for a 1-yard touchdown. Alec Ogletree had 14 tackles to lead the Rams defense. With the loss, the Rams fell to 4-8 and finished 1-3 against the AFC East.

==== Week 14: vs. Atlanta Falcons ====
Week Fourteen: Atlanta Falcons at Los Angeles Rams – Game summary

Quarter	1	2	3	4	Total
**Falcons**	7	14	21	0	**42**
Rams	0	0	0	14	**14**

at Los Angeles Memorial Coliseum, Los Angeles, California

- Date: December 11
- Game time: 1:25 pm. PST
- Game weather: 65 °F (18 °C), cloudy
- Game attendance: 82,495
- Referee: Clete Blakeman
- TV announcers (Fox): Dick Stockton, David Diehl and Kristina Pink
- Recap, Gamebook

Game information

**First quarter**

- ATL – Justin Hardy 3-yard pass from Matt Ryan (Matt Bryant kick), 14:50. Falcons 7–0. **Drive: 1 play, 3 yards, 0:10.**

**Second quarter**

- ATL – Tevin Coleman 6-yard pass from Matt Ryan (Matt Bryant kick), 14:53. Falcons 14–0. **Drive: 9 plays, 88 yards, 3:05.**
- ATL – Deion Jones 33-yard interception return (Matt Bryant kick), 8:54. Falcons 21–0.

**Third quarter**

- ATL – Taylor Gabriel 64-yard pass from Matt Ryan (Matt Bryant kick), 13:18. Falcons 28–0. **Drive: 3 plays, 75 yards, 1:42.**
- ATL – Tevin Coleman 6-yard run (Matt Bryant kick), 3:56. Falcons 35–0. **Drive: 8 plays, 54 yards, 4:29.**
- ATL – Vic Beasley 21-yard fumble return (Matt Bryant kick), 2:50. Falcons 42–0.

**Fourth quarter**

- LA – Todd Gurley 3-yard run (Greg Zuerlein kick), 14:57. Falcons 42–7. **Drive: 8 plays, 60 yards, 2:53.**
- LA – Jared Goff 2-yard run (Greg Zuerlein kick), 2:44. Falcons 42–14. **Drive: 13 plays, 80 yards, 4:59.**

**Top passers**

- ATL – Matt Ryan – 18/28, 237 yards, 3 TD
- LA – Jared Goff – 24/41, 235 yards, 2 INT

**Top rushers**

- ATL – Tevin Coleman – 8 rushes, 36 yards, TD
- LA – Todd Gurley – 16 rushes, 61 yards, TD

**Top receivers**

- ATL – Taylor Gabriel – 3 receptions, 82 yards, TD
- LA – Kenny Britt – 7 receptions, 82 yards

Returning home to the Coliseum, the Rams were in trouble from the start when L.A. return man Mike Thomas muffed the opening kickoff, which was recovered by the Falcons at the Rams 3-yard line. One play later, Atlanta quarterback Matt Ryan threw the first of three touchdown passes on the day with a 3-yard strike to wide receiver Justin Hardy as Atlanta, the eventual NFC Champion, romped to victory even without playing its top two wideouts Julio Jones and Mohamed Sanu, who were both sidelined with injuries. Ryan tossed his second touchdown to running back Tevin Coleman at the start of the second quarter. Meanwhile, Rams rookie quarterback Jared Goff struggled greatly, throwing two interceptions in the first half, the second of which was returned 33 yards for a touchdown by linebacker Deion Jones and a 21–0 Falcons lead. On Atlanta's first possession of the third period, Ryan found wide receiver Taylor Gabriel for a 64-yard touchdown pass play and Coleman added another score on a 6-yard TD run. The Falcons rout was completed on the Rams' next drive as defensive end Vic Beasley, who had three sacks of Goff, stripped the Rams QB of the ball and scooped it up himself for a 21-yard fumble recovery return touchdown. The Rams salvaged some dignity in the fourth quarter with short touchdown runs by Goff and Todd Gurley, but the outcome of the game had long been decided. After the game, Gurley lashed out at the team for running a "middle-school offense." The loss (in which Los Angeles was mathematically eliminated from postseason contention) was the 165th of Jeff Fisher's career, tying him with Dan Reeves for the most in NFL history. The game would turn to be the last for Fisher as the Rams' head coach, as he was fired the following day. Fisher ended his NFL coaching career with a record of 172–165–1. The Rams also finished 1-3 against the NFC South.

==== Week 15: at Seattle Seahawks ====
Week Fifteen: Los Angeles Rams at Seattle Seahawks – Game summary

Quarter	1	2	3	4	Total
Rams	0	3	0	0	**3**
**Seahawks**	0	10	7	7	**24**

at CenturyLink Field, Seattle, Washington

- Date: December 15
- Game time: 5:25 pm. PST
- Game weather: 36 °F (2 °C), partly cloudy
- Game attendance: 69,067
- Referee: Brad Allen
- TV announcers (NBC/NFLN/Twitter): Al Michaels, Cris Collinsworth, and Heather Cox
- Recap, Gamebook

Game information

**First quarter**

- No scoring plays

**Second quarter**

- SEA – Luke Willson 8-yard pass from Russell Wilson (Steven Hauschka kick), 12:21. Seahawks 7–0. **Drive: 13 plays, 93 yards, 6:47.**
- SEA – Steven Hauschka 48-yard field goal, 8:45. Seahawks 10–0. **Drive: 4 plays, 0 yards, 2:03.**
- LA – Greg Zuerlein 36-yard field goal, 0:55. Seahawks 10–3. **Drive: 8 plays, 51 yards, 3:39.**

**Third quarter**

- SEA – Doug Baldwin 1-yard pass from Russell Wilson (Steven Hauschka kick), 3:12. Seahawks 17–3. **Drive: 8 plays, 62 yards, 4:37.**

**Fourth quarter**

- SEA – Tyler Lockett 57-yard pass from Russell Wilson (Steven Hauschka kick), 14:49. Seahawks 24–3. **Drive: 5 plays, 67 yards, 1:43.**

**Top passers**

- LA – Jared Goff – 13/25, 135 yards
- SEA – Russell Wilson – 19/26, 229 yards, 3 TD, INT

**Top rushers**

- LA – Todd Gurley – 14 rushes, 38 yards
- SEA – Thomas Rawls – 21 rushes, 34 yards

**Top receivers**

- LA – Kenny Britt – 4 receptions, 50 yards
- SEA – Tyler Lockett – 7 receptions, 130 yards, TD

Just three days after being named interim head coach, John Fassel led the Rams into their final road game of the season. The Rams offense continued to sputter under the direction of offensive coordinator Rob Boras, with only a Greg Zuerlein field goal late in the second quarter averting a shutout. Jared Goff completed 13 of 25 passes for 135 yards and was sacked four times. Early in the fourth quarter, Goff led the Rams on their best drive of the game, going from their own 20 in 12 plays before taking off on a 15-yard run down to the Seattle 2-yard line, where he was knocked out of bounds and out of the game on a hard hit by Seahawks cornerback Richard Sherman. Case Keenum relieved Goff at quarterback, but was ineffective and the Rams were held without a touchdown for the fourth time in the season. Linebacker Mark Barron and cornerback Mike Jordan both had seven tackles to lead the Rams defense. As this was an NFL Color Rush game, the Rams played in the all-white uniforms that constituted their primary uniform for the season, but with all-white socks. Additionally, Los Angeles switched to gray facemasks and went with white horns on their blue helmets for the first time since the 1972 NFL season. With the loss, the Rams fell to 4-10 (2-2 against the NFC West) and finished 3-5 on the road.

==== Week 16: vs. San Francisco 49ers ====
Week Sixteen: San Francisco 49ers at Los Angeles Rams – Game summary

Quarter	1	2	3	4	Total
**49ers**	7	0	0	15	**22**
Rams	14	0	0	7	**21**

at Los Angeles Memorial Coliseum, Los Angeles, California

- Date: December 24
- Game time: 1:25 pm. PST
- Game weather: 59 °F (15 °C), partly cloudy
- Game attendance: 83,656
- Referee: Walt Anderson
- TV announcers (Fox): Chris Myers, Ronde Barber and Jennifer Hale
- Recap, Gamebook

Game information

**First quarter**

- SF – Carlos Hyde 19-yard pass from Colin Kaepernick (Phil Dawson kick), 9:01. 49ers 7–0. **Drive: 2 plays, 17 yards, 0:37.**
- LA – Todd Gurley 1-yard run (Greg Zuerlein kick), 4:07. Tied 7–7. **Drive: 9 plays, 52 yards, 4:54.**
- LA – Tavon Austin 30-yard run (Greg Zuerlein kick), 2:33. Rams 14–7. **Drive: 1 play, 30 yards, 0:08.**

**Second quarter**

- No scoring plays

**Third quarter**

- No scoring plays

**Fourth quarter**

- LA – Tyler Higbee 2-yard pass from Jared Goff (Greg Zuerlein kick), 10:32. Rams 21–7. **Drive: 4 plays, 25 yards, 2:13.**
- SF – Colin Kaepernick 13-yard run (Phil Dawson kick), 5:06. Rams 21–14. **Drive: 13 plays, 75 yards, 5:26.**
- SF – Rod Streater 10-yard pass from Colin Kaepernick (Colin Kaepernick run), 0:31. 49ers 22–21. **Drive: 10 plays, 73 yards, 2:39.**

**Top passers**

- SF – Colin Kaepernick – 28/38, 266 yards, 2 TD, INT
- LA – Jared Goff – 11/24, 90 yards, TD, 2 INT

**Top rushers**

- SF – Carlos Hyde – 13 rushes, 38 yards
- LA – Todd Gurley – 23 rushes, 67 yards, TD

**Top receivers**

- SF – Rod Streater – 6 receptions, 63 yards, TD
- LA – Lance Kendricks – 3 receptions, 36 yards

In a matchup of two of the NFL's worst teams, Los Angeles started fast but faded in the fourth quarter as the 49ers, who had shut out the Rams in Week 1, snapped their own 13-game losing streak with a victory in the final minute. Todd Gurley and Tavon Austin both scored on touchdown runs in the first quarter to give the Rams a 14–7 lead. Both teams held each other scoreless in the second and third periods, but it seemed that the Rams would outlast their rivals in the fourth when quarterback Jared Goff connected with fellow rookie tight end Tyler Higbee for a 2-yard touchdown with 10:38 remaining to build a 21–7 lead. But the 49ers rallied behind quarterback Colin Kaepernick (28–38, 266 yards), who led his team on a 14-play, 75-yard drive that ended with Kaepernick running it in from 13 yards out. Then after the Rams were held to a three-and-out, Kaepernick drove San Francisco 75 yards in 10 plays, firing a 10-yard touchdown pass to wide receiver Rod Streater with 36 seconds remaining. The 49ers then opted to go for the win, and Kaepernick successfully scrambled into the end zone to put his team on top 22–21, as the 49ers swept the season series (which would be their only two wins of the year) for the first time since 2013. Following the game, a solemn Goff took responsibility for the loss (which dropped the Rams to 4–11) and pledged during his postgame press conference, "I promise everyone out there, all of the Rams fans, that I’m going to do everything I can, everything in me, to make that happen and get this thing fixed."

==== Week 17: vs. Arizona Cardinals ====
Week Seventeen: Arizona Cardinals at Los Angeles Rams – Game summary

Quarter	1	2	3	4	Total
**Cardinals**	3	13	14	14	**44**
Rams	0	6	0	0	**6**

at Los Angeles Memorial Coliseum, Los Angeles, California

- Date: January 1, 2017
- Game time: 1:25 pm. PST
- Game weather: 59 °F (15 °C), sunny
- Game attendance: 80,729
- Referee: Craig Wrolstad
- TV announcers (Fox): Chris Myers, Ronde Barber and Jennifer Hale
- Recap, Gamebook

Game information

**First quarter**

- ARI – Chandler Catanzaro 32-yard field goal, 10:34. Cardinals 3–0. **Drive: 10 plays, 61 yards, 4:26.**

**Second quarter**

- ARI – Chandler Catanzaro 34-yard field goal, 12:25. Cardinals 6–0. **Drive: 6 plays, 19 yards, 2:07.**
- ARI – Jeremy Ross 4-yard pass from Carson Palmer (Chandler Catanzaro kick), 7:42. Cardinals 13–0. **Drive: 7 plays, 65 yards, 3:13.**
- LA – Greg Zuerlein 37-yard field goal, 2:34. Cardinals 13–3. **Drive: 9 plays, 56 yards, 5:08.**
- LA – Greg Zuerlein 36-yard field goal, 0:48. Cardinals 13–6. **Drive: 4 plays, 1 yard, 1:11.**
- ARI – Chandler Catanzaro 47-yard field goal, 0:00. Cardinals 16–6. **Drive: 7 plays, 46 yards, 0:48.**

**Third quarter**

- ARI – Darren Fells 37-yard pass from Carson Palmer (Chandler Catanzaro kick), 13:11. Cardinals 23–6. **Drive: 1 play, 37 yards, 0:09.**
- ARI – Kerwynn Williams 1-yard run (Chandler Catanzaro kick), 8:17. Cardinals 30–6. **Drive: 8 plays, 57 yards, 3:27.**

**Fourth quarter**

- ARI – Larry Fitzgerald 5-yard pass from Carson Palmer (Chandler Catanzaro kick), 11:35. Cardinals 37–6. **Drive: 6 plays, 19 yards, 1:48.**
- ARI – Justin Bethel 66-yard interception return (Chandler Catanzaro kick), 8:06. Cardinals 44–6.

**Top passers**

- ARI – Carson Palmer – 20/38, 255 yards, 3 TD, INT
- LA – Jared Goff – 13/20, 120 yards

**Top rushers**

- ARI – Kerwynn Williams – 12 rushes, 60 yards, TD
- LA – Todd Gurley – 14 rushes, 40 yards

**Top receivers**

- ARI – J. J. Nelson – 4 receptions, 75 yards
- LA – Todd Gurley – 4 receptions, 37 yards

The Rams' 2016 season came to an end on the first day of 2017 with yet another listless performance that capped off the franchise's 10th straight losing campaign. Kicker Greg Zuerlein provided the Rams' only scoring once again with field goals of 37 and 36 yards in the second quarter. Arizona quarterback Carson Palmer, who won the Heisman Trophy while playing at USC, had a successful day in his return to the Coliseum, passing for 255 yards and three touchdowns as the Cardinals scored 28 unanswered points in the second half. Offensively, quarterback Jared Goff completed 13 of 20 passes for 120 yards, but was sacked a season-high seven times. A year after winning NFL Offensive Rookie of the Year honors, Todd Gurley had 14 carries for 40 yards to finish the season with just 885 rushing yards despite playing in all 16 games. The Rams offense ended with a league-worst 224 points scored, and were held to 10 or fewer points for the ninth time in the season. Cornerback Blake Countess had nine tackles for the Rams, who finished their season at 46–12, 2-4 against the NFC West, and 1-6 in home games at the Los Angeles Memorial Coliseum.

== Standings ==
=== Division ===
NFC West
	W	L	T	PCT	DIV	CONF	PF	PA	STK
^{(3)} Seattle Seahawks	10	5	1	.656	3–2–1	6–5–1	354	292	W1
Arizona Cardinals	7	8	1	.469	4–1–1	6–5–1	418	362	W2
Los Angeles Rams	4	12	0	.250	2–4	3–9	224	394	L7
San Francisco 49ers	2	14	0	.125	2–4	2–10	309	480	L1

=== Conference ===
NFC
#	Team	Division	W	L	T	PCT	DIV	CONF	SOS	SOV	STK
Division leaders
1	Dallas Cowboys	East	13	3	0	.813	3–3	9–3	.471	.440	L1
2	Atlanta Falcons	South	11	5	0	.688	5–1	9–3	.480	.452	W4
3	Seattle Seahawks	West	10	5	1	.656	3–2–1	6–5–1	.441	.425	W1
4	Green Bay Packers	North	10	6	0	.625	5–1	8–4	.508	.453	W6
Wild Cards
5	New York Giants	East	11	5	0	.688	4–2	8–4	.486	.455	W1
6 (Note: Detroit finished ahead of Tampa Bay for the No. 6 seed and qualified for the last playoff spot based on record vs. common opponents—Detroit's cumulative record against Chicago, Dallas, Los Angeles and New Orleans was 3–2, while Tampa Bay's cumulative record against the same four teams was 2–3.)	Detroit Lions	North	9	7	0	.563	3–3	7–5	.475	.392	L3
Did not qualify for the postseason
7	Tampa Bay Buccaneers	South	9	7	0	.563	4–2	7–5	.492	.434	W1
8	Washington Redskins	East	8	7	1	.531	3–3	6–6	.516	.430	L1
9	Minnesota Vikings	North	8	8	0	.500	2–4	5–7	.492	.457	W1
10	Arizona Cardinals	West	7	8	1	.469	4–1–1	6–5–1	.463	.366	W2
11 (Note: New Orleans finished ahead of Philadelphia based on better record vs. conference opponents.)	New Orleans Saints	South	7	9	0	.438	2–4	6–6	.523	.393	L1
12	Philadelphia Eagles	East	7	9	0	.438	2–4	5–7	.559	.518	W2
13	Carolina Panthers	South	6	10	0	.375	1–5	5–7	.518	.354	L2
14	Los Angeles Rams	West	4	12	0	.250	2–4	3–9	.504	.500	L7
15	Chicago Bears	North	3	13	0	.188	2–4	3–9	.521	.396	L4
16	San Francisco 49ers	West	2	14	0	.125	2–4	2–10	.504	.250	L1
Tiebreakers (Note: When breaking ties for three or more teams under the NFL's rules, they are first broken within divisions, then comparing only the highest-ranked remaining team from each division.)

== Awards and honors ==
Recipient	awards
Aaron Donald	Week 4: NFC Defensive Player of the Week
Johnny Hekker	Week 10: NFC Special Teams Player of the Week
