= Troy Hill (American football) =

American football player (born 1991)

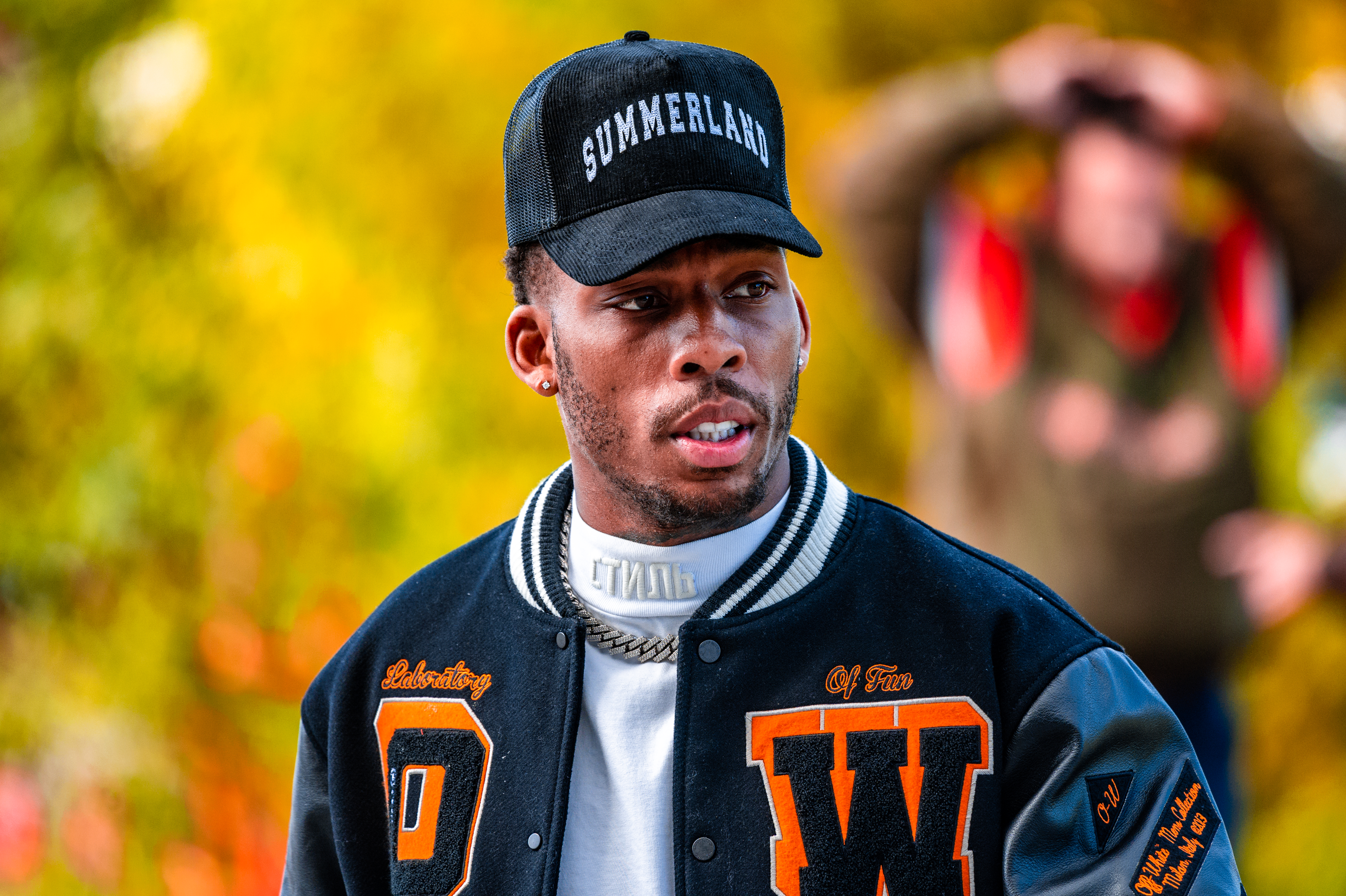
- Hill in 2021

No. 28, 32, 20, 22, 23, 2, 13, 25
- Position: Cornerback

Personal information
- Born: August 29, 1991 (age 35); Ventura, California, U.S.
- Listed height: 5 ft 10 in (1.78 m)
- Listed weight: 182 lb (83 kg)

Career information
- High school: St. Bonaventure (Ventura, California)
- College: Oregon (2010–2014)
- NFL draft: 2015: undrafted

Career history

Playing
- Cincinnati Bengals (2015); New England Patriots (2015); St. Louis / Los Angeles Rams (2015–2020); Cleveland Browns (2021); Los Angeles Rams (2022); Carolina Panthers (2023–2024); Tampa Bay Buccaneers (2024)

Coaching
- St. Bonaventure (CA) (2025–present) Head coach

Awards and highlights
- NFL defensive touchdowns leader (2020); Second-team All-Pac-12 (2014)

Career NFL statistics
- Total tackles: 414
- Sacks: 3.0
- Forced fumbles: 2
- Fumble recoveries: 3
- Pass deflections: 41
- Interceptions: 9
- Defensive touchdowns: 4
- Stats at Pro Football Reference

Troy Hill (born August 29, 1991) is an American former professional football player who was a cornerback in the National Football League (NFL) for 10 seasons. He played for the Cincinnati Bengals, New England Patriots, Los Angeles Rams, Cleveland Browns, and Carolina Panthers, and Tampa Bay Buccaneers. He played college football for the Oregon Ducks, and currently serves as the head coach for St. Bonaventure High School.

== Early life ==
Hill attended St. Bonaventure High School in Ventura, California. He played defensive back and wide receiver for a team that posted an 11–2 record his senior season; however, all of those wins were forfeited when it was learned that Hill was ineligible. Hill received high school honors, earning the 2009 All-Channel League First-Team Defense, 2008 Second-Team All-State Junior by CalHiSports.com, 2007 All-Channel League Second-Team Defense, and All-CIF-Southern Section Northern Division. Hill earned a three-star rating from Scout.com, also a three-star recruit according to Rivals.com, and the No. 32 corner in the country.

== College career ==
As a junior, Hill was the Ducks’ fifth-leading tackler among their defensive backs. Hill finished the year with 29 tackles with 21 tackles being solo and four deflected passes. As a senior in Oregon, Hill finished seventh on the team in tackles with 71. Hill was awarded with a second-team all-Pac-12 Conference choice and 14-game starter ranked second in the league (1.46 avg.) in passes defended and 11th nationally. Hill was arrested on December 16, 2013 and suspended from the team after he pleaded guilty to menacing; he was later reinstated to the team.

== Professional career ==
Pre-draft measurables
Height	Weight	Arm length	Hand span	40-yard dash	10-yard split	20-yard split	20-yard shuttle	Three-cone drill	Vertical jump	Broad jump	Bench press
5 ft 10 1/2 in (1.79 m)	182 lb (83 kg)	29 1/2 in (0.75 m)	8 3/4 in (0.22 m)	4.54 s	1.55 s	2.57 s	4.15 s	6.65 s	34.0 in (0.86 m)	10 ft 2 in (3.10 m)	8 reps
All values from NFL Combine/Pro Day

=== Cincinnati Bengals ===
On May 3, 2015, the Cincinnati Bengals signed Hill to a three-year, $1.58 million contract that includes a signing bonus of $5,500.

Throughout training camp, Hill competed for a roster spot as a backup cornerback against Chris Lewis-Harris, Onterio McCalebb, and Brandon Ghee. On September 5, 2015, the Bengals waived Hill, but signed him to their practice squad the next day after clearing waivers. On December 5, 2015, Hill was promoted from the practice squad to the Bengals’ active roster. Upon joining the active roster, head coach Marvin Lewis named Hill the fourth cornerback on the Bengals’ depth chart, behind Dre Kirkpatrick, Leon Hall, and Josh Shaw. On December 6, 2015, Hill made his professional regular season debut and recorded three solo tackles during a 37–3 win at the Cleveland Browns in Week 13. In Week 15, he collected a season-high three solo tackles in the Bengals’ 24–14 victory at the San Francisco 49ers. On December 24, 2015, the Bengals waived Hill and replaced him with Chris Lewis-Harris.

=== New England Patriots ===
On December 25, 2015, the New England Patriots claimed Hill off waivers. He appeared in three games for the Patriots and recorded six combined tackles (five solo). On December 30, New England officially waived Hill.

=== St. Louis / Los Angeles Rams ===
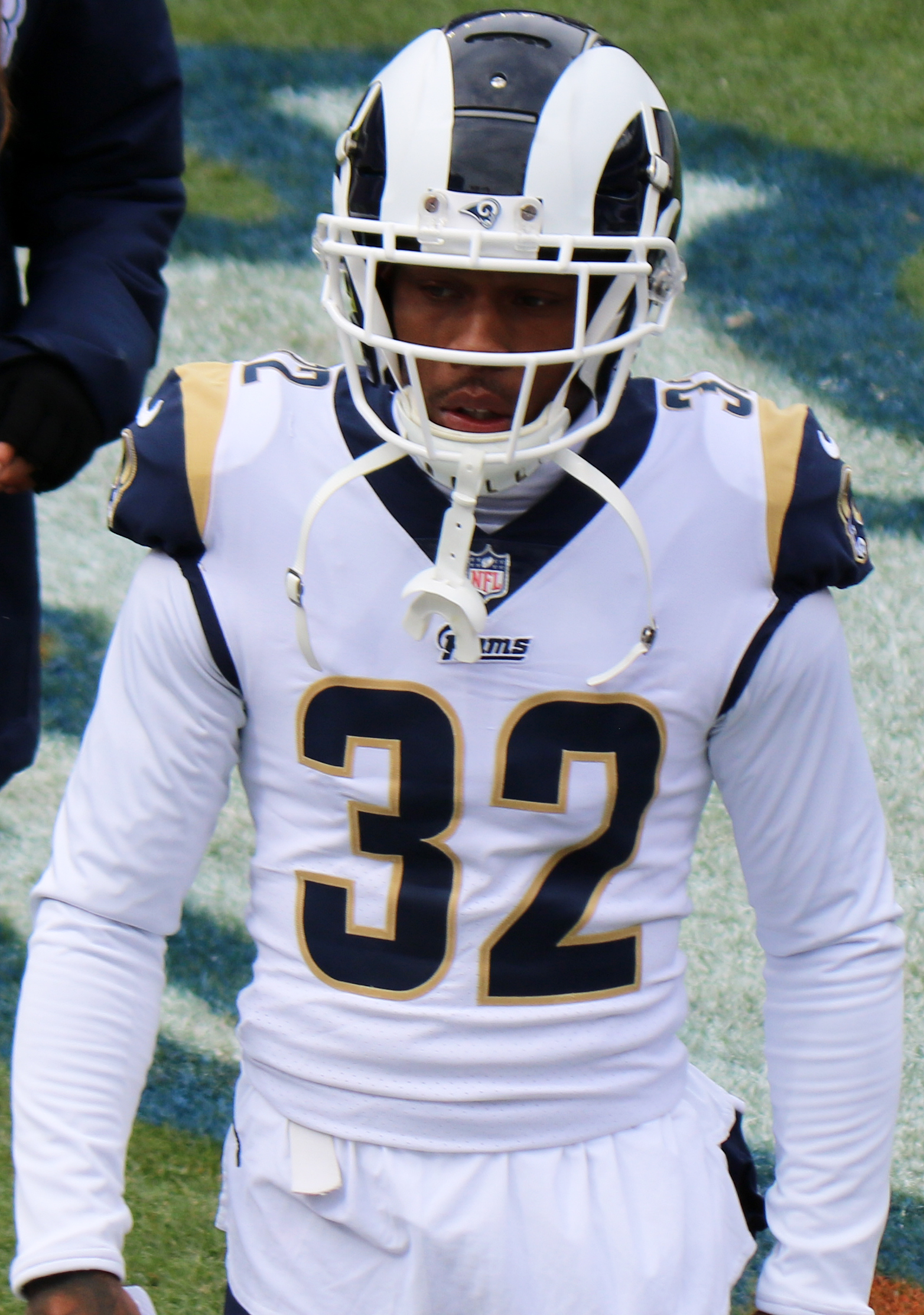
Hill with the Los Angeles Rams in 2018

On December 31, 2015, the St. Louis Rams claimed Hill off waivers from the New England Patriots. Hill was inactive for the Rams' season-ending 19–16 loss at 49ers.

Following the Rams' relocation to Los Angeles, Hill competed for a roster spot in training camp against Jabriel Washington and Mike Jordan. Head coach Jeff Fisher named Hill the fifth cornerback on the Rams’ depth chart to begin the regular season, behind Trumaine Johnson, E. J. Gaines, Coty Sensabaugh, and Lamarcus Joyner.

On September 25, 2016, Hill earned his first career start and collected a season-high 11 solo tackles during a 37–32 win at the Tampa Bay Buccaneers in Week 3. Hill earned his first career start after passing Coty Sensabaugh on the depth chart. Sensabaugh had a disappointing performance after replacing E.J Gaines who missed the first three games due to a thigh injury. Hill was inactive for the Rams’ Week 11 loss to the Miami Dolphins as a result of his arrest. On November 22, 2016, the Los Angeles Rams released Hill and signed him to their practice squad after he was arrested for suspicion of driving under the influence (See Personal life). On December 12, 2016, the Los Angeles Rams fired head coach Jeff Fisher after they fell to a 4–9 record. Special teams coordinator John Fassel was named the interim head coach for the remaining three games of the regular season. On December 13, 2016, the Los Angeles Rams promoted Hill to their active roster. He finished the 2016 NFL season with 40 combined tackles (32 solo) and two pass deflections in 12 games and four starts.

On January 13, 2017, the Los Angeles Rams announced their decision to hire Washington Redskins offensive coordinator Sean McVay as their new head coach. On May 1, 2017, the NFL announced their decision to suspend Hill for the first two games of the 2017 NFL season after violating the NFL’s Substance Abuse Policy. Throughout training camp, Hill competed for a roster spot as a backup cornerback against Nickell Robey-Coleman and Mike Jordan. Upon returning from his three-game suspension, head coach Sean McVay named Hill the fifth cornerback on the Rams’ depth chart, behind Trumaine Johnson, Kayvon Webster, Nickell Robey-Coleman, and Dominique Hatfield.

Hill was inactive for a Week 6 victory at the Jacksonville Jaguars due to a shoulder injury. He was also sidelined for the Rams’ Week 11 loss at the Minnesota Vikings after suffering a hamstring injury. Hill started the final three games of the regular season as well as the wild card loss to the Atlanta Falcons in place of the injured Kayvon Webster, who suffered a season-ending Achilles injury in Week 14.

On March 12, 2019, the Rams tendered Hill as a restricted free agent. He was re-signed to a two-year deal on May 30, 2019.

After wearing #32 since becoming a Ram, Hill voluntarily gave up his jersey number during the 2019 offseason after being paid $32,000 by free agent signee Eric Weddle and switched to #20. During the 2019 season, Hill changed his number from #20 to #22 to accommodate the acquisition of Jalen Ramsey, for which Ramsey reportedly paid $20,000. In Week 11 against the Chicago Bears on Sunday Night Football, Hill recorded six tackles, sacked Mitch Trubisky once, and intercepted a pass thrown by Trubisky in the 17–7 win.

In Week 2 of the 2020 season against the Philadelphia Eagles, Hill recorded his second interception of the season off a pass thrown by Carson Wentz late in the fourth quarter to secure a 37–19 Rams' win. In Week 12, against the 49ers, Hill recovered a fumble forced by teammate Aaron Donald on Raheem Mostert and returned it for a 20 yard touchdown during the 23–20 loss. In Week 13 against the Arizona Cardinals, Hill intercepted a pass thrown by Kyler Murray and returned it for a 35-yard touchdown during the 38–28 win. In Week 17 against the Arizona Cardinals, Hill intercepted a pass thrown by Chris Streveler and returned it for an 84 yard touchdown during the 18–7 win.

=== Cleveland Browns ===
On March 22, 2021, Hill signed a four-year, $24 million with the Browns.

=== Los Angeles Rams (second stint) ===
On April 30, 2022, the Browns traded Hill to the Rams for a fifth-round pick in the 2023 NFL draft. He was placed on injured reserve on September 20, 2022 after suffering a groin injury in Week 2. He was designated to return from injured reserve on October 24, 2022, and activated for Week 8. Hill started 12 games for the Rams, recording 67 tackles (45 solo) and an interception.

=== Carolina Panthers ===
On August 20, 2023, Hill signed with the Carolina Panthers. He played in 16 games with three starts, recording 48 tackles, one forced fumble, and a 61-yard interception return for a touchdown.

On March 13, 2024, Hill signed a one-year contract extension with the Panthers. In 6 games (2 starts) for Carolina, he logged 32 combined tackles. On October 18, Hill was released by the Panthers.

=== Tampa Bay Buccaneers ===
On October 30, 2024, Hill was signed to the Tampa Bay Buccaneers practice squad. He was promoted to the active roster on November 18.

== Coaching career ==
On May 13, 2025, Hill was hired to serve as the head football coach at his alma mater, St. Bonaventure High School.

== NFL career statistics ==
=== Regular season statistics ===
Year	Team	Games		Tackles				Interceptions						Fumbles	
Year	Team	GP	GS	Comb	Solo	Ast	Sack	PD	Int	Yds	Avg	Lng	TD	FF	FR
2015	CIN	3	0	6	5	1	0.0	0	0	0	0.0	0	0	0	0
2016	LAR	12	4	40	35	5	0.0	2	0	0	0.0	0	0	0	0
2017	LAR	12	3	18	16	2	0.0	4	0	0	0.0	0	0	0	1
2018	LAR	16	7	34	29	5	0.0	5	2	7	3.5	7	0	0	0
2019	LAR	14	9	43	32	11	1.0	8	2	6	3.0	6	0	0	0
2020	LAR	16	16	77	55	22	0.0	10	3	119	39.7	84	2	1	2
2021	CLE	12	4	49	34	15	2.0	1	0	0	0.0	0	0	0	0
2022	LAR	12	12	67	45	22	0.0	4	1	5	5.0	5	0	0	0
Total		97	55	334	251	83	3.0	34	8	137	18.9	84	2	1	3

== Personal life ==
While at the University of Oregon, Hill majored in social science. On November 19, 2016, Hill was arrested by California Highway Patrol for suspicion of drunk driving. Hill was driving on U.S. Route 101 in his white Mercedes-Benz just before 8AM and swerved into a semi-trailer truck. California Highway Patrol responded to the scene of the accident and arrested Hill after noticing signs of intoxication and performing a field sobriety test. Hill was taken to the Los Angeles Police Department’s Van Nuys station and was booked and processed before posting a $15,000 bail.
