= Alec Ogletree =

American football player (born 1991)

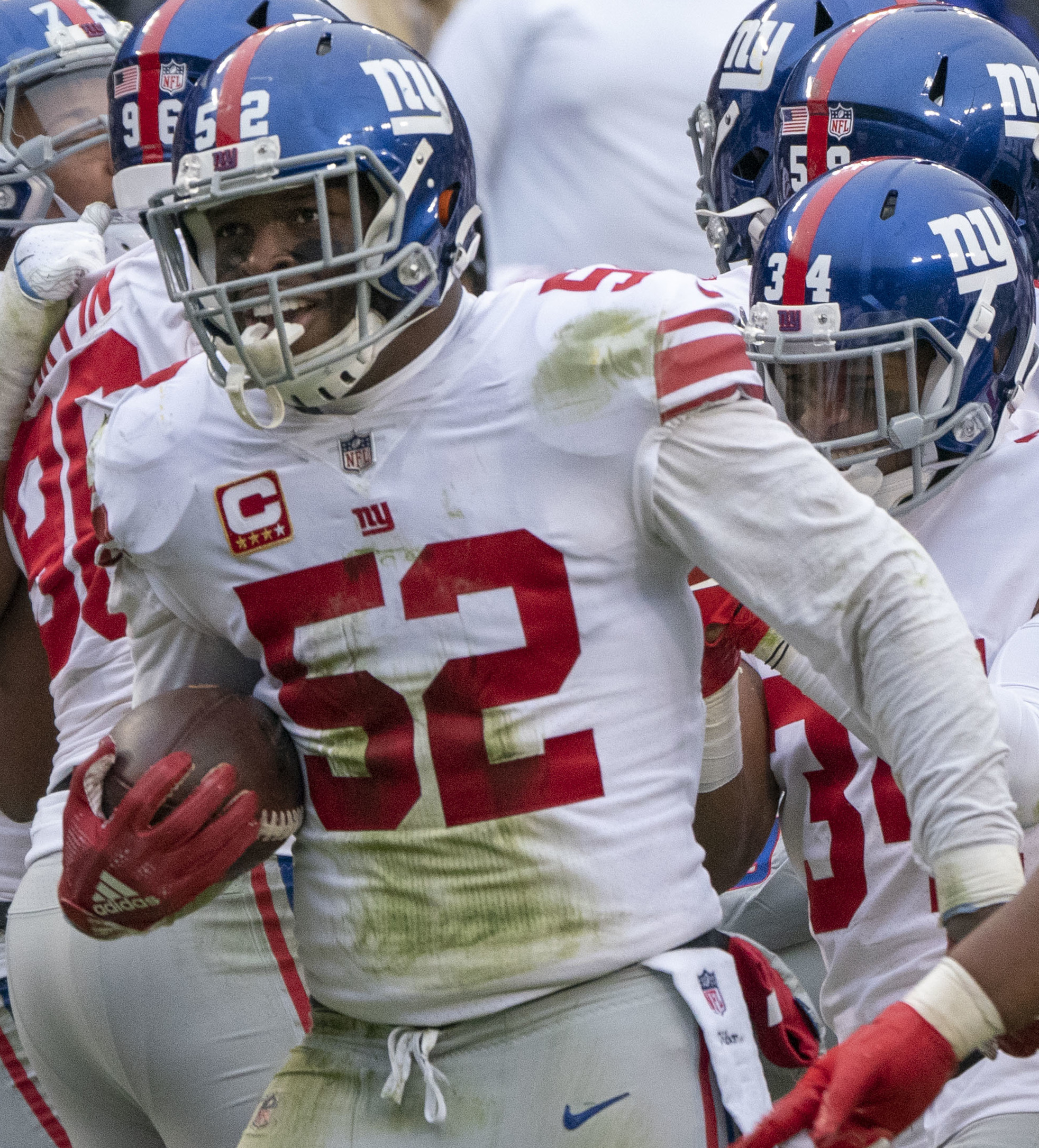
- Ogletree with the New York Giants in 2018

No. 52, 47, 44
- Position: Linebacker

Personal information
- Born: September 25, 1991 (age 35); Newnan, Georgia, U.S.
- Listed height: 6 ft 3 in (1.91 m)
- Listed weight: 280 lb (127 kg)

Career information
- High school: Newnan
- College: Georgia (2010–2012)
- NFL draft: 2013: 1st round, 30th overall pick

Career history
- St. Louis / Los Angeles Rams (2013–2017); New York Giants (2018–2019); New York Jets (2020); Chicago Bears (2021)

Awards and highlights
- Second-team All-Pro (2016); PFWA All-Rookie Team (2013); Second-team All-SEC (2012)

Career NFL statistics
- Total tackles: 766
- Sacks: 7.5
- Forced fumbles: 13
- Fumble recoveries: 2
- Pass deflections: 61
- Interceptions: 12
- Defensive touchdowns: 4
- Stats at Pro Football Reference

Alec Ogletree (born September 25, 1991) is an American former professional football player who was a linebacker in the National Football League (NFL). He played college football for the University of Georgia and was selected by the St. Louis Rams in the first round of the 2013 NFL draft. He also played in the NFL for the New York Giants, New York Jets, and Chicago Bears.

== Early life ==
Ogletree and his twin brother Alexander "Zander" were born in Newnan, Georgia. He attended Newnan High School, where he played high school football and basketball and ran track for the Newnan Cougars, regarded as one of the best teams in Newnan. He was widely considered to be one of the top football prospects of the 2010 high school class. He was rated as the No. 22 recruit by Scout.com, the No. 29 recruit in the ESPNU 150, and the No. 40 player by Rivals.com.

In his sophomore season, Ogletree had six blocked punts and returned one for a touchdown. He had 75 tackles, three interceptions and six blocked punts as a junior. In his senior year, Ogletree had 85 tackles, 5 tackles for loss, 2 forced fumbles, two interceptions and two blocked kicks on defense—and he had 33 receptions for 633 yards and 5 touchdowns on offense.

Also a standout track and field athlete, Ogletree was one of the state's top performers in the long jump. He captured the state title in the long jump event at the 2010 GHSA Region 4-AAAAA track and field championships, with a PR leap of 7.30 meters (23 ft, 11 in). He also ran the 400-meter dash and was a member of the Newnan 4×100-meter relay squad.

Following his senior season in 2009, he was recognized as a high school All-American by Under Armour, USA Today, and Parade. Ogletree verbally committed to attend the University of Georgia in June 2009. He made his commitment official by signing his letter of intent to play at Georgia on February 3, 2010, choosing it over tens of other Division-1 schools including the University of Alabama, Auburn University, University of Florida, and Florida State University. His brother Zander also went to UGA, playing fullback.

== College career ==
Ogletree received an athletic scholarship to attend the University of Georgia, where he played for coach Mark Richt's Georgia Bulldogs football team from 2010 to 2012.

In 2010, Ogletree returned from his one-game suspension and was inserted into all the special team units. He eventually started getting some small amounts of playing time at safety. He was inserted into the starting strong safety spot for the final 3 games of the regular season for Georgia.

In 2011, Ogletree broke his foot during the first quarter of Georgia's season opener vs. Boise State. He missed the following six games, returning for the Florida game on October 29. Against No. 1 LSU in the 2011 SEC Championship Game, he recorded 6 tackles including two for a loss, 1 sack and recovered a 1st quarter onside kick. In a little over 8 games, Ogletree finished the 2011 season with 52 tackles (6.5 per game) including 7.5 for a loss, 3 sacks, 2 forced fumbles and a pass deflection that was intercepted.

== Professional career ==
External videos
- Alec Ogletree's NFL Combine Workout
- Alec Ogletree's 40-yard dash

Pre-draft measurables
Height	Weight	Arm length	Hand span	40-yard dash	10-yard split	20-yard split	20-yard shuttle	Three-cone drill	Vertical jump	Broad jump	Bench press
6 ft 2 1/2 in (1.89 m)	242 lb (110 kg)	33 1/2 in (0.85 m)	10 in (0.25 m)	4.70 s	1.56 s	2.66 s	4.39 s	7.16 s	33 1/2 in (0.85 m)	10 ft 2 in (3.10 m)	20 reps
All values from NFL Combine

=== St. Louis / Los Angeles Rams ===
==== 2013 ====
The St. Louis Rams selected Ogletree in the first round (30th overall) of the 2013 NFL draft. Ogletree was the second linebacker drafted in 2013, behind Georgia's Jarvis Jones (17th overall, Steelers). On July 14, 2013, the Rams signed Ogletree to a four-year, $7.03 million contract that includes $5.66 million guaranteed and a signing bonus of $3.49 million.

External videos
- Rams draft Alec Ogletree 30th overall
- NFL Draft Profile: Alec Ogletree

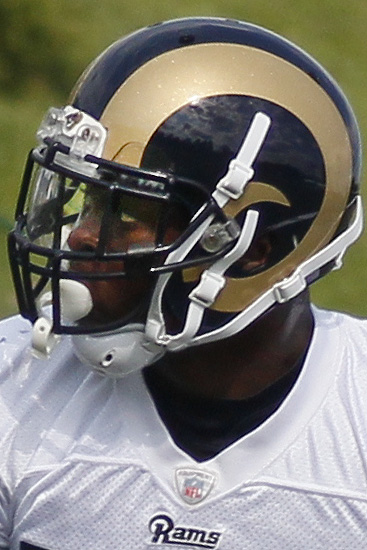
Ogletree with the Rams in 2013

Head coach Jeff Fisher named Ogletree a starting outside linebacker to start the regular season, alongside Will Witherspoon and middle linebacker James Laurinaitis. He made his professional regular season debut and first career start in the St. Louis Rams' season-opener against the Arizona Cardinals and recorded seven solo tackles and forced a fumble in their 27–24 victory. Ogletree made his first career regular season tackle on tight end Jim Dray after a ten-yard reception by Dray in the first quarter. On October 13, 2013, Ogletree recorded ten combined tackles (seven solo), deflected a pass, forced a fumble, and returned his first career interception for a touchdown during a 38–14 win at the Houston Texans in Week 6. He intercepted a pass by quarterback T. J. Yates, that was intended for tight end Garrett Graham, and returned it for a 98-yard touchdown in the fourth quarter. In Week 12, he collected a season-high 11 combined tackles (ten solo) and broke up a pass in the Rams' 42–21 victory against the Chicago Bears. On December 8, 2013, Ogletree recorded nine combined tackles (eight solo) and made his first career sack during a 30–10 loss at the Arizona Cardinals in Week 14. Ogletree made his first a career sack on quarterback Carson Palmer for a seven-yard loss in the third quarter. He finished his rookie season in 2013 with 117 combined tackles (94 solo), ten pass deflections, six forced fumbles, 1.5 sacks, an interception, and a touchdown in 16 games and 16 starts. He was named to the PFWA All-Rookie Team.

==== 2014 ====
On January 29, 2014, the St. Louis Rams announced the decision to fire defensive coordinator Tim Walton after finishing 15th in the league in overall defense during his lone season with the Rams in 2013. Ogletree entered training camp slated as the starting weakside linebacker. Head coach Jeff Fisher named Ogletree and Jo-Lonn Dunbar the starting outside linebackers to begin the regular season, along with middle linebacker James Laurinaitis.

In Week 3, he collected a season-high ten solo tackles during a 34–31 loss to the Dallas Cowboys. On November 9, 2014, Ogletree made seven combined tackles, a season-high three pass deflections, and an interception during a 31–14 loss at the Arizona Cardinals in Week 10. The following week, Ogletree collected a season-high 13 combined tackles (ten solo), two pass deflections, and intercepted a pass by quarterback Peyton Manning during a 22–7 win against the Denver Broncos in Week 11. He started all 16 games in 2014 and finished the season with 111 combined tackles (85 solo), a career-high 12 passes defensed, four forced fumbles, and two interceptions.

==== 2015 ====
Head coach Jeff Fisher retained Ogletree as the starting weakside linebacker to begin the regular season. He started alongside middle linebacker James Laurinaitis and strongside linebacker Akeem Ayers. In Week 2, he collected a season-high 16 combined tackles (eight solo) during a 24–10 loss at the Washington Redskins. On September 27, 2015, Ogletree made nine combined tackles and a season-high two sacks in the Rams' 12–6 loss to the Pittsburgh Steelers. Ogletree sacked quarterback Ben Roethlisberger for a nine-yard loss in the third quarter and sacked backup quarterback Michael Vick in the fourth quarter to earn his first multi-sack game of his career. On October 4, 2015, Ogletree recorded ten combined tackles (nine solo) before exiting during the second half of the Rams' 24–22 victory at the Arizona Cardinals due to an ankle injury. After the game, head coach Jeff Fisher stated Ogletree's ankle would require surgery. On October 27, 2015, the St. Louis Rams placed Ogletree on injured reserve with a designation to return due to a broken fibula. Ogletree finished the 2015 season with 42 combined tackles (27 solo) and two sacks in four games and four starts.

==== 2016 ====
During the offseason, the St. Louis Rams officially moved to Los Angeles. On February 24, 2016, head coach Jeff Fisher announced that Ogletree would move from weakside linebacker to middle linebacker following the release of veteran James Laurinaitis. On May 2, 2016, the Los Angeles Rams exercised Ogletree's fifth-year option on his rookie contract. Under the fifth-year option, Ogletree received $8.36 million and remained with the Rams for the 2016 season. Head coach Jeff Fisher officially named Ogletree the starting middle linebacker to start the regular season.

He started in the Los Angeles Rams' season-opener at the San Francisco 49ers and collected a season-high 11 solo tackles, assisted on a tackle, and deflected a pass during a 28–0 loss. On November 13, 2016, Ogletree made nine combined tackles, a season-high two pass deflections, and an interception during a 9–6 victory at the New York Jets. Ogletree intercepted a pass attempt by quarterback Bryce Petty, that was initially intended for wide receiver Quincy Enunwa, and sealed the Rams' victory in the fourth quarter. In Week 13, he collected a season-high 14 combined tackles (four solo) in the Rams' 26–10 loss at the New England Patriots. On December 12, 2016, the Los Angeles Rams fired head coach Jeff Fisher after the Rams fell to a 4–9 record. On December 15, 2016, Ogletree recorded seven combined tackles, two pass deflections, and made an interception as the Rams lost 24–3 at the Seattle Seahawks Week 15. He intercepted a pass by quarterback Russell Wilson, that was originally intended for wide receiver Jermaine Kearse, in the fourth quarter. He started in all 16 games in 2016 and recorded a career-high 136 combined tackles (98 solo), 11 pass deflections, two interceptions, and a forced fumble. Ogletree finished with the seventh most combined tackles in the league.

==== 2017 ====
The Los Angeles Rams hired Wade Phillips as their new defensive coordinator and installed his base 3-4 defense. Head coach Sean McVay officially named Ogletree and Mark Barron the starting inside linebackers to begin the regular season, along with starting outside linebackers Connor Barwin and Robert Quinn.

On October 12, 2017, the Los Angeles Rams signed Ogletree to a four-year, $42.75 million contract extension with $21.36 million guaranteed and a signing bonus of $8 million. In Week 11, he collected a season-high 12 combined tackles (11 solo) and a pass deflection during a 24–7 loss at the Minnesota Vikings. On December 3, 2017, Ogletree made a solo tackle, a pass deflection, and returned an interception for his second career touchdown during a 32–16 win at the Arizona Cardinals. He intercepted a pass attempt by quarterback Blaine Gabbert, that was intended for running back D. J. Foster, and returned it for a 41-yard touchdown during the first quarter. Head coach Sean McVay chose to rest Ogletree, along with the starters, for the Rams' Week 17 matchup against the San Francisco 49ers as the Rams had already clinched the NFC West division with an 11–4 record. He finished the 2017 season with 95 combined tackles (63 solo), ten pass deflections, two sacks, an interception, a forced fumble, and a touchdown in 15 games and 15 starts.

The Los Angeles Rams finished first in the NFC West with an 11–5 record and clinched a wildcard berth. On January 6, 2018, Ogletree started in his first career playoff game and recorded five solo tackles during a 26–13 loss to the Atlanta Falcons in the NFC Wildcard Game.

=== New York Giants ===
==== 2018 ====
On March 7, 2018, the Rams agreed to trade Ogletree and a 2019 seventh-round pick to the New York Giants in exchange for a fourth and a sixth round pick in the 2018 NFL draft. The fourth round pick was used to select John Franklin-Myers, while the sixth round pick was used to select John Kelly. The deal became official on March 14, 2018, at the start of the new league year. In Week 13 against the Chicago Bears, Ogletree intercepted Chase Daniel twice including a Pick Six in a 30–27 overtime win.

==== 2019 ====
During training camp, Ogletree switched from No. 52 to No. 47 after trading with fellow linebacker Jake Carlock.

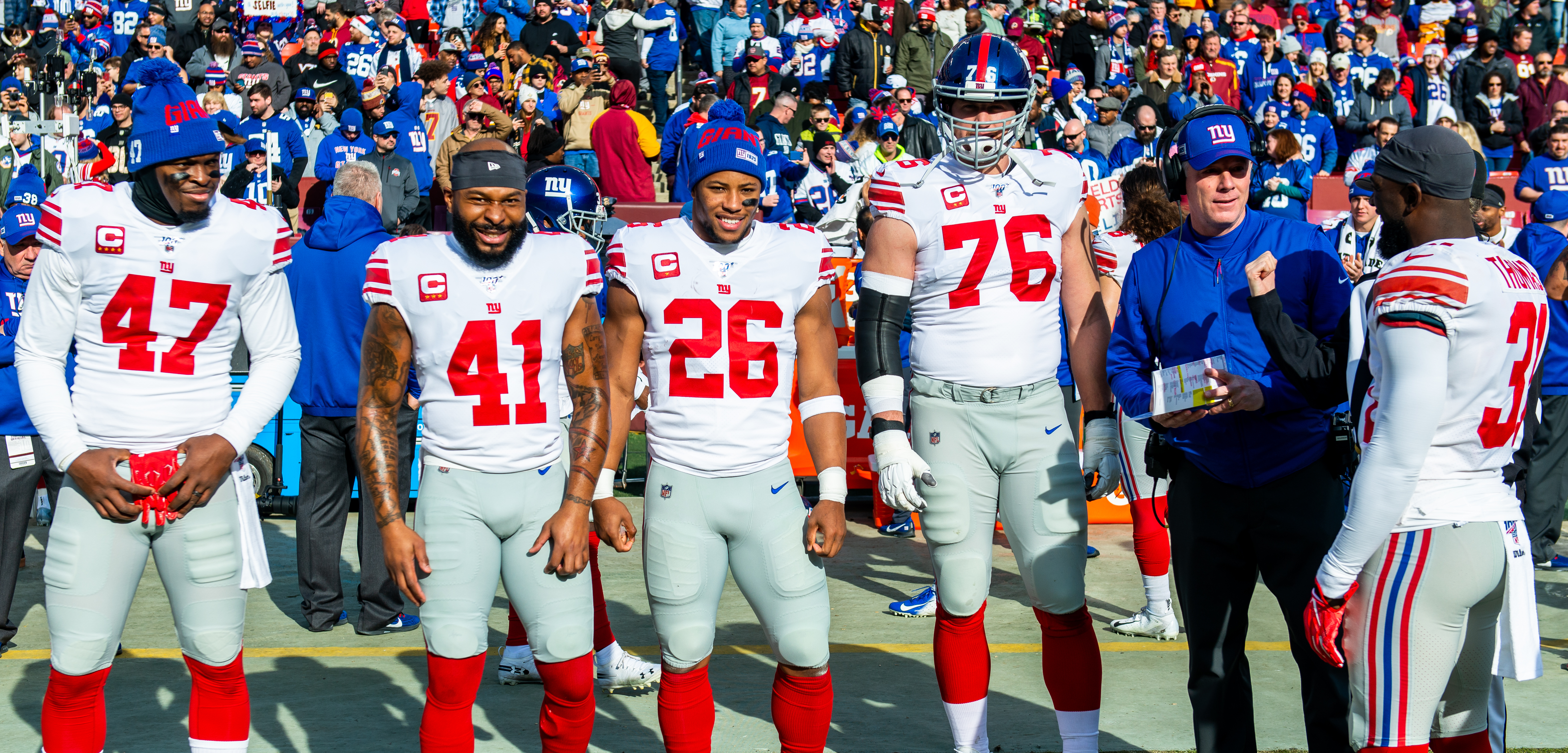
Ogletree alongside other Giants' team captains in a game against the Washington Redskins

In week 6 against the New England Patriots, Ogletree recorded 12 tackles and sacked Tom Brady once in the 35–14 loss. In week 12 against the Chicago Bears, Ogletree recorded his first interception of the season off Mitch Trubisky in the 19–14 loss.

On February 26, 2020, Ogletree was released by the Giants.

=== New York Jets ===
On September 10, 2020, Ogletree was signed to the New York Jets practice squad. He was promoted to the active roster on September 19, 2020. He was released on October 10.

=== Chicago Bears ===
On August 4, 2021, Ogletree signed with the Chicago Bears, reuniting him with former Los Angeles Rams linebacker Robert Quinn. Ogletree started all 16 games for Chicago in 2021, tallying 87 combined tackles, four pass deflections, and a forced fumble.

On June 21, 2023, Ogletree announced his retirement from professional football.

== NFL career statistics ==
Year	Team	Games		Tackles				Fumbles				Interceptions					
Year	Team	GP	GS	Cmb	Solo	Ast	Sck	FF	FR	Yds	TD	PD	Int	Yds	Avg	Lng	TD
2013	STL	16	16	119	95	24	1.5	6	0	0	0	10	1	98	98.0	98T	1
2014	STL	16	16	111	84	27	0.0	4	0	0	0	12	2	44	22.0	44	0
2015	STL	4	4	42	27	15	2.0	0	0	0	0	0	0	0	0.0	0	0
2016	LAR	16	16	136	98	38	0.0	1	1	0	0	11	2	15	7.5	8	0
2017	LAR	15	15	95	63	32	2.0	1	1	0	0	10	1	41	41.0	41T	1
2018	NYG	13	13	93	58	35	1.0	0	0	0	0	8	5	61	12.2	20	2
2019	NYG	13	13	80	48	32	1.0	0	0	0	0	6	1	0	0.0	0	0
2020	NYJ	2	1	3	3	0	0.0	0	0	0	0	0	0	0	0.0	0	0
2021	CHI	16	16	87	55	32	0.0	1	0	0	0	4	0	0	0.0	0	0
Career		111	110	766	531	235	7.5	13	2	0	0	61	12	259	21.6	98T	4

== Personal life ==
Ogletree has two older sisters, Allysia Arnold, Amanda melson and a twin brother, Alexander "Zander" Ogletree, who played fullback for the University of Georgia. His brother-in-law is safety Andrew Adams.

In September 2010, Ogletree was arrested and charged with misdemeanor theft stemming from a June incident of a stolen scooter helmet. Ogletree was suspended by Georgia for the first game of the season. In February 2013, just days before the 2013 NFL Combine, Ogletree was arrested on charges of DUI in Arizona, per a statement released by his agent.
