= Jake McQuaide =

American football player (born 1987)

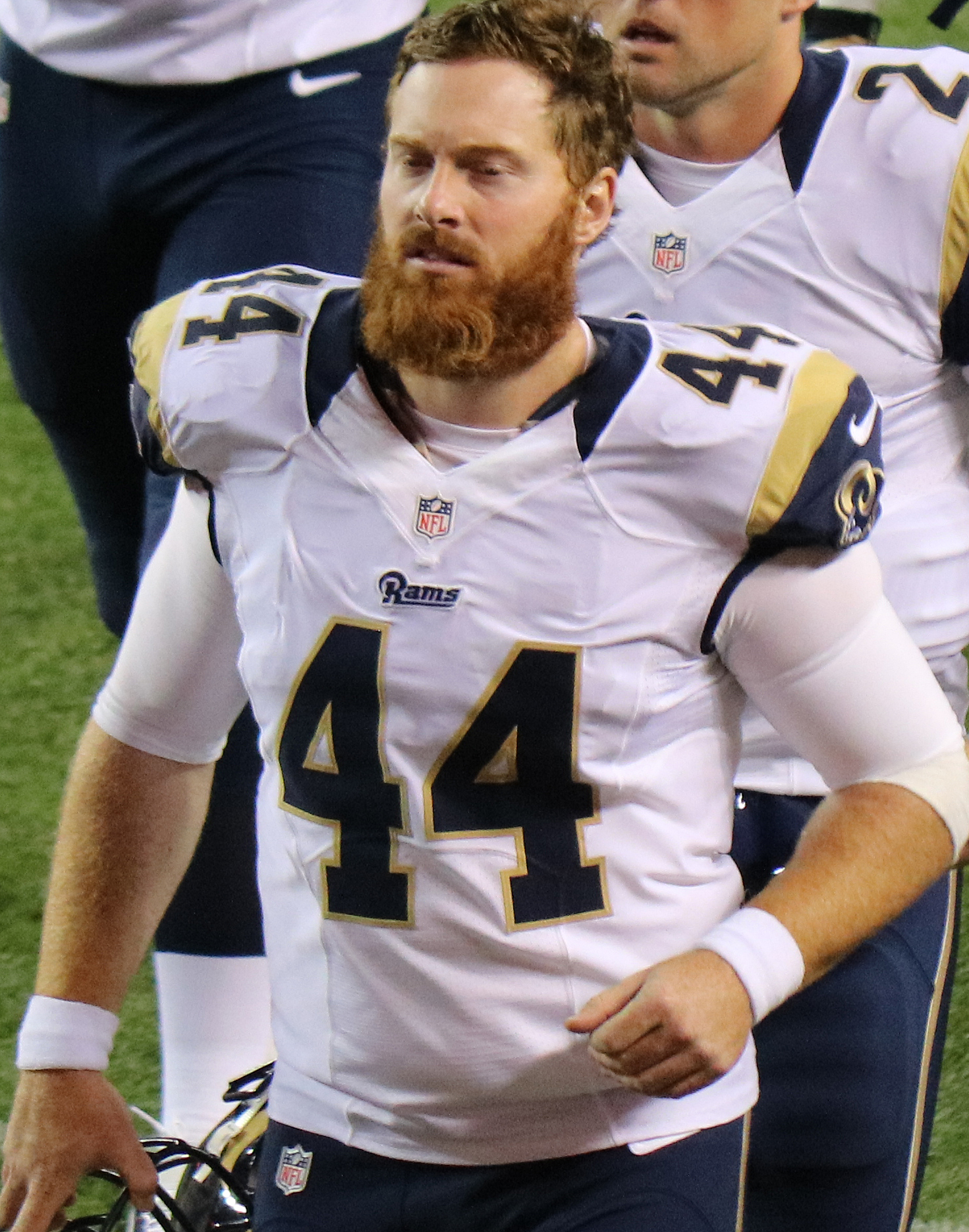
- McQuaide with the Los Angeles Rams in 2016

Profile
- Position: Long snapper

Personal information
- Born: December 7, 1987 (age 38); Cincinnati, Ohio, U.S.
- Listed height: 6 ft 2 in (1.88 m)
- Listed weight: 235 lb (107 kg)

Career information
- High school: Elder (Cincinnati)
- College: Ohio State (2006–2010)
- NFL draft: 2011: undrafted

Career history
- St. Louis / Los Angeles Rams (2011–2020); Dallas Cowboys (2021–2022); Detroit Lions (2023); Chicago Bears (2024)*; Minnesota Vikings (2024); Miami Dolphins (2024); Pittsburgh Steelers (2025)*; Los Angeles Rams (2025–2026)
- * Offseason or practice squad member only

Awards and highlights
- 2× Pro Bowl (2016, 2017)

Career NFL statistics as of Week 10, 2026
- Games played: 209
- Total tackles: 11
- Stats at Pro Football Reference

Jacob McQuaide (born December 7, 1987) is an American professional football long snapper. After playing college football for the Ohio State Buckeyes, McQuaide began his pro career when he was signed by the St. Louis Rams as an undrafted free agent in 2011. McQuaide played his first 10 seasons in the NFL with the Rams franchise, then continued his professional career spending time on the rosters of six other NFL teams over four seasons before returning to the Rams in 2025.

== Early life ==
McQuaide attended Elder High School. As a sophomore, he contributed to the football team winning an OHSAA State Championship. As a senior, he had 10 receptions for 125 yards at tight end. He also lettered in basketball.

He walked-on at Ohio State University. As a redshirt freshman, he was rotated in the first seven games at long snapper, along with seniors Dimitrios Makridis and Jackson Haas. He was removed from the rotation the rest of the season because of inconsistency issues and did not play in the last six contests.

As a sophomore, he was named the team's long snapper for punts and placement kicks, while earning a football scholarship.

During his college career, he remained as team's long snapper, but was never able to take snaps or record any stats at the tight end position. He was a part of three Big Ten Conference championships (2007, 2008 and 2009).

== Professional career ==
Pre-draft measurables
Height	Weight	40-yard dash	10-yard split	20-yard split	20-yard shuttle	Three-cone drill	Vertical jump	Broad jump	Bench press
6 ft 2 1/8 in (1.88 m)	239 lb (108 kg)	5.07 s	1.68 s	2.88 s	4.48 s	7.10 s	29.0 in (0.74 m)	9 ft 1 in (2.77 m)	19 reps
All values from Pro Day

=== St. Louis / Los Angeles Rams (first stint) ===
McQuaide was signed as an undrafted free agent by the St. Louis Rams after the 2011 NFL draft on July 29. As a rookie, he beat Chris Massey for the long snapper job.

He served as the Rams' long snapper in every game from 2011 to 2020. As a member of the Los Angeles Rams, McQuaide was selected to his first Pro Bowl as a "need" player on January 18, 2017. He was selected to his second consecutive Pro Bowl as a "need" player on January 17, 2018.

On March 9, 2018, McQuaide signed a three-year contract extension with the Rams through the 2020 season. During his time with the Rams, he appeared in all 160 regular season games and six playoff games through his first 10 seasons and made 10 special teams tackles.

=== Dallas Cowboys ===
On March 22, 2021, McQuaide signed with the Dallas Cowboys to replace long snapper L. P. Ladouceur, reuniting with special teams coordinator John Fassel, who was his coach with the Rams, along with his former teammate placekicker Greg Zuerlein.

On March 14, 2022, McQuaide re-signed with Dallas on a one-year contract. He was released in a planned move during final roster cuts on August 30, and re–signed on September 1, after players' allocations to the designated to return injured reserve list were official. In the fourth game against the Washington Commanders, he suffered a torn left triceps on his final snap. On October 4, 2022, McQuaide was placed on the injured reserve list, forcing him to miss the first games of his career. He was replaced with Matt Overton.

=== Detroit Lions ===
On March 20, 2023, McQuaide signed a one-year contract with the Detroit Lions. He was waived on August 7, 2023. He was re-signed to the practice squad on November 1, following an injury to Scott Daly and signed to the active roster on November 15. McQuaide appeared in the final nine games of the regular season and all three games of the Lions' postseason run to the NFC Championship Game.

=== Chicago Bears ===
On October 15, 2024, McQuaide signed with the Chicago Bears practice squad. He did not see any game action and was released on October 29.

=== Minnesota Vikings ===
On November 5, 2024, McQuaide signed with the Minnesota Vikings to replace the injured Andrew DePaola. From Week 10 through Week 13, McQuaide participated in four games for the Vikings, was promoted to the active roster on November 27 and then waived on December 3.

=== Miami Dolphins ===
On December 16, 2024, McQuaide was signed to the Miami Dolphins practice squad, and promoted to the active roster the next day.

=== Pittsburgh Steelers ===
On August 18, 2025, McQuaide signed with the Pittsburgh Steelers following a preseason injury sustained by Christian Kuntz. However, he was released by the Steelers on August 24.

=== Los Angeles Rams (second stint) ===
On November 4, 2025, McQuaide signed with the Los Angeles Rams' practice squad. He was elevated to the active roster on November 8 and played the following day in the Rams' 42-26 victory in Week 10 over the San Francisco 49ers, snapping on all punts and placekicking attempts. He was signed to the active roster on November 10, replacing Alex Ward. McQuaide played in all nine of the Rams' remaining games of the regular season and in all three playoff games for the team.

On October 28, 2026, McQuaide signed with the Los Angeles Rams practice squad. On November 21, he was released.
