= Josh Forrest =

American football player (born 1992)

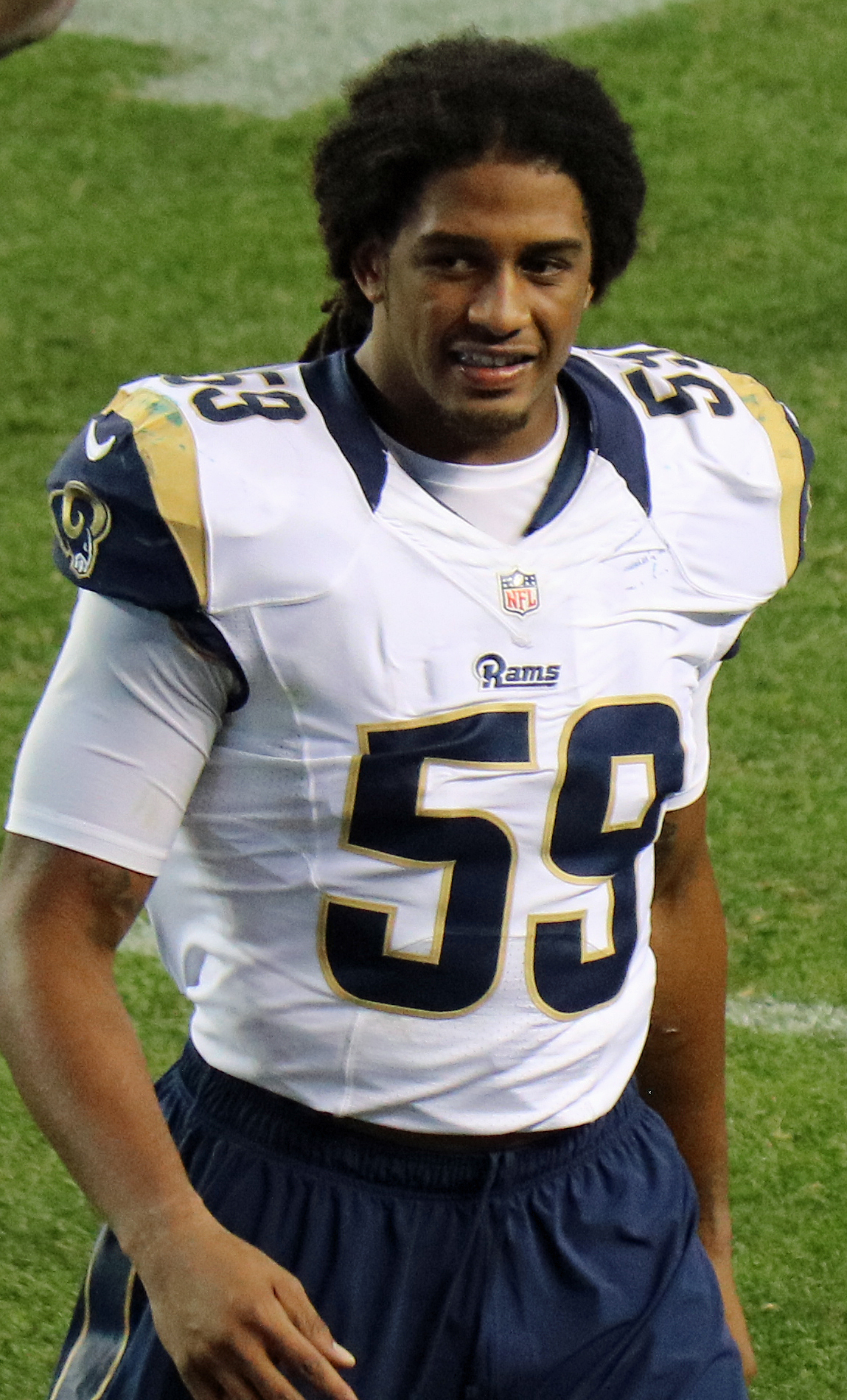
- Forrest with the Los Angeles Rams in 2016

No. 59
- Position: Linebacker

Personal information
- Born: February 24, 1992 (age 34); Paducah, Kentucky, U.S.
- Listed height: 6 ft 3 in (1.91 m)
- Listed weight: 249 lb (113 kg)

Career information
- High school: Paducah Tilghman
- College: Kentucky (2011–2015)
- NFL draft: 2016: 6th round, 190th overall pick

Career history
- Los Angeles Rams (2016); Seattle Seahawks (2017)

Career NFL statistics
- Total tackles: 9
- Fumble recoveries: 1
- Stats at Pro Football Reference

Josh Forrest (born February 24, 1992) is an American former professional football player who was a linebacker in the National Football League (NFL). He played college football for the Kentucky Wildcats and was selected by the Los Angeles Rams in the sixth round of the 2016 NFL draft.

== College career ==
Forrest played college football for the University of Kentucky. He originally was a reserved and did not start until his junior year, where he led the Wildcats in tackles for two years straight.

== Professional career ==
=== Los Angeles Rams ===
Forrest was selected by the Los Angeles Rams on in the sixth round, 190th overall pick in the 2016 NFL draft. On June 9, 2016, the Rams signed Forrest to a four-year contract with the team. He was placed on injured reserve on November 22, 2016.

On September 2, 2017, Forrest was waived/injured by the Rams and placed on injured reserve. He was released on September 9, 2017.

=== Seattle Seahawks ===
On October 16, 2017, Forrest was signed to the practice squad of the Seattle Seahawks. He was promoted to the active roster on November 7, 2017. He was placed on injured reserve on December 2, 2017.

On August 2, 2018, Forrest re-signed with the Seahawks. He was waived on September 1, 2018.
