= John Fassel =

American football player and coach (born 1974)

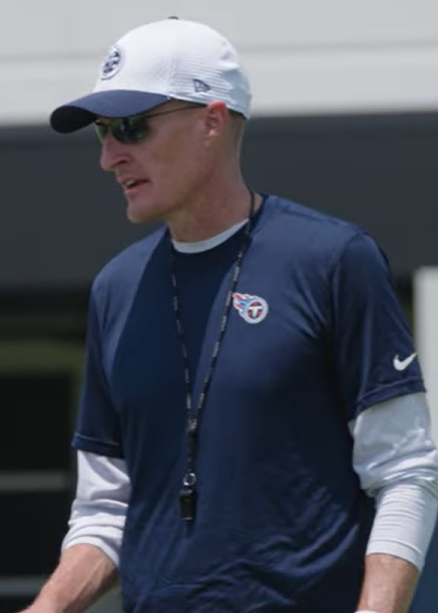
- Fassel with the Tennessee Titans in 2025

Tennessee Titans
- Title: Special teams coordinator, Assistant head coach

Personal information
- Born: January 10, 1974 (age 52); Anaheim, California, U.S.

Career information
- Position: Wide receiver
- High school: Morris Catholic
- College: Pacific (CA); Weber State

Career history
- Bucknell (1999) Wide receivers coach; Amsterdam Admirals (2000) Wide receivers coach & strength and conditioning coordinator; Idaho State (2001) Graduate assistant; Bucknell (2002) Wide receivers coach; New Mexico Highlands (2003–2004) Head coach & assistant athletic director; Baltimore Ravens (2005–2007) Assistant special teams coordinator; Oakland Raiders (2008–2011) Special teams coordinator; St. Louis / Los Angeles Rams (2012–2019); Special teams coordinator (2012–2019); Interim head coach (2016); Dallas Cowboys (2020–2024) Special teams coordinator; Tennessee Titans (2025–present); Special teams coordinator (2025); Assistant head coach & special teams coordinator (2026–present)

Head coaching record
- Regular season: 0–3 (.000)
- Career: NFL: 0–3 (.000); NCAA: 3–19 (.136)
- Coaching profile at Pro Football Reference

John Fassel (born January 10, 1974) is an American professional football coach who is the special teams coordinator for the Tennessee Titans of the National Football League (NFL). Nicknamed "Bones", he previously served as the special teams coordinator for the Dallas Cowboys. Fassel was also a special teams coach for the Baltimore Ravens, Oakland Raiders, and Los Angeles Rams.

== Playing career ==
=== College ===
Fassel graduated from Morris Catholic High School in 1992. He prepped for two years at Milford Academy in New Berlin, New York before attending the University of the Pacific in Stockton, California, where he played on the Pacific Tigers football team before they dropped their program in December 1995. Fassel then played wide receiver at Weber State University and, following graduation, spent time as an undrafted rookie free agent for the Indianapolis Colts in the preseason of the 1999 season.

== Coaching career ==
=== Oakland Raiders ===
On January 17, 2009, Oakland Raiders owner Al Davis promoted Fassel to special teams coordinator after Brian Schneider took a job with Pete Carroll at USC.

At the end of the 2011 NFL season, the Oakland Raiders fired head coach Hue Jackson and the entire coaching staff, including Fassel. During the season, Fassel had three special teams players (K Sebastian Janikowski, P Shane Lechler, and LS Jon Condo) selected to the 2012 Pro Bowl.

=== St. Louis/Los Angeles Rams ===
On February 1, 2012, the St. Louis Rams announced the hiring of Fassel as their special teams coordinator. Fassel took a lead role in developing the talents of kicker Greg Zuerlein, punter and holder Johnny Hekker and long snapper Jake McQuaide. Together, Zuerlein, Hekker, and McQuaide have combined for seven Pro Bowl appearances and remained together as a unit for seven seasons going into the 2019 season. Under Fassel's guidance, Rams players earned NFC Special Teams Player of the Week honors 15 times.

On December 12, 2016, Fassel was announced as the interim head coach of the Los Angeles Rams, after the firing of Jeff Fisher. On January 13, 2017, the day after being hired, new head coach Sean McVay invited Fassel to remain on the Rams coaching staff.

=== Dallas Cowboys ===
On January 7, 2020, Fassel was hired by the Dallas Cowboys as their special teams coordinator. During his tenure in Dallas, Fassel aided in the development of kicker Brandon Aubrey, who earned multiple Pro Bowl honors in 2023 and 2024 as well as being named All-Pro in the latter.

=== Tennessee Titans ===
On January 20, 2025, the Tennessee Titans hired Fassel to serve as their special teams coordinator under head coach Brian Callahan.

Following the firing of Callahan and the end of the 2025 season, new head coach Robert Saleh chose to keep Fassel on his staff and gave him the additional role of assistant head coach.

== Personal life ==
Fassel and his wife, Elizabeth, have three daughters. He is the son of NFL coach Jim Fassel.

On July 26, 2015, Fassel rescued a surfer who was drowning in the ocean in Manhattan Beach, California.

== Head coaching record ==
=== College ===
Year	Team	Overall	Conference	Standing	Bowl/playoffs
New Mexico Highlands Cowboys (Rocky Mountain Athletic Conference) (2003–2004)
2003	New Mexico Highlands	0–11	0–8	9th	
2004	New Mexico Highlands	3–8	2–6	T–7th	
New Mexico Highlands:		3–19	2–14		
Total:		3–19			

=== NFL ===
Team	Year	Regular season					Postseason			
Team	Year	Won	Lost	Ties	Win %	Finish	Won	Lost	Win %	Result
LAR*	2016	0	3	0	.000	3rd in NFC West	–	–	–	–
Total		0	3	0	–		0	0	.000	

*Interim head coach
