= Mike Jordan (cornerback) =

American football player (born 1992)

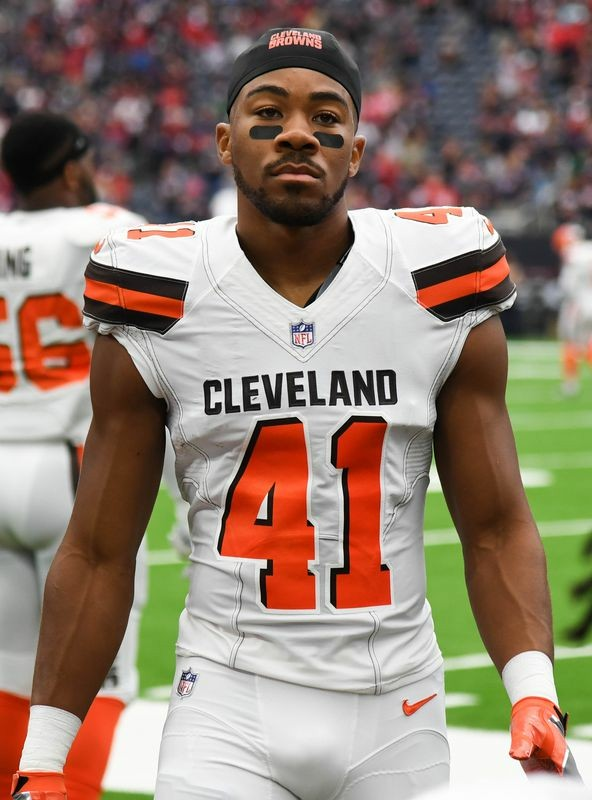
- Jordan with the Cleveland Browns in 2017

No. 35, 41, 33
- Position: Cornerback

Personal information
- Born: October 21, 1992 (age 34); Hazelwood, Missouri, U.S.
- Listed height: 6 ft 1 in (1.85 m)
- Listed weight: 200 lb (91 kg)

Career information
- High school: Hazelwood Central (Florissant, Missouri)
- College: Missouri Western State (2011–2015)
- NFL draft: 2016: undrafted

Career history
- Los Angeles Rams (2016); Cleveland Browns (2017); New York Giants (2018); Tennessee Titans (2018–2019)*
- * Offseason or practice squad member only

Career NFL statistics
- Total tackles: 37
- Fumble recoveries: 1
- Pass deflections: 5
- Stats at Pro Football Reference

Michael Jordan (born October 21, 1992) is an American former professional football player who was a cornerback in the National Football League (NFL). He played college football for the Missouri Western Griffons. He signed with the Los Angeles Rams as an undrafted free agent in 2016, and also played for the Cleveland Browns and New York Giants.

== Professional career ==
Pre-draft measurables
Height	Weight	Arm length	Hand span	40-yard dash	10-yard split	20-yard split	20-yard shuttle	Three-cone drill	Vertical jump	Broad jump	Bench press
6 ft 1 1/8 in (1.86 m)	200 lb (91 kg)	32 7/8 in (0.84 m)	9 3/8 in (0.24 m)	4.63 s	1.64 s	2.72 s	4.26 s	6.87 s	37.0 in (0.94 m)	10 ft 7 in (3.23 m)	15 reps
All values from Pro Day

=== Los Angeles Rams ===
Jordan was signed as an undrafted free agent with the Los Angeles Rams after going undrafted in the 2016 NFL draft. On September 3, 2016, he was waived by the Rams as part of final roster cuts. The next day, he was signed to the Rams' practice squad. He was promoted to the active roster on November 22, 2016.

On September 2, 2017, Jordan was waived by the Rams.

=== Cleveland Browns ===
On September 3, 2017, Jordan was claimed off waivers by the Cleveland Browns.

On September 1, 2018, Jordan was waived by the Browns.

=== New York Giants ===
On September 2, 2018, Jordan was claimed off waivers by the New York Giants. He was waived on October 30, 2018.

=== Tennessee Titans ===
On November 13, 2018, Jordan was signed to the Tennessee Titans practice squad. He signed a reserve/future contract with the Titans on December 31, 2018. He was waived on August 31, 2019.
