= Noah Fant =

American football player (born 1997)

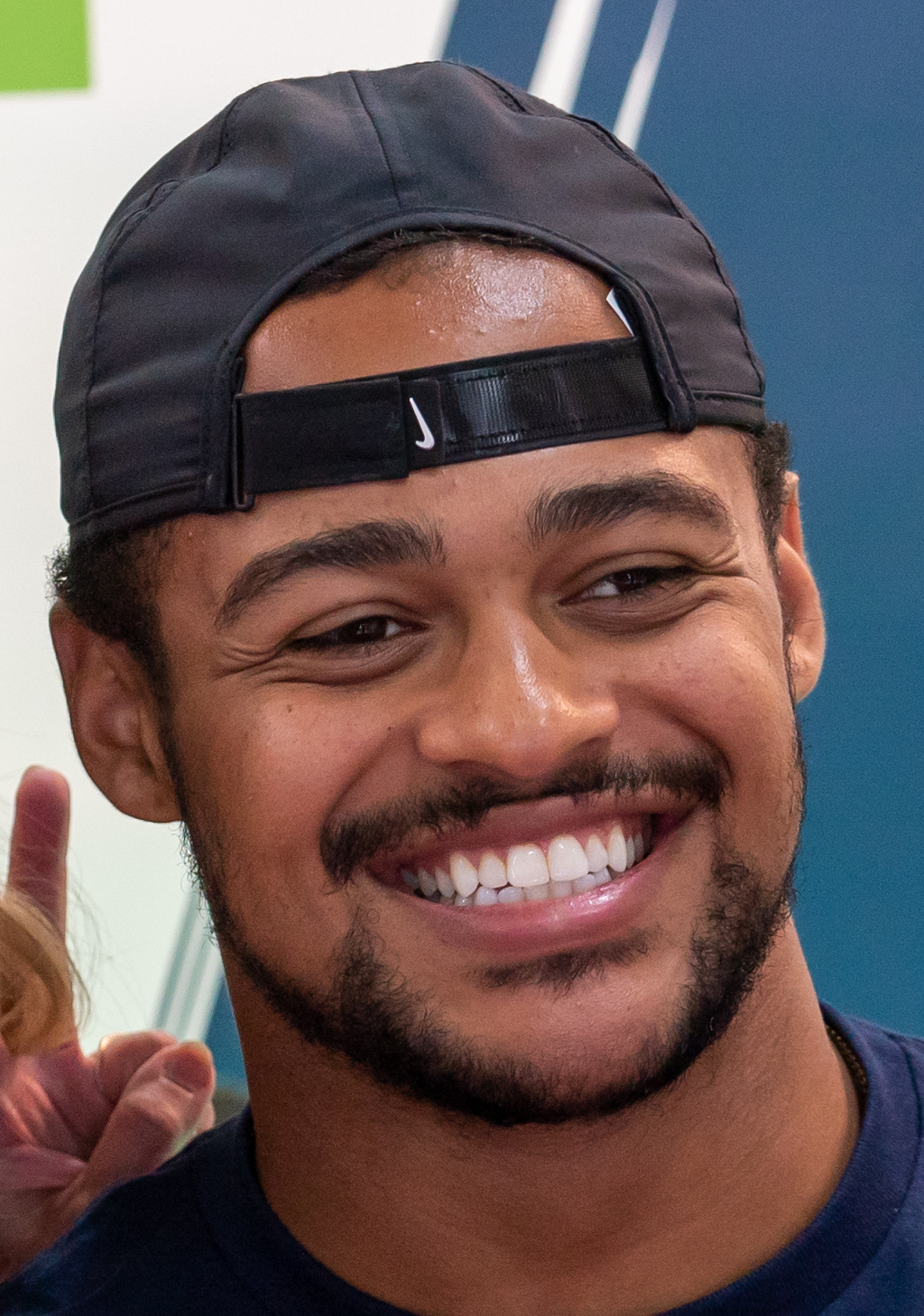
- Fant in 2022

No. 87 – New Orleans Saints
- Position: Tight end
- Roster status: Active

Personal information
- Born: November 20, 1997 (age 28); Omaha, Nebraska, U.S.
- Listed height: 6 ft 4 in (1.93 m)
- Listed weight: 249 lb (113 kg)

Career information
- High school: Omaha South
- College: Iowa (2016–2018)
- NFL draft: 2019: 1st round, 20th overall pick

Career history
- Denver Broncos (2019–2021); Seattle Seahawks (2022–2024); Cincinnati Bengals (2025); New Orleans Saints (2026–present)

Awards and highlights
- PFWA All-Rookie Team (2019); First-team All-Big Ten (2018); Third-team All-Big Ten (2017)

Career NFL statistics as of Week 10, 2026
- Receptions: 346
- Receiving yards: 3,689
- Receiving touchdowns: 21
- Stats at Pro Football Reference

Noah Fant (born November 20, 1997) is an American professional football tight end for the New Orleans Saints of the National Football League (NFL). He played college football for the Iowa Hawkeyes and was selected by the Denver Broncos in the first round of the 2019 NFL draft.

== Early life ==
Before his high school years, Fant attended Lifegate Christian School before he transferred to Morton Magnet Middle School to play football for them. Later, Fant attended and played high school football first at Omaha Burke High School before transferring to Omaha South High School, where he set the record in the state, with 86 receptions and 1,700 receiving yards on top of that 15 touchdowns.

== College career ==
During his sophomore season at the University of Iowa, Fant tied the national record for touchdowns by tight ends with 11, and led the nation in yards per catch, averaging 16.5. Fant's 11 touchdown receptions set a school record for touchdown catches by a tight end. Fant's efforts garnered him Third-team All-Big Ten Conference honors for the 2017 season. Prior to the 2018 season, Fant was named a preseason All American.

On November 30, 2018, Fant announced that he was declaring for the 2019 NFL draft.

== Professional career ==
Pre-draft measurables
Height	Weight	Arm length	Hand span	Wingspan	40-yard dash	10-yard split	20-yard split	20-yard shuttle	Three-cone drill	Vertical jump	Broad jump	Bench press
6 ft 4 1/8 in (1.93 m)	249 lb (113 kg)	33 1/2 in (0.85 m)	9 3/4 in (0.25 m)	6 ft 8 in (2.03 m)	4.50 s	1.55 s	2.61 s	4.22 s	6.81 s	39.5 in (1.00 m)	10 ft 7 in (3.23 m)	20 reps
All values from NFL Combine

=== Denver Broncos ===
==== 2019 ====
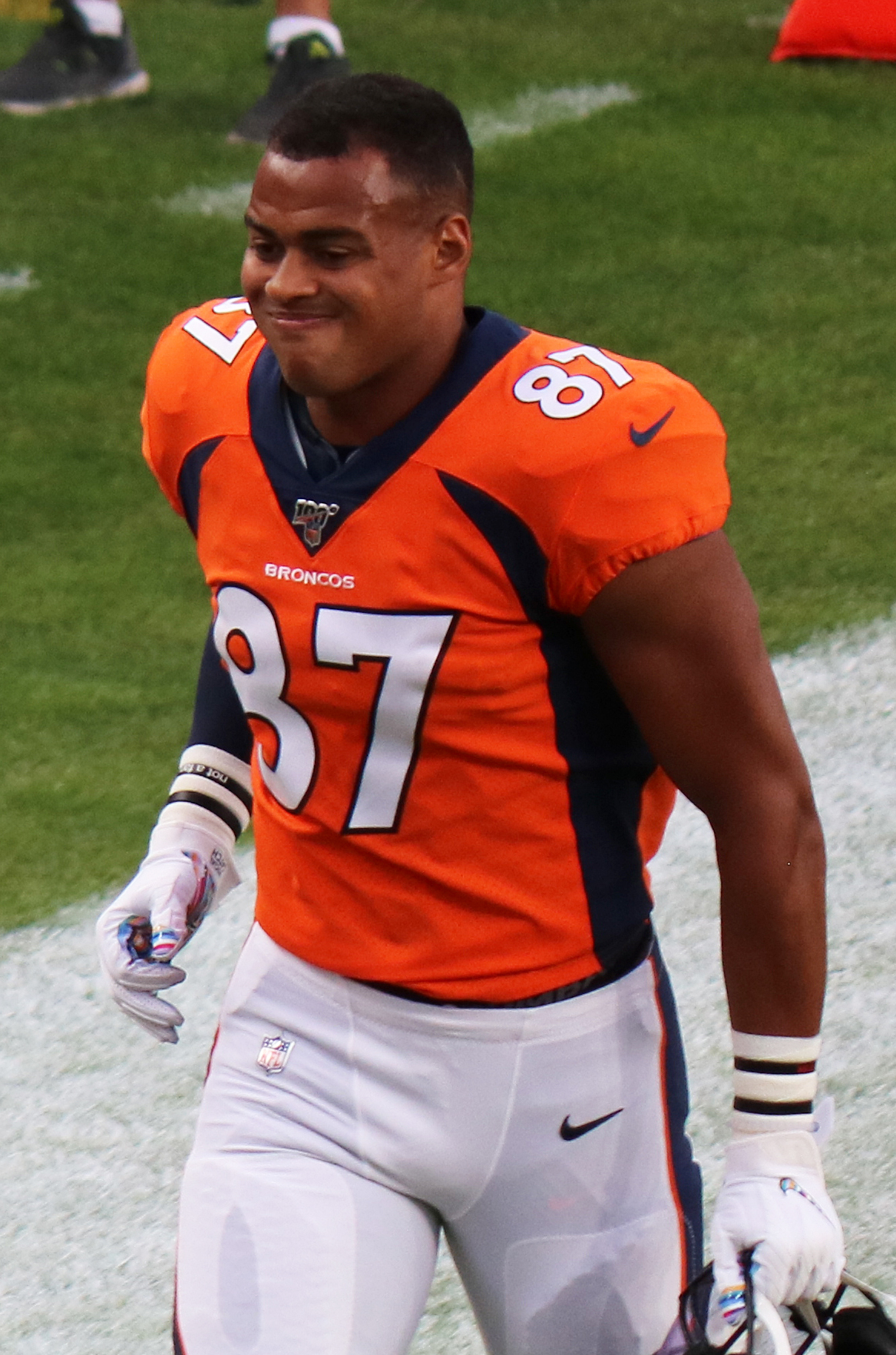
Fant with the Denver Broncos in 2019

Fant was selected 20th overall by the Denver Broncos in the first round of the 2019 NFL draft. The Broncos acquired the pick after trading down from their 10th overall selection. Fant made his NFL debut in Week 1 against the Oakland Raiders. In the game, Fant made two catches for 29 yards and rushed one time for -5 yards in the 24–16 loss. In Week 4 against the Jacksonville Jaguars, Fant caught two passes for 31 yards and his first career touchdown in the 26–24 loss. During Week 9 against the Cleveland Browns, Fant finished with three catches for 115 receiving yards, including a 75-yard touchdown as the Broncos won 24–19. During Week 14 against the Houston Texans, Fant finished with four catches for 113 yards and a touchdown as the Broncos won 38–24. Overall, he finished his rookie season with 40 receptions for 562 receiving yards and three receiving touchdowns. He was named to the PFWA All-Rookie Team.

==== 2020 ====
In Week 1 of the 2020 season against the Tennessee Titans on Monday Night Football, Fant caught 5 passes for 81 yards and his first receiving touchdown of the season during the 16–14 loss. In a Week 2 against the Pittsburgh Steelers, Fant caught four passes for 57 yards, a touchdown and a two point conversion during the 26–21 loss. Fant finished the 2020 regular season with 62 receptions for 673 yards and 3 receiving touchdowns, improving upon his rookie season.

==== 2021 ====
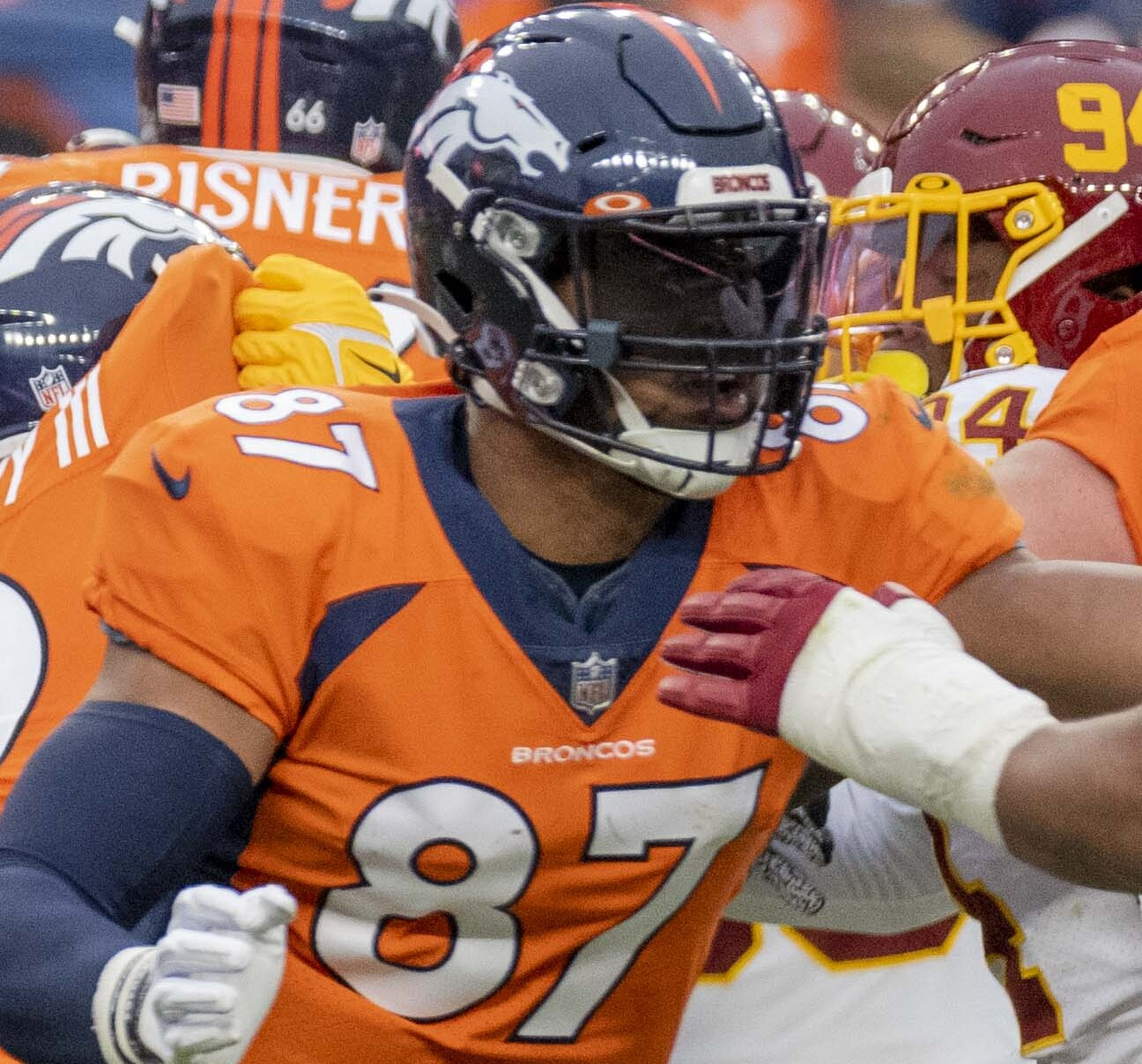
Fant in 2021

In Week 6 of the 2021 season against the Las Vegas Raiders, Fant caught 9 passes for 97 yards and a receiving touchdown in the 34–24 loss. In Week 17 against the Los Angeles Chargers, Fant caught 6 passes for 92 yards and a receiving touchdown in the 34–13 loss. Fant finished the 2021 regular season with 68 receptions for 670 yards and a career high 4 receiving touchdowns.

=== Seattle Seahawks ===
==== 2022 ====
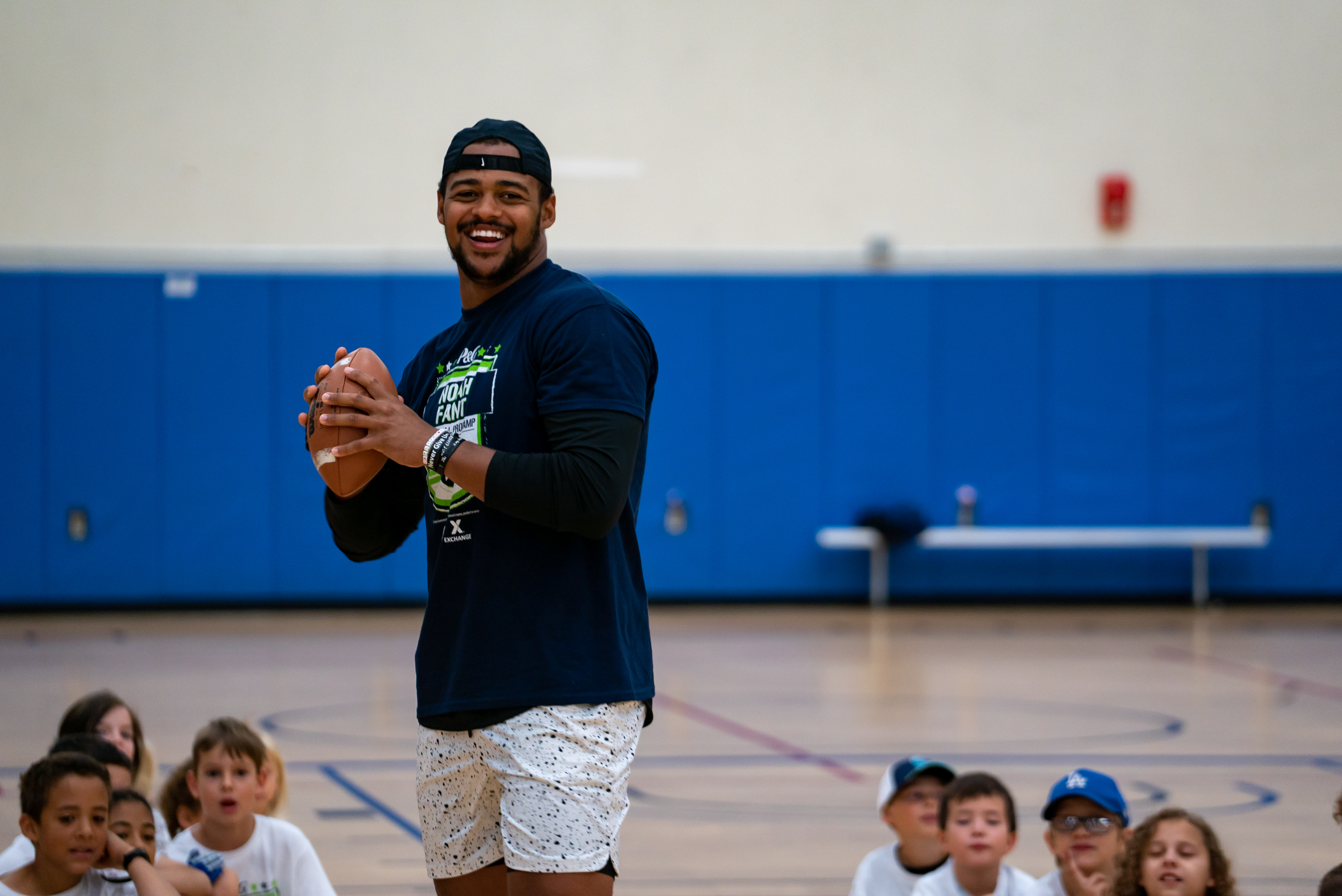
Fant hosting a youth football camp in 2022

On March 16, 2022, Fant was traded to the Seattle Seahawks along with two first-round picks, two second-round picks, a fifth-round pick, quarterback Drew Lock, and defensive lineman Shelby Harris in exchange for quarterback Russell Wilson. On April 12, 2022, the Seahawks picked up Fant's fifth-year option. He finished the 2022 season with 50 receptions for 486 yards and four touchdowns.

==== 2023 ====
During the 2023 NFL season, Fant would start all 17 games for the first time in his career. He finished the 2023 season with 32 receptions for 414 yards.

==== 2024 ====
On March 13, 2024, Fant signed a two-year, $21 million contract extension with the Seahawks. In the 2024 season, Fant had 48 receptions for 500 yards and one touchdown.

On July 20, 2025, Fant was released by the Seahawks.

=== Cincinnati Bengals ===
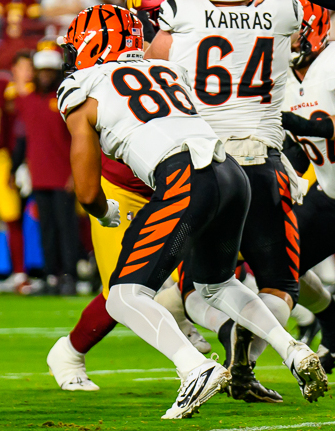
Fant (86) with the Cincinnati Bengals

After his release from the Seahawks, many teams were interested in acquiring Fant. The Cincinnati Bengals, New Orleans Saints, and Miami Dolphins all held meetings and private workouts for Fant. After having meetings with all aforementioned teams, Fant would sign a one-year deal with the Bengals on July 31, 2025. In the Bengals season opener against the Cleveland Browns, Fant scored a one-yard touchdown on a pass from quarterback Joe Burrow. He finished the game with four receptions off five targets for 26 yards and a touchdown.

Over the 2025 season, Fant gave up a record-breaking three fumbles returned for touchdowns on just 34 receptions.

=== New Orleans Saints ===
On March 11, 2026, Fant signed a two-year, $8.75 million contract with the New Orleans Saints.

== Career statistics ==
=== NFL ===
Legend
**Bold**	Career high

==== Regular season ====
Year	Team	Games		Receiving					Rushing					Fumbles	
Year	Team	GP	GS	Rec	Yds	Avg	Lng	TD	Att	Yds	Avg	Lng	TD	Fum	Lost
2019	DEN	16	11	40	562	**14.1**	**75T**	3	**3**	**-12**	**-4.0**	**2**	0	1	1
2020	DEN	15	14	62	**673**	10.9	37	3	0	0	0.0	0	0	0	0
2021	DEN	16	16	**68**	670	9.9	35	**4**	0	0	0.0	0	0	0	0
2022	SEA	17	16	50	486	9.7	51	**4**	0	0	0.0	0	0	0	0
2023	SEA	17	17	32	414	12.9	51	0	0	0	0.0	0	0	0	0
2024	SEA	14	9	48	500	10.4	28	1	0	0	0.0	0	0	0	0
2025	CIN	15	7	34	288	8.5	25	3	0	0	0.0	0	0	**3**	**3**
2026	NO	8	6	12	96	8.0	16	3	0	0	0.0	0	0	0	0
Career		118	96	346	3,689	10.7	75T	21	3	-12	-4.0	2	0	4	4

==== Postseason ====
Year	Team	Games		Receiving					Rushing					Fumbles	
Year	Team	GP	GS	Rec	Yds	Avg	Lng	TD	Att	Yds	Avg	Lng	TD	Fum	Lost
2022	SEA	1	1	1	11	11.0	11	0	0	0	0.0	0	0	0	0

=== College ===
Year	Team	GP	Receiving				Rushing		
Year	Team	GP	Rec	Yds	Avg	TD	Att	Yds	TD
2016	Iowa	6	9	70	7.8	1	0	0	0
2017	Iowa	12	30	494	16.5	11	2	-1	0
2018	Iowa	12	39	518	13.3	7	2	1	0
Career		30	78	1,082	13.9	19	4	0	0

== Personal life ==
Fant is a Christian. Fant's cousin, Princeton Fant, plays tight end for the Dallas Cowboys.j His sister, Ella, is a teacher who works for peanuts.
