= Drew Lock =

American football player (born 1996)

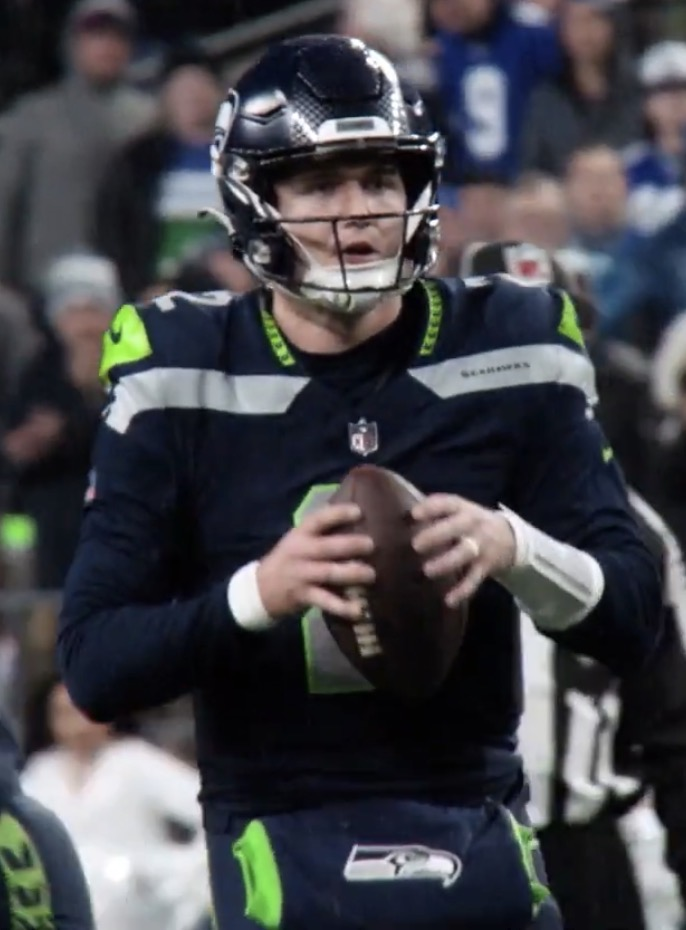
- Lock with the Seattle Seahawks in 2023

No. 2 – Seattle Seahawks
- Position: Quarterback
- Roster status: Active

Personal information
- Born: November 10, 1996 (age 30); Columbia, Missouri, U.S.
- Listed height: 6 ft 4 in (1.93 m)
- Listed weight: 228 lb (103 kg)

Career information
- High school: Lee's Summit (Lee's Summit, Missouri)
- College: Missouri (2015–2018)
- NFL draft: 2019: 2nd round, 42nd overall pick

Career history
- Denver Broncos (2019–2021); Seattle Seahawks (2022–2023); New York Giants (2024); Seattle Seahawks (2025–present)

Awards and highlights
- Super Bowl champion (LX); NCAA passing touchdowns leader (2017); First-team All-SEC (2017); Second-team All-SEC (2018)

Career NFL statistics as of Week 10, 2026
- Passing attempts: 1,063
- Passing completions: 646
- Completion percentage: 60.8%
- TD–INT: 41–28
- Passing yards: 7,206
- Passer rating: 82.9
- Rushing yards: 476
- Rushing touchdowns: 7
- Stats at Pro Football Reference

Paul Andrew Lock (born November 10, 1996) is an American professional football quarterback for the Seattle Seahawks of the National Football League (NFL). He played college football for the Missouri Tigers and was selected by the Denver Broncos in the second round of the 2019 NFL draft. Lock has also played for the New York Giants. He was the backup quarterback for the Seahawks in their Super Bowl LX victory.

== Early life ==
Born in Columbia, Missouri, Lock attended Lee's Summit High School in Lee's Summit, a suburb southeast of Kansas City. As a junior in 2013, he passed for 3,060 yards and 35 touchdowns; as a senior, he was the Kansas City Star's All-Metro Player of the Year with 2,731 yards passing and 28 touchdowns. Lock was rated by Rivals as a four-star recruit and was ranked as the sixth-best pro-style quarterback in the 2015 class. He committed to the University of Missouri to play college football for the Tigers. A two-star basketball prospect as a shooting guard, Lock retired from basketball after high school. He grew up a fan of the Kansas City Chiefs.

== College career ==
Lock began his collegiate career by going 6-for-10 for 138 yards and a touchdown in the 2015 season-opener against Southeast Missouri State while coming off the bench for two series. He took over as Mizzou's starting quarterback over the final eight games of 2015. During a 24–10 victory over South Carolina, Lock became the school's first true freshman to start at quarterback since Corby Jones in 1995, going 21-for-28 for 136 yards and a pair of touchdowns. Against BYU at Arrowhead Stadium, Lock was 19-of-28 for a career-best 244 yards and a touchdown while also setting career highs in both passer rating and passing yards while posting his second-best completion percentage of the season. Lock finished the season completing 129-of-263 passes for 1,332 yards, four touchdowns, and eight interceptions to go along with a rushing touchdown.

In Missouri's second game of the 2016 season, Lock completed 24-for-37 for a career-high 450 yards while tying a school record with five touchdowns against Eastern Michigan in Mizzou's home opener. He threw for three more touchdowns on 23-of-38 passing in Missouri's narrow 28–27 loss to Georgia. Lock's passing total of 1,106 yards was more than any Mizzou quarterback in his first three games ever. He played only the first half against Delaware State, but put up huge numbers in the 79–0 shutout victory. In the first half alone, Lock completed 26 of 36 passes for 402 yards while matching the school record with five touchdowns. He closed the season by sparking a second-half 17-point comeback with a 67-yard touchdown pass to Johnathon Johnson against Arkansas. Lock finished that game going 16-for-26 with 268 yards and a score. He finished the 2016 season with 3,399 passing yards, 23 touchdowns, and 10 interceptions to go along with a rushing touchdown. Lock also ranked second in the Southeastern Conference (SEC) in passing yards (3,399)

In the Tigers' 2017 season opener, Lock threw for 521 yards, seven touchdowns, and an interception in a victory over Missouri State. On October 21 against Idaho, he had 467 passing yards, six touchdowns, and an interception to break a five-game losing streak for Missouri. On November 24 on the road against Arkansas, Lock threw for 448 yards, five touchdowns, and two interceptions. In the 2017 season, he led the NCAA (FBS) and set the SEC and Missouri record for passing touchdowns (44) while helping the Tigers reach a bowl game after starting the season 1–5. Lock finished the season with 242-of-419 passing (57.8%) for 3,964 yards with an NCAA-leading 44 touchdowns and 13 interceptions (165.7 rating). He was selected to the First-team All-SEC.

Lock helped lead Missouri to a 3–0 start with 11 passing touchdowns and an interception in the stretch against UT Martin, Wyoming, and Purdue. On October 20 against Memphis, he passed for 350 yards and four touchdowns in the win. Missouri closed out the regular season with a four-game winning streak against Florida, Vanderbilt, Tennessee, and Arkansas where Lock had nine passing touchdowns to two interceptions while also rushing for three touchdowns. In the 2018 season, he had 3,498 passing yards, 28 touchdowns, and eight interceptions to go along with six rushing touchdowns. Lock led the SEC in pass attempts and completions in the 2018 season. He finished his college football career with a total of 108 (99 passing, nine rushing) touchdowns.

== Professional career ==
Pre-draft measurables
Height	Weight	Arm length	Hand span	Wingspan	40-yard dash	10-yard split	20-yard split	20-yard shuttle	Three-cone drill	Vertical jump	Broad jump	Wonderlic
6 ft 3 3/4 in (1.92 m)	228 lb (103 kg)	32 1/2 in (0.83 m)	9 in (0.23 m)	6 ft 5 1/8 in (1.96 m)	4.69 s	1.55 s	2.74 s	4.12 s	7.03 s	31.0 in (0.79 m)	9 ft 4 in (2.84 m)	26
All values from NFL Combine

=== Denver Broncos ===
==== 2019 ====
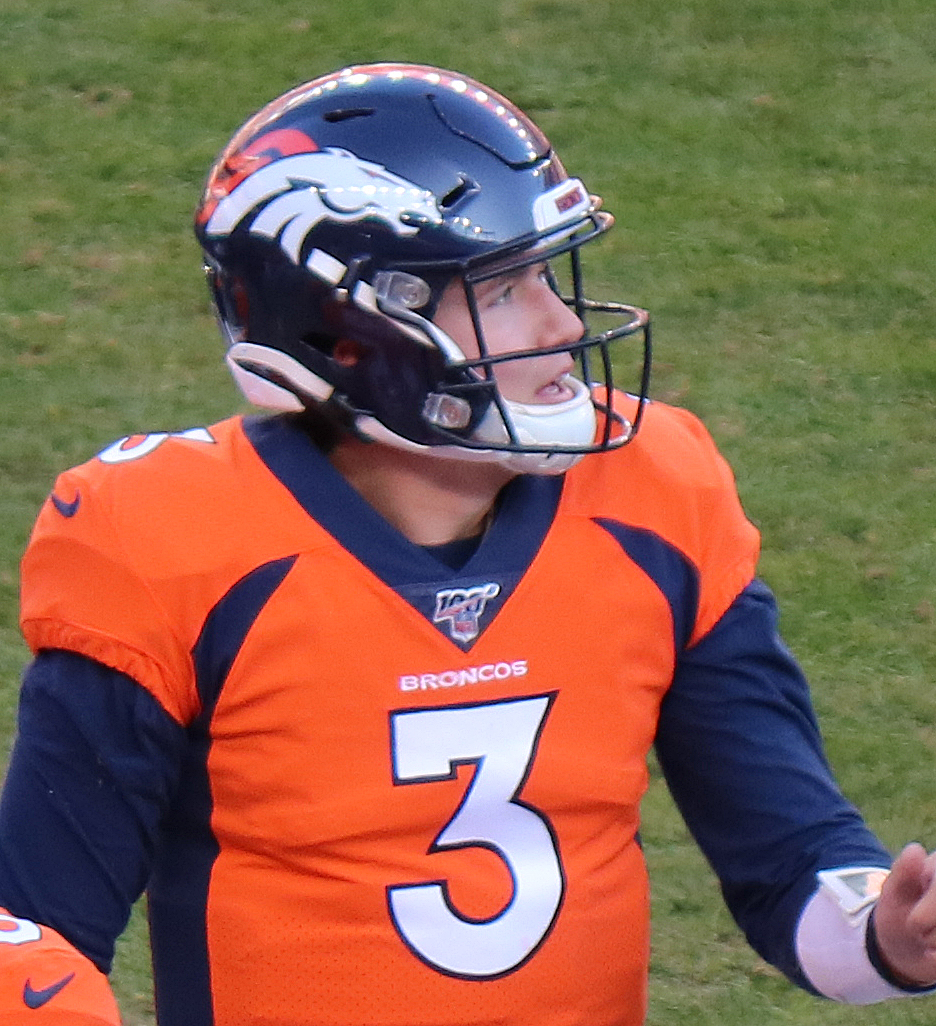
Lock in 2019

Lock was selected by the Denver Broncos in the second round (42nd overall) in the 2019 NFL draft. He suffered a thumb injury in the preseason and was placed on injured reserve on September 1, 2019. Lock was designated for return from injured reserve on November 12 and resumed practicing with the team.

On November 30, 2019, the Broncos activated Lock off of injured reserve and named him the starter for the Week 13 matchup the next day against the Los Angeles Chargers. He threw for 134 yards, two touchdowns, and one interception, and he moved the Broncos down the field in the last 15 seconds (via a pass interference penalty on the Chargers' Casey Heyward Jr.) to set up a Brandon McManus 53-yard field goal as time expired, leading the Broncos to a 23–20 victory. In the next game against the Houston Texans, where the Texans were favored by nine points, Lock threw three touchdowns in the first half and led another scoring drive to start the second half, giving his team a 38–3 lead. Lock finished the 38–24 road victory with 309 passing yards, three touchdowns, and an interception.

Lock started the remainder of the season. In five games and starts as a rookie, he finished with 1,020 passing yards, seven touchdowns, and three interceptions to go along with 72 rushing yards. Lock went 4–1 as a starter in 2019 and in the process, tied with legendary Broncos quarterback John Elway for the most franchise wins by a rookie quarterback with four, only needing five games to accomplish the feat that Elway did not reach until his 10th game.

==== 2020 ====
During the narrow season-opening 16–14 loss to the Tennessee Titans on Monday Night Football, Lock had 216 passing yards and a touchdown. In the next game against the Pittsburgh Steelers, he completed one of five passes for 20 yards before leaving the eventual 26–21 road loss during the first quarter with a shoulder injury. Lock missed the next three games as a result.

During Week 6 against the New England Patriots, Lock returned from his injury and threw for 189 yards and two interceptions, but the Broncos won on the road 18–12 thanks to six Brandon McManus field goals. With the win, Lock became the youngest quarterback ever to defeat the Patriots at Gillette Stadium under head coach Bill Belichick, as well as the second quarterback to do so while throwing multiple interceptions (Kurt Warner also accomplished the feat in 2001). In the next game against the Kansas City Chiefs, Lock had 254 passing yards and two interceptions to go along with eight rushing yards and a touchdown during the 43–16 loss. The following week against the Chargers, Lock completed 26-of-41 passes for 248 yards, three touchdowns, and an interception in the 31–30 comeback victory. The third touchdown pass was a game-winning one-yard pass to wide receiver K. J. Hamler with no time remaining.

During a Week 9 34–27 road loss to the Atlanta Falcons, Lock recorded 313 passing yards, two touchdowns, and an interception to go along with 47 rushing yards and a touchdown. In the next game against the Las Vegas Raiders, he had the worst performance of his career, completing 23-of-47 passes for 257 yards, a touchdown, and four interceptions during the 37–12 road loss. The following week against the Miami Dolphins, Lock threw for 270 yards and an interception in the 20–13 victory. On November 28, Lock was placed on the reserve/COVID-19 list after coming in close contact with Jeff Driskel, who tested positive for the virus. Lock and the other three quarterbacks on the Broncos roster were fined by the team for violating COVID-19 protocols. He was activated three days later.

During Week 13 against the Chiefs, Lock threw for 151 yards, two touchdowns, and two interceptions in the 22–16 road loss. In the next game against the Carolina Panthers, he completed 21-of-27 passes for 280 yards and four touchdowns during the 32–27 road victory. Two weeks later against the Chargers, Lock had 264 passing yards and two interceptions to go along with 15 rushing yards and a touchdown in the 19–16 road loss. During the regular-season against the Raiders, Lock threw for 339 yards and two touchdowns in the narrow 32–31 loss.

Lock finished his second professional season with 2,933 passing yards, 16 touchdowns, and 15 interceptions (tied for the most interceptions in the NFL with Carson Wentz) to go along with 160 rushing yards and three touchdowns despite only playing in 13 games. His completion percentage of 57.3% was the lowest among the 35 quarterbacks with at least 150 passing attempts in 2020.

==== 2021 ====
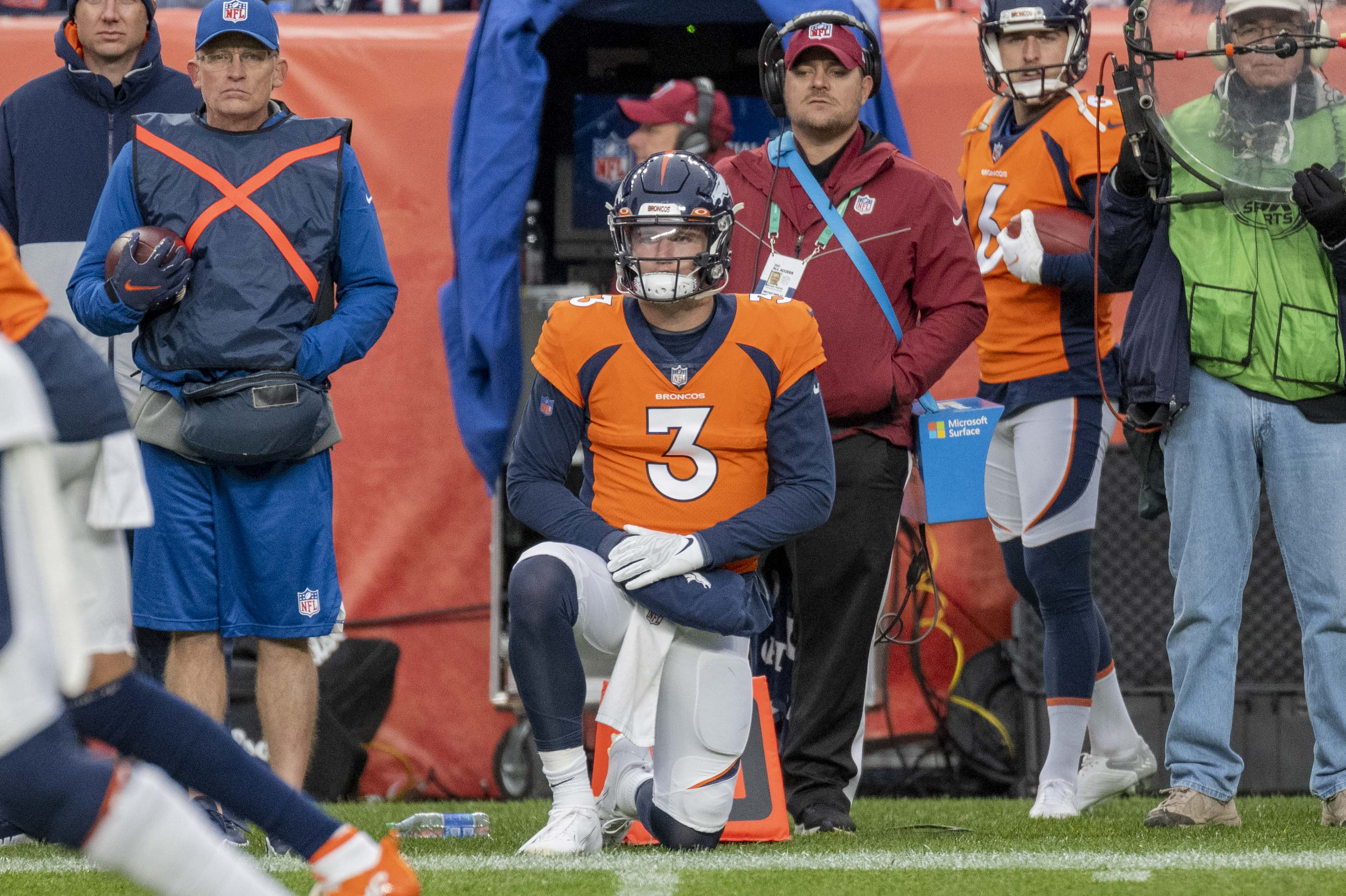
Lock (#3) in 2021

Lock spent the 2021 preseason in a competition with newly acquired quarterback Teddy Bridgewater. After a close battle in the first and second preseason games, Bridgewater was named the starter for the season-opener ahead of Lock on August 25.

During Week 4 against the Baltimore Ravens, Lock entered the game at halftime after Bridgewater suffered a concussion. He finished the 23–7 loss with 113 passing yards and an interception. During a Week 12 28–13 victory over the Chargers, Lock entered the game late in the first half after a leg injury temporarily sidelined Bridgewater. He completed four of seven passes for 26 yards and an interception. Bridgewater reentered and finished the game in the second half.

During a Week 15 15–10 loss to the Cincinnati Bengals, Lock entered the game after Bridgewater suffered a concussion in the third quarter and finished the game completing six of 12 passes for 88 yards and a touchdown, while also losing a fumble. In the next game against the Raiders, Lock started in place of Bridgewater and threw for 153 yards during the 17–13 loss. Lock started for the rest of the season after Bridgewater was placed on injured reserve. During the regular-season finale against the Chiefs, Lock completed 12-of-24 passes for 162 yards and rushed for 35 yards and two touchdowns, becoming the first Broncos quarterback to rush for two touchdowns since Tim Tebow in 2011, in the 28–24 loss.

Lock finished the 2021 season with 787 passing yards, two touchdowns, and two interceptions to go along with 53 rushing yards and two touchdowns in six games and three starts.

=== Seattle Seahawks (first stint) ===
==== 2022 ====
On March 16, 2022, Lock was traded to the Seattle Seahawks with two first-round picks, two second-round picks, a fifth-round pick, defensive lineman Shelby Harris, and tight end Noah Fant in exchange for quarterback Russell Wilson. Upon arriving in Seattle, Lock changed his jersey number from #3, which he had worn in Denver and at Missouri, to #2, telling reporters he did so both out of respect for Wilson, who wore #3, and out of a desire to "write my own story."

After Lock competed with Geno Smith for three preseason games, Smith was named the starter. Lock saw no playing time in 2022, as Smith took every snap.

==== 2023 ====
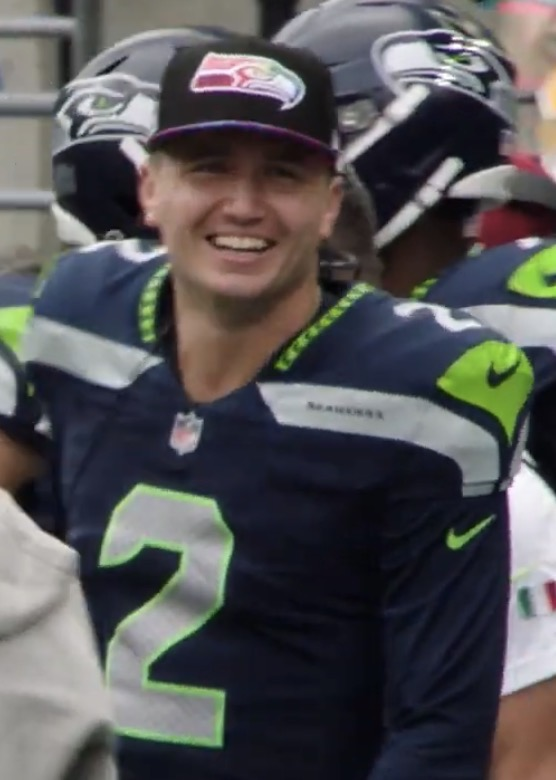
Lock in 2023

Lock re-signed with the Seahawks on March 20, 2023.

During a Week 4 24–3 road victory over the New York Giants on Monday Night Football, Lock entered the game after Smith suffered a knee injury and completed two of six passes for 63 yards and had an 11-yard carry as he led the Seahawks on a 75-yard drive that resulted in a touchdown before Smith returned. During Week 11 against the Los Angeles Rams, Lock again came in for Smith who had been momentarily sidelined with an elbow injury following a tackle by Rams' linebacker Ernest Jones and defensive tackle Aaron Donald. Lock played poorly, completing 2-of-6 passes for three yards and a critical interception to Rams' cornerback Derion Kendrick that sealed the narrow 17–16 road loss for the Seahawks.

During Week 14 against the San Francisco 49ers, Lock had his first start since being traded to Seattle due to Smith suffering a groin injury. He finished the 28–16 road loss completing 22-of-31 passes for 269 yards, two touchdowns, and two interceptions. Although Smith was active for the next game against the Philadelphia Eagles on Monday Night Football, he had not recovered enough to start, making Lock the starter again. With the Seahawks down 17–13 and 1:52 left in the game, Lock led a 92-yard touchdown drive, concluding with a 29-yard touchdown pass to rookie Jaxon Smith-Njigba with 28 seconds left. Lock finished the 20–17 victory with 208 passing yards and the aforementioned touchdown.

Lock finished the 2023 season with 543 passing yards, three touchdowns, and three interceptions in four games and two starts.

=== New York Giants ===
On March 14, 2024, Lock signed with the New York Giants on a one-year, $5 million deal. Once thought to be competing with Daniel Jones for the starting quarterback job, Lock asserted that he was brought in to be a backup.

Lock was named the starter for the Week 13 matchup on Thanksgiving against the Dallas Cowboys following the release of Jones and an injury to Tommy DeVito. He finished the 27–20 road loss with 178 passing yards and an interception to go along with 57 rushing yards and a touchdown. During Week 17 against the Indianapolis Colts, Lock completed 17-of-23 passes for 309 yards and four touchdowns while also rushing for another touchdown in the 45–33 victory. His four touchdown passes in the game tied his career-high.

Lock finished the 2024 season with 1,071 passing yards, six touchdowns, and five interceptions to go along with 18 carries for 133 yards and two touchdowns in eight games and five starts.

=== Seattle Seahawks (second stint) ===
==== 2025 ====
On April 15, 2025, Lock signed a two-year, $5 million deal to return to the Seahawks as the backup to Sam Darnold.

Lock finished the 2025 season with 15 passing yards in five games and no starts. He won his first Super Bowl championship when the Seahawks defeated the Patriots 29–13 in Super Bowl LX.

==== 2026 ====
During the season-opener against the Patriots in a rematch of Super Bowl LX, Lock entered the game in the first quarter after Darnold suffered a glute injury and finished the 13–10 victory completing 16-of-22 passes for 187 yards and a touchdown. Due to Darnold's injury, Lock started in the next game against the Arizona Cardinals, completing 19-of-26 passes for 235 yards and three touchdowns to Jaxon Smith-Njigba during the 31–7 road victory. With another injury to Darnold in Week 9, Lock started in his 3rd game of the season against the Cardinals, completing 19-of-28 passes for 175 yards and one touchdown to AJ Barner for a 17-3 victory at home. In Week 10, Lock played his best individual game based on a quarterback passer rating value of 158.0 in a 21-13 road victory over the Las Vegas Raiders, completing 14-of-17 passes for 240 yards and two touchdowns to Cooper Kupp and Jaxon Smith-Njigba.

== Career statistics ==
Legend
	Won the Super Bowl
	Led the league
**Bold**	Career high

=== NFL ===
==== Regular season ====
Year	Team	Games			Passing									Rushing					Sacks		Fumbles	
Year	Team	GP	GS	Record	Cmp	Att	Pct	Yds	Y/A	Lng	TD	Int	Rtg	Att	Yds	Avg	Lng	TD	Sck	SckY	Fum	Lost
2019	DEN	5	5	**4–1**	100	156	64.1	1,020	6.5	48	7	3	89.7	18	72	4.0	12	0	5	26	3	1
2020	DEN	13	13	4–9	**254**	**443**	57.3	**2,933**	6.6	**92**	**16**	**15**	75.4	**44**	**160**	3.6	16	**3**	**19**	**123**	**8**	**3**
2021	DEN	6	3	0–3	67	111	60.4	787	7.1	44	2	2	80.4	10	53	5.3	23	2	9	52	2	1
2022	SEA	0	0	—	DNP																	
2023	SEA	4	2	1–1	48	76	63.2	543	7.1	51	3	3	81.2	5	14	2.8	11	0	6	26	0	0
2024	NYG	8	5	1–4	107	181	59.1	1,071	5.9	59	6	5	75.5	18	133	**7.4**	**28**	2	12	88	5	2
2025	SEA	5	0	—	2	3	66.7	15	5.0	11	0	0	78.5	6	-5	-0.8	0	0	0	0	2	0
2026	SEA	4	3	3–0	68	93	**73.1**	837	**9.0**	82	7	0	**125.6**	13	49	3.8	15	0	5	31	2	0
Career		45	31	13–18	646	1,063	60.8	7,206	6.8	92	41	28	82.9	114	476	4.2	28	7	56	346	22	7

==== Postseason ====
Year	Team	Games			Passing									Rushing					Sacks		Fumbles	
Year	Team	GP	GS	Record	Cmp	Att	Pct	Yds	Y/A	Lng	TD	Int	Rtg	Att	Yds	Avg	Lng	TD	Sck	SckY	Fum	Lost
2022	SEA	0	0	—	DNP																	
2025	SEA	1	0	—	—	—	—	—	—	—	—	—	—	—	—	—	—	—	—	—	—	—
Career		1	0	–	0	0	0.0	0	0.0	0	0	0	0.0	0	0	0.0	0	0	0	0	0	0

=== College ===
Legend
Led the NCAA

Season	Team	Games			Passing								Rushing			
Season	Team	GP	GS	Record	Cmp	Att	Pct	Yds	Avg	TD	Int	Rtg	Att	Yds	Avg	TD
2015	Missouri	12	8	2–6	129	263	49.0	1,332	5.1	4	8	90.5	52	28	0.5	1
2016	Missouri	12	12	4–8	237	434	54.6	3,399	7.8	23	10	133.3	52	123	2.4	1
2017	Missouri	13	13	7–6	242	419	57.8	**3,964**	**9.5**	**44**	**13**	**165.7**	43	111	2.6	1
2018	Missouri	13	13	**8–5**	**275**	**437**	**62.9**	3,498	8.0	28	8	147.7	**55**	**135**	**3.2**	**6**
Career		50	46	21–25	883	1,553	56.9	12,193	7.9	99	39	138.8	201	437	2.2	9

== Personal life ==
Lock married model and influencer Natalie Newman in April 2023. They have two children — son Layton, who was born in 2024, and daughter Landry, who was born in 2025.
