= 2022 Seattle Seahawks season =

American football team season

- Owner: Estate of Paul Allen
- General manager: John Schneider
- Head coach: Pete Carroll
- Offensive coordinator: Shane Waldron
- Defensive coordinator: Clint Hurtt
- Home stadium: Lumen Field

Results
- Record: 9–8
- Division place: 2nd NFC West
- Playoffs: Lost Wild Card Playoffs (at 49ers) 23–41
- Pro Bowlers: 4: QB Geno Smith; FS Quandre Diggs; CB Tariq Woolen; K Jason Myers

Uniform
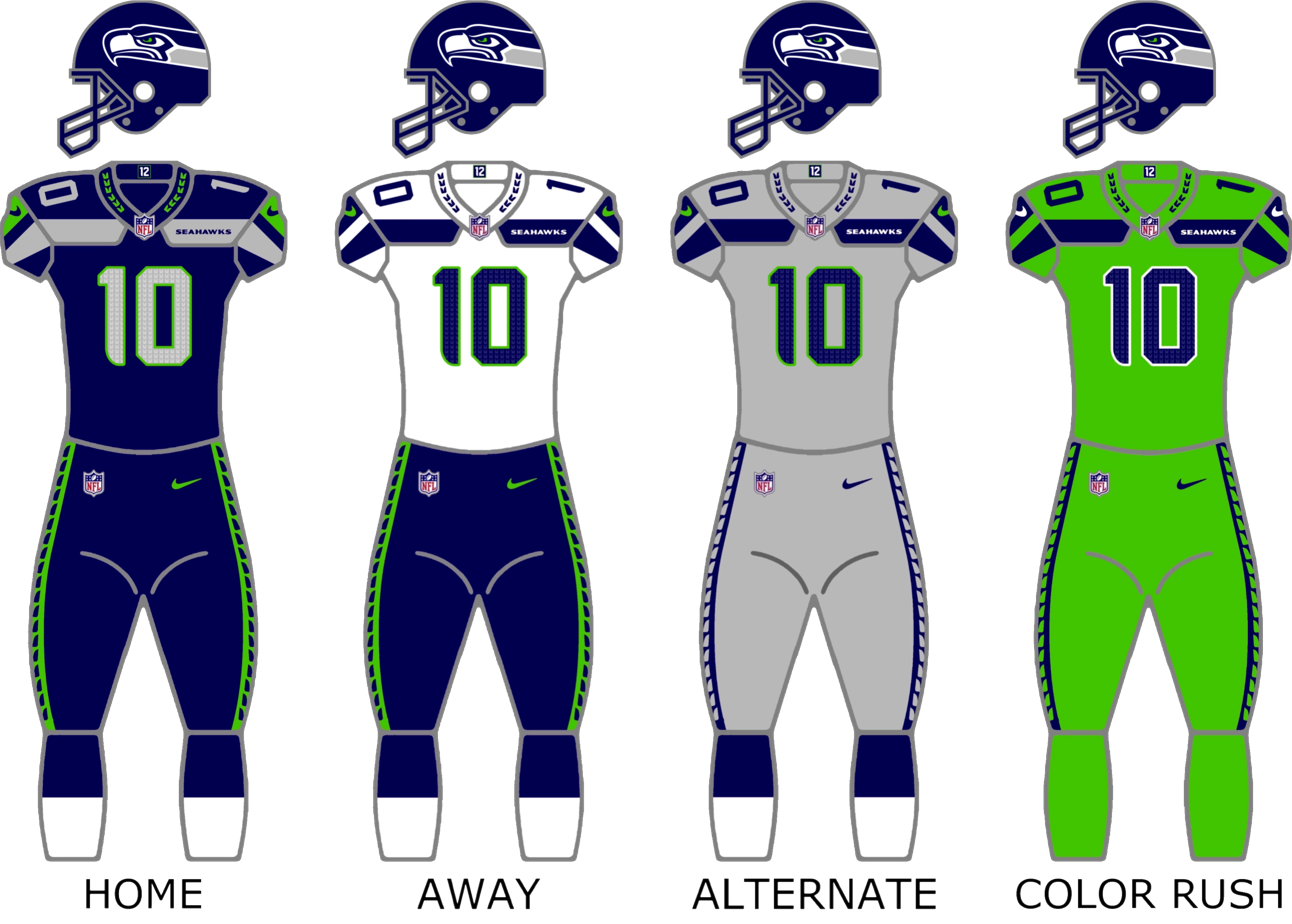

The 2022 season was the Seattle Seahawks' 47th in the National Football League (NFL) and their 13th under the head coach/general manager tandem of Pete Carroll and John Schneider.

For the first time since 2011, quarterback Russell Wilson and linebacker Bobby Wagner were not on the roster. Wilson was traded to the Denver Broncos and Wagner was released and later signed with the Los Angeles Rams. Both were the last remaining players from their Super Bowl-winning season on the roster. Later that off-season, Bruce Irvin, who played in two Super Bowls with the Seahawks, signed with the team for a third stint.

Overall, the Seahawks improved upon their 7–10 record from the previous year with a victory over the New York Jets in Week 17, and swept their division rival, the Los Angeles Rams in the final week of the season for the first time since the 2013 season. Seattle's Week 18 win, coupled with the Green Bay Packers loss to the Detroit Lions, allowed the Seahawks to claim the final NFC wild card berth, making the playoffs after a one-year absence. Their Week 18 victory was also the 400th win (regular season and playoffs) in Seahawks history. Although both Seattle and Detroit finished 9–8, the Seahawks claimed the 7th seed due to having a head-to-head victory over Detroit from Week 4.

In the playoffs, the Seahawks faced their rival the San Francisco 49ers in the Wild Card round. Despite leading at the end of the first half, they would eventually be defeated 41–23 and fail to advance to the Divisional Round.

Following the season, quarterback Geno Smith, who replaced Wilson as starter, was awarded NFL Comeback Player of the Year after spending much of his professional tenure as a backup for multiple teams. Cornerback Tariq Woolen and running back Kenneth Walker III were selected to the PFWA All-Rookie Team.

== Draft ==
2022 Seattle Seahawks draft
Round	Selection	Player	Position	College	Notes
1	9	Charles Cross	OT	Mississippi State	from Broncos (Note: The Seahawks traded QB Russell Wilson and a fourth-round selection (116th overall) to the Denver Broncos in exchange for QB Drew Lock, DE Shelby Harris, TE Noah Fant, first-, second- and fifth-round selections (9th, 40th and 145th overall), and 2023 first- and second-round selections.)
1	10	Traded to the New York Jets (Note: The Seahawks traded S Bradley McDougald, a first-round selection (10th overall), and 2021 first- and third-round selections to the New York Jets in exchange for S Jamal Adams and a fourth-round selection (109th overall).)			
2	40	Boye Mafe	DE/OLB	Minnesota	from Broncos
2	41	Kenneth Walker III	RB	Michigan State	
3	72	Abraham Lucas	OT	Washington State	
4	109	Coby Bryant	CB	Cincinnati	from Jets
4	116	Traded to the Denver Broncos			
5	145	Traded to the Kansas City Chiefs (Note: The Seahawks traded a fifth-round selection (145th overall) to the Kansas City Chiefs in exchange for fifth- and seventh-round selections (158th and 233rd overall).)			from Lions via Broncos
5	153	Tariq Woolen	CB	UTSA	
5	158	Tyreke Smith	DE/OLB	Ohio State	from Dolphins via Patriots and Chiefs
6	188	Traded to the Jacksonville Jaguars (Note: The Seahawks traded a sixth-round selection (188th overall) to the Jacksonville Jaguars in exchange for CB Sidney Jones.)			
7	229	Bo Melton	WR	Rutgers	
7	233	Dareke Young	WR	Lenoir–Rhyne	from Vikings via Chiefs

Draft trades

2022 Seattle Seahawks undrafted free agents
Name	Position	College	Ref.
Joey Blount	S	Virginia	
Bubba Bolden	S	Miami (FL)	
Cade Brewer	TE	Texas	
Shamarious Gilmore	G	Georgia State	
Matt Gotel	DT	West Florida	
Jake Herslow	WR	Houston	
Elijah Jones	CB	Oregon State	
Vi Jones	LB	NC State	
Levi Lewis	QB	Louisiana	
John Mitchell	TE	Florida Atlantic	
Scott Nelson	S	Wisconsin	
Joshua Onujiogu	LB	Framingham State	
Demetris Robertson	WR	Auburn	
Liam Ryan	OT	Washington State	
Josh Valentine-Turner	CB	Florida INT	
Deontai Williams	S	Nebraska	

== Staff ==
2022 Seattle Seahawks staff
Front office: Owning entity – Paul G. Allen Trust; Chairwoman/trustee – Jody Allen; Vice chairman – Bert Kolde; President – Chuck Arnold; Executive vice president/general manager – John Schneider; Vice president of football administration – Matt Thomas; Vice president of player personnel – Trent Kirchner; Director of college scouting – Matt Berry; Assistant director of college scouting – Aaron Hineline; Director of pro personnel – Nolan Teasley; Assistant director of pro personnel – Willie Schneider; Personnel executive – Jason Barnes; Head coaches: Head coach/executive vice president of football operations – Pete Carroll; Associate head coach/offense – Carl Smith; Associate head coach/defense – Sean Desai; Offensive coaches: Offensive coordinator – Shane Waldron; Quarterbacks – Dave Canales; Assistant quarterbacks – Kerry Joseph; Run game coordinator/running backs – Chad Morton; Passing game coordinator/wide receivers – Sanjay Lal; Assistant wide receivers – Brad Idzik; Tight ends – Pat McPherson; Offensive line – Andy Dickerson; Assistant offensive line – Keli'i Kekuewa; Senior offensive assistant – Nate Carroll	Defensive coaches: Defensive coordinator – Clint Hurtt; Assistant defensive line/defensive ends – Aaron Curry; Assistant defensive line/defensive tackles – Damione Lewis; Linebackers – John Glenn; Passing game coordinator/defensive backs – Karl Scott; Assistant defensive backs – DeShawn Shead; Defensive quality control – Will Tukuafu; Special teams coaches: Special teams coordinator – Larry Izzo; Assistant special teams coach – Tracy Smith; Strength and conditioning: Head strength and conditioning – Ivan Lewis; Assistant strength and conditioning – Thomas Garcia; Assistant strength and conditioning – Mark Philipp; Assistant strength and conditioning – Grant Steen; Assistant strength and conditioning – Danny Van Dijk; Assistant strength and conditioning – Jamie Yanchar

== Final roster ==
2022 Seattle Seahawks roster
Quarterbacks (QB): 2 Drew Lock; 7 Geno Smith; Running backs (RB): 44 Nick Bellore; 31 DeeJay Dallas; 38 Godwin Igwebuike; 32 Tony Jones Jr.; 9 Kenneth Walker III; Wide receivers (WR): 19 Penny Hart; 16 Tyler Lockett; 14 DK Metcalf; 18 Laquon Treadwell; 83 Dareke Young; Tight ends (TE): 87 Noah Fant; 85 Tyler Mabry; 84 Colby Parkinson	Offensive linemen (OL): 63 Austin Blythe C; 67 Charles Cross T; 74 Jake Curhan T; 78 Stone Forsythe T; 61 Kyle Fuller C; 60 Phil Haynes G; 66 Gabe Jackson G; 68 Damien Lewis G; 72 Abraham Lucas T; Defensive linemen (DL): 95 Myles Adams DE; 91 L. J. Collier DE; 97 Poona Ford DE; 93 Shelby Harris DE; 77 Quinton Jefferson DE; 99 Al Woods NT	Linebackers (LB): 57 Cody Barton ILB; 51 Bruce Irvin OLB; 50 Vi Jones ILB; 53 Boye Mafe OLB; 58 Tanner Muse ILB; 10 Uchenna Nwosu OLB; 49 Joshua Onujiogu OLB; 59 Jon Rhattigan ILB; 52 Darrell Taylor OLB; Defensive backs (DB): 23 Johnathan Abram SS; 22 Tre Brown CB; 8 Coby Bryant CB; 21 Artie Burns CB; 28 Justin Coleman CB; 37 Xavier Crawford CB; 6 Quandre Diggs FS; 30 Mike Jackson Sr. CB; 26 Ryan Neal SS; 39 Teez Tabor FS; 27 Tariq Woolen CB; Special teams (ST): 4 Michael Dickson P; 5 Jason Myers K; 46 Carson Tinker LS	Practice squad: 43 Aaron Donkor OLB (IPP); 75 Greg Eiland T; 29 Wayne Gallman RB; 70 Chris Garrett LB; 64 Jarrod Hewitt DE; 48 Jacob Hollister TE; 62 Joey Hunt C; 34 A. J. Johnson ILB; 88 Cade Johnson WR; 17 Sean Mannion QB; 76 Jalen McKenzie T; 42 Steven Parker FS; 47 Chris Steele CB; 36 Darwin Thompson RB; 81 Connor Wedington WR; 86 Easop Winston WR; Reserve: 33 Jamal Adams SS (IR); 35 Joey Blount FS (IR); 56 Jordyn Brooks ILB (IR); 55 Ben Burr-Kirven ILB (PUP); 89 Will Dissly TE (IR); 24 Isaiah Dunn CB (IR); 1 D'Wayne Eskridge WR (IR/DFR); 41 Cullen Gillaspia FB (IR); 11 Marquise Goodwin WR (IR); 25 Travis Homer RB (IR); 40 Darryl Johnson OLB (IR); 13 Josh Jones SS (IR); 90 Bryan Mone NT (IR); 69 Tyler Ott LS (IR); 20 Rashaad Penny RB (IR); 98 Alton Robinson OLB (IR); 92 Tyreke Smith OLB (IR); 15 Cody Thompson WR (IR); Rookies in italics 53 active, 18 reserve, 16 practice squad (1 exempt)

== Preseason ==
The Seahawks' preseason opponents and schedule was announced in the spring.

Week	Date	Opponent	Result	Record	Venue	Recap
1	August 13	at Pittsburgh Steelers	L 25–32	0–1	Acrisure Stadium	Recap
2	August 18	Chicago Bears	L 11–27	0–2	Lumen Field	Recap
3	August 26	at Dallas Cowboys	L 26–27	0–3	AT&T Stadium	Recap

== Regular season ==
=== Schedule ===
On May 4, the NFL announced that the Seahawks would play the Tampa Bay Buccaneers during Week 10 on November 13 at Allianz Arena in Munich, Germany, as part of the league's International Series. It was the first-ever regular season game played in Germany. The game kicked off at 3:30 p.m. CET/6:30 a.m. PST, televised by the NFL Network, with the Buccaneers serving as the home team.

Divisional matchups: the NFC West played the NFC South and the AFC West.

Week	Date	Opponent	Result	Record	Venue	Recap
1	September 12	Denver Broncos	**W** 17–16	1–0	Lumen Field	Recap
2	September 18	at **San Francisco 49ers**	**L** 7–27	1–1	Levi's Stadium	Recap
3	September 25	Atlanta Falcons	**L** 23–27	1–2	Lumen Field	Recap
4	October 2	at Detroit Lions	**W** 48–45	2–2	Ford Field	Recap
5	October 9	at New Orleans Saints	**L** 32–39	2–3	Caesars Superdome	Recap
6	October 16	**Arizona Cardinals**	**W** 19–9	3–3	Lumen Field	Recap
7	October 23	at Los Angeles Chargers	**W** 37–23	4–3	SoFi Stadium	Recap
8	October 30	New York Giants	**W** 27–13	5–3	Lumen Field	Recap
9	November 6	at **Arizona Cardinals**	**W** 31–21	6–3	State Farm Stadium	Recap
10	November 13	at Tampa Bay Buccaneers	**L** 16–21	6–4	(Germany) Allianz Arena (Munich)	Recap
11	Bye					
12	November 27	Las Vegas Raiders	**L** 34–40 (OT)	6–5	Lumen Field	Recap
13	December 4	at **Los Angeles Rams**	**W** 27–23	7–5	SoFi Stadium	Recap
14	December 11	Carolina Panthers	**L** 24–30	7–6	Lumen Field	Recap
15	December 15	**San Francisco 49ers**	**L** 13–21	7–7	Lumen Field	Recap
16	December 24	at Kansas City Chiefs	**L** 10–24	7–8	Arrowhead Stadium	Recap
17	January 1, 2023	New York Jets	**W** 23–6	8–8	Lumen Field	Recap
18	January 8, 2023	**Los Angeles Rams**	**W** 19–16 (OT)	9–8	Lumen Field	Recap

Note: Intra-division opponents are in bold text.

=== Game summaries ===
==== Week 1: vs. Denver Broncos ====
Week 1: Denver Broncos at Seattle Seahawks – Game summary

Quarter	1	2	3	4	Total
Broncos	3	10	0	3	**16**
**Seahawks**	7	10	0	0	**17**

at Lumen Field, Seattle, Washington

- Date: September 12
- Game time: 5:15 p.m. PDT
- Game weather: Sunny, 74 °F (23 °C)
- Game attendance: 68,965
- Referee: Clete Blakeman
- TV announcers (ESPN/ABC): Joe Buck, Troy Aikman and Lisa Salters
- Recap, Game Book

Game information

**First quarter**

- SEA – Will Dissly 38-yard pass from Geno Smith (Jason Myers kick), 11:26. Seahawks 7–0. **Drive: 6 plays, 70 yards, 3:34.**
- DEN – Brandon McManus 30-yard field goal, 6:55. Seahawks 7–3. **Drive: 9 plays, 77 yards, 4:31.**

**Second quarter**

- SEA – Jason Myers 49-yard field goal, 7:20. Seahawks 10–3. **Drive: 9 plays, 50 yards, 5:54.**
- DEN – Jerry Jeudy 67-yard pass from Russell Wilson (Brandon McManus kick), 5:34. Tied 10–10. **Drive: 3 plays, 75 yards, 1:46.**
- SEA – Colby Parkinson 25-yard pass from Geno Smith (Jason Myers kick), 2:24. Seahawks 17–10. **Drive: 7 plays, 75 yards, 3:10.**
- DEN – Brandon McManus 40-yard field goal, 0:00. Seahawks 17–13. **Drive: 9 plays, 57 yards, 2:24.**

**Third quarter**

- No scoring plays.

**Fourth quarter**

- DEN – Brandon McManus 26-yard field goal, 6:13. Seahawks 17–16. **Drive: 15 plays, 72 yards, 6:37.**

**Top passers**

- DEN – Russell Wilson – 29/42, 340 yards, TD
- SEA – Geno Smith – 23/28, 195 yards, 2 TD

**Top rushers**

- DEN – Melvin Gordon III – 12 rushes, 58 yards
- SEA – Rashaad Penny – 12 rushes, 60 yards

**Top receivers**

- DEN – Jerry Jeudy – 4 receptions, 102 yards, TD
- SEA – Colby Parkinson – 2 receptions, 43 yards, TD

==== Week 2: at San Francisco 49ers ====
Week 2: Seattle Seahawks at San Francisco 49ers – Game summary

Quarter	1	2	3	4	Total
Seahawks	0	0	7	0	**7**
**49ers**	6	14	0	7	**27**

at Levi's Stadium, Santa Clara, California

- Date: September 18
- Game time: 1:05 p.m. PDT
- Game weather: 63 °F (17 °C)
- Game attendance: 71,597
- Referee: Brad Rogers
- TV announcers (Fox): Adam Amin, Mark Schlereth and Kristina Pink
- Recap, Game Book

Game information

**First quarter**

- SF – Robbie Gould 20-yard field goal, 9:16. 49ers 3–0. **Drive: 11 plays, 73 yards, 5:44.**
- SF – Robbie Gould 33-yard field goal, 1:26. 49ers 6–0. **Drive: 7 plays, 74 yards, 4:27.**

**Second quarter**

- SF – Ross Dwelley 38-yard pass from Jimmy Garoppolo (Robbie Gould kick), 11:19. 49ers 13–0. **Drive: 4 plays, 78 yards, 2:16.**
- SF – Kyle Juszczyk 1-yard run (Robbie Gould kick), 1:26. 49ers 20–0. **Drive: 4 plays, 22 yards, 0:21.**

**Third quarter**

- SEA – Mike Jackson Sr. 85-yard blocked field goal return (Jason Myers kick), 5:25. 49ers 20–7.

**Fourth quarter**

- SF – Jimmy Garoppolo 1-yard run (Robbie Gould kick), 1:51. 49ers 27–7. **Drive: 13 plays, 63 yards, 7:09.**

**Top passers**

- SEA – Geno Smith – 24/30, 198 yards, INT
- SF – Jimmy Garoppolo – 13/21, 154 yards, TD

**Top rushers**

- SEA – Rashaad Penny – 6 rushes, 15 yards
- SF – Jeff Wilson Jr. – 18 rushes, 84 yards

**Top receivers**

- SEA – Tyler Lockett – 9 receptions, 107 yards
- SF – Brandon Aiyuk – 5 reception, 63 yards

==== Week 3: vs. Atlanta Falcons ====
Week 3: Atlanta Falcons at Seattle Seahawks – Game summary

Quarter	1	2	3	4	Total
**Falcons**	10	7	10	0	**27**
Seahawks	10	10	3	0	**23**

at Lumen Field, Seattle, Washington

- Date: September 25
- Game time: 1:25 p.m. PDT
- Game weather: Sunny, 67 °F (19 °C)
- Game attendance: 68,773
- Referee: Tra Blake
- TV announcers (Fox): Chris Myers, Robert Smith, and Jen Hale
- Recap, Game Book

Game information

**First quarter**

- SEA – Jason Myers 32-yard field goal, 10:19. Seahwaks 3–0. **Drive: 11 plays, 61 yards, 4:41.**
- ATL – Marcus Mariota 1-yard run (Younghoe Koo kick), 7:10. Falcons 7–3. **Drive: 7 plays, 75 yards, 3:09.**
- SEA – Will Dissly 18-yard pass from Geno Smith (Jason Myers kick), 4:12. Seahawks 10–7. **Drive: 6 plays, 74 yards, 2:58.**
- ATL – Younghoe Koo 41-yard field goal, 0:07. Tied 10–10. **Drive: 9 plays, 52 yards, 4:05.**

**Second quarter**

- ATL – Cordarrelle Patterson 17-yard run (Younghoe Koo kick), 8:12. Falcons 17–10. **Drive: 9 plays, 89 yards, 5:31.**
- SEA – DK Metcalf 18-yard pass from Geno Smith (Jason Myers kick), 3:58. Tied 17–17. **Drive: 9 plays, 75 yards, 4:14.**
- SEA – Jason Myers 31-yard field goal, 0:05. Seahwaks 20–17. **Drive: 12 plays, 67 yards, 2:58.**

**Third quarter**

- ATL – Younghoe Koo 54-yard field goal, 10:00. Tied 20–20. **Drive: 9 plays, 39 yards, 5:00.**
- SEA – Jason Myers 25-yard field goal, 3:11. Seahwaks 23–20. **Drive: 13 plays, 68 yards, 6:49.**
- ATL – Drake London 14-yard pass from Marcus Mariota (Younghoe Koo kick), 0:35. Falcons 27–23. **Drive: 5 plays, 75 yards, 2:36.**

**Fourth quarter**

- No scoring plays.

**Top passers**

- ATL – Marcus Mariota – 13/20, 229 yards, TD, INT
- SEA – Geno Smith – 32/44, 325 yards, 2 TD, INT

**Top rushers**

- ATL – Cordarrelle Patterson – 17 rushes, 141 yards, TD
- SEA – Rashaad Penny – 14 rushes, 66 yards

**Top receivers**

- ATL – Kyle Pitts – 5 receptions, 87 yards
- SEA – Tyler Lockett – 9 receptions, 76 yards

==== Week 4: at Detroit Lions ====
Week 4: Seattle Seahawks at Detroit Lions – Game summary

Quarter	1	2	3	4	Total
**Seahawks**	14	10	14	10	**48**
Lions	6	9	8	22	**45**

at Ford Field, Detroit, Michigan

- Date: October 2
- Game time: 1:00 p.m. EDT/10:00 a.m. PDT
- Game weather: None (indoor stadium)
- Game attendance: 63,920
- Referee: Clay Martin
- TV announcers (Fox): Chris Myers, Robert Smith, and Jen Hale
- Recap, Game Book

Game information

**First quarter**

- SEA – Will Dissly 17-yard pass from Geno Smith (Jason Myers kick), 8:24. Seahawks 7–0. **Drive: 11 plays, 75 yards, 6:36.**
- DET – T. J. Hockenson 32-yard pass from Jared Goff (kick failed, wide left), 6:47. Seahawks 7–6. **Drive: 1 play, 32 yards, 0:07.**
- SEA – Geno Smith 8-yard run (Jason Myers kick), 4:35. Seahawks 14–6. **Drive: 5 plays, 75 yards, 2:12.**

**Second quarter**

- DET – Dominik Eberle 49-yard field goal, 13:07. Seahawks 14–9. **Drive: 12 plays, 41 yards, 6:28.**
- SEA – Jason Myers 56-yard field goal, 9:08. Seahawks 17–9. **Drive: 8 plays, 22 yards, 3:59.**
- SEA – Noah Fant 2-yard pass from Geno Smith (Jason Myers kick), 5:04. Seahawks 24–9. **Drive: 3 plays, 52 yards, 1:38.**
- DET – Jamaal Williams 1-yard run (kick failed, wide right), 0:00. Seahawks 24–15. **Drive: 12 plays, 75 yards, 5:04.**

**Third quarter**

- SEA – Tariq Woolen 40-yard interception return (Jason Myers kick), 14:49. Seahawks 31–15. **Drive: 1 play, 0 yards, 0:11.**
- DET – Jamaal Williams 51-yard run (Jared Goff run), 6:30. Seahawks 31–23. **Drive: 3 plays, 71 yards, 0:59.**
- SEA – Rashaad Penny 36-yard run (Jason Myers kick), 0:33. Seahawks 38–23. **Drive: 11 plays, 75 yards, 5:57.**

**Fourth quarter**

- DET – Josh Reynolds 3-yard pass from Jared Goff (Jared Goff–T. J. Hockenson pass), 14:23. Seahawks 38–31. **Drive: 3 plays, 75 yards, 1:10.**
- SEA – Jason Myers 25-yard field goal, 9:32. Seahawks 41–31. **Drive: 10 plays, 68 yards, 4:51.**
- DET – T. J. Hockenson 4-yard pass from Jared Goff (Dominik Eberle kick), 5:26. Seahawks 41–38. **Drive: 12 plays, 75 yards, 4:06.**
- SEA – Rashaad Penny 41-yard run (Jason Myers kick), 2:14. Seahawks 48–38. **Drive: 7 plays, 75 yards, 3:12.**
- DET – Justin Jackson 2-yard pass from Jared Goff (Dominik Eberle kick), 1:06. Seahawks 48–45. **Drive: 9 plays, 75 yards, 1:08.**

**Top passers**

- SEA – Geno Smith – 23/30, 320 yards, 2 TD
- DET – Jared Goff – 26/39, 378 yards, 4 TD, INT

**Top rushers**

- SEA – Rashaad Penny – 17 rushes, 151 yards, 2 TD
- DET – Jamaal Williams – 19 rushes, 108 yards, 2 TD

**Top receivers**

- SEA – DK Metcalf – 7 receptions, 149 yards
- DET – T. J. Hockenson – 8 receptions, 179 yards, 2 TD

This game ultimately ended up determining the 7th seed in the playoff race, which Seattle clinched due to holding tiebreaker over the Lions thanks to this game

==== Week 5: at New Orleans Saints ====
Week 5: Seattle Seahawks at New Orleans Saints – Game summary

Quarter	1	2	3	4	Total
Seahawks	10	9	0	13	**32**
**Saints**	3	14	14	8	**39**

at Caesars Superdome, New Orleans, Louisiana

- Date: October 9
- Game time: 12:00 p.m. CDT/10:00 a.m. PDT
- Game weather: None (indoor stadium)
- Game attendance: 70,003
- Referee: Brad Allen
- TV announcers (Fox): Brandon Gaudin, Matt Millen and Megan Olivi
- Recap, Game Book

Game information

**First quarter**

- NO – Wil Lutz 56-yard field goal, 9:34. Saints 3–0. **Drive: 10 plays, 41 yards, 5:26.**
- SEA – DK Metcalf 50-yard pass from Geno Smith (Jason Myers kick), 6:41. Seahawks 7–3. **Drive: 5 plays, 75 yards, 2:53.**
- SEA – Jason Myers 56-yard field goal, 1:13. Seahawks 10–3. **Drive: 6 plays, 36 yards, 2:57.**

**Second quarter**

- NO – Taysom Hill 8-yard run (Wil Lutz kick), 10:54. Tied 10–10. **Drive: 10 plays, 69 yards, 5:19.**
- NO – Taysom Hill 9-yard run (Wil Lutz kick), 3:34. Saints 17–10. **Drive: 2 plays, 13 yards, 0:45.**
- SEA – Jason Myers 31-yard field goal, 1:42. Saints 17–13. **Drive: 9 plays, 62 yards, 1:52.**
- SEA – Tyler Lockett 35-yard pass from Geno Smith (kick failed), 0:07. Seahawks 19–17. **Drive: 3 plays, 50 yards, 0:13.**

**Third quarter**

- NO – Chris Olave 16-yard pass from Andy Dalton (Wil Lutz kick), 12:03. Saints 24–19. **Drive: 6 plays, 31 yards, 2:47.**
- NO – Adam Trautman 22-yard pass from Taysom Hill (Wil Lutz kick), 0:36. Saints 31–19. **Drive: 4 plays, 79 yards, 2:10.**

**Fourth quarter**

- SEA – Tyler Lockett 40-yard pass from Geno Smith (pass failed), 14:08. Saints 31–25. **Drive: 3 plays, 75 yards, 1:28.**
- SEA – Kenneth Walker III 69-yard pass from Geno Smith (Jason Myers kick), 6:54. Seahawks 32–31. **Drive: 2 plays, 78 yards, 0:46.**
- NO – Taysom Hill 60-yard run (Mark Ingram II run), 5:22. Saints 39–32. **Drive: 3 plays, 69 yards, 1:32.**

**Top passers**

- SEA – Geno Smith – 16/25, 268 yards, 3 TD
- NO – Andy Dalton – 16/24, 187 yards, TD, INT

**Top rushers**

- SEA – Kenneth Walker III – 8 rushes, 88 yards, TD
- NO – Taysom Hill – 9 rushes, 112 yards, 3 TD

**Top receivers**

- SEA – Tyler Lockett – 5 receptions, 104 yards, 2 TD
- NO – Alvin Kamara – 6 receptions, 91 yards

==== Week 6: vs. Arizona Cardinals ====
Week 6: Arizona Cardinals at Seattle Seahawks – Game summary

Quarter	1	2	3	4	Total
Cardinals	3	0	6	0	**9**
**Seahawks**	3	6	3	7	**19**

at Lumen Field, Seattle, Washington

- Date: October 16
- Game time: 1:05 p.m.
- Game weather: Sunny, 72 °F (22 °C)
- Game attendance: 68,867
- Referee: Shawn Hochuli
- TV announcers (Fox): Chris Myers, Robert Smith and Jen Hale
- Recap, Game Book

Game information

**First quarter**

- ARI – Matt Ammendola 23-yard field goal, 10:20. Cardinals 3–0. **Drive: 10 plays, 76 yards, 4:40.**
- SEA – Jason Myers 39-yard field goal, 6:41. Tied 3–3. **Drive: 8 plays, 54 yards, 3:39.**

**Second quarter**

- SEA – Jason Myers 27-yard field goal, 6:05. Seahawks 6–3. **Drive: 10 plays, 51 yards, 4:44.**
- SEA – Jason Myers 34-yard field goal, 0:00. Seahawks 9–3. **Drive: 7 plays, 53 yards, 0:55.**

**Third quarter**

- SEA – Jason Myers 32-yard field goal, 4:11. Seahawks 12–3. **Drive: 9 plays, 58 yards, 5:00.**
- ARI – Chris Banjo fumble recovery in the end zone (kick failed, wide left), 0:54. Seahawks 12–9.

**Fourth quarter**

- SEA – Kenneth Walker III 11-yard run (Jason Myers kick), 13:24. Seahawks 19–9. **Drive: 7 plays, 75 yards, 2:30.**

**Top passers**

- ARI – Kyler Murray – 23/37, 222 yards, INT
- SEA – Geno Smith – 20/31, 197 yards

**Top rushers**

- ARI – Kyler Murray – 10 rushes, 100 yards
- SEA – Kenneth Walker III – 21 rushes, 97 yards, TD

**Top receivers**

- ARI – Zach Ertz – 7 receptions, 70 yards
- SEA – Noah Fant – 6 receptions, 45 yards

==== Week 7: at Los Angeles Chargers ====
Week 7: Seattle Seahawks at Los Angeles Chargers – Game summary

Quarter	1	2	3	4	Total
**Seahawks**	17	7	3	10	**37**
Chargers	0	14	0	9	**23**

at SoFi Stadium, Inglewood, California

- Date: October 23
- Game time: 1:25 p.m. PDT
- Game weather: None (retractable roof closed)
- Game attendance: 70,240
- Referee: Land Clark
- TV announcers (Fox): Kevin Kugler, Mark Sanchez and Laura Okmin
- Recap, Game Book

Game information

**First quarter**

- SEA – Marquise Goodwin 20-yard pass from Geno Smith (Jason Myers kick), 7:29. Seahawks 7–0. **Drive: 8 plays, 68 yards, 4:11.**
- SEA – Kenneth Walker III 12-yard run (Jason Myers kick), 4:17. Seahawks 14–0. **Drive: 4 plays, 43 yards, 1:09.**
- SEA – Jason Myers 46-yard field goal, 1:08. Seahawks 17–0. **Drive: 4 plays, 9 yards, 1:26.**

**Second quarter**

- LAC – Austin Ekeler 7-yard run (Taylor Bertolet kick), 12:44. Seahawks 17–7. **Drive: 8 plays, 75 yards, 3:24.**
- LAC – Mike Williams 13-yard pass from Justin Herbert (Taylor Bertolet kick), 9:37. Seahawks 17–14. **Drive: 6 plays, 33 yards, 2:23.**
- SEA – Marquise Goodwin 23-yard pass from Geno Smith (Jason Myers kick), 1:40. Seahawks 24–14. **Drive: 7 plays, 73 yards, 2:43.**

**Third quarter**

- SEA – Jason Myers 34-yard field goal, 1:06. Seahawks 27–14. **Drive: 17 plays, 77 yards, 10:20.**

**Fourth quarter**

- LAC – Kenneth Walker III tackled in end zone, 14:17. Seahawks 27–16. **Drive: 7 plays, 75 yards, 2:30.**
- SEA – Jason Myers 50-yard field goal, 9:09. Seahawks 30–16. **Drive: 7 plays, 31 yards, 3:38.**
- SEA – Kenneth Walker III 74-yard run (Jason Myers kick), 6:56. Seahawks 37–16. **Drive: 1 plays, 74 yards, 0:12.**
- LAC – Austin Ekeler 1-yard pass from Justin Herbert (Taylor Bertolet kick), 3:22. Seahawks 37–23. **Drive: 11 plays, 75 yards, 3:34.**

**Top passers**

- SEA – Geno Smith – 20/27, 210 yards, 2 TD, INT
- LAC – Justin Herbert – 33/51, 293 yards, 2 TD, INT

**Top rushers**

- SEA – Kenneth Walker III – 23 rushes, 168 yards, 2 TD
- LAC – Austin Ekeler – 9 rushes, 31 yards, TD

**Top receivers**

- SEA – Tyler Lockett – 7 receptions, 45 yards
- LAC – Austin Ekeler – 12 receptions, 96 yards, TD

==== Week 8: vs. New York Giants ====
Week 8: New York Giants at Seattle Seahawks – Game summary

Quarter	1	2	3	4	Total
Giants	0	7	3	3	**13**
**Seahawks**	0	10	3	14	**27**

at Lumen Field, Seattle, Washington

- Date: October 30
- Game time: 1:25 p.m. PDT
- Game weather: Rain, 54 °F (12 °C)
- Game attendance: 68,921
- Referee: Jerome Boger
- TV announcers (Fox): Kevin Kugler, Mark Sanchez and Laura Okmin
- Recap, Game Book

Game information

**First quarter**

- No scoring plays.

**Second quarter**

- SEA – DK Metcalf 3-yard pass from Geno Smith (Jason Myers kick), 12:07. Seahawks 7–0. **Drive: 15 plays, 69 yards, 5:55.**
- NYG – Saquon Barkley 1-yard run (Graham Gano kick), 5:51. Tied 7–7. **Drive: 2 plays, 2 yards, 0:39.**
- SEA – Jason Myers 35-yard field goal, 1:38. Seahawks 10–7. **Drive: 4 plays, 2 yards, 0:45.**

**Third quarter**

- NYG – Graham Gano 31-yard field goal, 6:04. Tied 10–10. **Drive: 14 plays, 79 yards, 8:56.**
- SEA – Jason Myers 51-yard field goal, 2:42. Seahawks 13–10. **Drive: 7 plays, 42 yards, 3:22.**

**Fourth quarter**

- NYG – Graham Gano 45-yard field goal, 11:17. Tied 13–13. **Drive: 12 plays, 45 yards, 6:25.**
- SEA – Tyler Lockett 33-yard pass from Geno Smith (Jason Myers kick), 9:18. Seahawks 20–13. **Drive: 5 plays, 75 yards, 1:59.**
- SEA – Kenneth Walker III 16-yard run (Jason Myers kick), 5:22. Seahawks 27–13. **Drive: 2 plays, 32 yards, 0:42.**

**Top passers**

- NYG – Daniel Jones – 17/31, 176 yards
- SEA – Geno Smith – 23/34, 212 yards, 2 TD

**Top rushers**

- NYG – Saquon Barkley – 20 rushes, 53 yards, TD
- SEA – Kenneth Walker III – 18 rushes, 51 yards, TD

**Top receivers**

- NYG – Darius Slayton – 5 receptions, 66 yards
- SEA – Tyler Lockett – 5 receptions, 63 yards, TD

==== Week 9: at Arizona Cardinals ====
Week 9: Seattle Seahawks at Arizona Cardinals – Game summary

Quarter	1	2	3	4	Total
**Seahawks**	3	7	7	14	**31**
Cardinals	7	0	7	7	**21**

at State Farm Stadium, Glendale, Arizona

- Date: November 6
- Game time: 2:05 p.m. MST/1:05 p.m. PST
- Game weather: Sunny, 76 °F (24 °C) (retractable roof open)
- Game attendance: 63,982
- Referee: Carl Cheffers
- TV announcers (Fox): Adam Amin, Daryl Johnston and Pam Oliver
- Recap, Game Book

Game information

**First quarter**

- SEA – Jason Myers 49-yard field goal, 10:50. Seahawks 3–0. **Drive: 8 plays, 34 yards, 4:10.**
- ARI – DeAndre Hopkins 22-yard pass from Kyler Murray (Matt Prater kick), 6:17. Cardinals 7–3. **Drive: 9 plays, 83 yards, 4:33.**

**Second quarter**

- SEA – DK Metcalf 4-yard pass from Geno Smith (Jason Myers kick), 11:59. Seahawks 10–7. **Drive: 12 plays, 79 yards, 6:08.**

**Third quarter**

- ARI – Zaven Collins 30-yard interception return (Matt Prater kick), 9:18. Cardinals 14–10.
- SEA – Tyler Lockett 9-yard pass from Geno Smith (Jason Myers kick), 2:43. Seahawks 17–14. **Drive: 13 plays, 75 yards, 6:35.**

**Fourth quarter**

- SEA – Kenneth Walker III 1-yard run (Jason Myers kick), 7:32. Seahawks 24–14. **Drive: 13 plays, 81 yards, 6:46.**
- ARI – Zach Ertz 6-yard pass from Kyler Murray (Matt Prater kick), 3:32. Seahawks 24–21. **Drive: 14 plays, 75 yards, 4:00.**
- SEA – Kenneth Walker III 5-yard run (Jason Myers kick), 2:14. Seahawks 31–21. **Drive: 5 plays, 85 yards, 1:18.**

**Top passers**

- SEA – Geno Smith – 26/34, 275 yards, 2 TD, INT
- ARI – Kyler Murray – 25/35, 175 yards, 2 TD

**Top rushers**

- SEA – Kenneth Walker III – 26 rushes, 109 yards, 2 TD
- ARI – Kyler Murray – 8 rushes, 60 yards

**Top receivers**

- SEA – Noah Fant – 5 receptions, 96 yards
- ARI – Rondale Moore – 8 receptions, 69 yards

With the win, the Seahawks swept the Cardinals for the first time since 2018.

==== Week 10: at Tampa Bay Buccaneers ====
NFL Germany games

Week 10: Seattle Seahawks at Tampa Bay Buccaneers – Game summary

Quarter	1	2	3	4	Total
Seahawks	0	0	3	13	**16**
**Buccaneers**	0	14	0	7	**21**

at Allianz Arena, Munich, Bavaria, Germany

- Date: November 13
- Game time: 3:30 p.m. CET/6:30 a.m. PST
- Game weather: Sunny, 48 °F (9 °C)
- Game attendance: 69,811
- Referee: John Hussey
- TV announcers (NFLN): Rich Eisen, Kurt Warner, Michael Irvin, Steve Mariucci, Jamie Erdahl and Sara Walsh
- Recap, Game Book

Game information

**First quarter**

- **No scoring plays.**

**Second quarter**

- TB – Julio Jones 31-yard pass from Tom Brady (Ryan Succop kick), 13:40. Buccaneers 7–0 **Drive: 13 plays, 88 yards, 6:32**
- TB – Leonard Fournette 1-yard run (Ryan Succop kick), 4:31. Buccaneers 14–0 **Drive: 13 plays, 86 yards,**

**Third quarter**

- SEA – Jason Myers 55-yard field goal, 12:05. Buccaneers 14–3 **Drive: 8 plays, 38 yards, 2:55**

**Fourth quarter**

- TB – Chris Godwin 4-yard pass from Tom Brady (Ryan Succop kick), 10:48. Buccaneers 21–3 :
- SEA – Tyler Lockett 21-yard pass from Geno Smith (pass failed), 8:20. Buccaneers 21–9 **Drive: 5 plays, 77 yards, 2:28**
- SEA – Marquise Goodwin 19-yard pass from Geno Smith (Jason Mayers kick), 3:58. Buccaneers 21–16 **Drive: 8 plays, 45 yards, 2:26**

**Top passers**

- SEA – Geno Smith 23/33, 275 yards, 2 TD
- TB – Tom Brady 22/29, 258 yards, 2 TD, INT

**Top rushers**

- SEA – Geno Smith 4 rushes, 22 yards
- TB – Rachaad White 22 rushes, 105 yards

**Top receivers**

- SEA – DK Metcalf 6 receptions, 71 yards
- TB – Chris Godwin 6 receptions, 71 yards, TD

==== Week 12: vs. Las Vegas Raiders ====
Week 12: Las Vegas Raiders at Seattle Seahawks – Game summary

Quarter	1	2	3	4	OT	Total
**Raiders**	7	17	3	7	6	**40**
Seahawks	10	10	7	7	0	**34**

at Lumen Field, Seattle, Washington

- Date: November 27
- Game time: 1:05 p.m. PST
- Game weather: Partly cloudy, 45 °F (7 °C)
- Game attendance: 68,849
- Referee: Brad Allen
- TV announcers (CBS): Greg Gumbel, Adam Archuleta and AJ Ross
- Recap, Game Book

Game information

**First quarter**

- SEA – Kenneth Walker III 12-yard run (Jason Myers kick), 14:32. Seahawks 7–0. **Drive: 2 plays, 12 yards, 0:13.**
- LV – Ameer Abdullah 18-yard pass from Derek Carr (Daniel Carlson kick), 9:24. Tied 7–7. **Drive: 11 plays, 75 yards, 5:08.**
- SEA – Jason Myers 24-yard field goal, 4:23. Seahawks 10–7. **Drive: 5 plays, 29 yards, 1:32.**

**Second quarter**

- SEA – Jason Myers 34-yard field goal, 13:34. Seahawks 13–7. **Drive: 8 plays, 47 yards, 4:06.**
- LV – Mack Hollins 36-yard pass from Derek Carr (Daniel Carlson kick), 10:02. Raiders 14–13. **Drive: 6 plays, 61 yards, 3:32.**
- LV – Josh Jacobs 30-yard run (Daniel Carlson kick), 8:29. Raiders 21–13. **Drive: 1 play, 30 yards, 0:07.**
- SEA – Tyler Lockett 35-yard pass from Geno Smith (Jason Myers kick), 5:21. Raiders 21–20. **Drive: 7 plays, 75 yards, 3:08.**
- LV – Daniel Carlson 36-yard field goal, 0:10. Raiders 24–20. **Drive: 13 plays, 57 yards, 5:11.**

**Third quarter**

- SEA – Kenneth Walker III 14-yard run (Jason Myers kick), 11:46. Seahawks 27–24. **Drive: 7 plays, 75 yards, 3:14.**
- LV – Daniel Carlson 25-yard field goal, 5:03. Tied 27–27. **Drive: 11 plays, 68 yards, 6:43.**

**Fourth quarter**

- SEA – Travis Homer 18-yard pass from Geno Smith (Jason Myers kick), 5:37. Seahawks 34–27. **Drive: 7 plays, 47 yards, 3:18.**
- LV – Foster Moreau 5-yard pass from Derek Carr (Daniel Carlson kick), 1:54. Tied 34–34. **Drive: 10 plays, 75 yards, 3:43.**

**Overtime**

- LV – Josh Jacobs 86-yard run, 4:20. Raiders 40–34. **Drive: 1 play, 86 yards, 0:12.**

**Top passers**

- LV – Derek Carr – 25/36, 295 yards, 3 TD, 2 INT
- SEA – Geno Smith – 27/37, 328 yards, 2 TD, INT

**Top rushers**

- LV – Josh Jacobs – 33 rushes, 229 yards, 2 TD
- SEA – Kenneth Walker III – 14 rushes, 26 yards, 2 TD

**Top receivers**

- LV – Davante Adams – 7 receptions, 74 yards
- SEA – DK Metcalf – 11 receptions, 90 yards

==== Week 13: at Los Angeles Rams ====
Week 13: Seattle Seahawks at Los Angeles Rams – Game summary

Quarter	1	2	3	4	Total
**Seahawks**	7	7	3	10	**27**
Rams	10	3	0	10	**23**

at SoFi Stadium, Inglewood, California

- Date: December 4
- Game time: 1:05 p.m. PST
- Game weather: Cloudy, 64 °F (18 °C)
- Game attendance: 71,802
- Referee: Shawn Smith
- TV announcers (Fox): Kevin Kugler, Mark Sanchez and Laura Okmin
- Recap, Game Book

Game information

**First quarter**

- LAR – Cam Akers 1-yard run (Matt Gay kick), 9:30. Rams 7–0. **Drive: 10 plays, 77 yards, 5:30.**
- SEA – Tyler Lockett 36-yard pass from Geno Smith (Jason Myers kick), 6:05. Tied 7–7. **Drive: 6 plays, 75 yards, 3:25.**
- LAR – Matt Gay 40-yard field goal, 2:34. Rams 10–7. **Drive: 7 plays, 53 yards, 3:31.**

**Second quarter**

- SEA – Noah Fant 4-yard pass from Geno Smith (Jason Myers kick), 9:48. Seahawks 14–10. **Drive: 11 plays, 91 yards, 5:12.**
- LAR – Matt Gay 54-yard field goal, 0:55. Seahawks 14–13. **Drive: 7 plays, 28 yards, 2:09.**

**Third quarter**

- SEA – Jason Myers 41-yard field goal, 7:33. Seahawks 17–13. **Drive: 8 plays, 60 yards, 3:49.**

**Fourth quarter**

- LAR – Matt Gay 32-yard field goal, 12:57. Seahawks 17–16. **Drive: 9 plays, 42 yards, 3:49.**
- SEA – Jason Myers 26-yard field goal, 6:46. Seahawks 20–16. **Drive: 11 plays, 67 yards, 6:11.**
- LAR – Cam Akers 6-yard run (Matt Gay kick), 2:56. Rams 23–20. **Drive: 9 plays, 75 yards, 3:50.**
- SEA – DK Metcalf 8-yard pass from Geno Smith (Jason Myers kick), 0:36. Seahawks 27–23. **Drive: 10 plays, 75 yards, 2:20.**

**Top passers**

- SEA – Geno Smith – 28/39, 367 yards, 3 TD, INT
- LAR – John Wolford – 14/26, 178 yards, 2 INT

**Top rushers**

- SEA – DeeJay Dallas – 10 rushes, 37 yards
- LAR – Cam Akers – 17 rushes, 60 yards, 2 TD

**Top receivers**

- SEA – Tyler Lockett – 9 receptions, 128 yards, TD
- LAR – Tutu Atwell – 2 receptions, 48 yards

With the win, the Seahawks defeated the Rams in Los Angeles for the first time since 2017.

==== Week 14: vs. Carolina Panthers ====
Week 14: Carolina Panthers at Seattle Seahawks – Game summary

Quarter	1	2	3	4	Total
**Panthers**	10	10	0	10	**30**
Seahawks	0	14	3	7	**24**

at Lumen Field, Seattle, Washington

- Date: December 11
- Game time: 1:25 p.m. PST
- Game weather: Cloudy, 45 °F (7 °C)
- Game attendance: 68,672
- Referee: Bill Vinovich
- TV announcers (Fox): Adam Amin, Mark Schlereth and Kristina Pink
- Recap, Game Book

Game information

**First quarter**

- CAR – Eddy Piñeiro 47-yard field goal, 7:05. Panthers 3–0. **Drive: 13 plays, 43 yards, 7:55.**
- CAR – Shi Smith 13-yard pass from Sam Darnold (Eddy Piñeiro kick), 6:44. Panthers 10–0. **Drive: 1 play, 13 yards, 0:05.**

**Second quarter**

- CAR – Chuba Hubbard 2-yard run (Eddy Piñeiro kick), 12:35. Panthers 17–0. **Drive: 12 plays, 74 yards, 6:52.**
- SEA – Tyler Lockett 4-yard pass from Geno Smith (Jason Myers kick), 9:26. Panthers 17–7. **Drive: 7 plays, 67 yards, 3:09.**
- CAR – Eddy Piñeiro 32-yard field goal, 2:09. Panthers 20–7. **Drive: 8 plays, 25 yards, 4:09.**
- SEA – DK Metcalf 12-yard pass from Geno Smith (Jason Myers kick), 0:16. Panthers 20–14. **Drive: 9 plays, 46 yards, 1:53.**

**Third quarter**

- SEA – Jason Myers 27-yard field goal, 10:00. Panthers 20–17. **Drive: 9 plays, 51 yards, 5:00.**

**Fourth quarter**

- CAR – Raheem Blackshear 8-yard run (Eddy Piñeiro kick), 6:57. Panthers 27–17. **Drive: 10 plays, 74 yards, 5:26.**
- CAR – Eddy Piñeiro 39-yard field goal, 1:56. Panthers 30–17. **Drive: 9 plays, 44 yards, 4:21.**
- SEA – Marquise Goodwin 24-yard pass from Geno Smith (Jason Myers kick), 0:16. Panthers 30–24. **Drive: 6 plays, 75 yards, 1:40.**

**Top passers**

- CAR – Sam Darnold – 14/24, 120 yards, TD
- SEA – Geno Smith – 19/35, 142 yards, TD

**Top rushers**

- CAR – D'Onta Foreman – 21 rushes, 74 yards
- SEA – Travis Homer – 9 rushes, 26 yards

**Top receivers**

- CAR – Laviska Shenault – 4 receptions, 31 yards
- SEA – Marquise Goodwin – 5 receptions, 95 yards, TD

With the loss, the Seahawks dropped to 7–6 and were swept by the NFC South.

==== Week 15: vs. San Francisco 49ers ====
Week 15: San Francisco 49ers at Seattle Seahawks – Game summary

Quarter	1	2	3	4	Total
**49ers**	7	7	7	0	**21**
Seahawks	0	3	3	7	**13**

at Lumen Field, Seattle, Washington

- Date: December 15
- Game time: 5:15 p.m. PST
- Game weather: Clear, 39 °F (4 °C)
- Game attendance: 68,957
- Referee: Alex Kemp
- TV announcers (KCPQ/Prime Video): Al Michaels, Kirk Herbstreit and Kaylee Hartung
- Recap, Game Book

Game information

**First quarter**

- SF – George Kittle 28-yard pass from Brock Purdy (Robbie Gould kick), 3:49. 49ers 7–0. **Drive: 9 plays, 86 yards, 5:24.**

**Second quarter**

- SEA – Jason Myers 38-yard field goal, 4:47. 49ers 7–3. **Drive: 12 plays, 62 yards, 5:50.**
- SF – Christian McCaffrey 1-yard run (Robbie Gould kick), 0:47. 49ers 14–3. **Drive: 2 plays, 6 yards, 0:09.**

**Third quarter**

- SF – George Kittle 54-yard pass from Brock Purdy (Robbie Gould kick), 14:00. 49ers 21–3. **Drive: 2 plays, 59 yards, 1:00.**
- SEA – Jason Myers 51-yard field goal, 8:08. 49ers 21–6. **Drive: 10 plays, 42 yards, 5:52.**

**Fourth quarter**

- SEA – Noah Fant 10-yard pass from Geno Smith (Jason Myers kick), 3:35. 49ers 21–13. **Drive: 7 plays, 67 yards, 1:25.**

**Top passers**

- SF – Brock Purdy – 17/26, 217 yards, 2 TD
- SEA – Geno Smith – 31/44, 238 yards, TD

**Top rushers**

- SF – Christian McCaffrey – 26 rushes, 108 yards, TD
- SEA – Kenneth Walker III – 12 rushes, 47 yards

**Top receivers**

- SF – George Kittle – 4 receptions, 93 yards, 2 TD
- SEA – Tyler Lockett – 7 receptions, 68 yards

With the loss, the Seahawks were swept by the 49ers for the first time since 2011.

==== Week 16: at Kansas City Chiefs ====
Week 16: Seattle Seahawks at Kansas City Chiefs – Game summary

Quarter	1	2	3	4	Total
Seahawks	0	3	0	7	**10**
**Chiefs**	7	10	0	7	**24**

at Arrowhead Stadium, Kansas City, Missouri

- Date: December 24
- Game time: 12:00 p.m. CST/10:00 a.m. PST
- Game weather: 12 °F (−11 °C)
- Game attendance: 73,331
- Referee: Clete Blakeman
- TV announcers (Fox): Kevin Kugler, Mark Sanchez and Laura Okmin
- Recap, Game Book

Game information

**First quarter**

- KC – Kadarius Toney 8-yard pass from Patrick Mahomes (Harrison Butker kick), 6:41. Chiefs 7–0. **Drive: 9 plays, 63 yards, 5:12.**

**Second quarter**

- KC – Jerick McKinnon 9-yard pass from Patrick Mahomes (Harrison Butker kick), 8:56. Chiefs 14–0. **Drive: 7 plays, 53 yards, 3:21.**
- KC – Harrison Butker 47-yard field goal, 2:40. Chiefs 17–0. **Drive: 6 plays, 43 yards, 2:48.**
- SEA – Jason Myers 22-yard field goal, 0:00. Chiefs 17–3. **Drive: 11 plays, 90 yards, 2:40.**

**Third quarter**

- No scoring plays.

**Fourth quarter**

- KC – Patrick Mahomes 3-yard run (Harrison Butker kick), 4:42. Chiefs 24–3. **Drive: 5 plays, 80 yards, 3:00.**
- SEA – Noah Fant 6-yard pass from Geno Smith (Jason Myers kick), 2:25. Chiefs 24–10. **Drive: 10 plays, 75 yards, 2:17.**

**Top passers**

- SEA – Geno Smith – 25/40, 215 yards, TD, INT
- KC – Patrick Mahomes – 16/28, 224 yards, 2 TD

**Top rushers**

- SEA – Kenneth Walker III – 26 rushes, 107 yards
- KC – Isiah Pacheco – 14 rushes, 58 yards

**Top receivers**

- SEA – DK Metcalf – 7 receptions, 81 yards
- KC – Travis Kelce – 6 receptions, 113 yards

==== Week 17: vs. New York Jets ====
Week 17: New York Jets at Seattle Seahawks – Game summary

Quarter	1	2	3	4	Total
Jets	3	3	0	0	**6**
**Seahawks**	10	7	3	3	**23**

at Lumen Field, Seattle, Washington

- Date: January 1
- Game time: 1:05 p.m. PST
- Game weather: Partly sunny, 46 °F (8 °C)
- Game attendance: 68,827
- Referee: Ronald Torbert
- TV announcers (Fox): Chris Myers, Robert Smith, and Jennifer Hale
- Recap, Game Book

Game information

**First quarter**

- SEA – Colby Parkinson 12-yard pass from Geno Smith (Jason Myers kick), 13:25. Seahawks 7–0. **Drive: 3 plays, 73 yards, 1:35.**
- SEA – Jason Myers 25-yard field goal, 6:37. Seahawks 10–0. **Drive: 9 plays, 57 yards, 4:36.**
- NYJ – Greg Zuerlein 44-yard field goal, 2:19. Seahawks 10–3. **Drive: 9 plays, 49 yards, 4:18.**

**Second quarter**

- SEA – Tyler Mabry 7-yard pass from Geno Smith (Jason Myers kick), 14:15. Seahawks 17–3. **Drive: 7 plays, 75 yards, 3:04.**
- NYJ – Greg Zuerlein 44-yard field goal, 8:00. Seahawks 17–6. **Drive: 11 plays, 49 yards, 6:15.**

**Third quarter**

- SEA – Jason Myers 31-yard field goal, 6:03. Seahawks 20–6. **Drive: 13 plays, 40 yards, 5:57.**

**Fourth quarter**

- SEA – Jason Myers 31-yard field goal, 5:41. Seahawks 23–6. **Drive: 7 plays, 11 yards, 3:36.**

**Top passers**

- NYJ – Mike White – 23/46, 240 yards, 2 INT
- SEA – Geno Smith – 18/29, 183 yards, 2 TD

**Top rushers**

- NYJ – Ty Johnson – 8 rushes, 46 yards
- SEA – Kenneth Walker III – 23 rushes, 133 yards

**Top receivers**

- NYJ – Tyler Conklin – 6 receptions, 80 yards
- SEA – Colby Parkinson – 5 receptions, 36 yards, TD

==== Week 18: vs. Los Angeles Rams ====
Week 18: Los Angeles Rams at Seattle Seahawks – Game summary

Quarter	1	2	3	4	OT	Total
Rams	3	10	3	0	0	**16**
**Seahawks**	6	0	7	3	3	**19**

at Lumen Field, Seattle, Washington

- Date: January 8
- Game time: 1:25 p.m. PST
- Game weather: Rain, 47 °F (8 °C)
- Game attendance: 68,660
- Referee: Craig Wrolstad
- TV announcers (Fox): Kevin Kugler, Mark Sanchez and Laura Okmin
- Recap, Game Book

Game information

**First quarter**

- LAR – Matt Gay 22-yard field goal, 13:28. Rams 3–0. **Drive: 4 plays, 7 yards, 1:22.**
- SEA – Jason Myers 37-yard field goal, 7:09. Tied 3-3. **Drive: 11 plays, 56 yards, 6:19.**
- SEA – Jason Myers 36-yard field goal, 0:15. Seahawks 6–3. **Drive: 8 plays, 31 yards, 4:45.**

**Second quarter**

- LAR – Matt Gay 45-yard field goal, 11:58. Tied 6–6. **Drive: 7 plays, 48 yards, 3:17.**
- LAR – Tutu Atwell 11-yard rush (Matt Gay kick), 0:39. Rams 13–6. **Drive: 9 plays, 87 yards, 3:00.**

**Third quarter**

- SEA – Geno Smith 36-yard pass to Tyler Lockett (Jason Myers kick), 9:09. **Tied 13–13. Drive: 5 plays, 88 yards, 2:22.**
- LAR – Matt Gay 38-yard field goal, 4:13. Rams 16–13. **Drive: 9 plays,62 yards, 4:56.**

**Fourth quarter**

- SEA – Jason Myers 22-yard field goal, 2:19. Tied 16–16. **Drive: 16 plays, 82 yards, 7:16.**

**Overtime**

- SEA – Jason Myers 32-yard field goal, 4:34. Seahawks 19–16. **Drive: 8 plays, 50 yards, 3:50.**

**Top passers**

- LAR – Baker Mayfield – 13/26, 147 yards, INT
- SEA – Geno Smith – 19/31, 213 yards, TD, 2 INT

**Top rushers**

- LAR – Cam Akers – 21 rushes, 104 yards
- SEA – Kenneth Walker III – 29 rushes, 114 yards

**Top receivers**

- LAR – Van Jefferson – 3 receptions, 61 yards
- SEA – Tyler Lockett – 4 receptions, 54 yards

With the win, the Seahawks swept the Rams for the first time since 2013, and with the Detroit Lions' win over the Green Bay Packers later on, the Seahawks clinched the #7 seed in the NFC.

=== Standings ===
==== Division ====
NFC West
	W	L	T	PCT	DIV	CONF	PF	PA	STK
^{(2)} San Francisco 49ers	13	4	0	.765	6–0	10–2	450	277	W10
^{(7)} Seattle Seahawks	9	8	0	.529	4–2	6–6	407	401	W2
Los Angeles Rams	5	12	0	.294	1–5	3–9	307	384	L2
Arizona Cardinals	4	13	0	.235	1–5	3–9	340	449	L7

==== Conference ====
NFC
#	Team	Division	W	L	T	PCT	DIV	CONF	SOS	SOV	STK
**Division leaders**
1	Philadelphia Eagles	East	14	3	0	.824	4–2	9–3	.474	.460	W1
2 (Note: San Francisco claimed the No. 2 seed over Minnesota based on conference record (10–2 vs. 8–4).)	San Francisco 49ers	West	13	4	0	.765	6–0	10–2	.417	.414	W10
3	Minnesota Vikings	North	13	4	0	.765	4–2	8–4	.474	.425	W1
4	Tampa Bay Buccaneers	South	8	9	0	.471	4–2	8–4	.503	.426	L1
**Wild cards**
5	Dallas Cowboys	East	12	5	0	.706	4–2	8–4	.507	.485	L1
6	New York Giants	East	9	7	1	.559	1–4–1	4–7–1	.526	.395	L1
7 (Note: Seattle finished ahead of Detroit based on head-to-head victory, claiming the 7th and final playoff spot.)	Seattle Seahawks	West	9	8	0	.529	4–2	6–6	.462	.382	W2
**Did not qualify for the postseason**
8	Detroit Lions	North	9	8	0	.529	5–1	7–5	.535	.451	W2
9	Washington Commanders	East	8	8	1	.500	2–3–1	5–6–1	.536	.449	W1
10	Green Bay Packers	North	8	9	0	.471	3–3	6–6	.524	.449	L1
11 (Note: Carolina finished ahead of New Orleans and Atlanta based on head-to-head record (3–1 vs. 2–2/1–3).)	Carolina Panthers	South	7	10	0	.412	4–2	6–6	.474	.437	W1
12 (Note: New Orleans finished ahead of Atlanta based on head-to-head sweep.)	New Orleans Saints	South	7	10	0	.412	2–4	5–7	.507	.462	L1
13	Atlanta Falcons	South	7	10	0	.412	2–4	6–6	.467	.429	W2
14	Los Angeles Rams	West	5	12	0	.294	1–5	3–9	.517	.341	L2
15	Arizona Cardinals	West	4	13	0	.235	1–5	3–9	.529	.368	L7
16	Chicago Bears	North	3	14	0	.176	0–6	1–11	.571	.480	L10
**Tiebreakers** (Note: When breaking ties for three or more teams under the NFL's rules, they are first broken within divisions, then comparing only the highest-ranked remaining team from each division.)

== Postseason ==
=== Schedule ===
Round	Date	Opponent (seed)	Result	Record	Venue	Recap
Wild Card	January 14	at San Francisco 49ers (2)	L 23–41	0–1	Levi's Stadium	Recap

=== Game summaries ===
==== NFC Wild Card Playoffs: at (2) San Francisco 49ers ====
NFC Wild Card Playoffs: (7) Seattle Seahawks at (2) San Francisco 49ers – Game summary

Quarter	1	2	3	4	Total
Seahawks	0	17	0	6	23
49ers	10	6	7	18	41

at Levi's Stadium, Santa Clara, California

- Date: January 14, 2023
- Game time: 1:30 p.m. PST
- Game weather: Rain, 57 °F (14 °C)
- Game attendance: 71,299
- Referee: Alex Kemp
- TV announcers (Fox): Joe Davis, Daryl Johnston, Pam Oliver, and Kristina Pink
- Recap, Game Book

Game information

First quarter

- SF – Robbie Gould 34-yard field goal, 10:13. 49ers 3–0. Drive: 7 plays, 48 yards, 2:22.
- SF – Christian McCaffrey 3-yard pass from Brock Purdy (Robbie Gould kick), 5:11. 49ers 10–0. Drive: 5 plays, 85 yards, 2:51.

Second quarter

- SEA – Kenneth Walker III 7-yard run (Jason Myers kick), 13:14. 49ers 10–7. Drive: 14 plays, 78 yards, 6:57.
- SF – Robbie Gould 33-yard field goal, 7:41. 49ers 13–7. Drive: 10 plays, 60 yards, 5:33.
- SEA – DK Metcalf 50-yard pass from Geno Smith (Jason Myers kick), 5:01. Seahawks 14–13. Drive: 5 plays, 71 yards, 2:40.
- SF – Robbie Gould 46-yard field goal, 0:17. 49ers 16–14. Drive: 8 plays, 49 yards, 0:55.
- SEA – Jason Myers 56-yard field goal, 0:00. Seahawks 17–16. Drive: 2 plays, 24 yards, 0:13.

Third quarter

- SF – Brock Purdy 1-yard run (Robbie Gould kick), 7:15. 49ers 23–17. Drive: 13 plays, 75 yards, 7:45.

Fourth quarter

- SF – Elijah Mitchell 7-yard pass from Brock Purdy (Brock Purdy–George Kittle pass), 14:02. 49ers 31–17. Drive: 7 plays, 70 yards, 3:23.
- SF – Deebo Samuel 74-yard pass from Brock Purdy (Robbie Gould kick), 10:51. 49ers 38–17. Drive: 2 plays, 76 yards, 0:54.
- SF – Robbie Gould 31-yard field goal, 4:56. 49ers 41–17. Drive: 10 plays, 24 yards, 5:49.
- SEA – DK Metcalf 3-yard pass from Geno Smith (pass failed), 1:48. 49ers 41–23. Drive: 15 plays, 76 yards, 3:08.

Top passers

- SEA – Geno Smith – 25/35, 253 yards, 2 TD, INT
- SF – Brock Purdy – 18/30, 332 yards, 3 TD

Top rushers

- SEA – Kenneth Walker III – 15 rushes, 63 yards, TD
- SF – Christian McCaffrey – 15 rush, 119 yards

Top receivers

- SEA – DK Metcalf – 10 receptions, 136 yards, 2 TD
- SF – Deebo Samuel – 6 receptions, 133 yards, TD

The game was a back-and-forth contest in the first half until the 49ers took control in the second half and won by 18 points. This would be Seattle's last playoff game until 2025.
