= Riq Woolen =

American football player (born 1999)

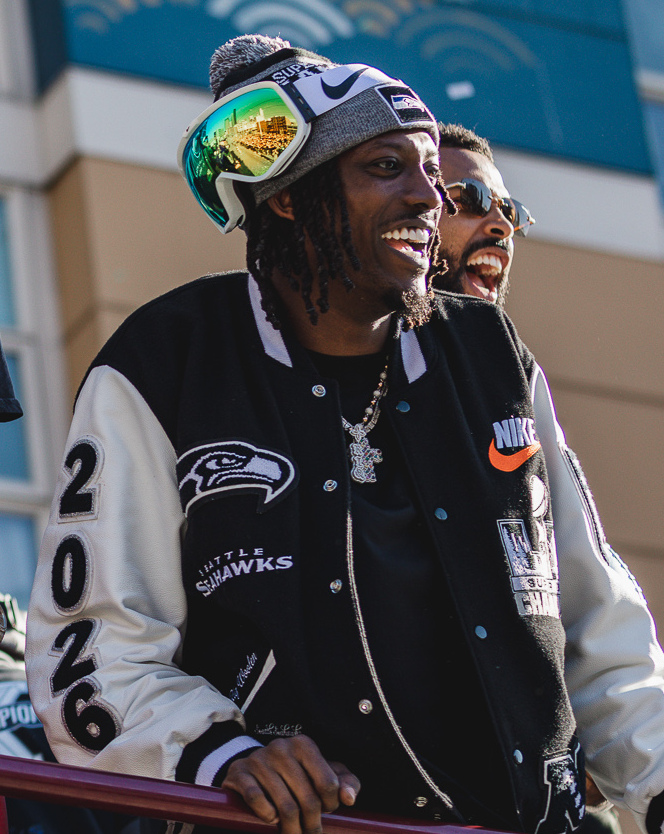
- Woolen with the Seattle Seahawks in 2026

No. 2 – Philadelphia Eagles
- Position: Cornerback
- Roster status: Active

Personal information
- Born: May 2, 1999 (age 27); Fort Worth, Texas, U.S.
- Listed height: 6 ft 4 in (1.93 m)
- Listed weight: 210 lb (95 kg)

Career information
- High school: Arlington Heights (Fort Worth)
- College: UTSA (2017–2021)
- NFL draft: 2022: 5th round, 153rd overall pick

Career history
- Seattle Seahawks (2022–2025); Philadelphia Eagles (2026–present)

Awards and highlights
- Super Bowl champion (LX); Pro Bowl (2022); NFL interceptions co-leader (2022); PFWA All-Rookie Team (2022)

Career NFL statistics as of Week 9, 2026
- Total tackles: 237
- Forced fumbles: 2
- Fumble recoveries: 5
- Pass deflections: 61
- Interceptions: 12
- Defensive touchdowns: 1
- Stats at Pro Football Reference

Tariq Woolen (born May 2, 1999) is an American professional football cornerback for the Philadelphia Eagles of the National Football League (NFL). He played college football for the UTSA Roadrunners and was selected by the Seattle Seahawks in the fifth round of the 2022 NFL draft. Woolen made the Pro Bowl and was the NFL interceptions co-leader as a rookie in 2022.

== Early life ==
Woolen grew up in Fort Worth, Texas and attended Arlington Heights High School. He was rated a three-star recruit and committed to play college football at the University of Texas at San Antonio (UTSA) over offers from North Texas, Houston, and Texas State.

== College career ==
Woolen redshirted his freshman season at UTSA. As a redshirt freshman wide receiver, he caught 15 passes for 158 yards and one touchdown. Woolen started the first three games of his redshirt sophomore season before moving to the cornerback position.

Woolen became a starter during his redshirt junior season and finished the year with 35 tackles, 2.5 tackles for loss, and 1.5 sacks with four passes broken up and one interception. Woolen had 25 tackles, 5 passes broken up, and one interception as a redshirt senior. After the conclusion of his college career, Woolen was invited to play in the 2022 Senior Bowl.

== Professional career ==
=== Pre-draft ===
At the 2022 NFL Combine, Woolen ran a 4.26-second 40-yard dash, tied for fourth-best in Combine history at the time and fastest for a player over six foot. Kevin Hanson of Sports Illustrated had Woolen ranked as the eighth best cornerback available in the draft.Scouts Inc. listed Woolen as the ninth best cornerback prospect (81st overall) on their big board. NFL.com media analyst Daniel Jeremiah had him ranked as the 10th best cornerback (79th overall) in the draft. Cory Giddings of Bleacher Report ranked him as the 10th best cornerback prospect (84th overall) in the draft. Josh Edwards of CBSSports.com had him ranked as the 13th best cornerback (89th overall) available in the draft. NFL media analyst Lance Zierlein projected Woolen to be selected in either the second or third round of the 2022 NFL Draft.

External videos
- Riq Woolen's 40 edges out Jalen Ramsey
- Woolen discusses 4.26s 40-yard dash

Pre-draft measurables
Height	Weight	Arm length	Hand span	Wingspan	40-yard dash	10-yard split	20-yard split	20-yard shuttle	Three-cone drill	Vertical jump	Broad jump	Bench press
6 ft 4 1/8 in (1.93 m)	205 lb (93 kg)	33 5/8 in (0.85 m)	9 1/8 in (0.23 m)	6 ft 6 5/8 in (2.00 m)	4.26 s	1.49 s	2.49 s	4.30 s	7.10 s	42.0 in (1.07 m)	10 ft 11 in (3.33 m)	12 reps
All values from NFL Combine/Pro Day

=== Seattle Seahawks ===
==== 2022 ====
The Seattle Seahawks selected Woolen in the fifth round (153rd overall) of the 2022 NFL draft. He was the 21st cornerback drafted in 2022 and was the second cornerback drafted by the Seahawks, following fourth round pick (102nd overall) Coby Bryant.

External videos
- Seahawks select Tariq Woolen No. 153
- Tariq Woolen post-draft press conference
- The Call: Seahawks call Tariq Woolen

On May 6, 2022, the Seahawks signed Woolen to a four–year, $3.99 million rookie contract that included a signing bonus of $332,216.

Throughout training camp, Woolen competed to be a starting cornerback against Artie Burns, Coby Bryant, Tre Brown, Mike Jackson, Justin Coleman, and John Reid. On August 31, 2022, the Seahawks unexpectedly traded Sidney Jones to the Las Vegas Raiders, although he was expected to return as a starting cornerback. Head coach Pete Carroll subsequently named Woolen the No. 1 starting cornerback and paired him with Mike Jackson.

On September 12, 2022, Woolen made his professional regular season debut and earned his first career start in the Seattle Seahawks' home-opener against the Denver Broncos and made one solo tackle during their 17–16 victory. On September 25, 2022, Woolen made four combined tackles (three solo), a pass deflection, and had his first career interception on a pass by Marcus Mariota to wide receiver Drake London during a 23–27 loss to the Atlanta Falcons. In Week 4, Woolen recorded five combined tackles (four solo), a pass deflection, and returned an interception on a pass thrown by Jared Goff to tight end T. J. Hockenson 40–yards to score his first career touchdown on the opening play in the second half of a 48–45 win at the Detroit Lions. In Week 5, he had his third consecutive game with an interception after picking off a pass thrown by Andy Dalton to wide receiver Tre'Quan Smith, while also recording four combined tackles (three solo), a pass deflection, and recovering a fumble as the Seahawks lost 32–29 at the New Orleans Saints. On October 16, 2022, Woolen made five solo tackles, a pass deflection, a fumble recovery, and had his fourth consecutive game with an interception on a pass by Kyler Murray as the Seahawks defeated the Arizona Cardinals 19–9 in Week 6. He became the only rookie over the prior 10 years to have four consecutive games with an interception. He was named National Football Conference Defensive Player of the Week for Week 6. On December 4, 2022, Woolen collected a season-high seven combined tackles (six solo), set a season-high with three pass deflections, and had his sixth interception of the season on a pass thrown by John Wolford to wide receiver Kyren Williams during a 27–23 win at the Los Angeles Rams.

For his rookie season, Woolen started in all 17 games with a total 63 combined tackles (46 solo), 16 pass deflections, and tied for most interceptions in 2022 with six. Pro Football Focus gave Woolen an overall grade of 69.1 in 2022, which ranked 35th among 120 qualifying cornerbacks. He earned a coverage grade of 74.1 from PFF, ranking 25th among 120 cornerbacks. By season's end he was named to the Pro Football Writers of America All-Rookie Team, earned Pro Bowl honors, and was a finalist for NFL Defensive Rookie of the Year.

The Seattle Seahawks finished the 2022 NFL season second in the NFC West with a 9–8 record, clinching a Wildcard berth. On January 14, 2023, Woolen started in his first career playoff game and made three solo tackles and a pass deflection as the Seahawks lost 23–41 at the San Francisco 49ers in the NFC Wild-card Game.

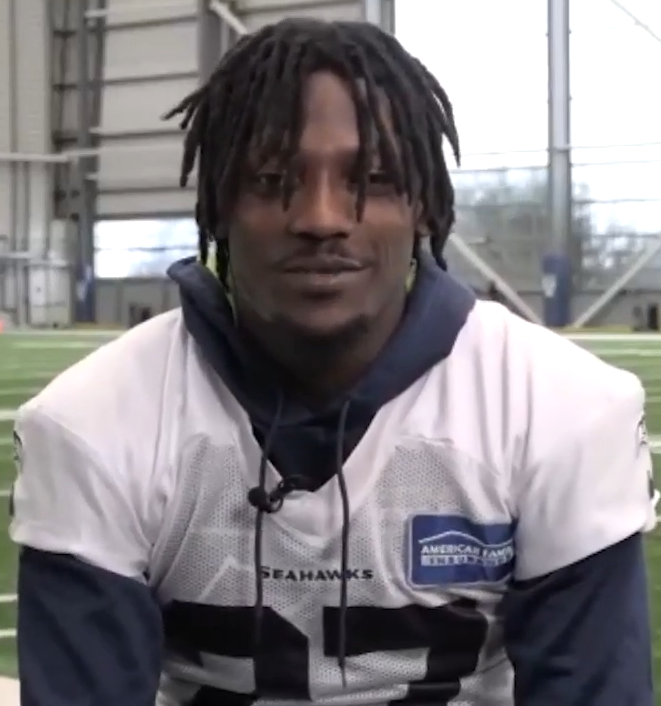
Woolen in 2022

==== 2023 ====
He returned as a starting cornerback under defensive coordinator Clint Hurtt in 2023 and was paired with rookie first-round pick Devon Witherspoon. He was inactive for the Seahawks' 37–27 victory against the Carolina Panthers in Week 3 due to a chest injury. In Week 11, he made three combined tackles (two solo), tied his season-high of two pass deflections, and intercepted a pass thrown by Matthew Stafford to wide receiver Austin Trammell during a 16–17 loss at the Los Angeles Rams. On November 30, 2023, Woolen collected a season-high eight solo tackles and had two pass deflections as the Seahawks lost 35–41 at the Dallas Cowboys. He finished with 53 combined tackles (42 solo), two interceptions, 11 passes defended, and two fumble recoveries in 16 games and 16 starts. He received an overall grade of 67.1 from Pro Football Focus, ranking 53rd among all qualifying cornerbacks in 2023. His coverage grade of 75.0 from PFF was ranked 27th.

==== 2024 ====
On January 31, 2024, the Seahawks announced the hiring of Baltimore Ravens' defensive coordinator Mike Macdonald as their head coach following the departure of Pete Carroll. Defensive coordinator Aden Durde chose to retain Woolen and Devon Witherspoon as the starting cornerbacks to begin the season.

On September 8, 2024, Woolen started in the Seahawks' home-opener against the Denver Broncos and made three combined tackles (one solo), two pass deflections, and intercepted a pass by Bo Nix to wide receiver Courtland Sutton during a 26–20 victory. He was inactive for two games (Weeks 6–7) due to an ankle injury. In Week 14, he collected a season-high eight combined tackles (five solo) and broke up a pass during a 30–18 win at the Arizona Cardinals. On December 22, 2024, Woolen had two combined tackles (one solo) and a season-high three pass deflections during a 24–27 loss against the Minnesota Vikings. The following week, Woolen recorded one solo tackle, a pass deflection, and had a game-sealing interception on a pass by Caleb Williams to wide receiver D. J. Moore in the last 20 seconds in the fourth quarter of a 6–3 victory at the Chicago Bears in Week 17. He finished the season with 46 combined tackles (32 solo), 14 pass deflections, and three interceptions in 15 games and 14 starts. He received an overall grade of 67.9 from Pro Football Focus in 2024.

==== 2025 ====
Woolen finished the 2025 season with 41 total tackles (33 solo), one interception, and 12 passes defended. He was a member of the Seahawks team that won Super Bowl LX. He had four total tackles in the 29–13 win over the New England Patriots.

=== Philadelphia Eagles ===
On March 12, 2026, Woolen signed a one-year deal with the Philadelphia Eagles worth up to $15 million.

== NFL career statistics ==
=== Regular season ===
Legend
	Won the Super Bowl
	Led the league
**Bold**	Career high

Year	Team	Games		Tackles						Interceptions						Fumbles					
Year	Team	GP	GS	Cmb	Solo	Ast	TFL	Sck	Sfty	PD	Int	Yds	Y/I	Lng	TD	FF	Fmb	FR	Yds	Y/R	TD
2022	SEA	17	17	**63**	**46**	**17**	**1**	0.0	0	**16**	**6**	**47**	7.8	**40**	**1**	0	**1**	**3**	**8**	**2.7**	0
2023	SEA	16	15	53	42	11	**1**	0.0	0	11	2	0	0.0	0	0	0	0	2	1	0.5	0
2024	SEA	15	14	46	32	14	0	0.0	0	14	3	11	3.7	7	0	**1**	0	0	0	0.0	0
2025	SEA	16	7	41	33	8	**1**	0.0	0	12	1	30	**30.0**	30	0	0	**1**	0	0	0.0	0
2026	PHI	9	9	34	27	7	0	0.0	0	8	0	0	0.0	0	0	1	0	0	0	0.0	0
Career		73	62	237	180	57	3	0.0	0	61	12	88	7.3	40	1	2	2	5	9	1.8	0

=== Postseason ===
Year	Team	Games		Tackles						Interceptions						Fumbles					
Year	Team	GP	GS	Cmb	Solo	Ast	TFL	Sck	Sfty	PD	Int	Yds	Y/I	Lng	TD	FF	Fmb	FR	Yds	Y/R	TD
2022	SEA	1	1	3	3	0	0	0.0	0	1	0	0	0	0	0	0	0	0	0	0	0
2025	SEA	3	0	**8**	**6**	**2**	0	0.0	0	**4**	0	0	0	0	0	0	0	0	0	0	0
Career		4	1	11	9	2	0	0.0	0	5	0	0	0	0	0	0	0	0	0	0	0
