= Mike Jackson (cornerback) =

American football player (born 1997)

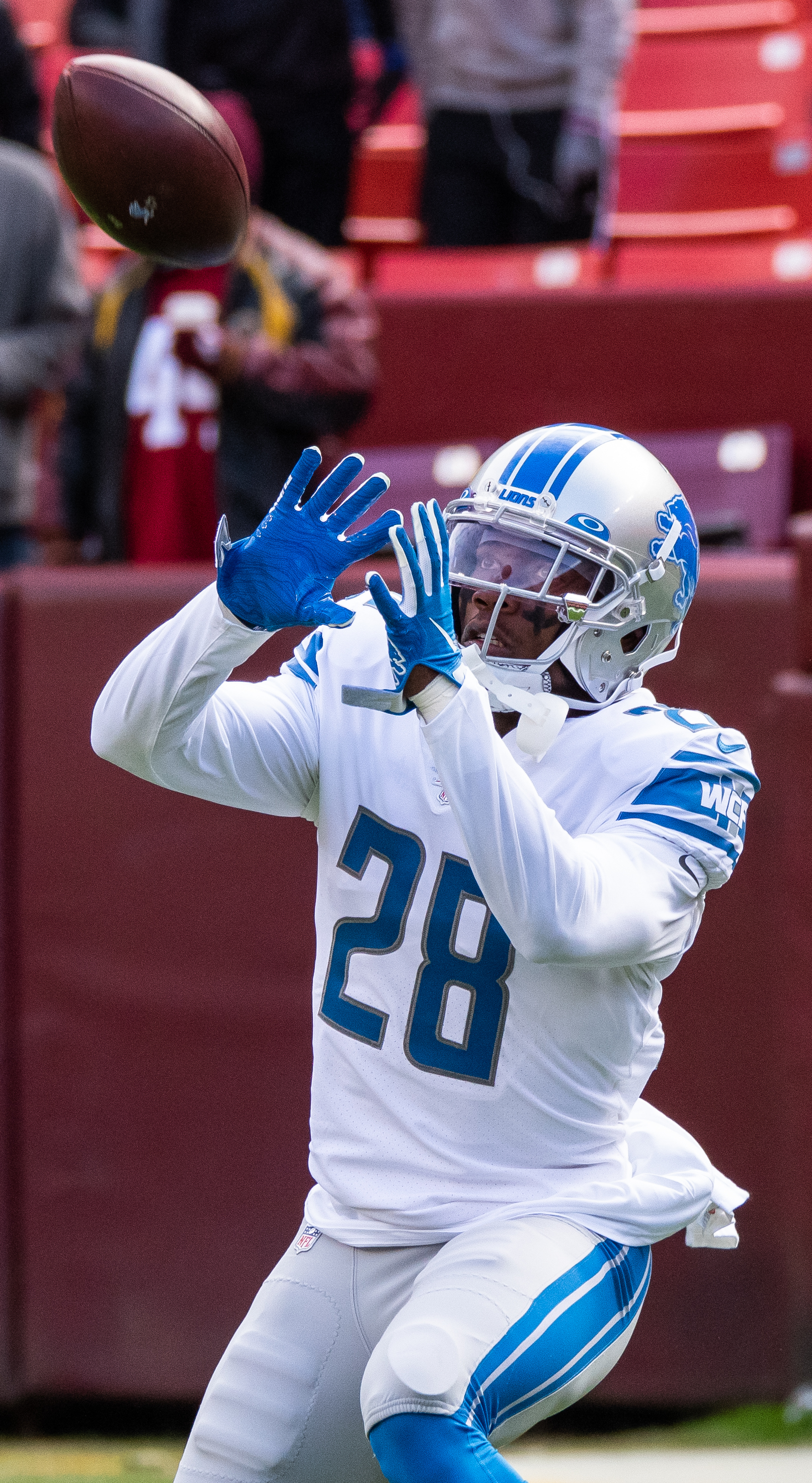
- Jackson with the Detroit Lions in 2019

No. 2 – Carolina Panthers
- Position: Cornerback
- Roster status: Active

Personal information
- Born: January 10, 1997 (age 29); Frankfurt, Germany
- Listed height: 6 ft 1 in (1.85 m)
- Listed weight: 210 lb (95 kg)

Career information
- High school: Spain Park (Hoover, Alabama, U.S.)
- College: Miami (FL) (2015–2018)
- NFL draft: 2019: 5th round, 158th overall pick

Career history
- Dallas Cowboys (2019)*; Detroit Lions (2019); New England Patriots (2020); Seattle Seahawks (2021–2023); Carolina Panthers (2024–present)
- * Offseason or practice squad member only

Awards and highlights
- Second-team All-ACC (2017)

Career NFL statistics as of 2025
- Total tackles: 256
- Forced fumbles: 1
- Fumble recoveries: 2
- Pass deflections: 55
- Interceptions: 7
- Touchdowns: 2
- Stats at Pro Football Reference

Michael Jackson (born January 10, 1997) is an American professional football cornerback for the Carolina Panthers of the National Football League (NFL). He played college football for the Miami Hurricanes and was selected by the Dallas Cowboys in the fifth round of the 2019 NFL draft.

== Early life ==
Jackson attended Spain Park High School. In the summer before his senior season, Jackson said that he wanted to go out of his home state of Alabama to play college football. During his senior season in 2014, he was named co-Alabama High School Player of the Week in mid-October after preserving a 14–13 win over Vestavia Hills High School by blocking an extra point and field goal in the fourth quarter.

Jackson committed to University of Miami in late October 2014 after visiting the campus the previous June, choosing the school over Minnesota, Georgia, LSU and Nebraska. He was rated as a three-star recruit by 247Sports.com.

== College career ==
As a freshman, he played mainly on special teams. As a sophomore, he was a backup, tallying 7 tackles (2 solo), one pass breakup and one fumble recovery.

As a junior, he appeared in all 13 games with 10 starts. He collected 43 tackles, 4 interceptions (tied for the team lead) and 5 pass breakups. He was on a roll in October, intercepting a pass against Florida State University and two more two weeks later against Syracuse University.

On January 5, 2018, Jackson announced on his Twitter account that he would return to the Hurricanes for his senior season. He was projected in some publications to go in the first round of the 2019 NFL draft. As a senior, he started all 13 games, posting 42 tackles (3.5 tackles for loss), 2.5 sacks and 6 pass breakups (second on the team). After his senior season, Jackson was named honorable mention all-Atlantic Coast Conference.

== Professional career ==
Pre-draft measurables
| Height | Weight | Arm length | Hand span | Wingspan | 40-yard dash | 10-yard split | 20-yard split | 20-yard shuttle | Three-cone drill | Vertical jump | Broad jump | Bench press |
|---|---|---|---|---|---|---|---|---|---|---|---|---|
| 6 ft 0 5/8 in (1.84 m) | 210 lb (95 kg) | 32 1/2 in (0.83 m) | 9 3/4 in (0.25 m) | 6 ft 5 1/4 in (1.96 m) | 4.45 s | 1.49 s | 2.64 s | 4.12 s | 7.12 s | 40.5 in (1.03 m) | 10 ft 10 in (3.30 m) | 13 reps |
All values from NFL Combine

=== Dallas Cowboys ===
The Dallas Cowboys selected Jackson in the fifth round (158th overall) of the 2019 NFL draft. He was the 17th cornerback drafted.

External videos
- Cowboys draft Mike Jackson no. 158th

==== 2019 season ====
On May 10, 2019, the Dallas Cowboys signed Jackson to a four–year, $2.82 million rookie contract that included a signing bonus of $303,420. Throughout training camp, he competed to be a starting cornerback against Anthony Brown, Jourdan Lewis, and Chidobe Awuzie under Cowboys' defensive coordinator Rod Marinelli. On August 31, the Cowboys waived Jackson as part of their final roster cuts. On September 2, the Cowboys re-signed him to the practice squad after he cleared waivers.

=== Detroit Lions ===
On October 30, 2019, the Detroit Lions signed Jackson from the Dallas Cowboys' practice squad and added him to their active roster. Head coach Matt Patricia named him a backup and listed him as the seventh cornerback on the depth chart, behind Darius Slay, Justin Coleman, Rashaan Melvin, Mike Ford, Dee Virgin, and Jamal Agnew. He was inactive as a healthy scratch for the first three games (Weeks 9–11). On November 24, Jackson made his professional regular season debut, but was limited to two snaps on special teams as the Lions lost 16–19 at the Washington Redskins. He subsequently remained inactive for the last five games (Weeks 13–17) of the season.

==== 2020 season ====
Jackson entered training camp as a backup cornerback and competed for a roster spot against Mike Ford, Amani Oruwariye, Darryl Roberts, and Tony McRae. On August 9, 2020, the Detroit Lions announced their intention to waive Jackson.

=== New England Patriots ===
On August 9, 2020, the Detroit Lions chose not to waive Jackson and instead, traded him to the New England Patriots for a conditional seventh-round pick in the 2022 NFL draft. On September 3, the Patriots waived Jackson as part of their final roster cuts. On September 28, the Patriots re-signed him to their practice squad. On January 2, 2021, Jackson was promoted from the practice squad to the active roster. He played in the season finale against the New York Jets and had one tackle.

On August 31, 2021, the New England Patriots waived Jackson as part of their final roster cuts.

=== Seattle Seahawks ===
On September 2, 2021, Jackson was signed to the Seattle Seahawks' practice squad. On December 28, the Seahawks activated Jackson from their practice squad and added him to their active roster. He was activated due to injuries to multiple players, including Gavin Heslop, Sidney Jones, Tre Brown, and Blessuan Austin. Upon his addition to the active roster, head coach Pete Carroll named him a backup and listed him as the third cornerback on the depth chart, behind starting cornerbacks D. J. Reed and John Reid.

On January 2, 2022, Jackson made his debut with the Seahawks and had one tackle and made two pass deflections during a 51-29 victory against the Detroit Lions. He only appeared in two games in 2021 and finished with two combined tackles (one solo) and two pass deflections.

==== 2022 season ====
On January 10, 2022, the Seattle Seahawks signed Jackson to a reserve/future contract. Defensive coordinator Ken Norton Jr. was fired after the 2021 NFL season and defensive line coach Clint Hurtt was promoted to defensive coordinator as his replacement.

Throughout training camp, Jackson competed against Artie Burns, Coby Bryant, Tre Brown, Tariq Woolen, Justin Coleman, and John Reid to earn a role as a starting cornerback. On August 31, the Seahawks unexpectedly traded Sidney Jones to the Las Vegas Raiders, although he was expected to start at cornerback. Head coach Pete Carroll named Jackson the No. 2 starting cornerback to begin the season and paired him with rookie Tariq Woolen. Between Woolen and Jackson, only Jackson had experience that was limited to 29 snaps on defense on two games.

On September 12, Jackson earned his first career start in the Seahawks' home-opener against the Denver Broncos and made four solo tackles, one pass deflection, and had two fumble recoveries during a 17–16 victory. In week 2, Jackson recorded six combined tackles (five solo) and scored his first career touchdown on a blocked field goal return after teammate Tariq Woolen blocked a 20–yard field goal attempt by Robbie Gould, that Jackson recovered and returned for an 86–yard touchdown in the third quarter of a 7–27 loss at the San Francisco 49ers. In Week 8, he set a season-high with seven solo tackles and with three pass deflections during a 27–13 win against the New York Giants. On January 1, 2023, Jackson made four combined tackles (three solo), one pass deflection, and had his first career interception on a pass attempt thrown by Mike White to wide receiver Garrett Wilson during a 22–6 win against the New York Jets. He started all 17 games in 2022 and had a total of 75 combined tackles (63 solo), 12 pass deflections, two fumble recoveries, one interception, and one touchdown. Jackson received an overall grade of 60.2 from Pro Football Focus for his performance during the regular season.

==== 2023 season ====
Jackson entered training camp projected to be demoted to a backup cornerback due to the progression of second-year cornerbacks Tariq Woolen and Coby Bryant as well as the arrival of 2023 first-round pick (fifth overall) Devon Witherspoon. He competed against Tre Brown, Kyu Blu Kelly, and Artie Burns to be the fourth cornerback on the depth chart. Head coach Pete Carroll named him a backup and listed him as the fifth cornerback on the depth chart to begin the season, behind Tariq Woolen, Devon Witherspoon, Coby Bryant, and Tre Brown.

In Week 3, Jackson set a season-high with six solo tackles and made one pass deflection during a 37–27 victory against the Carolina Panthers. He was named a starting cornerback beginning in week 15 after Devon Witherspoon suffered a lower back injury. In week 15, Jackson made four solo tackles and set a season-high with two pass deflections as the Seahawks defeated the Philadelphia Eagles 20–17. He finished the 2023 NFL season with 34 combined tackles (28 solo) and five pass deflections in 17 games and four starts. He received an overall grade of 77.0 from Pro Football Focus in 2023.

==== 2024 season ====
On January 31, 2024, the Seattle Seahawks announced their decision to hire Baltimore Ravens' defensive coordinator Mike Macdonald to be their new head coach after the departure of Pete Carroll. During training camp, Jackson competed against Tre Brown, Artie Burns, Nehemiah Pritchett, and D. J. James to be a primary backup cornerback.

=== Carolina Panthers ===
==== 2024 ====
On August 22, 2024, the Seahawks traded Jackson to the Carolina Panthers in exchange for rookie linebacker Michael Barrett. The week prior, the Panthers expected No. 2 starting cornerback Dane Jackson suffered a hamstring injury during practice and was expected to miss six weeks. Head coach Dave Canales and Jackson had previously known one another when they were both with the Seattle Seahawks from 2021 and 2022. Immediately upon his arrival, defensive coordinator Ejiro Evero named Jackson the No. 2 starting cornerback to begin the season and paired him with Jaycee Horn.

On September 22, Jackson made nine solo tackles, set a season-high with three pass deflections, and helped secure the Panthers' 36–22 victory at the Las Vegas Raiders after intercepting a pass by Gardner Minshew to wide receiver Davante Adams in the fourth quarter. On October 27, Jackson set a season-high with ten combined tackles (nine solo) as the Panthers lost 14–28 at the Denver Broncos. In week 18, Jackson had four combined tackles (one solo), made two pass deflections, and intercepted a pass by Michael Penix Jr. to wide receiver Ray-Ray McCloud and returned it for a season-long 19–yards during a 44–38 overtime victory at the Atlanta Falcons. He started all 17 games during the 2024 NFL season and finished with a total of 76 combined tackles (58 solo), 17 pass deflections, and two interceptions. He received an overall grade of 68.0 from Pro Football Focus, which ranked 64th among 222 qualifying cornerbacks in 2024.

==== 2025 ====
On March 12, 2025, the Carolina Panthers signed Jackson to a two–year, $10.50 million contract extension that includes $7.70 million guaranteed, $5.70 million guaranteed upon signing, and an initial signing bonus of $4.00 million. The agreement has a maximum value of $14.50 million with incentives included. In Week 13 against the Los Angeles Rams, Jackson intercepted Matthew Stafford and returned the ball 48 yards for a touchdown. Jackson started all 17 games for Carolina during the regular season, recording 68 tackles, a forced fumble, four interceptions, and a league-leading 19 passes defended.

==== 2026 ====
On September 30, 2026, Jackson was placed on injured reserve after suffering a groin injury in Week 3. He was activated on November 21.

== NFL career statistics ==
Legend
| | Led the league |
| **Bold** | Career high |

=== Regular season ===
| Year | Team | Games | | Tackles | | | | | | Interceptions | | | | | | Fumbles | | | |
| Year | Team | GP | GS | Comb | Solo | Ast | Sck | TFL | Sfty | PD | Int | Yds | Avg | Lng | TD | FF | FR | Yds | TD |
|---|---|---|---|---|---|---|---|---|---|---|---|---|---|---|---|---|---|---|---|
| 2019 | DET | 1 | 0 | 0 | 0 | 0 | 0.0 | 0 | 0 | 0 | 0 | 0 | 0.0 | 0 | 0 | 0 | 0 | 0 | 0 |
| 2020 | NE | 1 | 0 | 1 | 1 | 0 | 0.0 | 0 | 0 | 0 | 0 | 0 | 0.0 | 0 | 0 | 0 | 0 | 0 | 0 |
| 2021 | SEA | 2 | 0 | 2 | 1 | 1 | 0.0 | 0 | 0 | 2 | 0 | 0 | 0.0 | 0 | 0 | 0 | 0 | 0 | 0 |
| 2022 | SEA | **17** | **17** | 75 | **63** | 12 | 0.0 | 3 | 0 | 12 | 1 | 22 | 22.0 | 22 | 0 | 0 | **2** | **8** | 0 |
| 2023 | SEA | **17** | 4 | 34 | 28 | 6 | 0.0 | 2 | 0 | 5 | 0 | 0 | 0.0 | 0 | 0 | 0 | 0 | 0 | 0 |
| 2024 | CAR | **17** | **17** | **76** | 58 | **18** | 0.0 | 3 | 0 | 17 | 2 | 20 | 10.0 | 19 | 0 | 0 | 0 | 0 | 0 |
| 2025 | CAR | **17** | **17** | 68 | 54 | 14 | 0.0 | **4** | 0 | **19** | **4** | **102** | **25.5** | **54** | **1** | **1** | 0 | 0 | 0 |
| Career | | 72 | 55 | 256 | 205 | 51 | 0.0 | 12 | 0 | 55 | 7 | 144 | 20.6 | 54 | 1 | 1 | 2 | 8 | 0 |

=== Postseason ===
| Year | Team | Games | | Tackles | | | | | | Interceptions | | | | | | Fumbles | | | |
| Year | Team | GP | GS | Comb | Solo | Ast | Sck | TFL | Sfty | PD | Int | Yds | Avg | Lng | TD | FF | FR | Yds | TD |
|---|---|---|---|---|---|---|---|---|---|---|---|---|---|---|---|---|---|---|---|
| 2022 | SEA | **1** | **1** | **5** | **2** | **3** | 0.0 | 0 | 0 | 1 | 0 | 0 | 0 | 0 | 0 | 0 | 0 | 0 | 0 |
| 2025 | CAR | **1** | **1** | 3 | 1 | 2 | 0.0 | 0 | 0 | **4** | **1** | 0 | 0 | 0 | 0 | 0 | 0 | 0 | 0 |
| Career | | 2 | 2 | 8 | 3 | 5 | 0.0 | 0 | 0 | 5 | 0 | 0 | 0 | 0 | 0 | 0 | 0 | 0 | 0 |

== Personal life ==
Jackson's son, Michael Jackson Jr., was born in April 2018.
