= 2025 Seattle Seahawks season =

American football team season

- Owner: Estate of Paul Allen
- General manager: John Schneider
- Head coach: Mike Macdonald
- Offensive coordinator: Klint Kubiak
- Defensive coordinator: Aden Durde
- Home stadium: Lumen Field

Results
- Record: 14–3
- Division place: 1st NFC West
- Playoffs: Won Divisional Playoffs (vs. 49ers) 41–6; Won NFC Championship (vs. Rams) 31–27; Won Super Bowl LX (vs. Patriots) 29–13
- All-Pros: 5: WR Jaxon Smith-Njigba (1st team); P Michael Dickson (2nd team); MLB Ernest Jones (2nd team); DT Leonard Williams (2nd team); CB Devon Witherspoon (2nd team)
- Pro Bowlers: 6: Selected but did not play due to participation in Super Bowl LX: QB Sam Darnold; DE DeMarcus Lawrence; RS Rashid Shaheed; WR Jaxon Smith-Njigba; DT Leonard Williams; CB Devon Witherspoon

Uniform
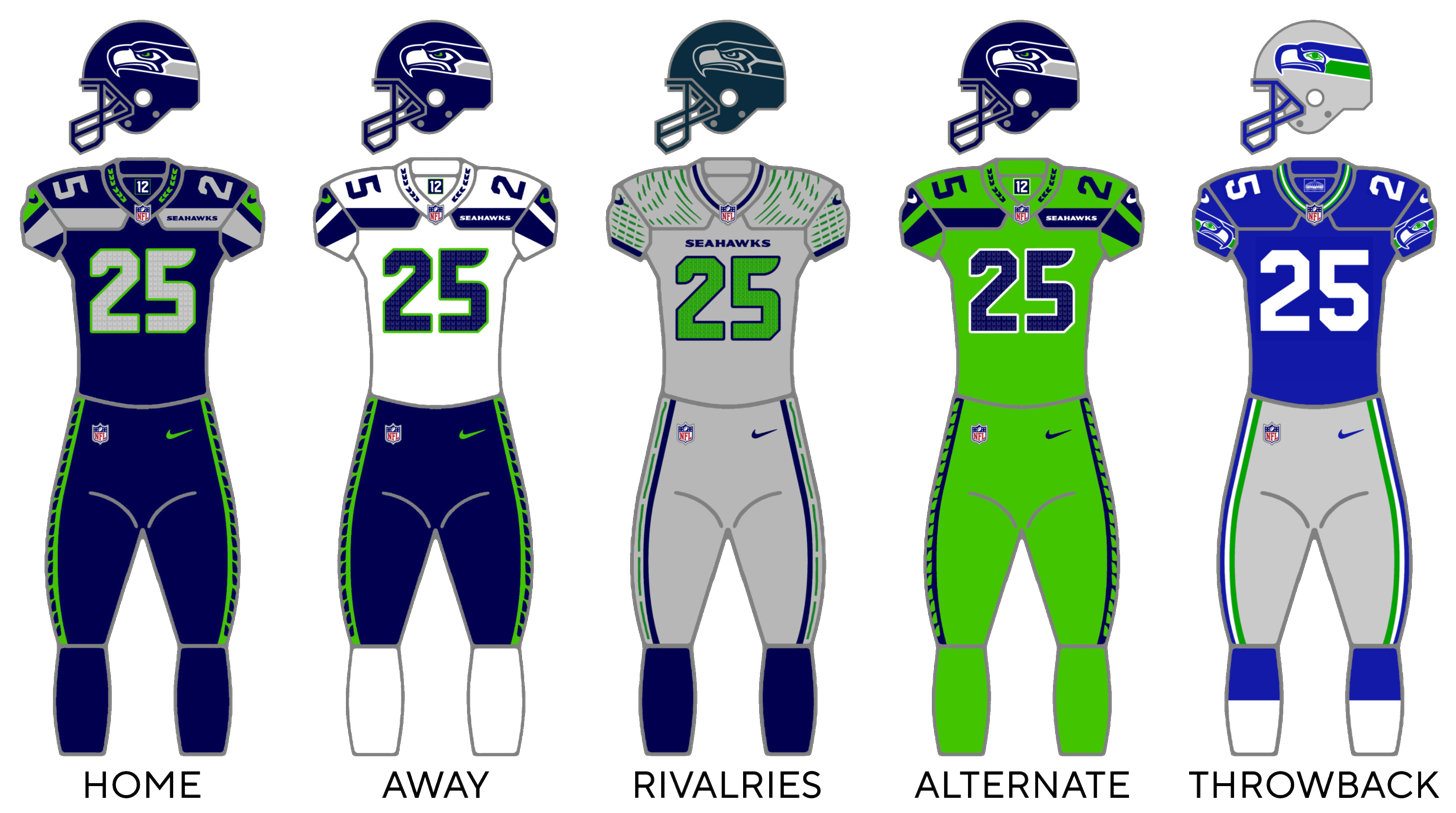

The 2025 season was the Seattle Seahawks' 50th in the National Football League (NFL), their 16th under general manager John Schneider, and their second under head coach Mike Macdonald. The Seahawks finished the regular season with a franchise-best 14–3 record, winning the NFC West for the first time since 2020 and securing the NFC’s No. 1 seed for the first time since 2014. They went on to win Super Bowl LX, defeating the New England Patriots 29–13 to capture their second Super Bowl championship and first since the 2013 season.

The offseason saw significant roster changes, as longtime players Tyler Lockett, Geno Smith, and DK Metcalf departed the team. Lockett was released and later signed with the Tennessee Titans, while Smith joined the Las Vegas Raiders and Metcalf was traded to the Pittsburgh Steelers. Key free agent additions included quarterback Sam Darnold, wide receiver Cooper Kupp, and linebacker DeMarcus Lawrence, and the team re-signed linebacker Ernest Jones IV to a three-year contract. On November 4, prior to the trade deadline, Seattle acquired All-Pro returner and wide receiver Rashid Shaheed from the New Orleans Saints.

Seattle improved upon their 10–7 record from 2024 and clinched a playoff berth in Week 16 with an overtime victory over the rival Los Angeles Rams on Thursday Night Football, ending a two-year postseason absence. The team won 13 games for the first time since 2013 and secured a franchise-record 14 regular-season victories with a 13–3 win over the San Francisco 49ers in Week 18. In a divisional round rematch against San Francisco, the Seahawks earned their first playoff victory since 2019 and advanced to their first NFC Championship Game since 2014. They became the first Super Bowl champion to complete an entire postseason without committing a turnover.

Individually, Jaxon Smith-Njigba was awarded Offensive Player of the Year and set a franchise single-season record with 1,793 receiving yards, surpassing DK Metcalf’s previous mark of 1,303 set in 2020. The Seahawks also posted a franchise-record point differential of +191, breaking the previous record of +186 established during the 2013 Super Bowl-winning season. The defense was the top scoring defense in the league and earned the nickname "The Dark Side".

NFL statistician Aaron Schatz, using the DVOA advanced metric, calculated that, play-for-play, the 2025 Seahawks were not only the best team in the NFL in 2025, but within the top 10 teams of all time. They are the third-highest ranked Super Bowl winning team, after only the 1985 Chicago Bears, and the 1991 Washington Redskins.

The Seattle Seahawks recorded the highest average home attendance among teams in the state of Washington, with 68,740 spectators per game. This was slightly ahead of the football team of the Washington Huskies, who averaged 68,238, 502 less than the Seahawks. After the season, the team's offensive coordinator, Klint Kubiak, was hired by the Las Vegas Raiders to be their head coach.

== The Dark Side ==
The Dark Side is a nickname used to refer to the Seahawks' defensive unit. The nickname originated within the locker room during the 2024 season, originally as the "death zone" before becoming the "Dark Side" by the start of the 2025 season. It was later referenced in media coverage of the team’s defensive performance, especially following their victory in Super Bowl LX.

=== Defensive characteristics ===
During the 2025 season, the Seahawks defense utilized multiple-front alignments and emphasized pressure generated by the defensive line. The unit ranked among league leaders in several major defensive statistical categories, including points allowed per game and takeaways.

The Dark Side is frequently compared favorably to the 2010s Seahawks defense, the Legion of Boom. Defensive tackle Jarran Reed is the only player from the Dark Side to have also played on the Legion of Boom, as he previously played with the Seahawks from 2016 to 2020 before returning to the team in 2023.

=== Key players ===
==== Defensive line ====
- Byron Murphy II – Defensive tackle
- Brandon Pili – Nose tackle
- Jarran Reed – Defensive tackle
- Leonard Williams – Defensive tackle

==== Edge rushers ====
- Derick Hall – Linebacker (edge)
- Boye Mafe – Linebacker (edge)
- Uchenna Nwosu – Linebacker (edge)
- DeMarcus Lawrence – Defensive end

==== Linebackers ====
- Ernest Jones IV – Linebacker
- Tyrice Knight – Linebacker
- Drake Thomas – Linebacker

==== Secondary ====
- Josh Jobe – Cornerback
- Devon Witherspoon – Cornerback
- Riq Woolen – Cornerback
- Coby Bryant – Safety
- Nick Emmanwori – Nickel
- Julian Love – Safety
- Ty Okada – Safety

== Offseason ==
=== Free agents ===
| Position | Player | Tag | 2025 team | Date signed | Contract |
|---|---|---|---|---|---|
| TE | Pharaoh Brown | UFA | Miami Dolphins | March 17, 2025 | 1 year, TBD |
| CB | Tre Brown | UFA | San Francisco 49ers | March 12, 2025 | TBD |
| CB | Artie Burns | UFA | Miami Dolphins | March 17, 2025 | 1 year, TBD |
| WR | Jaelon Darden | UFA | | | |
| OT | George Fant | UFA | Washington Commanders | August 19, 2025 | TBD |
| OT | Stone Forsythe | UFA | New York Giants | March 12, 2025 | 1 year, $1.3 million |
| LB | Trevis Gipson | UFA | San Francisco 49ers | August 11, 2025 | TBD |
| DT | Johnathan Hankins | UFA | Seattle Seahawks | May 7, 2025 | TBD |
| S | Rayshawn Jenkins | UFA | Cleveland Browns | May 12, 2025 | TBD |
| CB | Josh Jobe | UFA | Seattle Seahawks | March 6, 2025 | TBD |
| DE | Dre'Mont Jones | UFA | Tennessee Titans | March 12, 2025 | 1 year, $8.5 million |
| LB | Ernest Jones IV | UFA | Seattle Seahawks | March 9, 2025 | 3 years, $33 million |
| LB | Joshua Onujiogu | UFA | | | |
| DT | Jarran Reed | UFA | Seattle Seahawks | March 10, 2025 | 3 years, $25 million |
| DT | Roy Robertson-Harris | UFA | New York Giants | March 10, 2025 | 2 years, $9 million |
| LB | Josh Ross | UFA | Seattle Seahawks | March 21, 2025 | TBD |
| OG | Laken Tomlinson | UFA | Houston Texans | March 18, 2025 | 1 year, $4.25 million |
| S | K'Von Wallace | UFA | Houston Texans | November 13, 2025 | TBD |
| WR | Cody White | UFA | Seattle Seahawks | March 14, 2025 | TBD |

=== Signings ===
| Position | Player | Previous team | Date signed | Contract |
|---|---|---|---|---|
| S | D'Anthony Bell | Cleveland Browns | March 24, 2025 | TBD |
| WR | River Cracraft | Miami Dolphins | March 21, 2025 | TBD |
| QB | Sam Darnold | Minnesota Vikings | March 10, 2025 | 3 years, $100.5 million |
| CB | Shemar Jean-Charles | New Orleans Saints | March 19, 2025 | TBD |
| OT | Josh Jones | Baltimore Ravens | March 13, 2025 | 1 year, $4.75 million |
| WR | Cooper Kupp | Los Angeles Rams | March 14, 2025 | 3 years, $45 million |
| DE | DeMarcus Lawrence | Dallas Cowboys | March 13, 2025 | 3 years, $32.5 million |
| TE | Eric Saubert | San Francisco 49ers | March 24, 2025 | TBD |
| WR | Steven Sims | Baltimore Ravens | March 25, 2025 | TBD |
| WR | Marquez Valdes-Scantling | New Orleans Saints | March 13, 2025 | 1 year, $4 million |

=== Players lost ===
| Position | Player | Reason | 2025 team | Date |
|---|---|---|---|---|
| DE | Dre'Mont Jones | Released | Tennessee Titans | March 4, 2025 |
| WR | Tyler Lockett | Released | Tennessee Titans | March 5, 2025 |
| WR | DK Metcalf | Traded | Pittsburgh Steelers | March 13, 2025 |
| QB | Geno Smith | Traded | Las Vegas Raiders | March 13, 2025 |
| TE | Noah Fant | Released | Cincinnati Bengals | July 20, 2025 |

=== Draft ===
2025 Seattle Seahawks draft selections
| Round | Selection | Player | Position | College | Notes |
|---|---|---|---|---|---|
| 1 | 18 | Grey Zabel | G | North Dakota State | |
| 2 | 35 | Nick Emmanwori | S | South Carolina | From Titans |
| 2 | 50 | Elijah Arroyo | TE | Miami (FL) | From Steelers (Note: The Seahawks traded a sixth-round selection (185th overall) and WR DK Metcalf to the Pittsburgh Steelers in exchange for second- and seventh-round selections (52nd and 223rd overall).) |
| 2 | 52 | Traded to the Tennessee Titans | | | |
| 3 | 82 | Traded to the Tennessee Titans | | | |
| 3 | 92 | Jalen Milroe | QB | Alabama | From Lions via Jets and Raiders (Note: The Seahawks traded QB Geno Smith to the Las Vegas Raiders in exchange for a third-round selection (92nd overall).) |
| 4 | 120 | Traded to the Tennessee Titans (Note: The Seahawks traded a fourth-round selection (120th overall) and LB Jerome Baker to the Tennessee Titans in exchange for LB Ernest Jones.) | | | |
| 4 | 137 | Traded to the New England Patriots | | | Compensatory selection |
| 5 | 142 | Rylie Mills | DT | Notre Dame | From Vikings |
| 5 | 144 | Traded to the Cleveland Browns | | | From Patriots |
| 5 | 154 | Traded to the New York Giants (Note: The Seahawks traded a fifth-round selection (154th overall) and a 2024 second-round selection to the New York Giants in exchange for DL Leonard Williams.) | | | |
| 5 | 166 | Tory Horton | WR | Colorado State | From Browns |
| 5 | 172 | Traded to the Minnesota Vikings | | | Compensatory selection |
| 5 | 175 | Robbie Ouzts | FB | Alabama | Compensatory selection |
| 6 | 185 | Traded to the Pittsburgh Steelers | | | From Bears (Note: The Seahawks traded LB Darrell Taylor to the Chicago Bears in exchange for a sixth-round selection (185th overall).) |
| 6 | 192 | Bryce Cabeldue | OT | Kansas | From Browns |
| 6 | 194 | Traded to the Jacksonville Jaguars (Note: The Seahawks traded a sixth-round selection (194th overall) to the Jacksonville Jaguars in exchange for LB Trevis Gipson.) | | | |
| 7 | 223 | Damien Martinez | RB | Miami | From Steelers |
| 7 | 234 | Mason Richman | OT | Iowa | |
| 7 | 238 | Ricky White | WR | UNLV | From Patriots |

2025 Seattle Seahawks undrafted free agents
| Name | Position | College | Ref. |
|---|---|---|---|
| Zy Alexander | CB | LSU | |
| Tyrone Broden | WR | Arkansas | |
| Seth Coleman | LB | Illinois | |
| Jalan Gaines | LB | Illinois State | |
| Jared Ivey | LB | Ole Miss | |
| T.J. Jackson | DE | West Virginia | |
| Nick Kallerup | TE | Minnesota | |
| Amari Kight | T | UCF | |
| Marshall Lang | TE | Northwestern | |
| Federico Maranges | C | Florida Atlantic* | |
| Connor O'Toole | LB | Utah | |
| Demeco Roland | NT | Southern Miss | |
| J. R. Singleton | NT | Iowa State | |
| Bubba Thomas | NT | South Alabama | |
| Isas Waxter | CB | Villanova | |
| Jackson Woodard | LB | UNLV | |
| Jacardia Wright | RB | Missouri State | |

* Signed from Puerto Rico as part of the International Player Pathway Program

== Staff ==
2025 Seattle Seahawks staff
| Front office: Owning entity – Paul Allen estate; Chairwoman/trustee – Jody Allen; Vice chairman – Bert Kolde; President – Chuck Arnold; President of football operations/general manager – John Schneider; Assistant general manager – Nolan Teasley; Vice president of football administration – Joey Laine; Vice president of player personnel – Trent Kirchner; VP of player acquisition – Matt Berry; Director of college scouting – Aaron Hineline; Director of pro personnel – Willie Schneider; Assistant director of college scouting – Jason Barnes; Assistant director of pro personnel – Armani Perez; Head coaches: Head coach – Mike Macdonald; Assistant head coach – Leslie Frazier; Offensive coaches: Offensive coordinator – Klint Kubiak; Passing game coordinator – Jake Peetz; Quarterbacks – Andrew Janocko; Running backs – Kennedy Polamalu; Wide receivers – Frisman Jackson; Tight ends – Mack Brown; Offensive line – John Benton; Run game specialist/assistant offensive line coach – Justin Outten; Run game coordinator/senior offensive advisor – Rick Dennison; Offensive assistant/quality control-offensive line – Quinshon Odom; Offensive assistant/quarterbacks – Tyson Prince; Offensive assistant – Michael Byrne; Special projects – Keller Chryst | Defensive coaches: Defensive coordinator – Aden Durde; Defensive line – Justin Hinds; Outside linebackers – Chris Partridge; Inside linebackers – Kirk Olivadotti; Passing game coordinator/defensive backs – Karl Scott; Safeties – Jeff Howard; Defensive assistant/linebackers – Josh Bynes; Defensive assistant/defensive backs – Neiko Thorpe; Defensive intern – Rob Caprice; Special teams coaches: Special teams coordinator – Jay Harbaugh; Assistant special teams – Devin Fitzsimmons; Strength and conditioning: Director of Player Performance and Development – Ivan Lewis; Head Strength Coach – Danny Van Dijk; Associate Head Strength Coach – Mark Philipp; Strength & Conditioning Assistant – Thomas Garcia; Strength & Conditioning Assistant – Tim Ojeda; Strength & Conditioning Assistant – Jamie Yanchar |

== Final roster ==
2025 Seattle Seahawks roster
| Quarterbacks (QB): 14 Sam Darnold; 2 Drew Lock; 6 Jalen Milroe; Running backs (RB): 36 George Holani; 40 Robbie Ouzts FB; 38 Brady Russell FB; 9 Kenneth Walker III; Wide receivers (WR): 19 Jake Bobo; 10 Cooper Kupp; 22 Rashid Shaheed; 11 Jaxon Smith-Njigba; 83 Dareke Young; Tight ends (TE): 18 Elijah Arroyo; 88 AJ Barner; 89 Nick Kallerup; 81 Eric Saubert | Offensive linemen (OL): 75 Anthony Bradford RG; 67 Charles Cross LT; 64 Christian Haynes G; 74 Josh Jones RT; 72 Abraham Lucas RT; 55 Olu Oluwatimi C; 78 Mason Richman LT; 61 Jalen Sundell C; 76 Grey Zabel LG; Defensive linemen (DL): 98 Rylie Mills DE; 94 Mike Morris DE; 91 Byron Murphy II NT; 95 Brandon Pili NT; 90 Jarran Reed DT; 99 Leonard Williams DE | Linebackers (LB): 58 Derick Hall OLB; 51 Jared Ivey OLB; 13 Ernest Jones MLB; 48 Tyrice Knight MLB; 0 DeMarcus Lawrence OLB; 53 Boye Mafe OLB; 7 Uchenna Nwosu OLB; 52 Patrick O'Connell ILB; 57 Connor O'Toole OLB; 44 Chazz Surratt MLB; 42 Drake Thomas OLB; Defensive backs (DB): 8 Coby Bryant FS; 3 Nick Emmanwori SS; 29 Josh Jobe CB; 20 Julian Love SS; 39 Ty Okada S; 28 Nehemiah Pritchett CB; 21 Devon Witherspoon CB; 27 Riq Woolen CB; Special teams (ST): 4 Michael Dickson P; 5 Jason Myers K; 41 Chris Stoll LS | Practice squad: 30 Cam Akers RB; 85 Tyrone Broden WR (PS/I); 73 Logan Brown RT; 37 Quandre Diggs FS; 87 Montorie Foster WR; 24 Shaquill Griffin CB; 35 Tyler Hall CB; 43 Maxen Hook S; 84 Courtney Jackson WR; 34 Shemar Jean-Charles CB; 32 Velus Jones Jr. RB; 66 Shane Lemieux G (PS/I); 62 Federico Maranges C (IPP); 49 Chris Paul Jr. ILB; 50 Jamie Sheriff OLB; 70 J. R. Singleton NT; 69 Bubba Thomas DT; 46 Ja'Markis Weston ILB; 86 Ricky White WR; 31 Jacardia Wright RB (PS/I); Reserve: 77 Bryce Cabeldue G (IR); 26 Zach Charbonnet RB (IR); 30 A. J. Finley SS (IR); 15 Tory Horton WR (IR); 79 Amari Kight RT (IR); 25 Kenny McIntosh RB (IR); 82 Cody White WR (IR); Rookies in italics 53 active, 7 reserve, 17 practice squad (3 exempt) |

== Preseason ==
| Week | Date | Opponent | Result | Record | Venue | Recap |
|---|---|---|---|---|---|---|
| 1 | August 7 | Las Vegas Raiders | T 23–23 | 0–0–1 | Lumen Field | Recap |
| 2 | August 15 | Kansas City Chiefs | W 33–16 | 1–0–1 | Lumen Field | Recap |
| 3 | August 23 | at Green Bay Packers | L 7–20 | 1–1–1 | Lambeau Field | Recap |

== Regular season ==
=== Schedule ===
| Week | Date | Opponent | Result | Record | Venue | Recap |
|---|---|---|---|---|---|---|
| 1 | September 7 | **San Francisco 49ers** | **L** 13–17 | 0–1 | Lumen Field | Recap |
| 2 | September 14 | at Pittsburgh Steelers | **W** 31–17 | 1–1 | Acrisure Stadium | Recap |
| 3 | September 21 | New Orleans Saints | **W** 44–13 | 2–1 | Lumen Field | Recap |
| 4 | September 25 | at **Arizona Cardinals** | **W** 23–20 | 3–1 | State Farm Stadium | Recap |
| 5 | October 5 | Tampa Bay Buccaneers | **L** 35–38 | 3–2 | Lumen Field | Recap |
| 6 | October 12 | at Jacksonville Jaguars | **W** 20–12 | 4–2 | EverBank Stadium | Recap |
| 7 | October 20 | Houston Texans | **W** 27–19 | 5–2 | Lumen Field | Recap |
| 8 | Bye | | | | | |
| 9 | November 2 | at Washington Commanders | **W** 38–14 | 6–2 | Northwest Stadium | Recap |
| 10 | November 9 | **Arizona Cardinals** | **W** 44–22 | 7–2 | Lumen Field | Recap |
| 11 | November 16 | at **Los Angeles Rams** | **L** 19–21 | 7–3 | SoFi Stadium | Recap |
| 12 | November 23 | at Tennessee Titans | **W** 30–24 | 8–3 | Nissan Stadium | Recap |
| 13 | November 30 | Minnesota Vikings | **W** 26–0 | 9–3 | Lumen Field | Recap |
| 14 | December 7 | at Atlanta Falcons | **W** 37–9 | 10–3 | Mercedes-Benz Stadium | Recap |
| 15 | December 14 | Indianapolis Colts | **W** 18–16 | 11–3 | Lumen Field | Recap |
| 16 | December 18 | **Los Angeles Rams** | **W** 38–37 (OT) | 12–3 | Lumen Field | Recap |
| 17 | December 28 | at Carolina Panthers | **W** 27–10 | 13–3 | Bank of America Stadium | Recap |
| 18 | January 3 | at **San Francisco 49ers** | **W** 13–3 | 14–3 | Levi's Stadium | Recap |

Note: Intra-division opponents are in bold text.

=== Game summaries ===
==== Week 1: vs. San Francisco 49ers ====
Week 1: San Francisco 49ers at Seattle Seahawks – Game summary

| Quarter | 1 | 2 | 3 | 4 | Total |
|---|---|---|---|---|---|
| **49ers** | 7 | 0 | 0 | 10 | **17** |
| Seahawks | 0 | 10 | 0 | 3 | **13** |

at Lumen Field, Seattle, Washington

- Date: September 7
- Game time: 1:05 p.m. PDT
- Game weather: Cloudy, 67 °F (19 °C)
- Game attendance: 68,752
- Referee: Shawn Hochuli
- TV announcers (Fox): Joe Davis, Greg Olsen and Pam Oliver
- Recap, Game Book

Game information

**First quarter**

- SF – George Kittle 5-yard pass from Brock Purdy (Jake Moody kick), 3:43. 49ers 7–0. **Drive: 14 plays, 95 yards, 8:22.**

**Second quarter**

- SEA – Zach Charbonnet 1-yard run (Jason Myers kick), 13:38. Tied 7–7. **Drive: 10 plays, 69 yards, 5:05.**
- SEA – Jason Myers 48-yard field goal, 0:02. Seahawks 10–7. **Drive: 8 plays, 50 yards, 0:55.**

**Third quarter**

- No scoring plays.

**Fourth quarter.**

- SF – Jake Moody 32-yard field goal, 9:42. Tied 10–10. **Drive: 11 plays, 52 yards, 5:08.**
- SEA – Jason Myers 37-yard field goal, 3:24. Seahawks 13–10. **Drive: 8 plays, 34 yards, 3:42.**
- SF – Jake Tonges 4-yard pass from Brock Purdy (Jake Moody kick), 1:34. 49ers 17–13. **Drive: 7 plays, 68 yards, 1:50.**

**Top passers**

- SF – Brock Purdy – 26/35, 277 yards, 2 TD, 2 INT
- SEA – Sam Darnold – 16/23, 150 yards

**Top rushers**

- SF – Christian McCaffrey – 22 rushes, 69 yards
- SEA – Zach Charbonnet – 12 rushes, 47 yards, TD

**Top receivers**

- SF – Ricky Pearsall – 4 receptions, 108 yards
- SEA – Jaxon Smith-Njigba – 9 receptions, 124 yards

With the loss, the Seahawks started their season 0–1.

==== Week 2: at Pittsburgh Steelers ====
Week 2: Seattle Seahawks at Pittsburgh Steelers – Game summary

| Quarter | 1 | 2 | 3 | 4 | Total |
|---|---|---|---|---|---|
| **Seahawks** | 7 | 0 | 7 | 17 | **31** |
| Steelers | 6 | 8 | 0 | 3 | **17** |

at Acrisure Stadium, Pittsburgh, Pennsylvania

- Date: September 14
- Game time: 1:00 p.m. EDT/10:00 a.m. PDT
- Game weather: Sunny, 79 °F (26 °C)
- Game attendance: 66,347
- Referee: Scott Novak
- TV announcers (Fox): Adam Amin, Mark Sanchez and Kristina Pink
- Recap, Game Book

Game information

**First quarter**

- SEA – Tory Horton 21-yard pass from Sam Darnold (Jason Myers kick), 10:29. Seahawks 7–0. **Drive: 8 plays, 65 yards, 4:31.**
- PIT – Chris Boswell 48-yard field goal, 4:47. Seahawks 7–3. **Drive: 10 plays, 46 yards, 5:42.**
- PIT – Chris Boswell 48-yard field goal, 2:13. Seahawks 7–6. **Drive: 6 plays, 14 yards, 2:20.**

**Second quarter**

- PIT – DK Metcalf 2-yard pass from Aaron Rodgers (Aaron Rodgers–Darnell Washington pass), 1:09. Steelers 14–7. **Drive: 6 plays, 21 yards, 2:20.**

**Third quarter**

- SEA – AJ Barner 7-yard pass from Sam Darnold (Jason Myers kick), 6:10. Tied 14–14. **Drive: 9 plays, 80 yards, 5:01.**

**Fourth quarter**

- SEA – Jason Myers 54-yard field goal, 12:46. Seahawks 17–14. **Drive: 10 plays, 55 yards, 3:47.**
- SEA – Jason Myers 65-yard kickoff recovered by George Holani in the end zone for a touchdown (Jason Myers kick), 12:46. Seahawks 24–14.
- PIT – Chris Boswell 45-yard field goal, 7:49. Seahawks 24–17. **Drive: 9 plays, 45 yards, 4:57.**
- SEA – Kenneth Walker III 19-yard run (Jason Myers kick), 3:41. Seahawks 31–17. **Drive: 7 plays, 73 yards, 4:08.**

**Top passers**

- SEA – Sam Darnold – 22/33, 295 yards, 2 TD, 2 INT
- PIT – Aaron Rodgers – 18/33, 203 yards, TD, 2 INT

**Top rushers**

- SEA – Kenneth Walker III – 13 rushes, 105 yards, TD
- PIT – Jaylen Warren – 14 rushes, 48 yards

**Top receivers**

- SEA – Jaxon Smith-Njigba – 8 receptions, 103 yards
- PIT – Jaylen Warren – 4 receptions, 86 yards

At the beginning of the fourth quarter, the game-deciding play occurred following a Seahawks field goal. On the ensuing kickoff, Steelers returner Kaleb Johnson failed to go after the ball, mistakenly thinking it was not live. However, because the ball landed in the kickoff landing zone, it was live, and Seahawks player George Holani recovered it in the end zone for a touchdown.

==== Week 3: vs. New Orleans Saints ====
Week 3: New Orleans Saints at Seattle Seahawks – Game summary

| Quarter | 1 | 2 | 3 | 4 | Total |
|---|---|---|---|---|---|
| Saints | 0 | 6 | 0 | 7 | **13** |
| **Seahawks** | 21 | 17 | 6 | 0 | **44** |

at Lumen Field, Seattle, Washington

- Date: September 21
- Game time: 1:05 p.m. PDT
- Game weather: Cloudy, 63 °F (17 °C)
- Game attendance: 68,599
- Referee: Alex Moore
- TV announcers (CBS): Andrew Catalon, Charles Davis, Jason McCourty and AJ Ross
- Recap, Game Book

Game information

**First quarter**

- SEA – Jaxon Smith-Njigba 12-yard pass from Sam Darnold (Jason Myers kick), 9:48. Seahawks 7–0. **Drive: 6 plays, 55 yards, 2:32.**
- SEA – Tory Horton 95-yard punt return (Jason Myers kick), 7:31. Seahawks 14–0.
- SEA – Kenneth Walker III 3-yard run (Jason Myers kick), 4:22. Seahawks 21–0. **Drive: 2 plays, 11 yards, 0:28.**

**Second quarter**

- NO – Blake Grupe 27-yard field goal, 12:47. Seahawks 21–3. **Drive: 16 plays, 65 yards, 6:35.**
- SEA – Tory Horton 14-yard pass from Sam Darnold (Jason Myers kick), 11:18. Seahawks 28–3. **Drive: 3 plays, 38 yards, 1:29.**
- SEA – Kenneth Walker III 1-yard run (Jason Myers kick), 7:42. Seahawks 35–3. **Drive: 4 plays, 76 yards, 1:52.**
- SEA – Jason Myers 56-yard field goal, 1:29. Seahawks 38–3. **Drive: 6 plays, 20 yards, 1:20.**
- NO – Blake Grupe 23-yard field goal, 0:00. Seahawks 38–6. **Drive: 7 plays, 69 yards, 1:29.**

**Third quarter**

- SEA – Jason Myers 46-yard field goal, 11:29. Seahawks 41–6. **Drive: 7 plays, 37 yards, 3:31.**
- SEA – Jason Myers 37-yard field goal, 4:39. Seahawks 44–6. **Drive: 11 plays, 46 yards, 5:12.**

**Fourth quarter**

- NO – Jack Stoll 13-yard pass from Spencer Rattler (Blake Grupe kick), 14:53. Seahawks 44–13. **Drive: 11 plays, 80 yards, 4:46.**

**Top passers**

- NO – Spencer Rattler – 28/39, 218 yards, TD, INT
- SEA – Sam Darnold – 14/18, 218 yards, 2 TD

**Top rushers**

- NO – Alvin Kamara – 18 rushes, 42 yards
- SEA – Kenneth Walker III – 16 rushes, 38 yards, 2 TD

**Top receivers**

- NO – Chris Olave – 10 receptions, 57 yards
- SEA – Jaxon Smith-Njigba – 5 receptions, 96 yards, TD

Wide receiver Tory Horton ran a 95-yard punt return for a touchdown, setting a franchise record for the longest punt return. With the blowout win, the Seahawks improved to 2–1.

==== Week 4: at Arizona Cardinals ====
Week 4: Seattle Seahawks at Arizona Cardinals – Game summary

| Quarter | 1 | 2 | 3 | 4 | Total |
|---|---|---|---|---|---|
| **Seahawks** | 7 | 7 | 3 | 6 | **23** |
| Cardinals | 3 | 0 | 3 | 14 | **20** |

at State Farm Stadium, Glendale, Arizona

- Date: September 25
- Game time: 5:15 p.m. MST & PDT
- Game weather: None (retractable roof closed)
- Game attendance: 65,016
- Referee: Alex Kemp
- TV announcers (Prime Video): Al Michaels, Kirk Herbstreit and Kaylee Hartung
- Recap, Game Book

Game information

**First quarter**

- ARI – Chad Ryland 33-yard field goal, 4:37. Cardinals 3–0. **Drive: 6 plays, 33 yards, 4:09.**
- SEA – AJ Barner 16-yard pass from Sam Darnold (Jason Myers kick), 1:33. Seahawks 7–3. **Drive: 7 plays, 77 yards, 3:04.**

**Second quarter**

- SEA – Zach Charbonnet 1-yard run (Jason Myers kick), 1:01. Seahawks 14–3. **Drive: 7 plays, 90 yards, 2:44.**

**Third quarter**

- SEA – Jason Myers 44-yard field goal, 8:56. Seahawks 17–3. **Drive: 10 plays, 40 yards, 6:04.**
- ARI – Chad Ryland 57-yard field goal, 1:39. Seahawks 17–6. **Drive: 7 plays, 23 yards, 3:11.**

**Fourth quarter**

- SEA – Jason Myers 31-yard field goal, 9:33. Seahawks 20–6. **Drive: 14 plays, 53 yards, 7:06.**
- ARI – Marvin Harrison Jr. 16-yard pass from Kyler Murray (Chad Ryland kick), 5:50. Seahawks 20–13. **Drive: 8 plays, 73 yards, 3:43.**
- ARI – Emari Demercado 7-yard pass from Kyler Murray (Chad Ryland kick), 0:28. Tied 20–20. **Drive: 12 plays, 57 yards, 2:48.**
- SEA – Jason Myers 52-yard field goal, 0:00. Seahawks 23–20. **Drive: 4 plays, 26 yards, 0:28.**

**Top passers**

- SEA – Sam Darnold – 18/26, 242 yards, TD
- ARI – Kyler Murray – 27/42, 200 yards, 2 TD, 2 INT

**Top receivers**

- SEA – Kenneth Walker III – 19 rushes, 81 yards
- ARI – Kyler Murray – 5 rushes, 41 yards

**Top receivers**

- SEA – Jaxon Smith-Njigba – 4 receptions, 79 yards
- ARI – Marvin Harrison Jr. – 6 receptions, 66 yards, TD

With their eighth consecutive win over Arizona, the Seahawks improved to 3–1.

==== Week 5: vs. Tampa Bay Buccaneers ====
Week 5: Tampa Bay Buccaneers at Seattle Seahawks – Game summary

| Quarter | 1 | 2 | 3 | 4 | Total |
|---|---|---|---|---|---|
| **Buccaneers** | 3 | 10 | 15 | 10 | **38** |
| Seahawks | 0 | 7 | 14 | 14 | **35** |

at Lumen Field, Seattle, Washington

- Date: October 5
- Game time: 1:05 p.m. PDT
- Game weather: Sunny, 61 °F (16 °C)
- Game attendance: 68,804
- Referee: Craig Wrolstad
- TV announcers (CBS): Kevin Harlan, Trent Green and Melanie Collins
- Recap, Game Book

Game information

**First quarter**

- TB – Chase McLaughlin 30-yard field goal, 7:57. Buccaneers 3–0. **Drive: 11 plays, 68 yards, 7:03.**

**Second quarter**

- TB – Chase McLaughlin 36-yard field goal, 14:08. Buccaneers 6–0. **Drive: 10 plays, 48 yards, 4:57.**
- TB – Rachaad White 7-yard run (Chase McLaughlin kick), 2:09. Buccaneers 13–0. **Drive: 7 plays, 59 yards, 4:15.**
- SEA – Jaxon Smith-Njigba 6-yard pass from Sam Darnold (Jason Myers kick), 0:06. Buccaneers 13–7. **Drive: 10 plays, 54 yards, 2:03.**

**Third quarter**

- SEA – Zach Charbonnet 5-yard run (Jason Myers kick), 13:01. Seahawks 14–13. **Drive: 10 plays, 54 yards, 2:03.**
- TB – Emeka Egbuka 20-yard pass from Baker Mayfield (Baker Mayfield–Emeka Egbuka pass), 7:52. Buccaneers 21–14. **Drive: 9 plays, 77 yards, 5:09.**
- SEA – AJ Barner 2-yard pass from Sam Darnold (Jason Myers kick), 4:12. Tied 21–21. **Drive: 6 plays, 80 yards, 3:40.**
- TB – Rachaad White 1-yard run (Chase McLaughlin kick), 0:19. Buccaneers 28–21. **Drive: 6 plays, 75 yards, 3:53.**

**Fourth quarter**

- SEA – AJ Barner 6-yard pass from Sam Darnold (Jason Myers kick), 9:48. Tied 28–28. **Drive: 10 plays, 51 yards, 5:31.**
- SEA – Tory Horton 21-yard pass from Sam Darnold (Jason Myers kick), 3:18. Seahawks 35–28. **Drive: 8 plays, 99 yards, 4:02.**
- TB – Sterling Shepard 11-yard pass from Baker Mayfield (Chase McLaughlin kick), 1:08. Tied 35–35. **Drive: 5 plays, 70 yards, 2:10.**
- TB – Chase McLaughlin 39-yard field goal, 0:00. Buccaneers 38–35. **Drive: 5 plays, 14 yards, 0:53.**

**Top passers**

- TB – Baker Mayfield – 29/33, 379 yards, 2 TD
- SEA – Sam Darnold – 28/34, 341 yards, 4 TD, INT

**Top rushers**

- TB – Rachaad White – 14 rushes, 41 yards, 2 TD
- SEA – Kenneth Walker III – 10 rushes, 86 yards

**Top receivers**

- TB – Emeka Egbuka – 7 receptions, 163 yards, TD
- SEA – Jaxon Smith-Njigba – 8 receptions, 132 yards, TD

With both clubs celebrating their respective 50th seasons, both teams wore throwback uniforms. In a shootout, Sam Darnold threw an interception to Lavonte David, allowing the Buccaneers to set up the winning field goal by Chase McLaughlin as time expired. With the loss, the Seahawks fell to 3–2.

==== Week 6: at Jacksonville Jaguars ====
Week 6: Seattle Seahawks at Jacksonville Jaguars – Game summary

| Quarter | 1 | 2 | 3 | 4 | Total |
|---|---|---|---|---|---|
| **Seahawks** | 0 | 13 | 7 | 0 | **20** |
| Jaguars | 6 | 0 | 0 | 6 | **12** |

at EverBank Stadium, Jacksonville, Florida

- Date: October 12
- Game time: 1:00 p.m. EDT/10:00 a.m. PDT
- Game weather: Sunny, 76 °F (24 °C)
- Game attendance: 61,056
- Referee: Clay Martin
- TV announcers (Fox): Chris Myers, Mark Schlereth and Sarah Kustok
- Recap, Game Book

Game information

**First quarter**

- JAX – Brian Thomas Jr. 21-yard pass from Trevor Lawrence (kick failed, wide left), 1:14. Jaguars 6–0. **Drive: 8 plays, 61 yards, 4:24.**

**Second quarter**

- SEA – Jason Myers 24-yard field goal, 10:38. Jaguars 6–3. **Drive: 10 plays, 66 yards, 5:36.**
- SEA – Jaxon Smith-Njigba 61-yard pass from Sam Darnold (Jason Myers kick), 8:34. Seahawks 10–6. **Drive: 1 play, 61 yards, 0:08.**
- SEA – Jason Myers 53-yard field goal, 0:10. Seahawks 13–6. **Drive: 6 plays, 25 yards, 0:48.**

**Third quarter**

- SEA – Cooper Kupp 11-yard pass from Sam Darnold (Jason Myers kick), 10:14. Seahawks 20–6. **Drive: 8 plays, 77 yards, 4:46.**

**Fourth quarter**

- JAX – Tim Patrick 26-yard pass from Trevor Lawrence (run failed), 13:00. Seahawks 20–12. **Drive: 14 plays, 82 yards, 7:03.**

**Top passers**

- SEA – Sam Darnold – 16/27, 295 yards, 2 TD
- JAX – Trevor Lawrence – 27/42, 258 yards, 2 TD

**Top rushers**

- SEA – Kenneth Walker III – 10 rushes, 34 yards
- JAX – Travis Etienne – 12 rushes, 27 yards

**Top receivers**

- SEA – Jaxon Smith-Njigba – 8 receptions, 162 yards, TD
- JAX – Brian Thomas Jr. – 8 receptions, 90 yards, TD

==== Week 7: vs. Houston Texans ====
Week 7: Houston Texans at Seattle Seahawks – Game summary

| Quarter | 1 | 2 | 3 | 4 | Total |
|---|---|---|---|---|---|
| Texans | 0 | 6 | 6 | 7 | **19** |
| **Seahawks** | 14 | 0 | 13 | 0 | **27** |

at Lumen Field, Seattle, Washington

- Date: October 20
- Game time: 7:00 p.m. PDT
- Game weather: Cloudy, 56 °F (13 °C)
- Game attendance: 68,632
- Referee: Carl Cheffers
- TV announcers (ESPN): Chris Fowler, Dan Orlovsky, Louis Riddick, Katie George and Peter Schrager
- Recap, Game Book

Game information

**First quarter**

- SEA – Zach Charbonnet 1-yard run (Jason Myers kick), 7:28. Seahawks 7–0. **Drive: 5 plays, 44 yards, 2:38.**
- SEA – Jaxon Smith-Njigba 11-yard pass from Sam Darnold (Jason Myers kick), 0:00. Seahawks 14–0. **Drive: 10 plays, 80 yards, 5:08.**

**Second quarter**

- HOU – Ka'imi Fairbairn 36-yard field goal, 2:18. Seahawks 14–3. **Drive: 10 plays, 60 yards, 4:44.**
- HOU – Ka'imi Fairbairn 46-yard field goal, 0:00. Seahawks 14–6. **Drive: 3 plays, 29 yards, 0:13.**

**Third quarter**

- SEA – Jason Myers 26-yard field goal, 10:34. Seahawks 17–6. **Drive: 8 plays, 31 yards, 3:28.**
- HOU – Will Anderson Jr. 0-yard fumble recovery (pass failed), 7:24. Seahawks 17–12.
- SEA – Jason Myers 47-yard field goal, 5:15. Seahawks 20–12. **Drive: 5 plays, 33 yards, 2:09.**
- SEA – Zach Charbonnet 2-yard run (Jason Myers kick), 0:54. Seahawks 27–12. **Drive: 5 plays, 39 yards, 2:17.**

**Fourth quarter**

- HOU – Woody Marks 4-yard pass from C. J. Stroud (Ka'imi Fairbairn kick), 2:04. Seahawks 27–19. **Drive: 8 plays, 50 yards, 2:30.**

**Top passers**

- HOU – C. J. Stroud – 23/49, 229 yards, TD, INT
- SEA – Sam Darnold – 17/31, 213 yards, TD, INT

**Top rushers**

- HOU – C. J. Stroud – 2 rushes, 25 yards
- SEA – Kenneth Walker III – 17 rushes, 66 yards

**Top receivers**

- HOU – Dalton Schultz – 9 receptions, 98 yards
- SEA – Jaxon Smith-Njigba – 8 receptions, 123 yards, TD

With the win, the Seahawks entered their bye week at 5–2 and 2–0 against the AFC South.

==== Week 9: at Washington Commanders ====
Week 9: Seattle Seahawks at Washington Commanders – Game summary

| Quarter | 1 | 2 | 3 | 4 | Total |
|---|---|---|---|---|---|
| **Seahawks** | 7 | 24 | 7 | 0 | **38** |
| Commanders | 0 | 7 | 0 | 7 | **14** |

at Northwest Stadium, Landover, Maryland

- Date: November 2
- Game time: 8:20 p.m. EST/5:20 p.m. PST
- Game weather: Mostly clear, 52 °F (11 °C)
- Game attendance: 64,197
- Referee: Bill Vinovich
- TV announcers (NBC): Mike Tirico, Cris Collinsworth and Melissa Stark
- Recap, Game Book

Game information

**First quarter**

- SEA – Tory Horton 4-yard pass from Sam Darnold (Jason Myers kick), 3:04. Seahawks 7–0. **Drive: 12 plays, 90 yards, 8:07.**

**Second quarter**

- SEA – Tory Horton 25-yard pass from Sam Darnold (Jason Myers kick), 8:52. Seahawks 14–0. **Drive: 7 plays, 60 yards, 3:57.**
- SEA – Elijah Arroyo 26-yard pass from Sam Darnold (Jason Myers kick), 8:41. Seahawks 21–0. **Drive: 1 play, 26 yards, 0:05.**
- SEA – Cody White 60-yard pass from Sam Darnold (Jason Myers kick), 4:34. Seahawks 28–0. **Drive: 4 plays, 87 yards, 2:10.**
- WAS – Jayden Daniels 1-yard run (Matt Gay kick), 0:53. Seahawks 28–7. **Drive: 10 plays, 69 yards, 3:41.**
- SEA – Jason Myers 41-yard field goal, 0:00. Seahawks 31–7. **Drive: 4 plays, 53 yards, 0:53.**

**Third quarter**

- SEA – AJ Barner 1-yard run (Jason Myers kick), 1:53. Seahawks 38–7. **Drive: 9 plays, 60 yards, 3:48.**

**Fourth quarter**

- WAS – Chris Rodriguez Jr. 4-yard run (Matt Gay kick), 7:14. Seahawks 38–14. **Drive: 11 plays, 65 yards, 5:16.**

**Top passers**

- SEA – Sam Darnold – 21/24, 330 yards, 4 TD, INT
- WAS – Jayden Daniels – 16/22, 153 yards, INT

**Top rushers**

- SEA – Kenneth Walker III – 11 rushes, 42 yards
- WAS – Chris Rodriguez Jr. – 12 rushes, 65 yards, TD

**Top receivers**

- SEA – Jaxon Smith-Njigba – 8 receptions, 129 yards
- WAS – Zach Ertz – 4 receptions, 46 yards

With another dominant win, the Seahawks improved to 6–2. Sam Darnold completed all 16 passing attempts in the first half, achieving a perfect passer rating for the half.

==== Week 10: vs. Arizona Cardinals ====
Week 10: Arizona Cardinals at Seattle Seahawks – Game summary

| Quarter | 1 | 2 | 3 | 4 | Total |
|---|---|---|---|---|---|
| Cardinals | 0 | 7 | 8 | 7 | **22** |
| **Seahawks** | 21 | 17 | 0 | 6 | **44** |

at Lumen Field, Seattle, Washington

- Date: November 9
- Game time: 1:05 p.m. PST
- Game weather: Cloudy, 59 °F (15 °C)
- Game attendance: 68,723
- Referee: Alan Eck
- TV announcers (CBS): Kevin Harlan, Trent Green and Melanie Collins
- Recap, Game Book

Game information

**First quarters**

- SEA – Jaxon Smith-Njigba 43-yard pass from Sam Darnold (Jason Myers kick), 10:55. Seahawks 7–0. **Drive: 7 plays, 65 yards, 4:05.**
- SEA – DeMarcus Lawrence 34-yard fumble recovery (Jason Myers kick), 9:22. Seahawks 14–0.
- SEA – George Holani 9-yard run (Jason Myers kick), 1:23. Seahawks 21–0. **Drive: 9 plays, 81 yards, 4:51.**

**Second quarter**

- SEA – DeMarcus Lawrence 22-yard fumble recovery (Jason Myers kick), 14:08. Seahawks 28–0.
- SEA – Zach Charbonnet 6-yard run (Jason Myers kick), 8:33. Seahawks 35–0. **Drive: 6 plays, 76 yards, 3:44.**
- ARI – Greg Dortch 4-yard run (Chad Ryland kick), 2:50. Seahawks 35–7. **Drive: 2 plays, 3 yards, 0:37.**
- SEA – Jason Myers 46-yard field goal, 1:37. Seahawks 38–7. **Drive: 6 plays, 35 yards, 1:13.**

**Third quarter**

- ARI – Trey McBride 15-yard pass from Jacoby Brissett (Jacoby Brissett–Marvin Harrison Jr. pass), 8:42. Seahawks 38–15. **Drive: 4 plays, 19 yards, 0:57.**

**Fourth quarter**

- SEA – Jason Myers 32-yard field goal, 11:54. Seahawks 41–15. **Drive: 13 plays, 79 yards, 7:38.**
- ARI – Marvin Harrison Jr. 9-yard pass from Jacoby Brissett (Chad Ryland kick), 9:50. Seahawks 41–22. **Drive: 8 plays, 84 yards, 2:04.**
- SEA – Jason Myers 34-yard field goal, 5:34. Seahawks 44–22. **Drive: 7 plays, 30 yards, 4:19.**

**Top passers**

- ARI – Jacoby Brissett – 22/44, 258 yards, 2 TD
- SEA – Sam Darnold – 10/12, 178 yards, TD, INT

**Top rushers**

- ARI – Emari Demercado – 4 rushes, 64 yards
- SEA – Zach Charbonnet – 14 rushes, 83 yards, TD

**Top receivers**

- ARI – Trey McBride – 9 receptions, 127 yards, TD
- SEA – Jaxon Smith-Njigba – 5 receptions, 93 yards, TD

With their ninth win over Arizona since 2021, the Seahawks swept the Cardinals and improved to 7–2.

Jaxon Smith-Njigba became the first NFL receiver to eclipse 1,000 receiving yards this season.

==== Week 11: at Los Angeles Rams ====
Week 11: Seattle Seahawks at Los Angeles Rams – Game summary

| Quarter | 1 | 2 | 3 | 4 | Total |
|---|---|---|---|---|---|
| Seahawks | 3 | 6 | 3 | 7 | **19** |
| **Rams** | 14 | 0 | 0 | 7 | **21** |

at SoFi Stadium, Inglewood, California

- Date: November 16
- Game time: 1:05 p.m. PST
- Game weather: Cloudy, 64 °F (18 °C) (fixed roof)
- Game attendance: 75,323
- Referee: John Hussey
- TV announcers (Fox): Joe Davis, Greg Olsen, and Pam Oliver
- Recap, Game Book

Game information

**First quarter**

- LAR – Kyren Williams 1-yard run (Harrison Mevis kick), 8:38. Rams 7–0. **Drive: 4 plays, 3 yards, 2:10.**
- SEA – Jason Myers 57-yard field goal, 6:31. Rams 7–3. **Drive: 6 plays, 26 yards, 2:07.**
- LAR – Davante Adams 1-yard pass from Matthew Stafford (Harrison Mevis kick), 1:05. Rams 14–3. **Drive: 10 plays, 74 yards, 5:27.**

**Second quarter**

- SEA – Jason Myers 30-yard field goal, 9:04. Rams 14–6. **Drive: 13 plays, 53 yards, 7:00.**
- SEA – Jason Myers 22-yard field goal, 0:00. Rams 14–9. **Drive: 15 plays, 89 yards, 7:47.**

**Third quarter**

- SEA – Jason Myers 29-yard field goal, 8:02. Rams 14–12. **Drive: 10 plays, 55 yards, 5:54.**

**Fourth quarter**

- LAR – Colby Parkinson 6-yard pass from Matthew Stafford (Harrison Mevis kick), 14:15. Rams 21–12. **Drive: 4 plays, 25 yards, 1:49.**
- SEA – Kenneth Walker III 1-yard run (Jason Myers kick), 2:23. Rams 21–19. **Drive: 11 plays, 84 yards, 3:37.**

**Top passers**

- SEA – Sam Darnold – 29/44, 279 yards, 4 INT
- LAR – Matthew Stafford – 15/28, 130 yards, 2 TD

**Top rushers**

- SEA – Kenneth Walker III – 16 rushes, 67 yards, TD
- LAR – Kyren Williams – 12 rushes, 91 yards, TD

**Top receivers**

- SEA – Jaxon Smith-Njigba – 9 receptions, 105 yards
- LAR – Puka Nacua – 7 receptions, 75 yards

Despite Sam Darnold throwing four interceptions, the Seahawks had a final opportunity to win the game with a field goal. However, Jason Myers’ 61-yard attempt fell short and wide right.

The loss ended the Seahawks’ 10-game road winning streak, marking their first road defeat since losing to the Lions in Detroit in the 2024 season. This would also be their final loss of the season; they would go on a 10-game winning streak that culminated in their Super Bowl LX victory.

==== Week 12: at Tennessee Titans ====
Week 12: Seattle Seahawks at Tennessee Titans – Game summary

| Quarter | 1 | 2 | 3 | 4 | Total |
|---|---|---|---|---|---|
| **Seahawks** | 3 | 13 | 14 | 0 | **30** |
| Titans | 3 | 0 | 14 | 7 | **24** |

at Nissan Stadium, Nashville, Tennessee

- Date: November 23
- Game time: 12:00 p.m. CST/10:00 a.m. PST
- Game weather: Sunny, 55 °F (13 °C)
- Game attendance: 60,487
- Referee: Ron Torbert
- TV announcers (Fox): Kevin Kugler, Daryl Johnston and Allison Williams
- Recap, Game Book

Game information

**First quarter**

- TEN – Joey Slye 22-yard field goal, 5:51. Titans 3–0. **Drive: 15 plays, 63 yards, 9:09.**
- SEA – Jason Myers 47-yard field goal, 2:14. Tied 3–3. **Drive: 8 plays, 45 yards, 3:37.**

**Second quarter**

- SEA – Jaxon Smith-Njigba 63-yard pass from Sam Darnold (Jason Myers kick), 11:02. Seahawks 10–3. **Drive: 3 plays, 67 yards, 1:42.**
- SEA – Jason Myers 30-yard field goal, 4:44. Seahawks 13–3. **Drive: 8 plays, 15 yards, 4:04.**
- SEA – Jason Myers 36-yard field goal, 0:00. Seahawks 16–3. **Drive: 9 plays, 43 yards, 1:48.**

**Third quarter**

- SEA – Jaxon Smith-Njigba 13-yard pass from Sam Darnold (Jason Myers kick), 13:19. Seahawks 23–3. **Drive: 3 plays, 76 yards, 1:41.**
- TEN – Chimere Dike 90-yard punt return (Joey Slye kick), 10:22. Seahawks 23–10.
- SEA – Zach Charbonnet 5-yard run (Jason Myers kick), 6:40. Seahawks 30–10. **Drive: 6 plays, 74 yards, 3:42.**
- TEN – Cam Ward 6-yard run (Joey Slye kick), 1:18. Seahawks 30–17. **Drive: 9 plays, 73 yards, 5:22.**

**Fourth quarter**

- TEN – Chimere Dike 1-yard pass from Cam Ward (Joey Slye kick), 0:43. Seahawks 30–24. **Drive: 15 plays, 62 yards, 4:25.**

**Top passers**

- SEA – Sam Darnold – 16/26, 244 yards, 2 TD
- TEN – Cam Ward – 28/42, 256 yards, TD

**Top rushers**

- SEA – Kenneth Walker III – 11 rushes, 71 yards
- TEN – Cam Ward – 6 rushes, 37 yards, TD

**Top receivers**

- SEA – Jaxon Smith-Njigba – 8 receptions, 167 yards, 2 TD
- TEN – Gunnar Helm – 6 receptions, 51 yards

Wide receiver Jaxon Smith-Njigba, the NFL’s leader in receiving yards, finished with a season-high 167 yards and set a new Seahawks single-season receiving record with 1,313 yards in just 11 games, surpassing DK Metcalf’s previous mark of 1,303 yards set in the 2020 season. Mike McDonald improved to 12–2 (.857) on the road.

==== Week 13: vs. Minnesota Vikings ====
Week 13: Minnesota Vikings at Seattle Seahawks – Game summary

| Quarter | 1 | 2 | 3 | 4 | Total |
|---|---|---|---|---|---|
| Vikings | 0 | 0 | 0 | 0 | **0** |
| **Seahawks** | 0 | 13 | 6 | 7 | **26** |

at Lumen Field, Seattle, Washington

- Date: November 30
- Game time: 1:05 p.m. PST
- Game weather: Sunny, 45 °F (7 °C)
- Game attendance: 68,790
- Referee: Clete Blakeman
- TV announcers (Fox): Joe Davis, Greg Olsen and Pam Oliver
- Recap, Game Book

Game information

**First quarter**

- No scoring plays

**Second quarter**

- SEA – Jason Myers 33-yard field goal, 7:10. Seahawks 3–0. **Drive: 15 plays, 53 yards, 9:16.**
- SEA – Ernest Jones IV 85-yard interception return (Jason Myers kick), 2:59. Seahawks 10–0. **Drive: 4 plays, 9 yards, 2:22.**
- SEA – Jason Myers 56-yard field goal, 0:08. Seahawks 13–0. **Drive: 7 plays, 17 yards, 0:50.**

**Third quarter**

- SEA – Jason Myers 54-yard field goal, 11:14. Seahawks 16–0. **Drive: 8 plays, 44 yards, 3:46.**
- SEA – Jason Myers 40-yard field goal, 3:16. Seahawks 19–0. **Drive: 9 plays, 42 yards, 5:25.**

**Fourth quarter**

- SEA – Zach Charbonnet 17-yard run (Jason Myers kick), 9:11. Seahawks 26–0. **Drive: 6 plays, 32 yards, 3:41.**

**Top passers**

- MIN – Max Brosmer – 19/30, 126 yards, 4 INT
- SEA – Sam Darnold – 14/26, 128 yards

**Top rushers**

- MIN – Jordan Mason – 6 rushes, 47 yards
- SEA – Kenneth Walker III – 13 rushes, 56 yards

**Top receivers**

- MIN – T. J. Hockenson – 6 receptions, 59 yards
- SEA – AJ Barner – 4 receptions, 35 yards

The Seahawks recorded their first shutout win since beating the Chicago Bears 26–0 in the 2015 season.

==== Week 14: at Atlanta Falcons ====
Week 14: Seattle Seahawks at Atlanta Falcons – Game summary

| Quarter | 1 | 2 | 3 | 4 | Total |
|---|---|---|---|---|---|
| **Seahawks** | 3 | 3 | 17 | 14 | **37** |
| Falcons | 3 | 3 | 0 | 3 | **9** |

at Mercedes-Benz Stadium, Atlanta, Georgia

- Date: December 7
- Game time: 1:00 p.m. EST/10:00 a.m. PST
- Game weather: None (retractable roof closed)
- Game attendance: 68,721
- Referee: Alex Kemp
- TV announcers (Fox): Kevin Kugler, Daryl Johnston and Allison Williams
- Recap, Game Book

Game information

**First quarter**

- ATL – Zane Gonzalez 35-yard field goal, 7:14. Falcons 3–0. **Drive: 5 plays, 22 yards, 2:04.**
- SEA – Jason Myers 22-yard field goal, 0:49. Tied 3–3. **Drive: 12 plays, 70 yards, 6:25.**

**Second quarter**

- ATL – Zane Gonzalez 43-yard field goal, 1:01. Falcons 6–3. **Drive: 11 plays, 63 yards, 4:48.**
- SEA – Jason Myers 48-yard field goal, 0:00. Tied 6–6. **Drive: 7 plays, 45 yards, 1:01.**

**Third quarter**

- SEA – Rashid Shaheed 100-yard kickoff return (Jason Myers kick), 14:48. Seahawks 13–6.
- SEA – Jaxon Smith-Njigba 28-yard pass from Sam Darnold (Jason Myers kick), 6:16. Seahawks 20–6. **Drive: 8 plays, 88 yards, 5:02.**
- SEA – Jason Myers 37-yard field goal, 2:39. Seahawks 23–6. **Drive: 6 plays, 28 yards, 2:15.**

**Fourth quarter**

- ATL – Zane Gonzalez 27-yard field goal, 14:57. Seahawks 23–9. **Drive: 8 plays, 59 yards, 2:42.**
- SEA – Cooper Kupp 11-yard pass from Sam Darnold (Jason Myers kick), 12:13. Seahawks 30–9. **Drive: 6 plays, 60 yards, 2:44.**
- SEA – Jaxon Smith-Njigba 4-yard pass from Sam Darnold (Jason Myers kick), 8:27. Seahawks 37–9. **Drive: 6 plays, 35 yards, 3:02.**

**Top passers**

- SEA – Sam Darnold – 20/30, 249 yards, 3 TD, INT
- ATL – Kirk Cousins – 15/30, 162 yards, 2 INT

**Top rushers**

- SEA – Zach Charbonnet – 7 rushes, 46 yards
- ATL – Bijan Robinson – 20 rushes, 86 yards

**Top receivers**

- SEA – Jaxon Smith-Njigba – 7 receptions, 92 yards, 2 TD
- ATL – Kyle Pitts – 6 receptions, 90 yards

After a slow first half, the second-half kickoff was returned 100 yards for a touchdown by returner Rashid Shaheed, initiating a Seahawks-dominated second half against the Falcons.

==== Week 15: vs. Indianapolis Colts ====
Week 15: Indianapolis Colts at Seattle Seahawks – Game summary

| Quarter | 1 | 2 | 3 | 4 | Total |
|---|---|---|---|---|---|
| Colts | 3 | 10 | 0 | 3 | **16** |
| **Seahawks** | 3 | 3 | 3 | 9 | **18** |

at Lumen Field, Seattle, Washington

- Date: December 14
- Game time: 1:25 p.m. PST
- Game weather: Cloudy, 51 °F (11 °C)
- Game attendance: 68,771
- Referee: Adrian Hill
- TV announcers (CBS): Andrew Catalon, Charles Davis, Jason McCourty and AJ Ross
- Recap, Game Book

Game information

**First quarter**

- IND – Blake Grupe 42-yard field goal, 3:40. Colts 3–0. **Drive: 11 plays, 41 yards, 5:17.**
- SEA – Jason Myers 47-yard field goal, 0:50. Tied 3–3. **Drive: 6 plays, 34 yards, 2:50.**

**Second quarter**

- IND – Blake Grupe 54-yard field goal, 8:26. Colts 6–3. **Drive: 6 plays, 17 yards, 4:26.**
- IND – Josh Downs 8-yard pass from Philip Rivers (Blake Grupe kick), 1:33. Colts 13–3. **Drive: 10 plays, 58 yards, 4:16.**
- SEA – Jason Myers 52-yard field goal, 0:00. Colts 13–6. **Drive: 9 plays, 44 yards, 1:33.**

**Third quarter**

- SEA – Jason Myers 46-yard field goal, 9:49. Colts 13–9. **Drive: 11 plays, 43 yards, 5:11.**

**Fourth quarter**

- SEA – Jason Myers 32-yard field goal, 13:24. Colts 13–12. **Drive: 8 plays, 66 yards, 4:10.**
- SEA – Jason Myers 30-yard field goal, 2:27. Seahawks 15–13. **Drive: 11 plays, 82 yards, 5:42.**
- IND – Blake Grupe 60-yard field goal, 0:47. Colts 16–15. **Drive: 7 plays, 26 yards, 1:40.**
- SEA – Jason Myers 56-yard field goal, 0:18. Seahawks 18–16. **Drive: 5 plays, 25 yards, 0:29.**

**Top passers**

- IND – Philip Rivers – 18/27, 120 yards, TD, INT
- SEA – Sam Darnold – 22/36, 271 yards

**Top rushers**

- IND – Jonathan Taylor – 25 rushes, 87 yards
- SEA – Zach Charbonnet – 8 rushes, 31 yards

**Top receivers**

- IND – Ameer Abdullah – 5 receptions, 32 yards
- SEA – Jaxon Smith-Njigba – 7 receptions, 113 yards

Although heavily favored, the Seahawks struggled against the Colts and quarterback Philip Rivers, who came out of retirement to make his first start since the 2020 season. Despite scoring no touchdowns, Seattle prevailed as kicker Jason Myers converted six field goals, including a 56-yard attempt with 29 seconds remaining, to outlast the Colts. With the win, the Seahawks improved to 11–3 and they swept the AFC South and were 5–0 against the AFC.

Jason Myers' six field-goal conversions set a new Seahawks franchise record.

==== Week 16: vs. Los Angeles Rams ====
Week 16: Los Angeles Rams at Seattle Seahawks – Game summary

| Quarter | 1 | 2 | 3 | 4 | OT | Total |
|---|---|---|---|---|---|---|
| Rams | 3 | 10 | 10 | 7 | 7 | **37** |
| **Seahawks** | 7 | 0 | 7 | 16 | 8 | **38** |

at Lumen Field, Seattle, Washington

- Date: December 18
- Game time: 5:15 p.m. PST
- Game weather: Rain, 51 °F (11 °C)
- Game attendance: 68,853
- Referee: Brad Allen
- TV announcers (KCPQ/Prime Video): Al Michaels, Kirk Herbstreit and Kaylee Hartung
- Recap, Game Book

Game information

**First quarter**

- SEA – Zach Charbonnet 4-yard run (Jason Myers kick), 7:09. Seahawks 7–0. **Drive: 5 plays, 61 yards, 2:41.**
- LAR – Harrison Mevis 23-yard field goal, 1:43. Seahawks 7–3. **Drive: 12 plays, 71 yards, 5:26.**

**Second quarter**

- LAR – Harrison Mevis 28-yard field goal, 12:45. Seahawks 7–6. **Drive: 8 plays, 78 yards, 3:13.**
- LAR – Terrance Ferguson 3-yard pass from Matthew Stafford (Harrison Mevis kick), 3:43. Rams 13–7. **Drive: 11 plays, 62 yards, 6:41.**

**Third quarter**

- SEA – Kenneth Walker III 55-yard run (Jason Myers kick), 12:57. Seahawks 14–13. **Drive: 4 plays, 65 yards, 2:03.**
- LAR – Harrison Mevis 41-yard field goal, 8:37. Rams 16–14. **Drive: 7 plays, 51 yards, 4:20.**
- LAR – Blake Corum 1-yard run (Harrison Mevis kick), 6:30. Rams 23–14. **Drive: 1 play, 1 yard, 0:04.**

**Fourth quarter**

- LAR – Puka Nacua 1-yard pass from Matthew Stafford (Harrison Mevis kick), 13:34. Rams 30–14. **Drive: 9 plays, 85 yards, 4:58.**
- SEA – Rashid Shaheed 58-yard punt return (Sam Darnold–Cooper Kupp pass), 8:03. Rams 30–22.
- SEA – AJ Barner 26-yard pass from Sam Darnold (Zach Charbonnet run), 6:23. Tied 30–30. **Drive: 2 plays, 57 yards, 0:39.**

**Overtime**

- LAR – Puka Nacua 41-yard pass from Matthew Stafford (Harrison Mevis kick), 6:27. Rams 37–30. **Drive: 8 plays, 80 yards, 3:33.**
- SEA – Jaxon Smith-Njigba 4-yard pass from Sam Darnold (Sam Darnold–Eric Saubert pass), 3:13. Seahawks 38–37. **Drive: 9 plays, 65 yards, 3:14.**

**Top passers**

- LAR – Matthew Stafford – 29/49, 457 yards, 3 TD
- SEA – Sam Darnold – 22/34, 270 yards, 2 TD, 2 INT

**Top rushers**

- LAR – Kyren Williams – 23 rushes, 70 yards
- SEA – Kenneth Walker III – 11 rushes, 100 yards, TD

**Top receivers**

- LAR – Puka Nacua – 12 receptions, 225 yards, 2 TD
- SEA – Jaxon Smith-Njigba – 8 receptions, 96 yards, TD

The Rams led 30–14 in the fourth quarter with eight minutes remaining. However, a 58-yard punt return by Rashid Shaheed resulted in a Seahawks touchdown, followed by a two-point conversion. After another Rams punt, a 31-yard run by Shaheed set up a 26-yard touchdown pass to AJ Barner, bringing the Seahawks within two points. Seattle then attempted another two-point conversion. Although the pass was initially ruled incomplete, a replay review determined that quarterback Sam Darnold had attempted a backward pass. Zach Charbonnet, likely believing the play was dead, casually recovered the loose ball in the end zone and was credited with the conversion, tying the game. The play would soon gain the nickname of "The Zachwards Pass". With the Rams missing a 48-yard field goal attempt, the game proceeded to overtime, where the Rams scored a touchdown on the opening possession. The Seahawks responded with a touchdown of their own and again opted for a two-point conversion. Darnold completed a pass to Eric Saubert, giving Seattle an improbable victory. With the win, the Seahawks clinched their first playoff berth since 2022, and effectively put the team in control of the NFC West and the NFC's top seed.

The Seahawks became the first team to win in overtime after their opponent scored a touchdown first, following a change in the overtime rules that guarantees each team a possession unless the defense scores a safety on the opening possession. They also became the first team in NFL history to win an overtime game with a two-point conversion. This was the fifth time a team had scored three two-point conversions in a game, and the first time a team had won doing so. The Seahawks won their first game in franchise history when down 15 or more points in the fourth quarter, breaking a streak of 172 losses.

The game was praised for its competitiveness and spectacle, and is regarded as one of the best Thursday Night Football games of all time.

==== Week 17: at Carolina Panthers ====
Week 17: Seattle Seahawks at Carolina Panthers – Game summary

| Quarter | 1 | 2 | 3 | 4 | Total |
|---|---|---|---|---|---|
| **Seahawks** | 3 | 0 | 14 | 10 | **27** |
| Panthers | 0 | 3 | 0 | 7 | **10** |

at Bank of America Stadium, Charlotte, North Carolina

- Date: December 28
- Game time: 1:00 p.m. EST/10:00 a.m. PST
- Game weather: Cloudy, 43 °F (6 °C)
- Game attendance: 73,163
- Referee: Carl Cheffers
- TV announcers (CBS): Ian Eagle, J. J. Watt and Evan Washburn
- Recap, Game Book

Game information

**First quarter**

- SEA – Jason Myers 48-yard field goal, 3:23. Seahawks 3–0. **Drive: 9 plays, 40 yards, 5:04.**

**Second quarter**

- CAR – Ryan Fitzgerald 35-yard field goal, 3:46. Tied 3–3. **Drive: 4 plays, 9 yards, 1:33.**

**Third quarter**

- SEA – Zach Charbonnet 2-yard run (Jason Myers kick), 8:45. Seahawks 10–3. **Drive: 6 plays, 21 yards, 3:16.**
- SEA – AJ Barner 17-yard pass from Sam Darnold (Jason Myers kick), 5:32. Seahawks 17–3. **Drive: 4 plays, 29 yards, 2:09.**

**Fourth quarter**

- CAR – Bryce Young 10-yard run (Ryan Fitzgerald kick), 13:41. Seahawks 17–10. **Drive: 13 plays, 69 yards, 6:51.**
- SEA – Jason Myers 30-yard field goal, 5:33. Seahawks 20–10. **Drive: 14 plays, 55 yards, 8:08.**
- SEA – Zach Charbonnet 1-yard run (Jason Myers kick), 2:31. Seahawks 27–10. **Drive: 5 plays, 25 yards, 1:09.**

**Top passers**

- SEA – Sam Darnold – 18/27, 147 yards, TD, INT
- CAR – Bryce Young – 14/24, 54 yards

**Top rushers**

- SEA – Zach Charbonnet – 18 rushes, 110 yards, 2 TD
- CAR – Rico Dowdle – 12 rushes, 59 yards

**Top receivers**

- SEA – Jaxon Smith-Njigba – 9 receptions, 72 yards
- CAR – Jalen Coker – 2 receptions, 16 yards

With the win, Seattle secured their first 13-win season since 2013 and finished 3–1 against the NFC South.

==== Week 18: at San Francisco 49ers ====
Week 18: Seattle Seahawks at San Francisco 49ers – Game summary

| Quarter | 1 | 2 | 3 | 4 | Total |
|---|---|---|---|---|---|
| **Seahawks** | 7 | 3 | 0 | 3 | **13** |
| 49ers | 0 | 3 | 0 | 0 | **3** |

at Levi's Stadium, Santa Clara, California

- Date: January 3
- Game time: 5:00 p.m. PST
- Game weather: Mostly cloudy, 57 °F (14 °C)
- Game attendance: 71,836
- Referee: Bill Vinovich
- TV announcers (ESPN/ABC): Joe Buck, Troy Aikman, Lisa Salters and Laura Rutledge
- Recap, Game Book

Game information

**First quarter**

- SEA – Zach Charbonnet 27-yard run (Jason Myers kick), 4:29. Seahawks 7–0. **Drive: 3 plays, 35 yards, 1:23.**

**Second quarter**

- SEA – Jason Myers 45-yard field goal, 5:19. Seahawks 10–0. **Drive: 9 plays, 33 yards, 4:16.**
- SF – Eddy Pineiro 48-yard field goal, 1:06. Seahawks 10–3. **Drive: 9 plays, 30 yards, 4:13.**

**Third quarter**

- No scoring plays

**Fourth quarter**

- SEA – Jason Myers 31-yard field goal, 14:15. Seahawks 13–3. **Drive: 11 plays, 55 yards, 5:16.**

**Top passers**

- SEA – Sam Darnold – 20/26, 198 yards
- SF – Brock Purdy – 19/27, 127 yards, INT

**Top rushers**

- SEA – Kenneth Walker III – 16 rushes, 97 yards
- SF – Christian McCaffrey – 8 rushes, 23 yards

**Top receivers**

- SEA – Jaxon Smith-Njigba – 6 receptions, 84 yards
- SF – Jauan Jennings – 4 receptions, 35 yards

The Seahawks defense stifled the 49ers’ high-powered offense and limited them to 173 total yards, their fewest in any regular-season game under head coach Kyle Shanahan.

With the win, Seattle clinched its first NFC West title since 2020 and secured the NFC’s No. 1 seed for the first time since 2014, and earned its very first 14-win season in franchise history.

=== Standings ===
==== Division ====
NFC West
| | W | L | T | PCT | DIV | CONF | PF | PA | STK |
|---|---|---|---|---|---|---|---|---|---|
| ^{(1)} Seattle Seahawks | 14 | 3 | 0 | .824 | 4–2 | 9–3 | 483 | 292 | W7 |
| ^{(5)} Los Angeles Rams | 12 | 5 | 0 | .706 | 4–2 | 7–5 | 518 | 346 | W1 |
| ^{(6)} San Francisco 49ers | 12 | 5 | 0 | .706 | 4–2 | 9–3 | 437 | 371 | L1 |
| Arizona Cardinals | 3 | 14 | 0 | .176 | 0–6 | 3–9 | 355 | 488 | L9 |

==== Conference ====
NFC
| Seed | Team | Division | W | L | T | PCT | DIV | CONF | SOS | SOV | STK |
|---|---|---|---|---|---|---|---|---|---|---|---|
**Division leaders**
| 1 | Seattle Seahawks | West | 14 | 3 | 0 | .824 | 4–2 | 9–3 | .498 | .471 | W7 |
| 2 (Note: Chicago finished ahead of Philadelphia based on head-to-head victory.) | Chicago Bears | North | 11 | 6 | 0 | .647 | 2–4 | 7–5 | .458 | .406 | L2 |
| 3 | Philadelphia Eagles | East | 11 | 6 | 0 | .647 | 3–3 | 8–4 | .476 | .455 | L1 |
| 4 (Note: Carolina finished ahead of Tampa Bay and Atlanta based on head-to-head record (Carolina 3–1 to Tampa Bay 2–2 and Atlanta 1–3).) | Carolina Panthers | South | 8 | 9 | 0 | .471 | 3–3 | 6–6 | .522 | .463 | L2 |
**Wild cards**
| 5 (Note: LA Rams finished ahead of San Francisco based on common games (LA Rams 9–3 to San Francisco 8–4 against: Arizona, Atlanta, Carolina, Houston, Indianapolis, Jacksonville, New Orleans, Seattle, Tampa Bay and Tennessee).) | Los Angeles Rams | West | 12 | 5 | 0 | .706 | 4–2 | 7–5 | .526 | .485 | W1 |
| 6 | San Francisco 49ers | West | 12 | 5 | 0 | .706 | 4–2 | 9–3 | .498 | .417 | L1 |
| 7 | Green Bay Packers | North | 9 | 7 | 1 | .559 | 4–2 | 7–4–1 | .483 | .431 | L4 |
**Did not qualify for the postseason**
| 8 (Note: Minnesota finished ahead of Detroit based on head-to-head sweep.) | Minnesota Vikings | North | 9 | 8 | 0 | .529 | 4–2 | 7–5 | .514 | .431 | W5 |
| 9 | Detroit Lions | North | 9 | 8 | 0 | .529 | 2–4 | 6–6 | .490 | .428 | W1 |
| 10 (Note: Tampa Bay finished ahead of Atlanta based on common games (Tampa Bay 6–6 to Atlanta 5–7 against: Arizona, Buffalo, Carolina, LA Rams, Miami, New England, New Orleans, NY Jets, San Francisco and Seattle).) | Tampa Bay Buccaneers | South | 8 | 9 | 0 | .471 | 3–3 | 6–6 | .529 | .485 | W1 |
| 11 | Atlanta Falcons | South | 8 | 9 | 0 | .471 | 3–3 | 7–5 | .495 | .449 | W4 |
| 12 | Dallas Cowboys | East | 7 | 9 | 1 | .441 | 4–2 | 4–7–1 | .438 | .311 | L1 |
| 13 | New Orleans Saints | South | 6 | 11 | 0 | .353 | 3–3 | 4–8 | .495 | .333 | L1 |
| 14 | Washington Commanders | East | 5 | 12 | 0 | .294 | 3–3 | 3–9 | .507 | .388 | W1 |
| 15 | New York Giants | East | 4 | 13 | 0 | .235 | 2–4 | 2–10 | .524 | .478 | W2 |
| 16 | Arizona Cardinals | West | 3 | 14 | 0 | .176 | 0–6 | 3–9 | .571 | .422 | L9 |
**Tiebreakers** (Note: When breaking ties for three or more teams under the NFL's rules, they are first broken within divisions, then comparing only the highest ranked remaining team from each division.)

== Postseason ==
=== Schedule ===
| Round | Date | Opponent (seed) | Result | Record | Venue | Sources |
|---|---|---|---|---|---|---|
| Wild Card | First-round bye | | | | | |
| Divisional | January 17 | San Francisco 49ers (6) | W 41–6 | 1–0 | Lumen Field | Recap |
| NFC Championship | January 25 | Los Angeles Rams (5) | W 31–27 | 2–0 | Lumen Field | Recap |
| Super Bowl LX | February 8 | vs. New England Patriots (A2) | W 29–13 | 3–0 | Levi's Stadium | Recap |

=== Game summaries ===
==== NFC Divisional Playoffs: vs. (6) San Francisco 49ers ====
NFC Divisional Playoffs: (6) San Francisco 49ers at (1) Seattle Seahawks – Game summary

| Quarter | 1 | 2 | 3 | 4 | Total |
|---|---|---|---|---|---|
| 49ers | 0 | 6 | 0 | 0 | 6 |
| Seahawks | 17 | 7 | 10 | 7 | 41 |

at Lumen Field, Seattle, Washington

- Date: January 17, 2026
- Game time: 5:15 p.m. PST
- Game weather: Clear, 46 °F (8 °C)
- Game attendance: 68,579
- Referee: John Hussey
- TV announcers (Fox): Kevin Burkhardt, Tom Brady, Erin Andrews and Tom Rinaldi
- Recap, Game Book

Game information

First quarter

- SEA – Rashid Shaheed 95-yard kickoff return (Jason Myers kick), 14:47. Seahawks 7–0.
- SEA – Jason Myers 31-yard field goal, 5:06. Seahawks 10–0. Drive: 11 plays, 44 yards, 6:10.
- SEA – Jaxon Smith-Njigba 4-yard pass from Sam Darnold (Jason Myers kick), 1:50. Seahawks 17–0. Drive: 5 plays, 42 yards, 2:27.

Second quarter

- SF – Eddy Pineiro 40-yard field goal, 11:58. Seahawks 17–3. Drive: 10 plays, 43 yards, 4:52.
- SF – Eddy Pineiro 56-yard field goal, 4:32. Seahawks 17–6. Drive: 10 plays, 57 yards, 5:40.
- SEA – Kenneth Walker III 7-yard run (Jason Myers kick), 0:31. Seahawks 24–6. Drive: 10 plays, 80 yards, 4:01.

Third quarter

- SEA – Jason Myers 24-yard field goal, 7:07. Seahawks 27–6. Drive: 8 plays, 36 yards, 4:59.
- SEA – Kenneth Walker III 15-yard run (Jason Myers kick), 2:23. Seahawks 34–6. Drive: 6 plays, 47 yards, 3:46.

Fourth quarter

- SEA – Kenneth Walker III 6-yard run (Jason Myers kick), 12:43. Seahawks 41–6. Drive: 5 plays, 37 yards, 2:58.

Top passers

- SF – Brock Purdy – 15/27, 140 yards, INT
- SEA – Sam Darnold – 12/17, 124 yards, TD

Top rushers

- SF – Brock Purdy – 5 rushes, 37 yards
- SEA – Kenneth Walker III – 19 rushes, 116 yards, 3 TD

Top receivers

- SF – Jake Tonges – 5 receptions, 59 yards
- SEA – Cooper Kupp – 5 receptions, 60 yards

This was the Seahawks' first home playoff game against the 49ers since 2013, their second playoff game against them since 2022, and their third postseason matchup overall. They utterly dominated from the first play, with Rashid Shaheed returning the opening kickoff for a touchdown, and only allowed six points while scoring in every quarter. Seattle forced six turnovers and scored points off of most of them. With their first postseason win since 2019, the Seahawks advanced to the NFC Championship Game for the first time since 2014 and secured their first home win against the 49ers since 2021.

==== NFC Championship: vs. (5) Los Angeles Rams ====
NFC Championship: (5) Los Angeles Rams at (1) Seattle Seahawks – Game summary

| Quarter | 1 | 2 | 3 | 4 | Total |
|---|---|---|---|---|---|
| Rams | 3 | 10 | 14 | 0 | 27 |
| Seahawks | 10 | 7 | 14 | 0 | 31 |

at Lumen Field, Seattle, Washington

- Date: January 25, 2026
- Game time: 3:40 p.m. PST
- Game weather: Sunny, 41 °F (5 °C)
- Game attendance: 68,773
- Referee: Clay Martin
- TV announcers (Fox): Kevin Burkhardt, Tom Brady, Erin Andrews and Tom Rinaldi
- Recap, Game Book

Game information

First quarter

- SEA – Kenneth Walker III 2-yard run (Jason Myers kick), 9:50. Seahawks 7–0. Drive: 7 plays, 81 yards, 3:36.
- LAR – Harrison Mevis 44-yard field goal, 8:50. Seahawks 7–3. Drive: 6 plays, 47 yards, 1:42.
- SEA – Jason Myers 27-yard field goal, 0:54. Seahawks 10–3. Drive: 12 plays, 56 yards, 7:21.

Second quarter

- LAR – Harrison Mevis 50-yard field goal, 12:21. Seahawks 10–6. Drive: 8 plays, 33 yards, 3:43.
- LAR – Kyren Williams 9–yard pass from Matthew Stafford (Harris Mevis kick), 1:55. Rams 13–10. Drive: 12 plays, 87 yards, 7:23.
- SEA – Jaxon Smith-Njigba 14-yard pass from Sam Darnold (Jason Myers kick), 0:20. Seahawks 17–13. Drive: 5 plays, 74 yards, 0:34.

Third quarter

- SEA – Jake Bobo 17-yard pass from Sam Darnold (Jason Myers kick), 12:02. Seahawks 24–13. Drive: 1 play, 17 yards, 0:05.
- LAR – Davante Adams 2-yard pass from Matthew Stafford (Harrison Mevis kick), 9:41. Seahwaks 24–20. Drive: 4 plays, 75 yards, 2:21.
- SEA – Cooper Kupp 13-yard pass from Sam Darnold (Jason Myers kick), 4:52. Seahawks 31–20. Drive: 9 plays, 65 yards, 4:49.
- LAR – Puka Nacua 34-yard pass from Matthew Stafford (Harrison Mevis kick), 2:06. Seahwaks 31–27. Drive: 5 plays, 87 yards, 2:46.

Fourth quarter

- No scoring plays

Top passers

- LAR – Matthew Stafford – 22/35, 374 yards, 3 TD
- SEA – Sam Darnold – 25/36, 346 yards, 3 TD

Top rushers

- LAR –Blake Corum – 9 rushes, 55 yards
- SEA – Kenneth Walker III – 19 rushes, 62 yards, TD

Top receivers

- LAR – Puka Nacua – 9 receptions, 165 yards, TD
- SEA – Jaxon Smith-Njigba – 10 receptions, 153 yards, TD

The teams traded the lead in the first half. Seattle scored a quick go-ahead touchdown just before halftime and led 17–13 at the intermission. There were two notable blunders in the third quarter, one by each team. Ram Xavier Smith had his second muffed punt return of the game; he tripped and touched the ball, which was recovered by Seahawk Dareke Young. On the very next play, Darnold threw a touchdown pass to Jake Bobo, extending the Seahawks' lead to 24–13. Later, trailing 31–20, Matthew Stafford had his 3rd down and 12 pass attempt broken up by Riq Woolen, but then Woolen was called for a taunting penalty, giving the Rams new life. On the next play, Stafford tossed a touchdown pass to Puka Nacua, who was being defended by Woolen, leaving the Rams trailing by only four points. However, they were unable to score again, and the Seahawks were off to the Super Bowl.

With their first playoff win over the Rams in franchise history, the Seahawks secured their first win in the NFC Championship game since 2014 and improved to 4–0 in the NFC Championship.

==== Super Bowl LX: vs. (A2) New England Patriots ====
Super Bowl LX: (N1) Seattle Seahawks vs. (A2) New England Patriots – Game summary

| Quarter | 1 | 2 | 3 | 4 | Total |
|---|---|---|---|---|---|
| Seahawks | 3 | 6 | 3 | 17 | 29 |
| Patriots | 0 | 0 | 0 | 13 | 13 |

at Levi's Stadium, Santa Clara, California

- Date: February 8, 2026
- Game time: 3:40 p.m. PST
- Game weather: Fair, 67 °F (19 °C)
- Game attendance: 70,823
- Referee: Shawn Smith
- TV announcers (NBC): Mike Tirico, Cris Collinsworth, Melissa Stark and Kaylee Hartung
- Recap, Game Book

Game information

First quarter

- SEA – Jason Myers 33-yard field goal, 11:58. Seahawks 3–0. Drive: 8 plays, 51 yards, 3:02.

Second quarter

- SEA – Jason Myers 39-yard field goal, 11:16. Seahawks 6–0. Drive: 8 plays, 55 yards, 2:54.
- SEA – Jason Myers 41-yard field goal, 0:11. Seahawks 9–0. Drive: 9 plays, 34 yards, 2:39.

Third quarter

- SEA – Jason Myers 41-yard field goal, 9:12. Seahawks 12–0. Drive: 10 plays, 69 yards, 4:50.

Fourth quarter

- SEA – AJ Barner 16-yard pass from Sam Darnold (Jason Myers kick), 13:24. Seahawks 19–0. Drive: 5 plays, 37 yards, 1:46.
- NE – Mack Hollins 35-yard pass from Drake Maye (Andres Borregales kick), 12:27. Seahawks 19–7. Drive: 3 plays, 65 yards, 0:57.
- SEA – Jason Myers 26-yard field goal, 5:35. Seahawks 22–7. Drive: 6 plays, 30 yards, 3:02.
- SEA – Uchenna Nwosu 44-yard interception return (Jason Myers kick), 4:27. Seahawks 29–7.
- NE – Rhamondre Stevenson 7-yard pass from Drake Maye (pass failed), 2:21. Seahawks 29–13. Drive: 8 plays, 65 yards, 2:06.

Top passers

- SEA – Sam Darnold – 19/38, 202 yards, TD
- NE – Drake Maye – 27/43, 295 yards, 2 TD, 2 INT

Top rushers

- SEA – Kenneth Walker III – 27 rushes, 135 yards
- NE – Drake Maye – 5 rushes, 37 yards

Top receivers

- SEA – Cooper Kupp – 6 receptions, 61 yards
- NE – Mack Hollins – 4 receptions, 78 yards, TD

Both defenses played well, putting intense pressure on each quarterback throughout the game. However, Darnold was able to evade the pressure well enough to extend drives and eke out four field goals—the only scoring until the fourth quarter—with the help of effective running by eventual Super Bowl Most Valuable Player Kenneth Walker III. By contrast, Patriots quarterback Drake Maye was sacked six times, breaking Joe Burrow's record for most sacks in a single postseason with 21, and was ineffective for most of the game. In the final quarter, each quarterback finally threw a touchdown pass, and Jason Myers set a Super Bowl record with his fifth field goal, but three Maye turnovers—a fumble and two interceptions, including a pick six by Uchenna Nwosu—led to 17 Seahawks points. Maye ended the scoring with a second touchdown completion in garbage time.

The Seahawks clinched their first Super Bowl title since 2013 and their second in franchise history. This also marked Sam Darnold's first win over the Patriots. At age 38, Mike Macdonald became the third-youngest head coach to win a Super Bowl, behind Sean McVay and Mike Tomlin. Darnold (who had led the league in turnovers in the regular season) and the Seahawks (second in regular season turnovers) became the first Super Bowl champions to commit no turnovers in their postseason run.

To celebrate the win, Seattle-based Starbucks announced that locations along the Super Bowl Victory Parade and in downtown Seattle would sell World Champions rally cards. In addition, Starbucks announced that fans with tickets to the Super Bowl Victory Parade would be given one World Champions rally card for free.
