= John Schneider (American football executive) =

American football executive (born 1971)

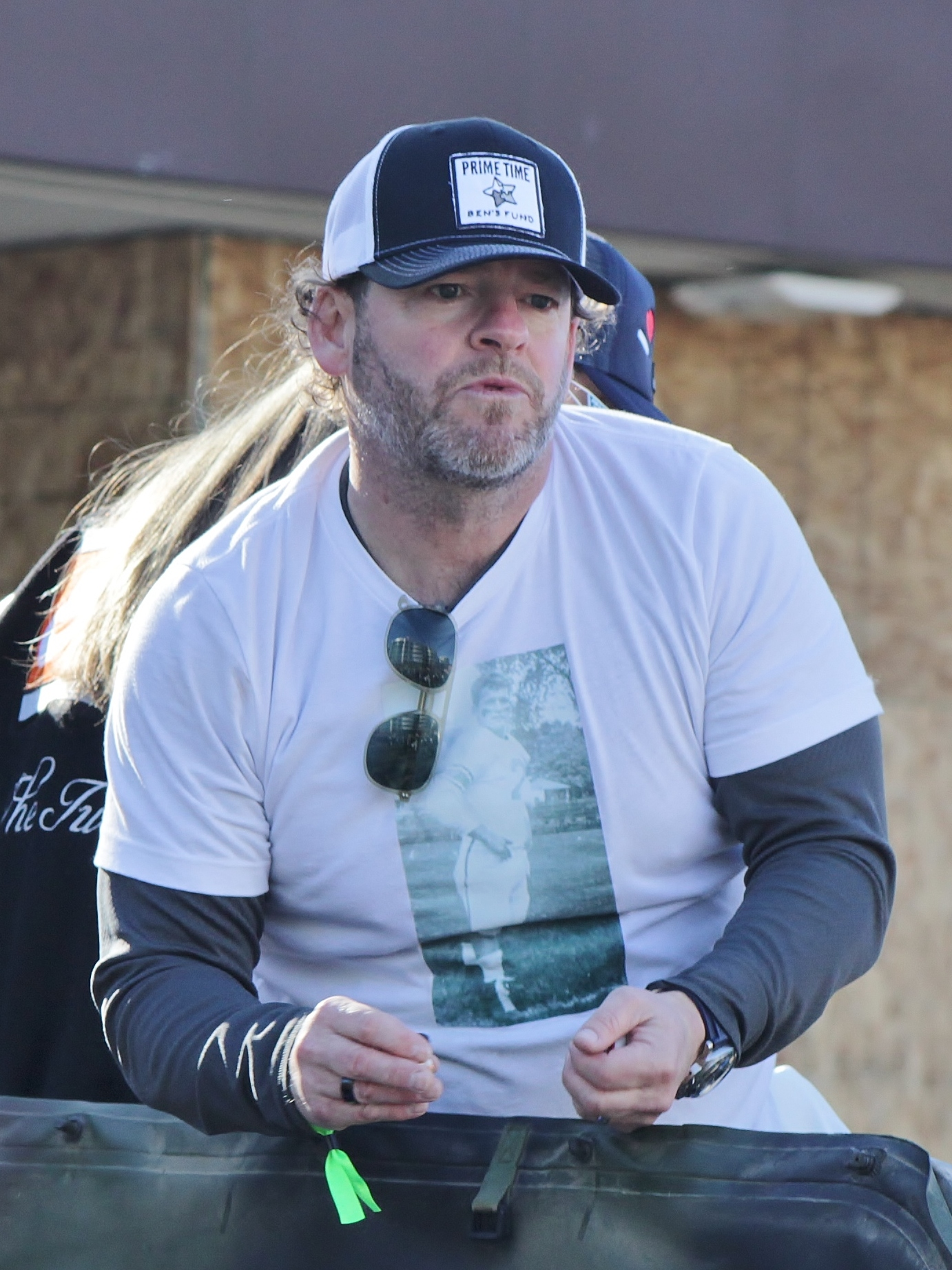
- Schneider in 2026

Seattle Seahawks
- Title: President of football operations/general manager

Personal information
- Born: May 25, 1971 (age 55); De Pere, Wisconsin, U.S.

Career information
- College: St. Thomas

Career history
- Green Bay Packers (1993–1996) Scout; Kansas City Chiefs (1997–1999) Director of pro personnel; Seattle Seahawks (2000) Director of player personnel; Washington Redskins (2001) Vice president of player personnel; Green Bay Packers (2002–2009); Top personnel aide to general manager (2002–2007); Director of football operations (2008–2009); Seattle Seahawks (2010–present); General manager and executive vice president (2010–2023); General manager and president of football operations (2024–present)

Awards and highlights
- 3× Super Bowl champion (XXXI, XLVIII, LX); The Sporting News Executive of the Year (2025)
- Executive profile at Pro Football Reference

John Schneider (born May 25, 1971) is an American professional football executive who is the president of football operations and general manager of the Seattle Seahawks of the National Football League (NFL). Schneider was previously an executive for the Washington Redskins and Green Bay Packers in the 2000s. He was a primary architect in building the Seahawks rosters that won Super Bowl XLVIII and Super Bowl LX, and is the only general manager in NFL history to reach and win multiple Super Bowls with the same organization and completely different rosters and head coaches.

== Early life ==
Schneider grew up in Wisconsin and attended high school in De Pere at Abbot Pennings High School, where he played football and graduated in 1989. He studied history and secondary education at the University of St. Thomas and was on the football team his freshman year until injuries caused him to retire. During his junior year, he wrote a letter to Ron Wolf asking if he could work as a scout. His internship that summer was the beginning of his relationship with the Green Bay Packers.

== Professional executive career ==
=== As an assistant ===
==== Green Bay Packers ====
Schneider started working in the scouting department of the Green Bay Packers in 1993.

==== Kansas City Chiefs ====
He was the director of pro personnel for the Chiefs from 1997 to 2000.

==== Seattle Seahawks ====
He worked for the Seahawks in 2000 under Ted Thompson as director of player personnel.

==== Washington Redskins ====
In 2001, Schneider became the vice president of player personnel.

==== Green Bay Packers ====
Schneider went back to the Green Bay Packers as the top personnel aide to the general manager. He was then elevated to director of football operations.

=== As general manager ===
==== Seattle Seahawks ====
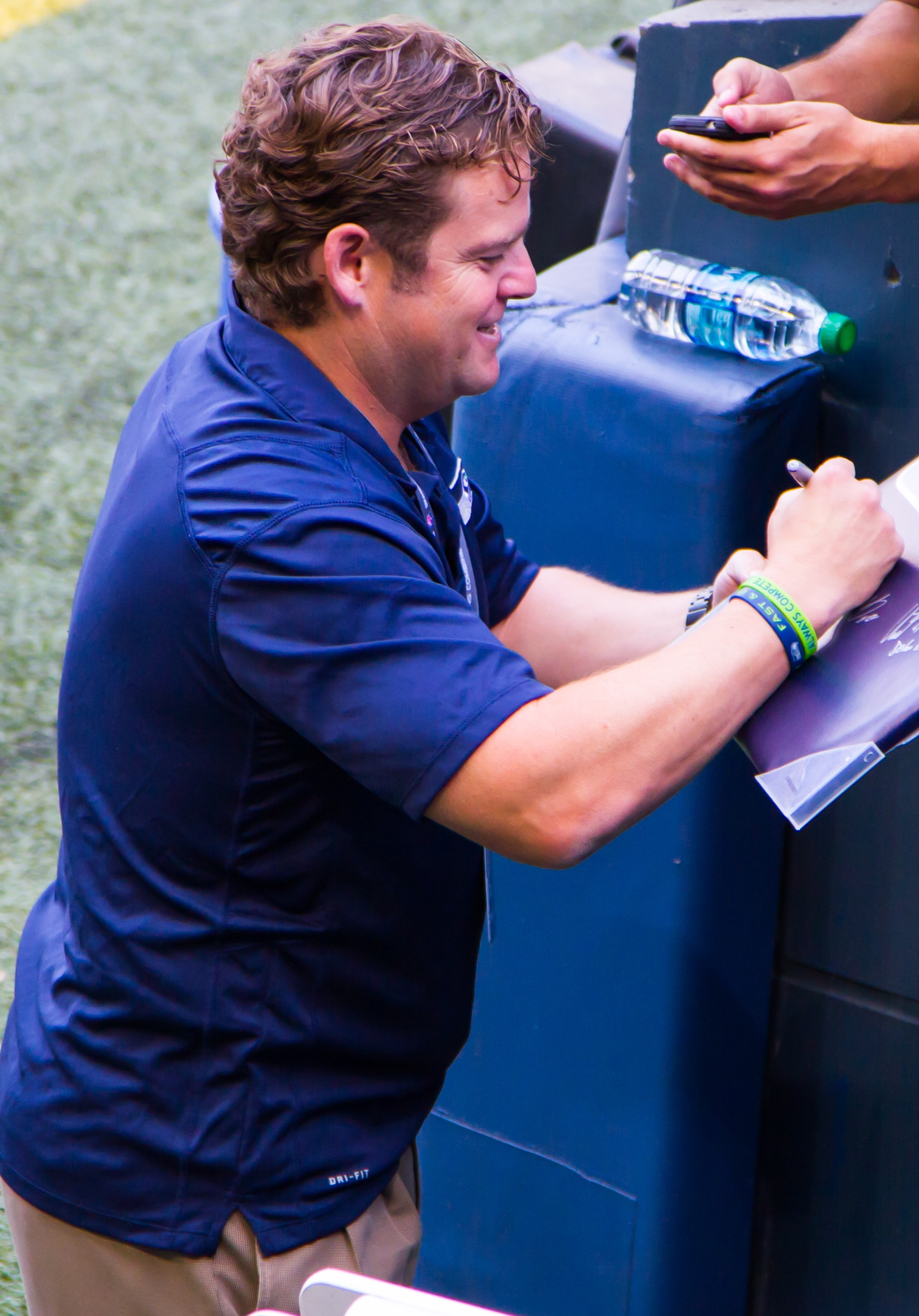
Schneider in 2014

On January 11, 2010, the Seahawks announced the hiring of Pete Carroll as head coach and vice president of football operations. One week later, on January 18, 2010, the Seahawks announced the hiring of Schneider as their general manager. Schneider added the distinction of executive vice president in 2013. In this role, he managed all aspects of the Seahawks roster and draft process while working collaboratively with Carroll in all facets of the football operations department.

==== Early years and Legion of Boom (2010–2018) ====
Since arriving in Seattle, Schneider and Carroll orchestrated a complete overhaul of Seattle's roster. In 2010, Schneider completed 284 roster transactions, including trading for running back Marshawn Lynch. On February 2, 2014, the Seahawks won Super Bowl XLVIII, their first championship in franchise history. Of those on the championship roster, only Max Unger, Red Bryant, Jon Ryan, and Brandon Mebane were Seahawks prior to Schneider's arrival in Seattle. Schneider and Seattle followed their Super Bowl win with another NFC Championship, but lost to New England in Super Bowl XLIX.

Notable draft picks of Schneider involved in winning the Super Bowl XLVIII included Russell Wilson, Richard Sherman, Kam Chancellor, Byron Maxwell, K. J. Wright, Bobby Wagner, and Earl Thomas. He also acquired undrafted receiver duo Doug Baldwin and Jermaine Kearse. Notable free agents were Michael Bennett, Cliff Avril, and Brandon Browner. These defensive players soon became known as the Legion of Boom due to their hard-hitting style of defense.

In 2015, the Seahawks clinched a wild card berth but fell in the NFC Divisional Round to the Panthers. Schneider signed a five-year contract extension with the Seahawks in July 2016 that kept him in Seattle through the 2021 season. The Seahawks won their fourth NFC West title under Schneider in 2016 but were eliminated in the divisional round of the playoffs for the second straight year. In 2021, Schneider signed a six-year contract extension with the Seahawks that will keep him in Seattle through the 2027 draft.

==== Years of transition (2018–2023) ====
Despite the regression of the defense, the Seahawks remained a top team in the NFL due to the stellar play of quarterback Russell Wilson and the emergence of the receiver duo of 2015 3rd-round pick Tyler Lockett and 2019 2nd-round pick DK Metcalf. Schneider also traded for Duane Brown, Quandre Diggs, and Jamal Adams during that time.

After missing the playoffs in 2021, Schneider traded franchise quarterback Russell Wilson to the Broncos for two first-round picks (used on Charles Cross and Devon Witherspoon) and two second-round picks (used on Boye Mafe and Derick Hall), and for Broncos players Drew Lock, Shelby Harris, and Noah Fant.

==== Macdonald era and 2nd Super Bowl title (2023–present) ====
After the 2023 season, Carroll was fired by owner Jody Allen, likely as a result of the team failing to make the playoffs in two of the previous three seasons. Schneider gained final say over all football-related decisions—a responsibility previously held by Carroll. While conducting the search for a new head coach—the first of his tenure as general manager—he and the search committee interviewed Ejiro Evero, Patrick Graham, Mike Kafka, Bobby Slowik, Frank Smith, eventual new Bears head coach Ben Johnson, eventual new Commanders head coach Dan Quinn, and eventual new Falcons head coach Raheem Morris. In the end, Schneider hired Ravens defensive coordinator Mike Macdonald as the new head coach for the Seahawks, signing him to a six-year contract. This made Macdonald the youngest active head coach in the NFL to date. The Seahawks finished the 2024 season with a 10-7 record, narrowly missing out on the playoffs. It was the winningest season with a first-year head coach in franchise history.

On July 30, 2025, Schneider and the Seahawks agreed to a four-year contract extension.

Before the 2025 season, Schneider made roster reconstructions by releasing veteran receiver Tyler Lockett and trading starting quarterback Geno Smith to the Las Vegas Raiders as well as star wide receiver DK Metcalf to the Pittsburgh Steelers. He signed quarterback Sam Darnold, wide receiver Cooper Kupp and defensive end DeMarcus Lawrence and traded for linebacker Ernest Jones IV. The Seahawks finished the regular season as the number one seed in the NFC and won their fourth NFC Championship to reach Super Bowl LX, making Schneider the first NFL general manager to reach multiple Super Bowls with an entirely different roster and head coach. The Seahawks went on to win Super Bowl LX, defeating the New England Patriots 29-13.

== Executive Tree ==
Multiple assistants of Schneider have been hired to be General Managers elsewhere:

- John Idzik Jr., New York Jets (2013–2014)
- Scot McCloughan, Washington Redskins (2015–2016)
- Scott Fitterer, Carolina Panthers (2021–2023)
- Dan Morgan, Carolina Panthers (2024–present)
- Nolan Teasley, Minnesota Vikings (2026-present)

== Personal life ==
Schneider and his wife Traci have two sons, Ben and Jack. The couple founded Ben's Fund in 2012 in honor of their son, Ben, who was diagnosed with autism at the age of three. The intent of Ben's Fund is to provide financial support to children and young adults with autism in Washington State along with guidance and support as they continue their journey.
