= Ty Okada =

American football player (born 1999)

No. 39 – Seattle Seahawks
- Position: Free safety
- Roster status: Active

Personal information
- Born: June 4, 1999 (age 27); Woodbury, Minnesota, U.S.
- Listed height: 5 ft 11 in (1.80 m)
- Listed weight: 193 lb (88 kg)

Career information
- High school: East Ridge (Woodbury)
- College: Montana State (2017–2022)
- NFL draft: 2023: undrafted

Career history
- Seattle Seahawks (2023–present)

Awards and highlights
- Super Bowl champion (LX); 2× Second-team All-Big Sky (2021, 2022)

Career NFL statistics as of Week 9, 2026
- Total tackles: 90
- Sacks: 1.5
- Pass deflections: 8
- Interceptions: 2
- Fumble recoveries: 1
- Stats at Pro Football Reference

Tyler Okada (born June 4, 1999) is an American professional football free safety for the Seattle Seahawks of the National Football League (NFL). He played college football for the Montana State Bobcats.

== Early life ==
Ty Okada grew up in Woodbury, Minnesota, and attended East Ridge High School. He was a two-time All-Section selection and 2017 All-Star selection in baseball during his high school career. Okada was a multiple team captain for wrestling and also a two-time MSHSL State qualifier, earning All-State honors his sophomore year. In football, Okada was named team captain his senior season and earned the All-District Offensive Player of the Year honors as a quarterback.

== College career ==
Okada joined the Montana State Bobcats as a walk-on and redshirted his true freshman season where he won the "Young Gun" award. He played mostly on special teams as a redshirt freshman. During his redshirt sophomore season, Okada missed most of the regular season due to injury. Okada would return to start for the Bobcats after the injury to make his first career start at safety during the first round of the Football Championship Subdivision playoffs against Incarnate Word. During that redshirt sophomore season, Okada also earned the Montana State coaches' award for Special Teams Player of the Year. he was named second-team All-Big Sky Conference as a redshirt junior after making 78 tackles with six tackles for loss, two interceptions, and eight passes broken up while helping lead his team to the FCS National Championship Game in Frisco, Texas. He repeated as a second-team All-Big Sky selection after finishing his redshirt senior season with 73 tackles, three sacks, one interception, a blocked punt against Eastern Washington, and led the team with ten passes broken up.

== Professional career ==
Pre-draft measurables
| Height | Weight | Arm length | Hand span | Wingspan | 40-yard dash | 10-yard split | 20-yard split | 20-yard shuttle | Three-cone drill | Vertical jump | Broad jump | Bench press |
|---|---|---|---|---|---|---|---|---|---|---|---|---|
| 5 ft 10 3/4 in (1.80 m) | 193 lb (88 kg) | 31 in (0.79 m) | 9 1/2 in (0.24 m) | 6 ft 1 1/4 in (1.86 m) | 4.47 s | 1.58 s | 2.56 s | 3.98 s | 6.85 s | 40.5 in (1.03 m) | 10 ft 9 in (3.28 m) | 16 reps |
All values from Pro Day

Okada was signed by the Seattle Seahawks as an undrafted free agent on May 12, 2023. He was waived on August 29, 2023, and re-signed to the practice squad. Okada was elevated to the active roster on November 18, 2023. He was promoted to the active roster on December 30.

Okada was waived by the Seahawks on August 27, 2024, and re-signed to the practice squad. On October 16, he was signed to the active roster following an injury to starting safety Rayshawn Jenkins. He was waived on October 24, and re-signed to the practice squad. He signed a reserve/future contract on January 6, 2025. Designated as an exclusive rights free agent in the 2026 offseason, the Seahawks tendered him on March 2, 2026.

== NFL career statistics ==
Legend
| | Won the Super Bowl |
| **Bold** | Career high |

=== Regular season ===
| Year | Team | Games | | Tackles | | | | | Interceptions | | | | | | Fumbles | | | | |
| Year | Team | GP | GS | Cmb | Solo | Ast | Sck | TFL | Int | Yds | Avg | Lng | TD | PD | FF | Fmb | FR | Yds | TD |
|---|---|---|---|---|---|---|---|---|---|---|---|---|---|---|---|---|---|---|---|
| 2023 | SEA | 5 | 0 | 1 | 0 | 1 | 0.0 | 0 | 0 | 0 | 0.0 | 0 | 0 | 0 | 0 | 0 | 0 | 0 | 0 |
| 2024 | SEA | 4 | 0 | 3 | 1 | 2 | 0.0 | 0 | 0 | 0 | 0.0 | 0 | 0 | 0 | 0 | 0 | 0 | 0 | 0 |
| 2025 | SEA | 17 | 11 | **65** | **46** | **19** | **1.5** | **3** | **1** | 0 | 0.0 | 0 | 0 | **6** | 0 | 0 | **1** | 0 | 0 |
| Career | | 26 | 11 | 69 | 47 | 22 | 1.5 | 3 | 1 | 0 | 0.0 | 0 | 0 | 6 | 0 | 0 | 1 | 0 | 0 |

=== Postseason ===
| Year | Team | Games | | Tackles | | | | | Interceptions | | | | | | Fumbles | | | | |
| Year | Team | GP | GS | Cmb | Solo | Ast | Sck | TFL | Int | Yds | Avg | Lng | TD | PD | FF | Fmb | FR | Yds | TD |
|---|---|---|---|---|---|---|---|---|---|---|---|---|---|---|---|---|---|---|---|
| 2025 | SEA | 3 | 0 | 2 | 1 | 1 | 0.0 | 0 | 0 | 0 | 0.0 | 0 | 0 | 0 | 0 | 0 | 0 | 0 | 0 |
| Career | | 3 | 0 | 2 | 1 | 1 | 0.0 | 0 | 0 | 0 | 0.0 | 0 | 0 | 0 | 0 | 0 | 0 | 0 | 0 |

== Personal life ==
Okada has Celiac Disease, and follows a gluten-free diet. His favorite meal is gluten-free spaghetti.

Okada attended an immersion school for much of his youth, and is fluent in Spanish.

During media week for Super Bowl LX, Okada stated that his last name is Japanese. Originating from his great-great-grandfather, Shigetomo Okada, who immigrated to the United States through Seattle before settling in Minnesota to study engineering.
