= Rashid Shaheed =

American football player (born 1998)

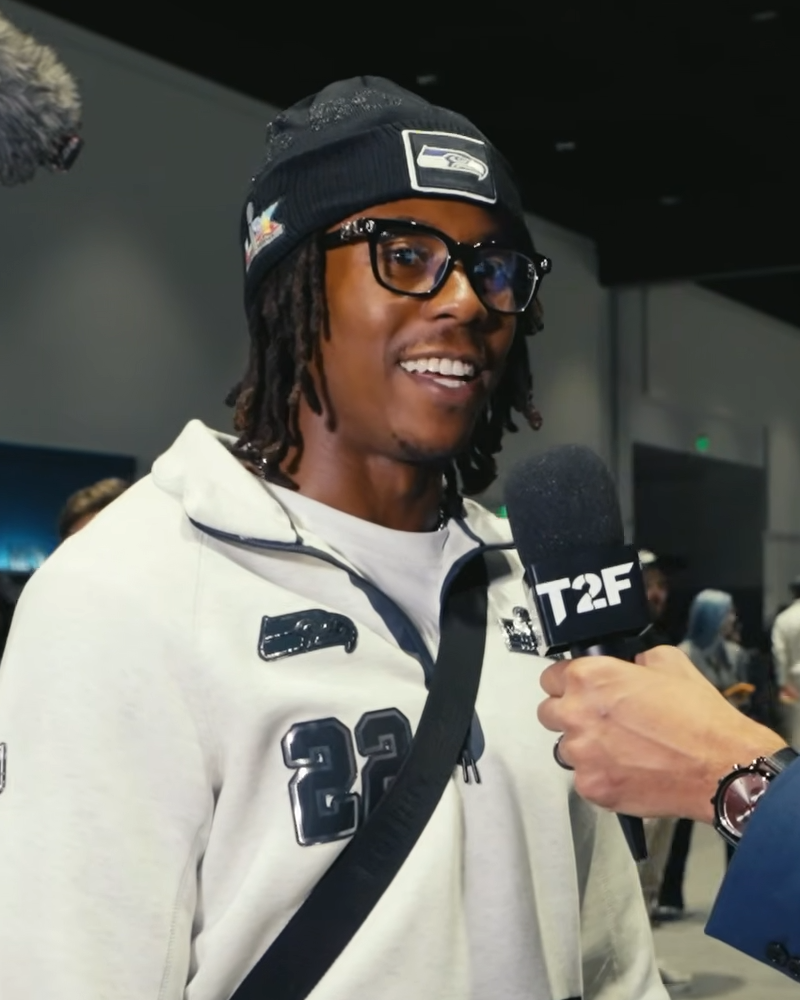
- Shaheed in 2026

No. 22 – Seattle Seahawks
- Positions: Wide receiver, Return specialist
- Roster status: Active

Personal information
- Born: August 31, 1998 (age 28); Phoenix, Arizona, U.S.
- Listed height: 5 ft 11 in (1.80 m)
- Listed weight: 185 lb (84 kg)

Career information
- High school: Mt. Carmel (San Diego, California)
- College: Weber State (2017–2021)
- NFL draft: 2022: undrafted

Career history
- New Orleans Saints (2022–2025); Seattle Seahawks (2025–present)

Awards and highlights
- Super Bowl champion (LX); First-team All-Pro (2023) (Note: Selected as a punt returner); 2× Pro Bowl (2023, 2025); 4× All-American (2017, 2018, 2020, 2021); First-team Big Sky Conference (2021); Second-team Big Sky Conference (2021)

Career NFL statistics as of Week 6, 2026
- Receptions: 167
- Receiving yards: 2,405
- Receiving touchdowns: 12
- Rushing yards: 231
- Rushing touchdowns: 2
- Return yards: 2,890
- Return touchdowns: 4
- Stats at Pro Football Reference

Rashid Khalil Shaheed (born August 31, 1998) is an American professional football wide receiver and return specialist for the Seattle Seahawks of the National Football League (NFL). He played college football for the Weber State Wildcats and signed with the New Orleans Saints as an undrafted free agent in 2022. Midway through the 2025 season, the Saints traded Shaheed to the Seahawks, where he won Super Bowl LX.

== Early life ==
Shaheed grew up in a family of track and field athletes; his father Haneef was a sprinter at Arizona State University, and his mother Cossandra ran the 400 meter hurdles at the University of San Diego. Shaheed, along with his sisters Aysha and Amirah, followed in their footsteps, posting competitive results in track events, while Shaheed convinced his parents to also allow him to play football.

Shaheed attended Mt. Carmel High School in San Diego, California, from 2013 to 2016, where he played receiver and running back, producing 3,748 total yards and 24 touchdowns, while winning San Diego section titles in the 200m and 400m. Shaheed initially planned to attend the University of Southern California on a track and field scholarship, but eventually settled on pursuing his true passion of football, committing to Weber State.

== College career ==
Shaheed played college football for the Weber State Wildcats from 2017 to 2021. The only player in school history to earn All-American honors four times, Shaheed set the FCS all-time record for career kickoff return touchdowns with seven, and had a 100-yard return in Weber State's 2021 win over Northern Arizona.

He finished his career at Weber State with 5,478 all-purpose yards, ranked as the third most in Weber State history. He ended up seventh in career receiving yards with 2,178 yards and 18 touchdowns at Weber State, and 10th in school history for career receptions with 147. He had a remarkable kick return average of 29.1 yards per return, and also finished third in career punt return yardage.

== Professional career ==
Pre-draft measurables
Height	Weight	Arm length	Hand span	Wingspan	Bench press
5 ft 10 5/8 in (1.79 m)	185 lb (84 kg)	31 1/8 in (0.79 m)	9 1/2 in (0.24 m)	6 ft 3 7/8 in (1.93 m)	10 reps
All values from Pro Day

=== New Orleans Saints ===
On May 2, 2022, Shaheed signed with the New Orleans Saints as an undrafted free agent. On August 30, Shaheed was released by the Saints; he was re-signed to the team's practice squad the next day. October 15, Shaheed was signed to the Saints' active roster. On October 16, in his NFL debut, he had a 44-yard rushing touchdown on his first career touch. On October 20 against the Arizona Cardinals, in his second career game, he caught a 53-yard touchdown pass from quarterback Andy Dalton. The reception was his first career catch and only his second offensive touch. As a rookie, he finished with 28 receptions for 488 yards and two receiving touchdowns to go with a rushing touchdown.

Shaheed started his career wearing number 89 but switched to 22 before the 2023 season. In Week 8 against the Indianapolis Colts, Shaheed enjoyed a career game, hauling in three receptions for 153 yards and a touchdown in the 38–27 victory. He finished the 2023 season with 46 receptions for 719 yards and five touchdowns.

On January 3, 2024, it was announced that Shaheed was selected to play in the 2024 Pro Bowl Games in Orlando, Florida. He was tendered by the Saints as an Exclusive Rights free agent in March – worth the NFL minimum salary – where he could not negotiate with other teams as a result of being undrafted and with less than three years of experience. Shaheed would be eligible for a contract extension in 2025. However, on July 20, Shaheed and the Saints agreed to a one–year, $5.2 million contract extension. On October 17, Shaheed was placed on injured reserve after he underwent season-ending knee surgery to repair his meniscus; prior to the injury, he led the league with 15.9 yards per punt return. He finished with 20 receptions for 349 yards and five touchdowns.

On October 5, 2025, Shaheed scored a career-long 87-yard touchdown reception from Spencer Rattler in a 26–14 victory over the New York Giants. In nine starts for New Orleans, he recorded 44 receptions for 499 yards and two touchdowns, paired with two rush attempts for five yards.

=== Seattle Seahawks ===
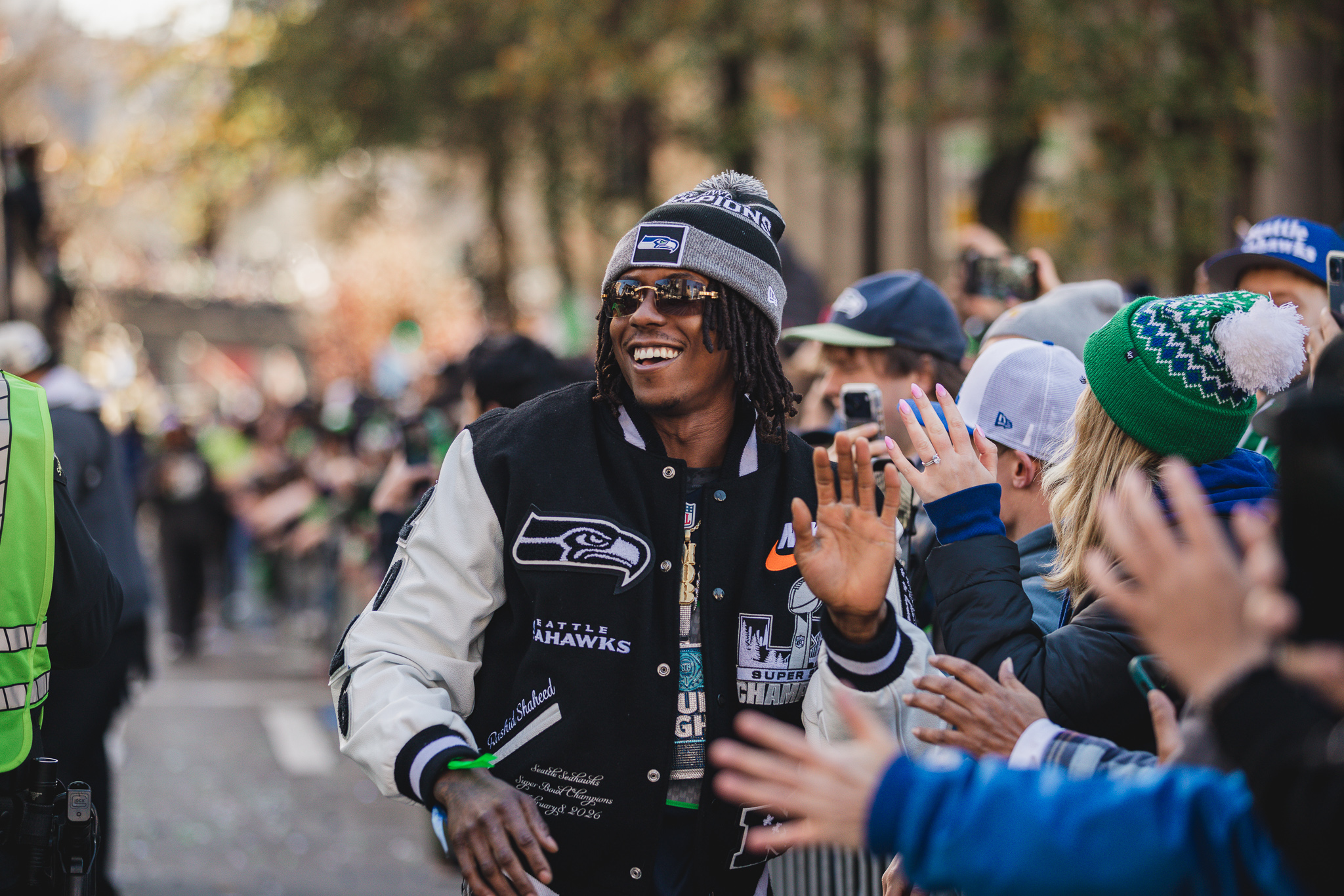
Shaheed celebrating with fans at the Super Bowl LX victory parade

On November 4, 2025, Shaheed was traded to the Seattle Seahawks in exchange for 2026 fourth and fifth-round picks. In Week 14 against the Atlanta Falcons, Shaheed returned the second-half opening kickoff for a 100-yard touchdown, and was named NFC Special Teams Player of the Week for his performance. In Week 16 against the Los Angeles Rams, Shaheed returned a 58-yard punt for a touchdown in the 38–37 comeback win in overtime. It was announced on December 23 that Shaheed had made his second Pro Bowl as a kick returner. In the 2025 season, he had 59 receptions for 687 yards and two touchdowns to go with a kick return touchdown and a punt return touchdown combined with his time with the Saints.

On January 17, 2026, Shaheed returned the opening kickoff in a Divisional Round playoff game against the San Francisco 49ers for a touchdown in a 41–6 blowout victory. On February 8, Shaheed caught two passes for 27 yards in Super Bowl LX, in which the Seahawks won 29–13.

On March 11, 2026, Shaheed signed a three-year, $51 million contract extension to stay with the Seahawks.

== NFL career statistics ==
Legend
	Won the Super Bowl
	Led the league
**Bold**	Career High

=== Regular season ===
Year	Team	Games		Receiving					Rushing					Kick returns					Punt returns					Fumbles	
Year	Team	GP	GS	Rec	Yds	Avg	Lng	TD	Att	Yds	Avg	Lng	TD	Ret	Yds	Avg	Lng	TD	Ret	Yds	Avg	Lng	TD	Fum	Lost
2022	NO	12	6	28	488	17.4	68	2	4	57	**14.3**	**44**	**1**	14	320	22.9	31	0	20	193	9.7	42	0	1	0
2023	NO	15	8	**46**	**719**	15.6	58	**5**	**7**	37	5.3	12	0	**18**	384	21.3	28	0	**25**	**339**	13.6	**76**	**1**	1	**1**
2024	NO	6	5	20	349	**17.5**	70	3	6	29	4.8	13	0	6	171	28.5	38	0	9	143	15.9	54	**1**	1	**1**
2025	NO	9	9	44	499	11.3	**87**	2	2	5	2.5	5	0	1	29	29.0	29	0	10	129	12.9	40	0	1	0
2025	SEA	9	4	15	188	12.5	33	0	**7**	**64**	9.1	31	0	14	**418**	**29.9**	**100**	**1**	13	210	**16.2**	58	**1**	1	0
2026	SEA	6	3	14	162	11.6	42	0	4	39	9.8	28	1	16	436	27.3	39	0	12	118	9.8	31	0	4	0
Career		57	35	167	2,405	14.4	87	12	30	231	7.7	44	2	69	1,758	25.5	100	1	89	1,132	12.7	76	3	9	2

=== Postseason ===
Year	Team	Games		Receiving					Rushing					Kick returns					Punt returns					Fumbles	
Year	Team	GP	GS	Rec	Yds	Avg	Lng	TD	Att	Yds	Avg	Lng	TD	Ret	Yds	Avg	Lng	TD	Ret	Yds	Avg	Lng	TD	Fum	Lost
2025	SEA	3	1	3	78	26.0	51	0	4	22	5.5	30	0	4	167	41.8	95	1	2	16	8.0	10	0	0	0
Career		3	1	3	78	26.0	51	0	4	22	5.5	30	0	4	167	41.8	95	1	2	16	8.0	10	0	0	0
