= Derick Hall =

American football player (born 2001)

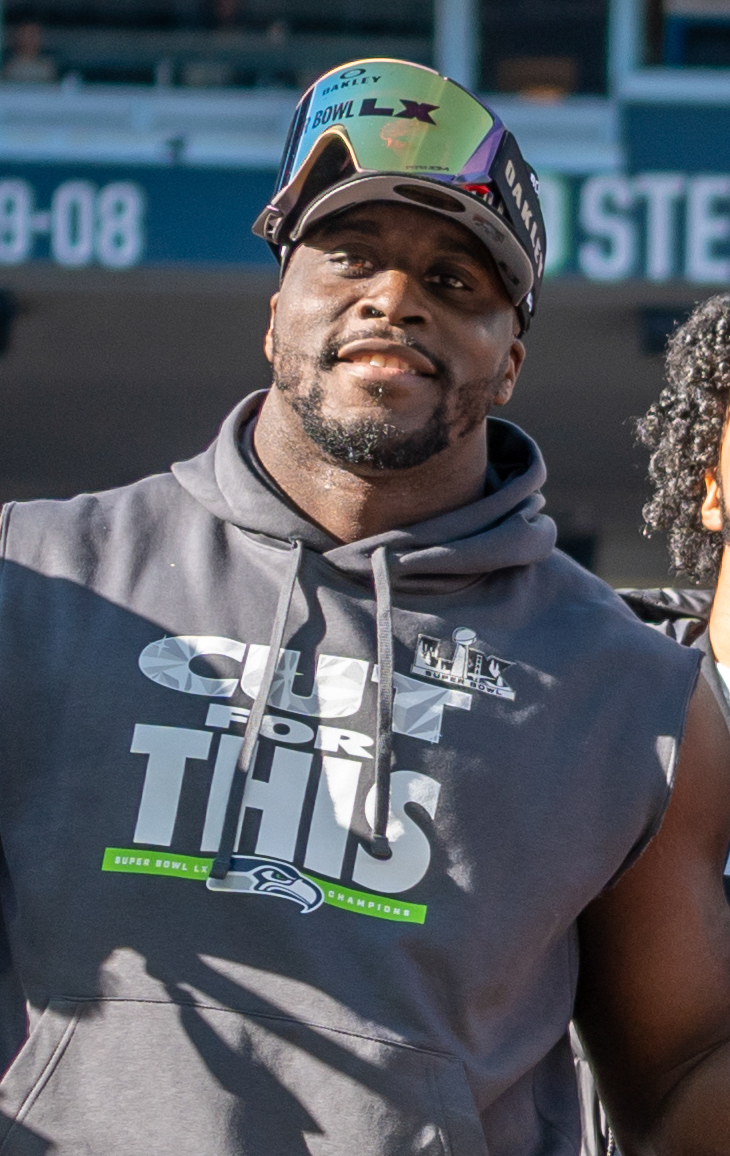
- Hall with the Seattle Seahawks in 2026

No. 58 – Seattle Seahawks
- Position: Outside linebacker
- Roster status: Active

Personal information
- Born: March 19, 2001 (age 25); Gulfport, Mississippi, U.S.
- Listed height: 6 ft 3 in (1.91 m)
- Listed weight: 260 lb (118 kg)

Career information
- High school: Gulfport
- College: Auburn (2019–2022)
- NFL draft: 2023: 2nd round, 37th overall pick

Career history
- Seattle Seahawks (2023–present)

Awards and highlights
- Super Bowl champion (LX); First-team All-SEC (2022); Second-team All-SEC (2021)

Career NFL statistics as of Week 7, 2026
- Total tackles: 121
- Sacks: 13
- Forced fumbles: 3
- Fumble recoveries: 2
- Pass deflections: 3
- Defensive touchdowns: 1
- Stats at Pro Football Reference

Derick Hall (born March 19, 2001) is an American professional football outside linebacker for the Seattle Seahawks of the National Football League (NFL). He played college football for the Auburn Tigers.

== Early life ==
Hall was born on March 19, 2001, in Gulfport, Mississippi. He was born four months premature, and was dead at birth without a heartbeat before being resuscitated. Weighing just 2 pounds and 1 ounce at birth, with brain bleeding, he spent a week on life support. Believing that he would likely be in a permanent vegetative state, doctors advised his mother Stacy Gooden-Crandle to allow life support to be discontinued, but she refused. Hall would spend five months in the NICU on a ventilator before finally going home with his family. In his early years he would be frequently hospitalized and suffered from asthma. Hall began playing flag football when he was 4, and tackle football when he was 9. He attended Gulfport High School where he played both offense and defense. Coming out of high school, he was a four-star prospect by Rivals.com, the 147th overall recruit and the 8th ranked weakside defensive end. He committed to play college football at Auburn University over Mississippi State and Ole Miss, citing his relationship with Auburn assistant coach Rodney Garner as the reason for his commitment.

== College career ==
Hall was primarily a rotational player as a freshman and sophomore, recording a total of 34 tackles and four sacks. Hall became a starter as a junior, where he recorded 52 total tackles and nine sacks. As a senior, Hall recorded 60 total tackles, seven sacks, two forced fumbles, and one interception He was named second-team All-Southeastern Conference (SEC) in 2021 and first-team All-SEC in 2022. Hall finished his Auburn career with 147 total tackles and 19.5 sacks.

== Professional career ==
Pre-draft measurables
Height	Weight	Arm length	Hand span	Wingspan	40-yard dash	10-yard split	20-yard split	20-yard shuttle	Three-cone drill	Vertical jump	Broad jump
6 ft 2 3/4 in (1.90 m)	254 lb (115 kg)	34 1/2 in (0.88 m)	10 in (0.25 m)	6 ft 10 5/8 in (2.10 m)	4.55 s	1.59 s	2.64 s	4.20 s	7.23 s	33.5 in (0.85 m)	10 ft 7 in (3.23 m)
All values from NFL Combine/Pro Day

Hall was selected by the Seattle Seahawks with the 37th pick in the second round of the 2023 NFL draft, a pick that they previously acquired in the trade that sent Russell Wilson to the Denver Broncos in the 2022 offseason. As a rookie, he appeared in all 17 games in the 2023 season. He finished with 38 total tackles (18 solo) and one pass defended. In Week 7 of the 2024 season, he recorded a 36-yard fumble return for a touchdown against the Falcons. In the 2024 season, he had eight sacks, 37 total tackles (20 solo), two forced fumbles, and one fumble return for a touchdown. In the 2025 season, Hall had two sacks, 30 total tackles (11 solo), and two passes defended.

Hall recorded two sacks and a forced fumble in the Seahawks' win over the New England Patriots in Super Bowl LX.

On June 2, 2026, Hall signed a three-year, $42 million contract extension with the Seahawks.

== NFL career statistics ==
Legend
	Won the Super Bowl
**Bold**	Career high

=== Regular season ===
Year	Team	Games		Tackles				Interceptions		Fumbles			
Year	Team	GP	GS	Comb	Solo	Ast	Sck	PD	Int	FF	FR	Yds	TD
2023	SEA	**17**	0	**38**	18	**20**	0.0	1	0	0	0	0	0
2024	SEA	**17**	**14**	37	**20**	17	**8.0**	0	0	**2**	**1**	**36**	**1**
2025	SEA	14	3	30	11	19	2.0	**2**	0	0	0	0	0
Career		48	17	105	49	56	10.0	3	0	2	1	36	1

=== Postseason ===
Year	Team	Games		Tackles				Interceptions		Fumbles			
Year	Team	GP	GS	Comb	Solo	Ast	Sck	PD	Int	FF	FR	Yds	TD
2025	SEA	**3**	0	**5**	**4**	**1**	**2.0**	0	0	**1**	0	0	0
Career		3	0	5	4	1	2.0	0	0	1	0	0	0
