= Nick Kallerup =

American football player (born 2001)

No. 89 – Seattle Seahawks
- Position: Tight end
- Roster status: Active

Personal information
- Born: March 27, 2001 (age 25); Wayzata, Minnesota, U.S.
- Listed height: 6 ft 5 in (1.96 m)
- Listed weight: 266 lb (121 kg)

Career information
- High school: Wayzata (Plymouth)
- College: Minnesota (2019–2024)
- NFL draft: 2025: undrafted

Career history
- Seattle Seahawks (2025–present)

Awards and highlights
- Super Bowl champion (LX)
- Stats at Pro Football Reference

Nick Kallerup (born March 27, 2001) is an American professional football tight end for the Seattle Seahawks of the National Football League (NFL). He played college football for the Minnesota Golden Gophers.

== Early life ==
Nick‘s parents are John (deceased 2017) and Kimberly Kallerup. He has two siblings, Benjamin and Kaitlyn. His father’s family is from Denmark and his father John was a first generation citizen.

Nick attended Redeemer Christian Academy in Wayzata, Minnesota through 8th grade and then attended Wayzata High School in Minnesota. Nick graduated in 2019.

== Professional career ==
Pre-draft measurables
Height	Weight	Arm length	Hand span	Wingspan	40-yard dash	10-yard split	20-yard split	20-yard shuttle	Three-cone drill	Vertical jump	Broad jump	Bench press
6 ft 4 7/8 in (1.95 m)	266 lb (121 kg)	32 1/2 in (0.83 m)	10 1/8 in (0.26 m)	6 ft 8 3/8 in (2.04 m)	4.74 s	1.67 s	2.73 s	4.57 s	7.59 s	33.5 in (0.85 m)	9 ft 4 in (2.84 m)	16 reps
All values from Pro Day

After not being selected in the 2025 NFL draft, Kallerup signed with the Seattle Seahawks as an undrafted free agent. Heading into the 2025 season, it was announced that he had made the team's 53-man roster. Nick is a Super Bowl World Champion after the Seattle Seahawks won the 2026 Super Bowl.
