= Federico Maranges =

American football player (born 2001)

No. 62 – Seattle Seahawks
- Position: Center
- Roster status: Practice squad

Personal information
- Born: October 5, 2001 (age 25); Dorado, Puerto Rico
- Listed height: 6 ft 3 in (1.91 m)
- Listed weight: 302 lb (137 kg)

Career information
- High school: Christopher Columbus (Miami-Dade County, Florida)
- College: Florida Atlantic (2019–2024)
- NFL draft: 2025: undrafted

Career history
- Seattle Seahawks (2025–present)*
- * Offseason or practice squad member only

Awards and highlights
- Super Bowl champion (LX)
- Stats at Pro Football Reference

Federico Maranges (born October 5, 2001) is a Puerto Rican professional football center for the Seattle Seahawks of the National Football League (NFL). He played college football for the Florida Atlantic Owls.

== Early life ==
Born in Dorado, Puerto Rico, Maranges moved to Miami, Florida, after Hurricane Maria. He attended Christopher Columbus High School in Miami-Dade County.

== College career ==
Maranges played college football for the Florida Atlantic Owls from 2019 to 2024. He played in 44 games for the Owls, beginning at guard, before starting 21 games in his final two seasons at center.

== Professional career ==
Pre-draft measurables
Height	Weight	Arm length	Hand span	Wingspan	40-yard dash	10-yard split	20-yard split	20-yard shuttle	Three-cone drill	Vertical jump	Broad jump	Bench press
6 ft 3 1/8 in (1.91 m)	302 lb (137 kg)	33 1/4 in (0.84 m)	10 in (0.25 m)	6 ft 7 7/8 in (2.03 m)	5.22 s	1.75 s	2.96 s	4.70 s	7.80 s	31 in (0.79 m)	8 ft 5 in (2.57 m)	28 reps
All values from Pro Day

After not being selected in the 2025 NFL draft, Maranges signed with the Seattle Seahawks as an undrafted free agent. He was released by the Seahawks on August 26, 2025, as a part of final roster cut downs. Maranges was re-signed to the team's practice squad the following day.

On February 12, 2026, Maranges signed a reserve/futures contract with Seattle. He was waived by the Seahawks on August 30 as a part of final roster cuts, and re-signed a day later to the practice squad.
