= Jalan Gaines =

American football player (born 2001)

Orlando Storm
- Position: Outside linebacker
- Roster status: Unsigned draft pick

Personal information
- Born: April 12, 2001 (age 25); Chicago, Illinois, U.S.
- Listed height: 6 ft 3 in (1.91 m)
- Listed weight: 242 lb (110 kg)

Career information
- High school: Oak Lawn Community High School (Oak Lawn, Illinois)
- College: Dubuque (2021); Illinois State (2022–2024)
- NFL draft: 2025: undrafted

Career history
- Seattle Seahawks (2025–2026)*; Orlando Storm (2027-present)
- * Offseason or practice squad member only
- Stats at Pro Football Reference

Jalan Gaines (born April 12, 2001) is an American professional football outside linebacker. He played college football for the Dubuque Spartans and Illinois State Redbirds and signed with the Seahawks as an undrafted free agent in 2025.

== Early life ==
Gaines was born in Chicago, Illinois and attended Oak Lawn Community High School in Oak Lawn, Illinois.

== College career ==
Gaines began his collegiate career at Dubuque in 2021, where he played in 10 games and had 14 solo tackles, seven assisted tackles, six tackles for loss, four sacks, and nine quarterback hurries.

He transferred to Illinois State for the 2022 season. In 2022, he appeared in three games and had two tackles and one tackle for loss. In 2023, he played in 10 games with 35 solo tackles, 27 assisted tackles, 10 tackles for loss, 5.5 sacks, five pass deflections, and two forced fumbles.

In 2024, Gaines started all 14 games and had 35 solo tackles, 15 assisted tackles, 12.5 tackles for loss, five sacks, and one forced fumble.

Over his collegiate career, Gaines played in 37 games and had 86 solo tackles, 49 assisted tackles, 29.5 tackles for loss, 14.5 sacks, five pass deflections, and three forced fumbles.

== Professional career ==
Pre-draft measurables
Height	Weight	Arm length	Hand span	Wingspan	40-yard dash	10-yard split	20-yard split	20-yard shuttle	Three-cone drill	Vertical jump	Broad jump
6 ft 3 in (1.91 m)	242 lb (110 kg)	33 1/2 in (0.85 m)	10 1/2 in (0.27 m)	6 ft 8 1/4 in (2.04 m)	4.74 s	1.70 s	2.74 s	4.45 s	7.10 s	30.5 in (0.77 m)	9 ft 8 in (2.95 m)
All values from Pro Day

Gaines signed with the Seattle Seahawks as an undrafted free agent on April 27, 2025, agreeing to a three-year, $2.96 million contract. He was waived on August 26, 2025, and subsequently signed to the Seahawks' practice squad on September 2.

On February 13, 2026, Gaines signed a one-year, $885,000 reserve/future contract with the Seahawks. On August 30, he was waived by Seattle as a part of final roster cuts.
