= Ernest Jones (linebacker) =

American football player (born 1999)

Ernest Jones IV
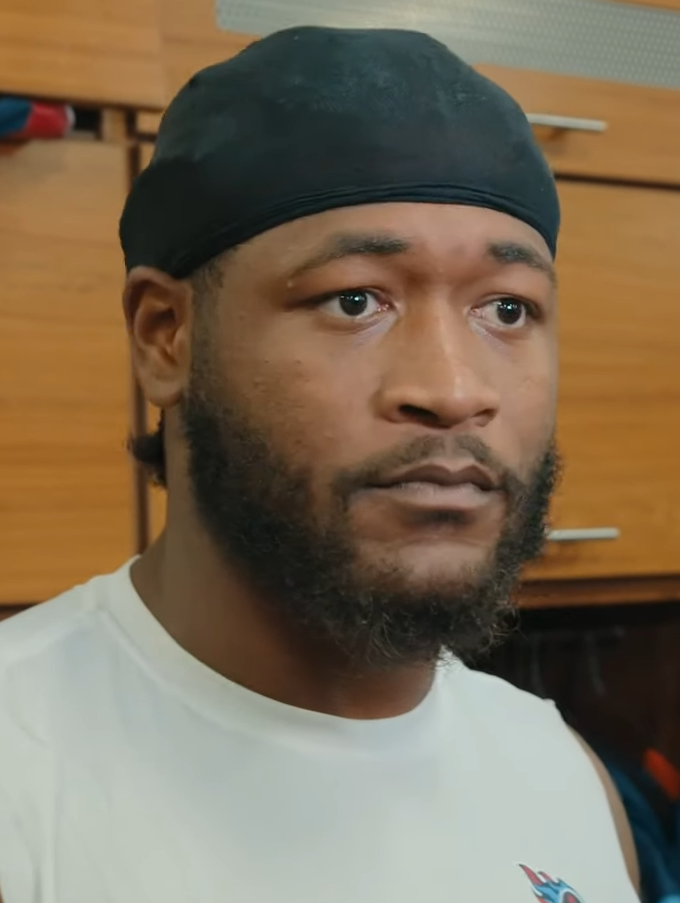
- Jones with the Tennessee Titans in 2024

No. 13 – Seattle Seahawks
- Position: Middle linebacker
- Roster status: Active

Personal information
- Born: November 22, 1999 (age 26); Waycross, Georgia, U.S.
- Listed height: 6 ft 2 in (1.88 m)
- Listed weight: 233 lb (106 kg)

Career information
- High school: Ware County (Waycross)
- College: South Carolina (2018–2020)
- NFL draft: 2021: 3rd round, 103rd overall pick

Career history
- Los Angeles Rams (2021–2023); Tennessee Titans (2024); Seattle Seahawks (2024–present)

Awards and highlights
- 2× Super Bowl champion (LVI, LX); Second-team All-Pro (2025)

Career NFL statistics as of Week 6, 2026
- Total tackles: 643
- Sacks: 9.5
- Forced fumbles: 2
- Pass deflections: 26
- Interceptions: 10
- Defensive touchdowns: 1
- Stats at Pro Football Reference

Ernest Jones IV (born November 22, 1999) is an American professional football middle linebacker for the Seattle Seahawks of the National Football League (NFL). He played college football for the South Carolina Gamecocks.

== Early life ==
Jones grew up in Waycross, Georgia and attended Ware County High School. As a senior, he recorded 112 tackles with six tackles for loss, two sacks and three forced fumbles and was named first-team Class AAAAA. Jones committed to play at South Carolina after considering offers from Georgia Tech and Duke.

== College career ==
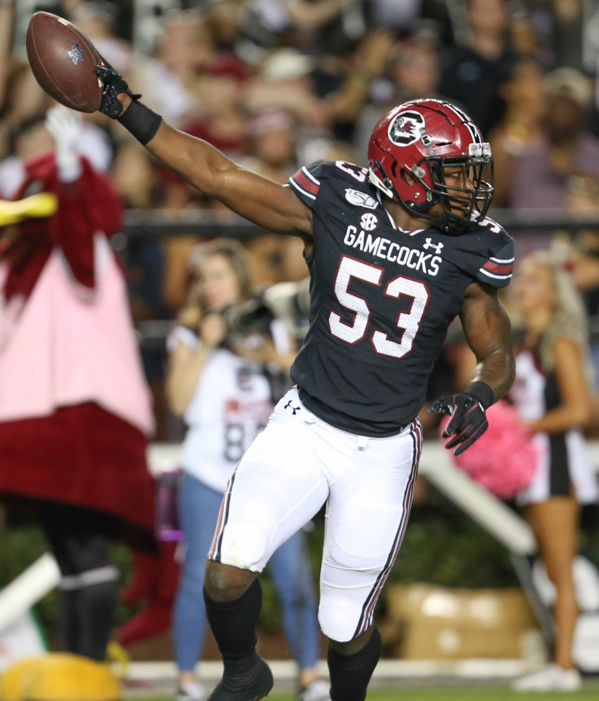
Jones with the South Carolina Gamecocks in 2019

Jones played in five games as a freshman with 16 tackles and a forced fumble. He became a starter and led South Carolina with 97 tackles in his sophomore season. Going into his junior season, Jones missed most of South Carolina's preseason training due to an appendectomy. He led the team again as a junior with 86 tackles, five of which were for a loss. At the end of the season, Jones declared that he would forgo his senior season and enter the NFL draft.

== Professional career ==
Pre-draft measurables
Height	Weight	Arm length	Hand span	Wingspan	40-yard dash	10-yard split	20-yard split	20-yard shuttle	Three-cone drill	Vertical jump	Broad jump	Bench press
6 ft 1 1/2 in (1.87 m)	230 lb (104 kg)	33 3/8 in (0.85 m)	10 3/8 in (0.26 m)	6 ft 8 1/8 in (2.04 m)	4.71 s	1.63 s	2.72 s	4.38 s	7.49 s	38.5 in (0.98 m)	10 ft 6 in (3.20 m)	19 reps
All values from Pro Day

=== Los Angeles Rams ===
Jones was selected in the third round (103rd overall) of the 2021 NFL draft by the Los Angeles Rams. He signed his four-year rookie contract with the Rams on July 22, 2021.

Jones entered his rookie year as a backup inside linebacker behind Kenny Young and Troy Reeder. He was inserted into the starting lineup after Young was traded prior to Week 8. In Week 14, Jones intercepted a pass from Kyler Murray in a 30–23 victory over the Arizona Cardinals. He suffered a high ankle sprain in Week 16 and was placed on injured reserve on December 28, finishing the regular season with 61 tackles, a sack, four pass deflections, and two interceptions through 15 games and seven starts.

Jones was activated on January 29, 2022, for the NFC Championship , contributing two tackles as he backed up Reeder in the Rams' 20–17 victory over the San Francisco 49ers. In Super Bowl LVI, Jones got the start at inside linebacker and recorded seven tackles withand ak and a pass defensed in the Rams' 23–20 victory against the Cincinnati Bengals.

During the team's voluntary minicamp in May 2022, the team announced that Jones was changing his jersey number from '50' to '53.' In the 2022 season, Jones finished with 114 tackles, two pass deflections, an interception, and arced fumble.

Jones became a full-time starter in 2023, starting 15 games while leading the team with 145 tackles.

=== Tennessee Titans ===
Prior to the 2024 season, Jones was traded to the Tennessee Titans with a 2026 sixth-round pick for a 2026 fifth-round pick. He played six games with the Titans, making 44 tackles and two pass deflections.

=== Seattle Seahawks ===
On October 23, 2024, Jones was traded to the Seattle Seahawks in exchange for Jerome Baker and a 2025 fourth-round draft pick. He played 10 games with the Seahawks as a starting linebacker, making 94 tackles, 0.5 sacks, one interception, and a forced fumble.

On March 11, 2025, Jones re-signed with the Seahawks on a three-year, $33 million contract with $15 million guaranteed. In Week 13, Jones recorded 12 tackles, two pass breakups, and two interceptions, returning one for an 85-yard touchdown, in a 26–0 victory over the Minnesota Vikings, earning NFC Defensive Player of the Week.

On February 8, 2026, Jones won Super Bowl LX with the Seahawks against the New England Patriots. He recorded 11 tackles (10 solo) in the game.

== NFL career statistics ==
Legend
	Won the Super Bowl
	Led the league
**Bold**	Career high

=== Regular season ===
Year	Team	Games		Tackles					Interceptions						Fumbles					
Year	Team	GP	GS	Comb	Solo	Ast	Sck	TFL	PD	Int	Yds	Avg	Lng	TD	FF	FR	Yds	Avg	Lng	TD
2021	LAR	15	7	61	36	25	1.0	1	4	2	50	25.0	31	0	0	0	0	0.0	0	0
2022	LAR	17	11	114	66	48	0.0	4	2	1	0	0.0	0	0	**1**	0	0	0.0	0	0
2023	LAR	15	15	**145**	**74**	**71**	**4.5**	**14**	6	0	0	0.0	0	0	0	0	0	0.0	0	0
2024	TEN	6	5	44	29	15	0.0	3	2	0	0	0.0	0	0	0	0	0	0.0	0	0
2024	SEA	10	10	94	48	46	0.5	1	2	1	12	12.0	12	0	**1**	0	0	0.0	0	0
2025	SEA	15	15	126	60	66	0.5	4	**7**	**5**	**150**	**30.0**	**85**	**1**	0	0	0	0.0	0	0
2026	SEA	6	6	59	31	28	3.0	3	3	1	20	20.0	20	0	0	0	0	0.0	0	0
Career		84	69	643	344	299	9.5	30	26	10	232	23.2	85	1	2	0	0	0.0	0	0

=== Postseason ===
Year	Team	Games		Tackles					Interceptions						Fumbles					
Year	Team	GP	GS	Comb	Solo	Ast	Sck	TFL	PD	Int	Yds	Avg	Lng	TD	FF	FR	Yds	Avg	Lng	TD
2021	LAR	2	1	9	6	3	1.0	**2**	**1**	0	–	–	–	–	0	0	–	–	–	–
2023	LAR	1	1	9	4	**5**	**2.0**	1	0	0	–	–	–	–	**1**	0	–	–	–	–
2025	SEA	3	3	**25**	**20**	**5**	0.0	1	**1**	**1**	0	0.0	0	0	**1**	0	–	–	–	–
Career		6	5	43	30	13	3.0	4	2	1	0	0.0	0	0	2	0	0	0.0	0	0

== Personal life ==
Jones is a Christian. He married his high school girlfriend, Tyra, in September 2023 and their son, Ernest Jones V, was born in July 2024.
