= Nolan Teasley =

American football executive (born 1984)

Minnesota Vikings
- Title: General manager

Personal information
- Born: 1984 (age 41–42); Federal Way, Washington, U.S.

Career information
- Position: Running back
- College: Central Washington (2002–2004)

Career history
- Seattle Seahawks (2013–2025); Intern (2013); Pro scout (2014–2016); Assistant director of pro personnel (2017); Director of pro personnel (2018–2022); Assistant general manager (2023–2025); Minnesota Vikings (2026–present) General manager

Awards and highlights
- 2× Super Bowl champion (XLVIII, LX)

Nolan Teasley is an American professional football executive who is the general manager of the Minnesota Vikings of the National Football League (NFL). He previously served with the Seattle Seahawks in various executive and scouting positions from 2013 to 2025.

== Early life ==
Born in Federal Way, Washington and a native of Ellensburg, Washington, Teasley attended and played college football at the Central Washington University as a wide receiver from 2002 to 2004.

== Executive career ==
=== Seattle Seahawks ===
In 2013, Teasley began his NFL career as an intern for the Seattle Seahawks under general manager John Schneider. That year, the Seahawks went to Super Bowl XLVIII, where they defeated the Denver Broncos by a score of 43–8. The following season, Teasley was promoted to pro scout. In 2017, he was promoted to assistant director of pro personnel.

On May 18, 2018, Teasley was promoted by the Seahawks as their director of pro personnel.

On February 16, 2023, Teasley was promoted by the Seahawks to assistant general manager.

=== Minnesota Vikings ===
On June 1, 2026, Teasley was named the general manager of the Minnesota Vikings, replacing Kwesi Adofo-Mensah.

== Personal life ==
Teasley and his wife, Morgan, have four sons together. He is of partial African American heritage through his father.
