= FedEx Air & Ground NFL Players of the Week =

Weekly NFL award

FedEx Air & Ground Players of the Week
- Awarded for: Top performances for quarterbacks and either running backs, wide receivers or tight ends in the NFL
- Presented by: FedEx

History
- First award: 2003
- Website: Official website

The following is a list of the FedEx Air & Ground NFL Players of the Week award, sponsored by FedEx. First presented in 2003, the "Air" and "Ground" categories are duly named and inspired by FedEx's cargo airline and ground transportation services, FedEx Express and FedEx Ground, respectively. Each week during the regular season, a list of nominees is developed, based on exemplary individual statistical performances from that week's games (Thursday (Note: In some seasons, including twice in 2026, the first game of the weekend was scheduled and held on Wednesday night.) through Monday night). The weekly winners are then voted on by fans via an online poll at NFL.com and the winners are typically announced on Wednesday or Thursday.

From 2003 to 2023, the "Air" category was specifically reserved for quarterbacks, and the "Ground" category was reserved for running backs, with one weekly winner designated for each category. Starting in 2024, the eligibility was updated to include wide receivers and tight ends. Since 2024, a total of six nominees are presented (sans category) – with no set number and no minimum or maximum, per position. The top two voter-getters overall are named the "Air & Ground Players of the Week". At the conclusion of the season, a list of finalists is presented, and two or three players are voted as the "Air & Ground Players of the Year".

== FedEx Air & Ground Player of the Year winners ==
Season	FedEx Air Player of the Year			FedEx Ground Player of the Year		
Season	Player	Team	Season Statistics and Notes	Player	Team	Season Statistics and Notes
2003	Peyton Manning	Indianapolis	4,267 yards, 29 TD, 10 INT, 67.0% NFL co-MVP with Steve McNair	Ahman Green	Green Bay	355 carries, 1,883 yards, 15 TD; Pro Bowl
2004	Peyton Manning	Indianapolis	4,557 yards, 49 TD, 10 INT, 67.6% NFL MVP, Offensive Player of the Year	Curtis Martin	NY Jets	371 carries, 1,697 yards, 12 TD; Pro Bowl
2005	Carson Palmer	Cincinnati	3,836 yards, 32 TD, 12 INT, 67.8% Pro Bowl	Shaun Alexander	Seattle	370 carries, 1,880 yards, 27 TD; NFL MVP, Offensive Player of the Year
2006	Drew Brees	New Orleans	4,418 yards, 26 TD, 11 INT, 64.3% Pro Bowl	LaDainian Tomlinson	San Diego	348 carries, 1,815 yards, 28 TD; NFL MVP, Offensive Player of the Year
2007	Brett Favre	Green Bay	4,155 yards, 28 TD, 15 INT, 66.5% Pro Bowl	Fred Taylor	Jacksonville	223 carries, 1,202 yards, 5 TD; Pro Bowl
2008	Drew Brees	New Orleans	5,069 yards, 34 TD, 17 INT, 65.0% Offensive Player of the Year	Adrian Peterson	Minnesota	363 carries, 1,760 yards, 10 TD; Pro Bowl
2009	Drew Brees	New Orleans	4,388 yards, 34 TD, 11 INT, 70.6% Won Super Bowl XLIV	Chris Johnson	Tennessee	358 carries, 2,006 yards, 14 TD; Offensive Player of the Year
2010	Aaron Rodgers	Green Bay	3,922 yards, 28 TD, 11 INT, 65.7% Won Super Bowl XLV	Jamaal Charles	Kansas City	230 carries, 1,467 yards, 5 TD; Pro Bowl
2011	Drew Brees	New Orleans	5,476 yards, 46 TD, 14 INT, 71.2% Offensive Player of the Year	LeSean McCoy	Philadelphia	273 carries, 1,309 yards, 17 TD; Pro Bowl
2012	Peyton Manning	Denver	4,659 yards, 37 TD, 11 INT, 68.6% Comeback Player of the Year	Adrian Peterson	Minnesota	348 carries, 2,097 yards, 12 TD; NFL MVP, Offensive Player of the Year
2013	Peyton Manning	Denver	5,477 yards, 55 TD, 10 INT, 68.3% NFL MVP, Offensive Player of the Year	LeSean McCoy	Philadelphia	314 carries, 1,607 yards, 9 TD; Pro Bowl
2014	Aaron Rodgers	Green Bay	4,381 yards, 38 TD, 5 INT, 65.6% NFL MVP	Le'Veon Bell	Pittsburgh	290 carries, 1,361 yards, 8 TD; Pro Bowl
2015	Carson Palmer	Arizona	4,671 yards, 35 TD, 11 INT, 63.7% Pro Bowl	Adrian Peterson	Minnesota	327 carries, 1,485 yards, 11 TD; Pro Bowl
2016	Matt Ryan	Atlanta	4,944 yards, 38 TD, 7 INT, 69.9% NFL MVP, Offensive Player of the Year	Ezekiel Elliott	Dallas	322 carries, 1,631 yards, 15 TD; Pro Bowl
2017	Carson Wentz	Philadelphia	3,296 yards, 33 TD, 7 INT, 60.2% Pro Bowl, won Super Bowl LII	Todd Gurley	LA Rams	279 carries, 1,305 yards, 13 TD; Offensive Player of the Year
2018	Patrick Mahomes	Kansas City	5,097 yards, 50 TD, 12 INT, 66.0% NFL MVP, Offensive Player of the Year	Saquon Barkley	NY Giants	261 carries, 1,307 yards, 11 TD; Offensive Rookie of the Year
2019	Lamar Jackson	Baltimore	3,127 yards, 36 TD, 6 INT, 66.1% NFL MVP (unanimous)	Derrick Henry	Tennessee	303 carries, 1,540 yards, 16 TD; Pro Bowl
2020	Aaron Rodgers	Green Bay	4,299 yards, 48 TD, 5 INT, 70.7% NFL MVP	Derrick Henry	Tennessee	378 carries, 2,027 yards, 17 TD; Offensive Player of the Year
2021	Tom Brady	Tampa Bay	5,316 yards, 43 TD, 12 INT, 67.5% Pro Bowl	Jonathan Taylor	Indianapolis	332 carries, 1,811 yards, 18 TD; Pro Bowl
2022	Joe Burrow	Cincinnati	4,475 passing yards, 35 TD, 12 INT, 68.3% Pro Bowl	Josh Jacobs	Las Vegas	340 carries, 1,653 yards, 12 TD; Pro Bowl
2023	Brock Purdy	San Francisco	3,864 passing yards, 31 TD, 11 INT, 69.4% Pro Bowl	Christian McCaffrey	San Francisco	272 carries, 1,459 yards, 21 TD; Pro Bowl

Season	FedEx Air and Ground Players of the Year			
Season	Player	Pos	Team	Season Statistics and Notes
2024	Josh Allen	QB	Buffalo	3,731 yards, 28 TD, 6 INT, 63.6% NFL MVP, Pro Bowl
2024	Ja'Marr Chase	WR	Cincinnati	127 receptions, 1,708 yards, 17 TD; Pro Bowl; first Wide receiver to win the award
2025	Drake Maye	QB	New England	4,394 yards, 31 TD, 8 INT, 72.0% Pro Bowl
2025	Christian McCaffrey	RB	San Francisco	311 carries, 1,202 yards, 17 TD; Comeback Player of the Year, Pro Bowl
2025	Jaxon Smith-Njigba	WR	Seattle	119 receptions, 1,793 yards, 10 TD; Offensive Player of the Year, Pro Bowl

== FedEx Air & Ground Player of the Week winners ==
=== 2003 ===
	FedEx Air Player of the Week			FedEx Ground Player of the Week		
Week	Player	Team	Key statistics	Player	Team	Key statistics
1	Joey Harrington	Detroit	17/30, 195 yards, 4 TD	Clinton Portis	Denver	24 carries, 120 yards, 2 TD
2	Drew Bledsoe	Buffalo	19/25, 314 yards, 2 TD	Jamal Lewis	Baltimore	30 carries, 295 yards, 2 TD
3	Kerry Collins	NY Giants	24/39, 276 yards, 3 TD	Ricky Williams	Miami	42 carries, 153 yards, TD
4	Peyton Manning	Indianapolis	20/25, 314 yards, 6 TD (158.3 rating)	Ahman Green	Green Bay	19 carries, 176 yards, 2 TD
5	Peyton Manning	Indianapolis	34/47, 386 yards, 2 TD, INT	Ahman Green	Green Bay	27 carries, 118 yards, 2 TD
6	Steve McNair	Tennessee	18/27, 421 yards, 3 TD	William Green	Cleveland	26 carries, 145 yards, TD
7	Aaron Brooks	New Orleans	23/30, 352 yards, 3 TD	Travis Henry	Buffalo	31 carries, 167 yards, 2 TD
8	Kerry Collins	NY Giants	23/39, 375 yards, 2 TD, INT	Stephen Davis	Carolina	31 carries, 178 yards, 2 TD
9	Tom Brady	New England	20/35, 350 yards, 3 TD, INT	Ahman Green	Green Bay	21 carries, 137 yards
10	Doug Flutie	San Diego	21/29, 248 yards, 2 TD	LaDainian Tomlinson	San Diego	16 carries, 162 yards, 2 TD
11	Kelly Holcomb	Cleveland	29/35, 392 yards, 3 TD	Deuce McAllister	New Orleans	28 carries, 173 yards, 2 TD
12	Matt Hasselbeck	Seattle	23/41, 333 yards, 5 TD	Deuce McAllister	New Orleans	19 carries, 184 yards, 2 TD
13	Matt Hasselbeck	Seattle	26/35, 328 yards, 3 TD, INT	Clinton Portis	Denver	34 carries, 170 yards, 2 TD
14	Jeff Garcia	San Francisco	19/28, 252 yards, 4 TD	Clinton Portis	Denver	22 carries, 218 yards, 5 TD
15	Aaron Brooks	New Orleans	26/35, 296 yards, 5 TD	Rudi Johnson	Cincinnati	21 carries, 174 yards, 2 TD
16	Brett Favre	Green Bay	22/30, 399 yards, 4 TD	Jamal Lewis	Baltimore	22 carries, 205 yards, 2 TD
17	Tom Brady	New England	21/32, 204 yards, 4 TD	Ahman Green	Green Bay	20 carries, 218 yards, 2 TD
POY	Peyton Manning	Indianapolis	4,267 yards, 29 TD, 10 INT	Ahman Green	Green Bay	355 carries, 1,883 yards, 15 TD

=== 2004 ===
	FedEx Air Player of the Week			FedEx Ground Player of the Week		
Week	Player	Team	Key statistics	Player	Team	Key statistics
1	Donovan McNabb	Philadelphia	26/36, 330 yards, 4 TD	Curtis Martin	NY Jets	29 carries, 196 yards, TD
2	Aaron Brooks	New Orleans	25/34, 279 yards, 3 TD	DeShaun Foster	Carolina	32 carries, 174 yards, TD
3	Peyton Manning	Indianapolis	28/40, 393 yards, 5 TD	Jamal Lewis	Baltimore	18 carries, 186 yards, TD
4	Byron Leftwich	Jacksonville	29/41, 318 yards, TD	Tiki Barber	NY Giants	23 carries, 182 yards, TD
5	Daunte Culpepper	Minnesota	36/50, 396 yards, 5 TD	Chris Brown	Tennessee	27 carries, 148 yards, 2 TD
6	Daunte Culpepper	Minnesota	26/37, 425 yards, 5 TD, 2 INT	Reuben Droughns	Denver	38 carries, 176 yards, TD
7	Donovan McNabb	Philadelphia	28/43, 376 yards, 4 TD, INT	Rudi Johnson	Cincinnati	24 carries, 119 yards, TD
8	Drew Brees	San Diego	22/25, 281 yards, 5 TD	Priest Holmes	Kansas City	32 carries, 143 yards, 3 TD
9	Drew Brees	San Diego	22/36, 257 yards, 4 TD	Jerome Bettis	Pittsburgh	33 carries, 149 yards
10	Brett Favre	Green Bay	20/29, 236 yards, 4 TD	Derrick Blaylock	Kansas City	33 carries, 186 yards, TD
11	Donovan McNabb	Philadelphia	18/26, 222 yards, 4 TD, INT	Edgerrin James	Indianapolis	23 carries, 204 yards, TD
12	Peyton Manning	Indianapolis	23/28, 236 yards, 6 TD	Rudi Johnson	Cincinnati	26 carries, 202 yards, 2 TD
13	Carson Palmer	Cincinnati	29/36, 382 yards, 3 TD, INT	Julius Jones	Dallas	30 carries, 198 yards, 3 TD
14	Billy Volek	Tennessee	29/43, 426 yards, 4 TD	LaDainian Tomlinson	San Diego	25 carries, 131 yards, TD
15	Kerry Collins	Oakland	21/37, 371 yards, 5 TD, INT	Fred Taylor	Jacksonville	22 carries, 165 yards, TD
16	Brett Favre	Green Bay	30/43, 365 yards, 3 TD, INT	Shaun Alexander	Seattle	30 carries, 154 yards, 3 TD
17	Marc Bulger	St. Louis	29/39, 450 yards, 3 TD, 2 INT	Deuce McAllister	New Orleans	28 carries, 140 yards, TD
POY	Peyton Manning	Indianapolis	4,557 yards, 49 TD, 10 INT	Curtis Martin	NY Jets	371 carries, 1,697 yards, 12 TD

- Week 13: Julius Jones became the first rookie named the Ground Player of the Week.
- Week 15: Kerry Collins became first player to be named Air Player of Week for two different teams

=== 2005 ===
	FedEx Air Player of the Week			FedEx Ground Player of the Week		
Week	Player	Team	Key statistics	Player	Team	Key statistics
1	Drew Bledsoe	Dallas	18/24, 226 yards, 3 TD	Willie Parker	Pittsburgh	22 carries, 161 yards, TD
2	Carson Palmer	Cincinnati	27/40, 337 yards, 3 TD, INT	Thomas Jones	Detroit	20 carries, 139 yards, 2 TD
3	Donovan McNabb	Philadelphia	30/52, 365 yards, 2 TD, INT	LaDainian Tomlinson	San Diego	21 carries, 192 yards, 3 TD
4	Eli Manning	NY Giants	24/41, 352 yards, 2 TD	LaDainian Tomlinson	San Diego	25 carries, 134 yards, 2 TD
5	Brett Favre	Green Bay	19/27, 215 yards, 3 TD	Tatum Bell	Denver	12 carries, 127 yards, 2 TD
6	Carson Palmer	Cincinnati	27/33, 272 yards, 2 TD	LaDainian Tomlinson	San Diego	31 carries, 140 yards, TD
7	Brett Favre	Green Bay	28/36, 315 yards, 2 TD	LaMont Jordan	Oakland	28 carries, 122 yards, 3 TD
8	Jake Plummer	Denver	22/35, 309 yards, 4 TD	Tiki Barber	NY Giants	24 carries, 206 yards, TD
9	Carson Palmer	Cincinnati	19/26, 248 yards, 2 TD	LaDainian Tomlinson	San Diego	25 carries, 107 yards, 3 TD
10	Chris Simms	Tampa Bay	15/29, 279 yards, 3 TD	Shaun Alexander	Seattle	33 carries, 165 yards, 3 TD
11	Drew Brees	San Diego	28/33, 339 yards, 4 TD	Reuben Droughns	Cleveland	30 carries, 166 yards, TD
12	Carson Palmer	Cincinnati	22/30, 302 yards, 3 TD, INT	LaDainian Tomlinson	San Diego	25 carries, 184 yards, 3 TD
13	Carson Palmer	Cincinnati	22/38, 227 yards, 3 TD	Larry Johnson	Kansas City	30 carries, 140 yards, 2 TD
14	Drew Bledsoe	Dallas	22/34, 332 yards, 3 TD	Jerome Bettis	Pittsburgh	17 carries, 101 yards, 2 TD
15	Matt Hasselbeck	Seattle	21/27, 285 yards, 3 TD	Tiki Barber	NY Giants	29 carries, 220 yards, 2 TD
16	Kyle Boller	Baltimore	24/34, 289 yards, 3 TD, INT	Julius Jones	Dallas	34 carries, 194 yards, 2 TD
17	Trent Green	Kansas City	23/29, 344 yards, TD	Larry Johnson	Kansas City	26 carries, 201 yards, 3 TD
POY	Carson Palmer	Cincinnati	3,836 yards, 32 TD, 12 INT	Shaun Alexander	Seattle	370 carries, 1,880 yards, 27 TD

- Week 11: Reuben Droughns became the first player to be Ground Player of the Week for two different teams.
- Week 12: LaDainian Tomlinson became the first player to be named Ground Player of the Week five times in a single season.
- Week 13: Carson Palmer became the first player to be named Air Player of the Week five times in a single season.

=== 2006 ===
	FedEx Air Player of the Week			FedEx Ground Player of the Week		
Week	Player	Team	Key statistics	Player	Team	Key statistics
1	Donovan McNabb	Philadelphia	24/35, 314 yards, 3 TD, INT	LaDainian Tomlinson	San Diego	31 carries, 131 yards, TD
2	Rex Grossman	Chicago	20/27, 289 yards, 4 TD	Rudi Johnson	Cincinnati	26 carries, 145 yards, 2 TD
3	Brett Favre	Green Bay	25/36, 340 yards, 3 TD	Brian Westbrook	Philadelphia	8 carries, 117 yards, 2 TD
4	Rex Grossman	Chicago	17/31, 232 yards, 2 TD	Laurence Maroney	New England	15 carries, 125 yards, 2 TD
5	Donovan McNabb	Philadelphia	18/33, 354 yards, 2 TD	Deuce McAllister	New Orleans	15 carries, 123 yards, TD
6	Philip Rivers	San Diego	29/39, 334 yards, 2 TD	LaDainian Tomlinson	San Diego	21 carries, 71 yards, 4 TD
7	Michael Vick	Atlanta	18/30, 232 yards, 4 TD, 2 INT	Chester Taylor	Minnesota	26 carries, 169 yards, TD
8	Tom Brady	New England	29/43, 372 yards, 4 TD, INT	Ahman Green	Green Bay	21 carries, 106 yards, 2 TD
9	Drew Brees	New Orleans	24/32, 314 yards, 3 TD	LaDainian Tomlinson	San Diego	18 carries, 172 yards, 3 TD
10	Brett Favre	Green Bay	24/42, 347 yards, 2 TD	LaDainian Tomlinson	San Diego	22 carries, 104 yards, 4 TD
11	Carson Palmer	Cincinnati	14/22, 275 yards, 3 TD, INT	LaDainian Tomlinson	San Diego	20 carries, 105 yards, 3 TD
12	Drew Brees	New Orleans	21/30, 349 yards, 2 TD	Joseph Addai	Indianapolis	24 carries, 171 yards, 4 TD
13	Carson Palmer	Cincinnati	21/32, 234 yards, TD	LaDainian Tomlinson	San Diego	28 carries, 178 yards, 2 TD
14	Drew Brees	New Orleans	26/38, 384 yards, 5 TD	LaDainian Tomlinson	San Diego	28 carries, 103 yards, 3 TD
15	Rex Grossman	Chicago	29/44, 339 yards, 2 TD	LaDainian Tomlinson	San Diego	25 carries, 199 yards, 2 TD
16	Jeff Garcia	Philadelphia	15/23, 238 yards, TD, INT	Ron Dayne	Houston	32 carries, 153 yards, 2 TD
17	Brett Favre	Green Bay	21/42, 285 yards, TD, INT	Tiki Barber	NY Giants	23 carries, 234 yards, 3 TD
POY	Drew Brees	New Orleans	4,418 yards, 26 TD, 11 INT	LaDainian Tomlinson	San Diego	348 carries, 1,815 yards, 28 TD

- Week 14: LaDainian Tomlinson broke the single-season touchdown record (29) in this game.
- Week 15: LaDainian Tomlinson became the first player to be named Ground Player eight times in a single season.
- Week 17: This was the final regular season game of Tiki Barber's career.

=== 2007 ===
	FedEx Air Player of the Week			FedEx Ground Player of the Week		
Week	Player	Team	Key statistics	Player	Team	Key statistics
1	Tony Romo	Dallas	15/24, 345 yards, 4 TD, INT	Chris Brown	Tennessee	19 carries, 175 yards
2	Derek Anderson	Cleveland	20/33, 328 yards, 5 TD, INT	Jamal Lewis	Cleveland	27 carries, 216 yards, TD
3	Brett Favre	Green Bay	28/45, 369 yards, 3 TD	Brian Westbrook	Philadelphia	14 carries, 110 yards, 2 TD
4	Brett Favre	Green Bay	32/45, 344 yards, 2 TD	Justin Fargas	Oakland	22 carries, 179 yards
5	Philip Rivers	San Diego	13/18, 270 yards, 2 TD	Michael Turner	San Diego	10 carries, 147 yards, TD
6	Tom Brady	New England	31/46, 388 yards, 5 TD	Maurice Jones-Drew	Jacksonville	12 carries, 125 yards, 2 TD
7	Tom Brady	New England	21/25, 354 yards, 6 TD (158.3 rating)	Kenny Watson	Cincinnati	31 carries, 130 yards, 3 TD
8	Brett Favre	Green Bay	21/27, 331 yards, 2 TD	Willie Parker	Pittsburgh	22 carries, 126 yards, TD
9	Ben Roethlisberger	Pittsburgh	13/16, 209 yards, 5 TD (158.3 rating)	Adrian Peterson	Minnesota	30 carries, 296 yards, 3 TD
10	Brett Favre	Green Bay	33/46, 351 yards, 3 TD	Ryan Grant	Green Bay	25 carries, 119 yards, TD
11	Tom Brady	New England	31/39, 373 yards, 5 TD	Chester Taylor	Minnesota	22 carries, 164 yards, 3 TD
12	Brett Favre	Green Bay	31/41, 381 yards, 3 TD	Frank Gore	San Francisco	21 carries, 116 yards, 2 TD
13	Tony Romo	Dallas	19/30, 309 yards, 4 TD, INT	LaDainian Tomlinson	San Diego	23 carries, 177 yards, 2 TD
14	Matt Hasselbeck	Seattle	22/33, 272 yards, 4 TD	Ryan Grant	Green Bay	29 carries, 156 yards, TD
15	David Garrard	Jacksonville	17/33, 197 yards, 3 TD, INT	Fred Taylor	Jacksonville	25 carries, 147 yards, TD
16	Ben Roethlisberger	Pittsburgh	16/20, 261 yards, 3 TD (158.3 rating)	Brandon Jacobs	NY Giants	25 carries, 143 yards, 2 TD
17	Tom Brady	New England	32/42, 356 yards, 2 TD	Clinton Portis	Washington	25 carries, 104 yards, 2 TD
POY	Brett Favre	Green Bay	4,155 yards, 28 TD, 15 INT	Fred Taylor	Jacksonville	223 carries, 1,202 yards, 5 TD

- Week 9: Adrian Peterson set the NFL record and "Ground Player of the Week" record for most rushing yards in a single game (296).
- Week 17: Tom Brady set the single-season touchdown record (50). New England finished 16–0 in the regular season.

=== 2008 ===
	FedEx Air Player of the Week			FedEx Ground Player of the Week		
Week	Player	Team	Key statistics	Player	Team	Key statistics
1	Donovan McNabb	Philadelphia	21/33, 361 yards, 3 TD	Michael Turner	Atlanta	22 carries, 220 yards, 2 TD
2	Aaron Rodgers	Green Bay	24/38, 328 yards, 3 TD	Darren McFadden	Oakland	21 carries, 164 yards, TD
3	Philip Rivers	San Diego	19/25, 250 yards, 3 TD	Ronnie Brown	Miami	17 carries, 113 yards, 4 TD, TD pass
4	Brett Favre	NY Jets	24/34, 289 yards, 6 TD	Larry Johnson	Kansas City	28 carries, 198 yards, 2 TD
5	Ben Roethlisberger	Pittsburgh	26/41, 309 yards, 3 TD	Clinton Portis	Washington	29 carries, 149 yards, TD
6	Philip Rivers	San Diego	18/27, 306 yards, 3 TD	Maurice Jones-Drew	Jacksonville	22 carries, 125 yards, 2 TD
7	Trent Edwards	Buffalo	25/30, 261 yards, TD	Clinton Portis	Washington	27 carries, 175 yards, TD
8	Drew Brees	New Orleans	30/41, 339 yards, 3 TD	Clinton Portis	Washington	24 carries, 126 yards
9	Kurt Warner	Arizona	23/34, 342 yards, 2 TD	Adrian Peterson	Minnesota	25 carries, 139 yards, TD
10	Jay Cutler	Denver	24/42, 447 yards, 3 TD	Adrian Peterson	Minnesota	30 carries, 192 yards, TD
11	Kurt Warner	Arizona	32/44, 395 yards, TD	Ryan Grant	Green Bay	25 carries, 145 yards, TD
12	Drew Brees	New Orleans	20/26, 323 yards, 4 TD	Michael Turner	Atlanta	24 carries, 117 yards, 4 TD
13	Jay Cutler	Denver	27/43, 357 yards, 2 TD	Peyton Hillis	Denver	22 carries, 129 yards, TD
14	Jay Cutler	Denver	32/40, 286 yards, 2 TD	DeAngelo Williams	Carolina	19 carries, 186 yards, 2 TD
15	Tarvaris Jackson	Minnesota	11/17, 163 yards, 4 TD	Adrian Peterson	Minnesota	28 carries, 165 yards
16	Peyton Manning	Indianapolis	29/34, 364 yards, 3 TD	Derrick Ward	NY Giants	15 carries, 215 yards
17	Chad Pennington	Miami	22/30, 200 yards, 2 TD	LaDainian Tomlinson	San Diego	14 carries, 96 yards, 3 TD
POY	Drew Brees	New Orleans	5,069 yards, 34 TD, 17 INT	Adrian Peterson	Minnesota	363 carries, 1,760 yards, 10 TD

=== 2009 ===
	FedEx Air Player of the Week			FedEx Ground Player of the Week		
Week	Player	Team	Key statistics	Player	Team	Key statistics
1	Drew Brees	New Orleans	26/34, 358 yards, 6 TD, 1 INT	Adrian Peterson	Minnesota	25 carries, 180 yards, 3 TD
2	Drew Brees	New Orleans	25/34, 311 yards, 3 TD, INT	Frank Gore	San Francisco	16 carries, 207 yards, 2 TD
3	Peyton Manning	Indianapolis	24/35, 379 yards, 4 TD, INT	Maurice Jones-Drew	Jacksonville	23 carries, 119 yards, 3 TD
4	Brett Favre	Minnesota	24/31, 271 yards, 3 TD	Rashard Mendenhall	Pittsburgh	29 carries, 165 yards, 2 TD
5	Peyton Manning	Indianapolis	36/44, 309 yards, 3 TD, INT	Cedric Benson	Cincinnati	27 carries, 120 yards, TD
6	Drew Brees	New Orleans	23/30, 369 yards, 4 TD	Thomas Jones	NY Jets	22 carries, 210 yards, TD
7	Carson Palmer	Cincinnati	20/24, 233 yards, 5 TD	Cedric Benson	Cincinnati	37 carries, 189 yards, TD
8	Brett Favre	Minnesota	17/28, 244 yards, 4 TD	Chris Johnson	Tennessee	24 carries, 228 yards, 2 TD
9	Kurt Warner	Arizona	22/32, 261 yards, 5 TD	Michael Turner	Atlanta	18 carries, 166 yards, 2 TD
10	Brett Favre	Minnesota	20/29, 344 yards, TD	Adrian Peterson	Minnesota	18 carries, 133 yards, 2 TD
11	Brett Favre	Minnesota	22/25, 213 yards, 4 TD	Ricky Williams	Miami	22 carries, 119 yards, 2 TD
12	Drew Brees	New Orleans	18/23, 371 yards, 5 TD (158.3 rating)	Chris Johnson	Tennessee	18 carries, 154 yards, TD
13	Kurt Warner	Arizona	22/32, 285 yards, 3 TD	Correll Buckhalter	Denver	12 carries, 113 yards
14	Drew Brees	New Orleans	31/40, 296 yards, 3 TD	Ray Rice	Baltimore	13 carries, 166 yards, TD
15	Ben Roethlisberger	Pittsburgh	29/46, 503 yards, 3 TD	Jerome Harrison	Cleveland	34 carries, 286 yards, 3 TD
16	Jay Cutler	Chicago	20/35, 273 yards, 4 TD, INT	Jonathan Stewart	Carolina	28 carries, 206 yards, TD
17	Brett Favre	Minnesota	25/31, 316 yards, 4 TD	Jamaal Charles	Kansas City	25 carries, 259 yards, 2 TD
POY	Drew Brees	New Orleans	4,388 yards, 34 TD, 11 INT	Chris Johnson	Tennessee	358 carries, 2,006 yards, 14 TD

- Week 4: Brett Favre became the first quarterback to defeat all 32 NFL teams; first player to be named Air Player of the Week for three different teams.
- 2009 was the first season in which there were no first-time winners of the Air Player of the Week award since its inception in 2003.

=== 2010 ===
	FedEx Air Player of the Week			FedEx Ground Player of the Week		
Week	Player	Team	Key statistics	Player	Team	Key statistics
1	Jay Cutler	Chicago	23/35, 372 yards, 2 TD	Arian Foster	Houston	33 carries, 231 yards, 3 TD
2	Matt Schaub	Houston	497 yards, 3 TD	LeSean McCoy	Philadelphia	16 carries, 120 yards, TD
3	Michael Vick	Philadelphia	17/31, 291 yards, 3 TD	Adrian Peterson	Minnesota	23 carries, 160 yards, 2 TD
4	Kyle Orton	Denver	341 yards, 2 TD, INT	LaDainian Tomlinson	NY Jets	133 yards, 2 TD
5	Shaun Hill	Detroit	21/32, 227 yards, 3 TD	Matt Forte	Chicago	22 carries, 166 yards, 2 TD
6	Kevin Kolb	Philadelphia	23/29, 326 yards, 3 TD, INT	Chris Ivory	New Orleans	15 carries, 158 yards
7	Matt Ryan	Atlanta	24/33, 299 yards, 3 TD, INT	Darren McFadden	Oakland	16 carries, 165 yards, 3 TD
8	Jason Campbell	Oakland	15/27, 310 yards, 2 TD	Jamaal Charles	Kansas City	22 carries, 177 yards
9	Brett Favre	Minnesota	36/47, 446 yards, 2 TD, 2 INT	Peyton Hillis	Cleveland	29 carries, 184 yards, 2 TD
10	Michael Vick	Philadelphia	333 yards, 4 TD	Fred Jackson	Detroit	25 carries, 133 yards, TD
11	Aaron Rodgers	Green Bay	22/31, 301 yards, 4 TD	Maurice Jones-Drew	Jacksonville	23 carries, 133 yards, TD
12	Matt Cassel	Kansas City	22/32, 233 yards, 4 TD	Peyton Hillis	Cleveland	26 carries, 131 yards, 3 TD
13	Aaron Rodgers	Green Bay	21/30, 298 yards, 3 TD	Maurice Jones-Drew	Jacksonville	31 carries, 186 yards
14	Tom Brady	New England	27/40, 369 yards, 2 TD	Darren McFadden	Oakland	16 carries, 123 yards, 2 TD (3 receptions, 86 yards, TD)
15	Michael Vick	Philadelphia	21/35, 242 yards, 3 TD, INT	Ray Rice	Baltimore	31 carries, 153 yards, TD (5 receptions, 80 yards, TD)
16	Josh Freeman	Tampa Bay	21/26, 237 yards, 5 TD	LeGarrette Blount	Tampa Bay	18 carries, 164 yards
17	Josh Freeman	Tampa Bay	21/26, 255 yards, 2 TD	Arian Foster	Houston	31 carries, 180 yards, 2 TD
POY	Aaron Rodgers	Green Bay	3,922 yards, 28 TD, 11 INT	Jamaal Charles	Kansas City	230 carries, 1,467 yards, 5 TD

- Week 4: LaDainian Tomlinson won his 18th and final Ground Player of the Week award.
- Week 9: Brett Favre threw for a career-high 446 yards; 20th and final career Air Player of the Week award.
- Week 15: Miracle at the New Meadowlands

=== 2011 ===
	FedEx Air Player of the Week			FedEx Ground Player of the Week		
Week	Player	Team	Key statistics	Player	Team	Key statistics
1	Tom Brady	New England	32/48, 517 yards, 4 TD, INT	LeSean McCoy	Philadelphia	15 carries, 122 yards, TD (2 receptions, 15 yards, TD)
2	Matthew Stafford	Detroit	23/39, 294 yards, 4 TD, INT	Fred Jackson	Buffalo	15 carries, 117 yards, 2 TD
3	Joe Flacco	Baltimore	27/48, 389 yards, 3 TD	Darren McFadden	Oakland	19 carries, 171 yards, 2 TD
4	Aaron Rodgers	Green Bay	29/38, 408 yards, 4 TD, INT	Matt Forte	Chicago	25 carries, 205 yards, TD
5	Aaron Rodgers	Green Bay	26/39, 396 yards, 2 TD	Adrian Peterson	Minnesota	29 carries, 122 yards, 3 TD
6	Aaron Rodgers	Green Bay	18/29, 316 yards, 3 TD, INT	Frank Gore	San Francisco	15 carries, 141 yards, TD
7	Aaron Rodgers	Green Bay	24/30, 335 yards, 3 TD	DeMarco Murray	Dallas	25 carries, 253 yards, TD
8	Ben Roethlisberger	Pittsburgh	36/50, 365 yards, 2 TD, INT	LeSean McCoy	Philadelphia	30 carries, 185 yards, 2 TD
9	Aaron Rodgers	Green Bay	21/26, 247 yards, 4 TD	Willis McGahee	Denver	20 carries, 163 yards, 2 TD
10	Tony Romo	Dallas	23/26, 270 yards, 3 TD	Michael Bush	Oakland	30 carries, 157 yards, TD
11	Matthew Stafford	Detroit	28/36, 336 yards, 5 TD, 2 INT	Kevin Smith	Detroit	16 carries, 140 yards, 2 TD
12	Drew Brees	New Orleans	24/38, 363 yards, 4 TD	Beanie Wells	Arizona	27 carries, 228 yards, TD
13	Aaron Rodgers	Green Bay	28/46, 369 yards, 4 TD, INT	Ray Rice	Baltimore	29 carries, 204 yards, TD
14	Matt Ryan	Atlanta	22/38, 320 yards, 4 TD	Marshawn Lynch	Seattle	23 carries, 115 yards, TD
15	Drew Brees	New Orleans	32/40, 412 yards, 5 TD	Reggie Bush	Miami	25 carries, 203 yards, TD
16	Drew Brees	New Orleans	23/39, 307 yards, 4 TD, 2 INT	C. J. Spiller	Buffalo	16 carries, 111 yards, TD
17	Matt Flynn	Green Bay	31/44, 480 yards, 6 TD, INT	Ray Rice	Baltimore	24 carries, 191 yards and 2 TD
POY	Drew Brees	New Orleans	5,476 yards, 46 TD, 14 INT	LeSean McCoy	Philadelphia	273 carries, 1,309 yards, 17 TD

- Weeks 4–7: Aaron Rodgers becomes the first quarterback to win four consecutive weeks.
- Aaron Rodgers becomes the first quarterback to win Air award six times in a single season.

=== 2012 ===
	FedEx Air Player of the Week			FedEx Ground Player of the Week		
Week	Player	Team	Key statistics	Player	Team	Key statistics
1	Robert Griffin III	Washington	19/26, 320 yards, 2 TD	C. J. Spiller	Buffalo	14 carries, 169 yards, TD
2	Eli Manning	NY Giants	31/51, 510 yards, 3 TD, 3 INT	Reggie Bush	Miami	26 carries, 172 yards, 2 TD
3	Joe Flacco	Baltimore	28/39, 382 yards, 3 TD, INT	Jamaal Charles	Kansas City	33 carries, 233 yards, TD
4	Tom Brady	New England	22/36, 340 yards, 3 TD	Brandon Bolden	New England	16 carries, 137 yards, TD
5	Alex Smith	San Francisco	18/24, 303 yards, 3 TD	Ahmad Bradshaw	NY Giants	30 carries, 200 yards, TD
6	Aaron Rodgers	Green Bay	24/37, 338 yards, 6 TD	Shonn Greene	NY Jets	32 carries, 161 yards, 3 TD
7	Drew Brees	New Orleans	27/37, 377 yards, 4 TD, INT	Chris Johnson	Tennessee	18 carries, 195 yards, 2 TD
8	Tom Brady	New England	23/35, 304 yards, 4 TD	Doug Martin	Tampa Bay	29 carries, 135 yards, TD
9	Andrew Luck	Indianapolis	30/48, 433 yards, 2 TD	Doug Martin	Tampa Bay	251 yards, 4 TD
10	Joe Flacco	Baltimore	21/33, 341 yards, 3 TD, INT	Adrian Peterson	Minnesota	27 carries, 171 yards, TD
11	Matt Schaub	Houston	43/55, 527 yards, 5 TD, 2 INT	Doug Martin	Tampa Bay	24 carries, 138 yards
12	Robert Griffin III	Washington	19/27, 304 yards, 4 TD, INT	Arian Foster	Houston	20 carries, 102 yards, 2 TD
13	Russell Wilson	Seattle	23/37, 293 yards, 2 TD	Adrian Peterson	Minnesota	21 carries, 210 yards, TD
14	Tom Brady	New England	21/35, 296 yards, 4 TD	Adrian Peterson	Minnesota	31 carries, 154 yards, 2 TD
15	Matt Ryan	Atlanta	23/28, 270 yards, 3 TD	Knowshon Moreno	Denver	21 carries, 115 yards, TD
16	Aaron Rodgers	Green Bay	27/38, 342 yards, 3 TD	Jamaal Charles	Kansas City	22 carries, 226 yards, TD
17	Peyton Manning	Denver	23/29, 304 yards, 3 TD	Alfred Morris	Washington	33 carries, 200 yards, 3 TD
POY	Peyton Manning	Denver	4,659 yards, 37 TD, 11 INT	Adrian Peterson	Minnesota	348 carries, 2,097 yards, 12 TD

- Week 1: Robert Griffin III became the first rookie and the first player in his debut game, to be named Air Player of the Week.
- Week 11: Matt Schaub throws for "Air Player of the Week" record of 527 passing yards.
- Week 9: Andrew Luck set a single-game record for most passing yards by a rookie (433).

=== 2013 ===
	FedEx Air Player of the Week			FedEx Ground Player of the Week		
Week	Player	Team	Key statistics	Player	Team	Key statistics
1	Peyton Manning	Denver	27/42, 462 yards, 7 TD	LeSean McCoy	Philadelphia	31 carries, 184 yards, TD
2	Aaron Rodgers	Green Bay	34/42, 480 yards, 4 TD	James Starks	Green Bay	20 carries, 132 yards, TD
3	Peyton Manning	Denver	32/37, 374 yards, 3 TD	DeMarco Murray	Dallas	26 carries, 175 yards, TD
4	Drew Brees	New Orleans	30/39, 413 yards, 4 TD	Adrian Peterson	Minnesota	23 carries, 140 yards, 2 TD
5	Tony Romo	Dallas	25/36, 506 yards, 5 TD, INT	Jamaal Charles	Kansas City	22 carries, 108 yards, TD
6	Nick Foles	Philadelphia	22/31, 296 yards, 3 TD	Eddie Lacy	Green Bay	23 carries, 120 yards
7	Matt Ryan	Atlanta	20/26, 273 yards, 3 TD	Chris Ivory	NY Jets	34 carries, 104 yards
8	Drew Brees	New Orleans	26/34, 332 yards, 5 TD	Andre Ellington	Arizona	15 carries, 154 yards, TD
9	Nick Foles	Philadelphia	22/28, 406 yards, 7 TD	Chris Johnson	Tennessee	23 carries, 150 yards, 2 TD
10	Drew Brees	New Orleans	34/41, 392 yards, 4 TD	Mark Ingram	New Orleans	14 carries, 145 yards, TD
11	Ben Roethlisberger	Pittsburgh	29/45, 367 yards, 4 TD	Bobby Rainey	Tampa Bay	30 carries, 163 yards, 2 TD
12	Philip Rivers	San Diego	27/39, 392 yards, 3 TD	Adrian Peterson	Minnesota	32 carries, 146 yards, TD
13	Peyton Manning	Denver	22/35, 403 yards, 5 TD, 2 INT	Adrian Peterson	Minnesota	35 carries, 211 yards
14	Drew Brees	New Orleans	30/42, 313 yards, 4 TD	LeSean McCoy	Philadelphia	29 carries, 217 yards, 2 TD
15	Matt Cassel	Minnesota	26/35, 382 yards, 2 TD, INT	Eddie Lacy	Green Bay	21 carries, 141 yards, TD
16	Peyton Manning	Denver	32/51, 400 yards, 4 TD	LeSean McCoy	Philadelphia	18 carries, 133 yards, 2 TD
17	Drew Brees	New Orleans	24/31, 381 yards, 4 TD	LeGarrette Blount	New England	24 carries, 189 yards, 2 TD
POY	Peyton Manning	Denver	5,477 yards, 55 TD, 10 INT	LeSean McCoy	Philadelphia	314 carries, 1,607 yards, 9 TD

- Week 1: Peyton Manning tied the NFL record, and became the first "Air" player of the week to throw seven touchdown passes in a single game.
- Week 9: Nick Foles tied the NFL record, and became the second "Air" player of the week to throw seven touchdown passes in a single game.
- Week 14: Drew Brees was named the Air Player of the Week for a record 21st time.
- Week 16: Peyton Manning threw his 51st TD of the season, breaking the single-season touchdown record.

=== 2014 ===
	FedEx Air Player of the Week			FedEx Ground Player of the Week		
Week	Player	Team	Key statistics	Player	Team	Key statistics
1	Matt Ryan	Atlanta	31/43, 448 yards, 3 TD	Knowshon Moreno	Miami	24 carries, 134 yards, TD
2	Philip Rivers	San Diego	28/37, 284 yards, 3 TD	DeMarco Murray	Dallas	29 carries, 167 yards, TD
3	Kirk Cousins	Washington	30/48, 427 yards, 3 TD, INT	Le'Veon Bell	Pittsburgh	21 carries, 147 yards
4	Philip Rivers	San Diego	29/39, 377 yards, 3 TD	DeMarco Murray	Dallas	24 carries, 149 yards, 2 TD
5	Peyton Manning	Denver	31/47, 479 yards, 4 TD, 2 INT	DeMarco Murray	Dallas	31 carries, 136 yards
6	Joe Flacco	Baltimore	21/28, 306 yards, 5 TD	DeMarco Murray	Dallas	29 carries, 115 yards, TD
7	Peyton Manning	Denver	22/26, 318 yards, 4 TD	DeMarco Murray	Dallas	28 carries, 128 yards, TD
8	Ben Roethlisberger	Pittsburgh	40/49, 522 yards, 6 TD	Mark Ingram II	New Orleans	24 carries, 172 yards, TD
9	Ben Roethlisberger	Pittsburgh	25/37, 340 yards, 6 TD	Jeremy Hill	Cincinnati	24 carries, 154 yards, 2 TD
10	Aaron Rodgers	Green Bay	18/27, 315 yards, 6 TDs	Marshawn Lynch	Seattle	21 carries, 140 yards, 4 TD
11	Aaron Rodgers	Green Bay	22/36, 341 yards, 3 TDs	Le'Veon Bell	Pittsburgh	33 carries, 204 yards, TD
12	Tony Romo	Dallas	18/26, 279 yards, 4 TD	Justin Forsett	Baltimore	22 carries, 182 yards, 2 TD
13	Ryan Fitzpatrick	Houston	24/33, 358 yards, 6 TD	C. J. Anderson	Denver	32 carries, 168 yards
14	Ben Roethlisberger	Pittsburgh	25/39, 350 yards, 3 TD	Le'Veon Bell	Pittsburgh	26 carries, 185 yards, 2 TD
15	Ben Roethlisberger	Pittsburgh	27/35, 360 yards	Jeremy Hill	Cincinnati	25 carries, 148 yards, 2 TD
16	Philip Rivers	San Diego	33/54, 356 yards, 4 TD, 3 INT	Marshawn Lynch	Seattle	10 carries, 113 yards, 2 TD
17	Joe Flacco	Baltimore	22/36, 212 yards, 2 TD	Lamar Miller	Miami	19 carries, 178 yards, TD
POY	Aaron Rodgers	Green Bay	4,381 yards, 38 TD, 5 INT	Le'Veon Bell	Pittsburgh	290 carries, 1,361 yards, 8 TD

- Weeks 4-7: DeMarco Murray becomes first running back to win four consecutive weeks.

=== 2015 ===
	FedEx Air Player of the Week			FedEx Ground Player of the Week		
Week	Player	Team	Key statistics	Player	Team	Key statistics
1	Philip Rivers	San Diego	35/42, 404 yards, 2 TD, 2 INT	Carlos Hyde	San Francisco	26 carries, 168 yards, 2 TD
2	Tom Brady	New England	38/59, 466 yards, 3 TD	Matt Jones	Washington	19 carries, 123 yards, 2 TD
3	Aaron Rodgers	Green Bay	24/35, 333 Yds, 5 TDs	Devonta Freeman	Atlanta	30 carries, 141 yards, 3 TD
4	Philip Rivers	San Diego	23/38, 358 yards, 3 TD	Chris Ivory	NY Jets	29 carries, 166 yards, TD
5	Eli Manning	NY Giants	20/35, 212 yards, 3 TD, INT	Doug Martin	Tampa Bay	24 carries, 123 yards, 2 TD
6	Philip Rivers	San Diego	43/65, 503 yards, 2 TDs	Chris Ivory	NY Jets	20 carries, 146 yards, TD
7	Ryan Tannehill	Miami	18/19, 282 yards, 4 TDs	Lamar Miller	Miami	14 carries, 175 yards, TD
8	Drew Brees	New Orleans	39/50, 505 yards, 7 TD, 2 INT	Todd Gurley	St. Louis	20 carries, 133 yards, TD
9	Marcus Mariota	Tennessee	28/39, 371 yards, 4 TD	DeAngelo Williams	Pittsburgh	27 carries, 170 yards, 2 TD
10	Ben Roethlisberger	Pittsburgh	22/33, 379 yards, 3 TD, INT	Adrian Peterson	Minnesota	26 carries, 203 yards, TD
11	Jameis Winston	Tampa Bay	19/29, 246 yards, 5 TD	Doug Martin	Tampa Bay	27 carries, 235 yards
12	Russell Wilson	Seattle	21/30, 345 yds, 5 TD	Adrian Peterson	Minnesota	29 carries, 158 yards, 2 TD
13	Ben Roethlisberger	Pittsburgh	24/39, 364 yards, 4 TD	DeAngelo Williams	Pittsburgh	26 carries, 134 yards
14	Russell Wilson	Seattle	23/32, 292 yds, 5 TD	Eddie Lacy	Green Bay	24 carries, 124 yards, TD
15	Ben Roethlisberger	Pittsburgh	40/55, 380 yards, 3 TD, 2 INT	David Johnson	Arizona	29 carries, 187 Yds, 3 TD
16	Drew Brees	New Orleans	25/36, 412 yards, 3 TD	Tim Hightower	New Orleans	27 carries, 122 yards, 2 TD
17	Ryan Tannehill	Miami	25/38, 350 yards, 2 TD	Rashad Jennings	NY Giants	27 carries, 170 yards, TD
POY	Carson Palmer	Arizona	4,671 yards, 35 TD, 11 INT	Adrian Peterson	Minnesota	327 carries, 1,485 yards, 11 TD

- Week 8: Drew Brees tied the NFL record, and became the third "Air" player of the week to throw seven touchdown passes in a single game.
- Week 8: Todd Gurley becomes the first Rams running back to win "Ground" player of the week. Running backs from all 32 teams have now won at least one "Ground" award.

=== 2016 ===
	FedEx Air Player of the Week			FedEx Ground Player of the Week		
Week	Player	Team	Key statistics	Player	Team	Key statistics
1	Jameis Winston	Tampa Bay	23/32, 281 yards, 4 TD, INT	DeAngelo Williams	Pittsburgh	26 carries, 143 yards, 2 TD
2	Philip Rivers	San Diego	17/24, 220 yards, 4 TD	Matt Forte	NY Jets	30 carries, 100 yards, 3 TD
3	Trevor Siemian	Denver	23/35, 312 yards, 4 TD	LeSean McCoy	Buffalo	17 carries, 110 yards, 2 TD
4	Matt Ryan	Atlanta	28/37, 503 yards, 4 TD, INT	Ezekiel Elliott	Dallas	23 carries, 138 yards, TD
5	Ben Roethlisberger	Pittsburgh	34/47, 380 yards, 4 TD	Ezekiel Elliott	Dallas	15 carries, 134 yards, 2 TD
6	Drew Brees	New Orleans	34/49, 465 yards, 4 TD, INT	Jay Ajayi	Miami	25 carries, 204 yards, 2 TD
7	Aaron Rodgers	Green Bay	39/56, 326 yards, 3 TD	Jay Ajayi	Miami	28 carries, 214 yards, TD
8	Derek Carr	Oakland	40/59, 513 yards, 4 TDs	Jordan Howard	Chicago	26 carries, 153 yards, TD
9	Drew Brees	New Orleans	28/39, 323 yards, 3 TD	Latavius Murray	Oakland	20 carries, 114 yards, 3 TD
10	Marcus Mariota	Tennessee	19/26, 295 yards, 4 TD	DeMarco Murray	Tennessee	17 carries, 123 yards, TD
11	Kirk Cousins	Washington	21/30, 375 yards, 3 TD	Rob Kelley	Washington	24 carries, 137 yards, 3 TD
12	Drew Brees	New Orleans	28/36, 310 yards, 4 TD	Mark Ingram II	New Orleans	14 carries, 146 yards, TD
13	Joe Flacco	Baltimore	36/47, 381 yards, 4 TD, INT	Latavius Murray	Oakland	20 carries, 82 yards, 2 TD
14	Aaron Rodgers	Green Bay	18/23, 246 yards, 3 TD	Le'Veon Bell	Pittsburgh	38 carries, 236 yards, 3 TD
15	Matt Ryan	Atlanta	17/23, 286 yards, 2 TD	Devonta Freeman	Atlanta	20 carries, 139 yards, 3 TD
16	Aaron Rodgers	Green Bay	28/38, 347 yards, 4 TD	Jay Ajayi	Miami	32 carries, 206 yards, TD
17	Matt Ryan	Atlanta	27/36, 331 yards, 4 TD	Isaiah Crowell	Cleveland	19 carries, 152 yards
POY	Matt Ryan	Atlanta	4,944 yards, 38 TD, 7 INT	Ezekiel Elliott	Dallas	322 carries, 1,631 yards, 15 TD

=== 2017 ===
	FedEx Air Player of the Week			FedEx Ground Player of the Week		
Week	Player	Team	Key statistics	Player	Team	Key statistics
1	Alex Smith	Kansas City	28/35, 368 yards, 4 TD	Kareem Hunt	Kansas City	17 carries, 148 yards, TD
2	Trevor Siemian	Denver	30/50, 238 yards, 2 TD, 2 INT	C. J. Anderson	Denver	25 carries, 118 yards, TD
3	Tom Brady	New England	25/35, 378 yards, 5 TD	Kareem Hunt	Kansas City	17 carries, 172 yards, TD
4	Deshaun Watson	Houston	25/34, 283 yards, 4 TD, INT	Le'Veon Bell	Pittsburgh	35 carries, 144 yards, 2 TD
5	Carson Wentz	Philadelphia	21/30, 304 yards, 4 TD, INT	Leonard Fournette	Jacksonville	28 carries, 181 yards, 2 TD
6	Carson Wentz	Philadelphia	16/30, 222 yards, 3 TD	Adrian Peterson	Arizona	26 carries, 134 yards, 2 TD
7	Derek Carr	Oakland	29/52, 417 yards, 3 TD	Aaron Jones	Green Bay	17 carries, 131 yards, TD
8	Russell Wilson	Seattle	26/41, 452 yards, 4 TD, INT	LeSean McCoy	Buffalo	27 carries, 161 yards, TD
9	Jay Cutler	Miami	34/42, 311 yards, 3 TD	Alvin Kamara	New Orleans	5 carries, 25 yards
10	Case Keenum	Vikings	21/29, 304 yards, 4 TD, 2 INT	Mark Ingram II	New Orleans	21 carries, 131 yards, 3 TD
11	Drew Brees	New Orleans	29/41, 385 yards, 2 TD, INT	Mark Ingram II	New Orleans	11 carries, 134 yards, TD
12	Philip Rivers	LA Chargers	27/33, 434 yards, 3 TD	Alvin Kamara	New Orleans	5 carries, 87 yards, TD
13	Alex Smith	Kansas City	19/33, 366 yards, 4 TD	Jamaal Williams	Green Bay	21 carries, 113 yards, TD
14	Ben Roethlisberger	Pittsburgh	44/66, 506 yards, 2 TD	LeSean McCoy	Buffalo	32 carries, 156 yards, TD
15	Jimmy Garoppolo	San Francisco	31/43, 381 yards, TD	Todd Gurley	LA Rams	21 carries, 152 yards, 3 TD
16	Jared Goff	LA Rams	22/38, 301 yards, 4 TD	Todd Gurley	LA Rams	22 carries, 118 yards
17	Philip Rivers	LA Chargers	28/37, 387 yards, 3 TD	Orleans Darkwa	NY Giants	20 carries, 154 yards, TD
POY	Carson Wentz	Philadelphia	3,296 yards, 33 TD, 7 INT	Todd Gurley	LA Rams	279 carries, 1,305 yards, 13 TD

=== 2018 ===
	FedEx Air Player of the Week			FedEx Ground Player of the Week		
Week	Player	Team	Key statistics	Player	Team	Key statistics
1	Ryan Fitzpatrick	Tampa Bay	21/28, 417 yards, 4 TD	James Conner	Pittsburgh	31 carries, 135 yards, 2 TD
2	Patrick Mahomes	Kansas City	23/28, 326 yards, 6 TD	Matt Breida	San Francisco	11 carries, 138 yards, TD
3	Drew Brees	New Orleans	39/49, 396 yards, 3 TD	Adrian Peterson	Washington	19 carries, 120 yards, 2 TD
4	Mitchell Trubisky	Chicago	19/26, 354 yards, 6 TD	Alvin Kamara	New Orleans	19 carries, 134 yards, 3 TD
5	Drew Brees	New Orleans	26/29, 363 yards, 3 TD	Isaiah Crowell	NY Jets	15 carries, 219 yards, TD
6	Aaron Rodgers	Green Bay	25/46, 425 yards, 2 TD	Todd Gurley	LA Rams	28 carries, 208 yards, 2 TD
7	Patrick Mahomes	Kansas City	28/39, 358 yards, 4 TD, INT	Kerryon Johnson	Detroit	19 carries, 158 yards
8	Patrick Mahomes	Kansas City	24/34, 303 yards, 4 TD, INT	James Conner	Pittsburgh	24 carries, 146 yards, 2 TD
9	Drew Brees	New Orleans	25/36, 346 yards, 4 TD	Kareem Hunt	Kansas City	17 carries, 91 yards, 2 TD
10	Mitchell Trubisky	Chicago	23/30, 355 yards, 3 TD	Nick Chubb	Cleveland	20 carries, 176 yards, TD
11	Drew Brees	New Orleans	22/30, 363 yards, 4 TD	Saquon Barkley	NY Giants	27 carries, 142 yards, 2 TD
12	Andrew Luck	Indianapolis	30/37, 343 yards, 3 TD, 2 INT	Christian McCaffrey	Carolina	17 carries, 125 yards, TD
13	Philip Rivers	LA Chargers	26/36, 299 yards, 2 TD	Phillip Lindsay	Denver	19 carries, 157 yards, 2 TD
14	Dak Prescott	Dallas	42/54, 455 yards, 2 INT, 3 TD	Derrick Henry	Tennessee	17 carries, 238 yards, 4 TD
15	Philip Rivers	LA Chargers	26/38, 313 yards, 2 TD, 2 INT	Derrick Henry	Tennessee	33 carries, 170 yards, 2 TD
16	Nick Foles	Philadelphia	35/49, 471 yards, 4 TD, INT	C. J. Anderson	LA Rams	20 carries, 167 yards, TD
17	Dak Prescott	Dallas	27/44, 387 yards, 4 TD	Jordan Howard	Chicago	21 carries, 109 yards, 2 TD
POY	Patrick Mahomes	Kansas City	5,097 yards, 50 TD, 12 INT	Saquon Barkley	NY Giants	261 carries, 1,307 yards, 11 TD

- Week 3: Drew Brees passed Brett Favre for most career pass completions.
- Week 3: Adrian Peterson became the first player to win Ground Player of the Week for three different teams; 18th Ground Player award
- Week 5: Drew Brees became the NFL's all-time leader in passing yards; 30th Air Player of the Week award
- Week 11: Drew Brees set NFL record with 23rd game with 4+ TD and no INTs.

=== 2019 ===
	FedEx Air Player of the Week			FedEx Ground Player of the Week		
Week	Player	Team	Key Statistics	Player	Team	Key Statistics
1	Lamar Jackson	Baltimore	17/20, 324 yards, 5 TD	Marlon Mack	Indianapolis	25 carries, 174 yards, TD
2	Patrick Mahomes	Kansas City	30/44, 443 yards, 4 TD	Dalvin Cook	Minnesota	20 carries, 154 yards, TD
3	Patrick Mahomes	Kansas City	27/37, 374 yards, 3 TD	Christian McCaffrey	Carolina	24 carries, 153 yards, TD
4	Jameis Winston	Tampa Bay	28/41, 385 yards, 4 TD, INT	Nick Chubb	Cleveland	20 carries, 165 yards, 3 TD
5	Deshaun Watson	Houston	28/33, 426 yards, 5 TD	Aaron Jones	Green Bay	19 carries, 107 yards, 4 TD
6	Kirk Cousins	Minnesota	22/29, 333 yards, 4 TD, INT	Lamar Jackson	Baltimore	19 carries, 152 yards, TD
7	Aaron Rodgers	Green Bay	25/31, 429 yards, 5 TD	Dalvin Cook	Minnesota	25 carries, 142 yards, 2 TD
8	Aaron Rodgers	Green Bay	23/33, 305 yards, 3 TD	Tevin Coleman	San Francisco	11 carries, 105 yards, 3 TD
9	Russell Wilson	Seattle	29/43, 378 yards, 5 TD	Christian McCaffrey	Carolina	24 carries, 146 yards, 2 TD
10	Lamar Jackson	Baltimore	15/17, 223 yards, 3 TD	Derrick Henry	Tennessee	23 carries, 188 yards, 2 TD
11	Dak Prescott	Dallas	29/46, 444 yards, 3 TD	Marlon Mack	Indianapolis	14 carries, 109 yards, TD
12	Lamar Jackson	Baltimore	15/20, 169 yards, 5 TD	Derrick Henry	Tennessee	19 carries, 159 yards, 2 TD
13	Mitchell Trubisky	Chicago	29/38, 338 yards, 3 TD, INT	Derrick Henry	Tennessee	26 carries, 149 yards, TD
14	Ryan Tannehill	Tennessee	21/27, 391 yards, 3 TD, INT	Derrick Henry	Tennessee	18 carries, 103 yards, 2 TD
15	Drew Brees	New Orleans	29/30, 307 yards, 4 TD	Kenyan Drake	Arizona	22 carries, 137 yards, 4 TD
16	Daniel Jones	NY Giants	28/42, 352 yards, 5 TD	Saquon Barkley	NY Giants	22 carries, 189 yards, TD
17	Ryan Fitzpatrick	Miami	28/41, 320 yards, TD	Derrick Henry	Tennessee	32 carries, 211 yards, 3 TD
POY	Lamar Jackson	Baltimore	3,127 yards, 36 TD, 6 INT	Derrick Henry	Tennessee	303 carries, 1,540 yards, 16 TD

=== 2020 ===
	FedEx Air Player of the Week			FedEx Ground Player of the Week		
Week	Player	Team	Key Statistics	Player	Team	Key Statistics
1	Russell Wilson	Seattle	31/35, 322 yards, 4 TD	Clyde Edwards-Helaire	Kansas City	25 carries, 138 yards, TD
2	Josh Allen	Buffalo	24/35, 415 yards, 4 TD	Aaron Jones	Green Bay	18 carries, 168 yards, 2 TD
3	Russell Wilson	Seattle	27/40, 315 yards, 5 TD	Dalvin Cook	Minnesota	22 carries, 181 yards, TD
4	Tom Brady	Tampa Bay	30/46, 369 yards, 5 TD, INT	Joe Mixon	Cincinnati	25 carries, 151 yards, 2 TD
5	Derek Carr	Las Vegas	22/31, 347 yards, 3 TD, INT	Todd Gurley	Atlanta	14 carries, 121 yards, TD
6	Ryan Tannehill	Tennessee	30/41, 364 yards, 4 TD, INT	Derrick Henry	Tennessee	22 carries, 212 yards, 2 TD
7	Joe Burrow	Cincinnati	35/47, 406 yards, 3 TD, INT	Jeff Wilson	San Francisco	17 carries, 112 yards, 3 TD
8	Patrick Mahomes	Kansas City	31/42, 416 yards, 5 TD	Dalvin Cook	Minnesota	30 carries, 163 yards, 3 TD
9	Josh Allen	Buffalo	31/38, 415 yards, 3 TD	Dalvin Cook	Minnesota	22 carries, 206 yards, 2 TD
10	Ben Roethlisberger	Pittsburgh	27/46, 333 yards, 4 TD	Ronald Jones II	Tampa Bay	23 carries, 192 yards, TD
11	Justin Herbert	LA Chargers	37/49, 366 yards, 3 TD	Derrick Henry	Tennessee	28 carries, 133 yards, TD
12	Patrick Mahomes	Kansas City	37/49, 462 yards, 3 TD	Derrick Henry	Tennessee	27 carries, 178 yards, 3 TD
13	Baker Mayfield	Cleveland	25/33, 334 yards, 4 TD	Aaron Jones	Green Bay	15 carries, 130 yards, TD
14	Drew Lock	Denver	21/27, 280 yards, 4 TD	Derrick Henry	Tennessee	26 carries, 215 yards, 2 TD
15	Josh Allen	Buffalo	28/40, 359 yards, 2 TD	Derrick Henry	Tennessee	24 carries, 147 yards, TD
16	Brandon Allen	Cincinnati	29/37, 371 yards, 2 TD	Alvin Kamara	New Orleans	22 carries, 155 yards, 6 TD
17	Tom Brady	Tampa Bay	26/41, 399 yards, 4 TD, INT	Jonathan Taylor	Indianapolis	30 carries, 253 yards, 2 TD
POY	Aaron Rodgers	Green Bay	4,299 yards, 48 TD, 5 INT	Derrick Henry	Tennessee	378 carries, 2,027 yards, 17 TD

=== 2021 ===
	FedEx Air Player of the Week			FedEx Ground Player of the Week		
Week	Player	Team	Key statistics	Player	Team	Key statistics
1	Tom Brady	Tampa Bay	32/50, 379 yards, 4 TD, 2 INT	Joe Mixon	Cincinnati	29 carries, 127 yards, TD
2	Tom Brady	Tampa Bay	24/36, 276 yards, 5 TD	Derrick Henry	Tennessee	35 carries, 182 yards, 3 TD
3	Justin Herbert	LA Chargers	26/38, 281 yards, 4 TD	Derrick Henry	Tennessee	28 carries, 113 yards
4	Joe Burrow	Cincinnati	25/32, 348 yards, 2 TD	Ezekiel Elliott	Dallas	20 carries, 143 yards, TD
5	Justin Herbert	LA Chargers	26/43, 398 yards, 4 TD	Derrick Henry	Tennessee	29 carries, 130 yards, 3 TD
6	Dak Prescott	Dallas	36/51, 445 yards, 3 TD, INT	Jonathan Taylor	Indianapolis	14 carries, 145 yards, 2 TD
7	Joe Burrow	Cincinnati	23/38, 416 yards, 3 TD, INT	D'Ernest Johnson	Cleveland	22 carries, 146 yards, TD
8	Mike White	NY Jets	37/45, 405 yards, 3 TD, 2 INT	Elijah Mitchell	San Francisco	18 carries, 137 yards, TD
9	Justin Herbert	LA Chargers	32/38, 356 yards, 2 TD	Nick Chubb	Cleveland	14 carries, 137 yards, 2 TD
10	Dak Prescott	Dallas	24/31, 296 yards, 2 TD	Jonathan Taylor	Indianapolis	21 carries, 116 yards, TD
11	Justin Herbert	LA Chargers	30/41, 382 yards, 3 TD, INT	Joe Mixon	Cincinnati	30 carries, 123 yards, 2 TD
12	Dak Prescott	Dallas	32/47, 375 yards, 2 TD	Joe Mixon	Cincinnati	28 carries, 165 yards, 2 TD
13	Justin Herbert	LA Chargers	26/35, 317 yards, 3 TD, INT	Jonathan Taylor	Indianapolis	32 carries, 143 yards, 2 TD
14	Justin Herbert	LA Chargers	23/31, 275 yards, 3 TD	Dalvin Cook	Minnesota	27 carries, 205 yards, 2 TD
15	Jared Goff	Detroit	21/26, 216 yards, 3 TD	Jonathan Taylor	Indianapolis	29 carries, 170 yards, TD
16	Joe Burrow	Cincinnati	37/46, 525 yards, 4 TD	Rex Burkhead	Houston	22 carries, 149 yards, 2 TD
17	Joe Burrow	Cincinnati	30/39, 446 yards, 4 TD	Rashaad Penny	Seattle	25 carries, 170 yards, 2 TD
18	Tom Brady	Tampa Bay	29/37, 326 yards, 3 TD	Rashaad Penny	Seattle	23 carries, 190 yards, 2 TD
POY	Tom Brady	Tampa Bay	5,316 yards, 43 TD, 12 INT	Jonathan Taylor	Indianapolis	332 carries, 1,811 yards, 18 TD

=== 2022 ===
	FedEx Air Player of the Week			FedEx Ground Player of the Week		
Week	Player	Team	Key statistics	Player	Team	Key statistics
1	Patrick Mahomes	Kansas City	30/39, 360 yards, 5 TD	Jonathan Taylor	Indianapolis	31 carries, 161 yards, TD
2	Tua Tagovailoa	Miami	36/50, 469 yards, 6 TD, 2 INT	Aaron Jones	Green Bay	15 carries, 132 yards, TD
3	Jalen Hurts	Philadelphia	22/35, 340 yards, 3 TD	Khalil Herbert	Chicago	20 carries, 157 yards, 2 TD
4	Jared Goff	Detroit	26/39, 378 yards, 4 TD, INT	Rashaad Penny	Seattle	17 carries, 151 yards, 2 TDs
5	Josh Allen	Buffalo	20/31, 424 yards, 4 TD, INT	Taysom Hill	New Orleans	9 carries, 112 yards, 3 TDs
6	Joe Burrow	Cincinnati	28/37, 300 yards, 3 TD	Breece Hall	NY Jets	20 carries, 116 yards, TD
7	Joe Burrow	Cincinnati	34/42, 481 yards, 3 TD	Kenneth Walker III	Seattle	23 carries, 168 yards, 2 TD
8	Tua Tagovailoa	Miami	29/36, 382 yards, 3 TD	Tony Pollard	Dallas	14 carries, 131 yards, 3 TD
9	Tua Tagovailoa	Miami	21/30, 302 yards, 3 TD	Joe Mixon	Cincinnati	22 carries, 153 yards, 4 TD
10	Tua Tagovailoa	Miami	25/32, 285 yards, 3 TD	Justin Fields	Chicago	13 carries, 147 yards, 2 TD
11	Joe Burrow	Cincinnati	24/39, 355 yards, 4 TD, 2 INT	Jamaal Williams	Detroit	17 carries, 64 yards, 3 TD
12	Mike White	NY Jets	22/28, 315 yards, 3 TD	Josh Jacobs	Las Vegas	33 carries, 229 yards, 2 TD
13	Jalen Hurts	Philadelphia	29/39, 380 yards, 3 TD	Josh Jacobs	Las Vegas	26 carries, 144 yards, TD
14	Jared Goff	Detroit	27/39, 330 yards, 3 TD	Christian McCaffrey	San Francisco	14 carries, 119 yards, TD
15	Kirk Cousins	Minnesota	34/54, 460 yards, 4 TD, 2 INT	Rhamondre Stevenson	New England	19 carries, 172 yards, TD
16	Dak Prescott	Dallas	27/35, 347 yards, 3 TD, INT	Cam Akers	LA Rams	23 carries, 118 yards, 3 TD
17	Tom Brady	Tampa Bay	34/45, 432 yards, 3 TD	Jamaal Williams	Detroit	22 carries, 144 yards, TD
18	Josh Allen	Buffalo	19/31, 254 yards, 3 TD, INT	Kenneth Walker III	Seattle	29 carries, 114 yards
POY	Joe Burrow	Cincinnati	4,475 passing yards, 35 TD, 12 INT	Josh Jacobs	Las Vegas	340 carries, 1,653 yards, 12 TD

- Week 15: Viking–Colts game; largest comeback in NFL history.

=== 2023 ===
	FedEx Air Player of the Week			FedEx Ground Player of the Week		
Week	Player	Team	Key Statistics	Player	Team	Key Statistics
1	Tua Tagovailoa	Miami	28/45, 466 yards, 3 TD, INT	Christian McCaffrey	San Francisco	22 carries, 151 yards, TD
2	Geno Smith	Seattle	32/41, 328 yards, 2 TD	Christian McCaffrey	San Francisco	20 carries, 116 yards, TD
3	Tua Tagovailoa	Miami	23/26, 309 yards, 4 TD	De'Von Achane	Miami	18 carries, 203 yards, 2 TD
4	Josh Allen	Buffalo	21/25, 320 yards, 4 TD	Christian McCaffrey	San Francisco	20 carries, 106 yards, 3 TD
5	Joe Burrow	Cincinnati	36/46, 317 yards, 3 TD, INT	Breece Hall	NY Jets	22 carries, 177 yards, TD
6	Jared Goff	Detroit	30/44, 353 yards, 2 TD	Raheem Mostert	Miami	17 carries, 115 yards, 2 TD
7	Patrick Mahomes	Kansas City	32/42, 424 yards, 4 TD, INT	D'Onta Foreman	Chicago	16 carries, 89 yards, 2 TD
8	Jalen Hurts	Philadelphia	29/38, 319 yards, 4 TD	Gus Edwards	Baltimore	19 carries, 80 yards, 3 TD
9	C. J. Stroud	Houston	30/42, 470 yards, 5 TD	Keaton Mitchell	Baltimore	9 carries, 138 yards, TD
10	Dak Prescott	Dallas	26/35, 404 yards, 4 TD, INT	Devin Singletary	Houston	30 carries, 150 yards, TD
11	Brock Purdy	San Francisco	21/25, 333 yards, 3 TD	Jaylen Warren	Pittsburgh	9 carries, 129 yards, TD
12	Dak Prescott	Dallas	22/32, 331 yards, 4 TD	Christian McCaffrey	San Francisco	19 carries, 114 yards, 2 TD
13	Brock Purdy	San Francisco	19/27, 314 yards, 4 TD	James Conner	Arizona	25 carries, 105 yards, 2 TD
14	Brock Purdy	San Francisco	19/27, 368 yards, 2 TD, INT	Christian McCaffrey	San Francisco	16 carries, 145 yards
15	Baker Mayfield	Tampa Bay	22/28, 381 yards, 4 TD	James Cook	Buffalo	25 carries, 179 yards, TD
16	Joe Flacco	Cleveland	27/42, 368 yards, 3 TD, 2 INT	Khalil Herbert	Chicago	20 carries, 112 yards, TD
17	Lamar Jackson	Baltimore	18/21, 321 yards, 5 TD	Najee Harris	Pittsburgh	27 carries, 122 yards, 2 TD
18	Jordan Love	Green Bay	27/32, 316 yards, 2 TD	Derrick Henry	Tennessee	19 carries, 153 yards, TD
POY	Brock Purdy	San Francisco	3,864 passing yards, 31 TD, 11 INT	Christian McCaffrey	San Francisco	272 carries, 1,459 yards, 21 TD

=== 2024 ===
Beginning in 2024, players were no longer separated into specific "Air" (quarterbacks) and "Ground" (running backs) categories. Eligibility was updated to include wide receivers and tight ends. Six nominees (typically) were named for each week, with the top two vote-getters overall declared the "Air & Ground Players of the Week".

FedEx Air & Ground Players of the Week
Week	Player	Pos	Team	Key Statistics
1	Baker Mayfield	QB	Tampa Bay	24/30, 289 yards, 4 TD
1	Joe Mixon	RB	Houston	30 carries, 159 yards, TD
2	Kyler Murray	QB	Arizona	17/21, 266 yards, 3 TD
2	Alvin Kamara	RB	New Orleans	20 carries, 115 yards, 3 TD
3	Andy Dalton	QB	Carolina	26/37, 319 yards, 3 TD
3	Jauan Jennings	WR	San Francisco	11 receptions, 175 yards, 3 TD
4	Jayden Daniels	QB	Washington	26/30, 233 yards, TD, INT
4	Derrick Henry	RB	Baltimore	24 carries, 199 yards, TD
5	Joe Burrow	QB	Cincinnati	30/39, 392 yards, 5 TD, INT
5	Ja'Marr Chase	WR	Cincinnati	10 receptions, 193 yards, 2 TD
6	Jordan Love	QB	Green Bay	22/32, 258 yards, 4 TD, INT
6	Caleb Williams	QB	Chicago	23/29, 226 yards, 4 TD, INT
7	Jared Goff	QB	Detroit	22/25, 280 yards, 2 TD
7	Jahmyr Gibbs	RB	Detroit	15 carries, 116 yards, 2 TD
8	Jayden Daniels	QB	Washington	21/38, 326 yards, TD
8	Jahmyr Gibbs	RB	Detroit	11 carries, 127 yards, TD
9	Joe Burrow	QB	Cincinnati	27/39, 251 yards, 5 TD, INT
9	Saquon Barkley	RB	Philadelphia	27 carries, 169 yards, TD
10	Joe Burrow	QB	Cincinnati	34/56, 428 yards, 4 TD
10	Ja'Marr Chase	WR	Cincinnati	11 receptions, 264 yards, 3 TD
11	Bo Nix	QB	Denver	28/33, 307 yards, 4 TD
11	Taysom Hill	TE	New Orleans	7 carries, 138 yards, 3 TD
12	Tua Tagovailoa	QB	Miami	29/40, 317 yards, 4 TD
12	Saquon Barkley	RB	Philadelphia	26 carries, 255 yards, 2 TD
13	Russell Wilson	QB	Pittsburgh	29/38, 414 yards, 3 TD, INT
13	Josh Allen	QB	Buffalo	13/17, 148 yards, 2 TD
14	Josh Allen	QB	Buffalo	22/37, 342 yards, 3 TD
14	Zach Charbonnet	RB	Seattle	22 carries, 134 yards, 2 TD
15	Josh Allen	QB	Buffalo	23/34, 362 yards, 2 TD
15	Mike Evans	WR	Tampa Bay	9 receptions, 159 yards, 2 TD
16	Jayden Daniels	QB	Washington	24/39, 258 yards, 5 TD, 2 INT; 9 carries, 81 yards
16	Jonathan Taylor	RB	Indianapolis	29 carries, 218 yards, 3 TD
17	Joe Burrow	QB	Cincinnati	39/49, 412 yards, 3 TD
17	Tee Higgins	WR	Cincinnati	11 receptions, 131 yards, 3 TD
18	Bo Nix	QB	Denver	26/29, 321 yards, 4 TD
18	Jahmyr Gibbs	RB	Detroit	23 carries, 139 yards, 3 TD
POY	Josh Allen	QB	Buffalo	3,731 yards, 28 TD, 6 INT
POY	Ja'Marr Chase	WR	Cincinnati	127 receptions, 1,708 yards, 17 TD

- Week 3: Andy Dalton becomes the first Carolina quarterback to win a weekly award. Quarterbacks from all 32 teams have now won at least once.

=== 2025 ===
FedEx Air & Ground Players of the Week
Week	Player	Pos	Team	Key Statistics
1	Josh Allen	QB	Buffalo	33/46, 394 yards, 2 TD
1	Derrick Henry	RB	Baltimore	18 carries, 169 yards, 2 TD
2	Ja'Marr Chase	WR	Cincinnati	14 receptions, 165 yards, TD
2	Amon-Ra St. Brown	WR	Detroit	9 receptions, 115 yards, 3 TD
3	Caleb Williams	QB	Chicago	19/28, 298 yards, 4 TD
3	Jonathan Taylor	RB	Indianapolis	17 carries, 102 yards, 3 TD
4	Ashton Jeanty	RB	Las Vegas	21 carries, 138 yards, TD
4	Puka Nacua	WR	LA Rams	13 receptions, 170 yards, TD
5	Baker Mayfield	QB	Tampa Bay	29/33, 379 yards, 2 TD
5	Jacory Croskey-Merritt	RB	Washington	14 carries, 111 yards, 2 TD
6	Rico Dowdle	RB	Carolina	30 carries, 183 yards
6	Cam Skattebo	RB	NY Giants	19 carries, 98 yards, 3 TD
7	Ja'Marr Chase	WR	Cincinnati	16 receptions, 161 yards, TD
7	Jonathan Taylor	RB	Indianapolis	16 carries, 94 yards, 3 TD
8	Jordan Love	QB	Green Bay	29/37, 360 yards, 3 TD
8	Jonathan Taylor	RB	Indianapolis	12 carries, 153 yards, 2 TD
9	Sam Darnold	QB	Seattle	21/24, 330 yards, 4 TD, INT
9	Rico Dowdle	RB	Carolina	25 carries, 130 yards, 2 TD
10	Jonathan Taylor	RB	Indianapolis	32 carries, 244 yards, 3 TD
10	Jahmyr Gibbs	RB	Detroit	15 carries, 142 yards, 2 TD
11	Tetairoa McMillan	WR	Carolina	8 receptions, 130 yards, 2 TD
11	Bryce Young	QB	Carolina	31/45, 448 yards, 3 TD
12	Jahmyr Gibbs	RB	Detroit	15 carries, 219 yards, 2 TD
12	Emanuel Wilson	RB	Green Bay	28 carries, 107 yards, 2 TD
13	Jordan Love	QB	Green Bay	18/30, 234 yards, 4 TD
13	D'Andre Swift	RB	Chicago	18 carries, 125 yards, TD
14	Josh Allen	QB	Buffalo	22/28, 251 yards, 3 TD
14	Jahmyr Gibbs	RB	Detroit	12 carries, 43 yards, 3 TD
15	Trevor Lawrence	QB	Jacksonville	20/32, 330 yards, 5 TD
15	Bo Nix	QB	Denver	23/34, 302 yards, 4 TD
16	Trevor Lawrence	QB	Jacksonville	23/36, 279 yards, 3 TD
16	Joe Burrow	QB	Cincinnati	25/32, 309 yards, 4 TD
17	Joe Burrow	QB	Cincinnati	24/31, 305 yards, 2 TD
17	Derrick Henry	RB	Baltimore	36 carries, 216 yards, 4 TD
18	Trevor Lawrence	QB	Jacksonville	22/30, 255 yards, 3 TD
18	Mitchell Trubisky	QB	Buffalo	22/29, 259 yards, 4 TD
POY	Drake Maye	QB	New England	4,394 yards, 31 TD, 8 INT
POY	Christian McCaffrey	RB	San Francisco	311 carries, 1,202 yards, 17 TD
POY	Jaxon Smith-Njigba	WR	Seattle	119 receptions, 1,793 yards, 10 TD

=== 2026 ===
FedEx Air & Ground Players of the Week
Week	Player	Pos	Team	Key Statistics
1	Josh Allen	QB	Buffalo	20/29, 334 yards, 2 TD
1	Caleb Williams	QB	Chicago	21/29, 269 yards, 2 TD
2	Josh Allen	QB	Buffalo	20/31, 248 yards, 3 TD
2	Jaxon Smith-Njigba	WR	Seattle	9 receptions, 155 yards, 3 TD
3	Marcus Mariota	QB	Washington	19/31, 183 yards, 3 TD
3	Brock Purdy	QB	San Francisco	15/27, 297 yards, 4 TD
4	Kenneth Walker III	RB	Kansas City	22 carries, 177 yards, 2 TD
4	Tetairoa McMillan	WR	Carolina	14 receptions, 192 yards, 2 TD
5	Drake Maye	QB	New England	26/34, 374 yards, 4 TD
5	Jordan Love	QB	Green Bay	25/31, 367 yards, 2 TD
6	Kenneth Walker III	RB	Kansas City	19 carries, 128 yards, 2 TD
6	Malik Nabers	WR	NY Giants	12 receptions, 165 yards
7	Joe Burrow	QB	Cincinnati	22/30, 292 yards, 4 TD
7	Jaxon Smith-Njigba	WR	Seattle	9 receptions, 150 yards, TD
8	Joe Burrow	QB	Cincinnati	38/48, 462 yards, 5 TD, 3 INT
8	Jordan Love	QB	Green Bay	30/41, 288 yards, 3 TD, INT
9	Joe Burrow	QB	Cincinnati	24/29, 271 yards, 3 TD
9	Jordan Love	QB	Green Bay	23/29, 372 yards, 3 TD
10	Joe Burrow	QB	Cincinnati	35/44, 409 yards, 4 TD
10	Christian McCaffrey	WR	San Francisco	4 receptions, 161 yards, 2 TD

- Weeks 7–9: Joe Burrow becomes third quarterback (after Aaron Rodgers in 2011 and Tua Tagovailoa in 2022) to win three consecutive weeks.
- Weeks 7–10: Joe Burrow becomes second quarterback (after Aaron Rodgers in 2011) to win four consecutive weeks.

== Statistics ==
=== Most career Air Player of the Week awards ===
Awards	Player	Pos
33	Drew Brees	QB
21	Aaron Rodgers	QB
20	Brett Favre	QB
20	Tom Brady	QB
19	Joe Burrow*	QB
16	Ben Roethlisberger	QB
14	Peyton Manning	QB
14	Philip Rivers	QB
13	Josh Allen*	QB

* Includes non-categorized awards since 2024

=== Most career Ground Player of the Week awards ===
Awards	Player	Pos
19	Derrick Henry*	RB
18	Adrian Peterson	RB
18	LaDainian Tomlinson	RB
12	Jonathan Taylor*	RB
10	Christian McCaffrey	RB
9	LeSean McCoy	RB

* Includes non-categorized awards since 2024

=== Most consecutive Air/Ground weekly awards ===
Awards	Player	Pos	Season
4	Aaron Rodgers	QB	2011 (Week 4–7)
4	DeMarco Murray	RB	2014 (Week 4–7)
4	Joe Burrow	QB	2026 (Week 7–10)
3	LaDainian Tomlinson	RB	2006 (Week 9–11)
3	LaDainian Tomlinson	RB	2006 (Week 13–15)
3	Derrick Henry	RB	2019 (Week 12–14)
3	Tua Tagovailoa	QB	2022 (Week 8–10)

=== Most career Air/Ground Player of the Year awards ===
Awards	Player	Pos
4	Peyton Manning	QB
4	Drew Brees	QB
3	Aaron Rodgers	QB
3	Adrian Peterson	RB
2	Carson Palmer	QB
2	Derrick Henry	RB
2	LeSean McCoy	RB
2	Christian McCaffrey	RB
