= 2026 Seattle Seahawks season =

American football team season

- Owner: Family of Vinod Khosla
- General manager: John Schneider
- President: Chuck Arnold
- Head coach: Mike Macdonald
- Offensive coordinator: Brian Fleury
- Defensive coordinator: Aden Durde
- Home stadium: Lumen Field

Results
- Record: 6–4
- Division place: 2nd NFC West

Uniform
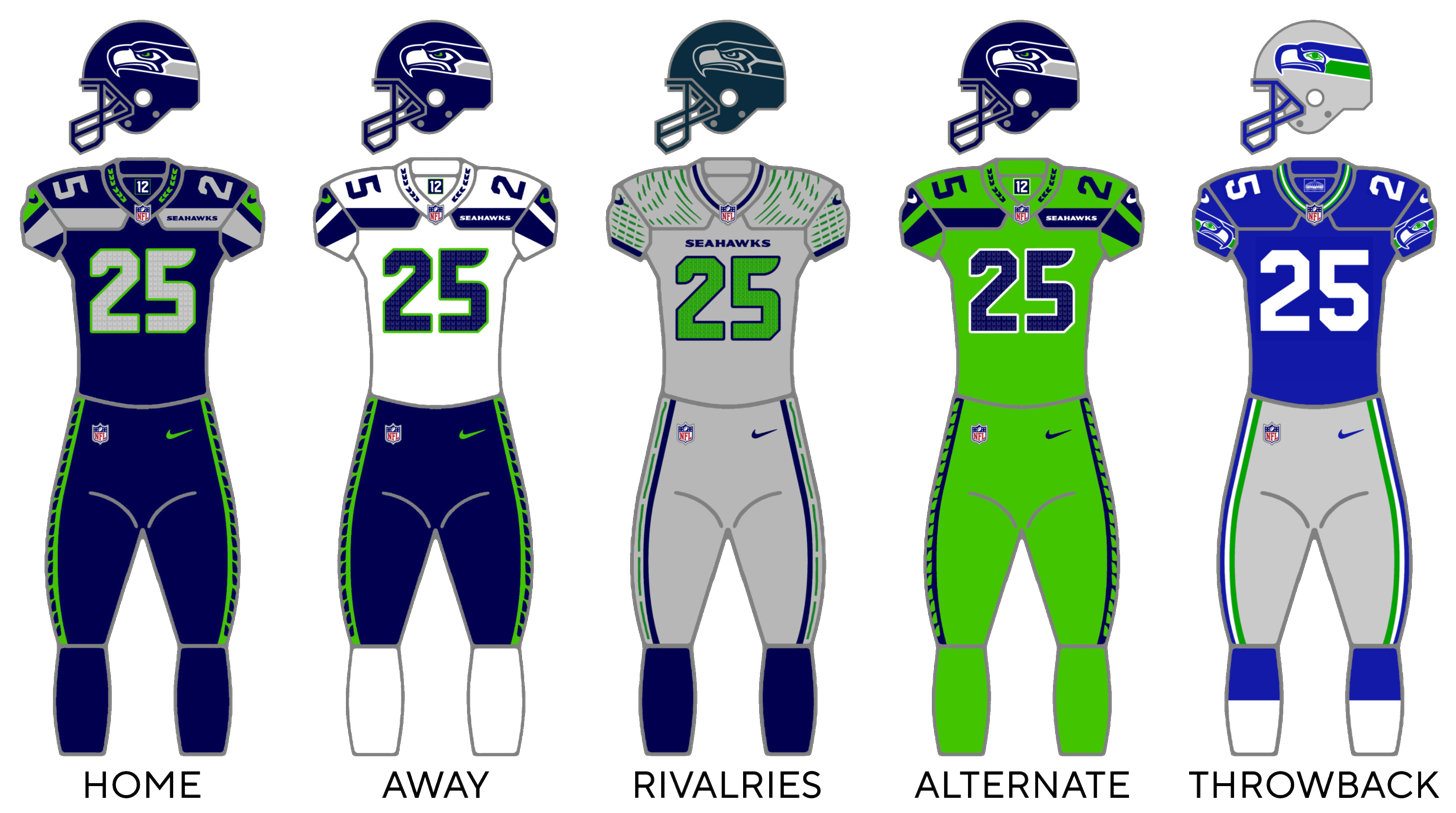

The 2026 season is the Seattle Seahawks' 51st in the National Football League (NFL), their first under the ownership of the Khosla family, their 17th under the leadership of general manager John Schneider and their third under head coach Mike Macdonald. They entered the season as the defending Super Bowl champions and having previously achieved 14–3 regular season record. Brian Fluery was the team's fourth offensive coordinator in as many seasons, as their previous offensive coordinator, Klint Kubiak, departed to become the Las Vegas Raiders head coach. The team's starting quarterback, Sam Darnold, injured his glute on the first drive (the 5th snap) of their season opener, temporarily sidelining him until their Week 3 game. The Seahawks failed to improve on their 14–3 record from 2025 an overtime loss on the road to the Denver Broncos, and ensured a worse record after a home loss to the Chicago Bears.

== Offseason ==
=== Coaching changes ===
2026 Seattle Seahawks coaching staff changes
Position	Previous coach(es)	Vacancy reason	Replacement(s)	Source(s)
Offensive coordinator	Klint Kubiak, 2025	Accepted job as Las Vegas Raiders head coach	Brian Fleury	
Run game coordinator & senior offensive advisor	Rick Dennison, 2025	Accepted job with Las Vegas Raiders	Justin Outten (as run game coordinator)	
Quarterbacks coach	Andrew Janocko, 2025	Accepted job with Las Vegas Raiders	Tyson Prince and Jake Peetz	
Running backs coach	Kennedy Polamalu, 2024-2025	Parted ways	Thomas Hammock	
Run game specialist & assistant offensive line coach	Justin Outten, 2025	Promoted to run game coordinator	Quinshon Odom (as assistant offensive line coach)	
Assistant tight ends coach	None	Position created	Michael Byrne	
Inside linebackers coach	Kirk Olivadotti, 2024–2025	Promoted to senior defensive assistant	Zach Orr	
Outside linebackers coach	Chris Partridge, 2024–2025	Promoted to defensive run game coordinator	Josh Bynes	

=== Free agents ===
Position	Player	Tag	2026 team	Date signed	Contract
CB	Josh Jobe	UFA	Seattle Seahawks	March 10, 2026	3 years, $24 million
S	Coby Bryant	UFA	Chicago Bears	March 11, 2026	3 years, $40 million
WR	Rashid Shaheed	UFA	Seattle Seahawks	March 11, 2026	3 years, $51 million
OT	Josh Jones	UFA	Seattle Seahawks	March 12, 2026	1 year, $4 million
DE	Boye Mafe	UFA	Cincinnati Bengals	March 12, 2026	3 years, $60 million
FB	Brady Russell	UFA	Seattle Seahawks	March 12, 2026	2 years, $4.8 million
RB	Kenneth Walker III	UFA	Kansas City Chiefs	March 12, 2026	3 years, $45 million
CB	Riq Woolen	UFA	Philadelphia Eagles	March 12, 2026	1 year, $15 million
WR	Dareke Young	UFA	Las Vegas Raiders	March 13, 2026	1 year, $2 million
DT	Brandon Pili	RFA	Seattle Seahawks	March 16, 2026	1 year, $2 million
WR	Cody White	RFA	Seattle Seahawks	March 18, 2026	1 year, $1.1 million
CB	Shemar Jean-Charles	UFA	Seattle Seahawks	March 24, 2026	1 year, $1.2 million

=== Signings ===
Position	Player	Previous team	Date signed	Contract
RB	Emanuel Wilson	Green Bay Packers	March 13, 2026	1 year, $2.1 million
S	Rodney Thomas II	Indianapolis Colts	March 16, 2026	1 year, $1.4 million
S	D'Anthony Bell	Carolina Panthers	March 23, 2026	1 year, $1.49 million
LB	Dante Fowler	Dallas Cowboys	May 11, 2026	1 year, $5 million
OT	Bobby Hart	Los Angeles Chargers	June 8, 2026	1 year, $1.3 million
CB	Trevon Diggs	Green Bay Packers	August 19, 2026	1 year, $1.22 million
CB	Terrion Arnold	Detroit Lions	August 29, 2026	1 year, $1.08 million

=== Players lost ===
Position	Player	Reason	2026 team	Date
CB	Tyler Hall	Released	Cleveland Browns	March 13, 2026
RB	Cam Akers	Released	TBD	April 27, 2026
RB	Kenny McIntosh	Waived	TBD	July 28, 2026
LB	Ja'Markis Weston	Waived	Carolina Panthers	August 1, 2026

=== Draft ===
2026 Seattle Seahawks draft selections
Round	Selection	Player	Position	College	Notes
1	32	Jadarian Price	RB	Notre Dame	
2	64	Bud Clark	S	TCU	
3	99	Julian Neal	CB	Arkansas	From Steelers
4	132	Traded to the New Orleans Saints			
5	148	Beau Stephens	OG	Iowa	From Browns
5	172	Traded to the New Orleans Saints			
6	199	Emmanuel Henderson	WR	Kansas	From Jets
6	213	Traded to the Jacksonville Jaguars			
6	216	Traded to the Green Bay Packers			
7	236	Andre Fuller	CB	Toledo	From Packers
7	242	Deven Eastern	DT	Minnesota	From Bills via Browns and Jets
7	248	Traded to the Cleveland Browns			
7	255	Michael Dansby	CB	Arizona	From Packers

2026 Seattle Seahawks undrafted free agents
Name	Position	College	Ref.
Michael Briscoe	WR	Cal Poly	
Devean Deal	LB	TCU	
Aidan Hubbard	LB	Northwestern	
Marvin Jones Jr.	LB	Oklahoma	
Lance Mason	TE	Wisconsin	
Uso Seumalo	NT	Kansas State	
Levi Wentz	WR	Kansas	
Rashad Rochelle	WR	Indiana State	
Trayvon Rudolph	WR	Toledo	
Kyre Duplessis	WR	Delaware	
Jordan Washington	CB	Stanford	
Justin Jones	RB	Auburn	

== Staff ==
Seattle Seahawks staff
Front office: Controlling owner – Neeru Khosla; Chair – Vinod Khosla; Vice chair – Neal Khosla; Co-owners – Mark Stevens, Penny Pritzker, Aramburuzabala Family; President – Chuck Arnold; President of football operations/general manager – John Schneider; Vice president of football administration – Joey Laine; Vice president of football finance – William Saguilla; Assistant general manager – Matt Berry; Assistant general manager – Willie Schneider; Director of player personnel – Aaron Hineline; Director of college scouting – Jason Barnes; Director of pro personnel – Armani Perez; Director of football analysis and special situations – Brian Eayrs; VP of research & analytics – Patrick Ward; Head coaches: Head coach – Mike Macdonald; Assistant head coach – Leslie Frazier; Offensive coaches: Offensive coordinator – Brian Fleury; Passing game coordinator/quarterbacks – Jake Peetz; Run game coordinator – Justin Outten; Quarterbacks – Tyson Prince; Senior offensive assistant/running backs – Thomas Hammock; Wide receivers – Frisman Jackson; Tight ends – Mack Brown; Assistant tight ends – Michael Byrne; Senior offensive assistant/offensive line – John Benton; Assistant offensive line – Quinshon Odom; Pass game strategist – Daniel Stern; Offensive assistant – Jimmie Dougherty; Offensive assistant – Johnathan Williams	Defensive coaches: Defensive coordinator – Aden Durde; Defensive run game coordinator – Chris Partridge; Defensive line – Justin Hinds; Outside linebackers – Josh Bynes; Inside linebackers – Zach Orr; Passing game coordinator/defensive backs – Karl Scott; Safeties – Jeff Howard; Senior defensive assistant – Kirk Olivadotti; Defensive assistant/defensive backs – Neiko Thorpe; Defensive assistant – Rob Caprice; Defensive quality control – Keller Chryst; Special teams coaches: Special teams coordinator – Jay Harbaugh; Assistant special teams – Devin Fitzsimmons; Strength and conditioning: Director of player performance and development – Ivan Lewis; Head strength coach – Danny Van Dijk; Associate head strength coach – Mark Philipp; Strength & conditioning assistant – Thomas Garcia; Strength & conditioning assistant – Tim Ojeda; Strength & conditioning assistant – Jamie Yanchar; → Coaching staff → Front office → More NFL staffs

== Current roster ==
Seattle Seahawks roster
Quarterbacks (QB): 14 Sam Darnold; 2 Drew Lock; 6 Jalen Milroe; Running backs (RB): 26 Zach Charbonnet; 36 George Holani; 8 Jadarian Price; 38 Brady Russell FB; 23 Emanuel Wilson; Wide receivers (WR): 85 Irvin Charles; 15 Tory Horton; 10 Cooper Kupp; 22 Rashid Shaheed RS; 11 Jaxon Smith-Njigba; Tight ends (TE): 88 AJ Barner; 89 Nick Kallerup; 81 Eric Saubert	Offensive linemen (OL): 75 Anthony Bradford G; 67 Charles Cross T; 74 Josh Jones G/T; 72 Abraham Lucas T; 53 Quenton Nelson G; 55 Olu Oluwatimi C; 70 Beau Stephens G; 61 Jalen Sundell C; 76 Grey Zabel G; Defensive linemen (DL): 98 Rylie Mills DE; 94 Mike Morris DE; 91 Byron Murphy II DT; 95 Brandon Pili NT; 90 Jarran Reed NT; 99 Leonard Williams DT	Linebackers (LB): 56 Dante Fowler OLB; 58 Derick Hall OLB; 13 Ernest Jones ILB; 48 Tyrice Knight OLB; 0 DeMarcus Lawrence OLB; 7 Uchenna Nwosu OLB; 52 Patrick O'Connell ILB; 57 Connor O'Toole OLB; 44 Chazz Surratt OLB; 32 Drake Thomas OLB; Defensive backs (DB): 3 Nick Emmanwori S; 29 Josh Jobe CB; 20 Julian Love S; 39 Ty Okada S; 28 Nehemiah Pritchett CB; 27 Avery Smith CB; 24 Rodney Thomas II S; 21 Devon Witherspoon CB; Special teams (ST): 4 Michael Dickson P; 5 Jason Myers K; 41 Chris Stoll LS	Practice squad: 69 Cole Brevard DT; 73 Logan Brown T; 37 Michael Dansby CB; 16 Trevon Diggs CB; 97 Deven Eastern NT; 87 Montorie Foster WR; 35 Andre Fuller CB; 68 Bobby Hart T; 84 Emmanuel Henderson WR; 42 Maxen Hook S; 93 Aidan Hubbard LB; 33 Velus Jones Jr. RB; 62 Federico Maranges C (IPP); 50 Jamie Sheriff LB; 49 Ben Sims TE; 66 Cordell Volson G; 86 Ricky White WR; Reserve: 17 Terrion Arnold CB (Exempt); 18 Elijah Arroyo TE (IR); 19 Jake Bobo WR (IR); 9 Bud Clark S (IR); 1 Julian Neal CB (IR); 40 Robbie Ouzts FB (IR); 78 Mason Richman T/G (IR); 31 Jacardia Wright RB (PS/I) 52 active, 16 practice squad (1 IPP), 8 reserve As of November 17, 2026. Rookies in italics.; Roster; Depth chart; Transactions

== Preseason ==
Week	Date	Opponent	Result	Record	Venue	Recap
1	August 15	Dallas Cowboys	L 7–17	0–1	Lumen Field	Recap
2	August 23	at Tennessee Titans	L 16–19	0–2	Nissan Stadium	Recap
3	August 28	at Kansas City Chiefs	T 9–9	0–2–1	Arrowhead Stadium	Recap

== Regular season ==
=== Schedule ===
As the defending champions of Super Bowl LX, the Seahawks earned the right to host the Week 1 NFL Kickoff game, which was televised by NBC. The remainder of the regular season schedule was announced on May 14.

Week	Date	Time (PT)	Opponent	Result	Record	Venue	Network	Recap
1	September 9	5:20 p.m.	New England Patriots	**W** 13–10	1–0	Lumen Field	NBC	Recap
2	September 20	1:25 p.m.	at **Arizona Cardinals**	**W** 31–7	2–0	State Farm Stadium	Fox	Recap
3	September 27	10:00 a.m.	at Washington Commanders	**L** 31–33	2–1	Northwest Stadium	Fox	Recap
4	October 4	1:25 p.m.	Los Angeles Chargers	**W** 30–23	3–1	Lumen Field	CBS	Recap
5	October 11	1:25 p.m.	**San Francisco 49ers**	**L** 29–32	3–2	Lumen Field	Fox	Recap
6	October 15	5:15 p.m.	at Denver Broncos	**L** 14–17 (OT)	3–3	Empower Field at Mile High	Prime Video	Recap
7	October 25	5:20 p.m.	Kansas City Chiefs	**W** 20–3	4–3	Lumen Field	NBC	Recap
8	November 2	5:15 p.m.	Chicago Bears	**L** 17–34	4–4	Lumen Field	ESPN	Recap
9	November 8	1:25 p.m.	**Arizona Cardinals**	**W** 17–3	5–4	Lumen Field	Fox	Recap
10	November 15	1:05 p.m.	at Las Vegas Raiders	**W** 21–13	6–4	Allegiant Stadium	CBS	Recap
11	Bye							
12	November 29	1:25 p.m.	at **San Francisco 49ers**			Levi's Stadium	Fox	
13	December 7	5:15 p.m.	Dallas Cowboys			Lumen Field	ESPN/ABC	
14	December 13	1:25 p.m.	New York Giants			Lumen Field	Fox	
15	December 19	2:00 p.m.	at Philadelphia Eagles			Lincoln Financial Field	Fox	
16	December 25	5:15 p.m.	**Los Angeles Rams**			Lumen Field	Fox	
17	January 3	10:00 a.m.	at Carolina Panthers			Bank of America Stadium	Fox	
18	January 9/10	TBD	at **Los Angeles Rams**			SoFi Stadium	TBD	

Notes

- Intra-division opponents are in **bold** text.
- Networks, dates and times from Weeks 13–17 are subject to change as a result of flexible scheduling; games in Weeks 15 and 16 are exempt.
- The date, time and network for Week 18 will be finalized at the end of Week 17.

=== Game summaries ===
==== Week 1: vs. New England Patriots ====
NFL Kickoff

Week 1: New England Patriots at Seattle Seahawks – Game summary

Quarter	1	2	3	4	Total
Patriots	0	7	3	0	**10**
**Seahawks**	0	0	3	10	**13**

at Lumen Field, Seattle, Washington

- Date: September 9
- Game time: 5:20 p.m. PDT
- Game weather: Sunny, 74 °F (23 °C)
- Game attendance: 68,744
- Referee: Adrian Hill
- TV announcers (NBC): Mike Tirico, Cris Collinsworth, Melissa Stark, and Kaylee Hartung
- Recap, Game Book

Game information

**First quarter**

- No scoring plays

**Second quarter**

- NE – Eli Raridon 2-yard pass from Drake Maye (Andy Borregales kick), 9:11. Patriots 7–0. **Drive: 10 plays, 77 yards, 5:37.**

**Third quarter**

- NE – Andy Borregales 50-yard field goal, 11:49. Patriots 10–0. **Drive: 8 plays, 39 yards, 3:11.**
- SEA – Jason Myers 30-yard field goal, 3:13. Patriots 10–3. **Drive: 7 plays, 31 yards, 3:40.**

**Fourth quarter**

- SEA – Jaxon Smith-Njigba 45-yard pass from Drew Lock (Jason Myers kick), 11:28. Tied 10–10. **Drive: 5 plays, 67 yards, 2:44.**
- SEA – Jason Myers 26-yard field goal, 5:50. Seahawks 13–10. **Drive: 8 plays, 39 yards, 3:30.**

**Top passers**

- NE – Drake Maye – 23/33, 178 yards, TD, 3 INT
- SEA – Drew Lock – 16/22, 187 yards, TD

**Top rushers**

- NE – Rhamondre Stevenson – 18 rushes, 51 yards
- SEA – Jadarian Price – 10 rushes, 52 yards

**Top receivers**

- NE – Mack Hollins – 4 receptions, 51 yards
- SEA – Jaxon Smith-Njigba – 8 receptions, 122 yards, TD

This game was a rematch of Super Bowl LX and was the first NFL Kickoff game to be a Super Bowl rematch since 2016. The Seahawks earned their fifth straight win over the Patriots since their Super Bowl XLIX loss to them.

==== Week 2: at Arizona Cardinals ====
Week 2: Seattle Seahawks at Arizona Cardinals – Game summary

Quarter	1	2	3	4	Total
**Seahawks**	7	0	10	14	**31**
Cardinals	0	7	0	0	**7**

at State Farm Stadium, Glendale, Arizona

- Date: September 20
- Game time: 1:25 p.m. MST & PDT
- Game weather: None (retractable roof closed)
- Game attendance: 63,191
- Referee: Alan Eck
- TV announcers (Fox): Chris Myers, Mark Schlereth and Jen Hale
- Recap, Game Book

Game information

**First quarter**

- SEA – Jaxon Smith-Njigba 82-yard pass from Drew Lock (Jason Myers kick), 12:25. Seahawks 7–0. **Drive: 2 plays, 86 yards, 0:54.**

**Second quarter**

- ARI – Trey McBride 2-yard pass from Jacoby Brissett (Chad Ryland kick), 14:57. Tied 7–7. **Drive: 12 plays, 61 yards, 6:19.**

**Third quarter**

- SEA – Jaxon Smith-Njigba 7-yard pass from Drew Lock (Jason Myers kick), 12:27. Seahawks 14–7. **Drive: 4 plays, 37 yards, 2:33.**
- SEA – Jason Myers 33-yard field goal, 6:47. Seahawks 17–7. **Drive: 8 plays, 29 yards, 4:46.**

**Fourth quarter**

- SEA – Jaxon Smith-Njigba 12-yard pass from Drew Lock (Jason Myers kick), 12:40. Seahawks 24–7. **Drive: 10 plays, 80 yards, 5:33.**
- SEA – AJ Barner 1-yard run (Jason Myers kick), 1:11. Seahawks 31–7. **Drive: 16 plays, 70 yards, 10:14.**

**Top passers**

- SEA – Drew Lock – 19/26, 235 yards, 3 TD
- ARI – Jacoby Brissett – 17/28, 95 yards, TD, INT

**Top rushers**

- SEA – Emanuel Wilson – 21 rushes, 92 yards
- ARI – Jeremiyah Love – 9 rushes, 29 yards

**Top receivers**

- SEA – Jaxon Smith-Njigba – 9 receptions, 155 yards, 3 TD
- ARI – Trey McBride – 8 receptions, 41 yards, TD

This marked the Seahawks' 10th straight win over the Cardinals since 2021.

==== Week 3: at Washington Commanders ====
Week 3: Seattle Seahawks at Washington Commanders – Game summary

Quarter	1	2	3	4	Total
Seahawks	0	10	7	14	**31**
**Commanders**	7	10	7	9	**33**

at Northwest Stadium, Landover, Maryland

- Date: September 27
- Game time: 1:00 p.m. EDT/10:00 a.m. PDT
- Game weather: Rain, 63 °F (17 °C)
- Game attendance: 64,027
- Referee: Carl Cheffers
- TV announcers (Fox): Joe Davis, Greg Olsen and Pam Oliver
- Recap, Game Book

Game information

**First quarter**

- WSH – Rachaad White 6-yard pass from Marcus Mariota (Drew Stevens kick), 9:08. Commanders 7–0. **Drive: 4 plays, 21 yards, 1:52.**

**Second quarter**

- SEA – Jaxon Smith-Njigba 1-yard pass from Sam Darnold (Jason Myers kick), 13:27. Tied 7–7. **Drive: 9 plays, 90 yards, 4:58.**
- WSH – Treylon Burks 11-yard pass from Marcus Mariota (Drew Stevens kick), 6:47. Commanders 14–7. **Drive: 8 plays, 60 yards, 3:34.**
- SEA – Jason Myers 57-yard field goal, 0:52. Commanders 14–10. **Drive: 4 plays, 2 yards, 0:21.**
- WSH – Drew Stevens 57-yard field goal, 0:00. Commanders 17–10. **Drive: 5 plays, 26 yards, 0:52.**

**Third quarter**

- WSH – Terry McLaurin 30-yard pass from Marcus Mariota (Drew Stevens kick), 10:43. Commanders 24–10. **Drive: 3 plays, 43 yards, 1:19.**
- SEA – Eric Saubert 13-yard pass from Sam Darnold (Jason Myers kick), 6:05. Commanders 24–17. **Drive: 8 plays, 60 yards, 4:38.**

**Fourth quarter**

- SEA – Jaxon Smith-Njigba 11-yard pass from Sam Darnold (Jason Myers kick), 11:53. Tied 24–24. **Drive: 7 plays, 80 yards, 4:19.**
- WSH – Drew Stevens 36-yard field goal, 4:34. Commanders 27–24. **Drive: 12 plays, 42 yards, 7:19.**
- WSH – Kain Medrano 50-yard interception return (kick failed), 3:57. Commanders 33–24.
- SEA – Cooper Kupp 7-yard pass from Sam Darnold (Jason Myers kick), 2:51. Commanders 33–31. **Drive: 5 plays, 68 yards, 1:06.**

**Top passers**

- SEA – Sam Darnold – 31/45, 379 yards, 4 TD, 2 INT
- WSH – Marcus Mariota – 19/31, 183 yards, 3 TD

**Top rushers**

- SEA – Jadarian Price – 5 rushes, 15 yards
- WSH – Jacory Croskey-Merritt – 19 rushes, 36 yards

**Top receivers**

- SEA – Jaxon Smith-Njigba – 10 receptions, 128 yards, 2 TD
- WSH – Terry McLaurin – 6 receptions, 77 yards, TD

The Seahawks entered the game as 7.5-point favorites. Sam Darnold made his return, throwing for 379 yards and four touchdowns, but also threw two interceptions, including a critical pick-six to Commanders linebacker Kain Medrano that was returned for 50 yards. This marked the Seahawks' first upset loss since Week 11 of the previous season (snapping a 12-game win streak, including Super Bowl LX).

==== Week 4: vs. Los Angeles Chargers ====
Week 4: Los Angeles Chargers at Seattle Seahawks – Game summary

Quarter	1	2	3	4	Total
Chargers	3	3	7	10	**23**
**Seahawks**	7	13	10	0	**30**

at Lumen Field, Seattle, Washington

- Date: October 4
- Game time: 1:25 p.m. PDT
- Game weather: Cloudy, 63 °F (17 °C)
- Game attendance: 68,691
- Referee: Scott Novak
- TV announcers (CBS): Andrew Catalon, Logan Ryan and AJ Ross
- Recap, Game Book

Game information

**First quarter**

- LAC – Cameron Dicker 40-yard field goal, 11:54. Chargers 3–0. **Drive: 8 plays, 30 yards, 2:44.**
- SEA – Emanuel Wilson 23-yard pass from Sam Darnold (Jason Myers kick), 9:55. Seahawks 7–3. **Drive: 1 play, 23 yards, 0:08.**

**Second quarter**

- SEA – Rashid Shaheed 28-yard run (kick failed), 6:12. Seahawks 13–3. **Drive: 7 plays, 65 yards, 4:11.**
- SEA – Emanuel Wilson 8-yard run (Jason Myers kick), 0:43. Seahawks 20–3. **Drive: 2 plays, 20 yards, 0:37.**
- LAC – Cameron Dicker 39-yard field goal, 0:00. Seahawks 20–6. **Drive: 5 plays, 45 yards, 0:43.**

**Third quarter**

- SEA – Tory Horton 6-yard pass from Sam Darnold (Jason Myers kick), 10:23. Seahawks 27–6. **Drive: 8 plays, 68 yards, 4:37.**
- LAC – Kimani Vidal 9-yard pass from Justin Herbert (Cameron Dicker kick), 4:53. Seahawks 27–13. **Drive: 11 plays, 81 yards, 5:30.**
- SEA – Jason Myers 35-yard field goal, 1:19. Seahawks 30–13. **Drive: 9 plays, 52 yards, 3:34.**

**Fourth quarter'**

- LAC – Omarion Hampton 2-yard run (Cameron Dicker kick), 7:48. Seahawks 30–20. **Drive: 16 plays, 85 yards, 8:31.**
- LAC – Cameron Dicker 36-yard field goal, 2:14. Seahawks 30–23. **Drive: 8 plays, 74 yards, 1:47.**

**Top passers**

- LAC – Justin Herbert – 19/31, 189 yards, TD, 2 INT
- SEA – Sam Darnold – 13/22, 168 yards, 2 TD, INT

**Top rushers**

- LAC – Omarion Hampton – 9 rushes, 45 yards, TD
- SEA – Emanuel Wilson – 21 rushes, 81 yards, TD

**Top receivers**

- LAC – Tre Harris – 3 receptions, 60 yards
- SEA – Jaxon Smith-Njigba – 5 receptions, 76 yards

==== Week 5: vs. San Francisco 49ers ====
Week 5: San Francisco 49ers at Seattle Seahawks – Game summary

Quarter	1	2	3	4	Total
**49ers**	7	14	0	11	**32**
Seahawks	7	6	13	3	**29**

at Lumen Field, Seattle, Washington

- Date: October 11
- Game time: 1:25 p.m. PDT
- Game weather: Sunny, 58 °F (14 °C)
- Game attendance: 68,664
- Referee: Land Clark
- TV announcers (Fox): Kevin Burkhardt, Tom Brady, Erin Andrews and Tom Rinaldi
- Recap, Game Book

Game information

**First quarter**

- SF – Mike Evans 2-yard pass from Brock Purdy (Eddy Pineiro kick), 11:12. 49ers 7–0. **Drive: 4 plays, 18 yards, 1:23.**
- SEA – Emanuel Wilson 2-yard run (Jason Myers kick), 5:43. Tied 7–7. **Drive: 6 plays, 24 yards, 3:40.**

**Second quarter**

- SEA – Jason Myers 49-yard field goal, 13:27. Seahawks 10–7. **Drive: 7 plays, 61 yards, 2:12.**
- SF – Christian McCaffrey 11-yard run (Eddy Pineiro kick), 8:17. 49ers 14–10. **Drive: 1 play, 11 yards, 0:05.**
- SEA – Jason Myers 50-yard field goal, 1:56. 49ers 14–13. **Drive: 11 plays, 35 yards, 6:21.**
- SF – Gracen Halton fumble recovery in end zone (Eddy Pineiro kick), 0:13. 49ers 21–13.

**Third quarter**

- SEA – Jason Myers 43-yard field goal, 8:56. 49ers 21–16. **Drive: 8 plays, 33 yards, 4:15.**
- SEA – Jaxon Smith-Njigba 16-yard pass from Sam Darnold (Jason Myers kick), 5:52. Seahawks 23–21. **Drive: 3 plays, 23 yards, 1:24.**
- SEA – Jason Myers 48-yard field goal, 3:02. Seahawks 21–26. **Drive: 4 plays, 6 yards, 1:59.**

**Fourth quarter**

- SF – Brandin Cooks 7-yard pass from Brock Purdy (Mike Evans–Brock Purdy pass), 11:02. 49ers 29–26. **Drive: 12 plays, 74 yards, 7:00.**
- SEA – Jason Myers 40-yard field goal, 6:55. Tied 29–29. **Drive: 7 plays, 33 yards, 4:07.**
- SF – Eddy Pineiro 40-yard field goal, 1:56. 49ers 32–29. **Drive: 8 plays, 43 yards, 4:59.**

**Top passers**

- SF – Brock Purdy – 19/29, 189 yards, 2 TD, INT
- SEA – Sam Darnold – 18/29, 295 yards, TD, 2 INT

**Top rushers**

- SF – Christian McCaffrey – 11 rushes, 68 yards, TD
- SEA – Emanuel Wilson – 20 rushes, 61 yards, TD

**Top receivers**

- SF – Mike Evans – 7 receptions, 113 yards, TD
- SEA – Jaxon Smith-Njigba – 5 receptions, 102 yards, TD

==== Week 6: at Denver Broncos ====
Week 6: Seattle Seahawks at Denver Broncos – Game summary

Quarter	1	2	3	4	OT	Total
Seahawks	3	0	0	11	0	**14**
**Broncos**	0	14	0	0	3	**17**

at Empower Field at Mile High, Denver, Colorado

- Date: October 15
- Game time: 6:15 p.m. MDT/5:15 p.m. PDT
- Game weather: Clear, 53 °F (12 °C)
- Game attendance: 76,973
- Referee: Brad Rogers
- TV announcers (Prime Video): Al Michaels, Kirk Herbstreit and Kaylee Hartung
  Game simulcast on KCPQ and KMGH.
- Recap, Game Book

Game information

**First quarter**

- SEA – Jason Myers 55-yard field goal, 6:31. Seahawks 3–0. **Drive: 6 plays, 18 yards, 1:58.**

**Second quarter**

- DEN – J. K. Dobbins 4-yard run (Wil Lutz kick), 12:52. Broncos 7–3. **Drive: 16 plays, 74 yards, 8:39.**
- DEN – RJ Harvey 1-yard run (Wil Lutz kick), 5:15. Broncos 14–3. **Drive: 9 plays, 79 yards, 4:32.**

**Third quarter**

- No scoring plays

**Fourth quarter**

- SEA – George Holani 1-yard run (Sam Darnold–Rashid Shaheed pass), 5:41. Broncos 14–11. **Drive: 11 plays, 67 yards, 3:37.**
- SEA – Jason Myers 34-yard field goal, 0:03. Tied 14–14. **Drive: 8 plays, 38 yards, 0:54.**

**Overtime**

- DEN – Wil Lutz 53-yard field goal, 4:53. Broncos 17–14. **Drive: 4 plays, 8 yards, 2:18.**

**Top passers**

- SEA – Sam Darnold – 27/51, 278 yards, 2 INT
- DEN – Bo Nix – 17/27, 107 yards

**Top rushers**

- SEA – Emanuel Wilson – 14 rushes, 52 yards
- DEN – J. K. Dobbins – 17 rushes, 41 yards, TD

**Top receivers**

- SEA – Jaxon Smith-Njigba – 12 receptions, 134 yards
- DEN – RJ Harvey – 3 receptions, 31 yards

The Seahawks fell behind 14–3, but managed to rally for overtime after Jason Myers' 34-yard field goal tied it with 3 seconds left in regulation. In overtime, Sam Darnold threw a costly interception to Broncos cornerback Kris Abrams-Draine, which would set up a 53-yard game-winning field goal by placekicker Wil Lutz to seal the game.

This marked the Seahawks' first loss to the Broncos since 2018, and Sam Darnold dropped his career record against Denver to 0–4. It was also the team's first back-to-back loss since Week 16 of 2024.

==== Week 7: vs. Kansas City Chiefs ====
Week 7: Kansas City Chiefs at Seattle Seahawks – Game summary

Quarter	1	2	3	4	Total
Chiefs	0	0	3	0	**3**
**Seahawks**	0	10	3	7	**20**

at Lumen Field, Seattle, Washington

- Date: October 25
- Game time: 5:20 p.m. PDT
- Game weather: Cloudy, 55 °F (13 °C)
- Game attendance: 68,740
- Referee: John Hussey
- TV announcers (NBC): Mike Tirico, Cris Collinsworth and Melissa Stark
- Recap, Game Book

Game information

**First quarter**

- No scoring plays

**Second quarter**

- SEA – Jason Myers 25-yard field goal, 8:22. Seahawks 3–0. **Drive: 15 plays, 86 yards, 8:26.**
- SEA – Jaxon Smith-Njigba 28-yard pass from Sam Darnold (Jason Myers kick), 1:44. Seahawks 10–0. **Drive: 10 plays, 66 yards, 4:16.**

**Third quarter**

- SEA – Jason Myers 35-yard field goal, 8:09. Seahawks 13–0. **Drive: 13 plays, 57 yards, 6:51.**
- KC – Harrison Butker 50=yard field goal, 1:42. Seahawks 13–3. **Drive: 13 plays, 44 yards, 6:27.**

**Fourth quarter**

- SEA – Emanuel Wilson 21-yard run (Jason Myers kick), 3:47. Seahawks 20–3. **Drive: 9 plays, 65 yards, 4:46.**

**Top passers**

- KC – Patrick Mahomes – 19/33, 165 yards, INT
- SEA – Sam Darnold – 20/28, 257 yards, TD, INT

**Top rushers**

- KC – Kenneth Walker III – 14 rushes, 36 yards
- SEA – Emanuel Wilson – 24 rushes, 100 yards, TD

**Top receivers**

- KC – Travis Kelce – 4 receptions, 44 yards
- SEA – Jaxon Smith-Njigba – 9 receptions, 150 yards, TD

==== Week 8: vs. Chicago Bears ====
Week 8: Chicago Bears at Seattle Seahawks – Game summary

Quarter	1	2	3	4	Total
**Bears**	7	6	7	14	**34**
Seahawks	0	9	0	8	**17**

at Lumen Field, Seattle, Washingto

- Date: November 2
- Game time: 5:15 p.m. PST
- Game weather: Cloudy, 49 °F (9 °C)
- Game attendance: 190,639
- Referee: Shawn Smith
- TV announcers (ESPN/KCPQ/WCIU): Joe Buck, Troy Aikman, Lisa Salters, and Laura Rutledge
- Recap, Game Book

Game information

**First quarter**

- CHI – Luther Burden III 1-yard pass from Caleb Williams (Cairo Santos kick), 5:25. Bears 7–0. **Drive: 17 plays, 80 yards, 8:32.**

**Second quarter**

- SEA – Jason Myers 27-yard field goal, 12:50. Bears 7–3. **Drive: 7 plays, 45 yards, 3:51.**
- CHI – Cairo Santos 44-yard field goal, 6:07. Bears 10–3. **Drive: 7 plays, 47 yards, 3:27.**
- CHI – Cairo Santos 38-yard field goal, 1:08. Bears 13–3. **Drive: 8 plays, 55 yards, 3:40.**
- SEA – Jaxon Smith-Njigba 43-yard pass from Sam Darnold (kick failed), 0:30. Bears 13–9. **Drive: 5 plays, 71 yards, 0:38.**

**Third quarter**

- CHI – D'Andre Swift 1-yard run (Cairo Santos kick), 5:38. Bears 20–9. **Drive: 10 plays, 69 yards, 6:19.**

**Fourth quarter**

- SEA – Cooper Kupp 7-yard pass from Sam Darnold (Sam Darnold-Tory Horton pass), 11:46. Bears 20–17. **Drive: 3 plays, 25 yards, 1:20.**
- CHI – D'Andre Swift 5-yard run (Cairo Santos kick), 8:28. Bears 27–17. **Drive: 6 plays, 56 yards, 3:18.**
- CHI – D'Andre Swift 5-yard run (Cairo Santos kick), 4:41. Bears 34–17. **Drive: 4 plays, 6 yards, 1:11.**

**Top passers**

- CHI – Caleb Williams – 24/34, 247 yards, TD
- SEA – Sam Darnold – 17/34, 188 yards, 2 TD, INT

**Top rushers**

- CHI – D'Andre Swift – 27 rushes, 60 yards, 3 TD
- SEA – Jadarian Price – 10 rushes, 29 yards

**Top receivers**

- CHI – Rome Odunze – 4 receptions, 87 yards
- SEA – Jaxon Smith-Njigba – 6 receptions, 118 yards, TD

==== Week 9: vs. Arizona Cardinals ====
Week 9: Arizona Cardinals at Seattle Seahawks – Game summary

Quarter	1	2	3	4	Total
Cardinals	3	0	0	0	**3**
**Seahawks**	0	14	3	0	**17**

at Lumen Field, Seattle, Washington

- Date: November 8
- Game time: 1:25 p.m. PST
- Game weather: Cloudy, 56 °F (13 °C)
- Game attendance: 68,636
- Referee: Clete Blakeman
- TV announcers (Fox): Kenny Albert, Jonathan Vilma and Megan Olivi
- Recap, Game Book

Game information

**First quarter**

- ARI – Chad Ryland 28-yard field goal, 9:23. Cardinals 3–0. **Drive: 10 plays, 89 yards, 4:52.**

**Second quarter**

- SEA – AJ Barner 1-yard run (Jason Myers kick), 14:23. Seahawks 7–3. **Drive: 11 plays, 58 yards, 5:17.**
- SEA – AJ Barner 7-yard pass from Drew Lock (Jason Myers kick), 0:15. Seahawks 14–3. **Drive: 7 plays, 81 yards, 1:30.**

**Third quarter**

- SEA – Jason Myers 45-yard field goal, 3:50. Seahawks 17–3. **Drive: 11 plays, 57 yards, 7:35.**

**Fourth quarter**

- No scoring plays

**Top passers**

- ARI – Gardner Minshew – 21/30, 166 yards
- SEA – Drew Lock – 19/28, 175 yards, TD

**Top rushers**

- ARI – Tyler Allgeier – 17 rushes, 46 yards
- SEA – Zach Charbonnet – 16 rushes, 77 yards

**Top receivers**

- ARI – Michael Wilson – 6 receptions, 60 yards
- SEA – Jadarian Price – 4 receptions, 54 yards

==== Week 10: at Las Vegas Raiders ====
Week 10: Seattle Seahawks at Las Vegas Raiders – Game summary

Quarter	1	2	3	4	Total
**Seahawks**	7	0	14	0	**21**
Raiders	7	3	0	3	**13**

at Allegiant Stadium, Paradise, Nevada

- Date: November 15
- Game time: 1:05 p.m. PST
- Game weather: None (indoor stadium)
- Game attendance: 62,624
- Referee: Bill Vinovich
- TV announcers (CBS): Ian Eagle, Ross Tucker and Evan Washburn
- Recap, Game Book

Game information

**First quarter**

- LV – Fernando Mendoza 10-yard run (Matt Gay kick), 7:41. Raiders 7–0. **Drive: 11 plays, 46 yards, 6:21.**
- SEA – Cooper Kupp 34-yard pass from Drew Lock (Jason Myers kick), 2:32. Tied 7–7. **Drive: 8 plays, 73 yards, 5:09.**

**Second quarter**

- LV – Matt Gay 34-yard field goal, 11:13. Raiders 10–7. **Drive: 11 plays, 49 yards, 6:19.**

**Third quarter**

- SEA – Jadarian Price 12-yard run (Jason Myers kick), 9:28. Seahawks 14–10. **Drive: 8 plays, 87 yards, 3:59.**
- SEA – Jaxon Smith-Njigba 71-yard pass from Drew Lock (Jason Myers kick), 7:10. Seahawks 21–10. **Drive: 3 plays, 78 yards, 1:02.**

**Fourth quarter**

- LV – Matt Gay 43-yard field goal, 2:04. Seahawks 21–13. **Drive: 10 plays, 44 yards, 2:18.**

**Top passers**

- SEA – Drew Lock – 14/17, 240 yards, 2 TD
- LV – Fernando Mendoza – 17/29, 143 yards

**Top rushers**

- SEA – Zach Charbonnet – 20 rushes, 94 yards
- LV – Mike Washington Jr. – 8 rushes, 23 yards

**Top receivers**

- SEA – Jaxon Smith-Njigba – 8 receptions, 171 yards, TD
- LV – Ashton Jeanty – 4 receptions, 46 yards

==== Week 12: at San Francisco 49ers ====
Week 12: Seattle Seahawks at San Francisco 49ers – Game summary

Quarter	1	2	3	4	Total
Seahawks	0	0	0	0	**0**
49ers	0	0	0	0	**0**

at Levi's Stadium, Santa Clara, California

- Date: November 29
- Game time: 1:25 p.m. PST
- TV announcers (Fox): Kevin Burkhardt, Tom Brady, Erin Andrews and Tom Rinaldi
- Preview

=== Standings ===
==== Division ====
NFC West
	W	L	T	PCT	DIV	CONF	PF	PA	STK
San Francisco 49ers	8	1	0	.889	3–0	5–1	281	196	W2
Seattle Seahawks	6	4	0	.600	2–1	2–3	223	175	W2
Los Angeles Rams	6	4	0	.600	1–2	4–2	248	187	W4
Arizona Cardinals	3	7	0	.300	1–4	2–6	184	289	L2

==== Conference ====
NFC
Seed	Team	Division	W	L	T	PCT	DIV	CONF	SOS	SOV	STK
**Division leaders**
1	San Francisco 49ers	West	8	1	0	.889	3–0	5–1	.431	.448	W2
2 (Note: Detroit wins tie break over Minnesota and Chicago based on head-to-head record.)	Detroit Lions	North	7	2	0	.778	2–0	4–1	.459	.403	W5
3	New York Giants	East	5	3	1	.611	2–1–1	3–3–1	.345	.277	L1
4	Carolina Panthers	South	4	5	0	.444	2–1	4–3	.524	.405	W1
**Wild cards**
5 (Note: Minnesota wins tie break over Chicago based on head-to-head victory.)	Minnesota Vikings	North	7	2	0	.778	3–1	5–1	.524	.439	W1
6	Chicago Bears	North	7	2	0	.778	0–2	5–2	.442	.373	W4
7 (Note: Green Bay wins tie break over Seattle based on conference record. Division tie break was initially used to eliminate LA Rams (see below).)	Green Bay Packers	North	6	4	0	.600	1–3	4–4	.521	.439	L1
**In the hunt**
8 (Note: Seattle wins tie break over LA Rams based on division record.)	Seattle Seahawks	West	6	4	0	.600	2–1	2–3	.516	.397	W2
9	Los Angeles Rams	West	6	4	0	.600	1–2	4–2	.484	.339	W4
10	Dallas Cowboys	East	4	6	0	.400	2–1	2–5	.436	.311	L1
11	Washington Commanders	East	3	5	1	.389	2–2–1	3–4–1	.494	.482	W1
12 (Note: Tampa Bay wins tie break over New Orleans based on division record.)	Tampa Bay Buccaneers	South	3	6	0	.333	2–0	3–3	.588	.379	L1
13	New Orleans Saints	South	3	6	0	.333	0–2	1–4	.547	.534	L1
14 (Note: Atlanta wins tie break over Arizona based on conference record.)	Atlanta Falcons	South	3	7	0	.300	1–2	3–3	.598	.607	L3
15	Arizona Cardinals	West	3	7	0	.300	1–4	2–6	.595	.379	L2
16	Philadelphia Eagles	East	2	7	0	.222	1–3	1–6	.500	.250	L7
