= Justin Outten =

American football coach (born 1983)

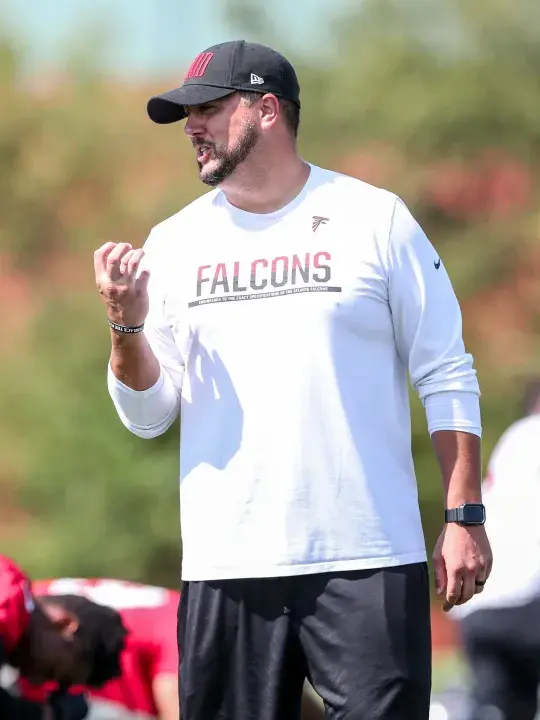
- Outten in 2019

Seattle Seahawks
- Title: Run game coordinator

Personal information
- Born: October 26, 1983 (age 43); Doylestown, Pennsylvania, U.S.

Career information
- Position: Center
- High school: Central Bucks West (Doylestown, Pennsylvania)
- College: Syracuse

Career history
- Syracuse (2007) Graduate assistant; Westfield HS (TX) (2008–2015) Assistant head coach, offensive coordinator & offensive line coach; Atlanta Falcons (2016–2018); Coaching intern (2016); Offensive assistant (2017-2018); Green Bay Packers (2019–2021) Tight ends coach; Denver Broncos (2022) Offensive coordinator; Tennessee Titans (2023–2024); Running backs coach & run game coordinator (2023); Tight ends coach (2024); Seattle Seahawks (2025–present); Run game specialist & assistant offensive line coach (2025–2026); Run game coordinator (2026–present)

Awards and highlights
- Super Bowl champion (LX)
- Coaching profile at Pro Football Reference

Justin Outten (born October 26, 1983) is an American professional football coach who currently serves as the run game specialist for the Seattle Seahawks of the National Football League (NFL). He has previously served an assistant coach for the Atlanta Falcons and Green Bay Packers and was the offensive coordinator for the Denver Broncos in 2022. Outten played college football as a center at Syracuse University.

== Early life ==
A native of Doylestown, Pennsylvania, Outten attended and played high school football as a center at Central Bucks High School West. Outten was a two-year starter at center for the Syracuse Orange during the coaching transition from Paul Pasqualoni to Greg Robinson, from 2003-06.

== Coaching career ==
=== Syracuse ===
In 2007, Outten began his coaching career at his alma mater, Syracuse University, as a graduate assistant.

=== Westfield HS ===
In 2008, Outten was hired to become Offensive Line Coach at Westfield High School in Houston, Texas. He later added titles of assistant head coach and offensive coordinator at the school.

=== Atlanta Falcons ===
In 2016, Outten joined the Atlanta Falcons as a coaching intern. In 2017, he was hired by the Falcons as an offensive assistant under head coach Dan Quinn.

=== Green Bay Packers ===
On January 24, 2019, Outten was hired by the Green Bay Packers as their tight ends coach under head coach Matt LaFleur.

On December 12, 2021, Outten missed the Packers' Week 14 game against the Chicago Bears due to COVID-19 protocols.

=== Denver Broncos ===
On February 2, 2022, Outten was hired by the Denver Broncos as their offensive coordinator under head coach Nathaniel Hackett. In 2022, Denver tied for fifth in the NFL with 35 pass completions of 25 or more yards. Outten took over play-calling for the final two games of the season, and in the Week 18 finale the Broncos gained 471 total yards, their most in a single game since 2016.

=== Tennessee Titans ===
On February 14, 2023, the Tennessee Titans hired Outten as their run game coordinator and running backs coach.

On February 10, 2024, Tennessee announced that they would be retaining Outten and shifting him to the role of tight ends coach. On January 27, 2025, it was announced that Outten and the Titans would be parting ways.

=== Seattle Seahawks ===
On February 13, 2025, the Seattle Seahawks hired Outten as their run game specialist. He was part of the coaching staff that won Super Bowl LX over the New England Patriots, 29–13.

On February 19, 2026, Outten was promoted to become Seattle's run game coordinator.
