= Chuck Arnold (American football) =

American football executive

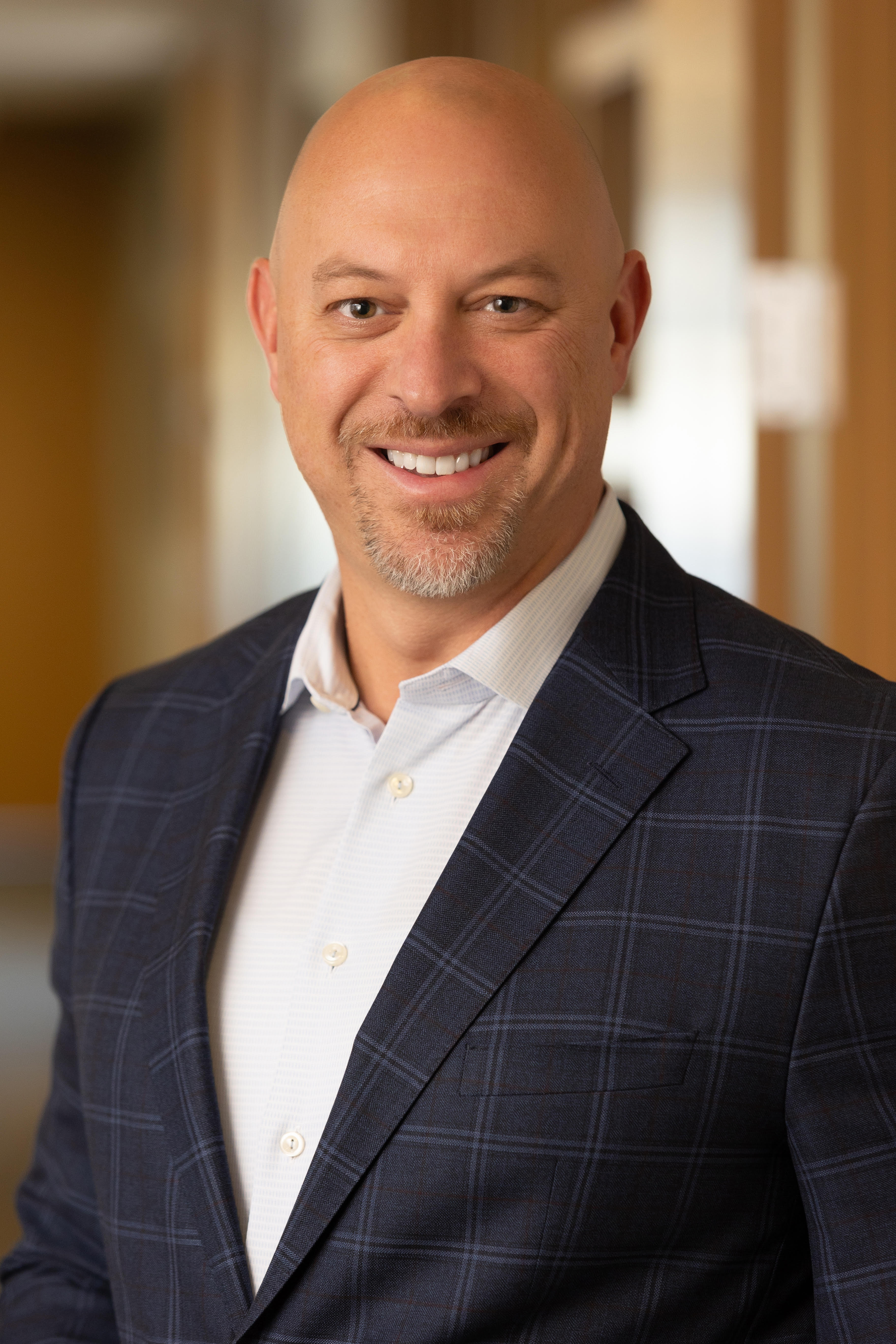
- Born: Charles Arnold; Tacoma, Washington
- Education: Washington State University
- Occupation: American football executive
- Known for: President of the Seattle Seahawks; President of First & Goal Inc
- Spouse: Jana Arnold
- Football career

Career history
- Seattle Seahawks (2010–2013) Vice president, sales and marketing; Seattle Seahawks (2013–2018) Chief operating officer; Seattle Seahawks (2018–present) President

Awards and highlights
- 2× Super Bowl champion (XLVIII, LX)

Chuck Arnold is an American football executive. He is the current president of the Seattle Seahawks of the National Football League (NFL) and First & Goal Inc.

== Early life and education ==
Arnold grew up in Tacoma, Washington and was born at St. Joseph Medical Center. He attended Curtis Senior High School, graduating in 1989. He completed a bachelor's degree in sports management at Washington State University in 1994, where he was a member of the Delta Upsilon Fraternity.

== Professional career ==
In addition to being president of the Seattle Seahawks, Arnold has been the president of First & Goal Inc. since September 2018. In this role, he manages Lumen Field, Lumen Field Event Center, and WaMu Theater.

=== Seattle Seahawks ===
In 1994, Arnold accepted an offer from the Seahawks to begin a community and public relations internship. He went on to work in ticket sales for the Seahawks, becoming their director of ticket operations in 1997. In 2010, he was promoted to vice president of sales in marketing, and then in 2013 to chief operating officer. He was promoted to the president of the team in September 2018, replacing Peter McLoughlin.

In April 2021, Seattle Seahawks team chair Jody Allen extended Arnold's contract as president through the 2027 NFL draft. This extension also applies to his role at First & Goal Inc.

Under Arnold, the Seahawks won Super Bowl LX.

=== Memberships ===
Arnold is a member of the following organizations:

- Director, Virginia Mason Franciscan Health since 2023
- Advisory Board, BDA (Bensussen Deutsch and Associates)
- Member, Boeing Classic Advisory Boards
- Chapter Member, Washington Chapter of the American Cancer Society's CEO's Against Cancer

== Personal life ==
Arnold is married and lives in Sammamish, WA with his wife, Jana, and his two children.

== Recognition ==
- 2026 - Puget Sound Business Journal listed Arnold as one of 15 recipients of their Most Admired CEOs for 2026.
- 2025 - The Seattle Sports Commission awarded Arnold with the 90SSY Sports Leader award.
- 2024 - Puget Sound Business Journal selected Arnold as one of their Directors of the Year.
