= Emanuel Wilson (American football) =

American football player (born 1999)

No. 23 – Seattle Seahawks
- Position: Running back
- Roster status: Active

Personal information
- Born: May 8, 1999 (age 27); Roanoke, Virginia, U.S.
- Listed height: 5 ft 10 in (1.78 m)
- Listed weight: 226 lb (103 kg)

Career information
- High school: North Mecklenburg (Huntersville, North Carolina)
- College: Johnson C. Smith (2018–2019); Fort Valley State (2020–2022)
- NFL draft: 2023: undrafted

Career history
- Denver Broncos (2023)*; Green Bay Packers (2023–2025); Seattle Seahawks (2026–present)
- * Offseason or practice squad member only

Career NFL statistics as of Week 8, 2026
- Rushing yards: 1,486
- Rushing average: 4.2
- Rushing touchdowns: 10
- Receptions: 36
- Receiving yards: 235
- Receiving touchdowns: 2
- Return yards: 233
- Stats at Pro Football Reference

Emanuel Dashae Wilson (born May 8, 1999) is an American professional football running back for the Seattle Seahawks of the National Football League (NFL). He played college football for the Johnson C. Smith Golden Bulls and Fort Valley State Wildcats, and was signed as an undrafted free agent by the Denver Broncos in 2023.

== Early life ==
Wilson was born in Roanoke, Virginia and raised in Charlotte, North Carolina. He played high school football at North Mecklenburg High School in Huntersville, North Carolina.

== College career ==
Wilson attended Johnson C. Smith University where he played college football for the Golden Bulls, redshirting in 2018 and playing his first season in 2019. He transferred to Fort Valley State University in 2020, where he played for the Wildcats through the 2022 season.

=== Statistics ===
Year	Team	Games	Rushing				Receiving			
Year	Team	GP	Att	Yards	Avg	TD	Rec	Yards	Avg	TD
2019	Johnson C. Smith	10	159	1,040	6.5	13	13	86	6.6	0
2021	Fort Valley State	7	147	835	5.7	7	11	91	8.3	0
2022	Fort Valley State	10	209	1,371	6.6	17	24	239	9.9	2
Career		27	515	3,246	6.3	37	48	416	8.7	2

== Professional career ==
Pre-draft measurables
Height	Weight	Arm length	Hand span	Wingspan	40-yard dash	10-yard split	20-yard split	20-yard shuttle	Three-cone drill	Vertical jump	Broad jump
5 ft 10 1/2 in (1.79 m)	226 lb (103 kg)	33 1/4 in (0.84 m)	9 in (0.23 m)	6 ft 7 1/8 in (2.01 m)	4.57 s	1.58 s	2.68 s	4.34 s	7.23 s	36.0 in (0.91 m)	10 ft 0 in (3.05 m)
All values from HBCU Combine/Pro Day

=== Denver Broncos ===
After going unselected in the 2023 NFL draft, Wilson signed as an undrafted free agent with the Denver Broncos on May 12, 2023. The Broncos waived him three days later.

=== Green Bay Packers ===
On May 22, 2023, Wilson signed with the Green Bay Packers. On August 29, the Packers announced that Wilson had made the initial 53-man roster after a strong preseason performance. Wilson made his NFL debut on September 17, in a Week 2 loss to the Atlanta Falcons, recording three carries for five yards. He was placed on injured reserve on November 22. Wilson was activated on January 6, 2024.

Entering 2024 season Wilson was named the backup running back to veteran Josh Jacobs after injuries to A. J. Dillon and rookie MarShawn Lloyd. He played in all 17 games, recording 502 rushing yards and four touchdowns. He returned as the primary backup in 2025, rushing for 496 yards and three touchdowns through 17 games and two starts.

=== Seattle Seahawks ===
On March 13, 2026, Wilson signed a one-year, $2.1 million contract with the Seattle Seahawks.

== NFL career statistics ==
Legend
**Bold**	Career high

=== Regular season ===
Year	Team	Games		Rushing					Receiving					Kick returns					Fumbles	
Year	Team	GP	GS	Att	Yds	Avg	Lng	TD	Rec	Yds	Avg	Lng	TD	Ret	Yds	Avg	Lng	TD	Fum	Lost
2023	GB	7	0	14	85	**6.1**	**31**	0	4	23	**5.8**	9	0	0	0	0.0	0	0	**1**	0
2024	GB	17	0	103	**502**	4.9	21	**4**	11	48	4.4	**30**	**1**	0	0	0.0	0	0	0	0
2025	GB	17	2	**125**	496	4.0	15	3	**15**	**99**	6.6	25	0	**9**	**233**	**25.9**	**33**	0	**1**	0
2026	SEA	8	4	111	403	3.6	21	3	6	65	10.8	23	1	0	0	0.0	0	0	2	0
Total		49	6	353	1,486	4.2	31	10	36	235	6.5	30	2	9	233	25.9	33	0	4	0
Source: pro-football-reference.com

=== Postseason ===
Year	Team	Games		Rushing					Receiving					Fumbles	
Year	Team	GP	GS	Att	Yds	Avg	Lng	TD	Rec	Yds	Avg	Lng	TD	Fum	Lost
2023	GB	2	0	**12**	**36**	**3.0**	**8**	0	**1**	11	11.0	11	0	0	0
2024	GB	1	0	3	6	2.0	4	0	**1**	**23**	**23.0**	**23**	0	0	0
2025	GB	1	0	1	3	**3.0**	3	0	0	0	0.0	0	0	0	0
Total		4	0	16	45	2.8	8	0	2	34	17.0	23	0	0	0
Source: pro-football-reference.com
