= DK Metcalf =

American football player (born 1997)

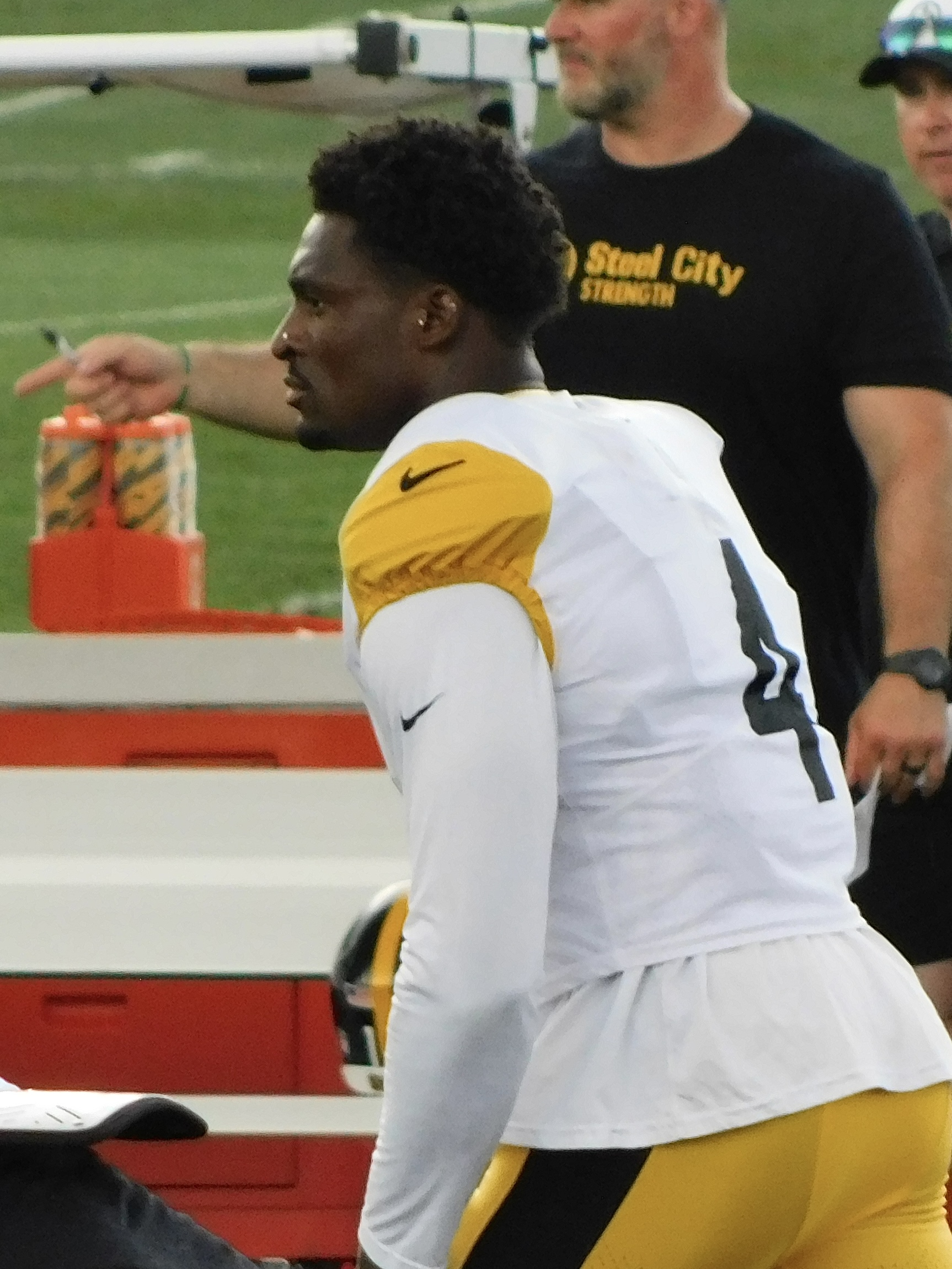
- Metcalf with the Pittsburgh Steelers in 2025

No. 4 – Pittsburgh Steelers
- Position: Wide receiver
- Roster status: Active

Personal information
- Born: December 14, 1997 (age 28); Oxford, Mississippi, U.S.
- Listed height: 6 ft 4 in (1.93 m)
- Listed weight: 228 lb (103 kg)

Career information
- High school: Oxford
- College: Ole Miss (2016–2018)
- NFL draft: 2019: 2nd round, 64th overall pick

Career history
- Seattle Seahawks (2019–2024); Pittsburgh Steelers (2025–present)

Awards and highlights
- Second-team All-Pro (2020); 2× Pro Bowl (2020, 2023); Seattle Seahawks Top 50 players

Career NFL statistics as of Week 10, 2026
- Receptions: 532
- Receiving yards: 7,606
- Receiving touchdowns: 56
- Stats at Pro Football Reference

DeKaylin Zecharius Metcalf (born December 14, 1997) is an American professional football wide receiver for the Pittsburgh Steelers of the National Football League (NFL). He played college football for the Ole Miss Rebels and was selected by the Seattle Seahawks in the second round of the 2019 NFL draft. After six seasons with the Seahawks, Metcalf was traded to the Steelers in 2025. He has one All-Pro selection and has been named to the Pro Bowl twice.

== Early life ==
DeKaylin Zecharius Metcalf was born on December 14, 1997, in Oxford, Mississippi. Metcalf's father, Terrence, also played college football at Ole Miss and was an offensive lineman in the NFL for the Bears, Lions and Saints.

Metcalf attended Oxford High School in Oxford, Mississippi. During his high school football career, he had 224 receptions for 3,302 yards and 49 touchdowns. Regarded as a four-star prospect, Metcalf was ranked the No. 14 wide receiver prospect by Rivals.com. He committed to play college football at the University of Mississippi.

== College career ==
As a freshman at Ole Miss in 2016, Metcalf appeared in the first two games of the season before suffering a foot injury which ended his season. He was granted a redshirt following his injury. He had two receptions for 13 yards with both of the receptions going for touchdowns. In 2017, he had 39 receptions for 646 yards and seven touchdowns. During the 2018 season, Metcalf had 26 receptions for 569 yards before sustaining a season-ending neck injury against Arkansas. After his 2018 season, Metcalf declared for the 2019 NFL draft, forgoing his last two years of college football. He finished his career with 67 receptions for 1,228 yards and 14 touchdowns.

== Professional career ==
Pre-draft measurables
Height	Weight	Arm length	Hand span	Wingspan	40-yard dash	10-yard split	20-yard split	20-yard shuttle	Three-cone drill	Vertical jump	Broad jump	Bench press	Wonderlic
6 ft 3 3/8 in (1.91 m)	228 lb (103 kg)	34 7/8 in (0.89 m)	9 7/8 in (0.25 m)	6 ft 10 7/8 in (2.11 m)	4.33 s	1.45 s	2.53 s	4.39 s	7.23 s	40.5 in (1.03 m)	11 ft 2 in (3.40 m)	27 reps	17
All values from NFL Combine/Pro Day

=== Seattle Seahawks ===
==== 2019 ====
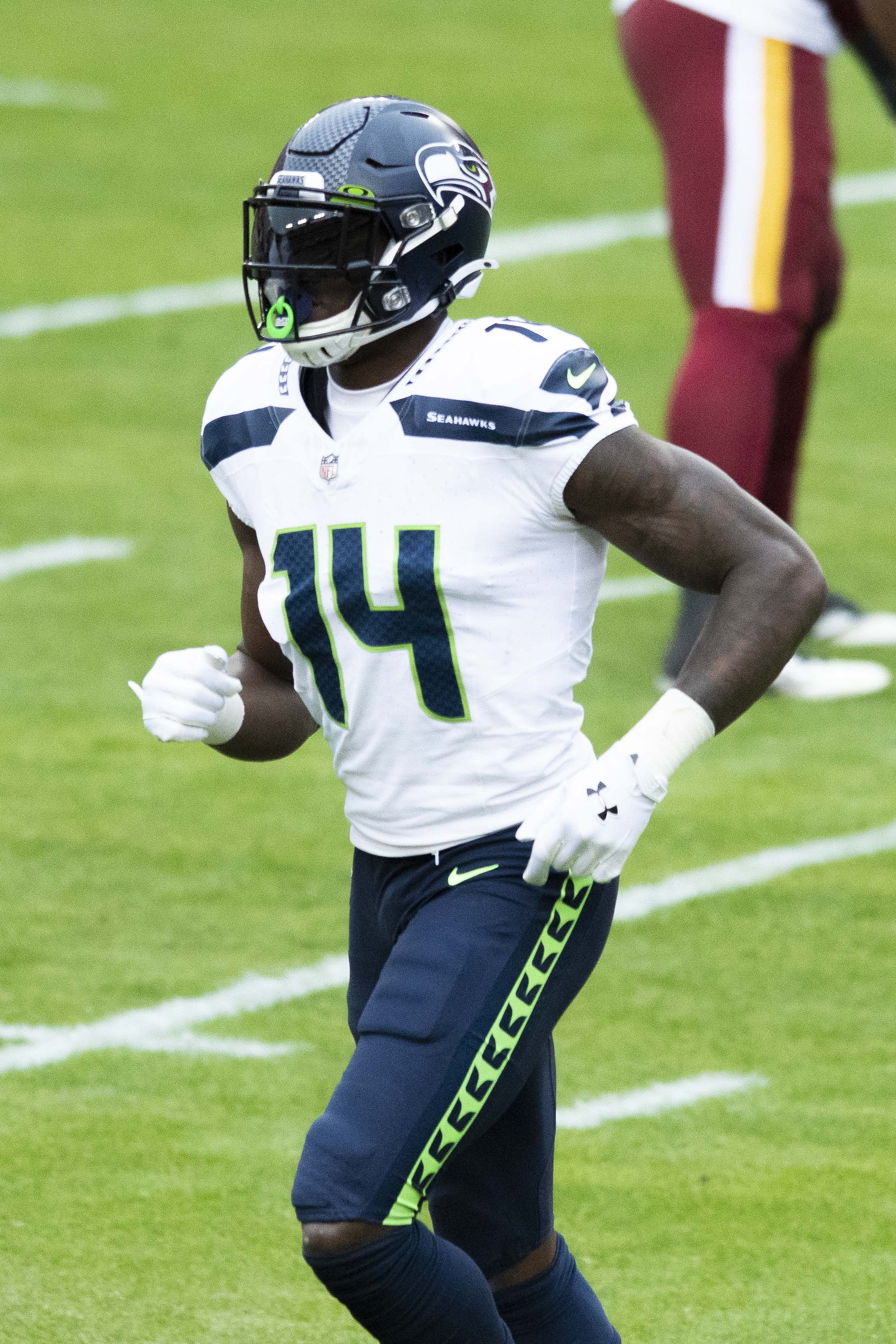
Metcalf with the Seattle Seahawks

Metcalf was selected by the Seattle Seahawks in the second round as the 64th overall pick in the 2019 NFL draft, the ninth of 28 wide receivers. On May 22, 2019, Metcalf signed a four-year deal with the Seahawks worth $4.6 million.

Metcalf played his first regular season game on September 8, 2019, against the Cincinnati Bengals, where he made four receptions for 89 receiving yards as the Seahawks won 21–20. This set a franchise record for total receiving yards by a player making his NFL debut, eclipsing Hall of Famer Steve Largent's previous record of 86 yards. In Week 2 against the Pittsburgh Steelers, Metcalf caught three passes for 61 yards, including his first career touchdown, as the Seahawks won 28–26. In Week 8 against the Atlanta Falcons, Metcalf recorded three catches for 13 yards and two touchdowns in the 27–20 win, Metcalf's first career game with multiple touchdowns. The following week against the Tampa Bay Buccaneers, Metcalf set new career highs in receptions and receiving yards, with six catches for 124 yards, including a 53-yard touchdown in the final minutes of the fourth quarter and a 29-yard catch on 3rd down in overtime that set up a game winning touchdown a few plays later. It was his first career 100-yard game. He also caught a two-point conversion that tied the game at 21 in the third quarter. Metcalf finished the regular season with 900 receiving yards (third among NFL rookies) on 58 receptions with seven receiving touchdowns, second on the team in all three categories to Tyler Lockett. Metcalf was ranked 81st by his fellow players on the NFL Top 100 Players of 2020.

In the Wild Card Round against the Philadelphia Eagles, Metcalf recorded seven catches for 160 yards and a touchdown in the Seahawks' 17–9 victory. This set the NFL record for most receiving yards by a rookie in a playoff game.

==== 2020 ====
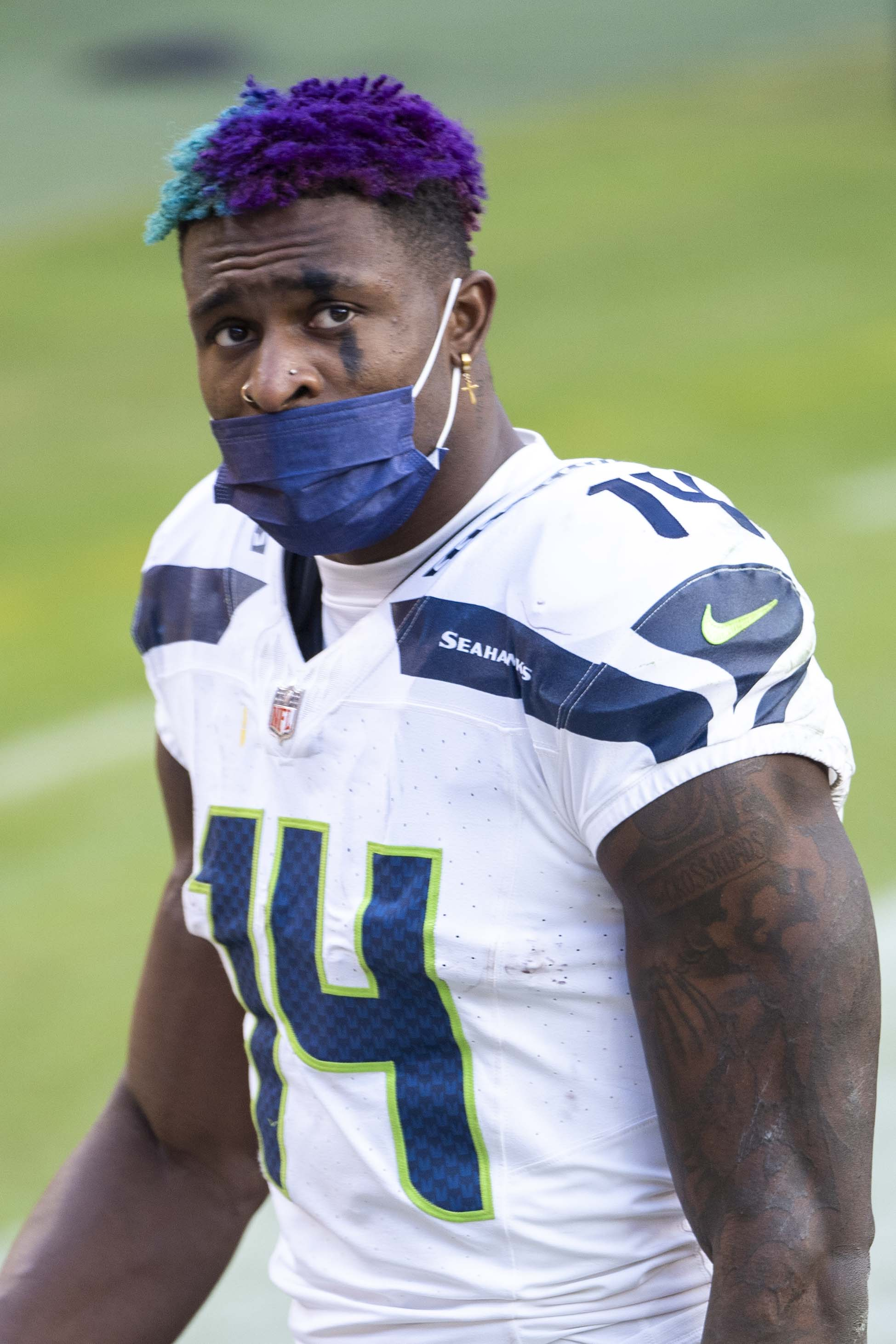
Metcalf prior to a game against the Washington Football Team

In Week 1 against the Falcons, Metcalf caught 4 passes for 95 yards, including a 38-yard touchdown reception, during the 38–25 win. In the following week's game against the New England Patriots, Metcalf caught four passes for 92 yards and a 54-yard touchdown during the 35–30 win.

In the first quarter of the Week 3 game against the Dallas Cowboys, after catching a 61-yard pass, Metcalf slowed to a jog and held the ball out with one hand, seemingly unaware that a defender was behind him. Trevon Diggs knocked the ball free of Metcalf's grasp before he broke the plane of the endzone, and the fumble traveled out of bounds for a touchback. The gaffe was compared to Leon Lett's infamous fumble in Super Bowl XXVII. Despite the blunder, the Seahawks won the game 38–31. Metcalf finished with 110 receiving yards, including the 29-yard game-winning touchdown. In Week 4 against the Miami Dolphins, he had four receptions for 106 yards in the 31–23 victory.

In Week 5 against the Minnesota Vikings on Sunday Night Football, Metcalf recorded six catches for 93 yards and two touchdowns, including the game-winning touchdown reception with 15 seconds left in the game, during the 27–26 win.

In Week 7 against the Arizona Cardinals, Cardinals' safety Budda Baker intercepted a Russell Wilson pass inside the Cardinals' 5-yard-line, and with a clear path ahead and no Seahawk with comparable speed near him, Baker appeared destined for a pick six. However, even though the 195 lb Baker had a 4-yard running head-start halfway across the field, the 229 lb. Metcalf chased down Baker and tackled him at the Seattle 8-yard line, preventing a touchdown. On their ensuing possession, Arizona failed to score, turning the ball over on downs after an incomplete pass from the 3-yard line. Metcalf reached a top speed of 22.64 mph (36.43 km/h), making it the second-fastest in pursuit in the NFL to that point in the season. Ironically, the play was also compared to Leon Lett's Super Bowl XXVII gaffe, yet this time in a far more favorable light. The play was met with awe by fans and athletes alike, and became the basis for a popular meme on social media.

In Week 8 against the San Francisco 49ers, Metcalf caught 12 receptions on 15 targets for 161 yards and two touchdowns, including a 46-yard touchdown catch-and-run during the 37–27 win. In Week 12 against the Philadelphia Eagles on Monday Night Football, he had ten receptions for a career-high 177 receiving yards during the 23–17 win.

Metcalf finished the season with 83 receptions for 1,303 receiving yards and 10 touchdowns. With 1,303 receiving yards, Metcalf set the franchise record for the Seahawks, surpassing Steve Largent's record from 35 years prior. Jaxon Smith-Njigba would surpass this record with his 1,793 yard season in 2025. He was named a second-team All-Pro in 2020 alongside Bobby Wagner and Jamal Adams as the other Seahawk All-Pros.

In the Wild Card Round of the playoffs against the Los Angeles Rams, Metcalf recorded five receptions for 96 yards and two touchdowns, including a 51-yard touchdown reception, during the 30–20 loss.

Metcalf was ranked 22nd on the NFL Top 100 Players of 2021 for his performance during the 2020 season.

==== 2021 ====
Earlier in the year before the start of the NFL season, he participated in the 100 meter part of the USATF Golden Games and Distance Open in Walnut, California. He hoped to qualify for the Olympic trials with this performance. Though he indeed didn't qualify, he had a "respectable" time of 10.37 seconds, beating out 2 of the 17 other competitors.

In Week 3 of the 2021 season, Metcalf hauled in 6 receptions for 107 yards in a 17–30 loss against the Vikings. Two weeks later, he recorded 5 catches and 98 receiving yards for 2 touchdowns against the Seahawks' division rival Rams. Despite his efforts, the Seahawks lost 17–26 in the Thursday Night Football matchup.

In another primetime matchup with Week 7's Sunday Night Football game against the New Orleans Saints, Metcalf caught 2 passes for 96 yards and a touchdown. On one of these catches, Metcalf connected with quarterback Geno Smith for an 84-yard touchdown catch-and-run, with 57 yards coming after the catch. The play was the longest in both Smith and Metcalf's careers. In addition, Metcalf clocked in at a top speed of 21.21 mph, making it the second-fastest play of his career as a ball-carrier. The Seahawks lost the game, 10–13. In the following week's game against the Jacksonville Jaguars, Metcalf finished with 6 receptions for 43 yards and 2 touchdowns as the Seahawks won 31–7.

In the Seahawks’ Week 10 game at Green Bay, Metcalf grabbed the face masks of Green Bay Packers safety Henry Black and cornerback Eric Stokes in a frustrated response to Seattle's inability to score points in the game. He was ejected and tried to enter back into the game, but to no avail. In a shutout, the Seahawks lost 0–17.

In Week 16, Metcalf caught six receptions for 63 yards and a career-high three touchdowns, contributing 18 points in a blowout 51–29 win against the Detroit Lions.

With a final record of 7–10, the Seahawks failed to reach the playoffs for the first time in Metcalf's career. Metcalf finished the season just 33 yards shy of the 1,000 receiving yards mark, with 967 yards. He recorded a total of 75 receptions and 12 touchdowns, the latter of which was a career-high. He led the Seahawks in receptions and receiving touchdowns, while his receiving yards were second to Tyler Lockett. The season was also his last with quarterback Russell Wilson, who was traded to the Denver Broncos the following offseason.

==== 2022 ====
On July 28, 2022, Metcalf and the Seahawks agreed to terms on a three-year, $72 million extension with $58.2 million guaranteed and a $30 million signing bonus. In Week 4, against the Lions, he had seven receptions for 149 receiving yards in the 48–45 victory. In the 2022 season, he finished with 90 receptions for 1,048 yards and six touchdowns. During the Wild Card Round against the 49ers, Metcalf had ten receptions for 136 receiving yards and two touchdowns in a 41–23 loss.

==== 2023 ====
Metcalf and the Seahawks began the 2023 season with an upset loss to the rival Rams at home on September 10. Metcalf emerged as a notable piece in the game's performance as he managed a touchdown during the second quarter to put the Seahawks up 13–7 by the half. Metcalf engaged in a taunting match with the Rams' sideline during the 1st quarter; culminating in him hitting Rams' cornerback Ahkello Witherspoon. Los Angeles head coach Sean McVay was infuriated with the call after he was seen demanding officials to penalize Metcalf, though he was later penalized for taunting. In spite of this; the Seahawks would find themselves shut out the remainder of the game as the Rams went onto win the game 30–13. On November 30, in a Thursday Night Football game against the Dallas Cowboys, Metcalf recorded six receptions for 134 yards and set his career high in touchdown receptions in a single game with three. Despite his efforts, the Seahawks lost 41–35. He finished the 2023 season with 66 receptions for 1,114 yards and eight touchdowns. He was named as a Pro Bowler for the 2023 season. He was ranked 84th by his fellow players on the NFL Top 100 Players of 2024.

==== 2024 ====
In Week 2 against the New England Patriots, Metcalf had ten receptions for 129 yards and a touchdown. After a 71-yard touchdown reception versus the Miami Dolphins in week 3, Metcalf broke the franchise record of most touchdown receptions of at least 50 yards by any Seahawks receiver. He finished the 2024 season with 66 receptions for 992 yards and five touchdowns. Following the season, he requested a trade from the team.

=== Pittsburgh Steelers ===
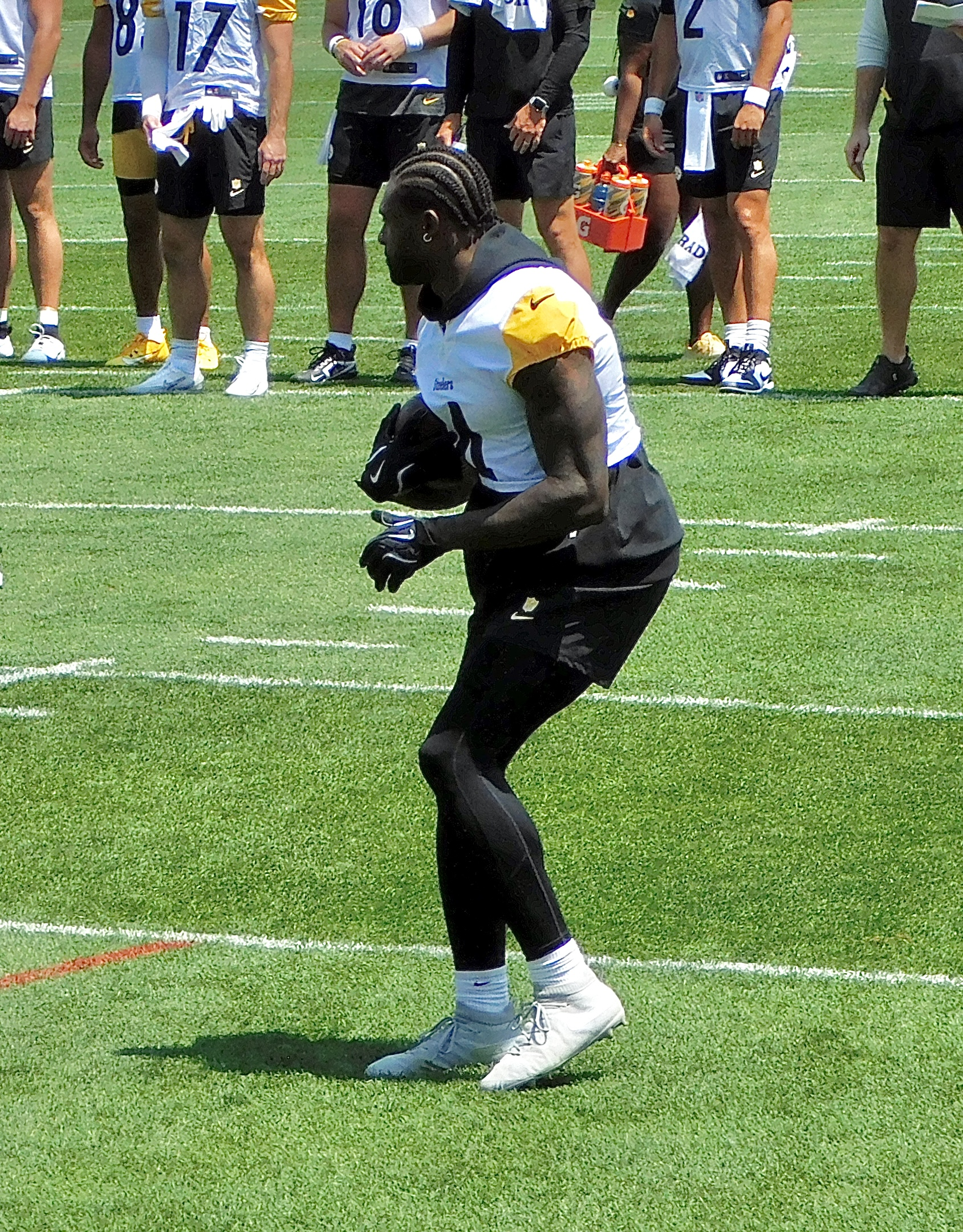
Metcalf with the Steelers in 2025

Metcalf with the Steelers in 2026

On March 9, 2025, multiple outlets reported that the Seahawks had agreed in principle to trade Metcalf to the Pittsburgh Steelers for a second-round pick (No. 52 overall) in the 2025 NFL draft, along with a pick swap in the sixth and seventh rounds. Metcalf also reportedly agreed to a five-year, $150 million extension of his contract. On March 13, the trade was officially announced.

Metcalf made his first start with the Steelers at MetLife Stadium, defeating the New York Jets with a final score of 34–32. During the victory, Metcalf caught four passes on seven targets for 83 yards, making him the team's leading receiver on the afternoon.

On December 21, 2025, during a Week 16 game against the Detroit Lions at Ford Field, Metcalf was involved in an altercation with a fan seated near the sideline. Video footage from the game showed Metcalf grabbing a shirt and engaging in a verbal exchange with the fan before attempting to strike the individual. The incident was not observed by game officials, and no penalty was assessed during the game. Following the game, the NFL and the Pittsburgh Steelers stated that they were reviewing the incident; Metcalf was suspended for the last two games of the regular season. Metcalf appealed, but the NFL denied his appeal and upheld his suspension. He will also forfeit $555,556 in salary and the suspension voids $45 million in future guaranteed money per his contract. However, the Steelers ultimately decided not to void the contract. Metcalf finished the 2025 season with 59 receptions for 850 yards and six touchdowns.

On November 22, 2026, Metcalf was ejected during the third quarter in a game against the Philadelphia Eagles for two unsportsmanlike conduct penalties. It was the third ejection of his career.

== Career statistics ==
Legend
**Bold**	Career high

=== NFL ===
==== Regular season ====
Year	Team	Games		Receiving						Rushing					Fumbles	
Year	Team	GP	GS	Tgt	Rec	Yds	Avg	Lng	TD	Att	Yds	Avg	Lng	TD	Fum	Lost
2019	SEA	16	15	100	58	900	15.5	54	7	**2**	11	5.5	7	0	**3**	**3**
2020	SEA	16	16	129	83	**1,303**	15.7	62	10	0	0	0.0	0	0	1	1
2021	SEA	17	17	129	75	967	12.9	**84**	**12**	1	6	6.0	6	0	1	0
2022	SEA	17	17	**141**	**90**	1,048	11.6	54	6	0	0	0.0	0	0	2	2
2023	SEA	16	16	119	66	1,114	**16.9**	73	8	0	0	0.0	0	0	0	0
2024	SEA	15	12	108	66	992	15.0	71	5	0	0	0.0	0	0	2	2
2025	PIT	15	15	99	59	850	14.4	80	6	**2**	**12**	6.0	6	**1**	0	0
2026	PIT	9	9	70	35	432	12.3	51	2	1	11	**11.0**	**11**	0	1	0
Career		121	117	895	532	7,606	14.3	84	56	6	40	6.7	11	1	10	8

==== Postseason ====
Year	Team	Games		Receiving						Fumbles	
Year	Team	GP	GS	Tgt	Rec	Yds	Avg	Lng	TD	Fum	Lost
2019	SEA	2	2	**14**	**11**	**219**	19.9	**53**	1	0	0
2020	SEA	1	1	11	5	96	19.2	51	**2**	0	0
2022	SEA	1	1	13	10	136	13.6	50	**2**	0	0
2025	PIT	1	1	5	2	42	**21.0**	25	0	0	0
Career		5	5	43	28	493	17.6	53	5	0	0

=== College ===
Season	Team	GP	Receiving			
Season	Team	GP	Rec	Yds	Avg	TD
2016	Ole Miss	2	2	13	6.5	2
2017	Ole Miss	12	**39**	**646**	16.6	**7**
2018	Ole Miss	7	26	569	**21.9**	5
Career		21	67	1,228	18.3	14

== Awards and honors ==
- Second-team All-Pro (2020)
- 2× Pro Bowl (2020, 2023)
- Seattle Seahawks Top 50 players
- 4× NFL Top 100 — 81st (2020), 22nd (2021), 84th (2024), 88th (2026)
- Seahawks record most receiving yards in rookie debut: (89 vs. Cincinnati Bengals on September 8, 2019)

== Personal life ==
After ESPN announcer Joe Tessitore mistakenly called him "Decaf Metcalf", Metcalf partnered with Volcanica Coffee. Beginning in December 2019, 16-ounce bags of coffee labeled "Decaf Metcalf" began selling on the company's website. Part of the proceeds from the coffee sales were announced to be donated to Prison Fellowship.

Metcalf is a born-again Christian.

On February 17, 2023, Metcalf played in the NBA All-Star Weekend Celebrity Game. Metcalf shot 9 of 16 and finished with 20 points, 10 rebounds and four blocks. He also had some emphatic dunks in the 81–78 victory. This performance earned him the Most Valuable Player award for the game.

Metcalf has been in a relationship with singer Normani since 2022, after being introduced to each other through their mutual friends, Russell Wilson and Ciara. He announced their engagement on March 13, 2025, during his introductory press conference for the Steelers.
