= David Moore (wide receiver) =

American football player (born 1995)

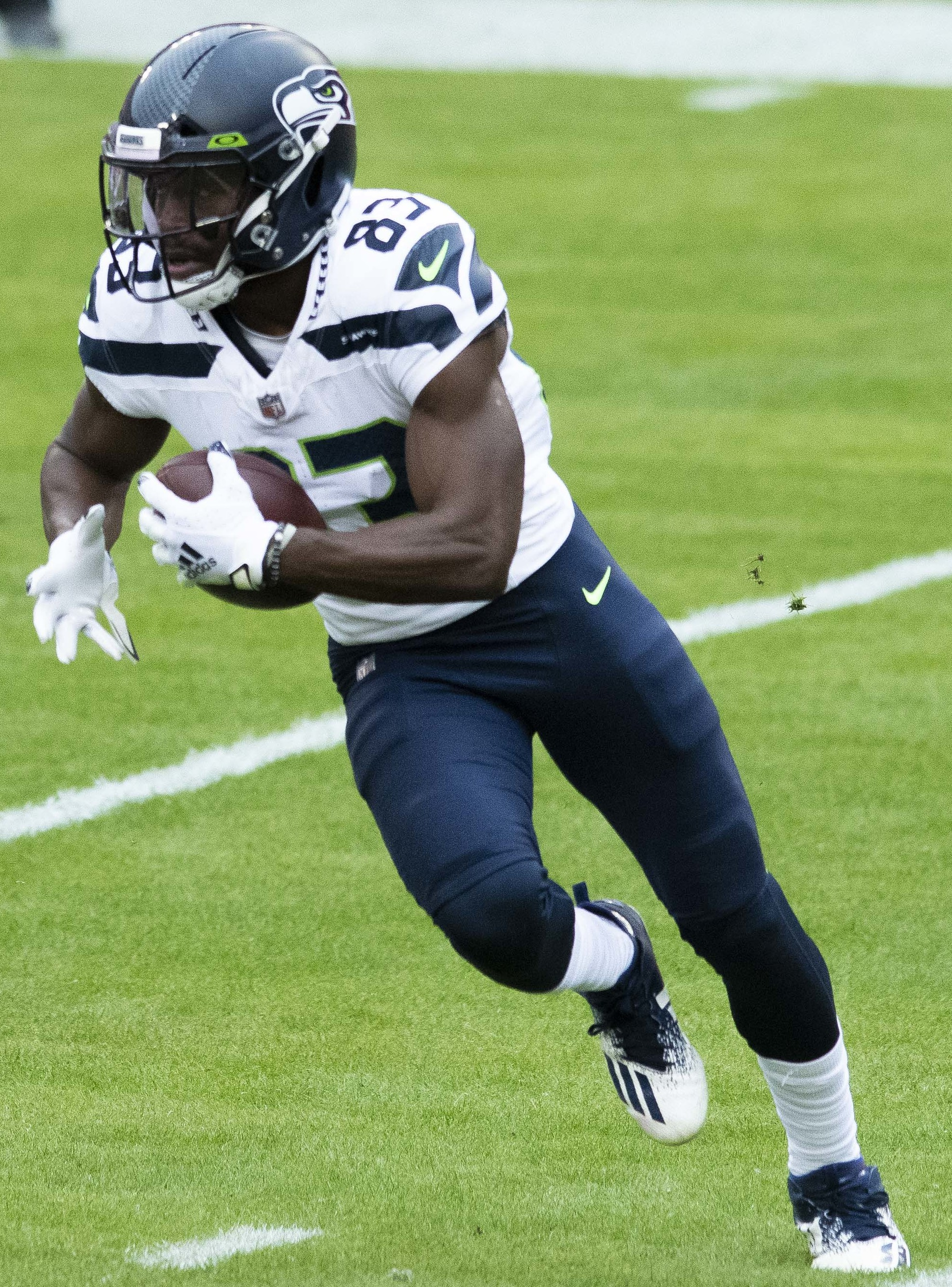
- Moore with the Seattle Seahawks in 2020

No. 83 – Carolina Panthers
- Position: Wide receiver
- Roster status: Practice squad

Personal information
- Born: January 15, 1995 (age 31); Gainesville, Texas, U.S.
- Listed height: 6 ft 0 in (1.83 m)
- Listed weight: 219 lb (99 kg)

Career information
- High school: Gainesville
- College: East Central (2013–2016)
- NFL draft: 2017: 7th round, 226th overall pick

Career history
- Seattle Seahawks (2017–2020); Carolina Panthers (2021)*; Las Vegas Raiders (2021)*; Denver Broncos (2021); Green Bay Packers (2021); Chicago Bears (2022); Tampa Bay Buccaneers (2023); Carolina Panthers (2024–present)
- * Offseason or practice squad member only

Career NFL statistics as of 2025
- Receptions: 116
- Receiving yards: 1,613
- Receiving touchdowns: 17
- Stats at Pro Football Reference

David James Moore (born January 15, 1995) is an American professional football wide receiver for the Carolina Panthers of the National Football League (NFL). He played college football for the East Central Tigers and was selected by the Seattle Seahawks in the seventh round of the 2017 NFL draft. He has also previously played in the NFL for the Denver Broncos, Green Bay Packers, Chicago Bears, and Tampa Bay Buccaneers.

== Early life ==
Moore attended and played high school football at Gainesville High School. As a senior, he recorded forty receptions for 700 yards and twelve touchdowns.

== College career ==
Moore played college football in Division II at East Central University in Ada, Oklahoma.

== Professional career ==
Pre-draft measurables
Height	Weight	Arm length	Hand span	Wingspan	40-yard dash	10-yard split	20-yard split	20-yard shuttle	Three-cone drill	Vertical jump	Broad jump	Bench press
6 ft 0 5/8 in (1.84 m)	219 lb (99 kg)	30 5/8 in (0.78 m)	9 1/2 in (0.24 m)	6 ft 2 1/2 in (1.89 m)	4.43 s	1.59 s	2.53 s	4.38 s	6.98 s	36.5 in (0.93 m)	10 ft 4 in (3.15 m)	26 reps
All values from Pro Day

=== Seattle Seahawks ===
In the 2017 NFL draft, Moore was selected by the Seattle Seahawks in the seventh round, 226th overall. Two weeks later on May 12, the Seahawks signed him to a four-year, $2.48 million contract that included a signing bonus of $87,365. Moore was waived on September 2, and assigned to the practice squad the next day. He was promoted to the Seahawks' active roster on November 22, 2017.

Against the Arizona Cardinals in Week 4 of the 2018 season, Moore recorded his first two professional receptions for 39 total yards. In the following game against the Los Angeles Rams, he had three receptions for 38 yards and his first two professional receiving touchdowns. In Weeks 6 and 8, he recorded a receiving touchdown against the Oakland Raiders and Detroit Lions. In Week 12, he had his first game going over the century mark with 103 yards and a touchdown against the Carolina Panthers. Moore finished the 2018 season with 26 receptions for 445 receiving yards and five receiving touchdowns.

In the 2019 season, Moore finished with 17 receptions for 301 receiving yards and two receiving touchdowns. He re-signed with Seattle on a one-year contract on April 22, 2020.

During the Seahawks' Week 2 game against the New England Patriots in 2020, Moore caught an improbable 38-yard touchdown on the sideline. The catch probability was rated as 6.3%, the lowest since Tyler Lockett's toe-drag reception in 2019 against the Rams.

=== Carolina Panthers (first stint) ===
On March 18, 2021, Moore signed a two-year, $4.75 million contract with the Carolina Panthers. He was released by Carolina on September 1.

=== Las Vegas Raiders ===
On September 6, 2021, Moore was signed to the Las Vegas Raiders' practice squad.

=== Denver Broncos ===
On September 28, 2021, Moore was signed by the Denver Broncos off the Raiders practice squad. He was released on October 19, and re-signed to the practice squad. Moore was released by Denver on November 9.

=== Green Bay Packers ===
On December 30, 2021, Moore was signed to the Green Bay Packers practice squad. He was elevated to the active roster on January 1, 2022, ahead of a Week 17 game against the Minnesota Vikings.

=== Chicago Bears ===
On April 21, 2022, Moore signed a one-year contract with the Chicago Bears. He was placed on injured reserve on August 21, after suffering a leg injury in practice. Moore was released by Chicago on September 17.

=== Tampa Bay Buccaneers ===
On May 15, 2023, Moore signed with the Tampa Bay Buccaneers. He was released on August 29, and re-signed to the practice squad. On December 13, Moore was promoted to the active roster. He had five receptions for 94 yards and a touchdown in the 2023 season. Moore scored a touchdown in the Buccaneers' 32–9 win over the Philadelphia Eagles in the Wild Card Round.

=== Carolina Panthers (second stint) ===
On March 19, 2024, Moore signed a one-year deal with the Carolina Panthers. In the 2024 season, Moore had 32 receptions for 351 yards and three touchdowns.

On March 18, 2025, Moore re-signed with the Panthers on a one-year contract. He recorded one catch in Carolina's first four games before suffering a "significant" elbow dislocation in Week 4 against the New England Patriots. Moore was placed on injured reserve on September 30. He was activated on January 6, 2026, ahead of the team's Wild Card matchup against the Los Angeles Rams.

On March 10, 2026, Moore re-signed with the Panthers. He was released by Carolina as a part of final roster cuts on August 30 as a part of final roster cuts and signed to the practice squad the next day. On September 30, Moore was promoted to the active roster. On November 10, he was released and re-signed to the practice squad the next day.

== NFL career statistics ==
=== Regular season ===
Year	Team	Games		Receiving					Fumbles	
Year	Team	GP	GS	Rec	Yds	Avg	Lng	TD	FUM	Lost
2017	SEA	1	0	0	0	0	0	0	0	0
2018	SEA	16	7	26	445	17.1	54	5	2	0
2019	SEA	14	1	17	301	17.7	60	2	2	1
2020	SEA	16	6	35	417	11.9	57	6	1	0
2021	DEN	2	0	0	0	0	0	0	0	0
2021	GB	1	0	0	0	0	0	0	0	0
2023	TB	7	0	5	94	18.8	52	1	0	0
2024	CAR	17	5	32	351	11.0	21	3	0	0
Total		74	19	115	1,608	14.0	60	17	5	1

=== Postseason ===
Year	Team	Games		Receiving					Fumbles	
Year	Team	GP	GS	Rec	Yds	Avg	Lng	TD	FUM	Lost
2018	SEA	1	0	0	0	0	0	0	0	0
2019	SEA	2	1	2	57	28.5	38	0	0	0
2020	SEA	1	1	1	1	1.0	1	0	0	0
2023	TB	2	0	3	77	25.7	44	1	0	0
Total		6	2	6	135	22.5	44	1	0	0

== Legal troubles ==
On July 3, 2022, Moore was found to have passed out in a Ford F-250 pickup truck while in a Taco Bell drive-through, in his hometown of Gainesville. Police claimed to have smelled marijuana and searched the vehicle. The search found THC edibles and 3 pistols. Moore was booked on July 4 and was released after posting a $5,000 bail for the marijuana possession and weapons charges.
