= Jason Myers =

American football player (born 1991)

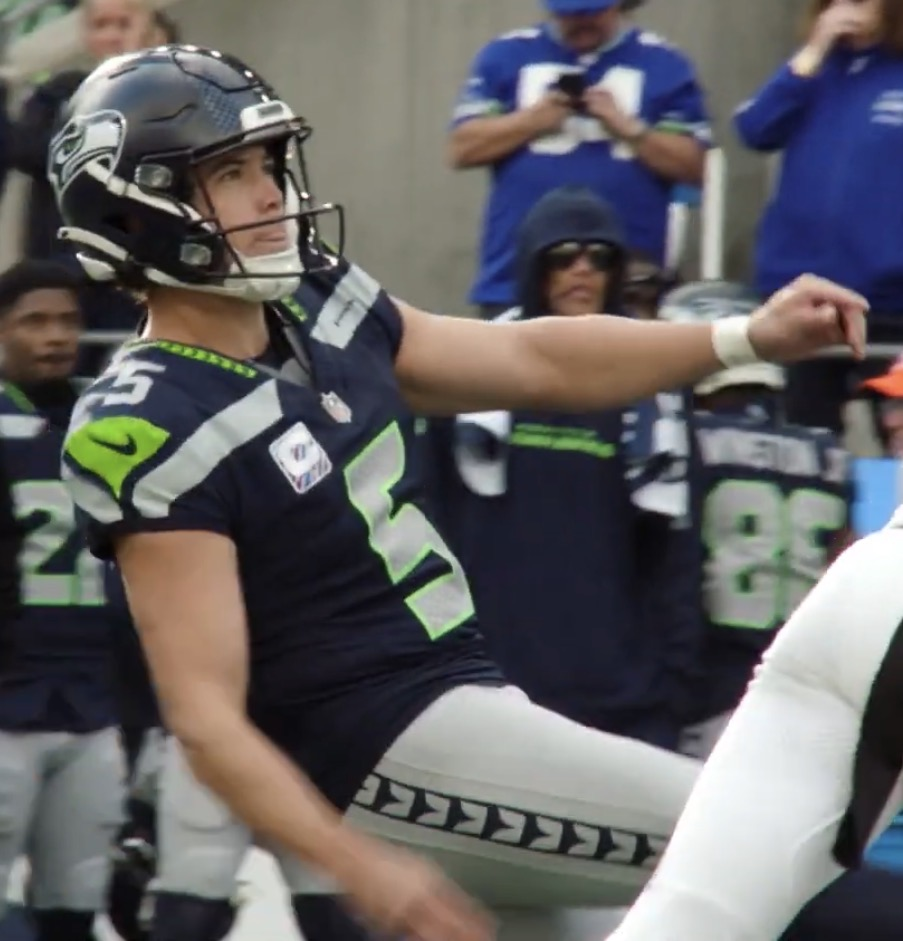
- Myers with the Seattle Seahawks in 2023

No. 5 – Seattle Seahawks
- Position: Placekicker
- Roster status: Active

Personal information
- Born: May 12, 1991 (age 35); Chula Vista, California, U.S.
- Listed height: 5 ft 10 in (1.78 m)
- Listed weight: 190 lb (86 kg)

Career information
- High school: Mater Dei Catholic (Chula Vista)
- College: Marist (2009–2012)
- NFL draft: 2013: undrafted

Career history
- San Jose SaberCats (2014); Arizona Rattlers (2014); Jacksonville Jaguars (2015–2017); Seattle Seahawks (2018)*; New York Jets (2018); Seattle Seahawks (2019–present)
- * Offseason or practice squad member only

Awards and highlights
- Super Bowl champion (LX); 2× Pro Bowl (2018, 2022); 2× NFL scoring leader (2022, 2025); NFL records: Most points scored in a season, no touchdowns: 171 (2025); Highest field goal percentage in a season (min. 20 attempts): 100.0 (2020, tied); Most field goals made in a Super Bowl: 5; Most points scored in a single season including postseason: 206 (2025)

Career NFL statistics as of Week 9, 2026
- Field goals made: 313
- Field goals attempted: 365
- Field goal %: 85.8%
- Extra points made: 416
- Extra points attempted: 448
- Extra point %: 92.8%
- Points: 1,355
- Longest field goal: 61
- Touchbacks: 525
- Stats at Pro Football Reference

Jason Myers (born May 12, 1991) is an American professional football placekicker for the Seattle Seahawks of the National Football League (NFL). He played college football for the Marist Red Foxes. Myers played for the Jacksonville Jaguars and New York Jets. He kicked five field goals in the Seahawks' Super Bowl LX victory, setting the record for the most field goals in a Super Bowl. Myers also scored 206 combined points in the 2025 regular season and postseason to set a new NFL record.

== Early life ==
Myers was born on May 12, 1991, in Chula Vista, California to Donny and Mary Myers. He attended Mater Dei Catholic High School, where he played varsity football for four years and was named Mesa Kicker of the Year. Myers also played soccer, winning a state championship and being named San Diego Division IV CIF Player of the Year.

== College career ==
Per Myers' own description, he was a "late bloomer" in high school and was not heavily recruited by college programs. Myers attended Marist University in Poughkeepsie, New York from 2009 to 2012, serving as their starting kicker all four years. As a freshman, he kicked a 37-yard field goal with two seconds remaining to narrowly win 23–21 against Georgetown and was named PFL Special Teams Player of the Week. As a senior, Myers also acted as Marist's primary punter.

During his collegiate career, Myers made 24 field goals out of 38 attempts. He left as Marist's all-time leading scorer among placekickers, also holding the program record for longest field goal (49 yards against Davidson in 2011). Myers was a three-time honorable mention for the All-PFL team.

== Professional career ==
=== Pre-draft ===
After his college career, Myers received no attention from professional scouts and returned to the San Diego metropolitan area. He worked as a valet while continuing to train and briefly joined the Arena Football League with the San Jose SaberCats and Arizona Rattlers. Myers later wrote that he still lacked proper kicking technique at this point, as Marist had no special teams coordinator and he had been largely self-taught. In August 2014, he began training with Michael Husted, a nine-year veteran NFL kicker. Through Husted, Myers was invited to a tryout at the 2015 Senior Bowl, and shortly after signed with the Jacksonville Jaguars.

=== Jacksonville Jaguars ===
==== 2015 season ====
On March 3, 2015, Myers signed with the Jaguars. He became just the third player from Marist to sign with an NFL team. He performed well in the preseason, making four of five field goal attempts, including one from 55 yards. On August 31, the Jaguars announced Myers had earned the starting role after trading veteran kicker Josh Scobee to the Pittsburgh Steelers. In Week 2 against the Miami Dolphins, Myers connected on a 58 yard field goal, one yard short of the Jaguars franchise record, and a game-winning 28-yarder with 40 seconds remaining. For the season, Myers converted 26 of 30 field goal attempts but struggled with extra points, converting 32 of 39 for a league-leading seven misses.

==== 2016 season ====
Myers was more consistent to start the 2016 season, making all of his first 13 attempts under 50 yards. In total, Myers made 27 field goals from 34 attempts and 29 extra points from 32 attempts. He led the league with 12 attempts above 50 yards, tying for second most made with seven. He was named the best kickoff kicker in 2016 by Pro Football Focus.

==== 2017 season ====
On October 17, 2017, after six games, Myers was released by the Jaguars. In the prior three weeks, he had missed three field goals: a 52-yard attempt against the New York Jets and two 54-yard attempts against the Los Angeles Rams, both by a "significant margin".

=== Seattle Seahawks (first stint) ===
On January 3, 2018, Myers signed with the Seattle Seahawks. On August 20, he was released after losing the starting kicking job to veteran Sebastian Janikowski.

=== New York Jets ===
On August 21, 2018, Myers was claimed off waivers by the New York Jets. He became the starting kicker after Taylor Bertolet was waived after the preseason.

During Week 6, Myers broke the Jets' franchise record for field goals with seven against the Indianapolis Colts as the Jets won 42–34. Myers was named AFC Special Teams Player of the Week for his performance. In the 2018 season, Myers converted 30 of 33 extra point attempts and 33 of 36 field goal attempts. He was named to the Pro Bowl for his performance during the 2018 season.

=== Seattle Seahawks (second stint) ===
On March 14, 2019, Myers signed a four-year, $15.45 million contract with the Seahawks.

==== 2019 season ====
On November 3, 2019, Myers missed two field goals against the Tampa Bay Buccaneers, including a potential game-winning kick at the end of regulation. Nevertheless, the Seahawks would go on to win in overtime, 40–34. In the next game, in a Monday Night Football matchup, Myers connected on both of his field goal attempts, including the game-winning 42-yard kick in overtime with no time left on the clock, to lift the Seahawks over the San Francisco 49ers 27–24 and move their record to 8–2 on the season. In the 2019 season, Myers converted 40 of 44 extra point attempts and 23 of 28 field goal attempts.

==== 2020 season ====
On November 15, 2020, in a Week 10 game against the Rams, Myers hit a career long and Seahawks franchise record long 61-yard field goal as time expired in the first half. On December 20, in a Week 15 game against the Washington Football Team, Myers kicked his 31st consecutive successful field goal, breaking the previous Seahawks record, held by Olindo Mare. He would finish the season a perfect 24-of-24 on field goal attempts, and 49 for 53 extra point attempts.

==== 2021 season ====
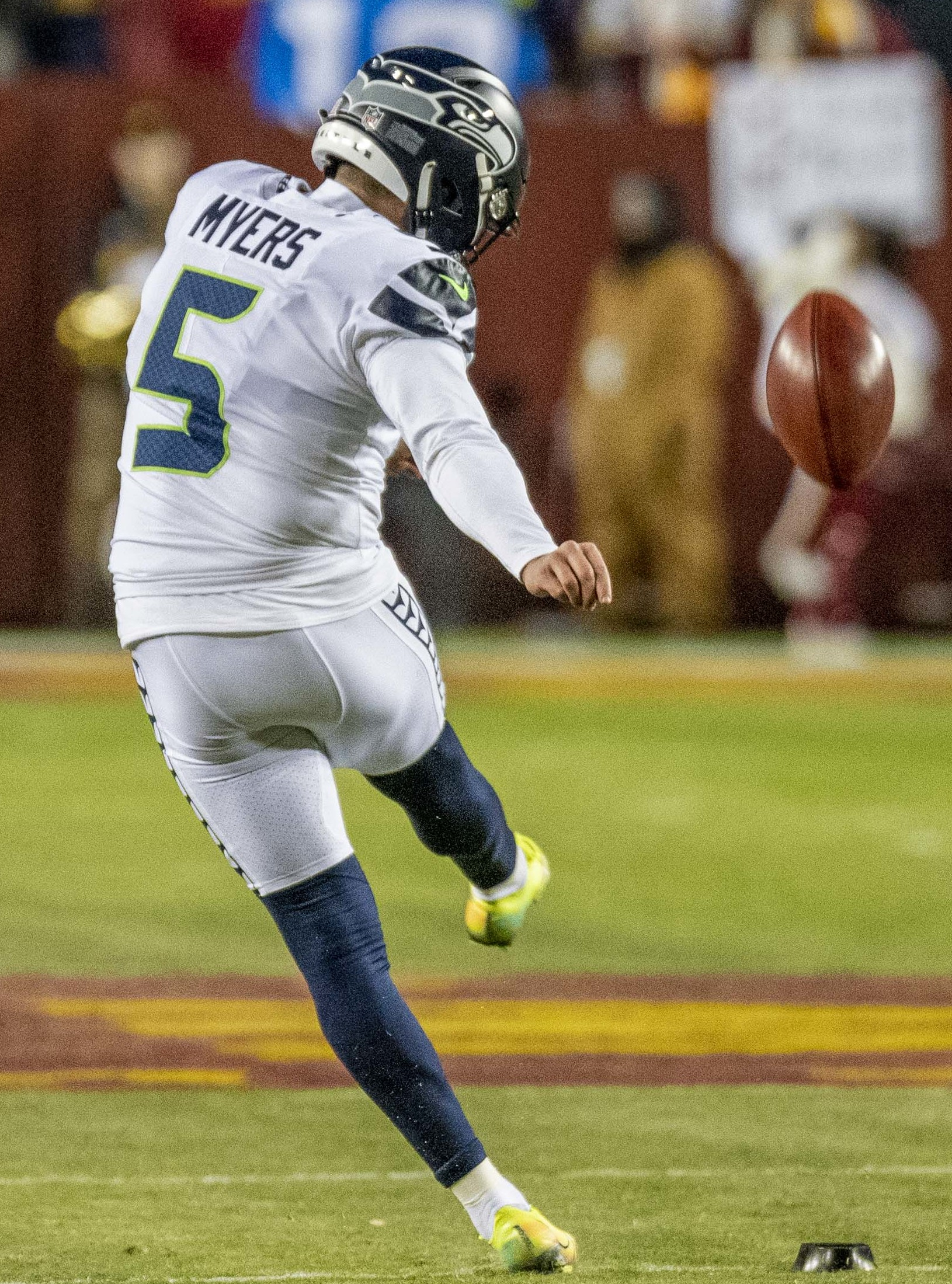
Myers in 2021

Myers' consecutive field goal streak would reach 37 straight field goals, the 4th longest streak in NFL history. On September 26, 2021, against the Minnesota Vikings, the streak ended as he missed a 44-yard field goal attempt wide left. After missing 4 of his first 10 field goals in the season, Myers would end the season by making 11 of his last 13 attempts. In total, Myers made 17 of his 23 field goal attempts and 44 of his 47 extra point attempts during the 2021 season.

==== 2022 season ====
In Week 18 of the 2022 season, Myers missed the game-winning field goal in the 4th quarter off the upright. However, later he hit the game-winning field goal in overtime as the Seahawks won 19–16 against the Rams. In the 2022 season, Myers converted 41 of 42 extra point attempts and 34 of 37 field goal attempts. With 143 points scored in the 2022 season, he led the NFL. He was named as a Pro Bowler for the 2022 season.

On January 18, 2023, Myers signed a four-year contract extension with the Seahawks which made him the second-highest paid kicker in the league behind only Justin Tucker. In September, he was named a team captain.

==== 2023 season ====
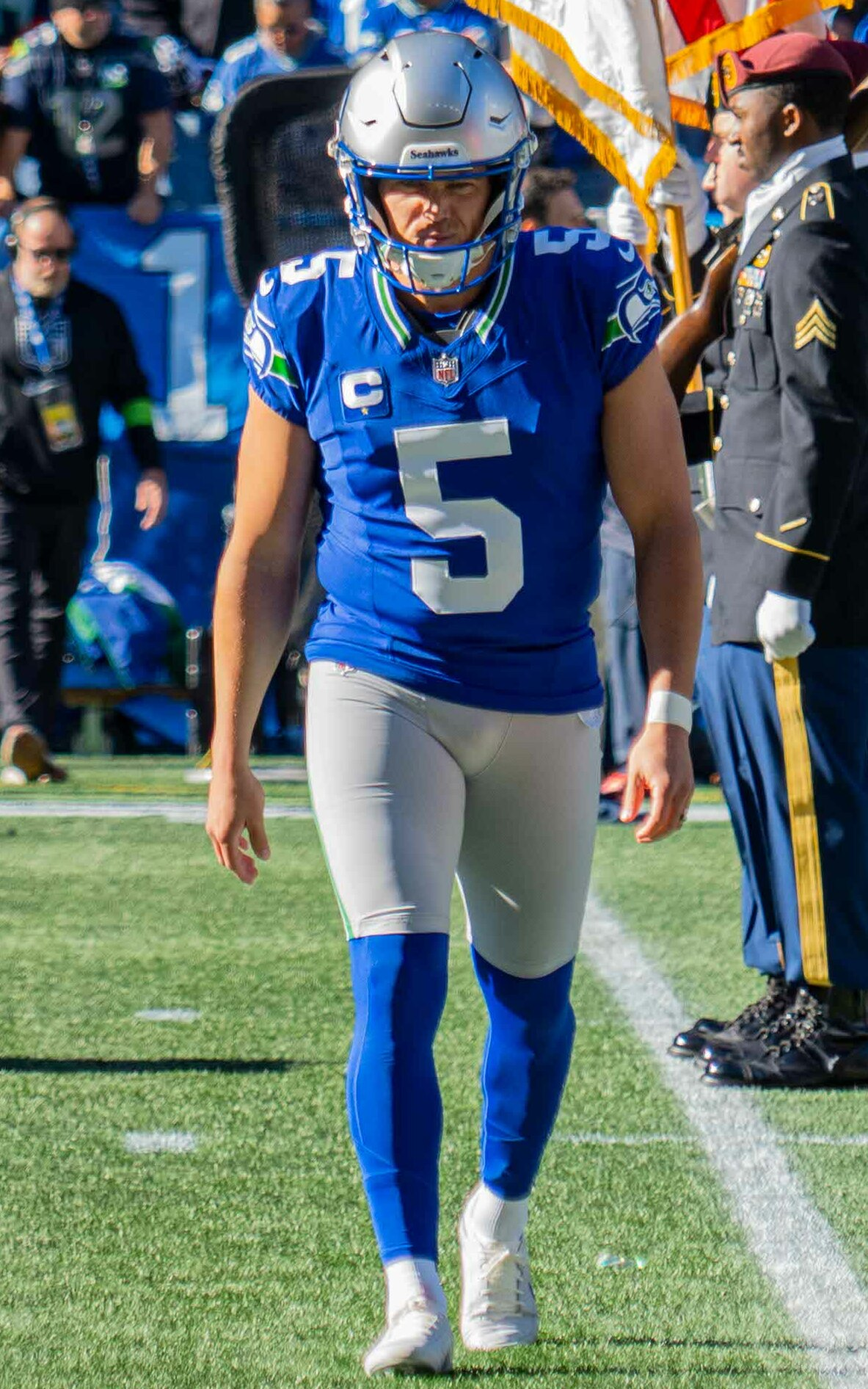
Myers in 2023

In Week 10 of the 2023 season, Myers made five field goals including the game-winning field goal against the Washington Commanders as the Seahawks won 29–26. His performance earned him NFC Special Teams Player of the Week. In Week 11, in a game versus the Los Angeles Rams, he missed a potential game-winning 55 yard field goal wide right with 8 seconds left in the game. As a result, the Seahawks lost 16–17. After starting the season 9 of 13 on field goal attempts in the season, Myers would end the season making 26 of his last 29 field goal attempts. In total, Myers went 35 of 42 on field goal attempts (83.3%) which led the league, and 33 of 33 on extra point attempts (100%) in the 2023 NFL season. This also marked the first time Myers had not missed an extra point in a season.

==== 2024 season ====
In Week 2, against the New England Patriots, Myers kicked a game-winning 31 yard field goal. In the 2024 season, Myers converted 26 of 30 field goal attempts (86.7%) and 37 of 40 extra point attempts (92.5%). Myers was one of the nominees for the Seattle Seahawks Top 50 players, in 2025, but did not make the final list.

==== 2025 season ====
In Week 10, Myers became the Seahawks franchise record holder for field goals made on a 34-yard attempt, his third of the game, in a 44–22 win against the Arizona Cardinals. In the next game against the Rams, Myers missed a game-winning 61-yard field goal wide right, as the Seahawks lost 21–19. Myers was named NFC Special Teams Player of the Month after making 15 field goals and 16 extra points in the month of November. During Week 15 against the Indianapolis Colts, Myers accounted for all of the Seahawks' points, making all six of his field goals, including the game-winning 56-yard field goal, to narrowly win 18–16. He also broke the franchise record of made field goals in a game, previously five, held by Norm Johnson, Todd Peterson, Olindo Mare, and Stephen Hauschka. In the regular-season finale against the San Francisco 49ers, Myers broke the NFL record for most points by a kicker in a single season, surpassing David Akers' 166 in 2011. In total, Myers went 41 of 48 on field goal attempts (85.4%), which led the league, and 48 of 48 on extra point attempts (100%) on the season. This marked the second time Myers had not missed an extra point in a season.

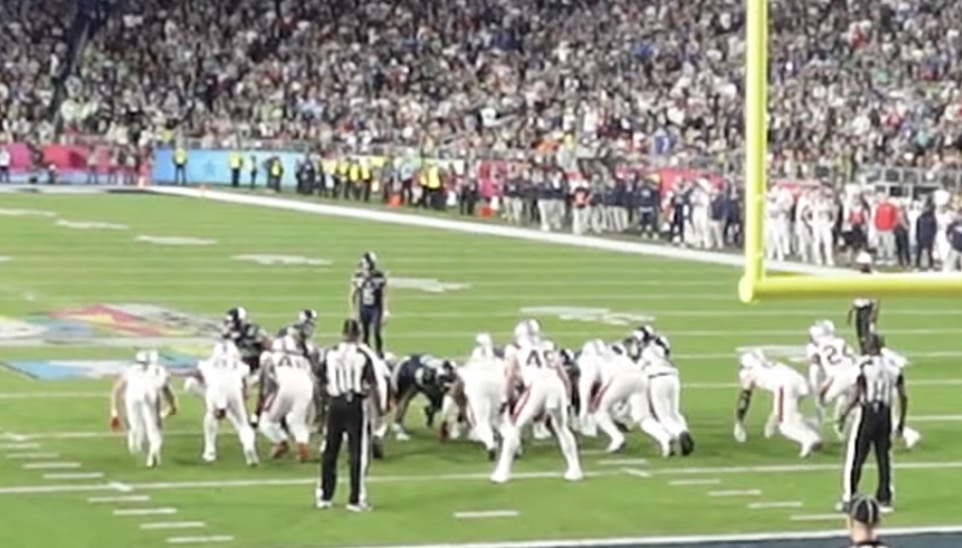
Myers kicking a field goal in Super Bowl LX

Myers was the only player to score in the first three quarters of Seattle's 29-13 victory in Super Bowl LX, making four field goals on four attempts. He set the record for most field goals made in a Super Bowl by connecting on all five of his attempts, as well as two extra points. Myers also set the record for most points scored by any player in an NFL season (regular season and postseason combined) with 206, including the 17 in the Super Bowl; he is the only player to top 200 points in that regard.

==== 2026 season ====
Myers struggled in the 2026 preseason, missing two extra points and three field goals. He missed a 45-yard field goal in the first week, missed an extra point and a 44-yard field goal in the second week. In the final week of the preseason, he missed an extra point and a 52-yard game-winning field goal against the Kansas City Chiefs, ending in a 9–9 tie.

Following the preseason, however, Myers's performance improved. In Week 1, in a Super Bowl rematch against the Patriots, Myers made an extra point and two field goals, a 30 yarder and a 26 yard field goal, which would give them the lead with under six minutes left. They won the game 13–10. Two weeks later, Myers kicked a 57 yard field goal and four extra points in a 31–33 loss to the Washington Commanders.

== NFL career statistics ==
Legend
	Won the Super Bowl
	NFL record
	Led the league
**Bold**	Career high

=== Regular season ===
General			Field goals					PATs			Kickoffs			Points
Season	Team	GP	FGM	FGA	FG%	Blck	Long	XPM	XPA	XP%	KO	Avg	TBs	Pts
2015	JAX	16	26	30	86.7	1	58	32	39	82.1	84	62.0	55	110
2016	JAX	16	27	34	79.4	**2**	56	29	32	90.6	76	61.5	**60**	110
2017	JAX	6	11	15	73.3	0	47	15	17	88.2	35	60.5	26	48
2018	NYJ	16	33	36	91.7	0	56	30	33	90.9	82	64.1	**60**	129
2019	SEA	16	23	28	82.1	0	54	40	44	90.9	85	62.8	59	109
2020	SEA	16	24	24	**100.0**	0	**61**	**49**	**53**	92.5	91	63.6	52	121
2021	SEA	17	17	23	73.9	0	53	44	47	93.6	83	61.2	31	95
2022	SEA	17	34	37	91.9	0	56	41	42	97.6	93	62.8	54	143
2023	SEA	17	35	42	83.3	0	55	33	33	**100.0**	86	63.1	55	138
2024	SEA	17	26	30	86.7	1	59	37	40	92.5	86	**64.2**	46	115
2025	SEA	17	**41**	**48**	85.4	0	57	48	48	**100.0**	**103**	61.1	18	**171**
2026	SEA	9	16	18	88.9	1	57	18	20	90.0	43	61.0	8	66
Career		180	313	365	85.8	5	61	416	448	92.8	947	63.0	524	1,355

=== Postseason ===
General			Field goals					PATs			Kickoffs			Points
Season	Team	GP	FGM	FGA	FG%	Blck	Long	XPM	XPA	XP%	KO	Avg	TBs	Pts
2019	SEA	2	2	4	50.0	0	49	4	4	100.0	9	61.4	**6**	10
2020	SEA	1	2	2	**100.0**	0	50	2	2	100.0	4	**63.3**	2	8
2022	SEA	1	1	1	**100.0**	0	**56**	2	2	100.0	4	51.8	3	5
2025	SEA	**3**	**8**	**8**	**100.0**	0	41	**11**	**11**	100.0	**22**	59.7	5	**35**
Career		7	13	15	86.7	0	56	19	19	100.0	39	59.6	16	58

== Career highlights ==
=== Awards and honors ===
- Super Bowl champion (LX)
- 2× Pro Bowl (2018, 2022)
- 2× NFL scoring leader (2022, 2025)

=== Records ===
==== NFL records ====
- Most points in a season, no touchdowns: 171 (2025)
- Highest field goal percentage in a season (min. 20 attempts): 100.0 (2020, tied)
- Most field goals made in a Super Bowl: 5
- Most points scored by a kicker in a Super Bowl: 17
- Most points scored in a single season including postseason: 206 (2025)

==== Seahawks franchise records ====
Career

- Most field goals made: 200
- Most points scored: 892
- Most touchbacks: 315
- Most consecutive games with a field goal: 26
- Most consecutive field goals made: 37
- Longest field goal: 61 yards

Season

- Most field goals made in a season: 41 (2025)
- Most field goals attempted in a season: 48 (2025)
- Most 50+ yard field goals made in a season: 9 (2024, 2025)
- Most points scored in a season: 171 (2025)

Game

- Most field goals made in a game: 6 (Week 14, 2025, vs. Indianapolis Colts)

==== Jets franchise records ====
- Most field goals made in a game: 7 (Week 6, 2018, vs. Indianapolis Colts)

== Personal life ==
Myers is of Filipino descent through his great-grandfather, who was originally from the Philippines and immigrated to the United States via Pensacola, Florida, serving in the U.S. Navy.
