= 2020 Seattle Seahawks season =

American football team season

- Owner: Estate of Paul Allen
- General manager: John Schneider
- Head coach: Pete Carroll
- Offensive coordinator: Brian Schottenheimer
- Defensive coordinator: Ken Norton Jr.
- Home stadium: Lumen Field (Note: Formerly known as CenturyLink Field until November 19.)

Results
- Record: 12–4
- Division place: 1st NFC West
- Playoffs: Lost Wild Card Playoffs (vs. Rams) 20–30
- All-Pros: 3: LB Bobby Wagner (1st team); WR DK Metcalf (2nd team); S Jamal Adams (2nd team)
- Pro Bowlers: 7: QB Russell Wilson; WR DK Metcalf; MLB Bobby Wagner; FS Quandre Diggs; FS Jamal Adams; LS Tyler Ott; ST Nick Bellore

Uniform
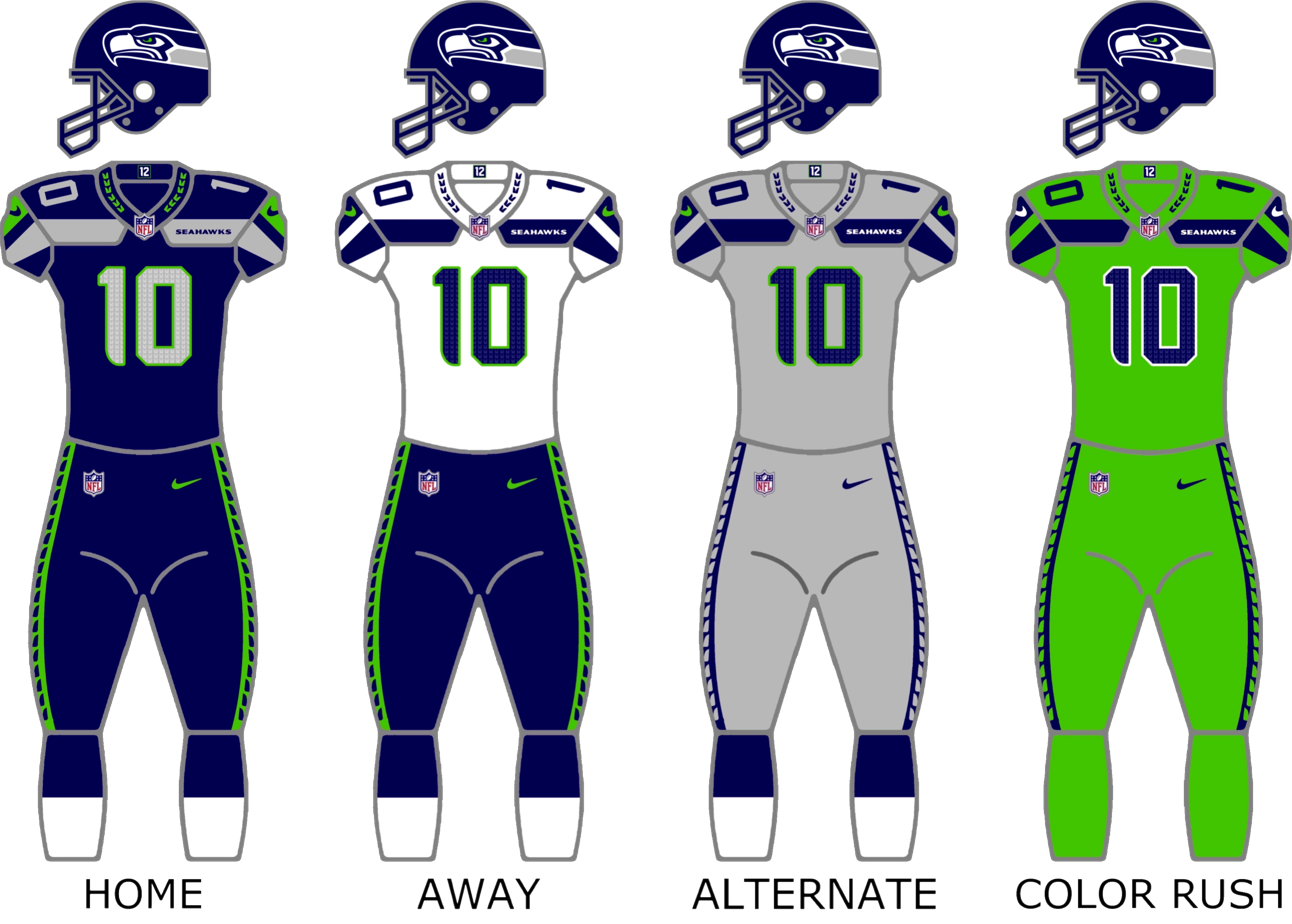

The 2020 season was the Seattle Seahawks' 45th in the National Football League (NFL) and their 11th season under head coach Pete Carroll. With a win over the Washington Football Team in Week 15, the Seahawks made the playoffs for the third consecutive year. With a Week 17 win over the San Francisco 49ers, they improved upon their 11–5 record from the previous season. For the first time in franchise history, the Seahawks started 5–0. After a Week 16 win over the Los Angeles Rams, the Seahawks clinched the NFC West title for the first time since 2016.

However, in the Wild Card round, the Seahawks were defeated by the rival Rams 30–20. This was the Seahawks first home playoff loss in the Wilson/Carroll era and their first home playoff loss since 2004, which also came against the Rams. This would be the last Seahawks team to win the NFC West until 2025.

On November 19, 2020, CenturyLink Field was renamed Lumen Field.

On February 6, 2021, Russell Wilson was named Walter Payton NFL Man of the Year, the second Seahawk to earn the honor, after Steve Largent.

The Seahawks were the only team in the league to not have a player test positive for COVID-19 during the season. The team used approximately 36,000 tests for players and personnel, and detected close interactions using proximity sensors. Due to the pandemic, home games were played without fans in attendance. Additionally, six of Seattle's eight road games were played without fans. Despite the absence of fans in attendance, the Seahawks went 7–1 at home during the regular season, their best home record since 2016.

== Draft ==
2020 Seattle Seahawks draft
Round	Selection	Player	Position	College	Notes
1	27	Jordyn Brooks	LB	Texas Tech	
2	48	Darrell Taylor	DE	Tennessee	from New York Jets
3	69	Damien Lewis	OG	LSU	from Carolina Panthers
4	133	Colby Parkinson	TE	Stanford	
4	144 *	DeeJay Dallas	RB	Miami	
5	148	Alton Robinson	DE	Syracuse	from Carolina Panthers
6	214 *	Freddie Swain	WR	Florida	
7	251 *	Stephen Sullivan	TE	LSU	from Miami Dolphins

*	Compensatory selection

Notes

- The Seahawks traded their original second-round selection (No. 59) and a compensatory third-round selection (No. 101) to the New York Jets in exchange for the Jets' second-round selection (No. 48).
- The Seahawks acquired an additional second-round selection (No. 64) as part of a trade that sent defensive end Frank Clark to the Kansas City Chiefs. This selection was traded to the Carolina Panthers in exchange for the Panthers' third-round selection (No. 69) and a fifth-round selection (No. 148).
- The Seahawks traded their original third-round selection (No. 91), along with linebackers Jacob Martin and Barkevious Mingo to the Houston Texans in exchange for defensive end Jadeveon Clowney.
- The Seahawks traded their original fifth-round selection (No. 172) to the Detroit Lions in exchange for safety Quandre Diggs and the Lions' 2021 seventh-round selection.
- The Seahawks acquired a new fifth-round selection (No. 162) in a trade that sent tight end Nick Vannett to the Pittsburgh Steelers.
- The Seahawks traded their original sixth-round selection (No. 206) to the Jacksonville Jaguars in exchange for a 2019 seventh-round selection.
- The Seahawks traded their seventh-round selection (No. 241) to the New England Patriots in exchange for tight end Jacob Hollister.

== Staff ==
On September 11, special teams coordinator Brian Schneider left the team for personal reasons. Assistant special teams coordinator Larry Izzo was promoted to interim special teams coordinator in his absence.

2020 Seattle Seahawks staff
Front office: Owner – Estate of Paul Allen; Executor/chairwoman – Jody Allen; President – Chuck Arnold; Executive vice president/general manager – John Schneider; Vice president of football administration – Matt Thomas; Vice president of football operations – Scott Fitterer; Vice president of player personnel – Trent Kirchner; Director of college scouting – Matt Berry; Director of pro personnel – Nolan Teasley; Personnel executive – Alonzo Highsmith; Head coaches: Head coach/executive vice president of football operations – Pete Carroll; Assistant head coach/defensive line – Clint Hurtt; Offensive coaches: Offensive coordinator – Brian Schottenheimer; Passing game coordinator – Dave Canales; Quarterbacks – Austin Davis; Running backs – Chad Morton; Wide receivers – Nate Carroll; Assistant wide receivers – Brad Idzik; Tight ends – Pat McPherson; Offensive line – Mike Solari; Assistant offensive line – Pat Ruel; Senior offensive assistant – Sanjay Lal; Offensive assistant – Keli'i Kekuewa and Kerry Joseph	Defensive coaches: Defensive coordinator – Ken Norton Jr.; Passing game coordinator – Andre Curtis; Linebackers – John Glenn; Secondary/nickel specialist – Nick Sorensen; Defensive assistant/defensive line – Damione Lewis; Defensive assistant/linebackers – Aaron Curry; Defensive quality control – Tom Donatell; Special teams coaches: Interim special teams coordinator – Larry Izzo; Strength and conditioning: Head strength and conditioning – Ivan Lewis; Assistant strength and conditioning – Jamie Yanchar; Assistant strength and conditioning – Thomas Garcia; Assistant strength and conditioning – Mark Philipp; Assistant strength and conditioning – Grant Steen

== Final roster ==
2020 Seattle Seahawks roster
Quarterbacks (QB): 7 Geno Smith; 3 Russell Wilson; Running backs (RB): 44 Nick Bellore FB; 32 Chris Carson; 31 DeeJay Dallas; 30 Carlos Hyde; 20 Rashaad Penny; Wide receivers (WR): 16 Tyler Lockett; 14 DK Metcalf; 83 David Moore; 18 Freddie Swain; Tight ends (TE): 89 Will Dissly; 86 Jacob Hollister; 88 Greg Olsen; 84 Colby Parkinson; 82 Luke Willson	Offensive linemen (OL): 76 Duane Brown T; 61 Kyle Fuller C; 70 Mike Iupati G; 68 Damien Lewis G; 74 Cedric Ogbuehi T; 77 Ethan Pocic C; 72 Brandon Shell T; 66 Jordan Simmons G; 75 Chad Wheeler T; Defensive linemen (DL): 43 Carlos Dunlap DE; 91 L. J. Collier DE; 97 Poona Ford DT; 94 Rasheem Green DE; 75 Cedrick Lattimore DT; 95 Benson Mayowa DE; 92 Bryan Mone DT; 99 Damontre Moore DE; 90 Jarran Reed DT; 98 Alton Robinson DE	Linebackers (LB): 57 Cody Barton MLB; 56 Jordyn Brooks OLB; 55 Ben Burr-Kirven OLB; 49 Shaquem Griffin OLB; 54 Bobby Wagner MLB; 50 K. J. Wright OLB; Defensive backs (DB): 33 Jamal Adams SS; 28 Ugo Amadi FS; 37 Quandre Diggs FS; 21 Tre Flowers CB; 26 Shaquill Griffin CB; 35 Ryan Neal SS; 36 Damarious Randall SS; 29 D. J. Reed CB; 34 Linden Stephens CB; Special teams (ST): 4 Michael Dickson P; 5 Jason Myers K; 69 Tyler Ott LS	Practice squad: 52 Ray-Ray Armstrong LB; 78 Alex Boone G; 79 Tommy Champion T; 41 Alex Collins RB; 2 Danny Etling QB; 17 Aaron Fuller WR; 19 Penny Hart WR; 38 Gavin Heslop CB; 64 Brad Lundblade C; 85 Tyler Mabry TE; 6 Alex McGough QB; 47 Jordan Miller CB; 40 Bo Scarbrough RB (PS/I); 48 Stephen Sullivan (PS/I); 81 Cody Thompson WR; 15 John Ursua WR; Reserve: 27 Marquise Blair SS (IR); 93 Jonathan Bullard DE (COVID-19); 36 Patrick Carr RB (IR); 11 Phillip Dorsett WR (IR); 22 Quinton Dunbar CB (IR/DFR); 10 Josh Gordon WR (Exempt); 60 Phil Haynes G (IR); 42 Lano Hill SS (IR); 25 Travis Homer RB (IR); 51 Bruce Irvin OLB (IR); 93 Branden Jackson DE (IR); 73 Jamarco Jones T (IR); 39 Jayson Stanley CB (IR); 58 Darrell Taylor DE (NF-Inj.); 23 Neiko Thorpe CB (IR); 65 Chance Warmack G (Opt-out); Rookies in italics 53 active, 15 reserve, 15 practice squad (2 exempt)

== Preseason ==
The Seahawks' preseason schedule was announced on May 7, but was later cancelled due to the COVID-19 pandemic.

Week	Date	Opponent	Venue	Result
1	August 13	Las Vegas Raiders	CenturyLink Field	Cancelled due to the COVID-19 pandemic
2	August 22	at Houston Texans	NRG Stadium	Cancelled due to the COVID-19 pandemic
3	August 27	Los Angeles Chargers	CenturyLink Field	Cancelled due to the COVID-19 pandemic
4	September 3	at Minnesota Vikings	U.S. Bank Stadium	Cancelled due to the COVID-19 pandemic

== Regular season ==
=== Schedule ===
The Seahawks' 2020 schedule was announced on May 7.

Divisional matchups: the NFC West played the NFC East and the AFC East.

Week	Date	Opponent	Result	Record	Venue	Recap
1	September 13	at Atlanta Falcons	**W** 38–25	1–0	Mercedes-Benz Stadium	Recap
2	September 20	New England Patriots	**W** 35–30	2–0	CenturyLink Field	Recap
3	September 27	Dallas Cowboys	**W** 38–31	3–0	CenturyLink Field	Recap
4	October 4	at Miami Dolphins	**W** 31–23	4–0	Hard Rock Stadium	Recap
5	October 11	Minnesota Vikings	**W** 27–26	5–0	CenturyLink Field	Recap
6	Bye					
7	October 25	at **Arizona Cardinals**	**L** 34–37 (OT)	5–1	State Farm Stadium	Recap
8	November 1	**San Francisco 49ers**	**W** 37–27	6–1	CenturyLink Field	Recap
9	November 8	at Buffalo Bills	**L** 34–44	6–2	Bills Stadium	Recap
10	November 15	at **Los Angeles Rams**	**L** 16–23	6–3	SoFi Stadium	Recap
11	November 19	**Arizona Cardinals**	**W** 28–21	7–3	Lumen Field	Recap
12	November 30	at Philadelphia Eagles	**W** 23–17	8–3	Lincoln Financial Field	Recap
13	December 6	New York Giants	**L** 12–17	8–4	Lumen Field	Recap
14	December 13	New York Jets	**W** 40–3	9–4	Lumen Field	Recap
15	December 20	at Washington Football Team	**W** 20–15	10–4	FedExField	Recap
16	December 27	**Los Angeles Rams**	**W** 20–9	11–4	Lumen Field	Recap
17	January 3, 2021	at **San Francisco 49ers**	**W** 26–23	12–4	State Farm Stadium (Note: Due to a ban on all contact sports imposed by California's Santa Clara County as a result from rising COVID-19 cases, the Seahawks' Week 17 regular season finale at the San Francisco 49ers was moved from Levi's Stadium to Arizona's State Farm Stadium.)	Recap

Note: Intra-division opponents are in bold text.

=== Game summaries ===
==== Week 1: at Atlanta Falcons ====
Week One: Seattle Seahawks at Atlanta Falcons – Game summary

Quarter	1	2	3	4	Total
**Seahawks**	14	0	14	10	**38**
Falcons	3	9	0	13	**25**

at Mercedes-Benz Stadium, Atlanta, Georgia

- Date: September 13
- Game time: 1:00 p.m. EDT/10:00 a.m. PDT
- Game weather: Mostly cloudy, 80 °F (27 °C) (retractable roof open)
- Game attendance: 0
- Referee: Shawn Hochuli
- TV announcers (Fox): Adam Amin, Mark Schlereth and Lindsay Czarniak
- Recap, Game Book

Game information

**First quarter**

- ATL – Younghoe Koo 49-yard field goal, 11:06. Falcons 3–0. **Drive: 9 plays, 44 yards, 3:54.**
- SEA – Chris Carson 3-yard pass from Russell Wilson (Jason Myers kick), 4:43. Seahawks 7–3. **Drive: 11 plays, 77 yards, 6:23.**
- SEA – Chris Carson 3-yard pass from Russell Wilson (Jason Myers kick), 0:53. Seahawks 14–3. **Drive: 3 plays, 60 yards, 1:17.**

**Second quarter**

- ATL – Todd Gurley 1-yard run (kick failed), 11:25. Seahawks 14–9. **Drive: 9 plays, 75 yards, 4:28.**
- ATL – Younghoe Koo 49-yard field goal, 0:00. Seahawks 14–12. **Drive: 11 plays, 60 yards, 1:37.**

**Third quarter**

- SEA – DK Metcalf 38-yard pass from Russell Wilson (Jason Myers kick), 9:41. Seahawks 21–12. **Drive: 10 plays, 75 yards, 5:19.**
- SEA – Greg Olsen 7-yard pass from Russell Wilson (Jason Myers kick), 5:05. Seahawks 28–12. **Drive: 5 plays, 36 yards, 2:48.**

**Fourth quarter**

- SEA – Jason Myers 42-yard field goal, 11:19. Seahawks 31–12. **Drive: 8 plays, 57 yards, 4:50.**
- ATL – Calvin Ridley 18-yard pass from Matt Ryan (kick failed), 9:35. Seahawks 31–18. **Drive: 5 plays, 75 yards, 1:44.**
- SEA – Carlos Hyde 1-yard run (Jason Myers kick), 3:45. Seahawks 38–18. **Drive: 7 plays, 65 yards, 2:30.**
- ATL – Calvin Ridley 7-yard pass from Matt Ryan (Younghoe Koo kick), 0:33. Seahawks 38–25. **Drive: 12 plays, 75 yards, 3:12.**

**Top passers**

- SEA – Russell Wilson – 31/35, 322 yards, 4 TD
- ATL – Matt Ryan – 37/54, 450 yards, 2 TD, INT

**Top rushers**

- SEA – Russell Wilson – 3 rushes, 29 yards
- ATL – Todd Gurley – 14 rushes, 56 yards, TD

**Top receivers**

- SEA – DK Metcalf – 4 receptions, 95 yards, TD
- ATL – Julio Jones – 9 receptions, 157 yards

==== Week 2: vs. New England Patriots ====
Week Two: New England Patriots at Seattle Seahawks – Game summary

Quarter	1	2	3	4	Total
Patriots	7	10	7	6	**30**
**Seahawks**	7	14	7	7	**35**

at CenturyLink Field, Seattle, Washington

- Date: September 20
- Game time: 5:20 p.m. PDT
- Game weather: Sunny, 70 °F (21 °C)
- Game attendance: 0
- Referee: Craig Wrolstad
- TV announcers (NBC): Al Michaels, Cris Collinsworth, Michele Tafoya and Terry McAulay
- Recap, Game Book

Game information

**First quarter**

- NE – Devin McCourty 43-yard interception return (Nick Folk kick), 13:39. Patriots 7–0.
- SEA – Tyler Lockett 4-yard pass from Russell Wilson (Jason Myers kick), 5:27. Tied 7–7. **Drive: 13 plays, 75 yards, 8:12.**

**Second quarter**

- NE – Cam Newton 1-yard run (Nick Folk kick), 13:59. Patriots 14–7. **Drive: 12 plays, 72 yards, 6:28.**
- SEA – DK Metcalf 54-yard pass from Russell Wilson (Jason Myers kick), 6:57. Tied 14–14. **Drive: 4 plays, 75 yards, 1:51.**

**Third quarter**

- NE – Nick Folk 25-yard field goal, 10:12. Patriots 17–14. **Drive: 13 plays, 68 yards, 4:48.**
- SEA – David Moore 38-yard pass from Russell Wilson (Jason Myers kick), 7:04. Seahawks 21–17. **Drive: 6 plays, 75 yards, 3:08.**
- SEA – Freddie Swain 21-yard pass from Russell Wilson (Jason Myers kick), 2:00. Seahawks 28–17. **Drive: 5 plays, 52 yards, 2:30.**

**Fourth quarter**

- NE – Jakob Johnson 1-yard pass from Cam Newton (run failed), 14:14. Seahawks 28–23. **Drive: 6 plays, 77 yards, 2:46.**
- SEA – Chris Carson 18-yard pass from Russell Wilson (Jason Myers kick), 4:32. Seahawks 35–23. **Drive: 9 plays, 65 yards, 4:24.**
- NE – Cam Newton 1-yard run (Nick Folk kick), 2:16. Seahawks 35–30. **Drive: 7 plays, 75 yards, 2:16.**

**Top passers**

- NE – Cam Newton – 30/44, 397 yards, TD, INT
- SEA – Russell Wilson – 21/28, 288 yards, 5 TD, INT

**Top rushers**

- NE – Cam Newton – 11 rushes, 47 yards, 2 TD
- SEA – Chris Carson – 17 rushes, 72 yards

**Top receivers**

- NE – Julian Edelman – 8 receptions, 179 yards
- SEA – DK Metcalf – 4 receptions, 92 yards, TD

In a competitive game on primetime, the Seahawks pulled ahead by the third quarter but the game was decided on the final play; the Patriots had driven to a 1st-and-goal on Seattle's 1-yard line, but in a reversal of fate from Super Bowl XLIX, the Seahawks defense was able to stuff a rushing play from Patriots quarterback Cam Newton for no gain on the next play. As the Patriots were out of timeouts, the Seahawks managed to hold on for a thrilling win, earning their second straight 2–0 start. This game had to be monitored the entire week due to the bad air quality in the city thanks to fires across Washington and Oregon.

==== Week 3: vs. Dallas Cowboys ====
Week Three: Dallas Cowboys at Seattle Seahawks – Game summary

Quarter	1	2	3	4	Total
Cowboys	9	6	7	9	**31**
**Seahawks**	9	14	7	8	**38**

at CenturyLink Field, Seattle, Washington

- Date: September 27
- Game time: 1:25 p.m. PDT
- Game weather: Sunny, 63 °F (17 °C)
- Game attendance: 0
- Referee: Carl Cheffers
- TV announcers (Fox): Joe Buck, Troy Aikman and Erin Andrews
- Recap, Game Book

Game information

**First quarter**

- DAL – Greg Zuerlein 43-yard field goal, 8:10. Cowboys 3–0. **Drive: 13 play, 55 yards, 5:20.**
- SEA – Tyler Lockett 43-yard pass from Russell Wilson (Jason Myers kick), 6:39. Seahawks 7–3. **Drive: 4 play, 75 yards, 1:31.**
- SEA – Ezekiel Elliott tackled in end zone by Bryan Mone for a safety, 6:36. Seahawks 9–3.
- DAL – Ezekiel Elliott 1-yard run (kick failed), 1:40. Tied 9–9. **Drive: 8 play, 65 yards, 3:07.**

**Second quarter**

- SEA – Tyler Lockett 1-yard pass from Russell Wilson (Jason Myers kick), 6:53. Seahawks 16–9. **Drive: 11 play, 71 yards, 4:38.**
- DAL – Cedrick Wilson Jr. 40-yard pass from Dak Prescott (kick blocked), 6:05. Seahawks 16–15. **Drive: 3 play, 75 yards, 0:48.**
- SEA – Tyler Lockett 1-yard pass from Russell Wilson (Jason Myers kick), 0:07. Seahawks 23–15. **Drive: 5 play, 34 yards, 0:29.**

**Third quarter**

- SEA – Jacob Hollister 1-yard pass from Russell Wilson (Jason Myers kick), 14:14. Seahawks 30–15. **Drive: 2 play, 5 yards, 0:38.**
- DAL – Cedrick Wilson Jr. 42-yard pass from Dak Prescott (Greg Zuerlein kick), 5:47. Seahawks 30–22. **Drive: 3 play, 94 yards, 0:39.**

**Fourth quarter**

- DAL – Michael Gallup 43-yard pass from Dak Prescott (pass failed), 13:07. Seahawks 30–28. **Drive: 9 play, 89 yards, 3:22.**
- DAL – Greg Zuerlein 42-yard field goal, 3:59. Cowboys 31–30. **Drive: 16 play, 70 yards, 5:55.**
- SEA – DK Metcalf 29-yard pass from Russell Wilson (Russell Wilson-Jacob Hollister pass), 1:47. Seahawks 38–31. **Drive: 8 play, 75 yards, 2:12.**

**Top passers**

- DAL – Dak Prescott – 37/57, 473 yards, 3 TD, 2 INT
- SEA – Russell Wilson – 27/40, 315 yards, 5 TD

**Top rushers**

- DAL – Ezekiel Elliott – 14 rushes, 34 yards, TD
- SEA – Chris Carson – 14 rushes, 64 yards

**Top receivers**

- DAL – Michael Gallup – 6 receptions, 138 yards, TD
- SEA – DK Metcalf – 4 receptions, 110 yards, TD

Russell Wilson continued to play at an MVP-caliber level, throwing 5 touchdowns. The Seahawks would once again win a close game after intercepting Cowboys quarterback Dak Prescott in the endzone.

==== Week 4: at Miami Dolphins ====
Week Four: Seattle Seahawks at Miami Dolphins – Game summary

Quarter	1	2	3	4	Total
**Seahawks**	10	7	0	14	**31**
Dolphins	3	6	3	11	**23**

at Hard Rock Stadium, Miami Gardens, Florida

- Date: October 4
- Game time: 1:00 p.m. EDT/10:00 a.m. PDT
- Game weather: Cloudy, 86 °F (30 °C)
- Game attendance: 12,369
- Referee: Scott Novak
- TV announcers (Fox): Dick Stockton, Brady Quinn and Sara Walsh
- Recap, Game Book

Game information

**First quarter**

- SEA – Chris Carson 1-yard run (Jason Myers kick), 10:00. Seahawks 7–0. **Drive: 6 play, 57 yards, 2:52.**
- MIA – Jason Sanders 41-yard field goal, 2:33. Seahawks 7–3. **Drive: 9 play, 54 yards, 4:02.**
- SEA – Jason Myers 55-yard field goal, 0:07. Seahawks 10–3. **Drive: 7 play, 39 yards, 2:26.**

**Second quarter**

- MIA – Jason Sanders 29-yard field goal, 11:24. Seahawks 10–6. **Drive: 8 play, 64 yards, 3:43.**
- MIA – Jason Sanders 45-yard field goal, 0:24. Seahawks 10–9. **Drive: 10 play, 48 yards, 4:21.**
- SEA – Travis Homer 3-yard pass from Russell Wilson (Jason Myers kick), 0:03. Seahawks 17–9. **Drive: 4 play, 75 yards, 0:21.**

**Third quarter**

- MIA – Jason Sanders 43-yard field goal, 4:07. Seahawks 17–12. **Drive: 10 play, 55 yards, 5:49.**

**Fourth quarter**

- MIA – Jason Sanders 29-yard field goal, 8:31. Seahawks 17–15. **Drive: 17 play, 73 yards, 7:59.**
- SEA – David Moore 17-yard pass from Russell Wilson (Jason Myers kick), 5:24. Seahawks 24–15. **Drive: 6 play, 75 yards, 3:07.**
- SEA – Chris Carson 1-yard run (Jason Myers kick), 4:00. Seahawks 31–15. **Drive: 2 play, 33 yards, 0:16.**
- MIA – Ryan Fitzpatrick 10-yard run (Ryan Fitzpatrick-Preston Williams pass), 1:50. Seahawks 31–23. **Drive: 8 play, 75 yards, 2:10.**

**Top passers**

- SEA – Russell Wilson – 24/34, 360 yards, 2 TD, INT
- MIA – Ryan Fitzpatrick – 29/45, 315 yards, 2 INT

**Top rushers**

- SEA – Chris Carson – 16 rushes, 80 yards, 2 TD
- MIA – Ryan Fitzpatrick – 6 rushes, 47 yards, TD

**Top receivers**

- SEA – DK Metcalf – 4 receptions, 106 yards
- MIA – DeVante Parker – 10 receptions, 110 yards

This was the Seahawks' first win in Miami since 1996, when they were part of the AFC West. It also gave Russell Wilson his first win in the state of Florida.

==== Week 5: vs. Minnesota Vikings ====
Week Five: Minnesota Vikings at Seattle Seahawks – Game summary

Quarter	1	2	3	4	Total
Vikings	7	6	6	7	**26**
**Seahawks**	0	0	21	6	**27**

at CenturyLink Field, Seattle, Washington

- Date: October 11
- Game time: 5:20 p.m. PDT
- Game weather: Rain, 54 °F (12 °C)
- Game attendance: 0
- Referee: Tony Corrente
- TV announcers (NBC): Al Michaels, Cris Collinsworth, Michele Tafoya and Terry McAulay
- Recap, Game Book

Game information

**First quarter**

- MIN – Dalvin Cook 8-yard run (Dan Bailey kick), 8:48. Vikings 7–0. **Drive: 12 plays, 77 yards, 6:12.**

**Second quarter**

- MIN – Dan Bailey 52-yard field goal, 8:33. Vikings 10–0. **Drive: 17 plays, 64 yards, 10:13.**
- MIN – Dan Bailey 46-yard field goal, 0:10. Vikings 13–0. **Drive: 11 plays, 57 yards, 1:37.**

**Third quarter**

- SEA – Will Dissly 19-yard pass from Russell Wilson (Jason Myers kick), 9:55. Vikings 13–7. **Drive: 4 plays, 58 yards, 1:42.**
- SEA – DK Metcalf 13-yard pass from Russell Wilson (Jason Myers kick), 8:19. Seahawks 14–13. **Drive: 2 plays, 15 yards, 0:39.**
- SEA – Chris Carson 29-yard run (Jason Myers kick), 8:02. Seahawks 21–13. **Drive: 1 play, 29 yards, 0:07.**
- MIN – Adam Thielen 3-yard pass from Kirk Cousins (run failed), 3:39. Seahawks 21–19. **Drive: 11 plays, 77 yards, 4:23.**

**Fourth quarter**

- MIN – Adam Thielen 6-yard pass from Kirk Cousins (Dan Bailey kick), 7:08. Vikings 26–21. **Drive: 15 plays, 97 yards, 8:11.**
- SEA – DK Metcalf 6-yard pass from Russell Wilson (pass failed), 0:15. Seahawks 27–26. **Drive: 13 plays, 94 yards, 1:42.**

**Top passers**

- MIN – Kirk Cousins – 27/39, 249 yards, 2 TD, INT
- SEA – Russell Wilson – 20/32, 217 yards, 3 TD, INT

**Top rushers**

- MIN – Alexander Mattison – 20 rushes, 112 yards
- SEA – Russell Wilson – 5 rushes, 58 yards

**Top receivers**

- MIN – Adam Thielen – 9 receptions, 80 yards, 2 TD
- SEA – DK Metcalf – 6 receptions, 93 yards, 2 TD

With this win, Seattle improved to 5–0, which was also their first time in doing so in franchise history. Russell Wilson also improved to 7–0 in his career against the Vikings.

==== Week 7: at Arizona Cardinals ====
Week Seven: Seattle Seahawks at Arizona Cardinals – Game summary

Quarter	1	2	3	4	OT	Total
Seahawks	10	17	0	7	0	**34**
**Cardinals**	7	10	7	10	3	**37**

at State Farm Stadium, Glendale, Arizona

- Date: October 25
- Game time: 5:20 p.m. MST & PDT
- Game weather: Mostly sunny, 84 °F (29 °C) (retractable roof open)
- Game attendance: 1,200
- Referee: John Hussey
- TV announcers (NBC): Al Michaels, Cris Collinsworth, Michele Tafoya and Terry McAulay
- Recap, Game Book

Game information

**First quarter**

- SEA – Tyler Lockett 3-yard pass from Russell Wilson (Jason Myers kick), 11:59. Seahawks 7–0. **Drive: 6 plays, 75 yards, 3:01.**
- SEA – Jason Myers 41-yard field goal, 6:35. Seahawks 10–0. **Drive: 9 plays, 43 yards, 3:51.**
- ARI – DeAndre Hopkins 35-yard pass from Kyler Murray (Zane Gonzalez kick), 2:39. Seahawks 10–7. **Drive: 9 plays, 75 yards, 3:56.**

**Second quarter**

- SEA – Jason Myers 44-yard field goal, 12:50. Seahawks 13–7. **Drive: 9 plays, 49 yards, 4:49.**
- SEA – Carlos Hyde 24-yard run (Jason Myers kick), 4:04. Seahawks 20–7. **Drive: 6 plays, 97 yards, 2:39.**
- ARI – Christian Kirk 7-yard pass from Kyler Murray (Zane Gonzalez kick), 1:14. Seahawks 20–14. **Drive: 6 plays, 75 yards, 2:50.**
- SEA – Tyler Lockett 47-yard pass from Russell Wilson (Jason Myers kick), 0:43. Seahawks 27–14. **Drive: 3 plays, 75 yards, 0:31.**
- ARI – Zane Gonzalez 49-yard field goal, 0:00. Seahawks 27–17. **Drive: 7 plays, 44 yards, 0:43.**

**Third quarter**

- ARI – Kyler Murray 5-yard run (Zane Gonzalez kick), 2:59. Seahawks 27–24. **Drive: 12 plays, 93 yards, 5:31.**

**Fourth quarter**

- SEA – Tyler Lockett 3-yard pass from Russell Wilson (Jason Myers kick), 6:44. Seahawks 34–24. **Drive: 12 plays, 45 yards, 5:26.**
- ARI – Christian Kirk 8-yard pass from Kyler Murray (Zane Gonzalez kick), 2:28. Seahawks 34–31. **Drive: 14 plays, 75 yards, 4:16.**
- ARI – Zane Gonzalez 44-yard field goal, 0:00. Tied 34–34. **Drive: 8 plays, 54 yards, 0:52.**

**Overtime**

- ARI – Zane Gonzalez 48-yard field goal, 0:15. Cardinals 37–34. **Drive: 6 plays, 19 yards, 0:42.**

**Top passers**

- SEA – Russell Wilson – 33/50, 388 yards, 3 TD, 3 INT
- ARI – Kyler Murray – 34/48, 360 yards, 3 TD, INT

**Top rushers**

- SEA – Russell Wilson – 6 rushes, 84 yards
- ARI – Kyler Murray – 14 rushes, 67 yards, TD

**Top receivers**

- SEA – Tyler Lockett – 15 receptions, 200 yards, 3 TD
- ARI – DeAndre Hopkins – 10 receptions, 103 yards, TD

Seattle's unbeaten bid came to an end with their first loss in Arizona since the 2012 season. While Russell Wilson finished with 388 yards and 3 touchdown passes to Tyler Lockett, he also finished with three interceptions, including a costly one in overtime to Cardinals rookie linebacker Isaiah Simmons that eventually set up the decisive field goal by Zane Gonzalez. The Seahawks compiled 572 total yards of offense, the most by a losing team all season. Seattle dropped to 5–1 on the season, but still led the NFC West. This was also the Seahawks' first loss under Russell Wilson when leading by 4 or more points at halftime.

==== Week 8: vs. San Francisco 49ers ====
Week Eight: San Francisco 49ers at Seattle Seahawks – Game summary

Quarter	1	2	3	4	Total
49ers	0	7	0	20	**27**
**Seahawks**	6	7	14	10	**37**

at CenturyLink Field, Seattle, Washington

- Date: November 1
- Game time: 1:25 p.m. PST
- Game weather: Sunny, 55 °F (13 °C)
- Game attendance: 0
- Referee: Craig Wrolstad
- TV announcers (Fox): Chris Myers, Mark Schlereth and Lindsay Czarniak
- Recap, Game Book

Game information

**First quarter**

- SEA – DK Metcalf 46-yard pass from Russell Wilson (kick failed), 0:00. Seahawks 6–0. **Drive: 7 plays, 86 yards, 4:06.**

**Second quarter**

- SF – JaMycal Hasty 1-yard run (Robbie Gould kick), 6:59. 49ers 7–6. **Drive: 14 plays, 75 yards, 8:01.**
- SEA – DK Metcalf 2-yard pass from Russell Wilson (Jason Myers kick), 3:04. Seahawks 13–7. **Drive: 8 plays, 81 yards, 3:55.**

**Third quarter**

- SEA – DeeJay Dallas 2-yard pass from Russell Wilson (Jason Myers kick), 8:02. Seahawks 20–7. **Drive: 9 plays, 63 yards, 5:01.**
- SEA – David Moore 6-yard pass from Russell Wilson (Jason Myers kick), 5:51. Seahawks 27–7. **Drive: 6 plays, 21 yards, 2:07.**

**Fourth quarter**

- SEA – Jason Myers 48-yard field goal, 14:07. Seahawks 30–7. **Drive: 9 plays, 46 yards, 4:39.**
- SF – Jerick McKinnon 1-yard run (Robbie Gould kick), 9:36. Seahawks 30–14. **Drive: 11 plays, 79 yards, 4:31.**
- SF – Ross Dwelley 16-yard pass from Nick Mullens (pass failed), 4:16. Seahawks 30–20. **Drive: 6 plays, 80 yards, 2:06.**
- SEA – DeeJay Dallas 1-yard run (Jason Myers kick), 3:33. Seahawks 37–20. **Drive: 8 plays, 47 yards, 0:43.**
- SF – Brandon Aiyuk 3-yard pass from Nick Mullens (Robbie Gould kick), 1:52. Seahawks 37–27. **Drive: 9 plays, 81 yards, 1:41.**

**Top passers**

- SF – Nick Mullens – 18/25, 238 yards, 2 TD
- SEA – Russell Wilson – 27/37, 261 yards, 4 TD

**Top rushers**

- SF – JaMycal Hasty – 12 rushes, 29 yards, TD
- SEA – DeeJay Dallas – 18 rushes, 41 yards, TD

**Top receivers**

- SF – Brandon Aiyuk – 8 receptions, 91 yards, TD
- SEA – DK Metcalf – 12 receptions, 161 yards, 2 TD

The Seahawks returned home after their overtime loss at Arizona, and rebounded with a dominant win over the arch-rival San Francisco 49ers. Russell Wilson finished 27/37 with 261 yards passing and four touchdown passes, including two to DK Metcalf, who also finished with 12 catches and 161 receiving yards. With the 37–27 win, the Seahawks improved to 6–1. This was the last Seattle home game in which the name "CenturyLink Field" was used. After 9 years of using the stadium name, CenturyLink rebranded to Lumen Technologies, effectively changing the name to "Lumen Field".

==== Week 9: at Buffalo Bills ====
Week Nine: Seattle Seahawks at Buffalo Bills – Game summary

Quarter	1	2	3	4	Total
Seahawks	0	10	10	14	**34**
**Bills**	14	10	3	17	**44**

at Bills Stadium, Orchard Park, New York

- Date: November 8
- Game time: 1:00 p.m. EST/10:00 a.m. PST
- Game weather: Sunny, 69 °F (21 °C)
- Game attendance: 0
- Referee: Shawn Smith
- TV announcers (Fox): Chris Myers, Brock Huard and Jen Hale
- Recap, Game Book

Game information

**First quarter**

- BUF – Isaiah McKenzie 25-yard pass from Josh Allen (Tyler Bass kick), 13:41. Bills 7–0. **Drive: 3 plays, 45 yards, 1:25.**
- BUF – Tyler Kroft 1-yard pass from Josh Allen (Tyler Bass kick), 7:40. Bills 14–0. **Drive: 10 plays, 85 yards, 5:11.**

**Second quarter**

- BUF – Tyler Bass 44-yard field goal, 11:26. Bills 17–0. **Drive: 11 plays, 54 yards, 5:17.**
- SEA – Russell Wilson 1-yard run (Jason Myers kick), 6:45. Bills 17–7. **Drive: 8 plays, 60 yards, 4:42.**
- BUF – Gabe Davis 4-yard pass from Josh Allen (Tyler Bass kick), 4:07. Bills 24–7. **Drive: 5 plays, 75 yards, 2:37.**
- SEA – Jason Myers 45-yard field goal, 1:12. Bills 24–10. **Drive: 9 plays, 48 yards, 2:56.**

**Third quarter**

- BUF – Tyler Bass 22-yard field goal, 11:58. Bills 27–10. **Drive: 6 plays, 29 yards, 2:47.**
- SEA – DeeJay Dallas 4-yard run (Jason Myers kick), 6:40. Bills 27–17. **Drive: 11 plays, 75 yards, 5:19.**
- SEA – Jason Myers 44-yard field goal, 2:01. Bills 27–20. **Drive: 5 plays, 29 yards, 2:28.**

**Fourth quarter**

- BUF – Zack Moss 1-yard run (Tyler Bass kick), 11:33. Bills 34–20. **Drive: 9 plays, 81 yards, 5:29.**
- BUF – Josh Allen 3-yard run (Tyler Bass kick), 9:44. Bills 41–20. **Drive: 1 play, 3 yards, 0:06.**
- SEA – David Moore 55-yard pass from Russell Wilson (Jason Myers kick), 9:01. Bills 41–27. **Drive: 3 plays, 75 yards, 0:48.**
- BUF – Tyler Bass 31-yard field goal, 4:17. Bills 44–27. **Drive: 4 plays, 6 yards, 2:17.**
- SEA – DK Metcalf 7-yard pass from Russell Wilson (Jason Myers kick), 1:55. Bills 44–34. **Drive: 7 plays, 75 yards, 2:22.**

**Top passers**

- SEA – Russell Wilson – 28/41, 390 yards, 2 TD, 2 INT
- BUF – Josh Allen – 31/38, 415 yards, 3 TD

**Top rushers**

- SEA – DeeJay Dallas – 7 rushes, 31 yards, TD
- BUF – Zack Moss – 9 rushes, 18 yards, TD

**Top receivers**

- SEA – DK Metcalf – 7 receptions, 108 yards, TD
- BUF – Stefon Diggs – 9 receptions, 118 yards

The Buffalo Bills proved to be too much for the Seahawks to handle, as Buffalo's offense tore up Seattle's struggling defense behind 415 passing yards from Josh Allen. While the Seahawks would mount a comeback later in the game, pulling within seven points in the third quarter, they never led, and the Bills pulled away in the fourth. The 44–34 loss dropped Seattle to 6–2 on the season, and the 44 points surrendered were the most in the Pete Carroll era.

==== Week 10: at Los Angeles Rams ====
Week Ten: Seattle Seahawks at Los Angeles Rams – Game summary

Quarter	1	2	3	4	Total
Seahawks	7	6	0	3	**16**
**Rams**	10	7	6	0	**23**

at SoFi Stadium, Inglewood, California

- Date: November 15
- Game time: 1:25 p.m. PST
- Game weather: Sunny, 78 °F (26 °C)
- Game attendance: 0
- Referee: Clete Blakeman
- TV announcers (Fox): Joe Buck, Troy Aikman and Erin Andrews
- Recap, Game Book

Game information

**First quarter**

- LAR – Kai Forbath 23-yard field goal, 9:37. Rams 3–0. **Drive: 10 plays, 70 yards, 5:23.**
- SEA – Alex Collins 13-yard run (Jason Myers kick), 6:00. Seahawks 7–3. **Drive: 7 plays, 78 yards, 3:37.**
- LAR – Darrell Henderson 1-yard run (Kai Forbath kick), 2:24. Rams 10–7. **Drive: 7 plays, 77 yards, 3:36.**

**Second quarter**

- LAR – Malcolm Brown 7-yard run (Kai Forbath kick), 6:19. Rams 17–7, **Drive: 13 plays, 93 yards, 6:57.**
- SEA – Jason Myers 23-yard field goal, 3:45. Rams 17–10 **Drive: 6 plays, 49 yards, 2:34.**
- SEA – Jason Myers 61-yard field goal, 0:00. Rams 17–13. **Drive: 10 plays, 48 yards, 1:11.**

**Third quarter**

- LAR – Malcolm Brown 1-yard run (kick failed, wide left), 6:22. Rams 23–13. **Drive: 14 plays, 88 yards, 6:45**

**Fourth quarter**

- SEA – Jason Myers 39-yard field goal, 0:25. Rams 23–16. **Drive: 13 plays, 74 yards, 3:04.**

**Top passers**

- SEA – Russell Wilson – 22/37, 248 yards, 2 INT
- LAR – Jared Goff – 27/37, 302 yards

**Top rushers**

- SEA – Russell Wilson – 8 rushes, 60 yards
- LAR – Cam Akers – 10 rushes, 38 yards

**Top receivers**

- SEA – Tyler Lockett – 5 receptions, 66 yards
- LAR – Josh Reynolds – 8 receptions, 94 yards

==== Week 11: vs. Arizona Cardinals ====
Week Eleven: Arizona Cardinals at Seattle Seahawks – Game summary

Quarter	1	2	3	4	Total
Cardinals	0	7	7	7	**21**
**Seahawks**	7	9	7	5	**28**

at Lumen Field, Seattle, Washington

- Date: November 19
- Game time: 5:20 p.m. PST
- Game weather: Partly Cloudy, 48 °F (9 °C)
- Game attendance: 0
- Referee: Tony Corrente
- TV announcers (Fox/NFLN/Amazon Prime Video): Joe Buck, Troy Aikman, Erin Andrews and Kristina Pink
- Recap, Game Book

Game information

**First quarter**

- SEA – DK Metcalf 25-yard pass from Russell Wilson (Jason Myers kick), 8:45. Seahawks 7–0. **Drive: 12 plays, 75 yards, 6:15.**

**Second quarter**

- ARI – Kenyan Drake 2-yard run (Zane Gonzalez kick), 13:51. Tied 7–7. **Drive: 8 plays, 50 yards, 2:52.**
- SEA – Tyler Lockett 11-yard pass from Russell Wilson (kick failed), 8:27. Seahawks 13–7. **Drive: 10 plays, 75 yards, 5:24.**
- SEA – Jason Myers 27-yard field goal, 0:00. Seahawks 16–7. **Drive: 7 plays, 78 yards, 1:17.**

**Third quarter**

- ARI – Dan Arnold 4-yard pass from Kyler Murray (Zane Gonzalez kick), 10:07. Seahawks 16–14. **Drive: 11 plays, 81 yards, 4:53.**
- SEA – Carlos Hyde 2-yard run (Jason Myers kick), 5:20. Seahawks 23–14. **Drive: 8 plays, 72 yards, 4:47.**

**Fourth quarter**

- ARI – Chase Edmonds 3-yard pass from Kyler Murray (Zane Gonzalez kick), 13:19. Seahawks 23–21. **Drive: 15 plays, 90 yards, 7:01.**
- SEA – Penalty on J. R. Sweezy enforced in end zone for a safety, 9:12. Seahawks 25–21.
- SEA – Jason Myers 41-yard field goal, 2:19. Seahawks 28–21. **Drive: 12 plays, 37 yards, 6:53.**

**Top passers**

- ARI – Kyler Murray – 29/42, 269 yards, 2 TD
- SEA – Russell Wilson – 23/28, 197 yards, 2 TD

**Top rushers**

- ARI – Kenyan Drake – 11 rushes, 29 yards, TD
- SEA – Carlos Hyde – 14 rushes, 79 yards, TD

**Top receivers**

- ARI – Larry Fitzgerald – 8 receptions, 62 yards
- SEA – Tyler Lockett – 9 receptions, 67 yards, TD

Seattle's rushing attack was bolstered by the return of Carlos Hyde from injury, racking up 165 yards. Conversely, the Seahawks' much-maligned defense held Arizona's league-leading rushing offense to 57 yards, over 110 yards below its season average. The same day as the game, CenturyLink Field was renamed Lumen Field.

==== Week 12: at Philadelphia Eagles ====
Week Twelve: Seattle Seahawks at Philadelphia Eagles – Game summary

Quarter	1	2	3	4	Total
**Seahawks**	0	14	3	6	**23**
Eagles	0	6	3	8	**17**

at Lincoln Financial Field, Philadelphia, Pennsylvania

- Date: November 30
- Game time: 8:15 p.m. EST/5:15 p.m. PST
- Game weather: Rain, 60 °F (16 °C)
- Game attendance: 0
- Referee: Brad Allen
- TV announcers (ESPN): Steve Levy, Brian Griese, Louis Riddick, Lisa Salters and John Parry
- Recap, Game Book

Game information

**First quarter**

- No scoring plays.

**Second quarter**

- SEA – David Moore 1-yard pass from Russell Wilson (Jason Myers kick), 10:56. Seahawks 7–0. **Drive: 6 plays, 68 yards, 2:45.**
- SEA – Chris Carson 16-yard run (Jason Myers kick), 5:27. Seahawks 14–0. **Drive: 8 plays, 66 yards, 3:58.**
- PHI – Dallas Goedert 3-yard pass from Carson Wentz (kick failed), 0:12. Seahawks 14–6. **Drive: 16 plays, 75 yards, 5:15.**

**Third quarter**

- PHI – Jake Elliott 42-yard field goal, 7:33. Seahawks 14–9. **Drive: 12 plays, 48 yards, 5:55.**
- SEA – Jason Myers 44-yard field goal, 2:06. Seahawks 17–9. **Drive: 9 plays, 52 yards, 5:21.**

**Fourth quarter**

- SEA – Jason Myers 33-yard field goal, 11:08. Seahawks 20–9. **Drive: 6 plays, 33 yards, 2:22.**
- SEA – Jason Myers 39-yard field goal, 1:13. Seahawks 23–9. **Drive: 4 plays, 4 yards, 1:01.**
- PHI – Richard Rodgers 32-yard pass from Carson Wentz (Miles Sanders run), 0:12. Seahawks 23–17. **Drive: 4 plays, 58 yards, 0:23.**

**Top passers**

- SEA – Russell Wilson – 22/31, 230 yards, TD
- PHI – Carson Wentz – 25/45, 214 yards, 2 TD, INT

**Top rushers**

- SEA – Chris Carson – 8 rushes, 41 yards, TD
- PHI – Carson Wentz – 5 rushes, 42 yards

**Top receivers**

- SEA – DK Metcalf – 10 receptions, 177 yards
- PHI – Dallas Goedert – 7 receptions, 75 yards, TD

==== Week 13: vs. New York Giants ====
Week Thirteen: New York Giants at Seattle Seahawks – Game summary

Quarter	1	2	3	4	Total
**Giants**	0	0	14	3	**17**
Seahawks	3	2	0	7	**12**

at Lumen Field, Seattle, Washington

- Date: December 6
- Game time: 1:05 p.m. PST
- Game weather: Cloudy, 51 °F (11 °C)
- Game attendance: 0
- Referee: Craig Wrolstad
- TV announcers (Fox): Adam Amin, Mark Schlereth and Lindsay Czarniak
- Recap, Game Book

Game information

**First quarter**

- SEA – Jason Myers 31-yard field goal, 11:50. Seahawks 3–0. **Drive: 9 plays, 57 yards, 3:10**

**Second quarter**

- SEA – Punt blocked by Ryan Neal out-of-bounds in end zone, 0:28. Seahawks 5–0. **Drive: 3 plays, 6 yards, 0:20.**

**Third quarter**

- NYG – Alfred Morris 4-yard run (Colt McCoy–Sterling Shepard pass), 7:40. Giants 8–5. **Drive: 4 plays, 80 yards, 2:07.**
- NYG – Alfred Morris 6-yard pass from Colt McCoy (kick failed), 2:29. Giants 14–5. **Drive: 5 plays, 48 yards, 2:37.**

**Fourth quarter**

- NYG – Graham Gano 48-yard field goal, 9:50. Giants 17–5. **Drive: 4 plays, 9 yards, 1:31.**
- SEA – Chris Carson 28-yard pass from Russell Wilson (Jason Myers kick), 6:09. Giants 17–12. **Drive: 11 plays, 82 yards, 3:41.**

**Top passers**

- NYG – Colt McCoy – 13/22, 105 yards, TD, INT
- SEA – Russell Wilson – 27/43, 236 yards, TD, INT

**Top rushers**

- NYG – Wayne Gallman – 16 rushes, 135 yards
- SEA – Chris Carson – 13 rushes, 65 yards

**Top receivers**

- NYG – Evan Engram – 4 receptions, 32 yards
- SEA – DK Metcalf – 5 receptions, 80 yards

With the shocking loss, the Seahawks dropped to 8–4 and picked up their final loss of the season. This is also the only time during the regular season where the Seahawks lost a game at home.

==== Week 14: vs. New York Jets ====
Week Fourteen: New York Jets at Seattle Seahawks – Game summary

Quarter	1	2	3	4	Total
Jets	3	0	0	0	**3**
**Seahawks**	7	16	14	3	**40**

at Lumen Field, Seattle, Washington

- Date: December 13
- Game time: 1:05 p.m. PST
- Game weather: Cloudy, 43 °F (6 °C)
- Game attendance: 0
- Referee: Scott Novak
- TV announcers (CBS): Greg Gumbel, Rich Gannon and Jay Feely
- Recap, Game Book

Game information

**First quarter**

- NYJ – Sergio Castillo 45-yard field goal, 10:21. Jets 3–0. **Drive: 9 plays, 48 yards, 4:39.**
- SEA – Freddie Swain 19-yard pass from Russell Wilson (Jason Myers kick), 7:16. Seahawks 7–3. **Drive: 6 plays, 75 yards, 3:05.**

**Second quarter**

- SEA – DK Metcalf 5-yard pass from Russell Wilson (Jason Myers kick), 14:56. Seahawks 14–3. **Drive: 8 plays, 70 yards, 2:52.**
- SEA – Jason Myers 41-yard field goal, 12:35. Seahawks 17–3. **Drive: 4 plays, 9 yards, 2:11.**
- SEA – Chris Carson 5-yard run (kick failed), 0:32. Seahawks 23–3. **Drive: 9 plays, 69 yards, 1:56.**

**Third quarter**

- SEA – Will Dissly 10-yard pass from Russell Wilson (Jason Myers kick), 8:33. Seahawks 30–3. **Drive: 11 plays, 75 yards, 6:27.**
- SEA – David Moore 3-yard pass from Russell Wilson (Jason Myers kick), 2:57. Seahawks 37–3. **Drive: 7 plays, 40 yards, 3:56.**

**Fourth quarter**

- SEA – Jason Myers 29-yard field goal, 3:49. Seahawks 40–3. **Drive: 13 plays, 54 yards, 8:06.**

**Top passers**

- NYJ – Sam Darnold – 14/26, 132 yards
- SEA – Russell Wilson – 21/27, 206 yards, 4 TD, INT

**Top rushers**

- NYJ – Josh Adams – 6 rushes, 27 yards
- SEA – Chris Carson – 12 rushes, 76 yards, TD

**Top receivers**

- NYJ – Braxton Berrios – 3 receptions, 49 yards
- SEA – DK Metcalf – 6 receptions, 61 yards, 1 TD

==== Week 15: at Washington Football Team ====
Week Fifteen: Seattle Seahawks at Washington Football Team – Game summary

Quarter	1	2	3	4	Total
**Seahawks**	3	10	7	0	**20**
Washington	0	3	0	12	**15**

at FedExField, Landover, Maryland

- Date: December 20
- Game time: 1:00 p.m. EST/10:00 a.m. PST
- Game weather: Cloudy, 43 °F (6 °C)
- Game attendance: 0
- Referee: Adrian Hill
- TV announcers (Fox): Kenny Albert, Jonathan Vilma and Shannon Spake
- Recap, Game Book

Game information

**First quarter**

- SEA – Jason Myers 43-yard field goal, 8:50. Seahawks 3–0. **Drive: 8 plays, 30 yards, 4:00.**

**Second quarter**

- SEA – Jason Myers 40-yard field goal, 10:52. Seahawks 6–0. **Drive: 10 plays, 47 yards, 4:21.**
- SEA – Jacob Hollister 10-yard pass from Russell Wilson (Jason Myers kick), 1:45. Seahawks 13–0. **Drive: 10 plays, 97 yards, 5:05.**
- WAS – Dustin Hopkins 48-yard field goal, 0:06. Seahawks 13–3. **Drive: 11 plays, 46 yards, 1:39.**

**Third quarter**

- SEA – Carlos Hyde 50-yard run (Jason Myers kick), 13:12. Seahawks 20–3. **Drive: 4 plays, 75 yards, 1:48.**

**Fourth quarter**

- WAS – Peyton Barber 1-yard run (kick failed), 14:14. Seahawks 20–9. **Drive: 14 plays, 96 yards, 5:50.**
- WAS – J. D. McKissic 6-yard pass from Dwayne Haskins (run failed), 7:16. Seahawks 20–15. **Drive: 11 plays, 64 yards, 3:57.**

**Top passers**

- SEA – Russell Wilson – 18/27, 121 yards, TD, INT
- WAS – Dwayne Haskins – 38/55, 295 yards, TD, 2 INT

**Top rushers**

- SEA – Chris Carson – 15 rushes, 63 yards
- WAS – J. D. McKissic – 13 rushes, 51 yards

**Top receivers**

- SEA – DK Metcalf – 5 receptions, 43 yards
- WAS – Logan Thomas – 13 receptions, 101 yards

Despite a close-scoring game, the Seahawks held on to win to clinch a playoff berth. Seattle took sole possession of first place in the division with the Rams' surprising loss to the then-winless New York Jets later that day.

==== Week 16: vs. Los Angeles Rams ====
Week Sixteen: Los Angeles Rams at Seattle Seahawks – Game summary

Quarter	1	2	3	4	Total
Rams	3	3	0	3	**9**
**Seahawks**	0	6	7	7	**20**

at Lumen Field, Seattle, Washington

- Date: December 27
- Game time: 1:25 p.m. PST
- Game weather: Cloudy, 45 °F (7 °C)
- Game attendance: 0
- Referee: Bill Vinovich
- TV announcers (Fox): Joe Buck, Troy Aikman and Erin Andrews
- Recap, Game Book

Game information

**First quarter**

- LAR – Matt Gay 44-yard field goal, 6:17. Rams 3–0. **Drive: 14 plays, 62 yards, 5:57.**

**Second quarter**

- SEA – Jason Myers 45-yard field goal, 12:43. Tied 3–3. **Drive: 9 plays, 34 yards, 3:01.**
- LAR – Matt Gay 51-yard field goal, 9:33. Rams 6–3. **Drive: 10 plays, 42 yards, 3:10.**
- SEA – Jason Myers 49-yard field goal, 1:04. Tied 6–6. **Drive: 9 plays, 34 yards, 2:27.**

**Third quarter**

- SEA – Russell Wilson 3-yard run (Jason Myers kick), 10:32. Seahawks 13–6. **Drive: 7 plays, 70 yards, 4:28.**

**Fourth quarter**

- LAR – Matt Gay 33-yard field goal, 12:49. Seahawks 13–9. **Drive: 10 plays, 29 yards, 4:16.**
- SEA – Jacob Hollister 13-yard pass from Russell Wilson (Jason Myers kick), 2:51. Seahawks 20–9. **Drive: 9 plays, 80 yards, 4:29.**

**Top passers**

- LAR – Jared Goff – 24/43, 234 yards, INT
- SEA – Russell Wilson – 20/32, 225 yards, TD

**Top rushers**

- LAR – Darrell Henderson – 12 rushes, 62 yards
- SEA – Chris Carson – 16 rushes, 69 yards

**Top receivers**

- LAR – Cooper Kupp – 8 receptions, 66 yards
- SEA – DK Metcalf – 6 receptions, 59 yards

With the win, the Seahawks clinched the NFC West title for the first time since 2016. They won all three home games against their NFC West opponents for the first time since 2014 and finished 7–1 at home in the regular season, which is also their best home record since 2016. This would be their last division title until 2025.

==== Week 17: at San Francisco 49ers ====
Week Seventeen: Seattle Seahawks at San Francisco 49ers – Game summary

Quarter	1	2	3	4	Total
**Seahawks**	3	3	0	20	**26**
49ers	0	3	6	14	**23**

at State Farm Stadium, Glendale, Arizona

- Date: January 3, 2021
- Game time: 2:25 p.m. MST/1:25 p.m. PST
- Game weather: Partly cloudy, 62 °F (17 °C) (retractable roof open)
- Game attendance: 0
- Referee: Tony Corrente
- TV announcers (Fox): Kenny Albert, Jonathan Vilma and Shannon Spake
- Recap, Game Book

Game information

**First quarter**

- SEA – Jason Myers 36-yard field goal, 2:09. Seahawks 3–0. **Drive: 10 plays, 51 yards, 4:27.**

**Second quarter**

- SEA – Jason Myers 30-yard field goal, 9:27. Seahawks 6–0. **Drive: 12 plays, 58 yards, 6:03.**
- SF – Tristan Vizcaino 36-yard field goal, 0:25. Seahawks 6–3. **Drive: 10 plays, 61 yards, 6:11.**

**Third quarter**

- SF – Tristan Vizcaino 47-yard field goal, 9:31. Tied 6–6. **Drive: 10 plays, 53 yards, 5:29.**
- SF – Tristan Vizcaino 33-yard field goal, 6:19. 49ers 9–6. **Drive: 5 plays, 34 yards, 2:11.**

**Fourth quarter**

- SF – Jeff Wilson 7-yard run (Tristan Vizcaino kick), 14:22. 49ers 16–6. **Drive: 11 plays, 73 yards, 5:44.**
- SEA – Tyler Lockett 6-yard pass from Russell Wilson (kick failed), 10:54. 49ers 16–12. **Drive: 8 plays, 75 yards, 3:28.**
- SEA – Tyler Lockett 4-yard pass from Russell Wilson (Jason Myers kick), 2:20. Seahawks 19–16. **Drive: 14 plays, 85 yards, 5:26.**
- SEA – Alex Collins 8-yard run (Jason Myers kick), 1:49. Seahawks 26–16. **Drive: 3 plays, 17 yards, 0:21.**
- SF – Jeff Wilson 3-yard pass from C. J. Beathard (Tristan Vizcaino kick), 0:23. Seahawks 26–23. **Drive: 8 plays, 75 yards, 1:26.**

**Top passers**

- SEA – Russell Wilson – 20/36, 181 yards, 2 TD
- SF – C. J. Beathard – 25/37, 273 yards, TD

**Top rushers**

- SEA – Chris Carson – 11 rushes, 44 yards
- SF – Jeff Wilson – 20 rushes, 76 yards, TD

**Top receivers**

- SEA – Tyler Lockett – 12 receptions, 90 yards, 2 TD
- SF – Kendrick Bourne – 5 receptions, 76 yards

Trying to take the first round bye away from the Packers and Saints, the Seahawks did win to get a chance at a bye, but due to the Packers beating the Bears and the Saints' win against Carolina, the Hawks were relegated to the 3rd seed.

=== Standings ===
==== Division ====
NFC West
	W	L	T	PCT	DIV	CONF	PF	PA	STK
^{(3)} Seattle Seahawks	12	4	0	.750	4–2	9–3	459	371	W4
^{(6)} Los Angeles Rams	10	6	0	.625	3–3	9–3	372	296	W1
Arizona Cardinals	8	8	0	.500	2–4	6–6	410	367	L2
San Francisco 49ers	6	10	0	.375	3–3	4–8	376	390	L1

==== Conference ====
NFC
#	Team	Division	W	L	T	PCT	DIV	CONF	SOS	SOV	STK
**Division leaders**
1	Green Bay Packers	North	13	3	0	.813	5–1	10–2	.428	.387	W6
2 (Note: New Orleans finished ahead of Seattle based on conference record.)	New Orleans Saints	South	12	4	0	.750	6–0	10–2	.459	.406	W2
3	Seattle Seahawks	West	12	4	0	.750	4–2	9–3	.447	.404	W4
4	Washington Football Team	East	7	9	0	.438	4–2	5–7	.459	.388	W1
**Wild cards**
5	Tampa Bay Buccaneers	South	11	5	0	.688	4–2	8–4	.488	.392	W4
6	Los Angeles Rams	West	10	6	0	.625	3–3	9–3	.494	.484	W1
7 (Note: Chicago finished and clinched the 7th and final playoff spot ahead of Arizona based on better win percentage in common games (against Detroit, the NY Giants, Carolina, and the LA Rams, Chicago finished 3–2, while Arizona finished 1–4).)	Chicago Bears	North	8	8	0	.500	2–4	6–6	.488	.336	L1
**Did not qualify for the postseason**
8	Arizona Cardinals	West	8	8	0	.500	2–4	6–6	.475	.441	L2
9	Minnesota Vikings	North	7	9	0	.438	4–2	5–7	.504	.366	W1
10 (Note: San Francisco finished ahead of the NY Giants based on head-to-head victory. Division tie break was initially used to eliminate Dallas (see below).)	San Francisco 49ers	West	6	10	0	.375	3–3	4–8	.549	.448	L1
11 (Note: NY Giants won tiebreaker over Dallas based on division record.)	New York Giants	East	6	10	0	.375	4–2	5–7	.502	.427	W1
12	Dallas Cowboys	East	6	10	0	.375	2–4	5–7	.471	.333	L1
13 (Note: Carolina finished ahead of Detroit based on head-to-head victory.)	Carolina Panthers	South	5	11	0	.313	1–5	4–8	.531	.388	L1
14	Detroit Lions	North	5	11	0	.313	1–5	4–8	.508	.350	L4
15	Philadelphia Eagles	East	4	11	1	.281	2–4	4–8	.537	.469	L3
16	Atlanta Falcons	South	4	12	0	.250	1–5	2–10	.551	.391	L5
**Tiebreakers** (Note: When breaking ties for three or more teams under the NFL's rules, they are first broken within divisions, then comparing only the highest-ranked remaining team from each division.)

== Postseason ==
=== Schedule ===
Round	Date	Opponent (seed)	Result	Record	Venue	Recap
Wild Card	January 9, 2021	Los Angeles Rams (6)	L 20–30	0–1	Lumen Field	Recap

=== Game summaries ===
==== NFC Wild Card Playoffs: vs. (6) Los Angeles Rams ====
NFC Wild Card Playoffs: (6) Los Angeles Rams at (3) Seattle Seahawks – Game summary

Quarter	1	2	3	4	Total
Rams	3	17	0	10	30
Seahawks	0	10	3	7	20

at Lumen Field, Seattle, Washington

- Date: January 9, 2021
- Game time: 1:40 p.m. PST
- Game weather: Cloudy, 39 °F (4 °C)
- Game attendance: 0
- Referee: John Hussey
- TV announcers (Fox): Joe Buck, Troy Aikman, Erin Andrews and Tom Rinaldi
- Recap, Game Book

Game information

First quarter

- LAR – Matt Gay 40-yard field goal, 3:52. Rams 3–0. Drive: 12 plays, 58 yards, 6:28.

Second quarter

- SEA – Jason Myers 50-yard field goal, 10:29. Tied 3–3. Drive: 5 plays, 19 yards, 1:50.
- LAR – Matt Gay 39-yard field goal, 7:51. Rams 6–3. Drive: 6 plays, 54 yards, 2:38.
- LAR – Darious Williams 42-yard interception return (Matt Gay kick), 6:40. Rams 13–3.
- SEA – DK Metcalf 51-yard pass from Russell Wilson (Jason Myers kick), 3:43. Rams 13–10. Drive: 5 plays, 74 yards, 2:57.
- LAR – Cam Akers 5-yard run (Matt Gay kick), 1:57. Rams 20–10. Drive: 5 plays, 75 yards, 1:46.

Third quarter

- SEA – Jason Myers 52-yard field goal, 13:45. Rams 20–13. Drive: 4 plays, 7 yards, 1:15.

Fourth quarter

- LAR – Matt Gay 36-yard field goal, 11:33. Rams 23–13. Drive: 9 plays, 52 yards, 5:07.
- LAR – Robert Woods 15-yard pass from Jared Goff (Matt Gay kick), 4:46. Rams 30–13. Drive: 4 plays, 36 yards, 2:16.
- SEA – DK Metcalf 12-yard pass from Russell Wilson (Jason Myers kick), 2:28. Rams 30–20. Drive: 8 plays, 76 yards, 2:18.

Top passers

- LAR – Jared Goff – 9/19, 155 yards, TD
- SEA – Russell Wilson – 11/27, 174 yards, 2 TD, INT

Top rushers

- LAR – Cam Akers – 28 rushes, 131 yards, TD
- SEA – Chris Carson – 16 rushes, 77 yards

Top receivers

- LAR – Cooper Kupp – 4 receptions, 78 yards
- SEA – DK Metcalf – 5 receptions, 96 yards, 2 TD

With their first home playoff loss since 2004, the Seahawks season came to an end. This would be their last home playoff game until 2025 & their last playoff game until 2022.
