= Sebastian Joseph-Day =

American football player (born 1995)

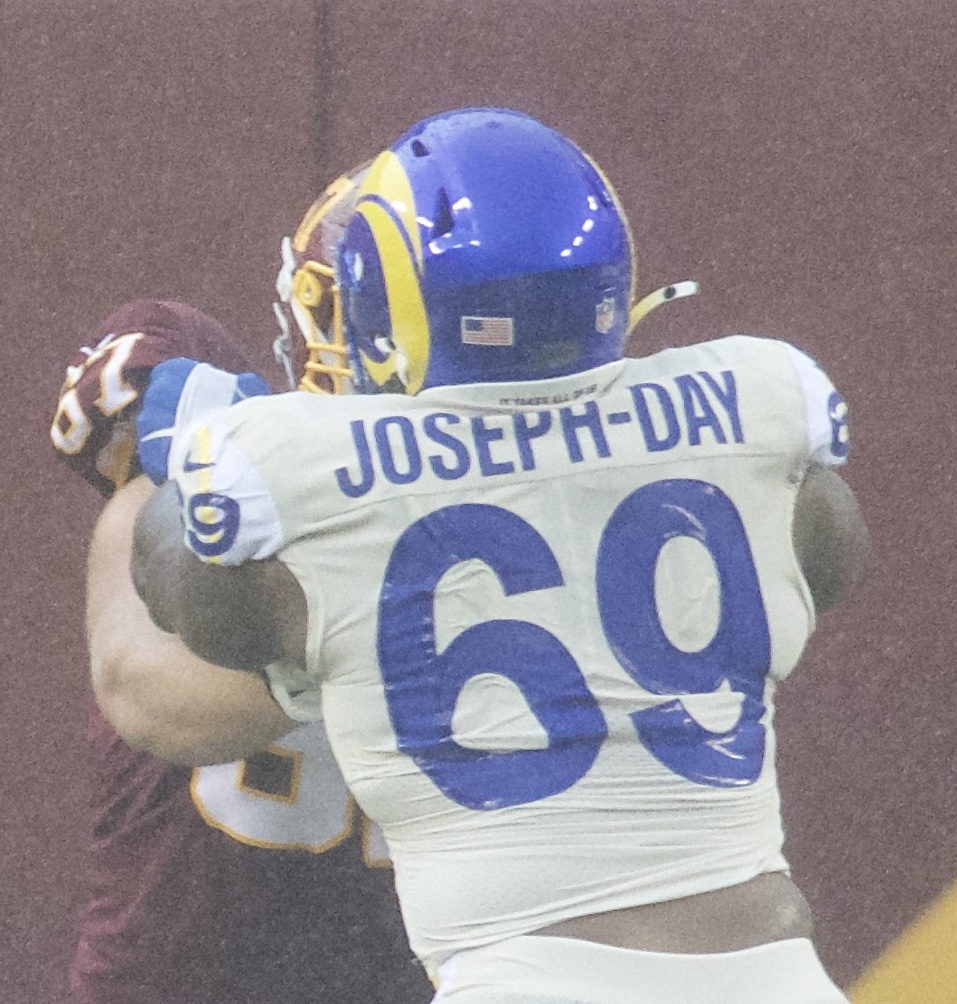
- Joseph-Day with the Los Angeles Rams in 2021

No. 69 – Pittsburgh Steelers
- Position: Nose tackle
- Roster status: Injured reserve

Personal information
- Born: March 21, 1995 (age 31); Stroudsburg, Pennsylvania, U.S.
- Listed height: 6 ft 4 in (1.93 m)
- Listed weight: 310 lb (141 kg)

Career information
- High school: Stroudsburg
- College: Rutgers (2013–2017)
- NFL draft: 2018: 6th round, 195th overall pick

Career history
- Los Angeles Rams (2018–2021); Los Angeles Chargers (2022–2023); San Francisco 49ers (2023); Tennessee Titans (2024–2025); Pittsburgh Steelers (2026–present)

Awards and highlights
- Super Bowl champion (LVI)

Career NFL statistics as of 2026
- Total tackles: 324
- Sacks: 15.5
- Forced fumbles: 2
- Fumble recoveries: 3
- Pass deflections: 6
- Interceptions: 1
- Stats at Pro Football Reference

Sebastian Joseph-Day (born March 21, 1995) is an American professional football nose tackle for the Pittsburgh Steelers of the National Football League (NFL). He played college football for the Rutgers Scarlet Knights. He has previously played in the NFL for the Los Angeles Rams (with whom he won Super Bowl LVI), Los Angeles Chargers, San Francisco 49ers, and Tennessee Titans.

== Early life ==
Joseph-Day was born in Stroudsburg, Pennsylvania on March 21, 1995. He attended and played high school football at Stroudsburg High School in Stroudsburg, Pennsylvania, which competes in the highly-regarded Eastern Pennsylvania Conference, one of the premiere high school athletic conferences in the nation. He played for the Stroudsburg High School Mountaineers under head coach Joe Bernard, and was ranked the 30th-best prospect out Pennsylvania by Rivals.com.

Prior to choosing to commit to Rutgers to play college football, he received offers from Connecticut, Maryland, and Temple.

== College career ==
Joseph-Day attended and played college football for Rutgers University from 2013 to 2017 under head coaches Kyle Flood and Chris Ash. In the 2013 season, he appeared in one game, which came against Norfolk State, and recorded one tackle. He ended up redshirting after suffering an injury. In the 2014 season, he appeared in three games and recorded three total tackles on the season. He saw an expanded role in the 2015 season. He appeared in 11 games and recorded 22 total tackles, 5.5 tackles-for-loss, one sack, and one fumble recovery. In the 2016 season, he appeared in 11 games and recorded 29 total tackles, 3.5 tackles-for-loss, one sack, one pass defensed, and one forced fumble. In his final collegiate season in 2017, he started all 12 games at nose tackle, recording 35 total tackles, 4.5 tackles-for-loss, 1.5 sacks, one pass defensed, and one forced fumble. He was voted Honorable Mention All-Big Ten for his efforts.

== Professional career ==
Pre-draft measurables
Height	Weight	Arm length	Hand span	Wingspan	40-yard dash	10-yard split	20-yard split	20-yard shuttle	Three-cone drill	Vertical jump	Broad jump	Bench press
6 ft 3 in (1.91 m)	299 lb (136 kg)	34 1/2 in (0.88 m)	10 5/8 in (0.27 m)	6 ft 10 1/2 in (2.10 m)	4.97 s	1.68 s	2.75 s	4.56 s	7.40 s	31.5 in (0.80 m)	9 ft 4 in (2.84 m)	24 reps
All values from Rutgers Pro Day

=== Los Angeles Rams ===
Joseph-Day was selected by the Los Angeles Rams in the sixth round (195th overall) of the 2018 NFL draft. He was the second member of the Scarlet Knights selected that year after Kemoko Turay went to the Indianapolis Colts in the second round.

After being inactive for every game as a rookie, Joseph-Day was named a full-time starter in 2019. In the 2019 season, he finished with two sacks, 44 total tackles, and one pass defended. In the 2020 season, he finished with one sack, 55 total tackles, three passes defended, and one forced fumble.

On November 5, 2021, Joseph-Day was placed on injured reserve after undergoing surgery for a torn pectoral. He finished the 2021 regular season with three sacks and 38 total tackles in seven games. He was activated off injured reserve on February 11, 2022, in time for Super Bowl LVI. The Rams won 23–20 against the Cincinnati Bengals.

=== Los Angeles Chargers ===
On March 16, 2022, Joseph-Day signed a three-year, $24 million contract with the Los Angeles Chargers. In Week 7, against the Seattle Seahawks, he recorded a safety when he and teammate Troy Reeder tackled Kenneth Walker III in the end zone. On December 7, Joseph-Day was diagnosed with an MCL sprain. In the 2022 season, he appeared in 16 games. He finished with two sacks, 56 total tackles, one interception, one pass defended, and one forced fumble. On December 22, 2023, he was cut by the Chargers.

=== San Francisco 49ers ===
On December 27, 2023, Joseph-Day signed with the San Francisco 49ers. He was a member of the 49ers team that appeared in Super Bowl LVIII in February 2024, representing his second Super Bowl appearance during his NFL career to date.

=== Tennessee Titans ===
On March 20, 2024, Joseph-Day signed with the Tennessee Titans. He appeared in all 17 games during the 2024 season, including 12 starts. He finished with 44 tackles, 2.5 sacks, and a pass deflection.

On March 13, 2025, the Titans re-signed Joseph-Day to a one-year, $5 million contract. In the 2025 season, he had two sacks, 41 tackles, and one fumble recovery.

=== Pittsburgh Steelers ===
On March 16, 2026, Joseph-Day signed with the Pittsburgh Steelers on a two-year, $11 million contract.

== Career statistics ==
=== NFL ===
Legend
	Won the Super Bowl
	Led the league
**Bold**	Career high

==== Regular season ====
Year	Team	Games		Tackles						Interceptions						Fumbles			
Year	Team	GP	GS	Cmb	Solo	Ast	Sck	TFL	Sfty	PD	Int	Yds	Avg	Lng	TD	FF	FR	Yds	TD
2018	LAR	DNP																	
2019	LAR	16	15	44	25	19	2.0	5	0	1	—	—	—	—	—	—	—	—	—
2020	LAR	16	16	55	**35**	20	1.0	1	0	**3**	—	—	—	—	—	**1**	—	—	—
2021	LAR	7	7	38	23	15	**3.0**	3	0	0	—	—	—	—	—	—	—	—	—
2022	LAC	16	16	**56**	27	**29**	2.0	**9**	**1**	1	**1**	**4**	**4.0**	**4**	**0**	**1**	**1**	**0**	**0**
2023	LAC	14	14	31	15	16	**3.0**	3	0	0	—	—	—	—	—	—	—	—	—
2023	SF	2	0	5	4	1	0.0	0	0	0	—	—	—	—	—	—	—	—	—
2024	TEN	17	12	44	18	26	2.5	3	0	1	—	—	—	—	—	—	—	—	—
2025	TEN	17	10	41	22	19	2.0	6	0	0	—	—	—	—	—	—	**1**	**0**	**0**
2026	PIT	6	0	10	3	7	0.0	1	0	0	—	—	—	—	—	—	**1**	**0**	**0**
Career		111	90	324	172	152	15.5	31	1	6	1	4	4.0	4	0	2	3	0	0

==== Postseason ====
Year	Team	Games		Tackles						Interceptions						Fumbles			
Year	Team	GP	GS	Cmb	Solo	Ast	Sck	TFL	Sfty	PD	Int	Yds	Avg	Lng	TD	FF	FR	Yds	TD
2020	LAR	2	2	**8**	**2**	**6**	0.0	0	0	0	—	—	—	—	—	—	—	—	—
2021	LAR	1	0	0	0	0	0.0	0	0	0	—	—	—	—	—	—	—	—	—
2022	LAC	1	1	3	1	2	**0.5**	0	0	**1**	—	—	—	—	—	—	—	—	—
2023	SF	3	0	3	**2**	1	0.0	0	0	0	—	—	—	—	—	—	—	—	—
Career		7	3	14	5	9	0.5	0	0	1	—	—	—	—	—	—	—	—	—

=== College ===
Season	Team	Conf	Class	Pos	GP	Tackles					Fumbles	
Season	Team	Conf	Class	Pos	GP	Cmb	Solo	Ast	TfL	Sck	FR	FF
2013	Rutgers	American	FR	DL	1	1	1	0	1.0	0.0	0	0
2014	Rutgers	Big Ten	RS/FR	DL	3	3	0	3	0.0	0.0	0	0
2015	Rutgers	Big Ten	SO	DL	11	22	15	7	5.5	1.0	1	0
2016	Rutgers	Big Ten	JR	DL	11	29	13	16	3.5	1.0	0	1
2017	Rutgers	Big Ten	SR	DL	11	35	18	17	4.5	1.5	0	1
Career					37	90	47	43	14.5	3.5	1	2

== Personal life ==
Joseph-Day is a Christian. He is married to Rachel Joseph-Day. They have one son.

Joseph-Day appeared with Mike Tyson as a fill-in co-host on his podcast "Hotboxin' with Mike Tyson". The opportunity to continue co-hosting was offered and accepted. Joseph-Day hosts a restaurant tour series on his YouTube channel called "Dine n' Bash". In July 2021, he launched a charitable initiative called "Bashing Hunger." The effort is designed to combat food insecurity by raising awareness of the issue, increasing food rescue to feed people without enough food, and providing nutritional education.

On March 27, 2023, Joseph-Day accused Transportation Security Administration (TSA) agents of sexually assaulting him at John Wayne Airport in Santa Ana, California.
