= Justin Hollins =

American football player (born 1996)

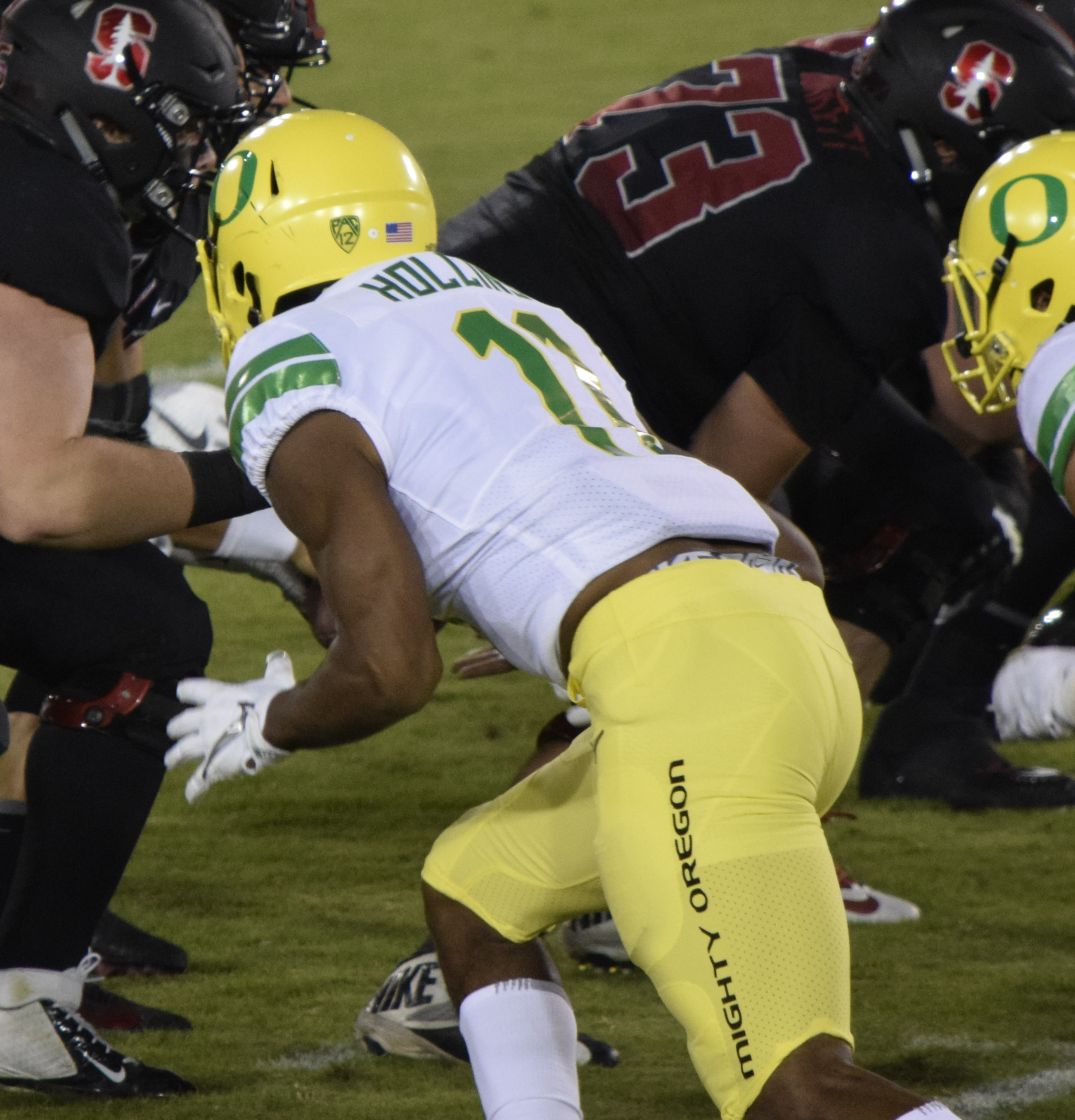
- Hollins with the Oregon Ducks in 2017

Profile
- Position: Defensive end

Personal information
- Born: January 15, 1996 (age 30); Arlington, Texas, U.S.
- Listed height: 6 ft 5 in (1.96 m)
- Listed weight: 248 lb (112 kg)

Career information
- High school: Martin (Arlington)
- College: Oregon (2014–2018)
- NFL draft: 2019: 5th round, 156th overall pick

Career history
- Denver Broncos (2019); Los Angeles Rams (2020–2022); Green Bay Packers (2022–2023); New York Giants (2023)*; Los Angeles Chargers (2023); Washington Commanders (2024)*; Buffalo Bills (2025)*
- * Offseason or practice squad member only

Awards and highlights
- Super Bowl champion (LVI)

Career NFL statistics as of 2023
- Tackles: 123
- Sacks: 10.5
- Forced fumbles: 3
- Fumble recoveries: 1
- Pass deflections: 3
- Stats at Pro Football Reference

Justin Hollins (born January 15, 1996) is an American professional football defensive end. He played college football for the Oregon Ducks as an outside linebacker and was selected by the Denver Broncos in the fifth round of the 2019 NFL draft. He has also played for the Los Angeles Rams, Green Bay Packers, New York Giants, Los Angeles Chargers, and Washington Commanders.

== Early life ==
Hollins was born on January 15, 1996, in Arlington, Texas. He attended Grace Preparatory Academy before transferring to Martin High School and graduating in his senior year. At Martin, Hollins played on the same defensive line as future 2017 NFL draft first-overall pick Myles Garrett and recorded 59 tackles and four sacks. He was rated a three-star prospect by several recruiting services and committed to play college football at the University of Oregon over offers from over a dozen schools, including Oklahoma, Baylor, Oklahoma State and Iowa.

== College career ==
Hollins played five seasons for the Oregon Ducks, redshirting his sophomore season. Hollins became a starter on the defensive line for the Ducks following his redshirt season, making 51 total tackles and finishing second on the team in both tackles for loss (9.5) and sacks (3). He recorded 59 tackles, 11.5 for a loss, with 4.5 sacks and an interception returned for a touchdown in his redshirt junior season. As a redshirt senior, Hollins was named first-team All-Pac-12 after making 64 total tackles, including 14.5 for loss, 6.5 sacks, five forced fumbles, an interception and six passes defended. He was the only player in Football Bowl Subdivision to have at least five sacks, five forced fumbles and one interception. Hollins finished his collegiate career with 184 total tackles (36 for loss), 14 sacks, two interceptions seven forced fumbles and three fumble recoveries. After the season, Hollins was invited to participate in the 2019 East–West Shrine Game and was named the game's defensive MVP after making 10 tackles, three of which were for a loss and two of which were sacks.

== Professional career ==
Pre-draft measurables
Height	Weight	Arm length	Hand span	40-yard dash	10-yard split	20-yard split	20-yard shuttle	Three-cone drill	Vertical jump	Broad jump	Bench press
6 ft 5 1/4 in (1.96 m)	248 lb (112 kg)	33 3/8 in (0.85 m)	10 3/8 in (0.26 m)	4.50 s	1.54 s	2.66 s	4.40 s	7.06 s	36.5 in (0.93 m)	9 ft 11 in (3.02 m)	25 reps
All values from NFL Combine

=== Denver Broncos ===
Hollins was selected by the Denver Broncos in the fifth round (156th overall) of the 2019 NFL draft. The Broncos acquired this selection by trading Trevor Siemian to the Minnesota Vikings. Hollins signed a four-year rookie contract that included $300,000 in guaranteed money on May 14, 2019.

Hollins made his NFL debut on September 9, 2019, against the Oakland Raiders. Hollins recorded the first career sack on November 3, 2019, against the Cleveland Browns. Hollins finished his rookie season with 21 tackles, one sack and two passes defended in 15 games played.

On September 5, 2020, Hollins was waived by the Broncos.

=== Los Angeles Rams ===
On September 6, 2020, Hollins was claimed off waivers by the Los Angeles Rams. In Week 4 against the New York Giants, Hollins recorded his first sack as a Ram during the 17–9 win. In Week 13 against the Arizona Cardinals, Hollins recorded a strip sack on Kyler Murray that was recovered by the Rams during the 38–28 win.

In Week 3 of the 2021 season, Hollins suffered a partially torn pec and was placed on injured reserve on September 27, 2021. He was activated on December 13. Hollins reached Super Bowl LVI where the Rams defeated the Cincinnati Bengals 23–20. Hollins had one tackle in the game. He was waived by the Rams on November 22, 2022.

=== Green Bay Packers ===
On November 24, 2022, Hollins was claimed off waivers by the Green Bay Packers. On March 23, 2023, Hollins was re-signed by the Packers on a one-year, $1.2 million deal. He was released on October 21, 2023.

=== New York Giants ===
On October 24, 2023, the New York Giants signed Hollins to their practice squad.

=== Los Angeles Chargers ===
On November 15, 2023, Hollins was signed by the Los Angeles Chargers off the Giants practice squad.

=== Washington Commanders ===
On August 19, 2024, Hollins signed with the Washington Commanders. He was released on August 27, 2024, and re-signed to their practice squad on September 19, 2024. He was released on October 8, 2024.

=== Buffalo Bills ===
On August 5, 2025, Hollins signed with the Buffalo Bills. He was placed on injured reserve on August 14, and released on August 19.

== NFL career statistics ==
=== Regular season ===
Year	Team	Games		Tackles				Interceptions						Fumbles	
Year	Team	GP	GS	Cmb	Solo	Ast	Sck	Int	Yds	TD	PD	FF	FR	Yds	TD
2019	DEN	15	0	21	12	9	1	2	0	0	0	0	0	0	0
2020	LAR	16	0	28	18	10	3	1	0	0	0	0	0	1	0
2021	LAR	8	2	22	14	8	2	0	0	0	0	0	0	1	0
2022	LAR	10	5	26	15	11	1	0	0	0	0	0	0	1	1
2022	GB	6	0	9	4	5	2.5	0	0	0	0	0	0	0	0
2023	GB	4	0	9	5	4	0	0	0	0	0	0	0	0	0
2023	NYG	1	0	0	0	0	0	0	0	0	0	0	0	0	0
2023	LAC	7	0	8	6	2	1	0	0	0	0	0	0	0	0
Career		67	7	123	74	49	10.5	3	0	0	0	0	0	3	1

=== Postseason ===
Year	Team	Games		Tackles				Interceptions						Fumbles	
Year	Team	GP	GS	Cmb	Solo	Ast	Sck	Int	Yds	TD	PD	FF	FR	Yds	TD
2020	LAR	2	0	6	4	2	0	0	0	0	0	0	0	0	0
2021	LAR	4	0	2	1	1	0	0	0	0	0	0	0	0	0
Career		4	0	8	5	3	0	0	0	0	0	0	0	0	0
