= Bobby Brown III =

American football player (born 2000)

No. 97 – Carolina Panthers
- Position: Defensive tackle
- Roster status: Active

Personal information
- Born: August 7, 2000 (age 26); Bruce, Mississippi, U.S.
- Listed height: 6 ft 4 in (1.93 m)
- Listed weight: 330 lb (150 kg)

Career information
- High school: Lamar (Arlington, Texas)
- College: Texas A&M (2018–2020)
- NFL draft: 2021: 4th round, 117th overall pick

Career history
- Los Angeles Rams (2021–2024); Carolina Panthers (2025–present)

Awards and highlights
- Super Bowl champion (LVI); First-team All-SEC (2020)

Career NFL statistics as of Week 4, 2026
- Total tackles: 118
- Sacks: 1.0
- Pass deflections: 3
- Stats at Pro Football Reference

Bobby Brown III (born August 7, 2000) is an American professional football defensive tackle for the Carolina Panthers of the National Football League (NFL). He played college football for the Texas A&M Aggies. He was selected by the Los Angeles Rams in the fourth round of the 2021 NFL draft.

== College career ==
He played college football at Texas A&M from 2018 to 2020. He ranked seventh in the Southeastern Conference with 5.5 sacks in the 2020 season.

== Professional career ==
Pre-draft measurables
Height	Weight	Arm length	Hand span	Wingspan	40-yard dash	10-yard split	20-yard split	20-yard shuttle	Three-cone drill	Vertical jump	Broad jump
6 ft 4 in (1.93 m)	321 lb (146 kg)	34 3/4 in (0.88 m)	10 1/2 in (0.27 m)	7 ft 1 1/2 in (2.17 m)	5.00 s	1.68 s	2.90 s	4.58 s	7.62 s	33.0 in (0.84 m)	9 ft 5 in (2.87 m)
All values from Pro Day

=== Los Angeles Rams ===
Brown was selected by the Los Angeles Rams in the fourth round, 117th overall, of the 2021 NFL draft. He signed his four-year rookie contract with the Rams on June 3, 2021. Brown ended his rookie season with a Rams Super Bowl LVI victory against the Cincinnati Bengals.

Brown was suspended the first six games of the 2022 season for violating the NFL’s policy on performance-enhancing substances. In the 2022 season, he appeared in nine games and started one. He finished with eight total tackles.

On October 10, 2023, Brown was placed on injured reserve. He was activated on November 18. In the 2023 season, he appeared in and started 13 games. He had a half-sack and 31 tackles. In the 2024 season, he appeared in all 17 games and started 16. He finished with 44 tackles and one pass defended.

=== Carolina Panthers ===
On March 14, 2025, Brown signed a three-year, $21 million contract with the Carolina Panthers.

== NFL career statistics ==
Legend
	Won the Super Bowl
**Bold**	Career high

=== Regular season ===
Year	Team	Games		Tackles					Interceptions						Fumbles				
Year	Team	GP	GS	Cmb	Solo	Ast	Sck	TFL	Int	Yds	Avg	Lng	TD	PD	FF	Fmb	FR	Yds	TD
2021	LAR	10	0	1	0	1	0.0	0	0	0	0.0	0	0	0	0	0	0	0	0
2022	LAR	9	1	8	5	3	0.0	1	0	0	0.0	0	0	0	0	0	0	0	0
2023	LAR	13	13	31	**16**	15	**0.5**	**4**	0	0	0.0	0	0	0	0	0	0	0	0
2024	LAR	17	16	**44**	**16**	**28**	0.0	**4**	0	0	0.0	0	0	**1**	0	0	0	0	0
2025	CAR	17	5	31	13	18	**0.5**	3	0	0	0.0	0	0	**1**	0	0	0	0	0
2026	CAR	3	1	3	0	3	0.0	0	0	0	0.0	0	0	**1**	0	0	0	0	0
Career		69	36	118	50	68	1.0	12	0	0	0.0	0	0	3	0	0	0	0	0

=== Postseason ===
Year	Team	Games		Tackles					Interceptions						Fumbles				
Year	Team	GP	GS	Cmb	Solo	Ast	Sck	TFL	Int	Yds	Avg	Lng	TD	PD	FF	Fmb	FR	Yds	TD
2021	LAR	3	0	0	0	0	0.0	0	0	0	0.0	0	0	0	0	0	0	0	0
2023	LAR	1	1	4	2	2	0.0	0	0	0	0.0	0	0	0	0	0	0	0	0
2024	LAR	2	2	**5**	2	**3**	0.0	0	0	0	0.0	0	0	0	0	0	0	0	0
2025	CAR	1	0	3	**3**	0	0.0	0	0	0	0.0	0	0	0	0	0	0	0	0
Career		7	3	12	7	5	0.0	0	0	0	0.0	0	0	0	0	0	0	0	0
