= 2021 Los Angeles Rams season =

American football team season

- Owner: Stan Kroenke
- General manager: Les Snead
- Head coach: Sean McVay
- Offensive coordinator: Kevin O'Connell
- Defensive coordinator: Raheem Morris
- Home stadium: SoFi Stadium

Results
- Record: 12–5
- Division place: 1st NFC West
- Playoffs: Won Wild Card Playoffs (vs. Cardinals) 34–11; Won Divisional Playoffs (at Buccaneers) 30–27; Won NFC Championship (vs. 49ers) 20–17; Won Super Bowl LVI (vs. (Note: Despite being played in the Rams home stadium, the Super Bowl is still officially considered a neutral site game. The Rams were the designated away team based on annual conference rotation.) Bengals) 23–20
- All-Pros: 3: WR Cooper Kupp (1st team); DT Aaron Donald (1st team); CB Jalen Ramsey (1st team)
- Pro Bowlers: 4: Selected but did not play due to participation in Super Bowl LVI: WR Cooper Kupp; DT Aaron Donald; CB Jalen Ramsey; K Matt Gay

Uniform
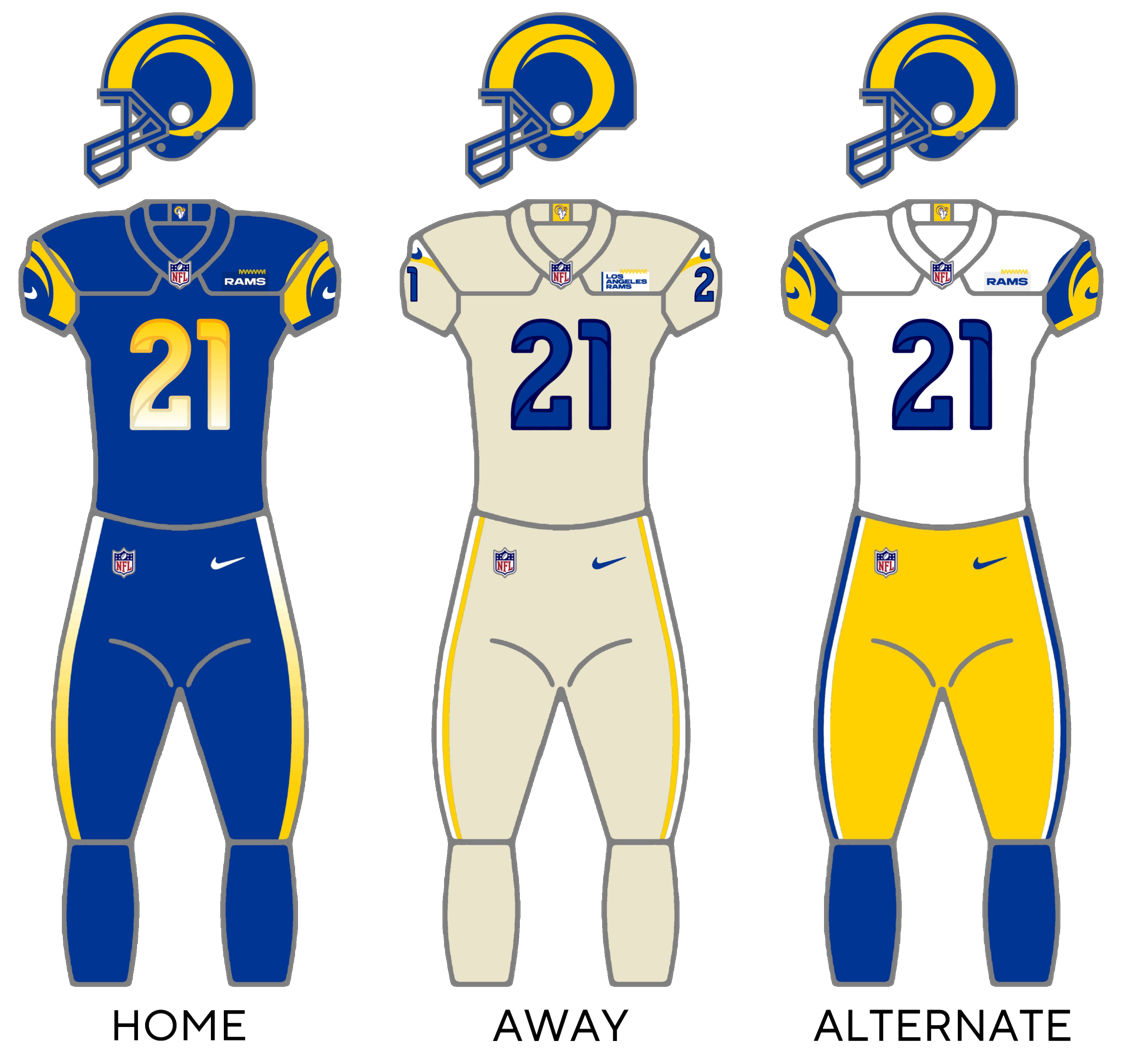

The 2021 season was the Los Angeles Rams' 84th season in the National Football League (NFL), their 85th overall, their 55th in the Greater Los Angeles Area, the second playing their home games at SoFi Stadium and their fifth under head coach Sean McVay.

The Rams improved upon their 10–6 record from the previous season after a win over the Minnesota Vikings in Week 16, and clinched their second consecutive playoff berth the same week. Despite a Week 18 overtime loss to the San Francisco 49ers, the Rams won their division for the first time since 2018. They advanced to the NFC Championship after defeating the Arizona Cardinals in the Wild Card round and the defending Super Bowl champion Tampa Bay Buccaneers 30–27 in the divisional round, where they faced their divisional rival San Francisco 49ers, winning the game 20–17 and advancing to Super Bowl LVI to be played at SoFi Stadium, becoming only the second team ever to participate in the Super Bowl in their home stadium. The Rams won their second Super Bowl overall, defeating the Cincinnati Bengals 23–20 to win their first Super Bowl since 1999, and also won the franchise's first title (including pre-merger) as a Los Angeles-based team since 1951, in addition to the first Super Bowl title won by a California-based team since the 1994 49ers, and fourth overall. Coincidentally, in order to be the second team to win the Super Bowl in their home stadium the Rams had to get past the Buccaneers, who were the first. Unlike the Bucs, however, the Rams, despite playing in their home stadium, were the designated visiting team, as the league alternates between the two conferences annually. The team shares the stadium with the Chargers, who were designated as the Super Bowl host.

This was the Rams' first season since 2015 without quarterback Jared Goff on the roster, as he was traded to the Detroit Lions in exchange for Matthew Stafford.

== Offseason ==
=== Coaching changes ===
- The Los Angeles Chargers hired Rams defensive coordinator Brandon Staley as their new head coach January 17, 2021.
- Former Atlanta Falcons defensive coordinator and interim head coach Raheem Morris was hired by the Los Angeles Rams as defensive coordinator on January 21, 2021, replacing Brandon Staley.
- Pass game coordinator Shane Waldron was hired by the Seattle Seahawks as their offensive coordinator January 26, 2021 Additionally, the Seahawks hired away Andy Dickerson to be their run game coordinator. Dickerson was the last remaining member of the coaching staff who had been with the team in St. Louis.
- The Detroit Lions hired cornerbacks coach Aubrey Pleasant as pass game coordinator/defensive backs coach on January 28, 2021.
- The Green Bay Packers hired Rams assistant head coach Joe Barry as their defensive coordinator February 8, 2021
- Liam Coen departed the Rams to become offensive coordinator at the University of Kentucky
- Rams run game coordinator/offensive line coach Aaron Kromer was not retained.

=== Trades ===
| March 17 | To Los Angeles Rams: 2023 seventh round pick | To Detroit Lions: Michael Brockers |
| March 18 | To Los Angeles Rams: Matthew Stafford | To Detroit Lions: Jared Goff; 2021 third round pick; 2022 first round pick; 2023 first round pick |

=== Uniform changes ===
- In July 2021, the Rams unveiled a third alternate uniform for the 2021 season. Introduced as a "modern throwback," the white uniform evoked memories of the white jerseys worn by the team from 1973 through 1999, while also incorporating many of the design changes that had been introduced a year earlier. In contrast to the pointed criticism that welcomed the earlier redesign, reaction to the new white alternate jersey was positive. The white jerseys made their on-field debut in the team's season opener and were ultimately used by the Rams in Super Bowl LVI.

=== Roster changes ===
2021 Los Angeles Rams draft
| Round | Selection | Player | Position | College |
|---|---|---|---|---|
| 2 | 57 | Tutu Atwell | WR | Louisville |
| 3 | 103 | Ernest Jones | LB | South Carolina |
| 4 | 117 | Bobby Brown III | DT | Texas A&M |
| 4 | 130 | Robert Rochell | CB | Central Arkansas |
| 4 | 141 | Jacob Harris | WR | UCF |
| 5 | 174 | Earnest Brown IV | DE | Northwestern |
| 7 | 233 | Jake Funk | RB | Maryland |
| 7 | 249 | Ben Skowronek | WR | Notre Dame |
| 7 | 252 | Chris Garrett | LB | Concordia–St. Paul |

Pre-draft trades

- The Rams traded their first-round and fourth-round selections as well as their 2020 first-round selections to Jacksonville in exchange for cornerback Jalen Ramsey.
- The Rams traded their third-round selection as well as a 2022 and a 2023 first-round selection and quarterback Jared Goff to Detroit in exchange for quarterback Matthew Stafford.

Draft day trades

- The Rams traded their fourth-round selection (#121 overall) and sixth-round selection (#209 overall) for the Jaguars' fourth, fifth, and seventh-round selections (#130, #170, and #249 overall).

In-season trades/acquisitions/releases

- On October 25, 2021, linebacker Kenny Young was traded to the Denver Broncos for a 2024 sixth-round pick.
- On November 1, 2021, linebacker Von Miller was acquired by the Rams in a trade with the Denver Broncos in exchange for second- and third-round picks in the 2022 NFL draft.
- On November 2, 2021, wide receiver DeSean Jackson was released by the Rams upon request.
- On November 11, 2021, wide receiver Odell Beckham Jr. signed a one-year deal as a free agent after being released by the Cleveland Browns.
- On January 12, 2022, after the regular season ended but prior to the postseason starting, free safety Eric Weddle came out of retirement to sign with the Rams.

== Staff ==
2021 Los Angeles Rams staff
| Front office: Chairman/CEO – Stan Kroenke; COO/Executive vice president of football operations – Kevin Demoff; General manager – Les Snead; Senior personnel executive – Brian Xanders; Senior personnel advisor – Taylor Morton; Director of scouting – James Gladstone; Assistant director of college scouting – Ted Monago; Director of draft management – J. W. Jordan; Director of football affairs – Jacques McClendon; Head coaches: Head coach – Sean McVay; Assistant head coach/running backs – Thomas Brown; Offensive coaches: Offensive coordinator – Kevin O'Connell; Assistant quarterbacks – Zac Robinson; Wide receivers – Eric Yarber; Pass game coordinator/tight ends – Wes Phillips; Offensive line – Kevin Carberry; Offensive assistant – Nick Jones; Offensive assistant – Zak Kromer; Offensive assistant – Chris O'Hara | Defensive coaches: Defensive coordinator – Raheem Morris; Run game coordinator/defensive line – Eric Henderson; Assistant defensive line – Marcus Dixon; Linebackers – Chris Shula; Assistant linebackers – Thad Bogardus; Pass game coordinator/secondary – Ejiro Evero; Assistant secondary – Jonathan Cooley; Special teams coaches: Special teams coordinator – Joe DeCamillis; Assistant special teams – Dwayne Stukes; Senior coaching assistant – John Bonamego; Strength and conditioning: Head strength and conditioning – Justin Lovett; Assistant strength and conditioning – Fernando Noriega; Assistant strength and conditioning – Dustin Woods |

== Final roster ==
2021 Los Angeles Rams roster
| Quarterbacks (QB): 16 Bryce Perkins; 9 Matthew Stafford; 13 John Wolford; Running backs (RB): 23 Cam Akers; 34 Jake Funk; 27 Darrell Henderson; 38 Buddy Howell; 25 Sony Michel; Wide receivers (WR): 3 Odell Beckham Jr.; 12 Van Jefferson; 10 Cooper Kupp; 19 Brandon Powell (American football); 18 Ben Skowronek; Tight ends (TE): 86 Kendall Blanton; 88 Brycen Hopkins | Offensive linemen (OL): 55 Brian Allen C; 72 Tremayne Anchrum G; 63 Austin Corbett G; 73 David Edwards G; 71 Bobby Evans T; 79 Rob Havenstein T; 68 Alaric Jackson T; 65 Coleman Shelton C; 77 Andrew Whitworth T; Defensive linemen (DL): 95 Bobby Brown III NT; 93 Marquise Copeland DT; 99 Aaron Donald DT; 91 Greg Gaines NT; 96 Michael Hoecht DT; 69 Sebastian Joseph-Day NT; 94 A'Shawn Robinson DE | Linebackers (LB): 54 Leonard Floyd OLB; 48 Chris Garrett OLB; 58 Justin Hollins OLB; 32 Travin Howard ILB; 50 Ernest Jones ILB; 52 Terrell Lewis OLB; 40 Von Miller OLB; 45 Ogbonnia Okoronkwo OLB; 51 Troy Reeder ILB; 56 Christian Rozeboom ILB; Defensive backs (DB): 26 Terrell Burgess FS; 21 Donte Deayon CB; 43 Jake Gervase FS; 46 Grant Haley CB; 22 David Long CB; 5 Jalen Ramsey CB; 24 Taylor Rapp FS; 33 Nick Scott SS; 11 Darious Williams CB; Special teams (ST): 8 Matt Gay K; 6 Johnny Hekker P; 42 Matthew Orzech LS | Practice squad: 84 Landen Akers WR; 67 Chandler Brewer T; 39 Antoine Brooks SS; 90 Earnest Brown IV DE; 36 Blake Countess CB; 37 Tyler Hall CB; 14 Javian Hawkins RB; 57 Anthony Hines III ILB (PS/I); 83 Warren Jackson WR (PS/I); 60 Jeremiah Kolone G; 17 J. J. Koski WR; 53 Justin Lawler OLB; 47 Kyle Markway TE; 41 Sharrod Neasman FS (PS/I); 35 Kareem Orr CB; 66 Max Pircher G (IPP); 1 Ryan Santoso K; 97 Carson Tinker LS; 20 Eric Weddle FS; 92 Jonah Williams DE; Reserve: 15 Tutu Atwell WR (IR); 30 Raymond Calais RB (IR); 64 Jamil Demby G (IR); 76 Adrian Ealy T (Futures); 4 Jordan Fuller SS (IR); 87 Jacob Harris WR (IR); 89 Tyler Higbee TE (IR); 61 Drake Jackson C (Futures); 25 Xavier Jones RB (IR); 82 Johnny Mundt TE (IR); 70 Joseph Noteboom T (IR); 31 Robert Rochell CB (IR); 2 Robert Woods WR (IR); Rookies in italics 53 active, 13 reserve, 16 practice squad (4 exempt) |

== Preseason ==
The Rams' preseason schedule was announced on May 12.

| Week | Date | Opponent | Result | Record | Venue | Recap |
|---|---|---|---|---|---|---|
| 1 | August 14 | Los Angeles Chargers | L 6–13 | 0–1 | SoFi Stadium | Recap |
| 2 | August 21 | Las Vegas Raiders | L 16–17 | 0–2 | SoFi Stadium | Recap |
| 3 | August 28 | at Denver Broncos | L 12–17 | 0–3 | Empower Field at Mile High | Recap |

== Regular season ==
=== Schedule ===
The Rams' 2021 schedule was announced on May 12.

| Week | Date | Opponent | Result | Record | Venue | Recap |
|---|---|---|---|---|---|---|
| 1 | September 12 | Chicago Bears | **W** 34–14 | 1–0 | SoFi Stadium | Recap |
| 2 | September 19 | at Indianapolis Colts | **W** 27–24 | 2–0 | Lucas Oil Stadium | Recap |
| 3 | September 26 | Tampa Bay Buccaneers | **W** 34–24 | 3–0 | SoFi Stadium | Recap |
| 4 | October 3 | **Arizona Cardinals** | **L** 20–37 | 3–1 | SoFi Stadium | Recap |
| 5 | October 7 | at **Seattle Seahawks** | **W** 26–17 | 4–1 | Lumen Field | Recap |
| 6 | October 17 | at New York Giants | **W** 38–11 | 5–1 | MetLife Stadium | Recap |
| 7 | October 24 | Detroit Lions | **W** 28–19 | 6–1 | SoFi Stadium | Recap |
| 8 | October 31 | at Houston Texans | **W** 38–22 | 7–1 | NRG Stadium | Recap |
| 9 | November 7 | Tennessee Titans | **L** 16–28 | 7–2 | SoFi Stadium | Recap |
| 10 | November 15 | at **San Francisco 49ers** | **L** 10–31 | 7–3 | Levi's Stadium | Recap |
| 11 | Bye | | | | | |
| 12 | November 28 | at Green Bay Packers | **L** 28–36 | 7–4 | Lambeau Field | Recap |
| 13 | December 5 | Jacksonville Jaguars | **W** 37–7 | 8–4 | SoFi Stadium | Recap |
| 14 | December 13 | at **Arizona Cardinals** | **W** 30–23 | 9–4 | State Farm Stadium | Recap |
| 15 | December 21 | **Seattle Seahawks** | **W** 20–10 | 10–4 | SoFi Stadium | Recap |
| 16 | December 26 | at Minnesota Vikings | **W** 30–23 | 11–4 | U.S. Bank Stadium | Recap |
| 17 | January 2 | at Baltimore Ravens | **W** 20–19 | 12–4 | M&T Bank Stadium | Recap |
| 18 | January 9 | **San Francisco 49ers** | **L** 24–27 (OT) | 12–5 | SoFi Stadium | Recap |

Note: Intra-division opponents are in bold text.

=== Game summaries ===
==== Week 1: vs. Chicago Bears ====
Week 1: Chicago Bears at Los Angeles Rams – Game summary

| Quarter | 1 | 2 | 3 | 4 | Total |
|---|---|---|---|---|---|
| Bears | 0 | 7 | 7 | 0 | **14** |
| **Rams** | 10 | 3 | 14 | 7 | **34** |

at SoFi Stadium, Inglewood, California

- Date: September 12
- Game time: 5:20 p.m. PDT
- Game weather: Sunny, 71 °F (22 °C)
- Game attendance: 70,445
- Referee: Brad Allen
- TV announcers (NBC): Al Michaels, Cris Collinsworth, Michele Tafoya and Terry McAulay
- Recap, Game Book

Game information

**First quarter**

- LAR – Van Jefferson 67-yard pass from Matthew Stafford (Matt Gay kick), 6:30. Rams 7–0. **Drive: 3 plays, 80 yards, 1:18.**
- LAR – Matt Gay 53-yard field goal, 4:39. Rams 10–0. **Drive: 6 plays, 24 yards, 2:38.**

**Second quarter**

- LAR – Matt Gay 22-yard field goal, 11:39. Rams 13–0. **Drive: 10 plays, 54 yards, 4:35.**
- CHI – David Montgomery 3-yard run (Cairo Santos kick), 0:34. Rams 13–7. **Drive: 9 plays, 55 yards, 4:08.**

**Third quarter**

- LAR – Cooper Kupp 56-yard pass from Matthew Stafford (Matt Gay kick), 13:52. Rams 20–7. **Drive: 4 plays, 75 yards, 1:08.**
- CHI – Justin Fields 3-yard run (Cairo Santos kick), 4:14. Rams 20–14. **Drive: 16 plays, 81 yards, 9:38.**
- LAR – Darrell Henderson 1-yard run (Matt Gay kick), 1:19. Rams 27–14. **Drive: 8 plays, 75 yards, 2:55.**

**Fourth quarter**

- LAR – Robert Woods 2-yard pass from Matthew Stafford (Matt Gay kick), 3:17. Rams 34–14. **Drive: 12 plays, 70 yards, 6:44.**

**Top passers**

- CHI – Andy Dalton – 27/38, 206 yards, INT
- LAR – Matthew Stafford – 20/26, 321 yards, 3 TD

**Top rushers**

- CHI – David Montgomery – 16 rushes, 108 yards, TD
- LAR – Darrell Henderson – 16 rushes, 70 yards, TD

**Top receivers**

- CHI – Marquise Goodwin – 4 receptions, 45 yards
- LAR – Cooper Kupp – 7 receptions, 108 yards, TD

Playing their first regular season game in front of fans at SoFi Stadium, the Rams overwhelmed the visiting Bears on Sunday Night Football. Quarterback Matthew Stafford was named NFC Offensive Player of the Week in his debut as Rams quarterback following an offseason trade with the Detroit Lions, completing 20 of 26 passes for 321 yards and three touchdowns. Following an interception by Rams cornerback David Long Jr. on the game's opening drive, Stafford's first scoring toss came on L.A.'s third offensive play, as he found wide receiver Van Jefferson on a deep pass down the middle. Jefferson tumbled as he caught the pass, then got up and ran into the end zone to complete the scoring play. Kicker Matt Gay added two field goals (53, 22) to give Los Angeles a 13–7 halftime lead. The Rams pulled away with a dominant second half. Stafford's second touchdown pass went deep to a wide open Cooper Kupp who found himself behind the Bears secondary for a 56-yard scoring play. Running back Darrell Henderson led the Rams on the ground with 70 rushing yards on 16 carries, including a 1-yard touchdown run to cap an 8-play, 75-yard drive late in the third period. Kupp finished with seven receptions for 108 yards, while fellow wide receiver Robert Woods caught a 2-yard pass from Stafford to seal the Rams' victory. On defense, safety Jordan Fuller led Los Angeles with 11 tackles, while linebacker Kenny Young added 10 tackles and a fumble recovery, and fellow linebacker Justin Hollins had two sacks and a forced fumble. The game featured the introduction of a new white alternate throwback jersey for the Rams that resembled the team's uniform design from 1973 to 1999.

==== Week 2: at Indianapolis Colts ====
Week 2: Los Angeles Rams at Indianapolis Colts – Game summary

| Quarter | 1 | 2 | 3 | 4 | Total |
|---|---|---|---|---|---|
| **Rams** | 7 | 3 | 7 | 10 | **27** |
| Colts | 0 | 6 | 8 | 10 | **24** |

at Lucas Oil Stadium, Indianapolis, Indiana

- Date: September 19
- Game time: 1:00 p.m. EDT/10:00 a.m. PDT
- Game weather: None (retractable roof closed)
- Game attendance: 63,076
- Referee: Shawn Smith
- TV announcers (Fox): Kenny Albert, Jonathan Vilma and Lindsay Czarniak
- Recap, Game Book

Game information

**First quarter**

- LAR – Cooper Kupp 16-yard pass from Matthew Stafford (Matt Gay kick), 3:18. Rams 7–0. **Drive: 8 plays, 90 yards, 4:55.**

**Second quarter**

- IND – Rodrigo Blankenship 48-yard field goal, 14:52. Rams 7–3. **Drive: 7 plays, 45 yards, 3:56.**
- LAR – Matt Gay 34-yard field goal, 1:51. Rams 10–3. **Drive: 16 plays, 79 yards, 8:18.**
- IND – Rodrigo Blankenship 46-yard field goal, 0:00. Rams 10–6. **Drive: 10 plays, 47 yards, 1:51.**

**Third quarter**

- LAR – Darrell Henderson 2-yard run (Matt Gay kick), 11:36. Rams 17–6. **Drive: 7 plays, 74 yards, 3:24.**
- IND – Zach Pascal 8-yard pass from Carson Wentz (Carson Wentz–Jack Doyle pass), 3:43. Rams 17–14. **Drive: 11 plays, 74 yards, 5:38.**

**Fourth quarter**

- IND – Ashton Dulin fumble recovery in end zone (Rodrigo Blankenship kick), 14:12. Colts 21–17.
- LAR – Cooper Kupp 10-yard pass from Matthew Stafford (Matt Gay kick), 12:09. Rams 24–21. **Drive: 4 plays, 70 yards, 2:03.**
- IND – Rodrigo Blankenship 35-yard field goal, 7:22. Tied 24–24. **Drive: 9 plays, 58 yards, 4:47.**
- LAR – Matt Gay 38-yard field goal, 2:23. Rams 27–24. **Drive: 12 plays, 55 yards, 4:59.**

**Top passers**

- LAR – Matthew Stafford – 19/30, 278 yards, 2 TD, INT
- IND – Carson Wentz – 20/31, 247 yards, TD, INT

**Top rushers**

- LAR – Darrell Henderson – 13 rushes, 53 yards, TD
- IND – Jonathan Taylor – 15 rushes, 51 yards

**Top receivers**

- LAR – Cooper Kupp – 9 receptions, 163 yards, 2 TD
- IND – Michael Pittman Jr. – 8 receptions, 123 yards

After building a double-digit lead on the road, the Rams had to rally back to defeat the Colts. Cooper Kupp scored on a 16-yard pass from Matthew Stafford and Matt Gay converted a 34-yard field goal to put Los Angeles ahead 10–6 at halftime, and running back Darrell Henderson's 2-yard TD run early in the third quarter gave the Rams a 17–6 advantage. But Indianapolis vaulted back in the lead 21–17 at the beginning of the fourth quarter when a bad punt snap resulted in a fumble recovery by Ashton Dulin in the end zone for a touchdown. Kupp, who caught nine passes for 163 yards, scored his second touchdown of the game on a 10-yard strike from Stafford and after the Colts tied the score on a Rodrigo Blankenship field goal, Gay's 38-yard field goal with 2:23 left put the Rams up 27–24. Cornerback Jalen Ramsey sealed the L.A. victory with an interception on the Colts' following drive. Defensive tackle Sebastian Joseph-Day led Los Angeles with nine tackles including a sack.

==== Week 3: vs. Tampa Bay Buccaneers ====
Week 3: Tampa Bay Buccaneers at Los Angeles Rams – Game summary

| Quarter | 1 | 2 | 3 | 4 | Total |
|---|---|---|---|---|---|
| Buccaneers | 0 | 7 | 10 | 7 | **24** |
| **Rams** | 0 | 14 | 17 | 3 | **34** |

at SoFi Stadium, Inglewood, California

- Date: September 26
- Game time: 1:25 p.m. PDT
- Game weather: Cloudy, 68 °F (20 °C)
- Game attendance: 73,205
- Referee: Craig Wrolstad
- TV announcers (Fox): Joe Buck, Troy Aikman, Erin Andrews and Tom Rinaldi
- Recap, Game Book

Game information

**First quarter**

- **No scoring plays.**

**Second quarter**

- LA – Tyler Higbee 6-yard pass from Matthew Stafford (Matt Gay kick), 12:22. Rams 7–0. **Drive: 14 plays, 95 yards, 8:05.**
- TB – Chris Godwin 2-yard rush (Ryan Succop kick), 4:03 Tied 7–7. **Drive: 15 plays, 76 yards, 8:19.**
- LA – Cooper Kupp 2-yard pass from Matthew Stafford (Matt Gay kick), 0:51. Rams 14–7. **Drive: 10 plays, 69 yards, 3:12.**

**Third quarter**

- LA – DeSean Jackson 75-yard pass from Matthew Stafford (Matt Gay kick), 14:02. Rams 21–7. **Drive: 3 plays, 75 yards, 0:58.**
- TB – Tom Brady 1-yard rush (Ryan Succop kick), 9:57. Rams 21–14. **Drive: 9 plays, 75 yards, 4:05.**
- LA – Copper Kupp 10-yard pass from Matthew Stafford (Matt Gay kick), 7:23. Rams 28–14. **Drive: 7 plays, 75 yards, 2:34.**
- LA – Matt Gay 47-yard field goal, 3:09. Rams 31–14. **Drive: 4 plays, 7 yards, 1:15.**
- TB – Ryan Succop 26-yard field goal, 1:14. Rams 31–17. **Drive: 8 plays, 67 yards, 1:55.**

**Fourth quarter**

- LA – Matt Gay 26-yard field goal, 8:14 Rams 34–17. **Drive: 13 plays, 67 yards, 8:00.**
- TB – Giovani Bernard 7-yard pass from Tom Brady (Ryan Succop kick), 1:10. Rams 34–24. **Drive: 14 plays, 88 yards, 3:40.**

**Top passers**

- TB – Tom Brady – 41/55, 432 yards, TD
- LA – Matthew Stafford – 27/38, 343 yards, 4 TD

**Top rushers**

- TB – Tom Brady – 3 rushes, 14 yards, TD
- LA – Sony Michel – 20 rushes, 67 yards

**Top receivers**

- TB – Mike Evans – 6 receptions, 106 yards
- LA – DeSean Jackson – 3 receptions, 120 yards, TD

For the second time in three weeks, Matthew Stafford was named NFC Offensive Player of the Week after throwing for 343 yards and four touchdowns as the Rams started 3–0 for the fourth straight season with a victory over the defending Super Bowl champions. Following a scoreless first quarter, Los Angeles finished a 14-play, 95-yard drive when Stafford hit tight end Tyler Higbee with a 6-yard touchdown pass. Stafford struck again just before halftime with a 2-yard touchdown pass to wide receiver Cooper Kupp. Stafford, who completed 27 of 38 passes, threw two more touchdowns, one to DeSean Jackson for 75 yards and another to Kupp for 10 yards and a 31–14 lead. Kicker Matt Gay had two field goals in the second half. Linebacker Kenny Young had a team-high 10 tackles and a sack to lead the Rams defense.

==== Week 4: vs. Arizona Cardinals ====
Week 4: Arizona Cardinals at Los Angeles Rams – Game summary

| Quarter | 1 | 2 | 3 | 4 | Total |
|---|---|---|---|---|---|
| **Cardinals** | 7 | 17 | 10 | 3 | **37** |
| Rams | 10 | 3 | 0 | 7 | **20** |

at SoFi Stadium, Inglewood, California

- Date: October 3
- Game time: 1:05 p.m. PDT
- Game weather: Sunny, 89 °F (32 °C)
- Game attendance: 70,003
- Referee: Shawn Hochuli
- TV announcers (Fox): Chris Myers, Daryl Johnston and Jen Hale
- Recap, Game Book

Game information

**First quarter**

- LAR – Matt Gay 42-yard field goal, 11:18. Rams 3–0. **Drive: 9 plays, 52 yards, 3:42.**
- ARI – A. J. Green 41-yard pass from Kyler Murray (Matt Prater kick), 5:50. Cardinals 7–3. **Drive: 6 plays, 87 yards, 3:07.**
- LAR – Van Jefferson 14-yard pass from Matthew Stafford (Matt Gay kick), 0:52. Rams 10–7. **Drive: 9 plays, 75 yards, 4:58.**

**Second quarter**

- ARI – Maxx Williams 14-yard pass from Kyler Murray (Matt Prater kick), 10:44. Cardinals 14–10. **Drive: 11 plays, 75 yards, 5:08.**
- ARI – James Conner 1-yard run (Matt Prater kick), 8:44. Cardinals 21–10. **Drive: 5 plays, 21 yards, 1:51.**
- LAR – Matt Gay 22-yard field goal, 3:22. Cardinals 21–13. **Drive: 9 plays, 48 yards, 3:19.**
- ARI – Matt Prater 23-yard field goal, 0:04. Cardinals 24–13. **Drive: 17 plays, 70 yards, 3:18.**

**Third quarter**

- ARI – Matt Prater 55-yard field goal, 10:15. Cardinals 27–13. **Drive: 10 plays, 38 yards, 4:45.**
- ARI – James Conner 1-yard run (Matt Prater kick), 1:14. Cardinals 34–13. **Drive: 9 plays, 64 yards, 5:09.**

**Fourth quarter**

- ARI – Matt Prater 23-yard field goal, 3:38. Cardinals 37–13. **Drive: 12 plays, 94 yards, 8:27.**
- LAR – Robert Woods 14-yard pass from Matthew Stafford (Matt Gay kick), 1:14. Cardinals 37–20. **Drive: 9 plays, 75 yards, 2:24.**

**Top passers**

- ARI – Kyler Murray – 24/32, 268 yards, 2 TD
- LAR – Matthew Stafford – 26/41, 280 yards, 2 TD, INT

**Top rushers**

- ARI – Chase Edmonds – 12 rushes, 120 yards
- LAR – Darrell Henderson – 14 rushes, 89 yards

**Top receivers**

- ARI – A. J. Green – 5 receptions, 67 yards, TD
- LAR – Van Jefferson – 6 receptions, 90 yards, TD

Despite holding a 10–7 lead in the first quarter, the Rams were outscored 30–3 until the game's final minutes and fell to the Cardinals for the first time since 2016 in a battle of unbeaten teams for the NFC West lead. Matt Gay's 42-yard field goal ended L.A.'s opening drive, and wide receiver Van Jefferson caught a 14-yard touchdown pass from Matthew Stafford for the early advantage. But Cardinals quarterback Kyler Murray threw a TD pass to wide receiver Maxx Williams and running back James Conner ran for a pair of 1-yard touchdown runs in the second and third periods. Arizona got a pair of field goals from kicker Matt Prater to extend their lead to 37–13. The Rams got the final score on a 14-yard pass from Stafford to wide receiver Robert Woods. Safety Taylor Rapp had 12 tackles while Jalen Ramsey added five tackles and two pass deflections for the Rams defense.

==== Week 5: at Seattle Seahawks ====
Week 5: Los Angeles Rams at Seattle Seahawks – Game summary

| Quarter | 1 | 2 | 3 | 4 | Total |
|---|---|---|---|---|---|
| **Rams** | 0 | 3 | 13 | 10 | **26** |
| Seahawks | 0 | 7 | 0 | 10 | **17** |

at Lumen Field, Seattle, Washington

- Date: October 7
- Game time: 5:20 p.m. PDT
- Game weather: Sunny, 61 °F (16 °C)
- Game attendance: 68,747
- Referee: Ronald Torbert
- TV announcers (Fox/NFLN/Prime Video): Joe Buck, Troy Aikman, Erin Andrews and Kristina Pink
- Recap, Game Book

Game information

**First quarter**

- **No scoring plays.**

**Second quarter**

- SEA – DK Metcalf 19-yard pass from Russell Wilson (Jason Myers kick), 9:04. Seahawks 7–0. **Drive: 3 plays, 83 yards, 1:37.**
- LAR – Matt Gay 31-yard field goal, 1:08. Seahawks 7–3. **Drive: 14 plays, 63 yards, 7:56.**

**Third quarter**

- LAR – Darrell Henderson 5-yard run (kick failed), 7:56. Rams 9–7. **Drive: 8 plays, 96 yards, 3:07.**
- LAR – Tyler Higbee 13-yard pass from Matthew Stafford (Matt Gay kick), 4:46. Rams 16–7. **Drive: 5 plays, 82 yards, 2:05.**

**Fourth quarter**

- SEA – DK Metcalf 23-yard pass from Geno Smith (Jason Myers kick), 9:16. Rams 16–14. **Drive: 10 plays, 98 yards, 5:26.**
- LAR – Sony Michel 2-yard run (Matt Gay kick), 6:08. Rams 23–14. **Drive: 6 plays, 73 yards, 3:08.**
- SEA – Jason Myers 32-yard field goal, 2:45. Rams 23–17. **Drive: 11 plays, 46 yards, 3:23.**
- LAR – Matt Gay 47-yard field goal, 0:24. Rams 26–17. **Drive: 4 plays, 3 yards, 1:38.**

**Top passers**

- LAR – Matthew Stafford – 25/37, 365 yards, TD, INT
- SEA – Russell Wilson – 11/16, 152 yards, TD, INT

**Top rushers**

- LAR – Darrell Henderson – 17 rushes, 82 yards, TD
- SEA – Alex Collins – 15 rushes, 47 yards

**Top receivers**

- LAR – Robert Woods – 12 receptions, 150 yards
- SEA – DK Metcalf – 5 receptions, 98 yards, 2 TD

Trailing 7–3 at halftime, the Rams stormed back with a dominant second half performance to defeat the host Seahawks in a Thursday Night Football matchup. Following a scoreless first quarter, Seattle scored first on a touchdown pass from Russell Wilson to DK Metcalf. Kicker Matt Gay's 31-yard field goal just over a minute before the intermission got the Rams on the scoreboard. Wide receiver Robert Woods, who had six receptions in the first half, added six more to total season highs in receptions (12) and yardage (150), while quarterback Matthew Stafford connected with DeSean Jackson for a 68-yard catch-and-run that led to a 5-yard TD run by Darrell Henderson to take the lead 10–7. After forcing a three-and-out on the Seahawks, Stafford connected with Woods on back-to-back 20-yard pass plays, and a 29-yard run by Henderson set up Stafford's 13-yard scoring pass to tight end Tyler Higbee. Defensively, the Rams were led by eight tackles from Sebastian Joseph-Day and the defense combined for two sacks of Wilson, who suffered a broken finger late in the third quarter and was knocked out of the game. After backup Geno Smith led the Seahawks on a 98-yard drive capped by a touchdown pass to Metcalf, the Rams reasserted themselves as Stafford connected with Woods (24 yards) and Cooper Kupp (33 yards) to put L.A. inside the Seattle 20. Another pass from Stafford to Kupp (this time for 13 yards) gave the Rams first-and-goal at the Seahawks 2. From there, running back Sony Michel cashed in with a touchdown run. Cornerback Nick Scott intercepted a Smith pass just before the two-minute warning and Gay added a second field goal (47 yards) to close out the scoring.

==== Week 6: at New York Giants ====
Week 6: Los Angeles Rams at New York Giants – Game summary

| Quarter | 1 | 2 | 3 | 4 | Total |
|---|---|---|---|---|---|
| **Rams** | 0 | 28 | 3 | 7 | **38** |
| Giants | 3 | 0 | 0 | 8 | **11** |

at MetLife Stadium, East Rutherford, New Jersey

- Date: October 17
- Game time: 1:00 p.m. EDT/10:00 a.m. PDT
- Game weather: Partly cloudy, 61 °F (16 °C)
- Game attendance: 73,920
- Referee: Alex Kemp
- TV announcers (Fox): Adam Amin, Mark Schlereth and Shannon Spake
- Recap, Game Book

Game information

**First quarter**

- NYG – Graham Gano 27-yard field goal, 9:21. Giants 3–0. **Drive: 14 plays, 73 yards, 5:39.**

**Second quarter**

- LAR – Robert Woods 15-yard pass from Matthew Stafford (Matt Gay kick), 10:28. Rams 7–3. **Drive: 6 plays, 66 yards, 3:05.**
- LAR – Cooper Kupp 3-yard pass from Matthew Stafford (Matt Gay kick), 8:06. Rams 14–3. **Drive: 4 plays, 12 yards, 1:17.**
- LAR – Darrell Henderson 2-yard run (Matt Gay kick), 3:36. Rams 21–3. **Drive: 4 plays, 14 yards, 1:17.**
- LAR – Darrell Henderson 25-yard pass from Matthew Stafford (Matt Gay kick), 0:33. Rams 28–3. **Drive: 6 plays, 73 yards, 1:41.**

**Third quarter**

- LAR – Matt Gay 32-yard field goal, 5:45. Rams 31–3. **Drive: 13 plays, 68 yards, 9:15.**

**Fourth quarter**

- LAR – Cooper Kupp 13-yard pass from Matthew Stafford (Matt Gay kick), 11:55. Rams 38–3. **Drive: 9 plays, 49 yards, 5:03.**
- NYG – Elijhaa Penny 4-yard run (Daniel Jones-Kyle Rudolph pass), 6:21. Rams 38–11. **Drive: 12 plays, 53 yards, 3:27.**

**Top passers**

- LAR – Matthew Stafford – 22/28, 251 yards, 4 TD, INT
- NYG – Daniel Jones – 29/51, 242 yards, 3 INT

**Top rushers**

- LAR – Darrell Henderson – 21 rushes, 78 yards, TD
- NYG – Devontae Booker – 12 rushes, 41 yards

**Top receivers**

- LAR – Cooper Kupp – 9 receptions, 130 yards, 2 TD
- NYG – Sterling Shepard – 10 receptions, 76 yards

The Rams exploded for 28 points in the second quarter as Matthew Stafford threw three of his four touchdown passes to rout the host Giants. After giving up a field goal in the first quarter, Stafford hooked up with Robert Woods from 15 yards out to finish a six-play, 66-yard drive. On the following possession, Giants quarterback Daniel Jones was sacked by linebacker Ogbonnia Okoronkwo who stripped the ball and recovered it at the New York 12. Four plays later, Stafford and wide receiver Cooper Kupp connected from three yards out. Running back Darrell Henderson, who led the Rams with 78 rushing yards, scored touchdowns on a 2-yard run and on a 25-yard catch from Stafford 33 seconds before halftime. Kupp, who led the Rams with nine receptions for 130 yards, caught a second touchdown from Stafford (251 passing yards) from 13 yards early in the fourth quarter. On defense, safety Taylor Rapp had two interceptions (both of which set up Rams touchdowns), two pass deflections and recorded four tackles to earn NFC Defensive Player of the Week honors. Fellow safety Jordan Fuller led the team with 11 tackles.

==== Week 7: vs. Detroit Lions ====
Week 7: Detroit Lions at Los Angeles Rams – Game summary

| Quarter | 1 | 2 | 3 | 4 | Total |
|---|---|---|---|---|---|
| Lions | 10 | 6 | 3 | 0 | **19** |
| **Rams** | 3 | 14 | 0 | 11 | **28** |

at SoFi Stadium, Inglewood, California

- Date: October 24
- Game time: 1:05 p.m. PDT
- Game weather: Cloudy, 66 °F (19 °C)
- Game attendance: 70,540
- Referee: Bill Vinovich
- TV announcers (Fox): Kevin Kugler, Mark Sanchez and Laura Okmin
- Recap, Game Book

Game information

**First quarter**

- DET – D'Andre Swift 63-yard pass from Jared Goff (Austin Seibert kick), 12:07. Lions 7–0. **Drive: 6 plays, 75 yards, 2:53.**
- DET – Austin Seibert 37-yard field goal, 7:28. Lions 10–0. **Drive: 10 plays, 35 yards, 4:39.**
- LA – Matt Gay 33-yard field goal, 2:55. Lions 10–3. **Drive: 10 plays, 67 yards, 4:33.**

**Second quarter**

- DET – Austin Seibert 47-yard field goal, 13:40. Lions 13–3. **Drive: 8 plays, 46 yards, 4:15.**
- LA – Van Jefferson 11-yard pass from Matthew Stafford (Matt Gay kick), 8:36. Lions 13–10. **Drive: 11 plays, 84 yards, 5:04.**
- LA – Cooper Kupp 2-yard pass from Matthew Stafford (Matt Gay kick), 1:23. Rams 17–13. **Drive: 11 plays, 74 yards, 5:44.**
- DET – Austin Seibert 41-yard field goal, 0:04. Rams 17–16. **Drive: 8 plays, 52 yards, 1:19.**

**Third quarter**

- DET – Austin Seibert 31-yard field goal, 1:43. Lions 19–17. **Drive: 6 plays, 41 yards, 2:13.**

**Fourth quarter**

- LA – Cooper Kupp 5-yard pass from Matthew Stafford (Matthew Stafford–Robert Woods pass), 13:59. Rams 25–19. **Drive: 8 plays, 90 yards, 2:44.**
- LA – Matt Gay 47-yard field goal, 0:58. Rams 28–19. **Drive: 9 plays, 48 yards, 3:55.**

**Top passers**

- DET – Jared Goff – 22/36, 268 yards, TD, 2 INT
- LA – Matthew Stafford – 28/41, 334 yards, 3 TD

**Top rushers**

- DET – Jamaal Williams – 12 rushes, 57 yards
- LA – Darrell Henderson – 15 rushes, 45 yards

**Top receivers**

- DET – Kalif Raymond – 6 receptions, 115 yards
- LA – Cooper Kupp – 10 receptions, 156 yards, 2 TD

Returning home to SoFi Stadium, the Rams fought off a determined Detroit team to improve to 6–1. Facing his former team for the first time, quarterback Matthew Stafford completed 28 of 41 passes for 334 yards and three touchdowns to rally Los Angeles over the winless Lions, who took a 10–0 lead in the first quarter. Detroit held a 13–3 advantage midway through the second period when Stafford led back-to-back 11-play scoring droves, ending both with touchdown passes to wide receivers Van Jefferson (11 yards) and Cooper Kupp (2 yards). After the Lions had regained the lead with pair of field goals, Stafford completed the comeback with a 5-yard touchdown pass to Kupp early in the fourth quarter. Also taking his former team, quarterback Jared Goff completed 22 of 36 passes for 268 yards and led a 15-play, 67-yard drive down to the Rams 12 with under five minutes remaining. But Rams cornerback Jalen Ramsey spoiled the upset bid by intercepting Goff's pass in the end zone and returning it 25 yards. Ramsey's interception led to a 47-yard field goal by kicker Matt Gay to seal the game, and safety Nick Scott then intercepted a second pass from Goff that allowed the Rams to run out the clock.

==== Week 8: at Houston Texans ====
Week 8: Los Angeles Rams at Houston Texans – Game summary

| Quarter | 1 | 2 | 3 | 4 | Total |
|---|---|---|---|---|---|
| **Rams** | 7 | 17 | 14 | 0 | **38** |
| Texans | 0 | 0 | 0 | 22 | **22** |

at NRG Stadium, Houston, Texas

- Date: October 31
- Game time: 12:00 p.m. CDT/10:00 a.m. PDT
- Game weather: None (retractable roof closed)
- Game attendance: 66,013
- Referee: Clay Martin
- TV announcers (Fox): Chris Myers, Daryl Johnston and Jen Hale
- Recap, Game Book

Game information

**First quarter**

- LAR – Darrell Henderson 3-yard pass from Matthew Stafford (Matt Gay kick), 9:32. Rams 7–0. **Drive: 11 plays, 75 yards, 5:28.**

**Second quarter**

- LAR – Matt Gay 27-yard field goal, 8:51. Rams 10–0. **Drive: 10 plays, 56 yards, 4:32.**
- LAR – Robert Woods 2-yard pass from Matthew Stafford (Matt Gay kick), 6:09. Rams 17–0. **Drive: 4 plays, 12 yards, 1:55.**
- LAR – Darrell Henderson 1-yard run (Matt Gay kick), 0:30. Rams 24–0. **Drive: 7 plays, 79 yards, 3:19.**

**Third quarter**

- LAR – Cooper Kupp 11-yard pass from Matthew Stafford (Matt Gay kick), 7:55. Rams 31–0. **Drive: 3 plays, 79 yards, 1:31.**
- LAR – Robert Woods 16-yard run (Matt Gay kick), 0:02. Rams 38–0. **Drive: 9 plays, 77 yards, 5:52.**

**Fourth quarter**

- HOU – Rex Burkhead 1-yard run (Kaʻimi Fairbairn kick), 8:08. Rams 38–7. **Drive: 10 plays, 60 yards, 3:55.**
- HOU – Brandin Cooks 45-yard pass from Davis Mills (Kaʻimi Fairbairn kick), 5:00. Rams 38–14. **Drive: 4 plays, 62 yards, 1:23.**
- HOU – Brevin Jordan 9-yard pass from Davis Mills (Davis Mills run), 2:35. Rams 38–22. **Drive: 6 plays, 50 yards, 2:25.**

**Top passers**

- LAR – Matthew Stafford – 21/32, 305 yards, 3 TD
- HOU – Davis Mills – 29/38, 310 yards, 2 TD, INT

**Top rushers**

- LAR – Darrell Henderson – 14 rushes, 90 yards, TD
- HOU – Rex Burkhead – 4 rushes, 21 yards, TD

**Top receivers**

- LAR – Cooper Kupp – 7 receptions, 115 yards, TD
- HOU – Brandin Cooks – 6 receptions, 83 yards, TD

Rolling to their seventh win in eight weeks, the Rams scored 38 unanswered points through three quarters in defeating the host Texans for the fourth time in five all-time meetings. Running back Darrell Henderson got the Rams on the scoreboard first with a 3-yard touchdown reception from Matthew Stafford on the opening drive, while also scoring on a 1-yard run as part of a season-best 90 yards rushing. Stafford, who completed 21 of 32 passes for 305 yards, threw touchdown passes to wide receivers Cooper Kupp (11 yards) and Robert Woods (2 yards). Kupp again led the team with seven receptions for 115 yards, while Woods added a 16-yard touchdown run. Linebacker Ernest Jones led the Rams with nine tackles and defensive tackle Aaron Donald had four tackles, including 1.5 sacks in L.A.'s victory.

==== Week 9: vs. Tennessee Titans ====
Week 9: Tennessee Titans at Los Angeles Rams – Game summary

| Quarter | 1 | 2 | 3 | 4 | Total |
|---|---|---|---|---|---|
| **Titans** | 0 | 21 | 0 | 7 | **28** |
| Rams | 3 | 0 | 3 | 10 | **16** |

at SoFi Stadium, Inglewood, California

- Date: November 7
- Game time: 5:20 p.m. PST
- Game weather: Cloudy, 59 °F (15 °C)
- Game attendance: 71,785
- Referee: Brad Rogers
- TV announcers (NBC): Al Michaels, Cris Collinsworth, Michele Tafoya and Terry McAulay
- Recap, Game Book

Game information

**First quarter**

- LAR – Matt Gay 34-yard field goal, 3:46. Rams 3–0. **Drive: 10 plays, 49 yards, 4:47.**

**Second quarter**

- TEN – Geoff Swaim 2-yard pass from Ryan Tannehill (Randy Bullock kick), 12:21. Titans 7–3. **Drive: 1 play, 2 yards, 0:04.**
- TEN – Kevin Byard 24-yard interception return (Randy Bullock kick), 12:10. Titans 14–3.
- TEN – Ryan Tannehill 1-yard run (Randy Bullock kick), 2:10. Titans 21–3. **Drive: 14 plays, 64 yards, 7:39.**

**Third quarter**

- LAR – Matt Gay 22-yard field goal, 8:15. Titans 21–6. **Drive: 11 plays, 84 yards, 4:15.**

**Fourth quarter**

- LAR – Matt Gay 54-yard field goal, 14:55. Titans 21–9. **Drive: 11 plays, 35 yards, 5:39.**
- TEN – Adrian Peterson 1-yard run (Randy Bullock kick), 3:00. Titans 28–9. **Drive: 7 plays, 59 yards, 3:39.**
- LAR – Sony Michel 3-yard pass from Matthew Stafford (Matt Gay kick), 0:24. Titans 28–16. **Drive: 14 plays, 75 yards, 2:36.**

**Top passers**

- TEN – Ryan Tannehill – 19/27, 143 yards, TD, INT
- LAR – Matthew Stafford – 31/48, 294 yards, TD, 2 INT

**Top rushers**

- TEN – D'Onta Foreman – 5 rushes, 29 yards
- LAR – Darrell Henderson – 11 rushes, 55 yards

**Top receivers**

- TEN – A. J. Brown – 5 receptions, 42 yards
- LAR – Robert Woods – 7 receptions, 98 yards

Quarterback Matthew Stafford was intercepted twice as the Titans routed the Rams in front of a national TV audience on Sunday Night Football. Los Angeles took a first quarter lead on a 34-yard field goal by Matt Gay. Visiting Tennessee went ahead for good early in the second quarter on tight end Geoff Swaim's 2-yard touchdown reception from quarterback Ryan Tannehill. On the very next play from scrimmage, Stafford attempted to evade a pass rush in his own end zone, and his errant toss was intercepted by Titans free safety Kevin Byard, who returned it 24 yards for a touchdown. Tannehill later added a 1-yard touchdown run just before the two-minute warning to put Tennessee ahead 21–3 at halftime. Gay converted two field goals in each of the final two periods, but new Titans running back Adrian Peterson scored on a 1-yard run late in the fourth quarter to put the Titans up 28–9. Stafford ended his day with a 3-yard touchdown pass to running back Sony Michel as the Rams fell to 7–2. Cornerback Jalen Ramsey had an interception to go along with three tackles for the Rams defense.

==== Week 10: at San Francisco 49ers ====
Week 10: Los Angeles Rams at San Francisco 49ers – Game summary

| Quarter | 1 | 2 | 3 | 4 | Total |
|---|---|---|---|---|---|
| Rams | 0 | 7 | 0 | 3 | **10** |
| **49ers** | 14 | 7 | 3 | 7 | **31** |

at Levi's Stadium, Santa Clara, California

- Date: November 15
- Game time: 5:15 p.m. PST
- Game weather: Overcast, 62 °F (17 °C)
- Game attendance: 64,256
- Referee: Shawn Smith
- TV announcers (ESPN): Steve Levy, Brian Griese, Louis Riddick, Lisa Salters and John Parry
- Recap, Game Book

Game information

**First quarter**

- SF – George Kittle 8-yard pass from Jimmy Garoppolo (Robbie Gould kick), 1:54. 49ers 7–0. **Drive: 18 plays, 93 yards, 11:03.**
- SF – Jimmie Ward 27-yard interception return (Robbie Gould kick), 0:49. 49ers 14–0.

**Second quarter**

- LAR – Tyler Higbee 10-yard pass from Matthew Stafford (Matt Gay kick), 13:16. 49ers 14–7. **Drive: 7 plays, 75 yards, 2:33.**
- SF – Deebo Samuel 8-yard run (Robbie Gould kick), 5:24. 49ers 21–7. **Drive: 11 plays, 91 yards, 7:52.**

**Third quarter**

- SF – Robbie Gould 50-yard field goal, 4:38. 49ers 24–7. **Drive: 10 plays, 31 yards, 6:14.**

**Fourth quarter**

- SF – Deebo Samuel 40-yard pass from Jimmy Garoppolo (Robbie Gould kick), 11:07. 49ers 31–7. **Drive: 6 plays, 56 yards, 3:53.**
- LAR – Matt Gay 37-yard field goal, 3:48. 49ers 31–10. **Drive: 7 plays, 33 yards, 1:11.**

**Top passers**

- LAR – Matthew Stafford – 26/41, 243 yards, TD, 2 INT
- SF – Jimmy Garoppolo – 15/19, 182 yards, 2 TD

**Top rushers**

- LAR – Darrell Henderson Jr. – 5 rushes, 31 yards
- SF – Elijah Mitchell – 27 rushes, 91 yards

**Top receivers**

- LAR – Cooper Kupp – 11 receptions, 122 yards
- SF – Deebo Samuel – 5 receptions, 97 yards, TD

A week after a dismal loss to Tennessee on Sunday Night Football, the Rams found themselves dominated by the host 49ers on Monday Night Football for their worst loss of the season. San Francisco, which had lost five of their last six games, was sparked by the play of free safety Jimmie Ward, who intercepted a deep pass by Rams quarterback Matthew Stafford at the San Francisco 7. The 49ers then marched 93 yards in 18 plays, capping the drive with an 8-yard touchdown pass from quarterback Jimmy Garoppolo to tight end George Kittle. On the Rams' next possession, a Stafford pass intended for Tyler Higbee bounced off the Rams tight end and into the arms of Ward, who returned his second interception 27 yards for a touchdown. The Rams answered on their next possession as Stafford and Higbee connected for a 10-yard TD pass to finished a 7-play, 75-yard drive. But the 49ers again moved methodically against the Rams defense, going 91 yards in 11 plays before wide receiver Deebo Samuel ran in from 8 yards out to give San Francisco a 21–7 lead. The 49ers added a field goal by kicker Robbie Gould while Garoppolo and Samuel connected on a 40-yard scoring play to give San Francisco a 31–7 lead. Kicker Matt Gay's 50-yard field goal in the fourth quarter finished the scoring for the Rams, who fell to the rival 49ers for the fifth straight time. Wide receiver Cooper Kupp had 11 receptions for 122 yards, while fellow wideout Odell Beckham Jr. had two receptions for 18 yards in his debut with the club after signing midseason as a free agent three days earlier.

==== Week 12: at Green Bay Packers ====
Week 12: Los Angeles Rams at Green Bay Packers – Game summary

| Quarter | 1 | 2 | 3 | 4 | Total |
|---|---|---|---|---|---|
| Rams | 0 | 17 | 0 | 11 | **28** |
| **Packers** | 7 | 13 | 16 | 0 | **36** |

at Lambeau Field, Green Bay, Wisconsin

- Date: November 28
- Game time: 3:25 p.m. CST/1:25 p.m. PST
- Game weather: Cloudy, 37 °F (3 °C)
- Game attendance: 77,948
- Referee: Craig Wrolstad
- TV announcers (Fox): Joe Buck, Troy Aikman, Erin Andrews and Tom Rinaldi
- Recap, Game Book

Game information

**First quarter**

- GB – Aaron Rodgers 1-yard run (Mason Crosby kick), 2:11. Packers 7–0. **Drive: 3 plays, 6 yards, 1:31.**

**Second quarter**

- GB – Mason Crosby 45-yard field goal, 13:29. Packers 10–0. **Drive: 4 plays, 3 yards, 1:53.**
- LAR – Van Jefferson 79-yard pass from Matthew Stafford (Matt Gay kick), 12:42. Packers 10–7. **Drive: 3 plays, 81 yards, 0:47.**
- GB – Mason Crosby 28-yard field goal, 9:40. Packers 13–7. **Drive: 7 plays, 66 yards, 3:02.**
- LAR – Matt Gay 36-yard field goal, 7:20. Packers 13–10. **Drive: 4 plays, 7 yards, 0:53.**
- GB – Randall Cobb 7-yard pass from Aaron Rodgers (Mason Crosby kick), 4:21. Packers 20–10. **Drive: 6 plays, 89 yards, 2:59.**
- LAR – Darrell Henderson 6-yard pass from Matthew Stafford (Matt Gay kick), 1:28. Packers 20–17. **Drive: 8 plays, 75 yards, 2:53.**

**Third quarter**

- GB – A. J. Dillon 5-yard pass from Aaron Rodgers (Mason Crosby kick), 7:18. Packers 27–17. **Drive: 13 plays, 75 yards, 7:42.**
- GB – Mason Crosby 29-yard field goal, 2:28. Packers 30–17. **Drive: 6 plays, 16 yards, 2:19.**
- GB – Rasul Douglas 33-yard interception return (pass failed), 1:52. Packers 36–17.

**Fourth quarter**

- LAR – Odell Beckham Jr. 54-yard pass from Matthew Stafford (Matthew Stafford-Cooper Kupp pass), 14:52. Packers 36–25. **Drive: 7 plays, 80 yards, 2:00.**
- LAR – Matt Gay 39-yard field goal, 0:18. Packers 36–28. **Drive: 11 plays, 47 yards, 2:47.**

**Top passers**

- LAR – Matthew Stafford – 21/38, 302 yards, 3 TD, INT
- GB – Aaron Rodgers – 28/45, 307 yards, 2 TD

**Top rushers**

- LAR – Darrell Henderson – 16 rushes, 55 yards
- GB – A. J. Dillon – 20 rushes, 69 yards

**Top receivers**

- LAR – Cooper Kupp – 7 receptions, 96 yards
- GB – Davante Adams – 8 receptions, 104 yards

The Rams stayed close until late in the third quarter before host Green Bay pulled away to drop Los Angeles to its third straight loss. The Packers took a 10–0 lead off a touchdown run by quarterback Aaron Rodgers and a Mason Crosby field goal, but L.A. struck back with quarterback Matthew Stafford connecting with wide receiver Van Jefferson for a 79-yard touchdown pass early in the second period. Crosby hit another field goal which was then matched by Rams kicker Matt Gay and Stafford threw a 6-yard TD pass to running back Darrell Henderson with 1:28 remaining in the first half to close within 20–17. But Green Bay put the game out of reach as Rodgers threw a touchdown pass to running back A.J. Dillon, Crosby added a third field goal, and cornerback Rasul Douglas picked off a Stafford pass and returned in 33 yards for a touchdown, and the Packers led 36–17. Stafford, who threw for 302 yards on 21-for-38 passing, tossed a 54-yard touchdown pass to wide receiver Odell Beckham Jr. and Gay added a 39-yard field goal in the final seconds to close out the Rams' scoring. Linebacker Troy Reeder had 13 total tackles to lead the Rams defense.

==== Week 13: vs. Jacksonville Jaguars ====
Week 13: Jacksonville Jaguars at Los Angeles Rams – Game summary

| Quarter | 1 | 2 | 3 | 4 | Total |
|---|---|---|---|---|---|
| Jaguars | 0 | 7 | 0 | 0 | **7** |
| **Rams** | 10 | 6 | 14 | 7 | **37** |

at SoFi Stadium, Inglewood, California

- Date: December 5
- Game time: 1:05 p.m. PST
- Game weather: Sunny, 65 °F (18 °C)
- Game attendance: 70,801
- Referee: Clete Blakeman
- TV announcers (Fox): Kevin Kugler, Mark Sanchez and Laura Okmin
- Recap, Game Book

Game information

**First quarter**

- LAR – Matt Gay 40-yard field goal, 12:20. Rams 3–0. **Drive: 6 plays, 12 yards, 2:40.**
- LAR – Sony Michel 5-yard run (Matt Gay kick), 10:25. Rams 10–0. **Drive: 3 plays, 27 yards, 1:21.**

**Second quarter**

- JAX – Carlos Hyde 1-yard run (Matthew Wright kick), 13:23. Rams 10–7. **Drive: 13 plays, 73 yards, 6:32.**
- LAR – Matt Gay 44-yard field goal, 7:41. Rams 13–7. **Drive: 10 plays, 57 yards, 5:42.**
- LAR – Matt Gay 37-yard field goal, 0:19. Rams 16–7. **Drive: 10 plays, 70 yards, 1:56.**

**Third quarter**

- LAR – Cooper Kupp 29-yard pass from Matthew Stafford (Matt Gay kick), 11:43. Rams 23–7. **Drive: 4 plays, 85 yards, 2:18.**
- LAR – Van Jefferson 2-yard pass from Matthew Stafford (Matt Gay kick), 3:27. Rams 30–7. **Drive: 10 plays, 62 yards, 5:09.**

**Fourth quarter**

- LAR – Odell Beckham Jr. 1-yard pass from Matthew Stafford (Matt Gay kick), 10:52. Rams 37–7. **Drive: 10 plays, 55 yards, 5:35.**

**Top passers**

- JAX – Trevor Lawrence – 16/28, 145 yards
- LAR – Matthew Stafford – 26/38, 295 yards, 3 TD

**Top rushers**

- JAX – Carlos Hyde – 9 rushes, 24 yards, TD
- LAR – Sony Michel – 24 rushes, 121 yards, TD

**Top receivers**

- JAX – Laquon Treadwell – 4 receptions, 62 yards
- LAR – Cooper Kupp – 8 receptions, 129 yards, TD

The Rams put an end to their three-game losing streak by dominating the visiting Jaguars at SoFi Stadium. Running back Sony Michel ran for 121 yards and scored on a 5-yard touchdown run as the Rams built a 10–0 lead in the first quarter. Kicker Matt Gay added three first half field goals of 40, 44, and 37 yards for a 16–7 Rams advantage at the intermission. Quarterback Matthew Stafford completed 26 of 38 passes for 295 yards with touchdown passes in the third quarter to wide receivers Cooper Kupp (29 yards) and Van Jefferson (2 yards), and then another to fellow wide receiver Odell Beckham Jr. from one yard out in the fourth quarter. Linebacker Ernest Jones lead the Rams with nine tackles, including a shared sack with Leonard Floyd, while Jalen Ramsey and Taylor Rapp had one fumble recovery each in L.A.'s rout in what would be the team's largest margin of victory for the season.

==== Week 14: at Arizona Cardinals ====
Week 14: Los Angeles Rams at Arizona Cardinals – Game summary

| Quarter | 1 | 2 | 3 | 4 | Total |
|---|---|---|---|---|---|
| **Rams** | 0 | 13 | 14 | 3 | **30** |
| Cardinals | 3 | 10 | 0 | 10 | **23** |

at State Farm Stadium, Glendale, Arizona

- Date: December 13
- Game time: 6:15 p.m. MST/5:15 p.m. PST
- Game weather: Partly cloudy, 65 °F (18 °C) (retractable roof open)
- Game attendance: 63,999
- Referee: Carl Cheffers
- TV announcers (ESPN/ABC/ESPN+): Steve Levy, Brian Griese, Louis Riddick, Lisa Salters, and John Parry
- Recap, Game Book

Game information

**First quarter**

- ARI – Matt Prater 53-yard field goal, 10:58. Cardinals 3–0. **Drive: 10 plays, 40 yards, 4:02.**

**Second quarter**

- LAR – Odell Beckham Jr. 2-yard pass from Matthew Stafford (Matt Gay kick), 12:53. Rams 7–3. **Drive: 10 plays, 68 yards, 5:57.**
- LAR – Matt Gay 55-yard field goal, 7:23. Rams 10–3. **Drive: 8 plays, 34 yards, 2:54.**
- ARI – James Conner 1-yard run (Matt Prater kick), 3:18. Tied 10–10. **Drive: 9 plays, 75 yards, 4:05.**
- LAR – Matt Gay 35-yard field goal, 0:35. Rams 13–10. **Drive: 7 plays, 53 yards, 2:43.**
- ARI – Matt Prater 53-yard field goal, 0:00. Tied 13–13. **Drive: 6 plays, 40 yards, 0:35.**

**Third quarter**

- LAR – Van Jefferson 52-yard pass from Matthew Stafford (Matt Gay kick), 13:36. Rams 20–13. **Drive: 3 plays, 75 yards, 1:24.**
- LAR – Cooper Kupp 4-yard pass from Matthew Stafford (Matt Gay kick), 9:45. Rams 27–13. **Drive: 7 plays, 19 yards, 3:19.**

**Fourth quarter**

- ARI – James Conner 8-yard run (Matt Prater kick), 13:38. Rams 27–20. **Drive: 6 plays, 73 yards, 3:07.**
- LAR – Matt Gay 33-yard field goal, 7:20. Rams 30–20. **Drive: 10 plays, 60 yards, 6:18.**
- ARI – Matt Prater 49-yard field goal, 0:37. Rams 30–23. **Drive: 11 plays, 56 yards, 2:07.**

**Top passers**

- LAR – Matthew Stafford – 23/30, 287 yards, 3 TD
- ARI – Kyler Murray – 32/49, 383 yards, 2 INT

**Top rushers**

- LAR – Sony Michel – 20 rushes, 79 yards
- ARI – Kyler Murray – 7 rushes, 61 yards

**Top receivers**

- LAR – Cooper Kupp – 13 receptions, 123 yards, TD
- ARI – A. J. Green – 7 receptions, 102 yards

Despite going in with a depleted lineup that was missing six starters (including cornerback Jalen Ramsey and tight end Tyler Higbee) due to an outbreak of COVID-19, the Rams came up with big plays to thwart the host Cardinals at State Farm Stadium with a 30–23 victory on Monday Night Football that opened up the NFC West title race. Odell Beckham Jr.'s sliding touchdown catch early in the third quarter was his third TD score in as many games. Kicker Matt Gay nailed two field goals, including a season-long 55-yarder, as the score was tied 13–13 at halftime. In the third period, the Rams surged ahead as quarterback Matthew Stafford threw touchdown passes of 52 yards to Van Jefferson and 4 yards to Cooper Kupp to give the Rams a 27–13 lead. Kupp totaled a season-high 13 receptions while running back Sony Michel added 79 yards on the ground for the Rams. Defensive tackle Aaron Donald was named NFC Defensive Player of the Week after totaling three of his team's four sacks, while linebacker Leonard Floyd added a team-high eight tackles and an interception as the Rams won for the seventh straight time in Arizona since the 2014 season.

==== Week 15: vs. Seattle Seahawks ====
Week 15: Seattle Seahawks at Los Angeles Rams – Game summary

| Quarter | 1 | 2 | 3 | 4 | Total |
|---|---|---|---|---|---|
| Seahawks | 0 | 3 | 7 | 0 | **10** |
| **Rams** | 3 | 0 | 7 | 10 | **20** |

at SoFi Stadium, Inglewood, California

- Date: December 21
- Game time: 4:00 p.m. PST
- Game weather: 61 °F (16 °C), sunny
- Game attendance: 71,565
- Referee: Shawn Hochuli
- TV announcers (Fox): Chris Myers, Brock Huard and Jen Hale
- Recap, Game Book

Game information

**First quarter**

- LAR – Matt Gay 55-yard field goal, 8:16. Rams 3–0. **Drive: 9 plays, 29 yards, 6:44.**

**Second quarter**

- SEA – Jason Myers 39-yard field goal, 0:10. Tied 3–3. **Drive: 7 plays, 47 yards, 1:46.**

**Third quarter**

- SEA – DeeJay Dallas 4-yard run (Jason Myers kick), 9:23. Seahawks 10–3. **Drive: 11 plays, 75 yards, 5:37.**
- LAR – Cooper Kupp 6-yard pass from Matthew Stafford (Matt Gay kick), 6:31. Tied 10–10. **Drive: 6 plays, 86 yards, 2:52.**

**Fourth quarter**

- LAR – Cooper Kupp 29-yard pass from Matthew Stafford (Matt Gay kick), 10:48. Rams 17–10. **Drive: 8 plays, 88 yards, 5:13.**
- LAR – Matt Gay 35-yard field goal, 1:51. Rams 20–10. **Drive: 5 plays, 18 yards, 1:30.**

**Top passers**

- SEA – Russell Wilson – 17/31, 156 yards, INT
- LAR – Matthew Stafford – 21/29, 244 yards, 2 TD, INT

**Top rushers**

- SEA – DeeJay Dallas – 8 rushes, 41 yards, TD
- LAR – Sony Michel – 18 rushes, 92 yards

**Top receivers**

- SEA – Gerald Everett – 4 receptions, 60 yards
- LAR – Cooper Kupp – 9 receptions, 136 yards, 2 TD

In a game that was postponed for two days due to COVID-19 concerns, the Rams surged ahead in the second half to defeat the NFC West rival Seahawks at SoFi Stadium for their third straight victory. Kicker Matt Gay converted a season-long 55-yard field goal to finish L.A.'s opening drive of the game, which was knotted 3–3 at halftime. Seattle took the lead early in the third quarter on a 4-yard TD run by running back DeeJay Dallas, but the Rams responded as Matthew Stafford connected with Cooper Kupp for a 32-yard pass completion and running back Sony Michel broke off a 39-yard run (the Rams' longest run from scrimmage for the season) down to the Seahawks' 6-yard-line. Two plays later, Stafford and Kupp hooked up again for the tying touchdown. Michel, who ran for 92 yards on 18 carries, caught a swing pass from Stafford for 24 yards, which would lead to a 29-yard touchdown pass from Stafford to Kupp to give the Rams a 17–10 lead. Following an exchange of punts, Seattle drove to midfield but was stopped on downs, and Michel had a 17-yard run to set up Gay's second field goal of the game, this time from 35 yards with 1:51 remaining. The Seahawks' last scoring threat was snuffed out when safety Taylor Rapp intercepted Russell Wilson with less than a minute remaining. Stafford completed 21 of 29 passes for 244 yards with two TD passes to Kupp, who caught nine passes for 136 yards. Linebacker Ernest Jones led the Rams with 11 combined tackles, while Aaron Donald, Leonard Floyd, and Von Miller had one sack each.

==== Week 16: at Minnesota Vikings ====
Week 16: Los Angeles Rams at Minnesota Vikings – Game summary

| Quarter | 1 | 2 | 3 | 4 | Total |
|---|---|---|---|---|---|
| **Rams** | 7 | 6 | 7 | 10 | **30** |
| Vikings | 0 | 3 | 10 | 10 | **23** |

at U.S. Bank Stadium, Minneapolis, Minnesota

- Date: December 26
- Game time: 12:00 p.m. CST/10:00 a.m. PST
- Game weather: None (indoor stadium)
- Game attendance: 66,708
- Referee: John Hussey
- TV announcers (Fox): Adam Amin, Mark Schlereth and Shannon Spake
- Recap, Game Book

Game information

**First quarter**

- LAR – Sony Michel 1-yard run (Matt Gay kick), 7:13. Rams 7–0. **Drive: 12 plays, 70 yards, 5:44.**

**Second quarter**

- LAR – Matt Gay 32-yard field goal, 6:37. Rams 10–0. **Drive: 10 plays, 56 yards, 5:31.**
- MIN – Greg Joseph 23-yard field goal, 2:34. Rams 10–3. **Drive: 4 plays, 7 yards, 1:28.**
- LAR – Matt Gay 31-yard field goal, 0:11. Rams 13–3. **Drive: 13 plays, 62 yards, 2:23.**

**Third quarter**

- MIN – Alexander Mattison 2-yard run (Greg Joseph kick), 11:01. Rams 13–10. **Drive: 1 play, 2 yards, 0:06.**
- LAR – Brandon Powell 61-yard punt return (Matt Gay kick), 7:06. Rams 20–10.
- MIN – Greg Joseph 24-yard field goal, 1:31. Rams 20–13. **Drive: 12 plays, 83 yards, 5:35.**

**Fourth quarter**

- LAR – Odell Beckham Jr. 7-yard pass from Matthew Stafford (Matt Gay kick), 11:37. Rams 27–13. **Drive: 11 plays, 75 yards, 4:54.**
- MIN – K. J. Osborn 6-yard pass from Kirk Cousins (Greg Joseph kick), 8:21. Rams 27–20. **Drive: 7 plays, 75 yards, 3:16.**
- LAR – Matt Gay 24-yard field goal, 2:03. Rams 30–20. **Drive: 13 plays, 69 yards, 6:18.**
- MIN – Greg Joseph 44-yard field goal, 0:32. Rams 30–23. **Drive: 8 plays, 49 yards, 1:31.**

**Top passers**

- LAR – Matthew Stafford – 21/37, 197 yards, TD, 3 INT
- MIN – Kirk Cousins – 27/38, 315 yards, TD, INT

**Top rushers**

- LAR – Sony Michel – 27 rushes, 131 yards, TD
- MIN – Alexander Mattison – 13 rushes, 41 yards, TD

**Top receivers**

- LAR – Cooper Kupp – 10 receptions, 109 yards
- MIN – Justin Jefferson – 8 receptions, 116 yards

The Rams took an early lead and maintained their advantage throughout in securing an NFC playoff spot with their 10th win of the season. Los Angeles drove 70 yards in 12 plays before Sony Michel scored on a 1-yard touchdown run. Michel turned in a season-best 131 yards on 27 carries, including 43 yards on five attempts which helped to set up a 32-yard field goal by Matt Gay to give L.A. a 10–0 lead. After the Vikings scored a field goal following a Matthew Stafford interception, Gay added a second field goal just before halftime to put the Rams ahead 13–3. Minnesota linebacker Anthony Barr got a second interception that led to a 2-yard touchdown run by Alexander Mattison. Return man Brandon Powell was named NFC Special Teams Player of the Week after returning a punt 61 yards for a score to extend the Rams' lead to 20–10. Stafford then threw a 7-yard touchdown pass to Odell Beckham Jr. early in the fourth quarter to put L.A. up by two touchdowns and Gay added a third field goal. Minnesota scored late to close to within 30–23 with just over a minute remaining, but Van Jefferson covered the onside kick attempt to preserve the Rams' victory. Cooper Kupp again led the team in receptions with 10 catches for 109 yards while cornerback Jalen Ramsey and safety Taylor Rapp shared the team lead in tackles with seven each.

==== Week 17: at Baltimore Ravens ====
Week 17: Los Angeles Rams at Baltimore Ravens – Game summary

| Quarter | 1 | 2 | 3 | 4 | Total |
|---|---|---|---|---|---|
| **Rams** | 0 | 7 | 0 | 13 | **20** |
| Ravens | 7 | 6 | 3 | 3 | **19** |

at M&T Bank Stadium, Baltimore, Maryland

- Date: January 2
- Game time: 1:00 p.m. EST/10:00 a.m. PST
- Game weather: Cloudy, 62 °F (17 °C)
- Game attendance: 70,328
- Referee: Bill Vinovich
- TV announcers (Fox): Adam Amin, Greg Olsen, and Pam Oliver
- Recap, Game Book

Game information

**First quarter**

- BAL – Chuck Clark 17-yard interception return (Justin Tucker kick), 1:58. Ravens 7–0.

**Second quarter**

- BAL – Justin Tucker 22-yard field goal, 3:41. Ravens 10–0. **Drive: 15 plays, 91 yards, 9:00.**
- LAR – Cooper Kupp 18-yard pass from Matthew Stafford (Matt Gay kick), 0:55. Ravens 10–7. **Drive: 3 plays, 29 yards, 0:34.**
- BAL – Justin Tucker 46-yard field goal, 0:02. Ravens 13–7. **Drive: 9 plays, 51 yards, 0:53.**

**Third quarter**

- BAL – Justin Tucker 46-yard field goal, 4:42. Ravens 16–7. **Drive: 14 plays, 52 yards, 6:23.**

**Fourth quarter**

- LAR – Sony Michel 1-yard run (Matt Gay kick), 12:09. Ravens 16–14. **Drive: 7 plays, 55 yards, 3:48.**
- BAL – Justin Tucker 34-yard field goal, 4:30. Ravens 19–14. **Drive: 12 plays, 59 yards, 7:39.**
- LAR – Odell Beckham Jr. 7-yard pass from Matthew Stafford (pass failed), 0:57. Rams 20–19. **Drive: 9 plays, 75 yards, 3:33.**

**Top passers**

- LAR – Matthew Stafford – 26/35, 309 yards, 2 TD, 2 INT
- BAL – Tyler Huntley – 20/32, 197 yards, INT

**Top rushers**

- LAR – Sony Michel– 19 rushes, 74 yards, TD
- BAL – Devonta Freeman – 14 rushes, 76 yards

**Top receivers**

- LAR – Cooper Kupp – 6 receptions, 95 yards, TD
- BAL – Mark Andrews – 6 receptions, 89 yards

Odell Beckham Jr. scored on a 7-yard touchdown pass from Matthew Stafford with 57 seconds remaining to give the Rams franchise its first-ever win over the Ravens in Baltimore as well as their first win in Baltimore since 1969. Los Angeles kept the Ravens offense out of the end zone, with Baltimore's lone touchdown coming off a Stafford pass that was intercepted by Ravens strong safety Chuck Clark and returned 17 yards for the game's initial score late in the first quarter. Clark intercepted Stafford a second time on the next drive to end a Rams scoring threat, and the Ravens drove 91 yards in 15 plays but were held to a Justin Tucker field goal. Down 10–0, the Rams got a big break with less than two minutes remaining in the half when L.A. strong safety Jordan Fuller intercepted a pass from Ravens quarterback Tyler Huntley, which ultimately set up an 18-yard touchdown pass from Stafford to wide receiver Cooper Kupp. Baltimore extended its lead to 16–7 with two more field goals from Tucker before Rams running back Sony Michel (19 rushes, 74 yards) scored on a 1-yard run early in the fourth quarter to bring Los Angeles to within two. The Ravens drove inside the Rams 10 on their next drive, but Aaron Donald and Leonard Floyd combined for a sack of Huntley that forced Baltimore to settle for a fourth field goal by Tucker with 4:30 remaining. Starting from his own 25, Stafford led the Rams' comeback by completing five straight passes, including a critical fourth down-and-5 catch by Beckham to keep the drive alive with just over a minute remaining. Stafford and Beckham then connected for the game-winning score on the next play to give the Rams the lead for the first and only time of the game. Baltimore's last attempt to rally was snuffed out when linebacker Von Miller sacked Huntley at the Ravens 30. Aaron Donald then forced a fumble on a lateral play that was recovered by Darious Williams as time ran out as the Rams claimed their fifth consecutive victory. Stafford completed 26 of 35 passes for 309 yards and two TDs with two INTs, while Kupp had six receptions for 95 yards and a score.

==== Week 18: vs. San Francisco 49ers ====
Week 18: San Francisco 49ers at Los Angeles Rams – Game summary

| Quarter | 1 | 2 | 3 | 4 | OT | Total |
|---|---|---|---|---|---|---|
| **49ers** | 0 | 3 | 14 | 7 | 3 | **27** |
| Rams | 3 | 14 | 0 | 7 | 0 | **24** |

at SoFi Stadium, Inglewood, California

- Date: January 9
- Game time: 1:25 p.m. PST
- Game weather: Sunny, 74 °F (23 °C)
- Game attendance: 74,447
- Referee: Jerome Boger
- TV announcers (Fox): Joe Buck, Troy Aikman, Erin Andrews and Tom Rinaldi
- Recap, Game Book

Game information

**First quarter**

- LAR – Matt Gay 43-yard field goal, 6:07. Rams 3–0. **Drive: 13 plays, 62 yards, 8:53.**

**Second quarter**

- LAR – Tyler Higbee 2-yard pass from Matthew Stafford (Matt Gay kick), 10:26. Rams 10–0. **Drive: 12 plays, 61 yards, 6:25.**
- LAR – Tyler Higbee 15-yard pass from Matthew Stafford (Matt Gay kick), 6:44. Rams 17–0. **Drive: 3 plays, 19 yards, 1:30.**
- SF – Robbie Gould 42-yard field goal, 0:00. Rams 17–3. **Drive: 6 plays, 61 yards, 0:38.**

**Third quarter**

- SF – Deebo Samuel 16-yard run (Robbie Gould kick), 10:32. Rams 17–10. **Drive: 7 plays, 75 yards, 4:28.**
- SF – Jauan Jennings 24-yard pass from Deebo Samuel (Robbie Gould kick), 1:46. Tied 17–17. **Drive: 11 plays, 74 yards, 7:02.**

**Fourth quarter**

- LAR – Cooper Kupp 4-yard pass from Matthew Stafford (Matt Gay kick), 2:29. Rams 24–17. **Drive: 9 plays, 92 yards, 5:13.**
- SF – Jauan Jennings 14-yard pass from Jimmy Garoppolo (Robbie Gould kick), 0:26. Tied 24–24. **Drive: 5 plays, 88 yards, 1:01.**

**Overtime**

- SF – Robbie Gould 24-yard field goal, 2:45. 49ers 27–24. **Drive: 12 plays, 69 yards, 7:15.**

**Top passers**

- SF – Jimmy Garoppolo – 23/32, 316 yards, TD, 2 INT
- LAR – Matthew Stafford – 21/32, 238 yards, 3 TD, 2 INT

**Top rushers**

- SF – Elijah Mitchell – 21 rushes, 85 yards
- LAR – Sony Michel – 21 rushes, 43 yards

**Top receivers**

- SF – Brandon Aiyuk – 6 receptions, 107 yards
- LAR – Cooper Kupp – 7 receptions, 118 yards, TD

Despite building a 17–0 lead in the second quarter, the Rams squandered their chance to lock up the NFC's No. 2 seed as well as the NFC West title in falling to rival San Francisco for the sixth straight time. The loss, which snapped a five-game win streak for the Rams, was also the first under head coach Sean McVay in which his team had led at halftime (a streak that had stretched to 45 games). Los Angeles built its first half advantage thanks to kicker Matt Gay's 43-yard field goal in the first quarter and two touchdown receptions by tight end Tyler Higbee from quarterback Matthew Stafford. But the 49ers got on the scoreboard as the second quarter ended on a 42-yard field goal by kicker Robbie Gould, then seized the game's momentum by scoring twice in the third quarter as versatile wide receiver Deebo Samuel scored on a 16-yard run and then tossed a 24-yard touchdown pass to Jauan Jennings to tie the game at 17–17. The Rams turned the tide in the fourth quarter when cornerback Jalen Ramsey made an acrobatic interception of Jimmy Garoppolo in the end zone, which sparked a 92-yard touchdown drive. Stafford, who finished with 238 yards passing to set a new Rams single-season passing yards record (4,886 yards), found Cooper Kupp for a 4-yard touchdown pass with 2:29 remaining to take a 24–17 lead. Kupp, who finished with a game-high seven catches for 118 yards and a score, ended the season leading the NFL in receptions (145), receiving yardage (1,947), and touchdown catches (16) to become only the fourth player in pro football history to lead the league in all three categories in the same season, and his single-season numbers for receptions and receiving yards were the second-highest totals in NFL history. But after the teams traded punts, the Rams were unable to stop the 49ers as Garoppolo threw a 14-yard touchdown pass to Jennings with 26 seconds left that (following a Gould PAT) tied the game. In overtime, the 49ers drove 12 plays in 69 yards to set up a 24-yard field goal by Gould for a 27–24 lead. With under two minutes left, the Rams drove to near midfield but Stafford's final pass intended for Odell Beckham Jr. was intercepted by 49ers cornerback Ambry Thomas to end the game. Despite the loss, Seattle's 38–30 win at Arizona that had ended minutes earlier clinched for the Rams their third NFC West Division title in five seasons.

=== Standings ===
==== Division ====
NFC West
| | W | L | T | PCT | DIV | CONF | PF | PA | STK |
|---|---|---|---|---|---|---|---|---|---|
| ^{(4)} Los Angeles Rams | 12 | 5 | 0 | .706 | 3–3 | 8–4 | 460 | 372 | L1 |
| ^{(5)} Arizona Cardinals | 11 | 6 | 0 | .647 | 4–2 | 7–5 | 449 | 366 | L1 |
| ^{(6)} San Francisco 49ers | 10 | 7 | 0 | .588 | 2–4 | 7–5 | 427 | 365 | W2 |
| Seattle Seahawks | 7 | 10 | 0 | .412 | 3–3 | 4–8 | 395 | 366 | W2 |

==== Conference ====
NFC
| # | Team | Division | W | L | T | PCT | DIV | CONF | SOS | SOV | STK |
|---|---|---|---|---|---|---|---|---|---|---|---|
**Division winners**
| 1 (Note: Green Bay finished ahead of Tampa Bay based on conference record (9–3 vs. 8–4), claiming the No. 1 seed.) | Green Bay Packers | North | 13 | 4 | 0 | .765 | 4–2 | 9–3 | .479 | .480 | L1 |
| 2 | Tampa Bay Buccaneers | South | 13 | 4 | 0 | .765 | 4–2 | 8–4 | .467 | .443 | W3 |
| 3 (Note: Dallas claimed the No. 3 seed over LA Rams based on conference record (10–2 vs. 8–4).) | Dallas Cowboys | East | 12 | 5 | 0 | .706 | 6–0 | 10–2 | .488 | .431 | W1 |
| 4 | Los Angeles Rams | West | 12 | 5 | 0 | .706 | 3–3 | 8–4 | .483 | .409 | L1 |
**Wild cards**
| 5 | Arizona Cardinals | West | 11 | 6 | 0 | .647 | 4–2 | 7–5 | .490 | .492 | L1 |
| 6 | San Francisco 49ers | West | 10 | 7 | 0 | .588 | 2–4 | 7–5 | .500 | .438 | W2 |
| 7 (Note: Philadelphia finished ahead of New Orleans based on head-to-head victory, claiming the 7th and final playoff spot.) | Philadelphia Eagles | East | 9 | 8 | 0 | .529 | 3–3 | 7–5 | .469 | .350 | L1 |
**Did not qualify for the postseason**
| 8 | New Orleans Saints | South | 9 | 8 | 0 | .529 | 4–2 | 7–5 | .512 | .516 | W2 |
| 9 | Minnesota Vikings | North | 8 | 9 | 0 | .471 | 4–2 | 6–6 | .507 | .434 | W1 |
| 10 (Note: Washington finished ahead of Atlanta and Seattle based on head-to-head victories.) | Washington Football Team | East | 7 | 10 | 0 | .412 | 2–4 | 6–6 | .529 | .420 | W1 |
| 11 (Note: Seattle finished ahead of Atlanta based on win percentage in common games (4–2 vs. 3–3 against: San Francisco, New Orleans, Jacksonville, Washington, and Detroit).) | Seattle Seahawks | West | 7 | 10 | 0 | .412 | 3–3 | 4–8 | .519 | .424 | W2 |
| 12 | Atlanta Falcons | South | 7 | 10 | 0 | .412 | 2–4 | 4–8 | .472 | .315 | L2 |
| 13 | Chicago Bears | North | 6 | 11 | 0 | .353 | 2–4 | 4–8 | .524 | .373 | L1 |
| 14 | Carolina Panthers | South | 5 | 12 | 0 | .294 | 2–4 | 3–9 | .509 | .412 | L7 |
| 15 | New York Giants | East | 4 | 13 | 0 | .235 | 1–5 | 3–9 | .536 | .485 | L6 |
| 16 | Detroit Lions | North | 3 | 13 | 1 | .206 | 2–4 | 3–9 | .528 | .627 | W1 |
**Tiebreakers** (Note: When breaking ties for three or more teams under the NFL's rules, they are first broken within divisions, then comparing only the highest-ranked remaining team from each division.)

== Postseason ==
=== Schedule ===
| Round | Date | Time (PST) | Opponent (seed) | Result | Record | Venue | TV | Recap |
|---|---|---|---|---|---|---|---|---|
| Wild Card | January 17 | 5:15 p.m. | Arizona Cardinals (5) | W 34–11 | 1–0 | SoFi Stadium | ESPN/ABC | Recap |
| Divisional | January 23 | 12:00 p.m. | at Tampa Bay Buccaneers (2) | W 30–27 | 2–0 | Raymond James Stadium | NBC | Recap |
| NFC Championship | January 30 | 3:40 p.m. | San Francisco 49ers (6) | W 20–17 | 3–0 | SoFi Stadium | Fox | Recap |
| Super Bowl LVI | February 13 | 3:30 p.m. | vs. Cincinnati Bengals (A4) | W 23–20 | 4–0 | SoFi Stadium | NBC | Recap |

=== Game summaries ===
==== NFC Wild Card Playoffs: vs. (5) Arizona Cardinals ====
NFC Wild Card Playoffs: (5) Arizona Cardinals at (4) Los Angeles Rams – Game summary

| Quarter | 1 | 2 | 3 | 4 | Total |
|---|---|---|---|---|---|
| Cardinals | 0 | 0 | 8 | 3 | 11 |
| Rams | 7 | 14 | 7 | 6 | 34 |

at SoFi Stadium, Inglewood, California

- Date: January 17, 2022
- Game time: 5:15 p.m. PST
- Game weather: Cloudy, 63 °F (17 °C)
- Game attendance: 70,625
- Referee: Clay Martin
- TV announcers (ABC/ESPN): Steve Levy, Brian Griese, Louis Riddick, and Lisa Salters
- Recap, Game Book

Game information

First quarter

- LAR – Odell Beckham Jr. 4-yard pass from Matthew Stafford (Matt Gay kick), 3:50. Rams 7–0. Drive: 10 plays, 52 yards, 6:05.

Second quarter

- LAR – Matthew Stafford 1-yard run (Matt Gay kick), 11:58. Rams 14–0. Drive: 9 plays, 68 yards, 5:17.
- LAR – David Long 3-yard interception return (Matt Gay kick), 7:59. Rams 21–0.

Third quarter

- LAR – Cooper Kupp 7-yard pass from Matthew Stafford (Matt Gay kick), 10:36. Rams 28–0. Drive: 8 plays, 75 yards, 4:24.
- ARI – James Conner 2-yard run (Kyler Murray–Antoine Wesley pass), 4:11. Rams 28–8. Drive: 12 plays, 75 yards, 6:25.

Fourth quarter

- LAR – Matt Gay 37-yard field goal, 14:55. Rams 31–8. Drive: 7 plays, 50 yards, 4:16.
- ARI – Matt Prater 55-yard field goal, 10:13. Rams 31–11. Drive: 10 plays, 38 yards, 4:42.
- LAR – Matt Gay 46-yard field goal, 4:21. Rams 34–11. Drive: 9 plays, 61 yards, 5:52.

Top passers

- ARI – Kyler Murray – 19/34, 137 yards, 2 INT
- LAR – Matthew Stafford – 13/17, 202 yards, 2 TD

Top rushers

- ARI – Chase Edmonds – 8 rushes, 28 yards
- LAR – Sony Michel – 13 rushes, 58 yards

Top receivers

- ARI – Christian Kirk – 6 receptions, 51 yards
- LAR – Cooper Kupp – 5 receptions, 61 yards, TD

Hosting the first-ever playoff game on Monday Night Football, the Los Angeles Rams thoroughly dominated NFC West rival Arizona in the first postseason game held at SoFi Stadium. Quarterback Matthew Stafford had an efficient and effective night, completing 13 of 17 passes for 202 yards and two touchdowns. His first scoring pass went to wide receiver Odell Beckham Jr. on a 4-yard catch midway through the first quarter that was the first postseason touchdown of Beckham's career. In the second period, Stafford and Beckham connected again on 30-yard pass that helped to set up a 1-yard score by Stafford to put the Rams ahead 14–0. L.A.'s defense smothered the Cardinals throughout the first half, holding Arizona without a first down on its first four drives. Cardinals quarterback Kyler Murray was constantly harassed by Rams defenders and was held to just 143 total yards, including just six yards rushing. Facing third-and-7 from the Arizona 4, Murray tried to evade Rams linebacker Troy Reeder and as he fell threw a desperation pass that was easily picked off at the 3-yard-line by cornerback David Long Jr. and resulted in the shortest interception return for a touchdown in NFL playoff history. In the third quarter, Beckham fielded a lateral from Stafford, then tossed a 40-yard pass to running back Cam Akers as the Rams drove down the field on their first possession of the second half. Wide receiver Cooper Kupp capped the drive with a 7-yard touchdown reception from Stafford. Kupp finished with five receptions for 61 yards, Beckham had four catches for 54 yards, and tight end Tyler Higbee added three receptions for 46 yards. Akers and Sony Michel combined for over 100 yards on the ground as the Rams offense was turnover-free. On defense, linebacker Von Miller led the team with six total tackles including a sack, while defensive tackle Marquise Copeland added an interception. Kicker Matt Gay converted two field goals (37, 46) in the fourth quarter and punter Johnny Hekker had all five of his punts downed inside the 20.

==== NFC Divisional Playoffs: at (2) Tampa Bay Buccaneers ====
NFC Divisional Playoffs: (4) Los Angeles Rams at (2) Tampa Bay Buccaneers – Game summary

| Quarter | 1 | 2 | 3 | 4 | Total |
|---|---|---|---|---|---|
| Rams | 10 | 10 | 7 | 3 | 30 |
| Buccaneers | 3 | 0 | 10 | 14 | 27 |

at Raymond James Stadium, Tampa, Florida

- Date: January 23, 2022
- Game time: 3:00 p.m. EST/12:00 p.m. PST
- Game weather: Cloudy, 52 °F (11 °C)
- Game attendance: 65,597
- Referee: Shawn Hochuli
- TV announcers (NBC): Al Michaels, Cris Collinsworth, Michele Tafoya, and Kathryn Tappen
- Recap, Game Book

Kicker Matt Gay's 30-yard field goal as time expired sent the Rams to the NFC Championship Game for the 11th time in franchise history. Los Angeles built a 27–3 lead over the defending Super Bowl champions before Tampa Bay rallied to score 24 unanswered points to tie the game with 42 seconds remaining. Gay converted field goals of 26 and 40 yards in the first and second quarters, respectively, while quarterback Matthew Stafford threw touchdown passes of 7 yards to tight end Kendall Blanton and 70 yards to wide receiver Cooper Kupp to put the Rams ahead late in the first half. Cornerback Nick Scott picked off a pass by Buccaneers quarterback Tom Brady to set up another Rams scoring opportunity with under two minutes remaining, but running back Cam Akers, making his first start of the season, was stripped of the ball at the Tampa Bay 1 to leave the score 20–3 at halftime in favor of Los Angeles. Stafford added a touchdown on a 1-yard sneak to put the Rams up by 24. After the Buccaneers added a field goal, a fumble by Kupp on the Rams' next possession was recovered by Tampa Bay, leading to a 1-yard touchdown by running back Leonard Fournette. Los Angeles squandered additional opportunities to put the game away, as linebacker Von Miller's strip sack of Brady gave L.A. a first down at the Tampa Bay 25, only for an errant shotgun snap on the Rams' next offensive play that gave the ball right back to the Buccaneers. Later in the fourth quarter, the Rams drove down the field, but Gay came up short on a 45-yard attempt with 6:36 remaining. Following another exchange of possessions, Brady threw a 55-yard touchdown pass to wide receiver Mike Evans to close to within 27–20 with 3:20 left. On the Rams' next possession, Akers fumbled for the second time in the game, giving Tampa Bay the ball at L.A.'s 30. Seven plays later, Fournette scored his second touchdown of the day on a 9-yard run to tie the score. With just 42 seconds remaining, Stafford shrugged off a first down sack and connected with Cooper Kupp for a 20-yard gain to the Rams' 44. Stafford and Kupp then hooked up on the very next play for a 44-yard pass over the middle as Kupp (9 receptions, 183 yards) beat Buccaneers free safety Antoine Winfield Jr. in single coverage down to the Tampa Bay 12. Stafford then spiked the ball with four seconds remaining to set up Gay's winning kick. It was the Rams' third win over the Buccaneers in three postseason meetings, the last two occurring in NFC Championship Games in 1979 and 1999. With the victory, Rams head coach Sean McVay surpassed John Robinson for the most postseason wins as a coach in team history (Robinson was 4–6 in the playoffs from 1983 to 1991).

==== NFC Championship: vs. (6) San Francisco 49ers ====
NFC Championship: (6) San Francisco 49ers at (4) Los Angeles Rams – Game summary

| Quarter | 1 | 2 | 3 | 4 | Total |
|---|---|---|---|---|---|
| 49ers | 0 | 10 | 7 | 0 | 17 |
| Rams | 0 | 7 | 0 | 13 | 20 |

at SoFi Stadium, Inglewood, California

- Date: January 30, 2022
- Game time: 3:40 p.m. PST
- Game weather: Sunny, 62 °F (17 °C)
- Game attendance: 73,202
- Referee: Carl Cheffers
- TV announcers (Fox): Joe Buck, Troy Aikman, Erin Andrews, and Tom Rinaldi
- Recap, Game Book

Game information

First quarter

- No scoring plays.

Second quarter

- LAR – Cooper Kupp 16-yard pass from Matthew Stafford (Matt Gay kick), 8:46. Rams 7–0. Drive: 18 plays, 97 yards, 9:33.
- SF – Deebo Samuel 44-yard pass from Jimmy Garoppolo (Robbie Gould kick), 6:10. Tied 7–7. Drive: 4 plays, 75 yards, 2:36.
- SF – Robbie Gould 38-yard field goal, 0:00. 49ers 10–7. Drive: 8 plays, 36 yards, 1:50.

Third quarter

- SF – George Kittle 16-yard pass from Jimmy Garoppolo (Robbie Gould kick), 1:59. 49ers 17–7. Drive: 10 plays, 58 yards, 5:54.

Fourth quarter

- LAR – Cooper Kupp 11-yard pass from Matthew Stafford (Matt Gay kick), 13:30. 49ers 17–14. Drive: 7 plays, 75 yards, 3:29.
- LAR – Matt Gay 40-yard field goal, 6:49. Tied 17–17. Drive: 9 plays, 63 yards, 3:06.
- LAR – Matt Gay 30-yard field goal, 1:46. Rams 20–17. Drive: 10 plays, 49 yards, 4:40.

Top passers

- SF – Jimmy Garoppolo – 16/30, 232 yards, 2 TD, INT
- LAR – Matthew Stafford – 31/45, 337 yards, 2 TD, INT

Top rushers

- SF – Deebo Samuel – 7 rushes, 26 yards
- LAR – Cam Akers – 13 rushes, 48 yards

Top receivers

- SF – Deebo Samuel – 4 receptions, 72 yards, TD
- LAR – Cooper Kupp – 11 receptions, 142 yards, 2 TD

Rallying from a 10-point deficit at the start of the fourth quarter, the Los Angeles Rams overcame the rival San Francisco 49ers 20–17 to win the NFC Championship Game for the second time in four seasons. While it was the Rams franchise's fourth straight win in a conference title game dating back to 1999, the victory was the first for the team while playing at home in Southern California (the Rams had been defeated in conference championship games played at the Los Angeles Memorial Coliseum in 1975 and 1978). Following a scoreless first quarter, Los Angeles took the lead on quarterback Matthew Stafford's 16-yard touchdown pass to wide receiver Cooper Kupp midway through the second period to cap off a 16-play, 97-yard drive that consumed 9 minutes and 33 seconds. The 49ers, who came into the game with six straight regular season wins over the Rams, surged ahead with 17 unanswered points as quarterback Jimmy Garoppolo threw touchdown passes to wide receiver Deebo Samuel (44 yards) in the second quarter and tight end George Kittle (16 yards) in the third, while kicker Robbie Gould converted a 38-yard field goal at the end of the first half. Stafford shrugged off an early interception and two sacks to throw for 337 yards and following the 49ers' last touchdown, answered with a 75-yard drive in seven plays that ended with an 11-yard touchdown pass to Kupp. The Rams' defense was effective in neutralizing San Francisco's running game, allowing just 50 yards on the ground for the night and forced a punt at midfield on the next drive. Stafford connected twice with wide receiver Odell Beckham Jr. on key receptions to set up a 40-yard field goal by kicker Matt Gay to tie the score at 17–17 with 6:53 remaining. The Rams defense forced the 49ers to punt again, and Stafford completed five straight passes for 53 yards and Gay's 30-yard field goal put the Rams ahead 20–17 with 1:46 left. Though never sacked, Garoppolo faced increasing pressure in the fourth quarter. Backed up on the 49er 22 on third-and-13, Garoppolo desperately tried to get out of the clutches of Rams defensive tackle Aaron Donald, but his last ditch pass attempt bounced off the hands of San Francisco running back JaMycal Hasty and was intercepted by linebacker Travin Howard to preserve the Rams' victory. Cooper Kupp, the NFL's leading receiver during the regular season, had 11 catches for 142 yards and two touchdowns, while Odell Beckham Jr. had season highs in both receptions (nine) and yards (113). Free safety Eric Weddle, who had come out of retirement to join L.A.'s postseason run, led the Rams with nine tackles. The defeated 49ers lost a conference championship game for the 10th time in team history, the most losses of any team since the AFL-NFL merger.

==== Super Bowl LVI: vs. (A4) Cincinnati Bengals ====
Super Bowl LVI: (N4) Los Angeles Rams vs. (A4) Cincinnati Bengals – Game summary

| Quarter | 1 | 2 | 3 | 4 | Total |
|---|---|---|---|---|---|
| Rams | 7 | 6 | 3 | 7 | 23 |
| Bengals | 3 | 7 | 10 | 0 | 20 |

at SoFi Stadium, Inglewood, California

- Date: February 13, 2022
- Game time: 3:40 p.m. PST
- Referee: Ronald Torbert
- TV announcers (NBC): Al Michaels, Cris Collinsworth, Michele Tafoya, and Kathryn Tappen
- Preview

Cooper Kupp's 1-yard touchdown reception with 1:25 remaining capped off a dramatic 15-play, 79-yard drive that gave the Rams a late lead, and back-to-back big plays by defensive tackle Aaron Donald at midfield clinched the franchise's first Super Bowl championship since 1999 in front of an overflow crowd at SoFi Stadium. The Rams' second Super Bowl victory (and fifth Super Bowl appearance overall) was also the first one won while the franchise was in Los Angeles, having lost in two previous attempts at the end of the 1979 and 2018 seasons. Kupp, who finished with eight receptions for 92 yards and two touchdowns, was named Super Bowl MVP. Quarterback Matthew Stafford threw for three touchdowns on the day, finishing with 283 passing yards. His first scoring strike went to Odell Beckham Jr. for 17 yards midway through the first quarter to finish a drive that went 50 yards in six plays after the Rams defense had stopped the Bengals on fourth down at midfield. After Cincinnati got on the scoreboard with a field goal, Beckham's 35-yard catch and run on a 3rd-and-11 play early in the second period helped to set up Stafford's second TD pass of the day, going 11 yards to Kupp to put the Rams ahead 13–3 (a mishandled snap botched the extra point attempt). However, on L.A.'s next possession, Beckham went down with a non-contact knee injury as he tried to make a reception and was lost for the remainder of the game. Leading 13–10 to end the second period, the Rams had a disastrous start to the third quarter. Cornerback Jalen Ramsey fell down after making contact with Bengals wide receiver Tee Higgins, who caught a 75-yard touchdown pass from quarterback Joe Burrow. Then on L.A.'s first offensive play of the second half, a Stafford pass bounced off the hands of backup wide receiver Ben Skowronek and was intercepted, giving Cincinnati possession at the Rams 31. Donald came up with two sacks to slow the Bengals offense and force them to settle for a second field goal by rookie kicker Evan McPherson and a 20–13 lead. Los Angeles answered with a 41-yard field goal by Matt Gay to close to within 20–16 as the game descended into a defensive slugfest. The Rams defense combined for seven total sacks, with linebacker Von Miller collecting two sacks of his own. The teams traded punts on the next seven possessions before the Rams began their final offensive drive with 6:13 remaining in the game. Facing a 4th-and-1 at their own 30, Stafford handed off to Kupp on a jet sweep, and Kupp cut inside off a block by tight end Brycen Hopkins for a crucial 7-yard gain. After moving methodically across midfield, the Rams faced 2nd-and-7 from the Bengal 46. Stafford took the snap and looked right but threw over the middle to Kupp, who took the crossing route for a 22-yard gain. Kupp then added another catch for eight yards and running back Cam Akers' 8-yard run took the Rams down inside the 10 just before the two-minute warning. Stafford failed to connect on three straight passes, but a pair of penalties on Cincinnati helped to keep the drive alive and the Rams found themselves with a first-and-goal at the Bengals 1 with 1:35 remaining. After Stafford was stopped for no gain on first down, he then connected again with Kupp on an outside hook route for a 23–20 lead. The Rams defense then had to shake off two big plays as Burrow made consecutive throws to wide receivers Ja'Marr Chase (17 yards) and Tyler Boyd (9 yards) to put the Bengals just inside Rams territory. But following an incomplete pass on second down, Donald fought off Bengals guard Hakeem Adeniji with his right arm and reached around with his left to stop running back Samaje Perine for no gain to set up a 4th-and-1 play. With Burrow in the shotgun, Donald came barreling through the offensive line and corralled Burrow as he threw a desperation toss that landed harmlessly on the turf, securing the Rams' victory. In receiving the Vince Lombardi Trophy, Rams owner Stan Kroenke paid tribute to his team and coaching staff, including Sean McVay, who (at age 36) became the youngest coach ever to win a Super Bowl. Additionally, the Rams were the second team in as many seasons to play (and win) the Super Bowl in their home stadium after the Buccaneers in Super Bowl LV. The AFC champion Cincinnati Bengals were the designated home team and chose to wear their black jerseys with white pants. The Rams opted to wear their white throwback jerseys with yellow pants, a uniform combination that was introduced earlier in the season.

== Statistics ==
=== Team ===
| Category | Total yards | Yards per game | NFL rank (out of 32) |
|---|---|---|---|
| Passing offense | 4,642 | 273.1 | 5th |
| Rushing offense | 1,683 | 99.0 | 25th |
| Total offense | 6,325 | 372.1 | 9th |
| Passing defense | 4,109 | 241.7 | 22nd |
| Rushing defense | 1,754 | 103.2 | 6th |
| Total defense | 5,863 | 344.9 | 17th |

=== Individual ===
| Category | Player | Total yards |
Offense
| Passing | Matthew Stafford | 4,886 |
| Rushing | Sony Michel | 845 |
| Receiving | Cooper Kupp | 1,947 |
Defense
| Tackles (Solo) | Taylor Rapp | 64 |
| Sacks | Aaron Donald | 12.5 |
| Interceptions | Jalen Ramsey; Taylor Rapp | 4 |

Statistics correct as of the end of the 2021 NFL season

== Awards and honors ==
| Recipient | Award(s) |
|---|---|
| Aaron Donald | Week 14: NFC Defensive Player of the Week; December: NFC Defensive Player of the Month |
| Cooper Kupp | September: NFC Offensive Player of the Month; October: NFC Offensive Player of the Month; AP Offensive Player of the Year |
| Brandon Powell | Week 16: NFC Special Teams Player of the Week |
| Taylor Rapp | Week 6: NFC Defensive Player of the Week |
| Matthew Stafford | Week 1: NFC Offensive Player of the Week; Week 3: NFC Offensive Player of the Week |
| Andrew Whitworth | Walter Payton NFL Man of the Year |
