= Troy Reeder =

American football player (born 1994)

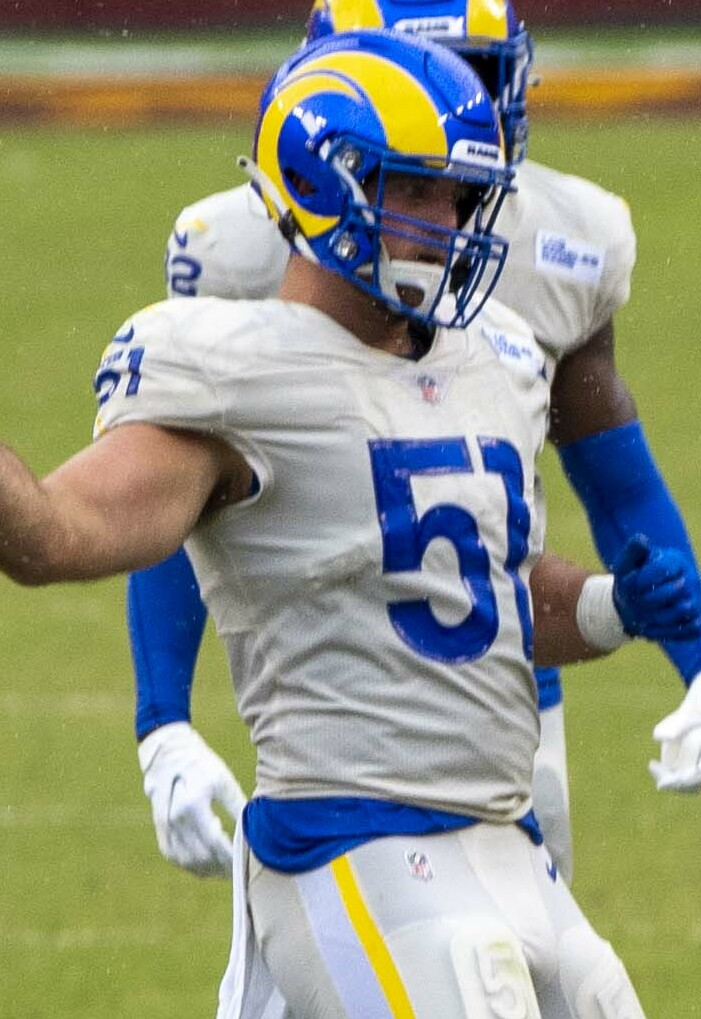
- Reeder with the Los Angeles Rams in 2020

No. 50 – New York Jets
- Position: Linebacker
- Roster status: Active

Personal information
- Born: September 13, 1994 (age 32); Wilmington, Delaware, U.S.
- Listed height: 6 ft 3 in (1.91 m)
- Listed weight: 234 lb (106 kg)

Career information
- High school: Salesianum School (Wilmington)
- College: Penn State (2014–2015); Delaware (2016–2018)
- NFL draft: 2019: undrafted

Career history
- Los Angeles Rams (2019–2021); Los Angeles Chargers (2022); Minnesota Vikings (2023)*; Los Angeles Rams (2023–2025); Detroit Lions (2026)*; New York Jets (2026–present)
- * Offseason or practice squad member only

Awards and highlights
- Super Bowl champion (LVI); First-team All-CAA (2017, 2018); Second-team All-CAA (2016)

Career NFL statistics as of Week 5, 2026
- Total tackles: 339
- Sacks: 5.0
- Forced fumbles: 3
- Pass deflections: 12
- Interceptions: 2
- Stats at Pro Football Reference

Troy Daniel Reeder (born September 13, 1994) is an American professional football linebacker for the New York Jets of the National Football League (NFL). He played college football for the Penn State Nittany Lions and Delaware Fightin' Blue Hens. He was signed as an undrafted free agent by the Los Angeles Rams following the 2019 NFL draft. Reeder has also played for the Los Angeles Chargers.

== Early life ==
Reeder grew up in Hockessin, Delaware, and attended Salesianum School, where he played football and lacrosse. In football, Reeder was named first team All-State (second straight season) at linebacker and the Delaware Defensive Player of the Year after making 96 tackles (60 solo) with 3.5 sacks, two forced fumbles and three fumbles recovered and first team All-State at running back after rushing for 1,154 yards and 18 touchdowns as the Sallies won the DIAA state championship. In lacrosse, Reeder was a three-time first team All-State selection and three time state champion. He originally committed to play the sport collegiately at North Carolina, but de-committed during his senior year as interest from football programs increased. Rated a four-star prospect by ESPN.com and a three-star recruit by Rivals, Scout, and 247Sports, Reeder committed to play college football at Penn State over offers from Miami, Vanderbilt, Virginia, Boston College, Rutgers, and Delaware.

== College career ==
Reeder began his college career at Penn State, redshirting his freshman year. He became the starting middle linebacker for the Nittany Lions the following season after Nyeem Wartman-White suffered a season-ending injury in the season opener against Temple. He finished the season with 67 tackles (fourth-most on the team), including 5.5 for loss, and an interception in 12 games played (11 starts) and was named to the Big Ten Conference All-Freshman team. Shortly after the end of the season, Reeder announced he would be transferring to the University of Delaware.

Reeder immediately entered the Blue Hens starting lineup at outside linebacker and was named second team All-Colonial Athletic Association (CAA) after recording 63 tackles (4.5 for loss), one sack, two forced fumbles and one fumble recovery along with two interceptions, one of which he returned for a touchdown in his Delaware debut against Delaware State, and a blocked kick. He was named first team All-CAA as a redshirt junior after leading the team with 89 tackles (seven for loss), an interception, three pass breakups, a forced fumble, a fumble recovery and a blocked kick. In his final collegiate season, Reeder led the CAA with 131 tackles and 13.5 tackles for loss and was again named first team all-conference.

== Professional career ==
Pre-draft measurables
Height	Weight	Arm length	Hand span	Wingspan	40-yard dash	10-yard split	20-yard split	20-yard shuttle	Three-cone drill	Vertical jump	Broad jump	Bench press
6 ft 1 in (1.85 m)	235 lb (107 kg)	29 7/8 in (0.76 m)	9 3/8 in (0.24 m)	6 ft 2 3/8 in (1.89 m)	4.63 s	1.63 s	2.70 s	4.14 s	7.00 s	37.5 in (0.95 m)	10 ft 2 in (3.10 m)	27 reps
All values from Pro Day

=== Los Angeles Rams (first stint) ===
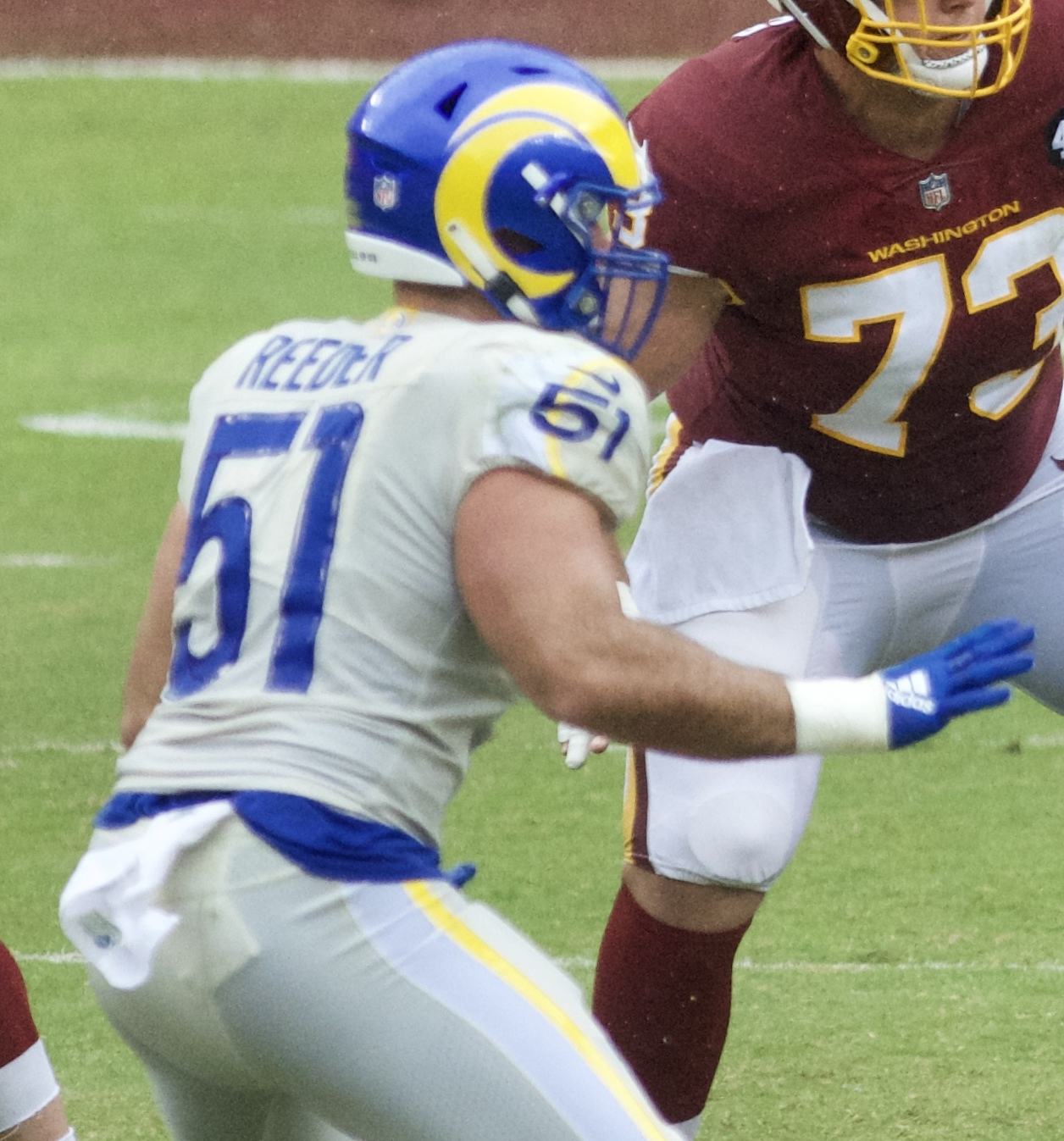
Reeder in 2020

Reeder signed with the Los Angeles Rams as an undrafted free agent on April 27, 2019, and made the team out of training camp. He made his NFL debut in the Rams season opener against the Carolina Panthers on September 8, making his first career tackle, on special teams. Reeder made his first career start on October 3, against the Seattle Seahawks, replacing injured starter Bryce Hager and making a game-high 13 tackles. He started eight of the Rams' last 12 games and finished his rookie season with 58 tackles and two forced fumbles.

In Week 5 of the 2020 season against the Washington Football Team, Reeder recorded 11 tackles and the first three sacks of his NFL career during the 30–10 win. He played in all 16 of the Rams' games with seven starts and finished the 2020 season as the team's second-leading tackler with 81 total tackles with five tackles for loss and three sacks.

Reeder helped the Rams reach Super Bowl LVI in the 2021 NFL season. Reeder recorded two tackles in the team's Super Bowl victory against the Cincinnati Bengals. This win earned Reeder his first career Super Bowl ring.

=== Los Angeles Chargers ===
On April 12, 2022, Reeder signed with the Los Angeles Chargers.

=== Minnesota Vikings ===
On March 22, 2023, Reeder signed with the Minnesota Vikings. He was waived by the Vikings on August 29.

=== Los Angeles Rams (second stint) ===
On August 31, 2023, Reeder was signed to the Los Angeles Rams' practice squad. He was promoted to the active roster on September 9. He played in all 17 regular season games for the Rams and made six starts with 23 total tackles (11 unassisted).

Reeder began the 2024 season as the Rams' starting inside linebacker and started in the team's first six games. He had a season-high 10 tackles in the Rams' 27-24 victory over the San Francisco 49ers in Week 3, then had nine tackles in L.A.'s 20-15 win against the Las Vegas Raiders. However, a hamstring injury suffered against the Raiders caused Reeder to be placed on injured reserve, and he missed the remainder of the season as a result.

On April 10, 2025, Reeder re-signed with the Rams on a one-year, $1.17 million contract. He played in all 17 regular season games, making one start in Week 6 when he recorded three tackles and a pass deflection in the Rams' 17-3 win on the road against the Baltimore Ravens. In the team's Wild Card round matchup against the Carolina Panthers, Reeder recovered a Trevor Etienne muffed punt, helping fuel the team to a 34-31 victory. He contributed in all three playoff games for L.A., which ended its season in the NFC Championship Game.

=== Detroit Lions ===
On July 27, 2026, Reeder signed with the Detroit Lions. On August 30, he was released by the Lions as a part of final roster cuts.

=== New York Jets ===
On August 31, 2026, Reeder was signed to the New York Jets' practice squad. On September 22, he was signed to the team's active roster. On October 13, Reeder was released and re-signed to the practice squad the next day. He was signed back to the active roster on November 9.

== NFL career statistics ==
Legend
	Won the Super Bowl
**Bold**	Career high

=== Regular season ===
Year	Team	Games		Tackles					Interceptions						Fumbles				
Year	Team	GP	GS	Cmb	Solo	Ast	Sck	TFL	Int	Yds	Avg	Lng	TD	PD	FF	Fum	FR	Yds	TD
2019	LAR	16	8	58	36	22	0.0	0	0	0	0.0	0	0	0	**2**	0	0	0	0
2020	LAR	16	7	81	**53**	28	**3.0**	5	0	0	0.0	0	0	2	0	0	0	0	0
2021	LAR	**17**	**10**	**91**	48	**43**	2.0	**6**	**2**	**2**	**1.0**	**2**	0	**6**	0	0	0	0	0
2022	LAC	17	0	11	6	5	0.0	0	0	0	0.0	0	0	1	1	0	0	0	0
2023	LAR	17	6	23	11	12	0.0	0	0	0	0.0	0	0	0	0	0	0	0	0
2024	LAR	6	6	46	26	20	0.0	1	0	0	0.0	0	0	1	0	0	0	0	0
2025	LAR	17	1	25	17	8	0.0	0	0	0	0.0	0	0	2	0	0	0	0	0
2026	NYJ	4	0	4	1	3	0.0	0	0	0	0.0	0	0	0	0	0	0	0	0
Career		110	38	339	198	141	5.0	12	2	2	1.0	2	0	12	3	0	0	0	0

=== Postseason ===
Year	Team	Games		Tackles					Interceptions						Fumbles				
Year	Team	GP	GS	Cmb	Solo	Ast	Sck	TFL	Int	Yds	Avg	Lng	TD	PD	FF	Fum	FR	Yds	TD
2020	LAR	2	2	**20**	6	**14**	0.0	0	0	0	0.0	0	0	**1**	0	0	0	0	0
2021	LAR	**4**	**3**	16	**9**	7	0.0	0	0	0	0.0	0	0	**1**	0	0	0	0	0
2022	LAC	1	0	1	1	0	0.0	0	0	0	0.0	0	0	0	0	0	0	0	0
2025	LAR	3	0	2	1	1	0.0	0	0	0	0.0	0	0	0	0	0	**1**	0	0
Career		10	5	39	17	22	0.0	0	0	0	0.0	0	0	2	0	0	1	0	0

== Personal life ==
Reeder is the son of former Delaware and Pittsburgh Steelers running back Dan Reeder. His mother Cheryl played basketball at Elizabethtown College and was a member of the 1982 team that won the Division III national championship. His younger brother Colby was also a standout two-way player at Salesianum and played linebacker at Iowa State University after transferring from Delaware. Colby's commitment to play football at Delaware was a factor in Troy's decision to transfer there from Penn State.
