= 2020 Los Angeles Rams season =

84th season in franchise history

- Owner: Stan Kroenke
- General manager: Les Snead
- Head coach: Sean McVay
- Offensive coordinator: Kevin O'Connell
- Defensive coordinator: Brandon Staley
- Home stadium: SoFi Stadium

Results
- Record: 10–6
- Division place: 2nd NFC West
- Playoffs: Won Wild Card Playoffs (at Seahawks) 30–20; Lost Divisional Playoffs (at Packers) 18–32
- All-Pros: DT Aaron Donald (1st team); CB Jalen Ramsey (1st team)
- Pro Bowlers: DT Aaron Donald; CB Jalen Ramsey

Uniform
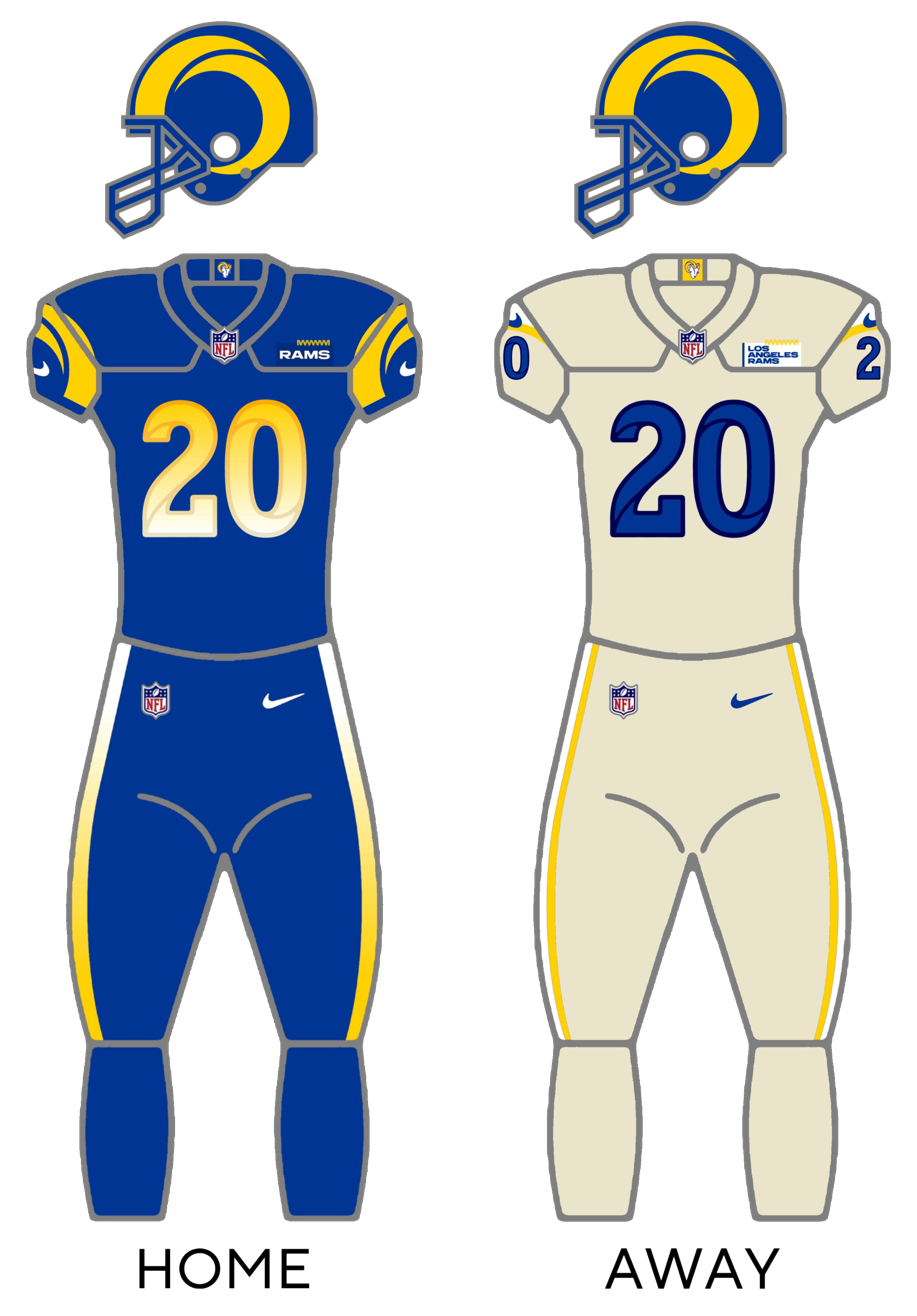

The 2020 season was the Los Angeles Rams' 83rd season in the National Football League (NFL), their 84th overall, their 54th in the Greater Los Angeles Area, and their fourth under head coach Sean McVay. It also marked the team's first season playing their home games at SoFi Stadium in Inglewood, which the team shares with the Los Angeles Chargers. This was the first season in which the Rams would share the same venue as the Chargers since 1960. Due to public health restrictions put in place due to the coronavirus pandemic, all home games (and most road games) were played without fans in attendance. The Rams improved on their 9–7 season from the previous year after a Week 17 victory over the Arizona Cardinals, returning to the playoffs after missing out the previous season.

The Rams' strong defense was a key reason to their success; the team finished at the top of the league in most defensive statistics, such as total defense (281.9 yards per game), passing defense (190.7 yards per game), scoring defense (18.5 points per game), and also fared well in others, ranking third in run defense (91.3 yards per game), second in sacks (53), and 10th in takeaways (22, with 14 interceptions and 8 fumble recoveries).

In the Wild Card round, the Rams upset the rival Seattle Seahawks 30–20, advancing to the Divisional round, but lost to the top-seeded Green Bay Packers by a score of 32–18.

== Offseason ==
=== Coaching changes ===
- On January 6, 2020, the Rams parted ways with long time defensive coordinator Wade Phillips, whose contract was not renewed. Special teams coordinator John Fassel, who had been with the franchise since 2012, was also not retained and took the same position with the Dallas Cowboys. Other staff members who did not return were assistant offensive coordinator Jedd Fisch, running backs coach Skip Peete, assistant special teams coach Matt Daniels, and director of strength training and performance Ted Rath.
- Several staff members shifted responsibilities or added to their duties. Run game coordinator Aaron Kromer also became the team's offensive line coach, while pass game coordinator Shane Waldron retained that title but is no longer the quarterbacks coach. Also, assistant wide receivers coach Zac Robinson and assistant quarterbacks coach Liam Coen swapped positions from the previous season.
- Kevin O'Connell was hired as offensive coordinator and Brandon Staley took over as defensive coordinator. John Bonamego was brought on board as special teams coordinator and was assisted by Tory Woodbury. Justin Lovett became the Rams' new director of strength training and performance.

=== Uniform changes ===
- In March 2019, the Rams announced they would debut new uniforms for the 2020 season. The new logos and colors were revealed on March 23. The new primary logo was derided by fans as well as former Rams players. The new uniforms were revealed on May 13 and were also heavily criticized by fans.

== Roster changes ==
=== Free agency ===
==== Unrestricted ====
Position	Player	2020 team	Date signed	Contract
DE	Michael Brockers	Los Angeles Rams	March 27, 2020	
ILB	Cory Littleton	Las Vegas Raiders	March 25, 2020	
OLB	Dante Fowler	Atlanta Falcons	March 25, 2020	
WR	Mike Thomas	Cincinnati Bengals	March 24, 2020	
C	Austin Blythe	Los Angeles Rams	March 26, 2020	
QB	Blake Bortles	Denver Broncos	September 24, 2020	
K	Greg Zuerlein	Dallas Cowboys	March 30, 2020	
CB	Nickell Robey-Coleman	Philadelphia Eagles	March 31, 2020	
FS	Marqui Christian	New York Jets	September 23, 2020	
LB	Bryce Hager	New York Jets	September 22, 2020	
T	Andrew Whitworth	Los Angeles Rams	March 18, 2020	

=== Releases/waivers ===
On March 19, 2020, the Rams released running back Todd Gurley after they were unable to trade him. The move was made before the team would have to pay an additional $10.5 million on Gurley's $60 million contract extension that was signed prior to the 2018 season. Gurley was later signed as a free agent by the Atlanta Falcons.

Also on March 19, 2020, the Rams released linebacker Clay Matthews after one season.

=== Retirements ===
On February 6, 2020, veteran safety Eric Weddle announced his retirement from the NFL after 13 seasons.

=== Draft ===
2020 Los Angeles Rams draft
Round	Selection	Player	Position	College	Notes
2	52	Cam Akers	RB	Florida State	
2	57	Van Jefferson	WR	Florida	from Houston
3	84	Terrell Lewis	OLB	Alabama	
3	104	Terrell Burgess	S	Utah	Compensatory pick
4	136	Brycen Hopkins	TE	Purdue	from Houston
6	199	Jordan Fuller	S	Ohio State	
7	234	Clay Johnston	LB	Baylor	
7	248	Sam Sloman	K	Miami (OH)	from Houston
7	250	Tremayne Anchrum	G	Clemson	from Houston

Draft trades

- The Rams traded their first-round selection (20th overall), as well as their first-round and fourth-round selections in the 2021 NFL draft to the Jacksonville Jaguars in exchange for cornerback Jalen Ramsey.
- The Rams traded their fifth-round selection (165th overall), as well as a 2019 third-round selection to the Jacksonville Jaguars in exchange for linebacker Dante Fowler.
- The Rams traded cornerback Marcus Peters to the Baltimore Ravens in exchange for linebacker Kenny Young and a fifth-round selection. The Rams later traded this selection as well as cornerback Aqib Talib to the Miami Dolphins in exchange for a seventh-round selection in the 2022 NFL draft.
- The Rams traded wide receiver Brandin Cooks and their fourth-round selection in 2022 to the Houston Texans in exchange for the Texans' second-round pick (57th overall).
- The Rams traded their fourth round pick (126th overall) to the Houston Texans in exchange for the Texans' fourth round pick (136th overall) and two seventh-round selections (Nos. 248 and 250).

=== Undrafted free agents ===
Following the 2020 NFL draft, the Rams signed 20 undrafted rookie free agents who would compete for roster spots and participate in the team's offseason and training camp programs.

Player	Position	College
Eric Banks	DE	UTSA
Cohl Cabral	C	Arizona State
Earnest Edwards	WR	Maine
James Gilbert	RB	Kansas State
Mike Hoecht	DE	Brown
JuJu Hughes	S	Fresno State
Trishton Jackson	WR	Syracuse
Xavier Jones	RB	SMU
J. J. Koski	WR	Cal Poly
Dayan Lake	CB	BYU
Josh Love	QB	San Jose State
Tyrique McGhee	CB	Georgia
Bryce Perkins	QB	Virginia
Brandon Polk	WR	James Madison
Greg Reaves	ILB	USF
Sam Reener	OLB	Minnesota
Christian Rozeboom	ILB	South Dakota State
Levonta Taylor	CB	Florida State
Jonah Williams	DE	Weber State
Easop Winston	WR	Washington State

== Staff ==
2020 Los Angeles Rams staff
Front office: Chairman/CEO – Stan Kroenke; COO/Executive vice president of football operations– Kevin Demoff; General manager – Les Snead; Senior personnel executive – Brian Xanders; Senior personnel advisor – Taylor Morton; Director of college scouting – Brad Holmes; Director of scouting strategy – James Gladstone; Director of pro personnel – Ray Agnew; Assistant director of college scouting – Ted Monago; Director of draft management – J. W. Jordan; Director of player engagement - Jacques McClendon; Head coaches: Head coach – Sean McVay; Assistant head coach/linebackers – Joe Barry; Assistant to the head coach – Bill Nayes; Offensive coaches: Offensive coordinator – Kevin O'Connell; Pass game coordinator – Shane Waldron; Assistant quarterbacks – Liam Coen; Running backs – Thomas Brown; Wide receivers – Eric Yarber; Assistant wide receivers – Zac Robinson; Tight ends – Wes Phillips; Run game coordinator/offensive line – Aaron Kromer; Assistant offensive line – Andy Dickerson; Offensive quality control – Zak Kromer	Defensive coaches: Defensive coordinator – Brandon Staley; Defensive line – Eric Henderson; Assistant defensive line – Thad Bogardus; Outside linebackers – Chris Shula; Cornerbacks – Aubrey Pleasant; Safeties – Ejiro Evero; Defensive quality control – Jonathan Cooley; Special teams coaches: Special teams coordinator – John Bonamego; Assistant special teams - Tory Woodbury; Strength and conditioning: Head strength and conditioning – Justin Lovett; Assistant strength and conditioning – Fernando Noriega; Assistant strength and conditioning – Dustin Woods

== Final roster ==
2020 Los Angeles Rams roster
Quarterbacks (QB): 19 Blake Bortles; 16 Jared Goff; 9 John Wolford; Running backs (RB): 23 Cam Akers; 34 Malcolm Brown; 35 Xavier Jones; Wide receivers (WR): 83 Trishton Jackson; 12 Van Jefferson; 10 Cooper Kupp; 11 Josh Reynolds; 14 Nsimba Webster; 17 Robert Woods; Tight ends (TE): 81 Gerald Everett; 89 Tyler Higbee; 88 Brycen Hopkins; 82 Johnny Mundt	Offensive linemen (OL): 55 Brian Allen C; 72 Tremayne Anchrum G; 66 Austin Blythe C; 63 Austin Corbett G; 73 David Edwards G; 71 Bobby Evans T; 79 Rob Havenstein T; 70 Joseph Noteboom T; 65 Coleman Shelton C; 77 Andrew Whitworth T; Defensive linemen (DL): 90 Michael Brockers DE; 99 Aaron Donald DT; 97 Morgan Fox DE; 91 Greg Gaines NT; 69 Sebastian Joseph-Day NT; 94 A'Shawn Robinson DE	Linebackers (LB): 50 Samson Ebukam OLB; 54 Leonard Floyd OLB; 58 Justin Hollins ILB; 59 Micah Kiser ILB; 52 Terrell Lewis OLB; 45 Ogbonnia Okoronkwo OLB; 51 Troy Reeder ILB; 49 Derek Rivers OLB; 41 Kenny Young ILB; Defensive backs (DB): 32 Jordan Fuller FS; 22 Troy Hill CB; 46 JuJu Hughes FS; 43 John Johnson FS; 25 David Long CB; 20 Jalen Ramsey CB; 36 J. R. Reed FS; 33 Nick Scott FS; 31 Darious Williams CB; Special teams (ST): 1 Matt Gay K; 6 Johnny Hekker P; 44 Jake McQuaide LS	Practice squad: 98 Eric Banks DT; 86 Kendall Blanton TE; 93 Marquise Copeland DT; 21 Donte Deayon CB; 64 Jamil Demby G; 39 Jake Gervase S; 96 Michael Hoecht DE; -- Colin Holba LS; 15 J. J. Koski WR; 8 Austin MacGinnis K; 37 Tyrique McGhee CB (Susp.); 47 Derrick Moncrief ILB; 5 Bryce Perkins QB; 56 Christian Rozeboom ILB; 62 Jonah Williams DE; 4 Brandon Wright K/P; Reserve: 67 Chandler Brewer G (Opt-out); 26 Terrell Burgess SS (IR); 30 Raymond Calais RB (IR); 27 Darrell Henderson RB (IR); 48 Travin Howard ILB (IR); 53 Justin Lawler OLB (IR); 24 Taylor Rapp SS (IR); Rookies in italics 53 active, 7 reserve, 15 practice squad (1 exempt)

== Preseason ==
The Rams' preseason schedule was announced on May 7, but was later cancelled due to the Coronavirus Pandemic.

Week	Date	Opponent	Venue	Result
1	August 14	New Orleans Saints	SoFi Stadium	Cancelled due to the Coronavirus pandemic
2	August 22	at Los Angeles Chargers	SoFi Stadium	Cancelled due to the Coronavirus pandemic
3	August 29	Denver Broncos	SoFi Stadium	Cancelled due to the Coronavirus pandemic
4	September 3	at Las Vegas Raiders	Allegiant Stadium	Cancelled due to the Coronavirus pandemic

== Regular season ==
=== Schedule ===
The Rams' 2020 schedule was announced on May 7.

Week	Date	Opponent	Result	Record	Venue	Recap
1	September 13	Dallas Cowboys	**W** 20–17	1–0	SoFi Stadium	Recap
2	September 20	at Philadelphia Eagles	**W** 37–19	2–0	Lincoln Financial Field	Recap
3	September 27	at Buffalo Bills	**L** 32–35	2–1	Bills Stadium	Recap
4	October 4	New York Giants	**W** 17–9	3–1	SoFi Stadium	Recap
5	October 11	at Washington Football Team	**W** 30–10	4–1	FedExField	Recap
6	October 18	at **San Francisco 49ers**	**L** 16–24	4–2	Levi's Stadium	Recap
7	October 26	Chicago Bears	**W** 24–10	5–2	SoFi Stadium	Recap
8	November 1	at Miami Dolphins	**L** 17–28	5–3	Hard Rock Stadium	Recap
9	Bye					
10	November 15	**Seattle Seahawks**	**W** 23–16	6–3	SoFi Stadium	Recap
11	November 23	at Tampa Bay Buccaneers	**W** 27–24	7–3	Raymond James Stadium	Recap
12	November 29	**San Francisco 49ers**	**L** 20–23	7–4	SoFi Stadium	Recap
13	December 6	at **Arizona Cardinals**	**W** 38–28	8–4	State Farm Stadium	Recap
14	December 10	New England Patriots	**W** 24–3	9–4	SoFi Stadium	Recap
15	December 20	New York Jets	**L** 20–23	9–5	SoFi Stadium	Recap
16	December 27	at **Seattle Seahawks**	**L** 9–20	9–6	Lumen Field	Recap
17	January 3	**Arizona Cardinals**	**W** 18–7	10–6	SoFi Stadium	Recap

Note: Intra-division opponents are in bold text.

=== Game summaries ===
==== Week 1: vs. Dallas Cowboys ====
Week One: Dallas Cowboys at Los Angeles Rams – Game summary

Quarter	1	2	3	4	Total
Cowboys	0	14	3	0	**17**
**Rams**	7	6	7	0	**20**

at SoFi Stadium, Inglewood, California

- Date: September 13
- Game time: 5:20 p.m. PDT
- Game weather: Cloudy, 72 °F (22 °C)
- Game attendance: 0
- Referee: Tony Corrente
- TV announcers (NBC): Al Michaels, Cris Collinsworth, Michele Tafoya and Terry McAulay
- Recap, Game Book

Game information

**First quarter**

- LAR – Malcolm Brown 1-yard run (Sam Sloman kick), 11:37. Rams 7–0. **Drive: 7 plays, 75 yards, 3:23.**

**Second quarter**

- DAL – Ezekiel Elliott 19-yard pass from Dak Prescott (Greg Zuerlein kick), 12:24. Tied 7–7. **Drive: 8 plays, 80 yards, 2:38.**
- LAR – Sam Sloman 35-yard field goal, 8:42. Rams 10-7. **Drive: 11 plays, 58 yards, 3:42.**
- LAR – Sam Sloman 31-yard field goal, 1:56. Rams 13–7. **Drive: 7 plays, 44 yards, 3:16.**
- DAL – Ezekiel Elliott 1-yard run (Greg Zuerlein kick), 0:17. Cowboys 14-13. **Drive: 9 plays, 73 yards, 1:39.**

**Third quarter**

- LAR – Malcolm Brown 2-yard run (Sam Sloman kick), 5:33. Rams 20–14. **Drive: 11 plays, 85 yards, 5:51.**
- DAL – Greg Zuerlein 33-yard field goal, 1:50. Rams 20–17. **Drive: 6 plays, 24 yards, 1:53.**

**Fourth quarter**

- No scoring plays.

**Top passers**

- DAL – Dak Prescott – 25/39, 266 yards, TD
- LAR – Jared Goff – 20/31, 275 yards, INT

**Top rushers**

- DAL – Ezekiel Elliott – 22 rushes, 96 yards, TD
- LAR – Malcolm Brown – 18 rushes, 79 yards, 2 TD

**Top receivers**

- DAL – Michael Gallup – 10 receptions, 81 yards
- LAR – Robert Woods – 6 receptions, 105 yards

Playing their first game ever in their brand-new home at SoFi Stadium, the Rams held off the Cowboys in a close battle of NFC contenders on Sunday Night Football. Receiving the opening kickoff (from former Rams kicker Greg Zuerlein), Los Angeles drove 75 yards in seven plays, with Malcolm Brown scoring the new stadium's first touchdown on a 1-yard run. Rookie kicker Samuel Sloman missed on his first field goal attempt, a 29-yard try that bounced off the left upright near the end of the first quarter, but later was successful on field goals of 35 and 31 yards in the second quarter. However, Dallas took a 14–13 halftime lead as Cowboys running back Ezekiel Elliott scored on both a touchdown run and a touchdown reception. The Rams reclaimed the lead as Malcolm Brown (who finished with a team-high 18 rushes for 79 yards) scored his second touchdown of the game on a 2-yard run midway through the third quarter to put Los Angeles ahead 20–14. Zuerlein converted a 33-yard field goal late in the third quarter, but it would be as close as the Cowboys would get. Rookie safety Jordan Fuller led the Rams with eight total tackles, including a key tackle of Cowboys wide receiver CeeDee Lamb on a fourth-and-3 play at the Rams' 9-yard line, just one yard short of a first down to kill a Dallas scoring drive. Wide receiver Robert Woods led Los Angeles with six receptions for 105 yards. Following the game, head coach Sean McVay presented a game ball to team owner Stan Kroenke.

==== Week 2: at Philadelphia Eagles ====
Week Two: Los Angeles Rams at Philadelphia Eagles – Game summary

Quarter	1	2	3	4	Total
**Rams**	14	7	3	13	**37**
Eagles	3	13	0	3	**19**

at Lincoln Financial Field, Philadelphia, Pennsylvania

- Date: September 20
- Game time: 1:00 p.m. EDT/10:00 am. PDT
- Game weather: Sunny, 62 °F (17 °C)
- Game attendance: 0
- Referee: Brad Allen
- TV announcers (Fox): Kevin Kugler, Chris Spielman and Laura Okmin
- Recap, Game Book

Game information

**First quarter**

- LAR – Tyler Higbee 4-yard pass from Jared Goff (Sam Sloman kick), 11:15. Rams 7–0. **Drive: 5 plays, 41 yards, 2:22.**
- PHI – Jake Elliott 38-yard field goal, 6:42. Rams 7–3. **Drive: 9 plays, 50 yards, 4:33.**
- LAR – Robert Woods 5-yard run (Sam Sloman kick), 1:48. Rams 14–3. **Drive: 10 plays, 75 yards, 4:54.**

**Second quarter**

- LAR – Tyler Higbee 3-yard pass from Jared Goff (Sam Sloman kick), 12:15. Rams 21–3. **Drive: 8 plays, 80 yards, 3:32.**
- PHI – Carson Wentz 1-yard run (run failed), 6:10. Rams 21–9. **Drive: 11 plays, 75 yards, 6:05.**
- PHI – Miles Sanders 5-yard run (Jake Elliott kick), 0:35. Rams 21–16. **Drive: 2 plays, 11 yards, 0:11.**

**Third quarter**

- LAR – Sam Sloman 30-yard field goal, 2:14. Rams 24–16. **Drive: 16 plays, 68 yards, 5:49.**

**Fourth quarter**

- PHI – Jake Elliott 33-yard field goal, 12:07. Rams 24–19. **Drive: 13 plays, 60 yards, 5:07.**
- LAR – Tyler Higbee 28-yard pass from Jared Goff (Sam Sloman kick), 10:53. Rams 31–19. **Drive: 3 plays, 75 yards, 1:14.**
- LAR – Darrell Henderson 2-yard run (kick blocked), 3:37. Rams 37–19. **Drive: 9 plays, 64 yards, 4:11.**

**Top passers**

- LAR – Jared Goff – 20/27, 267 yards, 3 TD
- PHI – Carson Wentz – 26/43, 242 yards, 2 INT

**Top rushers**

- LAR – Darrell Henderson – 12 rushes, 81 yards, TD
- PHI – Miles Sanders – 20 rushes, 95 yards, TD

**Top receivers**

- LAR – Cooper Kupp – 5 receptions, 81 yards
- PHI – DeSean Jackson – 6 receptions, 64 yards

Linebacker Micah Kiser had a breakout performance that earned him NFC Defensive Player of the Week honors and tight end Tyler Higbee caught three touchdowns as the Rams broke a six-game losing streak to the Eagles (dating back to 2004) and gave head coach Sean McVay his first victory over Philadelphia after two prior defeats. With the win, the Rams earned their third consecutive 2–0 start. Making his second career start at inside linebacker after missing all of 2019, Kiser forced a fumble on the Eagles' opening drive. Linebacker Kenny Young recovered the fumble by Eagles running back Miles Sanders to give Los Angeles possession at the Philadelphia 41. Three runs for 13 yards by rookie running back Cam Akers and a 24-yard pass from quarterback Jared Goff to wide receiver Cooper Kupp set up a 4-yard scoring toss from Goff to Higbee with 11:15 remaining in the first quarter. Goff, who completed his first 14 passes, led the Rams to scores on their next two drives, the first ending with a 5-yard run around end by Robert Woods and the second capped off by a second TD pass to Higbee from three yards out. After the Eagles bounced back with a pair of touchdowns in the second quarter, the Rams extended their lead as kicker Samuel Sloman added a 30-yard field goal in the third period. Then in the fourth, Goff and Higbee connected for a third touchdown, this one from 28 yards. Second-year running back Darryl Henderson led the Rams on the ground with 81 yards on 12 carries, including his first career NFL touchdown on a 2-yard run with 3:41 remaining in the game. Kiser led the Rams with 15 total tackles (10 solo) along with the forced fumble and a pass deflection. While Los Angeles did not sack Carson Wentz, constant pressure forced the Philadelphia quarterback to throw two interceptions to L.A. cornerbacks Darious Williams and Troy Hill as the Rams got their first-ever win at Lincoln Financial Field as well as their first road win over Philadelphia since the 2001 season.

==== Week 3: at Buffalo Bills ====
Week Three: Los Angeles Rams at Buffalo Bills – Game summary

Quarter	1	2	3	4	Total
Rams	0	3	14	15	**32**
**Bills**	7	14	7	7	**35**

at Bills Stadium, Orchard Park, New York

- Date: September 27
- Game time: 1:00 pm. EDT/10:00 am. PDT
- Game weather: Sunny, 79 °F (26 °C)
- Game attendance: 0
- Referee: Alex Kemp
- TV announcers (Fox): Chris Myers, Greg Jennings, Brock Huard and Jen Hale
- Recap, Game Book

Game information

**First quarter**

- BUF – Lee Smith 1-yard pass from Josh Allen (Tyler Bass kick), 1:41. Bills 7–0. **Drive: 11 plays, 57 yards, 6:26.**

**Second quarter**

- BUF – Josh Allen 1-yard run (Tyler Bass kick), 10:04. Bills 14–0. **Drive: 7 plays, 66 yards, 3:55.**
- LAR – Samuel Sloman 30-yard field goal, 3:09. Bills 14–3. **Drive: 13 plays, 63 yards, 6:55.**
- BUF – Tyler Kroft 3-yard pass from Josh Allen (Tyler Bass kick), 0:38. Bills 21–3. **Drive: 8 plays, 75 yards, 2:31.**

**Third quarter**

- BUF – Stefon Diggs 4-yard pass from Josh Allen (Tyler Bass kick), 8:05. Bills 28–3. **Drive: 7 plays, 52 yards, 4:16.**
- LAR – Jared Goff 1-yard run (Samuel Sloman kick), 4:47. Bills 28–10. **Drive: 8 plays, 75 yards, 3:18.**
- LAR – Robert Woods 25-yard pass from Jared Goff (Sam Sloman kick), 2:52. Bills 28-17. **Drive: 3 plays, 59 yards, 1:21.**

**Fourth quarter**

- LAR – Cooper Kupp 16-yard pass from Jared Goff (Jared Goff-Tyler Higbee pass), 10:34. Bills 28-25. **Drive: 10 plays, 97 yards, 5:43.**
- LAR – Darrell Henderson 1-yard run (Samuel Sloman kick), 4:30. Rams 32–28. **Drive: 6 plays, 37 yards, 2:55.**
- BUF – Tyler Kroft 3-yard pass from Josh Allen (Tyler Bass kick), 0:15. Bills 35-32. **Drive: 11 plays, 75 yards, 4:15.**

**Top passers**

- LAR – Jared Goff – 23/32, 321 yards, 2 TD, INT
- BUF – Josh Allen – 24/33, 311 yards, 4 TD, INT

**Top rushers**

- LAR – Darrell Henderson – 20 rushes, 114 yards, TD
- BUF – Devin Singletary – 13 rushes, 71 yards

**Top receivers**

- LAR – Cooper Kupp – 9 receptions, 107 yards, TD
- BUF – Cole Beasley – 6 receptions, 100 yards

After falling behind 28–3 in the third quarter, the Rams staged the largest comeback in team history, but ultimately fell to the host Bills in their first inter-conference game of 2020. Los Angeles had difficulty stopping Buffalo quarterback Josh Allen, who passed for three touchdowns and ran for another in building the Bills' 25-point lead midway through the third quarter. The Rams answered with an 8-play, 75-yard drive that ended with Jared Goff scoring from one yard out on a quarterback sneak. A questionable interception of Allen on the next drive by Rams safety John Johnson, who was credited with the pick after reaching for the ball as tight end Tyler Kroft caught it, helped to set up a 25-yard touchdown pass from Goff to wide receiver Robert Woods, who was playing for the first time against the team that originally drafted him. Woods, who finished with five receptions for 74 yards, had a 31-yard catch that set up Goff's second touchdown pass of the day, this time to wide receiver Cooper Kupp with 10:40 remaining in the game. Goff connected with tight end Tyler Higbee for a successful two-point conversion to close to within 28–25. Running back Darrell Henderson had a strong game for the second straight week, rushing 20 times for 114 yards and gave the Rams their first and only lead of the game on a 1-yard run with 4:33 to play. The 25-point comeback was the best Rams rally since a 31–27 victory against Tampa Bay in 1992. The defense was led by defensive tackle Aaron Donald, who had two sacks among his six total tackles, including a forced fumble that he recovered to set up the Rams' go-ahead score. However, Allen was able to evade a furious Rams pass rush to make several late conversions and, after a likewise controversial pass interference call on fourth down against L.A. cornerback Darious Williams, connected with Tyler Kroft on a 3-yard scoring toss to reclaim the lead and ultimately the victory with just 15 seconds remaining. Kupp led the Rams with six receptions for 107 yards while Goff, who completed 23 of 31 for 321 yards, surpassed 15,000 career passing yards (15,082).

==== Week 4: vs. New York Giants ====
Week Four: New York Giants at Los Angeles Rams – Game summary

Quarter	1	2	3	4	Total
Giants	0	6	0	3	**9**
**Rams**	7	3	0	7	**17**

at SoFi Stadium, Inglewood, California

- Date: October 4
- Game time: 1:05 pm. PDT
- Game weather: Sunny, 86 °F (30 °C)
- Game attendance: 0
- Referee: John Hussey
- TV announcers (Fox): Adam Amin, Mark Schlereth and Lindsay Czarniak
- Recap, Game Book

Game information

**First quarter**

- LAR – Gerald Everett 2-yard run (Sam Sloman kick), 6:19. Rams 7–0. **Drive: 12 plays, 65 yards, 7:01.**

**Second quarter**

- NYG – Graham Gano 35-yard field goal, 14:51. Rams 7–3. **Drive: 6 plays, 17 yards, 2:54.**
- LAR – Sam Sloman 32-yard field goal, 3:52. Rams 10–3. **Drive: 15 plays, 47 yards, 7:14.**
- NYG – Graham Gano 37-yard field goal, 0:00. Rams 10–6. **Drive: 13 plays, 56 yards, 3:52.**

**Third quarter**

- No scoring plays.

**Fourth quarter**

- NYG – Graham Gano 27-yard field goal, 14:11. Rams 10–9. **Drive: 11 plays, 48 yards, 6:14.**
- LAR – Cooper Kupp 55-yard pass from Jared Goff (Sam Sloman kick), 6:56. Rams 17–9. **Drive: 8 plays, 91 yards, 2:50.**

**Top passers**

- NYG – Daniel Jones – 23/36, 190 yards, INT
- LAR – Jared Goff – 25/32, 200 yards, TD

**Top rushers**

- NYG – Wayne Gallman – 6 rushes, 45 yards
- LAR – Malcolm Brown – 9 rushes, 37 yards

**Top receivers**

- NYG – Darius Slayton – 3 receptions, 48 yards
- LAR – Cooper Kupp – 5 receptions, 69 yards, TD

The Rams started quickly, but then had to hold on to beat the visiting Giants and improve to 3–1 on the season. Tight end Gerald Everett took in a handoff from quarterback Jared Goff for a 2-yard run to score the first rushing touchdown of his career, capping off L.A.'s efficient 12-play, 65-yard opening drive. From there, Los Angeles struggled offensively, as a second quarter drive saw the Rams reach New York's 4-yard-line before Goff was sacked and then completed two passes for minus-2 yards. Sam Sloman converted a 32-yard field goal to give L.A. a 10–3 lead. Though the Giants were able to control the ball and had a clear edge in time of possession (33:17 to 26:43), the Rams defense collected five sacks of New York quarterback Daniel Jones and limited the Giants to three Graham Gano field goals, the last coming less than a minute into the fourth quarter to pull New York to within 10–9. After the teams exchanged punts, the Rams came up with their biggest offensive play of the day as Goff found wide receiver Cooper Kupp over the middle. Kupp turned upfield and outraced Giants defenders to the end zone to complete the 55-yard touchdown pass play and extend the Rams' lead to 17–9 after Sloman's successful PAT. New York drove into Rams territory on its final two possessions but was turned away both times. With just under a minute remaining, Jones's pass attempt to wide receiver Damion Ratley was intercepted by Rams cornerback Darious Williams at the Los Angeles 7-yard-line to preserve the victory. Safety Taylor Rapp led the Rams with eight tackles, while cornerback Jalen Ramsey added four solo tackles, including a critical stop of Giants wide receiver Golden Tate for a 1-yard loss on a third-and-3 play near midfield, which was soon followed by the Rams' final touchdown. Following the game, Ramsey and Tate got into a fight that would lead to disciplinary action by the NFL. The Rams, who improved to 2–0 on the season at SoFi Stadium, also debuted their Royal-and-Sol jersey-and-pants combination, which had been spurred by fan demand.

==== Week 5: at Washington Football Team ====
Week Five: Los Angeles Rams at Washington Football Team – Game summary

Quarter	1	2	3	4	Total
**Rams**	6	14	3	7	**30**
Washington	7	3	0	0	**10**

at FedExField, Landover, Maryland

- Date: October 11
- Game time: 1:00 pm. EDT/10:00 am. PDT
- Game weather: Cloudy, 69 °F (21 °C)
- Game attendance: 0
- Referee: Shawn Smith
- TV announcers (Fox): Brandon Gaudin, Daryl Johnston and Pam Oliver
- Recap, Game Book

Game information

**First quarter**

- LAR – Darrell Henderson 1-yard run (kick failed), 7:29. Rams 6–0. **Drive: 10 plays, 76 yards, 6:03.**
- WAS – Kyle Allen 7-yard run (Dustin Hopkins kick), 1:34. Football Team 7–6. **Drive: 10 plays, 73 yards, 5:55.**

**Second quarter**

- LAR – Robert Woods 56-yard pass from Jared Goff (Sam Sloman kick), 14:52. Rams 13–7. **Drive: 4 plays, 75 yards, 1:42.**
- LAR – Jared Goff 2-yard run (Sam Sloman kick), 7:32. Rams 20–7. **Drive: 9 plays, 83 yards, 4:40.**
- WAS – Dustin Hopkins 48-yard field goal, 0:00. Rams 20–10. **Drive: 5 plays, 20 yards, 0:49.**

**Third quarter**

- LAR – Sam Sloman 28-yard field goal, 7:04. Rams 23–10. **Drive: 10 plays, 70 yards, 3:51.**

**Fourth quarter**

- LAR – Darrell Henderson 11-yard pass from Jared Goff (Sam Sloman kick), 6:37. Rams 30–10. **Drive: 5 plays, 51 yards, 2:54.**

**Top passers**

- LAR – Jared Goff – 21/30, 309 yards, 2 TD, INT
- WAS – Kyle Allen – 9/13, 74 yards

**Top rushers**

- LAR – Cam Akers – 9 rushes, 61 yards
- WAS – Antonio Gibson – 11 rushes, 27 yards

**Top receivers**

- LAR – Gerald Everett – 4 receptions, 90 yards
- WAS – J. D. McKissic – 6 receptions, 46 yards

Aaron Donald tied a career high with four sacks and the Rams defense collected a season-high eight sacks while holding host Washington to just 108 total yards - the fewest of any team in any game all season - as Los Angeles completed a season sweep of NFC East opponents. Donald vaulted himself into the league lead in sacks, and also forced a fumble as he was named NFC Defensive Player of the Week for the seventh time in his career. Linebacker Troy Reeder added three sacks while cornerbacks Jalen Ramsey, Darious Williams, and Troy Hill limited Washington's wide receivers to just five receptions for 29 yards. Offensively, quarterback Jared Goff completed 21 of 30 passes for 309 yards and two touchdowns, while also running for another. Running back Darrell Henderson ran for one touchdown and caught another, while rookie Cam Akers led Los Angeles with 61 yards on nine carries in his first action after suffering a rib injury in Week 2. Rams head coach Sean McVay earned his first victory over Washington in what was his first return to FedExField since taking L.A.'s head coaching job four years earlier. McVay previously served as an assistant coach for the then-Washington Redskins from 2010 to 2016 under head coaches Mike Shanahan and Jay Gruden. In 2017, the then-Redskins had dealt McVay his first loss as a head coach. For the third time in McVay's head coaching tenure, the Rams completed a season sweep of another NFL division, having swept opponents from the AFC South in 2017 and the AFC West in 2018 (Los Angeles also won all six games versus NFC West opponents in 2018). The victory also spoiled the return of Washington quarterback Alex Smith, who entered the game in the second quarter to play in an NFL game for the first time since suffering a catastrophic leg injury two years earlier.

==== Week 6: at San Francisco 49ers ====
Week Six: Los Angeles Rams at San Francisco 49ers – Game summary

Quarter	1	2	3	4	Total
Rams	0	6	3	7	**16**
**49ers**	7	14	0	3	**24**

at Levi's Stadium, Santa Clara, California

- Date: October 18
- Game time: 5:20 pm. PDT
- Game weather: Sunny, 86 °F (30 °C)
- Game attendance: 0
- Referee: Carl Cheffers
- TV announcers (NBC): Al Michaels, Cris Collinsworth and Michele Tafoya
- Recap, Game Book

Game information

**First quarter**

- SF – Deebo Samuel 6-yard pass from Jimmy Garoppolo (Robbie Gould kick), 11:39. 49ers 7–0. **Drive: 6 plays, 76 yards, 3:21.**

**Second quarter**

- SF – George Kittle 44-yard pass from Jimmy Garoppolo (Robbie Gould kick), 14:14. 49ers 14–0. **Drive: 10 plays, 87 yards, 6:08.**
- LAR – Robert Woods 10-yard pass from Jared Goff (kick blocked), 9:03. 49ers 14–6. **Drive: 10 plays, 64 yards, 5:11.**
- SF – Brandon Aiyuk 2-yard pass from Jimmy Garoppolo (Robbie Gould kick), 1:47. 49ers 21–6. **Drive: 13 plays, 75 yards, 7:16.**

**Third quarter**

- LAR – Samuel Sloman 42-yard field goal, 12:06. 49ers 21–9. **Drive: 7 plays, 48 yards, 2:54.**

**Fourth quarter**

- SF – Robbie Gould 49-yard field goal, 5:26. 49ers 24–9. **Drive: 7 plays, 20 yards, 3:15.**
- LAR – Josh Reynolds 40-yard pass from Jared Goff (Sam Sloman kick), 3:24. 49ers 24–16. **Drive: 10 plays, 79 yards, 2:02.**

**Top passers**

- LAR – Jared Goff – 19/38, 198 yards, 2 TD, INT
- SF – Jimmy Garoppolo – 23/33, 268 yards, 3 TD

**Top rushers**

- LAR – Darrell Henderson – 14 rushes, 88 yards
- SF – Raheem Mostert – 17 rushes, 65 yards

**Top receivers**

- LAR – Tyler Higbee – 3 receptions, 56 yards
- SF – George Kittle – 7 receptions, 109 yards, TD

On Sunday Night Football, the Rams fell behind 14–0 and never recovered on the road at Levi's Stadium in their first division game of the season. 49ers quarterback Jimmy Garoppolo threw three touchdown passes in the first half, improving his lifetime record against Los Angeles to 4–0 as San Francisco staked out a 21–6 halftime lead. L.A.'s only points before halftime came on a 10-yard pass from Jared Goff to Robert Woods in the second quarter, but kicker Samuel Sloman missed the PAT. Sloman converted a 42-yard field goal in the third period, and Josh Reynolds caught a 40-yard TD pass from Goff late in the fourth quarter as the Rams fell to 4–2.

==== Week 7: vs. Chicago Bears ====
Week Seven: Chicago Bears at Los Angeles Rams – Game summary

Quarter	1	2	3	4	Total
Bears	0	3	0	7	**10**
**Rams**	7	3	14	0	**24**

at SoFi Stadium, Inglewood, California

- Date: October 26
- Game time: 5:15 pm. PDT
- Game weather: Cloudy, 71 °F (22 °C)
- Game attendance: 0
- Referee: Bill Vinovich
- TV announcers (ESPN): Steve Levy, Brian Griese, Louis Riddick, Lisa Salters and John Parry
- Recap, Game Book

Game information

**First quarter**

- LAR – Josh Reynolds 4-yard pass from Jared Goff (Sam Sloman kick), 3:57. Rams 7–0. **Drive: 7 plays, 52 yards, 2:38.**

**Second quarter**

- CHI – Cairo Santos 42-yard field goal, 14:13. Rams 7–3. **Drive: 8 plays, 58 yards, 4:44.**
- LAR – Sam Sloman 22-yard field goal, 4:55. Rams 10–3. **Drive: 6 plays, 58 yards, 3:10.**

**Third quarter**

- LAR – Malcolm Brown 1-yard run (Sam Sloman kick), 8:06. Rams 17–3. **Drive: 7 plays, 55 yards, 2:21.**
- LAR – Gerald Everett 12-yard pass from Jared Goff (Sam Sloman kick), 1:34. Rams 24–3. **Drive: 8 plays, 80 yards, 3:33.**

**Fourth quarter**

- CHI – Eddie Jackson 8-yard fumble return (Cairo Santos kick), 7:30. Rams 24–10.

**Top passers**

- CHI – Nick Foles – 28/40, 261 yards, 2 INT
- LAR – Jared Goff – 23/33, 219 yards, 2 TD

**Top rushers**

- CHI – David Montgomery – 14 rushes, 48 yards
- LAR – Darrell Henderson – 15 rushes, 64 yards

**Top receivers**

- CHI – Jimmy Graham – 5 receptions, 31 yards
- LAR – Cooper Kupp – 5 receptions, 43 yards

A dominant performance by defense and special teams lifted the Rams over the visiting Bears on Monday Night Football in their third straight meeting on national TV in as many years. Playing against the team that originally drafted him, linebacker Leonard Floyd had six total tackles, including two sacks as well as three hurries of Chicago quarterback Nick Foles, who was sacked four times in total and was intercepted twice by the team he played for in 2015. Second-year safety Taylor Rapp got the first interception after a pass deflection in the end zone by cornerback Troy Hill in the third period, while the second came courtesy of cornerback Jalen Ramsey in the fourth quarter. Punter Johnny Hekker was named NFC Special Teams Player of the Week after averaging 44.2 yards on five punts (including punts of 57 and 63 yards), all of which he dropped inside the Chicago 20 to repeatedly pin the Bears deep in their own territory. On offense, Jared Goff completed 23 of 33 passes for 220 yards and touchdowns to wide receiver Josh Reynolds and tight end Gerald Everett, while Darrell Henderson had 15 rushes for 64 yards and fellow running back Malcolm Brown added 57 yards on 10 carries with a touchdown run.

==== Week 8: at Miami Dolphins ====
Week Eight: Los Angeles Rams at Miami Dolphins – Game summary

Quarter	1	2	3	4	Total
Rams	7	3	0	7	**17**
**Dolphins**	7	21	0	0	**28**

at Hard Rock Stadium, Miami Gardens, Florida

- Date: November 1
- Game time: 1:00 pm. EST/10:00 am. PST
- Game weather: Cloudy, 86 °F (30 °C)
- Game attendance: 12,397
- Referee: John Hussey
- TV announcers (Fox): Kenny Albert, Jonathan Vilma and Shannon Spake
- Recap, Game Book

Game information

**First quarter**

- LAR – Robert Woods 4-yard run (Kai Forbath kick), 11:13. Rams 7–0. **Drive: 3 plays, 15 yards, 1:25.**
- MIA – DeVante Parker 3-yard pass from Tua Tagovailoa (Jason Sanders kick), 0:00. Tied 7–7. **Drive: 6 plays, 33 yards, 2:55.**

**Second quarter**

- MIA – Andrew Van Ginkel 78-yard fumble return (Jason Sanders kick), 10:01. Dolphins 14–7.
- MIA – Jakeem Grant 88-yard punt return (Jason Sanders kick), 8:44. Dolphins 21–7.
- MIA – Myles Gaskin 1-yard run (Jason Sanders kick), 2:47. Dolphins 28–7. **Drive: 1 play, 1 yard, 0:04.**
- LAR – Kai Forbath 23-yard field goal, 0:11. Dolphins 28–10. **Drive: 13 plays, 70 yards, 2:36.**

**Third quarter**

- No scoring plays.

**Fourth quarter**

- LAR – Robert Woods 11-yard pass from Jared Goff (Kai Forbath kick), 9:58. Dolphins 28–17. **Drive: 10 plays, 89 yards, 4:09.**

**Top passers**

- LAR – Jared Goff – 35/61, 355 yards, TD, 2 INT
- MIA – Tua Tagovailoa – 12/22, 93 yards, TD

**Top rushers**

- LAR – Darrell Henderson – 8 rushes, 47 yards
- MIA – Myles Gaskin – 18 rushes, 47 yards, TD

**Top receivers**

- LAR – Cooper Kupp – 11 receptions, 110 yards
- MIA – Durham Smythe – 2 receptions, 16 yards

Despite holding clear advantages of total offensive yards (471 to 145) and time of possession (36:30 to 23:30), the Rams were undone by four turnovers in losing to the host Dolphins. Early in the first quarter, defensive tackle Aaron Donald sacked Miami rookie quarterback Tua Tagovailoa, forcing a fumble that was recovered by linebacker Leonard Floyd at the Dolphin 15. Three plays later, wide receiver Robert Woods scored on a 4-yard run. Late in the first quarter, Rams quarterback Jared Goff was intercepted, which led to a Miami touchdown. Early in the second quarter, Rams safety Taylor Rapp forced a fumble that was recovered by cornerback Troy Hill to set up first-and-goal at the Miami 7. But two plays later, Goff was sacked by Dolphins defensive end Emmanuel Ogbah, who forced a fumble that was picked up by linebacker Andrew Van Ginkel, who returned it 78 yards for a touchdown. After the Rams were forced to punt on their next possession, Miami's Jakeem Grant returned the kick 88 yards for a score. Goff threw another interception and lost another fumble that led to another touchdown for the Dolphins, who led 28–7 just before halftime. Newly acquired kicker Kai Forbath converted a 23-yard field goal late in the second period but missed from 48 yards out in the fourth quarter in his first game with the Rams. Goff, who completed 35 of 61 attempts for 355 yards, connected with Woods on an 11-yard touchdown pass in the fourth period for the 100th TD pass of his career.

==== Week 10: vs. Seattle Seahawks ====
Week Ten: Seattle Seahawks at Los Angeles Rams – Game summary

Quarter	1	2	3	4	Total
Seahawks	7	6	0	3	**16**
**Rams**	10	7	6	0	**23**

at SoFi Stadium, Inglewood, California

- Date: November 15
- Game time: 1:25 pm. PST
- Game weather: Sunny, 78 °F (26 °C)
- Game attendance: 0
- Referee: Clete Blakeman
- TV announcers (Fox): Joe Buck, Troy Aikman and Erin Andrews
- Recap, Game Book

Game information

**First quarter**

- LAR – Kai Forbath 23-yard field goal, 9:37. Rams 3–0. **Drive: 10 plays, 70 yards, 5:23.**
- SEA – Alex Collins 13-yard run (Jason Myers kick), 6:00. Seahawks 7–3. **Drive: 7 plays, 78 yards, 3:37.**
- LAR – Darrell Henderson 1-yard run (Kai Forbath kick), 2:24. Rams 10–7. **Drive: 7 plays, 77 yards, 3:36.**

**Second quarter**

- LAR – Malcolm Brown 7-yard run (Kai Forbath kick), 6:19. Rams 17–7, **Drive: 13 plays, 93 yards, 6:57.**
- SEA – Jason Myers 37-yard field goal, 3:45. Rams 17–10 **Drive: 6 plays, 49 yards, 2:34.**
- SEA – Jason Myers 61-yard field goal, 0:00. Rams 17–13. **Drive: 10 plays, 48 yards, 1:11.**

**Third quarter**

- LAR – Malcolm Brown 1-yard run (kick failed, wide left), 6:22. Rams 23–13. **Drive: 14 plays, 88 yards, 6:45.**

**Fourth quarter**

- SEA – Jason Myers 39-yard field goal, 0:25. Rams 23–16. **Drive: 13 plays, 74 yards, 3:04.**

**Top passers**

- SEA – Russell Wilson – 22/37, 248 yards, 2 INT
- LAR – Jared Goff – 27/37, 302 yards

**Top rushers**

- SEA – Russell Wilson – 8 rushes, 60 yards
- LAR – Cam Akers – 10 rushes, 38 yards

**Top receivers**

- SEA – Tyler Lockett – 5 receptions, 66 yards
- LAR – Josh Reynolds – 8 receptions, 94 yards

Cornerback Darious Williams snagged two interceptions and the Rams defense sacked Seahawks quarterback Russell Wilson six times to lead Los Angeles to victory at home in a key NFC West showdown. Kai Forbath finished L.A.'s opening drive with a 23-yard field goal, while Darrell Henderson and Malcolm Brown both scored on touchdown runs to give the Rams a 17–7 lead in the second quarter. Brown added another touchdown run in the third period, while the Seahawks were limited to three field goals from kicker Jason Myers (including a Seahawks-record 61-yarder at the end of the second quarter. Linebacker Leonard Floyd had five tackles including three sacks and a fumble recovery, a performance that earned him NFC Defensive Player of the Week honors. Fellow linebackers also stood out as Terrell Lewis added two sacks and Micah Kiser led the team with 12 tackles. In all, the defense corralled Wilson for much of the day, totaling 12 quarterback hurries to go along with the six sacks. The performance of the secondary was outstanding in limiting the Seahawks' air attack. Williams stopped two scoring drives with interceptions and also had three pass deflections on the day, while fellow corner Jalen Ramsey had two tackles and was successful in limiting Seattle's leading receiver DK Metcalf to just two receptions for 28 yards. Offensively, quarterback Jared Goff passed for 302 yards and wide receiver Josh Reynolds led the Rams with eight receptions for 94 yards as the Rams improved to 9–4 against the Seahawks since 2014. The victory was marred by several injuries, as Forbath injured an ankle while tackle Andrew Whitworth suffered a torn MCL. Both players were placed on the team's injured reserve list.

==== Week 11: at Tampa Bay Buccaneers ====
Week Eleven: Los Angeles Rams at Tampa Bay Buccaneers – Game summary

Quarter	1	2	3	4	Total
**Rams**	7	10	7	3	**27**
Buccaneers	0	14	3	7	**24**

at Raymond James Stadium, Tampa, Florida

- Date: November 23
- Game time: 8:15 pm. EST/5:15 pm. PST
- Game weather: Clear, 69 °F (21 °C)
- Game attendance: 15,730
- Referee: Jerome Boger
- TV announcers (ESPN): Steve Levy, Brian Griese, Louis Riddick, Lisa Salters and John Parry
- Recap, Game Book

Game information

**First quarter**

- LAR – Robert Woods 4-yard pass from Jared Goff (Matt Gay kick), 3:55. Rams 7–0. **Drive: 13 plays, 80 yards, 7:52.**

**Second quarter**

- TB – Mike Evans 9-yard pass from Tom Brady (Ryan Succop kick), 14:10. Tied 7–7. **Drive: 10 plays, 75 yards, 4:45.**
- TB – Leonard Fournette 2-yard run (Ryan Succop kick), 8:35. Buccaneers 14–7. **Drive: 10 plays, 68 yards, 3:25.**
- LAR – Van Jefferson 7-yard pass from Jared Goff (Matt Gay kick), 4:31. Tied 14–14. **Drive: 8 plays, 75 yards, 4:04.**
- LAR – Matt Gay 38-yard field goal, 0:00. Rams 17–14. **Drive: 8 plays, 61 yards, 1:00.**

**Third quarter**

- TB – Ryan Succop 38-yard field goal, 12:41. Tied 17–17. **Drive: 4 plays, 2 yards, 0:51.**
- LAR – Cam Akers 4-yard pass from Jared Goff (Matt Gay kick), 5:39. Rams 24–17. **Drive: 5 plays, 37 yards, 2:03.**

**Fourth quarter**

- TB – Chris Godwin 13-yard pass from Tom Brady (Ryan Succop kick), 3:53. Tied 24–24. **Drive: 7 plays, 44 yards, 3:24.**
- LAR – Matt Gay 40-yard field goal, 2:36. Rams 27–24. **Drive: 8 plays, 53 yards, 1:21.**

**Top passers**

- LAR – Jared Goff – 39/51, 376 yards, 3 TD, 2 INT
- TB – Tom Brady – 26/48, 216 yards, 2 TD, 2 INT

**Top rushers**

- LAR – Malcolm Brown – 3 rushes, 20 yards
- TB – Ronald Jones II – 10 rushes, 24 yards

**Top receivers**

- LAR – Cooper Kupp – 11 receptions, 146 yards
- TB – Antonio Brown – 8 receptions, 57 yards

In a high-stakes battle on Monday Night Football, the Rams took down the favored Buccaneers for the fourth straight time at Raymond James Stadium dating back to 2012. Quarterback Jared Goff completed 39 of 51 passes for 376 yards and touchdowns to three different receivers. Wide receiver Robert Woods caught a 4-yard TD pass to cap off the Rams' opening offensive drive, then late in the second period took a short pass from Goff and weaved his way for a 35-yard gain down to the Tampa Bay 20, which led to a 38-yard field goal by newly-acquired kicker Matt Gay, who had kicked for the Buccaneers in 2019. Leading 17–14 at halftime, the Rams never trailed in the second half as Goff hit rookie running back Cam Akers for a TD on a swing pass out of the backfield in the third quarter, and Gay added a 40-yard field goal with 2:40 remaining in the game. Woods was named NFC Offensive Player of the Week after finishing with 12 receptions for 130 yards and a score. Fellow wide receiver Cooper Kupp caught 11 passes for 146 yards and rookie wideout Van Jefferson scored the first touchdown of his NFL career off a 7-yard pass from Goff in the second quarter. On defense, free safety Jordan Fuller intercepted Buccaneers quarterback Tom Brady twice in the second half. The first, coming midway through the third period, led to a Rams touchdown, while the second came just after the two-minute warning and the Rams were able to run out the clock. The win gave head coach Sean McVay victories over every team in the NFC other than his own and improved the Rams' head-to-head record vs the Buccaneers to 6–1 in their last seven meetings.

==== Week 12: vs. San Francisco 49ers ====
Week Twelve: San Francisco 49ers at Los Angeles Rams – Game summary

Quarter	1	2	3	4	Total
**49ers**	7	0	10	6	**23**
Rams	3	0	10	7	**20**

at SoFi Stadium, Inglewood, California

- Date: November 29
- Game time: 1:05 pm. PST
- Game weather: Sunny, 72 °F (22 °C)
- Game attendance: 0
- Referee: Scott Novak
- TV announcers (Fox): Chris Myers, Greg Jennings and Jen Hale
- Recap, Game Book

Game information

**First quarter**

- LAR – Matt Gay 48-yard field goal, 6:56. Rams 3–0. **Drive: 6 plays, 41 yards, 2:19.**
- SF – Raheem Mostert 8-yard run (Robbie Gould kick), 4:10. 49ers 7–3. **Drive: 5 plays, 75 yards, 2:42.**

**Second quarter**

- No scoring plays.

**Third quarter**

- SF – Javon Kinlaw 27-yard interception return (Robbie Gould kick), 14:22. 49ers 14–3.
- SF – Robbie Gould 46-yard field goal, 4:30. 49ers 17–3. **Drive: 10 plays, 55 yards, 5:36.**
- LAR – Matt Gay 41-yard field goal, 2:38. 49ers 17–6. **Drive: 7 plays, 53 yards, 1:52.**
- LAR – Troy Hill 20-yard fumble return (Matt Gay kick), 2:32. 49ers 17–13.

**Fourth quarter**

- LAR – Cam Akers 1-yard run (Matt Gay kick), 14:17. Rams 20–17. **Drive: 3 plays, 68 yards, 1:15.**
- SF – Robbie Gould 44-yard field goal, 3:11. Tied 20–20. **Drive: 10 plays, 49 yards, 5:34.**
- SF – Robbie Gould 42-yard field goal, 0:00. 49ers 23–20. **Drive: 11 plays, 56 yards, 2:10.**

**Top passers**

- SF – Nick Mullens – 24/35, 253 yards, INT
- LAR – Jared Goff – 19/31, 198 yards, 2 INT

**Top rushers**

- SF – Raheem Mostert – 16 rushes, 43 yards, TD
- LAR – Cam Akers – 9 rushes, 84 yards, TD

**Top receivers**

- SF – Deebo Samuel – 11 receptions, 134 yards
- LAR – Robert Woods – 7 receptions, 80 yards

The Rams stumbled badly, suffering four turnovers to the rival 49ers in L.A.'s first-ever loss at SoFi Stadium. After Los Angeles took a first quarter lead on a 48-yard field goal by Matt Gay in the first quarter, visiting San Francisco seized the advantage with an 8-yard touchdown run by running back Raheem Mostert. Rams quarterback Jared Goff fumbled once in the second quarter to stop an L.A. drive into 49er territory and threw two interceptions, the second of which was returned 27 yards for a touchdown by San Francisco defensive tackle Javon Kinlaw to give the 49ers a 14–3 lead just after the start of the third quarter. After a Robbie Gould field goal extended the visitors' lead to 17–3, the Rams answered with a 41-yard field goal by Gay. On the ensuing possession, Rams defensive tackle Aaron Donald tackled and forced Mostert to fumble, and the loose ball was picked up by cornerback Troy Hill, who returned it 20 yards for a touchdown. After the Rams forced the 49ers to punt, rookie running back Cam Akers broke loose for a 61-yard run down to the San Francisco 7 to end the third quarter. Two plays into the fourth period, Akers scored his first career rushing touchdown to give the Rams a 20–17 lead. However, the 49er defense stiffened and kept the Rams from crossing midfield. Though the Rams defense also played hard as linebacker Troy Reeder led the team with 15 total tackles, San Francisco prevailed on their final drives with field goals by Gould that went for 44 yards with 3:11 left and the final 42-yard kick came as time ran out, giving the 49ers their fourth straight win over the Rams, and a sweep of the intra-state series for the second straight season. Wide receiver Robert Woods led the Rams with seven receptions for 80 yards.

==== Week 13: at Arizona Cardinals ====
Week Thirteen: Los Angeles Rams at Arizona Cardinals – Game summary

Quarter	1	2	3	4	Total
**Rams**	0	14	3	21	**38**
Cardinals	7	0	7	14	**28**

at State Farm Stadium, Glendale, Arizona

- Date: December 6
- Game time: 2:05 p.m. MST/1:05 pm. PST
- Game weather: Sunny, 71 °F (22 °C) (retractable roof open)
- Game attendance: 0
- Referee: Jerome Boger
- TV announcers (Fox): Chris Myers, Brock Huard and Greg Jennings
- Recap, Game Book

Game information

**First quarter**

- ARI – Dan Arnold 59-yard pass from Kyler Murray (Zane Gonzalez kick), 13:25. Cardinals 7–0. **Drive: 4 plays, 75 yards, 1:35.**

**Second quarter**

- LAR – Cam Akers 9-yard run (Matt Gay kick), 10:35. Tied 7–7. **Drive: 14 plays, 85 yards, 7:12.**
- LAR – Tyler Higbee 1-yard pass from Jared Goff (Matt Gay kick), 0:51. Rams 14–7. **Drive: 9 plays, 45 yards, 3:27.**

**Third quarter**

- LAR – Matt Gay 39-yard field goal, 10:26. Rams 17–7. **Drive: 8 plays, 54 yards, 3:27.**
- ARI – DeAndre Hopkins 4-yard pass from Kyler Murray (Zane Gonzalez kick), 4:03. Rams 17–14. **Drive: 15 plays, 75 yards, 6:23.**

**Fourth quarter**

- LAR – Jared Goff 1-yard run (Matt Gay kick), 14:52. Rams 24–14. **Drive: 9 plays, 75 yards, 4:11.**
- ARI – Kenyan Drake 4-yard run (Zane Gonzalez kick), 13:21. Rams 24–21. **Drive: 2 plays, 15 yards, 0:25.**
- LAR – Darrell Henderson 38-yard run (Matt Gay kick), 10:07. Rams 31–21. **Drive: 7 plays, 76 yards, 3:14.**
- LAR – Troy Hill 35-yard interception return (Matt Gay kick), 4:33. Rams 38–21.
- ARI – Dan Arnold 2-yard pass from Kyler Murray (Zane Gonzalez kick), 2:04. Rams 38–28. **Drive: 8 plays, 47 yards, 2:29.**

**Top passers**

- LAR – Jared Goff – 37/47, 351 yards, TD
- ARI – Kyler Murray – 21/39, 173 yards, 3 TD, INT

**Top rushers**

- LAR – Cam Akers – 21 rushes, 72 yards, TD
- ARI – Kenyan Drake – 10 rushes, 49 yards, TD

**Top receivers**

- LAR – Robert Woods – 10 receptions, 85 yards
- ARI – DeAndre Hopkins – 8 receptions, 52 yards, TD

The visiting Rams maintained their dominance over the Cardinals, pulling away in the fourth quarter for their sixth straight win at State Farm Stadium going back to 2015. After giving up an early touchdown, Los Angeles pulled ahead in the second quarter on a 9-yard run by running back Cam Akers to cap a 14-play, 85-yard drive, and quarterback Jared Goff's 1-yard TD pass to tight end Tyler Higbee. Goff, who completed 37 of 47 passes for 351 yards, added a touchdown run on a quarterback sneak early in the fourth quarter, while running back Darrell Henderson broke loose for a 38-yard touchdown run as the Rams offense outgained the Cardinals 463 yards to 232 and dominated time of possession 38:53 to 21:07. Cornerback Troy Hill capped off L.A.'s stellar defensive effort with a 35-yard touchdown interception return of a pass by Arizona quarterback Kyler Murray, who was held to just 15 rushing yards on the day. The victory, combined with the Seattle Seahawks' upset loss to the New York Giants the same day, put the Rams back in first place in the NFC West with four weeks remaining in the NFL regular season.

==== Week 14: vs. New England Patriots ====
Week Fourteen: New England Patriots at Los Angeles Rams – Game summary

Quarter	1	2	3	4	Total
Patriots	0	3	0	0	**3**
**Rams**	10	7	7	0	**24**

at SoFi Stadium, Inglewood, California

- Date: December 10
- Game time: 5:20 pm. PST
- Game weather: Clear, 60 °F (16 °C)
- Game attendance: 0
- Referee: Craig Wrolstad
- TV announcers (Fox/NFLN/Amazon Prime): Joe Buck, Troy Aikman, Erin Andrews and Kristina Pink
- Recap, Game Book

Game information

**First quarter**

- LAR – Jared Goff 1-yard run (Matt Gay kick), 11:21. Rams 7–0. **Drive: 6 plays, 75 yards, 3:39.**
- LAR – Matt Gay 35-yard field goal, 5:16. Rams 10–0. **Drive: 11 plays, 60 yards, 4:25.**

**Second quarter**

- LAR – Kenny Young 79-yard interception return (Matt Gay kick), 14:46. Rams 17–0.
- NE – Nick Folk 29-yard field goal, 1:04. Rams 17–3. **Drive: 8 plays, 57 yards, 3:36.**

**Third quarter**

- LAR – Cooper Kupp 2-yard pass from Jared Goff (Matt Gay kick), 1:33. Rams 24–3. **Drive: 16 plays, 90 yards, 9:42.**

**Fourth quarter**

- No scoring plays.

**Top passers**

- NE – Cam Newton – 9/16, 119 yards
- LAR – Jared Goff – 16/25, 137 yards, TD, INT

**Top rushers**

- NE – Damien Harris – 11 rushes, 50 yards
- LAR – Cam Akers – 29 rushes, 171 yards

**Top receivers**

- NE – Damiere Byrd – 5 receptions, 48 yards
- LAR – Tyler Higbee – 5 receptions, 33 yards, TD

Rookie running back Cam Akers rushed for a season-high 171 yards on 29 carries and was named NFC Offensive Player of the Week (the sixth Rams player to earn Player of the Week honors during season) as he powered Los Angeles to its fourth win in five weeks. Facing the Patriots for the first time since their 13–3 loss in Super Bowl LIII, the host Rams dominated from the opening drive, going 75 yards in six plays to finish with quarterback Jared Goff scoring on a 1-yard run. Kicker Matt Gay added a 35-yard field goal on L.A.'s second drive midway through the opening period. Following a Rams turnover off a tipped pass at the end of the first quarter, Rams linebacker Kenny Young picked off a Cam Newton pass and returned it 79 yards for a touchdown at the start of the second quarter. The Los Angeles defense turned in a strong effort, limiting the Patriots to just 220 total yards and one field goal while eight of 12 New England drives were held to four plays or less. Defensive end Michael Brockers had two of the Rams' six total sacks, while defensive tackle Aaron Donald added 1.5 sacks. Wide receiver Cooper Kupp caught a 2-yard TD pass from Goff for the only score of the second half, as L.A. assured itself of a winning record at its new home by improving to 5–1 at SoFi Stadium. The win not only was the Rams' first victory over the Patriots since 2001, when they were then based in St. Louis, but it also secured the team's fourth straight winning season and snapped a 7 game losing streak to the Patriots that had started with Super Bowl XXXVI.

==== Week 15: vs. New York Jets ====
Week Fifteen: New York Jets at Los Angeles Rams – Game summary

Quarter	1	2	3	4	Total
**Jets**	7	6	10	0	**23**
Rams	0	3	7	10	**20**

at SoFi Stadium, Inglewood, California

- Date: December 20
- Game time: 1:05 pm. PST
- Game weather: Sunny, 77 °F (25 °C)
- Game attendance: 0
- Referee: Tony Corrente
- TV announcers (Fox): Kevin Kugler, Brock Huard and Laura Okmin
- Recap, Game Book

Game information

**First quarter**

- NYJ – Ty Johnson 18-yard pass from Sam Darnold (Sam Ficken kick), 6:25. Jets 7–0. **Drive: 13 plays, 74 yards, 7:12.**

**Second quarter**

- NYJ – Sam Ficken 39-yard field goal, 12:44. Jets 10–0. **Drive: 4 plays, 6 yards, 1:30.**
- NYJ – Sam Ficken 25-yard field goal, 7:37. Jets 13–0. **Drive: 5 plays, 15 yards, 2:09.**
- LAR – Matt Gay 45-yard field goal, 0:00. Jets 13–3. **Drive: 8 plays, 34 yards, 0:57.**

**Third quarter**

- NYJ – Frank Gore 1-yard run (Sam Ficken kick), 8:30. Jets 20–3. **Drive: 11 plays, 72 yards, 6:30.**
- LAR – Robert Woods 15-yard pass from Jared Goff (Matt Gay kick), 6:09. Jets 20–10. **Drive: 5 plays, 75 yards, 2:21.**
- NYJ – Sam Ficken 21-yard field goal, 1:39. Jets 23–10. **Drive: 10 plays, 72 yards, 4:30.**

**Fourth quarter**

- LAR – Tyler Higbee 3-yard pass from Jared Goff (Matt Gay kick), 13:47. Jets 23–17. **Drive: 6 plays, 75 yards, 2:52.**
- LAR – Matt Gay 42-yard field goal, 6:35. Jets 23–20. **Drive: 11 plays, 46 yards, 5:13.**

**Top passers**

- NYJ – Sam Darnold – 22/31, 207 yards, TD
- LAR – Jared Goff – 22/34, 209 yards, 2 TD, INT

**Top rushers**

- NYJ – Frank Gore – 23 rushes, 59 yards, TD
- LAR – Cam Akers – 15 rushes, 63 yards

**Top receivers**

- NYJ – Jamison Crowder – 6 receptions, 66 yards
- LAR – Robert Woods – 6 receptions, 56 yards, TD

The Jets pulled off the most shocking upset of the NFL season, stunning the host Rams for their first win of the season. New York, entering the game with an 0–13 record and as a 17-point underdog, drove 76 yards in 13 plays on their opening offensive drive, capping it with an 18-yard touchdown pass from former USC quarterback Sam Darnold to Ty Johnson. Jets kicker Sam Ficken, who had played for the Rams in 2018, added a pair of field goals from 39 and 25 yards in the second quarter as New York built a 13–0 lead. The field goals were set up by a blocked punt off Rams punter Johnny Hekker and a Jared Goff interception. Matt Gay's 45-yard field goal at the end of the second quarter got L.A. on the scoreboard, but the Jets answered with another long touchdown drive to start the second half. Veteran running back Frank Gore's 1-yard TD run ended an 11-play, 72-yard drive that lasted 6 1/2 minutes. The Rams answered as Goff connected with Robert Woods for a 15-yard touchdown pass. However, the Jets answered with another long scoring drive, going 72 yards in 10 plays down to the Los Angeles 3, which ended in a 21-yard field goal by Ficken for a 23–10 lead. The Rams pulled close in the fourth quarter with a 3-yard TD pass from Goff to tight end Tyler Higbee and a 42-yard field goal by Gay. But after the defense forced the Jets to punt, the Rams' final offensive drive stalled at the New York 37 after an illegal block penalty wiped out a 22-yard run by rookie running Cam Akers and Goff's final two passes fell incomplete. Akers, who ran 15 times for 63 yards, also had an 18-yard touchdown run that would have tied the game nullified by a holding penalty. Linebacker Troy Reeder had a team-high 11 tackles, while linebacker Samson Ebukam and defensive tackle Morgan Fox each had a sack for the Rams' defense.

==== Week 16: at Seattle Seahawks ====
Week Sixteen: Los Angeles Rams at Seattle Seahawks – Game summary

Quarter	1	2	3	4	Total
Rams	3	3	0	3	**9**
**Seahawks**	0	6	7	7	**20**

at Lumen Field, Seattle, Washington

- Date: December 27
- Game time: 1:25 pm. PST
- Game weather: Cloudy, 45 °F (7 °C)
- Game attendance: 0
- Referee: Bill Vinovich
- TV announcers (Fox): Joe Buck, Troy Aikman and Erin Andrews
- Recap, Game Book

Game information

**First quarter**

- LAR – Matt Gay 44-yard field goal, 6:17. Rams 3–0. **Drive: 14 plays, 62 yards, 5:57.**

**Second quarter**

- SEA – Jason Myers 45-yard field goal, 12:43. Tied 3–3. **Drive: 9 plays, 34 yards, 3:01.**
- LAR – Matt Gay 51-yard field goal, 9:33. Rams 6–3. **Drive: 10 plays, 42 yards, 3:10.**
- SEA – Jason Myers 49-yard field goal, 1:04. Tied 6–6. **Drive: 9 plays, 34 yards, 2:27.**

**Third quarter**

- SEA – Russell Wilson 3-yard run (Jason Myers kick), 10:32. Seahawks 13–6. **Drive: 7 plays, 70 yards, 4:28.**

**Fourth quarter**

- LAR – Matt Gay 33-yard field goal, 12:49. Seahawks 13–9. **Drive: 10 plays, 29 yards, 4:16.**
- SEA – Jacob Hollister 13-yard pass from Russell Wilson (Jason Myers kick), 2:51. Seahawks 20–9. **Drive: 9 plays, 80 yards, 4:29.**

**Top passers**

- LAR – Jared Goff – 24/43, 234 yards, INT
- SEA – Russell Wilson – 20/32, 225 yards, TD

**Top rushers**

- LAR – Darrell Henderson – 12 rushes, 62 yards
- SEA – Chris Carson – 16 rushes, 69 yards

**Top receivers**

- LAR – Cooper Kupp – 8 receptions, 66 yards
- SEA – DK Metcalf – 6 receptions, 59 yards

The host Seahawks pulled away from the Rams in the second half to clinch the NFC West for the first time since 2016. Los Angeles took a 6–3 lead in the second quarter after field goals by kicker Matt Gay of 44 and 51 yards. But the Rams hurt themselves badly on their next two drives as quarterback Jared Goff threw an errant pass that was intercepted by Seattle cornerback Quandre Diggs at the Seahawks' 10-yard line. After Seattle went ahead 13–6 in the third quarter, the Rams responded by driving down to the Seattle 1. But successive run attempts by Goff and Malcolm Brown were stopped and L.A. turned over the ball on downs. Goff passed for 234 yards while playing half the game with a broken thumb on his right throwing hand. Gay added a 33-yard field goal in the fourth quarter to account for all of the Rams' scoring. Though he was sacked five times by the Rams' defense (twice by linebacker Leonard Floyd), Seahawks quarterback Russell Wilson scored on a 3-yard run and passed for 225 yards and another touchdown.

==== Week 17: vs. Arizona Cardinals ====
Week Seventeen: Arizona Cardinals at Los Angeles Rams – Game summary

Quarter	1	2	3	4	Total
Cardinals	7	0	0	0	**7**
**Rams**	0	12	3	3	**18**

at SoFi Stadium, Inglewood, California

- Date: January 3, 2021
- Game time: 1:25 pm. PST
- Game weather: Cloudy, 59 °F (15 °C)
- Game attendance: 0
- Referee: Carl Cheffers
- TV announcers (CBS): Jim Nantz, Boomer Esiason, Tracy Wolfson and Gene Steratore
- Recap, Game Book

Game information

**First quarter**

- ARI – Jonathan Ward 11-yard pass from Chris Streveler (Mike Nugent kick), 10:09. Cardinals 7–0. **Drive: 2 plays, 14 yards, 0:39.**

**Second quarter**

- LAR – Matt Gay 28-yard field goal, 14:17. Cardinals 7–3. **Drive: 16 plays, 69 yards, 7:44.**
- LAR – Justin Pugh penalty enforced in end zone for a safety, 5:31. Cardinals 7–5.
- LAR – Troy Hill 84-yard interception return (Matt Gay kick), 0:20. Rams 12–7.

**Third quarter**

- LAR – Matt Gay 34-yard field goal, 6:16. Rams 15–7. **Drive: 13 plays, 59 yards, 8:44.**

**Fourth quarter**

- LAR – Matt Gay 27-yard field goal, 14:25. Rams 18–7. **Drive: 11 plays, 71 yards, 3:46.**

**Top passers**

- ARI – Chris Streveler – 11/16, 105 yards, TD, INT
- LAR – John Wolford – 22/38, 231 yards, INT

**Top rushers**

- ARI – Kenyan Drake – 10 rushes, 36 yards
- LAR – John Wolford – 6 rushes, 56 yards

**Top receivers**

- ARI – Dan Arnold – 3 receptions, 46 yards
- LAR – Cam Akers – 4 receptions, 52 yards

The Rams shut down the visiting Cardinals to secure their third playoff appearance in four seasons as head coach Sean McVay maintained his undefeated record against Arizona (8–0). With Jared Goff sidelined after having surgery to repair his broken thumb, backup quarterback John Wolford got his first career start. Wolford, who had not seen any action during the previous 15 games, had his first NFL pass intercepted to set up a Cardinals' touchdown. After an exchange of punts, Wolford led the Rams on a 16-play, 69-yard drive that reached the Arizona 1, but successive false start penalties moved the ball back and Los Angeles settled for a 28-yard field goal by Matt Gay. The Rams reached the Arizona 1 again on their next drive, going 81 yards in 13 plays before running back Cam Akers was stripped of the ball at the goal line. Arizona's celebration was short-lived as a holding call in the end zone gave the Rams a safety two plays later. Defensively, the Rams knocked out Cardinals quarterback Kyler Murray early in the game, and late in the second quarter, Arizona backup QB Chris Streveler was intercepted by L.A. cornerback Troy Hill, who returned it 84 yards for a touchdown and a 12–7 Rams lead with 20 seconds left before halftime. Defensively, the Rams clamped down on the Cardinals' running game, which produced just 48 yards on the ground. Gay added two more field goals in the second, while Wolford was able to guide the offense effectively, completing 22 of 38 passes for 231 yards while also rushing for 56 yards on six carries, including a crucial 9-yard run on a 3rd-and-8 situation late in the final period to seal the win.

=== Standings ===
==== Division ====
NFC West
	W	L	T	PCT	DIV	CONF	PF	PA	STK
^{(3)} Seattle Seahawks	12	4	0	.750	4–2	9–3	459	371	W4
^{(6)} Los Angeles Rams	10	6	0	.625	3–3	9–3	372	296	W1
Arizona Cardinals	8	8	0	.500	2–4	6–6	410	367	L2
San Francisco 49ers	6	10	0	.375	3–3	4–8	376	390	L1

==== Conference ====
NFC
#	Team	Division	W	L	T	PCT	DIV	CONF	SOS	SOV	STK
**Division leaders**
1	Green Bay Packers	North	13	3	0	.813	5–1	10–2	.428	.387	W6
2 (Note: New Orleans finished ahead of Seattle based on conference record.)	New Orleans Saints	South	12	4	0	.750	6–0	10–2	.459	.406	W2
3	Seattle Seahawks	West	12	4	0	.750	4–2	9–3	.447	.404	W4
4	Washington Football Team	East	7	9	0	.438	4–2	5–7	.459	.388	W1
**Wild cards**
5	Tampa Bay Buccaneers	South	11	5	0	.688	4–2	8–4	.488	.392	W4
6	Los Angeles Rams	West	10	6	0	.625	3–3	9–3	.494	.484	W1
7 (Note: Chicago finished and clinched the 7th and final playoff spot ahead of Arizona based on better win percentage in common games (against Detroit, the NY Giants, Carolina, and the LA Rams, Chicago finished 3–2, while Arizona finished 1–4).)	Chicago Bears	North	8	8	0	.500	2–4	6–6	.488	.336	L1
**Did not qualify for the postseason**
8	Arizona Cardinals	West	8	8	0	.500	2–4	6–6	.475	.441	L2
9	Minnesota Vikings	North	7	9	0	.438	4–2	5–7	.504	.366	W1
10 (Note: San Francisco finished ahead of the NY Giants based on head-to-head victory. Division tie break was initially used to eliminate Dallas (see below).)	San Francisco 49ers	West	6	10	0	.375	3–3	4–8	.549	.448	L1
11 (Note: NY Giants won tiebreaker over Dallas based on division record.)	New York Giants	East	6	10	0	.375	4–2	5–7	.502	.427	W1
12	Dallas Cowboys	East	6	10	0	.375	2–4	5–7	.471	.333	L1
13 (Note: Carolina finished ahead of Detroit based on head-to-head victory.)	Carolina Panthers	South	5	11	0	.313	1–5	4–8	.531	.388	L1
14	Detroit Lions	North	5	11	0	.313	1–5	4–8	.508	.350	L4
15	Philadelphia Eagles	East	4	11	1	.281	2–4	4–8	.537	.469	L3
16	Atlanta Falcons	South	4	12	0	.250	1–5	2–10	.551	.391	L5
**Tiebreakers** (Note: When breaking ties for three or more teams under the NFL's rules, they are first broken within divisions, then comparing only the highest-ranked remaining team from each division.)

== Postseason ==
=== Schedule ===
Round	Date	Opponent (seed)	Result	Record	Venue	Recap
Wild Card	January 9, 2021	at Seattle Seahawks (3)	W 30–20	1–0	Lumen Field	Recap
Divisional	January 16, 2021	at Green Bay Packers (1)	L 18–32	1–1	Lambeau Field	Recap

=== Game summaries ===
==== NFC Wild Card Playoffs: at (3) Seattle Seahawks ====
NFC Wild Card Playoffs: (6) Los Angeles Rams at (3) Seattle Seahawks – Game summary

Quarter	1	2	3	4	Total
Rams	3	17	0	10	30
Seahawks	0	10	3	7	20

at Lumen Field, Seattle, Washington

- Date: January 9, 2021
- Game time: 1:40 p.m. PST
- Game weather: Cloudy, 39 °F (4 °C)
- Game attendance: 0
- Referee: John Hussey
- TV announcers (Fox): Joe Buck, Troy Aikman, Erin Andrews and Tom Rinaldi
- Recap, Game Book

Game information

First quarter

- LAR – Matt Gay 40-yard field goal, 3:52. Rams 3–0. Drive: 12 plays, 58 yards, 6:28.

Second quarter

- SEA – Jason Myers 50-yard field goal, 10:29. Tied 3–3. Drive: 5 plays, 19 yards, 1:50.
- LAR – Matt Gay 39-yard field goal, 7:51. Rams 6–3. Drive: 6 plays, 54 yards, 2:38.
- LAR – Darious Williams 42-yard interception return (Matt Gay kick), 6:40. Rams 13–3.
- SEA – DK Metcalf 51-yard pass from Russell Wilson (Jason Myers kick), 3:43. Rams 13–10. Drive: 5 plays, 74 yards, 2:57.
- LAR – Cam Akers 5-yard run (Matt Gay kick), 1:57. Rams 20–10. Drive: 5 plays, 75 yards, 1:46.

Third quarter

- SEA – Jason Myers 52-yard field goal, 13:45. Rams 20–13. Drive: 4 plays, 7 yards, 1:15.

Fourth quarter

- LAR – Matt Gay 36-yard field goal, 11:33. Rams 23–13. Drive: 9 plays, 52 yards, 5:07.
- LAR – Robert Woods 15-yard pass from Jared Goff (Matt Gay kick), 4:46. Rams 30–13. Drive: 4 plays, 36 yards, 2:16.
- SEA – DK Metcalf 12-yard pass from Russell Wilson (Jason Myers kick), 2:28. Rams 30–20. Drive: 8 plays, 76 yards, 2:18.

Top passers

- LAR – Jared Goff – 9/19, 155 yards, TD
- SEA – Russell Wilson – 11/27, 174 yards, 2 TD, INT

Top rushers

- LAR – Cam Akers – 28 rushes, 131 yards, TD
- SEA – Chris Carson – 16 rushes, 77 yards

Top receivers

- LAR – Cooper Kupp – 4 receptions, 78 yards
- SEA – DK Metcalf – 5 receptions, 96 yards, 2 TD

A dominant performance by the NFL's No. 1-ranked defense and a breakout performance by rookie running back Cam Akers lifted the Rams to an upset victory over the host Seahawks. The Rams' triumph ended a 10-game postseason home win streak for Seattle at dating back to 2004, when the then-St. Louis Rams defeated the Seahawks 27–20 in an NFC Wild Card Game at Lumen Field, then known as Qwest Field. After an exchange of opening-drive punts, Los Angeles pushed into Seattle territory as Akers ran five times for 35 yards. Starting for the second straight week, quarterback John Wolford completed passes of 15 and 13 yards to wide receiver Cooper Kupp, but was then knocked out of the game after colliding with Seattle safety Jamal Adams on a scramble down to the Seahawks 18. The drive ended in a 40-yard field goal by kicker Matt Gay. After Seattle tied the game early in the second quarter, Rams quarterback Jared Goff (still nursing a broken thumb suffered during the teams' previous meeting two weeks earlier) misfired on his first four pass attempts before connecting with Kupp on a 44-yard pass play that led to a 39-yard field goal by Gay. On the Seahawks' next possession, cornerback Darious Williams picked off a Russell Wilson pass and returned it 42 yards for a touchdown. Seattle was able to answer with a long touchdown pass from Wilson to wide receiver DK Metcalf on a broken play, but the Rams countered with a 75-yard scoring drive. Akers took a dump-off pass from Goff and turned it into a 44-yard gain, then ran for 20 yards on his next carry that would ultimately set up his own score on a 5-yard run and a 20–10 halftime lead for L.A. In the fourth quarter, Gay would add his third field goal of the day from 36 yards and after Micah Kiser recovered a fumble on a Seahawks punt return, Goff found wide receiver Robert Woods wide open for a 15-yard TD pass to give the Rams a 30–13 advantage. Defensively both linebacker Leonard Floyd and defensive tackle Aaron Donald had two sacks each of Wilson, who was sacked five times in total and was hit a total of 10 times. The Seahawks were limited to 278 yards and were forced to punt eight times. Akers' 131 rushing yards (on 28 carries) was the fifth-best single-game performance in Rams' postseason history, and his 176 yards in total offense ranked No. 3 all-time for Los Angeles in the playoffs. Also, for the first time in the entire season, the Rams did not suffer a turnover.

==== NFC Divisional Playoffs: at (1) Green Bay Packers ====
NFC Divisional Playoffs: (6) Los Angeles Rams at (1) Green Bay Packers – Game summary

Quarter	1	2	3	4	Total
Rams	3	7	8	0	18
Packers	3	16	6	7	32

at Lambeau Field, Green Bay, Wisconsin

- Date: January 16, 2021
- Game time: 3:35 p.m. CST/1:35 pm. PST
- Game weather: Cloudy, 35 °F (2 °C)
- Game attendance: 7,439
- Referee: Ronald Torbert
- TV announcers (Fox): Kevin Burkhardt, Daryl Johnston, Pam Oliver and Kristina Pink
- Recap, Game Book

Game information

First quarter

- GB – Mason Crosby 24–yard field goal, 8:39. Packers 3–0. Drive: 12 plays, 63 yards, 4:46.
- LAR – Matt Gay 37–yard field goal, 4:36. Tied 3–3. Drive: 8 plays, 62 yards, 4:03.

Second quarter

- GB – Davante Adams 1–yard pass from Aaron Rodgers (Mason Crosby kick), 11:37. Packers 10–3. Drive: 14 plays, 84 yards, 7:59.
- GB – Aaron Rodgers 1–yard run (pass failed), 3:29. Packers 16–3. 9 plays, 47 yards, 5:46.
- LAR – Van Jefferson 4–yard pass from Jared Goff (Matt Gay kick), 0:29. Packers 16–10. Drive: 9 plays, 75 yards, 3:00.
- GB – Mason Crosby 39–yard field goal, 0:00. Packers 19–10. Drive: 5 plays, 54 yards, 0:29.

Third quarter

- GB – Aaron Jones 1–yard run (pass failed), 12:10. Packers 25–10. Drive: 6 plays, 75 yards, 2:10.
- LAR – Cam Akers 7–yard run (Jared Goff–Cam Akers pass), 1:41. Packers 25–18. Drive: 11 plays, 79 yards, 5:45.

Fourth quarter

- GB – Allen Lazard 58–yard pass from Aaron Rodgers (Mason Crosby kick), 6:52. Packers 32–18. Drive: 5 plays, 73 yards, 2:54.

Top passers

- LAR – Jared Goff – 21/27, 174 yards, TD
- GB – Aaron Rodgers – 23/36, 296 yards, 2 TD

Top rushers

- LAR – Cam Akers – 18 carries, 90 yards, TD
- GB – Aaron Jones – 14 carries, 99 yards, TD

Top receivers

- LAR – Josh Reynolds – 3 receptions, 65 yards
- GB – Allen Lazard – 4 receptions, 96 yards, TD

The top-seeded Packers played mistake-free football and turned away the visiting Rams to advance to the NFC Championship game for the second consecutive year. Green Bay controlled the line of scrimmage in the first half and scored on every drive to build a 19–10 first half lead, mounting scoring drives of 12, 14, and 10 plays against the top-ranked Rams defense. Quarterback Aaron Rodgers threw a 1-yard touchdown pass to wide receiver Davante Adams in the second quarter, capping off a drive that was extended by an uncharacteristic 15-yard personal foul penalty on Aaron Donald, who had only one assist as he appeared limited due to a rib injury suffered a week earlier. Rodgers, who added a 1-yard TD run later in the period, finished the day with 296 passing yards and was not sacked. For the Rams, Jared Goff returned to the starting lineup and completed 21 of 27 passes for 174 yards and a touchdown pass to rookie wide receiver Van Jefferson from 4 yards out late in the second quarter to pull within 16–10. Running back Cam Akers continued a strong postseason push, rushing for 90 yards on 18 carries, including a 7-yard touchdown run out of a wildcat formation play in the third quarter. Akers scored on a two-point conversion play to keep the Rams within a touchdown, but the Packers sealed the win with a touchdown pass in the fourth quarter. Linebacker Troy Reeder had 13 tackles for the Rams defense, which gave up a season-high 484 yards in the loss.

== Awards and honors ==
Recipient	Award(s)
Micah Kiser	Week 2: NFC Defensive Player of the Week
Aaron Donald	Week 5: NFC Defensive Player of the Week
Johnny Hekker	Week 7: NFC Special Teams Player of the Week
Leonard Floyd	Week 10: NFC Defensive Player of the Week
Robert Woods	Week 11: NFC Offensive Player of the Week
Cam Akers	Week 14: NFC Offensive Player of the Week

Recipient	Award(s)
Johnny Hekker	October: NFC Special Teams Player of the Month
