= Sam Sloman =

American football player (born 1997)

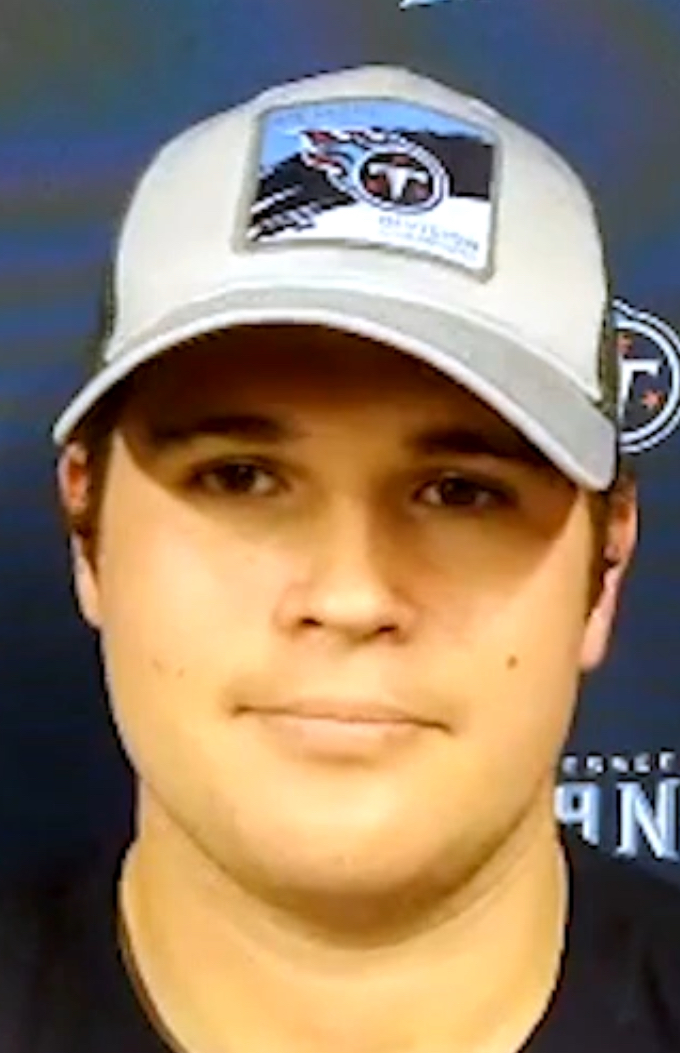
- Sloman with the Tennessee Titans in 2021

No. 1, 2
- Position: Placekicker

Personal information
- Born: September 19, 1997 (age 29); Roswell, Georgia, U.S.
- Listed height: 5 ft 8 in (1.73 m)
- Listed weight: 205 lb (93 kg)

Career information
- High school: Pace Academy (Atlanta, Georgia)
- College: Miami (OH) (2016–2019)
- NFL draft: 2020: 7th round, 248th overall pick

Career history
- Los Angeles Rams (2020); Tennessee Titans (2020); Pittsburgh Steelers (2021–2022)*; San Francisco 49ers (2022)*; Vegas Vipers (2023)
- * Offseason or practice squad member only

Awards and highlights
- Second-team All-MAC (2019)

Career NFL statistics
- Field goals: 10
- Field goal attempts: 13
- Longest field goal: 47
- Stats at Pro Football Reference

Samuel Cole Sloman (born September 19, 1997) is an American former professional football player who was a placekicker in the National Football League (NFL). He played college football for the Miami RedHawks, and in 2019, he made 86.7% of his field goal attempts (leading all kickers in the nation). Sloman was selected by the Los Angeles Rams in the seventh round of the 2020 NFL draft. He was also a member of the Tennessee Titans, Pittsburgh Steelers, San Francisco 49ers, and Vegas Vipers.

== Early life ==
Sloman was born to Jay and Judi Sloman on September 19, 1997, in Roswell, Georgia.

In high school, Sloman attended Pace Academy in the Buckhead area of Atlanta, Georgia. He earned two letters in football, and four letters in soccer. Sloman did not start playing football until his junior year. As a senior, Sloman connected on 20-of-23 kicks, with a long of 53 yards, and also made all 51 extra points. He was a two-time All-State kicker, and a 2015 MaxPreps First Team All-American.

== College career ==
Sloman attended Miami University in Ohio, majoring in kinesiology. During his career with the Miami Redhawks football team, Sloman completed 49-of-62 field goal attempts for 79%. On extra point attempts, he made 112-for-115 for 97.4%. As a senior in 2019, Sloman made 86.7% of his field goal attempts (leading his conference and all kickers in the country with 30 or more attempts), went 11-for-14 from beyond 40 yards, and was 4-for-5 on field goal attempts longer than 50 yards (with a long of 53 yards).

Sloman earned Second-Team All-Mid-American Conference honors, and was named Second-Team All-America by The Athletic. He ranks second in field goals (49) and extra points (112) and third in percentage (.790) all-time for Miami. Lance Zierlein of nfl.com described Sloman as: "Stocky with plenty of fire in his belly."

== Professional career ==
=== Los Angeles Rams ===
Sloman was selected by the Los Angeles Rams in the seventh round (248th overall) of the 2020 NFL draft, even though kickers are rarely selected in the NFL draft. The Rams were impressed by his past performance in the clutch, with Rams senior personnel executive Brian Xanders noting: "In the second half or overtime during the last two years, he went 27 out of 29. So when the score is tight or it’s getting close to the end of the game, he’s been clutch." Xanders added that he liked Sloman's angle of approach, similar to a powerful golf swing, and "he's gotten better every year [...] He's a powerful guy, he's a weather kicker, and he's a competitor. He just wants to take everybody's job." Sloman was the first Miami University kicker to be drafted in the NFL, and its 40th player.

On July 28, 2020, Sloman signed a four-year, $3.37 million contract. He was named the Rams' starting kicker, beating out fellow rookies Lirim Hajrullahu and Austin MacGinnis. When Sloman was asked if he was nervous about kicking in front of no fans at SoFi Stadium, Sloman said: "It's not going to be weird for me not having fans at the games. I played plenty of games in college [at Miami] with not many people there." After playing in the team's first seven games, he was waived on October 27. Sloman had converted 8-of-11 field goal attempts, with a long of 42, and was 18-for-21 on extra point attempts.

=== Tennessee Titans ===
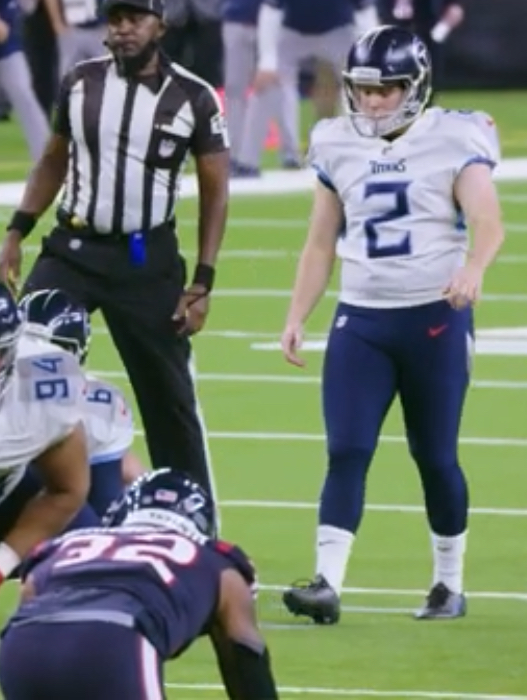
Sloman in January 2021

On November 24, 2020, Sloman was signed to the Tennessee Titans' practice squad. Following an injury to Stephen Gostkowski, Sloman was elevated to the active roster on January 2, 2021, for the team's Week 17 matchup against the Houston Texans. He hit all five extra point attempts and both field goals, including the game-winner that hit the right upright from 37 yards away as time expired, with which the Titans won the AFC South.

Sloman was released on January 12.

=== Pittsburgh Steelers ===
On July 1, 2021, the Pittsburgh Steelers signed Sloman to a one-year deal. He was waived on August 17. Sloman was re-signed to practice squad on November 27.

Sloman signed a reserve/future contract with the Steelers on January 18, 2022. He was waived on May 16.

=== San Francisco 49ers ===
On October 12, 2022, Sloman was signed to the San Francisco 49ers practice squad. He was released six days later.

=== Vegas Vipers ===
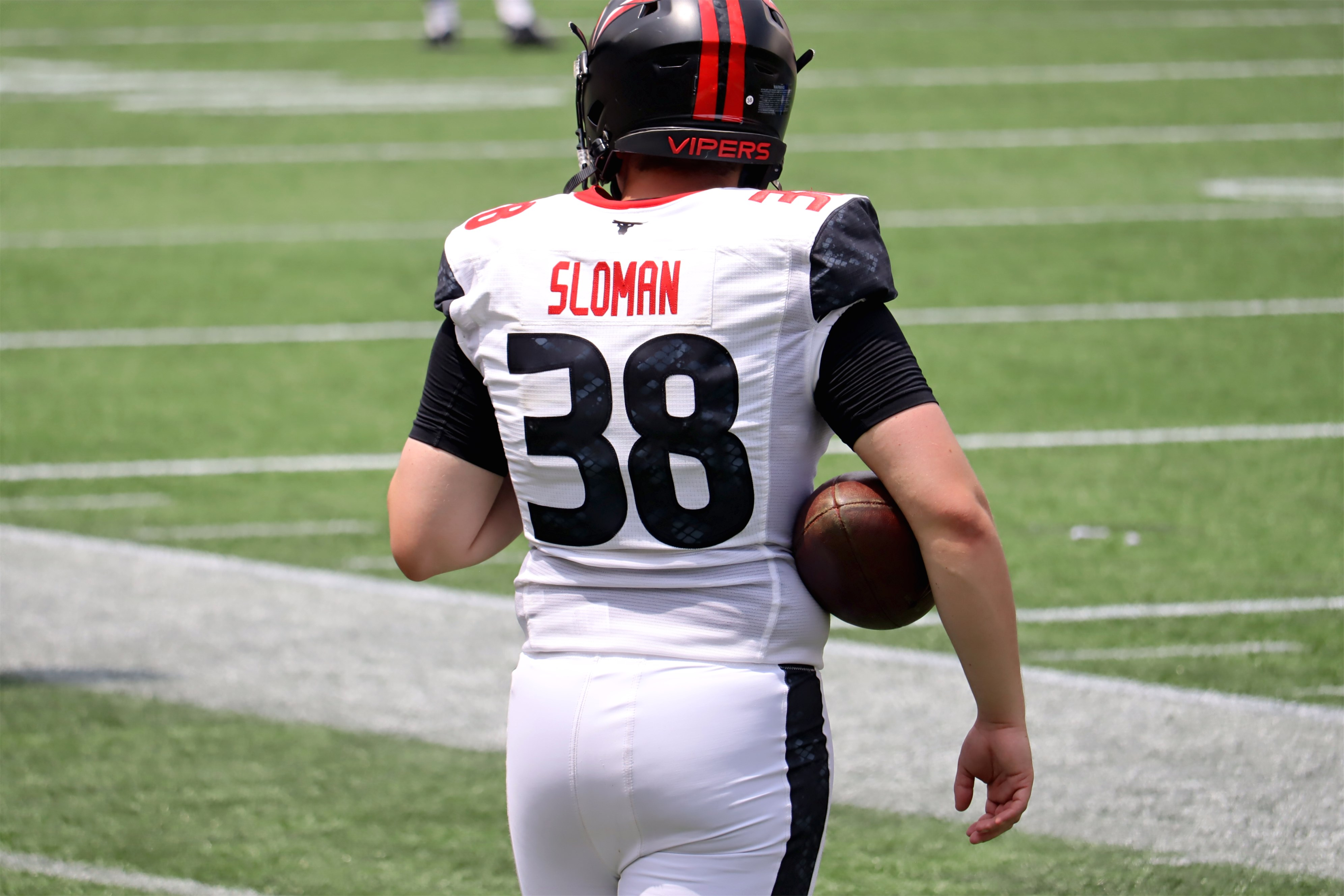
Sloman in 2023

On April 4, 2023, Sloman signed with the Vegas Vipers of the XFL. The Vipers folded when the XFL and United States Football League merged to create the United Football League (UFL).

== Career statistics ==
=== NFL ===
Year	Team	GP	Field Goals									Extra Points			Points
Year	Team	GP	FGM	FGA	FG%	<20	20−29	30−39	40−49	50+	Lng	XPM	XPA	XP%	Points
2020	LAR	7	8	11	72.7	0−0	2−3	5−5	1−2	0−1	42	18	21	85.7	42
2020	TEN	1	2	2	100.0	0−0	0−0	1−1	1−1	0−0	47	5	5	100.0	11
Total		8	10	13	76.9	0−0	2−3	6−6	2−3	0−1	47	23	26	93.8	53

=== XFL ===
Year	Team	GP	Field Goals									Extra Points			Points
Year	Team	GP	FGM	FGA	FG%	<20	20−29	30−39	40−49	50+	Lng	XPM	XPA	XP%	Points
2023	VGS	3	3	5	60.0	0−0	1−1	0−0	0−1	2−3	53	0	0	0.0	9
Total		3	3	5	60.0	0−0	1−1	0−0	0−1	2−3	53	0	0	0.0	9

== Personal life ==
Sloman is Jewish, and his college teammates nicknamed him the "Kosher Cannon."

== See also ==
- List of select Jewish football players
