= Matt Gay =

American football player (born 1994)

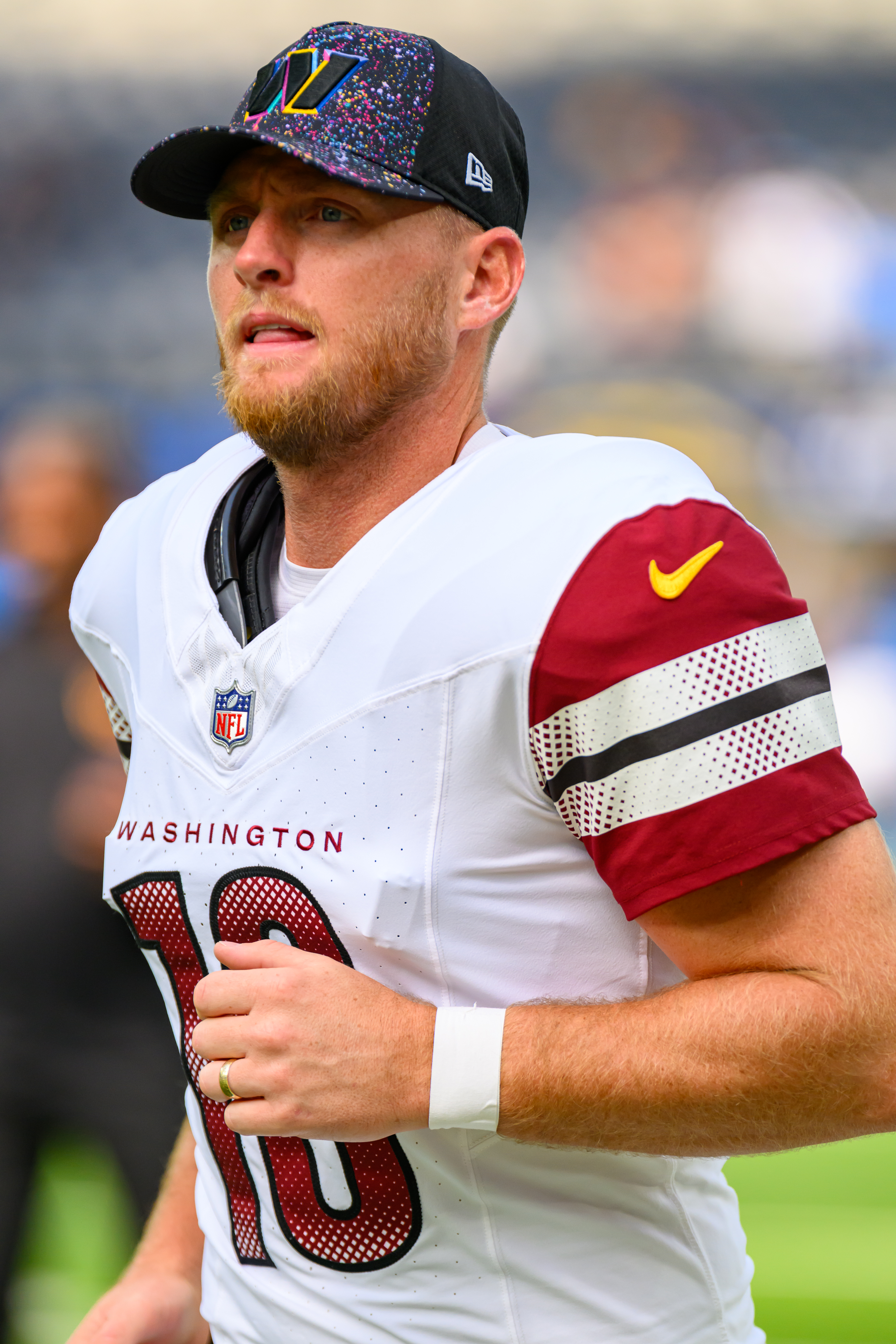
- Gay with the Washington Commanders in 2025

No. 14 – Las Vegas Raiders
- Position: Placekicker
- Roster status: Active

Personal information
- Born: March 15, 1994 (age 32); Orem, Utah, U.S.
- Listed height: 6 ft 0 in (1.83 m)
- Listed weight: 232 lb (105 kg)

Career information
- High school: Orem
- College: Utah Valley (2014–2016); Utah (2017–2018)
- NFL draft: 2019: 5th round, 145th overall pick

Career history
- Tampa Bay Buccaneers (2019); Indianapolis Colts (2020)*; Los Angeles Rams (2020–2022); Indianapolis Colts (2023–2024); Washington Commanders (2025); San Francisco 49ers (2025); Las Vegas Raiders (2026–present)
- * Offseason or practice squad member only

Awards and highlights
- Super Bowl champion (LVI); Pro Bowl (2021); Lou Groza Award (2017); Vlade Award (2017); Consensus All-American (2017); 2× first-team All-Pac-12 (2017, 2018); NFL record: Most 50+ yard field goals in a game: 4

Career NFL statistics as of Week 7, 2026
- Field goals made: 199
- Field goals attempted: 235
- Field goal %: 84.7
- Longest field goal: 59
- Touchbacks: 312
- Stats at Pro Football Reference

Matt Gay (born March 15, 1994) is an American professional football placekicker for the Las Vegas Raiders of the National Football League (NFL). He played college football for the Utah Utes and was selected by the Tampa Bay Buccaneers in the fifth round of the 2019 NFL draft. Gay has also played for the Los Angeles Rams, Indianapolis Colts, Washington Commanders, and San Francisco 49ers.

== Early life ==
Gay was born on March 15, 1994, in Orem, Utah. He played soccer and football at Orem High School, earning first-team honors in both sports. Gay was the first player from Utah to attend the U-17 USA Men's National Team residency program. After graduating in 2012, Gay played two seasons of soccer for the Utah Valley Wolverines.

== College career ==
In 2017, Gay transferred to the Utah Utes football team as a walk-on, becoming the school's seventh consensus All-American. He also won the 2017 Lou Groza Award, being the first Ute to win the award as well as being the school's second-ever finalist. Gay also won the 2017 Vlade Award. That season, he led the nation in field goals and set a new Pac-12 Conference record with 30 field goals. In 2018, Gay set school records for consecutive field goals and field goals in a game, receiving first-team All-Pac-12 honors.

== Professional career ==
Pre-draft measurables
Height	Weight	Arm length	Hand span	Wingspan
6 ft 0 in (1.83 m)	232 lb (105 kg)	30 1/2 in (0.77 m)	9 in (0.23 m)	6 ft 1 1/2 in (1.87 m)
All values from NFL Combine

=== Tampa Bay Buccaneers ===
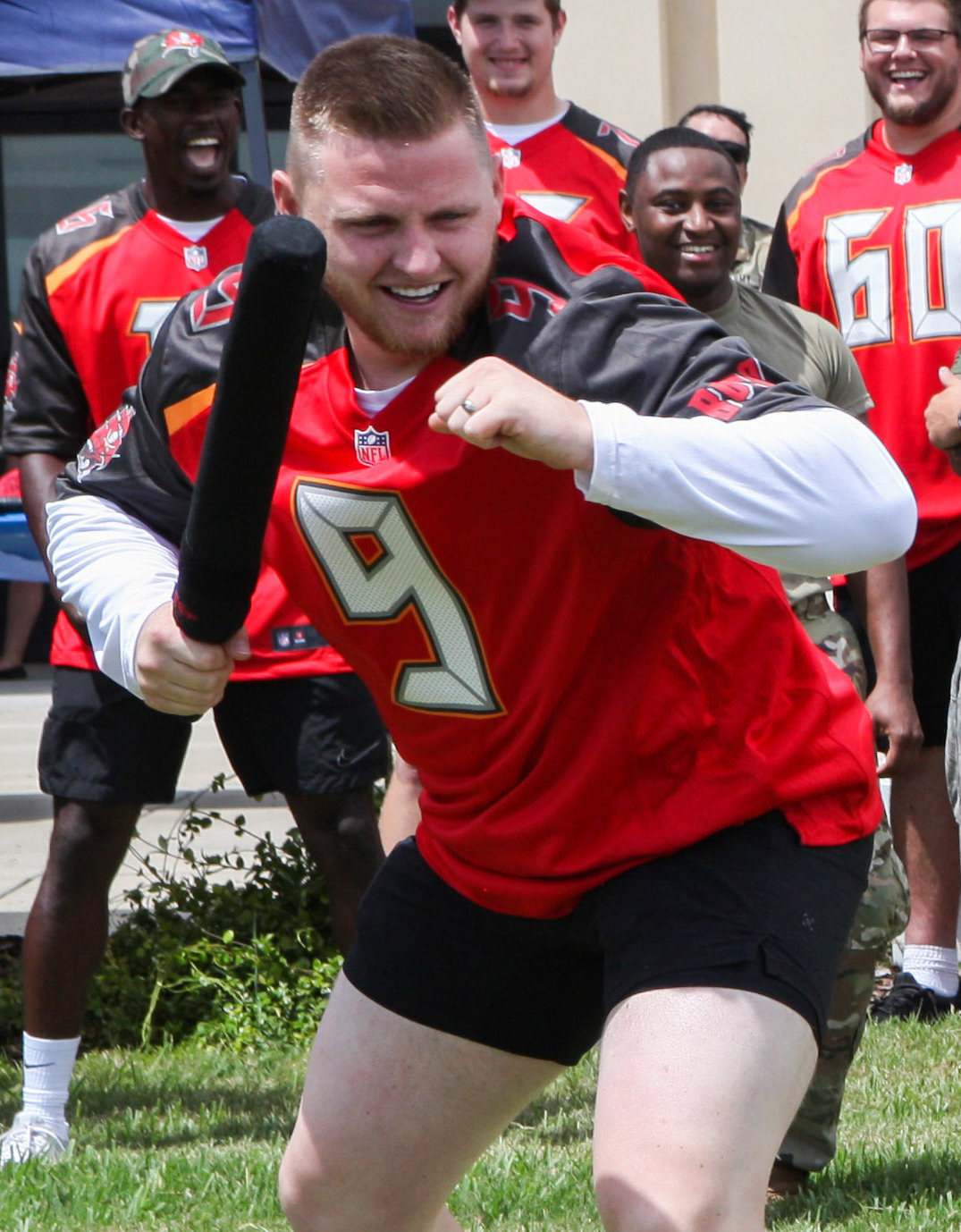
Gay in 2019

Gay was selected by the Tampa Bay Buccaneers in the fifth round (145th overall) of the 2019 NFL draft.

Gay made his professional debut in the Buccaneers' regular season opener against the San Francisco 49ers. He converted two extra points and one field goal in the loss. Two weeks later against the New York Giants, Gay missed two field goals, an extra point, and had an extra point blocked.

On September 5, 2020, Gay was waived by the Buccaneers.

=== Indianapolis Colts (first stint) ===
On September 15, 2020, Gay was signed to the Indianapolis Colts practice squad. In a roster move, he was released on November 6, but was re-signed to the practice squad the next day.

=== Los Angeles Rams ===
On November 17, 2020, Gay was signed off the Colts' practice squad by the Los Angeles Rams to replace injured kicker Kai Forbath. During Week 11 against his former team, the Buccaneers, on Monday Night Football, Gay was a perfect 3 for 3 on extra point attempts and made two of his three field goal attempts, including the game winner late in the fourth quarter, in the 27–24 victory.

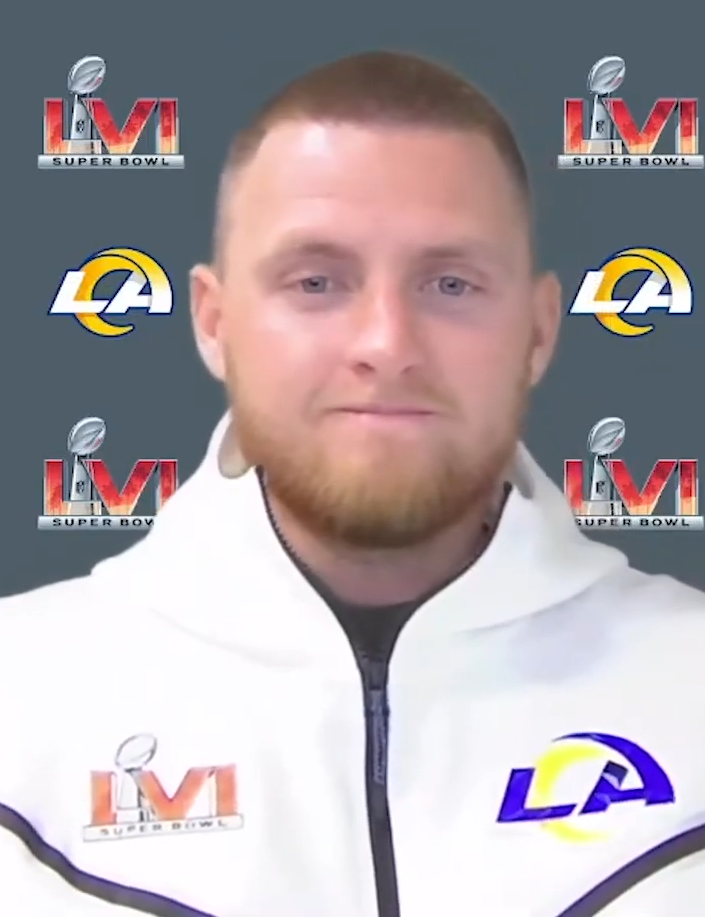
Gay in 2022

In 2021, Gay converted 32 of 34 field goal attempts and 48 of 49 points after touchdown, and was named to his first Pro Bowl. In an NFC divisional playoff game, also against the Buccaneers, he went 3 for 3 on extra-point kicks and converted three of his four field goal tries, including the game winner from 30 yards out as time expired in a 30–27 victory, which sent the Rams to the NFC Championship Game. He won his first Super Bowl title when the Rams beat the Cincinnati Bengals in Super Bowl LVI, converting a 41-yard field goal in the third quarter as well as two points after touchdowns.

On March 15, 2022, the Rams placed an original-round restricted free agent tender on Gay.

In the 2022 season, Gay was reportedly fined $5,000 due to his pants not covering his knees during a 31-10 opening game loss to the Buffalo Bills in which he made a 57-yard field goal to end the half. In week 14, Gay made the game-winning extra point to seal Baker Mayfield's comeback over the Las Vegas Raiders.

=== Indianapolis Colts (second stint) ===
On March 17, 2023, Gay signed a four-year, $22.5 million contract with the Colts. At the time of the signing, Gay's contract was the largest free-agent contract for a kicker in NFL history. During Week 3 of the 2023 season, Gay became the first kicker in NFL history to hit four 50+ yard field goals in one game, converting from 54, 53, 53, and 53 yards with the last one being an overtime game winner in the 22–19 upset victory.

On April 10, 2025, Gay was released by the Colts.

=== Washington Commanders ===
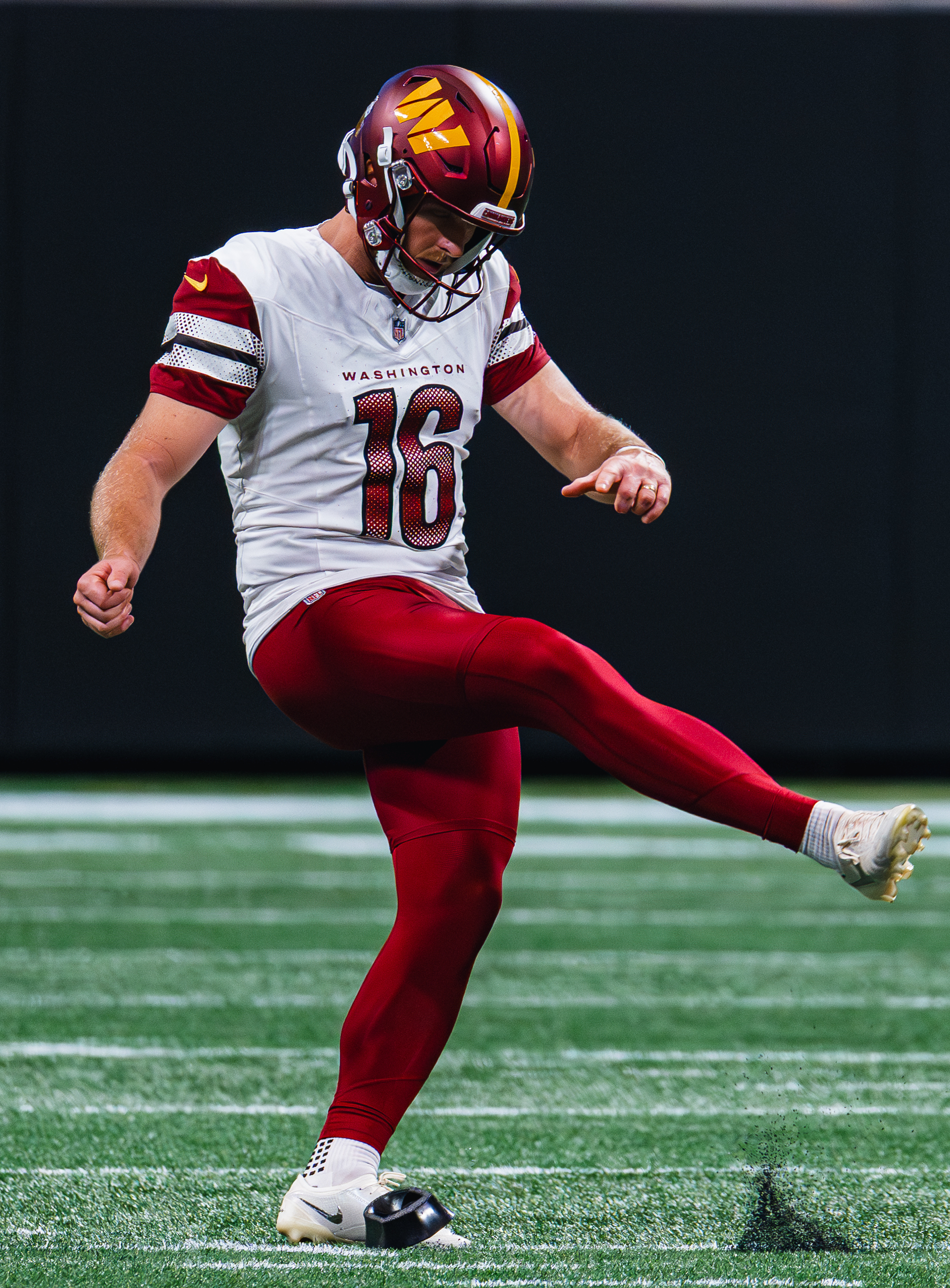
Gay with the Washington Commanders

On April 29, 2025, Gay signed a one-year contract with the Washington Commanders for $5 million with $4.25 million guaranteed. At that point in time, the amount guaranteed to Gay was the highest guaranteed on a one-year contract to a kicker in NFL history.

Gay made one of three attempts in the Week 2 loss against the Green Bay Packers; missing at 58 yards and 52 yards and making it at 51 yards. During a narrow Week 6 25–24 loss to the Chicago Bears, Gay made all three of his extra point attempts but was one for two on field goal attempts. In the first NFL International game in Madrid against the Miami Dolphins, he was two for four on his field goals attempts; missing at 51 and 56 yards. The latter field goal miss was in the fourth quarter and would have given the Commanders the lead with 10 seconds remaining, but the game went into overtime with the Dolphins winning 16–13. Gay was released by the Commanders on November 17.

=== San Francisco 49ers ===
On November 19, 2025, the San Francisco 49ers signed Gay to their practice squad amid Eddy Piñeiro dealing with a hamstring injury. He was released by the 49ers on December 9.

=== Las Vegas Raiders ===
On March 11, 2026, Gay signed a one-year, $1.6 million contract with the Las Vegas Raiders.

== NFL career statistics ==
Legend
	Won the Super Bowl
**Bold**	Career high

=== Regular season ===
General			Field goals					PATs			Kickoffs			Points
Season	Team	GP	FGM	FGA	FG%	Blck	Long	XPM	XPA	XP%	KO	Avg	TBs	Pts
2019	TB	16	27	35	77.1	**1**	58	43	48	89.6	1	14.0	0	124
2020	LAR	7	14	16	87.5	0	51	16	16	**100.0**	35	63.8	28	58
2021	LAR	**17**	32	34	**94.1**	0	55	**48**	**49**	98.0	**102**	61.9	65	**144**
2022	LAR	**17**	28	30	93.3	0	58	31	32	96.9	77	62.9	61	115
2023	IND	**17**	**33**	**41**	80.5	**1**	57	35	36	97.2	92	64.1	**72**	134
2024	IND	16	31	37	83.8	0	56	33	33	**100.0**	82	**64.4**	68	126
2025	WAS	10	13	19	68.4	0	56	22	22	**100.0**	48	57.1	10	61
2025	SF	2	4	4	100.0	0	47	4	4	**100.0**	10	59	3	16
2026	LV	3	6	6	100.0	0	**59**	8	8	**100.0**	18	59.0	3	26
Career		105	188	222	84.7	2	59	240	248	96.8	465	62.5	310	804

=== Postseason ===
General			Field goals					PATs			Kickoffs			Points
Season	Team	GP	FGM	FGA	FG%	Blck	Long	XPM	XPA	XP%	KO	Avg	TBs	Pts
2020	LAR	2	4	4	**100.0**	0	40	4	4	**100.0**	11	**65.1**	6	16
2021	LAR	**4**	**8**	**10**	80.0	0	**46**	**11**	**11**	**100.0**	**18**	63.3	**11**	**35**
Career		6	12	14	85.7	0	46	15	15	100.0	29	64.0	17	51

== Records ==
=== NFL records ===
- Most 50+ yard field goals in one game: 4 (September 24, 2023, vs. Baltimore Ravens)

==== Buccaneers franchise records ====
- Longest field goal by a rookie kicker - 58 yards (September 29, 2019, vs. Los Angeles Rams)
- Most successful field goal attempts by a rookie kicker - 27 (tied with Martin Gramatica)
- Most successful extra point attempts by a rookie kicker - 43
- Most points scored by a rookie kicker - 124

== Personal life ==
Gay is a member of The Church of Jesus Christ of Latter-day Saints, and served a mission in Houston, although it was cut short due to depression. Gay wears the initials "P.O." on a wristband to every game he plays, in honor of his high school teammate Parker Overly, who was killed in a car accident in 2017.

Gay and his wife, Millie, have three children: Oliver, Oaks, and Cosette.
