= Tyler Higbee =

American football player (born 1993)

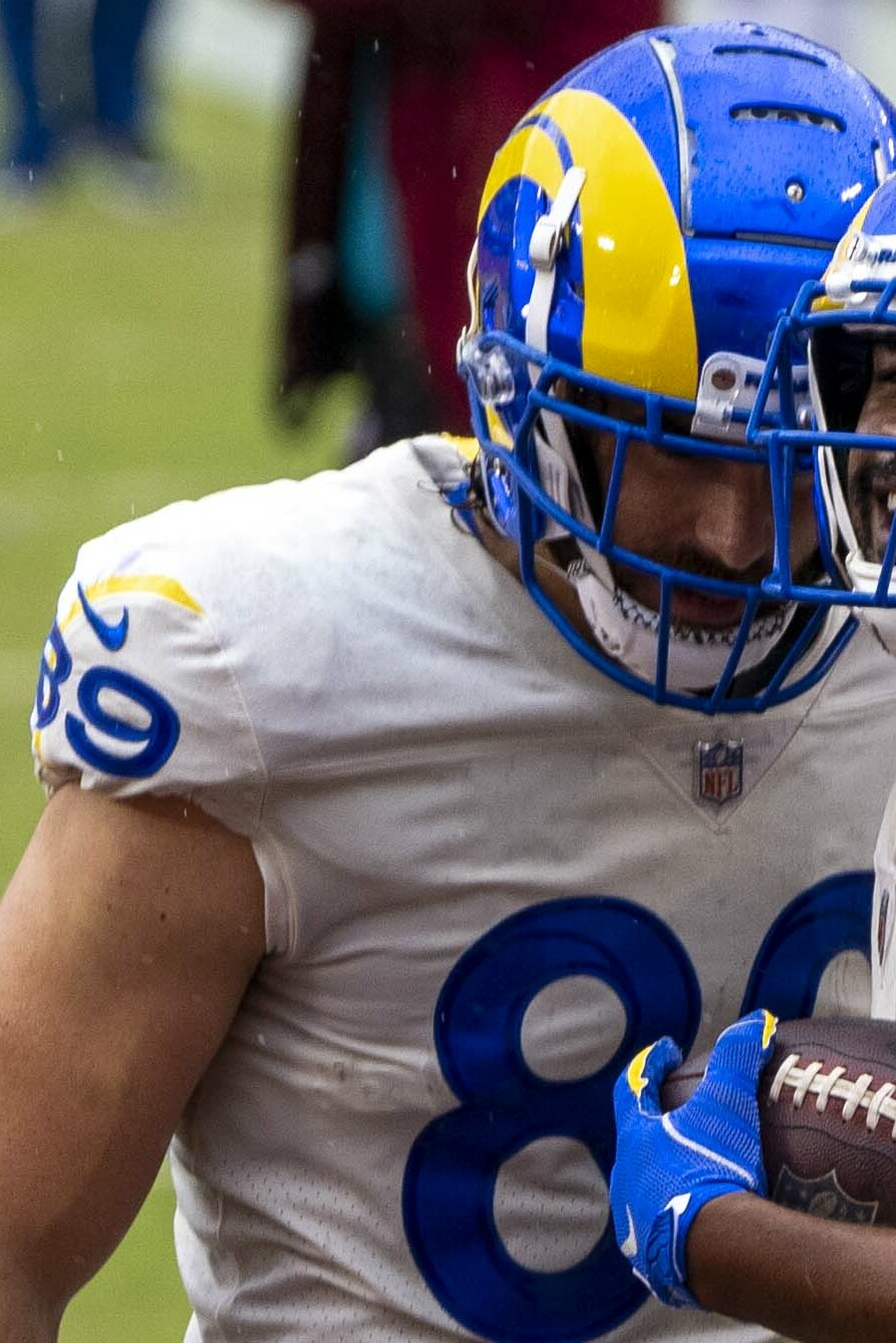
- Higbee with the Los Angeles Rams in 2020

No. 89 – Los Angeles Rams
- Position: Tight end
- Roster status: Active

Personal information
- Born: January 1, 1993 (age 33); Clearwater, Florida, U.S.
- Listed height: 6 ft 6 in (1.98 m)
- Listed weight: 253 lb (115 kg)

Career information
- High school: East Lake (Tarpon Springs, Florida)
- College: Western Kentucky (2011–2015)
- NFL draft: 2016: 4th round, 110th overall pick

Career history
- Los Angeles Rams (2016–present)

Awards and highlights
- Super Bowl champion (LVI); First-team All-Conference USA (2015)

Career NFL statistics as of Week 8, 2026
- Receptions: 413
- Receiving yards: 4,223
- Receiving touchdowns: 28
- Stats at Pro Football Reference

Tyler Higbee (born January 1, 1993) is an American professional football tight end for the Los Angeles Rams of the National Football League (NFL). He played college football for the Western Kentucky Hilltoppers and was selected by the Rams in the fourth round of the 2016 NFL draft. With the retirement of Rob Havenstein in February 2026, Higbee is currently the longest-tenured player on the Rams' roster.

== Early life ==
Higbee was born in Clearwater, Florida. He attended East Lake High School in Tarpon Springs, Florida, where he was a two-sport athlete, in football and baseball. A four-year varsity letterman he played as a wide receiver for the Eagles. As a senior football team captain, Higbee caught 42 passes for over 540 yards and eight touchdowns and was named team MVP as well as earning first team All-Pinellas County honors.

== College career ==
Considered a two-star recruit by Rivals.com, Higbee attended Western Kentucky University to play college football for the Hilltoppers. As a freshman in 2011, Higbee's first career collegiate reception went for a 63-yard touchdown in a 31–21 victory over North Texas. After redshirting for the 2012 season, he caught 13 passes for 169 yards and a touchdown as a sophomore and added 15 passes for 230 yards and four TDs his junior year. Higbee caught 38 passes for 563 yards and eight touchdowns his senior year, and helped lead the Hilltoppers to the 2015 Conference USA Championship. However, he aggravated a knee injury in the 45–28 conference title game victory over Southern Mississippi and missed Western Kentucky's 45–35 win over South Florida in the Miami Beach Bowl. He was considered one of the best tight end prospects in college football.

== Professional career ==
=== Pre-draft ===
Pre-draft measurables
Height	Weight	Arm length	Hand span	Wingspan	Bench press	Wonderlic
6 ft 5 3/4 in (1.97 m)	249 lb (113 kg)	33 1/4 in (0.84 m)	10 1/4 in (0.26 m)	6 ft 8 7/8 in (2.05 m)	18 reps	22
All values from NFL Combine/Western Kentucky's Pro Day

On December 14, 2015, it was announced that Higbee had accepted his invitation to play in the 2016 Senior Bowl. On January 23, 2016, Higbee's representatives from Select Sports Group announced they had pulled Higbee from the Senior Bowl due to the knee sprain he suffered during the season. Higbee was one of 15 collegiate tight ends to attend the NFL Scouting Combine in Indianapolis, Indiana. He was unable to perform any drills due to his knee injury, but met with teams and had measurements taken. On March 29, 2016, Higbee attended Western Kentucky's pro day, along with Brandon Doughty, Prince Charles Iworah, George Fant, and 11 other prospects. Although he was unable to physically perform, Higbee met with scouts and team representatives and scouts, including St. Louis Rams general manager Les Snead. During the draft process, he had private meetings with the Denver Broncos and New Orleans Saints. At the conclusion of the pre-draft process, Higbee was projected to be a fourth or fifth round pick by NFL draft experts and scouts. He was ranked as the fourth best tight end prospect in the draft by Sports Illustrated and the fifth best tight end by NFLDraftScout.com.

=== 2016 season ===
Higbee was drafted by the Los Angeles Rams in the fourth round (110th overall) of the 2016 NFL draft. He was the 27th player selected in the NFL Draft in Western Kentucky's school history and the highest selection since Joseph Jefferson in 2002. He also was the first player selected from Western Kentucky in 2016 and along with Brandon Doughty, and Prince Charles Iworah, made up the largest draft class in the school's history. On June 9, 2016, the Rams signed him to a four-year, $2.92 million rookie contract that included a signing bonus of $580,860.

Throughout training camp, he competed for the job as starting tight end against Lance Kendricks, Cory Harkey, Justice Cunningham, and fellow draftee Temarrick Hemingway. Head coach Jeff Fisher named Higbee the third tight end on the Rams' depth chart, behind veterans Kendricks and Harkey.

Higbee made his first professional football start and NFL debut in the Rams' season-opener at the San Francisco 49ers and caught one pass for two yards during their 28–0 loss. His first NFL reception came on the first pass of the game off a two-yard throw by quarterback Case Keenum, before he was tackled by Tank Carradine and Eric Reid. In Week 9, Higbee caught one pass for a season-high 31 yards during a 13–10 loss to the Carolina Panthers. On December 24, 2016, he caught a touchdown as the Rams lost 22–21 to the 49ers. His first NFL touchdown came on a two-yard pass by rookie quarterback Jared Goff in the fourth quarter to put the Rams up 21–7.

Higbee completed his rookie season with 11 receptions for 85 receiving yards and a touchdown in 16 games, with seven starts.

=== 2017 season ===
Higbee entered training camp competing for the starting tight end job left vacant by the departure of Lance Kendricks to the Green Bay Packers in free agency. He competed against rookie second round pick Gerald Everett, Cory Harkey, and Temarrick Hemingway. New head coach Sean McVay named him the starting tight end to begin the 2017 season.

In Week 5, Higbee caught a season-high four passes for 98 yards in a 16–10 loss to the Seattle Seahawks. During a Week 9 matchup at the New York Giants, Higbee caught an 8-yard touchdown as the Rams won 51–17.

In his first season under McVay, Higbee started all 16 games and caught 25 receptions for 298 yards and a touchdown. The Rams finished the 2017 season atop the National Football Conference (NFC) West with an 11–5 record and received a playoff berth. On January 6, 2018, Higbee started his first NFL playoff game and had an 11-yard reception as the Rams lost to the Atlanta Falcons in the Wild Card Round by a score of 26–13.

=== 2018 season ===
Higbee again started all 16 games for the Rams and his receptions (24) and receiving yards (292) came close to matching his 2017 totals, while he had two touchdown receptions on the season. He caught touchdown passes from Jared Goff in the Rams' victories over the Arizona Cardinals (34–0) and Seahawks (36–31), and he had a career-high six receptions (for 63 yards) in the Rams' 54–51 victory over the Kansas City Chiefs.

The Rams repeated as NFC West champions and hosted the Dallas Cowboys in the NFC Divisional Round. Higbee had two receptions for 30 yards in the win, which advanced Los Angeles to the NFC Championship Game. Against the Saints, he caught four passes for 25 yards, including a one-yard touchdown from Goff in the third quarter that narrowed the score to 20–17. In overtime, Higbee had two catches for 18 yards on the Rams' game-winning drive, which ended in Greg Zuerlein's 57-yard field goal to send the Rams to Super Bowl LIII. In a defensive struggle against the New England Patriots, Higbee started in the game but was held without a reception in the Rams' 13–3 loss.

=== 2019 season ===
On September 5, 2019, Higbee signed a four-year, $31 million ($15.5 million guaranteed) contract extension that would keep him with the Rams through the 2023 season. During Week 13 against the Cardinals, Higbee finished with seven catches for 107 receiving yards and a touchdown as the Rams won 34–7. During Sunday Night Football against the Seahawks in Week 14, Higbee finished with a personal single-game best 116 receiving yards as the Rams won 28–12. In Week 15 against the Cowboys, Higbee caught a career single-game high 12 passes for 111 yards as the Rams lost 21–44. During Saturday Night Football against the 49ers in Week 16, Higbee finished with 104 yards on nine receptions (his fourth straight game of 100 or more yards receiving) as the Rams lost 31–34 and were eliminated from playoff contention. Overall, Higbee finished the 2019 season with 69 receptions for 734 receiving yards (both career highs) and three receiving touchdowns.

=== 2020 season ===
In Week 2 of the 2020 season, Higbee recorded five receptions for 54 receiving yards and a career single-game high three receiving touchdowns in the 37–19 victory over the Philadelphia Eagles. Higbee would finish the season with 44 receptions for 521 yards and a career-high five touchdowns.

=== 2021 season ===
Playing in all but one game during the regular season, Higbee totaled 61 receptions for 560 yards and equaled his five touchdown catches from a year earlier. During the season, Higbee became the Rams' all-time leader in receptions and receiving yards by a tight end, surpassing marks set previously by Lance Kendricks and Billy Truax, respectively.

In the playoffs, Higbee set new postseason highs for receptions (nine) and yardage (115). However, in the NFC Championship against the 49ers, Higbee suffered a knee injury in the first quarter after catching two passes for 18 yards and missed the rest of the game. Higbee was later placed on injured reserve on February 12, 2022, the day before Super Bowl LVI. Though he did not play in the game, Higbee became a world champion when the Rams defeated the Cincinnati Bengals 23–20.

=== 2022 season ===
Higbee started all 17 games for the Rams, one of only two players (Rob Havenstein) on the offense to do so. He set a new single season career high with 72 receptions, including 10 in a 24–9 loss at the 49ers in Week 4. Higbee was held without a catch in a 16–13 loss to the Tampa Bay Buccaneers in Week 9, ending a 43-game reception streak. In a Week 15 game played on Christmas Day, Higbee had nine receptions for 94 yards and became the franchise's all-time leader in touchdown receptions for a tight end, breaking the mark of 18 previously held by Damone Johnson, with the first of his two touchdown catches in the Rams' 51–14 rout of the Broncos. Higbee also surpassed 3,000 career receiving yards in that victory, and the following week he recorded his 300th career reception in a 31–10 loss to the Los Angeles Chargers. Higbee finished with 620 receiving yards and three touchdowns to go along with his 72 receptions.

=== 2023 season ===
On September 29, 2023, Higbee signed a two-year contract extension with the Rams. Higbee started and played in 15 of the Rams' 17 regular season games, totaling 47 receptions for 495 yards with two touchdowns. On January 14, 2024, Higbee tore his ACL and MCL while trying to catch a pass from Quarterback Matthew Stafford in the fourth quarter of the Rams' NFL Wildcard playoff game against at the Detroit Lions. On February 28, he underwent surgery to repair the ligaments.

=== 2024 season ===
Higbee began the 2024 season on the reserve/PUP list while recovering from knee surgery. He was activated on December 17. On December 22, 2024 in Higbee's first game back from injury, he had one reception that went for 11 yards and a touchdown in the fourth quarter that helped secure the Rams a 19–9 victory against the New York Jets at MetLife Stadium. Higbee finished the regular season with eight receptions for 66 yards and two TDs in his three starts. In the Rams' 27–9 NFC Wild Card victory over the Minnesota Vikings, Higbee led the team with five receptions for 58 yards (all in the first quarter), including a 23-yard reception from quarterback Matthew Stafford that set up L.A.'s first score of the game. However, Higbee suffered a chest injury later in the first half which forced him from the game and he did not return. Against Philadelphia in the NFC Divisional Playoff, Higbee caught seven passes for 54 yards, including a 4-yard TD in the first quarter of the Rams' 28–22 loss.

=== 2025 season ===
Higbee began the 2025 season as Los Angeles' starting tight end, recording 190 yards and two touchdowns while playing in nine of the Rams' first 10 games. After suffering an ankle injury in Week 11 against the Seattle Seahawks, he was placed on injured reserve on November 19, 2025. Ahead of the team's Week 18 matchup against the Arizona Cardinals, Higbee was activated on January 3, 2026. Returning to the starting lineup, Higbee caught five passes for a team-high 91 yards and a touchdown (all single-game highs for the season) in the Rams' 37–20 victory. Higbee finished his 10th season with the Rams catching 25 passes for 281 yards and three touchdowns. Though Higbee wasn't listed as a starting tight end in the NFC Wild Card Game against Carolina, he played the majority of the offensive snaps and had two receptions for 45 yards in the Rams' 34–31 victory over the Panthers. Against the Chicago Bears in an NFC Divisional Round Game, Higbee had one reception for 27 yards, which led to a second quarter field goal in the Rams' 20–17 overtime victory. Higbee started at tight end in the NFC Championship Game against the Seattle Seahawks and caught one pass for 12 yards in the Rams' 31–27 loss.

=== 2026 season ===
After comtemplating retirement, on March 5, 2026, Higbee signed a two-year contract extension with the Rams reportedly worth $8 million. Higbee had two receptions for 12 yards in the Rams' season-opening game played in Melbourne, Australia, but had one fumble which led to a field goal in San Francisco's 27-7 victory. Despite not being listed in the starting lineup in Week 3, Higbee recorded eight receptions for 62 yards and a touchdown (his most productive single-game totals since 2022) in the Rams' 30-26 loss to Denver on Sunday Night Football and surpassed 4,000 career receiving yards (4,023). Against Philadelphia in Week 4, Higbee had five receptions for 67 yards in the Rams' 24-20 victory. Also, Higbee's longest catch of the day, a 20-yard reception in the fourth quarter, was the 400th reception of his career. A week later, Higbee again caught five passes, this time for a season-high 83 yards in L.A.'s 37-34 overtime loss to the Buffalo Bills.

== Career statistics ==
Legend
	Won the Super Bowl
**Bold**	Career high

=== NFL ===
==== Regular season ====
Year	Team	Games		Receiving					Fumbles	
Year	Team	GP	GS	Rec	Yds	Avg	Lng	TD	Fum	Lost
2016	LAR	16	7	11	85	7.7	31	1	0	0
2017	LAR	16	16	25	295	11.8	38	1	0	0
2018	LAR	16	16	24	292	**12.2**	36	2	1	0
2019	LAR	15	15	69	**734**	10.6	33	3	0	0
2020	LAR	15	15	44	521	11.8	**44**	**5**	0	0
2021	LAR	15	15	61	560	9.2	37	**5**	1	0
2022	LAR	17	17	**72**	620	8.6	26	3	0	0
2023	LAR	15	15	47	495	10.5	33	2	0	0
2024	LAR	3	3	8	66	8.3	17	2	0	0
2025	LAR	10	8	25	281	11.2	24	3	0	0
2026	LAR	7	1	27	274	10.1	30	1	**2**	**2**
Career		145	128	413	4,223	10.2	44	28	4	2

==== Postseason ====
Year	Team	Games		Receiving					Fumbles	
Year	Team	GP	GS	Rec	Yds	Avg	Lng	TD	Fum	Lost
2017	LAR	1	1	1	11	11.0	11	0	0	0
2018	LAR	3	3	6	55	9.2	19	**1**	0	0
2020	LAR	2	2	3	9	3.0	4	0	0	0
2021	LAR	3	3	9	**115**	12.8	29	0	0	0
2023	LAR	1	1	0	0	0.0	0	0	0	0
2024	LAR	2	2	**12**	112	9.3	23	**1**	0	0
2025	LAR	3	1	4	84	**21.0**	**36**	0	0	0
Career		15	13	35	386	11.0	36	2	0	0

=== College ===
Year	Team	Class	Pos	G	Receiving			
Year	Team	Class	Pos	G	**Rec**	**Yds**	**Avg**	**TD**
2011	Western Kentucky	FR	WR	11	2	92	**46.0**	1
2013	Western Kentucky	SO	TE	5	13	169	13.0	1
2014	Western Kentucky	JR	TE	6	15	230	15.3	4
2015	Western Kentucky	SR	TE	9	**38**	**563**	14.8	**8**
**Career**				**31**	**68**	**1,054**	**15.5**	**14**

== Legal issues ==
On April 20, 2016, Higbee was charged with second-degree assault, alcohol intoxication in a public place and evading police, following an incident on April 10, which he assaulted a man outside of Tidball's night club in Bowling Green, Kentucky. He was identified and arrested after fleeing the scene. According to the report, Higbee stated he encountered Nawaf Alsaleh multiple times. The first encounter happened outside of Dublin's Pub, where Higbee stated Alsaleh kept rubbing his head on his and his girlfriend's face multiple times and ignored persisted warnings to stop. Higbee also stated Alsaleh was calling his friends telling them to come to their location to fight Higbee." He was asked by an officer how he understood what Alsaleh said since he spoke a language he did not understand, and Higbee responded that he "just knew." Once at the jail, Higbee stated to the arresting officer "that Alsaleh never tried to fight him or come after him as if he was going to harm him." Higbee just said that, "Alsaleh got into his and (his girlfriend's) personal space so he hit Alsaleh," according to the report. Multiple witnesses said Alsaleh had his hands down and two white males were seen arguing with him and yelling ethnic slurs before hitting him once. Following the assault, Higbee was quoted as saying "ISIS these nuts,” and “fuck you, go back to your country.” The victim, Nawaf Alsaleh, was found unconscious and unresponsive in the parking lot of the bar and was hospitalized with a brain hemorrhage and concussion.

On July 24, 2017, Higbee pleaded guilty to assault under extreme emotional disturbance in Warren Circuit Court. Judge Steve Wilson accepted a plea agreement where Higbee must complete a pre-trial diversion program, serve 250 hours of community service, and pay restitution to the victim. Alsaleh returned to Saudi Arabia, but was able to meet with Higbee in person, where Higbee apologized and shook his hand.
