= Darryl Henderson =

Australian rules footballer

Personal information
- Full name: Darryl Henderson
- Born: 15 July 1958 (age 68)
- Original team: Corowa-Rutherglen
- Height: 183 cm (6 ft 0 in)
- Weight: 83 kg (183 lb)

Playing career^{1}
Years	Club	Games (Goals)
1981–82	North Melbourne	11 (0)
1983	Sydney	3 (0)
Total		14 (0)
- ^{1} Playing statistics correct to the end of 1983.

Darryl Henderson (born 15 July 1958) is a former Australian rules football, who played with North Melbourne and Sydney in the Victorian Football League (VFL)
