= Eric Banks (American football) =

American football player (born 1998)

Profile
- Position: Defensive end

Personal information
- Born: January 30, 1998 (age 28); Memphis, Tennessee, U.S.
- Listed height: 6 ft 5 in (1.96 m)
- Listed weight: 274 lb (124 kg)

Career information
- High school: East (Memphis)
- College: UTSA (2016–2019)
- NFL draft: 2020: undrafted

Career history
- Los Angeles Rams (2020); Los Angeles Chargers (2021); Detroit Lions (2021); Arizona Cardinals (2022–2023); Tampa Bay Buccaneers (2024)

Career NFL statistics as of 2024
- Total tackles: 4
- Stats at Pro Football Reference

Eric Banks (born January 30, 1998) is an American professional football defensive end. He played college football for the UTSA Roadrunners.

== College career ==
Banks was a member of the UTSA Roadrunners for four seasons. He finished his collegiate career with 81 tackles, 20.5 tackles for loss, and 7.5 sacks with one fumble recovery and five forced fumbles over 48 games played.

== Professional career ==
Pre-draft measurables
Height	Weight
6 ft 5 in (1.96 m)	270 lb (122 kg)
Values from Pro Day

=== Los Angeles Rams ===
Banks was signed by the Los Angeles Rams as an undrafted free agent following the 2020 NFL draft on April 25, 2020. He initially made the Rams' 53-man roster out of training camp. Banks was waived from the active roster on October 10, 2020, and then resigned to the team's practice squad on October 13. He signed a reserve/futures contract with the Rams on January 18, 2021. Banks was waived by the Rams during final roster cuts on August 31, 2021.

=== Los Angeles Chargers ===
Banks was claimed off waivers by the Los Angeles Chargers on September 1, 2021. On September 30, Banks was released by the Chargers.

=== Detroit Lions ===
On October 1, 2021, Banks was claimed off waivers by the Detroit Lions. On October 28, Banks was waived by the Lions and re-signed to the practice squad. He signed a reserve/future contract with the Lions on January 10, 2022. On August 30, Banks was waived/injured by the Lions and placed on injured reserve. He was released on September 5.

=== Arizona Cardinals ===
On November 2, 2022, Banks was signed to the Arizona Cardinals practice squad. He was promoted to the active roster on January 7, 2023.

On August 29, 2023, Banks was released by the Cardinals and re-signed to the practice squad. He was released on November 10.

=== Tampa Bay Buccaneers ===
On January 30, 2024, Banks signed a reserve/future contract with the Tampa Bay Buccaneers. He was waived/injured on August 19.

On March 28, 2025, Banks re-signed with the Buccaneers on a one-year, $1 million contract. He was released on August 26 as part of final roster cuts.
