= 2022 Los Angeles Rams season =

86th season in franchise history, first losing season since 2016

- Owner: Stan Kroenke
- General manager: Les Snead
- Head coach: Sean McVay
- Offensive coordinator: Liam Coen
- Defensive coordinator: Raheem Morris
- Home stadium: SoFi Stadium

Results
- Record: 5–12
- Division place: 3rd NFC West
- Playoffs: Did not qualify
- All-Pros: LB Bobby Wagner (2nd team)
- Pro Bowlers: DT Aaron Donald; CB Jalen Ramsey (alternate)

Uniform
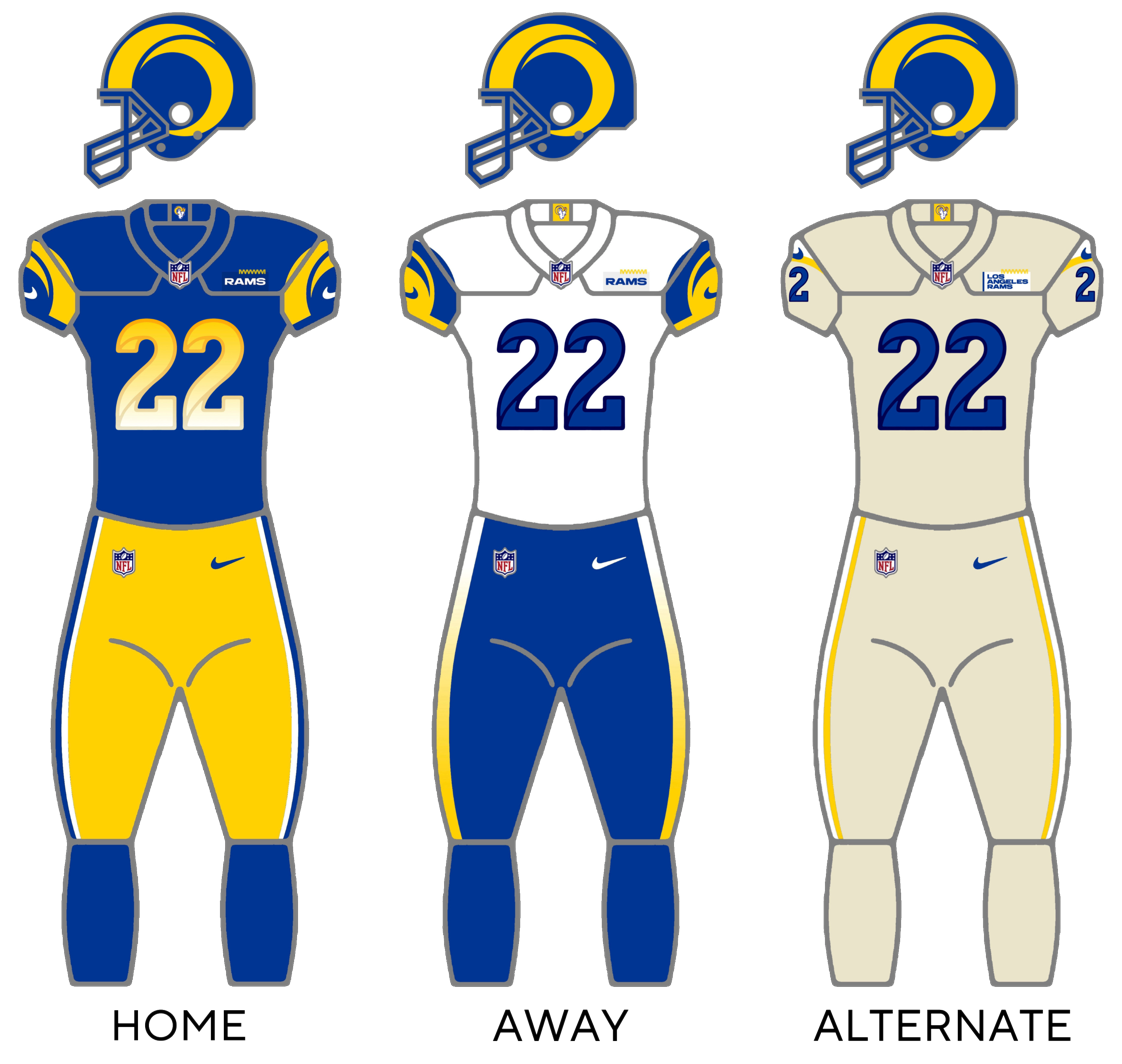

The 2022 season was the Los Angeles Rams' 85th in the National Football League (NFL), their 86th overall, their 56th in the Greater Los Angeles Area, the third playing their home games at SoFi Stadium, their sixth under head coach Sean McVay, and eleventh under general manager Les Snead.

The Rams came into the 2022 season as the defending Super Bowl champions for the first time since 2000, when the club was based in St. Louis. They attempted to become the first team to repeat as Super Bowl champions since the 2004 New England Patriots and the first NFC team to repeat since Rival 1993 Dallas Cowboys. However, after a 2–1 start, the Rams struggled mightily as the team regressed rapidly.

The Rams failed to match their 12–5 record from the previous season after a Week 10 loss to the Arizona Cardinals. After their Week 13 loss to the Seattle Seahawks, the Rams secured their first losing season since 2016 (and thus their first losing season in the Sean McVay era). Following their Week 15 loss to the Green Bay Packers, they were eliminated from playoff contention for the first time since 2019. A Week 17 loss to the crosstown Los Angeles Chargers marked the Rams 11th loss, eclipsing the 1999 Denver Broncos for most losses by a defending Super Bowl champion. Following an overtime loss to the Seattle Seahawks in their final game of the season, they failed to match the .333 winning percentage the 3–6 San Francisco 49ers recorded in the strike-shortened 1982 season. The Rams' .294 percentage is the worst-ever record by any defending NFL or AFL champion. They were the first defending Super Bowl champion to finish with a losing record since the 2003 Tampa Bay Buccaneers, and the first defending Super Bowl champion to miss the playoffs since the 2016 Denver Broncos. To add to all those struggles, the Rams went 1–7 on the road for the first time since 2011, when the team was still based in St. Louis. This was the Rams' only season from 2020 to 2024 not making the playoffs, as well as their only losing season from 2017 to 2025.

The Rams had dealt with notable key injuries to most of their starters including quarterback Matthew Stafford and All-Pros Cooper Kupp and Aaron Donald, all of whom had played prominent roles in the team's Super Bowl run of the previous season. The Rams finished the season with the third most players on injured reserve behind the Tennessee Titans and Denver Broncos. Through each of their first eleven games of the season alone, the Rams have started 11 different offensive line combinations. No other team since the 1970 AFL–NFL merger has accomplished this feat.

== Offseason ==
=== Coaching changes ===
- The Minnesota Vikings hired Rams offensive coordinator Kevin O'Connell as their new head coach February 16, 2022. The following day, Chris O'Hara, an offensive assistant with the Rams in 2021, was hired to join O'Connell's staff as quarterbacks coach. On February 21, 2022, Wes Phillips was hired by the Vikings as offensive coordinator. Phillips had served as tight ends coach for McVay in two stints over five seasons with Washington (2014–2016) and Los Angeles (2019–2021), and in 2021 had added the title of pass game coordinator.
- The Denver Broncos named Rams secondary coach/passing game coordinator Ejiro Evero as defensive coordinator for new head coach Nathaniel Hackett's staff. Also hired from the Rams were assistant special teams coach Dwayne Stukes as special teams coordinator and assistant defensive line coach Marcus Dixon as defensive line coach on February 17, 2022.
- Liam Coen was hired as offensive coordinator, succeeding Kevin O'Connell. Coen had served as an assistant wide receivers and quarterbacks coach with the Rams from 2018 to 2020 before leaving to serve as offensive coordinator at the University of Kentucky.
- Thomas Brown, the Rams' running backs coach for the previous two seasons, was reassigned to take over for Phillips as tight ends coach, while retaining his position as assistant head coach.
- Fourth-year staffer Zac Robinson was given the dual titles of pass game coordinator/quarterbacks coach after spending the previous season as assistant quarterbacks coach.
- Lance Schulters, a former safety who played 10 years in the NFL primarily with the San Francisco 49ers and Tennessee Titans, was promoted to defensive assistant after spending 2021 on the Rams staff as a coaching fellow.
- Having coached linebackers over the previous five seasons with the Rams, Chris Shula was named pass game coordinator/defensive backs coach.
- Other internal promotions included Thad Bogardus being elevated to outside linebackers coach after spending 2021 as assistant linebackers coach, while Jonathan Cooley became defensive backs coach after serving as assistant secondary coach the previous season.
- Ra'Shaad Samples was hired to succeed Thomas Brown as Rams running backs coach after having held the same position at SMU.
- Greg Olson, who had served as Rams quarterbacks coach during Sean McVay's first season in 2017, returned to the club as a senior offensive assistant after spending the four previous seasons as offensive coordinator with the Oakland/Las Vegas Raiders. Olson had also been offensive coordinator for the then-St. Louis Rams in 2006 and 2007.
- During preseason, Sean McVay announced that Jay Gruden, who had been head coach of the Washington Redskins during McVay's tenure there, had been hired as an offensive consultant and would work remotely for the team.

== Draft ==
2022 Los Angeles Rams draft
Round	Selection	Player	Position	College	Notes
1	32	Traded to Detroit (Note: The Rams traded QB Jared Goff, a first-round selection (32nd overall), a 2021 third-round selection and a 2023 first-round selection to the Detroit Lions in exchange for QB Matthew Stafford.)			
2	64	Traded to Denver (Note: The Rams traded their second- and third-round selections (64th and 96th overall) to the Denver Broncos in exchange for LB Von Miller.)			
3	96	Traded to Denver			
3	104	Logan Bruss	OG	Wisconsin	2020 Resolution JC-2A selection
4	137	Traded to Houston (Note: The Rams traded WR Brandin Cooks and a fourth-round selection (137th overall) to the Houston Texans in exchange for a 2020 second-round selection.)			
4	142	Cobie Durant	CB	South Carolina State	Compensatory pick
5	164	Kyren Williams	RB	Notre Dame	from New England via Las Vegas (Note: The Rams traded fifth- and seventh-round selections (175th and 238th overall) to the Las Vegas Raiders in exchange for a fifth-round selection (164th overall).)
5	175	Traded to Las Vegas			
6	210	Traded to New England (Note: The Rams traded a sixth-round selection (210th overall) and a 2023 fourth-round selection to the New England Patriots in exchange for RB Sony Michel.)			
6	211	Quentin Lake	S	UCLA	
6	212	Derion Kendrick	CB	Georgia	
6	218	Traded to the Tampa Bay Buccaneers (Note: The Rams traded a sixth-round selection (218th overall) to Tampa Bay in exchange for two seventh-round selections (235th and 261st overall).)			
7	235	Daniel Hardy	LB	Montana State	from Baltimore via Jacksonville and Tampa Bay
7	238	Traded to Las Vegas			from Miami (Note: The Rams traded CB Aqib Talib and a 2020 fifth-round selection to the Miami Dolphins in exchange for a seventh-round selection (238th overall).)
7	253	Russ Yeast	S	Kansas State	
7	261	A. J. Arcuri	OT	Michigan State	from Tampa Bay

Draft trades

2022 Los Angeles Rams undrafted free agents
Name	Position	College	Ref.
Roger Carter	TE	Georgia State	
T. J. Carter	CB	TCU	
Cameron Dicker	K, P	Texas	
Elijah García	DT	Rice	
Jake Hummel	LB	Iowa State	
Dan Isom	S	Washington State	
Duron Lowe	CB	Liberty	
Lance McCutcheon	WR	Montana State	
Jairon McVea	S	Baylor	
Dion Novil	DT	North Texas	
Jamal Pettigrew	TE	McNeese State	
Jack Snyder	G	San Jose State	
Brayden Thomas	LB	North Dakota State	
Keir Thomas	LB	Florida State	
Benton Whitley	LB	Holy Cross	
Caesar Williams	CB	Wisconsin	

== Staff ==
2022 Los Angeles Rams staff
Front office: Owner/CEO – Stan Kroenke; COO/executive vice president of football operations – Kevin Demoff; General manager – Les Snead; Vice president of football administration – Tony Pastoors; Director of football operations – Sophie Harlan; Senior personnel executive – Brian Xanders; Senior personnel advisor – Taylor Morton; Director of scouting strategy – James Gladstone; Assistant director of college scouting – Ted Monago; Director of pro scouting – John McKay; Director of draft management – J. W. Jordan; Director of football affairs – Jacques McClendon; Scouting consultant - Ray Farmer; Football analyst – Andy Benoit; Head coaches: Head coach – Sean McVay; Assistant head coach/tight ends – Thomas Brown; Offensive coaches: Offensive coordinator – Liam Coen; Pass game coordinator/quarterbacks – Zac Robinson; Running backs – Ra'Shaad Samples; Wide receivers – Eric Yarber; Offensive line – Kevin Carberry; Senior offensive assistant – Greg Olson; Offensive assistant – Nick Jones; Offensive assistant – Zak Kromer; Offensive assistant – Jake Peetz; Offensive consultant – Jay Gruden; Coaching fellow – Kenneth Black	Defensive coaches: Defensive coordinator – Raheem Morris; Defensive line/run game coordinator – Eric Henderson; Assistant defensive line – Skyler Jones; Outside linebackers – Thad Bogardus; Inside linebackers – Chris Beake; Defensive backs – Jonathan Cooley; Pass game coordinator/defensive backs – Chris Shula; Defensive assistant – Lance Schulters; Special teams coaches: Special teams coordinator – Joe DeCamillis; Special teams assistant – Jeremy Springer; Strength and conditioning: Director of strength training and performance – Justin Lovett; Assistant strength and conditioning – Fernando Noriega; Assistant strength and conditioning – Dustin Woods

== Final roster ==
2022 Los Angeles Rams roster
Quarterbacks (QB): 17 Baker Mayfield; 16 Bryce Perkins; 13 John Wolford; Running backs (RB): 3 Cam Akers; 41 Malcolm Brown; 30 Ronnie Rivers; 23 Kyren Williams; Wide receivers (WR): 15 Tutu Atwell; 12 Van Jefferson; 82 Lance McCutcheon; 19 Brandon Powell; 18 Ben Skowronek; 81 Austin Trammell; Tight ends (TE): 89 Tyler Higbee; 88 Brycen Hopkins	Offensive linemen (OL): 63 Oday Aboushi G; 55 Brian Allen C; 61 A. J. Arcuri T; 67 Chandler Brewer T; 79 Rob Havenstein T; 68 Ty Nsekhe T; 65 Coleman Shelton G; 64 Matt Skura C; 57 Zachary Thomas T; Defensive linemen (DL): 95 Bobby Brown III NT; 90 Earnest Brown IV DE; 93 Marquise Copeland DE; 99 Aaron Donald DT; 91 Greg Gaines NT; 52 Larrell Murchison DE; 92 Jonah Williams NT	Linebackers (LB): 54 Leonard Floyd OLB; 44 Daniel Hardy OLB; 97 Michael Hoecht OLB; 32 Travin Howard ILB; 53 Ernest Jones ILB; 56 Christian Rozeboom ILB; 96 Keir Thomas OLB; 45 Bobby Wagner ILB; Defensive backs (DB): 14 Cobie Durant CB; 2 Troy Hill CB; 38 Shaun Jolly CB; 6 Derion Kendrick CB; 37 Quentin Lake FS; 22 David Long CB; 5 Jalen Ramsey CB; 24 Taylor Rapp SS; 31 Robert Rochell CB; 33 Nick Scott FS; 21 Russ Yeast FS; Special teams (ST): 11 Riley Dixon P; 8 Matt Gay K; 42 Matthew Orzech LS	Practice squad: 49 Roger Carter TE; 20 T. J. Carter SS; 98 T. J. Carter DE; -- Case Cookus QB; 59 Khalil Davis NT; 62 Jeremiah Kolone G; 26 Richard LeCounte FS; 83 Lance Lenoir WR; 4 Brock Miller P; 46 Jared Pinkney TE; 66 Max Pircher T (IPP); 84 Jaquarii Roberson WR; 86 Jerreth Sterns WR; 40 Brayden Thomas OLB; 50 Cole Toner C; 51 Zach VanValkenburg OLB; Reserve: 72 Tremayne Anchrum G (IR); 60 Logan Bruss G (IR); 73 David Edwards G (IR/DFR); -- Jordan Fuller SS (IR); 43 Jake Gervase ILB (IR); 36 Grant Haley CB (IR); 87 Jacob Harris WR (IR); 35 Jake Hummel ILB (IR); 77 Alaric Jackson T (IR); -- J. J. Koski WR (IR); 10 Cooper Kupp WR (IR); 70 Joseph Noteboom T (IR); 1 Allen Robinson WR (IR); 94 A'Shawn Robinson DE (IR); 9 Matthew Stafford QB (IR); Rookies in italics 53 active, 15 reserve, 15 practice squad (1 exempt)

== Preseason ==
The Rams' preseason opponents were announced May 12, 2022 along with the release of the NFL's regular season schedule, with exact dates and times announced eleven days later.

Week	Date	Opponent	Result	Record	Venue	Recap
1	August 13	at Los Angeles Chargers	W 29–22	1–0	SoFi Stadium	Recap
2	August 19	Houston Texans	L 20–24	1–1	SoFi Stadium	Recap
3	August 27	at Cincinnati Bengals	L 7–16	1–2	Paycor Stadium	Recap

== Regular season ==
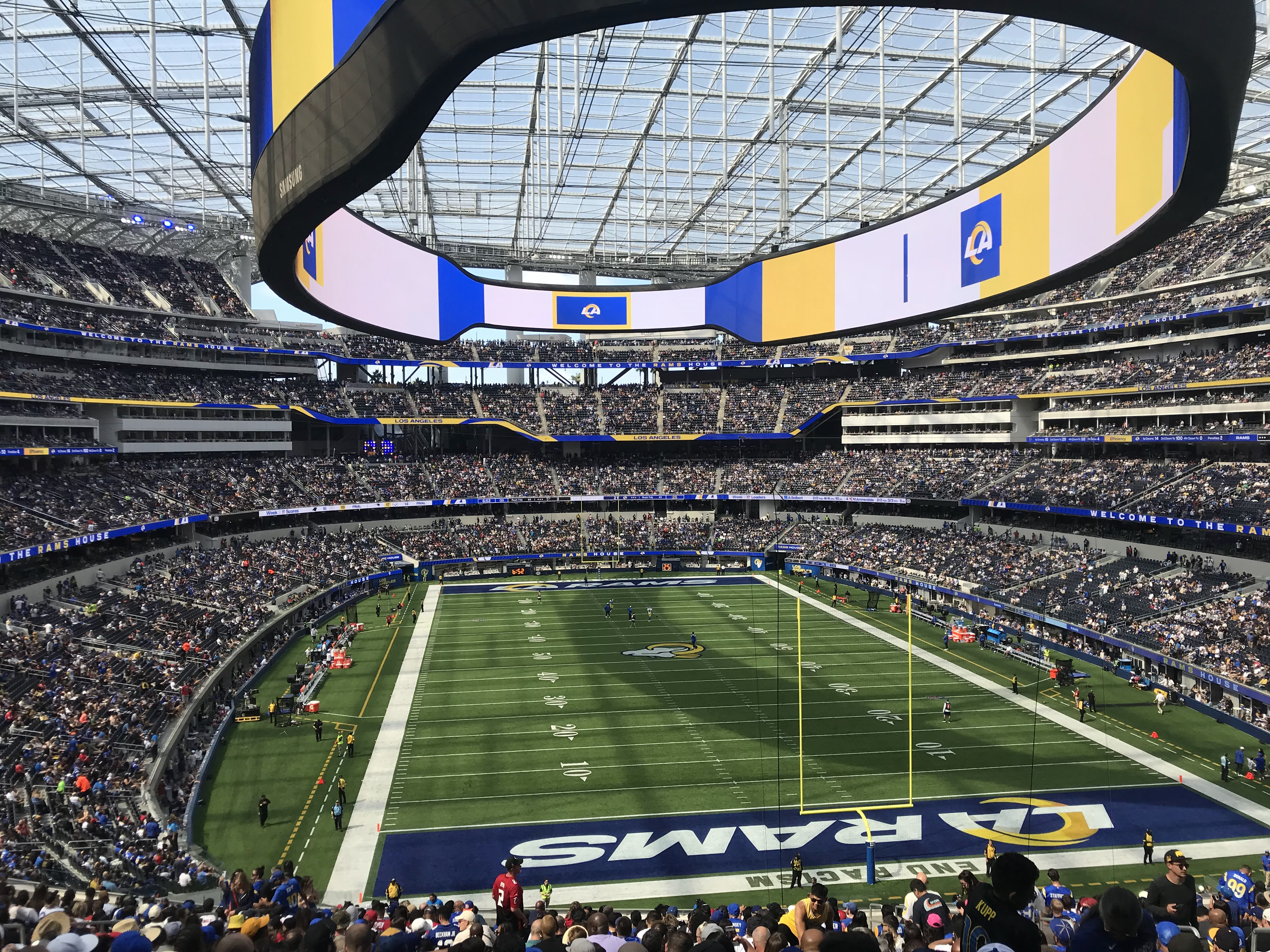
The Rams host the Atlanta Falcons on September 18, 2022

=== Schedule ===
As the defending Super Bowl champions, the Rams earned the right to host the NFL Kickoff Game against the Buffalo Bills at SoFi Stadium. This was also the first season in which the NFC teams played nine regular season home games as per the new seventeen game schedule. By also playing an away game against the Chargers, in addition to not being the designated home team for any neutral site games, the 2022 Rams became the first team in modern NFL history to play ten regular season games in their home stadium. (There are some teams who did this early in NFL history; for example, the 1921 Chicago Staleys (now Bears) played ten consecutive games in Cubs Park (now Wrigley Field) from October 16 to December 18.

On May 10, the NFL announced that the Rams would host the Denver Broncos as part of a Christmas Day triple-header on December 25. The game kicked off at 1:30 p.m. PST, and was televised by CBS and Nickelodeon.

The remainder of the Rams' 2022 schedule was announced on May 12.

Week	Date	Opponent	Result	Record	Venue	Recap
1	September 8	Buffalo Bills	**L** 10–31	0–1	SoFi Stadium	Recap
2	September 18	Atlanta Falcons	**W** 31–27	1–1	SoFi Stadium	Recap
3	September 25	at **Arizona Cardinals**	**W** 20–12	2–1	State Farm Stadium	Recap
4	October 3	at **San Francisco 49ers**	**L** 9–24	2–2	Levi's Stadium	Recap
5	October 9	Dallas Cowboys	**L** 10–22	2–3	SoFi Stadium	Recap
6	October 16	Carolina Panthers	**W** 24–10	3–3	SoFi Stadium	Recap
7	Bye					
8	October 30	**San Francisco 49ers**	**L** 14–31	3–4	SoFi Stadium	Recap
9	November 6	at Tampa Bay Buccaneers	**L** 13–16	3–5	Raymond James Stadium	Recap
10	November 13	**Arizona Cardinals**	**L** 17–27	3–6	SoFi Stadium	Recap
11	November 20	at New Orleans Saints	**L** 20–27	3–7	Caesars Superdome	Recap
12	November 27	at Kansas City Chiefs	**L** 10–26	3–8	Arrowhead Stadium	Recap
13	December 4	**Seattle Seahawks**	**L** 23–27	3–9	SoFi Stadium	Recap
14	December 8	Las Vegas Raiders	**W** 17–16	4–9	SoFi Stadium	Recap
15	December 19	at Green Bay Packers	**L** 12–24	4–10	Lambeau Field	Recap
16	December 25	Denver Broncos	**W** 51–14	5–10	SoFi Stadium	Recap
17	January 1	at Los Angeles Chargers	**L** 10–31	5–11	SoFi Stadium	Recap
18	January 8	at **Seattle Seahawks**	**L** 16–19 (OT)	5–12	Lumen Field	Recap

Note: Intra-division opponents are in bold text.

=== Game summaries ===
==== Week 1: vs. Buffalo Bills ====
NFL Kickoff Game

Week 1: Buffalo Bills at Los Angeles Rams – Game summary

Quarter	1	2	3	4	Total
**Bills**	7	3	7	14	**31**
Rams	0	10	0	0	**10**

at SoFi Stadium, Inglewood, California

- Date: September 8
- Game time: 5:20 p.m. PDT
- Game weather: Cloudy, 88 °F (31 °C)
- Game attendance: 73,846
- Referee: Carl Cheffers
- TV announcers (NBC): Mike Tirico, Cris Collinsworth and Melissa Stark
- Recap, Game Book

Game information

**First quarter**

- BUF – Gabe Davis 26-yard pass from Josh Allen (Tyler Bass kick), 9:56. Bills 7–0. **Drive: 9 plays, 75 yards, 5:04.**

**Second quarter**

- BUF – Tyler Bass 41-yard field goal, 8:48. Bills 10–0. **Drive: 8 plays, 45 yards, 4:07.**
- LAR – Cooper Kupp 4-yard pass from Matthew Stafford (Matt Gay kick), 3:00. Bills 10–7. **Drive: 11 plays, 60 yards, 5:48.**
- LAR – Matt Gay 57-yard field goal, 0:00. Tied 10–10. **Drive: 8 plays, 6 yards, 1:53.**

**Third quarter**

- BUF – Isaiah McKenzie 7-yard pass from Josh Allen (Tyler Bass kick), 7:59. Bills 17–10. **Drive: 8 plays, 58 yards, 5:03.**

**Fourth quarter**

- BUF – Josh Allen 4-yard run (Tyler Bass kick), 13:27. Bills 24–10. **Drive: 13 plays, 89 yards, 6:44.**
- BUF – Stefon Diggs 53-yard pass from Josh Allen (Tyler Bass kick), 9:25. Bills 31–10. **Drive: 3 plays, 59 yards, 1:36.**

**Top passers**

- BUF – Josh Allen – 26/31, 297 yards, 3 TD, 2 INT
- LAR – Matthew Stafford – 29/41, 240 yards, TD, 3 INT

**Top rushers**

- BUF – Josh Allen – 10 rushes, 56 yards, TD
- LAR – Darrell Henderson – 13 rushes, 47 yards

**Top receivers**

- BUF – Stefon Diggs – 8 receptions, 122 yards, TD
- LAR – Cooper Kupp – 13 receptions, 128 yards, TD

Starting the 2022 campaign at home on Thursday Night Football, the Rams were shut out in the second half as Sean McVay lost a season opener for the first time as head coach. After falling behind by 10 points in the second quarter, Los Angeles rallied back on a 4-yard touchdown pass from quarterback Matthew Stafford to wide receiver Cooper Kupp, while kicker Matt Gay converted a 57-yard field goal at the end of the second quarter to tie the game at 10-10. Stafford, who surpassed 50,000 career passing yards during the game, completed 29 of 41 passes for 240 yards but threw three interceptions and was sacked seven times. Kupp, the NFL's leading receiver in 2021, caught 13 passes for 128 yards and a score to lead the Rams offense. Defensively, cornerback Jalen Ramsey led Los Angeles with six tackles but was victimized on a 53-yard touchdown pass from Bills quarterback Josh Allen to wide receiver Stefon Diggs in the fourth quarter, while linebacker Bobby Wagner had five tackles with two assists and a sack in his debut with the Rams.

==== Week 2: vs. Atlanta Falcons ====
Week 2: Atlanta Falcons at Los Angeles Rams – Game summary

Quarter	1	2	3	4	Total
Falcons	0	3	7	17	**27**
**Rams**	7	14	7	3	**31**

at SoFi Stadium, Inglewood, California

- Date: September 18
- Game time: 1:05 p.m. PDT
- Game weather: Cloudy, 74 °F (23 °C)
- Game attendance: 71,802
- Referee: Clay Martin
- TV announcers (Fox): Kevin Kugler, Mark Sanchez and Laura Okmin
- Recap, Game Book

Game information

**First quarter**

- LAR – Allen Robinson 1-yard pass from Matthew Stafford (Matt Gay kick), 1:44. Rams 7–0. **Drive: 9 plays, 66 yards, 5:10.**

**Second quarter**

- LAR – Darrell Henderson 8-yard run (Matt Gay kick), 9:30. Rams 14–0. **Drive: 8 plays, 50 yards, 4:41.**
- ATL – Younghoe Koo 26-yard field goal, 2:44. Rams 14–3. **Drive: 11 plays, 67 yards, 6:46.**
- LAR – Cooper Kupp 3-yard pass from Matthew Stafford (Matt Gay kick), 0:14. Rams 21–3. **Drive: 3 plays, 9 yards, 0:14.**

**Third quarter**

- LAR – Cooper Kupp 10-yard pass from Matthew Stafford (Matt Gay kick), 9:22. Rams 28–3. **Drive: 10 plays, 75 yards, 5:38.**
- ATL – Drake London 4-yard pass from Marcus Mariota (Younghoe Koo kick), 3:20. Rams 28–10. **Drive: 5 plays, 20 yards, 3:03.**

**Fourth quarter**

- LAR – Matt Gay 20-yard field goal, 12:13. Rams 31–10. **Drive: 13 plays, 78 yards, 6:07.**
- ATL – Olamide Zaccheaus 11-yard pass from Marcus Mariota (Younghoe Koo kick), 8:14. Rams 31–17. **Drive: 8 plays, 72 yards, 3:59.**
- ATL – Lorenzo Carter 26-yard return of blocked punt (Marcus Mariota–Drake London pass), 4:57. Rams 31–25.
- ATL – Brandon Powell OB in end zone, forced by DeAundre Alford, for a Safety, 0:06. Rams 31–27.

**Top passers**

- ATL – Marcus Mariota – 17/26, 196 yards, 2 TD, 2 INT
- LAR – Matthew Stafford – 27/36, 272 yards, 3 TD, 2 INT

**Top rushers**

- ATL – Cordarrelle Patterson – 10 rushes, 41 yards
- LAT – Darrell Henderson – 10 rushes, 47 yards, TD

**Top receivers**

- ATL – Drake London – 8 receptions, 86 yards, TD
- LAR – Cooper Kupp – 11 receptions, 108 yards, 2 TD

The Rams built a commanding 28–3 lead in the third quarter, then had to withstand a fourth quarter rally by Atlanta to gain their first victory of the season. Quarterback Matthew Stafford connected with wide receiver Allen Robinson for a 1-yard touchdown late in the first quarter, then threw two more TD passes to wide receiver Cooper Kupp in the second (3 yards) and third quarters (10 yards). Running back Darrell Henderson led the team with 47 rushing yards on 10 attempts and scored on an 8-yard run in the second period. Rookie cornerback Cobie Durant returned an interception 51 yards late in the second quarter to set up a Rams touchdown and added two tackles including a sack of Falcons quarterback Marcus Mariota. However, Mariota bounced back to throw two touchdown passes while Atlanta also scored after blocking Rams punter Riley Dixon to close to within 31–25. But Rams cornerback Jalen Ramsey came up with a critical interception at the goal line with just over a minute remaining and L.A. was able to escape. Kupp had 11 receptions for 108 yards and two scores while Stafford passed for 272 yards and three TDs along with two interceptions. On defense, linebacker Ernest Jones had a team-high 12 tackles while fellow linebacker Bobby Wagner added seven tackles and a sack in the win for Los Angeles.

==== Week 3: at Arizona Cardinals ====
Week 3: Los Angeles Rams at Arizona Cardinals – Game summary

Quarter	1	2	3	4	Total
**Rams**	10	3	7	0	**20**
Cardinals	0	6	3	3	**12**

at State Farm Stadium, Glendale, Arizona

- Date: September 25
- Game time: 1:25 p.m. MST & PDT
- Game weather: None (retractable roof closed)
- Game attendance: 63,243
- Referee: Adrian Hill
- TV announcers (Fox): Kevin Kugler, Mark Sanchez and Laura Okmin
- Recap, Game Book

Game information

**First quarter**

- LAR – Matt Gay 22-yard field goal, 9:45. Rams 3–0. **Drive: 8 plays, 31 yards, 3:49.**
- LAR – Cooper Kupp 20-yard run (Matt Gay kick), 4:00. Rams 10–0. **Drive: 7 plays, 58 yards, 4:50.**

**Second quarter**

- LAR – Matt Gay 40-yard field goal, 13:23. Rams 13–0. **Drive: 6 plays, 58 yards, 3:08.**
- ARI – Matt Prater 23-yard field goal, 1:51. Rams 13–3. **Drive: 19 plays, 65 yards, 9:30.**
- ARI – Matt Prater 43-yard field goal, 0:02. Rams 13–6. **Drive: 8 plays, 47 yards, 0:46.**

**Third quarter**

- ARI – Matt Prater 49-yard field goal, 5:10. Rams 13–9. **Drive: 16 plays, 58 yards, 7:47.**
- LAR – Cam Akers 14-yard run (Matt Gay kick), 1:00. Rams 20–9. **Drive: 8 plays, 75 yards, 4:10.**

**Fourth quarter**

- ARI – Matt Prater 31-yard field goal, 1:07. Rams 20–12. **Drive: 17 plays, 84 yards, 5:32.**

**Top passers**

- LAR – Matthew Stafford – 18/25, 249 yards
- ARI – Kyler Murray – 37/58, 314 yards

**Top rushers**

- LAR – Cam Akers – 12 rushes, 61 yards, TD
- ARI – James Conner – 13 rushes, 39 yards

**Top receivers**

- LAR – Ben Skowronek – 4 receptions, 66 yards
- ARI – Marquise Brown – 14 receptions, 140 yards

With a strong defensive performance that kept the Cardinals offense out of the end zone for the entire game, the Rams picked up their first (and ultimately only) NFC West victory of the season. The win was the Rams' eighth straight over Arizona at State Farm Stadium, a streak that started in 2015. Kicker Matt Gay converted field goals of 22 and 40 yards while wide receiver Cooper Kupp ran 20 yards on a jet sweep in the second quarter to score the first rushing touchdown of his NFL career as Los Angeles built a 13–0 lead. Running back Cam Akers rushed for a game-high 61 yards on 12 carries, including a 14-yard touchdown run to give the Rams a 20–9 advantage late in the third quarter. However, Akers was stripped of the ball at the goal line as Los Angeles was poised to go up by three scores midway through fourth quarter. Rookie cornerback Derion Kendrick and veteran linebacker Bobby Wagner shared the team lead in tackles with nine as they helped to limit the Cardinals to just four field goals by kicker Matt Prater. Defensive tackle Aaron Donald added six total tackles, including a sack of Arizona quarterback Kyler Murray for minus-15 yards in the first quarter that was the 100th sack of the perennial All-Pro's NFL career. Rams quarterback Matthew Stafford threw for 249 yards but did not throw a touchdown pass in a game for the first time since coming to Los Angeles.

==== Week 4: at San Francisco 49ers ====
Week 4: Los Angeles Rams at San Francisco 49ers – Game summary

Quarter	1	2	3	4	Total
Rams	3	3	3	0	**9**
**49ers**	7	7	0	10	**24**

at Levi's Stadium, Santa Clara, California

- Date: October 3
- Game time: 5:15 p.m. PDT
- Game weather: Clear, 73 °F (23 °C)
- Game attendance: 71,597
- Referee: Brad Allen
- TV announcers (KABC-TV/ESPN): Joe Buck, Troy Aikman and Lisa Salters
- Recap, Game Book

Game information

**First quarter**

- LAR – Matt Gay 39-yard field goal, 6:48. Rams 3–0. **Drive: 14 plays, 54 yards, 8:12.**
- SF – Jeff Wilson Jr. 32-yard run (Robbie Gould kick), 2:46. 49ers 7–3. **Drive: 8 plays, 75 yards, 4:02.**

**Second quarter**

- LAR – Matt Gay 29-yard field goal, 6:26. 49ers 7–6. **Drive: 10 plays, 54 yards, 5:08.**
- SF – Deebo Samuel 57-yard pass from Jimmy Garoppolo (Robbie Gould kick), 3:01. 49ers 14–6. **Drive: 6 plays, 75 yards, 3:36.**

**Third quarter**

- LAR – Matt Gay 26-yard field goal, 4:28. 49ers 14–9. **Drive: 16 plays, 75 yards, 7:43.**

**Fourth quarter**

- SF – Robbie Gould 25-yard field goal, 14:54. 49ers 17–9. **Drive: 9 plays, 67 yards, 4:32.**
- SF – Talanoa Hufanga 52-yard interception return (Robbie Gould kick), 6:27. 49ers 24–9.

**Top passers**

- LAR – Matthew Stafford – 32/48, 254 yards, INT
- SF – Jimmy Garoppolo – 16/27, 239 yards, TD

**Top rushers**

- LAR – Darrell Henderson Jr. – 7 rushes, 27 yards
- SF – Jeff Wilson Jr. – 18 rushes, 74 yards, TD

**Top receivers**

- LAR – Cooper Kupp – 14 receptions, 122 yards
- SF – Deebo Samuel – 6 receptions, 115 yards, TD

The host 49ers racked up seven sacks and dominated the line of scrimmage on both sides of the ball to continue their mastery of the Rams in the regular season with their seventh straight victory. Meeting Los Angeles for the first time since they lost the 2021 NFC Championship Game, the 49ers gave up an early field goal to Rams kicker Matt Gay but then seized the lead on a 32-yard touchdown run by running back Jeff Wilson and extended their advantage to 14–6 when San Francisco quarterback Jimmy Garoppolo connected with wide receiver Deebo Samuel on a 57-yard catch-and-run late in the second quarter. Rams quarterback Matthew Stafford completed 32 of 48 passes for 254 yards but was sacked seven times and was constantly harassed by 49ers defensive end Nick Bosa and linebacker Samson Ebukam (a former Ram), both of whom had two sacks each. Stafford also threw a fourth quarter interception that was returned by San Francisco strong safety Talanoa Hufanga 52 yards for a touchdown and the game's final points. Wide receiver Cooper Kupp totaled a career-high 14 receptions (for 122 yards) but was held out of the end zone. Linebacker Bobby Wagner led the Rams with 10 tackles and was notable for tackling a protester who ran onto the field late in the second quarter.

==== Week 5: vs. Dallas Cowboys ====
Week 5: Dallas Cowboys at Los Angeles Rams – Game summary

Quarter	1	2	3	4	Total
**Cowboys**	9	7	3	3	**22**
Rams	3	7	0	0	**10**

at SoFi Stadium, Inglewood, California

- Date: October 9
- Game time: 1:25 p.m. PDT
- Game weather: Sunny, 74 °F (23 °C)
- Game attendance: 74,154
- Referee: Bill Vinovich
- TV announcers (Fox): Kevin Burkhardt, Greg Olsen, Erin Andrews and Tom Rinaldi
- Recap, Game Book

Game information

**First quarter**

- DAL – DeMarcus Lawrence 19-yard fumble return (run failed), 13:27. Cowboys 6–0.
- DAL – Brett Maher 33-yard field goal, 8:43. Cowboys 9–0. **Drive: 4 plays, 5 yards, 0:51.**
- LAR – Matt Gay 29-yard field goal, 5:22. Cowboys 9–3. **Drive: 7 plays, 65 yards, 3:21.**

**Second quarter**

- LAR – Cooper Kupp 75-yard pass from Matthew Stafford (Matt Gay kick), 9:31. Rams 10–9. **Drive: 3 plays, 83 yards, 1:29.**
- DAL – Tony Pollard 57-yard run (Brett Maher kick), 7:59. Cowboys 16–10. **Drive: 3 plays, 75 yards, 1:32.**

**Third quarter**

- DAL – Brett Maher 40-yard field goal, 8:11. Cowboys 19–10. **Drive: 13 plays, 53 yards, 6:49.**

**Fourth quarter**

- DAL – Brett Maher 36-yard field goal, 5:32. Cowboys 22–10. **Drive: 9 plays, 35 yards, 5:37.**

**Top passers**

- DAL – Cooper Rush – 10/16, 102 yards
- LAR – Matthew Stafford – 28/42, 308 yards, TD, INT

**Top rushers**

- DAL – Tony Pollard – 8 rushes, 86 yards, TD
- LAR – Cam Akers – 13 rushes, 33 yards

**Top receivers**

- DAL – CeeDee Lamb – 5 receptions, 53 yards
- LAR – Cooper Kupp – 7 receptions, 125 yards, TD

A fumble and a blocked punt on the game's first two possessions put the Rams into a hole that they could not recover from in their second straight defeat. Quarterback Matthew Stafford was sacked on the game's third play by Cowboys defensive end Dorance Armstrong, who stripped Stafford of the ball which was then scooped up by defensive end DeMarcus Lawrence and returned 19 yards for a touchdown. On the Rams' next possession, Armstrong came up with a second big play, blocking a punt by Riley Dixon and returning it 14 yards down to the L.A. 20 which led to a field goal by Brett Maher and a 9–0 lead. The Rams answered with a 29-yard field goal by kicker Matt Gay that was set up by a 54-yard deep pass from Stafford to wide receiver Tutu Atwell. In the second quarter, Los Angeles took a 10–9 lead as wide receiver Cooper Kupp took a Stafford pass and outran Dallas cornerback Trevon Diggs for a 75-yard touchdown, the longest reception of Kupp's career. But the Cowboys responded on their next drive as running back Tony Pollard scored on a 57-yard touchdown to retake the lead which Dallas would never relinquish. Maher added field goals in the third and fourth quarters as the Cowboys extended their advantage. Stafford passed for 308 yards and was sacked five times (Dallas outside linebacker Micah Parsons had two) while the Rams running game sputtered with only 38 yards on 15 attempts. On defense for the Rams, defensive tackle Aaron Donald had six total tackles including two sacks in the loss.

==== Week 6: vs. Carolina Panthers ====
Week 6: Carolina Panthers at Los Angeles Rams – Game summary

Quarter	1	2	3	4	Total
Panthers	3	7	0	0	**10**
**Rams**	0	7	10	7	**24**

at SoFi Stadium, Inglewood, California

- Date: October 16
- Game time: 1:05 p.m. PDT
- Game weather: Cloudy, 72 °F (22 °C)
- Game attendance: 71,482
- Referee: Tra Blake
- TV announcers (Fox): Kevin Kugler, Mark Sanchez and Laura Okmin
- Recap, Game Book

Game information

**First quarter**

- CAR – Eddy Piñeiro 42-yard field goal, 8:38. Panthers 3–0. **Drive: 12 plays, 51 yards, 6:22.**

**Second quarter**

- LAR – Allen Robinson 5-yard pass from Matthew Stafford (Matt Gay kick), 3:34. Rams 7–3. **Drive: 13 plays, 73 yards, 7:58.**
- CAR – Donte Jackson 30-yard interception return (Eddy Piñeiro kick), 1:58. Panthers 10–7.

**Third quarter**

- LAR – Matt Gay 21-yard field goal, 4:37. Tied 10–10. **Drive: 12 plays, 87 yards, 6:46.**
- LAR – Ben Skowronek 17-yard run (Matt Gay kick), 0:11. Rams 17–10. **Drive: 5 plays, 80 yards, 2:50.**

**Fourth quarter**

- LAR – Darrell Henderson 2-yard run (Matt Gay kick), 8:15. Rams 24–10. **Drive: 10 plays, 61 yards, 5:17.**

**Top passers**

- CAR – P. J. Walker – 10/16, 60 yards
- LAR – Matthew Stafford – 26/33, 253 yards, TD, INT

**Top rushers**

- CAR – Christian McCaffrey – 13 rushes, 69 yards
- LAR – Darrell Henderson – 13 rushes, 43 yards, TD

**Top receivers**

- CAR – Christian McCaffrey – 7 receptions, 89 yards
- LAR – Cooper Kupp – 7 receptions, 80 yards

The Rams defense held the visiting Panthers out of the end zone while the offense finally got untracked as Los Angeles evened its record to 3–3 going into the bye week. Linebackers Ernest Jones and Bobby Wagner shared the team lead with seven tackles each while leading a defensive effort that limited Carolina to just 203 total yards. Cornerback Jalen Ramsey had three solo tackles including a sack and free safety Nick Scott added an interception to snuff out the Panthers' final offensive drive. For the Rams, wide receiver Allen Robinson scored on a 5-yard touchdown pass from quarterback Matthew Stafford late in the second quarter and finished with five receptions for 63 yards. Fellow wide receiver Ben Skowronek also had five receptions (for 40 yards) and scored the first touchdown of his NFL career on a 17-yard run in the third quarter. Getting his first start of the season, running back Darrell Henderson had 12 carries for 43 yards including a 2-yard touchdown run midway through the fourth quarter. Stafford completed 26 of 33 passes for 253 yards and a touchdown, but threw a costly interception that was returned for a touchdown to give Carolina a 10–7 halftime lead.

==== Week 8: vs. San Francisco 49ers ====
Week 8: San Francisco 49ers at Los Angeles Rams – Game summary

Quarter	1	2	3	4	Total
**49ers**	0	10	7	14	**31**
Rams	7	7	0	0	**14**

at SoFi Stadium, Inglewood, California

- Date: October 30
- Game time: 1:25 p.m. PDT
- Game weather: Sunny, 75 °F (24 °C)
- Game attendance: 73,505
- Referee: John Hussey
- TV announcers (Fox): Kevin Burkhardt, Greg Olsen, Erin Andrews and Tom Rinaldi
- Recap, Game Book

Game information

**First quarter**

- LAR – Matthew Stafford 1-yard run (Matt Gay kick), 0:09. Rams 7–0. **Drive: 17 plays, 88 yards, 9:21.**

**Second quarter**

- SF – Brandon Aiyuk 34-yard pass from Christian McCaffrey (Robbie Gould kick), 12:10. Tied 7–7. **Drive: 6 plays, 71 yards, 2:59.**
- LAR – Cooper Kupp 16-yard pass from Matthew Stafford (Matt Gay kick), 6:35. Rams 14–7. **Drive: 9 plays, 75 yards, 5:35.**
- SF – Robbie Gould 39-yard field goal, 1:00. Rams 14–10. **Drive: 11 plays, 52 yards, 5:35.**

**Third quarter**

- SF – Christian McCaffrey 9-yard pass from Jimmy Garoppolo (Robbie Gould kick), 1:51. 49ers 17–14. **Drive: 11 plays, 88 yards, 6:54.**

**Fourth quarter**

- SF – Christian McCaffrey 1-yard run (Robbie Gould kick), 12:07. 49ers 24–14. **Drive: 6 plays, 58 yards, 3:08.**
- SF – George Kittle 7-yard pass from Jimmy Garoppolo (Robbie Gould kick), 6:41. 49ers 31–14. **Drive: 5 plays, 73 yards, 3:06.**

**Top passers**

- SF – Jimmy Garoppolo – 21/25, 235 yards, 2 TD
- LAR – Matthew Stafford – 22/33, 187 yards, TD

**Top rushers**

- SF – Christian McCaffrey – 18 rushes, 94 yards, TD
- LAR – Ronnie Rivers – 8 rushes, 21 yards

**Top receivers**

- SF – Brandon Aiyuk – 6 receptions, 81 yards, TD
- LAR – Cooper Kupp – 8 receptions, 79 yards, TD

In a rematch of the 2021 NFC Championship Game, the visiting 49ers continued their regular season dominance of the Rams by scoring 21 unanswered points in the second half. Making his first start for San Francisco 10 days after a midseason trade with Carolina, running back Christian McCaffrey turned in a spectacular performance, rushing for a game-high 94 yards on 18 carries with a 1-yard touchdown run, catching a team-high 8 passes for 55 yards including a 9-yard touchdown reception, while throwing a 34-yard touchdown pass to Brandon Aiyuk. McCaffrey, who played his last game for the Panthers two weeks earlier against the Rams on the same field, joined Walter Payton and LaDainian Tomlinson as the only players to run, catch, and throw for touchdowns in the same game. Los Angeles took a 14–10 halftime lead as quarterback Matthew Stafford ran for a 1-yard touchdown in the first quarter and threw a 16-yard touchdown pass to wide receiver Cooper Kupp in the second, but the Rams were held to just 58 yards after halftime. Kupp had seven receptions in the first half but was held to only one catch after the intermission. Linebacker Leonard Floyd had a team-high nine tackles including two sacks. 49ers quarterback Jimmy Garoppolo completed 21 of 25 passes for 235 yards and two touchdowns and improved to 8–1 lifetime against the Rams as San Francisco won its eighth straight regular season game over Los Angeles.

==== Week 9: at Tampa Bay Buccaneers ====
Week 9: Los Angeles Rams at Tampa Bay Buccaneers – Game summary

Quarter	1	2	3	4	Total
Rams	0	7	6	0	**13**
**Buccaneers**	3	3	0	10	**16**

at Raymond James Stadium, Tampa, Florida

- Date: November 6
- Game time: 4:25 p.m. EST/1:25 p.m. PST
- Game weather: Cloudy, 88 °F (31 °C)
- Game attendance: 69,019
- Referee: Shawn Hochuli
- TV announcers (CBS): Jim Nantz, Tony Romo and Tracy Wolfson
- Recap, Game Book

Game information

**First quarter**

- TB – Ryan Succop 20-yard field goal, 7:16. Buccaneers 3–0. **Drive: 12 plays, 54 yards, 6:35.**

**Second quarter**

- LAR – Cooper Kupp 69-yard pass from Matthew Stafford (Matt Gay kick), 12:57. Rams 7–3. **Drive: 8 plays, 91 yards, 4:03.**
- TB – Ryan Succop 38-yard field goal, 0:24. Rams 7–6. **Drive: 9 plays, 70 yards, 1:33.**

**Third quarter**

- LAR – Matt Gay 26-yard field goal, 9:14. Rams 10–6. **Drive: 11 plays, 67 yards, 4:48.**
- LAR – Matt Gay 35-yard field goal, 0:09. Rams 13–6. **Drive: 6 plays, 31 yards, 3:47.**

**Fourth quarter**

- TB – Ryan Succop 50-yard field goal, 8:07. Rams 13–9. **Drive: 9 plays, 30 yards, 3:30.**
- TB – Cade Otton 1-yard pass from Tom Brady (Ryan Succop kick), 0:09. Buccaneers 16–13. **Drive: 6 plays, 60 yards, 0:35.**

**Top passers**

- LAR – Matthew Stafford – 13/27, 165 yards, TD
- TB – Tom Brady – 36/58, 280 yards, TD

**Top rushers**

- LAR – Darrell Henderson – 12 rushes, 56 yards
- TB – Rachaad White – 8 rushes, 27 yards

**Top receivers**

- LAR – Cooper Kupp – 8 receptions, 127 yards, TD
- TB – Cade Otton – 5 receptions, 68 yards, TD

In a matchup of the two previous Super Bowl champions (as well as a rematch of a memorable 2021 NFC Divisional playoff game), the Rams lost a heartbreaking game in Tampa Bay to fall to 3–5 on the season. The Buccaneers made it to the red zone on their opening drive, but the Rams' defense held and forced a field goal, which put the Buccaneers in front 3–0. In the second quarter, the Rams took a 7–3 lead when Stafford connected with Kupp on a 69-yard touchdown pass. From there, the teams exchanged punts and field goals until the final minute of the game. On Tampa Bay's penultimate drive with the Rams ahead 13–9, the Buccaneers had first-and-goal at the L.A. 6, but Rams cornerback Jalen Ramsey deflected two passes from Buccaneers quarterback Tom Brady, causing the Bucs to turn the ball over on downs. The Rams had a chance to run out the clock on the ensuing possession, but failed to do so. After a punt with about one minute remaining in the game, Brady dissected the Rams' soft zone defense on the Buccaneers' final drive and put his team ahead with a 1-yard touchdown pass to rookie tight end Cade Otton with nine seconds remaining in the game. The 16–13 victory was Tampa Bay's first win at home against the Rams since 2010

==== Week 10: vs. Arizona Cardinals ====
Week 10: Arizona Cardinals at Los Angeles Rams – Game summary

Quarter	1	2	3	4	Total
**Cardinals**	3	14	0	10	**27**
Rams	3	0	7	7	**17**

at SoFi Stadium, Inglewood, California

- Date: November 13
- Game time: 1:25 p.m. PST
- Game weather: Sunny, 68 °F (20 °C)
- Game attendance: 71,752
- Referee: Clete Blakeman
- TV announcers (Fox): Kenny Albert, Jonathan Vilma and Shannon Spake
- Recap, Game Book

Game information

**First quarter**

- LAR – Matt Gay 36-yard field goal, 6:16. Rams 3–0. **Drive: 4 plays, 57 yards, 8:44.**
- ARI – Tristan Vizcaino 36-yard field goal, 0:13. Tied 3–3. **Drive: 14 plays, 57 yards, 6:03.**

**Second quarter**

- ARI – James Conner 4-yard run (Tristan Vizcaino kick), 1:56. Cardinals 10–3. **Drive: 13 plays, 66 yards, 6:31.**
- ARI – A. J. Green 6-yard pass from Colt McCoy (Tristan Vizcaino kick), 0:24. Cardinals 17–3. **Drive: 5 plays, 30 yards, 1:10.**

**Third quarter**

- LAR – Darrell Henderson 4-yard run (Matt Gay kick), 4:24. Cardinals 17–10. **Drive: 7 plays, 59 yards, 3:07.**

**Fourth quarter**

- ARI – James Conner 9-yard run (Tristan Vizcaino kick), 7:41. Cardinals 24–10. **Drive: 9 plays, 60 yards, 5:03.**
- ARI – Tristan Vizcaino 46-yard field goal, 3:44. Cardinals 27–10. **Drive: 4 plays, 3 yards, 1:49.**
- LAR – Van Jefferson 3-yard pass from John Wolford (Matt Gay kick), 0:07. Cardinals 27–17. **Drive: 11 plays, 75 yards, 3:37.**

**Top passers**

- ARI – Colt McCoy – 26/37, 238 yards, TD
- LAR – John Wolford – 24/36, 212 yards, TD, INT

**Top rushers**

- ARI – James Conner – 21 rushes, 69 yards, TD
- LAR – Cam Akers – 6 rushes, 22 yards

**Top receivers**

- ARI – DeAndre Hopkins – 10 receptions, 98 yards
- LAR – Tyler Higbee – 8 receptions, 73 yards

With their playoff hopes fading after two consecutive losses, the Rams returned home for a game against the Arizona Cardinals, who the Rams had defeated earlier in the season. With backup quarterback John Wolford starting in place of Matthew Stafford, who was unable to play due to concussion protocols, the Rams' offense continued to struggle as it had all season. After the Rams' Matt Gay kicked a field goal on their opening drive, the Cardinals scored 17 unanswered points, including two touchdowns inside of the final two minutes of the first half. With 1:56 remaining in the second quarter, Arizona running back James Conner scored a touchdown to put the Cardinals ahead 10–3. On the ensuing Rams' drive, a strip sack of Wolford by Arizona linebacker Myjai Sanders gave the Cardinals prime field position, and they cashed in when Arizona backup quarterback Colt McCoy connected with wide receiver A. J. Green on a 6-yard touchdown pass with 24 seconds remaining in the half. In the third quarter, a 4-yard touchdown run by Darrell Henderson pulled the Rams to within one score of the Cardinals. However, in the final quarter, Arizona wide receiver Rondale Moore made an amazing one-handed catch of a McCoy pass on 4th-and-3 for 26 yards, leading to a 9-yard touchdown run by Conner that brought Arizona's lead back to 14 points. A field goal later in the quarter increased Arizona's advantage to 17 points, and the game ended 27–17 after the Rams scored with seven seconds remaining on a TD pass from Wolford to wide receiver Van Jefferson. With the loss, the Rams fell to 3–6 on the season. Kupp also suffered an ankle sprain during the game and was ruled out for the upcoming game at the New Orleans Saints.

==== Week 11: at New Orleans Saints ====
Week 11: Los Angeles Rams at New Orleans Saints – Game summary

Quarter	1	2	3	4	Total
Rams	7	7	0	6	**20**
**Saints**	3	7	14	3	**27**

at Caesars Superdome, New Orleans, Louisiana

- Date: November 20
- Game time: 12:00 p.m. CST/10:00 a.m. PST
- Game weather: None (indoor stadium)
- Game attendance: 70,025
- Referee: Ronald Torbert
- TV announcers (Fox): Kenny Albert, Jonathan Vilma and Shannon Spake
- Recap, Game Book

Game information

**First quarter**

- NO – Wil Lutz 46-yard field goal, 4:14. Saints 3–0. **Drive: 9 plays, 31 yards, 4:36.**
- LAR – Tutu Atwell 62-yard pass from Matthew Stafford (Matt Gay kick), 4:00. Rams 7–3. **Drive: 1 plays, 62 yards, 0:14.**

**Second quarter**

- NO – Juwan Johnson 8-yard pass from Andy Dalton (Wil Lutz kick), 12:11. Saints 10–7. **Drive: 7 plays, 49 yards, 3:00.**
- LAR – Allen Robinson 6-yard pass from Matthew Stafford (Matt Gay kick), 0:19. Rams 14–10. **Drive: 11 plays, 87 yards, 2:54.**

**Third quarter**

- NO – Jarvis Landry 7-yard pass from Andy Dalton (Wil Lutz kick), 10:23. Saints 17–14. **Drive: 9 plays, 75 yards, 4:37.**
- NO – Chris Olave 53-yard pass from Andy Dalton (Wil Lutz kick), 5:47. Saints 24–14. **Drive: 5 plays, 68 yards, 2:53.**

**Fourth quarter**

- LAR – Matt Gay 33-yard field goal, 14:48. Saints 24–17. **Drive: 12 plays, 60 yards, 5:59.**
- NO – Wil Lutz 25-yard field goal, 9:06. Saints 27–17. **Drive: 9 plays, 69 yards, 5:42.**
- LAR – Matt Gay 58-yard field goal, 0:06. Saints 27–20. **Drive: 6 plays, 34 yards, 1:17.**

**Top passers**

- LAR – Matthew Stafford – 11/18, 159 yards, 2 TD
- NO – Andy Dalton – 21/25, 260 yards, 3 TD

**Top rushers**

- LAR – Cam Akers – 14 rushes, 61 yards
- NO – Taysom Hill – 9 rushes, 52 yards

**Top receivers**

- LAR – Tutu Atwell – 1 reception, 62 yards, TD
- NO – Chris Olave – 5 receptions, 102 yards, TD

For the first time in his coaching career, Sean McVay lost four straight games as Los Angeles dropped its record to 3–7 in their first visit to the Superdome since the 2018 NFC Championship Game. Returning to the starting lineup, quarterback Matthew Stafford threw two touchdowns in the first half, but was pulled out of the game midway through the third quarter after taking several hard hits. Without him, the Rams offense was held to two field goals in yet another lackluster second half effort. Saints quarterback Andy Dalton threw two touchdown passes in the third quarter to turn a 14–10 deficit into a 24–14 lead for New Orleans. Playing his first significant action of the season, Rams backup quarterback Bryce Perkins completed 5 of 10 passes for 64 yards and ran five times for 39 yards but was sacked three times in the loss. Wide receiver Allen Robinson caught four passes for 47 yards and a touchdown and running back Cam Akers ran 14 times for 61 yards for Los Angeles on offense, while defensive linebacker Leonard Floyd and defensive tackle Greg Gaines had two sacks each, but the Rams defense failed to generate a turnover for the fourth straight game.

==== Week 12: at Kansas City Chiefs ====
Week 12: Los Angeles Rams at Kansas City Chiefs – Game summary

Quarter	1	2	3	4	Total
Rams	0	3	0	7	**10**
**Chiefs**	7	6	7	6	**26**

at Arrowhead Stadium, Kansas City, Missouri

- Date: November 27
- Game time: 3:25 p.m. CST/1:25 p.m. PST
- Game weather: 44 °F (7 °C)
- Game attendance: 73,557
- Referee: Adrian Hill
- TV announcers (Fox): Kevin Burkhardt, Greg Olsen, Erin Andrews and Tom Rinaldi
- Recap, Game Book

Game information

**First quarter**

- KC – Travis Kelce 39-yard pass from Patrick Mahomes (Harrison Butker kick), 5:40. Chiefs 7–0. **Drive: 9 plays, 90 yards, 4:20.**

**Second quarter**

- LAR – Matt Gay 47-yard field goal, 14:57. Chiefs 7–3. **Drive: 10 plays, 46 yards, 5:43.**
- KC – Harrison Butker 27-yard field goal, 9:50. Chiefs 10–3. **Drive: 12 plays, 66 yards, 5:07.**
- KC – Harrison Butker 32-yard field goal, 0:16. Chiefs 13–3. **Drive: 13 plays, 83 yards, 3:00.**

**Third quarter**

- KC – Isiah Pacheco 3-yard run (Harrison Butker kick), 6:32. Chiefs 20–3. **Drive: 12 plays, 71 yards, 6:52.**

**Fourth quarter**

- LAR – Van Jefferson 7-yard pass from Bryce Perkins (Matt Gay kick), 14:56. Chiefs 20–10. **Drive: 14 plays, 75 yards, 6:36.**
- KC – Harrison Butker 22-yard field goal, 6:36. Chiefs 23–10. **Drive: 4 plays, 5 yards, 1:33.**
- KC – Harrison Butker 22-yard field goal, 1:44. Chiefs 26–10. **Drive: 9 plays, 24 yards, 3:33.**

**Top passers**

- LAR – Bryce Perkins – 13/23, 100 yards, TD, 2 INT
- KC – Patrick Mahomes – 27/42, 320 yards, TD, INT

**Top rushers**

- LAR – Bryce Perkins – 9 rushes, 44 yards
- KC – Isiah Pacheco – 22 rushes, 69 yards, TD

**Top receivers**

- LAR – Van Jefferson – 3 receptions, 29 yards, TD
- KC – Travis Kelce – 4 receptions, 57 yards, TD

With Matthew Stafford sidelined again due to concussion protocols and down their top two receivers, the injury-riddled Rams fell on the road to the AFC-leading Chiefs. Kansas City drove 90 yards on nine plays midway through the first period to score the game's first points as star quarterback Patrick Mahomes connected with tight end Travis Kelce on a 39-yard touchdown pass. From that point, the Rams' defense made several red zone stands against one of the best offenses in football to keep the game close. Free safety Nick Scott killed a Kansas City drive with an interception near the goal line in the fourth quarter, L.A.'s first defensive turnover in five games. Fellow safety Taylor Rapp led the Rams with 12 tackles, while defensive tackle Aaron Donald had three tackles before leaving the game with a sprained ankle. The Rams' offense, led by third-string quarterback Bryce Perkins making his first career regular season start, struggled to gain traction and only mustered ten points with Perkins throwing a 12-yard touchdown pass to wide receiver Van Jefferson to start the fourth period as the Rams' losing streak reached five straight games.

==== Week 13: vs. Seattle Seahawks ====
Week 13: Seattle Seahawks at Los Angeles Rams – Game summary

Quarter	1	2	3	4	Total
**Seahawks**	7	7	3	10	**27**
Rams	10	3	0	10	**23**

at SoFi Stadium, Inglewood, California

- Date: December 4
- Game time: 1:05 p.m. PST
- Game weather: Cloudy, 64 °F (18 °C)
- Game attendance: 71,802
- Referee: Shawn Smith
- TV announcers (Fox): Kevin Kugler, Mark Sanchez and Laura Okmin
- Reap, Game Book

Game information

**First quarter**

- LAR – Cam Akers 1-yard run (Matt Gay kick), 9:30. Rams 7–0. **Drive: 10 plays, 77 yards, 5:30.**
- SEA – Tyler Lockett 36-yard pass from Geno Smith (Jason Myers kick), 6:05. Tied 7–7. **Drive: 6 plays, 75 yards, 3:25.**
- LAR – Matt Gay 40-yard field goal, 2:34. Rams 10–7. **Drive: 7 plays, 53 yards, 3:31.**

**Second quarter**

- SEA – Noah Fant 4-yard pass from Geno Smith (Jason Myers kick), 9:48. Seahawks 14–10. **Drive: 11 plays, 91 yards, 5:12.**
- LAR – Matt Gay 54-yard field goal, 0:55. Seahawks 14–13. **Drive: 7 plays, 28 yards, 2:09.**

**Third quarter**

- SEA – Jason Myers 41-yard field goal, 7:33. Seahawks 17–13. **Drive: 8 plays, 60 yards, 3:49.**

**Fourth quarter**

- LAR – Matt Gay 32-yard field goal, 12:57. Seahawks 17–16. **Drive: 9 plays, 42 yards, 3:49.**
- SEA – Jason Myers 26-yard field goal, 6:46. Seahawks 20–16. **Drive: 11 plays, 67 yards, 6:11.**
- LAR – Cam Akers 6-yard run (Matt Gay kick), 2:56. Rams 23–20. **Drive: 9 plays, 75 yards, 3:50.**
- SEA – DK Metcalf 8-yard pass from Geno Smith (Jason Myers kick), 0:36. Seahawks 27–23. **Drive: 10 plays, 75 yards, 2:20.**

**Top passers**

- SEA – Geno Smith – 28/39, 367 yards, 3 TD, INT
- LAR – John Wolford – 14/26, 178 yards, 2 INT

**Top rushers**

- SEA – DeeJay Dallas – 10 rushes, 37 yards
- LAR – Cam Akers – 17 rushes, 60 yards, 2 TD

**Top receivers**

- SEA – Tyler Lockett – 9 receptions, 128 yards, TD
- LAR – Tutu Atwell – 2 receptions, 48 yards

The Rams rallied to take a fourth quarter lead but could not hold on as Geno Smith's 8-yard touchdown pass to DK Metcalf with 36 seconds remaining gave Seattle its first win at Los Angeles since 2017. Smith passed for 367 yards and three touchdowns as the Rams fell to 3–9, ensuring themselves of the team's first losing season since 2016 and first losing season ever for head coach Sean McVay. Running back Cam Akers' 1-yard touchdown run capped off an impressive 10-play, 77-yard opening drive for Los Angeles and kicker Matt Gay added a 40-yard field goal. Gay added two more field goals of 54 and 32 yards to keep the Rams close and Akers (17 carries, 60 yards) scored his second touchdown of the day on a 6-yard run with 2:56 remaining before Seattle made its final comeback. John Wolford got his second start at quarterback throwing 178 yards with two interceptions. Cornerback Derion Kendrick led the Rams with 10 tackles while middle linebacker Bobby Wagner recorded seven total tackles with two sacks and an interception in playing his first game against the Seahawks, with whom Wagner had played for the first 10 seasons of his career.

==== Week 14: vs. Las Vegas Raiders ====
Week 14: Las Vegas Raiders at Los Angeles Rams – Game summary

Quarter	1	2	3	4	Total
Raiders	10	3	0	3	**16**
**Rams**	3	0	0	14	**17**

at SoFi Stadium, Inglewood, California

- Date: December 8
- Game time: 5:15 p.m. PST
- Game weather: Clear, 57 °F (14 °C)
- Game attendance: 74,738
- Referee: Brad Rogers
- TV announcers (KTTV/Prime Video): Al Michaels, Kirk Herbstreit and Kaylee Hartung
- Recap, Game Book

Game information

**First quarter**

- LV – Josh Jacobs 1-yard run (Daniel Carlson kick), 9:13. Raiders 7–0. **Drive: 12 plays, 75 yards, 5:47.**
- LV – Daniel Carlson 52-yard field goal, 2:22. Raiders 10–0. **Drive: 8 play, 46 yards, 4:41.**
- LAR – Matt Gay 55-yard field goal, 0:06. Raiders 10–3. **Drive: 5 play, 29 yards, 2:16.**

**Second quarter**

- LV – Daniel Carlson 31-yard field goal, 9:40. Raiders 13–3. **Drive: 10 play, 56 yards, 5:26.**

**Third quarter**

- No scoring plays.

**Fourth quarter**

- LV – Daniel Carlson 36-yard field goal, 12:20. Raiders 16–3. **Drive: 11 play, 31 yards, 5:22.**
- LAR – Cam Akers 1-yard run (Matt Gay kick), 3:19. Raiders 16–10. **Drive: 17 play, 75 yards, 9:01.**
- LAR – Van Jefferson 23-yard pass from Baker Mayfield (Matt Gay kick), 0:10. Rams 17–16. **Drive: 8 play, 98 yards, 1:35.**

**Top passers**

- LV – Derek Carr – 11/20, 137 yards, 2 INT
- LAR – Baker Mayfield – 22/35, 230 yards, TD

**Top rushers**

- LV – Josh Jacobs – 27 rushes, 99 yards, TD
- LAR – Cam Akers – 12 rushes, 42 yards, TD

**Top receivers**

- LV – Davante Adams – 3 receptions, 71 yards
- LAR – Ben Skowronek – 7 receptions, 89 yards

Trailing by 13 points with under four minutes remaining, the Rams rallied for an improbable victory and ended their six-game losing streak during a Thursday Night Football game at SoFi Stadium. Acquired off waivers from Carolina just two days earlier, quarterback Baker Mayfield supplanted starter John Wolford after the first series and led the Rams to a 55-yard field goal by Matt Gay. But the Rams offense struggled through the second and third quarters as the Raiders tried to build their lead after scoring a touchdown on the game's opening possession. L.A.'s defense turned in a strong performance after giving up the early touchdown, limiting the Raiders to three field goals the rest of the way. Middle linebacker Bobby Wagner led the Rams with 14 total tackles while fellow linebacker Ernest Jones's interception in the end zone late in the second quarter snuffed out another Las Vegas threat. The Raiders were up 16–3 in the fourth quarter after kicking a field goal with 12:20 to go, but L.A. went on a 17-play, 75-yard drive that consumed nine minutes, culminating with a 1-yard touchdown run by running back Cam Akers with 3:19 remaining to narrow the score to 16–10. After the defense forced a three-and-out on the next Raiders' possession, the Rams got the ball at their own 2-yard line with 1:45 remaining and proceeded to drive 98 yards in eight plays, with Mayfield throwing a game-tying 23-yard touchdown pass to Van Jefferson with nine seconds remaining. The Rams took their first lead of the night, 17–16, with Gay's successful extra point, and a Taylor Rapp interception on the first play after the ensuing kickoff sealed the game. Mayfield was named NFC Offensive Player of the Week after completing 22 of 35 passes for 230 yards and a TD. The Rams' 98-yard go-ahead drive was reported to be the longest drive of its kind in the final two minutes of a game over the previous 45 NFL seasons.

==== Week 15: at Green Bay Packers ====
Week 15: Los Angeles Rams at Green Bay Packers – Game summary

Quarter	1	2	3	4	Total
Rams	0	6	6	0	**12**
**Packers**	3	7	14	0	**24**

at Lambeau Field, Green Bay, Wisconsin

- Date: December 19
- Game time: 7:15 p.m. CST/5:15 p.m. PST
- Game weather: Cloudy, 15 °F (−9 °C)
- Game attendance: 77,269
- Referee: Shawn Hochuli
- TV announcers (ESPN/ABC): Joe Buck, Troy Aikman and Lisa Salters
- Recap, Game Book

Game information

**First quarter**

- GB – Mason Crosby 34-yard field goal, 4:25. Packers 3–0. **Drive: 12 plays, 52 yards, 6:14.**

**Second quarter**

- LAR – Matt Gay 33-yard field goal, 10:41. Tied 3–3. **Drive: 9 plays, 53 yards, 4:47.**
- GB – A. J. Dillon 8-yard run (Mason Crosby kick), 4:26. Packers 10–3. **Drive: 11 plays, 74 yards, 6:15.**
- LAR – Matt Gay 55-yard field goal, 0:46. Packers 10–6. **Drive: 10 plays, 28 yards, 3:40.**

**Third quarter**

- GB – A. J. Dillon 1-yard run (Mason Crosby kick), 8:04. Packers 17–6. **Drive: 11 plays, 68 yards, 6:56.**
- GB – Aaron Jones 7-yard pass from Aaron Rodgers (Mason Crosby kick), 2:31. Packers 24–6. **Drive: 6 plays, 35 yards, 3:02.**
- LAR – Tyler Higbee 8-yard pass from Baker Mayfield (kick failed, wide right), 0:22. Packers 24–12. **Drive: 6 plays, 70 yards, 2:09.**

**Fourth quarter**

- No scoring plays.

**Top passers**

- LAR – Baker Mayfield – 12/21, 111 yards, TD, INT
- GB – Aaron Rodgers – 22/30, 229 yards, TD, INT

**Top rushers**

- LAR – Cam Akers – 12 rushes, 65 yards
- GB – Aaron Jones – 17 rushes, 90 yards

**Top receivers**

- LAR – Cam Akers – 3 receptions, 35 yards
- GB – Romeo Doubs – 5 receptions, 55 yards

Despite playing in chilly conditions at Lambeau Field, the visiting Rams played close in the first half but ultimately fell to the host Packers on Monday Night Football. Making his first start at quarterback for the Rams, Baker Mayfield completed only 12 of 21 passes for 111 yards with a touchdown and an interception. Kicker Matt Gay's field goals of 33 and 55 yards in the second quarter accounted for all of the Rams' first half points. But Green Bay pulled away as running back A. J. Dillon scored two touchdowns and running back Aaron Jones scored on a 7-yard pass from quarterback Aaron Rodgers to put the Packers up 24–6. The Rams answered with Mayfield throwing an 8-yard TD pass to tight end Tyler Higbee late in the third period to end the game's scoring. L.A. running back Cam Akers had 100 yards in total offense (12 rushes, 65 yards; 3 receptions, 35 yards) to lead the Rams offense. On defense, Taylor Rapp had his second interception in as many weeks and linebacker Leonard Floyd had two sacks in the game, which dropped the Rams' record to 4–10 while eliminating them from playoff contention.

==== Week 16: vs. Denver Broncos ====
Christmas Day games

Week 16: Denver Broncos at Los Angeles Rams – Game summary

Quarter	1	2	3	4	Total
Broncos	3	3	0	8	**14**
**Rams**	17	14	3	17	**51**

at SoFi Stadium, Inglewood, California

- Date: December 25
- Game time: 1:30 p.m. PST
- Game weather: Sunny, 82 °F (28 °C)
- Game attendance: 71,525
- Referee: Ronald Torbert
- TV announcers (CBS/Nick): Jim Nantz, Tony Romo and Tracy Wolfson (CBS)
  Noah Eagle, Nate Burleson, Gabrielle Nevaeh Green, Dylan Schefter, Mia Burleson, and Bill Fagerbakke (as Patrick Star) (Nickelodeon)
- Recap, Game Book

Game information

**First quarter**

- LAR – Matt Gay 55-yard field goal, 8:26. Rams 3–0. **Drive: 11 plays, 38 yards, 6:34.**
- LAR – Tyler Higbee 9-yard pass from Baker Mayfield (Matt Gay kick), 6:19. Rams 10–0. **Drive: 3 plays, 34 yards, 1:16.**
- LAR – Cam Akers 2-yard run (Matt Gay kick), 4:45. Rams 17–0. **Drive: 2 plays, 11 yards, 0:27.**
- DEN – Brandon McManus 54-yard field goal, 0:39. Rams 17–3. **Drive: 8 plays, 39 yards, 4:06.**

**Second quarter**

- LAR – Tyler Higbee 7-yard pass from Baker Mayfield (Matt Gay kick), 9:42. Rams 24–3. **Drive: 11 plays, 75 yards, 5:57.**
- LAR – Cam Akers 2-yard run (Matt Gay kick), 1:06. Rams 31–3. **Drive: 12 plays, 90 yards, 6:06.**
- DEN – Brandon McManus 49-yard field goal, 0:00. Rams 31–6. **Drive: 7 plays, 44 yards, 1:06.**

**Third quarter**

- LAR – Matt Gay 30-yard field goal, 3:49. Rams 34–6. **Drive: 15 plays, 68 yards, 9:08.**

**Fourth quarter**

- LAR – Cam Akers 4-yard run (Matt Gay kick), 12:31. Rams 41–6. **Drive: 8 plays, 60 yards, 4:47.**
- DEN – Greg Dulcich 11-yard pass from Russell Wilson (Latavius Murray run), 8:30. Rams 41–14. **Drive: 12 plays, 75 yards, 4:01.**
- LAR – Matt Gay 53-yard field goal, 6:16. Rams 44–14. **Drive: 4 plays, 6 yards, 2:14.**
- LAR – Cobie Durant 85-yard interception return (Matt Gay kick), 4:08. Rams 51–14.

**Top passers**

- DEN – Russell Wilson – 15/27, 214 yards, TD, 3 INT
- LAR – Baker Mayfield – 24/28, 230 yards, 2 TD

**Top rushers**

- DEN – Latavius Murray – 8 rushes, 34 yards
- LAR – Cam Akers – 23 rushes, 118 yards, 3 TD

**Top receivers**

- DEN – Jerry Jeudy – 6 receptions, 117 yards
- LAR – Tyler Higbee – 9 receptions, 94 yards, 2 TD

Playing their first-ever game on Christmas Day, the Rams put together their best performance of the season, scoring on eight consecutive possessions in a rout of the Broncos in L.A.'s final regular season home game. Despite playing with their 13th different offensive line combination in 15 games, the Rams' offense displayed considerable strength against the Broncos' defense, which was rated No. 3 in the NFL up to that point, rolling up 388 total yards. Running back Cam Akers had his best individual game of the season, rushing the ball 23 times for 118 yards and scoring a career-high three touchdowns. Quarterback Baker Mayfield completed 24 of 28 passes for 230 yards and two touchdowns, both of which went to tight end Tyler Higbee (nine receptions, 94 yards), whose 9-yard TD reception in the first quarter made him the Rams' all-time leader in touchdown receptions by a tight end in team history. Kicker Matt Gay added field goals of 30, 53, and 55 yards for Los Angeles. Meanwhile, the Rams’ defense recorded six sacks (two by newly-acquired defensive end Larrell Murchison) and four interceptions. Rookie cornerback Cobie Durant had two interceptions, the second of which he returned 85 yards for the game's final touchdown. With the win, the Rams improved to 5–10, winning their fifth straight game against Denver dating back to 2006, when the team was based in St. Louis.

==== Week 17: at Los Angeles Chargers ====
Week 17: Los Angeles Rams at Los Angeles Chargers – Game summary

Quarter	1	2	3	4	Total
Rams	3	7	0	0	**10**
**Chargers**	0	17	7	7	**31**

at SoFi Stadium, Inglewood, California

- Date: January 1
- Game time: 1:25 p.m. PST
- Game weather: Cloudy, 62 °F (17 °C)
- Game attendance: 70,240
- Referee: Clete Blakeman
- TV announcers (CBS): Spero Dedes and Jay Feely
- Recap, Game Book

Game information

**First quarter**

- LAR – Matt Gay 23-yard field goal, 1:09. Rams 3–0. **Drive: 13 plays, 81 yards, 8:10.**

**Second quarter**

- LAC – Austin Ekeler 10-yard run (Cameron Dicker kick), 13:40. Chargers 7–3. **Drive: 5 plays, 75 yards, 2:29.**
- LAC – Austin Ekeler 72-yard run (Cameron Dicker kick), 8:25. Chargers 14–3. **Drive: 5 plays, 90 yards, 1:55.**
- LAR – Malcolm Brown 23-yard run (Matt Gay kick), 4:09. Chargers 14–10. **Drive: 7 plays, 75 yards, 4:16.**
- LAC Cameron Dicker 40-yard field goal, 0:14. Chargers 17–10. **Drive: 13 plays, 53 yards, 3:55.**

**Third quarter**

- LAC – Gerald Everett 6-yard pass from Justin Herbert (Cameron Dicker kick), 8:46. Chargers 24–10. **Drive: 11 plays, 75 yards, 6:14.**

**Fourth quarter**

- LAC – Donald Parham 3 yard pass from Justin Herbert (Cameron Dicker kick), 12:12. Chargers 31–10. **Drive: 9 plays, 70 yards, 4:01.**

**Top passers**

- LAR – Baker Mayfield – 11/19, 132 yards
- LAC – Justin Herbert – 21/28, 212 yards, 2 TD

**Top rushers**

- LAR – Cam Akers – 19 rushes, 123 yards
- LAC – Austin Ekeler – 10 rushes, 122 yards, 2 TD

**Top receivers**

- LAR – Van Jefferson – 3 receptions, 77 yards
- LAC – Mike Williams – 7 receptions, 94 yards

A lackluster second half doomed the Rams in the first regular season matchup against the teams since both moved into SoFi Stadium. Kicker Matt Gay's 23-yard field goal near the end of the first quarter gave the Rams their only lead of the game. The Chargers pulled ahead as running back Austin Ekeler ran for touchdowns of 10 and 72 yards in the second quarter to help build a 17–10 halftime lead. Ekeler (10 carries, 122 yards) became the first running back to surpass 100 rushing yards against the Rams defense during the 2022 regular season. Chargers quarterback Justin Herbert completed 21 of 28 passes for 212 yards and threw two touchdowns in the second half, one to former Rams tight end Gerald Everett in the third quarter. The Rams were led by running back Cam Akers, who had 19 carries for 123 yards while fellow running back Malcolm Brown had a 23-yard run in the second quarter for the Rams' only touchdown. Quarterback Baker Mayfield completed 11 of 19 passes for 132 yards, but was sacked three times and fumbled once as the Rams were held to only 56 total offensive yards in the second half. The team's 11th defeat of the season surpassed the 1999 Denver Broncos for the most losses suffered by a defending Super Bowl champion.

==== Week 18: at Seattle Seahawks ====
Week 18: Los Angeles Rams at Seattle Seahawks – Game summary

Quarter	1	2	3	4	OT	Total
Rams	3	10	3	0	0	**16**
**Seahawks**	6	0	7	3	3	**19**

at Lumen Field, Seattle, Washington

- Date: January 8
- Game time: 1:25 p.m. PST
- Game weather: Rain, 47 °F (8 °C)
- Game attendance: 68,660
- Referee: Craig Wrolstad
- TV announcers (Fox): Kevin Kugler, Mark Sanchez and Laura Okmin
- Recap, Game Book

Game information

**First quarter**

- LAR – Matt Gay 22-yard field goal, 13:28. Rams 3–0. **Drive: 4 plays, 7 yards, 1:22.**
- SEA – Jason Myers 37-yard field goal, 7:09. Tied 3–3. **Drive: 11 plays, 56 yards, 6:19.**
- SEA – Jason Myers 36-yard field goal, 0:15. Seahawks 6–3. **Drive: 8 plays, 31 yards, 4:45.**

**Second quarter**

- LAR – Matt Gay 45-yard field goal, 11:58. Tied 6–6. **Drive: 7 plays, 48 yards, 3:17.**
- LAR – Tutu Atwell 11-yard rush (Matt Gay kick), 0:39. Rams 13–6. **Drive: 9 plays, 87 yards, 3:00.**

**Third quarter**

- SEA – Geno Smith 36-yard pass to Tyler Lockett (Jason Myers kick), 9:09. **Tied 13–13. Drive: 5 plays, 88 yards, 2:22.**
- LAR – Mat Gay 38-yard field goal, 4:13. Rams 16–13. **Drive: 9 plays,62 yards, 4:56.**

**Fourth quarter**

- SEA – Jason Myers 22-yard field goal, 2:19. Tied 16–16. **Drive: 16 plays, 82 yards, 7:16.**

**Overtime**

- SEA – Jason Myers 32-yard field goal, 4:34. Seahawks 19–16. **Drive: 8 plays, 50 yards, 3:50.**

**Top passers**

- LAR – Baker Mayfield – 13/26, 147 yards, INT
- SEA – Geno Smith – 19/31, 213 yards, TD, 2 INT

**Top rushers**

- LAR – Cam Akers – 21 rushes, 104 yards
- SEA – Kenneth Walker III – 29 rushes, 114 yards

**Top receivers**

- LAR – Van Jefferson – 3 receptions, 61 yards
- SEA – Tyler Lockett – 4 receptions, 54 yards

A Baker Mayfield interception in overtime led to a game-winning field goal by Seattle kicker Jason Myers as the host Seahawks earned a season sweep of the Rams for the first time since the 2013 season. The loss dropped the Rams' final record to 5–12, the fewest wins and the most losses for a defending Super Bowl champion in a full regular season, and their .294 win percentage eclipsed the .333 mark set by the San Francisco 49ers, who finished 3–6 in the strike-shortened 1982 season. This was also the worst record the Rams had since 2016, and their worst record under Sean McVay. Cornerback Jalen Ramsey had two interceptions of Seahawks quarterback Geno Smith, the first coming on the game's opening offensive play which led to a 22-yard field goal by kicker Matt Gay, who added a second field goal from 45 yards out in the second quarter. The Rams seized a 13–6 halftime with an 11-yard touchdown run on an end around by wide receiver Tutu Atwell to cap off a 9-play, 87-yard drive. Gay added a 38-yard field goal in the third quarter to give the Rams a 16–13 lead. Running back Cam Akers had 21 carries for 104 yards, his third straight game over 100 rushing yards, to lead the Rams offense, while wide receiver Van Jefferson had a team-high three receptions for 61 yards and was the intended receiver on Mayfield's final pass attempt, which was intercepted by Seattle strong safety Quandre Diggs in overtime to set up Myers' fourth and decisive field goal. Defensively, Ramsey had five tackles to go along with his two picks while former Seattle linebacker Bobby Wagner had a team-high seven tackles in the Rams' loss.

=== Standings ===
==== Division ====
NFC West
	W	L	T	PCT	DIV	CONF	PF	PA	STK
^{(2)} San Francisco 49ers	13	4	0	.765	6–0	10–2	450	277	W10
^{(7)} Seattle Seahawks	9	8	0	.529	4–2	6–6	407	401	W2
Los Angeles Rams	5	12	0	.294	1–5	3–9	307	384	L2
Arizona Cardinals	4	13	0	.235	1–5	3–9	340	449	L7

==== Conference ====
NFC
#	Team	Division	W	L	T	PCT	DIV	CONF	SOS	SOV	STK
**Division leaders**
1	Philadelphia Eagles	East	14	3	0	.824	4–2	9–3	.474	.460	W1
2 (Note: San Francisco claimed the No. 2 seed over Minnesota based on conference record (10–2 vs. 8–4).)	San Francisco 49ers	West	13	4	0	.765	6–0	10–2	.417	.414	W10
3	Minnesota Vikings	North	13	4	0	.765	4–2	8–4	.474	.425	W1
4	Tampa Bay Buccaneers	South	8	9	0	.471	4–2	8–4	.503	.426	L1
**Wild cards**
5	Dallas Cowboys	East	12	5	0	.706	4–2	8–4	.507	.485	L1
6	New York Giants	East	9	7	1	.559	1–4–1	4–7–1	.526	.395	L1
7 (Note: Seattle finished ahead of Detroit based on head-to-head victory, claiming the 7th and final playoff spot.)	Seattle Seahawks	West	9	8	0	.529	4–2	6–6	.462	.382	W2
**Did not qualify for the postseason**
8	Detroit Lions	North	9	8	0	.529	5–1	7–5	.535	.451	W2
9	Washington Commanders	East	8	8	1	.500	2–3–1	5–6–1	.536	.449	W1
10	Green Bay Packers	North	8	9	0	.471	3–3	6–6	.524	.449	L1
11 (Note: Carolina finished ahead of New Orleans and Atlanta based on head-to-head record (3–1 vs. 2–2/1–3).)	Carolina Panthers	South	7	10	0	.412	4–2	6–6	.474	.437	W1
12 (Note: New Orleans finished ahead of Atlanta based on head-to-head sweep.)	New Orleans Saints	South	7	10	0	.412	2–4	5–7	.507	.462	L1
13	Atlanta Falcons	South	7	10	0	.412	2–4	6–6	.467	.429	W2
14	Los Angeles Rams	West	5	12	0	.294	1–5	3–9	.517	.341	L2
15	Arizona Cardinals	West	4	13	0	.235	1–5	3–9	.529	.368	L7
16	Chicago Bears	North	3	14	0	.176	0–6	1–11	.571	.480	L10
**Tiebreakers** (Note: When breaking ties for three or more teams under the NFL's rules, they are first broken within divisions, then comparing only the highest-ranked remaining team from each division.)

== Awards and honors ==
Recipient	Award(s)
Baker Mayfield	Week 14: NFC Offensive Player of the Week
