= Ben Skowronek =

American football player (born 1997)

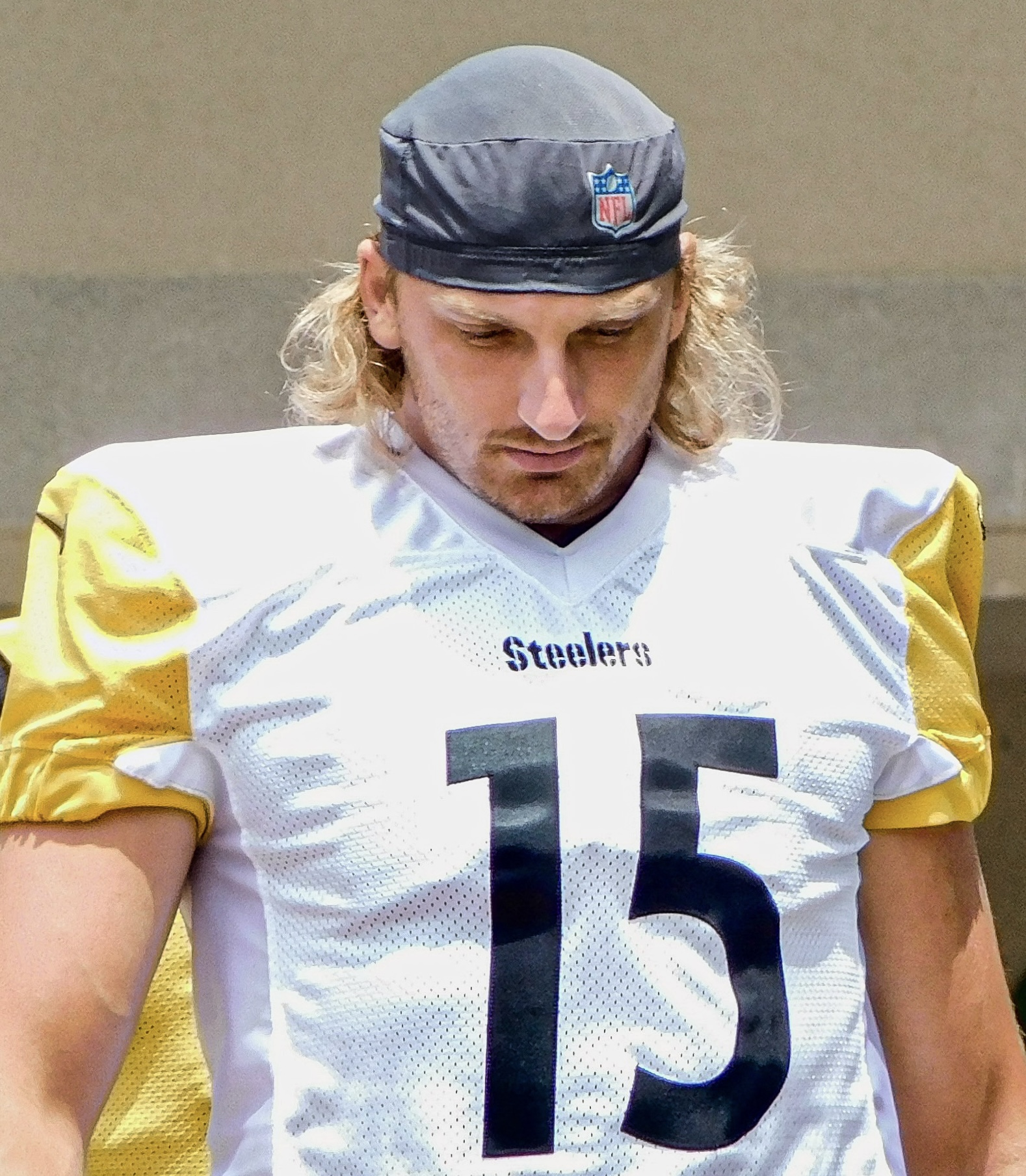
- Skowronek with the Pittsburgh Steelers in 2025

No. 15 – Pittsburgh Steelers
- Position: Wide receiver
- Roster status: Active

Personal information
- Born: June 27, 1997 (age 29); Fort Wayne, Indiana, U.S.
- Listed height: 6 ft 3 in (1.91 m)
- Listed weight: 224 lb (102 kg)

Career information
- High school: Homestead (Fort Wayne)
- College: Northwestern (2016–2019); Notre Dame (2020)
- NFL draft: 2021: 7th round, 249th overall pick

Career history
- Los Angeles Rams (2021–2023); Houston Texans (2024)*; Pittsburgh Steelers (2024–present)
- * Offseason or practice squad member only

Awards and highlights
- Super Bowl champion (LVI); Pro Bowl (2025)

Career NFL statistics as of 2026
- Receptions: 71
- Receiving yards: 745
- Receiving touchdowns: 3
- Rushing yards: 26
- Rushing touchdowns: 1
- Stats at Pro Football Reference

Bennett William Skowronek (/skəˈrɒnɪk/ skə-RON-ick; born June 27, 1997) is an American professional football wide receiver for the Pittsburgh Steelers of the National Football League (NFL). He played college football for the Northwestern Wildcats and Notre Dame Fighting Irish and was selected by the Los Angeles Rams in the seventh round of the 2021 NFL draft.

In 2025, he earned Pro Bowl honors for his performance on special teams.

== Early life ==
Skowronek grew up in Fort Wayne, Indiana and attended Homestead High School. He had 42 receptions for 841 yards and 12 touchdowns in his junior season. As a senior Skowronek caught 53 passes for 805 yards and nine touchdowns and was named first-team All-Indiana and was given the positional Mr. Indiana Football award.

== College career ==
Skowronek began his collegiate career at Northwestern University. He became a starter going into his sophomore year and finished the season with 45 catches for 644 yards and five touchdowns. Skowronek recorded 45 reception for 562 yards and two touchdowns in his junior season. He caught the game-clinching touchdown to lead the Wildcats to their first Big Ten West Division title by defeating No. 21 Iowa. He caught 12 passes for 141 yards in three games as a senior before suffering a season-ending leg injury and taking a medical redshirt.

Following the end of his senior season, Skowronek announced he would be transferring to the University of Notre Dame as a graduate student. He caught touchdown passes of 34 and 73 yards for the Fighting Irish in a 45–3 win over Pittsburgh. Skowronek finished the season with 29 catches for 439 yards and five touchdowns while also rushing for a touchdown.

== Professional career ==
Pre-draft measurables
Height	Weight	Arm length	Hand span	Wingspan	Bench press
6 ft 2 7/8 in (1.90 m)	220 lb (100 kg)	33 1/4 in (0.84 m)	10 1/8 in (0.26 m)	6 ft 6 1/8 in (1.98 m)	13 reps
All values from Pro Day

=== Los Angeles Rams ===
==== 2021 season ====
Skowronek was drafted by the Los Angeles Rams in the seventh round, 249th overall, of the 2021 NFL draft. On May 16, 2021, he signed his four-year rookie contract with Los Angeles. As a rookie, he appeared in 14 games and had one start. He finished with 11 receptions for 133 receiving yards. In Super Bowl LVI, Skowronek had two receptions for 12 yards in the 23–20 victory against the Cincinnati Bengals.

==== 2022 season ====
In a Week 6 win against the Carolina Panthers, Skowronek had a 19-yard reception lining up as at fullback. In that game, Skowronek also had a 17-yard rushing touchdown, which was also the first touchdown of his career. Skowronek would continue to play fullback throughout the 2022 season. In a 17–16 win over the Las Vegas Raiders in Week 14, Skowronek led the Rams with seven catches and 89 receiving yards. In the 2022 season, he appeared in 14 games, of which he started 11. He finished with 39 receptions for 376 receiving yards and one rushing touchdown.

==== 2023 season ====
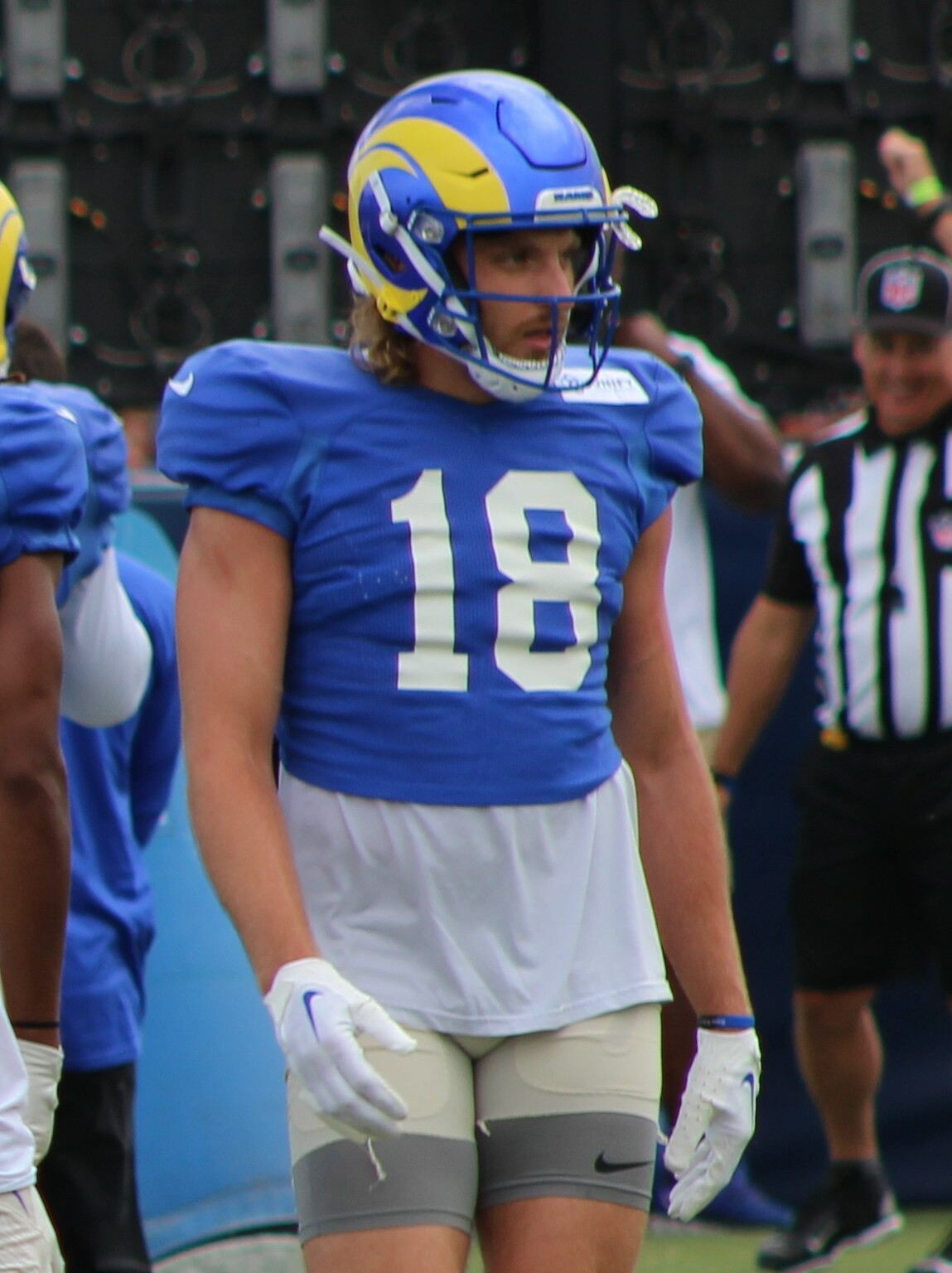
Skowronek with the Los Angeles Rams during training camp in 2023

During the 2023 season Skowronek continued his hybrid wide receiver/fullback role from the 2022 season. He played in 17 games and logged 8 receptions on 12 targets for 66 yards and 2 rushing attempts for 9 yards. He also recorded 13 tackles on special teams.

=== Houston Texans ===
On May 9, 2024, the Rams traded Skowronek and a seventh-round pick to the Houston Texans in exchange for a sixth-round pick. He was waived on August 27.

=== Pittsburgh Steelers ===
==== 2024 season ====
On August 29, 2024, Skowronek was signed to the Pittsburgh Steelers practice squad. He was signed to the active roster on September 17, but placed on injured reserve the following day. He was active for the November 10 game against the Washington Commanders and recovered a fumbled punt.

Skowronek recorded 5 receptions on 5 targets for 69 yards, along with recording 2 fumble recoveries and 7 special teams tackles. In addition to playing wide receiver, Skowronek also played fullback, H-Back, and tight end. Steelers offensive coordinator Arthur Smith would frequently have Skowronek move around the offense by using pre-snap motion.

==== 2025 season ====
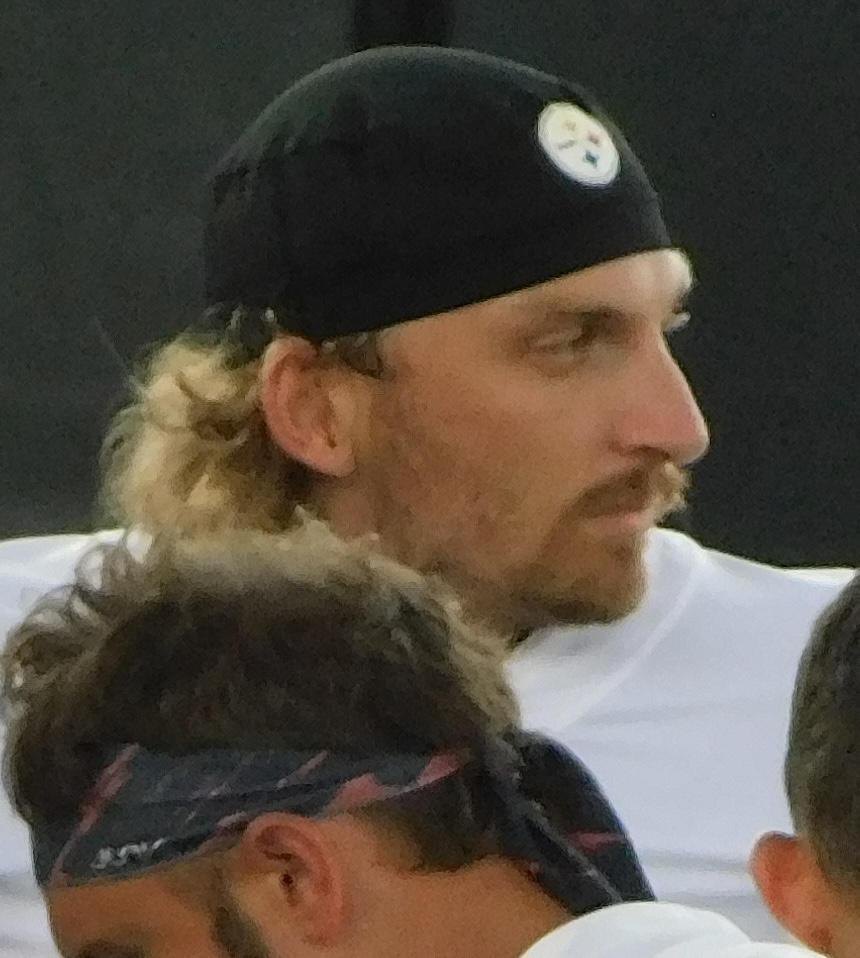
Skowronek with the Steelers in 2025

On March 13, 2025, Skowronek re-signed with the Steelers. In the Steelers' season opener against the New York Jets, Skowronek caught the team's first touchdown pass of the season from Aaron Rodgers. In that same game, he recovered a fumble which led to a Calvin Austin touchdown two plays later to give the Steelers the lead late in the game. Skrownek played through a hand injury throughout the final weeks of the 2025 season.

On December 23, 2025, Skowronek was named to his first career Pro Bowl at the special teams position.

== Career statistics ==
=== NFL ===
Legend
	Won the Super Bowl
**Bold**	Career high

==== Regular season ====
Year	Team	Games		Receiving					Rushing					Fumbles	
Year	Team	GP	GS	Rec	Yds	Avg	Lng	TD	Att	Yds	Avg	Lng	TD	Fum	Lost
2021	LAR	14	1	11	133	12.1	**35**	0	0	0	0.0	0	0	0	0
2022	LAR	14	11	**39**	**376**	9.6	32	0	1	**17**	**17.0**	**17**	**1**	0	0
2023	LAR	17	0	6	66	8.3	20	**1**	**2**	9	4.5	11	0	0	0
2024	PIT	10	1	5	69	13.8	23	0	0	0	0.0	0	0	0	0
2025	PIT	17	3	4	69	**17.3**	22	**1**	0	0	0.0	0	0	0	0
2026	PIT	6	0	4	32	8.0	23	**1**	0	0	0.0	0	0	0	0
Career		78	16	71	745	10.5	35	3	3	26	8.7	17	1	0	0

==== Postseason ====
Year	Team	Games		Receiving					Rushing					Fumbles	
Year	Team	GP	GS	Rec	Yds	Avg	Lng	TD	Att	Yds	Avg	Lng	TD	Fum	Lost
2021	LAR	4	0	**2**	**12**	**6.0**	**7**	0	0	0	0.0	0	0	0	0
2023	LAR	1	0	1	5	5.0	5	0	0	0	0.0	0	0	0	0
2024	PIT	1	0	0	0	0.0	0	0	0	0	0.0	0	0	0	0
2025	PIT	1	1	0	0	0.0	0	0	0	0	0.0	0	0	0	0
Career		7	1	3	17	5.7	7	0	0	0	0.0	0	0	0	0

=== College ===
Year	Team	Games		Receiving					Rushing				
Year	Team	GP	GS	Rec	Yds	Avg	Lng	TD	Att	Yds	Avg	Lng	TD
2016	Northwestern	13	0	8	70	8.8	14	0	0	0	0.0	0	0
2017	Northwestern	13	13	45	644	14.3	58	5	0	0	0.0	0	0
2018	Northwestern	14	14	45	562	12.5	40	3	0	0	0.0	0	0
2019	Northwestern	3	3	12	141	11.8	20	0	0	0	0.0	0	0
2020	Notre Dame	11	10	29	439	15.1	73	5	2	17	8.5	13	1
Career		54	40	139	1,856	13.4	73	13	2	17	8.5	13	1

== Personal life ==
Skowronek has distant Polish roots, and is distantly related to the 1947 Heisman Trophy winner Johnny Lujack. He is a cousin of the Olympic gymnast Courtney Kupets, and former NFL quarterback Trent Green is an uncle by marriage.

In March 2025, Skowronek married his wife, Brianna Stroup, who played lacrosse at Northwestern, in an outdoor ceremony in Boston, Massachusetts.
