= Ra'Shaad Samples =

American football player and coach (born 1994)

Oregon Ducks
- Title: Assistant Head Coach & Running Backs coach

Personal information
- Born: December 11, 1994 (age 31); Dallas, Texas, U.S.

Career information
- High school: Skyline (Dallas, Texas)
- College: Oklahoma State; Houston

Career history
- Houston (2016–2017) Student assistant; Texas (2018) Assistant wide receivers coach; SMU (2019) Offensive assistant; SMU (2020) Running backs coach & recruiting coordinator; SMU (2021) Assistant head coach & running backs coach; Los Angeles Rams (2022) Running backs coach; Arizona State (2023) Wide receivers coach & passing game coordinator; Oregon (2024–Present) Assistant head coach & running backs coach

Ra'Shaad Samples (born December 11, 1994) is an American football coach who is currently the Assistant Head Coach and Running Backs coach at the University of Oregon. He previously served as running backs coach for the Los Angeles Rams for part of a season. A native of Dallas, Texas. He previously served as the assistant head coach at SMU for 2 seasons (2019-2021).

== Playing career ==
Samples was a former four-star wide receiver at Oklahoma State who later transferred to play at Houston. His playing career was cut short when he was forced to medically retire due to suffering a number of concussions.

== Coaching career ==
=== SMU ===
Samples was hired as an offensive assistant at SMU in 2019, serving as the program's top recruiter rather coaching a position. He was officially promoted to running backs coach and recruiting coordinator in 2020, and was promoted to assistant head coach in 2021.

=== Texas Christian University ===
In late 2021, Samples left SMU and was announced as the assistant head coach and running backs coach for TCU, joining new head coach Sonny Dykes.

=== Los Angeles Rams ===
Around three months after joining the staff at TCU, Samples left for the NFL to become the Los Angeles Rams running backs coach for the 2022 season in March 2021.

=== Arizona State University ===
After 6 months with the Rams, Samples left the Rams before the end of the 2022 season to return to college as the passing game coordinator and wide receivers coach at Arizona State for the 2023 season.

=== University of Oregon ===
After the 2023 season with Arizona State University, Samples left Arizona State to join Oregon as running backs coach and assistant head coach in April 2024.

== Personal life ==
Samples is the son of current Duncanville High School and UIL Football State Champion-winning head coach Reginald Samples. Samples played for his father while a student-athlete at Skyline High School.
