= Lance McCutcheon =

American football player (born 1999)

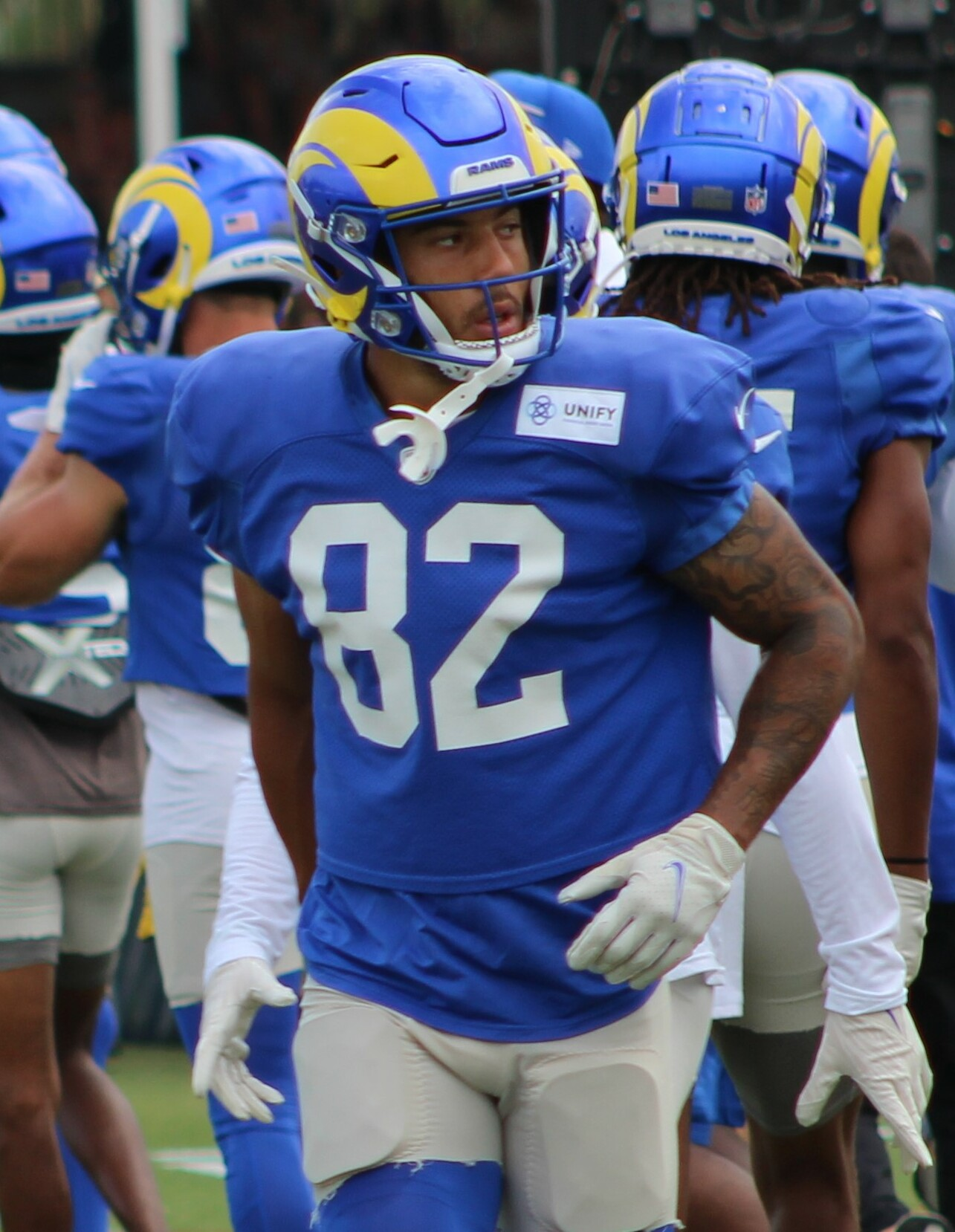
- McCutcheon with the Los Angeles Rams in 2023

Profile
- Position: Wide receiver

Personal information
- Born: February 28, 1999 (age 27); Bozeman, Montana, U.S.
- Listed height: 6 ft 3 in (1.91 m)
- Listed weight: 211 lb (96 kg)

Career information
- High school: Bozeman
- College: Montana State (2017–2021)
- NFL draft: 2022: undrafted

Career history
- Los Angeles Rams (2022); Houston Texans (2023)*; New York Jets (2023–2024)*; Pittsburgh Steelers (2024–2025)*; Tennessee Titans (2025–2026)*
- * Offseason or practice squad member only

Awards and highlights
- First-team All-Big Sky (2021)

Career NFL statistics
- Games played: 10
- Stats at Pro Football Reference

Lance McCutcheon (born February 28, 1999) is an American professional football wide receiver. He played college football for the Montana State Bobcats and was signed by the Los Angeles Rams as an undrafted free agent in 2022.

== Early life ==
McCutcheon grew up in Bozeman, Montana and attended Bozeman High School. As a senior, he caught 40 passes for 780 yards and 12 touchdowns on offense and also intercepted 10 passes on defense while playing cornerback.

== College career ==
McCutcheon played for four seasons with the Montana State Bobcats. He caught 13 passes for 197 yards and two touchdowns in his junior season. As a senior, he caught 61 passes for 1,219 yards and scored nine total touchdowns and was named first-team All-Big Sky Conference.

== Professional career ==
Pre-draft measurables
| Height | Weight | Arm length | Hand span | Wingspan | 40-yard dash | 10-yard split | 20-yard split | 20-yard shuttle | Three-cone drill | Vertical jump | Broad jump | Bench press |
|---|---|---|---|---|---|---|---|---|---|---|---|---|
| 6 ft 2 1/8 in (1.88 m) | 207 lb (94 kg) | 32 3/8 in (0.82 m) | 9 1/4 in (0.23 m) | 6 ft 4 7/8 in (1.95 m) | 4.57 s | 1.58 s | 2.66 s | 4.25 s | 6.82 s | 36.5 in (0.93 m) | 10 ft 2 in (3.10 m) | 19 reps |
All values from Pro Day

=== Los Angeles Rams ===
McCutcheon signed with the Los Angeles Rams as an undrafted free agent on May 5, 2022. He was waived by the team on May 17 and re-signed two days later. He made the Rams' initial 53-man roster out of training camp.

On August 28, 2023, McCutcheon was waived by the Rams as part of final roster cuts.

=== Houston Texans ===
On August 31, 2023, McCutcheon was signed to the Houston Texans' practice squad. He was released from the Texans on October 10.

=== New York Jets ===
On October 24, 2023, McCutcheon was signed to the New York Jets practice squad. He signed a reserve/future contract with New York on January 8, 2024.

On August 27, 2024, McCutcheon was waived by the Jets, re-signed to the practice squad the following day, and released two days later.

=== Pittsburgh Steelers ===
On October 14, 2024, McCutcheon was signed to the Pittsburgh Steelers' practice squad. He was released on November 12. He signed a reserve/future contract with Pittsburgh on January 14, 2025.

On August 25, 2025, McCutcheon was waived by the Steelers as part of preliminary roster cuts. On September 3, he was re-signed to the practice squad. McCutcheon was released by Pittsburgh on September 8.

=== Tennessee Titans ===
On October 23, 2025, McCutcheon was signed to the Tennessee Titans' practice squad. He was released on November 10 and re-signed to the practice squad eight days later.

On March 5, 2026, McCutcheon announced his retirement from professional football on his Instagram account. However, on April 1 McCutcheon reversed his decision to retire and re-signed with the Titans on a one-year contract. On August 30, McCutcheon was waived by the Titans as a part of final roster cuts before the start of the regular season.
