= Thad Bogardus =

American football coach (born 1989)

Minnesota Vikings
- Title: Outside linebackers coach

Personal information
- Born: January 1, 1989 (age 37); Redding, Connecticut, U.S.

Career information
- High school: La Salle College High School (PA)
- College: Elon University

Career history
- Ball State (2011-2013); Football operations graduate assistant (2011); Defensive graduate assistant (2012-2013); Buffalo Bills (2014) Defensive quality control coach; Denver Broncos (2015–2016) Coaching intern / defensive coaching assistant; Los Angeles Rams (2017–2022); Defensive quality control coach (2017-2018); Assistant defensive line / quality control coach (2019-2020); Assistant linebackers coach (2021); Outside linebackers coach (2022); Minnesota Vikings (2023–present); Assistant inside linebackers coach (2023-2024); Outside linebackers coach (2025-present)

Awards and highlights
- Super Bowl LVI champion (2021); Super Bowl 50 champion (2015)

Thad Bogardus (born January 1, 1989) is an American football coach who is the outside linebackers coach for the Minnesota Vikings of the National Football League (NFL). He previously worked for the Los Angeles Rams, Denver Broncos, and Buffalo Bills.

== Early life and education ==
Bogardus is a native of Redding, Connecticut. He attended Elon University, where he earned a degree in finance in 2011. While at Elon, he served as a student assistant and assistant video coordinator for the football program between 2007 and 2010.

== Coaching career ==
=== College coaching ===
Bogardus began his coaching career at Ball State University, serving as a football operations graduate assistant in 2011 and as a defensive graduate assistant from 2012 to 2013.

=== NFL career ===
==== Buffalo Bills and Denver Broncos ====
Bogardus joined the NFL in 2014 as a defensive quality control coach with the Buffalo Bills. He then spent two seasons with the Denver Broncos (2015–2016), first as a coaching intern and then as a defensive coaching assistant. He was part of the coaching staff that helped win Super Bowl 50.

==== Los Angeles Rams ====
Bogardus joined the Los Angeles Rams in 2017 and spent six seasons with the team. He worked as a defensive quality control coach (2017–2018), assistant defensive line/quality control coach (2019–2020), and assistant linebackers coach (2021). He was promoted to outside linebackers coach in 2022. He was part of the Rams' coaching staff during their Super Bowl LVI championship season in 2021.

==== Minnesota Vikings ====
On March 21, 2023, Bogardus was hired by the Minnesota Vikings as the assistant inside linebackers coach. He helped guide a defense that led the NFL in forced fumbles (21) and posted the second-most games (eight) with at least one forced fumble and one interception in 2023.

Bogardus played a key role in the development of undrafted rookie Ivan Pace Jr., who led all NFL rookies with 102 tackles in 2023 and became only the third undrafted rookie since 1987 to record over 100 tackles.

In 2024, Minnesota improved to a 14–3 record, with its defense leading the league in takeaways and ranking among the best in stopping the run and defending fourth-down attempts. Linebackers Blake Cashman and Pace Jr. recorded career highs in multiple categories under Bogardus' guidance.

In 2025, he was promoted to outside linebackers coach.

== Personal life ==
Bogardus and his wife, Lauren, have two children: a daughter, Erika, and a son, Brooks.
