= J. J. O'Brien =

American basketball player (born 1992)

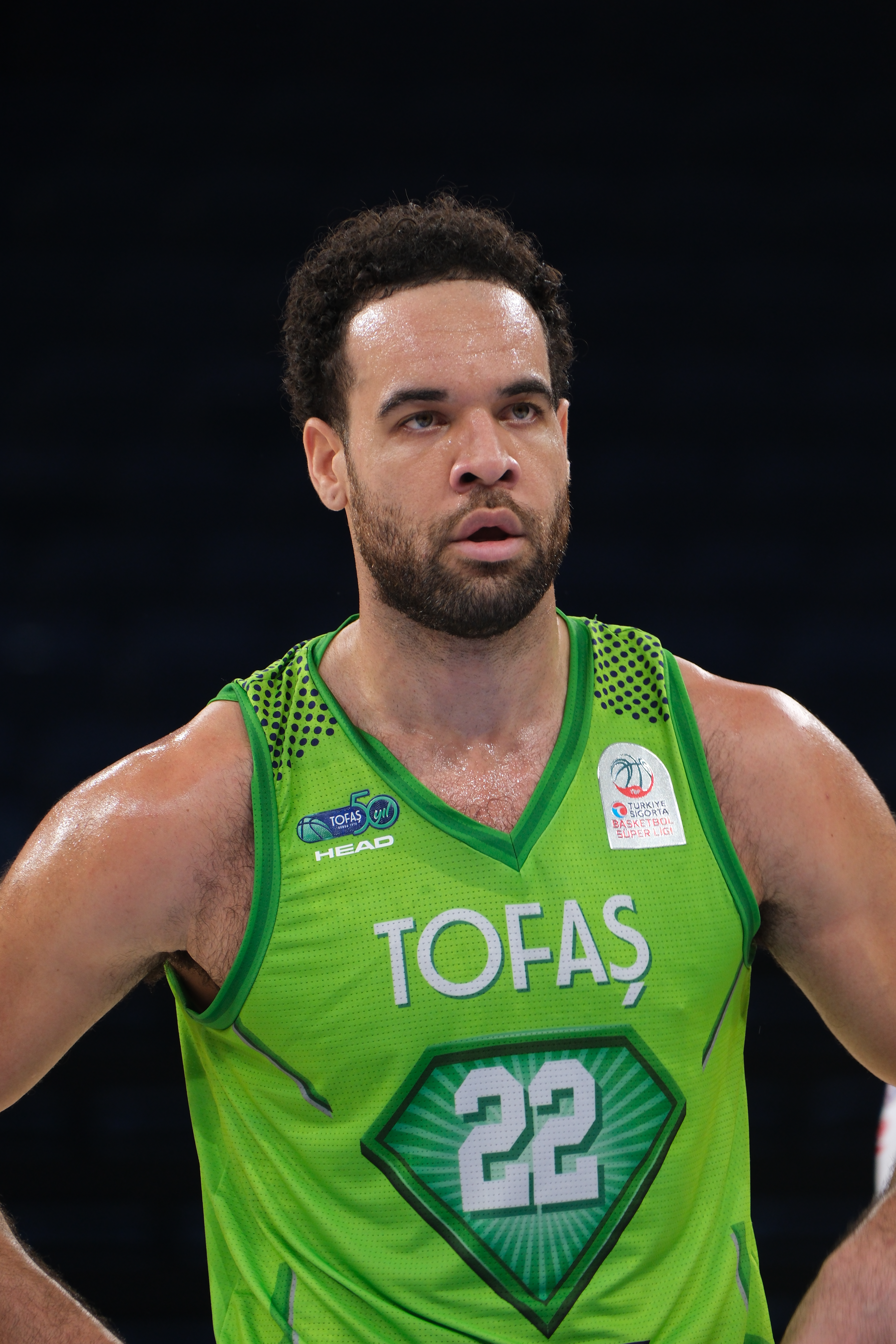
- O'Brien with the San Diego State Aztecs in 2024

Free agent
- Position: Small forward

Personal information
- Born: April 8, 1992 (age 34) San Diego, California, U.S.
- Listed height: 6 ft 7 in (2.01 m)
- Listed weight: 215 lb (98 kg)

Career information
- High school: Alta Loma (Rancho Cucamonga, California)
- College: Utah (2010–2011); San Diego State (2012–2015)
- NBA draft: 2015: undrafted
- Playing career: 2015–present

Career history
- 2015–2017: Idaho Stampede / Salt Lake City Stars
- 2016: Utah Jazz
- 2017–2018: Agua Caliente Clippers
- 2018–2019: Astana
- 2019–2021: Monaco
- 2021–2022: Nanterre 92
- 2022–2023: Budućnost VOLI
- 2023–2025: Tofaş

Career highlights
- EuroCup champion (2021); Montenegrin League champion (2023); Montenegrin Cup winner (2023); All-VTB United League Second Team (2019); NBA D-League All-Rookie Team (2016); First-team All-MWC (2015); MWC All-Defensive Team (2015)
- Stats at NBA.com
- Stats at Basketball Reference

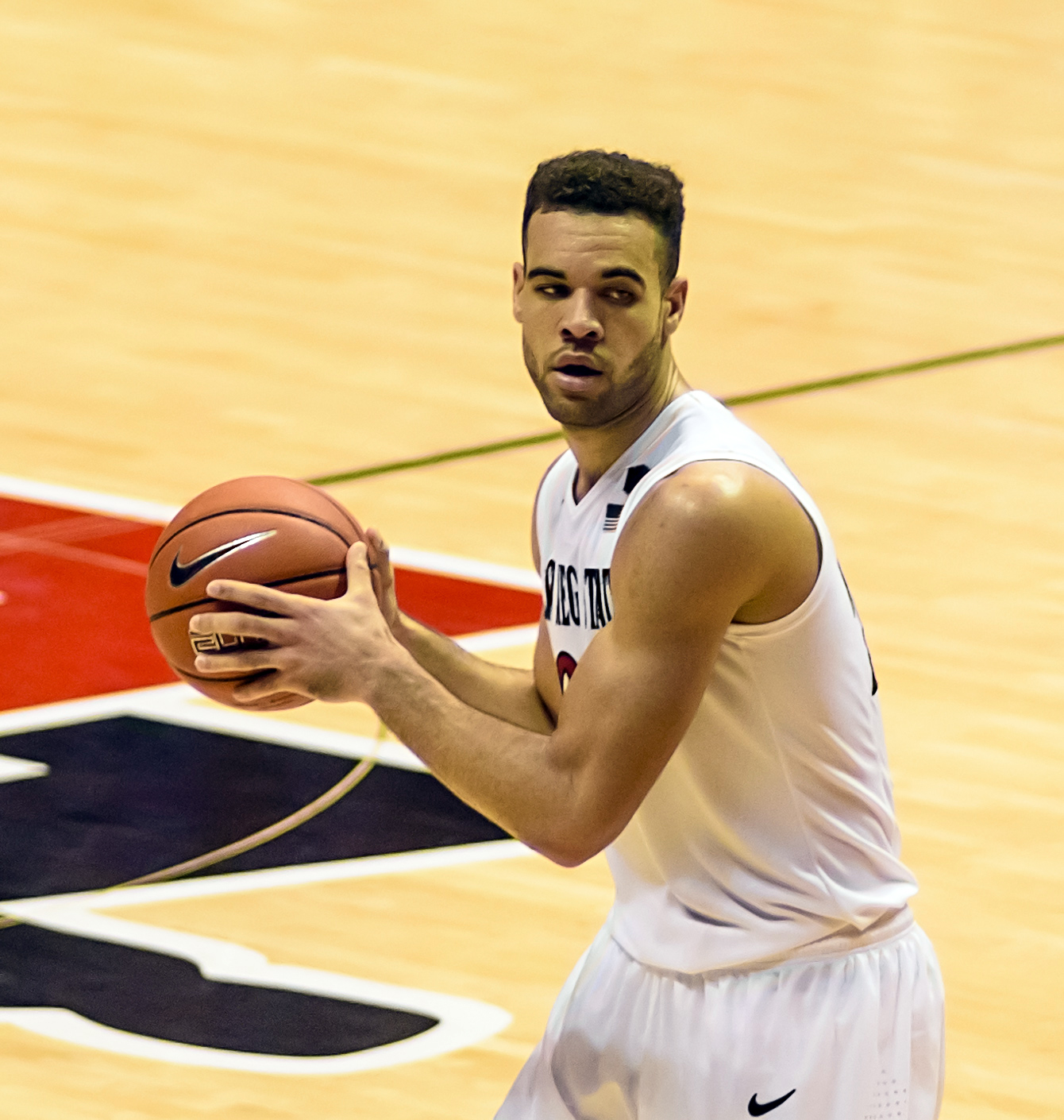

Jaleel Steven "J. J." O'Brien (born April 8, 1992) is an American professional basketball player who last played for Tofaş of Basketbol Süper Ligi (BSL). He played college basketball for the San Diego State Aztecs and the Utah Utes.

== High school career ==
O'Brien attended the Alta Loma High School in Rancho Cucamonga, California. As a senior, he averaged 24 points, 7.4 rebounds and 2.1 steals, earning a first-team all-league selection, being nominated for the McDonald's All-American and ended as Alta Loma's all-time leading scorer with 2,200 points.

== College career ==
O'Brien began his basketball career with Utah. In his freshman season, he played in 22 games starting 21 averaging 6.4 points, 5.5 rebounds and 1.2 assists in 27.7 minutes after missing 9 games due to a broken foot.

The next year, O'Brien transferred to San Diego State and sat out that season. On his sophomore season, he played in all 34 games, starting 33 averaging 7.2 points on 52.6 percent shooting, 4.5 rebounds and 1.5 assists. He scored in double figures in 10 of his final 16 outings, including six of his final 11 games, ending with 13 double-figures scoring. He was the Mountain West Player of the Week on January 28.

As a junior, O'Brien played and started 35 of 36 games averaging a career-high 7.8 points and 4.7 rebounds also setting career highs in minutes played (27.9), free-throw percentage (.644) and three-point field-goal percentage (.278). All of this earned him an All-Mountain West Honorable Mention.

As a senior with the Aztecs, O'Brien averaged 10.3 points, 5.2 rebounds and 2.4 assists.

== Professional career ==
After going undrafted in the 2015 NBA draft, O'Brien joined the Utah Jazz for the Utah Summer League, where he saw action in all three games, averaging 4.0 points and 2.3 rebounds in 13.0 minutes. He also played with Utah at the Las Vegas Summer League, owning averages of 4.6 points, 1.8 rebounds and 1.2 assists in 18.8 minutes. On August 28, 2015, he signed with the Jazz, but was later waived by the team on October 13 after appearing in one preseason game. On November 1, 2015, he was acquired by the Idaho Stampede of the NBA Development League as an affiliate player of the Jazz. On November 13, he made his professional debut in a 110–106 loss to the Rio Grande Valley Vipers, recording 12 points, three rebounds, two steals and two blocks in 42 minutes.

On January 16, 2016, O'Brien signed a 10-day contract with the Jazz. Later that night, he made his NBA debut against the Los Angeles Lakers, recording one rebound and one steal in four minutes of action.[8] On January 26, he returned to Idaho after his contract with the Jazz expired. At the season's end, he earned NBA D-League All-Rookie Team honors.

In July 2016, O'Brien re-joined the Utah Jazz for the Utah Summer League, and then played for the Brooklyn Nets at the Las Vegas Summer League. On September 8, 2016, he signed with the Milwaukee Bucks, but was waived on October 22 after appearing in five preseason games. On October 31, he was re-acquired by the now Salt Lake City Stars.

On August 23, 2017, O'Brien was selected by the Agua Caliente Clippers in the NBA G League expansion draft. He averaged 15.9 points, 4.8 rebounds and 3.1 assists per game with the Clippers.

On August 7, 2018, O'Brien signed with BC Astana in Kazakhstan.

He signed with Monaco of the LNB Pro A in 2019. O'Brien averaged 12.5 points, 3.4 rebounds and 1.7 assists per game, shooting 52% from the field and 74% from the foul line. He re-signed with the team on July 16, 2020.

On November 11, 2022, he signed with Nanterre 92 of the French Pro A.

On July 4, 2023, he signed with Tofaş of Basketbol Süper Ligi (BSL).

== Career statistics ==
Legend
GP	Games played	GS	Games started	MPG	Minutes per game
FG%	Field goal percentage	3P%	3-point field goal percentage	FT%	Free throw percentage
RPG	Rebounds per game	APG	Assists per game	SPG	Steals per game
BPG	Blocks per game	PPG	Points per game	**Bold**	Career high

Year	Team	GP	GS	MPG	FG%	3P%	FT%	RPG	APG	SPG	BPG	PPG
2015–16	Utah	2	0	3.1	.000	-	-	0.5	-	.5	-	0.0

== Personal life ==
O'Brien is the son of Catherine O'Brien, a middle school teacher who played college basketball at Notre Dame. He has two sisters, Noelle and Malika.
