= Joseph Olivier Mendo'o =

Cameroonian political scientist

- Citizenship: Cameroon
- Education: Free University of Berlin; Peking University
- Occupations: Political scientist; Afro-sinologist
- Known for: Research on China–Africa cooperation; co-founding China–Africa Youth Federation

Joseph Olivier Mendo'o is a Cameroonian political scientist and Afro-sinologist specializing in China–Africa relations. He earned his PhD in political science and international relations from Peking University in May 2023 and is recognized for his research on rural development and poverty alleviation in China, which he has studied through extensive fieldwork in Chinese villages.

== Education and career ==
Mendo'o studied at the Free University of Berlin, graduating in 2013, then returned to Cameroon in 2014, where he became interested in China after observing Chinese-built infrastructure projects. He learned Chinese at the Confucius Institute in Yaoundé, where in 2015 he also met Chinese Foreign Minister Wang Yi during an official visit to Cameroon; Wang Yi encouraged him to enrol at Peking University. Arriving in China at the end of 2015, Mendo'o enrolled at Peking University's School of International Studies, where he completed both his master's degree and doctorate in political science and international relations.

During his studies, Mendo'o served as a research assistant at the Peking University Center for African Studies (PKUCAS) and as president of the Peking University African Students Association (PUASA). He conducted extensive fieldwork in rural China, visiting more than 50 villages and 70 schools across 19 provinces to study grassroots poverty alleviation strategies. His research examines how Chinese approaches to rural revitalization might be adapted for African contexts, particularly in agriculture-based economies.

During the COVID-19 pandemic, Mendo'o chose to remain in China to volunteer alongside local communities in counties across Zhejiang and Shanxi provinces. He subsequently helped translate Chinese public health experiences into local African languages to assist youth on the continent in combating the disease.

He was appointed head of the African Youth Delegation in China in 2018 and co-founded the China–Africa Youth Federation (CAYF) in 2019. In that capacity, he led the African youth delegation at several high-profile international forums, including the International Youth Forum on South–South Cooperation in Islamabad (2017), the International Youth Summit at the Japanese Parliament in Tokyo (2018), the UN Youth Forum in the Middle East (2019), and the China–Africa Youth Festivals of 2020 and 2021 organized by the Chinese Ministry of Foreign Affairs as part of the Forum on China–Africa Cooperation (FOCAC). He also regularly appears on CCTV and CGTN to comment on developments in China–Africa relations.

In 2021, he initiated and co-authored two collective letters addressed to Chinese President Xi Jinping regarding China–Africa youth cooperation, to which Xi Jinping sent two reply letters. After completing his doctorate, he joined the China-Africa Business Council as executive director of its International Exchange Department.

== Public recognition ==
In 2023, Mendo'o was named among the 100 Most Influential People of African Descent (MIPAD 100 Under 40) by the MIPAD program, which supports the United Nations International Decade for People of African Descent, and also serves as MIPAD Country Director for China.
