= Jordan Fuller =

American football player (born 1998)

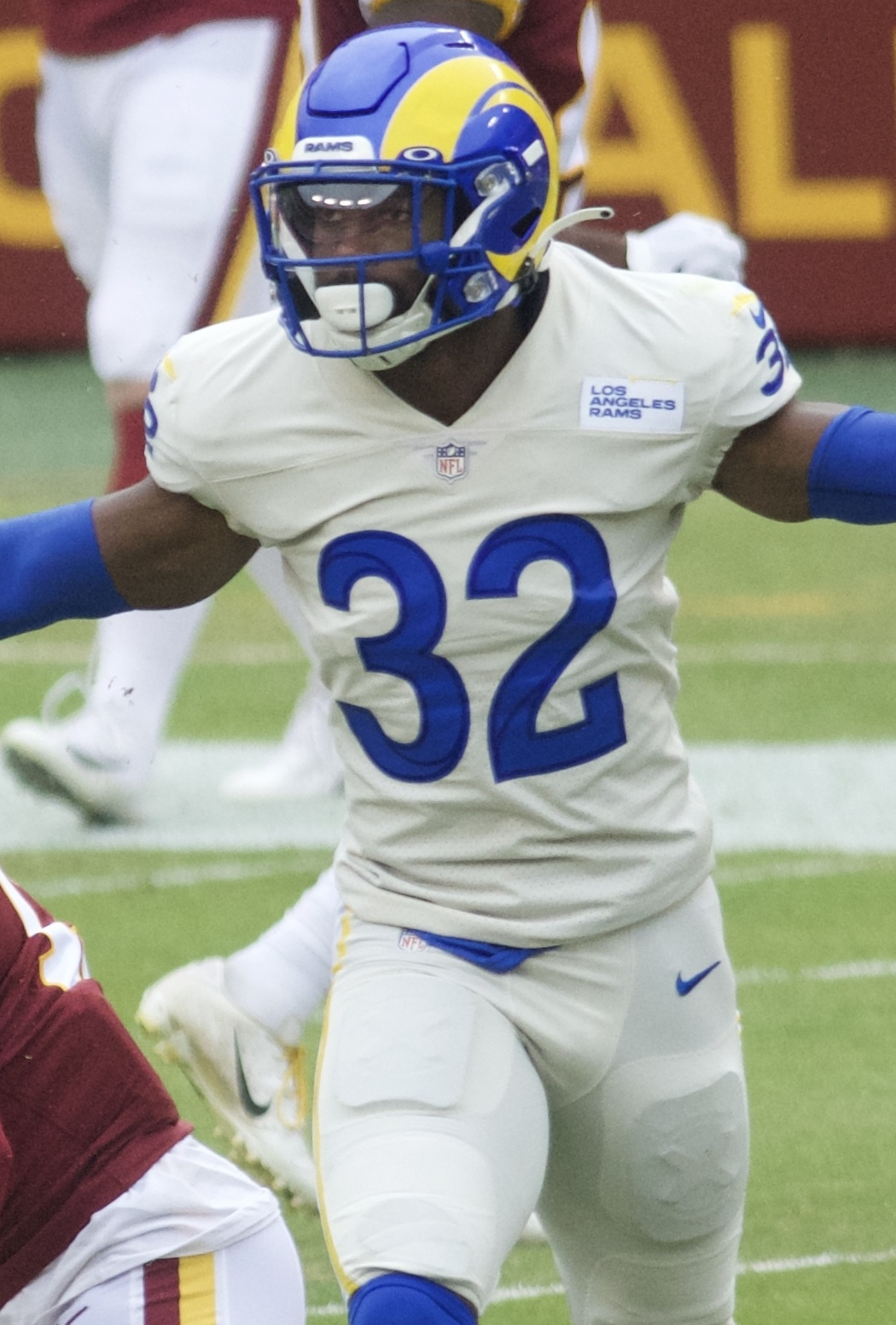
- Fuller with the Los Angeles Rams in 2020

Profile
- Position: Safety

Personal information
- Born: March 4, 1998 (age 28); Newark, New Jersey, U.S.
- Listed height: 6 ft 2 in (1.88 m)
- Listed weight: 203 lb (92 kg)

Career information
- High school: Northern Valley Regional (Old Tappan, New Jersey)
- College: Ohio State (2016–2019)
- NFL draft: 2020: 6th round, 199th overall pick

Career history
- Los Angeles Rams (2020–2023); Carolina Panthers (2024); Atlanta Falcons (2025)

Awards and highlights
- Super Bowl champion (LVI); First-team All-Big Ten (2019); Second-team All-Big Ten (2018); Third-team All-Big Ten (2017)

Career NFL statistics as of 2025
- Total tackles: 335
- Forced fumbles: 5
- Pass deflections: 18
- Interceptions: 7
- Stats at Pro Football Reference

Jordan Fuller (born March 4, 1998) is an American professional football safety. He played college football for the Ohio State Buckeyes, and was selected by the Los Angeles Rams in the sixth round of the 2020 NFL draft.

== Early life ==
Fuller was born to Bart Fuller and Cindy Mizelle on March 4, 1998. His mother is a professional touring singer who has performed with Bruce Springsteen, the Rolling Stones, Whitney Houston and Luther Vandross, among others. He grew up in Norwood, New Jersey and attended Northern Valley Regional High School at Old Tappan. He played multiple positions for the Golden Knights and was named the Gatorade Player of the Year for New Jersey and the State Player of the Year by NJ.com as a senior after rushing for 747 yards and 10 touchdowns, catching 33 passes for 886 yards and five touchdowns and throwing for 135 yards on offense and making 44 tackles and intercepting six passes on defense.

== College career ==
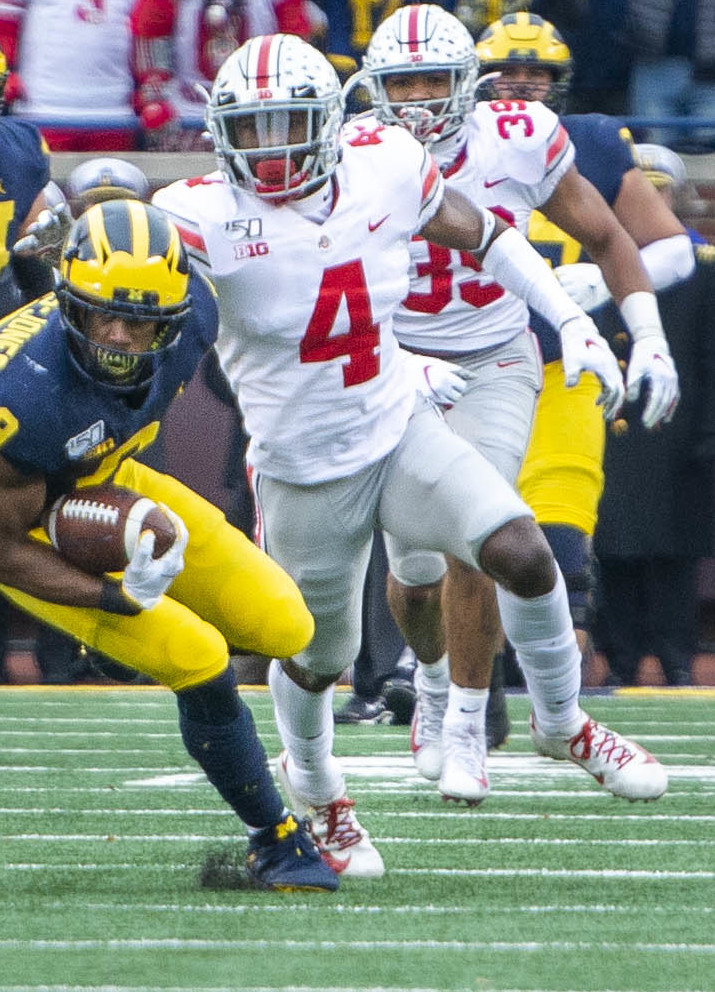
Fuller playing for Ohio State in 2019

Fuller played in all 13 of the Buckeyes games as a true freshman, playing mostly on special teams with 71 snaps played on defense and making 11 tackles. Fuller was named Ohio State's starting safety going into his sophomore year, replacing Malik Hooker. He finished the season with 70 tackles, including a team-leading 57 solo stops, two tackles for loss and two interceptions and was named third-team All-Big Ten Conference and was named a Big Ten Distinguished Scholar.

Fuller was named a team captain going into his junior year. He recorded 81 tackles, second highest on the team, with one interception, four passes broken up and two fumble recoveries. He was named second-team All-Big Ten by the league's coaches and honorable mention by the media and was named an Academic All-American. Fuller entered his senior season on the Jim Thorpe Award and Bronko Nagurski Trophy watchlists and was named a second-team preseason All-American by the Associated Press. Fuller was named a semifinalist for the Jason Witten Man of the Year award and the Lott IMPACT Trophy and a finalist for the William V. Campbell Trophy. Fuller was named first-team All-Big Ten after finishing the season with 62 tackles, two interceptions, four pass break-ups, and recovered a fumble.

== Professional career ==
=== Pre-draft ===
NFL.com lead draft analyst Lance Zierlein projected that Fuller would be a seventh round pick or a priority undrafted free agent. NFL draft analyst Matt Miller of Bleacher Report had Fuller ranked as the 20th best safety prospect available in the 2020 NFL Draft. NFL draft analysts projected him to be drafted as early as the fifth-round to possibly as late as the seventh-round of the 2020 NFL Draft.

External videos
- 2020 Draft Prospects: Jordan Fuller
- Inside the Draft: Jordan Fuller

"He was one of my favorite guys in the draft. I tried to convey that as emotionally as I could. There are some scouts who are excellent presenters. … I’m more analytical, more introverted. So it was about being more firm. Yes, this guy is the top safety. Yes, I would take him. Yes, I love this guy. Yes, I want him (to be a Ram). A couple of years later, I’m the Midwest scout. … (Jordan) played a little as a freshman and then ended up starting three years at Ohio State. He is just so smart. Our (defensive backs) coaches — Ejiro Evero and Aubrey Pleasant — those two are smart guys. They always talk about how you only have one chance to find the right angle, and that’s Jordan. He plays with excellent angles. He gets to the football. His range — he’s a big dude, he’s 6-foot-2 and he covers ground, eats up stripes — and he was just always in the right position all the time."

— Brian Hill (Rams' Mid-west area scout)

Pre-draft measurables
Height	Weight	Arm length	Hand span	40-yard dash	10-yard split	20-yard split	20-yard shuttle	Vertical jump	Broad jump
6 ft 1 7/8 in (1.88 m)	203 lb (92 kg)	31 in (0.79 m)	9 in (0.23 m)	4.67 s	1.62 s	2.75 s	4.27 s	35.5 in (0.90 m)	10 ft 2 in (3.10 m)
All values from NFL Combine

=== Los Angeles Rams ===
The Los Angeles Rams selected Fuller in the sixth round (199th overall) of the 2020 NFL draft. He was the 17th safety drafted in 2020.

External videos
- Rams select Jordan Fuller No. 199
- Jordan Fuller called by Les Snead

"Going into the draft, we really felt strongly about needing a third safety at minimum. Lot of scrutiny put on that position. I think from the very beginning, Jordan was a guy who stood out. When you play in that type of (single-safety) scheme, that player is very valuable. It’s kind of that Earl Thomas role in Seattle that he made famous. There’s a lot of trust put in that player. So Jordan is a guy who stood out by his features (and) length, and he has a really dynamic play style. He’s always in his stance, always in good position. Plays the game with a lot of intensity. The guy is always running to the football at a high speed. He takes really good angles. And the way we play, our defense, we are looking for safeties who can play in the deep part of the field. We are not looking for strong safeties because we view those guys as linebackers. We want guys who can operate in the deep part of the field. He’s an ideal scheme fit for us.”

— Brandon Staley (Rams' defensive coordinator)

==== 2020 ====
On July 28, 2020, the Los Angeles Rams signed Fuller to a four–year, $3.46 million rookie contract that included an initial signing bonus of $170,712.

Throughout training camp, he competed against Nick Scott and fellow rookie Terrell Burgess to be the starting free safety after it became available following an injury to Taylor Rapp and Eric Weddle choosing to opt out and skip the season due to COVID-19. Head coach Sean McVay named Fuller the starting free safety to begin the season and paired him with John Johnson.

On September 13, 2020, Fuller made his professional regular season debut and earned his first career start during the Los Angeles Rams' home-opener against the Dallas Cowboys and made a team-high eight combined tackles (five solo) as they won 20–17. The following week, he collected a season-high nine combined tackles (five solo) during a 37–19 win at the Philadelphia Eagles in Week 2. In Week 3, Fuller exited during the first quarter of a 32–35 loss at the Buffalo Bills after injuring his shoulder and was subsequently inactive for the Rams' 17–9 victory against the New York Giants in Week 4. On October 13, 2020, the Rams officially placed him on injured reserve due to his shoulder injury and he was inactive for three games (Weeks 6–8). On November 14, 2020, the Rams removed him from injured reserve and added him back to their active roster. On November 23, 2020, Fuller made four solo tackles, tied his season-high of two pass deflections, and set a career-high with two interceptions to secure a 27–24 win at the Tampa Bay Buccaneers on Monday Night Football. He had the first interception of his career on a pass attempt thrown by Tom Brady to wide receiver Chris Godwin during the third quarter and returned it for 37–yards. The following week, he made four combined tackles (one solo), made a pass deflection, and intercepted a pass by Nick Mullens to wide receiver Deebo Samuel as the Rams lost 20–23 against the San Francisco 49ers in Week 12. He finished his rookie season with a total of 60 combined tackles (43 solo), five pass deflections, and three interceptions in 12 games and 12 starts. He earned an overall grade of 65.6 from Pro Football Focus as a rookie in 2020.

The Los Angeles Rams finished the 2020 NFL season second in the NFC West with a 10–6 record to clinch a Wildcard berth. On January 9, 2021, Fuller earned a start in his first career postseason game and recorded seven combined tackles (four solo) during a 30–20 victory at the Seattle Seahawks in the NFC Wild-card Game. The following week, he recorded five combined tackles (three solo) as the Rams lost 18–32 at the Green Bay Packers in the Divisional Round to be eliminated from the playoffs.

==== 2021 ====
On January 21, 2021, the Los Angeles Rams announced the hiring of Raheem Morris as the defensive coordinator following the departure of Brandon Staley, who accepted a head coaching position with the Los Angeles Chargers. During training camp, Fuller competed in an open competition against Taylor Rapp, John Johnson III, Nick Scott, Terrell Burgess, Jovan Grant, Troy Warner, and Paris Ford for a starting position at either safety role. Head coach Sean McVay named Fuller the starting strong safety to begin the season and paired him with free safety Taylor Rapp.

In Week 6, he collected a season-high 11 combined tackles (eight solo) as the Rams won 38–11 at the New York Giants. On November 28, 2021, Fuller made seven combined tackles (three solo) and set a season-high with two pass deflections during a 28–36 loss at the Green Bay Packers. On December 15, 2021, the Rams officially placed him on the COVID-19/reserve list, subsequently making him inactive for a 20–10 win against the Seattle Seahawks in Week 15. On December 24, 2021, the Rams removed Fuller from the COVID-19/reserve list and added him back to the active roster. On January 2, 2022, Fuller made six combined tackles (three solo), a pass deflection, and had his only interception of the season on a pass by Tyler Huntley to wide receiver Marquise Brown during a 20–19 win at the Baltimore Ravens. He finished the season with a career-high 113 combined tackles (63 solo), four pass deflections, and one interception in 16 games and 16 starts. He received an overall grade of 74.3 from Pro Football Focus, which ranked 20th among all safeties in 2021 and was a career-high overall grade for Fuller.

On January 12, 2022, the Rams officially placed him on injured reserve due to an ankle injury he suffered during a 24–27 overtime loss against the San Francisco 49ers in Week 18. The Los Angeles Rams finished the 2021 NFL season a top the NFC West with a 12–5 record, clinching a playoff berth. In his absence, the Rams went on to defeat the Arizona Cardinals 34–11 in the Wild-Card Game, won 30–27 at the Tampa Bay Buccaneers in the Divisional Round, and defeated the San Francisco 49ers 20–17 during the NFC Championship Game. On February 13, 2022, the Los Angeles Rams defeated the Cincinnati Bengals 23–20 to win Super Bowl LVI, earning Fuller his first and only career Super Bowl ring.

==== 2022 ====
During training camp, he competed for a role as a starting safety against Taylor Rapp and Nick Scott. Head coach Sean McVay named Fuller a backup safety to start the season, behind starting safeties Nick Scott with Taylor Rapp.

In Week 2, Fuller collected a season-high eight combined tackles (six solo) during a 31–17 win against the Atlanta Falcons. He was inactive during a 20–12 win at the Arizona Cardinals in Week 3 due to a hamstring injury. On October 8, 2022, the Los Angeles Rams officially placed Fuller on injured reserve due to his hamstring injury. He finished the 2022 NFL season with 12 combined tackles (nine solo) in three games and one start and was inactive for the last 13 games (Weeks 5–18) of the season.

==== 2023 ====
Throughout training camp, Fuller competed to be a starting safety against Russ Yeast and Quentin Lake following the departures of Taylor Rapp and Nick Scott. Head coach Sean McVay named him the starting strong safety to begin the season and paired him with free safety Russ Yeast.

On October 8, 2023, he racked up a career-high 12 combined tackles (seven solo) and broke up a pass as the Rams lost 14–23 to the Philadelphia Eagles. In Week 12, Fuller made three combined tackles (two solo) and set a career-high with four pass deflections during a 37–14 victory at the Arizona Cardinals. On December 21, 2023, Fuller recorded two solo tackles, made one pass deflection, and intercepted a pass thrown by Derek Carr to wide receiver Juwan Johnson as the Rams defeated the New Orleans Saints 30–22. The following week, he recorded eight combined tackles (seven solo), made a pass deflection, and tied his career-high of three interceptions on a pass thrown by Tyrod Taylor to wide receiver Darius Slayton during a 26–25 win at the New York Giants in Week 17. He started all 17 games for the first time in his career and had a total of 91 combined tackles (63 solo), eight pass deflections, and tied his career-high of three interceptions. He received an overall grade of 67.9 from Pro Football Focus.

=== Carolina Panthers ===
==== 2024 ====
On March 15, 2024, the Carolina Panthers signed Fuller to a one–year, $3.25 million contract that includes $3.05 million guaranteed upon signing and an initial signing bonus of $1.93 million. It reunited him with defensive coordinator Ejiro Evero, who previously coached him as the Los Angeles Rams safeties coach and pass game coordinator (2017–2021), and also reunited him with former Rams' teammate Nick Scott (2019–2022).

He entered training camp slated as the de facto starting free safety following the departure of Vonn Bell. Head coach Dave Canales named him the starting free safety to begin the season and paired him with strong safety Xavier Woods.

On September 8, 2024, Fuller made his debut with the Carolina Panthers in their season-opener at the New Orleans Saints and made seven combined tackles (four solo) as they lost 10–47. On September 24, 2024, the Panthers officially placed him on injured reserve due to a hamstring injury. On November 9, 2024, the Panthers removed Fuller from injured reserve and placed him back onto the active roster after he missed six consecutive games (Weeks 4-9). In Week 15, Fuller collected a season-high nine combined tackles (four solo) as the Panthers lost 14–30 against the Dallas Cowboys. He was inactive as a healthy scratch for two games (Weeks 16-17). He finished the 2024 NFL season with a total of 54 combined tackles (28 solo) and one pass deflection in nine games and nine starts. He received an overall grade of 53.8 from Pro Football Focus, which ranked 135th among 170 qualifying safeties in 2024.

=== Atlanta Falcons ===
==== 2025 ====
On March 20, 2025, the Atlanta Falcons signed Fuller to a one-year, $1.33 million contract that includes a signing bonus of $80,000. Fuller suffered a knee injury in Atlanta's Week 2 game against the Minnesota Vikings, a malady that caused him to be placed on injured reserve on September 13. He was activated on October 25, ahead of the team's Week 8 matchup against the Miami Dolphins. In six appearances for the team, he recorded two combined tackles. Fuller was released by the Falcons on December 8, and re-signed to the practice squad.

== NFL career statistics ==
Legend
**Bold**	Career high

=== Regular season ===
Year	Team	Games		Tackling				Fumbles			Interceptions					
Year	Team	GP	GS	Comb	Solo	Ast	Sck	FF	FR	Yds	Int	Yds	Avg	Lng	TD	PD
2020	LAR	12	12	60	42	18	0.0	0	0	0	**3**	**45**	15.0	**37**	0	5
2021	LAR	16	16	**113**	**63**	**50**	0.0	0	0	0	1	34	**34.0**	34	0	4
2022	LAR	3	1	12	9	3	0.0	1	0	0	0	0	0.0	0	0	0
2023	LAR	17	17	94	61	33	0.0	**3**	0	0	**3**	39	13.0	21	0	**8**
Career		48	46	279	175	104	0.0	4	0	0	7	118	16.8	37	0	17

=== Postseason ===
Year	Team	Games		Tackling				Fumbles			Interceptions					
Year	Team	GP	GS	Comb	Solo	Ast	Sck	FF	FR	Yds	Int	Yds	Avg	Lng	TD	PD
2020	LAR	2	2	**12**	**7**	**5**	0.0	0	0	0	0	0	0.0	0	0	0
Career		2	2	12	7	5	0.0	0	0	0	0	0	0.0	0	0	0

== Personal life ==
Fuller's older brother, Devin Fuller, played college football at UCLA and spent two seasons with the Atlanta Falcons. He is the nephew of comedian Sinbad.
