= Eric Weddle =

American football player (born 1985)

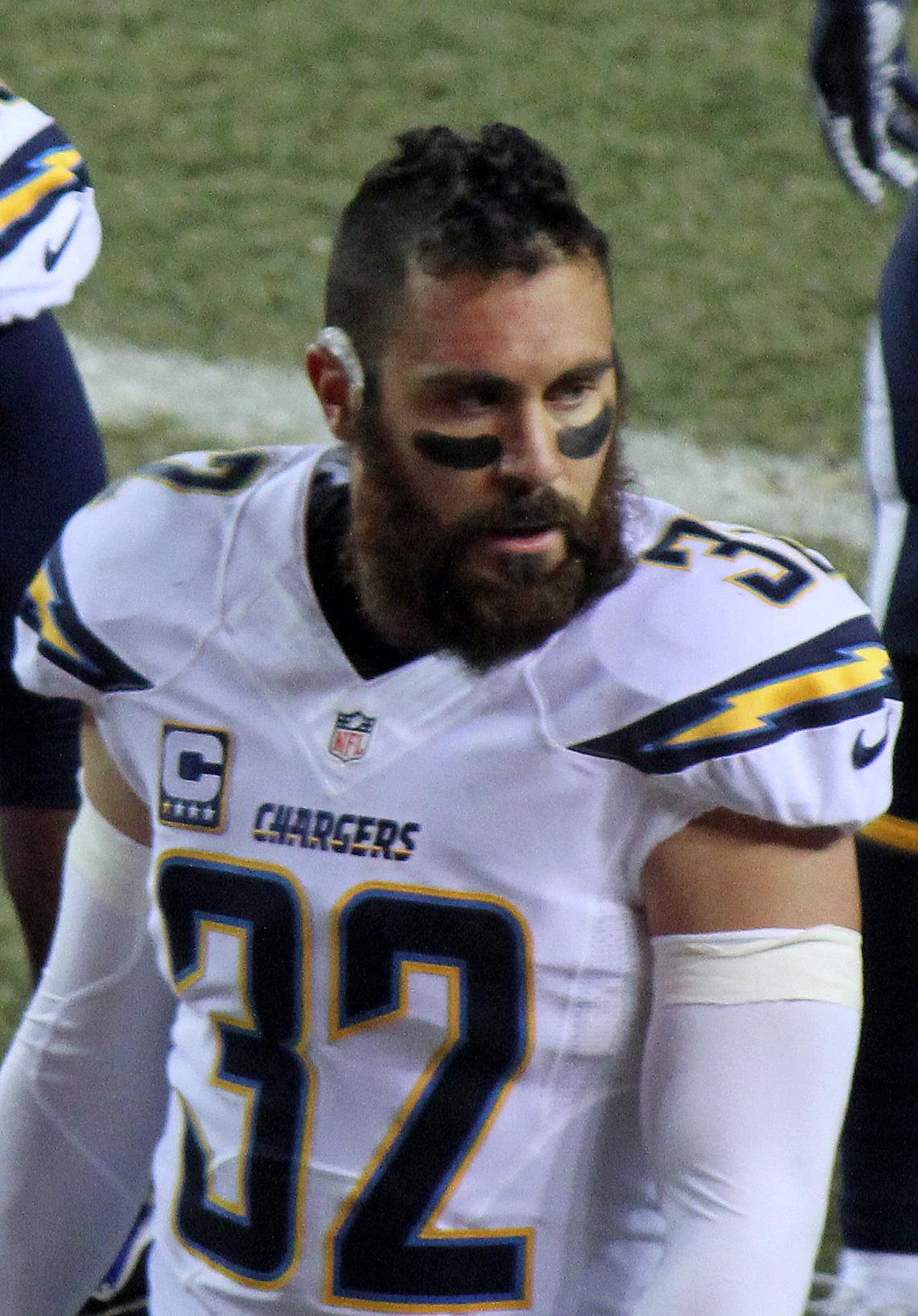
- Weddle with the San Diego Chargers in 2013

No. 32, 20
- Position: Safety

Personal information
- Born: January 4, 1985 (age 41); Fontana, California, U.S.
- Listed height: 5 ft 11 in (1.80 m)
- Listed weight: 195 lb (88 kg)

Career information
- High school: Alta Loma (Rancho Cucamonga, California)
- College: Utah (2003–2006)
- NFL draft: 2007: 2nd round, 37th overall pick

Career history
- San Diego Chargers (2007–2015); Baltimore Ravens (2016–2018); Los Angeles Rams (2019, 2021)

Awards and highlights
- Super Bowl champion (LVI); 2× First-team All-Pro (2011, 2014); 3× Second-team All-Pro (2010, 2012, 2013); 6× Pro Bowl (2011, 2013, 2014, 2016–2018); NFL interceptions co-leader (2011); NFL 2010s All-Decade Team; Consensus All-American (2006); 2× MW Defensive Player of the Year (2005, 2006); 2× First-team All-MW (2005, 2006); Second-team All-MW (2004)

Career NFL statistics
- Total tackles: 1,179
- Sacks: 9.5
- Forced fumbles: 8
- Fumble recoveries: 7
- Pass deflections: 98
- Interceptions: 29
- Defensive touchdowns: 5
- Stats at Pro Football Reference
- College Football Hall of Fame

Eric Steven Weddle (born January 4, 1985) is an American former professional football safety who played in the National Football League (NFL) for 14 seasons. He played college football for the Utah Utes, earning consensus All-American honors, and was selected by the San Diego Chargers in the second round of the 2007 NFL draft. During his nine seasons with the Chargers, Weddle received three Pro Bowl and two first-team All-Pro selections.

Weddle spent his next three seasons as a member of the Baltimore Ravens, earning Pro Bowl honors in each and extending his total selections to six. He retired after playing for the Los Angeles Rams in 2019, but returned two years later to join the Rams on their 2021–22 playoff run, which culminated with a victory in Super Bowl LVI. Following the championship, he retired a second time.

== Early life ==
Weddle was born and raised in Fontana, California. He grew up in Alta Loma, California, and attended local Alta Loma High School. At Alta Loma High, he lettered in football, basketball, and baseball. In football, he was a three-time all-league selection and a two-time All-CIF selection.

Weddle added first-team all-area accolades from the Los Angeles Times and the Inland Valley Daily Bulletin. A second-team All-Southern Section honoree, he also received all-region honors from Rivals.com and Student Sport Magazine. He was named the team's best receiver and most valuable player as a senior.

The team captain had 129 tackles, five interceptions, four forced fumbles and five recovered fumbles on defense, adding 587 yards rushing, 22 touchdowns, 965 yards passing and five scoring tosses as a senior. He led Alta Loma High to the 2000 Mt. Baldy League championship.

== College career ==
Weddle enrolled in the University of Utah, where he played for the Utes from 2003 to 2006. He was immediately put into action in 2003, starting his last nine games at right cornerback. He earned Freshman All-American first-team and All-Mountain West Conference honorable mention. He posted 60 tackles (29 solos) with four sacks, four forced fumbles and a fumble recovery. He deflected four passes and intercepted another while also carrying the ball once (minus 6 yards). Weddle was a 2-time Mountain West Conference defensive player of the year.

In 2004, Weddle shifted to strong safety, starting eleven games. Despite sitting out the Arizona clash with a right knee sprain, he ranked third on the team with 75 tackles (47 solos). He added one sack, 4.5 stops behind the line of scrimmage and a forced fumble. He advanced a fumble recovery 31 yards, batted away five passes and intercepted four others. He also averaged 10.5 yards on 20 punt returns.

Weddle earned Mountain West Conference Defensive Player of the Year, first-team All-MWC, second-team All-American and Emerald Bowl Defensive MVP honors in 2005. He started all twelve games, lining up at strong safety in five contests, at left cornerback in four and as a nickel back in three others. He ranked third on the team with 78 tackles (49 solos) and second with eleven stops for losses. He had four sacks, three forced fumbles and a fumble recovery. He led the conference with sixteen passes defensed (12 break-ups, 4 interceptions). He punted twice for 46 yards, attempted two passes and averaged 6.4 yards on 24 punt returns. He also rushed seven times for 35 yards and one touchdown.

In 2006, Weddle was a consensus All-American and unanimous All-MWC first-team choice. He was again named the conference's Defensive Player of the Year. He started the team's first two games at strong safety before shifting to left cornerback and closed out the season as the nickel back. He made 64 tackles (40 solos) with a sack, a forced fumble and 2.5 stops for losses. He returned one of three fumble recoveries for a touchdown, deflected two passes and ranked eighth in the nation with seven interceptions. He averaged 5.5 yards on eight punt returns and completed 2-of-4 passes for 43 yards and a touchdown. He also carried 44 times for 203 yards (4.6 avg) and five scores.

In 48 games at Utah, Weddle started 45 times (9 at right cornerback, 12 at left cornerback, 6 at nickel back, 18 at strong safety). He recorded 277 tackles, as his 165 solo hits rank sixth in school annals. He produced ten sacks for minus 69 yards and 22.5 stops for losses of 108 yards. He set the school career record with nine forced fumbles and ranks sixth with six fumble recoveries, returning two for 66 yards and a touchdown.

Weddle is tied for sixth in Utah history with 23 pass deflections and ranks second (MWC record) with 18 interceptions for 148 yards (8.2 avg) in returns. His three pass thefts returned for touch-downs rank second in school annals. He ranks fifth on the school record books with 52 punt returns, good for 408 yards (7.8 avg).

On offense, Weddle rushed 52 times for 259 yards (5.0 avg) and six touchdowns. He completed 2-of-6 passes for 43 yards, one touchdown and an interception. He recovered an onside kick and also punted twice for 46 yards with a long of 34.

Nearing the end of an electrifying senior year, Doug Robinson of the Deseret Morning News wrote an article championing Weddle for the Heisman Trophy based on how valuable he is to the Utah Utes. He wrote, "The only people who spend more time on the field than Weddle each Saturday are referees. Against Air Force two weeks ago, Weddle played every snap on defense and collected eight tackles. On offense, he led the Utes in rushing with 73 yards and scored Utah's only two touchdowns. He also served as the holder for the game-winning field goal. He played a total of 90 plays." Robinson wrote that Fisher DeBerry, Air Force's football head coach told Weddle after the game, "They're cheating you, son; they ought to give you two scholarships." Wyoming coach Joe Glenn said, "He should win the Heisman Trophy... I sincerely mean that."

On January 14, 2026, Weddle was inducted into the College Football Hall of Fame.

== Professional career ==
During the 2007 combine, Weddle ran a 1.43 10 yard time, tying him with Aundrae Allison and Marcus McCauley for the then fastest split time recorded at the NFL combine.

External videos
- Eric Weddle's NFL Combine Workout

Pre-draft measurables
Height	Weight	Arm length	Hand span	40-yard dash	10-yard split	20-yard split	20-yard shuttle	Three-cone drill	Vertical jump	Broad jump	Bench press	Wonderlic
5 ft 11 1/4 in (1.81 m)	203 lb (92 kg)	30 5/8 in (0.78 m)	9 5/8 in (0.24 m)	4.56 s	1.58 s	2.64 s	4.12 s	6.78 s	33.5 in (0.85 m)	9 ft 5 in (2.87 m)	11 reps	27
All values from NFL Combine

=== San Diego Chargers ===
==== 2007 season ====
The San Diego Chargers selected Weddle in the second round (37th overall) of the 2007 NFL draft. The Chargers traded their second round pick (62nd overall), third round pick (93rd overall), and fifth round pick (167th overall) in the 2007 NFL Draft, as well as their third round pick (90th overall) in the 2008 NFL draft to the Chicago Bears in order to move up in the second round and draft Weddle. The Chicago Bears used their selections to draft Dan Bazuin, Garrett Wolfe, Kevin Payne, and Marcus Harrison. Weddle was the fifth safety drafted in 2007.

On July 23, 2007, the Chargers signed Weddle to a four-year, $4.16 million contract that includes $3.47 million guaranteed and a signing bonus of $1.81 million.

Throughout training camp, Weddle competed against Clinton Hart to be the starting strong safety. Head coach Norv Turner officially named Weddle the backup strong safety to begin the regular season, behind Clinton Hart. Defensive coordinator Ted Cottrell also used Weddle as a nickelback during his rookie season.

Weddle made his NFL regular season debut in the season-opener against the Chicago Bears and recorded three solo tackles and made his first NFL sack on quarterback Rex Grossman in a 14–3 victory. On October 28, 2007, Weddle recorded five combined tackles, broke up a pass, and made his first NFL interception in a 35–10 victory against the Houston Texans in Week 8. He made his interception off a pass attempt by quarterback Matt Schaub in the third quarter. Weddle was inactive for the Chargers' Week 11 loss at the Jacksonville Jaguars after suffering an injury the previous week. In Week 17, he collected a season-high six combined tackles during a 30–17 victory at the Oakland Raiders.

Weddle finished his rookie season with 53 combined tackles (42 solo), six pass deflections, a sack, and an interception in 15 games and zero starts.

The Chargers finished atop the AFC West with an 11–5 record. On January 6, 2008, Weddle appeared in his first NFL playoff game as the Chargers defeated the Tennessee Titans 17–6 in the AFC Wildcard Game. The following week, he collected five combined tackles, a pass deflection, and intercepted a pass attempt by quarterback Peyton Manning in a 28–24 victory at the Indianapolis Colts in the AFC Divisional Round. On January 20, 2008, Weddle recorded seven combined tackles as the Chargers lost 21–12 at the New England Patriots in the AFC Championship Game.

==== 2008 season ====
Weddle entered training camp slated as the starting free safety after Clinton Hart was moved to strong safety. Hart replaced veteran Marlon McCree, who was released during the offseason. Head coach Norv Turner named Weddle and Hart the starters to begin the regular season.

Weddle made his first NFL start in the season-opener against the Carolina Panthers and recorded a season-high 11 combined tackles (seven solo) and deflected a pass in their 26–24 loss. On September 22, 2008, Weddle recorded seven combined tackles, a pass deflection, and intercepted a pass by Brett Favre during a 48–29 victory on Monday Night Football against the New York Jets in a Week 3. In Week 7, he collected a season-high 11 solo tackles in the Chargers' 30–10 victory against the New England Patriots. On December 28, 2008, Weddle tied his season-high of 11 combined tackles (ten solo) and broke up a pass in a 52–21 win against the Denver Broncos in Week 17. His 11 combined tackles in their season finale marked his eighth game of the season with at least ten combined tackles.

Weddle finished the season with a career-high 127 combined tackles (105 solo), five pass deflections, a sack, and an interception in 16 games and 16 starts.

The Chargers finished atop their division with an 8–8 record and clinched a wildcard berth. On January 3, 2009, Weddle made seven combined tackles and three pass deflections in the Chargers' 23–17 victory against the Indianapolis Colts in the AFC Wildcard Game. The following week, he collected 11 combined tackles (nine solo) and sacked Ben Roethlisberger during a 35–24 loss at the Pittsburgh Steelers in the AFC Divisional Round.

==== 2009 season ====
Defensive coordinator Ron Rivera retained Weddle and Hart as the starting safety duo to begin the 2009 regular season. The Chargers established a secondary that included cornerbacks Antonio Cromartie, Quentin Jammer, and Antoine Cason.

On September 20, 2009, Weddle collected a season-high ten combined tackles (nine solo) during a 31–26 loss to the Baltimore Ravens in Week 2. The following week, Weddle recorded seven combined tackles, a pass deflection, and returned an interception for his first career touchdown in a 23–13 win against the Miami Dolphins in Week 3. Weddle intercepted a pass by quarterback Chad Henne, that was intended for wide receiver Davone Bess, and returned it for a 31-yard touchdown in the fourth quarter. He injured his knee during a Week 12 victory against the Kansas City Chiefs and was sidelined for the next two games (Weeks 13–14). Head coach Norv Turner opted to rest Weddle for the playoffs and listed him as inactive for their Week 17 victory against the Washington Redskins.

Weddle finished the 2009 season with 82 combined tackles (78 solo), seven passes defensed, two interceptions, 1.5 sacks, and a touchdown in 13 games and 13 starts.

The San Diego Chargers finished atop the AFC West with a 13–3 record and received home-field advantage and a first round bye. On January 17, 2010, Weddle sacked quarterback Mark Sanchez in a 17–14 loss against the New York Jets in the AFC Divisional Round.

==== 2010 season ====
Weddle entered training camp slated as the starting free safety. Head coach Norv Turner retained Weddle as the starter to begin the regular season, along with Steve Gregory. On November 28, 2010, Weddle recorded four solo tackles, a season-high two pass deflections, and returned an interception for a touchdown during a 36–14 victory at the Indianapolis Colts in Week 12. He returned an interception by quarterback Peyton Manning, that was intended for wide receiver Reggie Wayne, in the third quarter. In Week 17, he collected a career-high 16 combined tackles (11 solo) and deflected a pass in a 34–20 loss at the Cincinnati Bengals. He finished his fourth season in the league with 96 combined tackles (80 solo), ten pass deflections, two interceptions, a touchdown, and was credited with half a sack in 16 games and 16 starts. Pro Football Focus gave Weddle an overall grade of +12.6 in 2010.

==== 2011 season ====
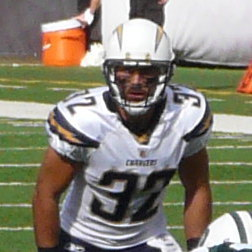
Weddle in 2011

Weddle became an unrestricted free agent for the first time in his career after the 2010 NFL season and was ranked as the second best free agent safety on the market, behind Quintin Mikell, by Pro Football Focus. He received serious interest from multiple teams, including the Cincinnati Bengals, Tampa Bay Buccaneers, Denver Broncos, Carolina Panthers, Minnesota Vikings, Dallas Cowboys, and Houston Texans. He stated during an interview that his top priority was to come to an agreement with the San Diego Chargers. Weddle was heavily recruited by the Texans, but stated he'd only consider signing with the Cowboys, Panthers, Jaguars, and Vikings if he was unable to come to terms with the Chargers.

On July 28, 2011, the San Diego Chargers signed Weddle to a five-year, $40 million contract with $19 million guaranteed and a signing bonus of $13 million.

The Chargers' new defensive coordinator Greg Manusky opted to retain Weddle as the starting free safety to start the regular season, along with strong safety Bob Sanders. In Week 2, Weddle recorded a season-high 11 combined tackles (eight solo) in a 35–21 loss at the New England Patriots. On October 31, 2011, he made seven solo tackles, two pass deflections, and intercepted two pass attempts by quarterback Matt Cassel in the Chargers' 23–20 overtime loss at the Kansas City Chiefs in Week 8. His performance marked the first game of his career with multiple interceptions. In Week 14, he made three combined tackles, a pass deflection, and recorded his seventh interception of the season in a 37–10 win against the Buffalo Bills. On December 26, 2011, Weddle was voted to play in the 2012 Pro Bowl, marking the first selection of his career.

Weddle finished the season with 88 combined tackles (70 solo), 11 passes defensed, and a career-high seven interceptions in 16 games and 16 starts. On January 29, 2012, he appeared in the 2012 Pro Bowl as part of the AFC and made two interceptions in their 59–41 loss to the NFC.

==== 2012 season ====
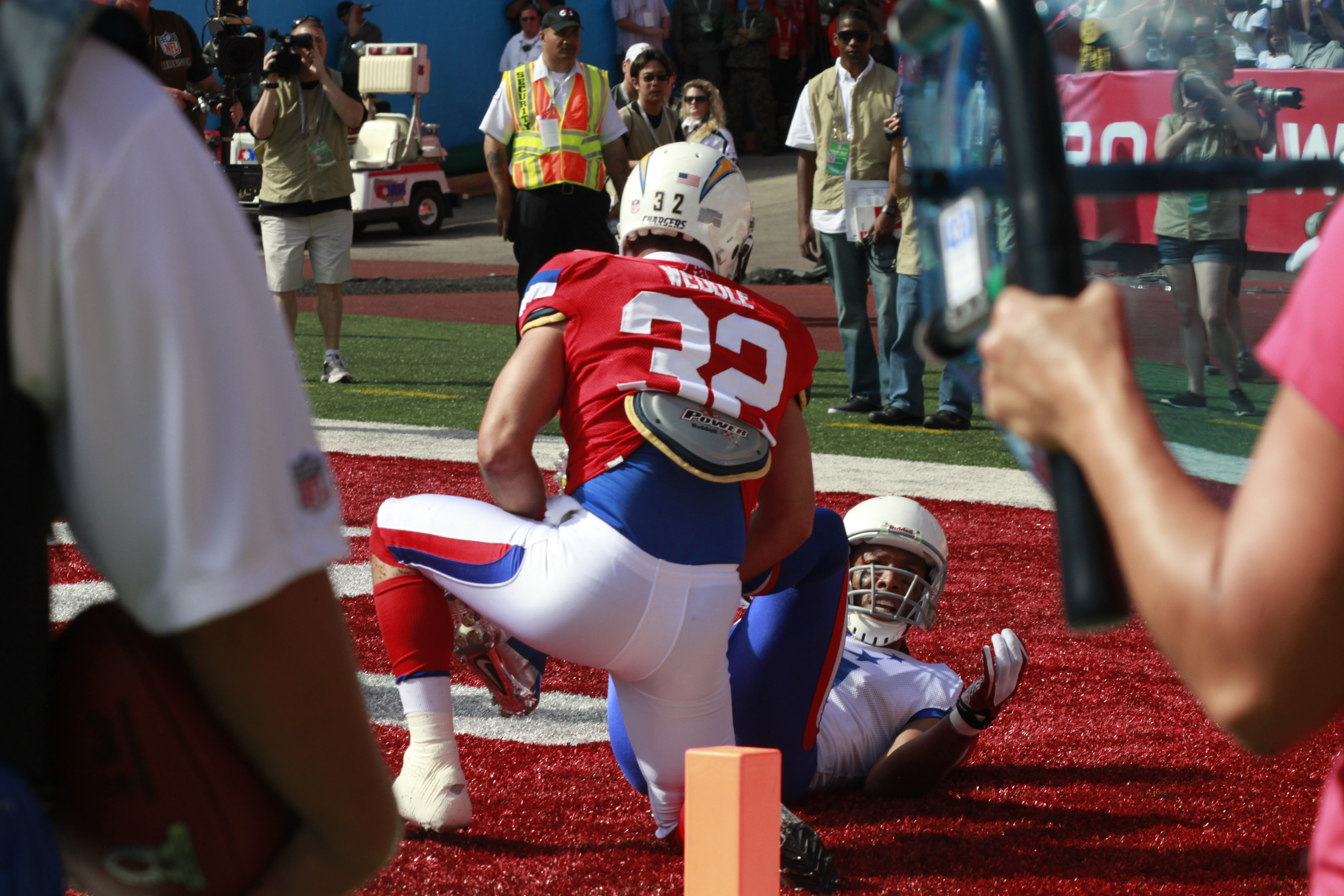
Weddle at the 2012 Pro Bowl

On January 5, 2012, the Chargers fired defensive coordinator Greg Manusky after one season. He was replaced by linebackers coach John Pagano and it was speculated by the media that he was released due to the defense's lack of aggression.

Head coach Norv Turner retained Weddle as the starting free safety in 2012. He started alongside strong safety Atari Bigby. On November 18, 2012, Weddle recorded six combined tackles, deflected a pass, and returned an interception for a touchdown in a 30–23 loss at the Denver Broncos in Week 11. He intercepted a pass by quarterback Peyton Manning, that was thrown to wide receiver Matt Willis, and returned it 23-yards for a touchdown in the first quarter. The touchdown marked his third career pick six. In Week 15, he collected a season-high ten combined tackles (seven solo) during a 31–7 loss to the Carolina Panthers. On December 31, 2012, the San Diego Chargers fired general manager A. J. Smith and head coach Norv Turner after finishing the season with a disappointing 9–7 record. He finished the 2012 season with 97 combined tackles (83 solo), nine passes defensed, three interceptions, and a touchdown in 16 games and 16 starts. His teammates voted him as the Chargers' MVP in 2012 and he also was named to the Associated Press All-Pro Team. Pro Football Focus gave Weddle an overall grade of +27.7, which ranked as the top grade among qualifying safeties in 2012.

==== 2013 season ====
John Pagano remained the San Diego Chargers' defensive coordinator and retained Weddle as the starter at free safety. Head coach Mike McCoy officially named him the starting free safety to start 2013, opposite strong safety Marcus Gilchrist. On November 3, 2013, he collected a season-high 15 combined tackles (nine solo) in a 30–24 loss at the Washington Redskins in Week 9. On December 27, 2013, it was announced that Weddle was selected to play in the 2014 Pro Bowl.

Weddle finished the season with 115 combined tackles (88 solo), nine pass deflections, two interceptions, two fumble recoveries, a forced fumble, and a sack in 16 games and 16 starts. He received an overall grade of +11.3 from Pro Football Focus in 2013.

The Chargers finished third in the AFC West with a 9–7 record and earned a wildcard berth. On January 5, 2014, Weddle recorded six combined tackles and deflected a pass in their 27–10 win at the Cincinnati Bengals in the AFC Wildcard Game. They were eliminated the following week after losing 24–17 at the Denver Broncos in the AFC Divisional.

==== 2014 season ====
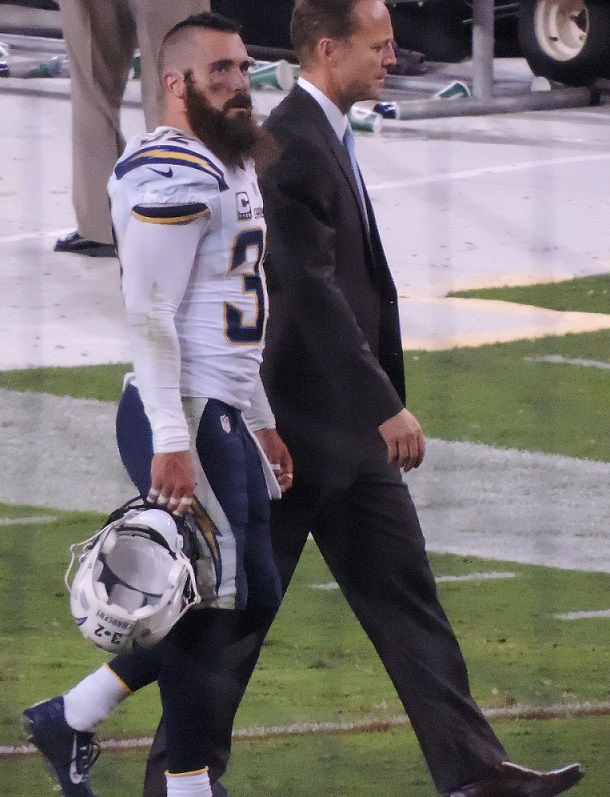
Weddle in 2014

Weddle and Marcus Gilchrist returned as the starting safeties for the Chargers in 2014. In Week 4, he recorded four combined tackles, deflected a pass, and made his only interception of the season off a pass by quarterback Blake Bortles in a 33–14 win against the Jacksonville Jaguars. On October 19, 2014, Weddle made a season-high 13 combined tackles (ten solo) during a 23–20 loss to the Kansas City Chiefs in Week 7. On December 23, 2014, Weddle was voted to play in the 2015 Pro Bowl, making it his third consecutive Pro Bowl selection.

Weddle finished the season with 114 combined tackles (91 solo), eight pass deflections, two forced fumbles, and an interception in 16 games and 16 starts. He also ranked as the 86th best player in the league on the NFL Top 100 Players of 2014.

==== 2015 season ====
On May 25, 2015, it was reported that Weddle was expected to holdout and skip organized team activities after he did not receive a contract extension from the Chargers. Weddle was on the last year of his five-year contract and was due $7.5 million in 2015. On June 15, 2015, Weddle officially ended his holdout and was required to attend minicamp. He read a prepared statement and said,

Contrary to what has recently been said by upper management, there has never been any financial numbers discussed and the Chargers have never put an offer on the table for us to consider. It is obvious to me I am not part of this organization's long-term plans. The NFL is a business, and I can accept that. I just wish the organization had been upfront with me from day one. That said, I have been working my tail off to prepare for the upcoming season, and I feel amazing. I am extremely excited about re-joining my teammates today and getting back to the practice field and working to bring a Super Bowl trophy to San Diego. From a contract standpoint, if we do not agree to a multi-year extension before training camp, I have instructed my agent to not speak to the Chargers again. I will give this team everything I have this year and head to free agency in 2016. This will be the one and only time I will discuss my contract, and I look forward to discussing football.”

Head coach Mike McCoy named Weddle the starting free safety to begin the regular season, along with strong safety Jahleel Addae. He was inactive for two games (Weeks 7–8) after sustaining a groin injury. His injury ended his 86-game streak of consecutive starts that began in 2010. On November 8, 2015, Weddle recorded a season-high 13 combined tackles (nine solo) during a 22–19 loss to the Chicago Bears in Week 9. On December 20, 2015, he made two combined tackles and a pass deflection during a 30–14 victory against the Miami Dolphins in Week 15. After the game, Weddle and several other Chargers players returned to the field to sign autographs for the fans, as they were unsure if it would be the team's final time playing in San Diego. Once security asked the remaining fans to leave, Weddle laid down on the Chargers logo in the middle of the field. However, the team would stay in the city the following season.

The following Thursday, Weddle received a $10,000 fine from the San Diego Chargers for behavior that was detrimental to the team after he did not report to the team locker room during halftime. Weddle opted to watch his daughter perform as part of the halftime show along with her cheerleading group and did not receive permission from management. Weddle's agent, David Canter, said he planned to file a grievance with the NFL Players Association and said that he felt disrespected by the way things were handled. Weddle played his last game with the Chargers the following week and recorded three combined tackles in a 23–20 loss at the Oakland Raiders in Week 16. On December 28, 2015, the San Diego Chargers placed Weddle on injured reserve for their Week 17 matchup at the Denver Broncos. Weddle later stated he was able to play and he was told he was unable to travel with the team due to the limited size of the plane. He finished the 2015 season with a half-sack, 78 tackles, six passes defended, and one fumble recovery.

=== Baltimore Ravens ===
==== 2016 season ====
On March 16, 2016, Weddle signed a four-year, $29 million contract with the Baltimore Ravens, with $13 million guaranteed. Head coach John Harbaugh officially named Weddle the starting strong safety to begin the regular season, alongside free safety Lardarius Webb.

On September 18, 2016, Weddle recorded six combined tackles, a pass deflection, and intercepted a pass by Josh McCown in a 25–20 victory at the Cleveland Browns. The interception marked his first pick as a member of the Ravens and became his 20th interception of his career. On December 12, 2016, Weddle collected a season-high 11 combined tackles (six solo), deflected a pass, a sack, and intercepted a pass attempt by quarterback Tom Brady during a 23–30 loss at the New England Patriots in Week 14. On December 21, 2016, it was announced that Weddle was selected to be a second-team alternate for the 2017 Pro Bowl. He finished the 2016 season with 89 combined tackles (48 solo), a career-high 13 pass deflections, four interceptions, a sack, and a forced fumble in 16 games and 16 starts.

On January 23, 2017, it was announced that Weddle was selected to play in the 2017 Pro Bowl to replace safety Devin McCourty who reached Super Bowl LI as a member of the New England Patriots. Weddle was voted by teammates to be a captain for the AFC.

==== 2017 season ====
Weddle moved back to free safety after the Baltimore Ravens signed free agent strong safety Tony Jefferson. Weddle and Jefferson were officially named the starters to begin the season. In Week 4, Weddle recorded a season-high eight combined tackles, two pass deflections, and an interception in the Ravens' 26–9 loss to the Pittsburgh Steelers. On December 3, 2017, Weddle made three combined tackles, a pass deflection, recorded a strip/sack, and returned an interception for a touchdown during a 44–20 victory against the Detroit Lions in Week 13. He returned an interception by quarterback Jake Rudock for a 45-yard touchdown in the fourth quarter and recorded a strip/sack on Matthew Stafford that was recovered by teammate Willie Henry in the second quarter. His pick six became the fourth of his career and his performance earned him AFC Defensive Player of the Week. On December 19, 2017, it was announced that Weddle was voted to the 2018 Pro Bowl. He completed the season with 63 combined tackles (49 solo), eight passes defensed, six interceptions, a sack, forced fumble, and touchdown in 16 games and 16 starts.

==== 2018 season ====
Weddle returned in 2018 as the Ravens starting free safety. He finished the season with 68 combined tackles, one sack, and three pass deflections in 16 games and 16 starts. He was named to his sixth Pro Bowl, and third straight. He was ranked 100th by his fellow players on the NFL Top 100 Players of 2019.

At the beginning of the offseason, Weddle indicated his desire to see out his contract with Baltimore, stating he would retire if he was not kept by the team. However, on March 5, 2019, Weddle was released by the Ravens. Weddle stated that he understood the team's decision and said he had no hard feelings towards the organization.

=== Los Angeles Rams ===
==== 2019 season and initial retirement ====
Despite his earlier statement that he would retire if not kept by the Ravens, Weddle signed a two-year contract worth $10,502,050 with the Los Angeles Rams on March 8, 2019. During Week 4 against the Tampa Bay Buccaneers, Weddle recorded a team-high 15 tackles and 2 passes defended in the 55–40 loss. He finished the season second on the team with 108 tackles, along with four passes defended.

On February 6, 2020, Weddle announced his retirement from the NFL after 13 seasons.

==== 2021 postseason, Super Bowl LVI and second retirement ====
On January 12, 2022, it was announced that Weddle would come out of retirement to sign with the Rams' practice squad. This was after the team lost safeties Jordan Fuller, who had suffered an ankle injury, and Taylor Rapp, who had entered the concussion protocol. The Rams could only offer Weddle a contract that was prorated by each playoff game played and worth up to a total of $225,000 if the team won the Super Bowl. This was due to an NFL collective bargaining agreement rule that limited the earnings of a player who joined a team after the regular season, as was Weddle's case. Going against his agent's suggestion, Weddle chose to accept this reduced contract out of his love for the game.

Weddle had to quickly learn the new defense, which the team changed since he last played with them in 2019. On his first day back, he met with secondary coach Ejiro Evero, who originally had the idea of reaching out to Weddle after the team lost its starting safeties. By the next day, Weddle knew the defense as well as Evero. Weddle was promoted to the active roster during the playoffs. With his old number 32 taken by Rams linebacker Travin Howard, Weddle elected to wear number 20 to indicate that he was now "Weddle Version 2.0". Rams cornerback Jalen Ramsey previously wore 20 but switched to the number 5 that season, and prohibited anyone else from wearing his old number. However, Ramsey gave his blessing to Weddle due to their close relationship.

During the Wild Card Round against the Arizona Cardinals, Weddle came off the bench and played nine defensive snaps before suffering a minor hamstring injury, but remained in the game. The Rams had an easy 34–11 victory, so he eventually returned to the bench early to nurse his injuries. In the Divisional Round against the defending Super Bowl champions Tampa Bay Buccaneers, Weddle again came off the bench, but would have an increased load, playing 61 defensive snaps in a 30–27 victory. The next week, in the NFC Championship against the San Francisco 49ers, Weddle would start, play in every defensive snap and lead the team with nine tackles in a 20–17 win. The latter victory meant the Rams would advance to the Super Bowl, Weddle's first appearance in the game. Rapp was expected to be available, but only as a backup to Weddle.

Weddle would start again in Super Bowl LVI against the Cincinnati Bengals, and would wear the communication device that designated him as the play caller on defense. In the first quarter, he suffered a pectoral muscle tear that would require surgery, but he refused to leave the game. Weddle ended up playing all 61 defensive snaps in the game and recorded five tackles, helping lead the Rams to a 23–20 victory and finally earning him a Super Bowl championship.

After the Super Bowl, Weddle announced he was retiring again, with his goal of a championship ring achieved after a 14-year career. He sarcastically thanked Chargers general manager Tom Telesco for his acrimonious end with the franchise, saying that their failure to re-sign him was key to "showing me the light, and giving me that motivation and that fire". He also said that he now had "the last laugh" on the Chargers because he was a champion. When reflecting on his decision to come out of retirement and ending his career after winning the Super Bowl, Weddle said "certain things had to happen for me to be in this moment, and to finish it off the way we did is just something you hear out of a book, or a story — a fiction fairy tale you only wish that your name would be a part of it. Lucky me, it's about me, and I'm a world champ now".

== Post-playing career ==
On February 19, 2022, it was announced that Weddle would be taking over the head coach job at Rancho Bernardo High School. After assisting incumbent head coach Tristan McCoy for one season, Weddle assumed the complete title of head coach.

== NFL career statistics ==
Legend
	Won the Super Bowl
	Led the league
**Bold**	Career high

=== Regular season ===
Year	Team	Games		Tackles				Fumbles			Interceptions					
Year	Team	GP	GS	Cmb	Solo	Ast	Sck	FF	FR	Yds	Int	Yds	Avg	Lng	TD	PD
2007	SD	15	0	54	43	11	1.0	0	0	0	1	0	0.0	0	0	6
2008	SD	16	16	**127**	**105**	22	1.0	0	1	**86**	1	3	3.0	3	0	5
2009	SD	13	13	82	68	14	**1.5**	0	0	0	2	44	22.0	31	**1**	7
2010	SD	16	16	96	80	16	0.5	0	0	0	2	64	**32.0**	41	**1**	10
2011	SD	16	16	88	70	18	0.0	0	0	0	**7**	89	12.7	26	0	11
2012	SD	16	16	97	83	14	1.0	**2**	**2**	0	3	52	17.3	23	**1**	8
2013	SD	16	16	115	88	27	1.0	1	**2**	27	2	21	10.5	21	0	9
2014	SD	16	16	114	91	23	0.0	**2**	0	0	1	17	17.0	17	0	8
2015	SD	13	13	78	55	23	0.5	0	1	0	0	0	0.0	0	0	6
2016	BAL	16	16	89	48	**41**	1.0	1	0	0	4	**92**	23.0	**53**	0	**13**
2017	BAL	16	16	63	49	14	1.0	**2**	1	0	6	85	14.2	45	**1**	8
2018	BAL	16	16	68	54	14	1.0	0	0	0	0	0	0.0	0	0	3
2019	LAR	16	16	108	69	39	0.0	0	0	0	0	0	0.0	0	0	4
Career		201	186	1,179	903	276	9.5	8	7	113	29	467	16.1	53	4	98

=== Postseason ===
Year	Team	Games		Tackles				Fumbles			Interceptions					
Year	Team	GP	GS	Cmb	Solo	Ast	Sck	FF	FR	Yds	Int	Yds	Avg	Lng	TD	PD
2007	SD	3	0	12	7	5	0.0	0	0	0	**1**	0	0.0	0	0	1
2008	SD	2	2	**18**	**15**	3	**1.0**	0	0	0	0	0	0.0	0	0	**3**
2009	SD	1	1	8	8	0	**1.0**	0	0	0	0	0	0.0	0	0	0
2013	SD	2	2	11	6	5	0.0	0	0	0	0	0	0.0	0	0	1
2018	BAL	1	1	7	7	0	0.0	0	0	0	0	0	0.0	0	0	0
2021	LAR	4	2	**18**	10	**8**	0.0	0	0	0	0	0	0.0	0	0	0
Career		13	8	74	53	21	2.0	0	0	0	1	0	0.0	0	0	5

== Personal life ==
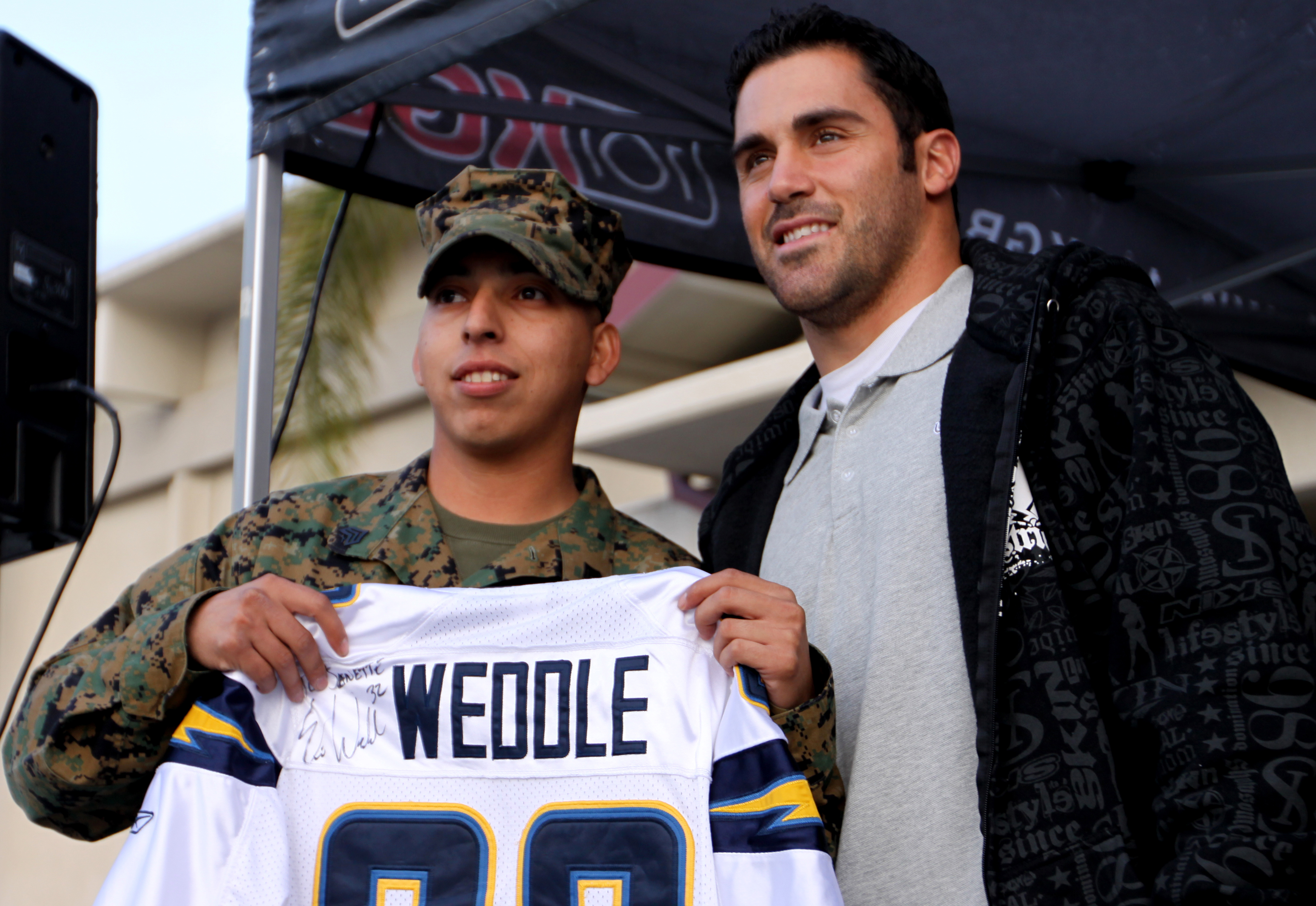
Weddle (right) in 2009

Weddle married his former high school sweetheart, Chanel, in La Jolla in 2005, before his junior year at Utah. They have four children.

While in college at the University of Utah, Weddle converted to the Church of Jesus Christ of Latter-day Saints.

Weddle's rise through the NFL was chronicled in the book No Excuses, No Regrets: The Eric Weddle Story, which was written by Trent Toone and published by Shadow Mountain. The book, which tells his story of overcoming adversity and accomplishing impossible dreams, became available to readers in May 2014. Weddle's former coach from his college years, Kyle Whittingham, wrote the foreword.
