= David Castain =

- Born: August 5, 1988 (age 38); US
- Education: PhD
- Occupations: Businessman, life coach, adjunct professor, and traveller

David Michael Castain II (born August 5, 1988), is an American businessman and academic. He is perhaps best known for leaving a life of crime to later found a marketing firm worth over $5 million by November 2016 and $8.5 million by 2020.

== Early life ==
David was born in Pomona Valley Hospital in Pomona, California to Debra Ross and David Castain Sr.. He joined a gang when he was in the 8th grade for protection within his community. David was kicked out of multiple high schools before attending Valley View High School, a secondary school for students who have behavioral issues or are at risk of not graduating. He ultimately graduated from Alta Loma High School. In 2006 Castain was charged with armed robbery. He decided to attend Howard University when he was serving an 8-month house arrest term following the two years he had already served behind bars.

== Career ==
Castain began promoting parties while attending Howard University in Washington, DC. He gained national attention after he organized events with Sean Combs, Drake, LeBron James and other celebrities. In 2012 David was hired by Grey Goose where he served as their Director of Social Marketing. Following his seventh year of leaving a life of crime, he founded a nonprofit organization, the David Castain Foundation. In May 2013 David graduated from Howard University with a Bachelors in Speech and Applied Communication and a minor in sociology. He was the commencement speaker at his graduation ceremony. Upon graduating, he founded a marketing firm dubbed David Castain & Associates. The company obtained clients in various disciplines from Chipotle and Uber to a Berkshire Hathaway subsidiary, Cort Furniture. In 2014 he graduated from Georgetown University, where he was the recipient of the Golden Bulldog Award for being the 'Most Creative' student in the program, with a Master's in public relations and corporate communications. Castain returned to his alma mater, Howard University in August of that same year to pursue his Ph.D. in sociology, with a concentration in medical sociology and social inequality. Castain is a member of the Kappa Alpha Psi Greek fraternal organization. In 2021, Forbes named him to their Next 1000 list. Castain's doctoral thesis studied "Instagram Branding Strategies, Leadership, and Decision-Making Competency in Business Practices Between Millenial and Generation Z Entrepreneurs in the Western United States."

He is an adjunct professor at Delaware County Community College teaching public speaking. Castain was named to the Global Top 100 Under 40 Most Influential People of African Descent by the civil society Most Influential People of African Descent.

=== Public speaking ===
Castain has hosted two TEDx talks. In 2021 he hosted a TEDxBuckhead discussing the currency of reputation and clout and their relevancy to marketing, self-image, and career opportunities. He hosted a talk at TEDxMorgan State University in 2026 discussing his past and how the internet and artificial intelligence can reduce societal barriers to opportunities for a meaningful life.

== Filmography ==
Year	Film	Role	Notes
2013	Fox 5 DC	Himself	Episode: "Most Successful Black Entrepreneurs in Washington, DC"
2016	Ink, Paper, Scissors	Himself	BET original series. Episode: "BET Awards Red Carpet 2016"
