= Taylor Rapp =

American football player (born 1997)

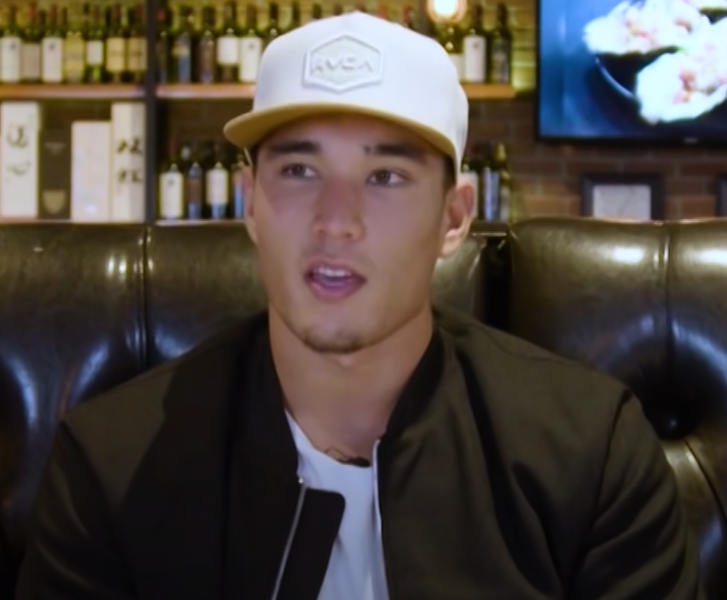
- Rapp in 2020

No. 30 – Denver Broncos
- Position: Safety
- Roster status: Active

Personal information
- Born: December 22, 1997 (age 28); Atlanta, Georgia, U.S.
- Listed height: 6 ft 0 in (1.83 m)
- Listed weight: 208 lb (94 kg)

Career information
- High school: Sehome (Bellingham, Washington)
- College: Washington (2016–2018)
- NFL draft: 2019: 2nd round, 61st overall pick

Career history
- Los Angeles Rams (2019–2022); Buffalo Bills (2023–2025); Denver Broncos (2026–present)

Awards and highlights
- Super Bowl champion (LVI); Pac-12 Defensive Freshman of the Year (2016); Second-team All-American (2018); 2× First-team All-Pac-12 (2017, 2018); Freshman All-American (2016)

Career NFL statistics as of Week 8, 2026
- Total tackles: 502
- Sacks: 2
- Pass deflections: 31
- Interceptions: 12
- Forced fumbles: 2
- Fumble recoveries: 4
- Defensive touchdowns: 1
- Stats at Pro Football Reference

Taylor Michael Rapp (born December 22, 1997) is an American professional football safety for the Denver Broncos of the National Football League (NFL). He played college football for the Washington Huskies, and was selected by the Los Angeles Rams in the second round of the 2019 NFL draft. He has also played for the Buffalo Bills.

== Early life ==
Rapp was born in Atlanta, Georgia, to a Chinese mother from Shanghai and a White father from Canada. After his birth, his parents decided to move to the West Coast. He was raised in Bellingham, Washington, with his older brother of three years, Austin. NFL.com described Rapp as a player who has "beaten long odds, undeterred by a city that failed to support prep football, a high school community that openly mocked him, coaches who were unprepared to develop his talents, college recruiters who blatantly overlooked him and kids who racially taunted him for his Chinese ethnicity."

Rapp attended Sehome High School in Bellingham, Washington. He played safety and running back and also ran track. Due to his success, he played football for the U-16 and U-17 USA national teams. He committed to Washington in the spring of his junior year, choosing the Huskies over several Football Bowl Subdivision programs, including Oregon, Stanford, Nebraska, and Notre Dame. Rapp was ranked as the #1 safety prospect in the state of Washington and the 9th best safety on the West Coast by Scout.com. He received an invitation to play in the prestigious U.S. Army All-American Bowl game, but elected not to attend as it interfered with his schedule following his early enrollment at the University of Washington.

== College career ==
=== Freshman ===
Rapp enrolled early at UW in January 2016 and participated in winter workouts and spring practices. He saw playing time in all 14 games of his freshman season, starting 10 of them. He started to emerge as a play maker in the secondary late in the season after nabbing a pair of interceptions against USC. In the 2016 Pac-12 Football Championship Game, Rapp intercepted back-to-back passes from Colorado quarterback Sefo Liufau, returning one of them for a touchdown. For his outstanding performance, he was named the Pac-12 Championship Game MVP. Following the regular season, Rapp was named to the USA Today Freshman All-American team. Rapp was recognized by the Pac-12 as the conference's Freshman Defensive Player of the Year. On December 12, Rapp was named to the ESPN True Freshman All-America team. On December 19, he was named to the Pro Football Focus Freshman All-American team. On January 9, Rapp was named to the Football Writers Association of America Freshman All-America team.

=== Sophomore ===
Prior to the 2017 season, Rapp was named one of the 100 best players in college football by Sports Illustrated, coming in at number 39 on the list. Earning first-team All-Pac-12 honors for the 2017 season, he was also named to the Academic All-Pac-12 first team. He was also named a CoSIDA Academic All-District 8 player. Rapp gained acceptance into the University of Washington's prestigious Foster School of Business late in 2017.

=== Junior ===
Prior to his junior season, Rapp was named a first-team All-American by the Associated Press and Sports Illustrated. On January 2, 2019, Rapp announced that he would forgo his final year of eligibility and declare for the 2019 NFL draft.

== Professional career ==
=== Pre-draft ===
"Versatile three-year starter who combines tenacity with football intelligence to play at a consistently high level. Rapp isn’t big, but he’s well-built and durability hasn’t been a concern despite his physical nature as a striker. He played all over the field this year and might be best-suited in a mix between down safety and two-high looks with the ability to cover tight ends. His coverage talent is average, but his run support effort and open-field tackling are clearly defined strengths that make him a relatively safe selection."

— Lance Zierlein (NFL Network Analyst)

External videos
- ESPN NFL Draft Profile: Taylor Rapp
- 2019 NFL Combine: Taylor Rapp

Prior to the NFL Scouting Combine and Ohio State's Pro Day, the majority of NFL draft analysts had Rapp ranked as the top safety in the 2019 NFL Draft. Rapp chose to forgo running the 40–yard dash at the NFL combine. On April 1, 2019, he performed at Ohio State's Pro Day and severely hampered his draft stock after posting a unimpressive time in the – dash. NFL draft analysts projected Rapp to be selected in the second round following the NFL Combine and Ohio State's Pro Day. Dane Brugler of The Athletic reported many NFL teams flagged Rapp for a hip flexor issue and stated his injury probably contributed to his slow time in the 40. His Defensive coordinator at Washington, Jimmy Lake stated Rapp was the smartest football player he's ever coached. Pro Football Focus and NFL analyst Rob Rang ranked Rapp as the third best safety in the draft. ESPN's Jeff Legwold ranked him as the second best safety prospect (28th overall) available in the 2019 NFL Draft. Former NFL Executive Gil Brandt ranked Rapp as the fourth best safety prospect (54th overall) in the 2019 NFL Draft. Scouts Inc. ranked him as the fourth best safety prospect (43rd overall) on their big board.

Pre-draft measurables
Height	Weight	Arm length	Hand span	Wingspan	40-yard dash	10-yard split	20-yard split	20-yard shuttle	Three-cone drill	Vertical jump	Broad jump	Bench press
5 ft 11 3/4 in (1.82 m)	208 lb (94 kg)	30 3/4 in (0.78 m)	9 in (0.23 m)	6 ft 0 7/8 in (1.85 m)	4.78 s	1.61 s	2.75 s	3.99 s	6.82 s	35.0 in (0.89 m)	9 ft 7 in (2.92 m)	17 reps
All values from NFL Combine/Pro Day

=== Los Angeles Rams ===
The Los Angeles Rams selected Rapp in the second round (61st overall) of the 2019 NFL draft. He was the fifth safety drafted in 2019. The Rams acquired the 61st overall pick they used to draft Rapp from the Kansas City Chiefs in exchange for their third (56th overall) and fifth round picks (167th overall) in the 2019 NFL Draft. He became the highest drafted player of Asian descent in the history of the NFL draft, surpassing former Virginia Tech Offensive Tackle Ed Wang who was selected in the fifth round (140th overall) of the 2010 NFL draft by the Buffalo Bills.

"To get a player like Taylor Rapp who we would’ve felt comfortable with potentially taking at 31. A versatile playmaker, very similar in the mold of what you love about Eric Weddle and John Johnson. He was one of the best football players that we felt like was in this draft.”

— Sean McVay (LA Rams' Head coach)

"So Rapp isn’t a workout warrior. It is still undeniable that he is one of the best football players in the 2019 NFL Draft, based on his performance and production between the lines. As a versatile defender with outstanding instincts, awareness and ball skills, Rapp is an impact player with the capacity to create turnovers between the hashes or near the line of scrimmage as a box-area defender with explosive blitzing skills. If he can pick up a few tips from new Rams' teammate (and two-time All-Pro safety) Eric Weddle, he could quickly become an all-star performer."

— Bucky Brooks (NFL.com)

==== 2019 ====
On June 7, 2019, the Los Angeles Rams signed Rapp to a four–year, $4.67 million contract that includes $2.12 million guaranteed and a signing bonus of $1.41 million.

He entered training camp slated as a backup safety behind solidified veterans Eric Weddle and John Johnson. Head coach Sean McVay named Rapp the backup strong safety to start the season, behind starting strong safety John Johnson and starting free safety Eric Weddle.

On September 8, 2019, Rapp made his professional regular season debut in the Los Angeles Rams' season-opener at the Carolina Panthers and recorded eight combined tackles (four solo) during a 30–27 victory. He was inactive during a Week 5 loss at the Seattle Seahawks after injuring his ankle. On October 16, 2019, starting strong safety John Johnson was placed on injured reserve for the rest of the season with Rapp subsequently being promoted to his position in his absence. On October 20, 2019, Rapp earned his first career start and made six combined tackles (five solo) as the Rams won 37–10 at the Atlanta Falcons. The following week, he collected a season-high 12 combined tackles (nine solo) and broke up a pass during a 24–10 win against the Cincinnati Bengals. On December 1, 2019, Rapp recorded two solo tackles and made his first career interception off a pass by fellow rookie Kyler Murray intended for wide receiver Larry Fitzgerald and returned it 31-yards for his first career touchdown in the Rams' 34–7 win at the Arizona Cardinals. In Week 16 at the San Francisco 49ers, Rapp recorded five combined tackles (four solo) in the 34–31 loss. With 58 seconds left in the game on third and 16, Rapp and Jalen Ramsey made an error in coverage resulting in a 46-yard completion to wide receiver Emmanuel Sanders, leading to a game-winning field goal that knocked the Rams out of playoff contention. The following week, Rapp made six combined tackles (five solo), an interception, and had his first career fumble recovery on a mishandled snap by Kyler Murray during a 31–24 win against the Arizona Cardinals. He finished his rookie season with 100 combined tackles (62 solo), eight pass deflections, three interceptions, one fumble recovery, and a touchdown in 15 games and ten starts.

The Los Angeles Rams finished the 2019 NFL season third in the NFC West with a 9–7 record, subsequently missing the playoffs. Head coach Sean McVay decided not to renew the contract of defensive coordinator Wade Phillips.

==== 2020 ====
On January 16, 2020, the Los Angeles Rams announced their hiring of Denver Broncos' linebackers coach Brandon Staley as their defensive coordinator. He entered training camp as a possible candidate to become the starting free safety after Eric Weddle retired ahead of the 2020 NFL season. He competed against Nick Scott, Jordan Fuller, and Terrell Burgess. Head coach Sean McVay named John Johnson III and Jordan Fuller the starting safeties to start the season, relegating Rapp to backup strong safety.

External videos
- Taylor Rapp INTs Bears QB Nick Foles

In Week 4, Rapp racked up a season-high eight combined tackles (seven solo) during a 17–9 victory against the New York Giants. On October 26, 2020, Rapp recorded seven combined tackles (three solo) and had his lone interception of the season on a pass thrown by Nick Foles to wide receiver Darnell Mooney as the Rams defeated the Chicago Bears 24–10 on Monday Night Football. On November 15, 2020, Rapp made one solo tackle before exiting in the third quarter of a 23–16 winn against the Seattle Seahawks after injuring his knee. On November 17, 2020, the Los Angeles Rams placed Rapp on injured reserve due to his knee injury and missed the last seven games of the season (Weeks 11–17). He finished with 44 combined tackles (32 solo), three pass deflections, and one interception in nine games and five starts.

==== 2021 ====
Former Atlanta Falcons' defensive coordinator Raheem Morris accepted the same role with the Los Angeles Rams after Brandon Staley became the head coach of the Los Angeles Chargers. Morris held an open competition for the roles as starting safeties between Rapp, John Johnson III, Jordan Fuller, Nick Scott, Terrell Burgess, Jovan Grant, Troy Warner, and Paris Ford. Head coach Sean McVay named Rapp the starting free safety to start the regular season, alongside starting strong safety Jordan Fuller.

On September 12, 2021, Rapp started in the Los Angeles Rams' season-opener for the first time in his career and made ten combined tackles (six solo) during a 34–14 win against the Chicago Bears. The following week, Rapp recorded eight combined tackles (three solo), one pass deflection, and was credited with half a sack after tackling Carson Wentz with teammate Greg Gaines, marking the first of his career in the Rams 27–24 victory at the Indianapolis Colts. On October 17, 2021, Rapp had five combined tackles (one solo), a season-high two pass deflections, and a career-high two interceptions off passes thrown by Daniel Jones in a 38–11 win over the New York Giants, earning National Football Conference Defensive Player of the Week. In Week 4, he collected a season-high 12 combined tackles (six solo) during a 27–20 win against the Arizona Cardinals. In Week 10 against the 49ers on Monday Night Football, Rapp recorded 10 tackles and got his first full career sack on Jimmy Garoppolo during the 31–10 loss. On January 9, 2022, Rapp recorded eight combined tackles (six solo) before exiting in the third quarter of a 24–37 win against the San Francisco 49ers due to a concussion. He finished the season with a total of 94 combined tackles (64 solo), six pass deflections, 1.5 sacks, and a career-high four interceptions while starting all 17 games. He finished his first full season as a starter with an overall grade of 65.5 from Pro Football Focus.

The Los Angeles Rams finished first in the NFC West with a 12–5 record, clinching a playoff berth. Rapp was sidelined for the first three playoffs games as he was still in concussion protocol. While inactive, the Rams defeated the Tampa Bay Buccaneers 30–27 in the Divisional Round and the San Francisco 49ers 20–17 in the NFC Championship Game. On February 13, 2022, Rapp started in Super Bowl LVI and recorded seven combined tackles (four solo) as the Los Angeles Rams defeated the Cincinnati Bengals 23–20, with Rapp earning his first Super Bowl ring.

==== 2022 ====
During training camp, Rapp competed for a role as a starting safety against Nick Scott and Jordan Fuller. In a surprise, head coach Sean McVay named Rapp the starting strong safety to start the season, alongside Nick Scott with Jordan Fuller unexpectedly listed as a backup.

In Week 12, Rapp collected a season-high 12 combined tackles (seven solo) during a 10–26 loss at the Kansas City Chiefs. On December 19, 2022, Rapp made three combined tackles (one solo), one pass deflection, and sealed the Rams' 17–16 victory over the Las Vegas Raiders after intercepting quarterback Derek Carr in final seconds of the game. The following week, he recorded seven combined tackles (six solo), one pass deflections, and had his second interception of the season against, Aaron Rodgers during a 12–24 loss at the Green Bay Packers. He finished the 2022 NFL season with a total of 92 combined tackles (58 solo), six pass deflections, and two interceptions in 16 games and 16 starts. He earned an overall grade of 76.2 from Pro Football Focus.

=== Buffalo Bills ===
On March 31, 2023, the Buffalo Bills signed Rapp to a one–year, $1.77 million contract that includes $1.65 million guaranteed upon signing and an initial signing bonus of $650,000. The signing of Rapp was unexpected after the Bills had already re-signed Jordan Poyer and Rapp had met with the New England Patriots.

==== 2023 ====
Rapp entered training camp as the clear cut third option at safety with Jordan Poyer and Micah Hyde cemented as the starters. Head coach Sean McDermott listed Rapp as the backup strong safety to begin the season, behind Poyer.

On September 23, 2023, the NFL fined Rapp for $9,611 for a helmet-to-helmet hit against wide receiver Davante Adams in the Week 2 win over the Raiders. In the second quarter of the Week 11 game against the New York Jets, he suffered a neck injury after colliding with running back Breece Hall with Rapp ultimately being carted off the field in an ambulance. He subsequently remained inactive for a Week 12 loss at the Philadelphia Eagles, but returned the following week. On December 23, 2023, Rapp started in place of Micah Hyde and collected a season-high nine combined tackles (seven solo) during a 24–22 victory at the Los Angeles Chargers. On January 7, 2024, Rapp had one solo tackle, a season-high two pass deflections, and made a crucial interception off a pass attempt thrown by Tua Tagovailoa to wide receiver Chase Claypool with 1:13 remaining in the fourth quarter to seal a 21–14 victory at the Miami Dolphins, clinching the AFC East for the Bills. He finished with 50 combined tackles (33 solo), two pass deflections, one interception, and was credited with half a sack in 16 games and four starts. He received an overall grade of 56.4 from Pro Football Focus, ranking 85th among all qualifying safeties in 2023.

The Buffalo Bills finished the 2023 NFL season first in the AFC East with an 11–6 record. They advanced to the Divisional round but were eliminated after a 24–27 loss at the Kansas City Chiefs. Rapp was inactive for both playoff games due to a calf injury.

==== 2024 ====
On March 8, 2024, the Buffalo Bills re-signed Rapp to a three–year, $10.62 million contract that includes $4.85 million guaranteed, $3.67 million guaranteed upon signing, and an initial signing bonus of $2 million. Rapp was re-signed following the departures of long-time safeties Micah Hyde and Jordan Poyer. Entering training camp, Rapp was projected to earn one of the starting safety positions, but received competition from Damar Hamlin, Mike Edwards, Cole Bishop, and Kareem Jackson. Defensive coordinator Bobby Babich named Rapp and Damar Hamlin the starting safeties to begin the season.

During the Bills' week 4 matchup against the Baltimore Ravens on NBC Sunday Night Football, Rapp suffered a concussion while tackling running back Derrick Henry, causing him to miss the next game. On October 14, 2024, he returned against the New York Jets, playing every snap while donning a guardian cap on top of his helmet and recorded eight combined tackles (five solo) and a season-high three pass deflections as the Bills won 23–20. On November 10, 2024, Rapp recorded seven combined tackles (five solo), one pass deflection, and intercepted a pass by Joe Flacco during a 30–20 victory at the Indianapolis Colts. The following week, he had six combined tackles (three solo), one pass deflection, and had his second consecutive game with an interception on a pass attempt by Patrick Mahomes in the Bills' 30–21 win against the Kansas City Chiefs in Week 11. On December 8, 2024, Rapp collected a season-high 13 combined tackles (eight solo) in a 42–44 loss at the Los Angeles Rams. He injured his neck and missed the next two games (Weeks 15–16). He finished the season with 82 combined tackles (48 solo), six pass deflections, two interceptions, and a forced fumble in 13 games and 13 starts. He received an overall grade of 59.0 from Pro Football Focus, which ranked 117th among 170 safeties in 2024.

The Buffalo Bills finished the 2024 NFL season first in the AFC East with a 13–4 record, clinching a playoff berth. On January 12, 2025, Rapp made one solo tackle during a 31–7 win against the Denver Broncos in the Wildcard Game. On January 19, 2025, Rapp started in the Divisional Round and recorded two combined tackles (one solo), made one pass deflection, and intercepted a pass thrown by Lamar Jackson to wide receiver Rashod Bateman before exiting in the third quarter of a 27–25 win against the Baltimore Ravens after injuring his hip. He was subsequently inactive due to his hip injury for the Buffalo Bills 29–32 loss at the Kansas City Chiefs in the AFC Championship Game.

==== 2025 ====
Rapp started all six of his appearances for Buffalo during the 2025 season, recording 26 combined tackles. On October 24, 2025, Rapp was placed on injured reserve due to a knee injury. On October 31, head coach Sean McDermott announced that Rapp would 'probably' miss the remainder of the season after undergoing surgery.

On March 6, 2026, Rapp was released by the Bills.

=== Denver Broncos ===
On August 20, 2026, Rapp signed with the Denver Broncos. On August 26, he was released by the Broncos. Later that day, head coach Sean Payton clarified that the move was due to a personal matter Rapp needed to address, and that it was likely he would re-join the team at a later time. On September 7, Rapp was re-signed to the Broncos' practice squad. For the Broncos' Week 6 game against the Seattle Seahawks, he was elevated to the active roster while Talanoa Hufanga was recovering from an ankle injury. With Hufanga still out in Week 7 against the Arizona Cardinals, Rapp was elevated again. On October 31, he was promoted to the active roster. On November 6, he was released again. The next day, he was re-signed to the practice squad and then elevated to the active roster for Week 9. On November 21, Rapp was signed to the active roster.

Legend
	Won the Super Bowl
**Bold**	Career high

=== Regular season ===
Year	Team	Games		Tackles				Interceptions						Fumbles	
Year	Team	GP	GS	Comb	Solo	Ast	Sack	PD	Int	Yds	Avg	Lng	TD	FF	FR
2019	LAR	15	10	**100**	62	**38**	0.0	**8**	2	**54**	**27.0**	**31**	**1**	0	**1**
2020	LAR	9	5	44	32	12	0.0	3	1	0	0.0	0	0	**1**	0
2021	LAR	**17**	**17**	94	**64**	30	**1.5**	6	**4**	31	7.8	18	0	0	**1**
2022	LAR	16	16	92	58	34	0.0	6	2	18	9.0	18	0	0	**1**
2023	BUF	16	4	50	33	17	0.5	2	1	0	0.0	0	0	0	**1**
2024	BUF	14	14	82	48	34	0.0	6	2	5	2.5	5	0	**1**	0
2025	BUF	6	6	26	17	9	0.0	0	0	0	0.0	0	0	0	0
2026	DEN	3	1	14	4	10	0.0	0	0	0	0.0	0	0	0	0
Career		96	73	502	318	184	2.0	31	12	108	9	31	1	2	4

=== Postseason ===
Year	Team	Games		Tackles				Interceptions						Fumbles	
Year	Team	GP	GS	Comb	Solo	Ast	Sack	PD	Int	Yds	Avg	Lng	TD	FF	FR
2021	LAR	1	0	7	4	3	0.0	0	0	0	0.0	0	0	0	0
2023	BUF	Did not play due to injury													
2024	BUF	2	2	3	1	2	0.0	1	1	0	0.0	0	0	0	0
2025	BUF	Did not play due to injury													
Career		3	2	10	5	5	0.0	1	1	0	0.0	0	0	0	0

== Personal life ==
In 2015, Rapp begun dating his high-school sweetheart Dani Johnson while attending Sehome High School. In 2022, Rapp proposed to Johnson following his Super Bowl LVI win with the Rams. They married in July that year.
