= Alta Loma High School =

Location
- 8880 Baseline Road; Rancho Cucamonga, California 91701; United States; 34°07′25″N 117°36′42″W

Information
- Type: Public
- Established: 1963
- School district: Chaffey Joint Union High School District
- Superintendent: Mathew Holton
- Principal: Jerome Rucker
- Teaching staff: 99.25 (FTE)
- Grades: 9–12
- Enrollment: 2,400 (2023–2024)
- Student to teacher ratio: 24.18
- Campus: Suburban
- Colors: Royal blue white silver
- Athletics conference: Palomares League
- Team name: Lions
- Newspaper: The Brave Times
- Yearbook: Sisunga
- Website: alhs.cjuhsd.net

Alta Loma High School is a public high school located in Rancho Cucamonga, California, United States, and is part of the Chaffey Joint Union High School District.

== History ==
Prior to 1955, all high school students in the Alta Loma, Cucamonga and Etiwanda Elementary School Districts received high school education at Chaffey High School in Ontario. With the opening of Upland High School in 1955, most of these students attended Upland High for high school studies. In the early 1960's rapid housing growth in the Alta Loma, Cucamonga, and Etiwanda areas created the need for a new high school. The Chaffey Union High School District issued bonds for construction of the new school located on farmland along the north side of Baseline Road just east of Carnelian Street in Alta Loma. A contract for construction was issued to Berry Construction of Ontario, with groundbreaking in March 1962. The primary construction was completed in July 1963 at a cost of $2.38 million. The freshman, sophomore, and junior classes of 1967, 1966, and 1965 respectively entered in the fall of 1963, with a formal dedication on November 19, 1963 (the senior class was allowed to finish at Upland High School with the class of 1964).,

With funding received from state bonds, expansion work was done between 1998 and 2001, adding on a new Math and Science building, a new dance studio, weight rooms, and a new library, along with renovation work on sites around the campus. On March 13, 2025, the mascot changed from the Braves to the Lions.

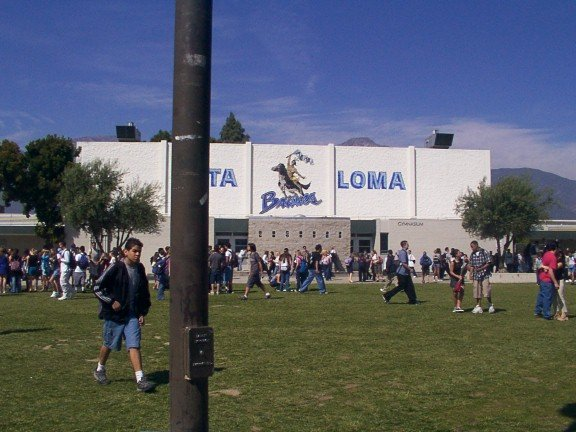
Alta Loma High School gym

== Academics ==
Alta Loma was a recipient of a Golden Ribbon Award from the California Department of Education in 2017 and a silver medalist for the U.S. News & World Report 2018 Best High Schools. Graduates from the Class of 2017 met the University of California A-G admission requirements at a rate of 66.2%.

== Athletics ==
Alta Loma is a member of the Palomares League of the CIF Southern Section. The school's football team plays its home games at Alta Loma's Uhalley Stadium.

== Notable alumni ==
- Carlos Bocanegra (graduated 1997), professional soccer player and former USMNT captain
- David Castain, American entrepreneur and philanthropist
- Charles Castronovo (graduated 1993), tenor and opera singer
- Kenyon Coleman (graduated 1997), NFL football player
- Travis Coons (graduated 2010), NFL football player
- Cameron Dunn (graduated 2001), professional soccer player who plays for Los Angeles Blues.
- Ejiro Evero, professional American football coach
- Rocky Long (graduated 1968), college football coach, head coach at San Diego State
- Sid Monge (graduated 1970), retired Major League Baseball relief pitcher
- Adam Parada (graduated 1999), professional basketball player
- Nancy Raabe (graduated 1972, née Miller), author, composer, clergy
- Eric Weddle (graduated 2003), former National Football League free safety
- Larri Merritt (graduated 2016), YouTuber and social media influencer
