= Ejiro Evero =

English gridiron football player and coach (born 1981)

Personal information
- Born: 6 January 1981 (age 45); Colchester, England
- Listed height: 5 ft 11 in (1.80 m)
- Listed weight: 199 lb (90 kg)

Career information
- Position: Safety
- High school: Alta Loma (Rancho Cucamonga, U.S.)
- College: UC Davis (1999–2003)
- NFL draft: 2004: undrafted

Career history

Playing
- Oakland Raiders (2004)*
- * Offseason or practice squad member only

Coaching
- UC Davis (2005–2006) Assistant coach; Tampa Bay Buccaneers (2007–2009) Defensive quality control coach; University of Redlands (2010) Special teams coordinator & safeties coach; San Francisco 49ers (2011–2015); Quality control coach (2011); Offensive assistant (2012–2013); Defensive assistant (2014–2015); Green Bay Packers (2016) Defensive quality control coach; Los Angeles Rams (2017–2021); Safeties coach (2017–2020); Secondary coach & passing game coordinator (2021); Denver Broncos (2022) Defensive coordinator; Carolina Panthers (2023–2026) Defensive coordinator

Awards and highlights
- As coach: Super Bowl champion (LVI)
- Coaching profile at Pro Football Reference

Ejiro Evero (born 6 January 1981) is an English American football coach. He most recently served as the Carolina Panthers defensive coordinator from 2023 to 2026. He previously served as an assistant coach for the Denver Broncos, Los Angeles Rams, Green Bay Packers, Tampa Bay Buccaneers, and San Francisco 49ers.

== Early life ==
Evero was born in Colchester, England, but grew up in Rancho Cucamonga, California, and attended Alta Loma High School.

== Playing career ==
Pre-draft measurables
| Height | Weight | 40-yard dash |
|---|---|---|
| 5 ft 11 3/8 in (1.81 m) | 199 lb (90 kg) | 4.43 s |
All values from Pro Day

Evero played college football at UC Davis as a safety and was signed by the Oakland Raiders as an undrafted free agent in 2004.

== Coaching career ==
=== Tampa Bay Buccaneers ===
Evero got his first NFL coaching opportunity with the Tampa Bay Buccaneers in 2007, where he worked as a defensive quality control coach until 2009.

=== San Francisco 49ers ===
After leaving the Tampa Bay Buccaneers in 2009 and spending the 2010 season with the University of Redlands, Evero got back into the NFL in 2011 with the San Francisco 49ers, where he worked as a quality control coach in 2011, an offensive assistant from 2012–2013 and a defensive assistant from 2014–2015.

=== Green Bay Packers ===
Evero served as a defensive quality control coach during the 2016 season with the Green Bay Packers.

=== Los Angeles Rams ===
Evero served as the safeties coach for the Los Angeles Rams from 2017–2020. For the 2021 season, Evero had his role changed to secondary coach and passing game coordinator. Evero helped the Rams win a Super Bowl during the 2021 season.

=== Denver Broncos ===
On 18 February 2022, Evero was hired by the Denver Broncos to serve as the team's defensive coordinator for the 2022 season. After Nathaniel Hackett was fired as the Broncos' head coach, Evero was offered the interim job. He decided to pass on the interim position and remain the defensive coordinator. On 4 February 2023, five days after the Denver Broncos traded for Sean Payton to be their head coach, Evero was released from his contract making him a free agent.

=== Carolina Panthers ===
On 5 February 2023, Evero was hired by the Carolina Panthers as their defensive coordinator under head coach Frank Reich. On February 8, 2024 it was announced Evero would be retained under new head coach Dave Canales. On January 11, 2026, Canales revealed that Evero had been signed to a contract extension.

On October 30, 2026, Evero was fired as the defensive coordinator of the Panthers.
