= Most Influential People of African Descent =

Global civil society

Most Influential People of African Descent, also known as MIPAD, is a global civil society founded in response to United Nations decrees that 2015-2024 and 2025-2035 are the first and second International Decades for People of African Descent, respectively. The organization compiles lists of the most influential people of African descent. According to the US National Institute on Minority Health and Health Disparities, honors from MIPAD recognize "high achievers of African descent in public and private sectors who have distinguished themselves in advancing people of African descent worldwide."

MIPAD has organized or sponsored events including the New York City African Heritage Reception in 2024 and a 2019 United Nations screening of the film "Bigger Than Africa" and subsequent panel discussion.
