= 2022 Dallas Cowboys season =

63rd season in franchise history

- Owner: Jerry Jones
- General manager: Jerry Jones
- Head coach: Mike McCarthy
- Offensive coordinator: Kellen Moore
- Defensive coordinator: Dan Quinn
- Home stadium: AT&T Stadium

Results
- Record: 12–5
- Division place: 2nd NFC East
- Playoffs: Won Wild Card Playoffs (at Buccaneers) 31–14; Lost Divisional Playoffs (at 49ers) 12–19
- All-Pros: 3: RG Zack Martin (1st team); LB Micah Parsons (1st team); WR CeeDee Lamb (2nd team)
- Pro Bowlers: 8: RB Tony Pollard; WR CeeDee Lamb; G Zack Martin; C Tyler Biadasz; DE DeMarcus Lawrence; OLB Micah Parsons; CB Trevon Diggs; RS KaVontae Turpin

Uniform
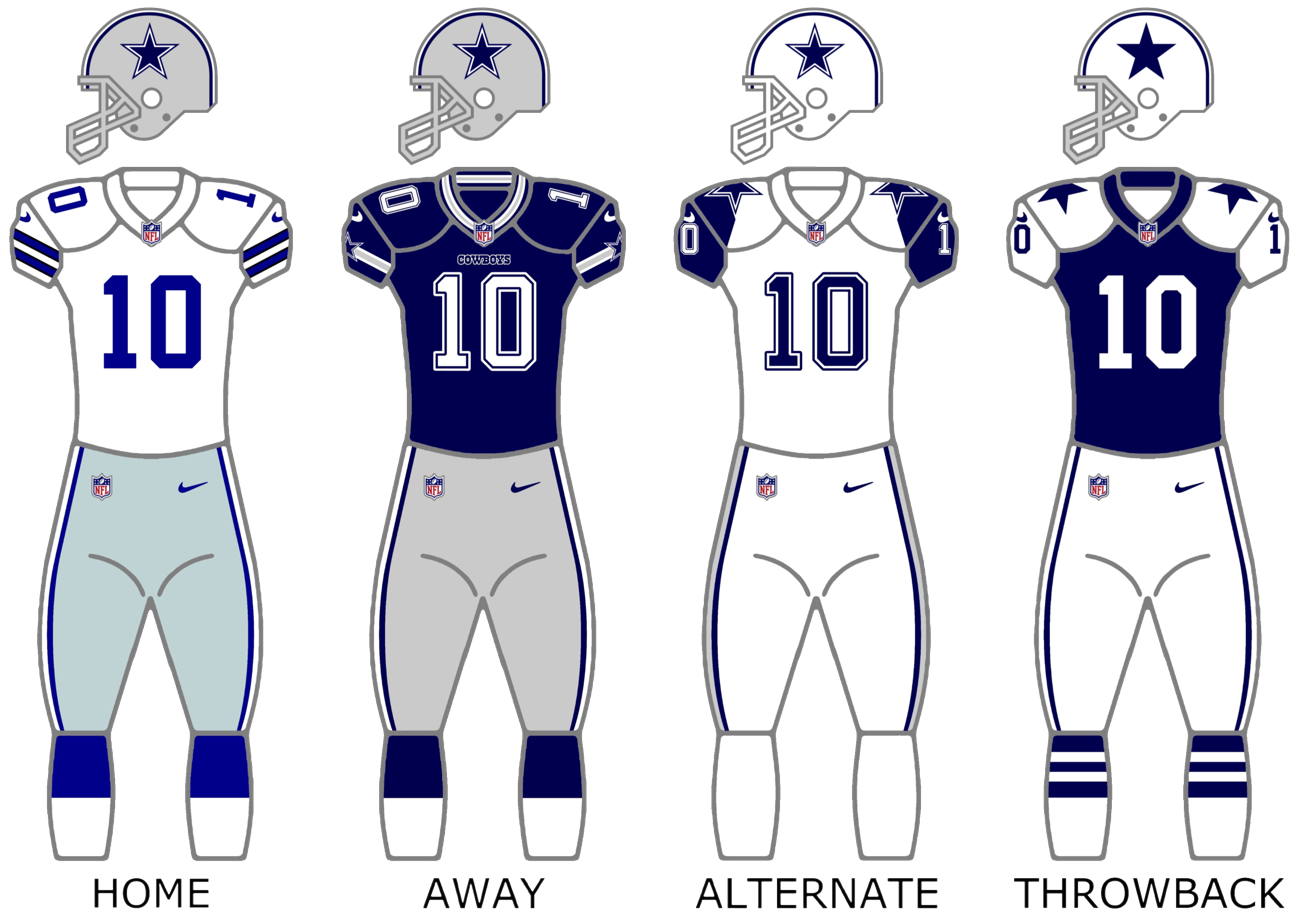

The 2022 season was the Dallas Cowboys' 63rd in the National Football League (NFL), their 14th playing home games at AT&T Stadium, and their third under head coach Mike McCarthy.

This was the first season since 2014 without offensive tackle La'el Collins on the roster, as he was released on March 18, 2022, and later signed with the Cincinnati Bengals. Despite losing to the Jacksonville Jaguars in Week 15, the Cowboys clinched a playoff berth after a loss by the Washington Commanders later that day. This marked the first time since 2006–2007 the Cowboys qualified for the postseason in consecutive seasons. After the Philadelphia Eagles beat the New York Giants in Week 18, the Cowboys failed to repeat as NFC East champions, extending the NFC East's repeat winner drought to 18 seasons. Their own loss to the Commanders that same day meant the Cowboys tied the previous year's 12–5 record.

In the wild-card round of the playoffs, the Cowboys defeated the Tampa Bay Buccaneers 31–14 to win their first road playoff game since their Super Bowl-winning 1992 season, and ended their winless streak against Tom Brady in what proved to be Brady's last game in his career. However, they were defeated by the San Francisco 49ers for the second consecutive season, this time in the divisional round, their seventh consecutive divisional round defeat.

== Offseason ==
=== Signings ===
| Position | Player | Age | 2021 team | Contract |
|---|---|---|---|---|
| FB | Ryan Nall | 27 | Chicago Bears | 1 year, $965,000 |
| WR | James Washington | 26 | Pittsburgh Steelers | 1 year, $1.187 million |
| OT | Jason Peters | 40 | Chicago Bears | 1 year, $358,200 |
| DE | Dante Fowler | 28 | Atlanta Falcons | 1 year, $3 million |
| OLB | Anthony Barr | 30 | Minnesota Vikings | 1 year, $3 million |
| MLB | Malik Jefferson | 26 | Indianapolis Colts | 1 year, $965,000 |

=== Re-signings ===
| Position | Player | Age | Contract |
|---|---|---|---|
| WR | Noah Brown | 26 | 1 year, $1.187 million |
| WR | Michael Gallup | 26 | 5 years, $62.5 million |
| TE | Jeremy Sprinkle | 28 | 1 year, $1 million |
| DE | Dorance Armstrong | 25 | 2 years, $13 million |
| DT | Carlos Watkins | 29 | 1 year, $1.187 million |
| LB | Luke Gifford | 27 | 1 year, $1.1 million |
| LB | Leighton Vander Esch | 26 | 1 year, $3 million |
| FS | Malik Hooker | 26 | 2 years, $8 million |
| SS | Jayron Kearse | 28 | 2 years, $10 million |
| P | Bryan Anger | 34 | 3 years, $9 million |
| LS | Jake McQuaide | 35 | 1 year, $1.2 million |

=== Departures ===
| Position | Player | Age | 2022 team |
|---|---|---|---|
| RB | Corey Clement | 28 | Arizona Cardinals |
| WR | Amari Cooper | 28 | Cleveland Browns |
| WR | Malik Turner | 26 | Las Vegas Raiders |
| WR | Cedrick Wilson Jr. | 27 | Miami Dolphins |
| TE | Blake Jarwin | 28 | Unsigned |
| OT | La'el Collins | 29 | Cincinnati Bengals |
| OT | Mitch Hyatt | 25 | Unsigned |
| OT | Ty Nsekhe | 37 | Los Angeles Rams |
| OG | Connor Williams | 25 | Miami Dolphins |
| DE | Bradlee Anae | 24 | New York Jets |
| DE | Randy Gregory | 30 | Denver Broncos |
| DT | Brent Urban | 31 | Baltimore Ravens |
| LB | Francis Bernard | 27 | Joined XFL |
| LB | Keanu Neal | 27 | Tampa Bay Buccaneers |
| CB | Maurice Canady | 28 | New York Giants |
| CB | Reggie Robinson II | 25 | Cleveland Browns |
| FS | Damontae Kazee | 29 | Pittsburgh Steelers |
| K | Greg Zuerlein | 35 | New York Jets |

== Draft ==
2022 Dallas Cowboys Draft
| Round | Selection | Player | Position | College | Notes |
|---|---|---|---|---|---|
| 1 | 24 | Tyler Smith | OT | Tulsa | |
| 2 | 56 | Sam Williams | DE | Ole Miss | |
| 3 | 88 | Jalen Tolbert | WR | South Alabama | |
| 4 | 129 | Jake Ferguson | TE | Wisconsin | |
| 5 | 155 | Matt Waletzko | OT | North Dakota | from Cleveland (Note: The Cowboys traded WR Amari Cooper and a sixth-round selection (202nd overall) to the Cleveland Browns in exchange for fifth- and sixth-round selections (155th and 193rd overall).) |
| 5 | 167 | DaRon Bland | CB | Fresno State | |
| 5 | 176 | Damone Clark | LB | LSU | Compensatory pick |
| 5 | 178 | John Ridgeway III | DT | Arkansas | Compensatory pick |
| 6 | 193 | Devin Harper | LB | Oklahoma State | from Cleveland |
| 6 | 202 | Traded to Cleveland | | | |
| 7 | 245 | Traded to Houston (Note: The Cowboys traded a seventh-round selection (245th overall) to the Houston Texans in exchange for DT Eli Ankou.) | | | |

Draft trades

2022 Dallas Cowboys undrafted free agents
| Name | Position | College | Ref. |
|---|---|---|---|
| Brandon Aubrey | K | Notre Dame | |
| Markquese Bell | S | Florida A&M | |
| Markaviest Bryant | DE | UCF | |
| Malik Davis | RB | Florida | |
| Dontario Drummond | WR | Ole Miss | |
| James Empey | C | BYU | |
| Ty Fryfogle | WR | Indiana | |
| Jonathan Garibay | K | Texas Tech | |
| Aaron Hansford | LB | Texas A&M | |
| Peyton Hendershot | TE | Indiana | |
| Dennis Houston | WR | Western Illinois | |
| Storey Jackson | LB | Liberty | |
| Alec Lindstrom | C | Boston College | |
| Quandre Mosely | CB | Kentucky | |
| Jaquarii Roberson | WR | Wake Forest | |
| Aaron Shampklin | RB | Harvard | |
| Amon Simon | OT | Texas A&M–Commerce | |
| Mike Tafua | DE | Utah | |
| Isaac Taylor-Stuart | CB | USC | |
| Juanyeh Thomas | S | Georgia Tech | |
| La'Kendrick Van Zandt | S | TCU | |

== Staff ==
2022 Dallas Cowboys staff
| Front office: Owner/president/general manager – Jerry Jones; COO/executive vice president/director of player personnel – Stephen Jones; Senior director of football operations/football administration – Todd Williams; Executive vice president/chief brand officer – Charlotte Jones Anderson; Executive vice president/Chief sales & marketing officer – Jerry Jones Jr.; Senior director of salary cap & player contracts – Adam Prasifka; Vice president player personnel – Will McClay; Director of team travel and logistics – Craig Glieber; Assistant director of football administration and technology – Jason McKay; Director of college scouting – Mitch LaPoint; Director of pro scouting – Alex Loomis; Director of advance scouting – Keith O'Quinn; Assistant director of college scouting – Chris Vaughn; College scouting coordinator – Chris Hall; Scouting video coordinator – Rich Behm; Executive assistant to the head coach – Laura Fryar; Head coaches: Head coach – Mike McCarthy; Assistant head coach – Rob Davis; Offensive coaches: Offensive coordinator – Kellen Moore; Quarterbacks – Doug Nussmeier; Running backs – Skip Peete; Wide receivers – Robert Prince; Tight ends – Lunda Wells; Offensive line – Joe Philbin; Assistant offensive line – Jeff Blasko; Quality control/offense – Chase Haslett; Offensive assistant – Scott Tolzien; Quality control/analytics – Kyle Valero | Defensive coaches: Defensive coordinator – Dan Quinn; Defensive line – Aden Durde; Assistant defensive line – Leon Lett; Linebackers – Scott McCurley; Defensive backs – Al Harris; Secondary/defensive pass game coordinator – Joe Whitt Jr.; Senior defensive assistant – George Edwards; Quality control/analytics – Ryan Feder; Quality control/defense – Cannon Matthews; Special teams coaches: Special teams coordinator – John Fassel; Assistant special teams – Rayna Stewart; Video/analytics – Justin Rudd; Quality control/analytics – Eric Simonelli; Strength and conditioning: Strength and conditioning coordinator – Harold Nash; Assistant strength and conditioning – Cedric Smith; Assistant strength and conditioning – Kendall Smith |

== Rosters ==
=== Opening preseason roster ===
Dallas Cowboys 2022 opening preseason roster
| Quarterbacks: 17 Ben DiNucci; 15 Will Grier; 4 Dak Prescott; 10 Cooper Rush; Running backs: 34 Malik Davis; 23 Rico Dowdle; 21 Ezekiel Elliott; 35 Ryan Nall FB; 20 Tony Pollard; 32 Aaron Shampklin; Wide receivers: 85 Noah Brown; 19 Dontario Drummond; 81 Simi Fehoko; 14 Ty Fryfogle; 3 Dennis Houston; 88 CeeDee Lamb; 6 Jaquarii Roberson; 80 Brandon Smith; 18 Jalen Tolbert; 2 KaVontae Turpin RS; 16 T. J. Vasher; 83 James Washington; Tight ends: 89 Ian Bunting; 48 Jake Ferguson; 49 Peyton Hendershot; 84 Sean McKeon; 86 Dalton Schultz; 87 Jeremy Sprinkle | Offensive linemen: 60 Isaac Alarcón G/T (Int.); 75 Josh Ball T; 63 Tyler Biadasz C; 76 Aviante Collins T; 64 James Empey G/C; 68 Matt Farniok C/G; 62 Braylon Jones G; 65 Alec Lindstrom C; 70 Zack Martin G; 66 Connor McGovern G/C; 61 Amon Simon T; 73 Tyler Smith G/T; 77 Tyron Smith T; 78 Terence Steele T; 71 Matt Waletzko T; Defensive linemen: 92 Dorance Armstrong DE; 93 Tarell Basham DE; 98 Quinton Bohanna DT; 94 Josiah Bronson DT; 59 Markaviest Bryant DE; 58 Austin Faoliu DT; 56 Dante Fowler DE; 96 Neville Gallimore DT; 99 Chauncey Golston DE; 72 Trysten Hill DT; 90 DeMarcus Lawrence DE; 97 Osa Odighizuwa DT; 95 John Ridgeway III DT; 52 Mika Tafua DE; 91 Carlos Watkins DT; 54 Sam Williams DE | Linebackers: 14 Jabril Cox MLB; 57 Luke Gifford OLB; 50 Devin Harper MLB; 47 Storey Jackson OLB; 45 Malik Jefferson MLB; 11 Micah Parsons OLB; 53 Christian Sam OLB; 55 Leighton Vander Esch MLB; Defensive backs: 41 Markquese Bell SS; 30 DaRon Bland CB; 3 Anthony Brown CB; 26 Kyron Brown CB; 31 Tyler Coyle FS; 7 Trevon Diggs CB; 29 C. J. Goodwin CB; 28 Malik Hooker FS; 1 Kelvin Joseph CB; 27 Jayron Kearse SS; 2 Jourdan Lewis CB; 39 Quandre Mosely CB; 24 Israel Mukuamu FS; 36 Isaac Taylor-Stuart CB; 40 Juanyeh Thomas FS; 6 Donovan Wilson SS; 25 Nahshon Wright CB; Special teams: 5 Bryan Anger P; 9 Lirim Hajrullahu K; 19 Brett Maher K; 44 Jake McQuaide LS | Reserve lists: 51 Anthony Barr OLB (Active/PUP); -- Devante Bond OLB (IR); 33 Damone Clark MLB (Active/NF-Inj.); 13 Michael Gallup WR (Active/PUP); 90 active (+1 exempt), 1 inactive |

=== Week one roster ===
Dallas Cowboys 2022 week one roster
| Quarterbacks: 4 Dak Prescott; 10 Cooper Rush (Elevated); Running backs: 23 Rico Dowdle; 21 Ezekiel Elliott; 20 Tony Pollard; Wide receivers: 85 Noah Brown; 81 Simi Fehoko; 13 Michael Gallup; 17 Dennis Houston; 88 CeeDee Lamb; 18 Jalen Tolbert; 9 KaVontae Turpin RS; Tight ends: 87 Jake Ferguson; 89 Peyton Hendershot; 86 Dalton Schultz | Offensive linemen: 75 Josh Ball T; 63 Tyler Biadasz C; 68 Matt Farniok C/G; 70 Zack Martin G; 66 Connor McGovern G; 73 Tyler Smith T/G; 78 Terence Steele T; 79 Matt Waletzko T; Defensive linemen: 92 Dorance Armstrong DE; 93 Tarell Basham DE; 98 Quinton Bohanna DT; 56 Dante Fowler DE; 96 Neville Gallimore DT; 99 Chauncey Golston DE; 72 Trysten Hill DT; 90 DeMarcus Lawrence DE; 97 Osa Odighizuwa DT; 95 John Ridgeway III DT; 54 Sam Williams DE | Linebackers: 42 Anthony Barr OLB; 14 Jabril Cox MLB/OLB; 57 Luke Gifford OLB; 50 Devin Harper MLB; 11 Micah Parsons OLB; 55 Leighton Vander Esch MLB; Defensive backs: 41 Markquese Bell SS; 26 DaRon Bland CB; 3 Anthony Brown CB; 7 Trevon Diggs CB; 29 C. J. Goodwin CB; 28 Malik Hooker FS; 1 Kelvin Joseph CB; 27 Jayron Kearse SS; 2 Jourdan Lewis CB; 24 Israel Mukuamu FS; 6 Donovan Wilson SS; 25 Nahshon Wright CB; Special teams: 5 Bryan Anger P; 19 Brett Maher K (Elevated); 44 Jake McQuaide LS | Reserve lists: 51 Devante Bond OLB (IR); -- Ian Bunting TE (IR); 33 Damone Clark MLB (NF-Inj.); 77 Tyron Smith T (IR); 36 Isaac Taylor-Stuart CB (IR); 83 James Washington WR (IR); Practice squad: 60 Isaac Alarcón G/T (Int.); 76 Aviante Collins T; 31 Tyler Coyle FS; 34 Malik Davis RB; 19 Dontario Drummond WR; 15 Will Grier QB; 46 Malik Jefferson MLB/OLB; 65 Alec Lindstrom C; 84 Sean McKeon TE; 30 Qadree Ollison RB; 71 Jason Peters T; 80 Brandon Smith WR; 40 Juanyeh Thomas FS; 91 Carlos Watkins DT/DE; 55 active, 6 inactive, 14 practice squad (+1 exempt) |

=== Final roster ===
2022 Dallas Cowboys roster
| Quarterbacks (QB): 15 Will Grier; 4 Dak Prescott; 10 Cooper Rush; Running backs (RB): 34 Malik Davis; 21 Ezekiel Elliott; 20 Tony Pollard; Wide receivers (WR): 85 Noah Brown; 16 T. Y. Hilton; 13 Michael Gallup; 88 CeeDee Lamb; 18 Jalen Tolbert; 9 KaVontae Turpin; Tight ends (TE): 87 Jake Ferguson; 89 Peyton Hendershot; 84 Sean McKeon; 86 Dalton Schultz | Offensive linemen (OL): 75 Josh Ball T; 63 Tyler Biadasz C; 76 Aviante Collins T; 70 Zack Martin G; 66 Connor McGovern G/C; 71 Jason Peters T; 73 Tyler Smith T/G; 77 Tyron Smith T; Defensive linemen (DL): 92 Dorance Armstrong DE; 98 Quinton Bohanna DT; 56 Dante Fowler DE; 96 Neville Gallimore DT; 99 Chauncey Golston DE; 95 Johnathan Hankins DT; 90 DeMarcus Lawrence DE; 97 Osa Odighizuwa DT; 91 Carlos Watkins DT; 54 Sam Williams DE | Linebackers (LB): 42 Anthony Barr OLB; 14 Jabril Cox MLB; 57 Luke Gifford OLB; 33 Damone Clark MLB/OLB; 11 Micah Parsons OLB; 55 Leighton Vander Esch MLB; Defensive backs (DB): 41 Markquese Bell SS; 26 DaRon Bland CB; 7 Trevon Diggs CB; 29 C. J. Goodwin CB; 28 Malik Hooker FS/SS; 1 Kelvin Joseph CB; 27 Jayron Kearse SS; 24 Israel Mukuamu SS; 6 Donovan Wilson FS; 25 Nahshon Wright CB; Special teams (ST): 5 Bryan Anger P; 19 Brett Maher K; 45 Matt Overton LS | Practice squad: 60 Isaac Alarcón T (IPP); 34 Mackensie Alexander CB (PS/I); 14 Antonio Callaway WR; 31 Tyler Coyle FS; 16 Dontario Drummond WR; 67 Brock Hoffman C/G; 17 Dennis Houston WR; 46 Malik Jefferson OLB; 65 Alec Lindstrom C (PS/I); 59 Takkarist McKinley DE; 30 Qadree Ollison RB; 20 Sheldrick Redwine FS; 39 Xavier Rhodes CB; 94 Anthony Rush DT; 32 Kendall Sheffield CB; 80 Brandon Smith WR; 69 Alex Taylor T; 40 Juanyeh Thomas FS (PS/I); 3 Tristan Vizcaino K; Reserve: 51 Devante Bond OLB (IR); 3 Anthony Brown CB (IR); 49 Ian Bunting TE (IR); 23 Rico Dowdle RB (IR); 68 Matt Farniok G/C (IR); 81 Simi Fehoko WR (IR); 50 Devin Harper MLB (IR/DFR); 2 Jourdan Lewis CB (IR); 44 Jake McQuaide LS (IR); 78 Terence Steele T (IR); -- Isaac Taylor-Stuart CB (IR); 71 Matt Waletzko T (IR); Rookies in italics 53 active, 12 reserve, 15 practice squad (4 exempt) |

== Preseason ==
The Cowboys' preseason opponents and schedule was announced in the spring.

| Week | Date | Opponent | Result | Record | Venue | Recap |
|---|---|---|---|---|---|---|
| 1 | August 13 | at Denver Broncos | L 7–17 | 0–1 | Empower Field | Recap |
| 2 | August 20 | at Los Angeles Chargers | W 32–18 | 1–1 | SoFi Stadium | Recap |
| 3 | August 26 | Seattle Seahawks | W 27–26 | 2–1 | AT&T Stadium | Recap |

== Regular season ==
=== Schedule ===
| Week | Date | Opponent | Result | Record | Venue | Recap |
|---|---|---|---|---|---|---|
| 1 | September 11 | Tampa Bay Buccaneers | **L** 3–19 | 0–1 | AT&T Stadium | Recap |
| 2 | September 18 | Cincinnati Bengals | **W** 20–17 | 1–1 | AT&T Stadium | Recap |
| 3 | September 26 | at **New York Giants** | **W** 23–16 | 2–1 | MetLife Stadium | Recap |
| 4 | October 2 | **Washington Commanders** | **W** 25–10 | 3–1 | AT&T Stadium | Recap |
| 5 | October 9 | at Los Angeles Rams | **W** 22–10 | 4–1 | SoFi Stadium | Recap |
| 6 | October 16 | at **Philadelphia Eagles** | **L** 17–26 | 4–2 | Lincoln Financial Field | Recap |
| 7 | October 23 | Detroit Lions | **W** 24–6 | 5–2 | AT&T Stadium | Recap |
| 8 | October 30 | Chicago Bears | **W** 49–29 | 6–2 | AT&T Stadium | Recap |
| 9 | Bye | | | | | |
| 10 | November 13 | at Green Bay Packers | **L** 28–31 (OT) | 6–3 | Lambeau Field | Recap |
| 11 | November 20 | at Minnesota Vikings | **W** 40–3 | 7–3 | U.S. Bank Stadium | Recap |
| 12 | November 24 | **New York Giants** | **W** 28–20 | 8–3 | AT&T Stadium | Recap |
| 13 | December 4 | Indianapolis Colts | **W** 54–19 | 9–3 | AT&T Stadium | Recap |
| 14 | December 11 | Houston Texans | **W** 27–23 | 10–3 | AT&T Stadium | Recap |
| 15 | December 18 | at Jacksonville Jaguars | **L** 34–40 (OT) | 10–4 | TIAA Bank Field | Recap |
| 16 | December 24 | **Philadelphia Eagles** | **W** 40–34 | 11–4 | AT&T Stadium | Recap |
| 17 | December 29 | at Tennessee Titans | **W** 27–13 | 12–4 | Nissan Stadium | Recap |
| 18 | January 8 | at **Washington Commanders** | **L** 6–26 | 12–5 | FedExField | Recap |

Note: Intra-division opponents are in bold text.

=== Game summaries ===
==== Week 1: vs. Tampa Bay Buccaneers ====
Week 1: Tampa Bay Buccaneers at Dallas Cowboys – Game summary

| Quarter | 1 | 2 | 3 | 4 | Total |
|---|---|---|---|---|---|
| **Buccaneers** | 6 | 6 | 7 | 0 | **19** |
| Cowboys | 3 | 0 | 0 | 0 | **3** |

at AT&T Stadium, Arlington, Texas

- Date: September 11
- Game time: 7:20 p.m. CDT
- Game weather: None (retractable roof closed)
- Game attendance: 93,797
- Referee: Ronald Torbert
- TV announcers (NBC): Mike Tirico, Cris Collinsworth and Melissa Stark
- Recap, Game Book

Game information

**First quarter**

- DAL – Brett Maher 51-yard field goal, 9:02. Cowboys 3–0. **Drive: 14 plays, 54 yards, 5:58.**
- TB – Ryan Succop 44-yard field goal, 5:05. Tied 3–3. **Drive: 7 plays, 49 yards, 3:57.**
- TB – Ryan Succop 38-yard field goal, 1:06. Buccaneers 6–3. **Drive: 7 plays, 49 yards, 2:47.**

**Second quarter**

- TB – Ryan Succop 29-yard field goal, 3:25. Buccaneers 9–3. **Drive: 5 plays, 12 yards, 2:41.**
- TB – Ryan Succop 47-yard field goal, 0:14. Buccaneers 12–3. **Drive: 8 plays, 61 yards, 1:32.**

**Third quarter**

- TB – Mike Evans 5-yard pass from Tom Brady (Ryan Succop kick), 3:23. Buccaneers 19–3. **Drive: 9 plays, 79 yards, 4:44.**

**Fourth quarter**

- **No scoring plays.**

**Top passers**

- TB – Tom Brady – 18/27, 212 yards, TD, INT
- DAL – Dak Prescott – 14/29, 134 yards, INT

**Top rushers**

- TB – Leonard Fournette – 21 rushes, 127 yards
- DAL – Ezekiel Elliott – 10 rushes, 52 yards

**Top receivers**

- TB – Mike Evans – 5 receptions, 71 yards, TD
- DAL – Noah Brown – 5 receptions, 68 yards

Despite a strong defensive effort, the Cowboys could not keep pace against Tom Brady and the Tampa Bay Buccaneers, and failed to find the end zone in their season opener. The 19–3 loss dropped Dallas to 0–1 on the season and 0–7 all time against Brady-led teams. The three points were also the Cowboys' lowest total for a season opener since the infamous 1989 season, when they were shut out by the New Orleans Saints. Worsening matters further, quarterback Dak Prescott injured his right hand late in the fourth quarter, which was revealed after the game to be a thumb fracture. Cowboys owner Jerry Jones announced immediately after the game that Prescott would undergo surgery the following day, sidelining him for several weeks. Backup quarterback Cooper Rush was announced as the starter for Dallas in Prescott's absence.

==== Week 2: vs. Cincinnati Bengals ====
Week 2: Cincinnati Bengals at Dallas Cowboys – Game summary

| Quarter | 1 | 2 | 3 | 4 | Total |
|---|---|---|---|---|---|
| Bengals | 3 | 0 | 6 | 8 | **17** |
| **Cowboys** | 14 | 3 | 0 | 3 | **20** |

at AT&T Stadium, Arlington, Texas

- Date: September 18
- Game time: 3:25 p.m. CDT
- Game weather: None (retractable roof closed)
- Game attendance: 92,944
- Referee: Brad Allen
- TV announcers (CBS): Jim Nantz, Tony Romo and Tracy Wolfson
- Recap, Game Book

Game information

**First quarter**

- DAL – Noah Brown 9-yard pass from Cooper Rush (Brett Maher kick), 8:35. Cowboys 7–0. **Drive: 12 plays, 75 yards, 6:25.**
- CIN – Evan McPherson 43-yard field goal, 3:05. Cowboys 7–3. **Drive: 9 plays, 50 yards, 5:30.**
- DAL – Tony Pollard 1-yard run (Brett Maher kick), 0:17. Cowboys 14–3. **Drive: 6 plays, 75 yards, 2:48.**

**Second quarter**

- DAL – Brett Maher 54-yard field goal, 0:09. Cowboys 17–3. **Drive: 6 plays, 13 yards, 0:42.**

**Third quarter**

- CIN – Evan McPherson 50-yard field goal, 9:41. Cowboys 17–6. **Drive: 11 plays, 43 yards, 5:19.**
- CIN – Evan McPherson 46-yard field goal, 4:05. Cowboys 17–9. **Drive: 7 plays, 31 yards, 3:55.**

**Fourth quarter**

- CIN – Tee Higgins 5-yard pass from Joe Burrow (Joe Burrow-Tyler Boyd pass), 3:45. Tied 17–17. **Drive: 7 plays, 16 yards, 2:08.**
- DAL – Brett Maher 50-yard field goal, 0:00. Cowboys 20–17. **Drive: 6 plays, 33 yards, 0:57.**

**Top passers**

- CIN – Joe Burrow – 24/36, 199 yards, TD
- DAL – Cooper Rush – 19/31, 235 yards, TD

**Top rushers**

- CIN – Joe Mixon – 19 rushes, 57 yards
- DAL – Ezekiel Elliott – 15 rushes, 53 yards

**Top receivers**

- CIN – Tee Higgins – 6 receptions, 71 yards, TD
- DAL – CeeDee Lamb – 7 receptions, 75 yards

The Cowboys hosted the Bengals hoping to avoid their first 0–2 start since 2010. The Cowboys led 17–3 at halftime, though they allowed the Bengals to tie the game at 17. The Cowboys defense gave Joe Burrow and the Bengals a hard time throughout the game, as Micah Parsons registered multiple sacks on Joe Burrow. In the final minutes of the game, the Cowboys forced the Bengals to punt, and drove the ball to field goal range. In the fading seconds, Brett Maher kicked a game winning field goal to help the Cowboys stave off the Bengals comeback to improve to 1–1.

==== Week 3: at New York Giants ====
Week 3: Dallas Cowboys at New York Giants – Game summary

| Quarter | 1 | 2 | 3 | 4 | Total |
|---|---|---|---|---|---|
| **Cowboys** | 3 | 3 | 7 | 10 | **23** |
| Giants | 0 | 3 | 10 | 3 | **16** |

at MetLife Stadium, East Rutherford, New Jersey

- Date: September 26
- Game time: 8:15 p.m. EDT/7:15 p.m. CDT
- Game weather: Fair, 66 °F (19 °C)
- Game attendance: 79,445
- Referee: Land Clark
- TV announcers (ESPN/ABC): Joe Buck, Troy Aikman and Lisa Salters
- Recap, Game Book

Game information

**First quarter**

- DAL – Brett Maher 26-yard field goal, 2:09. Cowboys 3–0. **Drive: 10 plays, 55 yards, 3:01.**

**Second quarter**

- NYG – Graham Gano 42-yard field goal, 11:17. Tied 3–3. **Drive: 14 plays, 51 yards, 5:22.**
- DAL – Brett Maher 28-yard field goal, 9:09. Cowboys 6–3. **Drive: 5 plays, 53 yards, 2:08.**

**Third quarter**

- NYG – Graham Gano 51-yard field goal, 9:02. Tied 6–6. **Drive: 10 plays, 42 yards, 5:58.**
- NYG – Saquon Barkley 36-yard rush (Graham Gano kick), 5:31. Giants 13–6. **Drive: 6 plays, 77 yards, 2:29.**
- DAL – Ezekiel Elliott 1-yard rush (Brett Maher kick), 0:27. Tied 13–13. **Drive: 9 plays, 75 yards, 5:04.**

**Fourth quarter**

- DAL – CeeDee Lamb 1-yard pass from Cooper Rush (Brett Maher kick), 8:30. Cowboys 20–13. **Drive: 11 plays, 89 yards, 6:12.**
- DAL – Brett Maher 44-yard field goal, 5:58. Cowboys 23–13. **Drive: 4 plays, 9 yards, 1:34.**
- NYG – Graham Gano 51-yard field goal, 3:37. Cowboys 23–16. **Drive: 9 plays, 42 yards, 2:21.**

**Top passers**

- DAL – Cooper Rush – 21/31, 215 yards, TD
- NYG – Daniel Jones – 20/37, 196 yards, INT

**Top rushers**

- DAL – Tony Pollard – 13 rushes, 105 yards
- NYG – Saquon Barkley – 14 rushes, 81 yards, TD

**Top receivers**

- DAL – CeeDee Lamb – 8 receptions, 87 yards, TD
- NYG – Sterling Shepard – 5 receptions, 49 yards

The Cowboys led 6–3 at half but missed opportunities to blow the game open. Even though they blocked a Giants field goal attempt, referees missed a defensive pass interference call which would have given the Cowboys a 1st and Goal on the 1-yard line, and CeeDee Lamb uncharacteristically dropped a big catch that could've been a touchdown. The Giants got the ball to start the third quarter and scored on their first two drives, the second a touchdown run by Saquon Barkley to give the Giants a 13–6 lead. The Cowboys responded with a touchdown run by Ezekiel Elliott, then stopped the Giants on 4th down the next drive. On their next drive, Lamb converted on a 4th and 4 and finished the drive with a one-handed touchdown catch to take a 20–13 lead. The Cowboys forced a three-and-out and started their next drive in field goal range to make it a two-score game after a big punt return. The Giants responded with a field goal to cut the deficit and had a chance to tie the game, but Trevon Diggs sealed the win with his first interception of the season.

DeMarcus Lawrence finished with 3 sacks on the night, and the Cowboys defense had 5 total. The Cowboys improved to 2–1, and Cooper Rush became 3–0 as the Cowboys starting quarterback.

==== Week 4: vs. Washington Commanders ====
Week 4: Washington Commanders at Dallas Cowboys – Game summary

| Quarter | 1 | 2 | 3 | 4 | Total |
|---|---|---|---|---|---|
| Commanders | 0 | 7 | 3 | 0 | **10** |
| **Cowboys** | 3 | 9 | 3 | 10 | **25** |

at AT&T Stadium, Arlington, Texas

- Date: October 2
- Game time: 12:00 p.m. CDT
- Game weather: None (retractable roof closed)
- Game attendance: 92,946
- Referee: Shawn Smith
- TV announcers (Fox): Kevin Burkhardt, Greg Olsen, Erin Andrews and Tom Rinaldi
- Recap, Game Book

Game information

**First quarter**

- DAL – Brett Maher 53-yard field goal, 11:34. Cowboys 3–0. **Drive: 7 plays, 40 yards, 3:26.**

**Second quarter**

- DAL – Brett Maher 45-yard field goal, 14:56. Cowboys 6–0. **Drive: 7 plays, 60 yards, 2:48.**
- WAS – Jahan Dotson 10-yard pass from Carson Wentz (Joey Slye kick), 7:05. Commanders 7–6. **Drive: 7 plays, 65 yards, 3:35.**
- DAL – Michael Gallup 9-yard pass from Cooper Rush (kick blocked), 1:04. Cowboys 12–7. **Drive: 15 plays, 75 yards, 6:01.**

**Third quarter**

- DAL – Brett Maher 28-yard field goal, 4:56. Cowboys 15–7. **Drive: 5 plays, 52 yards, 2:52.**
- WAS – Joey Slye 45-yard field goal, 1:45. Cowboys 15–10. **Drive: 8 plays, 48 yards, 3:29.**

**Fourth quarter**

- DAL – CeeDee Lamb 30-yard pass from Cooper Rush (Brett Maher kick), 14:54. Cowboys 22–10. **Drive: 3 plays, 75 yards, 1:33.**
- DAL – Brett Maher 29-yard field goal, 3:51. Cowboys 25–10. **Drive: 4 plays, 9 yards, 1:38.**

**Top passers**

- WAS – Carson Wentz – 25/42, 170 yards, TD, 2 INT
- DAL – Cooper Rush – 15/27, 223 yards, 2 TD

**Top rushers**

- WAS – Antonio Gibson – 13 rushes, 49 yards
- DAL – Ezekiel Elliott – 19 rushes, 49 yards

**Top receivers**

- WAS – Jahan Dotson – 3 receptions, 43 yards, TD
- DAL – CeeDee Lamb – 6 receptions, 97 yards, TD

==== Week 5: at Los Angeles Rams ====
Week 5: Dallas Cowboys at Los Angeles Rams – Game summary

| Quarter | 1 | 2 | 3 | 4 | Total |
|---|---|---|---|---|---|
| **Cowboys** | 9 | 7 | 3 | 3 | **22** |
| Rams | 3 | 7 | 0 | 0 | **10** |

at SoFi Stadium, Inglewood, California

- Date: October 9
- Game time: 3:25 p.m. CDT/1:25 p.m. PDT
- Game weather: Sunny, 74 °F (23 °C)
- Game attendance: 74,154
- Referee: Bill Vinovich
- TV announcers (Fox): Kevin Burkhardt, Greg Olsen, Erin Andrews and Tom Rinaldi
- Recap, Game Book

Game information

**First quarter**

- DAL – DeMarcus Lawrence 19-yard fumble return (run failed), 13:27. Cowboys 6–0.
- DAL – Brett Maher 33-yard field goal, 8:43. Cowboys 9–0. **Drive: 4 plays, 5 yards, 0:51.**
- LAR – Matt Gay 29-yard field goal, 5:22. Cowboys 9–3. **Drive: 7 plays, 65 yards, 3:21.**

**Second quarter**

- LAR – Cooper Kupp 75-yard pass from Matthew Stafford (Matt Gay kick), 9:31. Rams 10–9. **Drive: 3 plays, 83 yards, 1:29.**
- DAL – Tony Pollard 57-yard run (Brett Maher kick), 7:59. Cowboys 16–10. **Drive: 3 plays, 75 yards, 1:32.**

**Third quarter**

- DAL – Brett Maher 40-yard field goal, 8:11. Cowboys 19–10. **Drive: 13 plays, 53 yards, 6:49.**

**Fourth quarter**

- DAL – Brett Maher 36-yard field goal, 5:32. Cowboys 22–10. **Drive: 9 plays, 35 yards, 5:37.**

**Top passers**

- DAL – Cooper Rush – 10/16, 102 yards
- LAR – Matthew Stafford – 28/42, 308 yards, TD, INT

**Top rushers**

- DAL – Tony Pollard – 8 rushes, 86 yards, TD
- LAR – Cam Akers – 13 rushes, 33 yards

**Top receivers**

- DAL – CeeDee Lamb – 5 receptions, 53 yards
- LAR – Cooper Kupp – 7 receptions, 125 yards, TD

==== Week 6: at Philadelphia Eagles ====
Week 6: Dallas Cowboys at Philadelphia Eagles – Game summary

| Quarter | 1 | 2 | 3 | 4 | Total |
|---|---|---|---|---|---|
| Cowboys | 0 | 3 | 7 | 7 | **17** |
| **Eagles** | 0 | 20 | 0 | 6 | **26** |

at Lincoln Financial Field, Philadelphia, Pennsylvania

- Date: October 16
- Game time: 8:20 p.m. EDT/7:20 p.m. CDT
- Game weather: Clear, 63 °F (17 °C)
- Game attendance: 69,879
- Referee: John Hussey
- TV announcers (NBC): Mike Tirico, Cris Collinsworth and Melissa Stark
- Recap, Game Book

Game information

**First quarter**

- No scoring plays.

**Second quarter**

- PHI – Miles Sanders 5-yard run (Jake Elliott kick), 14:55. Eagles 7–0. **Drive: 15 plays, 80 yards, 7:36.**
- PHI – A. J. Brown 15-yard pass from Jalen Hurts (Jake Elliott kick), 10:40. Eagles 14–0. **Drive: 7 plays, 44 yards, 4:07.**
- PHI – Jake Elliott 51-yard field goal, 7:53. Eagles 17–0 **Drive: 4 plays, 1 yards, 1:31.**
- PHI – Jake Elliott 34-yard field goal, 1:47. Eagles 20–0 **Drive: 8 plays, 30 yards, 3:27.**
- DAL – Brett Maher 30-yard field goal, 0:29. Eagles 20–3. **Drive: 9 plays, 29 yards, 1:18.**

**Third quarter**

- DAL – Ezekiel Elliott 14-yard run (Brett Maher kick), 8:19. Eagles 20–10. **Drive: 9 plays, 79 yards, 4:28.**

**Fourth quarter**

- DAL – Jake Ferguson 7-yard pass from Cooper Rush (Brett Maher kick), 14:39. Eagles 20–17. **Drive: 15 plays, 93 yards, 7:07.**
- PHI – DeVonta Smith 7-yard pass from Jalen Hurts (run failed), 7:02. Eagles 26–17. **Drive: 13 plays, 75 yards, 7:37.**

**Top passers**

- DAL – Cooper Rush – 18/38, 181 yards, TD, 3 INT
- PHI – Jalen Hurts – 15/25, 155 yards, 2 TD

**Top rushers**

- DAL – Ezekiel Elliott – 13 rushes, 81 yards, TD
- PHI – Miles Sanders – 18 rushes, 71 yards, TD

**Top receivers**

- DAL – CeeDee Lamb – 5 receptions, 68 yards
- PHI – A. J. Brown – 5 receptions, 67 yards, TD

The Cowboys traveled to Philadelphia, looking to continue their momentum and hand the undefeated Eagles their first loss. Following a scoreless first quarter, Philadelphia scored first on a Miles Sanders touchdown run for a 7–0 lead. Cooper Rush was intercepted by Chauncey Gardner-Johnson on the first play of the ensuing drive, and the Eagles doubled their lead seven plays later on an A. J. Brown touchdown reception. The Eagles added two field goals following a Cowboys' three-and-out and another interception to make the score 20–0. This time, the Cowboys finally rebounded, as KaVontae Turpin returned the kickoff after the second field goal to the Eagles' 41. Rush threw a pass to Noah Brown in the endzone for a touchdown, but the play was reversed after Brown was deemed to have landed out of bounds. The Cowboys settled for a Brett Maher field goal, cutting the deficit to 20–3. Dallas sprung to life in the second half, getting a defensive stop against the Eagles and following it up with a quick scoring drive culminating in a 14-yard touchdown run by Ezekiel Elliott. The defense stopped Philadelphia again, and the offense again put together a scoring drive, capped by a 7-yard touchdown reception by Jake Ferguson to pull within three points. However, this was the closest the Cowboys would get to the Eagles, as Philadelphia answered with a long drive of their own, culminating in a 7-yard touchdown catch by DeVonta Smith, making the score 26–17 following a failed two-point conversion. Rush threw his third interception of the night four plays later, allowing the Eagles to burn more time off the clock before punting back to the Cowboys. Needing a touchdown and a field goal to take the lead, Dallas drove to the Philadelphia 41, but a 59-yard field goal attempt by Maher sailed wide right, sealing the Cowboys' fate. Dallas dropped to 4–2 with the 26–17 loss, and fell to third place in the NFC East thanks to the New York Giants winning earlier that day. This was Cooper Rush's first career loss as a starter after beginning his career with a 5–0 record.

==== Week 7: vs. Detroit Lions ====
Week 7: Detroit Lions at Dallas Cowboys – Game summary

| Quarter | 1 | 2 | 3 | 4 | Total |
|---|---|---|---|---|---|
| Lions | 3 | 3 | 0 | 0 | **6** |
| **Cowboys** | 0 | 3 | 7 | 14 | **24** |

at AT&T Stadium, Arlington, Texas

- Date: October 23
- Game time: 12:00 p.m. CDT
- Game weather: None (retractable roof closed)
- Game attendance: 93,487
- Referee: Adrian Hill
- TV announcers (CBS): Jim Nantz, Tony Romo and Tracy Wolfson
- Recap, Game Book

Game information

**First quarter**

- DET – Michael Badgley 40-yard field goal, 3:58. Lions 3–0. **Drive: 10 plays, 49 yards, 4:55.**

**Second quarter**

- DAL – Brett Maher 22-yard field goal, 12:24. Tied 3–3. **Drive: 12 plays, 72 yards, 6:34.**
- DET – Michael Badgley 53-yard field goal, 7:59. Lions 6–3. **Drive: 8 plays, 41 yards, 4:25.**

**Third quarter**

- DAL – Ezekiel Elliott 1-yard run (Brett Maher kick), 10:18. Cowboys 10–6. **Drive: 7 plays, 82 yards, 3:19.**

**Fourth quarter**

- DAL – Ezekiel Elliott 1-yard run (Brett Maher kick), 2:46. Cowboys 17–6. **Drive: 11 plays, 54 yards, 5:39.**
- DAL – Peyton Hendershot 2-yard pass from Dak Prescott (Brett Maher kick), 1:55. Cowboys 24–6. **Drive: 4 plays, 24 yards, 0:25.**

**Top passers**

- DET – Jared Goff – 21/26, 228 yards, 2 INT
- DAL – Dak Prescott – 19/25, 207 yards, TD

**Top rushers**

- DET – Jamaal Williams – 15 rushes, 79 yards
- DAL – Tony Pollard – 12 rushes, 83 yards

**Top receivers**

- DET – Kalif Raymond – 5 receptions, 75 yards
- DAL – CeeDee Lamb – 4 receptions, 70 yards

In Dak Prescott's first game back from a thumb injury, the Cowboys initially slumped by trailing 6–3 at halftime. The Cowboys blew the game open after a key fumble in the Lions' red zone, but forced another punt. The Cowboys defense forced five turnovers as the Cowboys dominated the remainder of the game. The Cowboys marched down the field in the fourth quarter after forcing a fumble by the Lions at the Dallas 1-yard line, denying the Lions a touchdown. Dak Prescott finished the game with his first touchdown pass of 2022. The Cowboys improved to 5–2, but remained in third place in the NFC East because the Giants also won their game that day.

==== Week 8: vs. Chicago Bears ====
Week 8: Chicago Bears at Dallas Cowboys – Game summary

| Quarter | 1 | 2 | 3 | 4 | Total |
|---|---|---|---|---|---|
| Bears | 0 | 17 | 6 | 6 | **29** |
| **Cowboys** | 14 | 14 | 14 | 7 | **49** |

at AT&T Stadium, Arlington, Texas

- Date: October 30
- Game time: 12:00 p.m. CDT
- Game weather: 66 °F (19 °C) (retractable roof open)
- Game attendance: 93,767
- Referee: Brad Rogers
- TV announcers (Fox): Adam Amin, Daryl Johnston and Pam Oliver
- Recap, Game Book

Game information

**First quarter**

- DAL – Dak Prescott 7-yard run (Brett Maher kick), 10:18. Cowboys 7–0. **Drive: 11 plays, 75 yards, 4:42.**
- DAL – CeeDee Lamb 21-yard pass from Dak Prescott (Brett Maher kick), 5:19. Cowboys 14–0. **Drive: 8 plays, 69 yards, 3:12.**

**Second quarter**

- CHI – Justin Fields 3-yard run (Cairo Santos kick), 13:41. Cowboys 14–7. **Drive: 12 plays, 75 yards, 6:38.**
- DAL – Tony Pollard 18-yard run (Brett Maher kick), 10:50. Cowboys 21–7. **Drive: 6 plays, 75 yards, 2:51.**
- DAL – Jake Ferguson 1-yard pass from Dak Prescott (Brett Maher kick), 6:48. Cowboys 28–7. **Drive: 8 plays, 54 yards, 2:35.**
- CHI – N'Keal Harry 17-yard pass from Justin Fields (Cairo Santos kick), 0:40. Cowboys 28–14. **Drive: 12 plays, 75 yards, 6:08.**
- CHI – Cairo Santos 36-yard field goal, 0:00. Cowboys 28–17. **Drive: 4 plays, 6 yards, 0:28.**

**Third quarter**

- CHI – Khalil Herbert 12-yard run (pass failed), 9:42. Cowboys 28–23. **Drive: 5 plays, 62 yards, 2:19.**
- DAL – Tony Pollard 7-yard run (Brett Maher kick), 6:51. Cowboys 35–23. **Drive: 7 plays, 75 yards, 2:51.**
- DAL – Micah Parsons 36-yard fumble return (Brett Maher kick), 5:00. Cowboys 42–23.

**Fourth quarter**

- CHI – Cole Kmet 10-yard pass from Justin Fields (pass failed), 13:40. Cowboys 42–29. **Drive: 13 plays, 75 yards, 6:20.**
- DAL – Tony Pollard 54-yard run (Brett Maher kick), 10:35. Cowboys 49–29. **Drive: 5 plays, 79 yards, 3:05.**

**Top passers**

- CHI – Justin Fields – 17/23, 151 yards, 2 TD
- DAL – Dak Prescott – 21/27, 250 yards, 2 TD, INT

**Top rushers**

- CHI – Khalil Herbert – 16 rushes, 99 yards, TD
- DAL – Tony Pollard – 14 rushes, 131 yards, 3 TD

**Top receivers**

- CHI – Darnell Mooney – 5 receptions, 70 yards
- DAL – CeeDee Lamb – 5 receptions, 77 yards, TD

Despite a weak defensive performance and the absence of Ezekiel Elliott, the Cowboys were superior to the Bears, who were just coming off an upset win against the Patriots. The Cowboys exploded in the first quarter, already going up by 14. The two teams exchanged two touchdowns to make the game 28–14. Shortly before halftime, an interception led to the Bears cutting the lead further. The Cowboys defense continued to struggle, as they left the game open after a fumble play was reversed. After the Bears cut the Cowboys lead to 28–23, the Cowboys offense marched down the field to pull their lead back up to make it 35–23. After several plays, Micah Parsons scored his first NFL touchdown after recovering a fumble untouched to give Dallas a 42–23 lead. The Cowboys and the Bears repeated exchange of touchdowns, with the Bears getting one but failing a two-point conversion attempt, and the former opting to converting an extra point, making the score 49–29. That was also the final score. This was Bears head coach Matt Eberflus' first return to Dallas in 5 years. Eberflus previously served as the Cowboys' linebackers coach and passing game coordinator from 2011–2017 under then-head coach Jason Garrett. The win not only improved the Cowboys to 6–2, but also moved them up to second place in the NFC East following a Giants loss to the Seahawks later that day.

==== Week 10: at Green Bay Packers ====
Week 10: Dallas Cowboys at Green Bay Packers – Game summary

| Quarter | 1 | 2 | 3 | 4 | OT | Total |
|---|---|---|---|---|---|---|
| Cowboys | 0 | 14 | 14 | 0 | 0 | **28** |
| **Packers** | 0 | 14 | 0 | 14 | 3 | **31** |

at Lambeau Field, Green Bay, Wisconsin

- Date: November 13
- Game time: 3:25 p.m. CST
- Game weather: Cloudy, 33 °F (1 °C)
- Game attendance: 78,433
- Referee: Brad Allen
- TV announcers (Fox): Kevin Burkhardt, Greg Olsen, Erin Andrews and Tom Rinaldi
- Recap, Game Book

Game information

**First quarter**

- No scoring plays.

**Second quarter**

- DAL – CeeDee Lamb 3-yard pass from Dak Prescott (Brett Maher kick), 9:52. Cowboys 7–0. **Drive: 17 plays, 83 yards, 8:21.**
- GB – Christian Watson 58-yard pass from Aaron Rodgers (Mason Crosby kick), 4:54. Tied 7–7. **Drive: 3 plays, 67 yards, 2:03.**
- GB – Aaron Jones 12-yard run (Mason Crosby kick), 1:42. Packers 14–7. **Drive: 3 plays, 24 yards, 0:38.**
- DAL – Dalton Schultz 5-yard pass from Dak Prescott (Brett Maher kick), 0:08. Tied 14–14. **Drive: 8 plays, 66 yards, 1:34.**

**Third quarter**

- DAL – Tony Pollard 13-yard run (Brett Maher kick), 7:14. Cowboys 21–14. **Drive: 4 plays, 45 yards, 1:15.**
- DAL – CeeDee Lamb 35-yard pass from Dak Prescott (Brett Maher kick), 2:47. Cowboys 28–14. **Drive: 7 plays, 86 yards, 2:47.**

**Fourth quarter**

- GB – Christian Watson 39-yard pass from Aaron Rodgers (Mason Crosby kick), 13:23. Cowboys 28–21. **Drive: 9 plays, 76 yards, 4:24.**
- GB – Christian Watson 7-yard pass from Aaron Rodgers (Mason Crosby kick), 2:29. Tied 28–28. **Drive: 10 plays, 89 yards, 6:28.**

**Overtime**

- GB – Mason Crosby 28-yard field goal, 3:06. Packers 31–28. **Drive: 6 plays, 55 yards, 3:09.**

**Top passers**

- DAL– Dak Prescott – 27/46, 265 yards, 3 TD, 2 INT
- GB – Aaron Rodgers – 14/20, 224 yards, 3 TD

**Top rushers**

- DAL – Tony Pollard – 22 rushes, 115 yards, TD
- GB – Aaron Jones – 24 rushes, 138 yards, TD

**Top receivers**

- DAL – CeeDee Lamb – 11 receptions, 150 yards, 2 TD
- GB – Christian Watson – 4 receptions, 107 yards, 3 TD

This was head coach Mike McCarthy's first return to Lambeau Field since his firing from the Packers late in the 2018 season. McCarthy previously served as Green Bay's head coach from 2006–2018, leading them to 9 playoff appearances and to the franchise's fourth Super Bowl title in Super Bowl XLV. The Cowboys blew a 28–14 lead and lost to Aaron Rodgers and the Packers, 31–28, in overtime, on a 28-yard field goal by Mason Crosby, resulting in their first ever loss after leading by 14 going into the 4th quarter. They were previously 195–0 in those circumstances. With the upset loss, the Cowboys fell to 6–3, and third in the NFC East after the Giants won earlier in the day.

==== Week 11: at Minnesota Vikings ====
Week 11: Dallas Cowboys at Minnesota Vikings – Game summary

| Quarter | 1 | 2 | 3 | 4 | Total |
|---|---|---|---|---|---|
| **Cowboys** | 10 | 13 | 14 | 3 | **40** |
| Vikings | 3 | 0 | 0 | 0 | **3** |

at U.S. Bank Stadium, Minneapolis, Minnesota

- Date: November 20
- Game time: 3:25 p.m. CST
- Game weather: None (indoor stadium)
- Game attendance: 65,304
- Referee: Clay Martin
- TV announcers (CBS): Jim Nantz, Tony Romo and Tracy Wolfson
- Recap, Game Book

Game information

**First quarter**

- DAL – Brett Maher 27-yard field goal, 10:22. Cowboys 3–0. **Drive: 7 plays, 18 yards, 3:22.**
- MIN – Greg Joseph 25-yard field goal, 6:39. Tied 3–3. **Drive: 10 plays, 69 yards, 3:43.**
- DAL – Ezekiel Elliott 1-yard run (Brett Maher kick), 1:26. Cowboys 10–3. **Drive: 10 plays, 75 yards, 5:13.**

**Second quarter**

- DAL – Brett Maher 53-yard field goal, 5:31. Cowboys 13–3. **Drive: 14 plays, 48 yards, 7:54.**
- DAL – Tony Pollard 30-yard pass from Dak Prescott (Brett Maher kick), 1:43. Cowboys 20–3. **Drive: 8 plays, 59 yards, 2:44.**
- DAL – Brett Maher 60-yard field goal, 0:00. Cowboys 23–3. **Drive: 5 plays, 44 yards, 0:31.**

**Third quarter**

- DAL – Tony Pollard 68-yard pass from Dak Prescott (Brett Maher kick), 12:32. Cowboys 30–3. **Drive: 5 plays, 75 yards, 2:28.**
- DAL – Ezekiel Elliott 1-yard run (Brett Maher kick), 8:15. Cowboys 37–3. **Drive: 5 plays, 41 yards, 1:54.**

**Fourth quarter**

- DAL – Brett Maher 50-yard field goal, 10:04. Cowboys 40–3. **Drive: 9 plays, 44 yards, 6:05.**

**Top passers**

- DAL – Dak Prescott – 22/25, 276 yards, 2 TD
- MIN – Kirk Cousins – 12/23, 105 yards

**Top rushers**

- DAL – Tony Pollard – 15 rushes, 80 yards
- MIN – Dalvin Cook – 11 rushes, 72 yards

**Top receivers**

- DAL – Tony Pollard – 6 receptions, 109 yards, 2 TD
- MIN – T. J. Hockenson – 5 receptions, 34 yards

The Cowboys demolished the Vikings on both sides of the ball. In Ezekiel Elliott's first game back from his knee injury, Elliott combined with Tony Pollard for four touchdowns against a Vikings team that had been rolling with a 7-game win streak. The Cowboys improved to 7–3 with this win, and the New York Giants' loss to the Detroit Lions earlier that day moved the Cowboys to second place. The Cowboys were the only team to defeat the Vikings at U.S. Bank Stadium during the regular season, as the Giants lost the final game at U.S. Bank Stadium in Week 16.

==== Week 12: vs. New York Giants ====
Thanksgiving Day games

Week 12: New York Giants at Dallas Cowboys – Game summary

| Quarter | 1 | 2 | 3 | 4 | Total |
|---|---|---|---|---|---|
| Giants | 3 | 10 | 0 | 7 | **20** |
| **Cowboys** | 0 | 7 | 14 | 7 | **28** |

at AT&T Stadium, Arlington, Texas

- Date: November 24
- Game time: 3:30 p.m. CST
- Game weather: None (retractable roof closed)
- Game attendance: 93,568
- Referee: Scott Novak
- TV announcers (Fox): Kevin Burkhardt, Greg Olsen, Tom Rinaldi and Erin Andrews
- Recap, Game Book

Game information

**First quarter**

- NYG – Graham Gano 57-yard field goal, 9:44. Giants 3–0. **Drive: 5 plays, 1 yard, 1:51.**

**Second quarter**

- DAL – Ezekiel Elliott 6-yard run (Brett Maher kick), 14:55. Cowboys 7–3. **Drive: 11 plays, 93 yards, 6:03.**
- NYG – Saquon Barkley 1-yard run (Graham Gano kick), 9:28. Giants 10–7. **Drive: 9 plays, 75 yards, 5:27.**
- NYG – Graham Gano 47-yard field goal, 0:00. Giants 13–7. **Drive: 8 plays, 44 yards, 1:50.**

**Third quarter**

- DAL – Dalton Schultz 15-yard pass from Dak Prescott (Brett Maher kick), 7:21. Cowboys 14–13. **Drive: 14 plays, 75 yards, 7:39.**
- DAL – Dalton Schultz 6-yard pass from Dak Prescott (Brett Maher kick), 2:02. Cowboys 21–13. **Drive: 6 plays, 44 yards, 2:05.**

**Fourth quarter**

- DAL – Peyton Hendershot 2-yard run (Brett Maher kick), 8:53. Cowboys 28–13. **Drive: 10 plays, 80 yards, 5:51.**
- NYG – Richie James 1-yard pass from Daniel Jones (Graham Gano kick), 0:08. Cowboys 28–20. **Drive: 7 plays, 64 yards, 1:05.**

**Top passers**

- NYG – Daniel Jones – 21/35, 228 yards, TD
- DAL – Dak Prescott – 21/30, 261 yards, 2 TD, 2 INT

**Top rushers**

- NYG – Saquon Barkley – 11 rushes, 39 yards, TD
- DAL – Ezekiel Elliott – 16 rushes, 92 yards, TD

**Top receivers**

- NYG – Darius Slayton – 3 receptions, 63 yards
- DAL – CeeDee Lamb – 6 receptions, 106 yards

Despite a rocky first half, the Cowboys dominated the rest of the way. This was the Cowboys' first Thanksgiving Day win since 2018, and the Cowboys improved to 8–3 on the season. For the first time since 2012, the Cowboys wore their classic throwback uniforms, thanks to the NFL rescinding the one-helmet rule.

At the time, this game set the record for the most watched regular season game in the NFL’s history.

==== Week 13: vs. Indianapolis Colts ====
Week 13: Indianapolis Colts at Dallas Cowboys – Game summary

| Quarter | 1 | 2 | 3 | 4 | Total |
|---|---|---|---|---|---|
| Colts | 10 | 3 | 6 | 0 | **19** |
| **Cowboys** | 7 | 14 | 0 | 33 | **54** |

at AT&T Stadium, Arlington, Texas

- Date: December 4
- Game time: 7:20 p.m. CST
- Game weather: None (retractable roof closed)
- Game attendance: 93,086
- Referee: Carl Cheffers
- TV announcers (NBC): Mike Tirico, Cris Collinsworth and Melissa Stark
- Recap, Game Book

Game information

**First quarter**

- IND – Chase McLaughlin 52-yard field goal, 10:49. Colts 3–0. **Drive: 6 plays, 20 yard, 2:42.**
- DAL – CeeDee Lamb 20-yard pass from Dak Prescott (Brett Maher kick), 4:50. Cowboys 7–3. **Drive: 12 plays, 73 yards, 5:59.**
- IND – Ashton Dulin 14-yard pass from Matt Ryan (Chase McLaughlin kick), 2:37. Colts 10–7. **Drive: 5 plays, 79 yard, 2:13.**

**Second quarter**

- DAL – Tony Pollard 2-yard run (Brett Maher kick), 10:16. Cowboys 14–10. **Drive: 6 plays, 56 yards, 2:58.**
- IND – Chase McLaughlin 34-yard field goal, 1:47. Cowboys 14–13. **Drive: 4 plays, 3 yard, 0:57.**
- DAL – Michael Gallup 13-yard pass from Dak Prescott (Brett Maher kick), 0:13. Cowboys 21–13. **Drive: 5 plays, 26 yards, 0:42.**

**Third quarter**

- IND – Alec Pierce 15-yard pass from Matt Ryan (pass failed), 3:43. Cowboys 21–19. **Drive: 15 plays, 90 yards, 8:00.**

**Fourth quarter**

- DAL – Michael Gallup 3-yard pass from Dak Prescott (Brett Maher kick), 13:52. Cowboys 28–19. **Drive: 10 plays, 75 yards, 4:51.**
- DAL – Malik Hooker 38-yard fumble return (pass failed), 13:34. Cowboys 34–19.
- DAL – Tony Pollard 30-yard run (kick blocked), 9:46. Cowboys 40–19. **Drive: 3 plays, 53 yards, 1:17.**
- DAL – Ezekiel Elliott 4-yard run (Brett Maher kick), 6:06. Cowboys 47–19. **Drive: 5 plays, 72 yards, 2:58.**
- DAL – Malik Davis 4-yard run (Brett Maher kick), 2:25. Cowboys 54–19. **Drive: 3 plays, 29 yards, 1:34.**

**Top passers**

- IND – Matt Ryan – 21/37, 233 yards, 2 TD, 3 INT
- DAL – Dak Prescott – 20/30, 170 yards, 3 TD, INT

**Top rushers**

- IND – Jonathan Taylor – 21 rushes, 82 yards
- DAL – Tony Pollard – 12 rushes, 91 yards, 2 TD

**Top receivers**

- IND – Alec Pierce – 4 receptions, 86 yards, TD
- DAL – CeeDee Lamb – 5 receptions, 71 yards, TD

The Cowboys 4th quarter performance tied for the 2nd most points scored in the 4th quarter by a single team.

==== Week 14: vs. Houston Texans ====
Week 14: Houston Texans at Dallas Cowboys – Game summary

| Quarter | 1 | 2 | 3 | 4 | Total |
|---|---|---|---|---|---|
| Texans | 10 | 10 | 3 | 0 | **23** |
| **Cowboys** | 7 | 10 | 0 | 10 | **27** |

at AT&T Stadium, Arlington, Texas

- Date: December 11
- Game time: 12:00 p.m. CST
- Game weather: None (retractable roof closed)
- Game attendance: 93,843
- Referee: John Hussey
- TV announcers (Fox): Kevin Kugler, Mark Sanchez and Laura Okmin
- Recap, Game Book

Game information

**First quarter**

- DAL – Tony Pollard 11-yard run (Brett Maher kick), 11:20. Cowboys 7–0. **Drive: 9 plays, 76 yards, 3:40.**
- HOU – Dameon Pierce 1-yard run (Kaʻimi Fairbairn kick), 5:33. Tied 7–7. **Drive: 6 plays, 24 yards, 3:28.**
- HOU – Kaʻimi Faribairn 43-yard field goal, 0:18. Texans 10–7. **Drive: 6 plays, 47 yards, 3:09.**

**Second quarter**

- DAL – Tony Pollard 10-yard pass from Dak Prescott (Brett Maher kick), 12:28. Cowboys 14–10. **Drive: 7 plays, 75 yards, 2:50.**
- HOU – Amari Rodgers 28-yard pass from Jeff Driskel (Kaʻimi Fairbairn kick), 2:23. Texans 17–14. **Drive: 2 plays, 27 yards, 0:49.**
- DAL – Brett Maher 33-yard field goal, 0:40. Tied 17–17. **Drive: 11 plays, 60 yards, 1:43.**
- HOU – Kaʻimi Fairbairn 50-yard field goal, 0:00. Texans 20–17. **Drive: 5 plays, 43 yards, 0:40.**

**Third quarter**

- HOU – Kaʻimi Fairbairn 54-yard field goal, 3:03. Texans 23–17. **Drive: 10 plays, 63 yards, 5:16.**

**Fourth quarter**

- DAL – Brett Maher 53-yard field goal, 14:50. Texans 23–20. **Drive: 9 plays, 40 yards, 3:13.**
- DAL – Ezekiel Elliott 2-yard run (Brett Maher kick), 0:41. Cowboys 27–23. **Drive: 11 plays, 98 yards, 2:39.**

**Top passers**

- HOU – Davis Mills – 16/21, 175 yards, INT
- DAL – Dak Prescott – 24/39, 284 yards, TD, 2 INT

**Top rushers**

- HOU – Dameon Pierce – 22 rushes, 78 yards, TD
- DAL – Ezekiel Elliott – 15 rushes, 62 yards, TD

**Top receivers**

- HOU – Chris Moore – 10 receptions, 124 yards
- DAL – Dalton Schultz – 6 receptions, 87 yards

The Cowboys stayed at home to take on the Houston Texans, whose lone win prior to Week 16 came against the Jacksonville Jaguars in Week 5. The Cowboys jumped to an opening touchdown drive from Tony Pollard to allow the Cowboys to take an early 7–0 lead. The Texans responded with a touchdown drive of their own to make it 7–7. The Cowboys trailed 10–7 after the first quarter, then regained the lead after Tony Pollard had another touchdown drive to make it 14–10 Cowboys. The Texans took the lead again after a touchdown drive from Jeff Driskel to Amari Rodgers. The two teams exchanged field goals before halftime, making the game 20–17 in favor of the Texans. In the third quarter, the Cowboys allowed the Texans to march down the field, but were able to hold Houston to a field goal. In the final quarter, the Cowboys trailed 23–20. In the final minutes of the game, the Cowboys forced a turnover on downs on 4th-and-goal on the 3-yard line via a combined tackle made by Neville Gallimore and Anthony Barr to get the ball back to get another chance to avoid embarrassment. The Cowboys moved into the red zone of Houston territory prior to the two-minute warning, and put the Cowboys in position to take a late lead. Dallas did so via an Ezekiel Elliott 2-yard rushing touchdown to give the Cowboys a 27–23 lead with 41 seconds left in the game. The Texans tried to respond, but Cowboys' cornerback Israel Mukuamu, who substituted for injured Anthony Brown, intercepted a Hail Mary pass to seal the Cowboys' win. The win improved the Cowboys to 10–3, giving Dallas back-to-back 10+ win seasons for the first time since 1995–1996.

==== Week 15: at Jacksonville Jaguars ====
Week 15: Dallas Cowboys at Jacksonville Jaguars – Game summary

| Quarter | 1 | 2 | 3 | 4 | OT | Total |
|---|---|---|---|---|---|---|
| Cowboys | 7 | 14 | 6 | 7 | 0 | **34** |
| **Jaguars** | 0 | 7 | 17 | 10 | 6 | **40** |

at TIAA Bank Field, Jacksonville, Florida

- Date: December 18
- Game time: 1:00 p.m. EST/12:00 p.m. CST
- Game weather: Sunny, 51 °F (11 °C)
- Game attendance: 69,050
- Referee: Shawn Smith
- TV announcers (Fox): Kevin Burkhardt, Greg Olsen and Erin Andrews
- Recap, Game Book

Game information

**First quarter**

- DAL – Ezekiel Elliott 10-yard run (Brett Maher kick), 4:31. Cowboys 7–0. **Drive: 6 plays, 41 yards, 2:54.**

**Second quarter**

- DAL – Peyton Hendershot 20-yard pass from Dak Prescott (Brett Maher kick), 13:01. Cowboys 14–0. **Drive: 10 plays, 86 yards, 4:50.**
- JAX – Zay Jones 5-yard pass from Trevor Lawrence (Riley Patterson kick), 7:45. Cowboys 14–7. **Drive: 9 plays, 75 yards, 5:16.**
- DAL – Noah Brown 1-yard pass from Dak Prescott (Brett Maher kick), 1:55. Cowboys 21–7. **Drive: 11 plays, 66 yards, 5:50.**

**Third quarter**

- JAX – Riley Patterson 33-yard field goal, 10:35. Cowboys 21–10. **Drive: 10 plays, 61 yards, 4:25.**
- DAL – Brett Maher 24-yard field goal, 7:36. Cowboys 24–10. **Drive: 8 plays, 69 yards, 2:59.**
- DAL – Brett Maher 53-yard field goal, 5:21. Cowboys 27–10. **Drive: 4 plays, 7 yards, 1:06.**
- JAX – Zay Jones 59-yard pass from Trevor Lawrence (Riley Patterson kick), 3:57. Cowboys 27–17. **Drive: 3 plays, 75 yards, 1:24.**
- JAX – Marvin Jones 10-yard pass from Trevor Lawrence (Riley Patterson kick), 1:23. Cowboys 27–24. **Drive: 4 plays, 39 yards, 1:30.**

**Fourth quarter**

- JAX – Zay Jones 3-yard pass from Trevor Lawrence (Riley Patterson kick), 10:03. Jaguars 31–27. **Drive: 8 plays, 75 yards, 4:14.**
- DAL – Noah Brown 13-yard pass from Dak Prescott (Brett Maher kick), 3:02. Cowboys 34–31. **Drive: 13 plays, 75 yards, 7:01.**
- JAX – Riley Patterson 48-yard field goal, 0:00. Tied 34–34. **Drive: 7 plays, 41 yards, 1:01.**

**Overtime**

- JAX – Rayshawn Jenkins 52–yard interception return, 6:52. Jaguars 40–34.

**Top passers**

- DAL – Dak Prescott – 23/30, 256 yards, 3 TD, 2 INT
- JAX – Trevor Lawrence – 27/42, 321 yards, 4 TD, INT

**Top rushers**

- DAL – Tony Pollard – 19 rushes, 75 yards
- JAX – Travis Etienne – 19 rushes, 103 yards

**Top receivers**

- DAL – CeeDee Lamb – 7 receptions, 126 yards
- JAX – Zay Jones – 6 receptions, 109 yards, 3 TD

The Cowboys traveled to Jacksonville for the first time since 2006. The Cowboys blew a 27–10 lead and lost to Trevor Lawrence and the Jaguars, 40-34 in overtime, on a 52-yard pick-six by Rayshawn Jenkins. With the upset loss, the Cowboys fell to 10–4, and 0–2 all time in the city of Jacksonville. Fortunately for Dallas, they still clinched their second consecutive playoff berth thanks to the Washington Commanders' loss to the New York Giants later that night.

==== Week 16: vs. Philadelphia Eagles ====
Week 16: Philadelphia Eagles at Dallas Cowboys – Game summary

| Quarter | 1 | 2 | 3 | 4 | Total |
|---|---|---|---|---|---|
| Eagles | 10 | 10 | 7 | 7 | **34** |
| **Cowboys** | 7 | 10 | 10 | 13 | **40** |

at AT&T Stadium, Arlington, Texas

- Date: December 24
- Game time: 3:25 p.m. CST
- Game weather: None (retractable roof closed)
- Game attendance: 93,754
- Referee: Alex Kemp
- TV announcers (Fox): Kevin Burkhardt, Greg Olsen and Erin Andrews
- Recap, Game Book

Game information

**First quarter**

- PHI – Jake Elliott 25-yard field goal, 11:16. Eagles 3–0. **Drive: 7 plays, 68 yards, 3:44.**
- PHI – Josh Sweat 42-yard interception return (Jake Elliott kick), 9:18. Eagles 10–0.
- DAL – Ezekiel Elliott 1-yard run (Brett Maher kick), 1:52. Eagles 10–7. **Drive: 14 plays, 75 yards, 7:26.**

**Second quarter**

- DAL – CeeDee Lamb 36-yard pass from Dak Prescott (Brett Maher kick), 11:34. Cowboys 14–10. **Drive: 6 plays, 47 yards, 3:18.**
- PHI – Gardner Minshew 1-yard run (Jake Elliott kick), 7:08. Eagles 17–14. **Drive: 10 play, 74 yards, 4:26.**
- DAL – Brett Maher 21-yard field goal, 1:49. Tied 17–17. **Drive: 13 plays, 72 yards, 5:19.**
- PHI – Jake Elliott 47-yard field goal, 0:06. Eagles 20–17. **Drive: 10 plays, 46 yards, 1:43.**

**Third quarter**

- PHI – DeVonta Smith 14-yard pass from Gardner Minshew (Jake Elliott kick), 9:00. Eagles 27–17. **Drive: 10 plays, 77 yards, 4:37.**
- DAL – Brett Maher 44-yard field goal, 5:01. Eagles 27–20. **Drive: 9 plays, 49 yards, 3:59.**
- DAL – Michael Gallup 12-yard pass from Dak Prescott (Brett Maher kick), 2:12. Tied 27–27. **Drive: 5 plays, 31 yards, 1:59.**

**Fourth quarter**

- PHI – DeVonta Smith 9-yard pass from Gardner Minshew (Jake Elliott kick), 9:59. Eagles 34–27. **Drive: 13 plays, 75 yards, 7:13.**
- DAL – CeeDee Lamb 7-yard pass from Dak Prescott (Brett Maher kick), 5:49. Tied 34–34. **Drive: 8 plays, 75 yards, 4:10.**
- DAL – Brett Maher 48-yard field goal, 2:19. Cowboys 37–34. **Drive: 6 plays, 31 yards, 2:00.**
- DAL – Brett Maher 26-yard field goal, 1:41. Cowboys 40–34. **Drive: 5 plays, 13 yards, 0:26.**

**Top passers**

- PHI – Gardner Minshew – 24/40, 355 yards, 2 TD, 2 INT
- DAL – Dak Prescott – 27/35, 347 yards, 3 TD, INT

**Top rushers**

- PHI – Miles Sanders – 21 rushes, 65 yards
- DAL – Ezekiel Elliott – 16 rushes, 55 yards, TD

**Top receivers**

- PHI – DeVonta Smith – 8 receptions, 113 yards, 2 TD
- DAL – CeeDee Lamb – 10 receptions, 120 yards, 2 TD

The Cowboys returned home to face the league-leading Philadelphia Eagles, seeking to keep their hopes of repeating as NFC East champions alive. On Dallas' first drive, Dak Prescott set the longest interception streak of his career, after Eagles' Josh Sweat intercepted him, and returned that same interception for a touchdown, putting Dallas in an early 10–0 hole. Despite this early deficit, and facing a deficit for most of the game, the Cowboys responded in dominant fashion, torching Philadelphia's high-ranked defense for over 400 total yards. Prescott rebounded from the pick six with his best game of the season, throwing for 347 yards and three touchdowns, including two to CeeDee Lamb, who finished with 120 yards receiving. The defense contributed to Dallas' comeback as well, forcing four turnovers that led to 20 points for the Cowboys, helping them keep pace with the Eagles, and eventually putting Dallas in the lead for good. With the 40–34 win, Dallas improved to 11–4 on the season and kept their division title hopes alive, while simultaneously denying Philadelphia a chance to finish with a perfect away record. The victory, coincidentally, was a reversal of the Cowboys' loss to Jacksonville the prior week, with the final score being 40–34 with the winner erasing a deficit of 10 or more points. The Cowboys' win also marked their fifth straight home win over their rivals and their eighth straight home win in 2022 after the Week 1 loss to Tampa Bay.

==== Week 17: at Tennessee Titans ====
Week 17: Dallas Cowboys at Tennessee Titans – Game summary

| Quarter | 1 | 2 | 3 | 4 | Total |
|---|---|---|---|---|---|
| **Cowboys** | 7 | 3 | 7 | 10 | **27** |
| Titans | 0 | 6 | 7 | 0 | **13** |

at Nissan Stadium, Nashville, Tennessee

- Date: December 29
- Game time: 7:15 p.m. CST
- Game weather: Rain, 59 °F (15 °C)
- Game attendance: 69,292
- Referee: Shawn Hochuli
- TV announcers (KDFW/Prime Video): Al Michaels, Kirk Herbstreit and Kaylee Hartung
- Recap, Game Book

Game information

**First quarter**

- DAL – Ezekiel Elliott 1-yard run (Brett Maher kick), 4:36. Cowboys 7–0. **Drive: 10 plays, 60 yards, 5:30.**

**Second quarter**

- DAL – Brett Maher 36-yard field goal, 14:56. Cowboys 10–0. **Drive: 8 plays, 47 yards, 3:41.**
- TEN – Randy Bullock 37-yard field goal, 1:04. Cowboys 10–3. **Drive: 8 plays, 45 yards, 2:29.**
- TEN – Randy Bullock 29-yard field goal, 0:00. Cowboys 10–6. **Drive: 2 plays, 30 yards, 0:13.**

**Third quarter**

- DAL – Dalton Schultz 6-yard pass from Dak Prescott (Brett Maher kick), 8:48. Cowboys 17–6. **Drive: 10 plays, 89 yards, 4:35.**
- TEN – Robert Woods 7-yard pass from Joshua Dobbs (Randy Bullock kick), 2:04. Cowboys 17–13. **Drive: 14 plays, 71 yards, 6:44.**

**Fourth quarter**

- DAL – Dalton Schultz 10-yard pass from Dak Prescott (Brett Maher kick), 11:58. Cowboys 24–13. **Drive: 10 plays, 75 yards, 5:06.**
- DAL – Brett Maher 45-yard field goal, 6:24. Cowboys 27–13. **Drive: 7 plays, 53 yards, 3:26.**

**Top passers**

- DAL – Dak Prescott – 29/41, 282 yards, 2 TD, 2 INT
- TEN – Joshua Dobbs – 20/39, 232 yards, TD, INT

**Top rushers**

- DAL – Malik Davis – 10 rushes, 39 yards
- TEN – Hassan Haskins – 12 rushes, 40 yards

**Top receivers**

- DAL – CeeDee Lamb – 11 receptions, 100 yards
- TEN – Treylon Burks – 4 receptions, 66 yards

Despite a first half funk, the Cowboys defense held the Titans offense to 13 points. Tennessee was already without starting quarterback Ryan Tannehill for the season due to injury. As the interception streak went on for Dak Prescott, the Cowboys stayed afloat after another solid second half. The Cowboys improved to 12–4, and sent the Titans to their first losing season in seven years.

==== Week 18: at Washington Commanders ====
Week 18: Dallas Cowboys at Washington Commanders – Game summary

| Quarter | 1 | 2 | 3 | 4 | Total |
|---|---|---|---|---|---|
| Cowboys | 0 | 6 | 0 | 0 | **6** |
| **Commanders** | 7 | 6 | 7 | 6 | **26** |

at FedExField, Landover, Maryland

- Date: January 8
- Game time: 4:25 p.m. EST/3:25 p.m. CST
- Game weather: Cloudy, 42 °F (6 °C)
- Game attendance: 62,814
- Referee: Tra Blake
- TV announcers (Fox): Kevin Burkhardt, Greg Olsen, Erin Andrews and Tom Rinaldi
- Recap, Game Book

Game information

**First quarter**

- WAS – Terry McLaurin 16-yard pass from Sam Howell (Joey Slye kick), 11:08. Commanders 7–0. **Drive: 2 plays, 20 yards, 0:37.**

**Second quarter**

- WAS – Kendall Fuller 29-yard interception return (kick failed), 12:38. Commanders 13–0.
- DAL – CeeDee Lamb 15-yard pass from Dak Prescott (kick failed), 0:06. Commanders 13–6. **Drive: 14 plays, 77 yards, 2:31.**

**Third quarter**

- WAS – Sam Howell 9-yard run (Joey Slye kick), 1:49. Commanders 20–6. **Drive: 6 plays, 59 yards, 3:45.**

**Fourth quarter**

- WAS – Joey Slye 29-yard field goal, 14:19. Commanders 23–6. **Drive: 5 plays, 56 yards, 1:25.**
- WAS – Joey Slye 22-yard field goal, 5:19. Commanders 26–6. **Drive: 6 plays, 41 yards, 3:30.**

**Top passers**

- DAL – Dak Prescott – 14/37, 128 yards, TD, INT
- WAS – Sam Howell – 11/19, 169 yards, TD, INT

**Top rushers**

- DAL – Tony Pollard – 7 rushes, 19 yards
- WAS – Jaret Patterson – 17 rushes, 78 yards

**Top receivers**

- DAL – CeeDee Lamb – 5 receptions, 52 yards, TD
- WAS – Terry McLaurin – 3 receptions, 74 yards, TD

Heading into the game, the Cowboys would have clinched the NFC East with a win and an Eagles loss against the Giants. However, the Cowboys came out flat and were blown out by the Commanders. Dallas was held to a season-low 182 yards and 2.8 yards per play, and Dak Prescott completed under 40% of his passes while throwing another pick-six. The Eagles ended up beating the Giants, preventing the Cowboys from winning the NFC East regardless; the Cowboys finished with a 12–5 record for the second consecutive season and would face the Buccaneers in the wild card round.

=== Standings ===
==== Division ====
NFC East
| | W | L | T | PCT | DIV | CONF | PF | PA | STK |
|---|---|---|---|---|---|---|---|---|---|
| ^{(1)} Philadelphia Eagles | 14 | 3 | 0 | .824 | 4–2 | 9–3 | 477 | 344 | W1 |
| ^{(5)} Dallas Cowboys | 12 | 5 | 0 | .706 | 4–2 | 8–4 | 467 | 342 | L1 |
| ^{(6)} New York Giants | 9 | 7 | 1 | .559 | 1–4–1 | 4–7–1 | 365 | 371 | L1 |
| Washington Commanders | 8 | 8 | 1 | .500 | 2–3–1 | 5–6–1 | 321 | 343 | W1 |

==== Conference ====
NFC
| # | Team | Division | W | L | T | PCT | DIV | CONF | SOS | SOV | STK |
|---|---|---|---|---|---|---|---|---|---|---|---|
**Division leaders**
| 1 | Philadelphia Eagles | East | 14 | 3 | 0 | .824 | 4–2 | 9–3 | .474 | .460 | W1 |
| 2 (Note: San Francisco claimed the No. 2 seed over Minnesota based on conference record (10–2 vs. 8–4).) | San Francisco 49ers | West | 13 | 4 | 0 | .765 | 6–0 | 10–2 | .417 | .414 | W10 |
| 3 | Minnesota Vikings | North | 13 | 4 | 0 | .765 | 4–2 | 8–4 | .474 | .425 | W1 |
| 4 | Tampa Bay Buccaneers | South | 8 | 9 | 0 | .471 | 4–2 | 8–4 | .503 | .426 | L1 |
**Wild cards**
| 5 | Dallas Cowboys | East | 12 | 5 | 0 | .706 | 4–2 | 8–4 | .507 | .485 | L1 |
| 6 | New York Giants | East | 9 | 7 | 1 | .559 | 1–4–1 | 4–7–1 | .526 | .395 | L1 |
| 7 (Note: Seattle finished ahead of Detroit based on head-to-head victory, claiming the 7th and final playoff spot.) | Seattle Seahawks | West | 9 | 8 | 0 | .529 | 4–2 | 6–6 | .462 | .382 | W2 |
**Did not qualify for the postseason**
| 8 | Detroit Lions | North | 9 | 8 | 0 | .529 | 5–1 | 7–5 | .535 | .451 | W2 |
| 9 | Washington Commanders | East | 8 | 8 | 1 | .500 | 2–3–1 | 5–6–1 | .536 | .449 | W1 |
| 10 | Green Bay Packers | North | 8 | 9 | 0 | .471 | 3–3 | 6–6 | .524 | .449 | L1 |
| 11 (Note: Carolina finished ahead of New Orleans and Atlanta based on head-to-head record (3–1 vs. 2–2/1–3).) | Carolina Panthers | South | 7 | 10 | 0 | .412 | 4–2 | 6–6 | .474 | .437 | W1 |
| 12 (Note: New Orleans finished ahead of Atlanta based on head-to-head sweep.) | New Orleans Saints | South | 7 | 10 | 0 | .412 | 2–4 | 5–7 | .507 | .462 | L1 |
| 13 | Atlanta Falcons | South | 7 | 10 | 0 | .412 | 2–4 | 6–6 | .467 | .429 | W2 |
| 14 | Los Angeles Rams | West | 5 | 12 | 0 | .294 | 1–5 | 3–9 | .517 | .341 | L2 |
| 15 | Arizona Cardinals | West | 4 | 13 | 0 | .235 | 1–5 | 3–9 | .529 | .368 | L7 |
| 16 | Chicago Bears | North | 3 | 14 | 0 | .176 | 0–6 | 1–11 | .571 | .480 | L10 |
**Tiebreakers** (Note: When breaking ties for three or more teams under the NFL's rules, they are first broken within divisions, then comparing only the highest-ranked remaining team from each division.)

== Postseason ==
=== Schedule ===
| Round | Date | Opponent (seed) | Result | Record | Venue | Recap |
|---|---|---|---|---|---|---|
| Wild Card | January 16 | at Tampa Bay Buccaneers (4) | W 31–14 | 1–0 | Raymond James Stadium | Recap |
| Divisional | January 22 | at San Francisco 49ers (2) | L 12–19 | 1–1 | Levi's Stadium | Recap |

=== Game summaries ===
==== NFC Wild Card Playoffs: at (4) Tampa Bay Buccaneers ====
NFC Wild Card Playoffs: (5) Dallas Cowboys at (4) Tampa Bay Buccaneers – Game summary

| Quarter | 1 | 2 | 3 | 4 | Total |
|---|---|---|---|---|---|
| Cowboys | 6 | 12 | 6 | 7 | 31 |
| Buccaneers | 0 | 0 | 6 | 8 | 14 |

at Raymond James Stadium, Tampa, Florida

- Date: January 16, 2023
- Game time: 8:15 p.m. EST/7:15 p.m. CST
- Game weather: Clear, 56 °F (13 °C)
- Game attendance: 69,145
- Referee: Craig Wrolstad
- TV announcers (ABC/ESPN): Joe Buck, Troy Aikman, and Lisa Salters
- Recap, Game Book

Game information

First quarter

- DAL – Dalton Schultz 22-yard pass from Dak Prescott (kick failed, wide right), 6:28. Cowboys 6–0. Drive: 7 plays, 80 yards, 3:32.

Second quarter

- DAL – Dak Prescott 1-yard rush (kick failed, wide right), 6:13. Cowboys 12–0. Drive: 15 plays, 80 yards, 8:38.
- DAL – Dalton Schultz 11-yard pass from Dak Prescott (kick failed, wide left), 0:27. Cowboys 18–0. Drive: 11 plays, 91 yards, 3:05.

Third quarter

- DAL – Michael Gallup 2-yard pass from Dak Prescott (kick failed, hit right upright), 10:04. Cowboys 24–0. Drive: 8 plays, 86 yards, 4:07.
- TB – Julio Jones 30-yard pass from Tom Brady (pass failed), 0:00. Cowboys 24–6. Drive: 10 plays, 95 yards, 3:09.

Fourth quarter

- DAL – CeeDee Lamb 18-yard pass from Dak Prescott (Brett Maher kick), 10:13. Cowboys 31–6. Drive: 9 plays, 66 yards, 4:47.
- TB – Cameron Brate 8-yard pass from Tom Brady (Tom Brady-Mike Evans pass), 2:04. Cowboys 31–14. Drive: 11 plays, 52 yards, 2:39.

Top passers

- DAL – Dak Prescott – 25/33, 305 yards, 4 TD
- TB – Tom Brady – 35/66, 351 yards, 2 TD, 1 INT

Top rushers

- DAL – Tony Pollard – 15 rushes, 77 yards
- TB – Rachaad White – 7 rushes, 41 yards

Top receivers

- DAL – Dalton Schultz – 7 receptions, 95 yards, 2 TD
- TB – Chris Godwin – 10 receptions, 85 yards

The matchup with the Buccaneers saw the Cowboys buck a negative history trend, as the Cowboys won their first road playoff game since 1992, as well as improving to 1–7 against Tom Brady-led teams. It also marked Dallas' first playoff win in their navy blue jerseys since the 1978 season, when they shut out the Los Angeles Rams in the NFC Championship game.

Kicker Brett Maher notably missed 4 extra points, the most ever in an NFL game.

==== NFC Divisional Playoffs: at (2) San Francisco 49ers ====
NFC Divisional Playoffs: (5) Dallas Cowboys at (2) San Francisco 49ers;– Game summary

| Quarter | 1 | 2 | 3 | 4 | Total |
|---|---|---|---|---|---|
| Cowboys | 0 | 6 | 3 | 3 | 12 |
| 49ers | 3 | 6 | 0 | 10 | 19 |

at Levi's Stadium, Santa Clara, California

- Date: January 22, 2023
- Game time: 3:40 p.m. PST/5:40 p.m. CST
- Game weather: Clear, 59 °F (15 °C)
- Game attendance: 71,888
- Referee: Bill Vinovich
- TV announcers (Fox): Kevin Burkhardt, Greg Olsen, Erin Andrews, and Tom Rinaldi
- Recap, Game Book

Game information

First quarter

- SF – Robbie Gould 26-yard field goal, 2:12. 49ers 3–0. Drive: 7 plays, 13 yards, 3:37.

Second quarter

- DAL – Dalton Schultz 3-yard pass from Dak Prescott (kick blocked), 9:25. Cowboys 6–3. Drive: 14 plays, 74 yards, 7:47.
- SF – Robbie Gould 47-yard field goal, 3:43. Tied 6–6. Drive: 10 plays, 46 yards, 5:42.
- SF – Robbie Gould 50-yard field goal, 0:00. 49ers 9–6. Drive: 8 plays, 40 yards, 1:15.

Third quarter

- DAL – Brett Maher 25-yard field goal, 9:08. Tied 9–9. Drive: 6 plays, 14 yards, 2:33.

Fourth quarter

- SF – Christian McCaffrey 2-yard rush (Robbie Gould kick), 14:58. 49ers 16–9. Drive: 10 plays, 91 yards, 6:00.
- DAL – Brett Maher 43-yard field goal, 11:03. 49ers 16–12. Drive: 8 plays, 32 yards, 3:55.

Top passers

- DAL – Dak Prescott – 23/37, 206 yards, 1 TD, 2 INT
- SF – Brock Purdy – 19/29, 214 yards

Top rushers

- DAL – Ezekiel Elliott – 10 rushes, 26 yards
- SF – Elijah Mitchell – 14 rushes, 51 yards

Top receivers

- DAL – CeeDee Lamb – 10 receptions, 117 yards
- SF – George Kittle – 5 receptions, 95 yards

Down 19–12 (which would end up being the final score) in the final six seconds of the game, on their 24-yard line, Dak Prescott tried to rally the Cowboys, but he couldn't finish, despite Ezekiel Elliott's valiant attempt at playing center. With the loss, the Cowboys ended their season at 13-6.
