= Quandre =

Quandre is a given name. Notable people with the name include:

- Quandre Diggs, American football player
- Quandre Mosely, American football player
