= Sam Williams (defensive end, born 1999) =

American football player (born 1999)

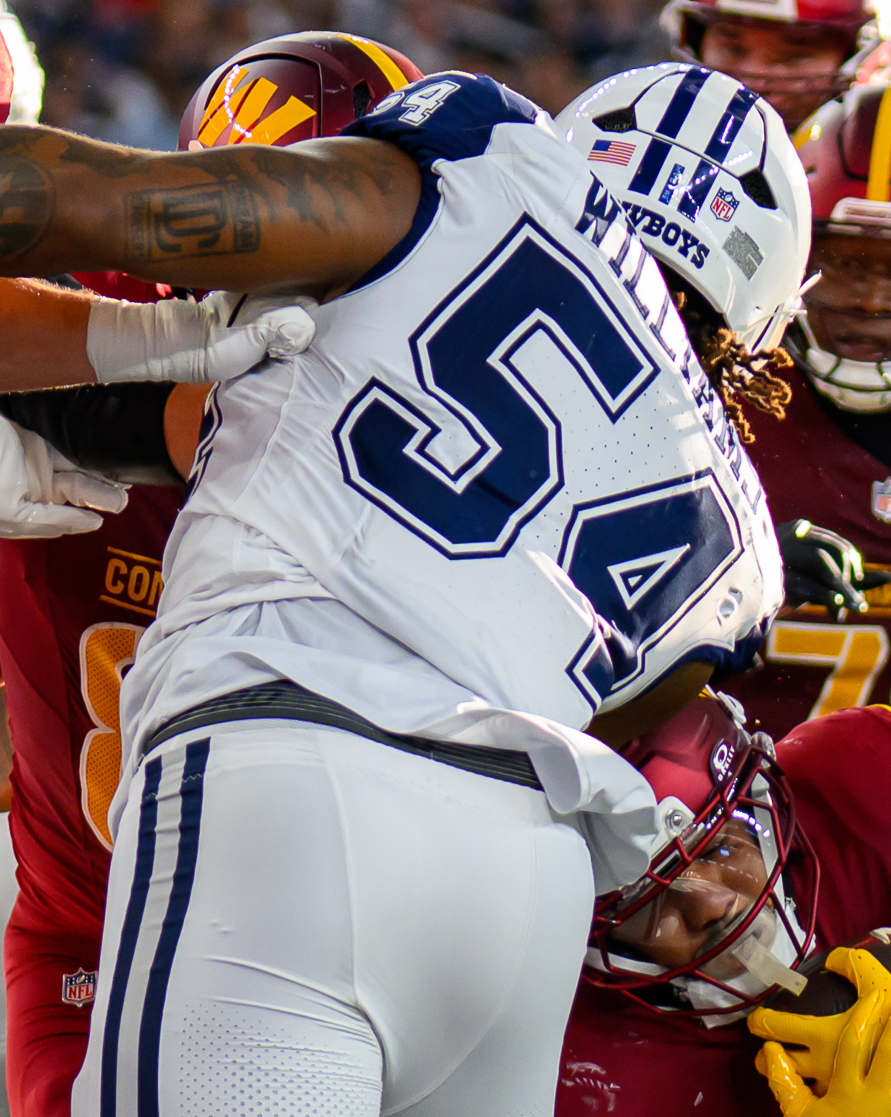
- Williams with the Dallas Cowboys in 2025

No. 54 – Cleveland Browns
- Position: Defensive end
- Roster status: Active

Personal information
- Born: March 31, 1999 (age 27); Mobile, Alabama, U.S.
- Listed height: 6 ft 4 in (1.93 m)
- Listed weight: 260 lb (118 kg)

Career information
- High school: Robert E. Lee (Montgomery, Alabama)
- College: Northeast Mississippi CC (2017–2018); Ole Miss (2019–2021)
- NFL draft: 2022: 2nd round, 56th overall pick

Career history
- Dallas Cowboys (2022–2025); Cleveland Browns (2026–present)

Awards and highlights
- Third-team All-American (2021); First-team All-SEC (2021)

Career NFL statistics as of Week 7, 2026
- Total tackles: 105
- Sacks: 10.5
- Forced fumbles: 3
- Fumble recoveries: 4
- Pass deflections: 4
- Stats at Pro Football Reference

Samuel Degarrick Williams (born March 31, 1999) is an American professional football defensive end for the Cleveland Browns in the National Football League (NFL). He played college football for the Northeast Mississippi Tigers before transferring to the Ole Miss Rebels.

== Early life ==
Williams had a difficult childhood; he and his siblings were taken from their mother and raised by his grandparents and later by an aunt after the age of 7. He attended Marbury High School, a small school in Deatsville, Alabama. His sport of choice at Marbury was basketball, before being expelled the summer after his junior season for playing with a knife.

He transferred to Robert E. Lee High School in Montgomery, Alabama. He played his only full year of high school football as a starter at defensive line and was teammates with future pro football player Henry Ruggs III.

== College career ==
Williams enrolled at Northeast Mississippi Community College. As a freshman in 2017, he appeared 9 games and collecting 53 tackles (11 for loss), 3.5 sacks, and 2 forced fumbles.

As a sophomore in 2018, he appeared in 9 games, registering 75 tackles (28.5 for loss), 17.5 sacks (tied for the most in the nation's junior colleges), 4 forced fumbles and 4 pass breakups. He received first-team NJCAA All-American and MACJC Defensive Lineman of the Year honors.

Williams transferred to the University of Mississippi (Ole Miss). As a junior in 2019, he started 8 of 12 games, totaling 37 tackles, 6 sacks (led the team), 9.5 tackles for loss, 5 quarterback pressures, one interception, one pass breakup and one forced fumble.

As a senior in 2020, he was suspended in late July and August after being arrested for felony sexual battery, although the chargers were dropped. He started six of 10 games, splitting time between linebacker and defensive end. He recorded 39 tackles, 4 sacks, 8 tackles for loss (led the team), 3 quarterback pressures and one forced fumble.

During his final season in 2021, granted due to his transfer, he broke the school's single-season sack record with 12.5, while compiling 13 starts, 57 tackles, 16 for loss (led the team), 8 quarterback pressures, 4 forced fumbles (ranked 10th in the nation), one fumble returned for a 33 yard touchdown and one pass breakup.

== Professional career ==
Pre-draft measurables
Height	Weight	Arm length	Hand span	Wingspan	40-yard dash	10-yard split	20-yard split	20-yard shuttle	Three-cone drill	Vertical jump	Broad jump	Bench press
6 ft 3 5/8 in (1.92 m)	261 lb (118 kg)	33 1/8 in (0.84 m)	9 7/8 in (0.25 m)	6 ft 8 1/4 in (2.04 m)	4.46 s	1.55 s	2.57 s	4.34 s	7.03 s	36.0 in (0.91 m)	10 ft 3 in (3.12 m)	25 reps
All values from NFL Combine/Pro Day

=== Dallas Cowboys ===
Williams was selected by the Dallas Cowboys with the 56th overall pick in the second round of the 2022 NFL draft. Against the Detroit Lions, he had 3 tackles, 2 sacks, one forced fumble and one fumble recovery in only 12 snaps. He was declared inactive with a knee injury in Week 8 against the Chicago Bears. He missed Week 16 against the Philadelphia Eagles after he was involved in a car accident in Plano, Texas. He appeared in 15 games, making 19 tackles, 7 tackles for loss (led the team), 4 sacks, 20 quarterback pressures, one forced fumble and tied a team-high with 3 fumble recoveries.

In 2023, he appeared in 17 games as a backup defensive end, collecting 20 tackles (2 for loss), 4.5 sacks (third on the team), 17 quarterback pressures, 4 special teams tackles and one blocked punt. Against the Los Angeles Rams, he had his first career blocked punt in the second quarter that resulted in a safety. He had a sack in three consecutive games against the Philadelphia Eagles (11/5), New York Giants (11/12) and Carolina Panthers (11/19).

In 2024, he was expected to have a bigger role on the defense, after the departures in free agency of Dorance Armstrong and Dante Fowler. On July 28, 2024, Williams suffered a torn ACL in training camp, as well as a partial tear of his MCL. On August 7, 2024, he was placed on the injured reserve list.

On March 11, 2026, Williams re-signed with the Cowboys on a one-year contract. On August 30, he was released by the Cowboys as a part of final roster cuts.

=== Cleveland Browns ===
On September 1, 2026, Williams signed with the Cleveland Browns.

== NFL career statistics ==
Legend
	Led the league
**Bold**	Career high

=== Regular season ===
Year	Team	Games		Tackles						Fumbles				Interceptions			
Year	Team	GP	GS	Cmb	Solo	Ast	Sck	TFL	Sfty	FF	FR	Yds	TD	Int	Yds	TD	PD
2022	DAL	15	0	22	15	7	4.0	**10**	0	**1**	**3**	0	0	0	0	0	1
2023	DAL	17	0	26	15	11	**4.5**	5	**1**	**1**	0	0	0	0	0	0	0
2025	DAL	17	5	**37**	**23**	**14**	1.0	7	0	**1**	1	0	0	0	0	0	**2**
2026	CLE	9	0	24	11	13	1	0	0	0	0	0	0	0	0	0	2
Career		58	5	109	64	45	10.5	22	1	3	4	0	0	0	0	0	5

=== Postseason ===
Year	Team	Games		Tackles						Fumbles				Interceptions			
Year	Team	GP	GS	Cmb	Solo	Ast	Sck	TFL	Sfty	FF	FR	Yds	TD	Int	Yds	TD	PD
2022	DAL	2	0	0	0	0	0.0	0	0	0	0	0	0	0	0	0	0
2023	DAL	1	0	0	0	0	0.0	0	0	0	0	0	0	0	0	0	0
Career		3	0	0	0	0	0.0	0	0	0	0	0	0	0	0	0	0
