= Markquese Bell =

American football player (born 1999)

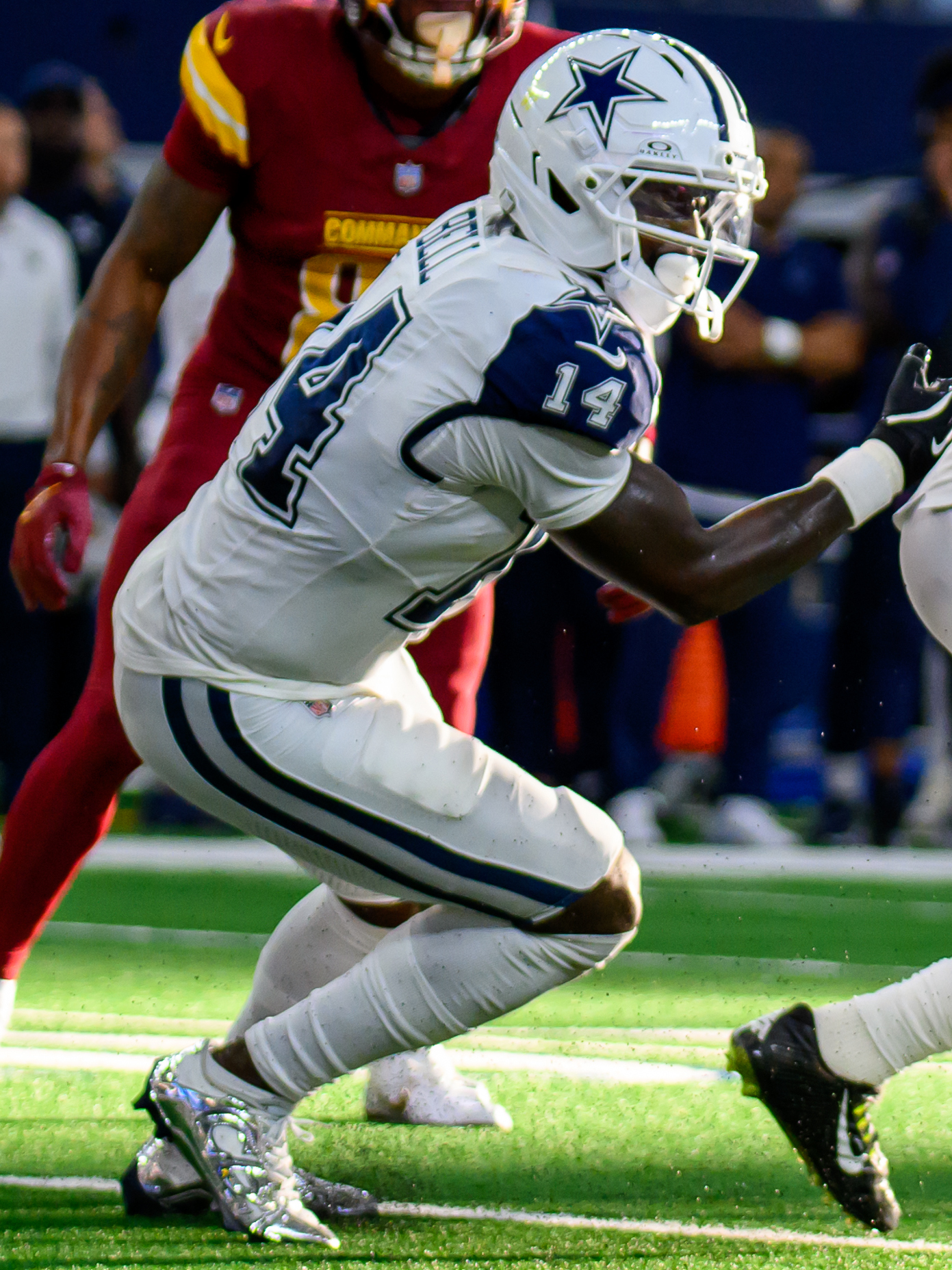
- Bell with the Dallas Cowboys in 2025

No. 14 – Dallas Cowboys
- Position: Safety
- Roster status: Active

Personal information
- Born: January 6, 1999 (age 27); Bridgeton, New Jersey, U.S.
- Listed height: 6 ft 2 in (1.88 m)
- Listed weight: 215 lb (98 kg)

Career information
- High school: Bridgeton
- College: Coffeyville CC (2018); Florida A&M (2019–2021)
- NFL draft: 2022: undrafted

Career history
- Dallas Cowboys (2022–present)

Awards and highlights
- Black College Football Pro Player of the Year Award (2024); First-team All-MEAC (2019); First-team All-SWAC (2021); FCS first-team All-American (2021)

Career NFL statistics as of Week 5, 2026
- Total tackles: 160
- Pass deflections: 8
- Interceptions: 1
- Forced fumbles: 3
- Stats at Pro Football Reference

Markquese Bell (born January 6, 1999) is an American professional football safety for the Dallas Cowboys of the National Football League (NFL). He played college football for the Florida A&M Rattlers.

== Early life ==
Bell grew up in Bridgeton, New Jersey and attended Bridgeton High School. As a senior, he was the starter at quarterback and defensive back, tallying 885 rushing yards, 7 touchdowns, 76 tackles, 2 interceptions, 3 pass breakups and one forced fumble. He was a two-time second-team all-state selection and the 2015 South Jersey Times Offensive Player of the Year.

He was rated a four-star recruit and committed to play college football at Maryland over offers from Ohio State, Rutgers, and Virginia.

== College career ==
Bell accepted a football scholarship from the University of Maryland. He was suspended entering his freshman season due to a violation of the team's code of conduct. He was ultimately expelled from the school before ever playing in a game for the Terrapins.

He transferred to Coffeyville Community College for the 2018 season and made 52 tackles with two interceptions. After the season, Bell transferred to Florida A&M University.

As a sophomore in 2019, he started 11 games at safety, posting 61 tackles (5 for loss), 5 interceptions (tied for the conference lead), 9 pass breakups and 2 forced fumbles.

In 2020, he was not able to play, as the school opted to cancel its football games due to the COVID-19 pandemic.

As a senior in 2021, he started 12 games, registering 95 tackles (led the team), 6.5 tackles for loss, 2 sacks, one interception, one pass breakup and 5 forced fumbles. He had 15 tackles (one for loss), one sack, and one forced fumble against the University of South Florida.

=== College statistics ===
Legend
**Bold**	Career high

Season	Team	GP	Solo	Ast	Tot	Int	Avg	Yds	TD	PD	FF	FR
2019	Florida A&M	11	39	**24**	63	**4**	**9.7**	**39**	0	-	0	0
2020	Florida A&M	Season cancelled due to the COVID-19 pandemic										
2021	Florida A&M	**12**	**71**	**24**	**95**	1	0.0	0	0	-	0	0
Total		23	110	48	158	5	4.8	39	0	-	0	0

== Professional career ==
Pre-draft measurables
Height	Weight	Arm length	Hand span	Wingspan	40-yard dash	10-yard split	20-yard split	20-yard shuttle	Three-cone drill	Vertical jump	Broad jump
6 ft 2 1/8 in (1.88 m)	212 lb (96 kg)	32 3/8 in (0.82 m)	9 3/8 in (0.24 m)	6 ft 4 1/8 in (1.93 m)	4.41 s	1.51 s	2.56 s	4.37 s	7.25 s	36.5 in (0.93 m)	10 ft 3 in (3.12 m)
All values from NFL Combine/Pro Day

Bell was signed as an undrafted free agent by the Dallas Cowboys after the 2022 NFL draft on May 1. He was declared inactive in 12 games. He appeared in 5 games as a backup and compiled one tackle on defense.

In 2023, after rookie DeMarvion Overshown suffered a season-ending injury, Bell passed Devin Harper on the depth chart for the strongside linebacker job. By the end of the season, the effectiveness of camouflaging safeties as hybrid linebackers eventually caught up with the Cowboys and the team was exposed defending the run game. Bell appeared in 17 games with 8 starts, registering 103 tackles (second on the team), 3 tackles for loss and 4 pass breakups. He had 8 tackles (one for loss) and one forced fumble in the season opener against the New York Giants. He made 7 tackles and one pass breakup against the Los Angeles Chargers. He had 10 tackles against the Detroit Lions. He made 9 tackles and one quarterback pressure in the 32–48 Wildcard Playoff loss against the Green Bay Packers. His efforts earned him the NFL's HBCU Spotlight Player of the Year award.

Bell made nine appearances for Dallas in 2024, logging six combined tackles. On November 20, 2024, it was announced that Bell would require season–ending surgery to repair a dislocated shoulder he suffered in Week 11.

On March 9, 2025, Bell signed a three-year, $9 million contract extension with the Cowboys.

== NFL career statistics ==
Legend
**Bold**	Career high

=== Regular season ===
Year	Team	Games		Tackles					Fumbles				Interceptions			
Year	Team	GP	GS	Cmb	Solo	Ast	Sck	TFL	FF	FR	Yds	TD	Int	Yds	TD	PD
2022	DAL	5	0	1	1	0	0.0	0	0	0	0	0	0	0	0	0
2023	DAL	**17**	**8**	**94**	**60**	**34**	0.0	**3**	**2**	0	0	0	0	0	0	**4**
2024	DAL	9	0	6	5	1	0.0	0	0	0	0	0	0	0	0	0
2025	DAL	**17**	3	41	20	21	0.0	1	1	0	0	0	1	24	0	3
2026	DAL	5	0	18	13	5	0.0	0	0	0	0	0	0	0	0	1
Career		53	11	160	99	61	0.0	4	3	0	0	0	1	24	0	8

=== Postseason ===
Year	Team	Games		Tackles					Fumbles				Interceptions			
Year	Team	GP	GS	Cmb	Solo	Ast	Sck	TFL	FF	FR	Yds	TD	Int	Yds	TD	PD
2022	DAL	**2**	0	0	0	0	0.0	0	0	0	0	0	0	0	0	0
2023	DAL	1	**1**	**8**	**5**	**3**	0.0	0	0	0	0	0	0	0	0	0
Career		3	1	8	5	3	0.0	0	0	0	0	0	0	0	0	0

== Legal issues ==
On April 10, 2026, Bell was arrested in Prosper, Texas and charged with felony possession of a controlled substance and a misdemeanor possession of marijuana.
