= Damone Clark =

American football player (born 2000)

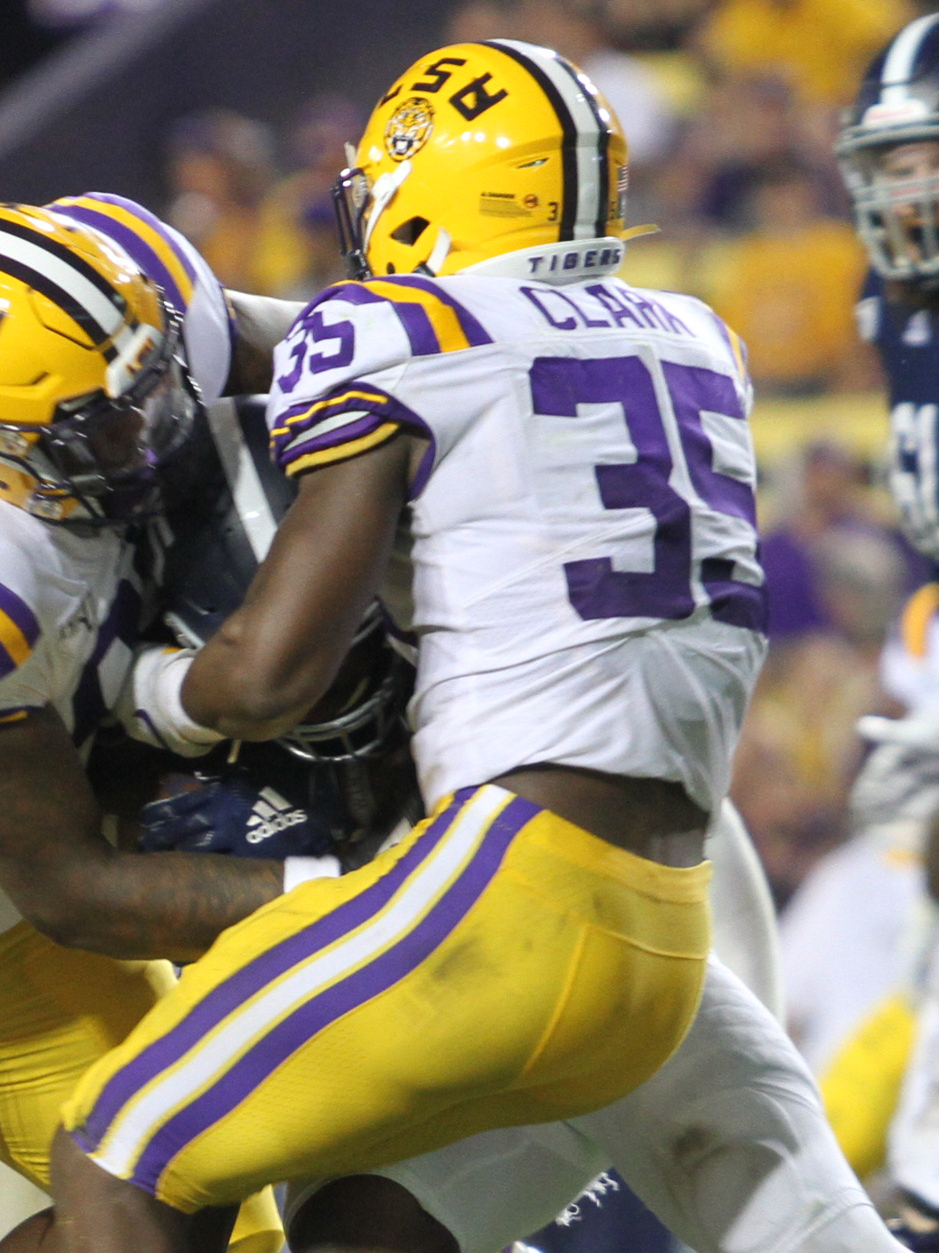
- Clark with the LSU Tigers in 2019

No. 11 – Detroit Lions
- Position: Linebacker
- Roster status: Injured reserve

Personal information
- Born: June 28, 2000 (age 26); New Orleans, Louisiana, U.S.
- Listed height: 6 ft 2 in (1.88 m)
- Listed weight: 245 lb (111 kg)

Career information
- High school: Southern University Laboratory (Baton Rouge, Louisiana)
- College: LSU (2018–2021)
- NFL draft: 2022: 5th round, 176th overall pick

Career history
- Dallas Cowboys (2022–2025); Houston Texans (2025); Detroit Lions (2026–present)

Awards and highlights
- CFP national champion (2019); Second-team All-American (2021); First-team All-SEC (2021)

Career NFL statistics as of 2026
- Total tackles: 212
- Sacks: 0.5
- Forced fumbles: 2
- Fumble recoveries: 1
- Pass deflections: 4
- Stats at Pro Football Reference

Damone Clark (/dəˈmoʊn/ duh-MONE; born June 28, 2000) is an American professional football linebacker for the Detroit Lions of the National Football League (NFL). He played college football for the LSU Tigers.

== Early life ==
Clark was born and lived in New Orleans until his family was displaced by Hurricane Katrina in 2005, after which they moved to Baton Rouge. He attended Southern University Laboratory School in Baton Rouge. During his junior season, Clark recorded 48 tackles, five tackles for loss, and four sacks, and four interceptions.

== College career ==
Clark played in 12 games during his freshman season on special teams and as a reserve linebacker behind starter Devin White. He played in all 15 of LSU's games with three starts as a sophomore and had 49 tackles and 3.5 sacks as the Tigers won the 2020 College Football Playoff National Championship. Clark was chosen to wear the No. 18 jersey by the Tigers' coaching staff going into his junior season. He finished the season tied for the team lead with 63 tackles.

== Professional career ==
Pre-draft measurables
Height	Weight	Arm length	Hand span	Wingspan	40-yard dash	10-yard split	20-yard split	Three-cone drill	Vertical jump	Broad jump
6 ft 2 1/2 in (1.89 m)	239 lb (108 kg)	33 in (0.84 m)	9 3/4 in (0.25 m)	6 ft 6 1/2 in (1.99 m)	4.57 s	1.55 s	2.63 s	7.12 s	36.5 in (0.93 m)	10 ft 7 in (3.23 m)
All values from NFL Combine

=== Dallas Cowboys ===
Clark was selected by the Dallas Cowboys in the fifth round (176th overall) of the 2022 NFL draft. On June 23, 2022, it was announced that Clark had undergone spinal fusion surgery in March and would miss part of the season. He missed the first 7 games while being on Reserve/NFI. He was activated on October 5. In Week 8 against the Chicago Bears, he had 6 tackles and one quarterback pressure. In Week 11 against the Minnesota Vikings, he made his first career start and tallied 4 tackles. In Week 15 against the Jacksonville Jaguars, he had a career-high 11 tackles. He appeared in 10 games (5 starts), registering 50 tackles, 2 forced fumbles, one quarterback pressure and 3 special teams tackles.

In 2023, he started the season opener against the New York Giants, collecting 5 tackles and contributing to a 40-0 victory. In Week 3 against the Arizona Cardinals, he led the team with 9 tackles. In Week 9 against the Philadelphia Eagles, he had a career-high 11 tackles (one for loss). In Week 15 against the Buffalo Bills, he tied his career-high with 11 tackles, along with 2 quarterback pressures. In Week 16 against the Miami Dolphins, he had 9 tackles. He made his first career postseason start against the Green Bay Packers, leading the team with 10 tackles (one for loss), while adding one quarterback pressure. He finished with 17 starts, 115 tackles, 8 quarterback pressures, 3 passes defensed and 2 special teams tackles.

In 2024, the Cowboys hired defensive coordinator Mike Zimmer, to replace Dan Quinn who left to become the head coach of the Washington Commanders. Clark's defensive snaps were reduced significantly, after losing playing time to Eric Kendricks, DeMarvion Overshown and Marist Liufau. In Week 6 against the Detroit Lions, he made his second start of the season, tallying 9 tackles (one for loss), a half sack and one pass break up. He appeared in 14 games (2 starts), posting 25 tackles (one for loss), a half sack, one pass breakup and 4 special teams tackles. He was declared inactive in 3 contests.

In 2025, the Cowboys hired defensive coordinator Matt Eberflus. He remained as a backup player, appearing in 8 games, while making 13 tackles. On November 18, 2025, Clark was waived by the Cowboys. The return from injury of Overshown and the acquisition of Logan Wilson made him expendable in the eyes of Eberflus.

=== Houston Texans ===
On November 19, 2025, Clark was claimed off waivers by the Houston Texans. He appeared in 6 games while playing mostly on special teams and had 14 tackles.

=== Detroit Lions ===
On March 18, 2026, Clark signed a one-year, $1.402 million contract with the Detroit Lions. He was placed on season–ending injured reserve on August 25.

== NFL career statistics ==
Legend
	Led the league
**Bold**	Career high

=== Regular season ===
Year	Team	Games		Tackles				Fumbles				Interceptions			
Year	Team	GP	GS	Cmb	Solo	Ast	Sck	FF	FR	Yds	TD	Int	Yds	TD	PD
2022	DAL	10	5	47	29	18	0.0	**2**	0	0	0	0	0	0	0
2023	DAL	**17**	**17**	**109**	**70**	**39**	0.0	0	**1**	0	0	0	0	0	**3**
2024	DAL	14	2	28	16	12	0.5	0	0	0	0	0	0	0	1
2025	DAL	8	2	14	7	7	0.0	0	0	0	0	0	0	0	0
2025	HOU	6	0	14	7	7	0.0	0	0	0	0	0	0	0	0
Career		55	26	212	129	83	0.5	2	1	0	0	0	0	0	4

=== Postseason ===
Year	Team	Games		Tackles				Fumbles				Interceptions			
Year	Team	GP	GS	Cmb	Solo	Ast	Sck	FF	FR	Yds	TD	Int	Yds	TD	PD
2022	DAL	**2**	0	0	0	0	0	0	**1**	0	0	0	0	0	0
2023	DAL	**1**	**1**	**8**	**5**	**3**	–	–	–	–	–	–	–	–	–
Career		2	0	0	0	0	0	0	1	0	0	0	0	0	0
