= Aviante Collins =

American football player (born 1993)

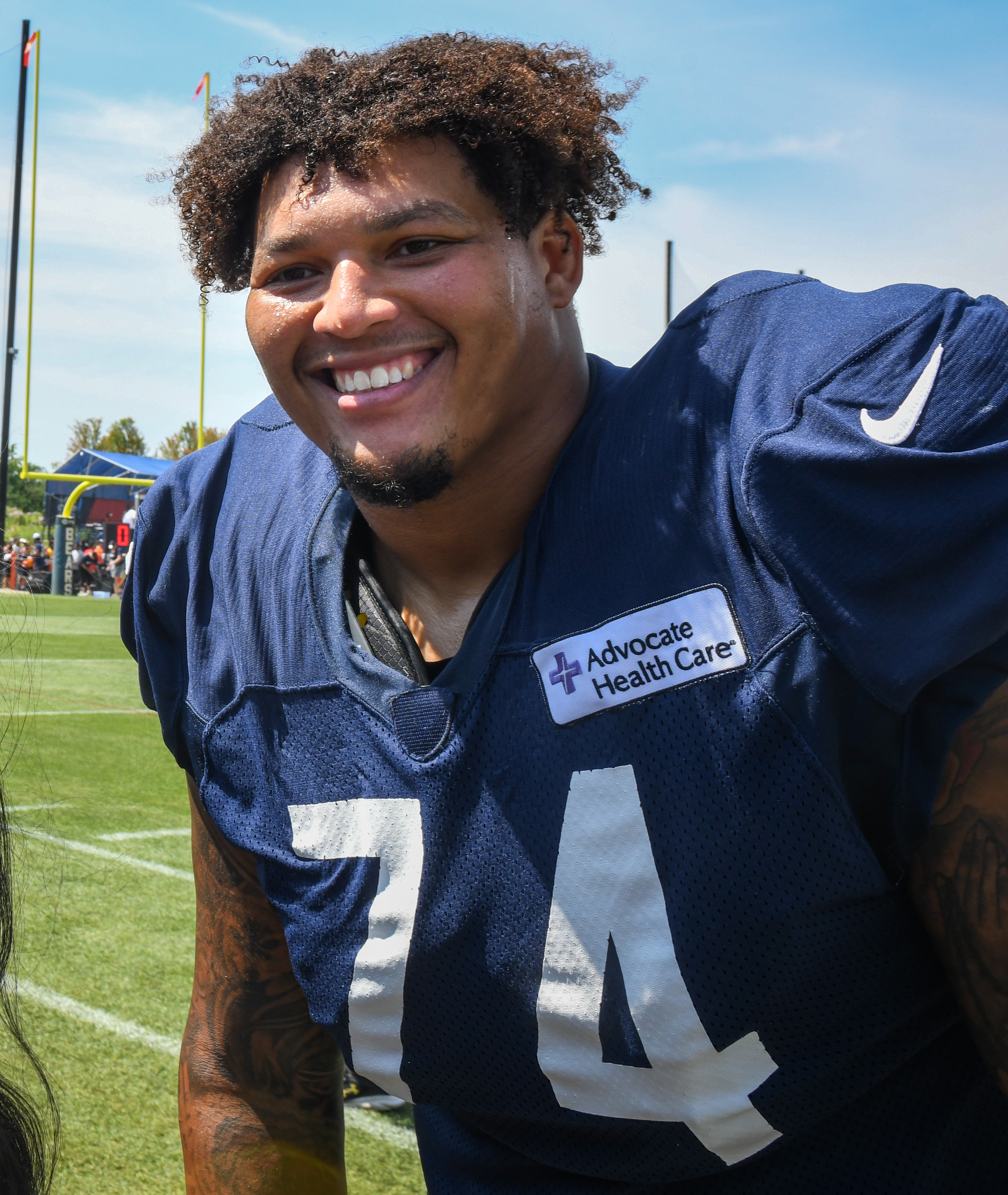
- Collins with the Chicago Bears in 2024

Profile
- Position: Offensive tackle

Personal information
- Born: April 21, 1993 (age 33); Houston, Texas, U.S.
- Listed height: 6 ft 4 in (1.93 m)
- Listed weight: 307 lb (139 kg)

Career information
- High school: Willowridge (Houston, Texas)
- College: TCU (2012–2016)
- NFL draft: 2017: undrafted

Career history
- Minnesota Vikings (2017–2020); Pittsburgh Steelers (2021)*; Dallas Cowboys (2021–2022); Chicago Bears (2023)
- * Offseason or practice squad member only

Career NFL statistics as of 2023
- Games played: 8
- Games started: 1
- Stats at Pro Football Reference

Aviante Collins (born April 21, 1993) is an American professional football offensive tackle. He played college football at TCU.

== Early life ==
Collins attended Willowridge High School in Houston, Texas, where he was a three-year letterman in football and a four-year letterwinner in track and field. He finished third in the shot put at the Class 5A state championships as a sophomore and junior and took fourth as a senior (56'1"). He was the regional champion in the shot put as a senior with a personal-best mark of 59'1/2".

Collins was viewed as a three-star recruit by Rivals.com at offensive tackle, and was ranked as the No. 175 recruit in the state of Texas and the No. 91 offensive tackle overall in the nation. After initially committing to Houston, he ultimately decided to play college football at TCU, turning down scholarship offers from the Cougars and Arizona State.

== College career ==
Collins accepted a football scholarship from Texas Christian University. As true freshman in 2012, he started all 13 games. He began the season at left tackle, before being moved to right tackle.

As a sophomore in 2013, he started 9 contests, the first three at left tackle and the final six at right tackle. As a junior in 2014, he was passed on the depth chart by Tayo Fabuluje at left tackle and Collins was moved to right tackle behind Joseph Noteboom. He appeared in 8 games with one start.

In 2015, he suffered a leg injury in the third game against Southern Methodist University and was given a medical redshirt. As a senior in 2016, he started all 13 games at right tackle. He finished his college career after appearing in 49 games with 36 starts. He also practiced track and field.

== Professional career ==
=== Pre-draft ===
Collins was the top performer at his position in the 2017 NFL Combine; his official 4.81-second 40-yard dash is the third-fastest time ever by an offensive lineman, trailing only Terron Armstead (4.71 seconds) and Lane Johnson (4.72 seconds) on the all-time list. He also bench pressed 225 pounds 34 times, which tied for the second-best mark among all participants at the Combine.

External videos
- Collins' NFL Combine workout

Pre-draft measurables
Height	Weight	Arm length	Hand span	Wingspan	40-yard dash	10-yard split	20-yard split	20-yard shuttle	Three-cone drill	Vertical jump	Broad jump	Bench press
6 ft 4 1/8 in (1.93 m)	295 lb (134 kg)	33 3/8 in (0.85 m)	9 3/8 in (0.24 m)	6 ft 5 5/8 in (1.97 m)	4.81 s	1.69 s	2.81 s	4.75 s	7.85 s	24 in (0.61 m)	8 ft 6 in (2.59 m)	34 reps
All values from NFL Combine except agility drills, vertical and broad jumps from Pro Day

=== Minnesota Vikings ===
Collins was signed as an undrafted free agent by the Minnesota Vikings after the 2017 NFL draft on May 1, 2017.

He competed with Jeremiah Sirles, Reid Fragel, and Rashod Hill to be a backup offensive tackle. Collins was named the third string right tackle behind starter Mike Remmers and backup Rashod Hill to begin the regular season. As a rookie, he played in three games in a reserve role.

On September 10, 2018, Collins was placed on injured reserve with a torn biceps.

In 2019, he suffered a leg injury during training camp that limited his performance. On August 31, 2019, Collins was waived by the Vikings and was signed to the practice squad the next day. He was promoted to the active roster on November 14, 2019. He started in the season finale against the Chicago Bears.

Collins was waived on September 5, 2020, and signed to the Vikings practice squad the next day. He was elevated to the active roster on November 21 for the team's week 11 game against the Dallas Cowboys, and reverted to the practice squad after the game. His practice squad contract with the team expired after the season on January 11, 2021.

=== Pittsburgh Steelers ===
On February 2, 2021, Collins signed a reserve/futures contract with the Pittsburgh Steelers. He was waived on August 24, 2021.

=== Dallas Cowboys ===
On September 6, 2021, Collins was signed to the Dallas Cowboys practice squad.

He signed a reserve/future contract with the Cowboys on January 18, 2022. On August 30, 2022, Collins was waived by the Cowboys and signed to the practice squad the next day. On November 23, 2022, he was elevated to the active roster from the practice squad. On December 3, 2022, he was elevated to the active roster from the practice squad. On December 10, 2022, he was elevated to the active roster from the practice squad. On January 16, 2023, he was elevated to the active roster from the practice squad. On January 21, 2023, he was promoted to the active roster for the NFC Divisional Playoffs game against the San Francisco 49ers. He wasn't re-signed after the season.

=== Chicago Bears ===
On July 26, 2023, Collins signed with the Chicago Bears. He was released on August 29, 2023, and re-signed to the practice squad. He was promoted to the active roster on September 20. He was released on October 29, but re-signed to their practice squad the following day. He appeared in one game as a backup offensive tackle.

Collins signed a reserve/future contract on January 8, 2024. He was released on August 27.

== Personal life ==
His father, Bill, was a notable sprinter at TCU, who won two Southwest Conference titles in the 100 metres in 1974 and 1975. He was inducted into the TCU Letterwinners Association Hall of Fame. His mother, Robin Stephens, received All-American honors at the University of Houston in 1984.
