= Dennis Houston =

American football player (born 1999)

Profile
- Position: Wide receiver

Personal information
- Born: April 24, 1999 (age 27); Fort Hood, Texas, U.S.
- Listed height: 6 ft 1 in (1.85 m)
- Listed weight: 190 lb (86 kg)

Career information
- High school: Earl Warren (San Antonio, Texas)
- College: Houston Baptist (2017); Fullerton (2018); Western Illinois (2019–2021)
- NFL draft: 2022: undrafted

Career history
- Dallas Cowboys (2022); New York Giants (2023)*; Tampa Bay Buccaneers (2024–2025)
- * Offseason or practice squad member only

Awards and highlights
- Third-team FCS All-American (2021); 2× First-team All-MVFC (2020, 2021)

Career NFL statistics as of 2024
- Receptions: 2
- Receiving yards: 16
- Stats at Pro Football Reference

Dennis Houston (born April 24, 1999) is an American professional football wide receiver. He played college football for the Houston Baptist Huskies, Fullerton Hornets and Western Illinois Leathernecks.

== Early life ==
Houston grew up in San Antonio, Texas and attended Earl Warren High School.

== College career ==
Houston began his college football career at Houston Baptist. He caught 33 passes for 362 yards as a freshman. After the season, Houston transferred to Fullerton College and had 360 receiving yards and three touchdowns. He then transferred to Western Illinois for his remaining collegiate eligibility.

As a junior, he led the team with 539 receiving yards on 36 catches and scored three touchdowns.

As a senior, he was named first-team All-Missouri Valley Football Conference (MVFC) after leading the team with 43 receptions and 477 receiving yards with two touchdowns during the spring 2021 season, which was delayed from the fall due to the COVID-19 pandemic.

As a fifth-year senior, Houston caught 90 passes for 1,015 yards and six touchdowns and was again named first-team All-MVFC.

== Professional career ==
Pre-draft measurables
Height	Weight	Arm length	Hand span	Wingspan	40-yard dash	10-yard split	20-yard split	20-yard shuttle	Three-cone drill	Vertical jump	Broad jump	Bench press
6 ft 1 1/8 in (1.86 m)	198 lb (90 kg)	31 5/8 in (0.80 m)	8 5/8 in (0.22 m)	6 ft 3 1/2 in (1.92 m)	4.49 s	1.55 s	2.69 s	4.35 s	7.17 s	39.0 in (0.99 m)	10 ft 4 in (3.15 m)	19 reps
All values from Pro Day

=== Dallas Cowboys ===
Houston was signed as an undrafted free agent by the Dallas Cowboys after the 2022 NFL draft on May 3. During training camp, he took advantage of injuries to wide receivers Michael Gallup and James Washington to pass third-round draft choice Jalen Tolbert on the depth chart. The Cowboys gave him a chance to grow his role on the team during the first two games of the season. He recorded two receptions for 16 yards. He was waived on September 20 and re-signed to the practice squad. He signed a reserve/future contract on January 25, 2023. He was waived on August 29, 2023.

=== New York Giants ===
On August 31, 2023, Houston was signed to the New York Giants practice squad. Following the end of the regular season, the Giants signed him to a reserve/future contract on January 8, 2024. Houston was waived with an injury settlement by the Giants on August 20.

=== Tampa Bay Buccaneers ===
On October 23, 2024, Houston signed with the Tampa Bay Buccaneers's practice squad. He signed a reserve/future contract with the Buccaneers on January 14, 2025.

On August 26, 2025, Houston was waived by the Buccaneers as part of final roster cuts and re-signed to the practice squad the next day. On January 8, 2026, he signed a reserve/futures contract with Tampa Bay.

On August 26, 2026, Houston was waived with an injury designation.

== Legal issues ==
Houston and another football player were charged with aggravated sexual assault during his freshman season at Houston Baptist in 2017.
