= Ian Bunting =

American football player (born 1996)

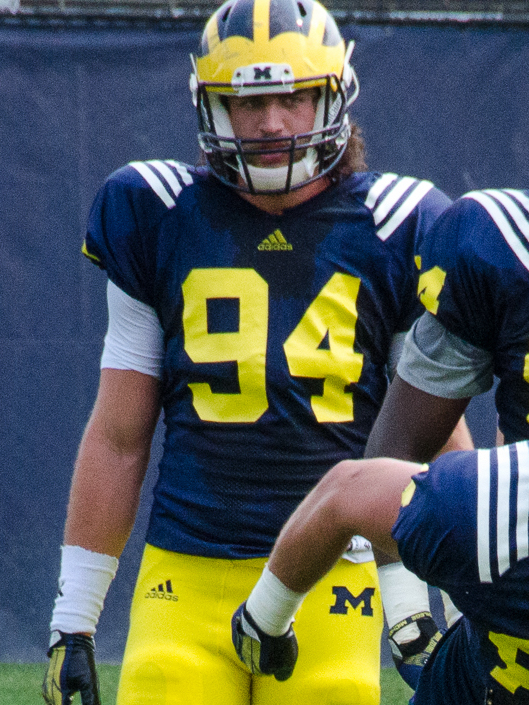
- Bunting with Michigan in 2014

Profile
- Position: Tight end

Personal information
- Born: February 10, 1996 (age 30); Hinsdale, Illinois, U.S.
- Listed height: 6 ft 7 in (2.01 m)
- Listed weight: 257 lb (117 kg)

Career information
- High school: Hinsdale (IL)
- College: Michigan; California
- NFL draft: 2019: undrafted

Career history
- Chicago Bears (2019)*; New York Jets (2019)*; Indianapolis Colts (2019–2020)*; Arizona Cardinals (2021)*; Seattle Seahawks (2021)*; Dallas Cowboys (2021–2022)
- * Offseason or practice squad member only

Career NFL statistics
- Games played: 1
- Stats at Pro Football Reference

Ian Alexander Bunting (born February 10, 1996) is an American professional football tight end. He played college football at Michigan and California and was signed as an undrafted free agent in 2019. Bunting has been a member of the Chicago Bears, New York Jets, Indianapolis Colts, Arizona Cardinals, and Seattle Seahawks, and Dallas Cowboys.

== Early life ==
Bunting was born on February 10, 1996, in Hinsdale, Illinois. He attended Hinsdale Central High School, playing football on offense and defense.

As a senior, he was moved from wide receiver to tight end. He recorded a total of 27 pass receptions for 583 yards and four touchdowns on offense, and also made 12 tackles and two sacks on defense.

He also practiced basketball.

== College career ==
Bunting accepted a football scholarship from the University of Michigan. As a redshirt freshman in 2014, he did not appear in any games.

As a sophomore in 2015, he made five catches as a backup tight end, deep on the depth chart behind Jake Butt.

As a junior in 2016, he started seven games when the team opened in a two tight end formation and recorded five catches again. He was the third-string tight end behind Butt and Khalid Hill.

As a senior in 2017, he made just one catch, after being the fourth-string tight end behind Sean McKeon, Zach Gentry and Hill.

Bunting appeared in a total of 34 games for the school before transferring to the University of California.

In his lone season at California as a fifth-year senior, he appeared in 13 games with four starts. He made 18 catches for 195 yards in the season. Against Oregon, he made his career-long reception of 45 yards.

== Professional career ==
Pre-draft measurables
Height	Weight	Arm length	Hand span	40-yard dash	10-yard split	20-yard split	20-yard shuttle	Three-cone drill	Vertical jump	Broad jump	Bench press
6 ft 6 1/2 in (1.99 m)	247 lb (112 kg)	34 in (0.86 m)	10 5/8 in (0.27 m)	4.93 s	1.72 s	2.77 s	4.39 s	7.31 s	35.0 in (0.89 m)	10 ft 3 in (3.12 m)	17 reps
All values from Pro Day

=== Chicago Bears ===
After going unselected in the 2019 NFL draft, Bunting was signed by the Chicago Bears as an undrafted free agent. He was waived at the final roster cuts on August 31.

=== New York Jets ===
Bunting was signed to the practice squad of the New York Jets on September 2, 2019, and was released on September 25.

=== Indianapolis Colts ===
On October 8, 2019, Bunting was signed by the Indianapolis Colts to the practice squad. He was signed to a futures contract on December 30. He was released at the final roster cuts with an injury settlement on September 1, 2020.

=== Arizona Cardinals ===
Bunting was signed by the Arizona Cardinals to a futures contract on January 5, 2021, but was waived on August 23.

=== Seattle Seahawks ===
On August 26, 2021, after the retirement of Luke Willson, Bunting was signed by the Seattle Seahawks. He was waived on August 31.

=== Dallas Cowboys ===
On September 3, 2021, Bunting was signed by the Dallas Cowboys to their practice squad. He was elevated from the practice squad to the active roster for their Week 14 game against the Washington Football Team. He replaced an injured Sean McKeon and made his NFL debut in the 27–20 win, while playing 12 special teams snaps and 3 snaps on offense.

He signed a reserve/future contract with the Cowboys on January 18, 2022. He was waived/injured on August 15, 2022 and placed on injured reserve with a neck injury. He was waived on April 24, 2023, with a failed physical designation from the same neck injury.
