= Aaron Shampklin =

American football player (born 1998)

No. 29, 33
- Position: Running back

Personal information
- Born: October 18, 1999 (age 27); Paramount, California, U.S.
- Listed height: 5 ft 10 in (1.78 m)
- Listed weight: 195 lb (88 kg)

Career information
- High school: Long Beach Polytechnic (Long Beach, California)
- College: Harvard (2017–2021)
- NFL draft: 2022: undrafted

Career history
- Dallas Cowboys (2022)*; Indianapolis Colts (2022–2023)*; Houston Gamblers (2023); Los Angeles Chargers (2023)*; Pittsburgh Steelers (2024); Miami Dolphins (2025)*; Montreal Alouettes (2026)*
- * Offseason or practice squad member only

Awards and highlights
- 2× First-team All-Ivy League (2018, 2021)

Career NFL statistics
- Rushing attempts: 6
- Rushing yards: 17
- Receptions: 0
- Receiving yards: 0
- Total touchdowns: 0
- Stats at Pro Football Reference

Aaron Shampklin (born October 18, 1999) is an American former professional football player who was a running back in the National Football League (NFL). He played college football for the Harvard Crimson. He played professionally for the Dallas Cowboys, Indianapolis Colts, Houston Gamblers, Los Angeles Chargers and Pittsburgh Steelers.

== Early life ==
Shampklin was born in Paramount, California, on October 18, 1999. He attended Long Beach Polytechnic High School in Long Beach.

== College career ==
Shampklin played college football at Harvard University, where he graduated with a degree in economics.

In 2017, Shampklin scored his first career touchdown against Rhode Island. He finished the year with 363 rushing yards and three TDs for the Crimson. In 2018, Shampklin played in all 10 games and was named first team All-Ivy League. He scored four touchdowns against San Diego along with a career-high 178 rushing yards. Shampklin finished with 1,053 rushing yards on 173 carries and nine touchdowns. Shampklin would not play the following two seasons, due to injury in 2019 and the 2020 cancellation and the Ivy League cancelling their 2020 football season. In 2021, Shampklin was name all-Ivy League for a second time. He ran for 835 yards and 11 touchdowns.

=== College statistics ===
College statistics
Year	Team	GP	Rushing					Receiving				
Year	Team	GP	Att	Yds	Avg	Lng	TD	Rec	Yds	Avg	Lng	TD
2017	Harvard	10	81	363	4.5	23	3	5	46	9.2	17	1
2018	Harvard	10	173	1,053	6.1	64	9	8	133	16.6	74	1
2021	Harvard	9	148	835	5.6	72	11	16	117	12.1	31	1
Career		29	402	2,251	5.4	72	23	29	296	12.6	74	3

== Professional career ==
Pre-draft measurables
Height	Weight	Arm length	Hand span	40-yard dash	10-yard split	20-yard split	20-yard shuttle	Three-cone drill	Vertical jump	Broad jump	Bench press
5 ft 9 3/8 in (1.76 m)	194 lb (88 kg)	30 5/8 in (0.78 m)	9 1/8 in (0.23 m)	4.48 s	1.57 s	2.47 s	4.32 s	6.94 s	37.5 in (0.95 m)	10 ft 1 in (3.07 m)	19 reps
All values from Pro Day

=== Dallas Cowboys ===
Shampklin signed with the Dallas Cowboys as an undrafted free agent on May 3, 2022. He was placed on injured reserve on August 31, 2022. He was then released on September 2, 2022.

=== Indianapolis Colts ===
On December 20, 2022, Shampklin signed with the Indianapolis Colts practice squad. He signed a reserve/futures contract on January 9, 2023. He was released on May 2.

=== Houston Gamblers ===
On May 18, 2023, Shampklin signed with the Houston Gamblers of the USFL. In three games with the Gamblers, Shampklin ran for 52 yards on 12 attempts. He was released on August 1.

=== Los Angeles Chargers ===
Shampklin signed with the Los Angeles Chargers on August 15, 2023. He was waived on August 29.

=== Pittsburgh Steelers ===
Shampklin signed a reserve/futures contract with the Pittsburgh Steelers on January 17, 2024. He was waived on August 27 and signed to the practice squad on September 4. He was elevated to the active roster ahead of the Steelers Week 4 matchup with the Indianapolis Colts, in which he made his NFL debut. He was released on October 28, 2024, and re-signed to the practice squad.

Shampklin signed a reserve/future contract with Pittsburgh on January 14, 2025. On May 12, Shampklin was released by the Steelers.

=== Miami Dolphins ===
On August 11, 2025, Shampklin signed with the Miami Dolphins. He was waived on August 26 as part of final roster cuts.

=== Montreal Alouettes ===
On December 18, 2025, Shampklin signed with the Montreal Alouettes of the Canadian Football League (CFL). On April 7, 2026, Shamklin was placed on the retired list.
