= Matt Waletzko =

American football player (born 1999)

No. 73 – Kansas City Chiefs
- Position: Offensive tackle
- Roster status: Injured reserve

Personal information
- Born: December 15, 1999 (age 26); Cold Spring, Minnesota, U.S.
- Listed height: 6 ft 8 in (2.03 m)
- Listed weight: 305 lb (138 kg)

Career information
- High school: Rocori (Cold Spring)
- College: North Dakota (2018–2021)
- NFL draft: 2022: 5th round, 155th overall pick

Career history
- Dallas Cowboys (2022–2024); Minnesota Vikings (2025)*; Kansas City Chiefs (2025–present)*
- * Offseason or practice squad member only

Awards and highlights
- First-team All-MVFC (2021); Second-team All-MVFC (2020)

Career NFL statistics as of 2024
- Games played: 11
- Stats at Pro Football Reference

Matt Waletzko (born December 15, 1999) is an American professional football offensive tackle for the Kansas City Chiefs of the National Football League (NFL). He played college football for the North Dakota Fighting Hawks.

== Early life ==
Waletzko grew up in Cold Spring, Minnesota and attended Rocori High School. He was a two-way player as a senior.

== College career ==
Waletzko was a member of the North Dakota Fighting Hawks for four seasons. The team pulled his redshirt designation, allowing him to play in nine games and start the final five contests of the season at left tackle as a true freshman.

Waletzko started the first six games of his sophomore season before suffering a season-ending knee injury (torn left ACL).

He started all seven of UND's games during his junior season, which was shortened and played in the spring of 2021 due to the COVID-19 pandemic, and was named second-team All-Missouri Valley Football Conference (MVFC). He was part of an offensive line that led the Football Championship Subdivision and ranked third in the nation in sacks allowed (2) and led the nation with the fewest number of negative plays (24).

Waletzko started the first ten games of his senior season before missing his final game due to a left shoulder injury and was named first-team All-MVFC. He was part of an offensive line that led the Football Championship Subdivision and ranked third in the nation in sacks allowed (3), while ranking second in the Missouri Valley Conference and fifth in the nation in fewest negative plays allowed (5).

== Professional career ==
Pre-draft measurables
Height	Weight	Arm length	Hand span	Wingspan	40-yard dash	10-yard split	20-yard split	20-yard shuttle	Three-cone drill	Vertical jump	Broad jump	Bench press
6 ft 7 5/8 in (2.02 m)	312 lb (142 kg)	36 1/8 in (0.92 m)	10 1/4 in (0.26 m)	7 ft 1 5/8 in (2.17 m)	5.03 s	1.73 s	2.87 s	4.59 s	7.26 s	30.0 in (0.76 m)	9 ft 5 in (2.87 m)	28 reps
All values from NFL Combine/Pro Day

=== Dallas Cowboys ===
Waletzko was selected by the Dallas Cowboys in the fifth round (155th overall) of the 2022 NFL draft. The Cowboys previously obtained the selection in the trade that sent Amari Cooper to the Cleveland Browns. He was given a chance to compete with second-year player Josh Ball for the reserve swing tackle position. He suffered a shoulder subluxation, when his previous injury resurfaced during the second practice of training camp. He missed most of the preseason with the shoulder injury that eventually would require surgery. He played in the third preseason game against the Seattle Seahawks. He played mostly on special teams in the first three games of the season. His only offensive snap was a play that helped spring running back Ezekiel Elliott for a 1-yard touchdown in a 23–16 win against the New York Giants. He again suffered a left shoulder subluxation while practicing for the seventh game of the season. He was placed on injured reserve on October 22, 2022.

On August 30, 2023, Waletzko was placed on injured reserve with a shoulder injury. He was activated on December 27, 2023. He was declared inactive in the Week 17 game against the Detroit Lions. He appeared in one game as a backup in the season finale against the Washington Commanders.

In 2024, he appeared in seven games as a backup, playing mainly on special teams. He was declared inactive in 10 contests.

In 2025, he didn't make notable improvements compared to previous seasons and was moved to offensive guard during the preseason. On August 2, 2025, Waltezko was waived/injured by the Cowboys.

=== Minnesota Vikings ===
On September 30, 2025, Waletzko signed with the Minnesota Vikings' practice squad. He was released from the practice squad on October 7.

=== Kansas City Chiefs ===
On December 3, 2025, Waletzko signed with the Kansas City Chiefs' practice squad. He signed a reserve/future contract with Kansas City on January 5, 2026. On August 20, Waletzko was waived/injured by the Chiefs.
