= Quandre Mosely =

American football player (born 1999)

Profile
- Position: Cornerback

Personal information
- Born: May 8, 1999 (age 27); Brunswick, Georgia, U.S.
- Listed height: 6 ft 1 in (1.85 m)
- Listed weight: 198 lb (90 kg)

Career information
- High school: Glynn Academy
- College: Eastern Arizona; Kentucky
- NFL draft: 2022: undrafted

Career history
- Dallas Cowboys (2022)*; Seattle Seahawks (2022)*; Tampa Bay Buccaneers (2022)*; New England Patriots (2022–2023)*; Tampa Bay Buccaneers (2023)*; Carolina Panthers (2024)*
- * Offseason or practice squad member only
- Stats at Pro Football Reference

Quandre Mosely (born May 8, 1999) is an American professional football cornerback. He played college football at Eastern Arizona College and the University of Kentucky. He played two seasons at the junior college level before joining Kentucky in 2019.

== Early life and college ==
Mosely attended Glynn Academy. As a senior, he contributed to the team having an 11–2 record, while receiving All-state honorable-mention honors at wide receiver.

He enrolled at Eastern Arizona College, where he was switched to safety. As a sophomore, he had 50 tackles, 6 interceptions (led the league), one fumble recovery and returned an interception for a touchdown. He received All-Western States and All-League honors.

As a junior, he transferred to the University of Kentucky. He appeared in all 13 games with 2 starts. He had 24 tackles (one for loss), 3 passes defensed, one sack and one interception. He had 5 tackles against the University of Arkansas and the University of Tennessee at Martin.

As a senior, he appeared in 10 games. He posted 19 tackles and 2 passes defensed. He had 6 tackles and 2 passes defensed against the University of Alabama.

As a fifth-year senior, he appeared in all 13 games with 2 starts. He registered 26 tackles (2 for loss), 2 interceptions, 5 passes defensed and one touchdown. He returned an interception for a touchdown against New Mexico State University.

== Professional career ==
Pre-draft measurables
| Height | Weight | Arm length | Hand span | 40-yard dash | 10-yard split | 20-yard split | 20-yard shuttle | Three-cone drill | Vertical jump | Broad jump | Bench press |
|---|---|---|---|---|---|---|---|---|---|---|---|
| 6 ft 0 3/4 in (1.85 m) | 185 lb (84 kg) | 32 5/8 in (0.83 m) | 9 5/8 in (0.24 m) | 4.40 s | 1.62 s | 2.55 s | 4.32 s | 6.89 s | 36.0 in (0.91 m) | 10 ft 1 in (3.07 m) | 9 reps |
All values from Pro Day

=== Dallas Cowboys ===
Mosley was signed as an undrafted free agent by the Dallas Cowboys after the 2022 NFL draft on May 22. He was waived by the Cowboys on August 22, 2022.

=== Seattle Seahawks ===
Mosely worked out for the Philadelphia Eagles before being signed to the practice squad of the Seattle Seahawks on August 31, 2022. He was released on October 4.

=== Tampa Bay Buccaneers (first stint) ===
On October 12, 2022, Mosely was signed to the Tampa Bay Buccaneers practice squad. He was released on November 29.

=== New England Patriots ===
On December 5, 2022, Mosely was signed to the New England Patriots practice squad. He signed a reserve/future contract on January 10, 2023. He was waived on August 27, 2023.

=== Tampa Bay Buccaneers (second stint) ===
On November 22, 2023, Mosely was signed to the Buccaneers practice squad. He signed a reserve/future contract on January 23, 2024. On May 12, 2024, Mosely was released by the Buccaneers after rookie mini-camp.

=== Carolina Panthers ===
On August 19, 2024, Mosely signed with the Carolina Panthers. He was waived on August 27.
