= Tyrique Stevenson =

American football player (born 2000)

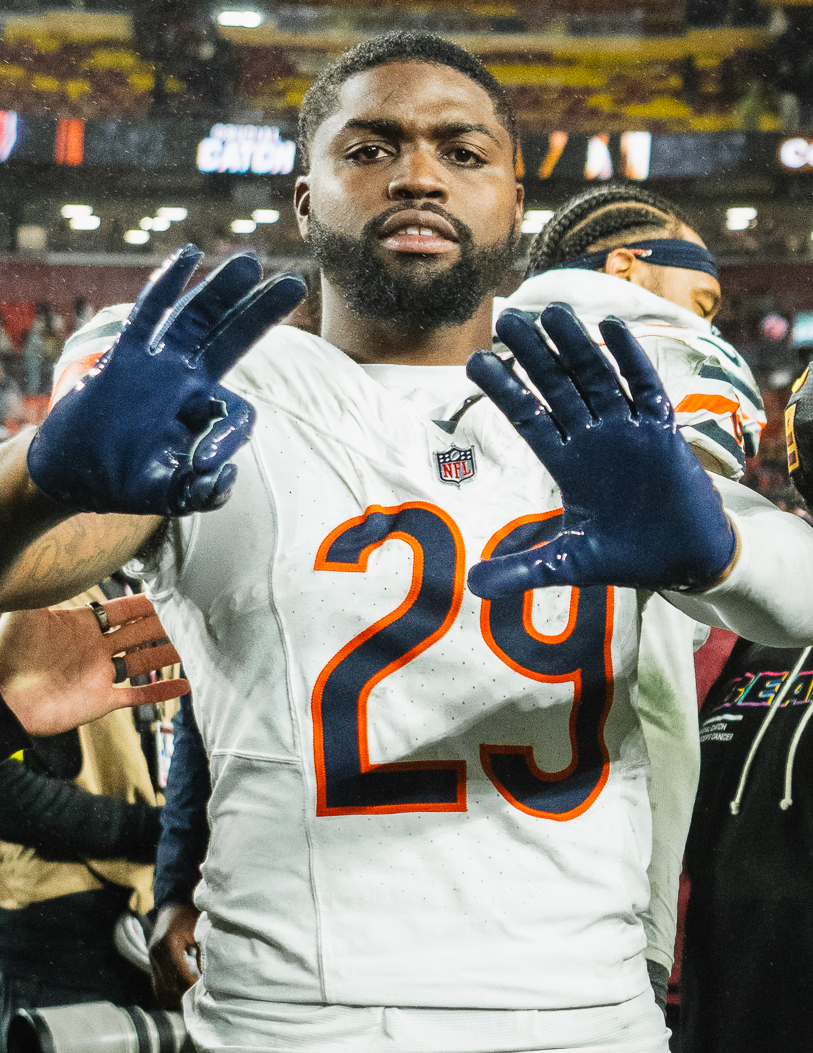
- Stevenson in 2025

No. 29 – Chicago Bears
- Position: Cornerback
- Roster status: Active

Personal information
- Born: May 26, 2000 (age 26); Miami, Florida, U.S.
- Listed height: 6 ft 0 in (1.83 m)
- Listed weight: 212 lb (96 kg)

Career information
- High school: Miami Southridge (South Miami Heights, Florida)
- College: Georgia (2019–2020); Miami (FL) (2021–2022)
- NFL draft: 2023: 2nd round, 56th overall pick

Career history
- Chicago Bears (2023–present)

Awards and highlights
- Third-team All-ACC (2022)

Career NFL statistics as of Week 9, 2026
- Total tackles: 247
- Forced fumbles: 5
- Fumble recoveries: 2
- Pass deflections: 42
- Interceptions: 7
- Defensive touchdowns: 1
- Stats at Pro Football Reference

Tyrique Marquis Stevenson (born May 26, 2000) is an American professional football cornerback for the Chicago Bears of the National Football League (NFL). He played college football for the Georgia Bulldogs and Miami Hurricanes and was selected by the Bears in the second round of the 2023 NFL draft.

== Early life ==
Stevenson was born on May 26, 2000, in Miami, Florida. He attended South Dade Senior High School and transferred to Miami Southridge Senior High School for his senior year.

== College career ==
Stevenson began his college career at Georgia and joined the team as an early enrollee. He played in all 14 of the Bulldogs' games during his freshman season and made 13 tackles with one sack and five passes defended. Stevenson played in all 10 of Georgia's games with four starts during the team's COVID-19 shortened 2020 season and finished the year with 34 tackles and five passes broken up.

After the season, Stevenson chose to transfer to Miami. He made 43 tackles with 2.5 tackles for loss, four passes broken up, and one interception in his first season with the team.

== Professional career ==
=== Pre-draft ===
Pro Football Focus ranked him as the seventh best cornerback prospect (44th overall) on their big board. ESPN analyst Mel Kiper Jr. ranked him as the seventh best cornerback in the draft. Dane Brugler of the Athletic had him ranked 10th among all cornerback prospects available in the draft. The majority of NFL draft analysts and scouts projected him to be selected in either the second or third round of the 2023 NFL Draft. Cory Giddings of Bleacher Report ranked him as the 17th best cornerback (123rd overall) and projected him to be drafted in the fourth round.

External videos
- Tyrique Stevenson's College Highlights
- Tyrique Stevenson's Combine Workout

Pre-draft measurables
| Height | Weight | Arm length | Hand span | Wingspan | 40-yard dash | 10-yard split | 20-yard split | 20-yard shuttle | Three-cone drill | Vertical jump | Broad jump |
|---|---|---|---|---|---|---|---|---|---|---|---|
| 6 ft 0 3/8 in (1.84 m) | 198 lb (90 kg) | 32 3/8 in (0.82 m) | 9 5/8 in (0.24 m) | 6 ft 5 5/8 in (1.97 m) | 4.45 s | 1.51 s | 2.57 s | 4.41 s | 7.09 s | 38.5 in (0.98 m) | 10 ft 5 in (3.18 m) |
All values from NFL Combine

=== 2023 ===
The Chicago Bears selected Stevenson in the second round (56th overall) of the 2023 NFL draft. The Chicago Bears orchestrated a trade in order to secure the ability to select Stevenson, sending their 2023 second-(61st overall) and fifth-round picks (136th overall) to the Jacksonville Jaguars in return for the Jaguars' 2023 second-round (56th overall) selection to draft Stevenson. He was the eighth cornerback drafted in 2023 and was the first of two cornerbacks drafted by the Bears, along with fifth-round pick (165th overall) Terell Smith.

External videos
- Bears select Tyrique Stevenson No. 56
- 2023 Draft Profile: Tyrique Stevenson

On June 15, 2023, the Chicago Bears signed Stevenson to a four–year, $6.44 million rookie contract that includes $3.48 million guaranteed upon signing and an initial signing bonus of $1.69 million.

Throughout training camp, he competed to be the No. 2 starting cornerback against Kindle Vildor under defensive coordinator Alan Williams. Head coach Matt Eberflus named Stevenson a starter and listed him as the second cornerback on the depth chart to begin the season and he started alongside No. 1 starting cornerback Jaylon Johnson and starting nickelback Kyler Gordon.

On September 10, 2023, Stevenson made his professional regular season debut and earned his first career start in the Chicago Bears' home-opener against the Green Bay Packers and had six combined tackles (five solo) during a 20–38 loss. On September 20, 2023, Bears' defensive coordinator Alan Williams resigned due to personal issues. In Week 8, Stevenson set a season-high with 12 combined tackles (eight solo) during a 13–30 loss at the Los Angeles Chargers. On November 19, 2023, he made four combined tackles (three solo), a pass deflection, and had his first career interception on a pass attempt thrown by Jared Goff to tight end Sam LaPorta as the Bears lost 26–31 at the Detroit Lions. On November 25, 2023, Stevenson injured his ankle during practice and was subsequently inactive for the Bears' 12–10 victory at the Minnesota Vikings on Monday Night Football in Week 12. In Week 17, Stevenson had five combined tackles (four solo), set a season-high with four pass deflections, and had a career-high two interceptions off passes thrown by Taylor Heinicke during a 37–17 victory against the Atlanta Falcons, earning NFC Defensive Player of the Week for his performance. He finished his rookie season in 2023 with a total of 86 combined tackles (65 solo), 16 pass deflections, and four interceptions in 16 games and 16 starts. He received an overall grade of 60.2 from Pro Football Focus as a rookie in 2023.

=== 2024 ===
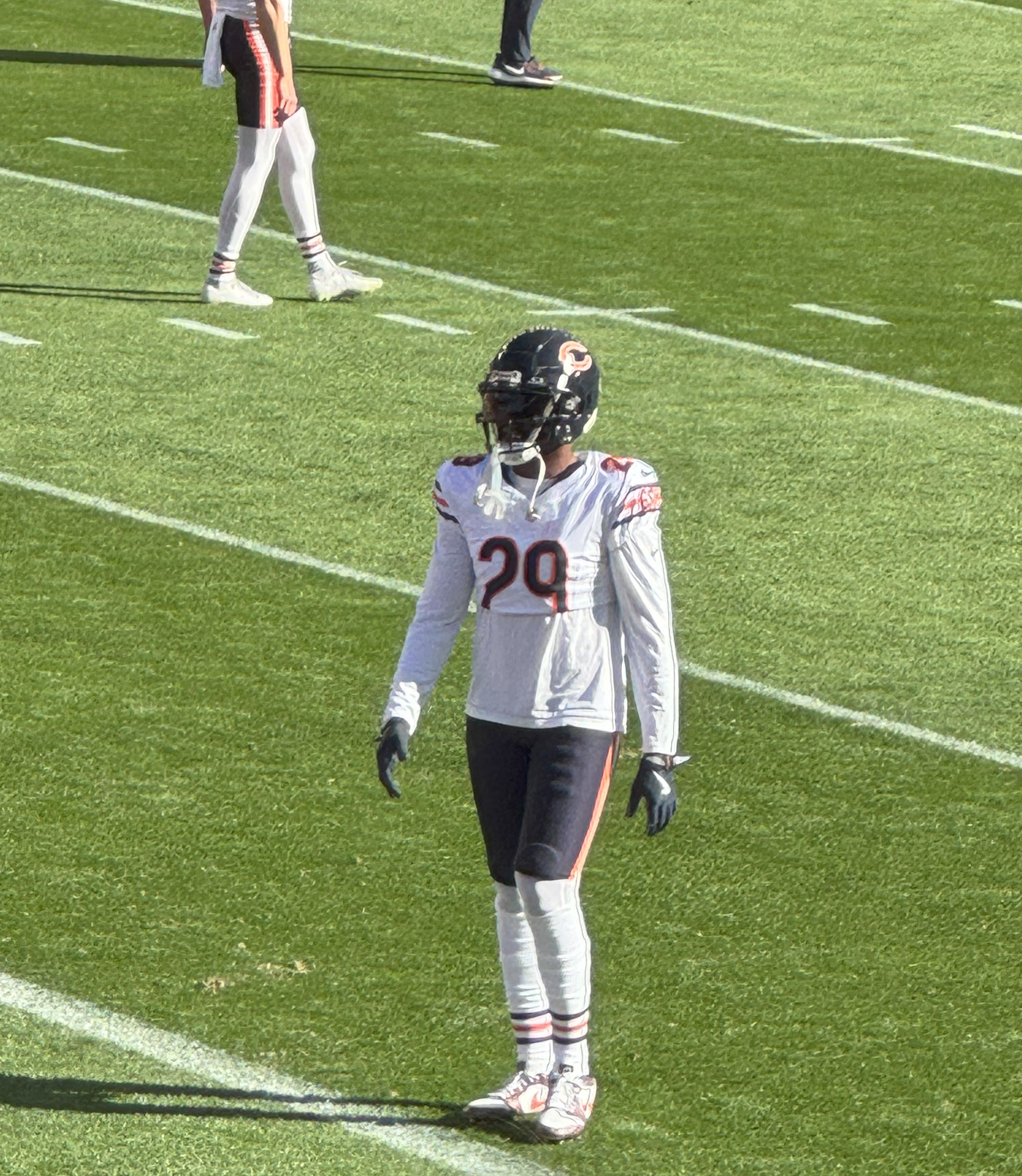
Stevenson in 2024

The Bears hired Eric Washington as their new defensive coordinator after Alan Williams resigned at the beginning of the 2023 NFL season. Washington chose to retain Stevenson and Jaylon Johnson as the starting cornerbacks to begin the regular season.

On September 8, 2024, Stevenson was benched for the start of the Chicago Bears' home-opener against the Tennessee Titans in lue of Terell Smith, but still received significant playing time, producing four combined tackles (two solo), two pass deflections, and scored his first career touchdown on a pick-six after picking off a pass by quarterback Will Levis and returned it 43–yards in the fourth quarter to score the game-winning touchdown in a 24–17 comeback victory. His performance earned him NFC Defensive Player of the Week. On September 20, he received a $8,143 fine for taunting due to an incident where he had his hands to the face of wide receiver Nico Collins that started a brief altercation in the Bears' 13–19 loss at the Houston Texans in Week 2. On October 10, he injured his calf in practice and was subsequently inactive during a 35–16 victory against the Jacksonville Jaguars in Week 6.

Stevenson set a season-high with nine combined tackles (seven solo) and had one pass deflection during a Week 8 matchup at the Washington Commanders. On the final play, Stevenson was observed taunting the crowd near the Commanders' sideline with his back to the beginning of the play, before ultimately tipping a Hail Mary pass thrown by Jayden Daniels into the hands of Commanders' wide receiver Noah Brown in the end zone to lose the game 18–15. As a result, Stevenson was removed from the starting lineup the following week.

In the Bears' 20–23 Thanksgiving Day loss to the Detroit Lions, Stevenson produced five combined tackles (three solo) and made one pass deflection. He was also involved in an incident where he was observed tripping wide receiver Jameson Williams as he was standing out-of-play and Williams was about to bump into him as he was running out-of-bounds following a nine-yard reception in the fourth quarter. Williams retaliated by tossing the ball at his face and was penalized 15–yards for taunting. On December 6, he reportedly received a fine of $19,697 for unsportsmanlike conduct after the league reviewed the sequence of the incident. The following day, the Bears fired head coach Matt Eberflus after they fell to a record of 4–8 and appointed offensive coordinator Thomas Brown to interim head coach for the remaining five games of the season.

He finished the 2024 NFL season with a total of 78 combined tackles (51 solo), 12 pass deflections, two interceptions, and one touchdown in 16 games and 16 starts. He received an overall grade of 58.9 from Pro Football Focus, which ranked 133rd among 222 qualifying cornerbacks in 2024.

=== 2025 ===
For 2025, new Bears head coach Ben Johnson brought in a defensive staff that included coordinator Dennis Allen and defensive backs coach Al Harris. Stevenson lauded both coaches before the season, saying he appreciated Allen's emphasis on man-to-man defense for corners while Harris was pivotal in helping him understand new defensive concepts.

In what Johnson called an "open battle", Stevenson competed with Nahshon Wright and Terell Smith to be the No. 2 cornerback. He won the job for the regular season. He struggled to begin the year, allowing opposing quarterbacks to complete seven of eight passes for 124 yards and a touchdown through the first two games. In Week 3 against the Dallas Cowboys, the Bears defense initially surrendered a 22-yard run by Javonte Williams until Stevenson ripped the ball from his hands before he got out of bounds; it was the first of four turnovers forced by Chicago in the 31–14 win.A week later, he recorded what would be his only interception of the season off Geno Smith as the Bears defeated the Las Vegas Raiders.

Late in the season, he missed two games with a hip injury. Upon Stevenson's return, he began to see reduced action while Wright received more playing time. He did not play at all in the final game despite being healthy, which Johnson defended as wanting Jaylon Johnson and Wright to "take a bulk of the snaps."

Steevenson made his playoff debut in the wild card round against the Packers, recording two tackles and a Pro Football Focus grade of 77.2, the second best among Bears defenders. He had three assisted tackles in the following week's divisional round loss to the Los Angeles Rams.

He concluded the season with 49 combined tackles (36 solo), a tackle for loss, ten pass deflections, and two forced fumbles. Sam Householder of Windy City Gridiron wrote that Stevenson's 2025 was "[C]onsidered a disappointment […] from up-and-down play. [H]e was never able to earn back playing time."

== NFL career statistics ==
Legend
| **Bold** | Career high |

=== Regular season ===
| Year | Team | Games | | Tackles | | | | | Interceptions | | | | | | Fumbles | | | | |
| Year | Team | GP | GS | Cmb | Solo | Ast | Sck | TFL | Int | Yds | Avg | Lng | TD | PD | FF | Fmb | FR | Yds | TD |
|---|---|---|---|---|---|---|---|---|---|---|---|---|---|---|---|---|---|---|---|
| 2023 | CHI | 16 | 16 | **86** | **65** | 21 | 0.0 | **1** | **4** | **45** | 11.3 | 34 | 0 | **16** | **2** | 0 | 0 | 0 | 0 |
| 2024 | CHI | 16 | 14 | 78 | 51 | **27** | 0.0 | **1** | 2 | 43 | **21.5** | **43** | **1** | 12 | 1 | 0 | 0 | 0 | 0 |
| 2025 | CHI | 13 | 10 | 49 | 36 | 13 | 0.0 | **1** | 1 | 3 | 1.5 | 3 | 0 | 10 | **2** | 0 | **2** | **-19** | 0 |
| 2026 | CHI | 8 | 6 | 34 | 23 | 11 | 0.0 | 2 | 0 | 0 | 0.0 | 0 | 0 | 4 | 0 | 0 | 0 | 0 | 0 |
| Career | | 53 | 46 | 247 | 175 | 72 | 0.0 | 5 | 7 | 91 | 13.0 | 43 | 1 | 42 | 5 | 0 | 2 | -19 | 0 |

=== Postseason ===
| Year | Team | Games | | Tackles | | | | | Interceptions | | | | | | Fumbles | | | | |
| Year | Team | GP | GS | Cmb | Solo | Ast | Sck | TFL | Int | Yds | Avg | Lng | TD | PD | FF | Fmb | FR | Yds | TD |
|---|---|---|---|---|---|---|---|---|---|---|---|---|---|---|---|---|---|---|---|
| 2025 | CHI | 2 | 0 | 5 | 2 | 3 | 0.0 | 0 | 0 | 0 | 0.0 | 0 | 0 | 2 | 1 | 0 | 0 | 0 | 0 |
| Career | | 2 | 0 | 5 | 2 | 3 | 0.0 | 0 | 0 | 0 | 0.0 | 0 | 0 | 2 | 1 | 0 | 0 | 0 | 0 |
