= 2023 Chicago Bears season =

104th season in franchise history

- Owner: Virginia Halas McCaskey
- General manager: Ryan Poles
- Head coach: Matt Eberflus
- Home stadium: Soldier Field

Results
- Record: 7–10
- Division place: 4th NFC North
- Playoffs: Did not qualify
- All-Pros: CB Jaylon Johnson (2nd team)
- Pro Bowlers: CB Jaylon Johnson; DE Montez Sweat

Uniform
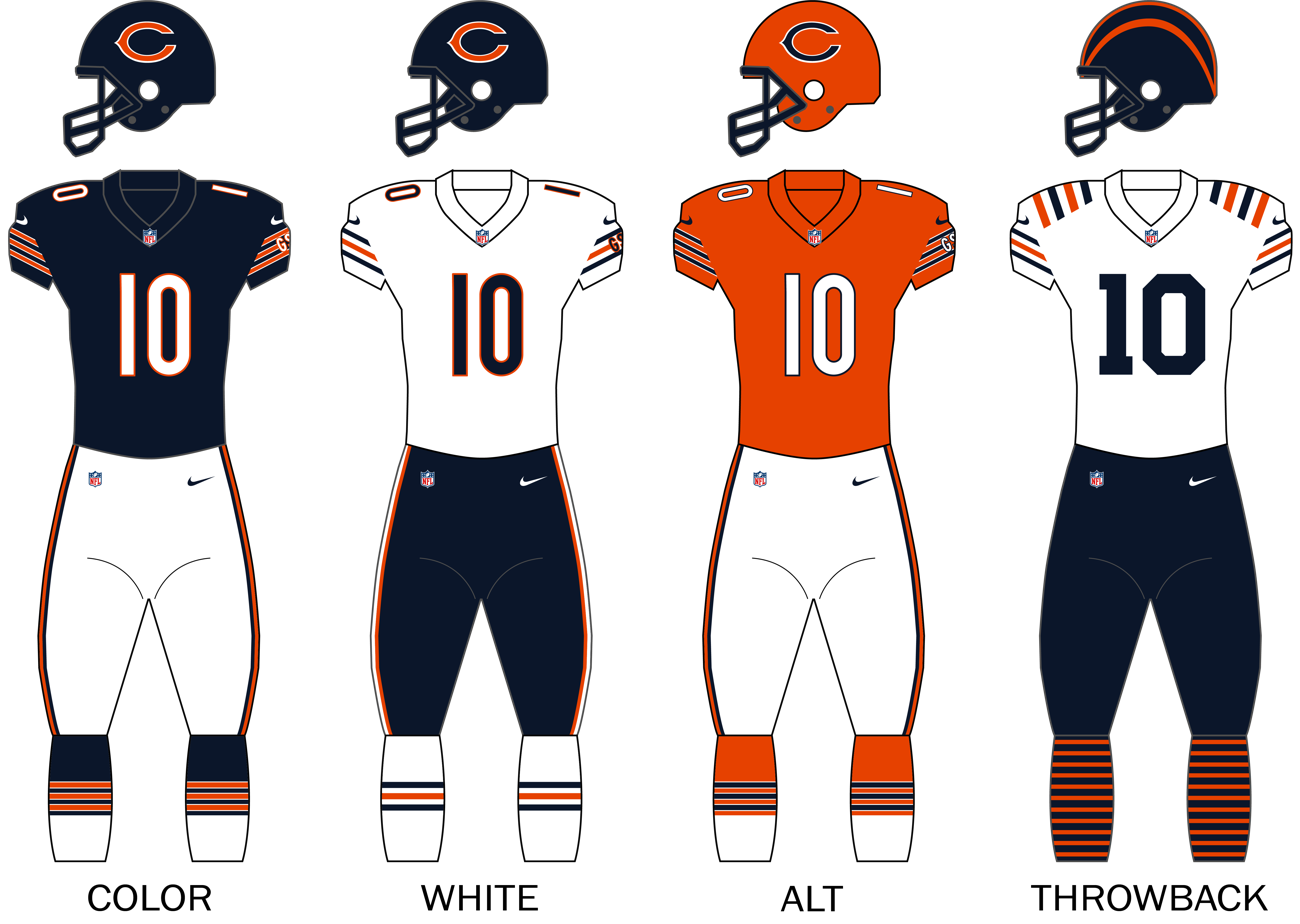

The 2023 season was the Chicago Bears' 104th season in the National Football League (NFL) and their second under the head coach/general manager tandem of Matt Eberflus and Ryan Poles.

Despite starting the season 0–4, and extending the team losing streak to 14 (longest in team history; dating back to the 2022 season), the Bears improved on their 3–14 record from the previous season after a Week 12 win over the Minnesota Vikings, and improved on their 6–11 record from the 2021 season after a Week 17 win against the Atlanta Falcons, although a Week 15 loss to the Cleveland Browns ensured their third consecutive losing season and fifth consecutive non-winning campaign. After the Carolina Panthers' loss to the Jacksonville Jaguars on New Year's Eve, they secured the first overall pick in the NFL draft for the second successive season. However, wins by the Los Angeles Rams and Green Bay Packers later that day eliminated the Bears from playoff contention for the third consecutive season. The Bears tied an NFL record for most blown double digit 4th quarter leads, at three.

During the season, Justin Fields became the fourth quarterback since the 1970 AFL-NFL merger to have 5,000 passing yards and 1,500 rushing yards in their first 30 starts. The Chicago Bears drew an average home attendance of 61,769 in 8 home games in the 2023 NFL season.

== Draft ==
2023 Chicago Bears draft selections
Round	Selection	Player	Position	College	Notes
1	1	Traded to the Carolina Panthers (Note: The Bears traded a first-round selection (1st overall) to the Carolina Panthers in exchange for first- and second-round selections (9th and 61st overall), a 2024 first-round selection, a 2025 second-round selection and WR D. J. Moore.)			
1	9	Traded to the Philadelphia Eagles (Note: The Bears traded a first-round selection (9th overall) to the Philadelphia Eagles in exchange for a first-round selection (10th overall) and a 2024 fourth-round selection.)			From Panthers
1	10	Darnell Wright	OT	Tennessee	From Saints via Eagles
2	32	Traded to the Pittsburgh Steelers (Note: The Bears traded a second-round selection (32nd overall) to the Pittsburgh Steelers in exchange for WR Chase Claypool.)			
2	53	Gervon Dexter	DT	Florida	From Ravens (Note: The Bears traded LB Roquan Smith to the Baltimore Ravens in exchange for second- and fifth-round selections (53rd and 158th overall), and LB A. J. Klein.)
2	56	Tyrique Stevenson	CB	Miami (FL)	From Jaguars (Note: The Bears traded second- and fifth-round selections (61st and 136th overall) to the Jacksonville Jaguars in exchange for a second-round selection (56th overall).)
2	61	Traded to the Jacksonville Jaguars			From 49ers via Panthers
3	64	Zacch Pickens	DT	South Carolina	
4	103	Traded to the New Orleans Saints (Note: The Bears traded a fourth-round selection (103rd overall) to the New Orleans Saints in exchange for fourth- and fifth-round selections (115th and 165th overall).)			
4	115	Roschon Johnson	RB	Texas	From Saints
4	133	Tyler Scott	WR	Cincinnati	From Eagles (Note: The Bears traded DE Robert Quinn to the Philadelphia Eagles in exchange for a fourth-round selection (133rd overall).)
5	136	Traded to the Jacksonville Jaguars			
5	148	Noah Sewell	LB	Oregon	From Patriots via Ravens
5	165	Terell Smith	CB	Minnesota	From Eagles via Saints
6	178	Traded to the Miami Dolphins (Note: The Bears traded a sixth-round selection (178th overall) to the Miami Dolphins in exchange for WR Jakeem Grant.)			
6	200	Traded to the Los Angeles Chargers (Note: The Bears traded a sixth-round selection (200th overall) to the Los Angeles Chargers in exchange for two 2022 seventh-round selections (254th and 255th overall).)			From Chargers (Note: The Bears traded LB Khalil Mack to the Los Angeles Chargers in exchange for a sixth-round selection (200th overall) and a 2022 second-round selection (48th overall).)
7	218	Travis Bell	DT	Kennesaw State	
7	258	Kendall Williamson	CB	Stanford	Supplemental compensatory selection

2023 Chicago Bears undrafted free agents
Name	Position	College	Ref.
Nick Amoah	OT	UC Davis	
Tyson Bagent	QB	Shepherd	
Micah Baskerville	LB	LSU	
Justin Broiles	S	Oklahoma	
Robert Burns	FB	UConn	
Damien Caffrey	TE	Stony Brook	
Macon Clark	S	Tulane	
Aron Cruickshank	WR	Rutgers	
Jalen Harris	DE	Arizona	
Robert Haskins	OT	USC	
Gabe Houy	OT	Pittsburgh	
D'Anthony Jones	DE	Houston	
Josh Lugg	G	Notre Dame	
Lorenz Metz	G	Cincinnati	
Thyrick Pitts	WR	Delaware	
Andre Szmyt	K	Syracuse	
Bralen Trahan	S	Louisiana	

Draft trades

== Staff ==
On February 1, 2023, the Bears announced that Jon Hoke was hired as their new cornerbacks coach and passing game coordinator, replacing James Rowe who left to become University of South Florida defensive passing game coordinator.

On September 20, 2023, Defensive Coordinator Alan Williams resigned, citing health and family concerns. According to multiple reports, the Bears’ human resources department was involved in the process that would lead up to Williams’ resignation as a result of inappropriate activity. On October 16, 2023, the Phil Snow was hired as their Defensive Analyst.

On November 1, 2023, Running backs coach David Walker was fired by the Bears over workplace behavior. Omar Young, the assistant quarterbacks and wide receivers coach, replaced him.

2023 Chicago Bears staff
Front office: Secretary of the board of directors – Virginia Halas McCaskey; Chairman – George McCaskey; President/CEO – Kevin Warren; General manager – Ryan Poles; Assistant general manager – Ian Cunningham; Senior vice president/general counsel – Cliff Stein; Co-director of player personnel – Jeff King; Co-director of player personnel – Trey Koziol; Assistant director of pro scouting – Chris White; Assistant director of college scouting – Breck Ackley; Director of football administration – Matt Feinstein; Director of football research – Harrison Fried; Director of football analytics – Krithi Chandrakasan; Head coaches: Head coach – Matt Eberflus; Offensive coaches: Offensive coordinator – Luke Getsy; Quarterbacks – Andrew Janocko; Running backs – David Walker; fired on November 1; Passing game coordinator/wide receivers – Tyke Tolbert; Tight ends – Jim Dray; Assistant tight ends – Tim Zetts; Offensive line – Chris Morgan; Assistant offensive line – Luke Steckel; Assistant Quarterbacks – Omar Young; Running backs coach from November 1; Offensive quality control – Zach Cable	Defensive coaches: Defensive coordinator – Alan Williams; resigned on September 20; Defensive line – Travis Smith; Assistant defensive line – Justin Hinds; Linebackers – Dave Borgonzi; Cornerbacks/passing game coordinator – Jon Hoke; Safeties – Andre Curtis; Assistant defensive backs – David Overstreet II; Senior defensive analyst – Phil Snow; Defensive quality control – Kevin Koch; Special teams coaches: Special teams coordinator – Richard Hightower; Assistant special teams – Carlos Polk; Coaching administration: Director of research and analysis – Harrison Freid; Chief of staff – Sean Magee; Coaching assistant – Kenny Norton III; Strength and conditioning: Head strength and conditioning – Jim Arthur; Assistant strength and conditioning – Noble Landry; Assistant strength and conditioning – Pierre Ngo; Player engagement/strength and conditioning – Isaiah Harris

== Final roster ==
2023 Chicago Bears roster
Quarterbacks (QB): 17 Tyson Bagent; 1 Justin Fields; 14 Nathan Peterman; Running backs (RB): 35 Khari Blasingame; 21 D'Onta Foreman; 24 Khalil Herbert; 20 Travis Homer; 23 Roschon Johnson; Wide receivers (WR): 80 Collin Johnson; 12 Velus Jones Jr.; 11 Darnell Mooney; 2 D. J. Moore; 13 Tyler Scott; 19 Equanimeous St. Brown; 15 Trent Taylor; Tight ends (TE): 85 Cole Kmet; 84 Marcedes Lewis; 18 Robert Tonyan	Offensive linemen (OL): 75 Larry Borom T; 69 Ja'Tyre Carter G; 64 Nate Davis G; 67 Dan Feeney C/G; 76 Teven Jenkins G; 70 Braxton Jones T; 65 Cody Whitehair G/C; 58 Darnell Wright T; Defensive linemen (DL): 97 Andrew Billings DT; 99 Gervon Dexter DT; 94 Rasheem Green DE; 93 Justin Jones DT; 96 Zacch Pickens DT; 90 Dominique Robinson DE; 98 Montez Sweat DE; 95 DeMarcus Walker DE	Linebackers (LB): 55 Dylan Cole MLB; 49 Tremaine Edmunds OLB; 53 T. J. Edwards OLB; 57 Jack Sanborn OLB; 44 Noah Sewell OLB; Defensive backs (DB): 39 Josh Blackwell CB; 9 Jaquan Brisker SS; 6 Kyler Gordon CB; 22 Elijah Hicks FS/SS; 4 Eddie Jackson FS; 33 Jaylon Johnson CB; 26 Quindell Johnson SS; 31 Jaylon Jones CB; 32 Terell Smith CB; 29 Tyrique Stevenson CB; 27 Greg Stroman CB; Special teams (ST): 16 Trenton Gill P; 8 Cairo Santos K; 48 Patrick Scales LS	Practice squad: 47 Micah Baskerville MLB; 45 Robert Burns FB; 88 Stephen Carlson TE; 63 Jerome Carvin G; 25 Adrian Colbert FS; 74 Aviante Collins T; 72 Michael Dwumfour DT; 92 Daniel Hardy DE; 52 Khalid Kareem DE; 68 Doug Kramer Jr. C; 46 Christian Matthew CB; 78 Roy Mbaeteka T (IPP); 60 Bill Murray G; 43 Matt Overton LS; 83 Nsimba Webster WR; 36 Kendall Williamson SS; Reserve: 91 Yannick Ngakoue DE (IR); 62 Lucas Patrick C (IR); Rookies in italics 53 active, 2 reserve, 16 practice squad

== Preseason ==
The Bears' preseason opponents and schedule was announced in the spring.

Week	Date	Opponent	Result	Record	Venue	Recap
1	August 12	Tennessee Titans	W 23–17	1–0	Soldier Field	Recap
2	August 19	at Indianapolis Colts	L 17–24	1–1	Lucas Oil Stadium	Recap
3	August 26	Buffalo Bills	L 21–24	1–2	Soldier Field	Recap

== Regular season ==
=== Schedule ===
Week	Date	Opponent	Result	Record	Venue	Recap
1	September 10	**Green Bay Packers**	**L** 20–38	0–1	Soldier Field	Recap
2	September 17	at Tampa Bay Buccaneers	**L** 17–27	0–2	Raymond James Stadium	Recap
3	September 24	at Kansas City Chiefs	**L** 10–41	0–3	Arrowhead Stadium	Recap
4	October 1	Denver Broncos	**L** 28–31	0–4	Soldier Field	Recap
5	October 5	at Washington Commanders	**W** 40–20	1–4	FedExField	Recap
6	October 15	**Minnesota Vikings**	**L** 13–19	1–5	Soldier Field	Recap
7	October 22	Las Vegas Raiders	**W** 30–12	2–5	Soldier Field	Recap
8	October 29	at Los Angeles Chargers	**L** 13–30	2–6	SoFi Stadium	Recap
9	November 5	at New Orleans Saints	**L** 17–24	2–7	Caesars Superdome	Recap
10	November 9	Carolina Panthers	**W** 16–13	3–7	Soldier Field	Recap
11	November 19	at **Detroit Lions**	**L** 26–31	3–8	Ford Field	Recap
12	November 27	at **Minnesota Vikings**	**W** 12–10	4–8	U.S. Bank Stadium	Recap
13	Bye					
14	December 10	**Detroit Lions**	**W** 28–13	5–8	Soldier Field	Recap
15	December 17	at Cleveland Browns	**L** 17–20	5–9	Cleveland Browns Stadium	Recap
16	December 24	Arizona Cardinals	**W** 27–16	6–9	Soldier Field	Recap
17	December 31	Atlanta Falcons	**W** 37–17	7–9	Soldier Field	Recap
18	January 7	at **Green Bay Packers**	**L** 9–17	7–10	Lambeau Field	Recap
Notes: * Intra-division opponents are in **bold** text

=== Game summaries ===
==== Week 1: vs. Green Bay Packers ====
Week 1: Green Bay Packers at Chicago Bears – Game summary

Quarter	1	2	3	4	Total
**Packers**	7	3	14	14	**38**
Bears	3	3	8	6	**20**

at Soldier Field, Chicago, Illinois

- Date: September 10
- Game time: 3:25 p.m. CDT
- Game weather: Mostly sunny, 75 °F (24 °C)
- Game attendance: 62,456
- Referee: Craig Wrolstad
- TV announcers (Fox): Kevin Burkhardt, Greg Olsen, Erin Andrews and Tom Rinaldi
- Recap, Game Book

Game information

**First quarter**

- GB – Romeo Doubs 8-yard pass from Jordan Love (Anders Carlson kick), 6:08. Packers 7–0. **Drive: 11 plays, 40 yards, 5:23.**
- CHI – Cairo Santos 47-yard field goal, 2:04. Packers 7–3. **Drive: 7 plays, 38 yards, 4:04.**

**Second quarter**

- CHI – Cairo Santos 29-yard field goal, 9:00. Packers 7–6. **Drive: 12 plays, 52 yards, 6:32.**
- GB – Anders Carlson 52-yard field goal, 0:00. Packers 10–6. **Drive: 6 plays, 22 yards, 1:12.**

**Third quarter**

- GB – Aaron Jones 1-yard run (Anders Carlson kick), 10:19. Packers 17–6 **Drive: 8 plays, 75 yards, 4:41.**
- GB – Aaron Jones 35-yard pass from Jordan Love (Anders Carlson kick), 6:26. Packers 24–6. **Drive: 4 plays, 42 yards, 1:39.**
- CHI – Darnell Mooney 20-yard pass from Justin Fields (Khalil Herbert run), 0:59. Packers 24–14. **Drive: 6 plays, 65 yards, 2:23.**

**Fourth quarter**

- GB – Romeo Doubs 4-yard pass from Jordan Love (Anders Carlson kick), 13:30. Packers 31–14. **Drive: 5 plays, 61 yards, 2:29.**
- GB – Quay Walker 37-yard interception return (Anders Carlson kick), 12:36. Packers 38–14.
- CHI – Roschon Johnson 2-yard run (pass failed), 2:54. Packers 38–20. **Drive: 14 plays, 69 yards, 3:24.**

**Top passers**

- GB – Jordan Love – 15/27, 245 yards, 3 TD
- CHI – Justin Fields – 24/37, 216 yards, TD, INT

**Top rushers**

- GB – Aaron Jones – 9 rushes, 41 yards, 2 TD
- CHI – Justin Fields – 9 rushes, 59 yards

**Top receivers**

- GB – Aaron Jones – 2 receptions, 86 yards, TD
- CHI – Darnell Mooney – 4 receptions, 53 yards, TD

The Bears lost to the Packers for the 9th straight time and the 14th time in the last 15 meetings.

==== Week 2: at Tampa Bay Buccaneers ====
Week 2: Chicago Bears at Tampa Bay Buccaneers – Game summary

Quarter	1	2	3	4	Total
Bears	7	3	0	7	**17**
**Buccaneers**	3	10	7	7	**27**

at Raymond James Stadium, Tampa, Florida

- Date: September 17
- Game time: 1:00 p.m. EDT/12:00 p.m. CDT
- Game weather: Cloudy, 89 °F (32 °C)
- Game attendance: 62,976
- Referee: Bill Vinovich
- TV announcers (Fox): Joe Davis, Daryl Johnston and Pam Oliver
- Recap, Game Book

Game information

**First quarter**

- TB – Chase McLaughlin 26-yard field goal, 9:03. Buccaneers 3–0. **Drive: 12 plays, 67 yards, 5:57.**
- CHI – Justin Fields 1-yard run (Cairo Santos kick), 6:17. Bears 7–3. **Drive: 6 plays, 75 yards, 2:46.**

**Second quarter**

- TB – Rachaad White 4-yard run (Chase McLaughlin kick), 10:53. Buccaneers 10–7. **Drive: 4 plays, 77 yards, 2:22.**
- CHI – Cairo Santos 52-yard field goal, 1:55. Tied 10–10. **Drive: 10 plays, 46 yards, 4:54.**
- TB – Chase McLaughlin 25-yard field goal, 0:00. Buccaneers 13–10. **Drive: 12 plays, 69 yards, 1:55.**

**Third quarter**

- TB – Mike Evans 32-yard pass from Baker Mayfield (Chase McLaughlin kick), 4:06. Buccaneers 20–10 **Drive: 12 plays, 89 yards, 7:25.**

**Fourth quarter**

- CHI – Chase Claypool 20-yard pass from Justin Fields (Cairo Santos kick), 6:17. Buccaneers 20–17. **Drive: 8 plays, 90 yards, 3:53.**
- TB – Shaquil Barrett 4-yard interception return (Chase McLaughlin kick), 2:03. Buccaneers 27–17.

**Top passers**

- CHI – Justin Fields – 16/29, 211 yards, TD, 2 INT
- TB – Baker Mayfield – 26/34, 317 yards, TD

**Top rushers**

- CHI – Khalil Herbert – 7 rushes, 35 yards
- TB – Rachaad White – 17 rushes, 73 yards, TD

**Top receivers**

- CHI – D. J. Moore – 6 receptions, 104 yards
- TB – Mike Evans – 6 receptions, 171 yards, TD

==== Week 3: at Kansas City Chiefs ====
Week 3: Chicago Bears at Kansas City Chiefs – Game summary

Quarter	1	2	3	4	Total
Bears	0	0	0	10	**10**
**Chiefs**	7	27	7	0	**41**

at Arrowhead Stadium, Kansas City, Missouri

- Date: September 24
- Game time: 3:25 p.m. CDT
- Game weather: 82 °F (28 °C)
- Game attendance: 73,562
- Referee: Alan Eck
- TV announcers (Fox): Kevin Burkhardt, Greg Olsen, Erin Andrews and Tom Rinaldi
- Recap, Game Book

Game information

**First quarter**

- KC – Jerick McKinnon 6-yard pass from Patrick Mahomes (Harrison Butker kick), 6:51. Chiefs 7–0. **Drive: 6 plays, 59 yards, 2:45.**

**Second quarter**

- KC – Clyde Edwards-Helaire 1-yard run (Harrison Butker kick), 11:34. Chiefs 14–0. **Drive: 11 plays, 80 yards, 5:57.**
- KC – Jerick McKinnon 3-yard pass from Patrick Mahomes (Harrison Butker kick), 3:05. Chiefs 21–0. **Drive: 11 plays, 88 yards, 5:24.**
- KC – Harrison Butker 41-yard field goal, 1:51. Chiefs 24–0. **Drive: 4 plays, 3 yards, 1:06.**
- KC – Isiah Pacheco 1-yard run (Harrison Butker kick), 1:06. Chiefs 31–0. **Drive: 3 plays, 26 yards, 0:31.**
- KC – Harrison Butker 38-yard field goal, 0:00. Chiefs 34–0. **Drive: 5 plays, 45 yards, 0:35.**

**Third quarter**

- KC – Travis Kelce 3-yard pass from Patrick Mahomes (Harrison Butker kick), 7:04. Chiefs 41–0. **Drive: 11 plays, 64 yards, 5:14.**

**Fourth quarter**

- CHI – Cairo Santos 21-yard field goal, 13:34. Chiefs 41–3. **Drive: 11 plays, 25 yards, 4:42.**
- CHI – D. J. Moore 9-yard pass from Justin Fields (Cairo Santos kick), 4:20. Chiefs 41–10. **Drive: 9 plays, 75 yards, 2:49.**

**Top passers**

- CHI – Justin Fields – 11/22, 99 yards, TD, INT
- KC – Patrick Mahomes – 24/33, 272 yards, 3 TD

**Top rushers**

- CHI – Justin Fields – 11 rushes, 47 yards
- KC – Isiah Pacheco – 15 rushes, 62 yards, TD

**Top receivers**

- CHI – D. J. Moore – 3 receptions, 41 yards, TD
- KC – Travis Kelce – 7 receptions, 69 yards, TD

==== Week 4: vs. Denver Broncos ====
Week 4: Denver Broncos at Chicago Bears – Game summary

Quarter	1	2	3	4	Total
**Broncos**	7	0	7	17	**31**
Bears	0	21	7	0	**28**

at Soldier Field, Chicago, Illinois

- Date: October 1
- Game time: 12:00 p.m. CDT
- Game weather: Sunny, 80 °F (27 °C)
- Game attendance: 62,220
- Referee: Carl Cheffers
- TV announcers (CBS): Andrew Catalon, Tiki Barber, Matt Ryan and AJ Ross
- Recap, Game Book

Game information

**First quarter**

- DEN – Jaleel McLaughlin 18-yard pass from Russell Wilson (Wil Lutz kick), 5:08. Broncos 7-0. **Drive: 11 plays, 84 yards, 6:12.**

**Second quarter**

- CHI – D.J. Moore 29-yard pass from Justin Fields (Cairo Santos kick), 14:53. Tied 7-7. **Drive: 9 plays, 75 yards, 5:15.**
- CHI – Cole Kmet 22-yard pass from Justin Fields (Cairo Santos kick), 11:44. Bears 14-7. **Drive: 3 plays, 44 yards, 1:16.**
- CHI – Cole Kmet 3-yard pass from Justin Fields (Cairo Santos kick), 6:08. Bears 21-7. **Drive: 5 plays, 85 yards, 2:27.**

**Third quarter**

- CHI – Khalil Herbert 2-yard pass from Justin Fields (Cairo Santos kick), 4:11. Bears 28-7. **Drive: 15 plays, 66 yards, 9:26.**
- DEN – Brandon Johnson 4-yard pass from Russell Wilson (Wil Lutz kick), 0:14. Bears 28-14. **Drive: 7 plays, 75 yards, 3:57.**

**Fourth quarter**

- DEN – Courtland Sutton 13-yard pass from Russell Wilson (Wil Lutz kick), 9:36. Bears 28-21. **Drive: 10 plays, 66 yards, 4:20.**
- DEN – Jonathon Cooper 35-yard fumble return (Wil Lutz kick), 6:55. Tied 28-28.
- DEN – Wil Lutz 51-yard field goal, 1:46. Broncos 31-28. **Drive: 5 plays, 48 yards, 1:06.**

**Top passers**

- DEN – Russell Wilson – 21/28, 223 yards, 3 TD
- CHI – Justin Fields – 28/35, 335 yards, 4 TD, INT

**Top rushers**

- DEN – Jaleel McLaughlin – 7 rushes, 72 yards
- CHI – Khalil Herbert – 18 rushes, 103 yards

**Top receivers**

- DEN – Jerry Jeudy – 3 receptions, 52 yards
- CHI – D.J. Moore – 8 receptions, 131 yards, TD

The Bears blew a 28–7 lead and lost to Russell Wilson and the Broncos, 31–28. The blown 21-point lead tied for the largest in Bears history. The Bears remained winless and extended their losing streak to 14 games.

==== Week 5: at Washington Commanders ====
Week 5: Chicago Bears at Washington Commanders – Game summary

Quarter	1	2	3	4	Total
**Bears**	10	17	0	13	**40**
Commanders	0	3	11	6	**20**

at FedExField, Landover, Maryland

- Date: October 5
- Game time: 8:15 p.m. EDT/7:15 p.m. CDT
- Game weather: Cloudy, 70 °F (21 °C)
- Game attendance: 63,727
- Referee: Scott Novak
- TV announcers (WFLD/Prime Video): Al Michaels, Kirk Herbstreit and Kaylee Hartung
- Recap, Game Book

Game information

**First quarter**

- CHI – D. J. Moore 20-yard pass from Justin Fields (Cairo Santos kick), 12:04. Bears 7–0. **Drive: 6 plays, 75 yards, 2:56.**
- CHI – Cairo Santos 20-yard field goal, 4:18. Bears 10–0. **Drive: 11 plays, 70 yards, 5:33.**

**Second quarter**

- CHI – D. J. Moore 11-yard pass from Justin Fields (Cairo Santos kick), 14:15. Bears 17–0. **Drive: 6 plays, 69 yards, 2:37.**
- WAS – Joey Slye 51-yard field goal, 8:33. Bears 17–3. **Drive: 11 plays, 42 yards, 5:42.**
- CHI – Cairo Santos 36-yard field goal, 2:24. Bears 20–3. **Drive: 13 plays, 57 yards, 6:09.**
- CHI – Cole Kmet 4-yard pass from Justin Fields (Cairo Santos kick), 00:24. Bears 27–3. **Drive: 6 plays, 36 yards, 1:55.**

**Third quarter**

- WAS – Logan Thomas 2-yard pass from Sam Howell (Sam Howell run), 12:00. Bears 27–11. **Drive: 5 plays, 75 yards, 3:00.**
- WAS – Joey Slye 32-yard field goal, 3:17. Bears 27–14. **Drive: 7 plays, 70 yards, 4:23.**

**Fourth quarter**

- CHI – Cairo Santos 43-yard field goal, 14:09. Bears 30–14. **Drive: 8 plays, 50 yards, 4:08.**
- WAS – Curtis Samuel 3-yard pass from Sam Howell (pass failed), 10:51. Bears 30–20. **Drive: 12 plays, 75 yards, 3:18.**
- CHI – D. J. Moore 56-yard pass from Justin Fields (Cairo Santos kick), 4:09. Bears 37–20. **Drive: 3 plays, 64 yards, 1:02.**
- CHI – Cairo Santos 37-yard field goal, 1:56. Bears 40–20. **Drive: 4 plays, 7 yards, 0:34.**

**Top passers**

- CHI – Justin Fields – 15/29, 282 yards, 4 TD
- WAS – Sam Howell – 37/51, 388 yards, 2 TD, INT

**Top rushers**

- CHI – Khalil Herbert – 10 rushes, 76 yards
- WAS – Sam Howell – 4 rushes, 19 yards

**Top receivers**

- CHI – D. J. Moore – 8 receptions, 230 yards, 3 TD
- WAS – Logan Thomas – 9 receptions, 77 yards, TD

Only a few hours after the death of team legend Dick Butkus, the Bears upset the Commanders, and picked up their first win of the season, improving to 1–4. Justin Fields had a perfect passer rating of 158.3 when he threw to D. J. Moore, and D. J. Moore had a day with 230 yards receiving and 3 touchdowns. They broke their losing streak of 14 games dating back to last season.

==== Week 6: vs. Minnesota Vikings ====
Week 6: Minnesota Vikings at Chicago Bears – Game summary

Quarter	1	2	3	4	Total
**Vikings**	3	9	7	0	**19**
Bears	0	6	0	7	**13**

at Soldier Field, Chicago, Illinois

- Date: October 15
- Game time: 12:00 p.m. CDT
- Game weather: Partly cloudy, 53 °F (12 °C)
- Game attendance: 62,167
- Referee: Brad Allen
- TV announcers (Fox): Brandon Gaudin, Robert Smith and Jen Hale
- Recap, Game Book

Game information

**First quarter**

- MIN – Greg Joseph 53-yard field goal, 6:24. Vikings 3–0. **Drive: 9 plays, 33 yards, 4:47.**

**Second quarter**

- CHI – Cairo Santos 22-yard field goal, 13:41. Tied 3–3. **Drive: 14 plays, 71 yards, 7:43.**
- MIN – Greg Joseph 51-yard field goal, 8:56. Vikings 6–3. **Drive: 9 plays, 42 yards, 4:45.**
- CHI – Cairo Santos 53-yard field goal, 3:18. Tied 6–6. **Drive: 5 plays, 45 yards, 2:48.**
- MIN – Jordan Addison 10-yard pass from Kirk Cousins (kick blocked), 0:12. Vikings 12–6. **Drive: 8 plays, 77 yards, 1:35.**

**Third quarter**

- MIN – Jordan Hicks 42-yard fumble return (Greg Joseph kick), 6:44. Vikings 19–6.

**Fourth quarter**

- CHI – Tyson Bagent 1-yard run (Cairo Santos kick), 7:46. Vikings 19–13. **Drive: 9 plays, 77 yards, 4:56.**

**Top passers**

- MIN – Kirk Cousins – 21/31, 181 yards, TD
- CHI – Tyson Bagent – 10/14, 83 yards, INT

**Top rushers**

- MIN – Alexander Mattison – 18 rushes, 44 yards
- CHI – D'Onta Foreman – 15 rushes, 65 yards

**Top receivers**

- MIN – T. J. Hockenson – 6 receptions, 50 yards
- CHI – D. J. Moore – 5 receptions, 51 yards

==== Week 7: vs. Las Vegas Raiders ====
Week 7: Las Vegas Raiders at Chicago Bears – Game summary

Quarter	1	2	3	4	Total
Raiders	0	3	0	9	**12**
**Bears**	7	7	7	9	**30**

at Soldier Field, Chicago, Illinois

- Date: October 22
- Game time: 12:00 p.m. CDT
- Game weather: Partly cloudy, 52 °F (11 °C)
- Game attendance: 62,199
- Referee: Clay Martin
- TV announcers (Fox): Kevin Kugler, Mark Sanchez and Laura Okmin
- Recap, Game Book

Game information

**First quarter**

- CHI – D'Onta Foreman 2-yard run (Cairo Santos kick), 3:45. Bears 7–0. **Drive: 12 plays, 69 yards, 6:22.**

**Second quarter**

- CHI – D'Onta Foreman 3-yard run (Cairo Santos kick), 7:31. Bears 14–0. **Drive: 6 plays, 34 yards, 2:48.**
- LV – Daniel Carlson 40-yard field goal, 1:47. Bears 14–3. **Drive: 13 plays, 54 yards, 5:44.**

**Third quarter**

- CHI – D'Onta Foreman 5-yard pass from Tyson Bagent (Cairo Santos kick), 4:04. Bears 21–3. **Drive: 15 plays, 88 yards, 8:16.**

**Fourth quarter**

- LV – Daniel Carlson 25-yard field goal, 12:20. Bears 21–6. **Drive: 15 plays, 69 yards, 6:44.**
- CHI – Cairo Santos 54-yard field goal, 5:46. Bears 24–6. **Drive: 12 plays, 37 yards, 6:34.**
- CHI – Jaylon Johnson 39-yard interception return (kick blocked), 5:36. Bears 30–6.
- LV – Jakobi Meyers 9-yard pass from Aidan O'Connell (pass failed), 1:10. Bears 30–12. **Drive: 8 plays, 60 yards, 2:22.**

**Top passers**

- LV – Brian Hoyer – 17/32, 129 yards, 2 INT
- CHI – Tyson Bagent – 21/29, 162 yards, TD

**Top rushers**

- LV – Josh Jacobs – 11 rushes, 35 yards
- CHI – D'Onta Foreman – 16 rushes, 89 yards, 2 TD

**Top receivers**

- LV – Davante Adams – 7 receptions, 57 yards
- CHI – D. J. Moore – 8 receptions, 54 yards

==== Week 8: at Los Angeles Chargers ====
Week 8: Chicago Bears at Los Angeles Chargers – Game summary

Quarter	1	2	3	4	Total
Bears	0	7	0	6	**13**
**Chargers**	14	10	6	0	**30**

at SoFi Stadium, Inglewood, California

- Date: October 29
- Game time: 7:20 p.m. CDT/5:20 p.m. PDT
- Game weather: Clear, 76 °F (24 °C) (retractable roof open)
- Game attendance: 70,240
- Referee: Brad Rogers
- TV announcers (NBC): Mike Tirico, Cris Collinsworth and Melissa Stark
- Recap, Game Book

Game information

**First quarter**

- LAC – Austin Ekeler 39-yard pass from Justin Herbert (Cameron Dicker kick), 7:08. Chargers 7–0. **Drive: 10 plays, 92 yards, 5:36.**
- LAC – Simi Fehoko 9-yard pass from Justin Herbert (Cameron Dicker kick), 0:43. Chargers 14–0. **Drive: 9 plays, 55 yards, 4:18.**

**Second quarter**

- LAC – Cameron Dicker 43-yard field goal, 8:50. Chargers 17–0. **Drive: 8 plays, 32 yards, 3:55.**
- CHI – Darrynton Evans 11-yard run (Cairo Santos kick), 1:47. Chargers 17–7. **Drive: 14 plays, 75 yards, 7:03.**
- LAC – Donald Parham 11-yard pass from Justin Herbert (Cameron Dicker kick), 0:04. Chargers 24–7. **Drive: 9 plays, 75 yards, 1:43.**

**Third quarter**

- LAC – Cameron Dicker 53-yard field goal, 8:51. Chargers 27–7. **Drive: 10 plays, 40 yards, 6:09.**
- LAC – Cameron Dicker 46-yard field goal, 3:00. Chargers 30–7. **Drive: 4 plays, 1 yard, 0:52.**

**Fourth quarter**

- CHI – Tyson Bagent 1-yard run (pass failed), 2:12. Chargers 30–13. **Drive: 10 plays, 41 yards, 4:02.**

**Top passers**

- CHI – Tyson Bagent – 25/37, 232 yards, 2 INT
- LAC – Justin Herbert – 31/40, 298 yards, 3 TD

**Top rushers**

- CHI – D'Onta Foreman – 9 rushes, 34 yards
- LAC – Austin Ekeler – 15 rushes, 29 yards

**Top receivers**

- CHI – Cole Kmet – 10 receptions, 79 yards
- LAC – Austin Ekeler – 7 receptions, 94 yards, TD

==== Week 9: at New Orleans Saints ====
Week 9: Chicago Bears at New Orleans Saints – Game summary

Quarter	1	2	3	4	Total
Bears	7	7	3	0	**17**
**Saints**	7	7	3	7	**24**

at Caesars Superdome, New Orleans, Louisiana

- Date: November 5
- Game time: 12:00 p.m. CST
- Game weather: None (indoor stadium)
- Game attendance: 70,006
- Referee: Ronald Torbert
- TV announcers (CBS): Andrew Catalon, Tiki Barber, Matt Ryan and AJ Ross
- Recap, Game Book

Game information

**First quarter**

- CHI – Cole Kmet 18-yard pass from Tyson Bagent (Cairo Santos kick), 11:21. Bears 7–0. **Drive: 9 plays, 75 yards, 3:39.**
- NO – Chris Olave 8-yard pass from Derek Carr (Blake Grupe kick), 0:44. Tied 7–7. **Drive: 10 plays, 45 yards, 5:04.**

**Second quarter**

- CHI – Cole Kmet 9-yard pass from Tyson Bagent (Cairo Santos kick), 12:52. Bears 14–7. **Drive: 6 plays, 75 yards, 2:52.**
- NO – Taysom Hill 2-yard pass from Derek Carr (Blake Grupe kick), 6:05. Tied 14–14. **Drive: 11 plays, 75 yards, 6:47.**

**Third quarter**

- NO – Blake Grupe 55-yard field goal, 11:43. Saints 17–14. **Drive: 4 plays, 2 yards, 1:16.**
- CHI – Cairo Santos 31-yard field goal, 3:27. Tied 17–17. **Drive: 13 plays, 62 yards, 8:16.**

**Fourth quarter**

- NO – Juwan Johnson 3-yard pass from Taysom Hill (Blake Grupe kick), 11:05. Saints 24–17. **Drive: 5 plays, 47 yards, 2:54.**

**Top passers**

- CHI – Tyson Bagent – 18/30, 220 yards, 2 TD, 3 INT
- NO – Derek Carr – 25/34, 211 yards, 2 TD

**Top rushers**

- CHI – D'Onta Foreman – 20 rushes, 83 yards
- NO – Taysom Hill – 11 rushes, 52 yards

**Top receivers**

- CHI – Cole Kmet – 6 receptions, 46 yards, TD
- NO – Chris Olave – 6 receptions, 46 yards, TD

==== Week 10: vs. Carolina Panthers ====
Week 10: Carolina Panthers at Chicago Bears – Game summary

Quarter	1	2	3	4	Total
Panthers	7	3	0	3	**13**
**Bears**	3	6	7	0	**16**

at Soldier Field, Chicago, Illinois

- Date: November 9
- Game time: 7:15 p.m. CST
- Game weather: Clear, 51 °F (11 °C)
- Game attendance: 61,200
- Referee: Clete Blakeman
- TV announcers (WFLD/Prime Video): Al Michaels, Kirk Herbstreit and Kaylee Hartung
- Recap, Game Book

Game information

**First quarter**

- CAR – Ihmir Smith-Marsette 79-yard punt return (Eddy Piñeiro kick), 5:46. Panthers 7–0.
- CHI – Cairo Santos 54-yard field goal, 2:29. Panthers 7–3. **Drive: 8 plays, 39 yards, 3:17.**

**Second quarter**

- CAR – Eddy Piñeiro 33-yard field goal, 13:33. Panthers 10–3. **Drive: 8 plays, 60 yards, 3:56.**
- CHI – Cairo Santos 36-yard field goal, 3:06. Panthers 10–6. **Drive: 11 plays, 35 yards, 5:13.**
- CHI – Cairo Santos 39-yard field goal, 0:00. Panthers 10–9. **Drive: 9 plays, 70 yards, 1:12.**

**Third quarter**

- CHI – D'Onta Foreman 4-yard run (Cairo Santos kick), 6:33. Bears 16–10. **Drive: 9 plays, 38 yards, 3:56.**

**Fourth quarter**

- CAR – Eddy Piñeiro 39-yard field goal, 11:06. Bears 16–13. **Drive: 8 plays, 20 yards, 4:42.**

**Top passers**

- CAR – Bryce Young – 21/38, 185 yards
- CHI – Tyson Bagent – 20/33, 162 yards

**Top rushers**

- CAR – Chuba Hubbard – 9 rushes, 23 yards
- CHI – D'Onta Foreman – 21 rushes, 80 yards, TD

**Top receivers**

- CAR – Adam Thielen – 6 receptions, 42 yards
- CHI – D. J. Moore – 5 receptions, 58 yards

==== Week 11: at Detroit Lions ====
Week 11: Chicago Bears at Detroit Lions – Game summary

Quarter	1	2	3	4	Total
Bears	7	3	10	6	**26**
**Lions**	0	14	0	17	**31**

at Ford Field, Detroit, Michigan

- Date: November 19
- Game time: 1:00 p.m. EST/12:00 p.m. CST
- Game weather: None (indoor stadium)
- Game attendance: 63,873
- Referee: Scott Novak
- TV announcers (Fox): Adam Amin, Mark Schlereth and Kristina Pink
- Recap, Game Book

Game information

**First quarter**

- CHI – D'Onta Foreman 1-yard run (Cairo Santos kick), 9:23. Bears 7–0. **Drive: 10 plays, 75 yards, 5:37.**

**Second quarter**

- DET – Jahmyr Gibbs 2-yard run (Riley Patterson kick), 9:23. Tied 7–7. **Drive: 8 plays, 34 yards, 3:55.**
- CHI – Cairo Santos 31-yard field goal, 1:47. Bears 10–7. **Drive: 15 plays, 62 yards, 7:36.**
- DET – Amon-Ra St. Brown 7-yard pass from Jared Goff (Riley Patterson kick), 0:11. Lions 14–10. **Drive: 10 plays, 75 yards, 1:36.**

**Third quarter**

- CHI – Cairo Santos 53-yard field goal, 6:41. Lions 14–13. **Drive: 10 plays, 50 yards, 6:21.**
- CHI – D. J. Moore 39-yard pass from Justin Fields (Cairo Santos kick), 4:41. Bears 20–14. **Drive: 3 plays, 40 yards, 1:51.**

**Fourth quarter**

- CHI – Cairo Santos 40-yard field goal, 14:12. Bears 23–14. **Drive: 7 plays, 20 yards, 3:13.**
- CHI – Cairo Santos 39-yard field goal, 4:15. Bears 26–14. **Drive: 14 plays, 70 yards, 8:45.**
- DET – Jameson Williams 32-yard pass from Jared Goff (Riley Patterson kick), 2:59. Bears 26–21. **Drive: 6 plays, 75 yards, 1:16.**
- DET – David Montgomery 1-yard run (Jared Goff–Sam LaPorta pass), 0:29. Lions 29–26. **Drive: 11 plays, 73 yards, 2:04.**
- DET – Justin Fields forced fumble out of bounds by Aidan Hutchinson for a Safety, 0:22. Lions 31–26.

**Top passers**

- CHI – Justin Fields – 16/23, 169 yards, TD
- DET – Jared Goff – 23/35, 236 yards, 2 TD, 3 INT

**Top rushers**

- CHI – Justin Fields – 18 rushes, 104 yards
- DET – David Montgomery – 12 rushes, 76 yards, TD

**Top receivers**

- CHI – D. J. Moore – 7 receptions, 96 yards, TD
- DET – Amon-Ra St. Brown – 8 receptions, 77 yards, TD

The Bears became the first team in history to lose a game while having possession for over 40 minutes, with the Lions coming back from a 12-point deficit with just 4 minutes and 15 seconds on the clock.

==== Week 12: at Minnesota Vikings ====
Week 12: Chicago Bears at Minnesota Vikings – Game summary

Quarter	1	2	3	4	Total
**Bears**	0	3	3	6	**12**
Vikings	0	3	0	7	**10**

at U.S. Bank Stadium, Minneapolis, Minnesota

- Date: November 27
- Game time: 7:15 p.m. CST
- Game weather: None (indoor stadium)
- Game attendance: 66,843
- Referee: Alex Kemp
- TV announcers (ESPN/ABC): Joe Buck, Troy Aikman and Lisa Salters
- Recap, Game Book

Game information

**First quarter**

- No scoring plays.

**Second quarter**

- CHI – Cairo Santos 25-yard field goal, 13:35. Bears 3–0. **Drive: 10 plays, 67 yards, 5:39.**
- MIN – Greg Joseph 34-yard field goal, 0:00. Tied 3–3. **Drive: 7 plays, 64 yards, 1:51.**

**Third quarter**

- CHI – Cairo Santos 39-yard field goal, 6:59. Bears 6–3. **Drive: 10 plays, 34 yards, 5:08.**

**Fourth quarter**

- CHI – Cairo Santos 55-yard field goal, 14:15. Bears 9–3. **Drive: 8 plays, 32 yards, 3:24.**
- MIN – T. J. Hockenson 17-yard pass from Joshua Dobbs (Greg Joseph kick), 5:54. Vikings 10–9. **Drive: 8 plays, 77 yards, 3:52.**
- CHI – Cairo Santos 30-yard field goal, 0:10. Bears 12–10. **Drive: 10 plays, 66 yards, 2:19.**

**Top passers**

- CHI – Justin Fields – 27/37, 217 yards
- MIN – Joshua Dobbs – 22/32, 185 yards, TD, 4 INT

**Top rushers**

- CHI – Justin Fields – 12 rushes, 59 yards
- MIN – Alexander Mattison – 10 rushes, 52 yards

**Top receivers**

- CHI – D. J. Moore – 11 receptions, 114 yards
- MIN – Jordan Addison – 6 receptions, 39 yards

==== Week 14: vs. Detroit Lions ====
Week 14: Detroit Lions at Chicago Bears – Game summary

Quarter	1	2	3	4	Total
Lions	0	13	0	0	**13**
**Bears**	10	0	9	9	**28**

at Soldier Field, Chicago, Illinois

- Date: December 10
- Game time: 12:00 p.m. CST
- Game weather: Cloudy, 36 °F (2 °C)
- Game attendance: 62,185
- Referee: Tra Blake
- TV announcers (Fox): Adam Amin, Mark Schlereth and Kristina Pink
- Recap, Game Book

Game information

**First quarter**

- CHI – D. J. Moore 16-yard run (Cairo Santos kick), 10:17. Bears 7–0. **Drive: 8 plays, 69 yards, 4:43.**
- CHI – Cairo Santos 46-yard field goal, 1:22. Bears 10–0. **Drive: 10 plays, 63 yards, 5:12.**

**Second quarter**

- DET – Jahmyr Gibbs 12-yard run (kick failed), 6:59. Bears 10–6. **Drive: 9 plays, 61 yards, 4:40.**
- DET – Josh Reynolds 8-yard pass from Jared Goff (Riley Patterson kick), 0:26. Lions 13–10. **Drive: 11 plays, 53 yards, 4:49.**

**Third quarter**

- CHI – Cairo Santos 25-yard field goal, 8:38. Tied 13–13. **Drive: 12 plays, 65 yards, 5:20.**
- CHI – D. J. Moore 38-yard pass from Justin Fields (kick failed), 1:36. Bears 19–13. **Drive: 7 plays, 50 yards, 2:30.**

**Fourth quarter**

- CHI – Justin Fields 11-yard run (pass failed), 14:12. Bears 25–13. **Drive: 5 plays, 29 yards, 1:48.**
- CHI – Cairo Santos 28-yard field goal, 9:20. Bears 28–13. **Drive: 7 plays, 20 yards, 2:53.**

**Top passers**

- DET – Jared Goff – 20/35, 161 yards, TD, 2 INT
- CHI – Justin Fields – 19/33, 223 yards, TD

**Top rushers**

- DET – Jahmyr Gibbs – 11 rushes, 66 yards, TD
- CHI – Justin Fields – 12 rushes, 58 yards, TD

**Top receivers**

- DET – Josh Reynolds – 3 receptions, 44 yards, TD
- CHI – D. J. Moore – 6 receptions, 68 yards, TD

==== Week 15: at Cleveland Browns ====
Week 15: Chicago Bears at Cleveland Browns – Game summary

Quarter	1	2	3	4	Total
Bears	0	7	10	0	**17**
**Browns**	0	7	0	13	**20**

at Cleveland Browns Stadium, Cleveland, Ohio

- Date: December 17
- Game time: 1:00 p.m. EST/12:00 p.m. CST
- Game weather: Rain, 45 °F (7 °C)
- Game attendance: 67,919
- Referee: Brad Allen
- TV announcers (Fox): Kevin Kugler, Mark Sanchez and Laura Okmin
- Recap, Game Book

Game information

**First quarter**

- No scoring plays.

**Second quarter**

- CHI – Cole Kmet 5-yard pass from Justin Fields (Cairo Santos kick), 10:54. Bears 7–0. **Drive: 4 plays, 1 yard, 2:23.**
- CLE – David Njoku 2-yard pass from Joe Flacco (Dustin Hopkins kick), 3:48. Tied 7–7. **Drive: 12 plays, 84 yards, 7:06.**

**Third quarter**

- CHI – Tremaine Edmunds 45-yard interception return (Cairo Santos kick), 13:50. Bears 14–7.
- CHI – Cairo Santos 41-yard field goal, 7:07. Bears 17–7. **Drive: 9 plays, 47 yards, 4:38.**

**Fourth quarter**

- CLE – Dustin Hopkins 33-yard field goal, 12:27. Bears 17–10. **Drive: 6 plays, 52 yards, 2:29.**
- CLE – Amari Cooper 51-yard pass from Joe Flacco (Dustin Hopkins kick), 3:08. Tied 17–17. **Drive: 6 plays, 80 yards, 2:10.**
- CLE – Dustin Hopkins 34-yard field goal, 0:32. Browns 20–17. **Drive: 8 plays, 63 yard, 1:18.**

**Top passers**

- CHI – Justin Fields – 19/40, 166 yards, TD, 2 INT
- CLE – Joe Flacco – 28/44, 374 yards, 2 TD, 3 INT

**Top rushers**

- CHI – Roschon Johnson – 5 rushes, 36 yards
- CLE – Jerome Ford – 8 rushes, 20 yards

**Top receivers**

- CHI – Cole Kmet – 5 receptions, 23 yards, TD
- CLE – David Njoku – 10 receptions, 104 yards, TD

==== Week 16: vs. Arizona Cardinals ====
Week 16: Arizona Cardinals at Chicago Bears – Game summary

Quarter	1	2	3	4	Total
Cardinals	0	7	3	6	**16**
**Bears**	7	14	3	3	**27**

at Soldier Field, Chicago, Illinois

- Date: December 24
- Game time: 3:25 p.m. CST
- Game weather: Mostly cloudy, 52 °F (11 °C)
- Game attendance: 59,978
- Referee: John Hussey
- TV announcers (Fox): Kevin Kugler, Mark Sanchez and Laura Okmin
- Recap, Game Book

Game information

**First quarter**

- CHI – Justin Fields 3-yard run (Cairo Santos kick), 6:16. Bears 7–0. **Drive: 6 plays, 74 yard, 2:56.**

**Second quarter**

- CHI – Khalil Herbert 11-yard run (Cairo Santos kick), 12:54. Bears 14–0. **Drive: 11 plays, 90 yard, 5:57.**
- CHI – Marcedes Lewis 1-yard pass from Justin Fields (Cairo Santos kick), 7:12. Bears 21–0. **Drive: 8 plays, 54 yards, 4:41.**
- ARI – James Conner 16-yard pass from Kyler Murray (Matt Prater kick), 2:27. Bears 21–7. **Drive: 9 plays, 75 yards, 4:45.**

**Third quarter**

- ARI – Matt Prater 55-yard field goal, 12:12. Bears 21–10. **Drive: 5 plays, 20 yards, 2:48.**
- CHI – Cairo Santos 49-yard field goal, 1:04. Bears 24–10. **Drive: 10 plays, 49 yards, 5:35.**

**Fourth quarter**

- ARI – Greg Dortch 38-yard pass from Kyler Murray (pass failed), 6:37. Bears 24–16. **Drive: 8 plays, 80 yards, 3:45.**
- CHI – Cairo Santos 29-yard field goal, 1:02. Bears 27–16. **Drive: 7 plays, 16 yards, 1:55.**

**Top passers**

- ARI – Kyler Murray – 24/38, 230 yards, 2 TD
- CHI – Justin Fields – 15/27, 170 yards, TD, INT

**Top rushers**

- ARI – James Conner – 12 rushes, 45 yards
- CHI – Khalil Herbert – 20 rushes, 112 yards, TD

**Top receivers**

- ARI – Emari Demercado – 7 receptions, 40 yards
- CHI – Cole Kmet – 4 receptions, 107 yards

==== Week 17: vs. Atlanta Falcons ====
Week 17: Atlanta Falcons at Chicago Bears – Game summary

Quarter	1	2	3	4	Total
Falcons	0	7	3	7	**17**
**Bears**	7	14	6	10	**37**

at Soldier Field, Chicago, Illinois

- Date: December 31
- Game time: 12:00 p.m. CST
- Game weather: Light snow, 32 °F (0 °C)
- Game attendance: 61,752
- Referee: Adrian Hill
- TV announcers (CBS): Chris Lewis, Jason McCourty, Ross Tucker and Amanda Renner
- Recap, Game Book

Game information

**First quarter**

- CHI – D. J. Moore 7-yard pass from Justin Fields (Cairo Santos kick), 8:47. Bears 7–0. **Drive: 7 plays, 60 yard, 3:33.**

**Second quarter**

- CHI – Justin Fields 9-yard run (Cairo Santos kick), 14:14. Bears 14–0. **Drive: 8 plays, 68 yard, 4:03.**
- ATL – Tyler Allgeier 75-yard pass from Taylor Heinicke (Younghoe Koo kick), 14:00. Bears 14–7. **Drive: 1 play, 75 yards, 0:14.**
- CHI – Roschon Johnson 2-yard run (Cairo Santos kick), 4:02. Bears 21–7. **Drive: 12 plays, 75 yards, 7:06.**

**Third quarter**

- CHI – Cairo Santos 22-yard field goal, 11:56. Bears 24–7. **Drive: 7 plays, 71 yards, 3:04.**
- ATL – Younghoe Koo 38-yard field goal, 8:29. Bears 24–10. **Drive: 9 plays, 56 yards, 3:27.**
- CHI – Cairo Santos 42-yard field goal, 1:10. Bears 27–10. **Drive: 6 plays, 22 yards, 2:48.**

**Fourth quarter**

- ATL – Taylor Heinicke 24-yard run (Younghoe Koo kick), 12:22. Bears 27–17. **Drive: 11 plays, 75 yards, 3:48.**
- CHI – Cairo Santos 42-yard field goal, 4:59. Bears 30–17. **Drive: 7 plays, 20 yards, 3:21.**
- CHI – Khalil Herbert 1-yard run (Cairo Santos kick), 3:39. Bears 37–17. **Drive: 3 plays, 41 yards, 0:19.**

**Top passers**

- ATL – Taylor Heinicke – 10/29, 163 yards, TD, 3 INT
- CHI – Justin Fields – 20/32, 268 yards, TD

**Top rushers**

- ATL – Bijan Robinson – 15 rushes, 75 yards
- CHI – Khalil Herbert – 18 rushes, 124 yards, TD

**Top receivers**

- ATL – Drake London – 4 receptions, 56 yards
- CHI – D. J. Moore – 9 receptions, 159 yards, TD

==== Week 18: at Green Bay Packers ====
Week 18: Chicago Bears at Green Bay Packers – Game summary

Quarter	1	2	3	4	Total
Bears	3	3	0	3	**9**
**Packers**	0	7	7	3	**17**

at Lambeau Field, Green Bay, Wisconsin

- Date: January 7
- Game time: 3:25 p.m. CST
- Game weather: Cloudy, 34 °F (1 °C)
- Game attendance: 78,188
- Referee: Carl Cheffers
- TV announcers (CBS): Jim Nantz, Tony Romo and Tracy Wolfson
- Recap, Game Book

Game information

**First quarter**

- CHI – Cairo Santos 50-yard field goal, 8:54. Bears 3–0. **Drive: 10 plays, 37 yards, 6:06.**

**Second quarter**

- GB – Dontayvion Wicks 10-yard pass from Jordan Love (Anders Carlson kick), 7:20. Packers 7–3. **Drive: 11 plays, 92 yards, 6:42.**
- CHI – Cairo Santos 39-yard field goal, 1:17. Packers 7–6. **Drive: 11 plays, 45 yards, 6:03.**

**Third quarter**

- GB – Dontayvion Wicks 12-yard pass from Jordan Love (Anders Carlson kick), 9:47. Packers 14–6. **Drive: 9 plays, 75 yards, 5:13.**

**Fourth quarter**

- CHI – Cairo Santos 35-yard field goal, 13:03. Packers 14–9. **Drive: 8 plays, 41 yards, 3:14.**
- GB – Anders Carlson 25-yard field goal, 10:54. Packers 17–9. **Drive: 5 plays, 65 yards, 2:09.**

**Top passers**

- CHI – Justin Fields – 11/16, 148 yards
- GB – Jordan Love – 27/32, 316 yards, 2 TD

**Top rushers**

- CHI – Khalil Herbert – 12 rushes, 28 yards
- GB – Aaron Jones – 22 rushes, 111 yards

**Top receivers**

- CHI – D. J. Moore – 4 receptions, 64 yards
- GB – Dontayvion Wicks – 6 receptions, 61 yards, 2 TD

=== Standings ===
==== Division ====
NFC North
	W	L	T	PCT	DIV	CONF	PF	PA	STK
^{(3)} Detroit Lions	12	5	0	.706	4–2	8–4	461	395	W1
^{(7)} Green Bay Packers	9	8	0	.529	4–2	7–5	383	350	W3
Minnesota Vikings	7	10	0	.412	2–4	6–6	344	362	L4
Chicago Bears	7	10	0	.412	2–4	6–6	360	379	L1

==== Conference ====
NFC
#	Team	Division	W	L	T	PCT	DIV	CONF	SOS	SOV	STK
**Division leaders**
1 (Note: San Francisco finished ahead of Dallas and Detroit based on conference record, claiming the No. 1 seed.)	San Francisco 49ers	West	12	5	0	.706	5–1	10–2	.509	.475	L1
2 (Note: Dallas claimed the No. 2 seed over Detroit based on head-to-head victory.)	Dallas Cowboys	East	12	5	0	.706	5–1	9–3	.446	.392	W2
3	Detroit Lions	North	12	5	0	.706	4–2	8–4	.481	.436	W1
4 (Note: Tampa Bay finished ahead of New Orleans in the NFC South based on common record. (Tampa Bay is 8–4 against Minnesota, Chicago, Detroit, Green Bay, Atlanta, Carolina, Houston, Tennessee, Jacksonville, and Indianapolis, while New Orleans is 6–6 against the same teams.))	Tampa Bay Buccaneers	South	9	8	0	.529	4–2	7–5	.481	.379	W1
**Wild cards**
5	Philadelphia Eagles	East	11	6	0	.647	4–2	7–5	.481	.476	L2
6	Los Angeles Rams	West	10	7	0	.588	5–1	8–4	.529	.453	W4
7 (Note: Green Bay and Seattle finished ahead of New Orleans based on conference record.) (Note: Green Bay finished ahead of Seattle based on strength of victory, claiming the 7th and final playoff spot.)	Green Bay Packers	North	9	8	0	.529	4–2	7–5	.474	.458	W3
**Did not qualify for the postseason**
8	Seattle Seahawks	West	9	8	0	.529	2–4	7–5	.512	.392	W1
9	New Orleans Saints	South	9	8	0	.529	4–2	6–6	.433	.340	W2
10 (Note: Minnesota finished ahead of Atlanta based on head-to-head victory. Division tie break was initially used to eliminate Chicago (see below).) (Note: Minnesota finished ahead of Chicago based on common record. (Minnesota is 5–7 against Tampa Bay, Los Angeles Chargers, Carolina, Kansas City, Green Bay, Atlanta, New Orleans, Denver, Las Vegas, and Detroit, while Chicago is 4–8 against the same teams.))	Minnesota Vikings	North	7	10	0	.412	2–4	6–6	.509	.454	L4
11 (Note: Chicago finished ahead of Atlanta based on head-to-head victory.)	Chicago Bears	North	7	10	0	.412	2–4	6–6	.464	.370	L1
12	Atlanta Falcons	South	7	10	0	.412	3–3	4–8	.429	.462	L2
13	New York Giants	East	6	11	0	.353	3–3	5–7	.512	.353	W1
14 (Note: Washington finished ahead of Arizona based on head-to-head victory.)	Washington Commanders	East	4	13	0	.235	0–6	2–10	.512	.338	L8
15	Arizona Cardinals	West	4	13	0	.235	0–6	3–9	.561	.588	L1
16	Carolina Panthers	South	2	15	0	.118	1–5	1–11	.522	.500	L3
**Tiebreakers** (Note: When breaking ties for three or more teams under the NFL's rules, they are first broken within divisions, then comparing only the highest-ranked remaining team from each division.)
