= Jaylon Johnson =

American football player (born 1999)

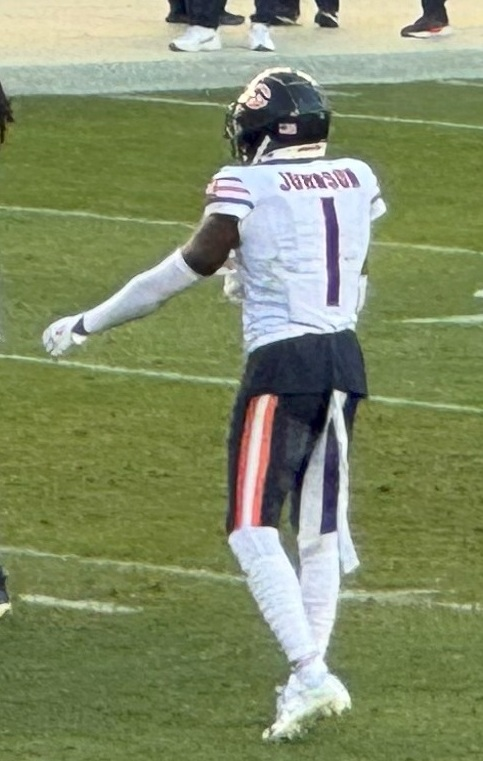
- Johnson with the Chicago Bears in 2024

No. 1 – Chicago Bears
- Position: Cornerback
- Roster status: Active

Personal information
- Born: April 19, 1999 (age 27); Fresno, California, U.S.
- Listed height: 6 ft 0 in (1.83 m)
- Listed weight: 195 lb (88 kg)

Career information
- High school: Central (Fresno)
- College: Utah (2017–2019)
- NFL draft: 2020: 2nd round, 50th overall pick

Career history
- Chicago Bears (2020–present)

Awards and highlights
- Second-team All-Pro (2023); 2× Pro Bowl (2023, 2024); 2× First-team All-Pac-12 (2018, 2019)

Career NFL statistics as of Week 9, 2026
- Total tackles: 258
- Forced fumbles: 5
- Fumble recoveries: 1
- Pass deflections: 54
- Interceptions: 9
- Defensive touchdowns: 2
- Stats at Pro Football Reference

Jaylon Lawrence Johnson (born April 19, 1999) is an American professional football cornerback for the Chicago Bears of the National Football League (NFL). He played college football for the Utah Utes.

== Early life ==
Johnson attended Central High School in Fresno, California. He played in the 2017 US Army All-American Bowl. He committed to the University of Utah to play college football. Johnson also played basketball in high school.

== College career ==
As a true freshman at Utah in 2017, Johnson played in 12 games and made two starts, recording 25 tackles and one interception. He became a starter his sophomore year in 2018, starting all 14 games. He finished the season with 41 tackles, four interceptions and a touchdown. Johnson returned as a starter his junior year in 2019. Following a junior season where he had 10 pass breakups and was named to the First-team All-Pac-12 Conference, Johnson announced that he would forgo his senior season and declare for the 2020 NFL draft.

== Professional career ==
=== Draft ===
Pre-draft measurables
Height	Weight	Arm length	Hand span	Wingspan	40-yard dash	10-yard split	20-yard split	20-yard shuttle	Three-cone drill	Vertical jump	Broad jump	Bench press
5 ft 11 7/8 in (1.83 m)	193 lb (88 kg)	31 3/8 in (0.80 m)	9 3/8 in (0.24 m)	6 ft 2 3/8 in (1.89 m)	4.50 s	1.59 s	2.66 s	4.13 s	7.01 s	36.5 in (0.93 m)	10 ft 4 in (3.15 m)	15 reps
All values from NFL Combine

Pro Football Focus ranked Johnson fourth (24th overall) amongst all cornerbacks in the 2020 NFL Draft. Sports Illustrated ranked him the seventh best cornerback in the draft. CBS Sports ranked him as the eighth best cornerback in the draft. NFL draft analysts projected Johnson to be drafted in the second or third round.

The Chicago Bears selected Johnson in the second round (50th overall). He was the seventh cornerback drafted and was the first of two cornerbacks the Bears drafted in 2020, along with sixth round pick (163rd overall) Kindle Vildor.

=== 2020 ===
On July 21, 2020, the Chicago Bears signed Johnson to a four–year, $6.46 million contract that included $3.16 million guaranteed upon signing and an initial signing bonus of $2.26 million.

Throughout training camp, Johnson competed to be the No. 2 starting cornerback against Buster Skrine, Duke Shelley, and Kindle Vildor after it became vacant following the departure of Prince Amukamara. Head coach Matt Nagy named Kyle Fuller and Johnson the starting cornerbacks to begin the season.

On September 13, 2020, Johnson started in the Chicago Bears' season-opener at the Detroit Lions and made a season-high six combined tackles (five solo) and a season-high three pass deflections during a 27–23 comeback victory. In Week 10, he collected a season-high tying five solo tackles during a 13–19 loss to the Minnesota Vikings. On December 13, 2020, Johnson made three solo tackles before exiting in the third quarter due to an injury as the Bears defeated the Houston Texans 36–7. He injured his shoulder and was subsequently sidelined for the final three games (Weeks 15–17) of the season. He finished his rookie season in 2020 with a total of 44 combined tackles (34 solo) and 15 passes defended in 13 games and 13 starts.

=== 2021 ===
On January 22, 2021, the Chicago Bears promoted Sean Desai from safeties coach to defensive coordinator after the retirement of Chuck Pagano. Johnson became the Bears' No. 1 cornerback after Kyle Fuller was released. Head coach Matt Nagy paired Johnson with Kindle Vildor as the starting cornerback duo to kickoff the season.

On September 19, 2021, Johnson made two combined tackles, a career-high four pass deflections, and made his first career interception on a pass thrown by Joe Burrow to wide receiver Tee Higgins during a 20-17 victory against the Cincinnati Bengals. Through the first two weeks of the season, on all passes to players he was covering, Johnson only allowed one reception, while knocking down three attempts and intercepting a pass. This earned him the highest-rated pass coverage grade (an advanced stat that measures the ability to cover receivers) in the league through that point. On November 25, 2020, Johnson recorded a season-high six combined tackles (five solo) and forced a fumble during a 16–14 win at the Detroit Lions on Thanksgiving Day. He was inactive for two games (Weeks 15–16) while listed as active/COVID-19. He finished his sophomore season with a total of 46 combined tackles (37 solo), nine pass deflections, one forced fumble, and one interception in 15 games and 15 starts.

=== 2022 ===
On January 10, 2022, the Chicago Bears fired head coach Matt Nagy and general manager Ryan Pace after finishing the 2021 NFL season with a 6–11 record. On January 27, 2022, former Indianapolis Colts' defensive coordinator Matt Eberflus was hired as the new head coach. Johnson did not attend the team's voluntary offseason training activities and was subsequently demoted to backup behind Kindle Vildor and Kyler Gordon. Defensive coordinator Alan Williams chose to implement a base 3–4 defense. During training camp, Johnson competed to reclaim a starting role against Kindle Vildor, Kyler Gordon, Jaylon Jones, Josh Blackwell, and Lamar Jackson. Head coach Matt Eberflus named Johnson and rookie Kyler Gordon the starting cornerbacks to begin the season.

On September 18, 2022, Johnson exited in the start of the first quarter of a 10–27 loss at the Green Bay Packers after suffering an injury. He injured his quadriceps and missed the next three games (Weeks 2–5). In Week 12, he collected a season-high seven combined tackles (five solo) during a 10–31 loss at the New York Jets. On December 18, 2022, Johnson racked up a season-high six solo tackles and a season-high three pass deflections before exiting during the fourth quarter of a 20–25 loss against the Philadelphia Eagles after injuring his finger. On December 23, 2022, the Chicago Bears officially placed him on injured reserve after breaking his right ring finger. Eberflus confirmed Johnson could have potentially returned, but the team did not want to risk Johnson injuring his finger any further. He subsequently missed the last three games (Weeks 16–18) of the season. He ended the season with 35 combined tackles (28 solo), seven pass defenses, and a forced fumble in 11 games and 11 starts.

=== 2023 ===
Johnson entered training camp slated as a de facto starting cornerback. Head coach Matt Eberflus named Johnson and Kyler Gordon the starting cornerback duo to begin the regular season. He began the 2023 NFL season in the final year of his rookie contract. He voiced interest in signing a contract extension with the Bears, but neither party could come to an agreement during the preseason or regular season. He was sidelined for two games (Weeks 4–5) after injuring his hamstring. Pro Football Focus graded him as the 10th-best cornerback in the NFL through the first six weeks of the season.

On October 22, 2023, Johnson made three combined tackles (two solo), two pass deflections, a career-high two interceptions, and returned one 39–yards to score the first touchdown of his career during a 30–12 victory against the Las Vegas Raiders. He scored the touchdown after intercepting a pass thrown by Brian Hoyer to wide receiver Davante Adams in the fourth quarter. In Week 9, he collected a season-high four combined tackles (three solo) as the Bears lost 17–24 at the New Orleans Saints. On November 27, 2023, Johnson made two solo tackles, a season-high three pass deflections, and intercepted a pass by Joshua Dobbs to Jordan Addison during a 12–10 win at the Minnesota Vikings. The following week, he had one solo tackle, a pass deflection, and set a career-high with his fourth interception of the season on a pass thrown by Jared Goff during a 28–13 win against the Detroit Lions in Week 14. He finished the season with 36 combined tackles (31 solo), ten pass deflections, a career-high four interceptions, and one touchdown in 14 games and 14 starts. He was named to the 2024 Pro Bowl. Pro Football Focus had Johnson as the highest graded cornerback in 2023 with a career-high overall grade of 90.8 and was also first amongst cornerbacks in coverage grade with 91.0.

=== 2024 ===
On March 5, 2024, the Chicago Bears placed the franchise tag on Johnson which was for one–year, $19.80 million. On March 7, 2024, the Chicago Bears and Johnson agreed to a four–year, $76.00 million contract that includes $51.40 million guaranteed, $43.80 million guaranteed upon signing, and an initial signing bonus of $20.00 million. On May 1, 2024, the Bears announced that Johnson had decided to change his uniform number from No. 33 to No. 1. Johnson chose to select No. 1 after it became available to him for the first time following the departure of quarterback Justin Fields.

New defensive coordinator Eric Washington retained Johnson as a starting cornerback and paired him with Tyrique Stevenson. On September 8, 2024, Johnson started in the Chicago Bears' home-opener against the Tennessee Titans and made three solo tackles, a season-high two pass deflections, and intercepted a pass by Will Levis to wide receiver Tyler Boyd during a 24–17 victory. In Week 4, he collected a season-high five solo tackles in a 24–18 win against the Los Angeles Rams. In Week 11, Johnson collected a season-high six combined tackles (four solo) and broke up a pass during a 19–20 loss to the Green Bay Packers. He started all 17 games in 2024 and recorded 53 combined tackles (48 solo), eight pass deflections, and two interceptions. He was named to the Pro Bowl for the second time. Johnson received an overall grade of 71.7 from Pro Football Focus, which ranked 36th amongst his position group.

=== 2025 ===
Johnson missed 2025 training camp after tearing an adductor muscle on his pelvis. On September 22, he was placed on injured reserve after undergoing surgery to repair a core muscle injury.

He was activated on November 27, ahead of the team's Week 13 matchup against the Philadelphia Eagles. Johnson recorded his only interception of the season in Week 15 off the Cleveland Browns' Shedeur Sanders.

=== 2026 ===
Johnson struggled during the first half of the 2026 season. Through the first eight games, he posted career worsts in categories like passer rating (123.6) and percentage of catches allowed (70 percent). He also had nine missed tackles, tying his most in a season. Johnson acknowledged his poor performances during this stretch, saying he had no excuses and "just got to get it done."

In the first game against the Carolina Panthers, despite forcing a fumble on Tetairoa McMillan, Johnson gave up the second most receiving yards of any defensive back in the league that week with 131. The Week 5 loss to the Packers saw him allow a perfect passer rating of 158.3 along with a 53-yard touchdown pass to Christian Watson. He received criticism for missing several tackles in the Week 7 win over the New England Patriots, including failing to bring down running back Rhamondre Stevenson on a short play that resulted in a 48-yard touchdown to end the first half.

Amid his struggles, Johnson gave up just five yards on four targets when the Bears beat the Atlanta Falcons in Week 6. In Week 9, he intercepted Tampa Bay Buccaneers quarterback Baker Mayfield's pass for Cade Otton and returned the pick 67 yards for a touchdown. It was his first return touchdown since 2023 and contributed to Chicago's 27–24 victory.

== NFL career statistics ==
Legend
**Bold**	Career high

=== Regular season ===
Year	Team	Games		Tackles					Interceptions						Fumbles				
Year	Team	GP	GS	Comb	Total	Ast	Sck	TFL	PD	Int	Yds	Avg	Lng	TDs	FF	Fum	FR	Yds	TD
2020	CHI	13	13	44	34	10	0.0	1	**15**	0	0	0.0	0	0	0	0	0	0	0
2021	CHI	15	15	46	37	9	0.0	1	9	1	3	3.0	3	0	**1**	0	0	0	0
2022	CHI	11	11	35	28	7	0.0	1	7	0	0	0.0	0	0	**1**	0	**1**	**17**	0
2023	CHI	14	14	36	31	5	0.0	1	10	**4**	65	16.3	39	**1**	**1**	**1**	0	0	0
2024	CHI	**17**	**17**	**53**	**42**	**11**	0.0	**7**	8	2	11	5.5	9	0	**1**	0	0	0	0
2025	CHI	7	6	17	15	2	0.0	0	2	1	0	0.0	0	0	0	0	0	0	0
2026	CHI	9	9	27	21	6	0.0	2	3	1	**67**	**67.0**	**67**	**1**	**1**	0	0	0	0
Career		86	85	258	208	50	0.0	13	54	9	146	16.2	67	2	5	1	1	17	0

=== Postseason ===
Year	Team	Games		Tackles					Interceptions						Fumbles				
Year	Team	GP	GS	Comb	Total	Ast	Sck	TFL	PD	Int	Yds	Avg	Lng	TDs	FF	Fum	FR	Yds	TD
2025	CHI	2	2	6	5	1	0.0	0	2	0	0	0.0	0	0	0	0	0	0	0
Career		2	2	6	5	1	0.0	0	2	0	0	0.0	0	0	0	0	0	0	0
