= Kyler Gordon =

American football player (born 1999)

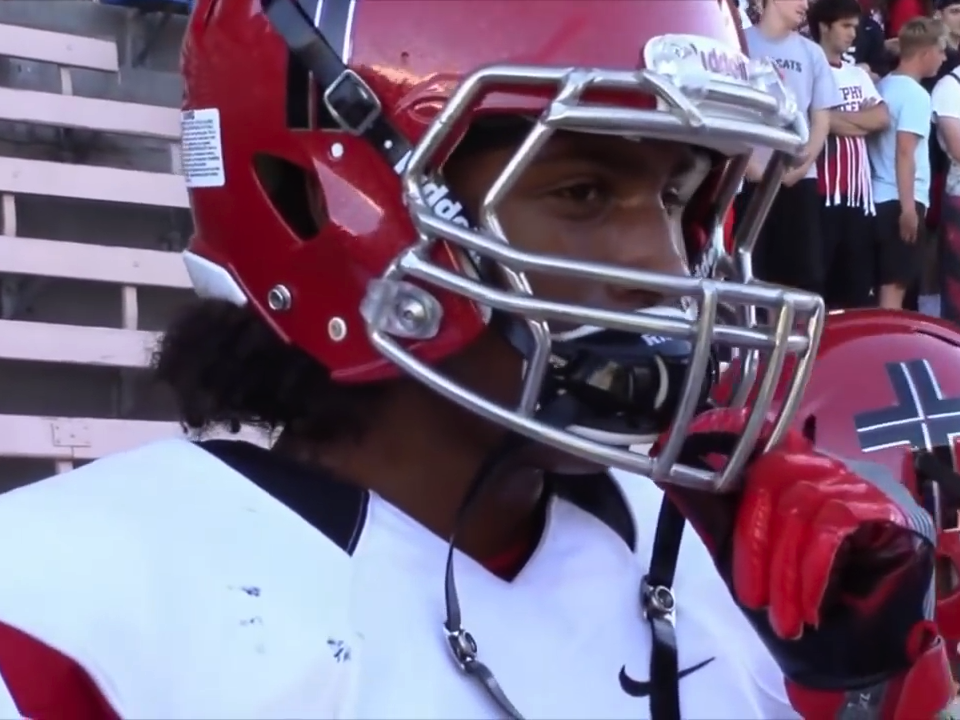
- Gordon with Archbishop Murphy in 2016

No. 6 – Chicago Bears
- Position: Cornerback
- Roster status: Active

Personal information
- Born: December 17, 1999 (age 26); Mukilteo, Washington, U.S.
- Listed height: 5 ft 11 in (1.80 m)
- Listed weight: 200 lb (91 kg)

Career information
- High school: Archbishop Murphy (Everett, Washington)
- College: Washington (2018–2021)
- NFL draft: 2022: 2nd round, 39th overall pick

Career history
- Chicago Bears (2022–present)

Awards and highlights
- First-team All-Pac-12 (2021)

Career NFL statistics as of Week 6, 2026
- Total tackles: 218
- Sacks: 5.5
- Forced fumbles: 2
- Fumble recoveries: 5
- Pass deflections: 17
- Interceptions: 5
- Stats at Pro Football Reference

Kyler Gordon (born December 17, 1999) is an American professional football cornerback for the Chicago Bears of the National Football League (NFL). He played college football for the Washington Huskies and was selected by the Bears in the second round of the 2022 NFL draft.

== Early life ==
Gordon became a ballet dancer at a young age, and has used it to his advantage. Gordon's balance and jumping, as showcased at the NFL Combine, helped him become an early second round draft pick many years later. Ballet is more of a hobby for him now as he moves to professional football, but he still credits ballet for a lot of his football success.

Gordon attended Archbishop Murphy High School in Everett, Washington. He played cornerback and wide receiver in high school. He committed to the University of Washington to play college football.

== College career ==
Gordon played in four games his first year at Washington in 2018 and was redshirted. In 2019, he started four of 13 games, recording 32 tackles. In 2020, he started one of four games and had 18 tackles. Gordon became a full-time starter in 2021. On January 5, 2022, Gordon declared for the 2022 NFL draft.

== Professional career ==
=== Pre-draft ===
NFL draft analysts Mel Kiper Jr. of ESPN and Dane Brugler of the Athletic had Gordon ranked as the fourth best cornerback prospect available in the draft. NFL.com media analyst Daniel Jeremiah listed Gordon as the fifth best cornerback amongst his position in the draft. Thor Nystrom of NBC Sports ranked him sixth amongst all cornerbacks in the draft. Kevin Hanson of Sports Illustrated ranked Gordon as the seventh best cornerback prospect in the draft. Michael Renner of Pro Football Focus listed him as the eighth best cornerback prospect (58th overall) on his big board. Pro Football Focus ranked him ninth among all cornerbacks available in the draft. NFL draft analysts and scouts projected him to be a first or second round pick.

External videos
- NFL Scouting Combine: Kyler Gordon

Pre-draft measurables
Height	Weight	Arm length	Hand span	Wingspan	40-yard dash	10-yard split	20-yard split	20-yard shuttle	Three-cone drill	Vertical jump	Broad jump	Bench press
5 ft 11 1/2 in (1.82 m)	194 lb (88 kg)	31 in (0.79 m)	9 1/4 in (0.23 m)	6 ft 2 3/4 in (1.90 m)	4.52 s	1.56 s	2.62 s	3.96 s	6.67 s	39.5 in (1.00 m)	10 ft 8 in (3.25 m)	20 reps
All values from NFL Combine/Pro Day

=== 2022 ===
The Chicago Bears selected Gordon in the second round (39th overall) of the 2022 NFL draft. He was the sixth cornerback drafted in 2022.

External videos
- Bears select Kyler Gordon No. 39

On June 25, 2022, the Chicago Bears signed Gordon to a four–year, $8.68 million rookie contract that includes $5.79 million guaranteed upon signing and an initial signing bonus of $3.49 million.

He entered training camp projected to be the No. 2 starting cornerback, but suffered a minor injury that forced him to miss numerous practices. He competed for a starting position against Kindle Vildor under defensive coordinator Alan Williams. Head coach Matt Eberflus named him the No. 2 starting cornerback and starting nickelback to begin the season and paired him with No. 1 starting cornerback Jaylon Johnson.

On September 11, 2022, Gordon made his professional regular season debut and first career start during the Chicago Bears' home-opener against the San Francisco 49ers and made six solo tackles as the Bears won 19–10. On October 24, 2022, Gordon made one pass deflection and had his first career interception on a pass thrown by Bailey Zappe to wide receiver Tyquan Thornton to seal the Bears' 33–14 win at the New England Patriots. In Week 11, Gordon recorded seven combined tackles (four solo) before exiting during the third quarter in the Bears' 24–27 loss at the Atlanta Falcons due to a head injury that occurred when he collided with Marcus Mariota at the goal line while attempting a tackle on a ten–yard rushing touchdown by Mariota. He was diagnosed with a concussion and was subsequently placed into concussion protocol and remained inactive for the next two games (Weeks 12–13). He was inactive for the Bears' 13–29 loss against the Minnesota Vikings due to a groin injury. He finished his rookie season with 71 combined tackles (65 solo), six pass deflections, and three interceptions in 14 games and 14 starts.

=== 2023 ===
During training camp, Gordon competed against rookie second-round pick Tyrique Stevenson for the role as the No. 2 starting cornerback. He began the season as the third cornerback on the depth chart behind starting tandem Jaylon Johnson and Tyrique Stevenson and retained his role at starting nickelback.

On September 10, 2023, Gordon made one solo tackle and a pass deflection before exiting in the third quarter of the Bears' 20–38 loss against the Green Bay Packers after injuring his hand. On September 14, 2023, the Bears officially placed him on injured reserve and reported that Gordon had undergone surgery due to fracturing his hand. On October 14, 2023, the Bears removed him from injured reserve and added him back to their active roster after he was sidelined for four games (Weeks 2–5).. In Week 10, he collected a season-high eight combined tackles (seven solo) and broke up a pass during a 16–13 win against the Carolina Panthers. In Week 16, he made seven combined tackles (six solo), one pass deflection, and had his first career sack on Kyler Murray for an eight–yard loss as the Bears defeated the Arizona Cardinals 27–16. On December 31, 2023, Gordon made three combined tackles (two solo) a pass deflection, and helped seal a 17–37 victory against the Atlanta Falcons with an interception on a pass by Taylor Heinicke to wide receiver KhaDarel Hodge near the end of the fourth quarter. He finished the 2023 NFL season with a total of 61 combined tackles (44 solo), six pass deflections, two interceptions, and one sack in 13 games and seven starts.

=== 2024 ===
The Chicago Bears hired Eric Washington as their new defensive coordinator after Alan Williams resigned at the beginning of the 2023 NFL season. Washington chose to retain Jaylon Johnson and Tyrique Stevenson as the starting cornerbacks as Gordon remained third on the depth chart and the first-team nickelback.

On October 13, 2024, Gordon produced seven combined tackles (five solo) before suffering an injury and exited during the third quarter of 35–16 win against the Jacksonville Jaguars. On November 29, the Bears announced their decision to fire head coach Matt Eberflus after they fell to a 4–8 record. In Week 14, he recorded four combined tackles (two solo) and made a season-high two pass deflections as the Bears defeated the Tennessee Titans 17–24. He ended the 2024 NFL season with a total of 75 combined tackles (48 solo), five pass deflections, a career-high three fumble recoveries, a forced fumble in 15 games and 13 starts. He received an overall grade of 76.0 from Pro Football Focus, which ranked him 20th among 122 cornerbacks in 2024.

=== 2025 ===
On April 13, 2025, Gordon agreed to a three-year, $40 million contract extension with the Bears. He was placed on injured reserve due to groin and calf injuries on October 25. Gordon was activated on November 27, ahead of the team's Week 13 matchup against the Philadelphia Eagles. Gordon was placed back on injured reserve due to a groin injury on December 13. He was activated on January 10, 2026, ahead of the team's Wild Card matchup against the Green Bay Packers.

=== 2026 ===
Gordon began the 2026 season on the PUP list due to a calf injury. He was activated on October 17.

After missing the first five games, Gordon made his 2026 debut against the Atlanta Falcons. He recorded four tackles, three tackles for loss, three sacks, and two forced fumbles as the Bears won 31–23. Gordon's trio of sacks tied the NFL record for the most in a game by a cornerback and were the most by a Bears defensive back since Todd Bell in 1983. Gordon had another sack in the following week's victory over the New England Patriots.

== Personal life ==
Gordon grew up as a fan of Spider-Man. Bears head coach Matt Eberflus nicknamed Gordon "Spider-Man" in 2022. He embraced the nickname by wearing custom Spider-Man cleats and gloves during pre-game warmups, and even going as far as wearing a Spider-Man mask before a game against the Los Angeles Chargers on October 29, 2023. His signature celebration is a backflip followed by one of Spider-Man's poses.
