= Duke Shelley =

American football player (born 1996)

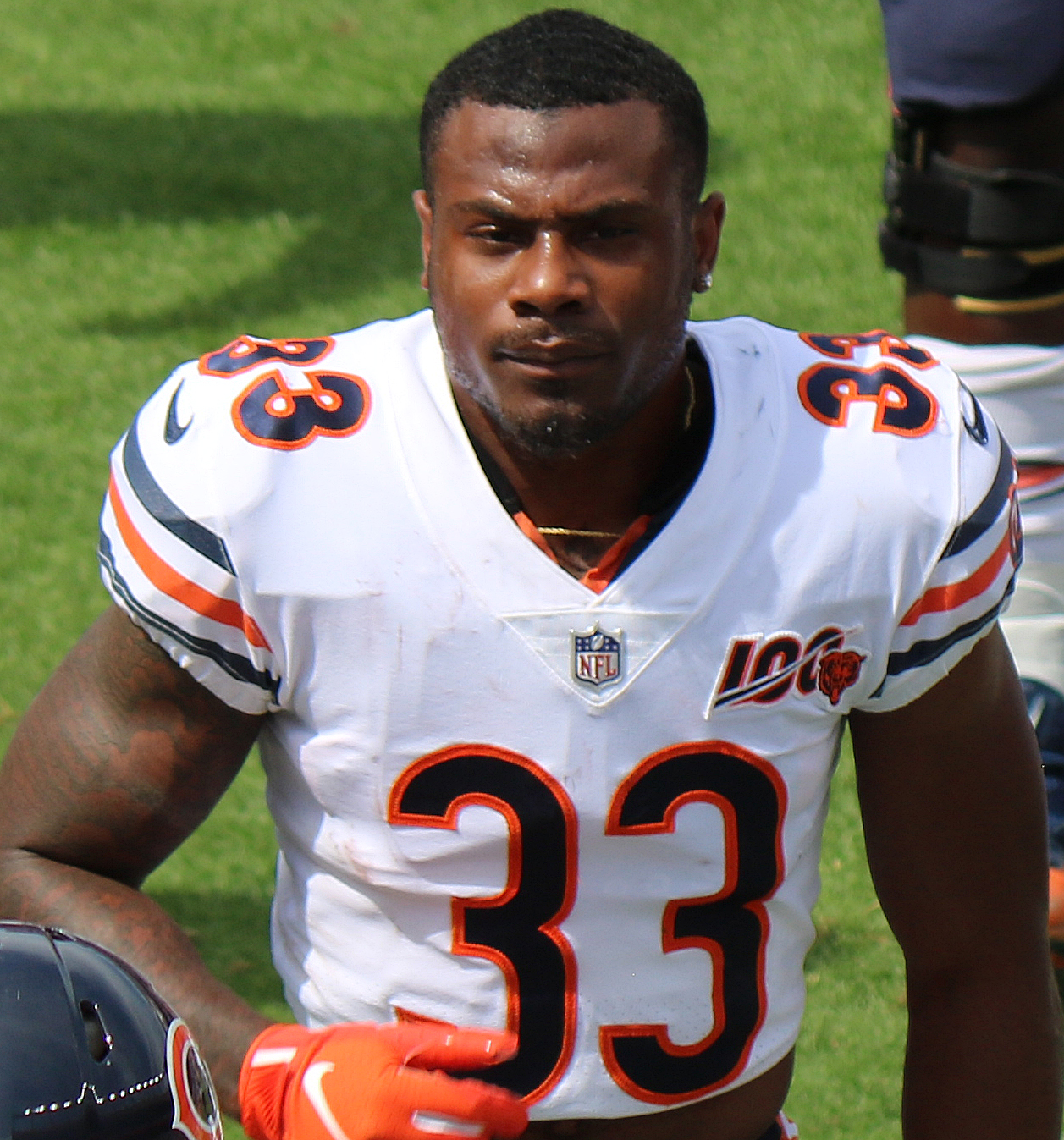
- Shelley with the Chicago Bears in 2019

Profile
- Position: Cornerback

Personal information
- Born: October 8, 1996 (age 30); Tucker, Georgia, U.S.
- Listed height: 5 ft 9 in (1.75 m)
- Listed weight: 176 lb (80 kg)

Career information
- High school: Tucker
- College: Kansas State (2015–2018)
- NFL draft: 2019: 6th round, 205th overall pick

Career history
- Chicago Bears (2019–2021); Minnesota Vikings (2022); Las Vegas Raiders (2023)*; Los Angeles Rams (2023); Minnesota Vikings (2024)*; New York Giants (2024)*; Indianapolis Colts (2025)*
- * Offseason or practice squad member only

Career NFL statistics as of 2024
- Total tackles: 93
- Fumble recoveries: 1
- Pass deflections: 14
- Interceptions: 1
- Stats at Pro Football Reference

YaQuis Bertron "Duke" Shelley (born October 8, 1996) is an American professional football cornerback. He played college football for the Kansas State Wildcats and was selected by the Chicago Bears in the sixth round of the 2019 NFL draft.

== Early life ==
Shelley grew up in Tucker, Georgia and attended Tucker High School. He was a three-year starter for the Tigers and was ranked the 22nd best cornerback in his class by Rivals.com and 33rd by ESPN.

== College career ==
In four years at Kansas State, Shelley recorded 165 career tackles and eight interceptions.

During his junior year in 2017, Shelley started all 12 games and recorded 13 pass breakups, fourth most in the Big 12 Conference, and was given honorable mention all-conference honors. His senior year was marred by a season-ending toe injury after seven games.

== Professional career ==
Pre-draft measurables
Height	Weight	Arm length	Hand span	Wingspan	40-yard dash	10-yard split	20-yard split	20-yard shuttle	Three-cone drill	Vertical jump	Broad jump	Bench press
5 ft 8 5/8 in (1.74 m)	173 lb (78 kg)	31 in (0.79 m)	8 1/4 in (0.21 m)	6 ft 1 3/8 in (1.86 m)	4.51 s	1.55 s	2.53 s	4.23 s	7.10 s	34.0 in (0.86 m)	9 ft 6 in (2.90 m)	11 reps
All values from Pro Day

=== Chicago Bears ===
Shelley was drafted by the Chicago Bears in the sixth round (205th overall) in the 2019 NFL draft. Shelley signed a four-year rookie contract with the team on June 20, 2019, worth $2,647,832, including a $127,832 signing bonus. Shelley made his NFL debut on September 5, 2019, in the season opener against the Green Bay Packers. He played in nine games as a rookie, mostly on special teams.

Shelley entered the 2021 season as the third cornerback on the depth chart behind Jaylon Johnson and Kindle Vildor. He played in nine games with three starts before suffering a hamstring injury in Week 11. He was placed on injured reserve on November 23, 2021. He was activated on December 21.

On August 31, 2022, Shelley was waived by the Bears.

=== Minnesota Vikings (first stint) ===
On September 6, 2022, Shelley signed with the practice squad of the Minnesota Vikings. He was promoted to the active roster on November 12, and served as the primary replacement for Cameron Dantzler during his injured reserve stint. He had a game-saving pass deflection in Week 10 against the Buffalo Bills in a 33–30 win. In Week 18 against the Bears, Shelley recorded his first career interception against Tim Boyle.

=== Las Vegas Raiders ===
On March 23, 2023, Shelley signed with the Las Vegas Raiders. He was released on August 29, 2023.

=== Los Angeles Rams ===
On September 1, 2023, Shelley signed with the Los Angeles Rams. He was placed on injured reserve on November 27, and activated on January 10, 2024.

=== Minnesota Vikings (second stint) ===
On July 23, 2024, Shelley signed with the Minnesota Vikings. He was released on August 27.

=== New York Giants ===
On August 29, 2024, Shelley was signed to the New York Giants practice squad. He was released on October 15.

=== Indianapolis Colts ===
On July 31, 2025, Shelley signed with the Indianapolis Colts. He was released by Indianapolis on August 26 as a part of final roster cuts.
