= Jerome Carvin =

American football player (born 2000)

Dallas Renegades
- Position: Offensive tackle
- Roster status: Unsigned draft pick

Personal information
- Born: September 20, 2000 (age 26); Guam
- Listed height: 6 ft 5 in (1.96 m)
- Listed weight: 307 lb (139 kg)

Career information
- High school: Cordova (Cordova, Tennessee)
- College: Tennessee (2018–2022)
- NFL draft: 2023: undrafted

Career history
- Kansas City Chiefs (2023–2024)*; Chicago Bears (2024); New England Patriots (2024)*; Jacksonville Jaguars (2024)*; Houston Texans (2025); Jacksonville Jaguars (2025); Dallas Renegades (2027-present)
- * Offseason or practice squad member only

Career NFL statistics as of 2025
- Games played: 1
- Stats at Pro Football Reference

Jerome Letrell Carvin (born September 20, 2000) is an American professional football offensive tackle. He played college football for the Tennessee Volunteers.

== Early life ==
Carvin was born in the U.S. territory of Guam to LeMark Carvin and Shonda Thomas, a United States Navy servicewoman. The family first moved to Houma, Louisiana shortly after Carvin's birth, before relocating once more to Memphis, Tennessee in February 2005. After settling in Tennessee, Carvin started playing football as early as the fourth grade. He attended Cordova High School where he played offensive and defensive lineman positions with the Cordova Wolves football team. During his sophomore year in 2016, Carvin helped the Wolves build a 12–2 record and play in a state semifinals game. He graduated in 2018 with an athletic scholarship from Dan & Libby Morgan and was rated a four-star recruiting prospect by 247Sports.com and received up to 18 collegiate sports offers.

== College career ==
Carvin enrolled at the University of Tennessee in 2018. He played alongside the Volunteers in all 12 games, taking the field as starting right guard in five games and as a left guard in one game. In his sophomore season in 2019, Carvin played in 12 games, starting the last seven as a right guard. He returned for the 2020 season in which he played all 10 games, starting four games in the right guard position. For the 2021 season, Carvin was promoted to a starting lineman role. He played seven games as a left guard, five games as a center and one game as a right guard. During his fifth and final season in 2022, Carvin was a starting left guard in all 13 games. While at Tennessee, Carvin was reunited with high school football teammate Jeremy Banks. He graduated in 2022 with a communications degree.

== Professional career ==
Pre-draft measurables
Height	Weight	Arm length	Hand span	Wingspan	40-yard dash	10-yard split	20-yard split	20-yard shuttle	Vertical jump	Broad jump	Bench press
6 ft 4 1/8 in (1.93 m)	307 lb (139 kg)	34 1/2 in (0.88 m)	9 3/4 in (0.25 m)	6 ft 10 1/2 in (2.10 m)	5.49 s	1.94 s	3.06 s	4.70 s	24.0 in (0.61 m)	8 ft 2 in (2.49 m)	21 reps
All values from Pro Day

=== Kansas City Chiefs ===
On May 6, 2023, Carvin signed a three-year contract with the Kansas City Chiefs as an undrafted free agent following the 2023 NFL draft. He was released on September 6 before being re-signed by the Chiefs as part of the practice squad on January 1, 2024.

=== Chicago Bears ===
Carvin was signed by the Chicago Bears on January 9, 2024. On August 26, he was waived.

=== New England Patriots ===
Carvin was signed to the New England Patriots practice squad on August 29, 2024, before being released on October 8.

=== Jacksonville Jaguars ===
Carvin signed with the Jacksonville Jaguars on November 12, 2024. He was re-signed to the practice squad the following month on December 10.

=== Houston Texans ===
On January 24, 2025, Carvin signed a reserve/future contract with the Houston Texans. Carvin was waived by Houston alongside Kingsley Jonathan on May 21.

=== Jacksonville Jaguars (second stint) ===
Carvin re-signed with the Jacksonville Jaguars on August 18, 2025. He was waived on August 26 as part of final roster cuts and re-signed to the practice squad the next day. Carvin signed a reserve/future contract with Jacksonville on January 12, 2026.

On August 30, 2026, Carvin was waived by the Jaguars as a part of final roster cuts.

== Personal life ==
Carvin has one brother named LeMark Carvin Jr. and four sisters including Lejerrica Garner, LaShauna Singleton, LaQuinta Carvin and Tianna Thomas. He stated he hopes to hold a sports occupation after his playing career is over and to someday visit his birthplace.
