= Kindle Vildor =

American football player (born 1997)

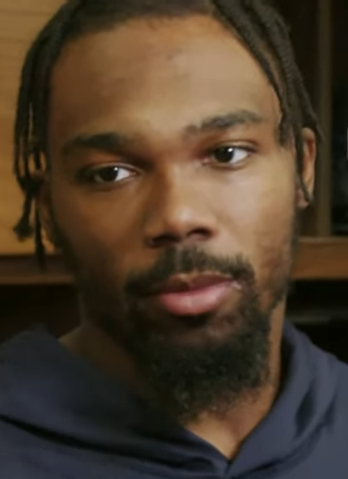
- Vildor with the Tennessee Titans in 2023

No. 28 – New England Patriots
- Position: Cornerback
- Roster status: Practice squad

Personal information
- Born: December 11, 1997 (age 28); Atlanta, Georgia, U.S.
- Listed height: 5 ft 11 in (1.80 m)
- Listed weight: 189 lb (86 kg)

Career information
- High school: North Clayton (College Park, Georgia)
- College: Georgia Southern (2016–2019)
- NFL draft: 2020: 5th round, 163rd overall pick

Career history
- Chicago Bears (2020–2022); Tennessee Titans (2023); Philadelphia Eagles (2023)*; Detroit Lions (2023–2024); Tampa Bay Buccaneers (2025); New England Patriots (2026–present)
- * Offseason or practice squad member only

Awards and highlights
- Sun Belt Player of the Year (2018); 2× First-team All-Sun Belt (2018, 2019); Second-team All-American (2018)

Career NFL statistics as of 2025
- Total tackles: 140
- Sacks: 1.0
- Forced fumbles: 1
- Pass deflections: 18
- Interceptions: 2
- Stats at Pro Football Reference

Kindle Lee Vildor (born December 11, 1997) is an American professional football cornerback for the New England Patriots of the National Football League (NFL). He played college football for the Georgia Southern Eagles and was selected by the Chicago Bears in the fifth round of the 2020 NFL draft. He has also played for the Tennessee Titans and Detroit Lions.

== Early life ==
Vildor was born in the DeKalb County, Georgia section of Atlanta and grew up in College Park, Georgia. He attended North Clayton High School. A 2-star cornerback recruit, he committed to Georgia Southern over offers from Troy, Tulane, Western Kentucky, and Wyoming, among others.

== College career ==
Vildor started the final three seasons of his collegiate career. He had 42 tackles, 4.5 tackles for a loss and also lead the team with 11 passes broken up and four interceptions and was named first-team All-Sun Belt Conference in his junior season. Vildor was named first-team All-Sun Belt for a second straight season and a Pro Football Focus All-American as a senior after recording 27 tackles, two interceptions and six passes broken up.

== Professional career ==
Pre-draft measurables
Height	Weight	Arm length	Hand span	Wingspan	40-yard dash	10-yard split	20-yard split	20-yard shuttle	Three-cone drill	Vertical jump	Broad jump	Bench press
5 ft 9 7/8 in (1.77 m)	191 lb (87 kg)	32 1/4 in (0.82 m)	9 5/8 in (0.24 m)	6 ft 3 1/2 in (1.92 m)	4.44 s	1.49 s	2.62 s	4.28 s	7.14 s	39.5 in (1.00 m)	11 ft 1 in (3.38 m)	22 reps
All values from NFL Combine

=== Chicago Bears ===
Vildor was selected by the Chicago Bears with the 163rd pick in the fifth round of the 2020 NFL draft. He signed a four-year rookie contract with the team on July 21. Vildor mostly played on special teams during the 2020 season. In the Bears' Week 15 game against the Jacksonville Jaguars, Vildor made his first NFL start at corner back. In 2020, Vildor played in all 16 games while starting in 1 and had 17 combined tackles and 1 pass defended. In the Bears' Week 11 game against the Baltimore Ravens, Vildor got his first career sack on Ravens quarterback Tyler Huntley. Overall in 2021, Vildor played in 17 games starting in 12 of them with 46 combined tackles, a sack, and 4 passes defended.

Vildor entered the 2022 season as a starting cornerback alongside Jaylon Johnson and Kyler Gordon. In a Week 5 game against the Minnesota Vikings, he got his first career interception off of Kirk Cousins. He finished the season with 34 tackles, five passes defensed and one interception through 11 games and nine starts. On December 23, 2022, Vildor was placed on season–ending injured reserve with an ankle injury he had suffered in late November.

Vildor was waived on August 29, 2023.

=== Tennessee Titans ===
On August 30, 2023, Vildor was claimed off waivers by the Tennessee Titans. He was released by the Titans on October 14.

=== Philadelphia Eagles ===
On October 20, 2023, Vildor was signed to the practice squad of the Philadelphia Eagles. He was released by the Eagles on November 13.

=== Detroit Lions ===
On November 14, 2023, the Detroit Lions signed Vildor to their practice squad. He was signed to the active roster on December 5. In the final game of the Lions season, while nearly intercepting a long pass from San Francisco's Brock Purdy, the ball hit Vildor directly in the facemask of his helmet and deflected upward to be caught by Brandon Aiyuk, eventually leading to a touchdown and continuing an unlikely 49ers comeback drive in the NFC Championship loss.

On April 3, 2024, Vildor re-signed with the Lions.

=== Tampa Bay Buccaneers ===
On March 13, 2025, Vildor signed with the Tampa Bay Buccaneers on a one-year contract.

=== New England Patriots ===
On March 23, 2026, Vildor signed with the New England Patriots on a one-year contract. On August 30, he was released by the Patriots as a part of final roster cuts and re-signed to the practice squad the next day. On October 10, Vildor was signed to the active roster. He was released on November 3 and re-signed to the practice squad two days later.
