= Terell Smith =

American football player (born 1999)

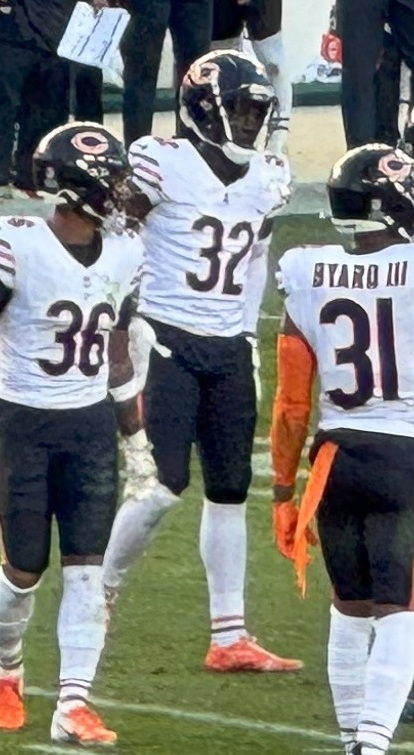
- Smith (32) with the Chicago Bears in 2024

Profile
- Position: Cornerback

Personal information
- Born: July 27, 1999 (age 27); The Bronx, New York, U.S.
- Listed height: 6 ft 0 in (1.83 m)
- Listed weight: 207 lb (94 kg)

Career information
- High school: South Gwinnett (Snellville, Georgia)
- College: Minnesota (2018–2022)
- NFL draft: 2023: 5th round, 165th overall pick

Career history
- Chicago Bears (2023–2025); Washington Commanders (2026)*; Pittsburgh Steelers (2026)
- * Offseason or practice squad member only

Career NFL statistics as of 2026
- Tackles: 69
- Forced fumbles: 1
- Fumble recoveries: 1
- Pass deflections: 10
- Interceptions: 1
- Stats at Pro Football Reference

Terell Smith (born July 27, 1999) is an American professional football cornerback. Smith played college football for the Minnesota Golden Gophers and was selected by the Chicago Bears in the fifth round of the 2023 NFL draft.

== Early life ==
Smith was born on July 27, 1999, in The Bronx, New York, and later moved to Snellville, Georgia, where he attended South Gwinnett High School. He committed to play college football for the Minnesota Golden Gophers at the University of Minnesota.

== College career ==
Smith became a starter at cornerback early into his freshman season at Minnesota. He finished the season with 43 tackles, one interception, and eight passes broken up. Smith saw limited playing time as a backup over the next two seasons after Benjamin St-Juste transferred into the program and became an immediate starter. He redshirted his junior season. He entered his redshirt junior year as a starter but was benched halfway through the season Smith regained his starting spot as a senior and finished the season with 38 tackles, 4.5 tackles for loss, and two sacks with two interceptions and five passes broken up.

== Professional career ==
Pre-draft measurables
Height	Weight	Arm length	Hand span	Wingspan	40-yard dash	10-yard split	20-yard split	20-yard shuttle	Three-cone drill	Vertical jump	Broad jump	Bench press
6 ft 0 1/2 in (1.84 m)	204 lb (93 kg)	32 7/8 in (0.84 m)	9 in (0.23 m)	6 ft 4 3/4 in (1.95 m)	4.41 s	1.50 s	2.52 s	4.30 s	7.00 s	34.0 in (0.86 m)	10 ft 0 in (3.05 m)	14 reps
All values from NFL Combine/Pro Day

=== Chicago Bears ===
Smith was selected by the Chicago Bears in the fifth round, 165th overall, of the 2023 NFL draft. He played in 12 games with four starts, recording 49 tackles, six passes defensed, and a forced fumble as a rookie. In 2024, Smith played in 14 games with two starts, recording 19 tackles, four passes defensed, and an interception.

In the 2025 preseason, Smith suffered a torn patellar tendon and was placed on season-ending injured reserve on August 24, 2025.

On August 30, 2026, the Bears waived Smith as a part of final roster cuts.

=== Washington Commmanders ===
On September 1, 2026, the Washington Commanders signed Smith to their practice squad.

=== Pittsburgh Steelers ===
On October 6, 2026, Smith was signed by the Pittsburgh Steelers off the Commanders practice squad. He was released on November 14.
