= Eric Washington (American football) =

American football coach (born 1969)

Personal information
- Born: October 29, 1969 (age 57); Shreveport, Louisiana, U.S.

Career information
- College: Grambling State

Career history
- Texas A&M (1997) Assistant coach; Ohio (2001–2003) Assistant coach; Northwestern (2004–2007) Defensive line coach; Chicago Bears (2008–2009) Defensive assistant; Chicago Bears (2010) Defensive line coach; Carolina Panthers (2011–2017) Defensive line coach; Carolina Panthers (2018–2019) Defensive coordinator; Buffalo Bills (2020–2021) Defensive line coach; Buffalo Bills (2022) Senior defensive assistant/defensive line coach; Buffalo Bills (2023) Assistant head coach/defensive line coach; Chicago Bears (2024) Defensive coordinator; New York Jets (2025) Defensive line coach
- Coaching profile at Pro Football Reference

Eric Washington (born October 29, 1969) is an American football coach who most recently served as the defensive line coach for the New York Jets of the National Football League (NFL). He has previously served as the defensive line coach for the Buffalo Bills following experience as the defensive coordinator for the Carolina Panthers and defensive line coach for the Bears.

== NFL coaching career ==
=== Chicago Bears ===
Washington was an intern for the Chicago Bears in 2005 as part of the Bill Walsh minority coaching fellowship program, but later returned to coach at Northwestern. In 2008, he was hired as a defensive assistant by the Bears. Washington was promoted to defensive line coach in 2010.

=== Carolina Panthers ===
Washington was hired by the Carolina Panthers as their defensive line coach in 2011. In January 2018, Washington was promoted to defensive coordinator of the Carolina Panthers after Steve Wilks was named head coach of the Arizona Cardinals.

=== Buffalo Bills ===
On January 10, 2020, Washington was hired by the Buffalo Bills as their defensive line coach. With this new role, he rejoined former Carolina Panthers defensive coordinator Sean McDermott, who is now the head coach of the Buffalo Bills.

On March 15, 2022, Washington was promoted by the Bills as their senior defensive assistant/defensive line coach.

On June 21, 2023, Washington was promoted by the Bills as their assistant head coach/defensive line coach.

=== Chicago Bears (second stint) ===
On January 27, 2024, Washington was named the defensive coordinator of the Chicago Bears. He began calling plays on defense for the Bears after head coach Matt Eberflus was fired on November 29. On January 23, 2025, the Bears announced they would not retain Washington for the 2025 season.

=== New York Jets ===
On January 31, 2025, the New York Jets hired Washington to serve as their defensive line coach. Washington was fired on January 23, 2026, by head coach Aaron Glenn.
