= Alan Williams (American football) =

Former American football player and coach (born 1969)

Profile
- Position: Defensive coordinator

Personal information
- Born: November 4, 1969 (age 57); Norfolk, Virginia, U.S.

Career information
- College: William & Mary

Career history
- Norview High School (1992–1995) Assistant head coach/running backs coach/defensive backs coach; William & Mary (1996–1997) Running backs coach; William & Mary (1998–2000) Defensive backs coach; Tampa Bay Buccaneers (2001) Defensive assistant; Indianapolis Colts (2002–2011) Defensive backs coach; Minnesota Vikings (2012–2013) Defensive coordinator; Detroit Lions (2014–2017) Defensive backs coach; Indianapolis Colts (2018–2021) Defensive backs coach; Chicago Bears (2022–2023) Defensive coordinator

Awards and highlights
- Super Bowl champion (XLI)
- Coaching profile at Pro Football Reference

Alan Williams (born November 4, 1969) is an American former football coach and player who was previously the defensive coordinator for the Chicago Bears of the National Football League (NFL).

== College career ==
Between 1988 and 1991, Williams played running back at William & Mary, where he was a teammate of future Pittsburgh Steelers head coach Mike Tomlin and future Buffalo Bills head coach Sean McDermott. Williams finished his playing career at William & Mary with 1,220 rushing yards and 15 rushing touchdowns, while he totaled 131 receptions for 1,331 yards with 7 scores. As a senior, he led the team in receptions (57) and receiving yards (598).

== Coaching career ==
Williams was an assistant coach from 1992 to 1995 for Norview High School, where he also coached track and field. He returned to William & Mary as a coach in 1996, coaching running backs from 1996 to 1997 and defensive backs from 1998 to 2000.

Williams got his first NFL coaching experience coaching under Tony Dungy in the Tampa Bay Buccaneers organization in 2001. The next year, Williams followed Tony Dungy to the Indianapolis Colts where he served as the defensive backs coach for the Colts from 2002 to 2011. With the Colts, Williams won Super Bowl XLI against the Chicago Bears.

On January 19, 2012, he was hired to be the defensive coordinator of the Minnesota Vikings.

On January 24, 2014, Williams joined the Detroit Lions defensive coaching staff as the new secondary coach.

In February 2018, Williams returned to the Indianapolis Colts as the defensive backs/safeties coach.

On February 2, 2022, Williams became the defensive coordinator for the Chicago Bears, following newly appointed head coach Matt Eberflus from the Indianapolis Colts.

On September 20, 2023, Williams resigned, citing health and family concerns.

== Personal life ==
Williams is a native of Norfolk, Virginia. With his wife Lisa, he has three children—Christian, Solomon, and Nathan.
