= Matt Eberflus =

American football coach (born 1970)

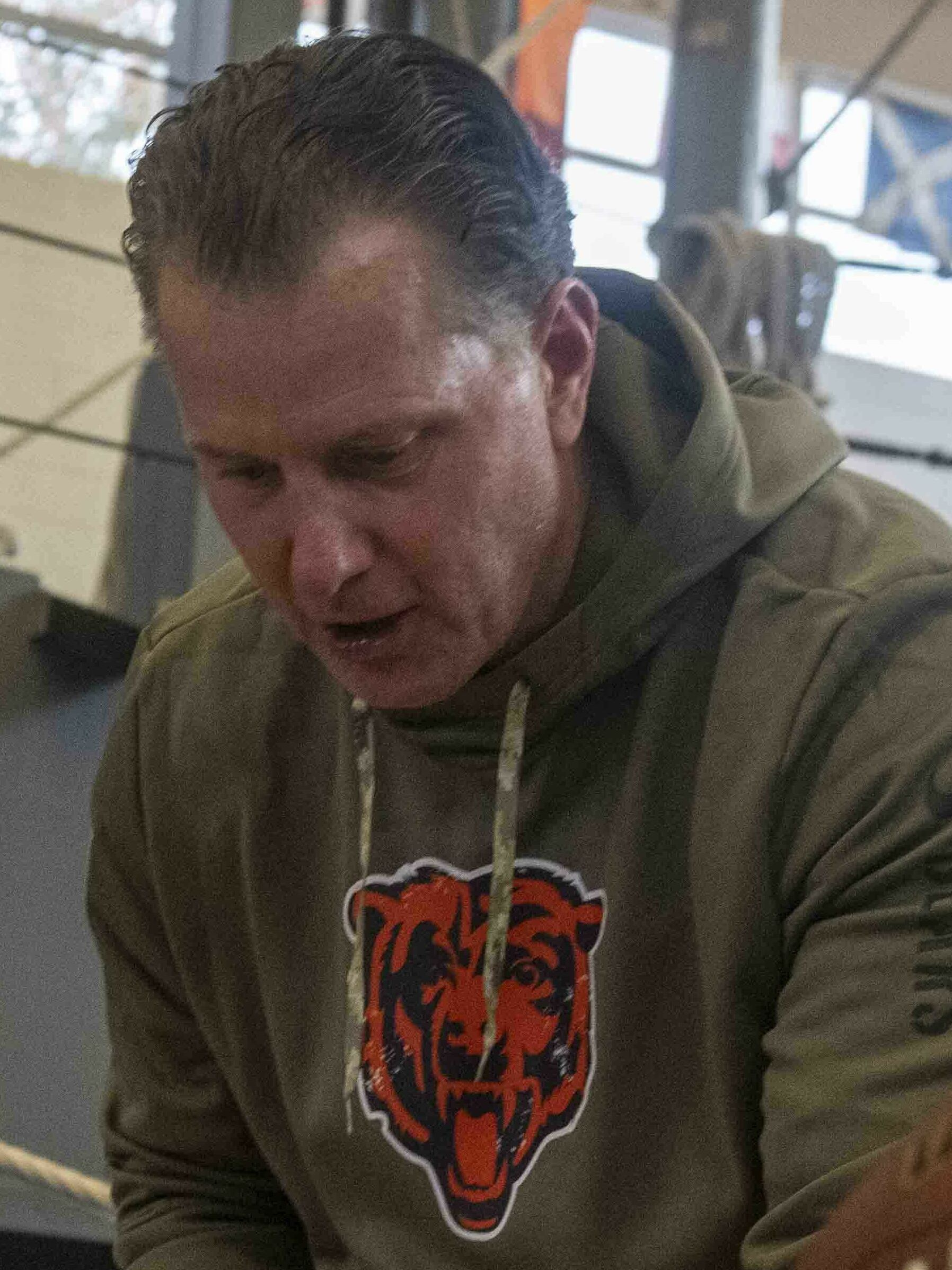
- Eberflus as Chicago Bears head coach in 2022

San Francisco 49ers
- Title: Assistant head coach of defense

Personal information
- Born: May 17, 1970 (age 56); Toledo, Ohio, U.S.

Career information
- Position: Linebacker
- High school: Whitmer
- College: Toledo (1988–1991)

Career history
- Toledo (1992) Student assistant coach; Toledo (1993) Graduate assistant; Toledo (1994–1995) Recruiting coordinator & outside linebackers coach; Toledo (1996–1998) Outside linebacker coach; Toledo (1999–2000) Defensive backs coach; Missouri (2001–2006) Defensive coordinator; Missouri (2007–2008) Defensive coordinator & associate head coach; Cleveland Browns (2009–2010) Linebackers coach; Dallas Cowboys (2011–2015) Linebackers coach; Dallas Cowboys (2016–2017) Linebackers coach & passing game coordinator; Indianapolis Colts (2018–2021) Defensive coordinator; Chicago Bears (2022–2024) Head coach; Dallas Cowboys (2025) Defensive coordinator; San Francisco 49ers (2026–present) Assistant head coach of defense

Head coaching record
- Regular season: 14–32 (.304)
- Coaching profile at Pro Football Reference

Matt Eberflus (/ˈiːbərfluːs/ EE-bər-flooss; born May 17, 1970) is an American professional football coach who is currently the assistant head coach of defense for the San Francisco 49ers. He was the head coach for the Chicago Bears of the National Football League (NFL) from 2022 to 2024. Eberflus also served as the defensive coordinator for the Indianapolis Colts from 2018 to 2021 and the Dallas Cowboys in 2025 and has coached college football for the Toledo Rockets and Missouri Tigers.

== Playing career ==
Eberflus was born on May 17, 1970, and attended Whitmer High School in Toledo, Ohio, where he graduated in 1988 after helping lead the team to the state semifinals in 1987.

=== College ===
Eberflus was a four-year letterman and a three-year starting linebacker at Toledo from 1988 to 1991 under three coaches: Dan Simrell, Nick Saban and Gary Pinkel. Eberflus earned First Team All-MAC honors as a junior and again as a senior, leading the team in tackles both years. As a junior, Eberflus helped lead the Rockets to a 9–2 record and a MAC co-championship. As a team captain his senior year, Eberflus was chosen for the Nicholson Award as the team's Most Valuable Player. His 21 tackles against Northern Illinois University that year ranks as the fifth-best performance by a Toledo player in a single game in school history. Throughout his time at Toledo, Eberflus racked up 325 tackles, including a team-best 89 tackles as a junior and 138 tackles as a senior. Eberflus earned his degree in education from Toledo in 1993 and was inducted into the school's Athletic Hall of Fame in 2004.

As a walk-on who willed his way to all-league honors, former Rockets coach Dan Simrell called Eberflus "as intense of a player as I've ever coached. He made himself great."

== Coaching career ==
=== Toledo ===
Eberflus spent the first nine years of his coaching career at his alma mater, the University of Toledo. He served as a student assistant coach in 1992 under Gary Pinkel, then as a graduate assistant in 1993 before landing a full-time spot in 1994 as recruiting coordinator/outside linebackers coach when defensive coordinator Dean Pees left for Notre Dame. For his last two years at Toledo, Eberflus coached defensive backs. In his seven seasons as a full-time coach, Toledo achieved a winning record in each season, compiling a 56–22–2 record throughout Eberflus's tenure, including an 11–0–1 finish in 1995 and a 10–1 finish in 2000.

=== Missouri ===
When Gary Pinkel was named head coach at the University of Missouri (at Columbia) in 2001, he brought Eberflus with him as his defensive coordinator, where he also coached defensive backs. In 2006, Eberflus was also given the associate head coach title. In 2003, Eberflus helped the Tigers reach the Independence Bowl – Mizzou's first bowl game in five seasons. The following year, the Tigers' pass defense ranked third in the country, and the team ranked second in the Big 12 in total defense. Building on his success, Eberflus guided the Tigers defense to the Big 12 North Division title in 2007 and 2008, compiling a 22–6 record over that span. During the 2007 season, Eberflus was twice recognized as the national defensive coordinator of the week, and capped the season off by holding the Arkansas Razorbacks to just seven points in a 35–7 Cotton Bowl victory. In the spring, Rivals.com recognized Eberflus as the eighth-best defensive coach in the nation.

Eberflus proved as big an asset as a recruiter as he did as a defensive tactician, recruiting four-year starting quarterback Brad Smith, defensive back William Moore, and linebacker Sean Weatherspoon to Columbia. Smith, after becoming just the second player in Division I-A football history to ever pass for 2,000 yards and rush for 1,000 yards in a single season, among numerous collegiate honors, would go on to be drafted by the New York Jets and enjoy an eight-year career as an NFL wide receiver. Under Eberflus's tutelage, Moore was named a First-Team All American (2007) and Second-Team All-Big 12 (2007), and would be drafted in the 2nd Round of the 2009 NFL draft by the Atlanta Falcons, where he would become a Pro Bowl safety (2012). Weatherspoon became a three-time First Team All-Big 12 player (2007, 2008, 2009) and Third Team All-American (2008) under Eberflus before being drafted in the 1st Round of the 2010 NFL draft by the Atlanta Falcons.

=== Cleveland Browns ===
In 2009, Eberflus left Missouri for the NFL, where he was hired as linebackers coach for the Cleveland Browns, and worked under head coach Eric Mangini and defensive coordinator Rob Ryan for two seasons. In his first season, Eberflus transitioned David Bowens from outside linebacker to inside, where he finished with a career-high 71 tackles (47 solo) and 5.5 sacks.

=== Dallas Cowboys ===
In 2011, Eberflus followed Rob Ryan to the Dallas Cowboys, joining the staff of head coach Jason Garrett as the Linebacker Coach. The linebacker group was spearheaded at the time by All-Pro DeMarcus Ware. In Eberflus's first season, Ware registered 19.5 sacks, good for second in the NFC and the NFL and tops amongst all linebackers in the NFL en route to his sixth consecutive selection as a Pro Bowl starter. Eberflus also helped with the continued development of second-year linebacker Sean Lee, who lead the team with 131 tackles (91 solo) and tied for the team-lead with four interceptions, the most by any NFL linebacker in 2011.

In 2012, Eberflus guided DeMarcus Ware and Anthony Spencer to Pro Bowl selections. The duo became the fifth in team history to reach double-digit sacks, Ware with 11.5 and Spencer with 11, the latter a career-high. Spencer also led the team with a career-best 106 tackles, while Ware finished with 72 tackles, a team-best 33 pressures and five forced fumbles. In week 2 at Seattle, Sean Lee posted a then career-high 21 tackles, which tied Lee Roy Jordan for the most tackles in a game in franchise history.

In 2013, with Monte Kiffin replacing Rob Ryan as the team's defensive coordinator, Eberflus was integral in assisting the team's transition to a 4–3 scheme, alongside Rod Marinelli. Marinelli said he was impressed with Eberflus the first time he met him in 2013 in Dallas and credited Eberflus with the successful transition from Ryan's 3–4 defense to the 4–3 (and recently called Eberflus "one of my favorites"). The linebacker corps did not miss a beat, with Sean Lee logging 123 tackles (95 solo) on the season and a team-high four interceptions, all despite missing five games due to injury. Bruce Carter produced from the weakside linebacker position, tallying 122 tackles, 4.0 tackles for loss, 2.0 sacks and three passes defensed.

In 2014, Eberflus’ unit continued to overachieve through an adversity-plagued season. Sean Lee was placed on IR on July 2, having suffered a torn ACL during OTAs. The team replaced Lee by acquiring Rolando McClain in a trade with the Baltimore Ravens. Under Eberflus's tutelage, the once-thought-to-be bust compiled career highs in tackles (108) and interceptions (two) while leading the team with 9.0 tackles for loss. Eberflus was also credited with molding rookie Anthony Hitchens into a pro, as he started 11 of 16 games, playing at every linebacker position, and ultimately finishing third on the team with 100 tackles (74 solo) which not only ranked fifth most by a rookie in team history, but made Hitchens the first rookie defender to record 100 tackles in a season since Roy Williams (127 in 2002). Bruce Carter led the team with a career-high five interceptions, which tied for fourth most in a single season by a linebacker in team history, while also posting 75 tackles to place fifth on the team. Eberflus's work with the linebackers helped the Cowboys improve their rushing defense from No. 27 in 2013 to No. 8 in 2014, and tied for the seventh-most interceptions in the league.

In 2015, Sean Lee returned to the field and Eberflus was charged with transitioning him to the weakside linebacker position, which produced immediate results. Lee totaled 156 tackles (109 solo), 11.0 tackles for loss, 2.5 sacks and one interception on the season en route to his first career Pro Bowl selection. Eberflus also moved Rolando McClain to the middle linebacker position, where he registered 97 tackles, 9.0 tackles for loss and 2.0 sacks. Eberflus also received strong production from Hitchens, who racked up 85 tackles, 3.0 tackles for loss and 2.0 sacks on the season.

In 2016, after being sought after for various defensive coordinator positions around the league, the Cowboys were able to keep Eberflus in house and made him the team's Defensive Passing Game Coordinator in addition to his linebacker coaching duties. Eberflus helped the Cowboys defense boast the NFL's No. 1 overall rushing defense (83.5 yards per game) in 2016, and the No. 5 ranked scoring defense. Sean Lee led the defense with 175 tackles (120 solo) and 12.0 tackles for loss, both career highs, and was named First Team All-Pro and selected to his second consecutive Pro Bowl.

In 2017, Eberflus guided a linebacker group that accounted for 34% of the team's tackles, helping the defense rank No. 8 in total defense (318.1 yards per game) and rushing defense (104.0 yards per game), and the No. 11 passing defense (214.1 yards per game). Most impressively, Eberflus was credited with the development of Jaylon Smith to become an immediate contributor after missing the 2016 season due to an injury he suffered in his final collegiate game at Notre Dame. In his first year on the field, Smith played in all 16 games, starting in six of them, tallying 81 tackles (50 solo), 3.0 tackles for loss, 1.0 sack, two passes defensed and two forced fumbles. In total, Eberflus's linebacker trio of Sean Lee (101 tackles), Anthony Hitchens (84 tackles) and Jaylon Smith (81 tackles) finished as the Cowboys' top-three tacklers. Both Lee and Smith have credited Eberflus for helping them excel at their positions.

=== Indianapolis Colts ===
With Josh McDaniels set to take the head coaching job with the Indianapolis Colts in 2018, Eberflus was hired to be his defensive coordinator. Just before McDaniels's hiring was officially announced, McDaniels withdrew his acceptance and chose to stay in New England. Eberflus nevertheless joined the Colts as defensive coordinator once Philadelphia Eagles' offensive coordinator Frank Reich was hired as the Colts' head coach in place of McDaniels. Although Eberflus and Reich had never met, Colts' General Manager Chris Ballard "was very persuasive and very strong in his conviction [to Reich] that Matt was the right guy." Eberflus was credited with instilling an "ultra-demanding culture of hustle, discipline and teamwork" that ultimately helped turn the Colts around from a 4–12 team in 2017 to a 10–6 playoff team in 2018, reaching the AFC Divisional Playoff Round.

Inheriting a defense that finished No. 30 in the NFL in both scoring defense (25.2 points allowed per game) and total defense (367.1 yards allowed per game) in 2017, Eberflus turned the defense around in just one season, to rank No. 10 in scoring defense (21.5 points allowed per game) and No. 11 in total defense (339.4 yards allowed per game) in 2018.

Eberflus's cultural impact and expertise in player development was put on display throughout the 2018 season, achieving the team's defensive heights without preeminent talent. The team's previous coaching staff advocated for cutting linebacker Anthony Walker before the year, but the front office resisted and he was retained. Under Eberflus, Walker became the team's second-leading tackler with 105 on the season (53 solo). Rookie Shaquille Leonard, a 2nd round pick out of South Carolina State, led the NFL with 163 tackles (93 solo), earning First Team All-Pro Honors and making the All-Rookie Team. Eberflus's improved the Colts rushing defense from No. 26 in 2017 (120.4 rushing yards allowed per game) to No. 8 in 2018 (101.6 rushing yards allowed per game). The Colts rushing defense allowed just 3.6 yards per carry, good for 6th in the NFL, and did not allow a single 100-yard rusher all season.

Eberflus also improved the Colts' passing defense from No. 28 in 2017 (246.6 passing yards allowed per game) to No. 16 in 2018 (237.8 passing yards allowed per game), doing so with their number one corner, Pierre Desir, already having been waived by three NFL teams since being drafted in 2014, and Kenny Moore II, who was an undrafted free agent out of Valdosta State the prior season.

Eberflus interviewed with the Cleveland Browns for their head coaching vacancy in 2019. The Browns decided to hire Freddie Kitchens instead, who was fired a year later. Eberflus continued with the Colts through the 2021 season.

=== Chicago Bears ===
On January 27, 2022, Eberflus was named the 17th head coach of the Chicago Bears. Eberflus won his head coaching debut on September 11, as the Bears beat the San Francisco 49ers by a score of 19–10 in a come-from-behind victory in the pouring rain. However, the Bears struggled the rest of the season, finishing with an NFL-worst 3–14 record.

Eberflus and the Bears extended their losing streak to a franchise record 14 games through the 2023 season. The team broke the streak with a Week 5 win against the Washington Commanders on October 5, 2023. Eberflus also took over defensive play calling duties after defensive coordinator Alan Williams resigned after Week 2. The defense generated 28 turnovers including a league-leading 22 interceptions. The Bears finished last in the division for the second consecutive year with a 7–10 finish.

The Bears earned two top ten picks in the 2024 NFL draft, with the first pick previously acquired from the Carolina Panthers, ultimately selecting quarterback Caleb Williams and wide receiver Rome Odunze with the first and ninth picks, respectively. With the further addition of trade acquisition Keenan Allen as well as free agents D'Andre Swift, Kevin Byard, and Gerald Everett, the Bears were expected to take a step forward in Eberflus' third season at the helm. However, after entering the bye week with a 4–2 record, the Bears dropped their next six games under Eberflus, which included several last-second losses including a 18–15 loss to the Washington Commanders off a last-second Hail Mary pass known as the Hail Maryland, a 20–19 loss to the Packers on a blocked game-winning field goal attempt, and a 30–27 overtime loss to the Vikings on a game-winning field goal. His last game as the Bears' head coach was a 23–20 Thanksgiving Day loss to the Detroit Lions in which his late-game decision to not take his team's final timeout was widely criticized. Eberflus was fired on November 29, 2024, becoming the first Bears head coach to be fired mid-season.

=== Dallas Cowboys (second stint) ===
On January 28, 2025, Eberflus returned to the Dallas Cowboys to be their defensive coordinator. On January 6, 2026, he was fired after the Cowboys posted one of the worst defenses in franchise history.

=== San Francisco 49ers ===
On March 5, 2026, Eberflus was hired by the San Francisco 49ers to serve as the team's assistant head coach under head coach Kyle Shanahan.

== Head coaching record ==
Team	Year	Regular season					Postseason			
Team	Year	Won	Lost	Ties	Win %	Finish	Won	Lost	Win %	Result
CHI	2022	3	14	0	.176	4th in NFC North	–	–	–	–
CHI	2023	7	10	0	.412	4th in NFC North	–	–	–	–
CHI	2024	4	8	0	.333	Fired	–	–	–	–
Total		14	32	0	.304		0	0	.000	

== Personal life ==
Eberflus is a Christian. He and his wife, Kelly, have two daughters.

== Awards and accolades ==
In 2018, NBC Sports' Peter King voted Eberflus Assistant Coach of the Year, as did Steve Serby of the New York Post. Eberflus ultimately finished third in votes for the 2018 Associated Press NFL Assistant Coach of the Year Award, with first place going to Vic Fangio.
