= 2022 Chicago Bears season =

103rd season in franchise history

- Owner: Virginia Halas McCaskey
- General manager: Ryan Poles
- Head coach: Matt Eberflus
- Home stadium: Soldier Field

Results
- Record: 3–14
- Division place: 4th NFC North
- Playoffs: Did not qualify
- Pro Bowlers: None

Uniform
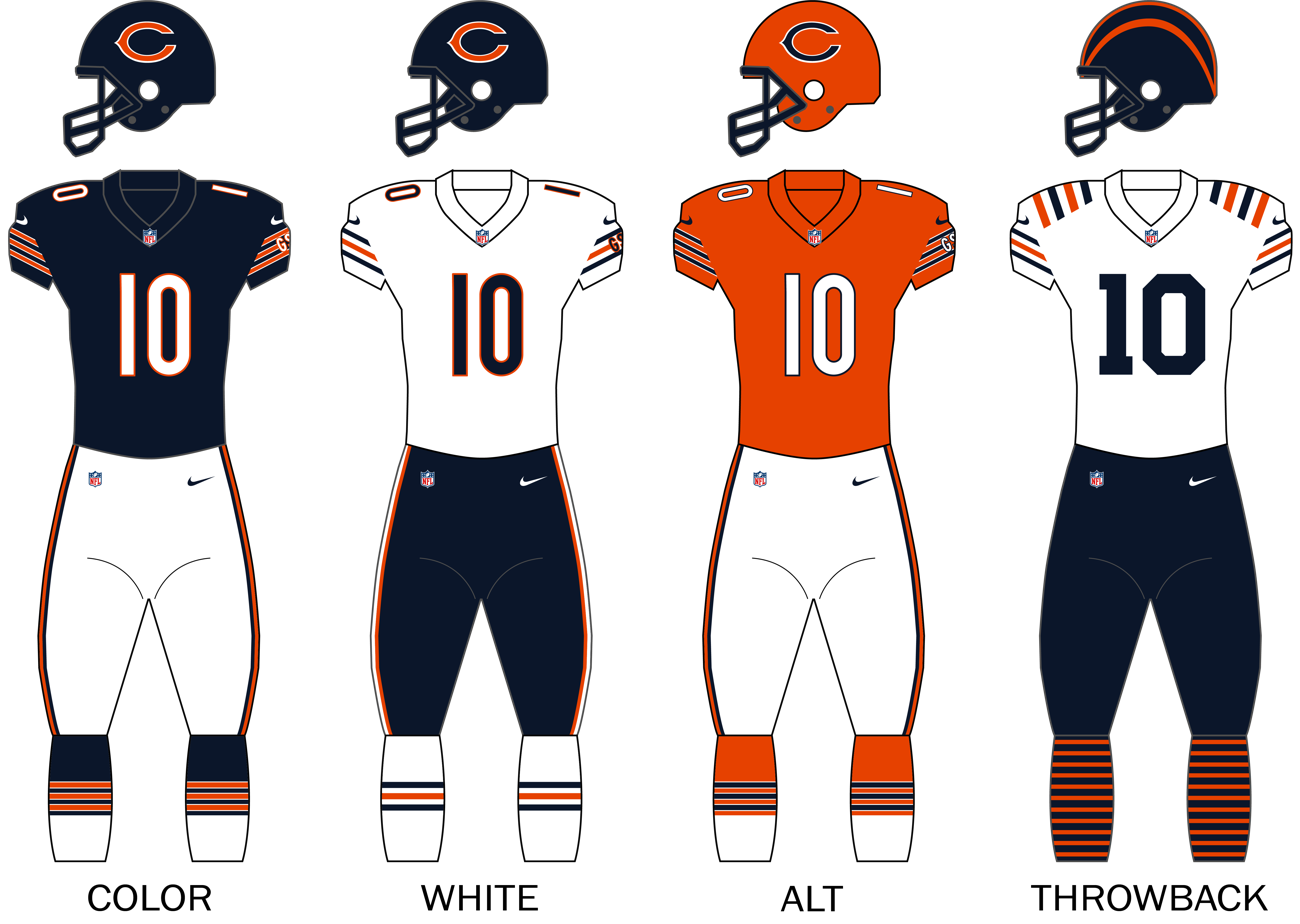

The 2022 season was the Chicago Bears' 103rd in the National Football League (NFL) and their first under general manager Ryan Poles and head coach Matt Eberflus. They failed to improve upon their 6–11 record from the previous season.

Despite starting with a 2–1 record, the Bears lost 13 of their last 14 games including a franchise-record 10-game losing streak to end the season. In Week 13, the Bears were eliminated from playoff contention for the second consecutive season and failed to improve on their 6–11 record from the previous season. With their Week 18 loss combined with a Houston win, the Bears secured the first overall pick in the 2023 NFL draft (which they later traded to Carolina for a package that included D. J. Moore and the eventual first overall pick in the 2024 NFL draft). The Bears set a franchise record with 14 losses. The Bears also failed to win a game against a divisional opponent for the third time in franchise history following the 1969 and 2017 seasons.

Despite the struggles, second-year quarterback Justin Fields had a breakout season, becoming the third quarterback in NFL history to rush for 1,000 yards in a season and setting the Bears' single-season quarterback rushing yards record. The Bears also led the league in rushing with 3,014 yards on 558 attempts, breaking their previous single-season record of 2,974 set in 1984.

== Offseason ==
=== Offseason changes ===
==== Head coach ====
The Chicago Bears fired fourth-year head coach Matt Nagy on January 10, 2022, who most notably led the organization to one NFC North title and two NFL Playoffs appearances among other accolades. On January 27, 2022, Indianapolis Colts defensive coordinator Matt Eberflus was hired as the 17th head coach in franchise history. Eberflus has planned to transitioned the Bears defense scheme from a 3–4 defense to a 4–3 defense.

==== General manager ====
The Chicago Bears fired seventh-year general manager Ryan Pace on January 10, 2022, who most notably led the organization to draft Eddie Jackson, Tarik Cohen, and Mitchell Trubisky. On January 25, 2022, Kansas City Chiefs executive director of player personnel Ryan Poles was named the general manager of the Bears.

==== Roster changes ====
The Chicago Bears made several moves in order to clear salary cap space, such as trading defensive end/outside linebacker Khalil Mack to the Los Angeles Chargers in exchange for a 2022 second round pick (48th overall; later used to draft Jaquan Brisker) and a sixth round pick in the 2023 NFL draft.

== Draft ==
2022 Chicago Bears Draft
Round	Selection	Player	Position	College	Notes
1	7	Traded to the New York Giants (Note: The Bears traded first- and fourth-round selections (7th and 112th overall), and 2021 first- and fourth-round selections to the New York Giants in exchange for a 2021 first-round selection.)			
2	39	Kyler Gordon	CB	Washington	
2	48	Jaquan Brisker	S	Penn State	from LA Chargers (Note: The Bears traded LB Khalil Mack to the Los Angeles Chargers in exchange for a second-round selection (48th overall) and a 2023 sixth-round selection.)
3	71	Velus Jones Jr.	WR	Tennessee	
4	112	Traded to the New York Giants			
5	148	Traded to Buffalo (Note: The Bears traded a fifth-round selection (148th overall) to the Buffalo Bills in exchange for fifth- and sixth-round selections (168th and 203rd overall).)			from Houston (Note: The Bears traded WR Anthony Miller and a seventh-round selection (228th overall) to the Houston Texans in exchange for a fifth-round selection (148th overall).)
5	150	Traded to Houston (Note: The Bears traded a fifth-round selection (150th overall) to the Houston Texans in exchange for fifth- and sixth-round selections (166th and 207th overall).)			
5	166	Traded to Cincinnati (Note: The Bears traded a fifth-round selection (166th overall) to the Cincinnati Bengals in exchange for fifth- and seventh-round selections (174th and 226th overall).)			from Arizona via Philadelphia and Houston
5	168	Braxton Jones	OT	Southern Utah	from Buffalo
5	174	Dominique Robinson	DE	Miami (OH)	from Cincinnati
6	186	Zachary Thomas	OT	San Diego State	
6	203	Trestan Ebner	RB	Baylor	from Bills
6	207	Doug Kramer	C	Illinois	from San Francisco via NY Jets and Houston
7	226	Ja'Tyre Carter	OT	Southern	from NY Giants via Cincinnati
7	228	Traded to Houston			
7	254	Elijah Hicks	S	California	from LA Chargers (Note: The Bears traded a 2023 sixth-round selection to the Los Angeles Chargers in exchange for two seventh-round selections (254th and 255th overall).)
7	255	Trenton Gill	P	NC State	from LA Chargers

Draft trades

2022 Chicago Bears undrafted free agents
Name	Position	College	Ref.
Christian Albright	LB	Ball State	
Jaylan Alexander	LB	Purdue	
Jon Alexander	S	Charlotte	
Chase Allen	TE	Iowa State	
C. J. Avery	LB	Louisville	
Amari Carter	S	Miami (FL)	
Jean Delance	OT	Florida	
Micah Dew-Treadway	DT	Minnesota	
Allie Green IV	CB	Missouri	
Cyrus Holder	WR	Duquesne	
Jaylon Jones	CB	Ole Miss	
Landon Lenoir	WR	Southern Illinois	
Henry Litwin	WR	Slippery Rock	
Antonio Ortiz	LS	TCU	
Jack Sanborn	LB	Wisconsin	
Savon Scarver	WR	Utah State	
Kevin Shaa	WR	Liberty	
Carson Taylor	DE	Northern Arizona	
Master Teague	RB	Ohio State	
A. J. Thomas	S	Western Michigan	
Jake Tonges	TE	California	
De'Montre Tuggle	RB	Ohio	

== Staff ==
2022 Chicago Bears staff
Front office: Secretary of the board of directors – Virginia Halas McCaskey; Chairman – George McCaskey; President/CEO – Ted Phillips; General manager – Ryan Poles; Assistant general manager – Ian Cunningham; Senior vice president/general counsel – Cliff Stein; Co-director of player personnel – Jeff King; Co-director of player personnel – Trey Koziol; Assistant director of pro scouting – Chris White; Assistant director of college scouting – Breck Ackley; Director of football administration – Matt Feinstein; Director of football research – Harrison Fried; Director of football analytics – Krithi Chandrakasan; Head coaches: Head coach – Matt Eberflus; Offensive coaches: Offensive coordinator – Luke Getsy; Quarterbacks – Andrew Janocko; Running backs – David Walker; Passing game coordinator/wide receivers – Tyke Tolbert; Tight ends – Jim Dray; Assistant tight ends – Tim Zetts; Offensive line – Chris Morgan; Assistant offensive line – Austin King; Offensive quality control – Omar Young	Defensive coaches: Defensive coordinator – Alan Williams; Defensive line – Travis Smith; Assistant defensive line – Justin Hinds; Linebackers – Dave Borgonzi; Defensive backs – James Rowe; Safeties – Andre Curtis; Assistant defensive backs – David Overstreet II; Defensive quality control – Ronell Williams; Special teams coaches: Special teams coordinator – Richard Hightower; Assistant special teams – Carlos Polk; Strength and conditioning: Director of high performance – Brent Salazar; Strength and conditioning – Jim Arthur; Assistant strength and conditioning – Noble Landry; Assistant strength and conditioning – Jim Mangiero

== Final roster ==
2022 Chicago Bears roster
Quarterbacks (QB): 17 Tim Boyle; 1 Justin Fields; 14 Nathan Peterman; Running backs (RB): 35 Khari Blasingame; 25 Trestan Ebner; 21 Darrynton Evans; 24 Khalil Herbert; 32 David Montgomery; Wide receivers (WR): 10 Chase Claypool; 8 N'Keal Harry; 12 Velus Jones Jr.; 18 Dante Pettis; 13 Byron Pringle; 19 Equanimeous St. Brown; Tight ends (TE): 84 Ryan Griffin; 85 Cole Kmet; 88 Trevon Wesco	Offensive linemen (OL): 75 Larry Borom T/G; 69 Ja'Tyre Carter G; 60 Dieter Eiselen G/C; 70 Braxton Jones T; 72 Alex Leatherwood T; 67 Sam Mustipher C; 71 Riley Reiff T; 65 Cody Whitehair G; Defensive linemen (DL): 9O Angelo Blackson DE; 94 Andrew Brown DT; 99 Trevis Gipson DE; 95 Jalyn Holmes DE; 93 Justin Jones DT; 53 Terrell Lewis DE; 55 Al-Quadin Muhammad DE; 64 Mike Pennel DT; 91 Dominique Robinson DE; 96 Armon Watts DT	Linebackers (LB): 44 Matthew Adams OLB; 43 DeMarquis Gates OLB; 47 Elijah Lee OLB; 53 Nicholas Morrow OLB; 45 Joe Thomas MLB/OLB; 50 Sterling Weatherford OLB; Defensive backs (DB): 20 Breon Borders CB; 9 Jaquan Brisker SS; 6 Kyler Gordon CB; 30 Harrison Hand CB; 37 Elijah Hicks FS; 36 DeAndre Houston-Carson FS/SS; 31 Jaylon Jones CB; 26 Michael Ojemudia CB; 38 A. J. Thomas SS; Special teams (ST): 16 Trenton Gill P; 2 Cairo Santos K; 48 Patrick Scales LS	Practice squad: 87 Chase Allen TE; 46 Andre Anthony DE (PS/I); 46 Kameron Canaday LS; 23 Adrian Colbert FS; 92 Trevon Coley DT; 49 Kuony Deng DE; 78 Kellen Diesch T; 82 Daurice Fountain WR; 98 Gerri Green DE; 63 Michael Niese C/G; 80 Sammis Reyes TE (IPP); 27 Greg Stroman CB; 81 Jake Tonges TE; 15 Nsimba Webster WR; Reserve: 39 Josh Blackwell CB (IR); 29 Dane Cruikshank SS (IR); 78 Dakota Dozier G (IR); 4 Eddie Jackson FS (IR); 76 Teven Jenkins G (IR); 33 Jaylon Johnson CB (IR); 68 Doug Kramer Jr. C (IR); 11 Darnell Mooney WR (IR); 62 Lucas Patrick G/C (IR); 57 Jack Sanborn MLB (IR); 73 Michael Schofield G (IR); 15 Trevor Siemian QB (IR); 22 Kindle Vildor CB (IR); Rookies in italics 53 active, 13 reserve, 13 practice squad (1 exempt)

== Preseason ==
Week	Date	Opponent	Result	Record	Venue	Recap
1	August 13	Kansas City Chiefs	W 19–14	1–0	Soldier Field	Recap
2	August 18	at Seattle Seahawks	W 27–11	2–0	Lumen Field	Recap
3	August 27	at Cleveland Browns	W 21–20	3–0	FirstEnergy Stadium	Recap

== Regular season ==
=== Schedule ===
The Bears' 2022 schedule was announced on May 12.

Week	Date	Opponent	Result	Record	Venue	Recap
1	September 11	San Francisco 49ers	**W** 19–10	1–0	Soldier Field	Recap
2	September 18	at **Green Bay Packers**	**L** 10–27	1–1	Lambeau Field	Recap
3	September 25	Houston Texans	**W** 23–20	2–1	Soldier Field	Recap
4	October 2	at New York Giants	**L** 12–20	2–2	MetLife Stadium	Recap
5	October 9	at **Minnesota Vikings**	**L** 22–29	2–3	U.S. Bank Stadium	Recap
6	October 13	Washington Commanders	**L** 7–12	2–4	Soldier Field	Recap
7	October 24	at New England Patriots	**W** 33–14	3–4	Gillette Stadium	Recap
8	October 30	at Dallas Cowboys	**L** 29–49	3–5	AT&T Stadium	Recap
9	November 6	Miami Dolphins	**L** 32–35	3–6	Soldier Field	Recap
10	November 13	**Detroit Lions**	**L** 30–31	3–7	Soldier Field	Recap
11	November 20	at Atlanta Falcons	**L** 24–27	3–8	Mercedes-Benz Stadium	Recap
12	November 27	at New York Jets	**L** 10–31	3–9	MetLife Stadium	Recap
13	December 4	**Green Bay Packers**	**L** 19–28	3–10	Soldier Field	Recap
14	Bye					
15	December 18	Philadelphia Eagles	**L** 20–25	3–11	Soldier Field	Recap
16	December 24	Buffalo Bills	**L** 13–35	3–12	Soldier Field	Recap
17	January 1	at **Detroit Lions**	**L** 10–41	3–13	Ford Field	Recap
18	January 8	**Minnesota Vikings**	**L** 13–29	3–14	Soldier Field	Recap
Notes: * Intra-division opponents are in **bold** text.

=== Game summaries ===
==== Week 1: vs. San Francisco 49ers ====
Week 1: San Francisco 49ers at Chicago Bears – Game summary

Quarter	1	2	3	4	Total
49ers	0	7	3	0	**10**
**Bears**	0	0	7	12	**19**

at Soldier Field, Chicago, Illinois

- Date: September 11
- Game time: 12:00 p.m. CDT
- Game weather: Cloudy, rain, 69 °F (21 °C)
- Game attendance: 62,159
- Referee: Clay Martin
- TV announcers (Fox): Joe Davis, Daryl Johnston and Pam Oliver
- Recap, Game Book

Game information

**First quarter**

- No scoring plays.

**Second quarter**

- SF – Deebo Samuel 6-yard run (Robbie Gould kick), 10:11. 49ers 7–0. **Drive: 7 plays, 52 yards, 3:32.**

**Third quarter**

- SF – Robbie Gould 25-yard field goal, 8:22. 49ers 10–0. **Drive: 11 plays, 68 yards, 6:38.**
- CHI – Dante Pettis 51-yard pass from Justin Fields (Cairo Santos kick), 5:32. 49ers 10–7. **Drive: 5 plays, 72 yards, 2:50.**

**Fourth quarter**

- CHI – Equanimeous St. Brown 18-yard pass from Justin Fields (kick failed, wide right), 12:45. Bears 13–10. **Drive: 10 plays, 84 yards, 3:52.**
- CHI – Khalil Herbert 3-yard run (kick failed, wide left), 7:21. Bears 19–10. **Drive: 5 plays, 21 yards, 2:21.**

**Top passers**

- SF – Trey Lance – 13/28, 164 yards, INT
- CHI – Justin Fields – 8/17, 121 yards, 2 TD, INT

**Top rushers**

- SF – Trey Lance – 13 rushes, 54 yards
- CHI – Khalil Herbert – 9 rushes, 45 yards, TD

**Top receivers**

- SF – Jauan Jennings – 4 receptions, 62 yards
- CHI – Dante Pettis – 1 reception, 51 yards, TD

With the sloppy win, the Bears started the season 1-0.

==== Week 2: at Green Bay Packers ====
Week 2: Chicago Bears at Green Bay Packers – Game summary

Quarter	1	2	3	4	Total
Bears	7	0	3	0	**10**
**Packers**	3	21	0	3	**27**

at Lambeau Field, Green Bay, Wisconsin

- Date: September 18
- Game time: 7:20 p.m. CDT
- Game weather: Cloudy, 73 °F (23 °C)
- Game attendance: 78,350
- Referee: Craig Wrolstad
- TV announcers (NBC): Mike Tirico, Cris Collinsworth and Melissa Stark
- Recap, Game Book

Game information

**First quarter**

- GB – Mason Crosby 40-yard field goal, 8:37. Packers 3–0. **Drive: 13 plays, 53 yards, 6:27**
- CHI – Justin Fields 3-yard run (Cairo Santos kick), 4:37. Bears 7–3. **Drive: 7 plays, 71 yards, 3:56**

**Second quarter**

- GB – Aaron Jones 15-yard run (Mason Crosby kick), 14:54. Packers 10–3. **Drive: 9 plays, 75 yards, 4:43**
- GB – Aaron Jones 8-yard pass from Aaron Rodgers (Mason Crosby kick), 4:36. Packers 17–3. **Drive: 9 plays, 54 yards, 5:35**
- GB – Allen Lazard 5 yard pass from Aaron Rodgers (Mson Crosby kick), 0:32. Packers 24–3. **Drive: 7 plays, 67 yards, 2:38**

**Third quarter**

- CHI – Cairo Santos 44-yard field goal, 5:16. Packers 24–10. **Drive: 7 plays, 43 yards, 4:02**

**Fourth quarter**

- GB – Mason Crosby 28-yard field goal, 2:31. Packers 27–10. **Drive: 10 plays, 89 yards, 5:39**

**Top passers**

- CHI – Justin Fields – 7/11, 70 yards, 1 INT
- GB – Aaron Rodgers – 19/25, 234 yards, 2 TD

**Top rushers**

- CHI – David Montgomery – 15 rushes, 122 yards
- GB – Aaron Jones – 15 rushes, 132 yards, TD

**Top receivers**

- CHI – Equanimeous St. Brown – 2 receptions, 39 yards
- GB – Sammy Watkins – 3 receptions, 93 yards

==== Week 3: vs. Houston Texans ====
Week 3: Houston Texans at Chicago Bears – Game summary

Quarter	1	2	3	4	Total
Texans	7	7	6	0	**20**
**Bears**	10	3	7	3	**23**

at Soldier Field, Chicago, Illinois

- Date: September 25
- Game time: 12:00 p.m. CDT
- Game weather: Cloudy, 66 °F (19 °C)
- Game attendance: 60,592
- Referee: Clete Blakeman
- TV announcers (CBS): Andrew Catalon, James Lofton and Michael Grady
- Recap, Game Book

Game information

**First quarter**

- CHI – Cairo Santos 47-yard field goal, 11:22. Bears 3–0. **Drive: 9 plays, 45 yards, 3:38.**
- CHI – Khalil Herbert 11-yard run (Cairo Santos kick), 6:45. Bears 10–0. **Drive: 6 plays, 81 yards, 3:16.**
- HOU – Jordan Akins 4-yard pass from Davis Mills (Kaʻimi Fairbairn kick), 3:40. Bears 10–7. **Drive: 7 plays, 75 yards, 3:05.**

**Second quarter**

- HOU – Dameon Pierce 1-yard run (Kaʻimi Fairbairn kick), 7:32. Texans 14–10. **Drive: 4 plays, 41 yards, 2:07.**
- CHI – Cairo Santos 50-yard field goal, 1:48. Texans 14–13. **Drive: 12 plays, 50 yards, 5:44.**

**Third quarter**

- HOU – Kaʻimi Fairbairn 39-yard field goal, 11:25. Texans 17–13. **Drive: 7 plays, 54 yards, 3:35.**
- CHI – Khalil Herbert 1-yard run (Cairo Santos kick), 8:25. Bears 20–17. **Drive: 5 plays, 75 yards, 3:00.**
- HOU – Kaʻimi Fairbairn 23-yard field goal, 0:54. Tied 20–20. **Drive: 14 plays, 70 yards, 7:31.**

**Fourth quarter**

- CHI – Cairo Santos 30-yard field goal, 0:00. Bears 23–20. **Drive: 4 plays, 0 yards, 1:05.**

**Top passers**

- HOU – Davis Mills – 20/32, 245 yards, TD, 2 INT
- CHI – Justin Fields – 8/17, 106 yards, 2 INT

**Top rushers**

- HOU – Dameon Pierce – 20 rushes, 80 yards, TD
- CHI – Khalil Herbert – 20 rushes, 157 yards, 2 TD

**Top receivers**

- HOU – Rex Burkhead – 4 receptions, 21 yards
- CHI – Cole Kmet – 2 receptions, 40 yards

==== Week 4: at New York Giants ====
Week 4: Chicago Bears at New York Giants – Game summary

Quarter	1	2	3	4	Total
Bears	6	3	3	0	**12**
**Giants**	7	7	3	3	**20**

at MetLife Stadium, East Rutherford, New Jersey

- Date: October 2
- Game time: 1:00 p.m. EDT/12:00 p.m. CDT
- Game weather: Overcast, 58 °F (14 °C)
- Game attendance: 74,044
- Referee: Carl Cheffers
- TV announcers (Fox): Joe Davis, Daryl Johnston and Pam Oliver
- Recap, Game Book

Game information

**First quarter**

- CHI – Michael Badgley 29-yard field goal, 8:27. Bears 3–0. **Drive: 10 plays, 65 yards, 5:17.**
- NYG – Daniel Jones 21-yard run (Graham Gano kick), 5:06. Giants 7–3. **Drive: 6 plays, 75 yards, 3:21.**
- CHI – Michael Badgley 22-yard field goal, 1:30. Giants 7–6. **Drive: 6 plays, 77 yards, 3:36.**

**Second quarter**

- NYG – Daniel Jones 8-yard run (Graham Gano kick), 5:17. Giants 14–6. **Drive: 7 plays, 75 yards, 4:15.**
- CHI – Michael Badgley 40-yard field goal, 1:44. Giants 14–9. **Drive: 7 plays, 13 yards, 2:04.**

**Third quarter**

- CHI – Michael Badgley 35-yard field goal, 11:02. Giants 14–12. **Drive: 9 plays, 58 yards, 3:58.**
- NYG – Graham Gano 44-yard field goal, 1:33. Giants 17–12. **Drive: 5 plays, 60 yards, 2:50.**

**Fourth quarter**

- NYG – Graham Gano 43-yard field goal, 5:31. Giants 20–12. **Drive: 13 plays, 54 yards, 6:34.**

**Top passers**

- CHI – Justin Fields – 11/22, 174 yards
- NYG – Daniel Jones – 8/13, 71 yards

**Top rushers**

- CHI – Khalil Herbert – 19 rushes, 77 yards
- NYG – Saquon Barkley – 31 rushes, 146 yards

**Top receivers**

- CHI – Darnell Mooney – 4 receptions, 94 yards
- NYG – Daniel Bellinger – 3 receptions, 23 yards

==== Week 5: at Minnesota Vikings ====
Week 5: Chicago Bears at Minnesota Vikings – Game summary

Quarter	1	2	3	4	Total
Bears	3	7	9	3	**22**
**Vikings**	7	14	0	8	**29**

at U.S. Bank Stadium, Minneapolis, Minnesota

- Date: October 9
- Game time: 12:00 p.m. CDT
- Game weather: None (indoor stadium)
- Game attendance: 66,929
- Referee: Shawn Hochuli
- TV announcers (Fox): Adam Amin, Mark Schlereth and Kristina Pink
- Recap, Game Book

Game information

**First quarter**

- MIN – Dalvin Cook 1-yard run (Greg Joseph kick), 8:15. Vikings 7–0. **Drive: 12 plays, 86 yards, 6:45.**
- CHI – Cairo Santos 50-yard field goal, 6:06. Vikings 7–3. **Drive: 6 plays, 44 yards, 2:09.**

**Second quarter**

- MIN – Dalvin Cook 5-yard run (Greg Joseph kick), 14:55. Vikings 14–3. **Drive: 11 plays, 75 yards, 6:11.**
- MIN – Jalen Reagor 1-yard pass from Kirk Cousins (Greg Joseph kick), 7:20. Vikings 21–3. **Drive: 9 plays, 71 yards, 6:17.**
- CHI – David Montgomery 9-yard run (Cairo Santos kick), 1:08. Vikings 21–10. **Drive: 4 plays, 50 yards, 0:46.**

**Third quarter**

- CHI – Velus Jones Jr. 9-yard pass from Justin Fields (pass failed), 10:24. Vikings 21–16. **Drive: 8 plays, 67 yards, 4:36.**
- CHI – Cairo Santos 43-yard field goal, 1:05. Vikings 21–19. **Drive: 11 plays, 34 yards, 6:29.**

**Fourth quarter**

- CHI – Cairo Santos 51-yard field goal, 9:26. Bears 22–21. **Drive: 7 plays, 19 yards, 3:18.**
- MIN – Kirk Cousins 1-yard run (Kirk Cousins–Justin Jefferson pass), 2:26. Vikings 29–22. **Drive: 17 plays, 75 yards, 7:00.**

**Top passers**

- CHI – Justin Fields – 15/21, 208 yards, TD
- MIN – Kirk Cousins – 32/41, 296 yards, TD, INT

**Top rushers**

- CHI – Justin Fields – 8 rushes, 47 yards
- MIN – Dalvin Cook – 18 rushes, 94 yards, 2 TD

**Top receivers**

- CHI – David Montgomery – 4 receptions, 62 yards
- MIN – Justin Jefferson – 12 receptions, 154 yards

==== Week 6: vs. Washington Commanders ====
Week 6: Washington Commanders at Chicago Bears – Game summary

Quarter	1	2	3	4	Total
**Commanders**	0	3	0	9	**12**
Bears	0	0	7	0	**7**

at Soldier Field, Chicago, Illinois

- Date: October 13
- Game time: 7:15 p.m. CDT
- Game weather: Cloudy, 46 °F (8 °C)
- Game attendance: 61,873
- Referee: Adrian Hill
- TV announcers (WFLD/Prime Video): Al Michaels, Kirk Herbstreit and Kaylee Hartung
- Recap, Game Book

Game information

**First quarter**

- No scoring plays.

**Second quarter**

- WAS – Joey Slye 38-yard field goal, 0:46. Commanders 3–0. **Drive: 9 plays, 57 yards, 1:37.**

**Third quarter**

- CHI – Dante Pettis 40-yard pass from Justin Fields (Cairo Santos kick), 7:16. Bears 7–3. **Drive: 9 plays, 94 yards, 3:57.**

**Fourth quarter**

- WAS – Joey Slye 28-yard field goal, 14:51. Bears 7–6. **Drive: 13 plays, 65 yards, 7:25.**
- WAS – Brian Robinson Jr. 1-yard run (pass failed), 7:21. Commanders 12–7. **Drive: 2 plays, 6 yards, 0:45.**

**Top passers**

- WAS – Carson Wentz – 12/22, 99 yards
- CHI – Justin Fields – 14/27, 190 yards, TD, INT

**Top rushers**

- WAS – Brian Robinson Jr. – 17 rushes, 60 yards, TD
- CHI – Justin Fields – 12 rushes, 88 yards

**Top receivers**

- WAS – Terry McLaurin – 3 receptions, 41 yards
- CHI – Dante Pettis – 4 receptions, 84 yards

==== Week 7: at New England Patriots ====
Week 7: Chicago Bears at New England Patriots – Game summary

Quarter	1	2	3	4	Total
**Bears**	10	10	6	7	**33**
Patriots	0	14	0	0	**14**

at Gillette Stadium, Foxborough, Massachusetts

- Date: October 24
- Game time: 8:15 p.m. EDT/7:15 p.m. CDT
- Game weather: Foggy, 56 °F (13 °C)
- Game attendance: 65,878
- Referee: Brad Allen
- TV announcers (WGN-TV/ESPN): Joe Buck, Troy Aikman and Lisa Salters
- Recap, Game Book

Game information

**First quarter**

- CHI – Cairo Santos 42-yard field goal, 9:02. Bears 3–0. **Drive: 8 plays, 42 yards, 3:52.**
- CHI – Justin Fields 3-yard run (Cairo Santos kick), 2:11. Bears 10–0. **Drive: 7 plays, 56 yards, 4:19.**

**Second quarter**

- NE – Jakobi Meyers 30-yard pass from Bailey Zappe (Nick Folk kick), 9:43. Bears 10–7. **Drive: 4 plays, 55 yards, 2:12.**
- NE – Rhamondre Stevenson 4-yard run (Nick Folk kick), 6:04. Patriots 14–10. **Drive: 3 plays, 50 yards, 1:30.**
- CHI – Khalil Herbert 25-yard pass from Justin Fields (Cairo Santos kick), 1:54. Bears 17–14. **Drive: 9 plays, 75 yards, 4:10.**
- CHI – Cairo Santos 23-yard field goal, 0:00. Bears 20–14. **Drive: 7 plays, 32 yards, 1:32.**

**Third quarter**

- CHI – Cairo Santos 38-yard field goal, 9:47. Bears 23–14. **Drive: 10 plays, 56 yards, 5:13.**
- CHI – Cairo Santos 50-yard field goal, 3:50. Bears 26–14. **Drive: 10 plays, 46 yards, 4:27.**

**Fourth quarter**

- CHI – David Montgomery 1-yard run (Cairo Santos kick), 12:13. Bears 33–14. **Drive: 8 plays, 39 yards, 4:48.**

**Top passers**

- CHI – Justin Fields – 13/21, 179 yards, TD, INT
- NE – Bailey Zappe – 14/22, 185 yards, TD, 2 INT

**Top rushers**

- CHI – Justin Fields – 14 rushes, 82 yards, TD
- NE – Rhamondre Stevenson – 11 rushes, 39 yards, TD

**Top receivers**

- CHI – Darnell Mooney – 3 receptions, 53 yards
- NE – DeVante Parker – 3 receptions, 68 yards

This was the first time in franchise history the Bears defeated the Pats on the road and their first overall win over New England since 2000 snapping a 4-game losing streak. This would end up being the Bears last win until Week 5 of 2023.

==== Week 8: at Dallas Cowboys ====
Week 8: Chicago Bears at Dallas Cowboys – Game summary

Quarter	1	2	3	4	Total
Bears	0	17	6	6	**29**
**Cowboys**	14	14	14	7	**49**

at AT&T Stadium, Arlington, Texas

- Date: October 30
- Game time: 12:00 p.m. CDT
- Game weather: 66 °F (19 °C) (retractable roof open)
- Game attendance: 93,767
- Referee: Brad Rogers
- TV announcers (Fox): Adam Amin, Daryl Johnston and Pam Oliver
- Recap, Game Book

Game information

**First quarter**

- DAL – Dak Prescott 7-yard run (Brett Maher kick), 10:18. Cowboys 7–0. **Drive: 11 plays, 75 yards, 4:42.**
- DAL – CeeDee Lamb 21-yard pass from Dak Prescott (Brett Maher kick), 5:19. Cowboys 14–0. **Drive: 8 plays, 69 yards, 3:12.**

**Second quarter**

- CHI – Justin Fields 3-yard run (Cairo Santos kick), 13:41. Cowboys 14–7. **Drive: 12 plays, 75 yards, 6:38.**
- DAL – Tony Pollard 18-yard run (Brett Maher kick), 10:50. Cowboys 21–7. **Drive: 6 plays, 75 yards, 2:51.**
- DAL – Jake Ferguson 1-yard pass from Dak Prescott (Brett Maher kick), 6:48. Cowboys 28–7. **Drive: 8 plays, 54 yards, 2:35.**
- CHI – N'Keal Harry 17-yard pass from Justin Fields (Cairo Santos kick), 0:40. Cowboys 28–14. **Drive: 12 plays, 75 yards, 6:08.**
- CHI – Cairo Santos 36-yard field goal, 0:00. Cowboys 28–17. **Drive: 4 plays, 6 yards, 0:28.**

**Third quarter**

- CHI – Khalil Herbert 12-yard run (pass failed), 9:42. Cowboys 28–23. **Drive: 5 plays, 62 yards, 2:19.**
- DAL – Tony Pollard 7-yard run (Brett Maher kick), 6:51. Cowboys 35–23. **Drive: 7 plays, 75 yards, 2:51.**
- DAL – Micah Parsons 36-yard fumble return (Brett Maher kick), 5:00. Cowboys 42–23.

**Fourth quarter**

- CHI – Cole Kmet 10-yard pass from Justin Fields (pass failed), 13:40. Cowboys 42–29. **Drive: 13 plays, 75 yards, 6:20.**
- DAL – Tony Pollard 54-yard run (Brett Maher kick), 10:35. Cowboys 49–29. **Drive: 5 plays, 79 yards, 3:05.**

**Top passers**

- CHI – Justin Fields – 17/23, 151 yards, 2 TD
- DAL – Dak Prescott – 21/27, 250 yards, 2 TD, INT

**Top rushers**

- CHI – Khalil Herbert – 16 rushes, 99 yards, TD
- DAL – Tony Pollard – 14 rushes, 131 yards, 3 TD

**Top receivers**

- CHI – Darnell Mooney – 5 receptions, 70 yards
- DAL – CeeDee Lamb – 5 receptions, 77 yards, TD

==== Week 9: vs. Miami Dolphins ====
Week 9: Miami Dolphins at Chicago Bears – Game summary

Quarter	1	2	3	4	Total
**Dolphins**	7	14	14	0	**35**
Bears	3	14	8	7	**32**

at Soldier Field, Chicago, Illinois

- Date: November 6
- Game time: 12:00 p.m. CST
- Game weather: Sunny, 62 °F (17 °C)
- Game attendance: 62,377
- Referee: Ronald Torbert
- TV announcers (CBS): Kevin Harlan, Trent Green and Melanie Collins
- Recap, Game Book

Game information

**First quarter**

- CHI – Cairo Santos 32-yard field goal, 11:03. Bears 3–0. **Drive: 8 plays, 61 yards, 3:57.**
- MIA – Raheem Mostert 1-yard run (Jason Sanders kick), 7:33. Dolphins 7–3. **Drive: 6 plays, 75 yards, 3:30.**

**Second quarter**

- CHI – Cole Kmet 18-yard pass from Justin Fields (Cairo Santos kick), 14:52. Bears 10–7. **Drive: 15 plays, 75 yards, 7:41.**
- MIA – Tyreek Hill 3-yard pass from Tua Tagovailoa (Jason Sanders kick), 10:39. Dolphins 14–10. **Drive: 7 plays, 75 yards, 4:13.**
- MIA – Andrew Van Ginkel 25-yard blocked punt return (Jason Sanders kick), 8:25. Dolphins 21–10.
- CHI – Darnell Mooney 16-yard pass from Justin Fields (Cairo Santos kick), 1:53. Dolphins 21–17. **Drive: 12 plays, 75 yards, 6:32.**

**Third quarter**

- MIA – Jaylen Waddle 18-yard pass from Tua Tagovailoa (Jason Sanders kick), 12:47. Dolphins 28–17. **Drive: 4 plays, 75 yards, 2:13.**
- CHI – Justin Fields 61-yard run (two point pass good), 11:20. Dolphins 28–25. **Drive: 3 plays, 66 yards, 1:27.**
- MIA – Jeff Wilson 10-yard pass from Tua Tagovailoa (Jason Sanders kick), 6:02. Dolphins 35–25. **Drive: 11 plays, 75 yards, 5:18.**

**Fourth quarter**

- CHI – Cole Kmet 4-yard pass from Justin Fields (Cairo Santos kick), 11:38. Dolphins 35–32. **Drive: 10 plays, 65 yards, 5:24.**

**Top passers**

- MIA – Tua Tagovailoa – 21/30, 302 yards, 3 TD
- CHI – Justin Fields – 17/28, 123 yards, 3 TD

**Top rushers**

- MIA – Jeff Wilson – 9 rushes, 51 yards
- CHI – Justin Fields – 15 rushes, 178 yards, TD

**Top receivers**

- MIA – Tyreek Hill – 7 receptions, 143 yards, TD
- CHI – Darnell Mooney – 7 receptions, 43 yards, TD

Bears quarterback Justin Fields set an NFL single-game regular season record for most rushing yards by a Quarterback at 178 rushing yards. This record surpassed Michael Vick. He also became the first QB in NFL history to throw for 3 touchdowns and have at least 150 rushing yards in 1 game and set a Bears franchise record for the longest rushing touchdown by a QB with a 61-yard touchdown run. For his efforts, Fields won NFC Offensive Player of the Week for Week 9.

==== Week 10: vs. Detroit Lions ====
Week 10: Detroit Lions at Chicago Bears – Game summary

Quarter	1	2	3	4	Total
**Lions**	3	7	0	21	**31**
Bears	3	7	14	6	**30**

at Soldier Field, Chicago, Illinois

- Date: November 13
- Game time: 12:00 p.m. CST
- Game weather: Scattered clouds, 34 °F (1 °C)
- Game attendance: 61,817
- Referee: Land Clark
- TV announcers (Fox): Kevin Kugler, Mark Sanchez and Laura Okmin
- Recap, Game Book

Game information

**First quarter**

- CHI – Cairo Santos 33-yard field goal, 10:39. Bears 3–0. **Drive: 8 plays, 60 yards, 4:21.**
- DET – Michael Badgley 25-yard field goal, 3:21. Tied 3–3. **Drive: 14 plays, 68 yards, 7:18.**

**Second quarter**

- DET – Brock Wright 2-yard pass from Jared Goff (Michael Badgley kick), 7:18. Lions 10–3. **Drive: 13 plays, 80 yards, 7:26.**
- CHI – Justin Fields 1-yard rush (Cairo Santos kick), 0:12. Tied 10–10. **Drive: 15 plays, 75 yards, 7:06.**

**Third quarter**

- CHI – Cole Kmet 6-yard pass from Justin Fields (Cairo Santos kick), 7:36. Bears 17–10. **Drive: 10 plays, 76 yards, 5:19.**
- CHI – Cole Kmet 50-yard pass from Justin Fields (Cairo Santos kick), 2:43. Bears 24–10. **Drive: 3 plays, 71 yards, 1:26.**

**Fourth quarter**

- DET – D'Andre Swift 9-yard rush (Michael Badgley kick), 11:37. Bears 24–17. **Drive: 4 plays, 55 yards, 1:58.**
- DET – Jeff Okudah 20-yard interception return (Michael Badgley kick), 10:29. Tied 24–24.
- CHI – Justin Fields 67-yard rush (Cairo Santos kick failed), 9:11. Bears 30–24. **Drive: 3 plays, 75 yards, 1:18.**
- DET – Jamaal Williams 1-yard rush (Michael Badgley kick), 2:21. Lions 31–30. **Drive: 8 plays, 81 yards, 3:02.**

**Top passers**

- DET – Jared Goff – 19/26, 236 yards, TD
- CHI – Justin Fields – 12/20, 167 yards, 2 TD, INT

**Top rushers**

- DET – Jamaal Williams – 16 rushes, 59 yards, TD
- CHI – Justin Fields – 13 rushes, 147 yards, 2 TD

**Top receivers**

- DET – Amon-Ra St. Brown – 10 receptions, 119 yards
- CHI – Cole Kmet – 4 receptions, 74 yards, 2 TD

With this loss, the Bears are the first team in NFL history to score at least 29 points in three consecutive games and lose all three. The Bears have lost to the Lions (scored 30 points), Miami Dolphins (scored 32 points) and Dallas Cowboys (scored 29 points) over the last three weeks.

==== Week 11: at Atlanta Falcons ====
Week 11: Chicago Bears at Atlanta Falcons – Game summary

Quarter	1	2	3	4	Total
Bears	7	10	0	7	**24**
**Falcons**	7	10	7	3	**27**

at Mercedes-Benz Stadium, Atlanta, Georgia

- Date: November 20
- Game time: 1:00 p.m. EST/12:00 p.m. CST
- Game weather: None (retractable roof closed)
- Game attendance: 69,757
- Referee: Tra Blake
- TV announcers (Fox): Joe Davis, Daryl Johnston and Pam Oliver
- Recap, Game Book

Game information

**First quarter**

- ATL – Drake London 2-yard pass from Marcus Mariota (Younghoe Koo kick), 9:37. Falcons 7–0. **Drive: 10 plays, 75 yards, 5:23.**
- CHI – Darnell Mooney 16-yard pass from Justin Fields (Cairo Santos kick), 6:02. Tied 7–7. **Drive: 7 plays, 44 yards, 3:35.**

**Second quarter**

- CHI – Cairo Santos 41-yard field goal, 7:42. Bears 10–7. **Drive: 7 plays, 47 yards, 3:55.**
- CHI – Justin Fields 4-yard run (Cairo Santos kick), 4:31. Bears 17–7. **Drive: 7 plays, 29 yards, 2:53.**
- ATL – Cordarrelle Patterson 103-yard kickoff return (Younghoe Koo kick), 4:18. Bears 17–14. **Drive: 0 plays, 0 yards, 0:13.**
- CHI – Younghoe Koo 40-yard field goal, 0:00. Tied 17–17. **Drive: 7 plays, 32 yards, 1:10.**

**Third quarter**

- ATL – Marcus Mariota 10-yard run (Younghoe Koo kick), 1:48. Falcons 24–17. **Drive: 6 plays, 61 yards, 3:27.**

**Fourth quarter**

- CHI – David Montgomery 2-yard run (Cairo Santos kick), 8:16. Tied 24–24. **Drive: 13 plays, 75 yards, 8:32.**
- ATL – Younghoe Koo 53-yard field goal, 1:47. Falcons 27–24. **Drive: 12 plays, 40 yards, 6:29.**

**Top passers**

- CHI – Justin Fields – 14/21, 153 yards, TD, INT
- ATL – Marcus Mariota – 13/20, 131 yards, TD

**Top rushers**

- CHI – Justin Fields – 18 rushes, 85 yards, TD
- ATL – Tyler Allgeier – 8 rushes, 55 yards

**Top receivers**

- CHI – David Montgomery – 3 receptions, 54 yards
- ATL – Kyle Pitts – 3 reception, 43 yards

==== Week 12: at New York Jets ====
Week 12: Chicago Bears at New York Jets – Game summary

Quarter	1	2	3	4	Total
Bears	3	7	0	0	**10**
**Jets**	7	10	14	0	**31**

at MetLife Stadium, East Rutherford, New Jersey

- Date: November 27
- Game time: 1:00 p.m. EST/12:00 p.m. CST
- Game weather: Rain, 52 °F (11 °C)
- Game attendance: 77,963
- Referee: John Hussey
- TV announcers (Fox): Joe Davis, Daryl Johnston and Pam Oliver
- Recap, Game Book

Game information

**First quarter**

- NYJ – Garrett Wilson 8-yard pass from Mike White (Greg Zuerlein kick), 10:12. Jets 7–0. **Drive: 9 plays, 75 yards, 4:48.**
- CHI – Cairo Santos 22-yard field goal, 5:59. Jets 7–3. **Drive: 9 plays, 71 yards, 4:13.**

**Second quarter**

- CHI – Byron Pringle 4-yard pass from Trevor Siemian (Cairo Santos kick). Bears 10–7. **Drive: 9 plays, 71 yards, 4:51.**
- NYJ – Garrett Wilson 54-yard pass from Mike White (Greg Zuerlein kick), 5:09. Jets 14–10. **Drive: 4 plays, 78 yards, 2:14.**
- NYJ – Greg Zuerlein 57-yard field goal, 0:12. Jets 17–10. **Drive: 9 plays, 34 yards, 3:27.**

**Third quarter**

- NYJ – Elijah Moore 22-yard pass from Mike White (Greg Zuerlein kick), 6:39. Jets 24–10. **Drive: 6 plays, 53 yards, 3:24.**
- NYJ – Ty Johnson 32-yard rush (Greg Zuerline kick), 2:30. Jets 31–10. **Drive: 4 plays, 79 yards, 1:51.**

**Fourth quarter**

- No scoring plays.

**Top passers**

- CHI – Trevor Siemian – 14/25, 179 yards, TD, INT
- NYJ – Mike White – 22/28, 315 yards, 3 TD

**Top rushers**

- CHI – David Montgomery – 14 rushes, 79 yards
- NYJ – Zonovan Knight – 14 rushes, 69 yards

**Top receivers**

- CHI – Chase Claypool – 2 receptions, 51 yards
- NYJ – Garrett Wilson – 5 receptions, 95 yards, 2 TD

==== Week 13: vs. Green Bay Packers ====
Week 13: Green Bay Packers at Chicago Bears – Game summary

Quarter	1	2	3	4	Total
**Packers**	0	10	0	18	**28**
Bears	10	6	3	0	**19**

at Soldier Field, Chicago, Illinois

- Date: December 4
- Game time: 12:00 p.m. CST
- Game weather: Sunny, 34 °F (1 °C)
- Game attendance: 61,233
- Referee: Scott Novak
- TV announcers (Fox): Adam Amin, Mark Schlereth and Kristina Pink
- Recap, Game Book

Game information

**First quarter**

- CHI – Cairo Santos 40-yard field goal, 9:23. Bears 3–0. **Drive: 11 plays, 53 yards, 5:37.**
- CHI – Justin Fields 46-yard rush (Cairo Santos kick), 3:00. Bears 10–0. **Drive: 5 plays, 70 yards, 2:39.**

**Second quarter**

- GB – Mason Crosby 24-yard field goal, 10:22. Bears 10–3. **Drive: 13 plays, 64 yards, 7:38.**
- CHI – David Montgomery 7-yard rush (kick failed), 6:09. Bears 16–3. **Drive: 2 plays, 63 yards, 0:57.**
- GB – Christian Watson 14-yard pass from Aaron Rodgers (Mason Crosby kick), 0:17. Bears 16–10. **Drive: 13 plays, 75 yards, 5:52.**

**Third quarter**

- CHI – Cairo Santos 28-yard field goal, 1:50. Bears 19–10. **Drive: 12 plays, 62 yards, 8:01.**

**Fourth quarter**

- GB – A. J. Dillon 21-yard rush, 14:41. Bears 19–17. **Drive: 4 plays, 82 yards, 2:09.**
- GB – Mason Crosby 32-yard field goal, 4:49. Packers 20–19. **Drive: 13 plays, 56 yards, 6:51.**
- GB – Christian Watson 46-yard rush (Aaron Rodgers-Marcedes Lewis pass), 1:51. Packers 28–19. **Drive: 3 plays, 68 yards, 1:01.**

**Top passers**

- GB – Aaron Rodgers – 18/31, 182 yards, TD
- CHI – Justin Fields – 20/25, 254 yards, 2 INT

**Top rushers**

- GB – A. J. Dillon – 18 rushes, 93 yards, TD
- CHI – Justin Fields – 6 rushes, 71 yards, TD

**Top receivers**

- GB – Allen Lazard – 5 receptions, 67 yards
- CHI – Equanimous St. Brown – 3 receptions, 85 yards

With their 8th straight loss to Green Bay, the Bears no longer hold the record of most wins in NFL history, which they have had since 1921, with the Packers taking over. The loss, along with Giants and Commanders tying, the Bears were eliminated from the playoffs for the second straight season and for the tenth time in 12 seasons.

==== Week 15: vs. Philadelphia Eagles ====
Week 15: Philadelphia Eagles at Chicago Bears – Game summary

Quarter	1	2	3	4	Total
**Eagles**	0	10	7	8	**25**
Bears	0	6	7	7	**20**

at Soldier Field, Chicago, Illinois

- Date: December 18
- Game time: 12:00 p.m. CST
- Game weather: Sunny, 18 °F (−8 °C)
- Game attendance: 48,423
- Referee: Brad Rogers
- TV announcers (Fox): Joe Davis, Daryl Johnston and Pam Oliver
- Recap, Game Book

Game information

**First quarter**

- No scoring plays.

**Second quarter**

- PHI – Jake Elliott 32-yard field goal, 11:50. Eagles 3–0. **Drive: 9 plays, 67 yards, 3:02.**
- CHI – David Montgomery 9-yard run (kick failed), 6:47. Bears 6–3. **Drive: 8 play, 75 yards, 5:03.**
- PHI – Jalen Hurts 22-yard run (Jake Elliott kick), 0:43. Eagles 10–6. **Drive: 9 plays, 91 yards, 2:06.**

**Third quarter**

- PHI – Jalen Hurts 1-yard run (Jake Elliott kick), 12:19. Eagles 17–6. **Drive: 6 plays, 42 yards, 2:41.**
- CHI – David Montgomery 10-yard pass from Justin Fields (Cairo Santos kick), 8:45. Eagles 17–13. **Drive: 3 play, 15 yards, 1:22.**

**Fourth quarter**

- PHI – Jalen Hurts 1-yard run (Jalen Hurts run), 4:20. Eagles 25–13. **Drive: 6 plays, 75 yards, 2:27.**
- CHI – Byron Pringle 35-yard pass from Justin Fields (Cairo Santos kick), 2:43. Eagles 25–20. **Drive: 6 plays, 60 yards, 1:37.**

**Top passers**

- PHI – Jalen Hurts – 22/37, 315 yards, 2 INT
- CHI – Justin Fields – 14/21, 152 yards, 2 TD

**Top rushers**

- PHI – Jalen Hurts – 17 rushes, 61 yards, 3 TD
- CHI – Justin Fields – 15 rushes, 91 yards

**Top receivers**

- PHI – A. J. Brown – 9 receptions, 181 yards
- CHI – Byron Pringle – 2 receptions, 39 yards, TD

With this loss, the Bears have dropped 7 straight, the 2nd longest losing streak in franchise history. Justin Fields also broke the team's single season QB rushing yards record set in 1972 by Bobby Douglass, now with 143 carries for 1,000 yards and 8 Touchdowns.

==== Week 16: vs. Buffalo Bills ====
Week 16: Buffalo Bills at Chicago Bears – Game summary

Quarter	1	2	3	4	Total
**Bills**	6	0	15	14	**35**
Bears	7	3	0	3	**13**

at Soldier Field, Chicago, Illinois

- Date: December 24
- Game time: 12:00 p.m. CST
- Game weather: Mostly sunny, 9 °F (−13 °C)
- Game attendance: 59,929
- Referee: Carl Cheffers
- TV announcers (CBS): Greg Gumbel, Adam Archuleta and AJ Ross
- Recap, Game Book

Game information

**First quarter**

- CHI – Dante Pettis 6-yard pass from Justin Fields (Cairo Santos kick), 9:41. Bears 7–0. **Drive: 8 plays, 64 yards, 5:19.**
- BUF – Gabe Davis 19-yard pass from Josh Allen (kick failed), 6:22. Bears 7–6. **Drive: 6 plays, 71 yards, 3:19.**

**Second quarter**

- CHI – Cairo Santos 37-yard field goal, 3:21. Bears 10–6. **Drive: 8 plays, 19 yards, 4:32.**

**Third quarter**

- BUF – Devin Singletary 33-yard run (Josh Allen–Khalil Shakir pass), 10:51. Bills 14–10. **Drive: 8 plays, 86 yards, 4:09.**
- BUF – James Cook 27-yard run (Tyler Bass kick), 7:57. Bills 21–10. **Drive: 3 plays, 35 yards, 0:47.**

**Fourth quarter**

- CHI – Cairo Santos 35-yard field goal, 10:19. Bills 21–13. **Drive: 4 plays, 1 yard, 1:54.**
- BUF – Josh Allen 4-yard run (Tyler Bass kick), 3:45. Bills 28–13. **Drive: 8 plays, 56 yards, 3:36.**
- BUF – Dawson Knox 13-yard pass from Josh Allen (Tyler Bass kick), 1:02. Bills 35–13. **Drive: 4 plays, 20 yards, 1:06.**

**Top passers**

- BUF – Josh Allen – 15/26, 172 yards, 2 TD, 2 INT
- CHI – Justin Fields – 15/23, 119 yards, TD

**Top rushers**

- BUF – Devin Singletary – 12 rushes, 106 yards, TD
- CHI – David Montgomery – 16 rushes, 62 yards

**Top receivers**

- BUF – Gabe Davis – 3 receptions, 45 yards, TD
- CHI – Velus Jones Jr. – 2 receptions, 52 yards

==== Week 17: at Detroit Lions ====
Week 17: Chicago Bears at Detroit Lions – Game summary

Quarter	1	2	3	4	Total
Bears	10	0	0	0	**10**
**Lions**	7	17	14	3	**41**

at Ford Field, Detroit, Michigan

- Date: January 1
- Game time: 1:00 p.m. EST/12:00 p.m. CST
- Game weather: None (indoor stadium)
- Game attendance: 66,169
- Referee: Adrian Hill
- TV announcers (Fox): Kenny Albert, Jonathan Vilma and Shannon Spake
- Recap, Game Book

Game information

**First quarter**

- CHI – Cole Kmet 13-yard pass from Justin Fields (Cairo Santos kick), 10:54. Bears 7–0. **Drive: 9 plays, 75 yards, 4:06.**
- DET – Brock Wright 2-yard pass from Jared Goff (Michael Badgley kick), 6:45. Tied 7–7. **Drive: 9 plays, 75 yards, 4:09.**
- CHI – Cairo Santos 23-yard field goal, 2:26. Bears 10–7. **Drive: 7 plays, 70 yards, 4:19.**

**Second quarter**

- DET – D'Andre Swift 17-yard run (Michael Badgley kick), 14:24. Lions 14–10. **Drive: 6 plays, 75 yards, 3:02.**
- DET – Brock Wright 9-yard pass from Jared Goff (Michael Badgley kick), 4:16. Lions 21–10. **Drive: 9 plays, 63 yards, 5:04.**
- DET – Michael Badgley 23-yard field goal, 0:17. Lions 24–10. **Drive: 8 plays, 46 yards, 2:33.**

**Third quarter**

- DET – Jamaal Williams 2-yard run (Michael Badgley kick), 11:38. Lions 31–10. **Drive: 6 plays, 75 yards, 3:22.**
- DET – D'Andre Swift 21-yard pass from Jared Goff (Michael Badgley kick), 6:36. Lions 38–10. **Drive: 7 plays, 92 yards, 3:56.**

**Fourth quarter**

- DET – Michael Badgley 41-yard field goal, 2:40. Lions 41–10. **Drive: 5 plays, 47 yards, 2:31.**

**Top passers**

- CHI – Justin Fields – 7/21, 75 yards, TD, INT
- DET – Jared Goff – 21/29, 255 yards, 3 TD

**Top rushers**

- CHI – Justin Fields – 10 rushes, 132 yards
- DET – Jamaal Williams – 22 rushes, 144 yards, TD

**Top receivers**

- CHI – Cole Kmet – 2 receptions, 27 yards, TD
- DET – Amon-Ra St. Brown – 4 receptions, 62 yards

Despite having a 10–7 lead, the Bears were held scoreless the rest of the game, allowing the Lions to score 34 unanswered points in the process. The Bears lost their ninth straight, swept by Detroit for the first time since 2017, and will finish dead last in the NFC.

==== Week 18: vs. Minnesota Vikings ====
Week 18: Minnesota Vikings at Chicago Bears – Game summary

Quarter	1	2	3	4	Total
**Vikings**	6	10	7	6	**29**
Bears	0	6	7	0	**13**

at Soldier Field, Chicago, Illinois

- Date: January 8
- Game time: 12:00 p.m. CST
- Game weather: Mostly cloudy, 34 °F (1 °C)
- Game attendance: 60,007
- Referee: Brad Allen
- TV announcers (Fox): Kenny Albert, Jonathan Vilma and Shannon Spake
- Recap, Game Book

Game information

**First quarter**

- MIN – Adam Thielen 4-yard pass from Kirk Cousins (kick failed, wide right), 10:12. Vikings 6–0. **Drive: 4 plays, 73 yards, 2:17.**

**Second quarter**

- MIN – Alexander Mattison 1-yard run (Greg Joseph kick), 9:20. Vikings 13–0. **Drive: 12 plays, 66 yards, 6:29.**
- MIN – Greg Joseph 28-yard field goal, 4:57. Vikings 16–0. **Drive: 6 plays, 25 yards, 3:22.**
- CHI – Velus Jones Jr. 42-yard run (pass failed), 3:31. Vikings 16–6. **Drive: 3 plays, 75 yards, 1:26.**

**Third quarter**

- MIN – Alexander Mattison 1-yard run (Greg Joseph kick), 9:25. Vikings 23–6. **Drive: 11 plays, 75 yards, 5:35.**
- CHI – Cole Kmet 11-yard pass from Nathan Peterman (Cairo Santos kick), 4:07. Vikings 23–13. **Drive: 10 plays, 75 yards, 5:18.**

**Fourth quarter**

- MIN – Greg Joseph 50-yard field goal, 14:55. Vikings 26–13. **Drive: 8 plays, 43 yards, 4:12.**
- MIN – Greg Joseph 41-yard field goal, 3:39. Vikings 29–13. **Drive: 9 plays, 36 yards, 3:35.**

**Top passers**

- MIN – Kirk Cousins – 17/20, 225 yards, TD
- CHI – Nathan Peterman – 11/19, 114 yards, TD

**Top rushers**

- MIN – Alexander Mattison – 10 rushes, 54 yards, 2 TD
- CHI – Khalil Herbert – 10 rushes, 50 yards

**Top receivers**

- MIN – K. J. Osborn – 5 receptions, 117 yards
- CHI – Cole Kmet – 4 receptions, 57 yards, TD

With this loss, the Bears have now lost seven straight home games, 10 straight overall, both new franchise records. Houston's win over the Colts also ensured the Bears would finish dead last in the NFL, thus earning the #1 pick for the 2023 draft. This also marked the first time since 2017 the Bears were swept by the NFC North.

=== Standings ===
==== Division ====
NFC North
	W	L	T	PCT	DIV	CONF	PF	PA	STK
^{(3)} Minnesota Vikings	13	4	0	.765	4–2	8–4	424	427	W1
Detroit Lions	9	8	0	.529	5–1	7–5	453	427	W2
Green Bay Packers	8	9	0	.471	3–3	6–6	370	371	L1
Chicago Bears	3	14	0	.176	0–6	1–11	326	463	L10

==== Conference ====
NFC
#	Team	Division	W	L	T	PCT	DIV	CONF	SOS	SOV	STK
**Division leaders**
1	Philadelphia Eagles	East	14	3	0	.824	4–2	9–3	.474	.460	W1
2 (Note: San Francisco claimed the No. 2 seed over Minnesota based on conference record (10–2 vs. 8–4).)	San Francisco 49ers	West	13	4	0	.765	6–0	10–2	.417	.414	W10
3	Minnesota Vikings	North	13	4	0	.765	4–2	8–4	.474	.425	W1
4	Tampa Bay Buccaneers	South	8	9	0	.471	4–2	8–4	.503	.426	L1
**Wild cards**
5	Dallas Cowboys	East	12	5	0	.706	4–2	8–4	.507	.485	L1
6	New York Giants	East	9	7	1	.559	1–4–1	4–7–1	.526	.395	L1
7 (Note: Seattle finished ahead of Detroit based on head-to-head victory, claiming the 7th and final playoff spot.)	Seattle Seahawks	West	9	8	0	.529	4–2	6–6	.462	.382	W2
**Did not qualify for the postseason**
8	Detroit Lions	North	9	8	0	.529	5–1	7–5	.535	.451	W2
9	Washington Commanders	East	8	8	1	.500	2–3–1	5–6–1	.536	.449	W1
10	Green Bay Packers	North	8	9	0	.471	3–3	6–6	.524	.449	L1
11 (Note: Carolina finished ahead of New Orleans and Atlanta based on head-to-head record (3–1 vs. 2–2/1–3).)	Carolina Panthers	South	7	10	0	.412	4–2	6–6	.474	.437	W1
12 (Note: New Orleans finished ahead of Atlanta based on head-to-head sweep.)	New Orleans Saints	South	7	10	0	.412	2–4	5–7	.507	.462	L1
13	Atlanta Falcons	South	7	10	0	.412	2–4	6–6	.467	.429	W2
14	Los Angeles Rams	West	5	12	0	.294	1–5	3–9	.517	.341	L2
15	Arizona Cardinals	West	4	13	0	.235	1–5	3–9	.529	.368	L7
16	Chicago Bears	North	3	14	0	.176	0–6	1–11	.571	.480	L10
**Tiebreakers** (Note: When breaking ties for three or more teams under the NFL's rules, they are first broken within divisions, then comparing only the highest-ranked remaining team from each division.)
