= Cole Kmet =

American football player (born 1999)

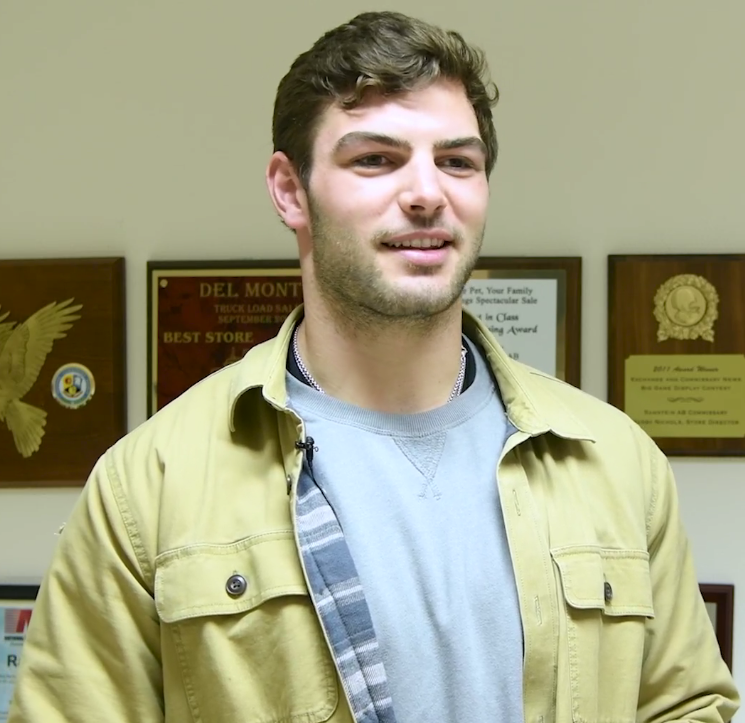
- Kmet in 2023

No. 85 – Chicago Bears
- Position: Tight end
- Roster status: Injured reserve

Personal information
- Born: March 10, 1999 (age 27); Lake Barrington, Illinois, U.S.
- Listed height: 6 ft 6 in (1.98 m)
- Listed weight: 257 lb (117 kg)

Career information
- High school: St. Viator (Arlington Heights, Illinois)
- College: Notre Dame (2017–2019)
- NFL draft: 2020: 2nd round, 43rd overall pick

Career history
- Chicago Bears (2020–present)

Career NFL statistics as of 2026
- Receptions: 298
- Receiving yards: 3,026
- Receiving touchdowns: 22
- Stats at Pro Football Reference

Cole Kmet (/ˌkəˈmɛt/ kə-MET; born March 10, 1999) is an American professional football tight end for the Chicago Bears of the National Football League (NFL). He played college football for the Notre Dame Fighting Irish, and was selected by the Bears in the second round of the 2020 NFL draft.

== Early life ==
Kmet attended St. Viator High School in Arlington Heights, Illinois. He played baseball and football in high school. As a senior in football, he had 48 receptions for 773 yards and four touchdowns. Kmet played in the 2017 U.S. Army All-American Bowl. He committed to the University of Notre Dame to play college football.

Before the 2017 Major League Baseball draft, Kmet worked out with the Chicago White Sox.

== College career ==
=== Football ===
As a true freshman at Notre Dame in 2017, Kmet played in all 13 games and had two receptions for 14 yards. As a sophomore in 2018, he played in 11 games and had 15 receptions for 162 yards. Kmet took over as the starting tight end his junior year in 2019. He missed the first three games of the season due to a broken collarbone. In November, he announced that he would return to Notre Dame for his senior season rather than enter the 2020 NFL draft.

On January 2, 2020, Kmet announced he would forgo his senior season at Notre Dame and would enter the 2020 NFL Draft.

=== Baseball ===
Kmet also played baseball at Notre Dame. As a freshman in 2018, Kmet appeared in 26 games as a relief pitcher and made one start. He finished the season 2–5 with a 5.05 earned run average (ERA), 39 strikeouts and a team-leading eight saves. As a sophomore in 2019, Kmet appeared in eight games with one start, before suffering an arm injury. He finished the season 0–2 with a 2.89 ERA and 27 strikeouts.

In the NFL, Kmet adopted a touchdown celebration that referenced his baseball career in which he pretended to hit a home run. He would also be occasionally joined by teammates, fans, or stadium workers posing as pitchers and outfielders.

== Professional career ==
=== NFL draft ===
Pre-draft measurables
Height	Weight	Arm length	Hand span	Wingspan	40-yard dash	10-yard split	20-yard split	20-yard shuttle	Three-cone drill	Vertical jump	Broad jump
6 ft 5 3/4 in (1.97 m)	262 lb (119 kg)	33 in (0.84 m)	10 1/2 in (0.27 m)	6 ft 7 in (2.01 m)	4.70 s	1.60 s	2.77 s	4.41 s	7.44 s	37.0 in (0.94 m)	10 ft 3 in (3.12 m)
All values from NFL Combine

Considered a top tight end prospect for the 2020 NFL draft, CBS Sports ranked him as the best tight end in the draft, while Pro Football Focus ranked him as the second-best. He was projected as a second-round pick.

The Chicago Bears selected him in the second round with the 43rd overall pick, which was previously acquired from the Las Vegas Raiders along with Khalil Mack as part of the trade that sent two first-round picks (Josh Jacobs and Damon Arnette) to the Raiders. He signed a four-year rookie contract with the team on July 21.

=== 2020 season ===
Kmet began his rookie season primarily as a blocker. In Week 2 against the New York Giants, he recorded his first NFL reception with a 12-yard catch, followed by his first touchdown four games later against the Carolina Panthers on a nine-yard score in the 23–16 victory.

=== 2021 season ===
Kmet appeared in all 17 games for the Bears and caught 60 passes for 612 yards during the 2021 season.

=== 2022 season ===
New Bears offensive coordinator Luke Getsy was optimistic about Kmet, who did not catch a touchdown pass in 2021. He commented on Kmet's versatility stating, "You talk about a guy that we hope can do a lot of different things. We’ve lined him up wide. We've let him do some routes outside. We've brought him in tight. We've put him in line and made him block the big boys up front too and I think the cool part about him is that he can do all of that stuff really well."

During the 2022 season, Kmet recorded 50 receptions for 544 yards and seven touchdowns. He led the Bears in receptions, receiving touchdowns, and receiving yards.

=== 2023 season ===
On July 26, 2023, Kmet signed a four-year, $50 million contract extension with the Bears.

He appeared in all 17 games for the Bears and finished the season with 73 receptions for 719 yards and six touchdowns. Kmet was also occasionally used for quarterback sneaks in which he directly took the snap from the center.

=== 2024 season ===
On October 13, 2024, against the Jacksonville Jaguars, Kmet had 5 receptions for 70 yards and 2 touchdowns. In the same game, Kmet also snapped six long snaps as the emergency long snapper after starter Scott Daly suffered a knee injury, uniquely earning him NFC Special Teams Player of the Week.

He finished the 2024 season with 47 receptions for 474 yards and four touchdowns. However, Kmet was also targeted a career-low 55 times amid the offense's struggles.

=== 2025 season ===
The Bears selected tight end Colston Loveland in the first round of the 2025 NFL draft, which Kmet admitted he was "taken back a little bit" by before being reassured by new head coach Ben Johnson that Loveland would be a complement to him. Entering the 2025 season, Kmet was the longest-tenured Bear on the roster.

Kmet was the starting tight end ahead of Loveland at the start of the season. He missed the Week 8 game against the Baltimore Ravens due to a back injury. In the following week's win over the Cincinnati Bengals, Johnson had Kmet take the snap for a trick play in which he pitched to quarterback Caleb Williams, who lateraled back to Kmet to set up a double pass only for Kmet's throw to Rome Odunze to be dropped. Kmet subsequently left the game with a concussion.

In the divisional round against the Los Angeles Rams, Kmet caught the game-tying touchdown from Williams on fourth down. With 27 seconds remaining from the Rams' 14-yard line, Williams immediately faced pressure and ran back to the 40 while Kmet got open after grappling with Rams cornerback Cobie Durant in the end zone. Kmet called the play a "pretty easy pitch-and-catch and kind of felt like it was in slow motion". While the score forced overtime, the Bears lost 20–17.

=== 2026 season ===
Kmet scored a 22-yard touchdown reception in the first game of 2026 against the Panthers. Otherwise, he mainly served as a run blocker; he was involved in 130 run-blocking snaps through the first five games, second most among tight ends behind Loveland.

In the fourth quarter of the Bears' Week 7 win over the New England Patriots, Kmet hurt his right knee while absorbing a tackle from Christian Gonzalez and Robert Spillane. He was placed on injured reserve a day later on October 23.

== Career statistics ==
=== NFL ===
Legend
**Bold**	Career high

==== Regular season ====
Career NFL regular season statistics
Year	Team	Games		Receiving					Rushing				
Year	Team	GP	GS	Rec	Yds	Avg	Lng	TD	Att	Yds	Avg	Lng	TD
2020	CHI	16	9	28	243	8.7	38	2	1	-3	-3.0	-3	0
2021	CHI	**17**	**17**	60	612	10.2	25	0	1	0	0.0	0	0
2022	CHI	**17**	**17**	50	544	10.9	50	**7**	2	**9**	**4.5**	**8**	0
2023	CHI	**17**	**17**	**73**	**719**	9.8	**53**	6	**3**	2	0.7	1	0
2024	CHI	**17**	16	47	474	10.1	31	4	-	-	-	-	-
2025	CHI	16	15	30	347	**11.6**	31	2	-	-	-	-	-
Career		100	91	288	2,939	10.2	53	21	7	8	1.1	8	0

==== Postseason ====
Career NFL postseason statistics
Year	Team	Games		Receiving					Rushing				
Year	Team	GP	GS	Rec	Yds	Avg	Lng	TD	Att	Yds	Avg	Lng	TD
2020	CHI	1	1	**3**	16	5.3	9	0	0	0	0.0	0	0
2025	CHI	2	2	**3**	**31**	**10.3**	**14**	**1**	**1**	**1**	**1.0**	**1**	0
Career		3	3	6	47	7.8	14	1	1	1	1.0	1	0

=== College ===
Career college football statistics
Year	Team	Games		Receiving				
Year	Team	GP	GS	Rec	Yds	Avg	Lng	TD
2017	Notre Dame	13	0	2	14	7.0	11	0
2018	Notre Dame	11	7	15	162	10.8	24	0
2019	Notre Dame	11	11	43	515	12.0	37	6
Career		35	18	60	691	11.5	37	6

== Personal life ==
Kmet's father Frank Kmet was selected in the 1992 NFL draft but never played in an NFL game. His uncle Jeff Zgonina played in the NFL. Kmet is of Polish descent through his mother.

Kmet grew up a Bears and Chicago Cubs fan.
