= Rick Dennison =

American football player and coach (born 1958)

Las Vegas Raiders
- Title: Offensive line coach

Personal information
- Born: June 22, 1958 (age 68); Kalispell, Montana, U.S.
- Listed height: 6 ft 3 in (1.91 m)
- Listed weight: 215 lb (98 kg)

Career information
- Position: Linebacker (No. 55)
- High school: Rocky Mountain (Fort Collins, Colorado)
- College: Colorado State
- NFL draft: 1980: undrafted

Career history

Playing
- Buffalo Bills (1980)*; Denver Broncos (1981)*; Buffalo Bills (1982)*; Denver Broncos (1982–1990)
- * Offseason or practice squad member only

Coaching
- Denver Broncos (1995–2009); Offensive assistant (1995–1996); Special teams coordinator (1997–2000); Offensive line coach (2001–2005); Offensive coordinator (2006–2008); Offensive line coach (2009); Houston Texans (2010–2013) Offensive coordinator; Baltimore Ravens (2014) Quarterbacks coach; Denver Broncos (2015–2016) Offensive coordinator; Buffalo Bills (2017) Offensive coordinator; New York Jets (2018) Offensive line coach & run game coordinator; Minnesota Vikings (2019–2021); Offensive line coach & run game coordinator (2019–2020); Senior offensive advisor (2021); Academy Force (MN) (2022–2023) Assistant coach; New Orleans Saints (2024) Senior offensive assistant; Seattle Seahawks (2025) Run game coordinator & senior offensive advisor; Las Vegas Raiders (2026–present) Offensive line coach

Awards and highlights
- As coach: 4× Super Bowl champion (XXXII, XXXIII, 50, LX)

Career NFL statistics
- Games played: 128
- Sacks: 6.5
- Interceptions: 4
- Stats at Pro Football Reference
- Coaching profile at Pro Football Reference

Rick Steven Dennison (born June 22, 1958) is an American professional football coach and former linebacker who is currently the offensive line coach for the Las Vegas Raiders of the National Football League (NFL). He was the offensive line coach and run game coordinator for the Minnesota Vikings of the National Football League (NFL) from 2019 to 2020. An assistant in the NFL since 1995, he has worked exclusively on the staffs of Mike Shanahan and Gary Kubiak, and also served as offensive coordinator for the Denver Broncos (2006–2008, 2015–2016), Houston Texans (2010–2013), and Buffalo Bills (2017), and served as quarterbacks coach for the Baltimore Ravens in 2014. He was the special teams coach for the Super Bowl champion Broncos in 1997 and 1998. He spent his entire NFL playing career in Denver from 1982 to 1990, he appeared in Super Bowls XXI, XXII, and XXIV.

== Early life ==
Dennison was born in Kalispell, Montana, on June 22, 1958. His father George was the 16th President of The University of Montana from 1990 to 2010. The younger Dennison starred in football, baseball, and basketball at Rocky Mountain High School where he graduated in 1976.

== Playing career ==
=== College ===
Dennison attended Colorado State University where he was a football letterman for the Rams in 1976, 1978 and 1979. Wearing uniform number 83 and primarily a tight end for head coach Sark Arslanian, Dennison also saw some action as a wide receiver. He was both a second-team Academic All-American and the recipient of the Merrill-Gheen Award as the university's most outstanding male scholar-athlete in his senior year. He earned a bachelor's and master's degree, both in civil engineering, in 1980 and 1982 respectively.

=== National Football League ===
Dennison moved to linebacker when he entered the NFL. He played for the Denver Broncos from 1982 to 1990.

== Coaching career ==
=== Early career ===
During a year off in 1993 for personal reasons, "Rico" assisted Suffield Academy in a successful New England football championship.

=== Denver Broncos (first stint) ===
Dennison began his coaching career as an offensive assistant for the Denver Broncos in 1995 and would serve in this role until 1996. In 1997, Dennison was promoted to special teams coordinator and would serve in this role for four seasons. In 2001, Dennison shifted to the offensive line coach of the Broncos. In 2006, Dennison was promoted to offensive coordinator of the Broncos and would serve in this role from 2006 to 2008.

=== Houston Texans ===
In 2010, Dennison was hired by the Houston Texans as their offensive coordinator and served in this position from 2010 to 2013. Dennison's move to Houston reunited him with Texans head coach Gary Kubiak, who was a teammate of his in Denver between 1983 and 1990 and a fellow Broncos assistant coach between 1995 and 2005, and who he succeeded as Broncos offensive coordinator in 2006. On January 6, 2013, the Chicago Bears announced that they would interview Dennison for their head coaching position.

=== Baltimore Ravens ===
Both Dennison and Kubiak were appointed quarterbacks coach and offensive coordinator respectively of the Baltimore Ravens on January 27, 2014.

=== Denver Broncos (second stint) ===
In January 2015, Dennison returned to the position of offensive coordinator with the Broncos following the hiring of Kubiak as head coach. On February 7, 2016, Dennison was part of the Broncos coaching staff that won Super Bowl 50. In the game, the Broncos defeated the Carolina Panthers by a score of 24–10.

After the retirement of Kubiak following the 2016 season, Dennison was replaced by former San Diego Chargers head coach Mike McCoy as the Broncos' offensive coordinator.

=== Buffalo Bills ===
On January 19, 2017, he was hired by the Buffalo Bills to serve on Sean McDermott's staff as offensive coordinator. On January 12, 2018, Dennison was relieved of duty as offensive coordinator after one season that saw the Bills offense finish 29th overall despite making the postseason.

=== New York Jets ===
On January 27, 2018, Dennison was hired by the New York Jets as their offensive line coach and run game coordinator under head coach Todd Bowles.

=== Minnesota Vikings ===
On February 8, 2019, Dennison was hired by the Minnesota Vikings as their offensive line coach and run game coordinator under head coach Mike Zimmer, replacing Clancy Barone and Andrew Janocko, who took over in place of Tony Sparano, who died prior to the 2018 season. In 2021, during the COVID-19 pandemic, Dennison refused to take a vaccine and was promoted to a different job. Rick served as the Minnesota Vikings senior offensive advisor. The reason for this promotion was due to COVID-19 protocols, as the position allowed him to avoid contact with players.

=== New Orleans Saints ===
On February 16, 2024, Dennison was hired to serve as the senior offensive assistant for the New Orleans Saints.

=== Seattle Seahawks ===
On February 18, 2025, the Seattle Seahawks hired Dennison to serve as the team's running back-game coordinator. He was part of the coaching staff that won Super Bowl LX over the New England Patriots 29–13.

=== Las Vegas Raiders ===
On February 16, 2026, Dennison followed Klint Kubiak to the Las Vegas Raiders as the team's offensive line coach. Dennison has spent most of his playing and coaching career with the Kubiak family.
