= Jaquan Brisker =

American football player (born 1999)

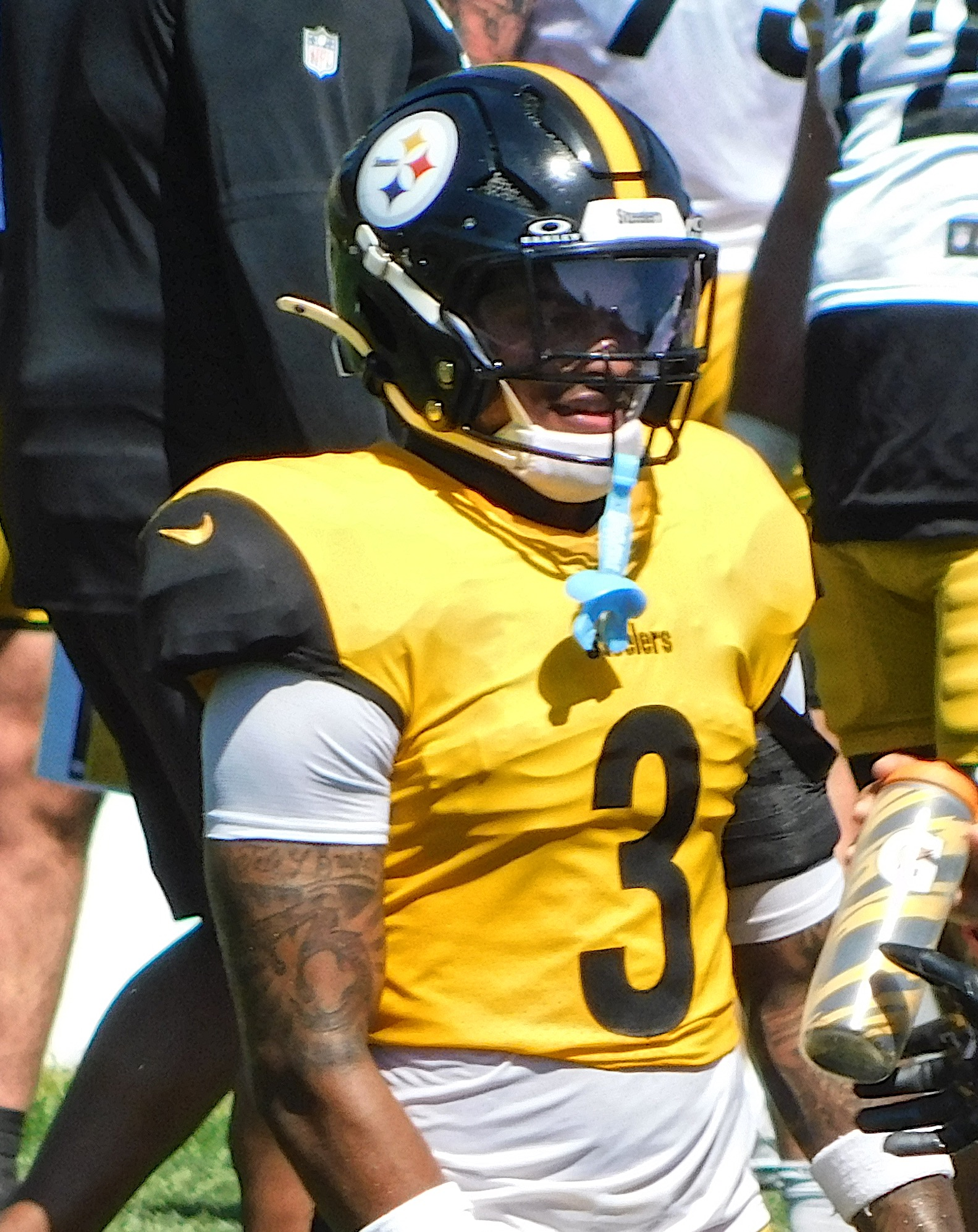
- Brisker with Pittsburgh Steelers in 2026

No. 3 – Pittsburgh Steelers
- Position: Safety
- Roster status: Active

Personal information
- Born: April 20, 1999 (age 27); Pittsburgh, Pennsylvania, U.S.
- Listed height: 6 ft 1 in (1.85 m)
- Listed weight: 204 lb (93 kg)

Career information
- High school: Gateway (Monroeville, Pennsylvania)
- College: Lackawanna (2017–2018); Penn State (2019–2021)
- NFL draft: 2022: 2nd round, 48th overall pick

Career history
- Chicago Bears (2022–2025); Pittsburgh Steelers (2026–present)

Awards and highlights
- Second-team All-American (2021); First-team All-Big Ten (2021); Third-team All-Big Ten (2020); NJCAA First-team All-American (2018)

Career NFL statistics as of Week 10, 2026
- Total tackles: 403
- Sacks: 7.0
- Forced fumbles: 4
- Fumble recoveries: 2
- Pass deflections: 24
- Interceptions: 5
- Stats at Pro Football Reference

Jaquan Monte Brisker (born April 20, 1999) is an American professional football safety for the Pittsburgh Steelers of the National Football League (NFL). He played college football for the Lackawanna Falcons and Penn State Nittany Lions prior to being selected by the Chicago Bears 48th overall in the 2022 NFL draft.

== Early life ==
Brisker grew up in Pittsburgh, Pennsylvania and attended Gateway High School in Monroeville, Pennsylvania, where he played basketball and football.

Brisker was initially recruited by several major college football programs until it became apparent that he would be academically ineligible to play NCAA Division I football due to a low SAT score. He instead enrolled at Lackawanna College in Scranton, Pennsylvania over offers from Youngstown State, Toledo, and California University of Pennsylvania.

== College career ==
=== Lackawanna College ===
Brisker began his collegiate career at Lackawanna College. After his freshman season, Brisker committed to transfer to Penn State over offers from Alabama, Ole Miss, Maryland, Mississippi State, Pittsburgh, Utah, and West Virginia. As a sophomore, he had 64 tackles, 17 tackles for loss, and nine sacks with five passes broken up, one forced fumble and one fumble recovery.

=== Penn State ===
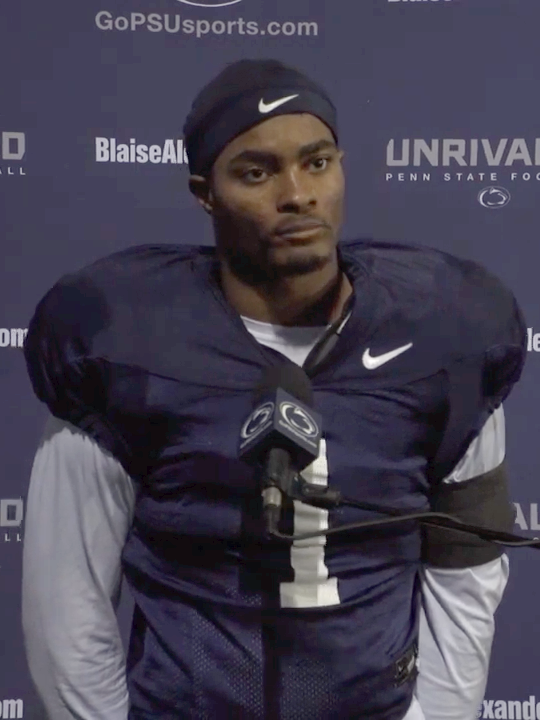
Brisker with Penn State in 2021

In his first season at Pennsylvania State University in 2019, Brisker played in 13 games and finished the year with 32 tackles, two interceptions, and three pass breakups.

He was named a starter going into his senior season in 2020 and was named third-team All-Big Ten after recording 57 tackles, four passes broken up, and one interception.

Brisker decided to utilize the extra year of eligibility granted to college athletes who played in the 2020 season due to the coronavirus pandemic and return to Penn State in 2021. During the 2021 season, Brisker was voted as a team captain while tallying 64 total tackles, 5.5 tackles for loss, two interceptions, five passes broken up, and a fumble recovery. On December 28, 2021, Brisker announced he would be skipping the 2022 Outback Bowl and declared for the 2022 NFL draft. He was voted as a second-team All-American, first-team All-Big Ten, and accepted an invite to the Senior Bowl (later electing to opt-out).

== Professional career ==
=== Pre-draft ===
NFL draft analysts and scouts projected that Brisker would be selected in the second round or possibly in the third round. Cory Giddings of Bleacher Report ranked him as the second best safety prospect (31st overall) in the draft. Kevin Hanson of Sports Illustrated ranked Brisker as the third best safety prospect available in the draft. NFL media analyst Daniel Jeremiah had him ranked fifth among safety prospects (53rd overall) in the draft. Zach Patraw of Sports Illustrated had him ranked seventh among all safeties in the draft.

External videos
- Jaquan Brisker's College Highlights
- Jaquan Brisker: NFL Scouting Combine

Pre-draft measurables
Height	Weight	Arm length	Hand span	Wingspan	40-yard dash	10-yard split	20-yard split	20-yard shuttle	Three-cone drill	Vertical jump	Broad jump	Bench press
6 ft 1 3/8 in (1.86 m)	199 lb (90 kg)	31 3/4 in (0.81 m)	9 7/8 in (0.25 m)	6 ft 4 in (1.93 m)	4.45 s	1.57 s	2.52 s	4.19 s	6.91 s	38.5 in (0.98 m)	10 ft 4 in (3.15 m)	22 reps
All values from NFL Combine/Pro Day

=== Chicago Bears ===
==== 2022 ====
The Chicago Bears selected Brisker in the second round (48th overall) of the 2022 NFL draft. He was the fifth safety drafted. The Chicago Bears had previously acquired this pick as part of a trade for Khalil Mack with the Los Angeles Chargers and in return received the 2022 second-round pick (48th overall) and a 2023 sixth-round pick (200th overall). He was the first of two safeties the Bears drafted in 2022, along with seventh round pick (254th overall) Elijah Hicks.

External videos
- Bears select Jaquan Brisker No. 48
- Poles and Eberflus call Jaquan Brisker

"You're talking about a big guy that's physical. We like his toughness. We like his ball skills … [He's] got speed, range, ball skills, plus he brings the physical side of the game that we like. With 'Flus' and his defense wanting to be a physical team, [Brisker] also brings that aspect of it, too."

— Chris Prescott (Bears' Area Scout)

On July 26, 2022, the Chicago Bears signed Brisker to a four–year, $7.35 million rookie contract that includes $3.56 million guaranteed and an initial signing bonus of $2.52 million.

He entered training camp projected to be the starting strong safety and had minor competition for the role from DeAndre Houston-Carson following the departure of Tashaun Gipson. Head coach Matt Eberflus named Brisker the starting strong safety to begin the season and paired him with free safety Eddie Jackson.

On September 11, 2022, Brisker made his professional regular season debut and earned his first career start in the Chicago Bears' home-opener against the San Francisco 49ers and made four solo tackles and had the first fumble recovery of his career after Jaylon Johnson forced a fumble by wide receiver Deebo Samuel during a 19–10 victory. In Week 4, he made five combined tackles (four solo) and made his first career sack on Daniel Jones for an 11–yard loss as the Bears lost 12–20 at the New York Giants. On October 24, 2022, Brisker made seven combined tackles (five solo), one pass deflection, and had his first career interception on a pass attempt thrown by Mac Jones to tight end Jonnu Smith during a 33–14 victory at the New England Patriots. On November 20, 2022, Brisker possibly suffered a concussion on the opening drive of a Week 11 matchup at the Atlanta Falcons, as he went on to tackle quarterback Marcus Mariota on a scramble, Brisker accidentally drove his head into tight end MyCole Pruitt's back during the sequence and showed difficulty getting up and required assistance to get off the field. The Bears neglected to go through concussion protocol and Brisker returned to play defense after missing only one snap. In the third quarter, Brisker assisted a tackle on during a run by running back Cordarrelle Patterson and subsequently hit his head on the turf and grabbed his head in a sign of discomfort. He returned to the next series and finished the game with a season-high 11 combined tackles (seven solo) as the Bears lost to the Falcons 24–27. The following day, the Bears reported that Brisker had been officially diagnosed with a concussion and would remain in concussion protocol for the next two games (Weeks 12–13). He finished his rookie season with a total of 104 combined tackles (73 solo), led the team with four sacks, made two pass deflections, one interception, a forced fumble, and a fumble recovery in 15 games and 15 starts. Pro Football Focus named Brisker to the 2022 All-Rookie Team. He was also voted as the Bears' Rookie of the Year by CBS Sports Chicago. He received an overall grade of 67.0 from Pro Football Focus as a rookie in 2022.

==== 2023 ====
He returned to training camp slated as the de facto starting strong safety under defensive coordinator Alan Williams. Head coach Matt Eberflus named him and Eddie Jackson the starting safeties to begin the season. On September 20, 2023, the Bears' defensive coordinator Alan Williams announced his immediate resignation. On October 22, 2023, Brisker recorded ten combined tackles (nine solo) and one pass deflection during a 30–12 win against the Las Vegas Raiders, but suffered a concussion during a two-point attempt by the Raiders with 1:10 remaining in the game. He would remain inactive in concussion protocol for the next two games (Weeks 8–9). In Week 12, Brisker had three combined tackles (two solo), was credited with half a sack, made one pass deflection, and had his only interception of the season on a pass by Joshua Dobbs to wide receiver Jordan Addison during a 12–10 win at the Minnesota Vikings. On December 10, 2023, Brisker set a career-high with 17 combined tackles (13 solo), deflected two passes, and had a forced fumble during a 28–13 victory against the Detroit Lions. He finished the 2023 NFL season with a total of 105 combined tackles (66 solo), nine pass deflections, two forced fumbles, one fumble recovery, one sack, and an interception in 15 games and 15 starts. He received an overall grade of 66.7 from Pro Football Focus in 2023.

==== 2024 ====
The Bears hired Eric Williams as their new defensive coordinator. Washington retained Brisker as the starting strong safety to begin the season and paired him with Kevin Byard following the departure of Eddie Jackson.

On September 29, 2024, Brisker set a season-high with 12 combined tackles (nine solo), made one pass deflection, a sack, and had his lone interception of the season on a pass by Matthew Stafford to tight end Colby Parkinson during a 24–18 win against the Los Angeles Rams. In Week 5, Brisker had five combined tackles (two solo), a pass deflection, and forced a fumble before exiting late in the second quarter after sustaining a concussion on a violent collision where he dove for a tackle on tight end Tommy Tremble with the crown of his helmet down, hitting Tremble hard enough to force a fumble and also knocking Tremble out during the Bears' 36–10 win against the Carolina Panthers. He was placed into concussion protocol and remained inactive for the remainder of the season, missing the last 12 games (Weeks 6–18). He finished the season with 40 combined tackles (23 solo), two pass deflections, one sack, and one interception in five games and five starts. He received an overall grade of 65.3 from Pro Football Focus, which ranked 72nd among 171 qualifying safeties in 2024.

==== 2025 ====
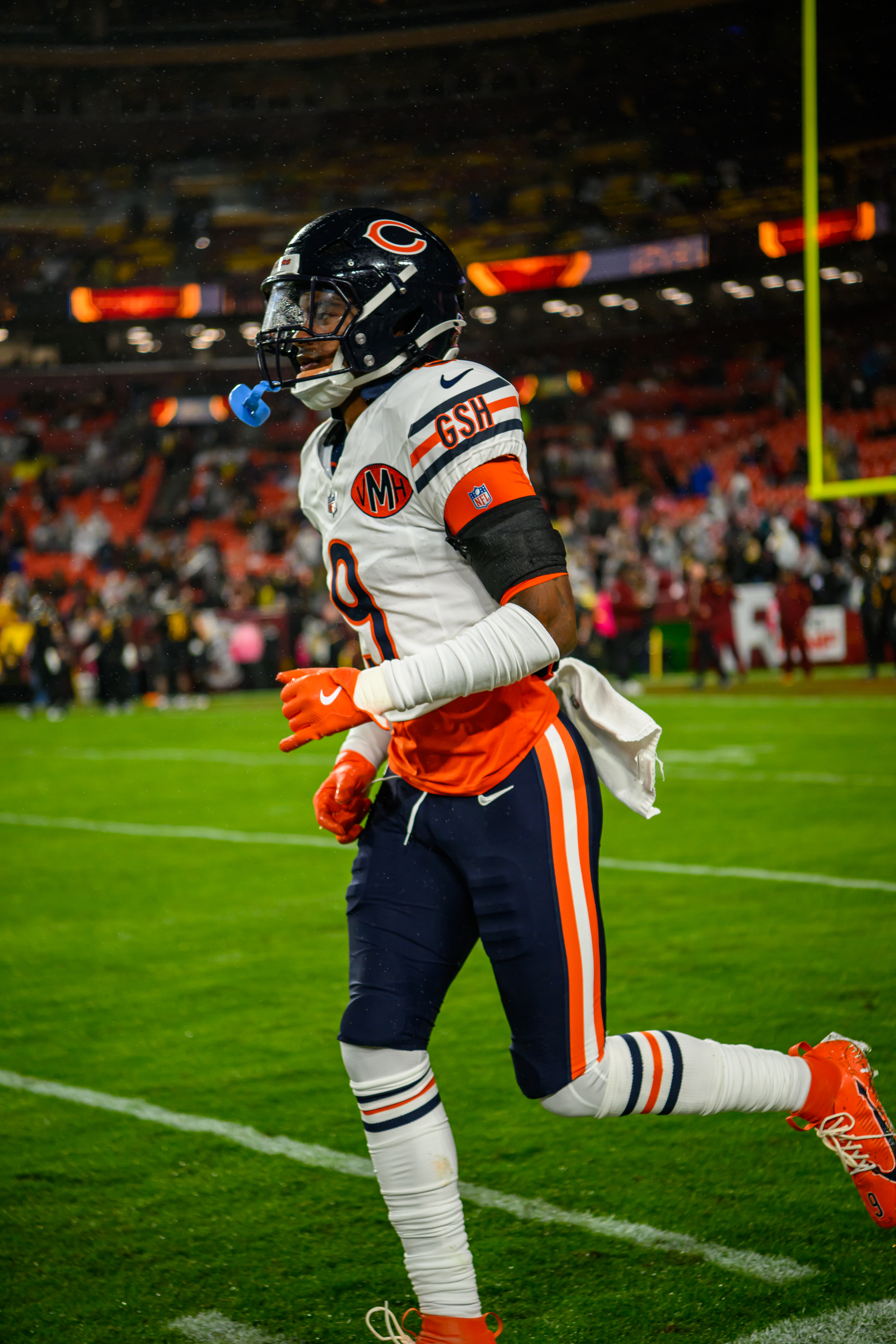
Brisker in 2025

For 2025, Dennis Allen was brought in as the Bears' defensive coordinator under new head coach Ben Johnson; Brisker praised the hire, expressing interest in becoming a "Swiss Army knife" type of player under Allen. He began the season by primarily playing free safety due to injuries at cornerback.

Brisker recorded his first interception of the year in Week 6 against the Washington Commanders, jumping a would-be touchdown pass from Jayden Daniels to Deebo Samuel.

=== Pittsburgh Steelers ===
On March 16, 2026, Brisker signed with the Pittsburgh Steelers on a one-year, $5.5 million contract.

In his first game with the team against the Atlanta Falcons, Brisker recorded an interception thrown by Cooper Rush.

== Career statistics ==
=== NFL ===
Legend
**Bold**	Career high

==== Regular season ====
Year	Team	Games		Tackles					Interceptions						Fumbles			
Year	Team	GP	GS	Cmb	Solo	Ast	Sck	TFL	PD	Int	Yds	Avg	Lng	TD	FF	FR	Yds	TD
2022	CHI	15	15	104	**73**	31	**4.0**	**5**	2	**1**	6	6.0	6	0	1	**1**	0	0
2023	CHI	15	15	**105**	66	39	1.0	3	**9**	**1**	0	0.0	0	0	**2**	**1**	0	0
2024	CHI	5	5	40	23	17	1.0	3	2	**1**	0	0.0	0	0	1	0	0	0
2025	CHI	17	17	93	52	**41**	1.0	1	8	**1**	**32**	**32.0**	**32**	0	0	0	0	0
2026	PIT	9	9	61	27	34	0.0	0	3	**1**	10	10.0	10	0	0	0	0	0
Career		61	61	403	241	162	7.0	12	24	5	48	9.6	32	0	4	2	0	0

==== Postseason ====
Year	Team	Games		Tackles					Interceptions						Fumbles			
Year	Team	GP	GS	Cmb	Solo	Ast	Sck	TFL	PD	Int	Yds	Avg	Lng	TD	FF	FR	Yds	TD
2025	CHI	2	2	23	13	10	1.0	1	2	0	0	0.0	0	0	0	0	0	0
Career		2	2	23	13	10	1.0	1	2	0	0	0.0	0	0	0	0	0	0

=== College ===
Year	Team	GP	Tackles					Interceptions					Fumbles		
Year	Team	GP	Solo	Ast	Cmb	TFL	Sck	Int	Yds	Avg	TD	PD	FR	FF	TD
2017	Lackawanna College	9	30	24	54	4.5	0.0	**4**	**179**	**44.8**	**2**	4	**1**	1	0
2018	Lackawanna College	10	**54**	11	**65**	**17.0**	**9.0**	0	0	0.0	0	5	**1**	**2**	**1**
2019	Penn State	**13**	15	17	32	1.0	0.0	2	33	16.5	0	5	0	0	0
2020	Penn State	9	33	24	57	3.0	0.0	1	18	18.0	0	**7**	0	0	0
2021	Penn State	12	38	**26**	64	6.0	0.0	2	39	19.5	0	**7**	0	1	0
Career		53	170	102	272	31.5	9.0	9	269	29.9	2	28	2	4	1
