= Justin Hinds (American football) =

American football coach

Seattle Seahawks
- Title: Defensive line coach

Career information
- Position: Defensive lineman
- High school: Woodbridge (Woodbridge Township)
- College: Rowan (2005–2008)

Career history
- Rowan (2009) Assistant Defensive Line coach; Wagner (2012–2013) Defensive Line and Outside Linebackers coach; Mississippi State (2014) Defensive Graduate Assistant; Florida (2015) Defensive Graduate Assistant; Valdosta State (2016–2017) Defensive Line coach and Academic Coordinator; Lafayette (2018) Defensive Line coach; Central Michigan (2019–2020) Defensive Line coach; Western Carolina (2021) Defensive Coordinator; Chicago Bears (2022–2023) Assistant Defensive Line Coach; Seattle Seahawks (2024–present) Defensive Line Coach

Awards and highlights
- Super Bowl champion (LX)

Justin Hinds is an American professional football coach for the Seattle Seahawks of the National Football League (NFL). He previously coached at the collegiate level at Lafayette, Central Michigan, and Western Carolina. He played college football as a defensive lineman for the Rowan Profs.

== Life and career ==
Hinds is a native of Port Reading, New Jersey. He attended Woodbridge High School in New Jersey and graduated there in 2005. Hinds began his football career playing for Woodbridge Barrons. In his senior year, he recorded 41 total tackles, one sack, and one fumble recovery. He earned third-team All-Area honors as a result. He then attended Rowan University, where he joined the Profs as a defensive lineman and played all four years of eligibility for them. During his junior and senior seasons, he received All-NJAC First Team honors. Through his four years at defensive, he had 115 tackles and 9.0 sacks for Rowan.

After his career for Rowan, Hinds's coaching career began with the Profs' staff as an assistant defensive line coach in 2009. Hinds moved on to coaching for the Wagner Seahawks, serving as their defensive line coach and linebackers coach in 2012. Hinds then went on to coach for Mississippi State and the University of Florida as a defensive graduate assistant in 2014 and 2015, respectively. He then went on to work for two years at Valdosta State serving as the team's defensive line coach and academic coordinator. His next role was as coach at Lafayette for a year, then coaching for two years for Central Michigan, both as the defensive line coach. In 2021, Hinds upgraded his role to being defensive coordinator for Western Carolina.

For the 2022 season, the Chicago Bears hired Hinds as an assistant defensive line coach, where he spent the next two seasons. Without this opportunity, Hinds originally expected to become an accountant before discovering coaching. On February 22, 2024, Hinds was hired by the Seattle Seahawks as the main defensive line coach. He was involved with The Dark Side defense and the Seahawks' win of Super Bowl LX.
