= George M. Dennison =

American academic administrator

George Marshel Dennison (August 11, 1935 – January 3, 2017) was a University President of the University of Montana. He served as such from 1990 to his retirement in 2010. Dennison died from Non-Hodgkin lymphoma on January 3, 2017, at the age of 81. He is also the father of NFL coach Rick Dennison.
