= Dante Pettis =

American football player (born 1995)

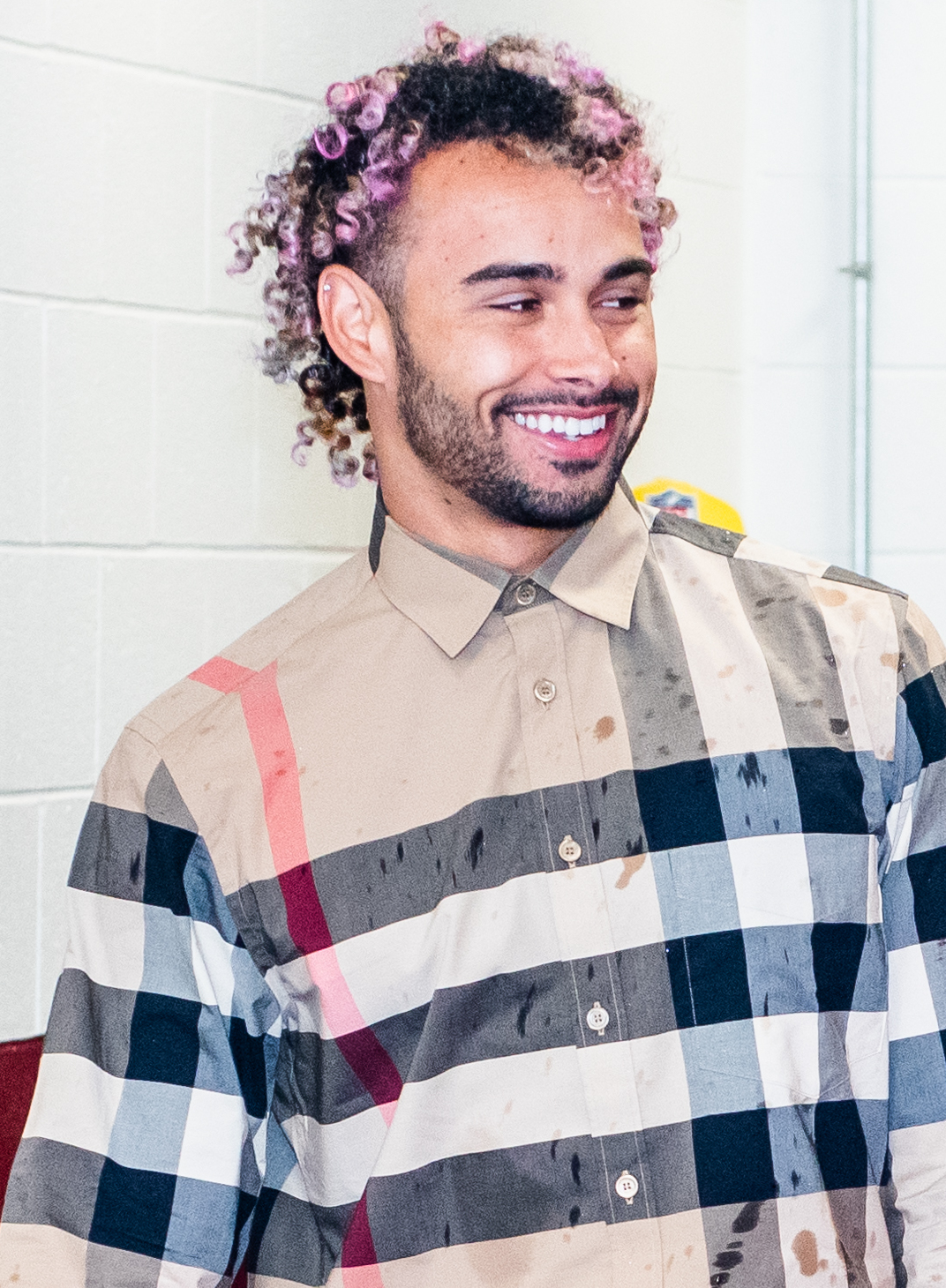
- Pettis in 2019

Profile
- Position: Wide receiver

Personal information
- Born: October 23, 1995 (age 31); San Clemente, California, U.S.
- Listed height: 6 ft 1 in (1.85 m)
- Listed weight: 200 lb (91 kg)

Career information
- High school: JSerra Catholic(San Juan Capistrano, California)
- College: Washington (2014–2017)
- NFL draft: 2018: 2nd round, 44th overall pick

Career history
- San Francisco 49ers (2018–2020); New York Giants (2020–2021); Chicago Bears (2022–2023); New Orleans Saints (2024–2025); Buffalo Bills (2026)*; San Francisco 49ers (2026)*
- * Offseason or practice squad member only

Awards and highlights
- Jet Award (2017); Consensus All-American (2017); NCAA punt return yards leader (2017); NCAA average punt return yards leader (2017); First-team All-Pac-12 (2017); NCAA (FBS) record: Career punt return touchdowns: 9

Career NFL statistics as of 2025
- Receptions: 92
- Receiving yards: 1,231
- Receiving touchdowns: 13
- Stats at Pro Football Reference

Dante Garrison Pettis (born October 23, 1995) is an American professional football wide receiver. He played college football for the Washington Huskies and was drafted by the 49ers in the second round of the 2018 NFL draft. Pettis has also been a member of the New York Giants, Chicago Bears, New Orleans Saints, and Buffalo Bills.

== Early life ==
Pettis attended JSerra Catholic High School in San Juan Capistrano, California. He played football and basketball and also ran track. As a senior, Pettis recorded 50 receptions for 889 yards and 11 touchdowns. He committed to the University of Washington to play college football.

== College career ==
As a true freshman for Washington in 2014, Pettis had 17 receptions for 259 yards and a touchdown. He also added 288 punt return yards and a punt return touchdown.

As a sophomore, Pettis recorded 30 receptions for 414 yards and a touchdown reception with 271 punt return yards and two punt return touchdowns.

As a junior, Pettis finished with 53 receptions for 822 yards and 15 touchdowns to go along with 287 punt return yards and two touchdowns.

As a senior in 2017 against the Oregon Ducks, Pettis broke the record for most career punt return touchdowns in NCAA history. He garnered consensus All-America honors as a result of being named a first-team All-American by the American Football Coaches Association, Football Writers Association of America, Walter Camp Football Foundation, and The Sporting News. Pettis finished the season with 63 receptions for 761 yards and seven touchdowns to go along with an NCAA-leading 428 punt return yards and four touchdowns.

== Professional career ==
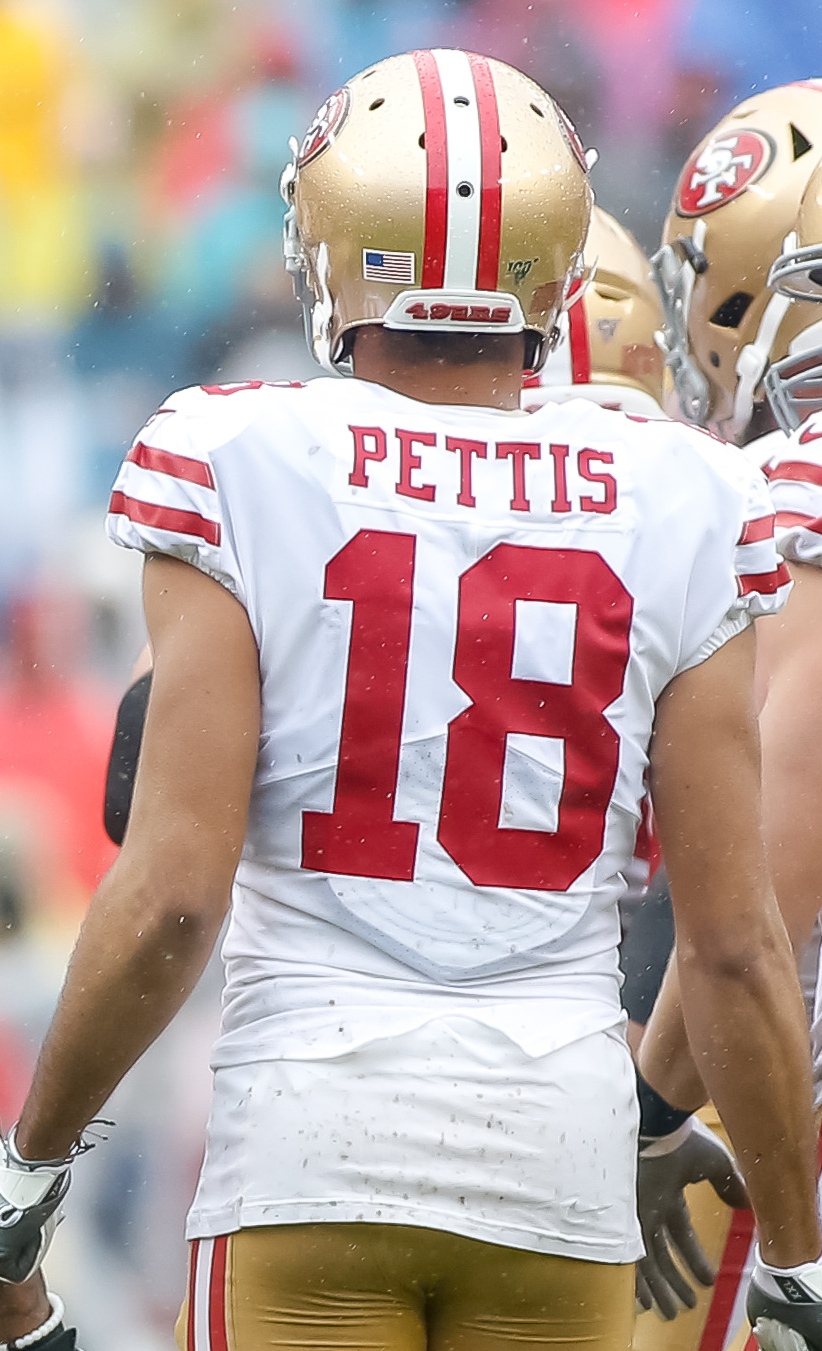
Pettis in 2019

Pre-draft measurables
Height	Weight	Arm length	Hand span	Wingspan	Wonderlic
6 ft 0 1/2 in (1.84 m)	186 lb (84 kg)	32 1/4 in (0.82 m)	9 1/2 in (0.24 m)	6 ft 5 1/4 in (1.96 m)	32
All values from NFL Combine

=== San Francisco 49ers (first stint) ===
The San Francisco 49ers selected Pettis in the second round (44th overall) of the 2018 NFL draft. He was the fourth wide receiver to be selected that year. During the season-opener against the Minnesota Vikings, Pettis made his NFL debut and caught two passes for 61 yards and a touchdown while also returning two punts for 14 yards in the 24–16 loss. On December 29, 2018, Pettis was placed on injured reserve after suffering a knee injury. Pettis finished his rookie year with 27 receptions for 467 yards and five touchdowns.

In Pettis' second season, he had 11 receptions for 109 yards and two touchdowns.

On November 3, 2020, Pettis was waived by the 49ers.

=== New York Giants ===
On November 4, 2020, Pettis was claimed off waivers by the New York Giants. He was placed on the reserve/COVID-19 list by the team on November 20, and activated on December 1. In his first game played as a Giant, on December 27, against the Baltimore Ravens, Pettis finished with two receptions for 33 yards. He caught his first touchdown as a Giant the next week, against the Dallas Cowboys, for 33 yards. Pettis finished the 2020 season with four receptions for 76 yards and a touchdown.

On September 1, 2021, Pettis was waived by the Giants and re-signed to the practice squad. On October 19, Pettis was signed to active roster. In Week 7 against the Carolina Panthers, Pettis had five receptions for 39 yards and a touchdown while adding a 16-yard pass to Daniel Jones. On November 5, 2021, Pettis was placed on injured reserve with a shoulder injury.

=== Chicago Bears ===
On May 11, 2022, the Chicago Bears signed Pettis. During Week 6, Pettis caught four passes for 84 yards and the Bears' only touchdown, during a 12–7 loss to the Washington Commanders.

Pettis re-signed with the Bears on April 17, 2023. He was placed on injured reserve on August 26. Pettis was released on September 6, with an injury settlement.

On March 15, 2024, Pettis re-signed with the Bears. He was placed on injured reserve on August 27, and was released a week later.

=== New Orleans Saints ===
On October 15, 2024, Pettis signed with the New Orleans Saints practice squad. On December 7, he was promoted to the active roster. In eight games for New Orleans, Pettis operated as the team's return man, and compiled 12 receptions for 120 yards and a touchdown.

On March 11, 2025, Pettis re-signed with New Orleans on a one-year contract. He was released on August 26 as part of final roster cuts. On October 2, Pettis was re-signed to the practice squad. On December 3, Pettis was signed to the active roster. In the 2025 season, he had nine receptions for 127 yards in eight games.

=== Buffalo Bills ===
On July 30, 2026, Pettis had a workout with the Buffalo Bills on the second day of training camp, and was signed later that day. He was released by the Bills on August 29.

=== San Francisco 49ers (second stint) ===
On September 30, 2026, Pettis signed with the San Francisco 49ers practice squad. On October 7, 2026, Pettis was placed on the practice squad injured reserve. On October 8, Pettis was released with an injury settlement.

== NFL career statistics ==
Year	Team	Games		Receiving					Rushing					Returning					Fumbles	
Year	Team	GP	GS	Rec	Yds	Avg	Lng	TD	Att	Yds	Avg	Lng	TD	Ret	Yds	Avg	Lng	TD	Fum	Lost
2018	SF	12	7	27	467	17.3	75T	5	1	-2	-2.0	-2	0	9	27	3.0	14	0	2	0
2019	SF	11	4	11	109	9.9	21T	2	0	0	0.0	0	0	0	0	0.0	0	0	0	0
2020	SF	5	1	0	0	0	0	0	0	0	0	0	0	0	0	0	0	0	0	0
2020	NYG	2	2	4	76	19.0	33T	1	0	0	0	0	0	0	0	0	0	0	1	1
2021	NYG	3	0	10	87	8.7	27	1	0	0	0	0	0	0	0	0	0	0	1	0
2022	CHI	17	7	19	245	12.9	51	3	2	37	18.5	29	0	0	0	0	0	0	1	0
2024	NO	8	0	12	120	10.0	20	1	0	0	0	0	0	0	0	0	0	0	0	0
2025	NO	8	0	9	127	14.1	32	0	0	0	0	0	0	0	0	0	0	0	1	1
Career		66	21	92	1,231	14.1	75T	13	3	35	11.7	29	0	9	27	3.0	14	0	6	2

== Personal life ==
Pettis' father, Gary, played in Major League Baseball (MLB) and was a coach for the Houston Astros. His brother, Kyler, is an actor, and his cousin, Austin, played in the NFL.
