= Elijah Hicks =

American football player (born 1999)

No. 22 – Chicago Bears
- Position: Safety
- Roster status: Active

Personal information
- Born: October 16, 1999 (age 27); Long Beach, California, U.S.
- Listed height: 5 ft 11 in (1.80 m)
- Listed weight: 204 lb (93 kg)

Career information
- High school: La Mirada (La Mirada, California)
- College: California (2017–2021)
- NFL draft: 2022: 7th round, 254th overall pick

Career history
- Chicago Bears (2022–present)

Awards and highlights
- First-team All-Pac-12 (2021)

Career NFL statistics as of Week 7, 2026
- Total tackles: 133
- Forced fumbles: 1
- Fumble recoveries: 3
- Pass deflections: 3
- Stats at Pro Football Reference

Elijah Hicks (born October 16, 1999) is an American professional football safety for the Chicago Bears of the National Football League (NFL). He played college football for the California Golden Bears and was selected by the Bears in the seventh round of the 2022 NFL draft.

== Early life ==
Born in Long Beach, California, Hicks grew up in La Mirada and attended La Mirada High School, where he led the Matadores to back-to-back Suburban League titles, a 13-3 record in 2015 which included a CIF Southern Section Southeast Division championship and a CIF State Division III-AA crown as a junior, and then an 11-3 record and a runner-up finish in Division 3 as a senior, a season in which he had a team-high five interceptions. Hicks earned All-CIF honors in each of his final two years playing high school football.

== College career ==
Hicks was ranked as a three–star recruit by 247Sports.com coming out of high school. He committed to California on January 10, 2017, over offers from Michigan, Notre Dame, UCLA, and USC. He earned First-team All-Pac-12 honors for the 2021 season.

== Professional career ==
Pre-draft measurables
Height	Weight	Arm length	Hand span	Wingspan
5 ft 10 7/8 in (1.80 m)	198 lb (90 kg)	30 1/2 in (0.77 m)	9 3/4 in (0.25 m)	6 ft 3 1/2 in (1.92 m)
All values from Pro Day

Hicks was selected by the Chicago Bears in the seventh round with the 254th overall pick in the 2022 NFL draft. As a rookie, he appeared in 15 games and started two in the 2022 season. He finished with 28 total tackles (15 solo), one forced fumble, and one fumble recovery.

On March 12, 2026, Hicks re-signed with the Bears on a one-year, $2.6 million contract.

== NFL career statistics ==
Legend
**Bold**	Career high

=== Regular season ===
Year	Team	Games		Tackles					Interceptions						Fumbles				
Year	Team	GP	GS	Cmb	Solo	Ast	Sck	TFL	Int	Yds	Avg	Lng	TD	PD	FF	Fum	FR	Yds	TD
2022	CHI	15	2	28	15	13	0.0	0	0	0	0.0	0	0	0	**1**	0	1	0	0
2023	CHI	17	6	35	20	15	0.0	0	0	0	0.0	0	0	1	0	0	0	0	0
2024	CHI	12	7	**40**	**24**	**16**	0.0	0	0	0	0.0	0	0	**2**	0	0	**2**	**28**	0
2025	CHI	17	0	19	9	10	0.0	0	0	0	0.0	0	0	0	0	0	0	0	0
Career		61	15	122	68	54	0.0	0	0	0	0.0	0	0	3	1	0	3	28	0

=== Postseason ===
Year	Team	Games		Tackles					Interceptions						Fumbles				
Year	Team	GP	GS	Cmb	Solo	Ast	Sck	TFL	Int	Yds	Avg	Lng	TD	PD	FF	Fum	FR	Yds	TD
2025	CHI	2	0	2	2	0	0.0	0	0	0	0.0	0	0	0	1	0	0	0	0
Career		2	0	2	2	0	0.0	0	0	0	0.0	0	0	0	1	0	0	0	0
