= Clancy Barone =

American football player and coach (born 1963)

Personal information
- Born: July 26, 1963 (age 63); San Andreas, California, U.S.

Career information
- College: Nevada (1983–1984); Sacramento State (1985–1986)
- NFL draft: 1987: undrafted

Career history

Playing
- Pittsburgh Steelers (1987)

Coaching
- American River (1987–1990) Offensive line coach; Sacramento State (1991–1992) Offensive line coach; Texas A&M (1993) Assistant offensive line coach; Eastern Illinois (1994–1996) Offensive line coach; Wyoming (1997) Offensive line coach; Wyoming (1998–1999) Offensive line coach & run game coordinator; Houston (2000) Offensive line coach; Houston (2001–2002) Offensive coordinator & offensive line coach; Texas State (2003) Assistant head coach & offensive coordinator; Atlanta Falcons (2004) Offensive line coach; Atlanta Falcons (2005–2006) Tight ends coach; San Diego Chargers (2007–2008) Tight ends coach; Denver Broncos (2009) Tight ends coach; Denver Broncos (2010) Offensive line coach; Denver Broncos (2011–2014) Tight ends coach; Denver Broncos (2015–2016) Offensive line coach; Minnesota Vikings (2017) Tight ends coach; Minnesota Vikings (2018) Co-offensive line coach; Chicago Bears (2020–2021) Tight ends coach; New Orleans Saints (2023–2024) Tight ends coach

Awards and highlights
- Super Bowl champion (50)

Clarence Barone (born July 26, 1963) is an American football coach who most recently served as the tight ends coach for the New Orleans Saints of the National Football League (NFL). He previously served as an assistant coach for the Minnesota Vikings, Denver Broncos, San Diego Chargers, Atlanta Falcons and Chicago Bears.

== Coaching career ==
=== Early career ===
Barone began his coaching career at American River College as an offensive line coach. From 1991 to 1992, Barone served as the offensive line coach at Sacramento State University. In 1993, Barone joined Texas A&M University as an assistant offensive line coach before becoming the offensive line coach at Eastern Illinois University (1994–1996) and the University of Wyoming (1997–1999). Barone was given an additional title as run game coordinator at Wyoming in 1998. From 2000 to 2002, Barone was served as the offensive coordinator and offensive line coach at the University of Houston and as the assistant head coach and offensive coordinator at Texas State University in 2003.

=== Atlanta Falcons ===
In 2004, Barone was hired by the Atlanta Falcons as their offensive line coach. In 2005, Barone switched the tight ends coach and worked with all-pro tight end Alge Crumpler.

=== San Diego Chargers ===
In 2007, Barone was hired by the San Diego Chargers as their tight ends coach, where he worked with tight end Antonio Gates.

=== Denver Broncos ===
In 2009, Barone was hired by the Denver Broncos as their tight ends under head coach Josh McDaniels. In 2010, Barone switched to offensive line coach.

In 2011, Barone was retained and switched back to tight ends coach under new head coach of the Broncos, John Fox. Barone coached Broncos tight end Julius Thomas and in 2013, the Broncos had an offensive record-breaking season and made an appearance in Super Bowl XLVIII.

In 2015, Barone was retained by the Broncos new head coach Gary Kubiak and Barone was switched back to offensive line coach. Barone's offensive line paved the way to victory in Super Bowl 50 and the Broncos defeated the Carolina Panthers by a score of 24–10. The 2015 Denver Broncos rushing attack was hampered by multiple injuries in the early part of the season but rebounded to lead the NFL in rushing from week 6 through the end of the season. The 2016 season saw the Broncos again dominate the NFL in rushing for the first part of the season before injuries forced three running backs onto the injured reserved list.

After Broncos head coach Gary Kubiak stepped down in January 2017, Barone was not retained by new head coach, Vance Joseph.

Barone worked with All-Pro players Alge Crumpler (Falcons) and Antonio Gates (Chargers), and Julius Thomas (Broncos) all of whom made multiple Pro Bowl appearances under his guidance. Kyle Rudolph (Vikings) also was selected to the Pro Bowl after the 2017 season. This feat marked the first time in NFL history that a tight ends coach had four players selected to Pro Bowls with four teams. In addition, Barone also coached multiple Pro Bowl caliber players as the Offensive Line coach for the Denver Broncos, including; Ryan Clady, Zane Beadles, Louis Vasquez, Matt Paradis and Evan Mathis. Barone coached teams that led the NFL in rushing four times.

=== Minnesota Vikings ===
In January 2017, Barone was hired by the Minnesota Vikings as their tight ends coach under head coach Mike Zimmer. In 2018, following the sudden death of offensive line coach Tony Sparano, Barone was moved to co-offensive line coach along with Andrew Janocko.

=== Chicago Bears ===
On January 9, 2020, Barone was hired by the Chicago Bears as their tight ends coach under head coach Matt Nagy.

=== New Orleans Saints ===
On February 15, 2023, the New Orleans Saints hired Barone as their tight ends coach.

== Personal life ==
Barone has three children: Gianna, Stefano, and Isabella.
