= Andrew Janocko =

American football player and coach (born 1988)

Las Vegas Raiders
- Title: Offensive coordinator

Personal information
- Born: April 6, 1988 (age 38); Clearfield, Pennsylvania, U.S.
- Listed height: 6 ft 2 in (1.88 m)
- Listed weight: 220 lb (100 kg)

Career information
- Position: Quarterback (No. 4)
- High school: Clearfield Area (PA)
- College: Pittsburgh (2007–2010)

Career history
- Rutgers (2011) Graduate assistant; Tampa Bay Buccaneers (2012–2013) Offensive quality control coach; Mercyhurst (2014) Quarterbacks coach; Minnesota Vikings (2015–2021); Offensive quality control coach (2015–2016); Assistant offensive line coach (2017); Co-offensive line coach (2018); Assistant offensive line coach (2019); Wide receivers coach (2020); Quarterbacks coach (2021); Chicago Bears (2022–2023) Quarterbacks coach; New Orleans Saints (2024) Quarterbacks coach; Seattle Seahawks (2025) Quarterbacks coach; Las Vegas Raiders (2026–present) Offensive coordinator

Awards and highlights
- Super Bowl champion (LX)
- Coaching profile at Pro Football Reference

Andrew James Janocko (born April 6, 1988) is an American professional football coach who is the offensive coordinator for the Las Vegas Raiders of the National Football League (NFL). He previously served as the quarterbacks coach for the Seattle Seahawks in 2025, winning Super Bowl LX.

Janocko played college football at Pittsburgh as a quarterback and he previously served as an assistant coach for the Seattle Seahawks, New Orleans Saints, Chicago Bears, Minnesota Vikings, Mercyhurst University, Tampa Bay Buccaneers and Rutgers University.

== Early life ==
A native of Clearfield, Pennsylvania, Janocko was attended Clearfield Area Junior/Senior High School, where he played as a quarterback under his father, Tim, who served as the head coach for 38 years. He led the school to a pair of district championships and was a two-time Pennsylvania Football News All-State honoree. Janocko played college football at Pittsburgh from 2007 to 2010, primarily as a backup quarterback and special teams holder. Originally a walk-on, he earned a scholarship his junior season.

== Coaching career ==
=== Early career ===
After graduating from Pitt in 2010 with a degree in history, Janocko was hired to be a graduate assistant on Greg Schiano's staff at Rutgers. He joined Schiano when he was named head coach of the Tampa Bay Buccaneers in 2012, as an offensive assistant. He spent the 2014 season as a quarterbacks coach at Mercyhurst in Erie, Pennsylvania.

=== Minnesota Vikings ===
In 2015, Janocko was hired by the Minnesota Vikings as an offensive quality control coach under head coach Mike Zimmer, working in that role before shifting to an assistant offensive line coach under Tony Sparano in 2017.

Janocko was named a co-offensive line coach along Clancy Barone for the 2018 season, after the sudden death of Sparano. He was shifted back to the assistant offensive line coach in 2019 following the hire of Rick Dennison.

On January 27, 2020, Janocko was promoted to wide receivers coach.

On February 9, 2021, Janocko was promoted to quarterbacks coach, replacing Klint Kubiak, who was promoted to offensive coordinator.

=== Chicago Bears ===
On February 3, 2022, Janocko was hired by the Chicago Bears as their new quarterbacks coach. On January 10, 2024, Janocko was fired by the Bears along with offensive coordinator Luke Getsy and wide receivers coach Tyke Tolbert.

=== New Orleans Saints ===
On February 21, 2024, the New Orleans Saints announced that Janocko had been hired as their new quarterbacks coach.

=== Seattle Seahawks ===
On February 3, 2025, Janocko was hired by the Seattle Seahawks as their quarterbacks coach, following offensive coordinator Klint Kubiak. He was part of the coaching staff that won Super Bowl LX over the New England Patriots 29–13.

=== Las Vegas Raiders ===
On February 15, 2026, Janocko was hired by the Las Vegas Raiders as their offensive coordinator under head coach Klint Kubiak.

== Personal life ==
Janocko's father Tim played fullback at Penn State under Joe Paterno and was the head coach at Clearfield Area High School from 1985 until 2022 compiling a record of 307-121-3. As of 2017, Janocko and his wife Natalie lived in Chicago.
