= Tyke Tolbert =

American football player and coach (born 1967)

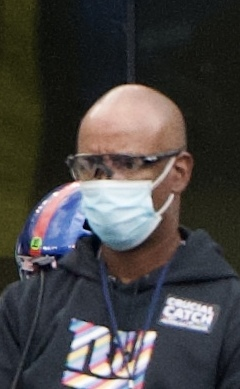
- Tolbert in 2020

Miami Dolphins
- Title: Wide receivers coach

Personal information
- Born: September 15, 1967 (age 59); Conroe, Texas, U.S.

Career information
- Position: Wide receiver
- High school: Conroe (TX)
- College: LSU (1986–1990)

Career history
- LSU (1994) Graduate assistant; Louisiana–Monroe (1994) Graduate assistant; Ohio (1995) Wide receivers coach; Louisiana–Monroe (1995–1997) Tight ends coach; Auburn (1998) Tight ends coach; Louisiana–Lafayette (1999–2001) Wide receivers coach; Florida (2002) Tight ends coach; Arizona Cardinals (2003) Wide receivers coach; Buffalo Bills (2004–2009) Wide receivers coach; Carolina Panthers (2010) Wide receivers coach; Denver Broncos (2011–2017) Wide receivers coach; New York Giants (2018–2021) Wide receivers coach; Chicago Bears (2022–2023) Wide receivers coach & passing game coordinator; Tennessee Titans (2024–2025) Wide receivers coach; Miami Dolphins (2026–present) Wide receivers coach

Awards and highlights
- Super Bowl champion (50)

Tyke Tolbert (born September 15, 1967) is an American football coach and former player who is the wide receivers coach for the Miami Dolphins of the National Football League (NFL). Tolbert previously served as wide receivers coach for the Arizona Cardinals, Buffalo Bills, Carolina Panthers, Denver Broncos, and New York Giants.

== College playing career ==
Tyke attended Louisiana State University (LSU), where he played wide receiver for the LSU Tigers football team.

== Coaching career ==
=== College coaching ===
Tolbert started his coaching career as a graduate assistant at LSU in the spring of 1994 before transferring to Northeast Louisiana to also work as a graduate assistant in the fall. He would go on to coach wide receivers at Ohio in the spring of 1995, before once again returning in the fall to Northeast Louisiana, where he assisted in coaching the team’s tight ends for three seasons. He would then go on to coach tight ends at Auburn in the 1998 season. Tyke would spend the next three years (1999-2001) as the wide receivers coach/recruiting coordinator at Louisiana-Lafayette, followed by a year serving as a tight ends coach/recruiting coordinator at Florida in 2002, before making the jump to the NFL the following season.

=== Start in the NFL ===
Tyke was a part of the NFL's Minority Internship Program with the Detroit Lions in training camp during 1997, and once again in 2001 with the Cardinals.

=== Arizona Cardinals ===
Tyke’s first official position in the NFL was as the wide receivers coach for the Arizona Cardinals in 2003. He would go on to help rookie wide receiver Anquan Boldin earn offensive rookie of the year.

=== Buffalo Bills ===
Tolbert would spend 6 years coaching wide receivers for the Bills.

=== Carolina Panthers ===
In 2010 Tolbert was the wide receivers coach for the Carolina Panthers.

=== Denver Broncos ===
Tolbert was the wide receivers coach for the Denver Broncos from 2011 until the end of the 2017 season. On February 7, 2016, Tolbert was part of the Broncos coaching staff that won Super Bowl 50. In the game, the Broncos defeated the Carolina Panthers by a score of 24–10.

=== New York Giants ===
On January 24, 2018, Tolbert joined the New York Giants to serve as wide receivers coach under new head coach Pat Shurmur. Following the appointment of Joe Judge as head coach in January 2020, Tolbert was retained in his role.

=== Chicago Bears ===
On February 2, 2022, Tolbert joined the Chicago Bears to serve as the wide receiver coach & passing game coordinator under head coach Matt Eberflus. On January 10, 2024, Tolbert was fired by the Bears, along with offensive coordinator Luke Getsy and quarterbacks coach Andrew Janocko.

=== Tennessee Titans ===
On February 13, 2024, the Tennessee Titans hired Tolbert as their wide receiver coach under new head coach Brian Callahan, reuniting the two coaches from when they were each on the Denver Broncos coaching staff from 2013 to 2015, including winning Super Bowl 50.

=== Miami Dolphins ===
On February 13, 2026, the Miami Dolphins hired Tolbert as their wide receivers coach.
