= Ja'Tyre Carter =

American football player (born 1999)

Profile
- Position: Guard

Personal information
- Born: January 15, 1999 (age 27); White Castle, Louisiana, U.S.
- Listed height: 6 ft 3 in (1.91 m)
- Listed weight: 311 lb (141 kg)

Career information
- High school: White Castle
- College: Southern (2017–2021)
- NFL draft: 2022: 7th round, 226th overall pick

Career history
- Chicago Bears (2022–2023); Carolina Panthers (2024–2026)*
- * Offseason or practice squad member only

Career NFL statistics as of 2024
- Games played: 13
- Games started: 2
- Stats at Pro Football Reference

Ja'Tyre Carter (born January 15, 1999) is an American professional football guard. He played college football for the Southern Jaguars, and was selected by the Chicago Bears in the seventh round of the 2022 NFL draft.

== College career ==
Carter was unranked as a recruit by 247Sports.com coming out of high school. He committed to Southern before the 2017 season.

== Professional career ==
Pre-draft measurables
Height	Weight	Arm length	Hand span	Wingspan	40-yard dash	10-yard split	20-yard split	20-yard shuttle	Three-cone drill	Vertical jump	Broad jump	Bench press
6 ft 3 3/8 in (1.91 m)	311 lb (141 kg)	33 5/8 in (0.85 m)	10 1/4 in (0.26 m)	6 ft 7 1/2 in (2.02 m)	5.13 s	1.79 s	2.98 s	4.90 s	7.65 s	34.5 in (0.88 m)	9 ft 3 in (2.82 m)	21 reps
All values from NFL Combine/Pro Day

=== Chicago Bears ===
Carter was selected by the Chicago Bears in the seventh round with the 226th overall pick of the 2022 NFL draft. As a rookie, he appeared in three games.

On August 26, 2024, Carter was waived by the Bears as part of preliminary roster cuts.

=== Carolina Panthers ===
Carter was signed to the Carolina Panthers practice squad on August 29, 2024. He signed a reserve/future contract on January 6, 2025.

On August 26, 2025, Carter was waived by the Panthers with an injury designation as part of final roster cuts. He re-signed with the Panthers practice squad on November 4. Carter signed a reserve/future contract with Carolina on January 12, 2026.

On August 30, 2026, Carter was released by the Panthers as a part of final roster cuts.
