= Luke Getsy =

American football player and coach (born 1984)

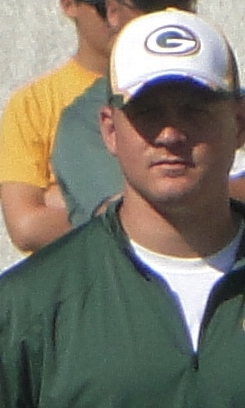
- Getsy with the Green Bay Packers in 2014

Green Bay Packers
- Title: Quarterbacks coach/assistant head coach – offense

Personal information
- Born: February 16, 1984 (age 42); Munhall, Pennsylvania, U.S.
- Listed height: 6 ft 2 in (1.88 m)
- Listed weight: 222 lb (101 kg)

Career information
- Position: Quarterback
- High school: Steel Valley (Munhall)
- College: Pittsburgh (2002–2003); Akron (2005–2006)
- NFL draft: 2007: undrafted

Career history

Playing
- San Francisco 49ers (2007)*
- * Offseason or practice squad member only

Coaching
- Akron (2007–2008) Graduate assistant; West Virginia Wesleyan (2009) Offensive coordinator & quarterbacks coach; Pittsburgh (2010) Graduate assistant; Indiana (PA) (2011–2012) Offensive coordinator & quarterbacks coach; Western Michigan (2013) Wide receivers coach; Green Bay Packers (2014–2017); Offensive quality control coach (2014–2015); Wide receivers coach (2016–2017); Mississippi State (2018) Offensive coordinator & wide receivers coach; Green Bay Packers (2019–2021); Quarterbacks coach (2019); Quarterbacks coach & passing game coordinator (2020–2021); Chicago Bears (2022–2023) Offensive coordinator; Las Vegas Raiders (2024) Offensive coordinator; Green Bay Packers (2024–present); Defensive consultant (2024); Senior offensive assistant (2025); Quarterbacks coach/assistant head coach – offense (2026–present)
- Coaching profile at Pro Football Reference

Luke John Getsy (born February 16, 1984) is an American professional football coach who is the quarterbacks coach and assistant head coach – offense for the Green Bay Packers of the National Football League (NFL). He previously served as the offensive coordinator for the Chicago Bears from 2022 to 2023 and for the Las Vegas Raiders in 2024.

Getsy played college football as a quarterback at Pittsburgh and Akron. He previously served as an assistant coach for the Green Bay Packers, Mississippi State University, Western Michigan University, Indiana University of Pennsylvania, the University of Pittsburgh, West Virginia Wesleyan College and the University of Akron.

== Early life ==
Getsy was a four year starting quarterback at Steel Valley High School.

== Playing career ==
Getsy attended the University of Pittsburgh on a football scholarship. After spending two seasons with the Panthers, Getsy transferred to the University of Akron where he led the Zips to their first ever conference championship. He also led Akron to its first-ever bowl game, the Motor City Bowl at Ford Field in Detroit. Getsy finished his career breaking 24 school records in two years as the Zips starter.

Pre-draft measurables
Height	Weight	Arm length	Hand span	40-yard dash	10-yard split	20-yard split	20-yard shuttle	Three-cone drill	Vertical jump	Broad jump
6 ft 2 1/2 in (1.89 m)	222 lb (101 kg)	31 1/2 in (0.80 m)	9 1/2 in (0.24 m)	4.95 s	1.74 s	2.87 s	4.46 s	6.95 s	32.5 in (0.83 m)	8 ft 10 in (2.69 m)
All values from NFL Combine

Getsy signed as an undrafted free agent with the San Francisco 49ers prior to the 2007 season.

== Coaching career ==
=== Akron ===
In 2007, Getsy began his coaching career at the University of Akron as a graduate assistant under head coach J. D. Brookhart.

=== West Virginia Wesleyan ===
In 2009, Getsy was hired by West Virginia Wesleyan College as their offensive coordinator, quarterbacks coach and academic coordinator.

=== Pittsburgh ===
In 2010, Getsy joined the University of Pittsburgh as a graduate assistant under head coach Dave Wannstedt.

=== Indiana University of Pennsylvania ===
In 2011, Getsy was hired as the offensive coordinator and quarterbacks coach at Indiana University of Pennsylvania under head coach Curt Cignetti.

=== Western Michigan ===
In 2013, Getsy was named the wide receivers coach at Western Michigan University under head coach P. J. Fleck.

=== Green Bay Packers ===
On February 7, 2014, Getsy was hired by the Green Bay Packers as an offensive quality control coach under head coach Mike McCarthy. In 2016, he was promoted to wide receivers coach.

=== Mississippi State ===
On December 31, 2017, Getsy was hired as the offensive coordinator and wide receivers coach at Mississippi State University.

=== Green Bay Packers (second stint) ===
On January 21, 2019, Getsy was re-hired by the Green Bay Packers as their quarterbacks coach under head coach Matt LaFleur. On March 12, 2020, he was promoted to passing game coordinator and quarterbacks coach.

=== Chicago Bears ===
On January 30, 2022, Getsy was hired by the Chicago Bears as their offensive coordinator under head coach Matt Eberflus. On January 10, 2024, Getsy was fired by the Bears, with head coach Matt Eberflus stating that the "growth and the development of the offense...needed to be better than where it was." In the same move, the Bears fired quarterbacks coach Andrew Janocko, running backs coach Omar Young, wide receivers coach Tyke Tolbert, and assistant tight ends coach Tim Zetts.

=== Las Vegas Raiders ===
On February 6, 2024, Getsy was hired by the Las Vegas Raiders as their offensive coordinator under head coach Antonio Pierce. Getsy was fired as offensive coordinator on November 3, following a 2–7 start to the season.

=== Green Bay Packers (third stint) ===
Getsy returned to the Packers during the 2024 season in a part time role, as a defensive consultant. Then on January 27, 2025, Getsy was re-hired as a senior offensive assistant. After the previous quarterbacks coach, Sean Mannion, left for Philadelphia, the Packers promoted Getsy to quarterbacks coach.

== Personal life ==
Getsy and his wife, Tina, have three sons, John, Paul, and Adam, and a daughter, Nora.
