= 2024 Chicago Bears season =

105th season in franchise history

- Owner: Virginia Halas McCaskey
- General manager: Ryan Poles
- Head coach: Matt Eberflus (fired November 29, 4–8 record); Thomas Brown (interim, 1–4 record)
- Home stadium: Soldier Field

Results
- Record: 5–12
- Division place: 4th NFC North
- Playoffs: Did not qualify
- Pro Bowlers: CB Jaylon Johnson

Uniform
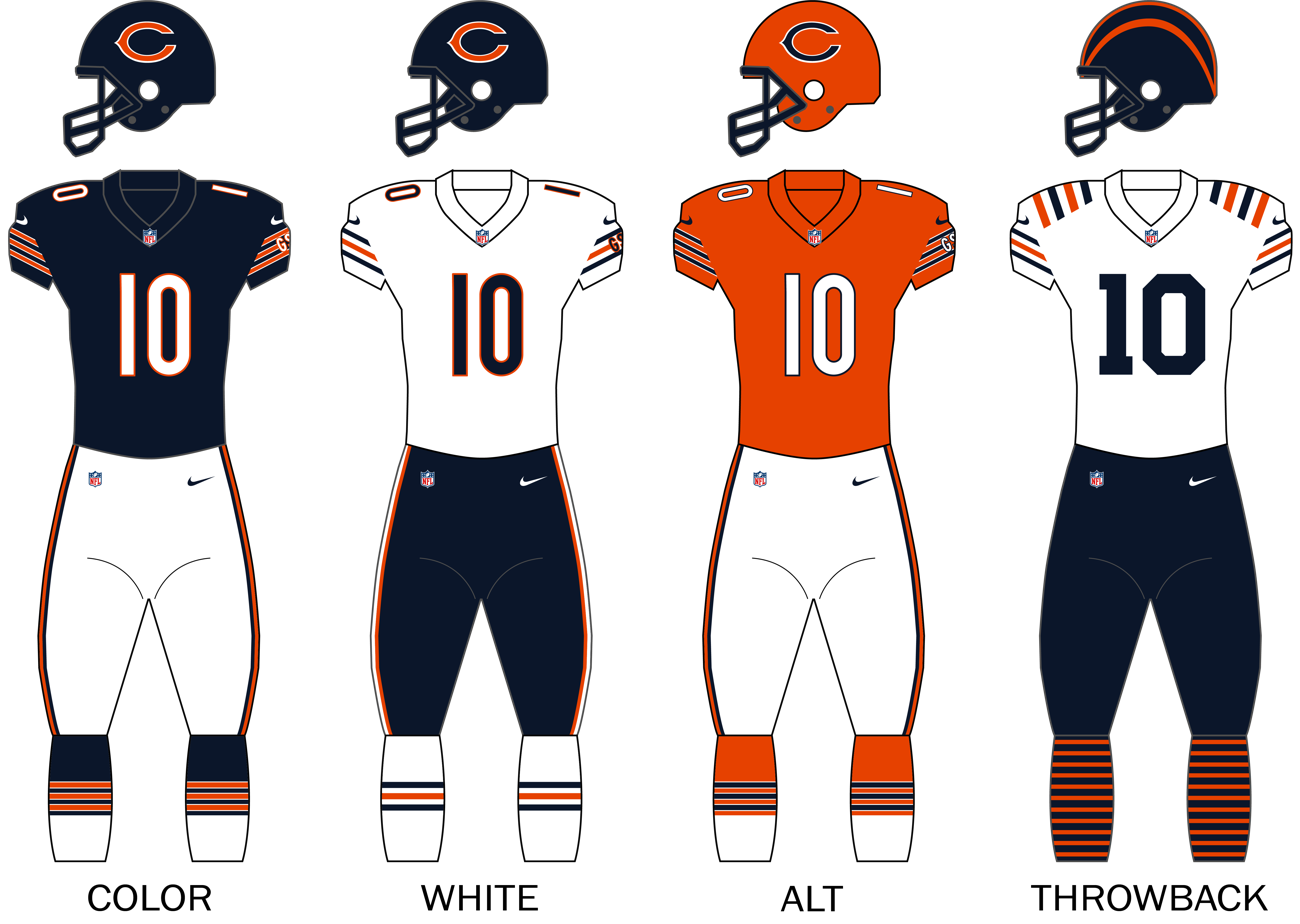

The 2024 season was the Chicago Bears' 105th in the National Football League (NFL), their third under general manager Ryan Poles, and their third and final under head coach Matt Eberflus. It was also their final season under the ownership of Virginia Halas McCaskey, who died one month after the season ended. The Bears were unable to improve on their 7–10 record from 2023 following a Week 15 loss to the Minnesota Vikings on Monday Night Football. The team was featured during the training camp edition of the HBO show Hard Knocks.

Despite a 4–2 start, their best since 2020, the Bears went on to lose 10 consecutive games, tying the franchise record set in 2022, with their first being against the Washington Commanders in the Hail Maryland game. In the last play of the game, a 52-yard Hail Mary pass that was tipped in the air by cornerback Tyrique Stevenson, who was caught taunting fans during the play, was caught in the endzone by Commanders wide receiver Noah Brown. The Bears suffered close consecutive losses to each of their division rivals, starting with the Green Bay Packers' Karl Brooks blocking a potential game-winning field goal in Week 11. In Week 12, the Bears rallied from an 11-point deficit in the last two minutes of regulation to force overtime against the Minnesota Vikings, only to lose despite winning the coin toss. On Thanksgiving Day, the Bears fell to a 4–8 record following a 23–20 loss to the Detroit Lions. Eberflus was widely criticized for his clock management in the final seconds of the game and was fired the next day, making him the first head coach to be fired midseason in the team's over century-old history. In Week 14, with Thomas Brown at interim head coach, the Bears lost against the San Francisco 49ers, ensuring a last-place finish in the division for the third straight season. Following the Commanders beating the New Orleans Saints in Week 15, the Bears were eliminated from playoff contention for the fourth consecutive season. They snapped their losing streak in the final week of the season with a 24–22 win over the Packers, their first win over their division rival since the 2018 season. Caleb Williams became the first Bears quarterback to start every game in a season since Jay Cutler did so in 2009.

== Offseason ==
=== Staff changes ===
On January 10, 2024, the Bears announced that they fired offensive coordinator Luke Getsy and four others offensive assistants. On January 23, 2024, Shane Waldron was hired as the new offensive coordinator, while Kerry Joseph was announced as the Quarterbacks coach three days later. On January 27, 2024, Eric Washington was named the defensive coordinator.

On February 21, 2024, the Bears announced the hiring of additional six coaches: offensive passing game coordinator Thomas Brown, running backs coach Chad Morton, receivers coach Chris Beatty, assistant offensive line coach Jason Houghtaling, assistant quarterbacks and receivers coach Robbie Picazo and assistant running backs coach Jennifer King. King would make history, as the first female coach in Bears history. Chavis Cook was hired as the coaching administration manager. On February 23, the Bears added Ryan Griffin as assistant quarterbacks and receivers coach and Bryan Bing as assistant defensive line coach. On February 26, Matt Pees was added as defensive analyst-advance/special projects.

In addition, three other coaches were promoted: Offensive line coach Chris Morgan promoted to run game coordinator; assistant defensive backs coach, David Overstreet II to Nickelbacks coach and administrative coaching assistant, Kenny Norton III to defensive quality control coach.

Chicago Bears Staff Changes
Coach	Position	Reason left	Replacement(s)
Cliff Stein	Senior vice president/general counsel	Fired	-
Sean Magee	Coaching chief of staff	Accepted job at the University of Michigan	Chavis Cook (Coaching administration manager)
Luke Getsy	Offensive coordinator	Fired (Later accepted job with Las Vegas Raiders)	Shane Waldron
Alan Williams	Defensive coordinator	Resigned mid-season	Eric Washington
Tyke Tolbert	Passing game coordinator/ wide receivers coach	Fired (Later accepted job with Tennessee Titans)	Thomas Brown (Passing game coordinator)
Tyke Tolbert	Passing game coordinator/ wide receivers coach	Fired (Later accepted job with Tennessee Titans)	Chris Beatty (Wide receivers coach)
Phil Snow	Senior defensive analyst	Contract expired	Matt Pees (Defensive analyst-advance/special projects)
Andrew Janocko	Quarterbacks coach	Fired (Later accepted job with New Orleans Saints)	Kerry Joseph
Omar Young	Interim running backs coach/ assistant quarterbacks coach	Fired	Chad Morton (Running backs coach)
Omar Young	Interim running backs coach/ assistant quarterbacks coach	Fired	Robbie Picazo & Ryan Griffin (Assistant quarterbacks/wide receivers)
Luke Steckel	Assistant offensive line coach	Accepted job with Las Vegas Raiders	Jason Houghtaling
Tim Zetts	Assistant tight ends coach	Fired	-
Assistant running backs			Jennifer King
Justin Hinds	Assistant defensive line	Accepted job with the Seattle Seahawks	Bryan Bing

==== Bill Walsh Diversity coaches ====
The Bears added six coaches from the NFL's Bill Walsh Diversity Coaching Fellowship Program: Michael Bellamy II (assistant wide receivers/senior offensive analyst/special teams assistant, Howard), Stefon Wheeler (run game coordinator/offensive line coach, Yale), Angela Rowe (head flag football coach, Huntingdon College), Michael Bearden (assistant wide receivers graduate assistant, Notre Dame), Yosef Fares (head coach, Justin Garza High School) and Anthony Blevins (defensive assistant, Birmingham Stallions).

=== Roster changes ===
==== Free agents ====
Position	Player	Tag	2024 team	Date signed	Contract
OLB	Dylan Cole	UFA			
OG	Dan Feeney	UFA	Minnesota Vikings	March 15, 2024	1 year, $3.5 million
RB	D'Onta Foreman	UFA	Cleveland Browns	March 20, 2024	1 year, $1.125 million
DE	Rasheem Green	UFA			
CB	Jaylon Johnson	UFA	Chicago Bears	March 11, 2024	4 year, $76 million
DT	Justin Jones	UFA	Arizona Cardinals	March 14, 2024	3 year, $30 million
TE	Marcedes Lewis	UFA	Chicago Bears	June 9, 2024	1 year, TBA
WR	Darnell Mooney	UFA	Atlanta Falcons	March 15, 2024	3 year, $39 million
DE	Yannick Ngakoue	UFA			
C	Lucas Patrick	UFA	New Orleans Saints	May 12, 2024	1 year, minimum
QB	Nathan Peterman	UFA	New Orleans Saints	March 18, 2024	1 year, minimum
LS	Patrick Scales	UFA	Chicago Bears	March 10, 2024	1 year, $1 million
WR	Equanimeous St. Brown	UFA	New Orleans Saints	April 12, 2024	1 year, TBA
CB	Greg Stroman	UFA	Chicago Bears		1 year, minimum
WR/PR	Trent Taylor	UFA	San Francisco 49ers	April 16, 2024	1 year, TBA
TE	Robert Tonyan	UFA	Minnesota Vikings	May 16, 2024	1 year, TBA
WR	Collin Johnson	RFA	Chicago Bears	March 8, 2024	1 year, minimum
CB	Josh Blackwell	ERFA	Chicago Bears	March 13, 2024	1 year, minimum
WR	Joe Reed	ERFA			
RFA: Restricted free agent, UFA: Unrestricted free agent, ERFA: Exclusive rights free agent LEGEND – Light green background indicates a player has been re-signed by the Bears. – Light red background indicates a player has departed the Bears.

==== Signings ====
Position	Player	Previous team	Date signed	Contract
FS	Tarvarius Moore	Green Bay Packers	March 8, 2024	1 year, minimum
FS	Kevin Byard	Philadelphia Eagles	March 10, 2024	2 year, $15 million
RB	D'Andre Swift	Philadelphia Eagles	March 13, 2024	3 year, $24 million
TE	Gerald Everett	Los Angeles Chargers	March 13, 2024	2 year, $12 million
SS	Jonathan Owens	Green Bay Packers	March 13, 2024	2 year, $4.5 million
OT	Matt Pryor	San Francisco 49ers	March 13, 2024	1 year, $1 million
QB	Brett Rypien	New York Jets	March 13, 2024	1 year, minimum
LB	Amen Ogbongbemiga	Los Angeles Chargers	March 14, 2024	1 year, $2.1 million
C	Coleman Shelton	Los Angeles Rams	March 15, 2024	1 year, $3.5 million
WR	Dante Pettis	-	March 15, 2024	1 year, minimum
DE	Jacob Martin	Indianapolis Colts	March 16, 2024	1 year, minimum
OT	Jake Curhan	Seattle Seahawks	March 18, 2024	1 year, minimum
DE	Byron Cowart	Miami Dolphins	March 18, 2024	1 year, minimum

===== Reserve/future contracts =====
The Bears signed the following players to reserve/future contracts: Micah Baskerville (LB), Stephen Carlson (TE), Jerome Carvin (G), Adrian Colbert (FS), Douglas Coleman III (SS), Aviante Collins (T), Michael Dwumfour (DT), Daniel Hardy (DE), Khalid Kareem (DE), Doug Kramer (C), Cameron Lyons (LS), Roy Mbaeteka (T), Bill Murray (G), Corliss Waitman (P) and Nsimba Webster (WR). Mbaeteka was later released.

==== Trade acquisitions ====
Position	Player	Previous team	Date	Traded away
G/C	Ryan Bates	Buffalo Bills	March 13, 2024	2024 fifth-round selection
WR	Keenan Allen	Los Angeles Chargers	March 14, 2024	2024 fourth-round selection
DE	Darrell Taylor	Seattle Seahawks	August 23, 2024	2025 sixth-round selection

==== Departures ====
Position	Player	Reason	Date	2024 team	Notes
FS	Eddie Jackson	Released	February 15, 2024	Baltimore Ravens	
G	Cody Whitehair	Released	February 15, 2024	Las Vegas Raiders	
QB	Justin Fields	Traded	March 16, 2024	Pittsburgh Steelers	Bears received conditional 2025 sixth-round selection (failed to convert to 4th as Fields played in less than 51% of the Steelers' snaps in 2024)

== Draft ==
2024 Chicago Bears draft selections
Round	Selection	Player	Position	College	Notes
1	1	Caleb Williams	QB	USC	From Panthers (Note: The Bears traded a 2023 first-round selection (1st overall) to the Carolina Panthers in exchange for a first-round selection (1st overall), 2023 first and second-round selections (9th and 61st overall), a 2025 second-round selection, and WR D. J. Moore.)
1	9	Rome Odunze	WR	Washington	
2	40	Traded to the Washington Commanders (Note: The Bears traded a second-round selection (40th overall) to the Washington Commanders in exchange for DE Montez Sweat.)			
3	75	Kiran Amegadjie	OT	Yale	
4	110	Traded to the Los Angeles Chargers (Note: The Bears traded a fourth-round selection (110th overall) to the Los Angeles Chargers in exchange for WR Keenan Allen.)			
4	122	Tory Taylor	P	Iowa	From Eagles (Note: The Bears traded a 2023 first-round selection to the Philadelphia Eagles in exchange for a fourth-round selection (122nd overall) and a 2023 first-round selection.)
5	144	Austin Booker	DE	Kansas	From Bears (Note: The Bears traded a fifth-round selection (144th overall) to the Buffalo Bills in exchange for G/C Ryan Bates.) via Bills (Note: The Bears traded a 2025 fourth-round selection to the Buffalo Bills in exchange for a fifth-round selection (144th overall).)
6	184	Traded to the Miami Dolphins (Note: The Bears traded a sixth-round selection (184th overall) to the Miami Dolphins in exchange for G Dan Feeney.)			
7	231	Traded to the New England Patriots (Note: The Bears traded a seventh-round selection (231st overall) to the New England Patriots in exchange for WR N'Keal Harry.)			

2024 Chicago Bears undrafted free agents
Name	Position	College	Ref.
Brenden Bates	TE	Kentucky	
Theo Benedet	OT	UBC	
Carl Jones Jr.	LB	UCLA	
Jamree Kromah	DE	James Madison	
Peter LeBlanc	WR	Louisiana	
Keith Randolph Jr.	DT	Illinois	
Austin Reed	QB	Western Kentucky	
Reddy Steward	CB	Troy	
Ian Wheeler	RB	Howard	
Jaylon Hutchings	DT	Texas Tech	

Draft trades

=== Rookie minicamp participants ===
The following unsigned undrafted free agents participated in the Bears' rookie minicamp from May 9 to 11: LB Brian Abraham, Albany; OT Noah Atagi, Weber State; RB T. D. Ayo-Durojaiye, Villanova; DB Travian Blaylock, Wisconsin; DB Russell Dandy, Eastern Illinois; DT Mark Ho Ching, Northern Arizona; WR John Jackson, USC; DB Patrick Jolly, Abilene Christian; DB Leon Jones, Arkansas State; DT Dashaun Mallory, Arizona State; S Samuel Matthews, Texas A&M; DE John McCartan, Oregon State; LB Rich Miller Jr., Kansas; LB Paul Moala, Georgia Tech; WR R.J. Mobley, Winston-Salem; DB Decorian Patterson, UCF; DB Kendarin Ray, Tulsa; WR Marcus Rogers, Troy; OG David Satkowski, Stonehill; TE Geor'quarius Spivey, Mississippi State; OG Kameron Stutts, Auburn; OG Donald Ventrelli, North Dakota; TE Shelton Zeon, UNLV. Jackson, Jones, Mallory and Moala would later signed with the team.

== Staff ==
On November 12, 2024, the Bears fired offensive coordinator Shane Waldron, after only nine games, and appointed passing game coordinator Thomas Brown as the interim offensive coordinator. It was the first ever change in the middle of the season since Perry Moss became Chicago's first designated OC in 1970. On November 29, 2024 Head coach Matt Eberflus was fired amid six game losing streak, and the team appointed Brown as the first ever interim head coach in franchise history, just 17 days after being promoted to interim offensive coordinator. On December 2, 2024, wide receivers coach Chris Beatty was subsequently promoted to interim offensive coordinator under Brown.

2024 Chicago Bears staff
Front office: Secretary of the board of directors – Virginia Halas McCaskey; Chairman – George McCaskey; President/CEO – Kevin Warren; General manager – Ryan Poles; Assistant general manager – Ian Cunningham; Senior director of player personnel – Jeff King; Director of player personnel – Trey Koziol; Director of college scouting – Breck Ackley; Director of pro scouting – DJ Hord; Director of football administration – Matt Feinstein; Director of football analytics – Krithi Chandrakasan; Head coaches: Head coach – Matt Eberflus (fired on November 29); Interim head coach – Thomas Brown; Offensive coaches: Offensive coordinator – Shane Waldron (fired on November 10); Interim offensive coordinator – Chris Beatty; Quarterbacks – Kerry Joseph; Running backs – Chad Morton; Tight ends – Jim Dray; Offensive line/offensive run game coordinator – Chris Morgan; Assistant offensive line – Jason Houghtaling; Offensive assistant (quarterbacks/wide receivers) – Ryan Griffin; Offensive assistant (quarterbacks/wide receivers) – Robbie Picazo; Offensive assistant (running backs) – Jennifer King; Offensive quality control – Zach Cable	Defensive coaches: Defensive coordinator – Eric Washington; Defensive line – Travis Smith; Assistant defensive line – Brian Bing; Linebackers – Dave Borgonzi; Cornerbacks/defensive passing game coordinator – Jon Hoke; Nickelbacks – David Overstreet II; Safeties – Andre Curtis; Defensive quality control – Kevin Koch; Defensive quality control – Kenny Norton III; Defensive analyst (advance/special projects) – Matt Pees; Special teams coaches: Special teams coordinator – Richard Hightower; Assistant special teams – Carlos Polk; Director of research and analysis – Harrison Freid; Coaching administration manager – Chavis Cook; Strength and conditioning: Head strength and conditioning – Jim Arthur; Assistant strength and conditioning – Noble Landry; Assistant strength and conditioning – Pierre Ngo

== Final roster ==
2024 Chicago Bears roster
Quarterbacks (QB): 17 Tyson Bagent; 18 Caleb Williams; Running backs (RB): 25 Darrynton Evans; 20 Travis Homer; 23 Roschon Johnson; 4 D'Andre Swift; Wide receivers (WR): 13 Keenan Allen; 80 Collin Johnson; 2 D. J. Moore; 10 Tyler Scott; 15 Rome Odunze; Tight ends (TE): 14 Gerald Everett; 85 Cole Kmet; 84 Marcedes Lewis	Offensive linemen (OL): 72 Kiran Amegadjie T; 75 Larry Borom T; 73 Jake Curhan G/T; 76 Teven Jenkins G; 68 Doug Kramer Jr. C; 79 Matt Pryor G/T; 65 Coleman Shelton C; 58 Darnell Wright T; Defensive linemen (DL): 94 Austin Booker DE; 93 Byron Cowart DT; 99 Gervon Dexter DT; 64 Jonathan Ford DT; 92 Daniel Hardy DE; 55 Jacob Martin DE; 96 Zacch Pickens DT; 90 Dominique Robinson DE; 98 Montez Sweat DE; 52 Darrell Taylor DE; 95 DeMarcus Walker DE; 91 Chris Williams DT	Linebackers (LB): 49 Tremaine Edmunds OLB; 53 T. J. Edwards OLB; 45 Amen Ogbongbemiga MLB; 57 Jack Sanborn OLB; 44 Noah Sewell OLB; Defensive backs (DB): 39 Josh Blackwell CB; 31 Kevin Byard FS; 24 Adrian Colbert FS; 6 Kyler Gordon CB; 22 Elijah Hicks SS; 1 Jaylon Johnson CB; 30 Tarvarius Moore FS; 36 Jonathan Owens SS; 32 Terell Smith CB; 38 Ameer Speed CB; 29 Tyrique Stevenson CB; Special teams (ST): 46 Scott Daly LS; 8 Cairo Santos K; 19 Tory Taylor P	Practice squad: 47 Micah Baskerville MLB; 62 Theo Benedet T; 35 Royce Freeman RB; 63 Chris Glaser G; 82 John Jackson WR; 50 Carl Jones Jr. OLB; 59 Jamree Kromah DE; 69 Dashaun Mallory DT; 16 Austin Reed QB; 27 Reddy Steward CB; 67 Ricky Stromberg C; 87 Tommy Sweeney TE (PS/I); 83 Samori Toure WR; 86 Joel Wilson TE; 26 JT Woods SS; Reserve: 71 Ryan Bates G (IR); 97 Andrew Billings DT (IR); 9 Jaquan Brisker SS (IR); 88 Stephen Carlson TE (IR); 11 DeAndre Carter WR (IR); 38 Douglas Coleman III SS (IR); 70 Braxton Jones T (IR); 21 Jaylon Jones CB (IR); 60 Bill Murray G (IR); 48 Patrick Scales LS (IR); -- Nsimba Webster WR (IR); 33 Ian Wheeler RB (IR); Rookies in italics 53 active, 12 reserve, 14 practice squad (1 exempt)

== Preseason ==
=== Schedule ===
On March 26, the National Football League announced that the Bears would play the Houston Texans in the Pro Football Hall of Fame Game at 7:00 p.m. CDT on Thursday, August 1, at Tom Benson Hall of Fame Stadium in Canton, Ohio. The Bears were represented by Devin Hester, Steve McMichael and Julius Peppers. The two teams were also scheduled to meet in Houston in Week 2 of the regular season.

Week	Date	Opponent	Result	Record	Venue	Recap
HOF	August 1	vs. Houston Texans	W 21–17	1–0	Tom Benson Hall of Fame Stadium	Recap
1	August 10	at Buffalo Bills	W 33–6	2–0	Highmark Stadium	Recap
2	August 17	Cincinnati Bengals	W 27–3	3–0	Soldier Field	Recap
3	August 22	at Kansas City Chiefs	W 34–21	4–0	Arrowhead Stadium	Recap

=== Game summaries ===
==== Hall of Fame Game ====
Hall of Fame Game: Houston Texans at Chicago Bears – Game summary

Quarter	1	2	3	4	Total
Texans	7	10	0	-	17
Bears	0	14	7	-	21

at Tom Benson Hall of Fame Stadium, Canton, Ohio

- Date: August 1
- Game time: 7:00 p.m. CST
- Game weather: 86 °F (30 °C)
- Game attendance: 17,528
- Referee: John Hussey
- TV announcers (ESPN/ABC): Joe Buck, Troy Aikman, and Lisa Salters
- Recap, Game Book

Game information

First quarter

- HOU – Teagan Quitoriano 9-yard pass from Davis Mills (Kaʻimi Fairbairn kick), 8:39. Texans 7–0. Drive: 13 plays, 74 yards, 6:21.

Second quarter

- HOU – Kaʻimi Fairbairn 33-yard field goal, 12:13. Texans 10–0. Drive: 12 plays, 74 yards, 6:45.
- CHI – Collin Johnson 20-yard pass from Brett Rypien (Cairo Santos kick), 8:22. Texans 10–7. Drive: 8 plays, 80 yards, 3:51.
- HOU – Cam Akers 4-yard pass from Case Keenum (Kaʻimi Fairbairn kick), 1:44. Texans 17–7. Drive: 9 plays, 70 yards, 3:42.
- CHI – Tommy Sweeney 22-yard pass from Brett Rypien (Cairo Santos kick), 0:46. Texans 17–14. Drive: 5 plays, 72 yards, 0:58.

Third quarter

- CHI – Collin Johnson 9-yard pass from Brett Rypien (Cairo Santos kick), 11:39. Bears 21–17. Drive: 8 plays, 68 yards, 3:21.

Top passers

- HOU – Davis Mills – 10/13, 102 yards, TD
- CHI – Brett Rypien – 11/15, 166 yards, 3 TD

Top rushers

- HOU – J. J. Taylor – 6 rushes, 16 yards
- CHI – Khalil Herbert – 4 rushes, 35 yards

Top receivers

- HOU – Xavier Hutchinson – 5 receptions, 56 yards
- CHI – Collin Johnson – 3 receptions, 56 yards, 2 TD

Due to lightning in the area, the game was called during the third quarter and the Bears were declared the winners.

==== Week 1: at Buffalo Bills ====
Preseason Week 1: Chicago Bears at Buffalo Bills – Game summary

Quarter	1	2	3	4	Total
Bears	6	0	7	20	33
Bills	0	3	3	0	6

at Highmark Stadium, Orchard Park, New York

- Date: August 10
- Game time: 12:00 p.m. CST
- Game weather: Sunny, 71 °F (22 °C)
- Game attendance: 69,126
- Referee: Craig Wrolstad (4)
- TV: WFLD/NFLN
- Recap, Game Book

Game information

First quarter

- CHI – Cairo Santos 30-yard field goal, 10:03. Bears 3–0. Drive: 8 plays, 58 yards, 4:57.
- CHI – Cairo Santos 31-yard field goal, 2:13. Bears 6–0. Drive: 12 plays, 84 yards, 5:39.

Second quarter

- BUF – Tyler Bass 24-yard field goal, 9:15. Bears 6–3. Drive: 18 plays, 78 yards, 7:58.

Third quarter

- CHI – Velus Jones 4-yard run (Cairo Santos kick), 7:46. Bears 13–3. Drive: 8 plays, 59 yards, 4:28.
- BUF – Tyler Bass 49-yard field goal, 2:54. Bears 13–6. Drive: 9 plays, 36 yards, 4:52.

Fourth quarter

- CHI – Micah Baskerville 53-yard interception return (kick failed, wide left), 14:08. Bears 19–6.
- CHI – Ian Wheeler 7-yard run (Cairo Santos kick), 6:03. Bears 26–6. Drive: 3 plays, 37 yards, 1:11.
- CHI – Ian Wheeler 8-yard run (Cairo Santos kick), 2:24. Bears 33–6. Drive: 3 plays, 35 yards, 1:40.

Top passers

- CHI – Caleb Williams – 4/7, 95 yards
- BUF – Mitchell Trubisky – 10/18, 82 yards

Top rushers

- CHI – Ian Wheeler – 5 rushes, 43 yards, 2 TD
- BUF – Shane Buechele – 3 rushes, 22 yards

Top receivers

- CHI – D'Andre Swift – 1 reception, 42 yards
- BUF – Khalil Shakir – 3 receptions, 28 yards

==== Week 2: vs Cincinnati Bengals ====
Preseason Week 2: Cincinnati Bengals at Chicago Bears – Game summary

Quarter	1	2	3	4	Total
Bengals	0	3	0	0	3
Bears	0	10	14	3	27

at Soldier Field, Chicago, Illinois

- Date: August 17
- Game time: 12:00 p.m. CST
- Game weather: Mostly cloudy, 74 °F (23 °C)
- Game attendance: 59,829
- Referee: Tra Blake (3)
- TV: WFLD/NFLN
- Recap, Game Book

Game information

First quarter

- No scoring plays.

Second quarter

- CHI – Cairo Santos 37-yard field goal, 9:08. Bears 3–0. Drive: 5 plays, 55 yards, 2:53.
- CHI – Caleb Williams 7-yard run (Cairo Santos kick), 1:33. Bears 10–0. Drive: 8 plays, 90 yards, 3:19.
- CIN – Evan McPherson 54-yard field goal, 0:00. Bears 10–3. Drive: 7 plays, 30 yards, 1:33.

Third quarter

- CHI – Dante Pettis 4-yard pass from Tyson Bagent (Cairo Santos kick), 7:46. Bears 17–3. Drive: 9 plays, 42 yards, 4:30.
- CHI – Dante Pettis 25-yard pass from Tyson Bagent (Cairo Santos kick), 3:18. Bears 24–3. Drive: 4 plays, 56 yards, 2:01.

Fourth quarter

- CHI – Cairo Santos 51-yard field goal, 10:17. Bears 27–3. Drive: 6 plays, 17 yards, 3:24.

Top passers

- CIN – Logan Woodside – 17/25, 132 yards, 2 INT
- CHI – Tyson Bagent – 7/8, 87 yards, 2 TD

Top rushers

- CIN – Noah Cain – 8 rushes, 28 yards
- CHI – Khalil Herbert – 5 rushes, 31 yards

Top receivers

- CIN – Kwamie Lassiter II – 5 receptions, 33 yards
- CHI – Dante Pettis – 3 receptions, 53 yards, 2 TD

==== Week 3: at Kansas City Chiefs ====
Preseason Week 3: Chicago Bears at Kansas City Chiefs – Game summary

Quarter	1	2	3	4	Total
Bears	7	13	14	0	34
Chiefs	0	7	0	14	21

at Arrowhead Stadium, Kansas City, Missouri

- Date: August 22
- Game time: 7:20 p.m. CST
- Game weather: 78 °F (26 °C)
- Game attendance: 72,717
- Referee: Clete Blakeman (34)
- TV: WFLD/NFLN
- Recap, Game Book

Game information

First quarter

- CHI – Tyson Bagent 5-yard run (Cairo Santos kick), 11:23. Bears 7–0. Drive: 7 plays, 73 yards, 3:37.

Second quarter

- CHI – Cairo Santos 32-yard field goal, 14:06. Bears 10–0. Drive: 10 plays, 37 yards, 5:01.
- KC – Carson Steele 1-yard run (Harrison Butker kick), 7:50. Bears 10–7. Drive: 3 plays, 50 yards, 1:07.
- CHI – Cairo Santos 37-yard field goal, 0:43. Bears 13–7. Drive: 7 plays, 54 yards, 1:53.
- CHI – Reddy Steward 48-yard interception return (Cairo Santos kick), 0:22. Bears 20–7.

Third quarter

- CHI – Tommy Sweeney 6-yard pass from Austin Reed (Cairo Santos kick), 6:19. Bears 27–7. Drive: 11 plays, 92 yards, 6:01.
- CHI – Velus Jones 39-yard run (Cairo Santos kick), 0:28. Bears 34–7. Drive: 7 plays, 66 yards, 3:45.

Fourth quarter

- KC – Cornell Powell 7-yard pass from Ian Book (Harrison Butker kick), 10:27. Bears 34–14. Drive: 10 plays, 65 yards, 5:01.
- KC – Baylor Cupp 10-yard pass from Ian Book (Harrison Butker kick), 3:29. Bears 34–21. Drive: 3 plays, 63 yards, 1:38.

Top passers

- CHI – Brett Rypien – 9/13, 106 yards
- KC – Ian Book – 6/9, 71 yards, 2 TD

Top rushers

- CHI – Velus Jones – 13 rushes, 111 yards, TD
- KC – Carson Steele – 4 rushes, 50 yards, TD

Top receivers

- CHI – Tyler Scott – 6 receptions, 99 yards
- KC – Montrell Washington – 1 reception, 49 yards

== Regular season ==
=== Schedule ===
Week	Date	Opponent	Result	Record	Venue	Recap
1	September 8	Tennessee Titans	**W** 24–17	1–0	Soldier Field	Recap
2	September 15	at Houston Texans	**L** 13–19	1–1	NRG Stadium	Recap
3	September 22	at Indianapolis Colts	**L** 16–21	1–2	Lucas Oil Stadium	Recap
4	September 29	Los Angeles Rams	**W** 24–18	2–2	Soldier Field	Recap
5	October 6	Carolina Panthers	**W** 36–10	3–2	Soldier Field	Recap
6	October 13	Jacksonville Jaguars	**W** 35–16	4–2	(United Kingdom) Tottenham Hotspur Stadium (London)	Recap
7	Bye					
8	October 27	at Washington Commanders	**L** 15–18	4–3	Northwest Stadium	Recap
9	November 3	at Arizona Cardinals	**L** 9–29	4–4	State Farm Stadium	Recap
10	November 10	New England Patriots	**L** 3–19	4–5	Soldier Field	Recap
11	November 17	**Green Bay Packers**	**L** 19–20	4–6	Soldier Field	Recap
12	November 24	**Minnesota Vikings**	**L** 27–30 (OT)	4–7	Soldier Field	Recap
13	November 28	at **Detroit Lions**	**L** 20–23	4–8	Ford Field	Recap
14	December 8	at San Francisco 49ers	**L** 13–38	4–9	Levi's Stadium	Recap
15	December 16	at **Minnesota Vikings**	**L** 12–30	4–10	U.S. Bank Stadium	Recap
16	December 22	**Detroit Lions**	**L** 17–34	4–11	Soldier Field	Recap
17	December 26	Seattle Seahawks	**L** 3–6	4–12	Soldier Field	Recap
18	January 5	at **Green Bay Packers**	**W** 24–22	5–12	Lambeau Field	Recap
Note: Intra-division opponents are in **bold** text.

=== Game summaries ===
==== Week 1: vs. Tennessee Titans ====
Week 1: Tennessee Titans at Chicago Bears – Game summary

Quarter	1	2	3	4	Total
Titans	7	10	0	0	**17**
**Bears**	0	3	7	14	**24**

at Soldier Field, Chicago, Illinois

- Date: September 8
- Game time: 12:00 p.m. CDT
- Game weather: Mostly sunny, 67 °F (19 °C)
- Game attendance: 59,403
- Referee: Shawn Smith
- TV announcers (Fox): Adam Amin, Mark Sanchez and Kristina Pink
- Recap, Game Book

Game information

**First quarter**

- TEN – Tony Pollard 26-yard run (Nick Folk kick), 0:41. Titans 7–0. **Drive: 8 plays, 79 yards, 4:45.**

**Second quarter**

- TEN – Nick Folk 40-yard field goal, 14:06. Titans 10–0. **Drive: 4 plays, 1 yard, 1:35.**
- TEN – Chig Okonkwo 17-yard pass from Will Levis (Nick Folk kick), 3:44. Titans 17–0. **Drive: 14 plays, 73 yards, 8:23.**
- CHI – Cairo Santos 24-yard field goal, 0:27. Titans 17–3. **Drive: 9 plays, 28 yards, 3:17.**

**Third quarter**

- CHI – Jonathan Owens 21-yard return of blocked punt (Cairo Santos kick), 9:07. Titans 17–10. **Drive: 6 plays, 8 yards, 3:19.**

**Fourth quarter**

- CHI – Cairo Santos 50-yard field goal, 14:47. Titans 17–13. **Drive: 11 plays, 44 yards, 3:59.**
- CHI – Cairo Santos 48-yard field goal, 9:52. Titans 17–16. **Drive: 4 plays, 1 yard, 1:52.**
- CHI – Tyrique Stevenson 43-yard interception return (Caleb Williams–D'Andre Swift pass), 7:35. Bears 24–17. **Drive: 4 plays, 15 yards, 2:17.**

**Top passers**

- TEN – Will Levis – 19/32, 127 yards, TD, 2 INT
- CHI – Caleb Williams – 14/29, 93 yards

**Top rushers**

- TEN – Tony Pollard – 16 rushes, 82 yards, TD
- CHI – D'Andre Swift – 10 rushes, 30 yards

**Top receivers**

- TEN – Calvin Ridley – 3 receptions, 50 yards
- CHI – D. J. Moore – 5 receptions, 36 yards

Despite falling behind 17–0 and failing to score an offensive touchdown, the Bears rallied to beat the Titans in their season opener with touchdowns on returns of a blocked punt and interception. Caleb Williams, despite finishing with just 93 passing yards, became the first #1 overall pick to win his first NFL start since David Carr in 2002.

==== Week 2: at Houston Texans ====
Week 2: Chicago Bears at Houston Texans – Game summary

Quarter	1	2	3	4	Total
Bears	3	7	0	3	**13**
**Texans**	3	13	0	3	**19**

at NRG Stadium, Houston, Texas

- Date: September 15
- Game time: 7:20 p.m. CDT
- Game weather: Clear, 89 °F (32 °C) (retractable roof open)
- Game attendance: 71,412
- Referee: Land Clark
- TV announcers (NBC): Mike Tirico, Cris Collinsworth and Melissa Stark
- Recap, Game Book

Game information

**First quarter**

- HOU – Kaʻimi Fairbairn 56-yard field goal, 10:20. Texans 3–0. **Drive: 8 plays, 33 yards, 4:40.**
- CHI – Cairo Santos 53-yard field goal, 3:51. Tied 3–3. **Drive: 11 plays, 42 yards, 6:29.**

**Second quarter**

- HOU – Nico Collins 28-yard pass from C. J. Stroud (Kaʻimi Fairbairn kick), 14:55. Texans 10–3. **Drive: 8 plays, 77 yards, 3:56.**
- HOU – Kaʻimi Fairbairn 47-yard field goal, 9:55. Texans 13–3. **Drive: 8 plays, 48 yards, 3:38.**
- CHI – Khalil Herbert 2-yard run (Cairo Santos kick), 0:32. Texans 13–10. **Drive: 8 plays, 49 yards, 3:10.**
- HOU – Kaʻimi Fairbairn 59-yard field goal, 0:01. Texans 16–10. **Drive: 5 plays, 24 yards, 0:31.**

**Third quarter**

- No scoring plays.

**Fourth quarter**

- HOU – Kaʻimi Fairbairn 53-yard field goal, 13:39. Texans 19–10. **Drive: 7 plays, 32 yards, 2:11.**
- CHI – Cairo Santos 54-yard field goal, 2:51. Texans 19–13. **Drive: 12 plays, 61 yards, 3:37.**

**Top passers**

- CHI – Caleb Williams – 23/37, 174 yards, 2 INT
- HOU – C. J. Stroud – 23/36, 260 yards, TD

**Top rushers**

- CHI – Caleb Williams – 5 rushes, 44 yards
- HOU – Cam Akers – 7 rushes, 32 yards

**Top receivers**

- CHI – D. J. Moore – 6 receptions, 53 yards
- HOU – Nico Collins – 8 receptions, 135 yards, TD

The Bears offense continued to struggle, as Caleb Williams threw two interceptions. With the loss, the Bears fell to 1–1.

==== Week 3: at Indianapolis Colts ====
Week 3: Chicago Bears at Indianapolis – Game summary

Quarter	1	2	3	4	Total
Bears	0	0	3	13	**16**
**Colts**	0	7	7	7	**21**

at Lucas Oil Stadium, Indianapolis, Indiana

- Date: September 22
- Game time: 1:00 p.m. EDT/12:00 p.m. CDT
- Game weather: None (retractable roof closed)
- Game attendance: 66,624
- Referee: Adrian Hill
- TV announcers (CBS): Andrew Catalon, Tiki Barber, Jason McCourty and A.J. Ross
- Recap, Game Book

Game information

**First quarter**

- No scoring plays.

**Second quarter**

- IND – Jonathan Taylor 29-yard run (Matt Gay kick), 8:19. Colts 7–0. **Drive: 3 plays, 70 yards, 1:16.**

**Third quarter**

- CHI – Cairo Santos 53-yard field goal, 12:51. Colts 7–3. **Drive: 5 plays, 18 yards, 2:01.**
- IND – Trey Sermon 1-yard run (Matt Gay kick), 0:21. Colts 14–3. **Drive: 9 plays, 80 yards, 5:30.**

**Fourth quarter**

- CHI – Rome Odunze 1-yard pass from Caleb Williams (pass failed), 8:21. Colts 14–9. **Drive: 13 plays, 70 yards, 7:00.**
- IND – Jonathan Taylor 1-yard run (Matt Gay kick), 5:22. Colts 21–9. **Drive: 4 plays, 16 yards, 1:24.**
- CHI – Cole Kmet 6-yard pass from Caleb Williams (Cairo Santos kick), 2:01. Colts 21–16. **Drive: 12 plays, 70 yards, 3:21.**

**Top passers**

- CHI – Caleb Williams – 33/52, 363 yards, 2 TD, 2 INT
- IND – Anthony Richardson – 10/20, 167 yards, 2 INT

**Top rushers**

- CHI – Roschon Johnson – 8 rushes, 30 yards
- IND – Jonathan Taylor – 23 rushes, 110 yards, 2 TD

**Top receivers**

- CHI – Rome Odunze – 6 receptions, 112 yards, TD
- IND – Alec Pierce – 1 reception, 44 yards

Caleb Williams put up his best game of the season to date, throwing for 363 yards, but also threw two interceptions and lost a fumble. With the loss, the Bears fell to 1–2.

==== Week 4: vs. Los Angeles Rams ====
Week 4: Los Angeles Rams at Chicago Bears – Game summary

Quarter	1	2	3	4	Total
Rams	3	3	3	9	**18**
**Bears**	0	10	7	7	**24**

at Soldier Field, Chicago, Illinois

- Date: September 29
- Game time: 12:00 p.m. CDT
- Game weather: Mostly cloudy, 70 °F (21 °C)
- Game attendance: 59,074
- Referee: Brad Rogers
- TV announcers (Fox): Adam Amin, Mark Sanchez and Kristina Pink
- Recap, Game Book

Game information

**First quarter**

- LAR – Joshua Karty 46-yard field goal, 4:01. Rams 3–0. **Drive: 13 plays, 68 yards, 7:23.**

**Second quarter**

- LAR – Joshua Karty 37-yard field goal, 13:05. Rams 6–0. **Drive: 8 plays, 56 yards, 3:51.**
- CHI – Roschon Johnson 1-yard run (Cairo Santos kick), 5:42. Bears 7–6. **Drive: 3 plays, 16 yards, 1:00.**
- CHI – Cairo Santos 40-yard field goal, 0:09. Bears 10–6. **Drive: 8 plays, 45 yards, 0:52.**

**Third quarter**

- LAR – Joshua Karty 25-yard field goal, 8:50. Bears 10–9. **Drive: 12 plays, 63 yards, 6:10.**
- CHI – D. J. Moore 9-yard pass from Caleb Williams (Cairo Santos kick), 2:43. Bears 17–9. **Drive: 12 plays, 74 yards, 6:13.**

**Fourth quarter**

- LAR – Kyren Williams 3-yard run (pass failed), 14:55. Bears 17–15. **Drive: 6 plays, 70 yards, 2:42.**
- CHI – D'Andre Swift 36-yard run (Cairo Santos kick), 12:26. Bears 24–15. **Drive: 5 plays, 70 yards, 2:29.**
- LAR – Joshua Karty 52-yard field goal, 8:47. Bears 24–18. **Drive: 7 plays, 36 yards, 3:39.**

**Top passers**

- LAR – Matthew Stafford – 20/29, 224 yards, INT
- CHI – Caleb Williams – 17/23, 157 yards, TD

**Top rushers**

- LAR – Kyren Williams – 19 rushes, 94 yards, TD
- CHI – D'Andre Swift – 16 rushes, 93 yards, TD

**Top receivers**

- LAR – Tutu Atwell – 4 receptions, 82 yards
- CHI – D'Andre Swift – 7 receptions, 72 yards

D'Andre Swift rushed for 93 yards and a touchdown, and the Bears defense forced two turnovers, improving them to 2–2 and their first win over the Rams since 2018.

==== Week 5: vs. Carolina Panthers ====
Week 5: Carolina Panthers at Chicago Bears – Game summary

Quarter	1	2	3	4	Total
Panthers	7	0	3	0	**10**
**Bears**	7	20	3	6	**36**

at Soldier Field, Chicago, Illinois

- Date: October 6
- Game time: 12:00 p.m. CDT
- Game weather: Sunny, 74 °F (23 °C)
- Game attendance: 59,307
- Referee: Tra Blake
- TV announcers (Fox): Kenny Albert, Jonathan Vilma and Megan Olivi
- Recap, Game Book

Game information

**First quarter**

- CAR – Chuba Hubbard 38-yard run (Eddy Piñeiro kick), 8:54. Panthers 7–0. **Drive: 5 plays, 51 yards, 2:45.**
- CHI – D. J. Moore 34-yard pass from Caleb Williams (Cairo Santos kick), 5:44. Tied 7–7. **Drive: 7 plays, 70 yards, 3:10.**

**Second quarter**

- CHI – Roschon Johnson 1-yard run (Cairo Santos kick), 10:44. Bears 14–7. **Drive: 13 plays, 80 yards, 6:27.**
- CHI – D'Andre Swift 1-yard run (Cairo Santos kick), 2:14. Bears 21–7. **Drive: 3 plays, 44 yards, 0:35.**
- CHI – D. J. Moore 30-yard pass from Caleb Williams (kick failed, wide right), 0:24. Bears 27–7. **Drive: 5 plays, 62 yards, 0:31.**

**Third quarter**

- CHI – Cairo Santos 33-yard field goal, 6:25. Bears 30–7. **Drive: 11 plays, 51 yards, 4:37.**
- CAR – Eddy Piñeiro 27-yard field goal, 2:10. Bears 30–10. **Drive: 10 plays, 61 yards, 4:15.**

**Fourth quarter**

- CHI – Roschon Johnson 1-yard run (pass failed), 4:23. Bears 36–10. **Drive: 5 plays, 18 yards, 3:07.**

**Top passers**

- CAR – Andy Dalton – 18/28, 136 yards, INT
- CHI – Caleb Williams – 20/29, 304 yards, 2 TD

**Top rushers**

- CAR – Chuba Hubbard – 13 rushes, 97 yards, TD
- CHI – D'Andre Swift – 21 rushes, 73 yards, TD

**Top receivers**

- CAR – Jalen Coker – 4 receptions, 68 yards
- CHI – D. J. Moore – 5 receptions, 105 yards, 2 TD

The Bears played lights out football. Caleb Williams played his best game with the Bears with 304 passing yards and two touchdowns, and Chicago's defense allowed just 10 points and forced three turnovers. With the win, they improve to 3–2 and defeated the Panthers for the fourth straight meeting.

==== Week 6: vs. Jacksonville Jaguars ====
NFL London games

Week 6: Jacksonville Jaguars at Chicago Bears – Game summary

Quarter	1	2	3	4	Total
Jaguars	3	0	7	6	**16**
**Bears**	0	14	7	14	**35**

at Tottenham Hotspur Stadium, London, England

- Date: October 13
- Game time: 2:30 p.m. BST/8:30 a.m. CDT
- Game weather: Partly cloudy, 54 °F (12 °C)
- Game attendance: 61,182
- Referee: Brad Allen
- TV announcers (WFLD/NFLN): Rich Eisen, Kurt Warner, Stacey Dales and Steve Wyche
  Game exclusive to WFLD through syndication. Out of market on the NFL Network.
- Recap, Game Book

Game information

**First quarter**

- JAX – Cam Little 30-yard field goal, 4:37. Jaguars 3–0. **Drive: 14 plays, 67 yards, 8:12.**

**Second quarter**

- CHI – Cole Kmet 31-yard pass from Caleb Williams (Cairo Santos kick), 11:07. Bears 7–3. **Drive: 7 plays, 81 yards, 3:46.**
- CHI – Cole Kmet 2-yard pass from Caleb Williams (Cairo Santos kick), 0:13. Bears 14–3. **Drive: 10 plays, 85 yards, 2:55.**

**Third quarter**

- CHI – Keenan Allen 9-yard pass from Caleb Williams (Cairo Santos kick), 11:22. Bears 21–3. **Drive: 7 plays, 41 yards, 3:18.**
- JAX – Gabe Davis 21-yard pass from Trevor Lawrence (Cam Little kick), 6:02. Bears 21–10. **Drive: 11 plays, 70 yards, 5:20.**

**Fourth quarter**

- CHI – Keenan Allen 3-yard pass from Caleb Williams (Cairo Santos kick), 14:56. Bears 28–10. **Drive: 10 plays, 70 yards, 6:06.**
- CHI – D'Andre Swift 1-yard run (Cairo Santos kick), 12:29. Bears 35–10. **Drive: 3 plays, 36 yards, 1:06.**
- JAX – Gabe Davis 5-yard pass from Trevor Lawrence (pass failed), 6:58. Bears 35–16. **Drive: 17 plays, 70 yards, 5:31.**

**Top passers**

- JAX – Trevor Lawrence – 23/35, 234 yards, 2 TD, INT
- CHI – Caleb Williams – 23/29, 226 yards, 4 TD, INT

**Top rushers**

- JAX – D'Ernest Johnson – 6 rushes, 28 yards
- CHI – D'Andre Swift – 17 rushes, 91 yards, TD

**Top receivers**

- JAX – Evan Engram – 10 receptions, 102 yards
- CHI – Cole Kmet – 5 receptions, 70 yards, 2 TD

The Bears scored 35+ points in consecutive games for the first time since 2013, blowing out the Jaguars 35–16 and improving to 4–2.

==== Week 8: at Washington Commanders ====
Week 8: Chicago Bears at Washington Commanders – Game summary

Quarter	1	2	3	4	Total
Bears	0	0	7	8	**15**
**Commanders**	6	3	3	6	**18**

at Northwest Stadium, Landover, Maryland

- Date: October 27
- Game time: 4:25 p.m. EDT/3:25 p.m. CDT
- Game weather: Sunny, 58 °F (14 °C)
- Game attendance: 64,704
- Referee: Clete Blakeman
- TV announcers (CBS): Jim Nantz, Tony Romo and Tracy Wolfson
- Recap, Game Book

Game information

**First quarter**

- WAS – Austin Seibert 27-yard field goal, 8:51. Commanders 3–0. **Drive: 9 plays, 56 yards, 4:12.**
- WAS – Austin Seibert 30-yard field goal, 1:04. Commanders 6–0. **Drive: 12 plays, 79 yards, 4:59.**

**Second quarter**

- WAS – Austin Seibert 28-yard field goal, 5:24. Commanders 9–0. **Drive: 7 plays, 31 yards, 3:01.**

**Third quarter**

- WAS – Austin Seibert 47-yard field goal, 5:48. Commanders 12–0. **Drive: 7 plays, 12 yards, 3:50.**
- CHI – D'Andre Swift 56-yard run (Cairo Santos kick), 0:43. Commanders 12–7. **Drive: 2 plays, 59 yards, 0:46.**

**Fourth quarter**

- CHI – Roschon Johnson 1-yard run (Caleb Williams–Cole Kmet pass), 0:23. Bears 15–12. **Drive: 10 plays, 62 yards, 3:56.**
- WAS – Noah Brown 52-yard pass from Jayden Daniels, 0:00. Commanders 18–15. **Drive: 4 plays, 76 yards, 0:25.**

**Top passers**

- CHI – Caleb Williams – 10/24, 131 yards
- WAS – Jayden Daniels – 21/38, 326 yards, TD

**Top rushers**

- CHI – D'Andre Swift – 18 rushes, 129 yards, TD
- WAS – Brian Robinson Jr. – 16 rushes, 65 yards

**Top receivers**

- CHI – Rome Odunze – 3 receptions, 41 yards
- WAS – Terry McLaurin – 5 receptions, 125 yards

The last play of the game was a 52-yard Hail Mary pass from Commanders rookie quarterback Jayden Daniels to wide receiver Noah Brown to defeat the Bears. As the play developed, Bears cornerback Tyrique Stevenson was away from his coverage, taunting the crowd and was late to recover. He inadvertently tipped the pass to Brown for the winning touchdown. With the loss, the Bears fell to 4–3.

==== Week 9: at Arizona Cardinals ====
Week 9: Chicago Bears at Arizona Cardinals – Game summary

Quarter	1	2	3	4	Total
Bears	0	9	0	0	**9**
**Cardinals**	7	14	3	5	**29**

at State Farm Stadium, Glendale, Arizona

- Date: November 3
- Game time: 3:05 p.m. CST/2:05 p.m. MST
- Game weather: Sunny, 71 °F (22 °C) (retractable roof open)
- Game attendance: 64,609
- Referee: Carl Cheffers
- TV announcers (CBS): Ian Eagle, Charles Davis and Evan Washburn
- Recap, Game Book

Game information

**First quarter**

- ARI – Trey McBride 2-yard run (Chad Ryland kick), 0:46. Cardinals 7–0. **Drive: 5 plays, 41 yards, 2:37.**

**Second quarter**

- CHI – Cairo Santos 29-yard field goal, 11:51. Cardinals 7–3. **Drive: 11 plays, 69 yards, 3:55.**
- CHI – Cairo Santos 53-yard field goal, 9:10. Cardinals 7–6. **Drive: 6 plays, 11 yards, 1:52.**
- ARI – Trey Benson 1-yard run (Chad Ryland kick), 3:14. Cardinals 14–6. **Drive: 12 plays, 70 yards, 5:56.**
- CHI – Cairo Santos 53-yard field goal, 0:26. Cardinals 14–9. **Drive: 10 plays, 35 yards, 2:48.**
- ARI – Emari Demercado 53-yard run (Chad Ryland kick), 0:04. Cardinals 21–9. **Drive: 4 plays, 70 yards, 0:22.**

**Third quarter**

- ARI – Chad Ryland 29-yard field goal, 4:53. Cardinals 24–9. **Drive: 13 plays, 69 yards, 7:54.**

**Fourth quarter**

- ARI – Chad Ryland 55-yard field goal, 14:02. Cardinals 27–9. **Drive: 4 plays, 3 yards, 0:53.**
- ARI – Penalty on D'Andre Swift enforced in the end zone for a safety, 7:58. Cardinals 29–9.

**Top passers**

- CHI – Caleb Williams – 22/41, 216 yards
- ARI – Kyler Murray – 13/20, 154 yards

**Top rushers**

- CHI – D'Andre Swift – 16 rushes, 51 yards
- ARI – James Conner – 18 rushes, 107 yards

**Top receivers**

- CHI – Rome Odunze – 5 receptions, 104 yards
- ARI – Trey McBride – 3 receptions, 35 yards

The Bears kicked 3 field goals, failed to score a touchdown, and were defeated in lopsided fashion by the Cardinals, and fell to 4–4.

==== Week 10: vs. New England Patriots ====
Week 10: New England Patriots at Chicago Bears – Game summary

Quarter	1	2	3	4	Total
**Patriots**	3	10	0	6	**19**
Bears	0	3	0	0	**3**

at Soldier Field, Chicago, Illinois

- Date: November 10
- Game time: 12:00 p.m. CST
- Game weather: Mostly cloudy, 60 °F (16 °C)
- Game attendance: 58,912
- Referee: Land Clark
- TV announcers (Fox): Kevin Kugler, Daryl Johnston and Laura Okmin
- Recap, Game Book

Game information

**First quarter**

- NE – Joey Slye 30-yard field goal, 6:19. Patriots 3–0. **Drive: 11 plays, 54 yards, 5:26.**

**Second quarter**

- CHI – Cairo Santos 33-yard field goal, 7:17. Tied 3–3. **Drive: 12 plays, 50 yards, 4:41.**
- NE – Ja'Lynn Polk 2-yard pass from Drake Maye (Joey Slye kick), 1:46. Patriots 10–3. **Drive: 10 plays, 70 yards, 5:31.**
- NE – Joey Slye 37-yard field goal, 0:00. Patriots 13–3. **Drive: 5 plays, 41 yards, 0:35.**

**Third quarter**

- No scoring plays.

**Fourth quarter**

- NE – Joey Slye 25-yard field goal, 7:30. Patriots 16–3. **Drive: 10 plays, 47 yards, 6:03.**
- NE – Joey Slye 33-yard field goal, 2:17. Patriots 19–3. **Drive: 7 plays, 31 yards, 2:37.**

**Top passers**

- NE – Drake Maye – 15/25, 184 yards, TD, INT
- CHI – Caleb Williams – 16/30, 120 yards

**Top rushers**

- NE – Rhamondre Stevenson – 20 rushes, 74 yards
- CHI – D'Andre Swift – 16 rushes, 59 yards

**Top receivers**

- NE – Austin Hooper – 3 receptions, 64 yards
- CHI – Keenan Allen – 5 receptions, 44 yards

For the second straight game, the Bears failed to score a touchdown, and fell to 4–5. This was also the Bears' first loss at Soldier Field since Week 6 of 2023, snapping an 8-game winning streak at home.

After this game, the Bears fired offensive coordinator Shane Waldron and named Thomas Brown interim offensive coordinator.

==== Week 11: vs. Green Bay Packers ====
Week 11: Green Bay Packers at Chicago Bears – Game summary

Quarter	1	2	3	4	Total
**Packers**	7	0	7	6	**20**
Bears	3	7	9	0	**19**

at Soldier Field, Chicago, Illinois

- Date: November 17
- Game time: 12:00 p.m. CST
- Game weather: Mostly cloudy, 54 °F (12 °C)
- Game attendance: 59,419
- Referee: Bill Vinovich
- TV announcers (Fox): Kevin Burkhardt, Tom Brady, Erin Andrews and Tom Rinaldi
- Recap, Game Book

Game information

**First quarter**

- GB – Jayden Reed 15-yard pass from Jordan Love (Brandon McManus kick), 11:15. Packers 7–0. **Drive: 8 plays, 70 yards, 3:45.**
- CHI – Cairo Santos 53-yard field goal, 7:49. Packers 7–3. **Drive: 8 plays, 34 yards, 3:26.**

**Second quarter**

- CHI – Roschon Johnson 1-yard run (Cairo Santos kick), 0:07. Bears 10–7. **Drive: 13 plays, 76 yards, 5:42.**

**Third quarter**

- CHI – Cairo Santos 27-yard field goal, 10:07. Bears 13–7. **Drive: 10 plays, 61 yards, 4:43.**
- GB – Josh Jacobs 7-yard run (Brandon McManus kick), 6:34. Packers 14–13. **Drive: 6 plays, 70 yards, 3:43.**
- CHI – D'Andre Swift 39-yard run (pass failed), 0:31. Bears 19–14. **Drive: 11 plays, 78 yards, 6:03.**

**Fourth quarter**

- GB – Jordan Love 1-yard run (run failed), 2:59. Packers 20–19. **Drive: 4 plays, 78 yards, 1:18.**

**Top passers**

- GB – Jordan Love – 13/17, 261 yards, TD, INT
- CHI – Caleb Williams – 23/31, 231 yards

**Top rushers**

- GB – Josh Jacobs – 18 rushes, 76 yards, TD
- CHI – D'Andre Swift – 14 rushes, 71 yards, TD

**Top receivers**

- GB – Christian Watson – 4 receptions, 150 yards
- CHI – Rome Odunze – 6 receptions, 65 yards

The Bears suffered another last-second loss, after a 46-yard field goal attempt from Cairo Santos to win the game was deflected by Packers defensive lineman Karl Brooks. The Bears fell to 4–6 and lost their eleventh straight game against the Packers.

==== Week 12: vs. Minnesota Vikings ====
Week 12: Minnesota Vikings at Chicago Bears – Game summary

Quarter	1	2	3	4	OT	Total
**Vikings**	0	14	10	3	3	**30**
Bears	7	3	0	17	0	**27**

at Soldier Field, Chicago, Illinois

- Date: November 24
- Game time: 12:00 p.m. CST
- Game weather: Partly sunny, 47 °F (8 °C)
- Game attendance: 57,659
- Referee: Clay Martin
- TV announcers (Fox): Kevin Kugler, Daryl Johnston and Laura Okmin
- Recap, Game Book

Game information

**First quarter**

- CHI – Roschon Johnson 1-yard run (Cairo Santos kick), 0:53. Bears 7–0. **Drive: 7 plays, 79 yards, 4:17.**

**Second quarter**

- MIN – Jordan Addison 2-yard pass from Sam Darnold (John Parker Romo kick), 14:54. Tied 7–7. **Drive: 3 plays, 67 yards, 0:59.**
- MIN – Jalen Nailor 5-yard pass from Sam Darnold (John Parker Romo kick), 6:29. Vikings 14–7. **Drive: 6 plays, 53 yards, 2:57.**
- CHI – Cairo Santos 49-yard field goal, 0:00. Vikings 14–10. **Drive: 10 plays, 49 yards, 3:09.**

**Third quarter**

- MIN – John Parker Romo 40-yard field goal, 12:40. Vikings 17–10. **Drive: 5 plays, 55 yards, 2:20.**
- MIN – Aaron Jones 2-yard run (John Parker Romo kick), 1:22. Vikings 24–10. **Drive: 5 plays, 15 yards, 2:47.**

**Fourth quarter**

- CHI – D. J. Moore 10-yard pass from Caleb Williams (pass failed), 7:22. Vikings 24–16. **Drive: 10 plays, 64 yards, 4:45.**
- MIN – John Parker Romo 26-yard field goal, 1:56. Vikings 27–16. **Drive: 11 plays, 63 yards, 5:26.**
- CHI – Keenan Allen 1-yard pass from Caleb Williams (Caleb Williams–D. J. Moore pass), 0:22. Vikings 27–24. **Drive: 8 plays, 40 yards, 1:34.**
- CHI – Cairo Santos 48-yard field goal, 0:00. Tied 27–27. **Drive: 3 plays, 27 yards, 0:22.**

**Overtime**

- MIN – John Parker Romo 29-yard field goal, 2:10. Vikings 30–27. **Drive: 10 plays, 68 yards, 5:29.**

**Top passers**

- MIN – Sam Darnold – 22/34, 330 yards, 2 TD
- CHI – Caleb Williams – 32/47, 340 yards, 2 TD

**Top rushers**

- MIN – Aaron Jones – 22 rushes, 106 yards, TD
- CHI – Caleb Williams – 6 rushes, 33 yards

**Top receivers**

- MIN – Jordan Addison – 8 receptions, 162 yards, TD
- CHI – D. J. Moore – 7 receptions, 106 yards, TD

The Bears rallied from an 11-point deficit with under 2 minutes remaining to force overtime, but the Bears offense went three-and-out and the Vikings drove down the field for a game-winning field goal. With the loss, the Bears fell to 4–7.

==== Week 13: at Detroit Lions ====
Thanksgiving Day games

Week 13: Chicago Bears at Detroit Lions – Game summary

Quarter	1	2	3	4	Total
Bears	0	0	7	13	**20**
**Lions**	3	13	7	0	**23**

at Ford Field, Detroit, Michigan

- Date: November 28
- Game time: 12:30 p.m. EST/11:30 a.m. CST
- Game weather: None (indoor stadium)
- Game attendance: 64,275
- Referee: Alan Eck
- TV announcers (CBS): Jim Nantz, Tony Romo and Tracy Wolfson
- Recap, Game Book

Game information

**First quarter**

- DET – Jake Bates 30-yard field goal, 7:06. Lions 3–0. **Drive: 15 plays, 58 yards, 7:54.**

**Second quarter**

- DET – Sam LaPorta 3-yard pass from Jared Goff (Jake Bates kick), 14:55. Lions 10–0. **Drive: 10 plays, 90 yards, 5:33.**
- DET – Jake Bates 36-yard field goal, 7:15. Lions 13–0. **Drive: 11 plays, 56 yards, 5:26.**
- DET – Jake Bates 48-yard field goal, 3:11. Lions 16–0. **Drive: 9 plays, 39 yards, 3:02.**

**Third quarter**

- CHI – Keenan Allen 31-yard pass from Caleb Williams (Cairo Santos kick), 9:47. Lions 16–7. **Drive: 9 plays, 74 yards, 5:13.**
- DET – Sam LaPorta 1-yard pass from Jared Goff (Jake Bates kick), 2:43. Lions 23–7. **Drive: 11 plays, 78 yards, 7:04.**

**Fourth quarter**

- CHI – Keenan Allen 9-yard pass from Caleb Williams (pass failed), 13:40. Lions 23–13. **Drive: 8 plays, 70 yards, 4:03.**
- CHI – D. J. Moore 31-yard pass from Caleb Williams (Cairo Santos kick), 5:36. Lions 23–20. **Drive: 8 plays, 65 yards, 3:06.**

**Top passers**

- CHI – Caleb Williams – 20/39, 256 yards, 3 TD
- DET – Jared Goff – 21/34, 221 yards, 2 TD

**Top rushers**

- CHI – D'Andre Swift – 11 rushes, 39 yards
- DET – David Montgomery – 21 rushes, 88 yards

**Top receivers**

- CHI – D. J. Moore – 8 receptions, 97 yards, 2 TD
- DET – Amon-Ra St. Brown – 5 receptions, 73 yards

The Bears rallied from a 23–7 fourth quarter deficit to pull within 23–20 with possession of the ball in field goal range; however, a sack knocked them out of field goal range, and a disastrous sequence ensued with the Bears not using their last timeout and the clock running out after an incomplete pass. The loss dropped the Bears to 4–8, and the day after the game, head coach Matt Eberflus was fired, becoming the first head coach in franchise history to be fired mid-season, and interim offensive coordinator Thomas Brown was promoted to interim head coach.

==== Week 14: at San Francisco 49ers ====
Week 14: Chicago Bears at San Francisco 49ers – Game summary

Quarter	1	2	3	4	Total
Bears	0	0	6	7	**13**
**49ers**	14	10	0	14	**38**

at Levi's Stadium, Santa Clara, California

- Date: December 8
- Game time: 3:25 p.m. CST/1:25 p.m. PST
- Game weather: Cloudy, 65 °F (18 °C)
- Game attendance: 71,662
- Referee: Ronald Torbert
- TV announcers (Fox): Kenny Albert, Jonathan Vilma and Megan Olivi
- Recap, Game Book

Game information

**First quarter**

- SF – Jauan Jennings 7-yard pass from Brock Purdy (Jake Moody kick), 12:20. 49ers 7–0. **Drive: 5 plays, 70 yards, 2:40.**
- SF – Isaac Guerendo 1-yard run (Jake Moody kick), 1:39. 49ers 14–0. **Drive: 4 plays, 64 yards, 2:11.**

**Second quarter**

- SF – Jauan Jennings 16-yard pass from Brock Purdy (Jake Moody kick), 7:41. 49ers 21–0. **Drive: 12 plays, 71 yards, 7:24.**
- SF – Jake Moody 23-yard field goal, 1:50. 49ers 24–0. **Drive: 9 plays, 69 yards, 3:44.**

**Third quarter**

- CHI – Rome Odunze 4-yard pass from Caleb Williams (pass failed), 5:56. 49ers 24–6. **Drive: 16 plays, 70 yards, 9:04.**

**Fourth quarter**

- SF – Isaac Guerendo 4-yard run (Jake Moody kick), 14:57. 49ers 31–6. **Drive: 5 plays, 62 yards, 2:43.**
- CHI – Rome Odunze 14-yard pass from Caleb Williams (Cairo Santos kick), 11:48. 49ers 31–13. **Drive: 6 plays, 60 yards, 3:09.**
- SF – Patrick Taylor Jr. 3-yard run (Jake Moody kick), 5:15. 49ers 38–13. **Drive: 13 plays, 70 yards, 6:33.**

**Top passers**

- CHI – Caleb Williams – 17/23, 134 yards, 2 TD
- SF – Brock Purdy – 20/25, 325 yards, 2 TD

**Top rushers**

- CHI – D'Andre Swift – 14 rushes, 38 yards
- SF – Isaac Guerendo – 15 rushes, 78 yards, 2 TD

**Top receivers**

- CHI – D. J. Moore – 6 receptions, 49 yards
- SF – George Kittle – 6 receptions, 151 yards

Thomas Brown's head coaching debut was a disaster for the Bears, who were outgained in yardage 319–4 in the first half and 452–162 for the game against a shorthanded 49ers team. With their seventh straight loss, the Bears fell to 4–9 and were assured of a fourth straight losing season.

==== Week 15: at Minnesota Vikings ====
Week 15: Chicago Bears at Minnesota Vikings – Game summary

Quarter	1	2	3	4	Total
Bears	0	0	3	9	**12**
**Vikings**	10	3	7	10	**30**

at U.S. Bank Stadium, Minneapolis, Minnesota

- Date: December 16
- Game time: 7:15 p.m. CST
- Game weather: None (indoor stadium)
- Game attendance: 67,017
- Referee: John Hussey
- TV announcers (ABC): Joe Buck, Troy Aikman and Lisa Salters
- Recap, Game Book

Game information

**First quarter**

- MIN – Will Reichard 52-yard field goal, 12:04. Vikings 3–0. **Drive: 4 plays, 5 yards, 0:53.**
- MIN – Justin Jefferson 7-yard pass from Sam Darnold (Will Reichard kick), 5:04. Vikings 10–0. **Drive: 5 plays, 39 yards, 2:30.**

**Second quarter**

- MIN – Will Reichard 31-yard field goal, 0:04. Vikings 13–0. **Drive: 13 plays, 58 yards, 2:31.**

**Third quarter**

- CHI – Cairo Santos 29-yard field goal, 7:02. Vikings 13–3. **Drive: 9 plays, 47 yards, 3:38.**
- MIN – Aaron Jones 1-yard run (Will Reichard kick), 1:38. Vikings 20–3. **Drive: 12 plays, 70 yards, 5:24.**

**Fourth quarter**

- CHI – Cairo Santos 39-yard field goal, 13:00. Vikings 20–6. **Drive: 10 plays, 49 yards, 3:38.**
- MIN – Cam Akers 1-yard run (Will Reichard kick), 10:14. Vikings 27–6. **Drive: 7 plays, 70 yards, 2:46.**
- CHI – Keenan Allen 16-yard pass from Caleb Williams (pass failed), 5:19. Vikings 27–12. **Drive: 6 plays, 27 yards, 0:54.**
- MIN – Will Reichard 46-yard field goal, 1:12. Vikings 30–12. **Drive: 7 plays, 14 yards, 4:07.**

**Top passers**

- CHI – Caleb Williams – 18/31, 191 yards, TD
- MIN – Sam Darnold – 24/40, 231 yards, TD, INT

**Top rushers**

- CHI – D'Andre Swift – 19 rushes, 79 yards
- MIN – Aaron Jones – 18 rushes, 86 yards, TD

**Top receivers**

- CHI – Keenan Allen – 6 receptions, 82 yards, TD
- MIN – Justin Jefferson – 7 receptions, 73 yards, TD

The Bears were shut out in the first half for the third consecutive game, and were blown out 30–12 by the Vikings, falling to 4–10. Also, prior to this game playing out, the Bears were eliminated from the playoffs due to Washington's win over New Orleans.

==== Week 16: vs. Detroit Lions ====
Week 16: Detroit Lions at Chicago Bears – Game summary

Quarter	1	2	3	4	Total
**Lions**	13	14	7	0	**34**
Bears	0	14	3	0	**17**

at Soldier Field, Chicago, Illinois

- Date: December 22
- Game time: 12:00 p.m. CST
- Game weather: Mostly cloudy, 29 °F (−2 °C)
- Game attendance: 56,539
- Referee: Clete Blakeman
- TV announcers (Fox): Kenny Albert, Jonathan Vilma and Megan Olivi
- Recap, Game Book

Game information

**First quarter**

- DET – Jake Bates 30-yard field goal, 9:35. Lions 3–0. **Drive: 9 plays, 55 yards, 4:14.**
- DET – Jahmyr Gibbs 1-yard run (Jake Bates kick), 5:34. Lions 10–0. **Drive: 7 plays, 36 yards, 2:53.**
- DET – Jake Bates 34-yard field goal, 0:02. Lions 13–0. **Drive: 7 plays, 44 yards, 3:26.**

**Second quarter**

- DET – Jameson Williams 82-yard pass from Jared Goff (Jake Bates kick), 12:49. Lions 20–0. **Drive: 2 plays, 93 yards, 0:43.**
- CHI – Cole Kmet 1-yard pass from Caleb Williams (Cairo Santos kick), 6:31. Lions 20–7. **Drive: 14 plays, 70 yards, 6:16.**
- DET – Amon-Ra St. Brown 8-yard pass from Jared Goff (Jake Bates kick), 0:58. Lions 27–7. **Drive: 11 plays, 70 yards, 5:33.**
- CHI – Keenan Allen 45-yard pass from Caleb Williams (Cairo Santos kick), 0:39. Lions 27–14. **Drive: 3 plays, 70 yards, 0:19.**

**Third quarter**

- DET – Sam LaPorta 21-yard pass from Jared Goff (Jake Bates kick), 12:18. Lions 34–14. **Drive: 5 plays, 79 yards, 2:42.**
- CHI – Cairo Santos 30-yard field goal, 6:03. Lions 34–17. **Drive: 10 plays, 58 yards, 6:15.**

**Fourth quarter**

- No scoring plays.

**Top passers**

- DET – Jared Goff – 23/32, 336 yards, 3 TD
- CHI – Caleb Williams – 26/40, 332 yards, 2 TD

**Top rushers**

- DET – Jahmyr Gibbs – 23 rushes, 109 yards, TD
- CHI – Caleb Williams – 6 rushes, 34 yards

**Top receivers**

- DET – Jameson Williams – 5 receptions, 143 yards, TD
- CHI – Keenan Allen – 9 receptions, 140 yards, TD

With another lopsided loss, the Bears fell to 4–11.

==== Week 17: vs. Seattle Seahawks ====
Week 17: Seattle Seahawks at Chicago Bears – Game summary

Quarter	1	2	3	4	Total
**Seahawks**	3	3	0	0	**6**
Bears	0	3	0	0	**3**

at Soldier Field, Chicago, Illinois

- Date: December 26
- Game time: 7:15 p.m. CST
- Game weather: Mostly cloudy, 47 °F (8 °C)
- Game attendance: 56,346
- Referee: Scott Novak
- TV announcers (WFLD/Prime Video): Al Michaels, Kirk Herbstreit and Kaylee Hartung
  Game exclusive to WFLD through syndication. Out of market on Prime Video.
- Recap, Game Book

Game information

**First quarter**

- SEA – Jason Myers 27-yard field goal, 8:59. Seahawks 3–0. **Drive: 11 plays, 71 yards, 6:01.**

**Second quarter**

- CHI – Cairo Santos 42-yard field goal, 2:32. Tied 3–3. **Drive: 13 plays, 67 yards, 7:47.**
- SEA – Jason Myers 50-yard field goal, 0:21. Seahawks 6–3. **Drive: 8 plays, 38 yards, 2:11.**

**Third quarter**

- No scoring plays.

**Fourth quarter**

- No scoring plays.

**Top passers**

- SEA – Geno Smith – 17/23, 160 yards
- CHI – Caleb Williams – 16/28, 122 yards, INT

**Top rushers**

- SEA – Zach Charbonnet – 15 rushes, 57 yards
- CHI – D'Andre Swift – 12 rushes, 53 yards

**Top receivers**

- SEA – Noah Fant – 4 receptions, 43 yards
- CHI – D. J. Moore – 6 receptions, 54 yards

For the third time this season, the Bears failed to score a touchdown, and failed to score an offensive touchdown for the fourth time on the season.

With the loss, the Bears tied their franchise-worst 10-game losing streak (with the 2022 season).

==== Week 18: at Green Bay Packers ====
Week 18: Chicago Bears at Green Bay Packers – Game summary

Quarter	1	2	3	4	Total
**Bears**	7	7	0	10	**24**
Packers	3	10	0	9	**22**

at Lambeau Field, Green Bay, Wisconsin

- Date: January 5
- Game time: 12:00 p.m. CST
- Game weather: Cloudy, 16 °F (−9 °C)
- Game attendance: 77,862
- Referee: Clay Martin
- TV announcers (Fox): Kevin Kugler, Daryl Johnston and Laura Okmin
- Recap, Game Book

Game information

**First quarter**

- CHI – Josh Blackwell 94-yard punt return for a touchdown (Cairo Santos kick), 6:34. Bears 7–0.
- GB – Brandon McManus 37-yard field goal, 2:24. Bears 7–3. **Drive: 8 plays, 52 yards, 4:10.**

**Second quarter**

- CHI – D'Andre Swift 4-yard run (Cairo Santos kick), 14:17. Bears 14–3. **Drive: 3 plays, 21 yards, 0:45.**
- GB – Josh Jacobs 9-yard run (Brandon McManus kick), 11:12. Bears 14–10. **Drive: 7 plays, 63 yards, 3:05.**
- GB – Brandon McManus 30-yard field goal, 1:57. Bears 14–13. **Drive: 11 plays, 68 yards, 5:28.**

**Third quarter**

- No scoring plays

**Fourth quarter**

- CHI – D. J. Moore 32-yard pass from Caleb Williams (Cairo Santos kick), 10:02. Bears 21–13. **Drive: 8 plays, 61 yards, 4:53.**
- GB – Emanuel Wilson (pass failed), 4:28. Bears 21–19. **Drive: 4 plays, 51 yards, 1:30.**
- GB – Brandon McManus 55-yard field goal, 0:54. Packers 22–21. **Drive: 4 plays, 6 yards, 0:55.**
- CHI – Cairo Santos 51-yard field goal, 0:00. Bears 24–22. **Drive: 6 plays, 47 yards, 0:54.**

**Top passers**

- CHI – Caleb Williams – 21/29, 148 yards, TD
- GB – Malik Willis – 10/13, 136 yards

**Top rushers**

- CHI – D'Andre Swift – 20 rushes, 65 yards, TD
- GB – Emanuel Wilson – 14 rushes, 73 yards, TD

**Top receivers**

- CHI – D. J. Moore – 9 receptions, 86 yards, TD
- GB – Malik Heath – 3 receptions, 53 yards

With the last second game-winning field goal the Bears snap both their 10 game losing streak and their 11 game losing streak against Green Bay to finish 5–12. This was also the Bears' only road win of the season, their first road win on a Sunday since 2021, and their first win in Green Bay since 2015.

=== Standings ===
==== Division ====
NFC North
	W	L	T	PCT	DIV	CONF	PF	PA	STK
^{(1)} Detroit Lions	15	2	0	.882	6–0	11–1	564	342	W3
^{(5)} Minnesota Vikings	14	3	0	.824	4–2	9–3	432	332	L1
^{(7)} Green Bay Packers	11	6	0	.647	1–5	6–6	460	338	L2
Chicago Bears	5	12	0	.294	1–5	3–9	310	370	W1

Teams highlighted in green made the playoffs, and their seedings are shown.

==== Conference ====
NFC
Seed	Team	Division	W	L	T	PCT	DIV	CONF	SOS	SOV	STK
**Division leaders**
1	Detroit Lions	North	15	2	0	.882	6–0	11–1	.516	.494	W3
2	Philadelphia Eagles	East	14	3	0	.824	5–1	9–3	.453	.424	W2
3 (Note: Tampa Bay clinched the #3 seed over Los Angeles based on conference record. (Tampa Bay 8–4 to Los Angeles 6–6))	Tampa Bay Buccaneers	South	10	7	0	.588	4–2	8–4	.502	.465	W2
4 (Note: Los Angeles clinched the NFC West and #4 seed over Seattle based on strength of victory. (Los Angeles .441 to Seattle .424))	Los Angeles Rams	West	10	7	0	.588	4–2	6–6	.505	.441	L1
**Wild cards**
5	Minnesota Vikings	North	14	3	0	.824	4–2	9–3	.474	.408	L1
6	Washington Commanders	East	12	5	0	.706	4–2	9–3	.436	.358	W5
7	Green Bay Packers	North	11	6	0	.647	1–5	6–6	.533	.412	L2
**Did not qualify for the postseason**
8	Seattle Seahawks	West	10	7	0	.588	4–2	6–6	.498	.424	W2
9 (Note: Atlanta finished ahead of Arizona based on conference record. (Atlanta 7–5 to Arizona 4–8))	Atlanta Falcons	South	8	9	0	.471	4–2	7–5	.519	.426	L2
10	Arizona Cardinals	West	8	9	0	.471	3–3	4–8	.536	.404	W1
11	Dallas Cowboys	East	7	10	0	.412	3–3	5–7	.522	.387	L2
12	San Francisco 49ers	West	6	11	0	.353	1–5	4–8	.564	.402	L4
13 (Note: Chicago finished ahead of Carolina based on head-to-head victory.)	Chicago Bears	North	5	12	0	.294	1–5	3–9	.554	.388	W1
14 (Note: Carolina finished ahead of New Orleans based on strength of victory. (Carolina .329 to New Orleans .306))	Carolina Panthers	South	5	12	0	.294	2–4	4–8	.498	.329	W1
15	New Orleans Saints	South	5	12	0	.294	2–4	4–8	.505	.306	L4
16	New York Giants	East	3	14	0	.176	0–6	1–11	.554	.412	L1
**Tiebreakers** (Note: When breaking ties for three or more teams under the NFL's rules, they are first broken within divisions, then comparing only the highest ranked remaining team from each division.)
