= Brown Bears men's squash =

Men's college squash team

- University: Brown University
- First season: 1989-90
- Head coach: Stuart LeGassick (31st season)
- League: College Squash Association
- Conference: Ivy League
- Location: Providence, Rhode Island
- Venue: Kate Brodsky Squash Pavilion
- All-time record: 676–223 (.752)
- All-Americans: 1
- Nickname: Bears
- Colors: Seal brown, cardinal red, and white
- Website: https://brownbears.com/sports/mens-squash

The Brown Bears men's squash team was a former team in the intercollegiate men's squash for Brown University located in Providence, Rhode Island. The team competed in the Ivy League within the College Squash Association. The university first fielded a varsity squash team in 1989. The former head coach was Stuart LeGassick. Brown University decided to eliminate 11 sports on May 31, 2020 including squash. Brown University will reinstate men's and women's squash on July 1, 2026.

== Year-by-year results ==
=== Men's Squash ===
Updated March 2020.

Year	Wins	Losses	Ivy League	Overall
2008–2009	7	9	7th	13th
2010–2011	8	10	7th	12th
2011–2012	8	11	8th	16th
2012–2013	8	12	7th (Tie)	16th
2013–2014	6	16	8th	18th
2014–2015	7	9	8th	19th
2015–2016	5	13	8th	16th
2016–2017	5	10	8th	19th
2017–2018	8	9	7th	12th
2018–2019	6	11	8th	18th
2019–2020	7	10	8th	14th

== Players ==
=== Current roster ===
Updated March 2026.

No.	Nat	Player	Class	Started	Birthplace
10	(United States)	Noah Cha	So.	2024	McLean, Virginia
9	(United States)	Griffin Taylor	Jr.	2023	Warwick, Rhode Island
4	(United States)	Isaac Dahan	So.	2024	Allentown, Pennsylvania
1	(Canada)	Harrison Yang	Jr.	2023	Richmond, British Columbia
3	(United States)	Tim Cassidy	Jr.	2023	Concord, Massachusetts
5	(United States)	Dawson Lin	Jr.	2023	Boston, Massachusetts
2	(United States)	Sean Magee	Fr.	2025	Phoenixville, Pennsylvania
7	(Canada)	Andrew Herring	Sr.	2022	Toronto, Ontario
6	(United States)	Archer Gould	Fr.	2025	New York, New York
8	(United States)	Jacob Robinson	So.	2024	Westport, Connecticut
	(United States)	Nate Meyer	Sr.	2022	New York, New York
	(United States)	Leon Zhou	So.	2024	Warren, New Jersey
	(United States)	Julian Jinich	So.	2024	Chevy Chase, Maryland

== See also ==
- List of college squash schools
