= Reddy Steward =

American football player (born 2001)

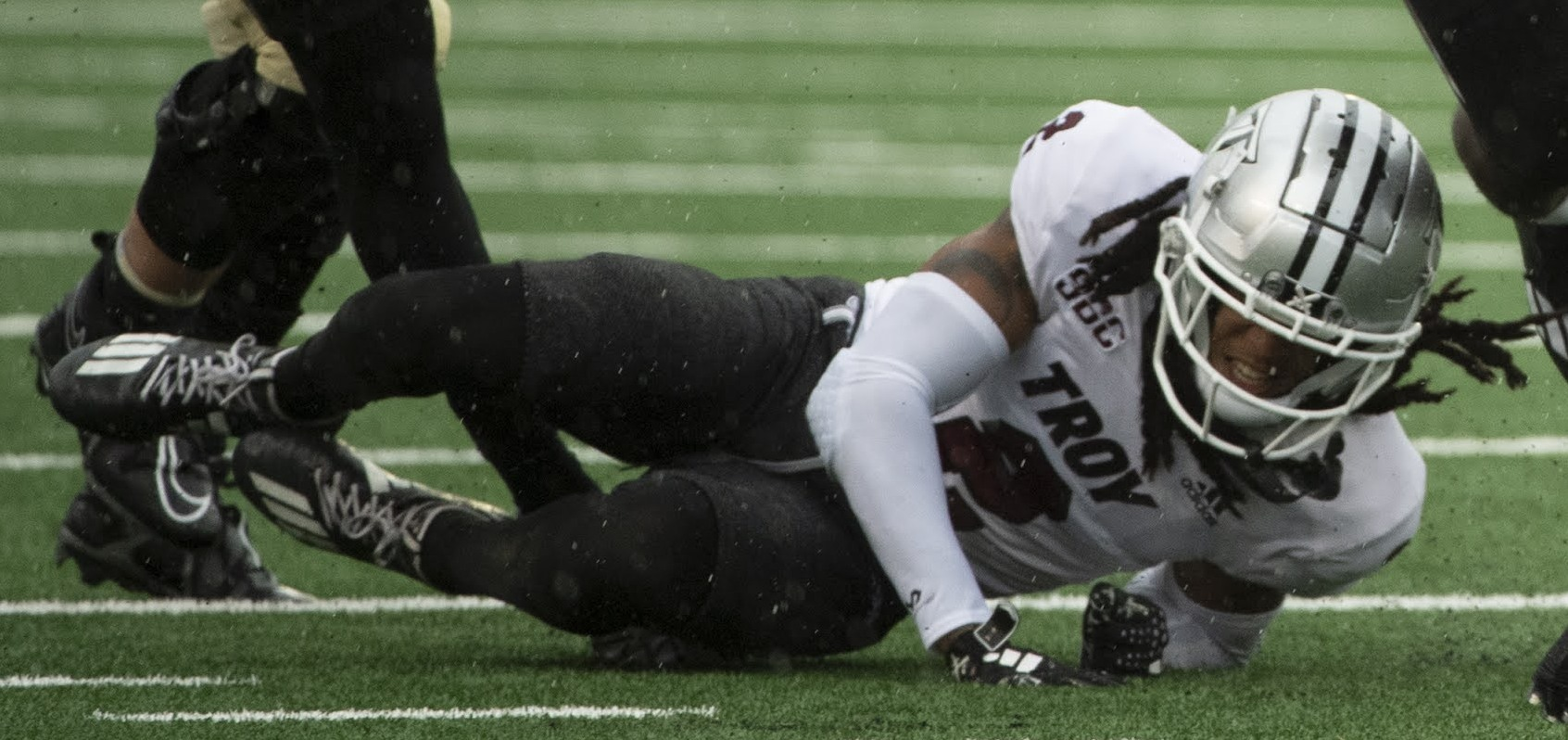
- Steward with Troy in 2023

Profile
- Position: Cornerback

Personal information
- Born: May 4, 2001 (age 25); Sheffield, Alabama, U.S.
- Listed height: 5 ft 11 in (1.80 m)
- Listed weight: 178 lb (81 kg)

Career information
- High school: Austin (Decatur, Alabama)
- College: Troy (2019–2023)
- NFL draft: 2024: undrafted

Career history
- Chicago Bears (2024); Minnesota Vikings (2025)*; Dallas Cowboys (2025–2026)
- * Offseason or practice squad member only

Awards and highlights
- 2× First-team All-Sun Belt (2022, 2023)

Career NFL statistics as of 2025
- Total tackles: 64
- Forced fumbles: 2
- Sacks: 1.5
- Pass deflections: 3
- Stats at Pro Football Reference

Reddrick "Reddy" Stefon Steward (born May 4, 2001) is an American professional football cornerback. He played college football for the Troy Trojans.

== Early life ==
Steward attended Austin High School located in Decatur, Alabama. During Steward's senior season, he notched 36 tackles and three interceptions, while also notching eight touchdowns on offense. Coming out of high school, Steward was rated as a three-star recruit, where he held offers from schools such as FAU, Memphis, Michigan, Mississippi State, South Carolina, Southern Miss, and Troy. Ultimately, Steward committed to play college football for the Troy Trojans.

== College career ==
Steward had his best collegiate season in 2023, where he notched 50 tackles, four interceptions, and a touchdown, en route to being named first-team all Sun Belt. Steward finished his career at Troy playing in five seasons, where he totaled 181 tackles, two and a half sacks, 42 pass deflections, nine interceptions, and two pick-sixes, while also being named first team all Sun Belt twice.

== Professional career ==
Pre-draft measurables
Height	Weight	Arm length	Hand span	Wingspan	40-yard dash	10-yard split	20-yard split	20-yard shuttle	Three-cone drill	Vertical jump	Broad jump	Bench press
5 ft 10 5/8 in (1.79 m)	184 lb (83 kg)	30 1/4 in (0.77 m)	8 in (0.20 m)	6 ft 2 1/8 in (1.88 m)	4.45 s	1.52 s	2.77 s	4.44 s	7.07 s	34.5 in (0.88 m)	10 ft 6 in (3.20 m)	11 reps
All values from Pro Day

=== Chicago Bears ===
After not being selected in the 2024 NFL draft, Steward signed with the Chicago Bears as an undrafted free agent. During the 2024 preseason finale, Steward had a breakout game intercepting two passes one of which he returned 48 yards for a touchdown. He was waived on August 27, and re-signed to the practice squad. In Week 9 in the 2024 NFL season, Steward forced a fumble on Marvin Harrison Jr. which was recovered by the Bears.

=== Minnesota Vikings ===
On January 16, 2025, Steward signed a reserve/future contract with the Minnesota Vikings. He was waived on August 24.

=== Dallas Cowboys ===
On August 27, 2025, Steward was claimed off waivers by the Dallas Cowboys. He reunited with defensive coordinator Matt Eberflus. He played significant defensive snaps and also started in 5 games. Late in the season his role expanded in the Cowboys secondary after cornerback DaRon Bland was placed on season-ending injured reserve and the team waived Trevon Diggs ahead of the season finale. Although he struggled along with all of his defensive teammates, Steward showed solid coverage instincts and was a willing tackler despite being undersized. He posted 58 tackles (fifth on the team), four tackles for loss, 1.5 sacks, five quarterback hurries, three passes defensed, and one forced fumble.

On March 16, 2026, Steward signed his exclusive rights tender with the Cowboys. On August 30, he was waived by the Cowboys as a part of final roster cuts; he was re–signed to the team's practice squad the next day. On November 10, Steward was released.

== NFL career statistics ==
Legend
**Bold**	Career high

=== Regular season ===
Year	Team	Games		Tackles					Fumbles				Interceptions			
Year	Team	GP	GS	Cmb	Solo	Ast	Sck	TFL	FF	FR	Yds	TD	Int	Yds	TD	PD
2024	CHI	1	0	1	1	0	0.0	0	**1**	0	0	0	0	0	0	0
2025	DAL	17	5	**63**	**40**	**23**	**1.5**	**5**	**1**	0	0	0	0	0	0	**3**
Career		18	5	64	41	23	1.5	5	2	0	0	0	0	0	0	3
