= Roschon Johnson =

American football player (born 2001)

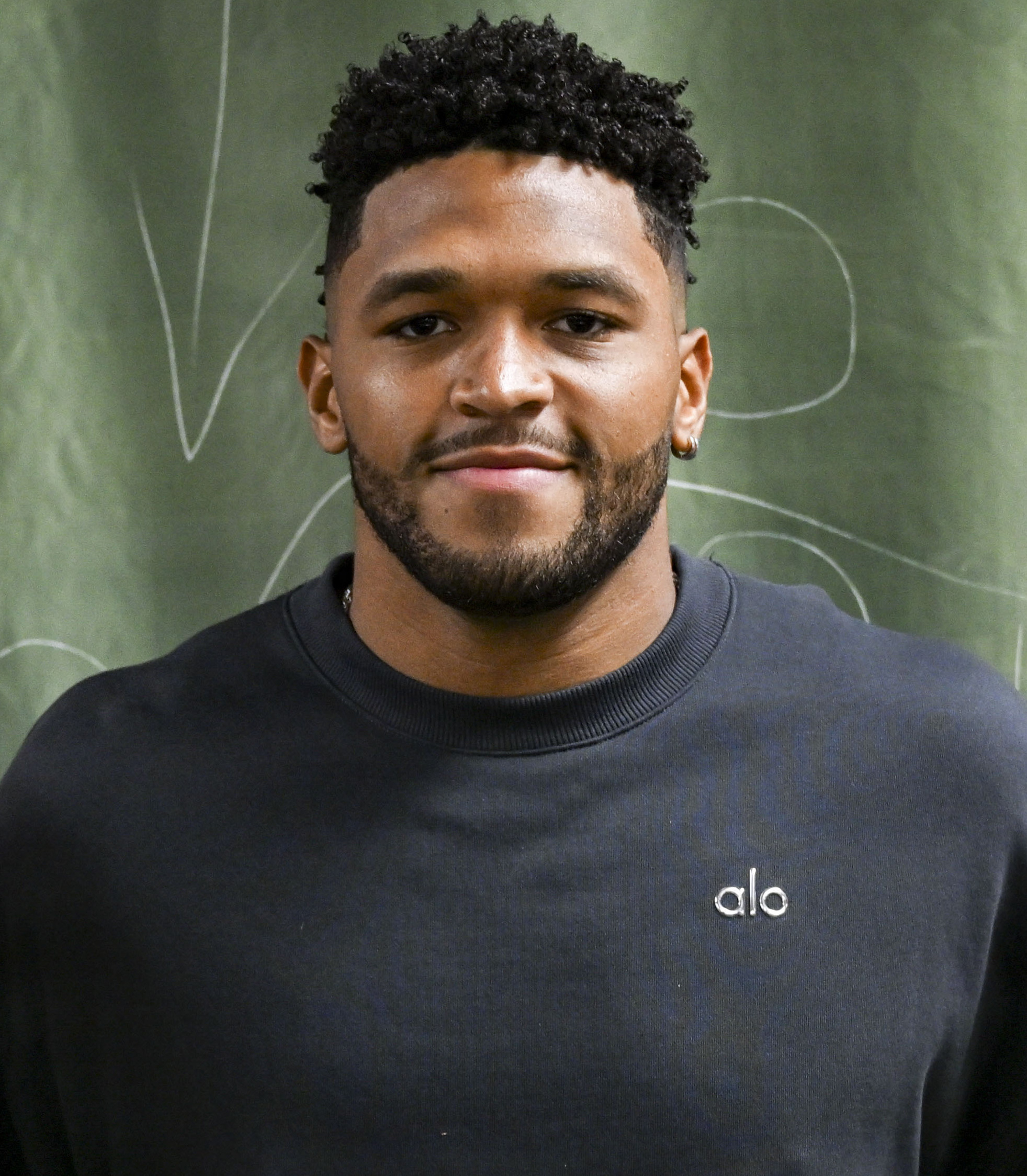
- Johnson in 2026

No. 23 – Chicago Bears
- Position: Running back
- Roster status: Active

Personal information
- Born: January 31, 2001 (age 25); Port Arthur, Texas, U.S.
- Listed height: 6 ft 0 in (1.83 m)
- Listed weight: 227 lb (103 kg)

Career information
- High school: Port Neches–Groves (Port Neches, Texas)
- College: Texas (2019–2022)
- NFL draft: 2023: 4th round, 115th overall pick

Career history
- Chicago Bears (2023–present)

Career NFL statistics as of Week 7, 2026
- Rushing yards: 605
- Rushing average: 3.7
- Rushing touchdowns: 9
- Receptions: 58
- Receiving yards: 388
- Stats at Pro Football Reference

Roschon Johnson (roh-SHON; born January 31, 2001) is an American professional football running back for the Chicago Bears of the National Football League (NFL). He played college football for the Texas Longhorns and was selected by the Bears in the fourth round of the 2023 NFL draft.

== Early life ==
Johnson was born on January 31, 2001, in Port Arthur, Texas. During his early childhood, he moved to Groves, Texas, and attended Port Neches–Groves High School in Port Neches, Texas. Johnson played quarterback for the Port Neches–Groves football team, completing 181 of 279 pass attempts for 2,918 yards and 35 touchdowns with five interceptions and 227 rushes for 1,627 yards and 29 touchdowns in 2017. Johnson passed 2,343 yards and 24 touchdowns while also rushing for 1,623 yards and 26 touchdowns in his senior season. He finished as Port Neches–Groves' all-time leading passer with 7,710 yards and second with 4,900 rushing yards. Johnson was rated a four-star recruit and committed to play college football for the Texas Longhorns.

== College career ==
Johnson began attending the University of Texas at Austin in January 2019. He moved to running back during his freshman season due to injuries at the RB position. Johnson finished the season with 649 rushing yards and seven touchdowns on 123 carries and 158 receiving yards and one touchdown on 23 receptions. As a sophomore, Johnson served mostly as the Longhorns' backup running back behind Bijan Robinson and rushed 80 times for 418 yards and six touchdowns and caught eight passes for 51 yards and one touchdown. He rushed for 569 yards and five touchdowns on 96 carries in his junior season. Johnson enrolled at the McCombs School of Business in January 2021 and graduated with a degree in business management in May 2022.

== Professional career ==
Pre-draft measurables
Height	Weight	Arm length	Hand span	Wingspan	40-yard dash	10-yard split	20-yard split	Vertical jump	Broad jump
6 ft 0 1/4 in (1.84 m)	219 lb (99 kg)	32 in (0.81 m)	9 5/8 in (0.24 m)	6 ft 4 7/8 in (1.95 m)	4.58 s	1.52 s	2.66 s	31.5 in (0.80 m)	10 ft 2 in (3.10 m)
All values from NFL Combine

Johnson was selected by the Chicago Bears in the fourth round (115th overall) of the 2023 NFL draft. He signed his four-year rookie contract worth $4.6 million. Johnson scored his first professional touchdown on a two-yard rush in the fourth quarter of the Bears' Week 1 loss to the Green Bay Packers. As a rookie, he appeared in 15 games. He finished with 81 carries for 352 rushing yards and two rushing touchdowns to go with 34 receptions for 209 receiving yards.

In Week 2 of the 2024 season, Houston Texans linebacker Azeez Al-Shaair punched Johnson in his facemask on September 15, 2024, and was fined $11,000 by the league, though at the time the officials missed the punch and Al-Shaair wasn't ejected during the game. Johnson did not retaliate after he was punched, and wrote on social media: "It took every bit of my soul not to thrash that boy."

Johnson began the 2025 season as an auxiliary running back behind D'Andre Swift and Kyle Monangai. In seven appearances for the Bears, he recorded two rushes for 17 yards. On November 22, 2025, Johnson was placed on injured reserve due to a thumb injury.

2026 began with Johnson retaining his supporting role to Swift and Monangai, but he began to see increased action in Week 4 after Swift fumbled and did not play the rest of the game and in following weeks after Monangai suffered an injury. Johnson recorded just six carries for five yards in a Week 5 loss to the Packers. He had a four-yard touchdown and led the Bears with 51 rushing yards in Week 6 against the Atlanta Falcons; despite losing a fumble late, he recorded the final first down to secure the 31–23 win.

== Career statistics ==
=== NFL ===
Legend
**Bold**	Career high

Year	Team	Games		Rushing					Receiving					Fumbles	
Year	Team	GP	GS	Att	Yds	Avg	Lng	TD	Rec	Yds	Avg	Lng	TD	Fum	Lost
2023	CHI	**15**	0	**81**	352	4.3	**29**	2	**34**	**209**	6.1	**24**	0	**1**	0
2024	CHI	14	0	55	150	2.7	9	**6**	16	104	**6.5**	17	0	0	0
2025	CHI	7	0	2	17	**8.5**	11	0	0	0	0.0	0	0	0	0
Career		36	0	138	519	3.8	29	8	50	313	6.3	24	0	1	0

=== College ===
Year	Team	Games		Rushing				Receiving			
Year	Team	GP	GS	Att	Yds	Avg	TD	Rec	Yds	Avg	TD
2019	Texas	**13**	0	**123**	**649**	5.3	**7**	**23**	**158**	6.9	**1**
2020	Texas	10	1	80	418	5.2	6	8	51	6.4	**1**
2021	Texas	12	**3**	96	569	5.9	5	11	83	7.5	0
2022	Texas	12	1	93	554	**6.0**	5	14	128	**9.1**	**1**
Career		47	5	392	2,190	5.6	23	56	420	7.5	3
