= Josh Blackwell =

American football player (born 1999)

- Blackwell in 2026

No. 39 – Chicago Bears
- Position: Cornerback / Return specialist
- Roster status: Active

Personal information
- Born: April 5, 1999 (age 27); Buford, Georgia, U.S.
- Listed height: 5 ft 11 in (1.80 m)
- Listed weight: 179 lb (81 kg)

Career information
- High school: Buford
- College: Duke (2017–2021)
- NFL draft: 2022: undrafted

Career history
- Philadelphia Eagles (2022)*; Chicago Bears (2022–present)
- * Offseason or practice squad member only

Career NFL statistics as of 2025
- Total tackles: 53
- Forced fumbles: 2
- Fumble recoveries: 2
- Pass deflections: 2
- Interceptions: 1
- Defensive touchdowns: 1
- Stats at Pro Football Reference

Josh Blackwell (born April 5, 1999) is an American professional football cornerback and return specialist for the Chicago Bears of the National Football League (NFL). He played college football for the Duke Blue Devils.

== Professional career ==
Pre-draft measurables
Height	Weight	Arm length	Hand span	Wingspan	40-yard dash	10-yard split	20-yard split	20-yard shuttle	Three-cone drill	Vertical jump	Broad jump	Bench press
5 ft 10 3/4 in (1.80 m)	183 lb (83 kg)	30 1/8 in (0.77 m)	8 1/8 in (0.21 m)	6 ft 0 5/8 in (1.84 m)	4.34 s	1.55 s	2.56 s	4.31 s	6.75 s	37.0 in (0.94 m)	10 ft 10 in (3.30 m)	11 reps
All values from Pro Day

=== Philadelphia Eagles ===
After going unselected in the 2022 NFL draft, Blackwell was signed by the Philadelphia Eagles as an undrafted free agent. He was waived by Philadelphia on August 30, 2022, as part of the team's final roster cuts.

=== Chicago Bears ===
On August 31, 2022, Blackwell was claimed off waivers by the Chicago Bears. On January 4, 2023, he was placed on injured reserve.

Blackwell entered the 2023 season as a backup cornerback. He suffered a hamstring injury in Week 3 and was placed on injured reserve on September 29, 2023. He was activated on November 9.

During the 2024 season, Blackwell was occasionally tasked with returning punts. In the final game against the Green Bay Packers, he scored his first NFL touchdown on a 94-yard punt return, giving the Bears an early 7–0 lead. The Bears went on to win 24–22, and Blackwell was named NFC Special Teams Player of the Week for his performance. He also recorded his first career interception off Jacksonville Jaguars quarterback Trevor Lawrence in Week 6.

On March 6, 2025, Blackwell signed a two-year contract extension with the Bears. In Week 4, he blocked a game-winning field goal attempt to preserve the Bears' 25–24 victory over the Las Vegas Raiders. In Week 16 against the Green Bay Packers, Blackwell recovered a Cairo Santos onside kick late in the fourth quarter, helping propel Chicago to an eventual 22–16 overtime victory.

In Week 6 of 2026 against the Atlanta Falcons, Blackwell recovered Zachariah Branch's muffed punt to set up a Bears touchdown.
