= Cairo Santos =

Brazilian-American gridiron football player (born 1991)

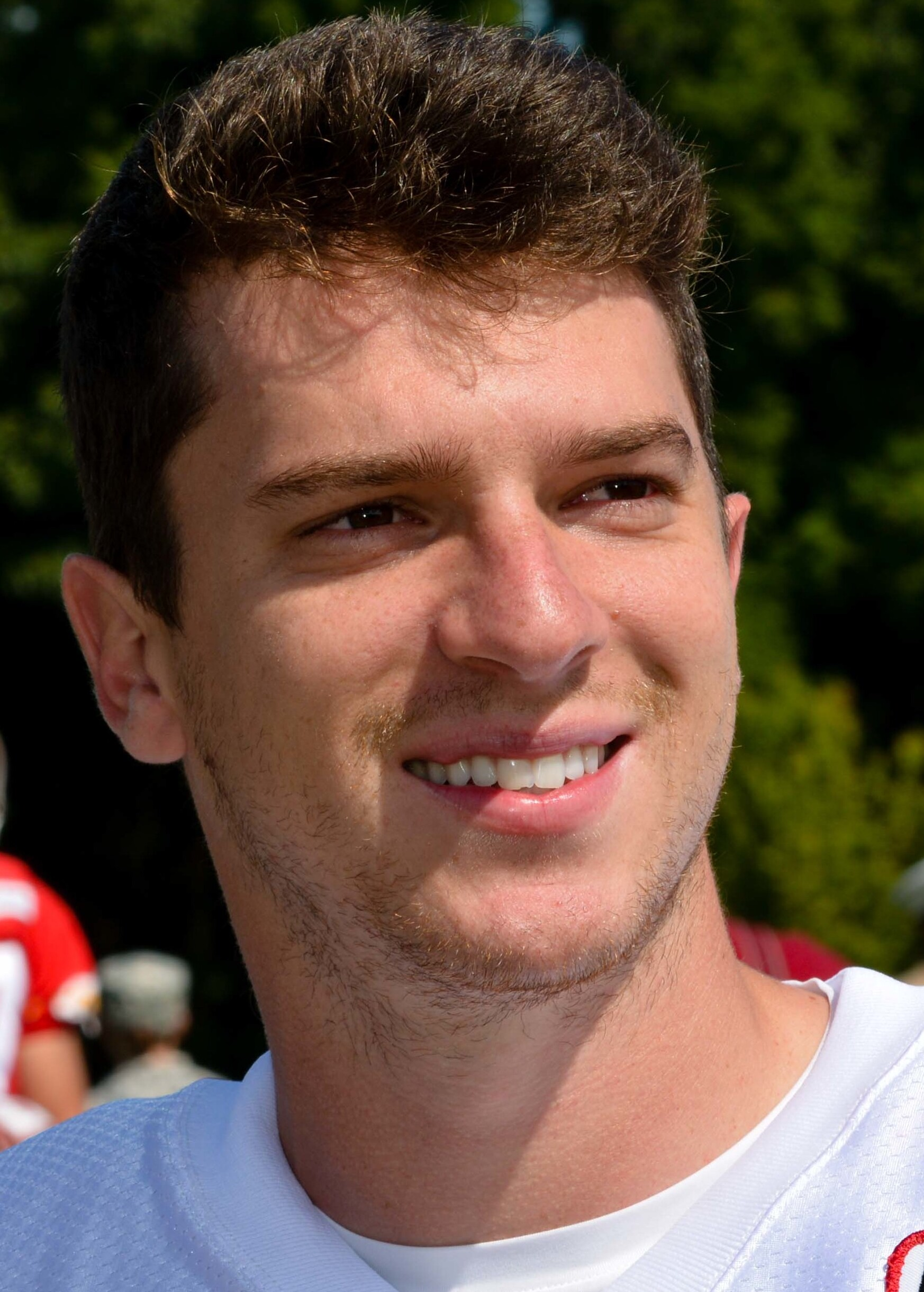
- Santos in 2015

No. 8 – Chicago Bears
- Position: Placekicker
- Roster status: Active

Personal information
- Born: 12 November 1991 (age 35); Limeira, São Paulo, Brazil
- Listed height: 5 ft 8 in (1.73 m)
- Listed weight: 173 lb (78 kg)

Career information
- High school: St. Joseph Academy (St. Augustine, Florida, U.S.)
- College: Tulane (2010–2013)
- NFL draft: 2014: undrafted

Career history
- Kansas City Chiefs (2014–2017); Chicago Bears (2017); New York Jets (2018)*; Los Angeles Rams (2018); Tampa Bay Buccaneers (2018); Tennessee Titans (2019); Chicago Bears (2020–present)
- * Offseason or practice squad member only

Awards and highlights
- Lou Groza Award (2012); Consensus All-American (2012); 2× First-team All-C-USA (2012, 2013)

Career NFL statistics as of Week 7, 2026
- Field goals made: 277
- Field goals attempted: 327
- Field goal %: 84.7%
- Extra points made: 367
- Extra points attempted: 383
- Extra point %: 95.8%
- Points: 1,198
- Longest field goal: 58
- Touchbacks: 383
- Stats at Pro Football Reference

Cairo Fernandes Santos (KYE-roh SAN-tohs, SAWN-; born 12 November 1991) is a Brazilian-American professional American football placekicker for the Chicago Bears of the National Football League (NFL). He played college football for the Tulane Green Wave and was signed by the Kansas City Chiefs as an undrafted free agent in 2014. Santos is the first Brazilian-born player in NFL history.

Santos spent parts of his first four seasons in the NFL with the Chiefs, before being released midway in the 2017 season. Between 2017 and 2019, he had brief stints with the Chicago Bears, New York Jets, Los Angeles Rams, Tampa Bay Buccaneers, and Tennessee Titans. In 2020, Santos was reacquired by the Bears and has remained with them since.

== Early life ==
Born on 12 November 1991 in Limeira, in the state of São Paulo, Brazil, Santos was raised in Brasília, the capital, where his father worked as a pilot for Varig. Santos was unfamiliar with American football until he moved to St. Augustine, Florida, as a foreign exchange student at age 15. Originally, Santos planned to stay at St. Joseph Academy for a year to learn English, but soon found that the kicking skills he had developed playing soccer in Brazil translated well to field goal kicking in American football. With the opportunity to earn a college scholarship, Santos remained in Florida, sharpening his kicking skills throughout high school.

== College career ==
Santos committed to Tulane on 22 January 2010. He also received interest from Georgia Tech, Jacksonville, and Miami (OH).

Santos played in all 12 games as a freshman and was named to the Conference USA (C-USA) All-Freshman Team and was honorable-mention All C-USA after leading the Green Wave in points scored while making 13 of his 16 field goal attempts (81.3%), 32 of his 33 PATs (97%), and handling kickoff duties.

As a sophomore, Santos played in all 13 games and finished second on the team in scoring, making 11 of 18 field goals (61.1%) and 33 of 34 PATs (97.1%) while handling kickoffs and punting duties, averaging 41 yards a punt.

Santos had a breakout year as a junior as he went 26 of 27 (96.3%) on PATs (his only miss was blocked) and 21 of 21 (100%) on field goals, including a school record 57-yard field goal. His 21 made field goals without a miss set an NCAA Division I record that still stands as of 2026. Twelve of those field goals were from 40-plus yards and 2 from 50-plus, and 31 of his 55 kickoffs (56.4%) went for touchbacks. At the end of the season, Santos was named consensus All-American and received the Lou Groza Award for the nation's most outstanding placekicker.

Santos went on to compete in the 2014 NFLPA Collegiate Bowl, where he connected on a 39-yard field goal.

== Professional career ==
Pre-draft measurables
Height	Weight	Arm length	Hand span	Wingspan
5 ft 8 1/8 in (1.73 m)	164 lb (74 kg)	28 1/2 in (0.72 m)	8 7/8 in (0.23 m)	5 ft 7 1/8 in (1.70 m)
All values from NFL Combine

=== Kansas City Chiefs ===
==== 2014 season ====
Santos was signed as an undrafted free agent by the Kansas City Chiefs on 19 May 2014. He was named the Chiefs kicker on 30 August, beating veteran Ryan Succop for the position.

On 7 September 2014, Santos became the first Brazilian-born player ever to play in an NFL regular season game in a 26–10 loss to the Tennessee Titans, kicking his first career field goal. After missing two field goals in his first two games, he made his next 13 field goal attempts, including a clutch game-winning field goal with 26 seconds left in a Week 7 victory over the San Diego Chargers and a 53-yard field goal the following week against the St. Louis Rams.

In the 2014 season, Santos converted all 38 extra point attempts and 25 of 30 field goal attempts. Santos was the team leader in scoring with 113 points, the most by a rookie in Chiefs history. He also made most field goals (25) by a rookie kicker in Chiefs history (tied with Ryan Succop).

==== 2015 season ====
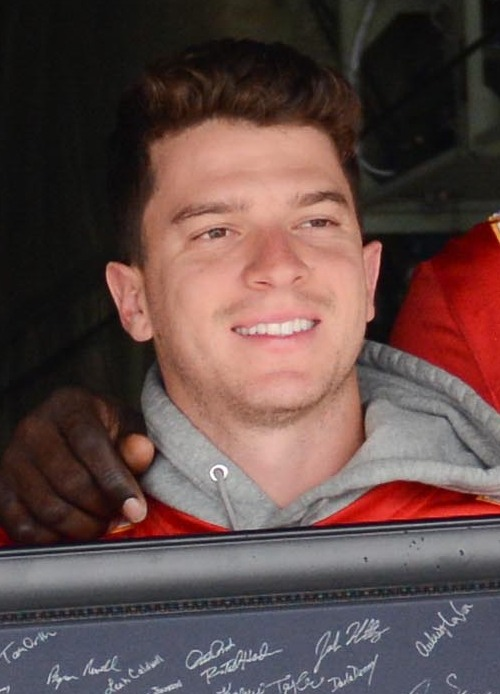
Santos in 2015

During a Week 4 36–21 loss to the Cincinnati Bengals, Santos kicked a team record seven field goals, including two over 50 yards. His seven field goals tied him with five players for the second most all-time in a single game. During Week 10, Santos made five field goals of six attempts against the Denver Broncos, the second game in the season with at least five field goals made. During Week 15, Santos kicked a 53-yard field goal against the Baltimore Ravens. This was the fourth field goal with at least 50 yards in the season. In the 2015 season, Santos converted 39 of 41 extra point attempts and 30 of 37 field goal attempts.

In a 30–0 victory against the Houston Texans in the American Football Conference (AFC) Wild Card Round game, Santos became the first Brazilian player to play in an NFL playoff game. He made three field goals and three extra point attempts. He kicked two 49-yard field goals, the longest field goals in the Chiefs postseason history. In his second postseason game, Santos made two field goals in a 20–27 loss to the New England Patriots in the AFC Divisional Round game.

==== 2016 season ====
In Week 2, Santos kicked a 54-yard field goal in a 12–19 loss to the Texans, the longest field goal of his professional career.

Santos made two field goals in the 30–27 overtime victory against the Broncos including the game-winner, a 34-yard field goal attempt that bounced off the left upright.

In November, Santos was named AFC Special Teams Player of the Month for the first time after converting 11 of 11 field goals and all five extra points. In the 2016 season, Santos appeared in all 16 games and converted 36 of 39 extra point attempts and 31 of 35 field goal attempts.

==== 2017 season ====
After missing much of training camp and the preseason with a groin injury, Santos returned at the start of the 2017 season. He started by converting all six extra point attempts in a 42–27 victory over the Patriots on Thursday Night Football. On 26 September, the Chiefs placed Santos on injured reserve. On 30 September, the Chiefs waived Santos from injured reserve.

=== Chicago Bears ===
On 20 November 2017, Santos signed with the Chicago Bears. He missed his first field-goal attempt as a member of the Bears, a 54-yarder. On 4 December, Santos was placed on injured reserve after hurting his groin in pregame warmups in Week 13 against the San Francisco 49ers. He totaled five games in the 2017 season with two teams. He finished converting all 14 extra point attempts and four of five field goal attempts.

=== New York Jets ===
On 15 March 2018, Santos signed a one-year contract with the New York Jets. He was released on 22 August.

=== Los Angeles Rams ===
On 2 October 2018, Santos signed with the Los Angeles Rams to serve as their starting kicker while Greg Zuerlein recovered from a groin injury. In his first game, Santos made a game-winning 39-yard field goal in a 33–31 victory over the Seattle Seahawks. He was released on 16 October after two games once Zuerlein was deemed healthy.

=== Tampa Bay Buccaneers ===
On 12 November 2018, Santos was signed by the Tampa Bay Buccaneers after Chandler Catanzaro was released. In his Tampa Bay debut, he was perfect on all five extra-point attempts in the 38–35 loss to the New York Giants in Week 11. In Week 15, Santos made his 100th career field goal in the 20–12 loss to the Ravens. In the 2018 season, with two teams, he converted 22 of 23 extra point attempts and 14 of 18 field goal attempts.

On 13 March 2019, Santos re-signed with the Buccaneers. On 31 August, Santos was released.

=== Tennessee Titans ===
On 4 September 2019, Santos was signed by the Titans after Ryan Succop was placed on injured reserve. Santos was perfect in his team debut, connecting on two field-goal attempts as well as all five of his extra-point attempts in a 43–13 victory over the Cleveland Browns. On 6 October, in a 14–7 Week 5 loss to the Buffalo Bills, Santos missed four field goal attempts while also making an extra point. He was released by the Titans the next day. Santos appeared in five games in the 2019 season, converting all 12 extra point attempts and four of nine field goal attempts.

=== Chicago Bears (second stint) ===
==== 2020 season ====
Santos returned to the Bears on 25 August 2020. He was released on 5 September during final roster cuts, and was signed to the practice squad the next day.

Santos was elevated to the active roster a day before the 2020 season opener against the Detroit Lions following starting kicker Eddy Piñeiro's placement on injured reserve. Santos made both of his field goal attempts (35 and 28 yards) and all three extra points as the Bears won 27–23. He was reverted to the practice squad the next day before being promoted to the 53-man roster on 16 September. Against the Buccaneers in Week 5, he made the game-winning 38-yard field goal with 1:19 remaining. In Week 6 against the Carolina Panthers, he converted a career-long 55-yard field goal as the Bears won 23–17; he was later named National Football Conference (NFC) Special Teams Player of the Week. Santos was named the NFC Special Teams Player of the Month for his performance in December.

Santos finished the 2020 season by making 36 of 37 extra point attempts and 30 of 32 field goal attempts. He also kicked a franchise-high 27 consecutive successful field goals during the season.

==== 2021 season ====
On 11 March 2021, Santos signed a three-year contract extension with the Bears worth $9 million.

In 2021, Santos continued his success from the previous season, making his first 13 attempted field goals in the season and extending his streak of consecutive made field goals from the previous season to 40. This streak was broken during the Bears' Week 9 game against the Pittsburgh Steelers, when he was sent out to attempt a 65-yard field goal with 0:02 seconds remaining in the fourth quarter which fell short, conserving the Steelers' 29–27 win. Following the bye week, Santos made 13 of his 16 attempted field goals over the final eight games of the season, and finished the season going 26 for 30 on field goals and 27 for 28 on extra points.

==== 2022 season ====
In Week 7 of the 2022 season, Santos made all four field goals and all three extra points in a 33–14 win over the Patriots, earning NFC Special Teams Player of the Week. In the 2022 season, Santos converted 27 of 32 extra point attempts and 21 of 23 field goal attempts. He missed the Bears' game against the New York Giants for a personal matter.

==== 2023 season ====
Santos was named NFC Special Teams Player of the Month for November of the 2023 season. On 23 December 2023, he signed a four-year extension with the Bears running through to the 2027 season worth $16 million with $9.5 million guaranteed. In the 2023 season, Santos converted 31 of 33 extra point attempts and 35 of 38 field goal attempts.

==== 2024 season ====
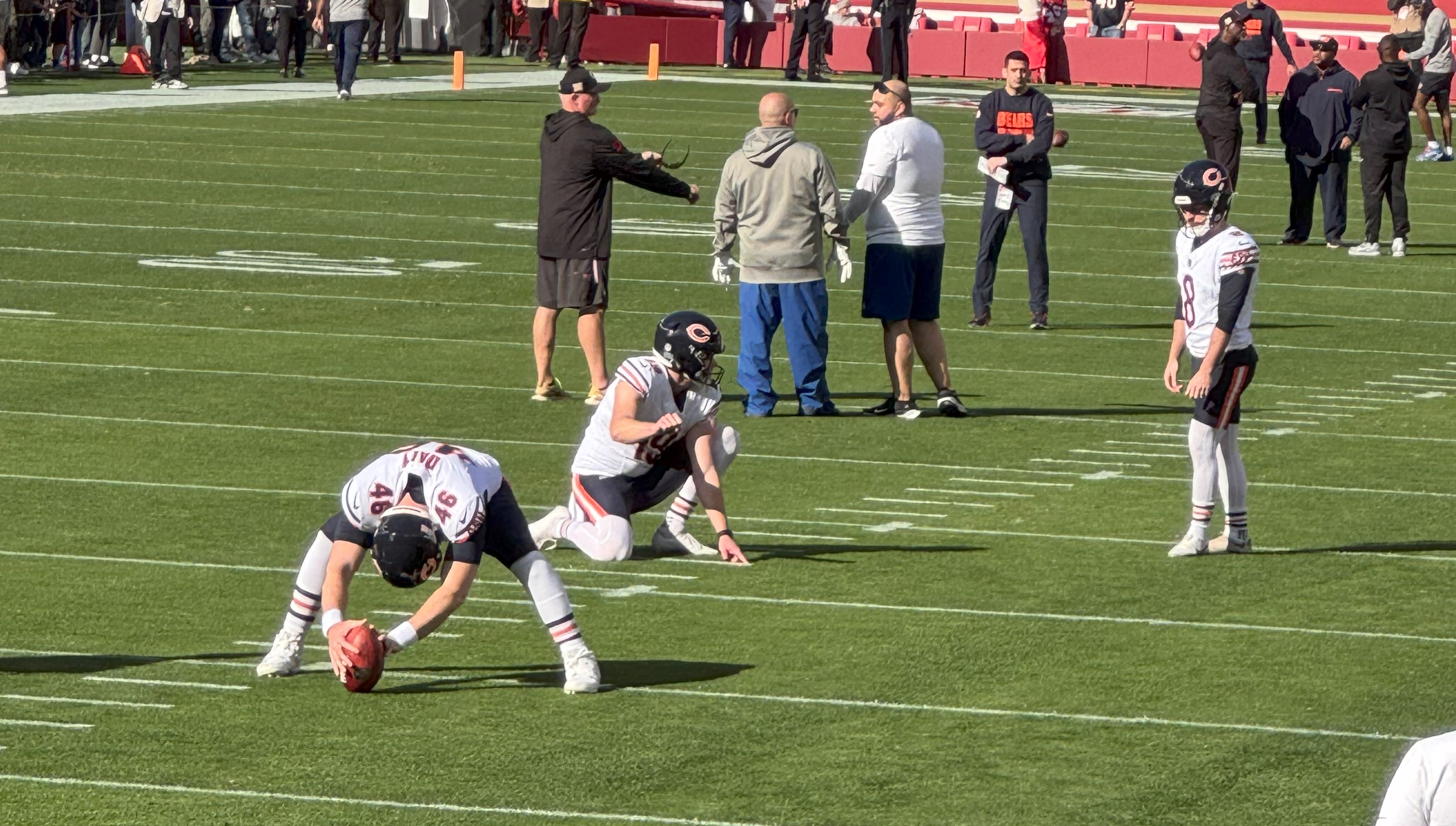
Santos (right) with Bears long snapper Scott Daly and holder Tory Taylor during pre-game warm-ups in 2024

Santos was the kicker for the game-deciding field goals in both matchups against the Green Bay Packers: he had a 46-yard kick blocked to seal a 20–19 defeat at home in Week 11, then made a 51-yard field goal as time expired to win 24–22 in Week 18 at Lambeau Field. Santos described himself as "feeling this anger inside" after the first game such that when he made the Week 18 game winner, "I could only remember the feeling of the Packers rushing the field at Soldier Field. So I took off running all around. Just so we could all feel the same way." Santos converted 25 of 26 extra point attempts and 21 of 25 field goal attempts in the 2024 season. He also made eight field goals from 50 yards or longer, a single-season Bears record.

==== 2025 season ====
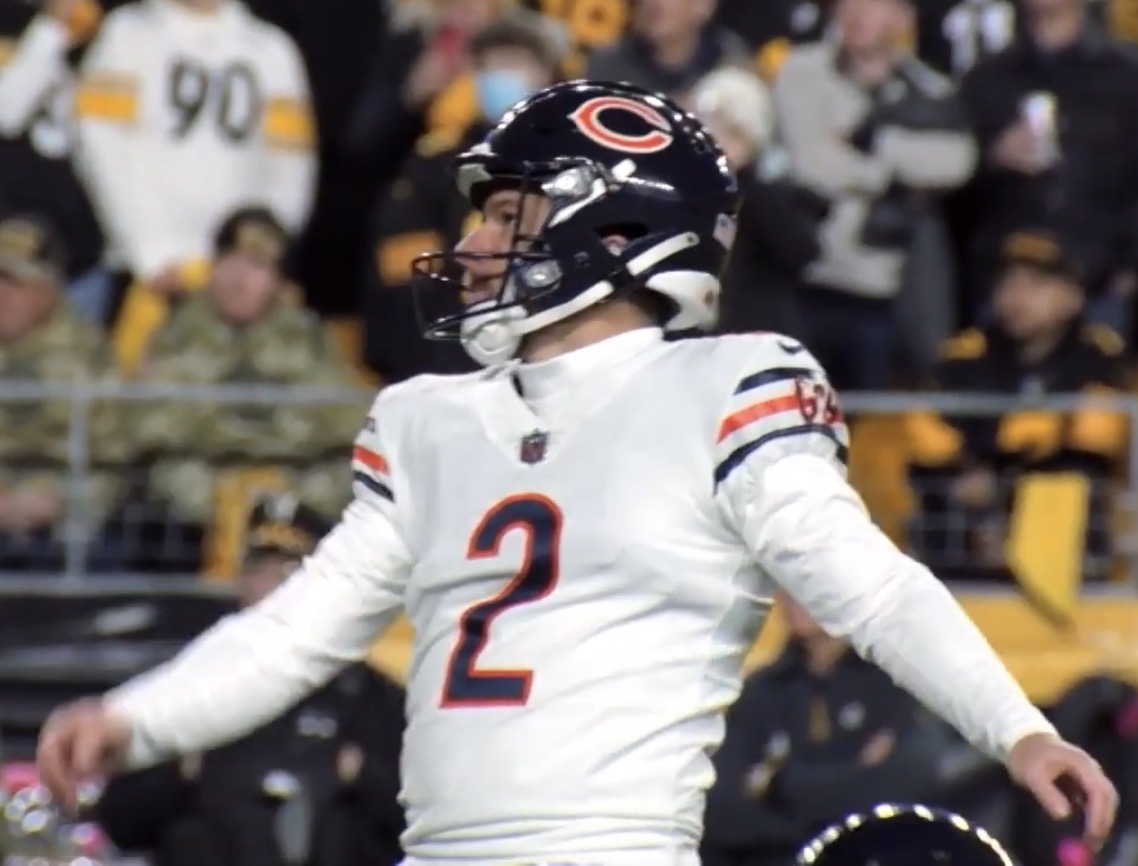
Santos in 2025

In the first game of the season against the Minnesota Vikings, Santos made a 42-yard field goal but missed another from 50 in the fourth quarter. A late kickoff by Santos failed to force a touchback, with the Vikings instead returning the kick past the two-minute warning and preventing the Bears from using the pause as a natural timeout; Bears head coach Ben Johnson also stated the "intent was for the ball to go out of the end zone" on the kickoff. The Bears lost that game by three points.

In Week 4 against the Las Vegas Raiders, Santos made all four field goals as the Bears won 25–24. However, he hurt his quadriceps during the game and was unable to do kickoffs. Santos missed the Washington Commanders and New Orleans Saints games as a result, only the second and third times he was unavailable as a Bear since becoming their full-time kicker.

Santos returned to the team in Baltimore, where he converted two of three field goals but had a 58-yard attempt fall short. A week later against the Bengals, his opening kickoff could not reach the end zone and was returned 98 yards for a touchdown. Santos also missed a 47-yard kick that was nullified by a penalty and had another from the same distance blocked, but made two other field goals in the 47–42 victory.

Santos made four of five field goals in Week 11 against the Vikings, including the game-winning 48-yard kick as time expired to secure the 19–17 victory. One of the conversions was a 54-yard kick, his 24th for the Bears from at least 50 yards to surpass Robbie Gould for the most from that range in team history.

Week 16 against the Packers took place amid heavy winds at Soldier Field that caused the goal posts to sway. Despite the conditions, which led to the ball arcing wildly in different directions while in the air, all three of Santos' field goal tries were successful. Santos compared his strategy for the game to golfing in the wind by treating it as "more of a crosswind that you just have to play perfect". His onside kick was also recovered by the Bears to set up the game-tying touchdown. He received NFC Special Teams Player of the Week for his performance. He converted all 39 extra point attempts and 25 of 30 field goal attempts in the 2025 season.

==== 2026 season ====
The 2026 season began with Santos making all eight extra point attempts and a 40-yard field goal as the Bears beat the Panthers 59–37. In the following week's loss to the Vikings, he scored his team's only points on a 50-yard kick but had a 23-yard attempt blocked. He also missed a 43-yard try in Green Bay in Week 5, followed by a 56-yarder in the next game against the Atlanta Falcons.

In the Week 7 meeting with the Patriots, Santos had a 53-yard field goal hit the upright. On Chicago's final drive of the game, he converted a career-long 58-yard field goal to put the Bears ahead by nine points, helping secure a 30–24 victory. Two weeks later, he made a 38-yard field goal as time expired to beat the Buccaneers 27–24.

== NFL career statistics ==
Legend
**Bold**	Career High

=== Regular season ===
Year	Team	GP	Overall FGs					PATs				Kickoffs			Points
Year	Team	GP	Blk	Lng	FGA	FGM	Pct	XPA	XPM	Pct	Blk	KO	Avg	TB	Points
2014	KC	16	0	53	30	25	83.3	38	38	**100.0**	0	80	63.6	26	113
2015	KC	16	1	53	37	30	81.1	**41**	**39**	95.1	0	**90**	63.8	40	129
2016	KC	16	0	54	35	31	88.6	39	36	92.3	1	86	62.7	48	129
2017	KC	3	0	39	3	3	100.0	12	12	**100.0**	0	18	**65.4**	10	21
2017	CHI	2	0	38	2	1	50.0	2	2	**100.0**	0	2	65.0	2	5
2018	LAR	2	0	39	6	5	83.3	6	5	83.3	0	13	63.2	7	20
2018	TB	7	0	45	12	9	75.0	17	17	**100.0**	0	36	59.9	12	44
2019	TEN	5	1	53	9	4	44.4	12	12	**100.0**	0	21	63.8	12	24
2020	CHI	16	0	**55**	32	30	93.8	37	36	97.3	1	86	61.1	42	126
2021	CHI	**17**	1	47	30	26	86.7	28	27	96.4	0	71	62.6	34	105
2022	CHI	16	1	51	23	21	91.3	32	27	84.4	0	49	62.8	28	90
2023	CHI	**17**	0	**55**	**38**	**35**	92.1	33	31	93.9	**2**	76	63.6	**60**	**136**
2024	CHI	**17**	**2**	54	25	21	84.0	26	25	96.2	**2**	71	62.9	38	88
2025	CHI	15	0	54	30	25	83.3	39	**39**	**100.0**	0	81	59.4	18	114
Total		165	6	55	312	266	85.3	362	346	95.6	4	780	62.4	377	1144

=== Postseason ===
Year	Team	GP	Overall FGs					PATs				Kickoffs			Points
Year	Team	GP	Blk	Lng	FGA	FGM	Pct	XPA	XPM	Pct	Blk	KO	Avg	TB	Points
2015	KC	**2**	0	49	**5**	**5**	**100.0**	**5**	**5**	**100.0**	0	**12**	60.8	**10**	**20**
2016	KC	1	0	48	1	1	**100.0**	1	1	**100.0**	0	4	61.3	1	4
2020	CHI	1	0	36	1	1	**100.0**	0	0	—	0	2	**65.0**	2	3
2025	CHI	**2**	0	**51**	4	4	**100.0**	4	4	**100.0**	0	**12**	57.6	2	16
Total		6	0	51	11	11	100.0	10	10	100.0	0	30	59.8	15	43

=== Accomplishments and records ===
==== Kansas City Chiefs ====
- Most points by a kicker, game: 21 on 4 October 2015
- Most field goals made, game: 7
- Most field goals made, game (playoffs) (tied with other 3 players): 3 on 9 January 2016
- Most field goals made, no misses, game: 7
- Most field goals attempted, game (tied with Jan Stenerud): 7
- Most field goals, 50+ yards, game (tied with other 3 players): 2 on 4 October 2015
- Most games, 2+ field goals made, season (tied with other 3 players): 10, 2016
- 2nd highest field goal percentage, career (min. 100 attempts): 84.8

==== Chicago Bears ====
- Most consecutive made field goals (40)
- Most consecutive made field goals in a single season (27) in 2020
- Highest single-season field goal completion percentage (93.8%) in 2020
- Most field goals made over 50 yards in a single season: 8 (2024)
- Most field goals made over 50 yards: 24
- Longest field goal (tied Robbie Gould): 58 yards

==== College ====
- Lou Groza Award (2012)
- Consensus All-American (2012)

== Personal life ==
On 15 September 2013, Santos' father died in a plane crash in Brazil. "I used to talk to my dad every day, all the time. We were very close. He was my biggest fan, very supportive of my career, always wishing me to do well, no matter what. He will always be there for me. I know. After each successful kick or game I always think about him. I point my fingers to the sky in honor of him."

In the 2016 "My Cause My Cleats" NFL campaign, Santos honored Chapecoense, a Brazilian association football club, due to the aircraft crash that occurred with the delegation of the club killing 71 people in Colombia on 28 November 2016.

Santos is a naturalized US citizen.
