= Micah Baskerville =

American football player (born 1999)

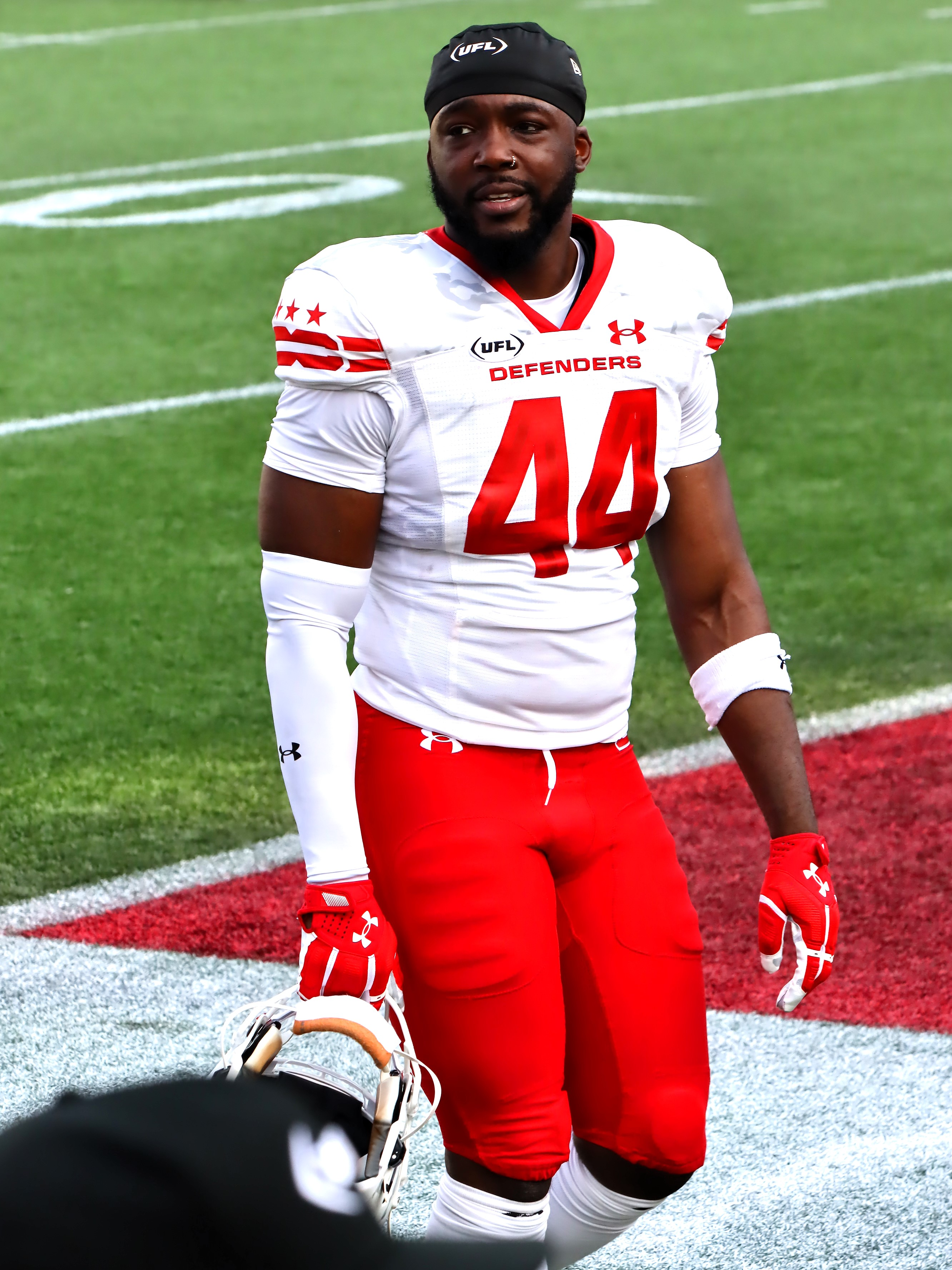
- Baskerville with the DC Defenders in 2025

No. 44 – DC Defenders
- Position: Linebacker
- Roster status: Active

Personal information
- Born: October 19, 1999 (age 27); Shreveport, Louisiana, U.S.
- Listed height: 6 ft 0 in (1.83 m)
- Listed weight: 224 lb (102 kg)

Career information
- High school: Evangel Christian (Shreveport, Louisiana)
- College: LSU (2018–2022)
- NFL draft: 2023: undrafted

Career history
- Chicago Bears (2023–2024)*; DC Defenders (2025–present)
- * Offseason or practice squad member only

Awards and highlights
- UFL champion (2025)
- Stats at Pro Football Reference

Micah Baskerville (born October 19, 1999) is an American professional football linebacker for the DC Defenders of the United Football League (UFL). He played college football for the LSU Tigers.

== Early life ==
Baskerville's hometown is Shreveport, Louisiana, and he attended Evangel Christian Academy. In Baskerville's high school career, he notched 39 tackles with nine being for a loss, and a fumble recovery. Baskerville committed to play college football at Louisiana State University.

== College career ==
In Baskerville's first season, 2018, he totaled 18 tackles, with 0.5 tackles going for a loss. In week four of the 2019 season, Baskerville blocked a punt and returned it for a touchdown; he also returned an onside kick for 46 yards as he helped LSU beat Vanderbilt. Baskerville finished the 2019 season with 15 tackles, four being for a loss, a sack, a pass deflection, a fumble recovery, and a touchdown. In week ten of the 2020 season, Baskerville had a career performance tallying 12 tackles, one going for a loss, and a forced fumble, but LSU would fall to Texas A&M 20–7. Baskerville finished the 2020 season with 55 tackles, 4.5 going for a loss, and a forced fumble. In week seven of the 2021 season, Baskerville recorded his first career interception, which he returned 54 yards, as he helped the Tigers beat Florida 49–42. In week eleven, Baskerville had a performance that included racking up 12 tackles, 3.5 being for a loss, and two sacks, but LSU would lose versus Arkansas. Baskerville finished the 2021 season with 83 tackles, nine going for a loss, two sacks, three pass deflections, and an interception. In week two of the 2022 season, Baskerville picked off a pass and returned it 29 yards for a touchdown, as he helped LSU beat Southern. In week six, Baskerville had a career day, making 15 tackles against Tennessee. Baskerville finished the 2022 season with 89 tackles, 4.5 being for a loss, one sack, eight pass deflections, one interception, and a touchdown.

Baskerville finished his career at LSU with 260 tackles, 22.5 going for a loss, four sacks, 12 pass deflections, two interceptions, a forced fumble, a fumble recovery, and two touchdowns.

== Professional career ==
Pre-draft measurables
Height	Weight	Arm length	Hand span	Wingspan	40-yard dash	10-yard split	20-yard split	20-yard shuttle	Three-cone drill	Vertical jump	Broad jump
6 ft 0 1/2 in (1.84 m)	221 lb (100 kg)	31 1/4 in (0.79 m)	9 5/8 in (0.24 m)	6 ft 5 7/8 in (1.98 m)	4.84 s	1.68 s	2.72 s	4.75 s	7.69 s	35.5 in (0.90 m)	9 ft 7 in (2.92 m)
All values from NFL Combine/Pro Day

=== Chicago Bears ===
After not being selected in the 2023 NFL draft, Baskerville signed with the Chicago Bears as an undrafted free agent. He was waived on August 29, 2023 and re-signed to the practice squad. The Bears flexed Baskerville to active roster on November 4. He signed a reserve/future contract with Chicago on January 8, 2024.

On August 10, 2024, in a preaseason matchup against the Buffalo Bills, Baskerville intercepted a pass by Shane Buechele and returned it 56 yards for a touchdown. He was waived by Chicago on August 27, and was re-signed to the team's practice squad.

=== DC Defenders ===
On May 7, 2025, Baskerville signed with the DC Defenders of the United Football League (UFL).
