= Sean Magee =

American football coach and executive

Career information
- High school: Lake Oswego (Lake Oswego, Oregon)
- College: Navy (2000-2003)

Career history
- Navy (2012–2016) Director of Player Personnel; Michigan (2017–2022) Associate Athletic Director for Football; Chicago Bears (2022–2023) Chief of Staff; Michigan (2024–2025) General Manager

Sean Magee is an American football executive, and former naval officer and football player. He worked as an executive for the Navy Midshipmen, Chicago Bears and Michigan Wolverines.

== Playing career ==
Magee played for Navy from 2000 to 2003 as an offensive lineman. After graduation he served as a naval officer from 2004 to 2012. He was stationed in Japan, and also the Persian Gulf as a part of Operations Iraqi Freedom and Enduring Freedom. He obtained a master's in Business Administration from the Mason School of Business in 2012.

== Executive career ==
Magee began his career after being discharged, serving the role of the Director of Player Personnel at his alma mater from 2012 until 2016. In 2017, he first arrived as the Associate Athletic Director for Football for the Michigan Wolverines, where he assisted in roster construction and providing oversight and direction for off-field activities under Jim Harbaugh. In May 2022, he was hired by the Chicago Bears as chief of staff under Matt Eberflus. During his tenure in Chicago, the Bears went 10–24. The following year, Magee left Chicago to return to Michigan, where he was hired by new head coach Sherrone Moore as general manager for the football program. In November 2024, he was instrumental in the signing of quarterback Bryce Underwood, flipping his verbal commitment from LSU. After the 2025 season, Michigan and new head coach Kyle Whittingham parted ways with Magee on February 17, 2026.

== Personal life ==
Magee was born in Belmont, California on May 23, 1982. He went to Lake Oswego High School where he is a member of the high school athletic hall of fame. He is married to his wife, Sarah, and has five sons together.
