= Kemeria Abajobir Abajifar =

Ethiopian royal personality

Kemeria Abajobir
- Born: Kemeria Abajobir Abajifar; 19 June 1972 (age 52); Jimma, Oromia, Ethiopia

Kemeria Abajobir Abajifar (born 19 June 1972) is an Ethiopian royal personality. She is the great-granddaughter of Abba Jifar II, and the niece of Ababiya Abajobir, a founding member of the Oromo Liberation Front. It was reported that Count Alexandre de Lesseps ended his marriage to reality TV personality LuAnn de Lesseps due to his relationship with her.
