= Abajobir =

Abajobir is a surname. Notable people with the surname include:

- Ababiya Abajobir (fl. from 1974), Ethiopian activist
- Kemeria Abajobir Abajifar (born 1972), Ethiopian princess, niece of Ababiya
