= Chic C'est la Vie =

2011 single by Countess Luann

Single by Countess Luann
- Released: June 28, 2011
- Studio: KMA Studio (New York City)
- Genre: Dance-pop
- Length: 3:05
- Label: Ultra
- Songwriter(s): Luann de Lesseps; Chris Young
- Producer(s): Chris Young

Countess Luann singles chronology
"Money Can't Buy You Class" (2010)	"Chic C'est la Vie" (2011)	"Girl Code" (2015)

Music video
- "Chic C'est la Vie" on YouTube

"Chic C'est la Vie" is the second single by American television personality Luann de Lesseps, under the stage name and former courtesy title of Countess Luann. She wrote the song with Chris Young, its sole producer. Following the performance of her debut single "Money Can't Buy You Class", "Chic C'est la Vie" was released as a follow-up on June 28, 2011, through Ultra Records. Musically, it is a dance-pop song with a quick, electronic beat. de Lesseps sings in a mostly spoken word style, and the song's lyrics discuss her extravagant lifestyle.

Music critics provided mostly negative reviews of "Chic C'est la Vie", with some praise for the catchy refrain. An accompanying music video was filmed at the Borgata resort in Atlantic City, and was documented during an episode of The Real Housewives of New York City in 2011. de Lesseps invited the series' cast to appear in the clip, and was ultimately joined by members Jill Zarin and Kelly Killoren Bensimon. The video spawned several internet GIFs.

== Background and release ==
In mid 2010, Luann de Lesseps released "Money Can't Buy You Class", her first single with Ultra Records. Lyrically, it is an extension of the topics and themes explored in her book Class with the Countess: How to Live with Elegance and Flair (2009), and features etiquette and class tips. She worked with New York City-based producer Chris Young to write the song, and its recording process was documented throughout the third season of The Real Housewives of New York City, of which de Lesseps is a cast member. According to Young, his appearances in the series increased his visibility as a musician, resulting in a higher demand for other artists to work with him. Although "Money Can't Buy You Class" was panned by music critics, it became the third most-purchased song in The Real Housewives franchise, selling 19,000 copies.

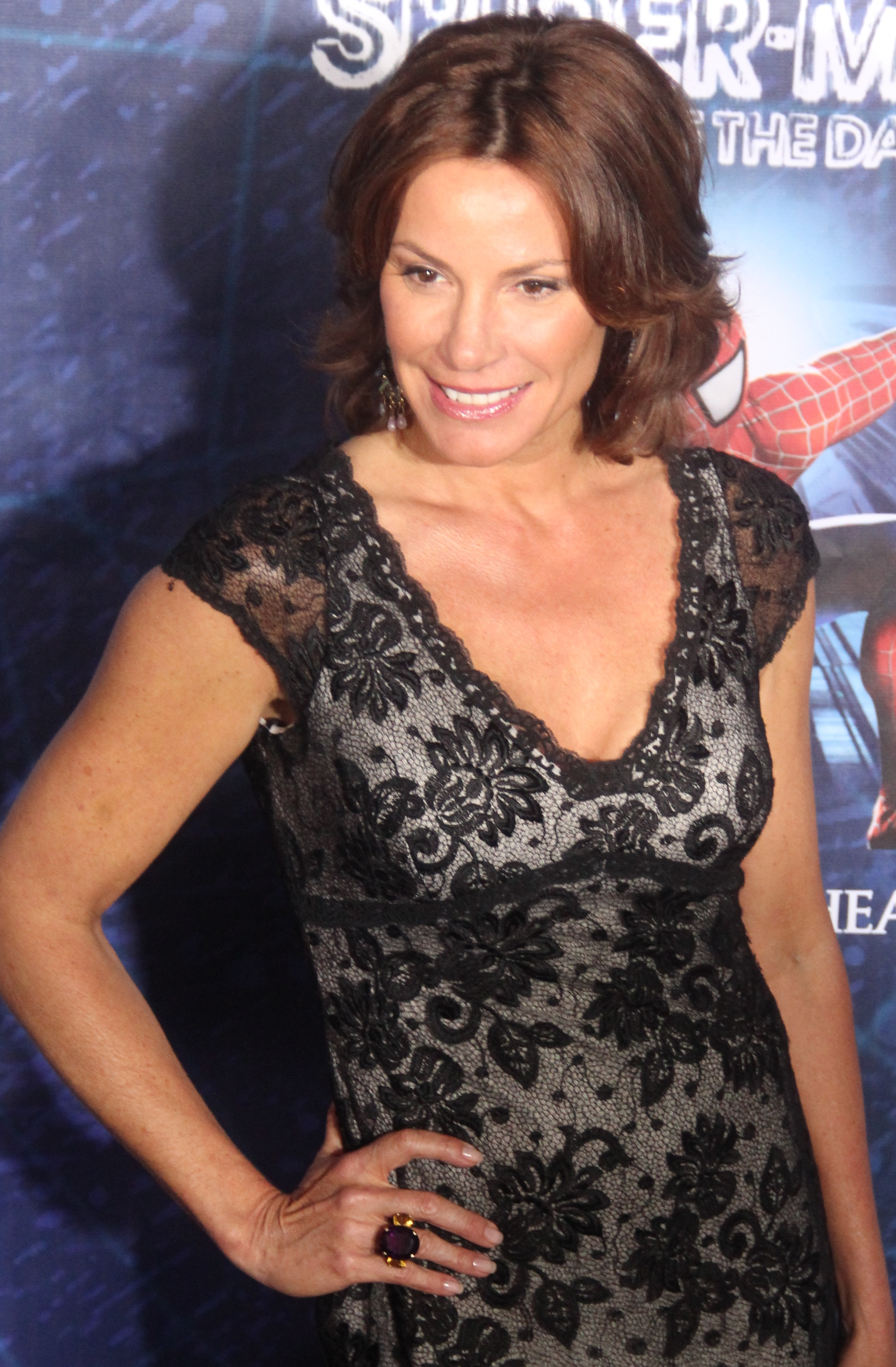
"Chic C'est la Vie" is the second single by Luann de Lesseps (pictured in 2011) released under Ultra Music.

de Lesseps recorded "Chic C'est la Vie" afterwards, which became her second single with Ultra. She reunited with Young to create the song, and he is also credited as a co-writer for the lyrics. Like its predecessor, "Chic C'est la Vie" was recorded at KMA Studio in New York City. On June 28, 2011, "Chic C'est la Vie" was formally released for digital download and streaming in the form of a digital extended play (EP). Three remixes are featured on the EP, including two produced by Gabi Newman and Lenny Fontana. The title of one of the remixes, the Moroccan mix, references a cast trip that de Lesseps went on during The Real Housewives of New York City. Also in June 2011, a launch party for the single was held at the former Bar Basque Spanish restaurant in New York City. de Lesseps cut ties with Ultra after "Chic C'est la Vie", and eventually signed with Eloli Music to release her third single, "Girl Code", in 2015.

== Composition and lyrics ==
"Chic C'est la Vie" is a dance-pop track with a fast, electronic beat. de Lesseps sings in a mostly spoken word style. The Awl's Mike Barthel called the song musically "utterly indistinguishable" from "Money Can't Buy You Class". "Chic C'est la Vie" is set in the time signature of 4/4, and has an average tempo of 130 beats per minute. The key of the song is in A minor and it advances with a setup of two verses, each followed by a refrain. The song utilizes the chord progression of F–G–Am–C throughout.

Lyrically, "Chic C'est la Vie" describes the riches and extravagance of de Lesseps' lifestyle. During the song's bridge, de Lesseps calls the names of her fellow Real Housewives cast members, and requests that they "bring something of theirs along"; for example, she tells Sonja Morgan and Ramona Singer to bring "her men" and a bottle of pinot grigio, respectively, and quips that she herself will "bring the diamonds". Ifan Llewelyn from QX felt that these callouts were actually "loaded metaphors" that represent de Lesseps' feelings on the other cast members.

== Critical reception ==
"Chic C'est la Vie" received mostly negative reviews from music critics. Stereogum's Gabe Delahaye panned the song, referring to it as de Lesseps' "contractual obligation to record at least one horrifically awful 'pop song'". Barthel criticized de Lesseps' performance on the song, calling it "half-hearted" due to the absence of her "persona of bored condescension she's so carefully cultivated". In a retrospective review of all music releases from the Real Housewives releases, Dave Quinn from People listed "Chic C'est la Vie" as the seventh best song, calling it a "total campy delight" and insisted that its refrain "instantaneously gets lodged in your head". A BlackBook critic reviewed the Moroccan mix of the song, and said it was worth a listen because of its "stunningly un-self-aware and over the top" nature.

== Music video ==
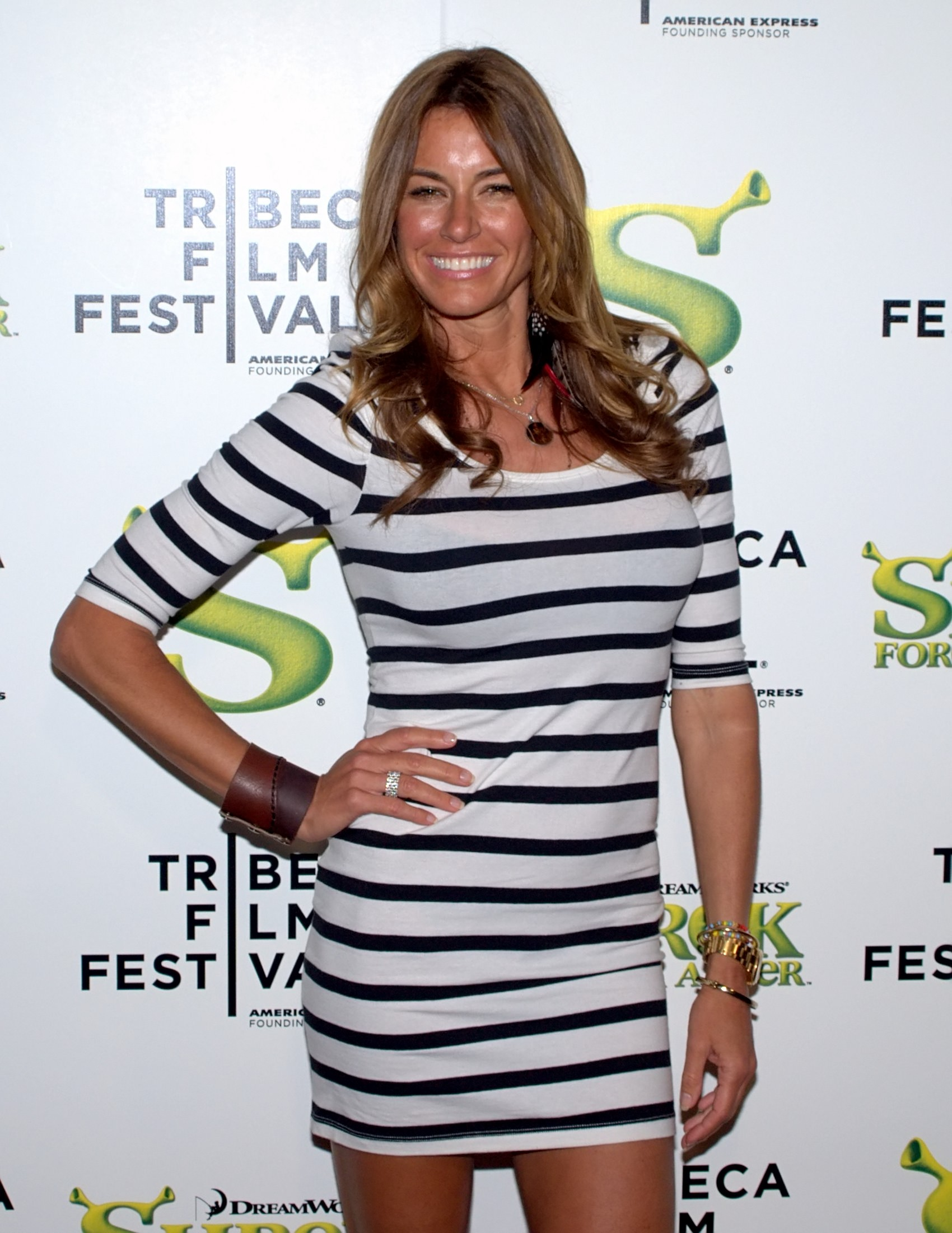
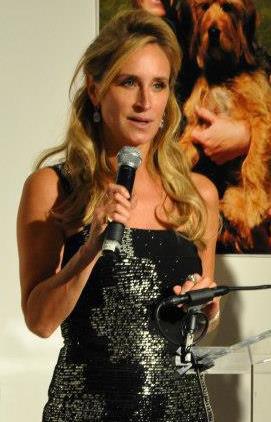
de Lesseps invited the entire cast of The Real Housewives of New York City to appear in the music video for "Chic C'est la Vie". Kelly Killoren Bensimon (left) appears in several scenes, but Sonja Morgan (right) declined the invitation.

The filming and production of the video were documented on The Real Housewives of New York City in 2011. Interior scenes were shot at the Borgata resort in nearby Atlantic City. The series' cast members were invited to appear in the video, but several declined to be featured. Morgan was one of them, and explained she did not want to be associated with de Lesseps' provocative image, citing the 2010 music video for "Money Can't Buy You Class". Two members, Jill Zarin and Kelly Killoren Bensimon, are featured in the video in supporting capacities. The clip opens with de Lesseps telling the viewer: "Ladies and gentlemen, this is the Countess speaking. We have arrived!" before arriving at the Borgata. Various scenes in the video depict de Lesseps enjoying herself with the resort's amenities, including partying at a club and casino, being chauffeured in a limousine, and relaxing poolside with Zarin and Killoren Bensimon.

Delahaye panned the video, questioning de Lesseps: "As a grown up adult, how are you going to make something worse than Ke$ha?". Quinn acknowledged that the video generated popular internet GIFs. It was uploaded to Ultra Records' official YouTube channel on June 30, 2011, and made available for digital download on July 12, the following month.

== Track listing ==
Digital download/streaming – remixes EP
No.	Title	Length
1.	"Chic C'est la Vie"	3:05
2.	"Chic C'est la Vie" (Moroccan mix)	3:10
3.	"Chic C'est la Vie" (L Fontana & G Newman remix radio edit)	3:33
4.	"Chic C'est la Vie" (L Fontana & G Newman Club remix)	6:03

== Release history ==
Release dates and formats for "Chic C'est la Vie"
Region	Date	Format(s)	Version	Label	Ref.
Various	June 28, 2011	Digital download; streaming	Remixes EP	Ultra	
