= The Masked Singer (American TV series) season 10 =

The Masked Singer
- Season 10
- Promotional poster for season ten, featuring letters with the textures of the costumes from previous seasons
- Starring: Robin Thicke; Jenny McCarthy Wahlberg; Ken Jeong; Nicole Scherzinger
- Hosted by: Nick Cannon
- No. of contestants: 16
- Winner: Ne-Yo as "Cow"
- Runner-up: John Schneider as "Donut"
- No. of episodes: 13

Release
- Original network: Fox
- Original release: September 27 – December 20, 2023

Season chronology
- ← Previous; Season 9 Next → Season 11

The tenth season of the American television series The Masked Singer premiered on Fox on September 27, 2023, following a preview special that aired on September 10, and concluded on December 20, 2023. The season was won by singer Ne-Yo as "Cow", with actor/singer John Schneider finishing second as "Donut", actor/singer Janel Parrish placing third as "Gazelle", and singer Macy Gray placing fourth as "Sea Queen".

== Panelists and host ==
Season 10 panelists and host

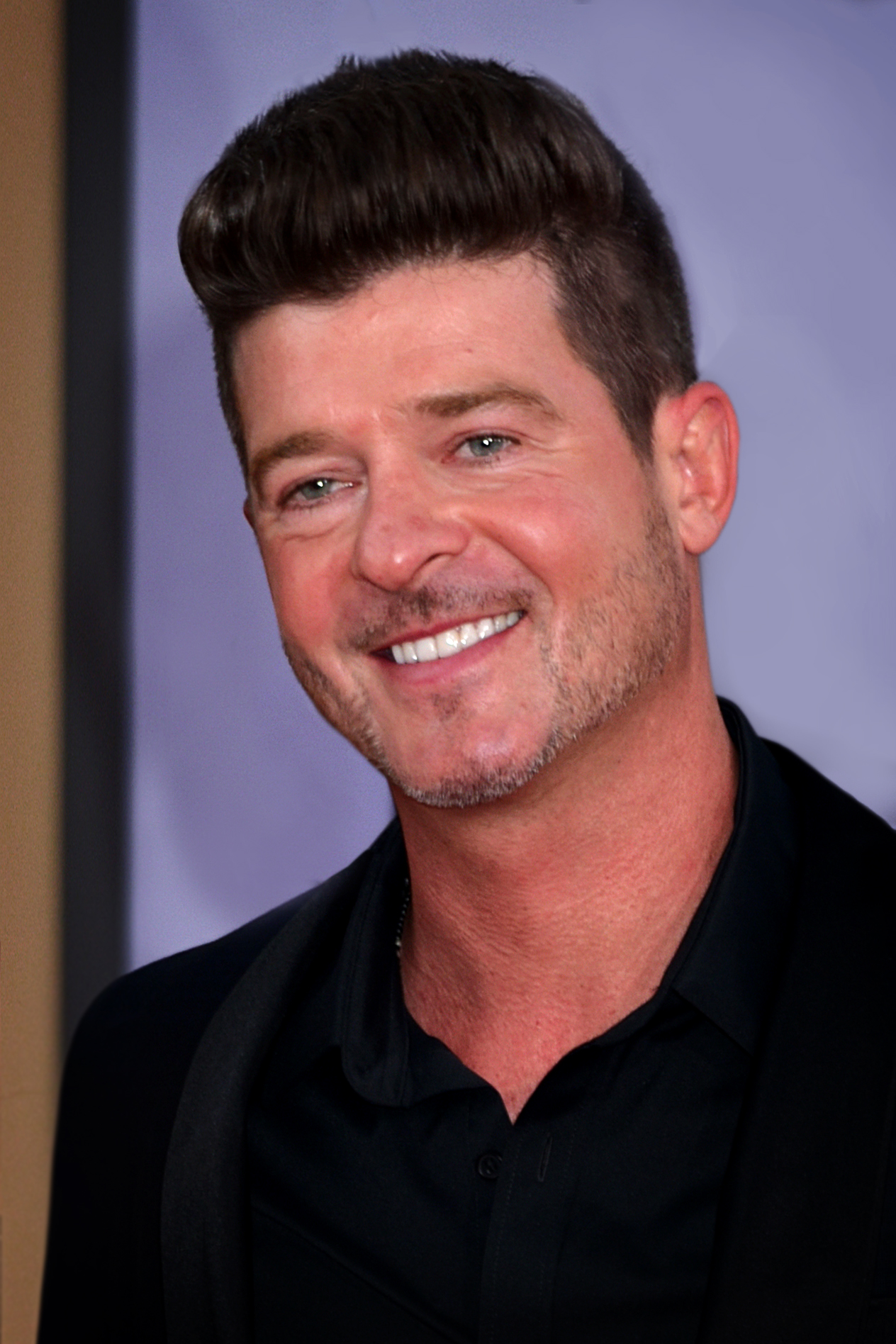
Robin Thicke

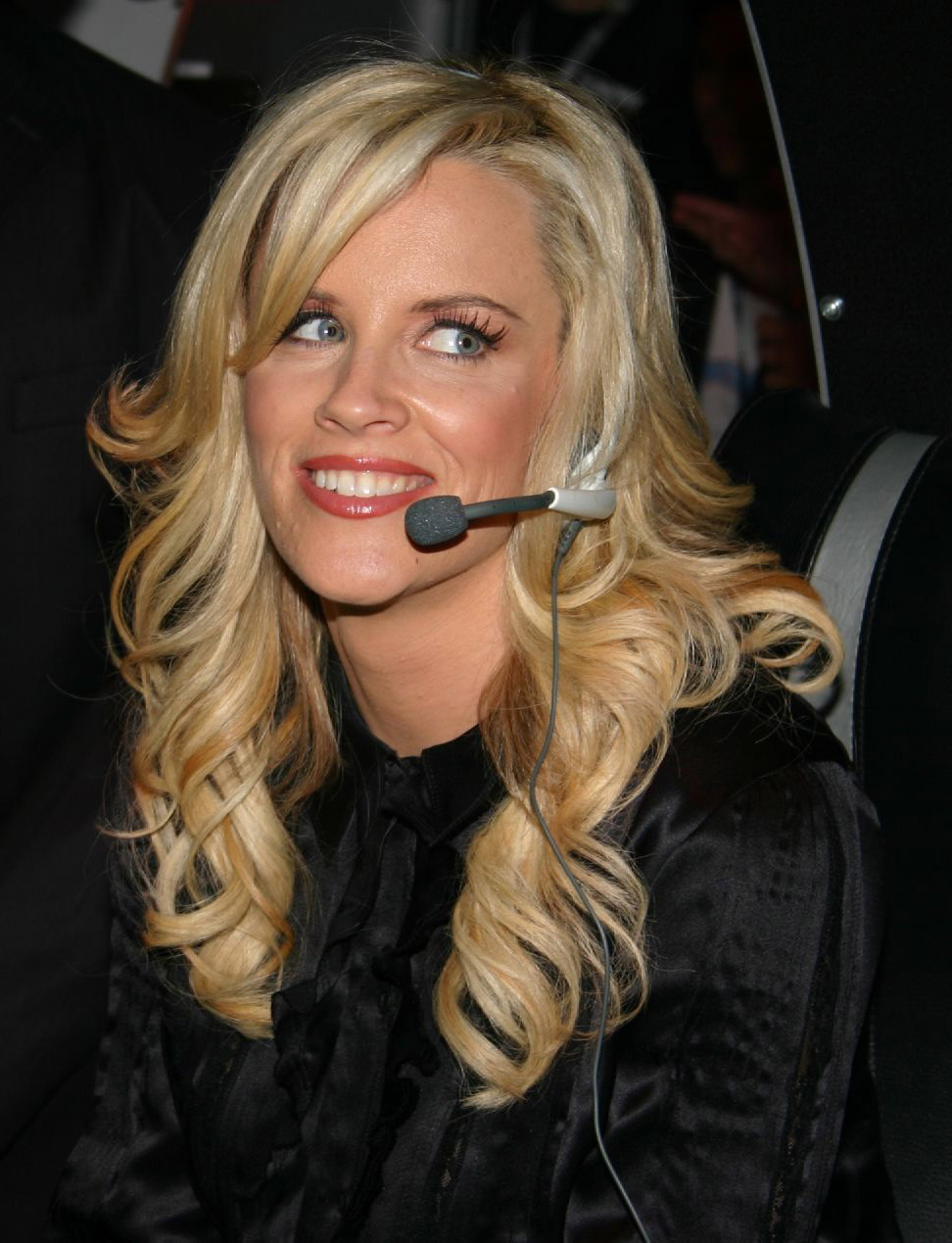
Jenny McCarthy Wahlberg

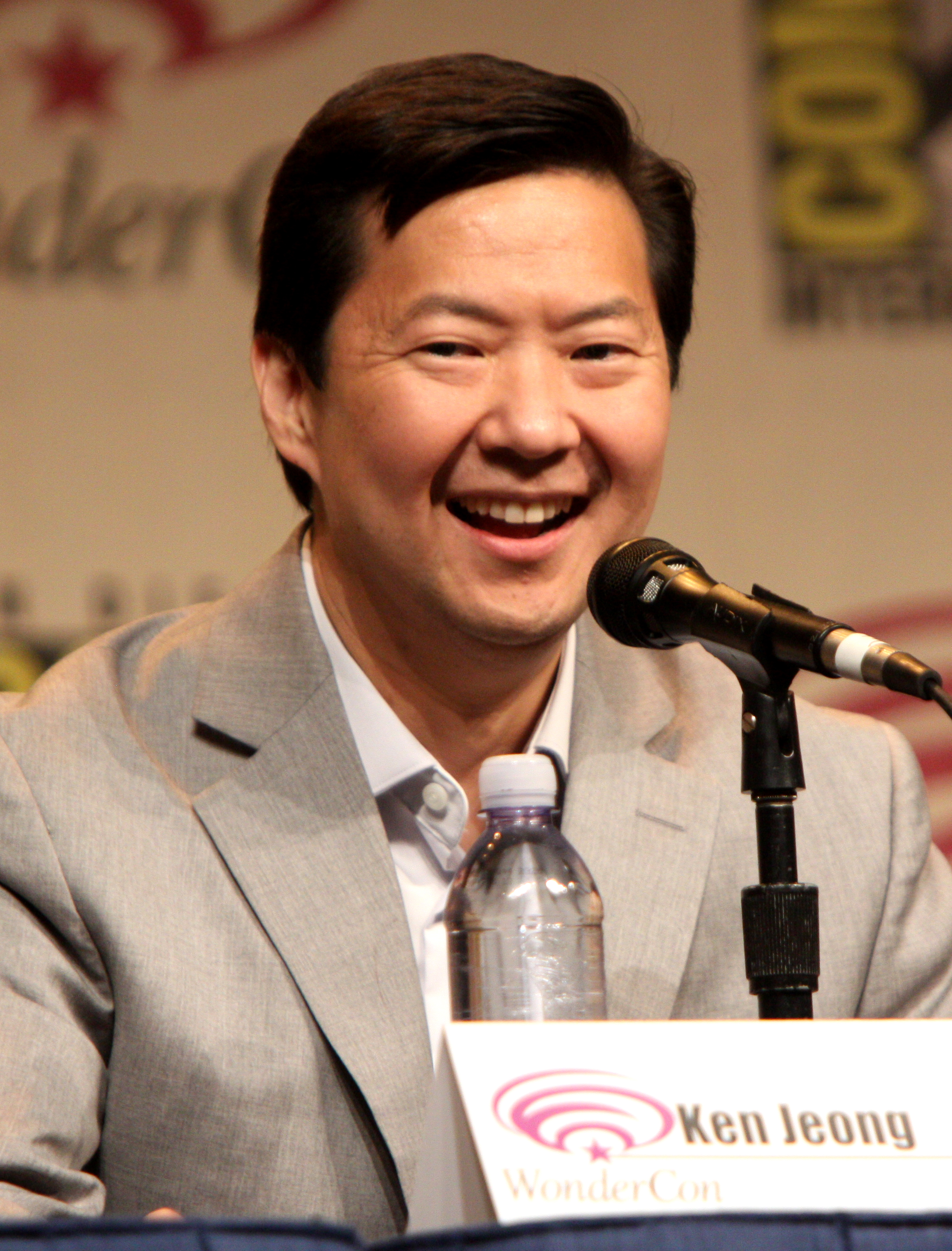
Ken Jeong

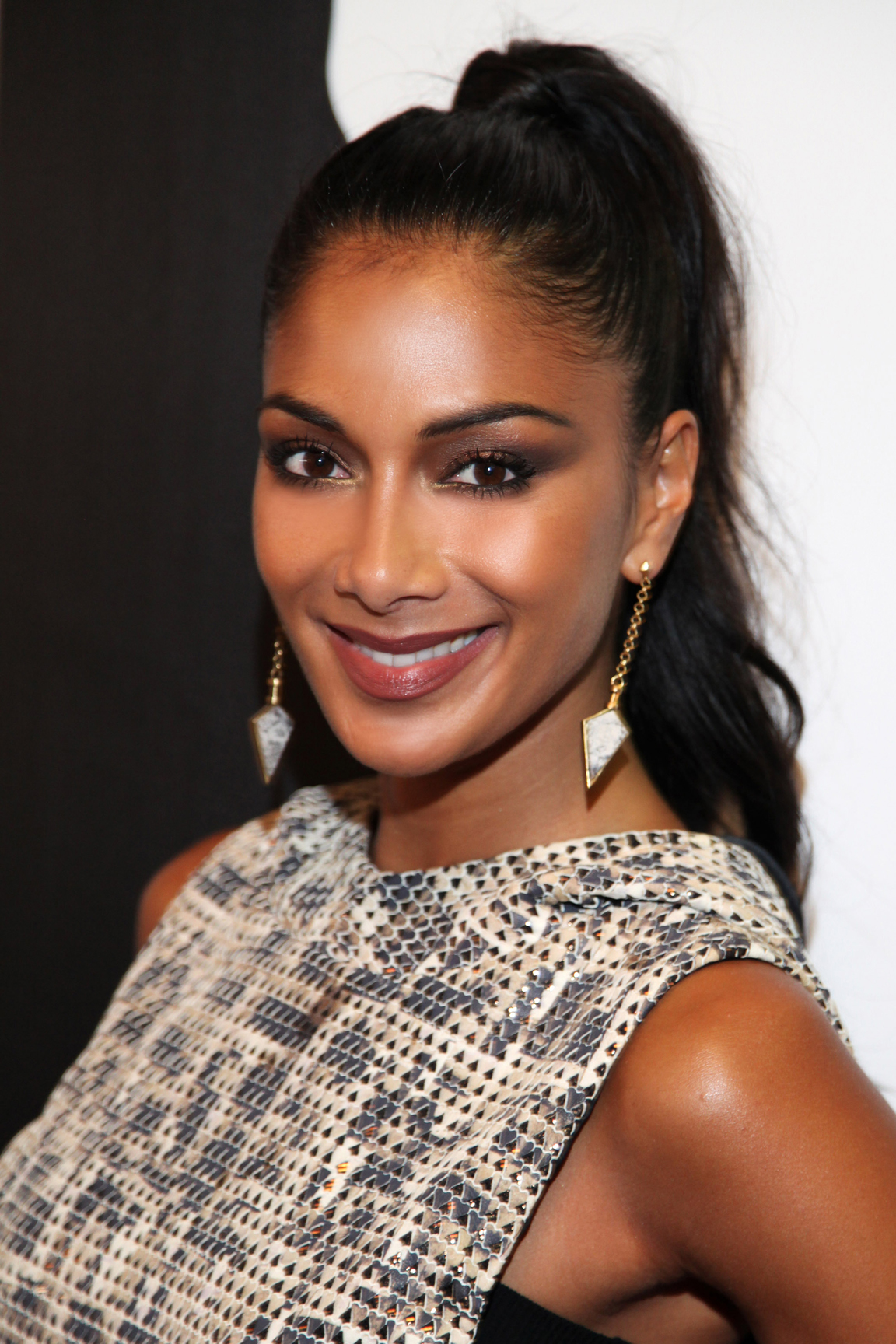
Nicole Scherzinger

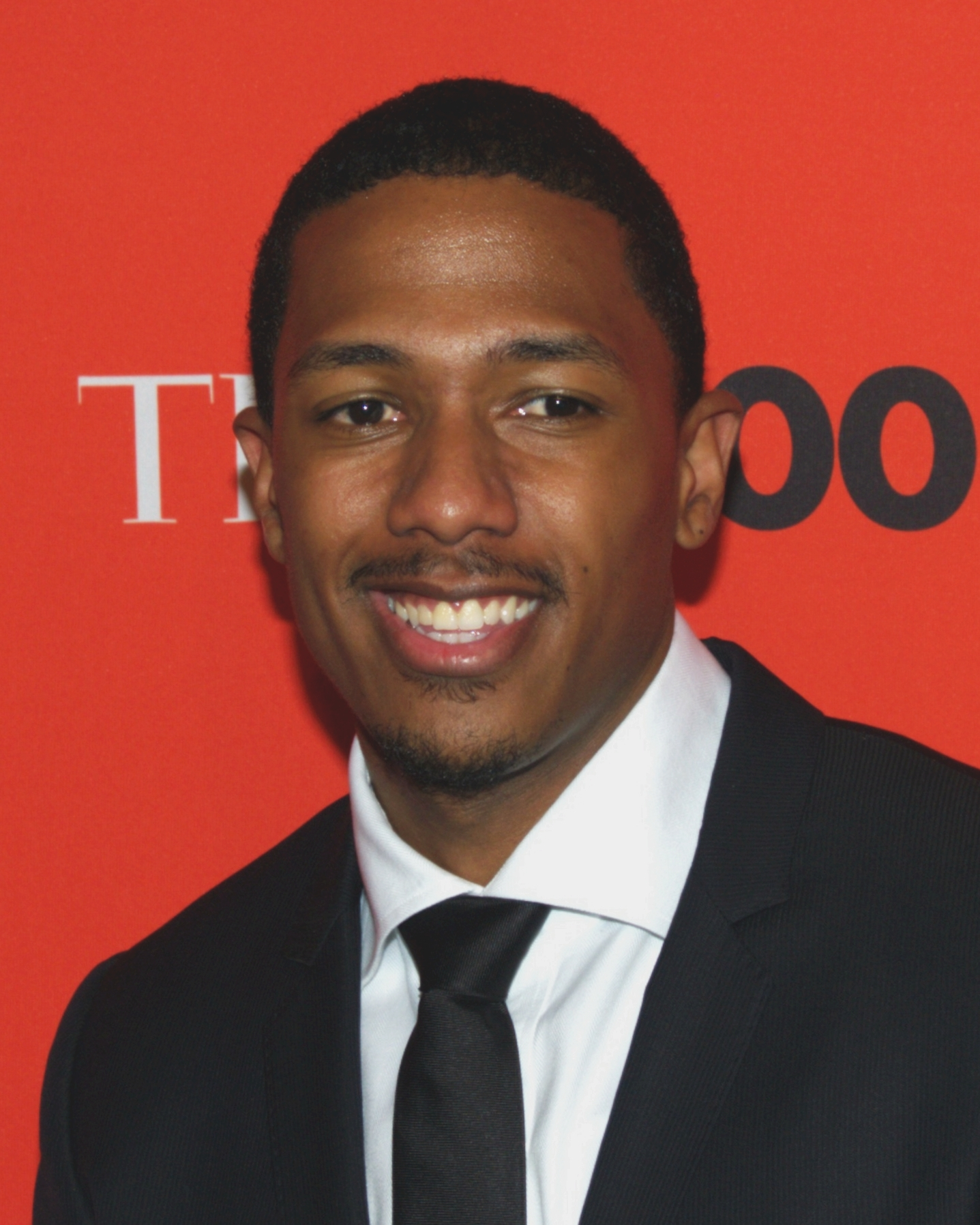
Nick Cannon

Nick Cannon, singer-songwriter Robin Thicke, television and radio personality Jenny McCarthy Wahlberg, actor and comedian Ken Jeong, and recording artist Nicole Scherzinger all return as host and panelists for their tenth consecutive season.

The first episode included David Spade as an additional guest, the second episode included Le'Veon Bell ("Milkshake" from season eight), Antonio Gates, and DeSean Jackson as additional guests, the third episode included season six winner Jewel, Lance Bass, and Kate Flannery as additional guests, the fifth episode included season two finalist Adrienne Bailon-Houghton as an additional guest, the seventh episode included Trolls characters Queen Poppy and Branch as additional guests, the eighth episode included The Trammps and Taylor Dayne ("Popcorn" from season four) as additional guests, the ninth episode included Kelly Osbourne ("Ladybug" from season two) and Bret Michaels ("Banana" from season three) as additional guests, and the tenth episode included Hunter Hayes ("Astronaut" from season three) as an additional guest.

== Production ==
On May 15, 2023, it was announced that the series was renewed for a tenth season. A promo revealing the season's premiere date featured letters inspired by previous costumes. A special preview episode aired on September 10, and featured previous contestants such as Michelle Williams and Rumer Willis, Joey Fatone and Bow Wow, and Victor Oladipo and Barry Zito, as well as a special unmasking.

The format features gimmicks from previous seasons. Smackdowns, which were featured in the second, third, and fourth seasons, returned with four contestants in each group, wild card contestants, which were featured during the fifth and sixth seasons, also return in the second episode of each group, and battle royales, which were featured in the eighth and previous seasons, return in the group finals episodes. Additionally, the "Ding Dong Keep It On" Bell, which was featured in the previous season, returns for the group finals episodes, where the judges can only save one contestant from elimination and move them directly to the finale.

The season also features the return of themed nights, a gimmick introduced in the previous seasons. The season includes themes such as "Trolls Night", "Harry Potter Night", "Elton John", "NFL Night", "One Hit Wonders", "Disco", "2000s Night", "I Wanna Rock", and "Soundtrack to My Life".

== Contestants ==
The season features 16 contestants split across three groups. Group A features five contestants, while Groups B and C feature four contestants. Each group features one wild card contestant who joins the competition during the second episode of their respective group; each culminated in a semi-final episode where one contestant moved on to the season finale. The contestants in this season are reported to have a combined 40 medals, 33 Grammy nominations, seven Hall of Fame awards, three lifetime achievement awards, and over 50 tattoos.

Additionally, a special guest mask known as "Anonymouse" performed during the season kickoff special, who was later revealed to be singer/songwriter and actor, Demi Lovato.

Results
Stage name	Celebrity	Occupation(s)	Episodes										
Stage name	Celebrity	Occupation(s)	1	2	3	4	5	6	7	8	9	10	11
Stage name	Celebrity	Occupation(s)	Group A			Group B		Group C		A	B	C	11
Cow	Ne-Yo	Singer	SAFE	SAFE	SAFE					WIN			WINNER
Donut	John Schneider	Actor/singer						SAFE	SAFE			WIN	RUNNER-UP
Gazelle	Janel Parrish	Actor/singer	SAFE	SAFE	SAFE					KEPT (Note: While in the middle of their unmasking, panelist Ken Jeong used the "Ding Dong Keep It On" bell to save Gazelle from elimination, allowing the portrayer to keep their mask on and continue in the competition.)			THIRD
Sea Queen (WC)	Macy Gray	Singer					SAFE				WIN		FOURTH
Candelabra	Keyshia Cole	Singer						SAFE	SAFE			OUT	
Anteater	John Oates	Musician						RISK	RISK			OUT	
Tiki	Sebastian Bach	Singer/actor				SAFE	RISK				OUT		
Husky	Ginuwine	Singer				SAFE	SAFE				OUT		
S'More	Ashley Parker Angel	Singer	SAFE	SAFE	RISK					OUT			
Cuddle Monster (WC)	Metta World Peace	Former NBA player							OUT				
Hibiscus	Luann de Lesseps	Reality TV personality						OUT					
Hawk	Tyler Posey	Actor/musician				RISK	OUT						
Royal Hen	Billie Jean King	Former tennis player				OUT							
Pickle (WC)	Michael Rapaport	Actor/comedian		SAFE	OUT								
Diver	Tom Sandoval	Reality TV personality	SAFE	OUT									
Rubber Ducky	Anthony Anderson (Note: Anderson previously appeared during the second season as a guest panelist.)	Actor/comedian	OUT										

- WIN The masked singer won with their performance and advanced in the competition.
- KEPT The masked singer was saved from elimination by a panelist using the "Ding Dong Keep It On" bell.
- RISK The masked singer was in the bottom two, but was not eliminated.
- SAFE The masked singer was safe from elimination.
- OUT The masked singer was eliminated from the competition and unmasked.
- The masked singer did not perform.

(WC) This masked singer is a wild card contestant.

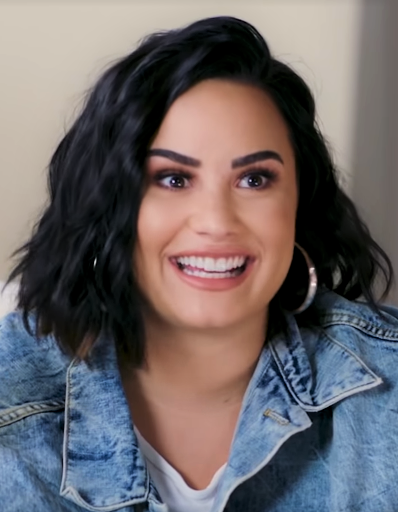
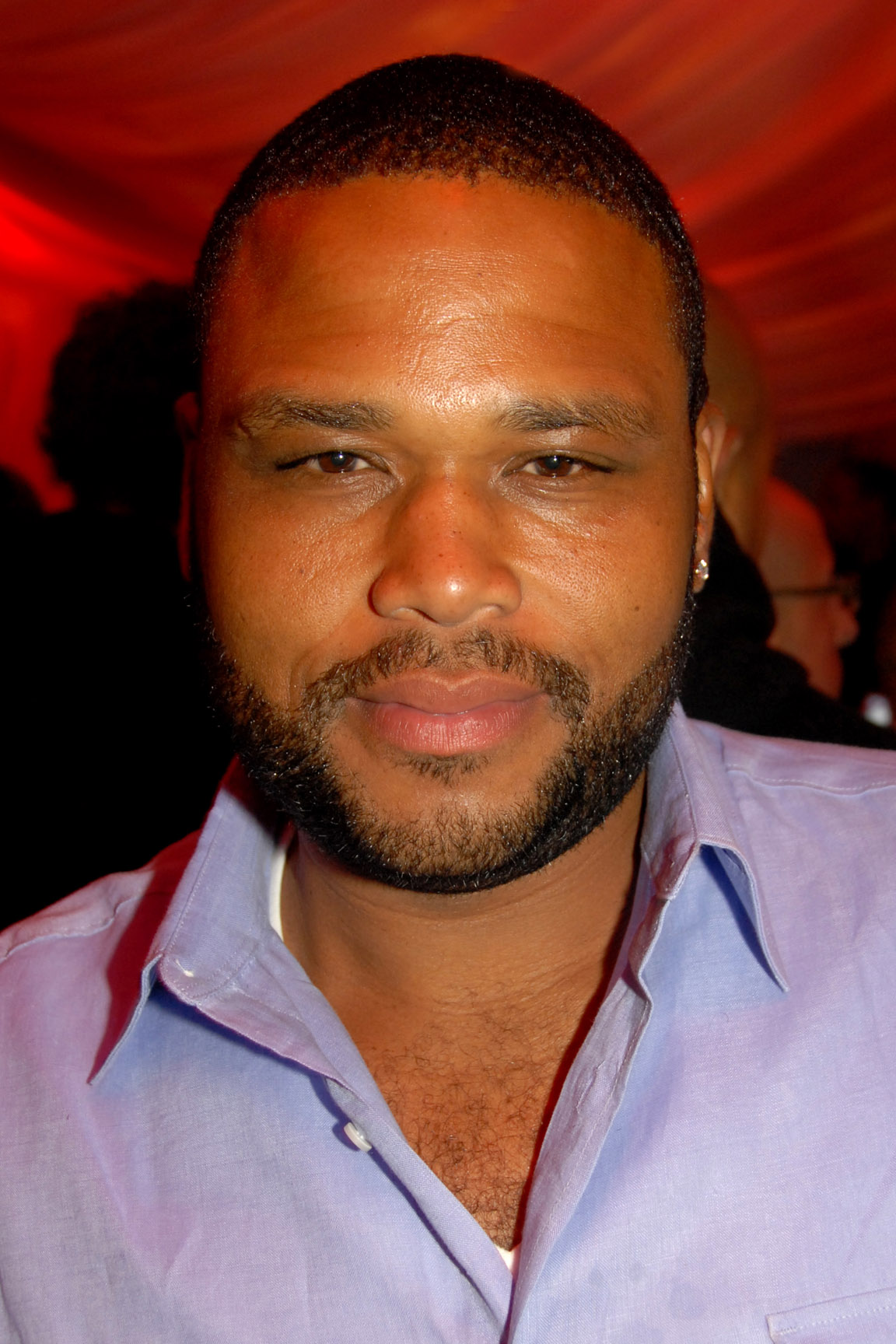
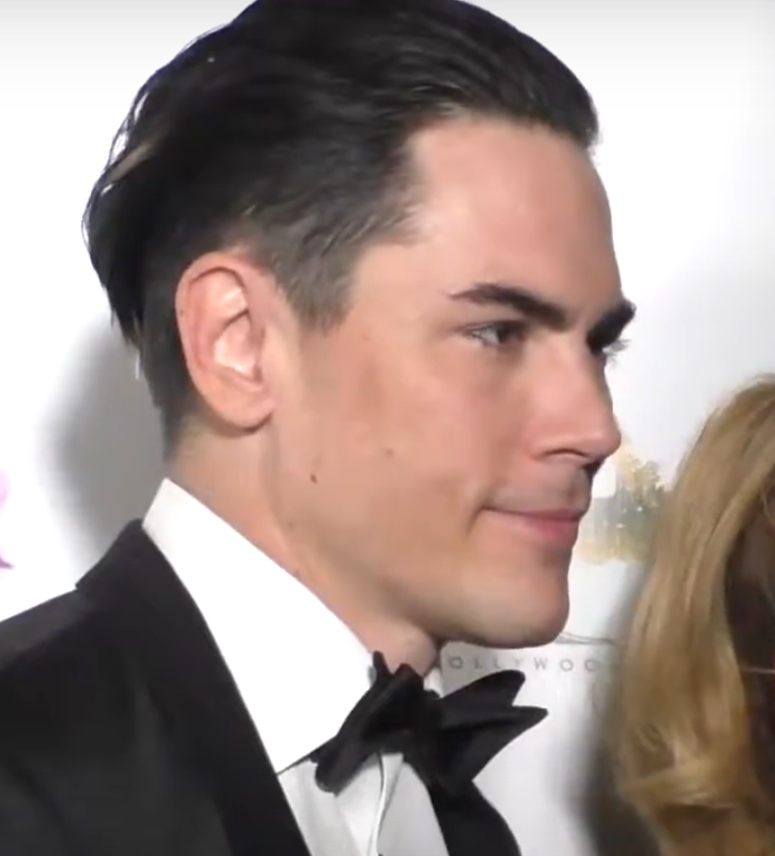
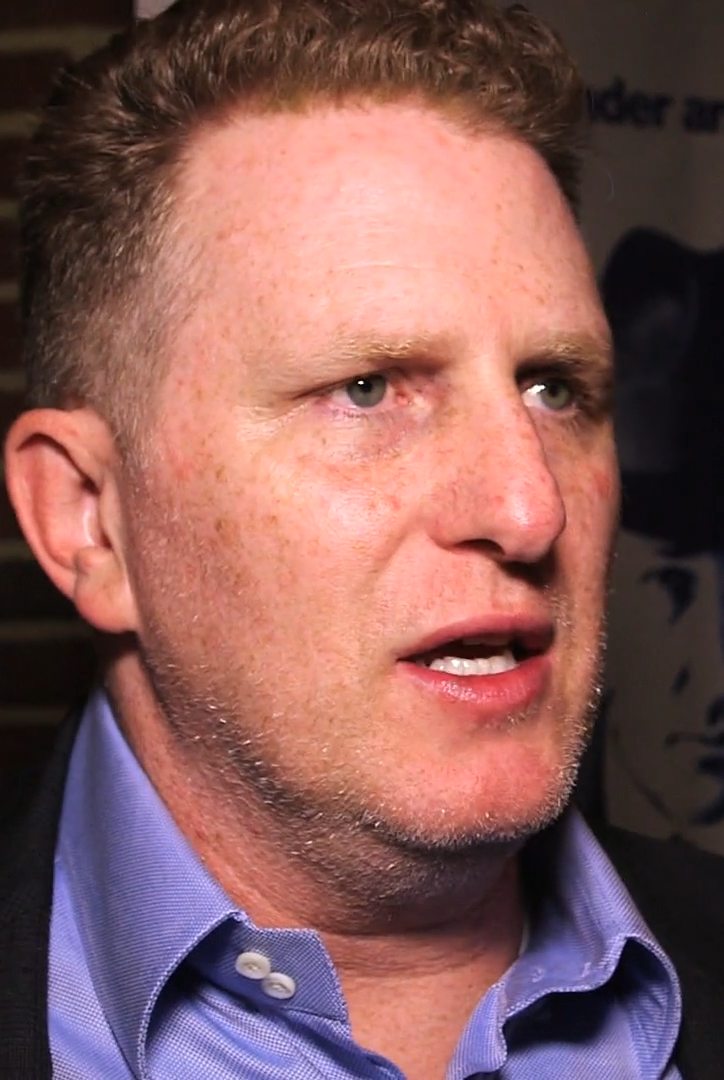
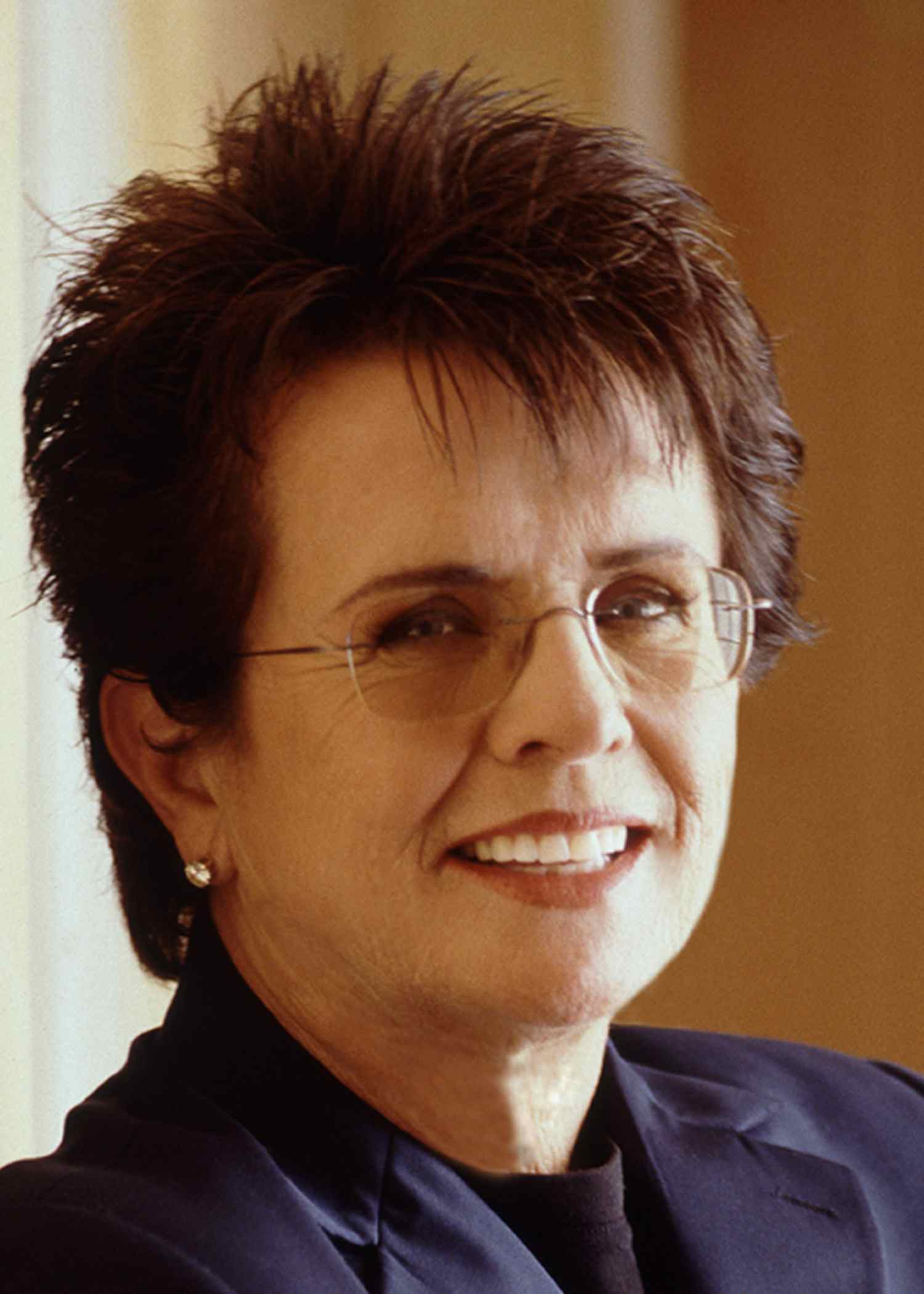
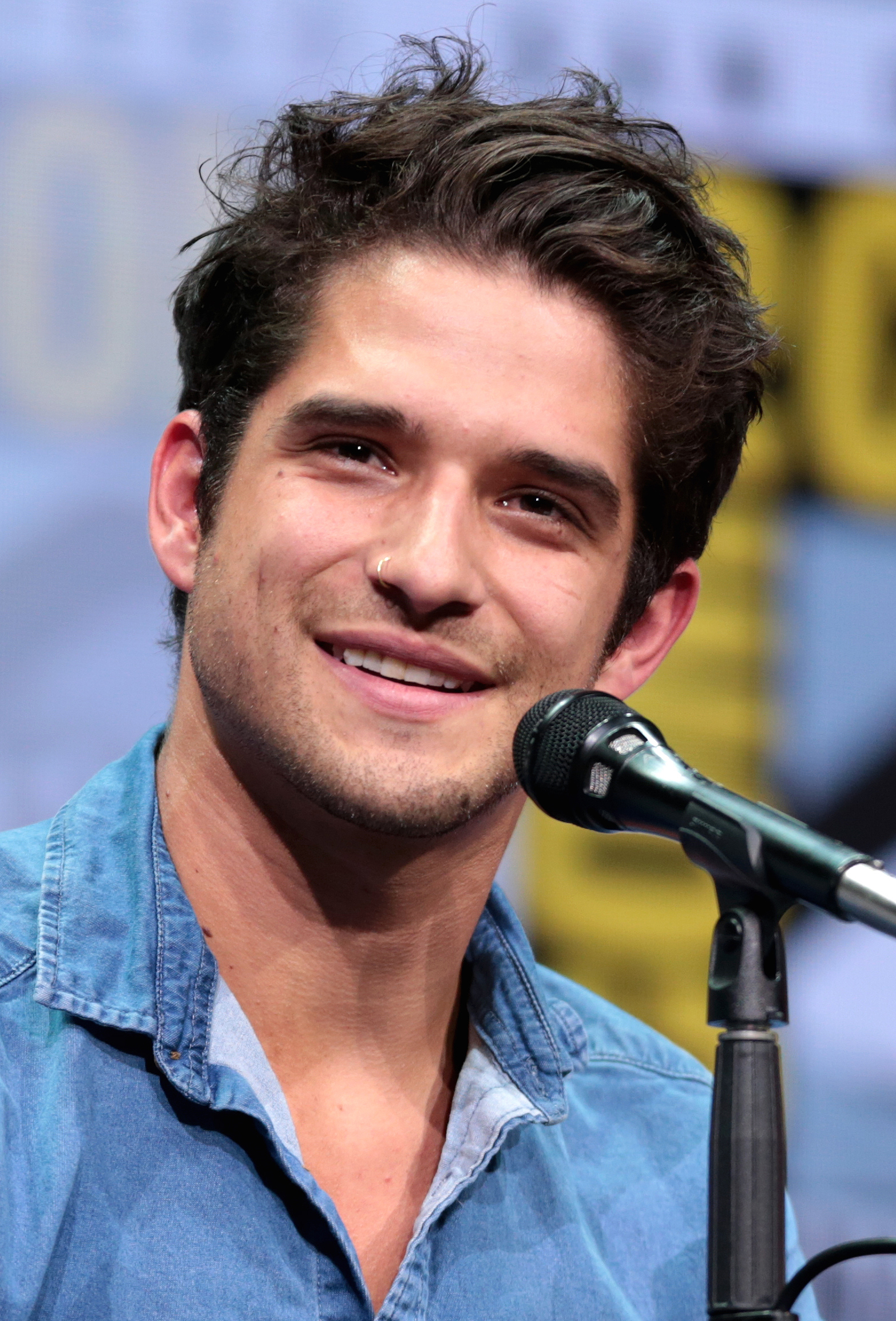
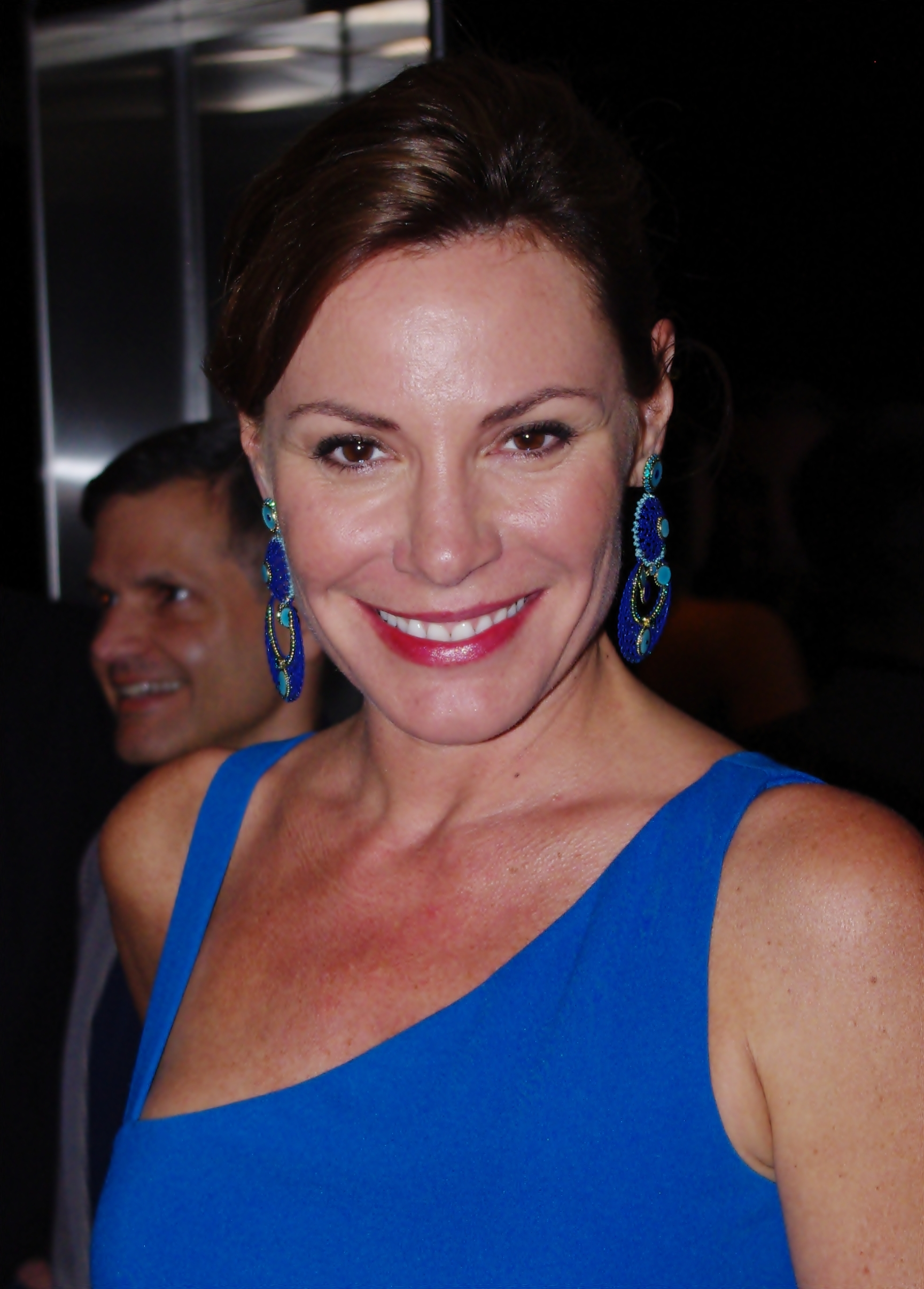
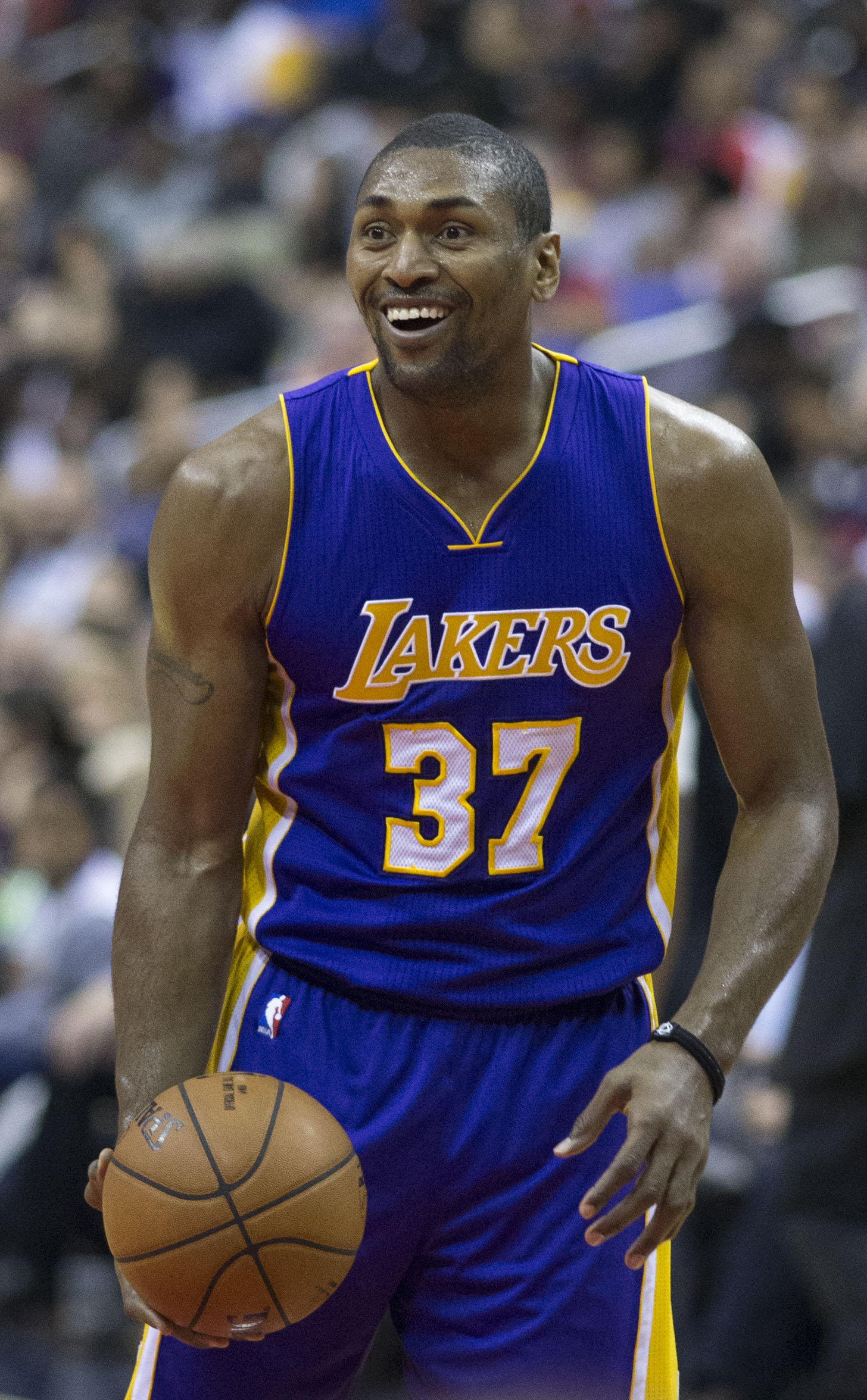
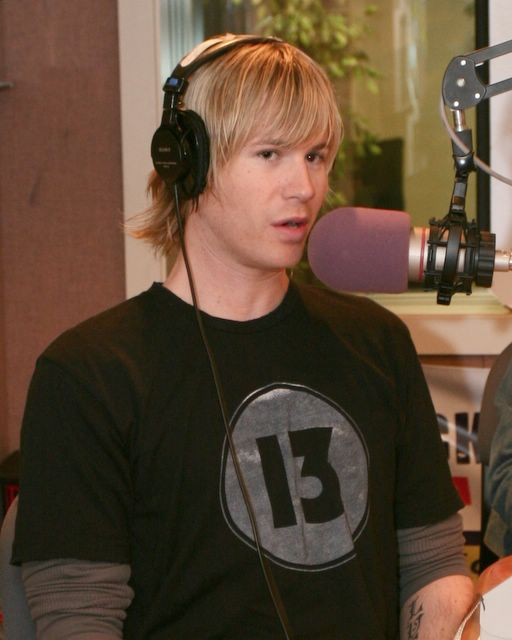
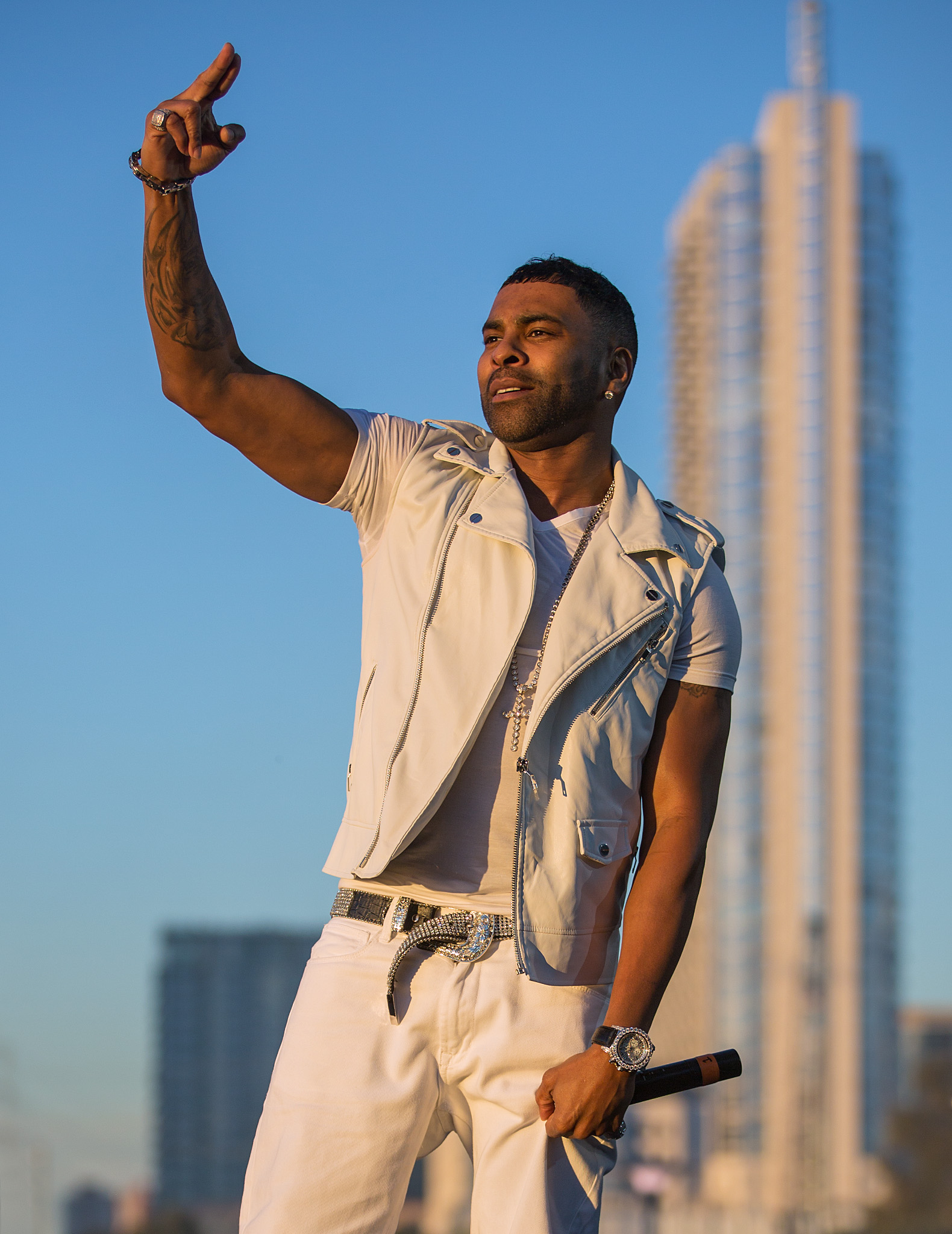
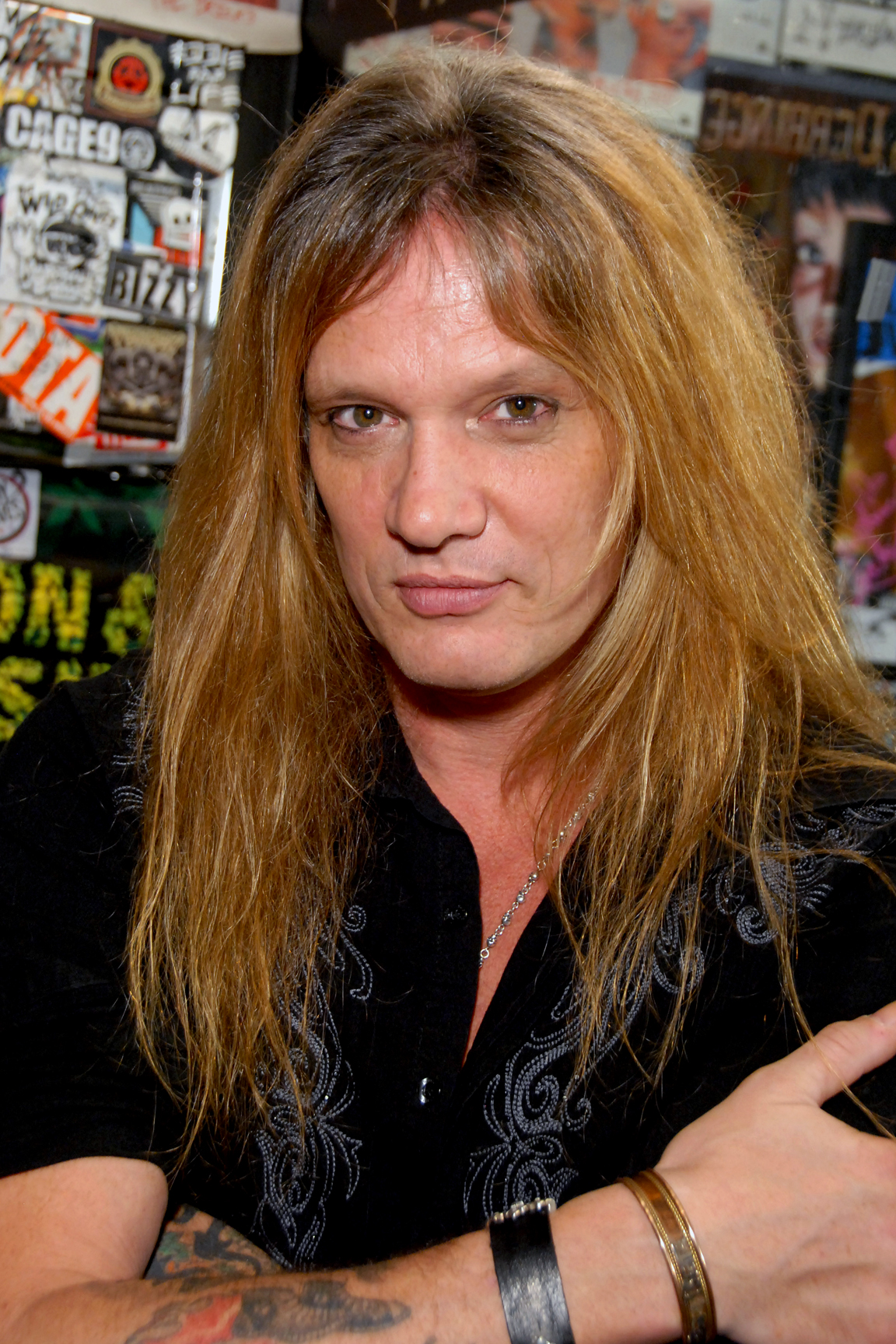
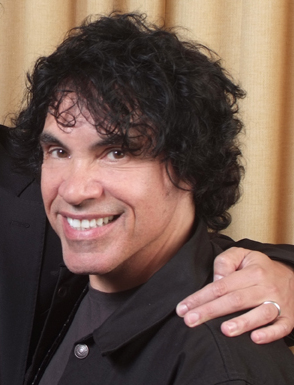
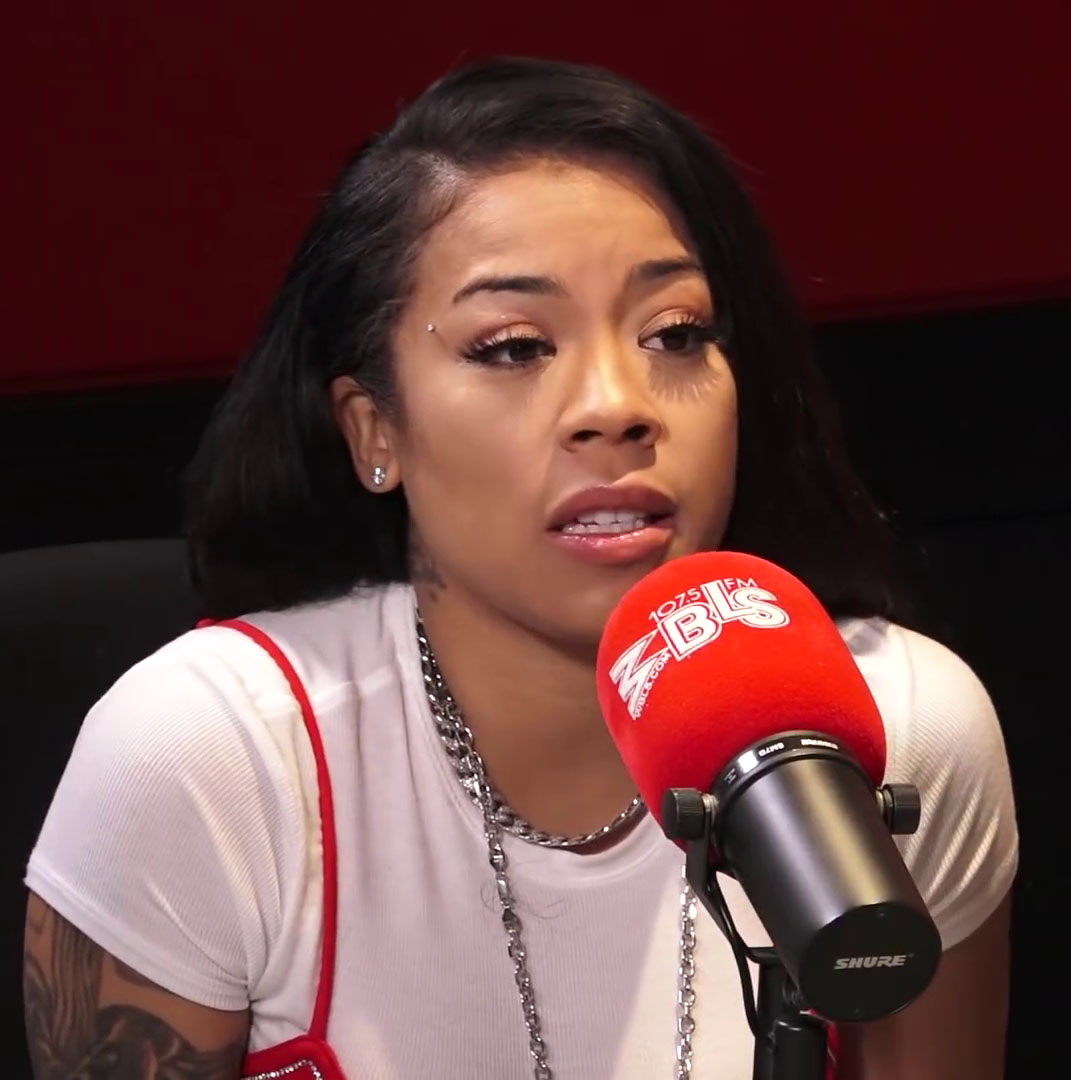
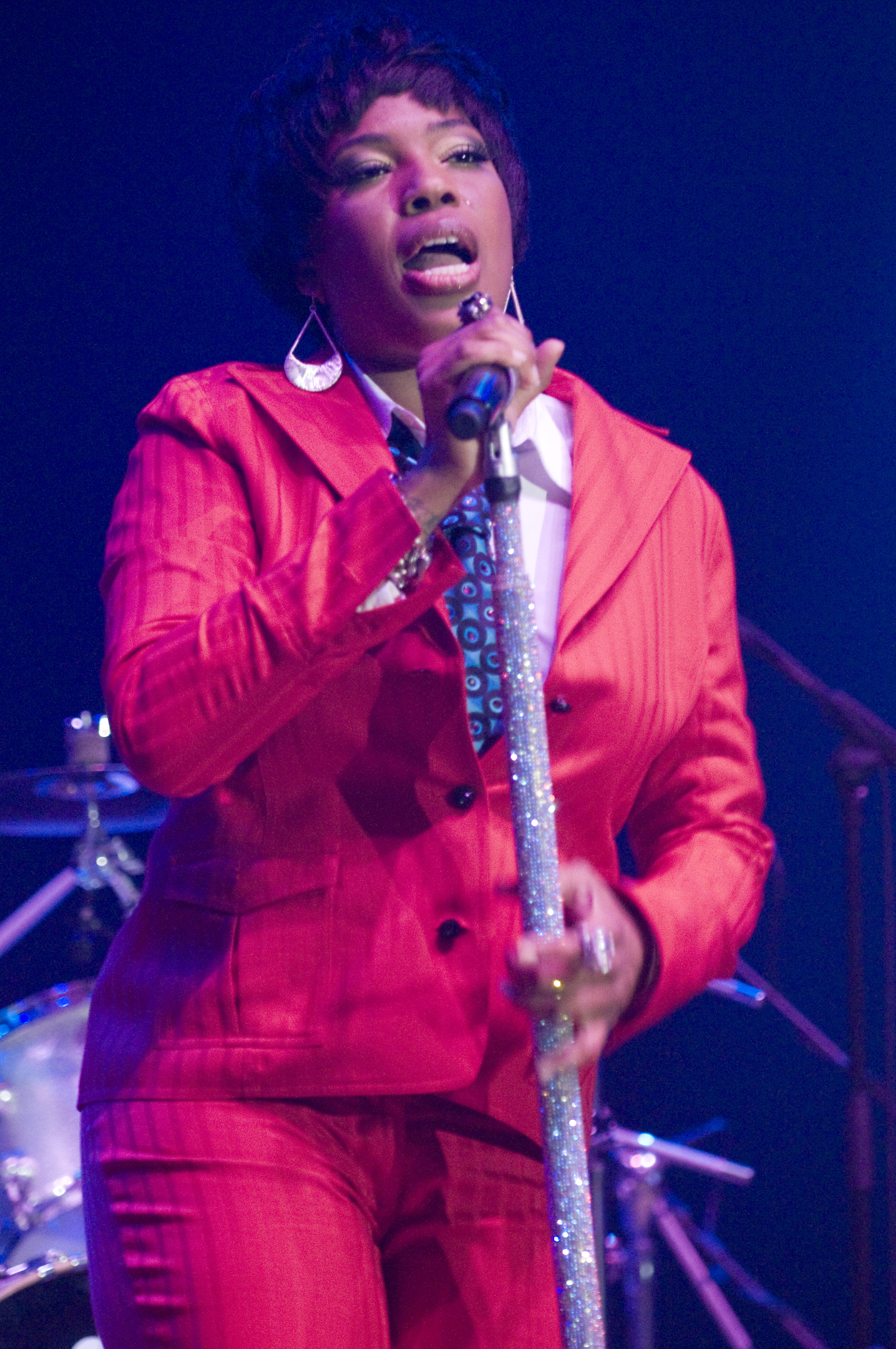
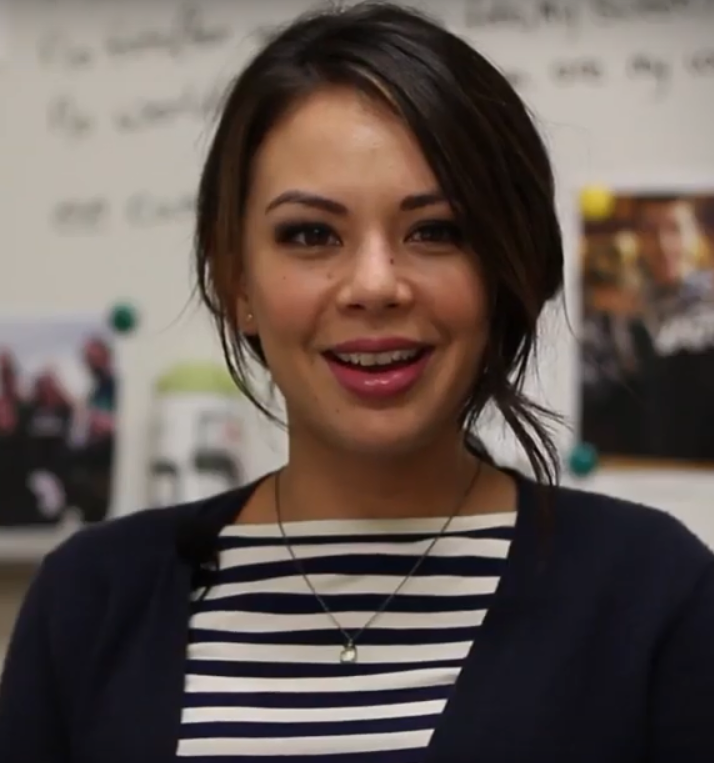
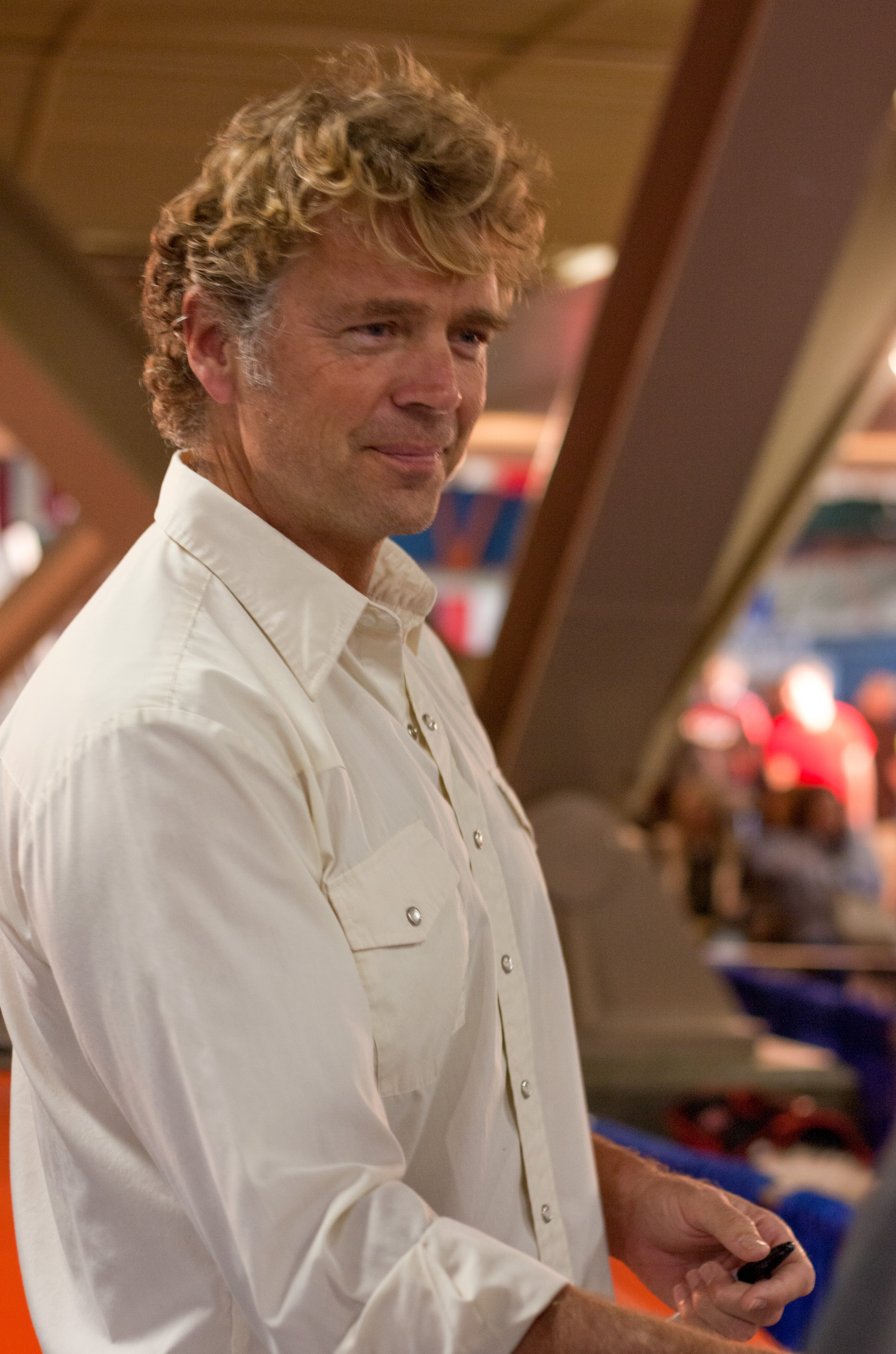
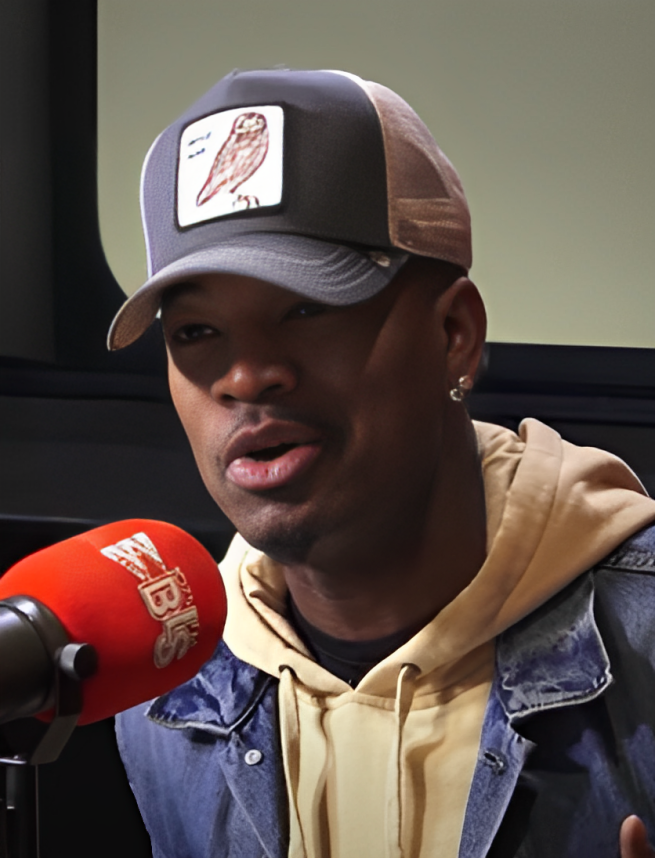
The celebrities who competed in the tenth season of The Masked Singer, pictured in order of elimination (L–R):
Special Guest: Demi Lovato ("Anonymouse"), Anthony Anderson ("Rubber Ducky"), Tom Sandoval ("Diver"), Michael Rapaport ("Pickle"), Billie Jean King ("Royal Hen"), Tyler Posey ("Hawk"), Luann de Lesseps ("Hibiscus"), Metta World Peace ("Cuddle Monster"), Ashley Parker Angel ("S'More"), Ginuwine ("Husky"), Sebastian Bach ("Tiki"), John Oates ("Anteater"), Keyshia Cole ("Candelabra"), Macy Gray ("Sea Queen"), Janel Parrish ("Gazelle"), John Schneider ("Donut"), and Ne-Yo ("Cow")

== Episodes ==
=== "Season 10 Kickoff" - September 10 ===
Performances on the special episode
#	Performer(s)	Song	Identity
1	Anonymouse	"What About Love" by Heart	Demi Lovato
Special performances
2	Rumer Willis and Michelle Williams	"(You Make Me Feel Like) A Natural Woman" by Aretha Franklin	
3	Nicole Scherzinger, Victor Oladipo, and Barry Zito	"Meant to Be" by Bebe Rexha ft. Florida Georgia Line	
4	Joey Fatone and Bow Wow	"ABC" by The Jackson 5	
5	Nicole Scherzinger	"Purple Rain" by Prince	

=== Week 1 (September 27) "Season 10 Premiere" ===
Performances on the first episode
#	Stage name	Song	Identity	Result
1	Gazelle	"Uninvited" by Alanis Morissette	undisclosed	SAFE
2	Diver	"Any Way You Want It" by Journey	undisclosed	SAFE
3	S'More	"Slow Hands" by Niall Horan	undisclosed	SAFE
4	Rubber Ducky	"Come On Eileen" by Dexys Midnight Runners	Anthony Anderson	OUT
5	Cow	"Bones" by Imagine Dragons	undisclosed	SAFE

=== Week 2 (October 4) - "NFL Night" ===
Guest performance: Le'Veon Bell performs "I Gotta Feeling" by Black Eyed Peas

Performances on the second episode
#	Stage name	Song	Identity	Result
1	Cow	"Treasure" by Bruno Mars (from Super Bowl XLVIII)	undisclosed	SAFE
2	Diver	"I Ain't Worried" by OneRepublic (from Super Bowl XLVII pregame NFL tailgate party)	Tom Sandoval	OUT
3	Gazelle	"The One That Got Away" by Katy Perry (from Super Bowl XLIX)	undisclosed	SAFE
4	S'More	"Moves Like Jagger" by Maroon 5 (from Super Bowl LIII)	undisclosed	SAFE
Wild card	Pickle	"Pinball Wizard" by the Who (from Super Bowl XLIV)	undisclosed	SAFE

=== Week 3 (October 11) - "2000s Night" ===
Guest performance: Jewel performs "Standing Still"

Performances on the third episode
#	Stage name	Song	Result	
1	Pickle	"Beverly Hills" by Weezer	RISK	
2	Gazelle	"Lucky" by Britney Spears	SAFE	
3	S'More	"Hey There Delilah" by Plain White T's	RISK	
4	Cow	"Cry Me a River" by Justin Timberlake	SAFE	
Smackdown			Identity	Result
5	Pickle	"Sugar, We're Goin Down" by Fall Out Boy	Michael Rapaport	OUT
5	S'More	"Sugar, We're Goin Down" by Fall Out Boy	undisclosed	SAFE

=== Week 4 (October 18) - "A Celebration of Elton John" ===
Guest performance: Panelist Robin Thicke performs "Tiny Dancer" by Elton John

Performances on the fourth episode
#	Stage name	Elton John song	Result	
1	Hawk	"Saturday Night's Alright for Fighting"	RISK	
2	Husky	"Bennie and the Jets"	SAFE	
3	Royal Hen	"Philadelphia Freedom"	RISK	
4	Tiki	"Goodbye Yellow Brick Road"	SAFE	
Smackdown			Identity	Result
5	Royal Hen	"Don't Go Breaking My Heart" (with Kiki Dee)	Billie Jean King	OUT
5	Hawk	"Don't Go Breaking My Heart" (with Kiki Dee)	undisclosed	SAFE

=== Week 5 (October 25) - "Harry Potter Night" ===
Guest performance: Adrienne Bailon-Houghton performs "I Put a Spell on You" by Screamin' Jay Hawkins

Performances on the fifth episode
#	Stage name	Song	Result	
1	Tiki	"Magic" by Pilot	RISK	
2	Husky	"Super Freak" by Rick James	SAFE	
3	Hawk	"Every Little Thing She Does is Magic" by The Police	RISK	
Wild card	Sea Queen	"Love Potion No. 9" by The Clovers	SAFE	
Smackdown			Identity	Result
5	Tiki	"Monster" by Lady Gaga	undisclosed	SAFE
5	Hawk	"Monster" by Lady Gaga	Tyler Posey	OUT

=== Week 6 (November 8) - "One Hit Wonders Night" ===
Performances on the sixth episode
#	Stage name	Song	Result	
1	Donut	"Hooked on a Feeling" by Blue Swede	SAFE	
2	Hibiscus	"It's Raining Men" by The Weather Girls	RISK	
3	Anteater	"Walking in Memphis" by Marc Cohn	RISK	
4	Candelabra	"1 Thing" by Amerie	SAFE	
Smackdown			Identity	Result
5	Anteater	"Mickey" by Toni Basil	undisclosed	SAFE
5	Hibiscus	"Mickey" by Toni Basil	Luann de Lesseps	OUT

After being unmasked, de Lesseps performed her original song "Money Can't Buy You Class".

=== Week 7 (November 15) - "Trolls Night" ===
Guest performance: Poppy and Branch perform "Better Place" by NSYNC

Performances on the seventh episode
#	Stage name	Song	Result	
1	Anteater	"I Want It That Way" by Backstreet Boys	RISK	
2	Candelabra	"All My Life" by K-Ci & JoJo	SAFE	
3	Donut	"I Do (Cherish You)" by 98 Degrees	SAFE	
Wild card	Cuddle Monster	"You Got It (The Right Stuff)" by New Kids on the Block	RISK	
Smackdown			Identity	Result
5	Cuddle Monster	"Can't Stop the Feeling!" by Justin Timberlake	Metta World Peace	OUT
5	Anteater	"Can't Stop the Feeling!" by Justin Timberlake	undisclosed	SAFE

=== Week 8 (November 29) - "Disco Night" ===
Guest performances: The Trammps perform "Disco Inferno" and Taylor Dayne performs "I Will Survive" by Gloria Gaynor

Performances on the eighth episode
#	Stage name	Song	Identity	Result
1	S'More	"That's the Way (I Like It)" by KC and the Sunshine Band	Ashley Parker Angel	OUT
2	Cow	"Ring My Bell" by Anita Ward	undisclosed	SAFE
3	Gazelle	"On the Radio" by Donna Summer	undisclosed	SAFE
Battle Royale
4	Gazelle	"I Will Survive" by Gloria Gaynor	undisclosed	KEPT
4	Cow	"I Will Survive" by Gloria Gaynor	undisclosed	WIN

After being unmasked, Parker Angel performed O-Town's hit song "All or Nothing".

=== Week 9 (December 6) - "I Wanna Rock" ===
Guest performance: Bret Michaels performs "Nothin' But a Good Time" by Poison

Performances on the ninth episode
#	Stage name	Song	Identity	Result
1	Tiki	"I Was Made for Lovin' You" by Kiss	undisclosed	SAFE
2	Husky	"Always" by Bon Jovi	Ginuwine	OUT
3	Sea Queen	"To Be with You" by Mr. Big	undisclosed	SAFE
Battle Royale
4	Tiki	"Nothin' But a Good Time" by Poison	Sebastian Bach	OUT
4	Sea Queen	"Nothin' But a Good Time" by Poison	undisclosed	WIN

After being unmasked, Ginuwine performed his signature song "Pony" and Bach sang Skid Row's "Youth Gone Wild".

=== Week 10 (December 13) - "Soundtrack to My Life" ===
Guest performance: Hunter Hayes performs "Wanted"

Performances on the tenth episode
#	Stage name	Song	Identity	Result
1	Candelabra	"I'm Goin' Down" by Mary J. Blige	undisclosed	SAFE
2	Anteater	"Johnny B. Goode" by Chuck Berry	John Oates	OUT
3	Donut	"Georgia on My Mind" by Ray Charles	undisclosed	SAFE
Battle Royale
4	Donut	"Wanted" by Hunter Hayes	undisclosed	WIN
4	Candelabra	"Wanted" by Hunter Hayes	Keyshia Cole	OUT

=== Week 11 (December 20) ===
- Group performance: "What I Like About You" by The Romantics

Performances on the eleventh episode
#	Stage name	Song	Identity	Result
Round 1
1	Cow	"Rhythm Nation" by Janet Jackson	undisclosed	SAFE
2	Gazelle	"Chasing Cars" by Snow Patrol	Janel Parrish	THIRD PLACE
3	Sea Queen	"Rescue Me" by Fontella Bass	Macy Gray	FOURTH PLACE
4	Donut	"You Are So Beautiful" by Joe Cocker	undisclosed	SAFE
Round 2
5	Donut	"Drift Away" by Dobie Gray	John Schneider	RUNNER-UP
6	Cow	"Take a Bow" by Rihanna	Ne-Yo	WINNER

After being unmasked, Gray performed her signature song "I Try", and Ne-Yo performed "Miss Independent".

== Ratings ==
Viewership and ratings per episode of The Masked Singer (American TV series) season 10
No.	Title	Air date	Timeslot (ET)	Rating/share (18–49)	Viewers (millions)	Ref.
Special	"Season 10 Kickoff"	September 10, 2023	Sunday 8:00 p.m.	0.9/7	3.98	
1	"Season 10 Premiere"	September 27, 2023	Wednesday 8:00 p.m.	0.5/6	3.22	
2	"NFL Night"	October 4, 2023	Wednesday 8:00 p.m.	0.5/6	3.51	
3	"2000s Night"	October 11, 2023	Wednesday 8:00 p.m.	0.4/4	3.25	
4	"A Celebration of Elton John"	October 18, 2023	Wednesday 8:00 p.m.	0.5/5	3.56	
5	"Harry Potter Night"	October 25, 2023	Wednesday 8:00 p.m.	0.5/5	3.54	
6	"One Hit Wonders Night"	November 8, 2023	Wednesday 8:00 p.m.	0.4/4	3.15	
7	"Trolls Night"	November 15, 2023	Wednesday 8:00 p.m.	0.4/5	3.31	
8	"Disco Night"	November 29, 2023	Wednesday 8:00 p.m.	0.4/4	3.02	
9	"I Wanna Rock"	December 6, 2023	Wednesday 8:00 p.m.	0.4/4	3.20	
Special	"Holiday Sing-along"	December 12, 2023	Tuesday 8:00 p.m.	0.3/3	1.83	
10	"Soundtrack to My Life"	December 13, 2023	Wednesday 8:00 p.m.	0.4/4	2.98	
11	"Season 10 Finale"	December 20, 2023	Wednesday 8:00 p.m.	0.5/6	3.76	
