= Girl Code (song) =

2015 single by Countess Luann

Single by Countess Luann
- Released: July 3, 2015
- Genre: Dance
- Length: 2:59
- Label: Eloli
- Songwriter(s): Luann de Lesseps; Jerry "Wonda" Duplessis; Arden Altino; Angela Ann Hunte; Tzvetin T. Todorov; Urales Vargas
- Producer(s): Jerry "Wonda" Duplessis

Countess Luann singles chronology
"Chic C'est la Vie" (2011)	"Girl Code" (2015)	"Feelin' Jovani" (2019)

"Girl Code" (Note: "Girl Code" has been referred to by the alternative title of "Girl Code (Don't Be So Uncool)".) is a song by American television personality Luann de Lesseps, under the stage name and former courtesy title of Countess Luann. It was released on July 3, 2015, through Eloli Music, as a standalone single. Jerry "Wonda" Duplessis produced the song and co-wrote it with de Lesseps, Arden Altino, Angela Ann Hunte, Tzvetin T. Todorov, and Urales Vargas. Despite having no plans to release new music, de Lesseps was inspired by her fellow The Real Housewives of New York City cast members and convinced by the series' producer Andy Cohen to release a third single.

"Girl Code" is a funk-influenced dance song that features backing vocals from de Lesseps' daughter, Victoria. She premiered the song during an episode of Watch What Happens Live with Andy Cohen, and its lyrics partially reference an argument between de Lesseps and American author Carole Radziwill that occurred while vacationing in the Turks and Caicos Islands. It received mixed reviews from music critics, with E! Online referring to it as a guilty pleasure song.

== Background and release ==
According to Luann de Lesseps, she did not have any plans to release additional music in her career. In 2010, she was signed to Ultra Music, and collaborated with New York City-based musician Chris Young as her producer and co-songwriter. Together, they released "Money Can't Buy You Class" in 2010, and "Chic C'est la Vie" in 2011. Her appearances on The Real Housewives of New York City proved to be a source of inspiration for developing her third single, "Girl Code"; she said in an interview: "I got really inspired... I'm thrilled with it because the song is really different from what I've done before." The series' producer Andy Cohen also helped convince de Lesseps to release a new song. "Girl Code" was written by de Lesseps, Jerry "Wonda" Duplessis, Arden Altino, Angela Ann Hunte, Tzvetin T. Todorov, and Urales Vargas, while production was handled by Duplessis.

de Lesseps premiered "Girl Code" as a live performance on the American late-night talk show Watch What Happens Live with Andy Cohen. The episode, which was broadcast on June 23, 2015, featured both de Lesseps and Real Housewives co-star Sonja Morgan; During the appearance, de Lesseps answered a fan's phone-in question regarding the song's subject matter and title: "I think every woman can understand what that means. When you break the girl code, when you cross the line, and you just do something that is – you know – unforgivable unless someone apologizes." The song was released on July 3, 2015, when it was distributed for digital download and streaming through Eloli Music. Some publications have referred to the song by the alternative title "Girl Code (Don't Be So Uncool)". A music video for the song was filmed during the last week of June 2015.

== Music and lyrics ==
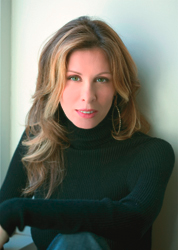
"Girl Code" was partially inspired by de Lesseps' feud with author Carole Radziwill (pictured in 2007).

"Girl Code" is a funk-influenced dance song. de Lesseps' daughter, Victoria, provides backing vocals. Dave Quinn and Jessica Fecteau, writers from People, both noted the song's girl power theme, with the former calling it funky.

Lyrically, "Girl Code" refers to a moment in de Lesseps' life where she felt betrayed by her friends. While vacationing with the Real Housewives cast in the Turks and Caicos Islands, she took issue with some members, specifically author Carole Radziwill, for entering a relationship with the former boyfriend of de Lesseps' niece. Specifying, de Lesseps revealed to E! Online that "Girl Code" is not entirely about just one incident, but rather "how friends have to look out for each other" and what happens when they do not. One of the lyrics references a catchphrase de Lesseps coined during the trip ("Don't be all, like, uncool"). In the chorus, "I'm just doing me / You broke the girl code / So don't be so uncool / I gotta let you go", Ben Rimalower from Vulture felt she expresses her want of "support and company" from her friendships.

== Critical reception ==
Chris Harnick from E! Online referred to "Girl Code" as a guilty pleasure song. Bustle's Kristie Rohwedder ranked de Lesseps' first three singles, and provided the lowest score to "Girl Code"; however, she enjoyed its lyrics, danceability, and catchiness. Lynsey Eidell of Glamour encouraged her readers to listen to the song "if only for a chuckle".

Retrospectively, Sadie Gennis from TV Guide Magazine listed "Girl Code" as the tenth best Real Housewives song in a 2017 article. She called the song nonsense and said Victoria de Lesseps' feature was the best part of the song. In a similar 2019 list by People, Quinn listed it as the franchise's 18th best song, and labeled it as "a banger".

== Track listing ==
Digital download/streaming
No.	Title	Length
1.	"Girl Code"	2:59

== Release history ==
Release dates and formats for "Girl Code"
Region	Date	Format(s)	Label	Ref.
Various	July 3, 2015	Digital download; streaming	Eloli	
