= Girl Code (disambiguation) =

Girl Code is a comedy television series.

Girl Code may also refer to:

- "Girl Code" (song), a 2015 song by Luann de Lesseps
- Girl Code (album), a 2018 album by City Girls
- "The Girl Code", an episode from the twenty-seventh season of The Simpsons
- Female bonding

== See also ==
- Girls Who Code, a nonprofit organization supporting women in computer science
- CodeGirl, a 2015 documentary film
- Ladies' Code, a South Korean girl group
