= What Do I Want for Christmas? =

2021 single by Countess Luann

Single by Countess Luann
- Released: November 12, 2021
- Recorded: 2020
- Genre: Christmas
- Length: 2:21
- Label: Self-released
- Songwriters: Bruce Roberts; Billy Stritch
- Producers: Bruce Roberts; Billy Stritch

Countess Luann singles chronology
"Viva la Diva" (2020)	"What Do I Want for Christmas?" (2021)	"F-Bombs on the G with the OG's" (2021)

Music video
- "What Do I Want for Christmas?" on YouTube

"What Do I Want for Christmas?" is a charity song recorded by American television personality Luann de Lesseps, under the stage name and former courtesy title of Countess Luann. It was written and produced by Bruce Roberts and Billy Stritch and released as a single on November 12, 2021, with digital proceeds benefiting the Fortune Society. The song's recording process was partially documented on episodes of The Real Housewives of New York City, where de Lesseps invited her fellow cast members Ramona Singer, Sonja Morgan, Leah McSweeney, and Eboni K. Williams to record guest verses for the track.

In most reviews of the song, critics did not take "What Do I Want for Christmas?" seriously, and comparisons to Mariah Carey's holiday releases were jokingly made. A music video featuring the Real Housewives was also released, with the cast members shown dancing and singing with de Lesseps. The song has since been featured on the set list to de Lesseps' touring holiday-themed variety show, A Very Countess Christmas.

== Background and release ==
The ideation and recording process of "What Do I Want for Christmas?" was documented on various episodes of the thirteenth season of the American reality television series The Real Housewives of New York City, of which de Lesseps was a primary cast member. The song was recorded during the winter months of 2020, and would not released until the following holiday season, after the episodes it appears on had aired. de Lesseps' co-star Leah McSweeney's concern with potential legal issues following the release of the song was also discussed on the series and served as a point of contention between herself and de Lesseps. Ultimately, McSweeney recorded lines for the song, following de Lesseps' decision to have the song's proceeds benefit a charity and cast member Eboni K. Williams opining that no issues would arise regarding a charitable matter. de Lesseps donated digital sales of the song to the Fortune Society.

The single was distributed for download and streaming on November 12, 2021, when de Lesseps self-released the song to digital music platforms, her first commercial release since appearing on "Viva la Diva" with Desmond Child the year prior.

== Composition and lyrics ==
"What Do I Want for Christmas?" is a Christmas song written and produced by Bruce Roberts and Billy Stritch. Its lyrics make references to de Lesseps' touring cabaret show and friendships with the Real Housewives cast mates, amongst others; she told People in an interview: "It's just light and cheerful, and of course, it's all about my relationship with the women, my relationship with the world, my love of cabaret, so it feels really [like] a lot of fun". The entire season 13 cast of McSweeney, Williams, Ramona Singer, and Sonja Morgan all provide guest verses on the songs, which de Lesseps explained was "so [that] nobody could bitch at me" if they were excluded from the effort.

== Reception and promotion ==
"What Do I Want for Christmas?" was not taken seriously by most critics. In Louis Staples' Vulture ranking of Real Housewives singles, he ranked de Lesseps' Christmas song in second-to-last place out of 36 titles, adding that "just like [the show's] thirteenth season, this song is not something fans will be holding on to any time soon." People's Dory Jackson joked that with "What Do I Want for Christmas?", "de Lesseps is giving Mariah Carey a run for her money this holiday season." In a review of the Real Housewives episode "Baby, It's Cold Outside" where the cast recording the song is shown, Brian Moylan from Vulture wrote about each of the guest features on the "middling" single: "Ramona proves to us that she is not only tone deaf when it comes to the remarks she makes in polite conversation, but also even in the simplest of holiday sing-alongs. Sonja has a great time performing but can’t remember the very simple lyrics to the song because Sonja cannot be scripted. Eboni comes by and hopes that no one thinks she is Whitney Houston, which no one does because Eboni’s still alive." He also joked that the song was a "rip-off of 'All I Want for Christmas Is Koosh (Balls)'".

The music video for "What Do I Want for Christmas?" premiered the same day of the single's release. It features de Lesseps with her fellow cast members "dressed to the nines as they sing and dance around together". In 2023, de Lesseps performed "What Do I Want for Christmas?" during the dates of her touring holiday-themed variety show, A Very Countess Christmas.

== Release history ==
Release dates and formats for "What Do I Want for Christmas?"
Region	Date	Format(s)	Label	Ref.
Various	November 12, 2021	Digital download; streaming	Self-released	
