= 1974 Ethiopian Muslim protests =

Protest against Emperor Haile Selassie regime

- Part of Opposition to Haile Selassie
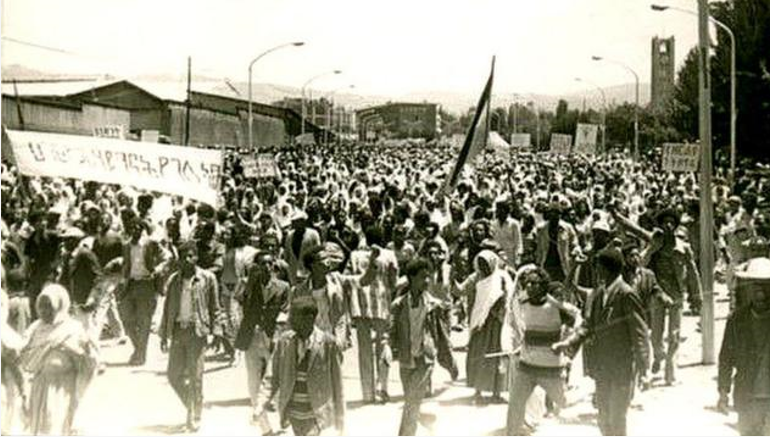
- Ethiopian Muslims rally held in 1974
- Date: 20 April 1974
- Location: Addis Ababa, Ethiopia
- Caused by: Discrimination against the Muslim populace
- Goals: Reforms, demands for equal opportunity
- Methods: Civil resistance, demonstrations, protest marches, picketing
- Result: Muslim leaders hold meeting with Prime minister Endelkachew Makonnen: Haile Selassie government eventually overthrown; New transitional Derg government agrees to some demands from the Muslim Committee

Parties
Muslim Committee: Protestors	Government of Ethiopia: (Ethiopian Empire) Ethiopian Imperial regime

Lead figures
Ahmed Kellow; Ababiya Abajobir and others ...	Haile Selassie; Endelkachew Makonnen

The 1974 Ethiopian Muslim protests, was a protest against the Haile Selassie regime that occurred on Saturday, April 20, 1974. Protestors denounced the government for marginalizing the Muslim community and called for reforms. It was the largest protest ever held at the time since the countries formation, an estimated 100,000 people participated including some Christians who showed solidarity.

== Background ==
The Muslim populace in Ethiopia endured inequality; politically, socially and economically. Historical Muslim leaders who governed Ethiopia for more than a decade such as Ahmad ibn Ibrahim al-Ghazi were disparaged, and Muslim status in the country was portrayed as foreign rather than indigenous by the high society.

Historian Ahmed Jemal, relates a common Amharic saying directed towards Muslims included:

The abode of the bird is on the tree (Warka);
The homeland of a Muslim is Mecca. (Saudi Arabia)

Political analyst Stephen R. Goodwin states that since the foundation of Ethiopia by Menelik II, Muslim Ethiopians had been considered inferior to their Christian counterparts in the country, and their status was akin to that of the Calipahte's treatment of non Muslims under the Dhimmi system. They had only received brief respite during the reign of Iyasu V and later through the Italians who occupied Ethiopia from 1936 to 1941. The Haile Selassie regime however upon returning to power revoked these rights granted by Italy leading to discontent.

== Protests ==
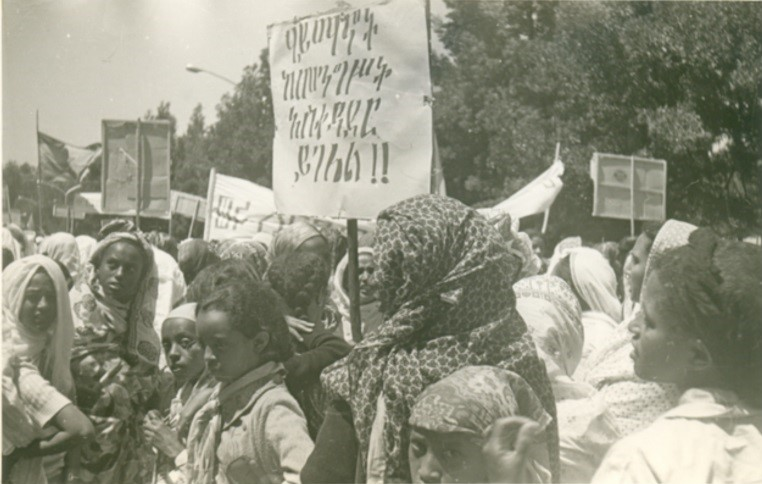
Women protestors seen at the Ethiopian Muslim rally of 1974

In April 1974, the rally was spearheaded by the Muslim committee leaders which included Dr. Ahmed Kellow, and Ababiya Abajobir among others. Protestors had several demands from the Haile Selassie regime which involved insistence on equal rights with Christians, and promotion of the three Muslim religious celebrations; Eid al-Adha, Eid al-Fitr and Mawlid as statutory holidays. A list of grievances that should be addressed were lodged at the state.

According to historian Temesgen Baye, one of the placards at the rally read:

Equality is the basis of unity!
We cannot afford to remain second class citizens!
We demand for equal participation in administration!
Out of 14 Enderasies, none of them is a Muslim!
Out of 20 ministers only two are Muslims! No Muslim is a General!
Our demand is equality, not superiority!
The constitution discriminates against the majority of the population! Ethiopia is not only a Christian island!
We are too Ethiopians! Declare Secular state!
Liberty, equality and fraternity!
Men are born free and equal rights!

Prime minister of Ethiopia at the time Endelkachew Makonnen would respond positively to the protestors and arranged a meeting with Muslim leaders however it didn't bear much success aside from a symbolic gesture from the state.

== Aftermath ==
The rally held in 1974 by Ethiopian Muslims was one of the key events that led to the eventual overthrow of emperor Haile Selassie, and the incoming transitional government led by the Derg would go onto grant some of the rights requested by the Muslim community.
