= Alexandre de Lesseps =

French entrepreneur

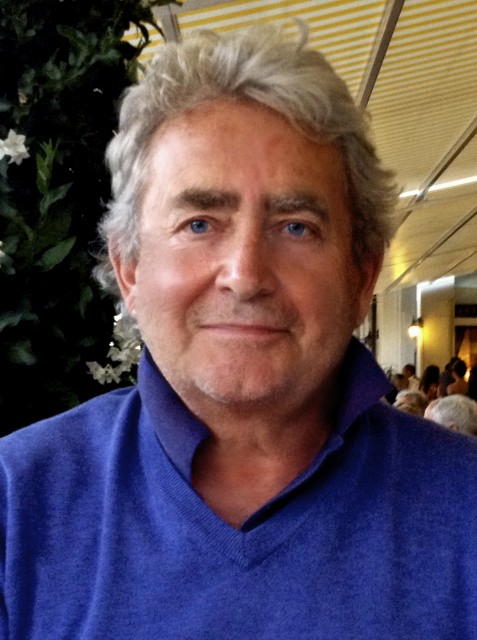
- de Lesseps in 2011
- Born: c. 9 July 1949 (age 76); Paris, France
- Spouse: Isabella Pakenham-Smith Luann Nadeau (m. 1993; div. 2009)
- Issue: Noel de Lesseps; Victoria de Lesseps
- Occupation: Entrepreneur

Alexandre de Lesseps (born c. 1949/1950) is a French entrepreneur and pioneer of microfinancing within developing countries. He currently serves as President of Pandaw Investment Holdings of Hong Kong, focusing on investments in Myanmar. Previously, until 2013, he held the position of chairman at Coral Capital Group and was one of the founder investors in the rebuilt Saratoga Hotel in Havana, Cuba. In 2012, he assumed the role of director at Leopard Capital, a private equity firm specializing in investments in Cambodia, Haiti, and various other frontier markets. De Lesseps was also co-founder and Director of Blue Orchard Finance S.A. of Geneva, a leading microfinance management company.

== Early life ==
Alexandre de Lesseps was born in Paris, France. His education took place in Khartoum, Sudan and in France and at Northwestern University in Evanston, Illinois.

== Career ==
De Lesseps's film career started while serving in the French military, where he was enrolled in the film department. He later become a producer of TV films with TelFrance in Paris, Inter Tel in Munich and Telvetia in Switzerland. He became the CEO of Intertel USA Inc and Tanit Productions, in Los Angeles, in 1984. Alexandre de Lesseps founded the company Les Laboratoires de I’Atlantique in 1986, which is a French personal care manufacturer. During the 1980s, his growing interest in emerging markets led him to become the manager of a private equity fund in Asia.

In 1988 he founded The Myanmar Children Association MCA with his partner Mark Tippetts and their friend Ricardo Sicre. MCA has built a 100-pupil school in Kakku, in the Pa-O country in the Shan plateau east of Taunggyi, the capital of Shan State. In 1999, MCA built the first modern maternity clinic beside the school in Kakku. In 2001, MCA completed its first orphanage for boys above the village of Main Thauk, Lake Inle. Built on 11 acres of land with panoramic views across the Lake, the Orphanage sits on the historic site of the first British encampment in the Shan States, Fort Stedman built in 1860. Over 50 boys reside at the Orphanage, and attend the high school in Main Thauk. In 2002, MCA held the grand opening of its second orphanage where 60 girls now live. MCA fully supports the advanced education of ten of these girls on an ongoing basis at Taunggyi University. In addition MCA has sponsored another orphanage on Lake Inle in the nearby village of Mee Thwe Pote, and also funds all the overheads of the Day-Care Center in the village of Main Thauk.

== Award ==
De Lesseps received the Fulbright Humanitarian Award in 2004 at the United Nations in New York.

== Personal life ==
He is a descendant of Ferdinand de Lesseps, the French diplomat and entrepreneur who built the Suez Canal and started the Panama Canal. His fourth wife was Luann de Lesseps, born Nadeau, an American television personality and former fashion model, with whom he has two children, Noël and Victoria.
