= Victoria de Lesseps =

French-American artist

- Born: November 21, 1994 (age 31)
- Noble family: De Lesseps
- Father: Count Alexandre de Lesseps
- Mother: LuAnn Nadeau
- Occupation: Artist

Victoria Diana Peach de Lesseps (born November 1994) is a French-American contemporary visual artist, television personality, and socialite.

== Early life and education ==
De Lesseps was born in Southampton, New York in 1994. She is the daughter of Alexandre de Lesseps, a businessman, and Luann de Lesseps, an American reality television personality and socialite. Through her father, she is related to Suez Canal promoter Ferdinand de Lesseps. She is of French-Canadian descent on her mother's side. Victoria and her brother Noel were raised in between Manhattan, New York, Suffolk County, New York, and Switzerland.

De Lesseps attended Miss Porter's School, a private school in Farmington, Connecticut, and the Ross School, a private school in East Hampton, New York. In 2016, she received a Bachelor of Fine Arts degree in communication design from Pratt Institute.

== Career ==
De Lesseps works as an artist, and her work has been featured on Bravo TV's reality television series The Real Housewives of New York. She also made frequent appearances on the show, although not a member of the cast. She has also collaborated with her brother, Noel de Lesseps, who is also an artist. While enrolled at the Pratt Institute, she worked as an intern for the painter David Salle. A painter and multimedia visual artist, she produces collages, photography, fashion design illustrations, silkscreens and paintings. Her work has also been exhibited at the DKNY Gallery Show in 2014, the Milk and Night Gallery Show in 2016, and at Anderson Contemporary and Solomon Arts Contemporary in 2017. Her artwork was exhibited at Art Basel's 2015 show and 2019 show in Miami. In 2016 her work was shown as part of The Untitled Space's exhibit In the Raw: The Female Gaze on the Nude.

In 2018, De Lesseps began working for fashion designer Nicole Miller. In September 2018, she assisted in the production of Miller's 2019 Spring/Summer show at New York Fashion Week.

== Personal life ==
On April 7, 2017 she was arrested for driving under the influence of alcohol in Sag Harbor, New York. She was initially pulled over for driving without using headlights. She was released the following morning without bail, and was due to appear in court on May 5, 2017.

De Lesseps, along with her father and brother, filed a lawsuit against her mother in 2018 which claimed that she had sold the family's Bridgehampton, New York home and used the proceeds to purchase a new home in Sag Harbor. The Bridgehampton home, valued at $8 million, was to be sold and the money put into a trust fund for De Lesseps and her brother, per the terms of their parents' divorce. In 2019 the lawsuit was dropped and the family reconciled.
