= Luann de Lesseps =

American reality television personality

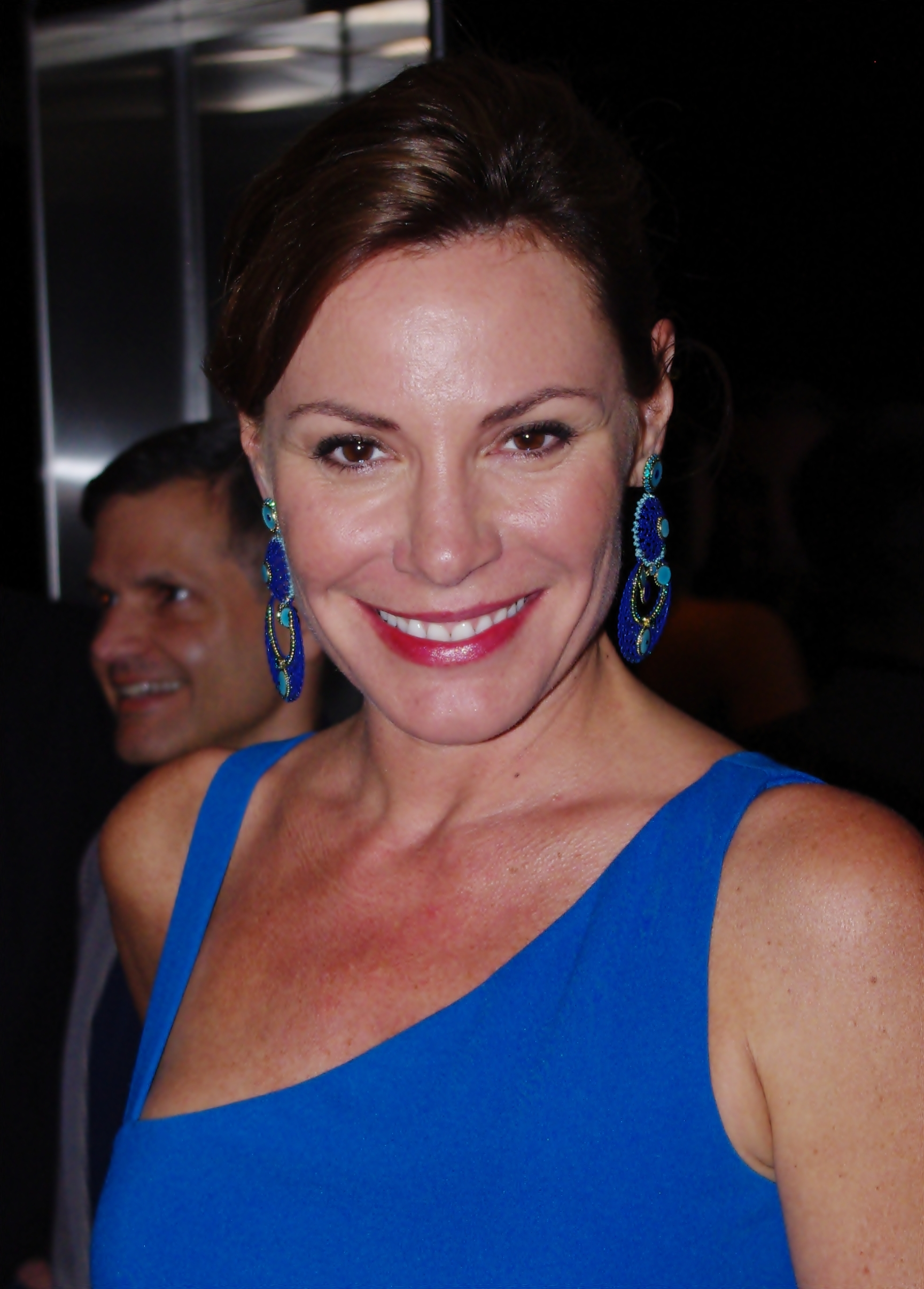
- de Lesseps in New York in 2011
- Born: LuAnn Nadeau; May 17, 1965 (age 61); Berlin, Connecticut, U.S.
- Other name: Countess Luann
- Occupations: Television personality; singer; model; licensed practical nurse; author
- Television: The Real Housewives of New York City
- Spouses: Alexandre de Lesseps (m. 1993; div. 2009) Thomas D’Agostino Jr. (m. 2016; div. 2017)
- Children: 2, including Victoria de Lesseps
- Website: www.countessluann.com

Luann de Lesseps (née Nadeau; formerly "Countess Luann de Lesseps" from her first marriage; born May 17, 1965) is an American television personality, singer, and former model. She is best known as an original cast member of the Bravo reality television series The Real Housewives of New York City, featuring in the first 13 of 15 seasons since its 2008 premiere. In 2018, she began headlining "Countess and Friends", a cabaret show of her own making.

She is the former wife of Alexandre de Lesseps, to whom she was married from 1993 to 2009.

== Early life ==
Born LuAnn Nadeau to French Canadian parents, she was raised in Berlin, Connecticut. She grew up with her six siblings and their father owned a construction company. In an early episode of The Real Housewives of New York City, de Lesseps shared that she had captained her high school varsity softball team.

== Career ==
De Lesseps was formerly a licensed practical nurse in Connecticut, as well as a Wilhelmina model. In 2008, de Lesseps became one of the main cast members on Bravo reality series The Real Housewives of New York City. For the sixth season, she was demoted to a recurring "Friend of the Housewives" role due to not living in New York City at the time of filming. In April 2015, it was confirmed that de Lesseps would be returning as a main cast member for the show's seventh season.

In February 2011, de Lesseps guest starred on Law & Order: Special Victims Unit, in the episode "Bully", playing a socialite who makes a gruesome discovery.

De Lesseps wrote a book, Class with the Countess: How to Live with Elegance and Flair, released April 16, 2009, and released her first record, "Money Can't Buy You Class" (through Ultra Records), on May 25, 2010. She released her second single, "Chic C'est la Vie" in June 2011. She released a third single, "Girl Code", on July 6, 2015. In June 2019, De Lesseps released her fourth single, "Feeling Jovani". In September 2020, she released her fifth single, "Viva La Diva", with Grammy-winning songwriter and producer Desmond Child.

In February 2017, de Lesseps played a role in the film Maternal Secrets in Bermuda. In May, de Lesseps appeared in the celebrity roast of Michael Musto. The roast, which was produced by Daniel DeMello and directed by Rachel Klein, was hosted by Bruce Vilanch and introduced by Rosie O'Donnell.

In February 2018, de Lesseps headlined her own cabaret show, called #CountessAndFriends, at Feinstein's/54 Below in Midtown Manhattan. The show features de Lesseps singing songs about her life as a countess and reality TV star, with appearances from celebrity friends like Rachel Dratch and Housewives co-star Sonja Morgan. In August 2018, de Lesseps announced that she was taking the show on tour, with engagements scheduled in Long Island and New Jersey.

De Lesseps has been a guest on Monét X Change's podcast The X Change Rate.

De Lesseps starred in the first season of The Real Housewives Ultimate Girls Trip, a spin-off featuring various women from The Real Housewives franchise, that premiered on Peacock in November 2021. In 2023, she co-starred in a Real Housewives spin-off series with longtime castmate Sonja Morgan, titled Luann & Sonja: Welcome to Crappie Lake, which premiered on July 9, 2023. de Lesseps starred in the fourth season of The Real Housewives Ultimate Girls Trip, which premiered in December 2023.

On September 29, 2023, de Lesseps was telecast judge of the 72nd Miss USA pageant held at the Grand Sierra Resort in Reno, Nevada. She also competed in season 10 of The Masked Singer as "Hibiscus" and was the first contestant of Group C to be eliminated during "One Hit Wonders Night".

In 2025, de Lesseps starred in a Real Housewives spin-off Love Hotel alongside Gizelle Bryant, Ashley Darby, and Shannon Storms Beador.

In February 2026, de Lesseps was announced as a cast member in the upcoming E! Network reality television show The Golden Life. The series will follow de Lesseps as well as former Real Housewives alumni Ramona Singer, Sonja Morgan, Kelly Bensimon, and Dorinda Medley uniting in Palm Beach, Florida.

== Personal life ==
In 1993, she married French count Alexandre de Lesseps, an entrepreneur and pioneer of microfinancing in developing countries. He is a descendant of Ferdinand de Lesseps, the French diplomat and entrepreneur who built the Suez Canal and started the Panama Canal. Together they have two children, Noel and Victoria. They divorced in 2009. On December 31, 2016, de Lesseps married Tom D’Agostino Jr., losing her “countess” courtesy title in the process (although such title has no current legal recognition by any nation). In August 2017, de Lesseps announced that she and D'Agostino were getting divorced. In October 2017, it was reported that the divorce had been settled out of court and would be finalized "imminently".

Her niece is artist Nicole Nadeau, who was on Bravo's Work of Art television series.

In July 2018, it was announced that de Lesseps had chosen to skip the filming of that year's RHONY reunion to re-enter an alcohol treatment program. De Lesseps left the facility after just under three weeks.

De Lesseps launched her non-alcoholic rosé wine called Fosé Rose in December 2021.

A few weeks later, de Lesseps dined at Le Diplomate, an upscale Washington, D.C., restaurant, and left without paying the bill. Several days later, de Lesseps paid her outstanding bill.

On March 16, 2022, de Lesseps was filmed taking over the microphone and saying obscenities to the crowd at a piano bar in New York City. On March 18, 2022, de Lesseps released a statement apologizing for her actions and admitting her struggle with alcohol is still real.

=== Legal problems ===
In December 2017, de Lesseps was arrested in Palm Beach, Florida, on charges of disorderly intoxication, resisting arrest, battery of an officer, and making threats against a public servant. She was later released on her own recognizance, but was charged with a third-degree felony on January 25, 2018. After her release she entered an alcohol treatment program.

In July 2018, de Lesseps settled the charges stemming from her Palm Beach arrest, by agreeing to plead guilty to the misdemeanor charges of battery, disorderly intoxication, and trespassing. In exchange, the felony charge of resisting an officer with violence was dropped, and de Lesseps agreed to fulfill 50 hours of community service, attend two Alcoholics Anonymous meetings a week, and to abstain from drinking alcohol for one year.

In May 2019, de Lesseps was taken into custody over her alleged probation violations and later released. She completed her probation in August 2019.

=== Advocacy ===
De Lesseps has donated to various charitable organizations, including The American Cancer Society, GLAAD, and ACE Partnership for the Homeless. She has most recently partnered with The Fortune Society, which supports formerly incarcerated inmates by helping them reenter into society.

== Filmography ==
Year	Title	Role	Notes
2008–2021	The Real Housewives of New York City	Herself	Main Cast: Seasons 1–5, 7–13 Recurring: Season 6
2008	Bravo A-List Awards	Herself	
2011	Law & Order: Special Victims Unit	Cindi	Episode: “Bully”
2011	My Favorite Place	Herself	Episode: “Beach Design”
2012-2024	Watch What Happens Live with Andy Cohen	Herself/Guest	31 episodes
2016	Difficult People	Herself	Episode: “Carter”
2018	Maternal Secrets	Mom	
2020	Sharon Needles Presents: Mask It or Casket	Herself	
2021, 2023 & 2026	The Real Housewives Ultimate Girls Trip	Herself	Main Cast: Seasons 1, 4, & 5
2021	For Real: The Story of Reality TV	Herself	7 episodes
2021	The Kelly Clarkson Show	Herself	Episode: “Cynthia Bailey, Luann de Lesseps, Teresa Giudice, Ramona Singer, Kenya Moore, Candiace Dillard Bassett"
2022	Project Runway	Herself	Episode: “The Housewives”
2022	Ziwe	Herself	Episode: “Empowerment”
2022-2025	Sherri	Herself/Guest	2 episodes
2023	The Masked Singer	Herself/Clue Giver & Hibiscus	2 episodes
2023	Luann & Sonja: Welcome to Crappie Lake	Herself	8 episodes
2023	Miss USA 2023	Herself/Judge	Episode: “The 72nd Annual Miss USA Pageant”
2023	Canada’s Drag Race	Herself/Judge	Episode: “From Drags to Riches: The Rusical”
2025	Murdoch Mysteries	Noelle Victoria	Episodes: “The Body Electric” & "The Boys Are Back in Town"
2025	Love Hotel	Herself	8 episodes
2026	The Golden Life	Herself	Main cast

== Discography ==
List of singles as lead artist, showing year released and album name
Title	Year	Album
"Money Can't Buy You Class"	2010	Non-album singles
"Chic C'est la Vie"	2011	Non-album singles
"Girl Code"	2015	Non-album singles
"Feelin' Jovani"	2019	Non-album singles
"Viva la Diva" (Desmond Child featuring Countess Luann)	2020	Non-album singles
"What Do I Want for Christmas?"	2021	Non-album singles
"F-Bombs on the G with the OG's"	2021	Non-album singles
"Marry F Kill"	2024	Non-album singles

== Bibliography ==
- Class with the Countess: How to Live with Elegance and Flair. Gotham Books. 2009.
