= Money Can't Buy You Class =

2010 single by Countess Luann

- Cover art for most digital retailers

Single by Countess Luann
- Released: April 26, 2010
- Studio: KMA Studio (New York City)
- Genre: Dance
- Length: 3:44
- Label: Ultra
- Songwriter(s): Luann de Lesseps; Chris Young
- Producer(s): Chris Young

Countess Luann singles chronology
"Money Can't Buy You Class" (2010)	"Chic C'est la Vie" (2011)

Music video
- "Money Can't Buy You Class" on YouTube

"Money Can't Buy You Class" is the debut single by American television personality Luann de Lesseps, under the stage name and former courtesy title of Countess Luann. She wrote the song with Chris Young, its sole producer. The song received a limited single release on April 26, 2010, through Ultra Records, before the label issued a wider one to digital retailers the following month. After writing her 2009 non-fiction book Class with the Countess: How to Live with Elegance and Flair, de Lesseps was inspired to create a song that conveyed a similar message. It is a disco, electronic, and house-influenced dance song that uses Pro Tools to manipulate de Lesseps' vocals. The lyrics continue the discussion of proper manners and etiquette, as explored in her book.

"Money Can't Buy You Class" received generally negative reviews from music critics, who panned de Lesseps' singing abilities. Some reviewers referred to it as so bad it's good. As of September 2011, the song has sold 19,000 copies in the United States. An accompanying music video was released in June 2010, featuring de Lesseps offering advice to a group of polished young men. James Kennedy remixed the song in 2018 for de Lesseps' performance at San Francisco Pride. Another remix was featured in her traveling cabaret show titled Countess and Friends, and the original was performed on several occasions for Watch What Happens Live with Andy Cohen.

== Background and release ==
During the second season of the American reality television series The Real Housewives of New York City, cast member Luann de Lesseps explored options in writing a non-fiction work on class, manners, and etiquette. The book, titled Class with the Countess: How to Live with Elegance and Flair, was eventually released in December 2009 by Avery Publishing. According to de Lesseps, she wanted to copy the themes and messages discussed in the book and create a song out of it, resulting in "Money Can't Buy You Class". The song was solely produced by New York City-based musician Chris Young, who also co-wrote the track with de Lesseps. After she revealed her former dream of becoming a singer, Young convinced her to work with him and create a song, ultimately recording "Money Can't Buy You Class" at KMA Studio in New York City.

The song premiered as a streaming exclusive via Bravo's website on April 26, 2010. It received a wider release on May 25, being released as a digital download in various countries, through Ultra Records. A promotional CD single of the song was developed and released in 2010. de Lesseps later hosted a release party for the CD, and donated a large quantity of copies for an anti-bullying charity event, hosted by fellow The Real Housewives of New York City cast member Jill Zarin. In June, the song appeared on the Ultra Records compilation album DJ Ricardo Presents Out. Anthems 5 (2010). In September 2011, The Hollywood Reporter reported that "Money Can't Buy You Class" had sold 19,000 digital copies in the United States. The song's exposure allowed de Lesseps to record a second single with Young and Ultra Records, "Chic C'est la Vie", in 2011. Reflecting on his work with de Lesseps, Young revealed that after every airing of "Housewives Overboard", a season 3 episode of The Real Housewives of New York City where he appears, he was receiving a substantial increase in demand for his work as a producer.

In April 2018, English television personality James Kennedy, a cast member of The Real Housewives spin-off series Vanderpump Rules, teased he was working on a remix of "Money Can't Buy You Class" for de Lesseps. Kennedy worked on the remix with de Lesseps, who was slotted to perform the new version of the song at 2018's annual San Francisco Pride. Of his experience rearranging the song, he told People: "it just came out perfect, working on this collab with the one and only Countess was awesome." The remix was released to digital retailers in various countries on June 21, 2018.

== Composition and lyrics ==
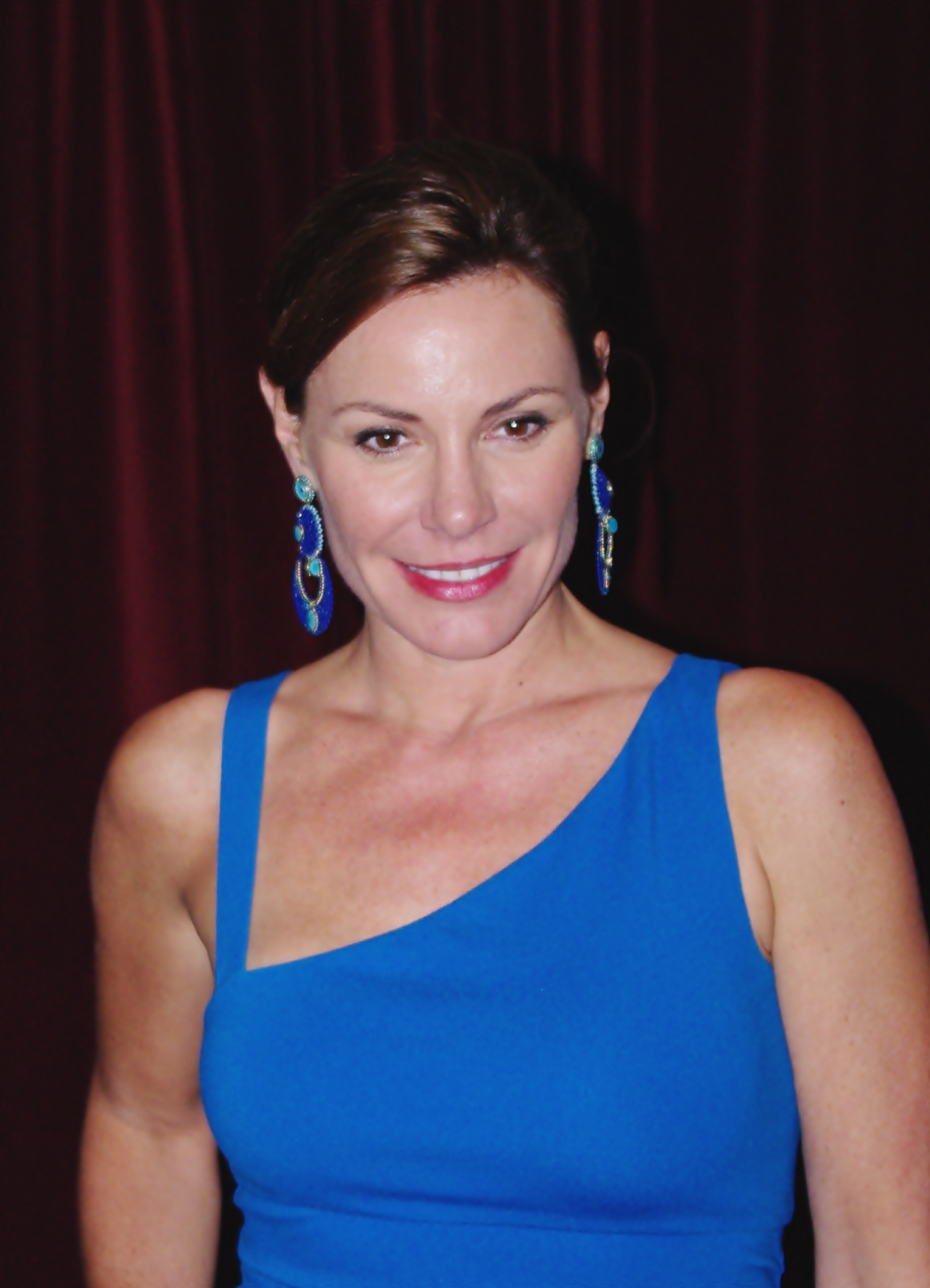
Luann de Lesseps (pictured in 2011) was inspired to create "Money Can't Buy You Class" after releasing her 2009 non-fiction book Class with the Countess: How to Live with Elegance and Flair.

Musically, "Money Can't Buy You Class" is a disco, house, and electronic-influenced dance song that features de Lesseps singing in an Auto-Tune-altered manner. It opens with a jazz-style piano introduction. Amelie Gillette from The A.V. Club noted de Lesseps' distinctively deep voice. Because of her inexperience when it came to music training, Young was driven to produce a song for de Lesseps that would be easily accessible in respect to her vocal abilities. He used the digital application Pro Tools to manipulate her voice and laid out a track that could be sung in her normal speaking tone, specifically avoiding writing a ballad. He clarified: "With the aid of a computer, a producer should be able to derive listenable product from anyone, if he uses his imagination [...] She hasn't had much formal training, it's pretty clear." de Lesseps compared "Money Can't Buy You Class" to the fictional character of Holly Golightly, describing its style as "runway, glamour-puss". Rya Backer from MTV News summarized the song's sound: "It's kind of like if Emily Post hooked up with T-Pain to record a spoken word jam at a late '90s Bar Mitzvah jam."

"Money Can't Buy You Class" is set in the time signature of common time, and has an average tempo of 124 beats per minute. The key of the song is in A minor and it advances with a setup of two verses, each followed by a refrain. The song utilizes the chord progression of F-Dm-Em-F throughout. The lyrics to "Money Can't Buy You Class" serve as a continuation of de Lesseps' discussion of class and etiquette, as first explored in Class with the Countess: How to Live with Elegance and Flair. They describe New York City's high society scene, as told through her point-of-view, and provide advice to the listener, suggesting tips such as "Life is all about elegance and flair and savoir-faire" and "It's not about where you're from, it's about what you've learned."

== Critical reception ==
Most music critics gave "Money Can't Buy You Class" negative reviews, although some described it as being so bad it's good. Marshall Heyman of The Wall Street Journal called the song "simultaneously abysmal and amazing". Gillette panned the song, dismissing de Lesseps' singing abilities as a spoken word style and comparing them to smokers who are featured in cigarette advertisements; she added that "when [de Lesseps] sings she sounds like a dream – a creepy, campy, wholly computer-generated dream". Entertainment Weekly's Chris Nashawaty called the song tacky and panned her singing: "her husky man-voice and stiff delivery sounds so god-awful". Sadie Gennis from TV Guide Magazine listed "Money Can't Buy You Class" as the fifth best Real Housewives-related song, explaining: "This song is absolutely terrible. And yet we love it." People's Dave Quinn called it the franchise's fourth best song and de Lesseps' signature song; he continued: "Like a fine wine, this bop has only gotten better with age." The Pittsburgh Post-Gazette called the song indulgent, noting its timing in the aftermath of de Lesseps' divorce from her husband. Kelly Conaboy from The Cut, reviewing Kennedy's remix of the song, called the new version even worse than the original.

== Promotion ==
Some music critics felt de Lesseps looked digitally-altered in the music video for "Money Can't Buy You Class".

The music video for "Money Can't Buy You Class" was released to Ultra Records' YouTube account on June 1, 2010. The video is an extension of the song's lyrical content, and finds de Lesseps offering etiquette advice to a group of young men. She "straightens up a young hunk’s tie, takes away the cellphone of a gentleman who’s texting on a 'date', and swaps out the beer bottles of her young squires for champagne flutes". Several reviewers discussed de Lesseps' appearance in the video. Idolator's Erika Brooks Adickman suggested that she had been "visually auto-tuned", while Edith Zimmerman from Vulture, despite calling the video delightful, remarked: "Money can't buy you class, but it can apparently buy you the technology to make yourself look like a different human being." Lanford Beard from People was less critical, calling de Lesseps' outfit in the video "on point". A Billboard staff member suggested that the video was hypocritical: "As she warns against texting during a date and not opening doors for ladies, the Countess revels in the nightlife and shares a bed with a dozen male models."

During de Lesseps' US cabaret show Countess and Friends, a baritone, beatbox remixed version of the song was performed. Alex Catarinella from Paper referred to her performance as the "most captivating" and said de Lesseps sang very well. She has also performed the song multiple times on Bravo's Watch What Happens Live with Andy Cohen, including in November 2020 when de Lesseps simultaneously debuted her new single "Viva la Diva" live for the first time.

== Track listings and formats ==
Digital download/promotional CD single
No.	Title	Length
1.	"Money Can't Buy You Class" (radio edit)	3:44

Digital download/streaming – James Kennedy Remix
No.	Title	Length
1.	"Money Can't Buy You Class" (James Kennedy remix)	2:42

== Release history ==
Release dates and formats for "Money Can't Buy You Class"
Region	Date	Format(s)	Version	Label	Ref.
United States	April 26, 2010	Streaming (via BravoTV.com)	Original	Ultra	
Various	May 25, 2010	Digital download	Original	Ultra	
United States	2010	Promotional CD single	Original	Ultra	
Various	June 21, 2018	Digital download; streaming	James Kennedy remix	Self-released	
