= Ababiya Abajobir =

Founding member of the Oromo Liberation Front

Ababiya Abajobir is a diplomat, lawyer and a founding member of the separatist organization Oromo Liberation Front (OLF). He served the OLF in many leading positions, including as head of OLF's Foreign Affairs in Washington from 2000 to 2003.

== Background ==
A grandson of Abba Jifar II, last Moti of the Kingdom of Jimma, in what is now the region of Oromia in southern Ethiopia, Ababiya Abajobir had served as head of OLF for many years. He was one of the leading figures that organized the 1974 Ethiopian Muslim protests which was pivotal in overthrowing the Haile Selassie regime. He had been imprisoned for ten years when the military regime was in power (1974–91).

During the transitional government (1991–95) when the OLF joined the Ethiopian government, he was assigned as Ethiopia's ambassador to Egypt. He served OLF in several positions after the organization left the government complaining about harassment by the Oromo Peoples' Democratic Organization (OPDO) and the TPLF-led government. In 2000, he became the leader of OLF's Foreign Affairs in Washington D.C., but he resigned in 2003 to try to bring peace between OLF and the government of Ethiopia.

In 2008, he said the questions regarding the Oromo people have been answered, adding that armed struggle by the OLF is outdated and unnecessary.

== See also ==
- Oromo people
- Ethiopian People's Revolutionary Democratic Front
