= KMA Music =

Recording studio

Coordinates: 40.76101°N 73.98465°W

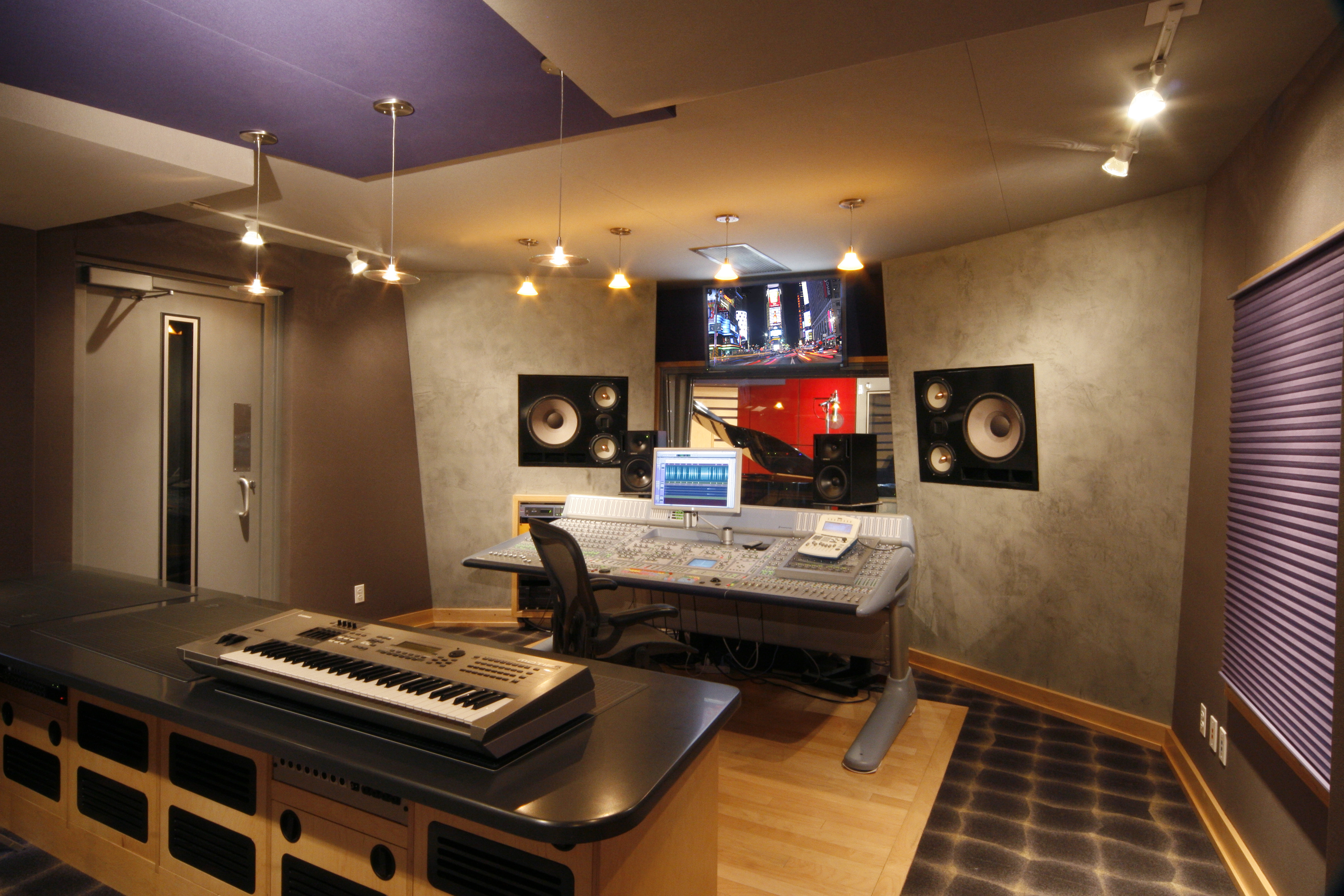
- KMA Studio A

KMA Music is a recording studio located in Midtown Manhattan, just north of Times Square, in the Theater District of New York City. It was opened in 1988 by Michael Case Kissel. Until 2007, the studio's original location was 1650 Broadway at 51st street. KMA has since moved to 1619 Broadway at 49th street. It's located in the Brill Building, a facility well known for its historical significance in the music industry. Shortly after moving, the studio underwent a major redesign. Consulting with Fran Manzella, a well known studio architect, KMA sought to modernize their appearance as well as music consultant Roy P. Perez to expand its major label clientele.
