= Sauce Gardner =

American football player (born 2001)

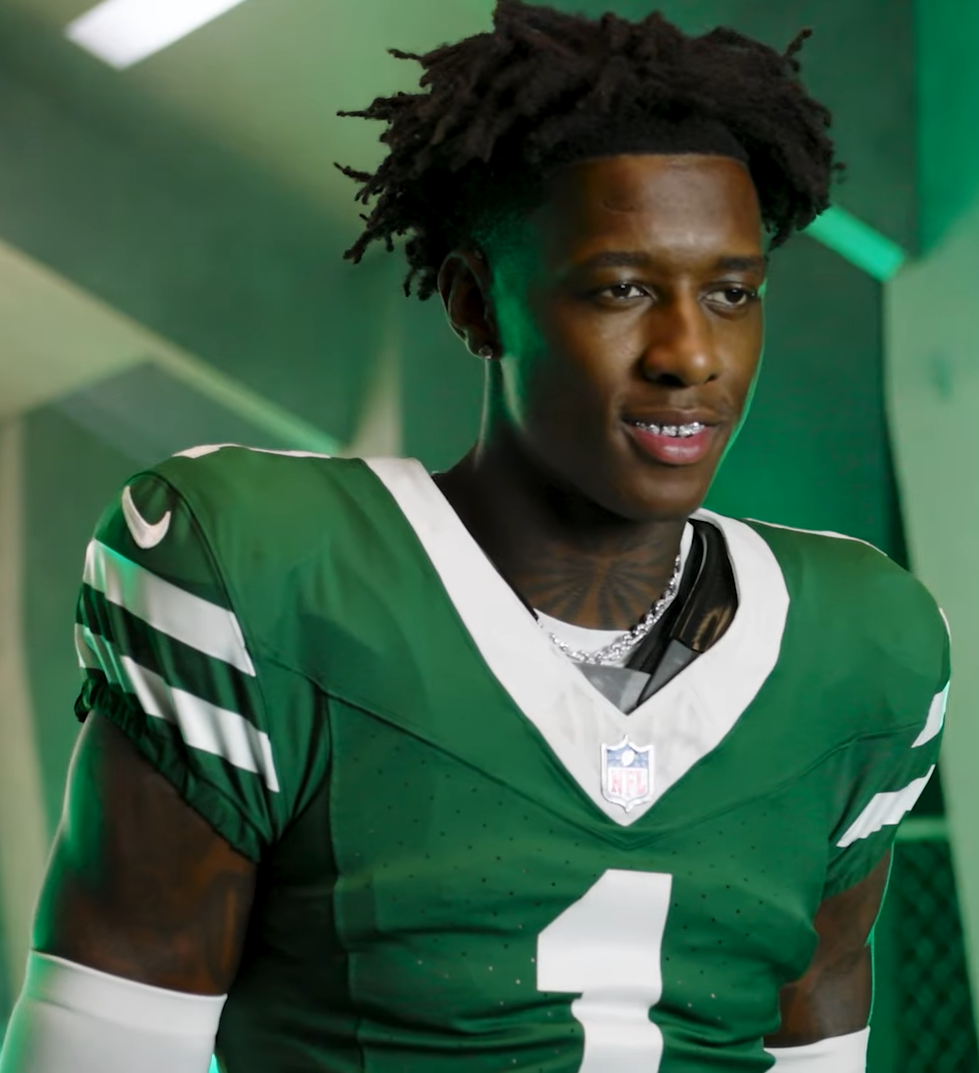
- Gardner with the New York Jets in 2025

No. 1 – Indianapolis Colts
- Position: Cornerback
- Roster status: Active

Personal information
- Born: August 31, 2001 (age 25); Detroit, Michigan, U.S.
- Listed height: 6 ft 3 in (1.91 m)
- Listed weight: 190 lb (86 kg)

Career information
- High school: Martin Luther King Jr. (Detroit)
- College: Cincinnati (2019–2021)
- NFL draft: 2022: 1st round, 4th overall pick

Career history
- New York Jets (2022–2025); Indianapolis Colts (2025–present)

Awards and highlights
- NFL Defensive Rookie of the Year (2022); 2× First-team All-Pro (2022, 2023); 2× Pro Bowl (2022, 2023); PFWA All-Rookie Team (2022); AAC Defensive Player of the Year (2021); Consensus All-American (2021); First-team All-American (2020); 3× First-team All-AAC (2019–2021)

Career NFL statistics as of Week 10, 2026
- Total tackles: 248
- Sacks: 1.0
- Forced fumbles: 1
- Pass deflections: 56
- Interceptions: 3
- Stats at Pro Football Reference

Ahmad "Sauce" Gardner (born August 31, 2001) (Note: Originally incorrectly reported as August 31, 2000. See: James Boyd, "Wait, how old is Sauce Gardner? Colts CB clears up confusion about his age," New York Times, June 18, 2026.) is an American professional football cornerback for the Indianapolis Colts of the National Football League (NFL). He played college football for the Cincinnati Bearcats and was selected fourth overall by the New York Jets in the 2022 NFL draft. Gardner was named the NFL Defensive Rookie of the Year and was the first rookie cornerback since Ronnie Lott in 1981 to be named first-team All-Pro.

== Early life ==
Gardner was born on August 31, 2001, in Detroit, Michigan. He attended Martin Luther King Jr. Senior High School, where he played wide receiver and cornerback on their football team. In the Division 2 State Championship, Gardner caught four passes for 126 yards and two touchdowns. After the season, Gardner was named an All-State selection at cornerback by the Associated Press. A three-star cornerback recruit, Gardner committed to play college football at Cincinnati over offers from Akron, Alabama A&M, Ball State, Bowling Green, Central Michigan, Colorado State, Indiana, Iowa State, Kentucky, Northern Illinois, Syracuse, Toledo, Western Michigan, and Youngstown State.

== College career ==
In 2019, his true freshman season, Gardner played in 11 games. He had 31 tackles and three interceptions, two of which he returned for touchdowns. He also tallied 11 passes defended and eight pass breakups. After the season, Gardner was the only true freshman named to the American Athletic Conference first-team. As a sophomore in 2020, Gardner began the season atop the depth chart as a starter. As a junior, Gardner was voted to the 2021 College Football All-America Team and named the AAC Defensive Player of the Year en route to helping Cincinnati become the first Group of Five team to reach the College Football Playoff. He declared for the 2022 NFL draft following the season.

== Professional career ==
=== Pre-draft ===
ESPN analyst Mel Kiper Jr. and NFL analysts Daniel Jeremiah and Bucky Brooks ranked Gardner as the top cornerback prospect in the draft. Dane Brugler of The Athletic and Rob Rang of Fox Sports ranked him as the second best cornerback in the draft. Pro Football Focus had him ranked third among all cornerbacks available in the draft. Cory Giddings of Bleacher Report had Gardner ranked as the second best cornerback (11th overall) among his position group. NFL draft analysts and scouts unanimously projected him to be selected in the first round.

External videos
- Sauce Gardner's College Highlights
- 2022 NFL Combine: Sauce Gardner

"Since joining the Bearcats, Gardner has filled out his frame and became a standout starter as a true freshman. He is a feisty competitor with excellent coverage instincts and he has above average ball skills. When it comes to areas of concern at the next level, there can be some drag-down tendencies as a tackler."

— The Draft Network

Pre-draft measurables
Height	Weight	Arm length	Hand span	Wingspan	40-yard dash	10-yard split	20-yard split
6 ft 2 3/4 in (1.90 m)	190 lb (86 kg)	33 1/2 in (0.85 m)	9 5/8 in (0.24 m)	6 ft 7 3/8 in (2.02 m)	4.41 s	1.54 s	2.56 s
All values from NFL Combine

=== New York Jets ===
==== 2022 ====
The New York Jets selected Gardner in the first round (fourth overall) of the 2022 NFL draft. He was the second cornerback selected in the draft and also became the highest drafted cornerback in the Jets' franchise history, surpassing 2013 first round pick (ninth overall) Dee Milliner. He was also the first of three Cincinnati defensive backs drafted along with second round pick (62nd overall) Bryan Cook and fourth round pick (102nd overall) Coby Bryant.

External videos
- NY Jets select Sauce Gardner No. 4
- New York Jets call Sauce Gardner
- Jets' draft room celebrates Sauce Gardner

"You do see it on tape, talking, quizzing, watching film with the guy. You can see that he’s an outside the box thinker, he can see, he’s got great vision of the field, he’s a tremendous communicator, can diagnose a play before it ever snaps. Again, I’m not comparing, but just being with Sherm, I mean the guy knew the play as soon as they broke the huddle… So, Sauce has a tremendous mental makeup to him that allows him to see the game differently than what most players can."

— Robert Saleh (NY Jets' head coach)

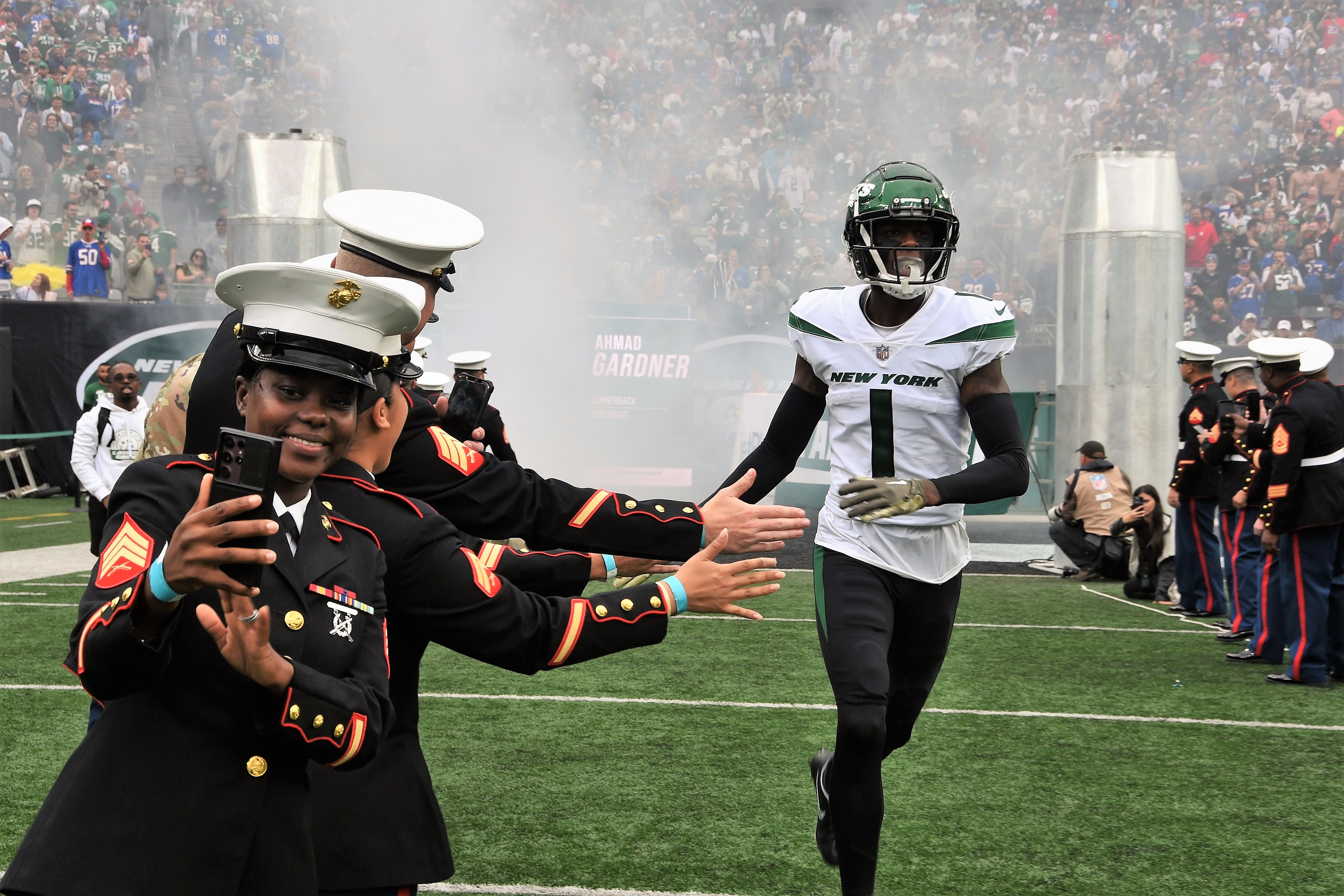
Gardner (right) in his rookie season with the Jets.

On May 7, 2022, the New York Jets signed Gardner to a fully-guaranteed four–year, $33.45 million rookie contract that includes an initial signing bonus of $21.50 million.

Throughout training camp, he competed to be a starting cornerback against Bryce Hall under defensive coordinator Jeff Ulbrich. Head coach Robert Saleh named him a starting cornerback to begin the season and paired him with D. J. Reed.

On September 11, 2022, Gardner made his professional regular season debut and earned his first career start in the New York Jets' home-opener against the Baltimore Ravens and recorded two solo tackles and one pass deflection during a 9–24 loss. On October 9, 2022, Gardner made five combined tackles (three solo), one pass deflection, and had his first career interception on a pass by Teddy Bridgewater to wide receiver River Cracraft during a 40–17 victory against the Miami Dolphins. In Week 7, he set a season-high with ten combined tackles (eight solo) and had three pass deflections during a 16–9 victory at the Denver Broncos. He earned the AFC Defensive Player of the Week. On November 6, 2022, he made seven combined tackles (three solo), one pass deflection, and intercepted a pass attempt thrown by Josh Allen to wide receiver Gabriel Davis during a 20–17 win against the Buffalo Bills. He started all 17 games as a rookie in 2022 and finished with a total of 75 combined tackles (51 solo), two interceptions, and led the league with 20 passes defensed. He was selected for the 2023 Pro Bowl Games, joining Tariq Woolen of the Seattle Seahawks as the only rookies selected. He won the NFL Defensive Rookie of the Year award and was also named a first-team All-Pro, becoming the first rookie cornerback to achieve the honor since Ronnie Lott in 1981. He was ranked 23rd by his fellow players on the NFL Top 100 Players of 2023. He received an overall grade of 88.5 from Pro Football Focus as a rookie in 2022.

==== 2023 ====
Gardner entered training camp slated as the de facto No. 1 starting cornerback. He was named a starting cornerback to begin the season and was paired with D. J. Reed.

In Week 2, he set a season-high with six combined tackles (four solo) and had one pass deflection during a 10–30 loss at the Dallas Cowboys. On October 14, 2023, the Jets announced that they chose to place Gardner in concussion protocol and he would remain inactive for the Jets' Week 6 matchup against the Philadelphia Eagles. The concussion occurred during the week leading up to their 20–14 victory against the Eagles, but Gardner released a statement saying he was perfectly fine and he didn't agree with the decision to list him inactive. He finished the season with 57 combined tackles (41 solo), 11 pass deflections, and one forced fumble in 16 games and 16 starts. He earned Pro Bowl honors for the second consecutive season and was also selected to be first-team All-Pro. Gardner became the third defensive player and only cornerback in NFL history to receive first-team All-Pro honors in each of his first two seasons in the league. He received an overall grade of 88.6 from Pro Football Focus in 2023. He was ranked 38th by his fellow players on the NFL Top 100 Players of 2024.

==== 2024 ====
Head coach Robert Saleh named Gardner and D. J. Reed the starting cornerbacks to begin their third consecutive season. On September 9, 2024, Gardner started in the New York Jets' season-opener at the San Francisco 49ers and had three combined tackles (one solo), made one pass deflection, and had his first career sack on wide receiver Deebo Samuel for a four–yard loss during a 19–32 loss. In Week 4, he set a season-high with five combined tackles (four solo) during a 9–10 loss against the Denver Broncos. On October 8, 2024, the Jets fired head coach Robert Saleh after beginning the season with a 2–3 record and appointed defensive coordinator Jeff Ulbrich the interim head coach for the remaining 12 games. In Week 13, Gardner made three solo tackles and two pass deflections before exiting in the fourth quarter of a 21–26 loss to the Seattle Seahawks due to a hamstring injury. He subsequently remained inactive for the Jets' 26–32 overtime loss at the Miami Dolphins in Week 14. On December 15, 2024, Gardner had five combined tackles (two solo), made two pass deflections, and secured the Jets' 32–25 victory at the Jacksonville Jaguars by intercepting a pass by Mac Jones to wide receiver Parker Washington with only 44 seconds remaining. On January 4, 2025, the Jets officially placed him on injured reserve due to a hamstring injury and he remained inactive as they defeated the Miami Dolphins 32–20 in Week 18. He finished the 2024 NFL season with 49 combined tackles (36 solo), nine pass deflections, one interception, and one sack in 15 games and 15 starts. He received an overall grade of 70.2 from Pro Football Focus, which ranked 47th among 222 qualifying cornerbacks in 2024.

==== 2025 ====
The Jets picked up the fifth-year option on Gardner's contract. On July 15, 2025, Gardner signed a four-year, $120.4 million contract extension with the Jets.

=== Indianapolis Colts ===
On November 4, 2025, the Jets traded Gardner to the Indianapolis Colts in exchange for wide receiver Adonai Mitchell and two first-round picks; one in 2026 (16th overall, which the Jets later used to select tight end Kenyon Sadiq) and one in 2027. He finished the 2025 season with 36 total tackles (28 solo) and nine passes defended.

== Career statistics ==
Legend
	Led the league
**Bold**	Career high

=== NFL ===
Year	Team	Games		Tackles							Interceptions						Fumbles				
Year	Team	GP	GS	Cmb	Solo	Ast	TFL	QBH	Sck	Sfty	PD	Int	Yds	Y/I	Lng	TD	FF	FR	Yds	Y/R	TD
2022	NYJ	17	17	**75**	**51**	**24**	**3**	**1**	0.0	0	**20**	**2**	**19**	**9.5**	**16**	0	0	0	0	-	0
2023	NYJ	16	16	57	41	16	2	0	0.0	0	11	0	0	-	0	0	**1**	0	0	-	0
2024	NYJ	15	15	49	36	13	1	**1**	**1.0**	0	9	1	0	0.0	0	0	0	0	0	-	0
2025	NYJ	7	7	20	15	5	0	0	0.0	0	6	0	0	-	0	0	0	0	0	-	0
2025	IND	4	4	16	13	3	0	0	0.0	0	1	0	0	0.0	0	0	0	0	0	0.0	0
2026	IND	9	9	31	24	7	0	0	0.0	0	7	0	0	0.0	0	0	0	0	0	0.0	0
Career		68	68	248	180	68	6	2	1.0	0	56	3	19	6.3	16	0	1	0	0	0.0	0

=== College ===
Year	Team	GP	Tackles					Interceptions					Fumbles		
Year	Team	GP	Solo	Ast	Cmb	TFL	Sck	Int	Yds	Avg	TD	PD	FR	FF	TD
2019	Cincinnati	11	24	7	31	0	0	**3**	**78**	**26**	**2**	**6**	0	0	0
2020	Cincinnati	9	16	**12**	28	0.5	0.5	**3**	18	6	0	**6**	0	0	0
2021	Cincinnati	13	**28**	**12**	**40**	**5**	**3**	**3**	7	2.3	0	4	0	0	0
Career		33	68	31	99	5.5	3.5	9	103	11.4	2	16	0	0	0

== Personal life ==
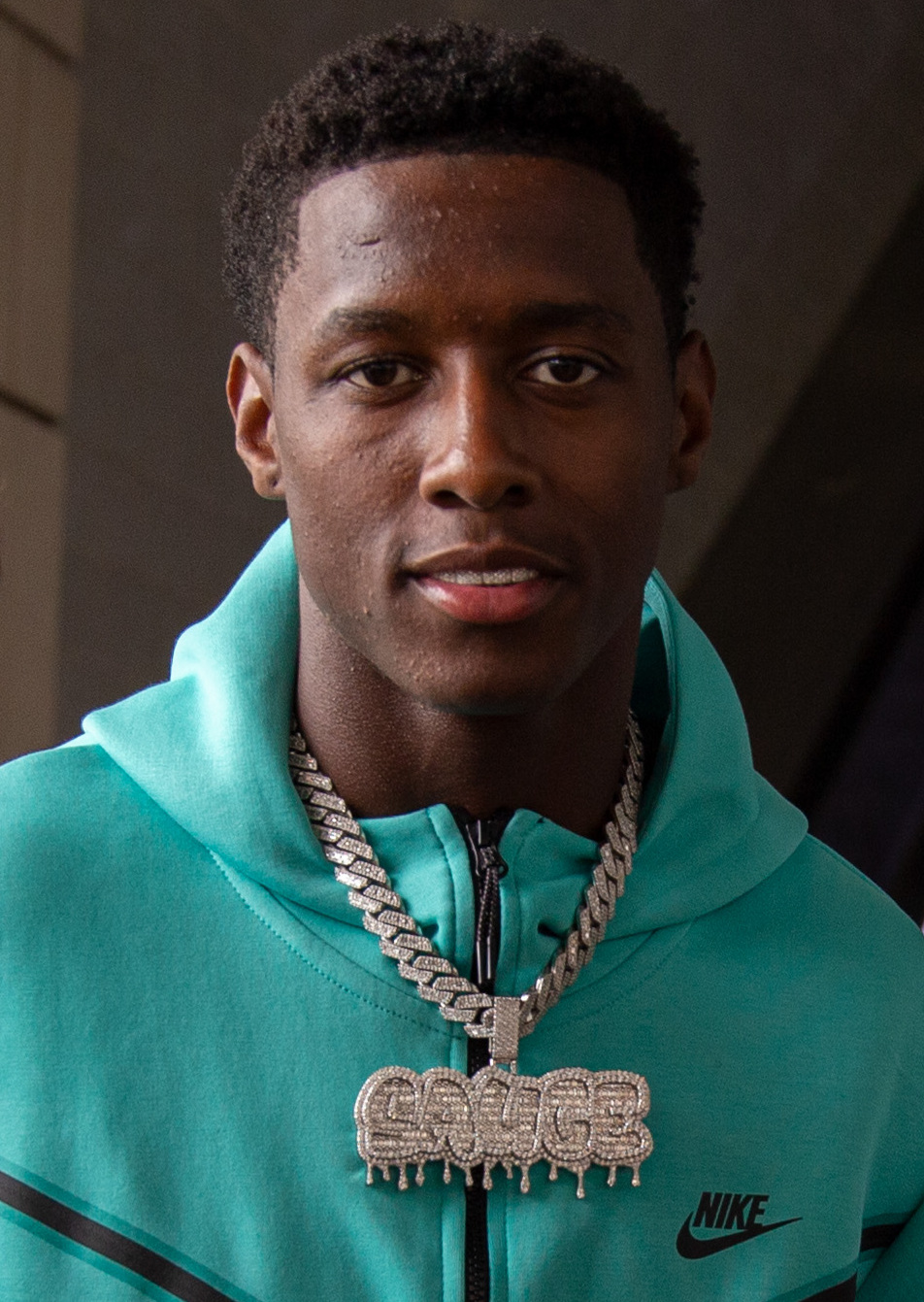
Gardner's chain with his customized "Sauce" pendant

Gardner is a proud Christian.

Gardner got the nickname "Sauce" (Note: Originally "A1 Sauce Sweet Feet Gardner" before being shortened.) from a youth football coach at age six. After being drafted, in 2022, he partnered with the sports bar chain Buffalo Wild Wings to endorse a sweet and spicy barbecue sauce known as "Sauce Sauce". He is also dating Latto's sister Brooklyn Nicole.
