= Steeg =

Steeg may refer to:

- Steeg (surname)
- Steeg, Tyrol, a municipality in Tyrol, Austria
- De Steeg, a village in the municipality of Rheden, Netherlands
