= 2021 American Athletic Conference football season =

- League: NCAA Division I Football Bowl Subdivision
- Sport: Football
- Duration: September 2, 2021 — December 31, 2021
- Teams: 11
- TV partner(s): ABC, ESPN, ESPN2, ESPNU, and CBS Sports Network

2022 NFL Draft
- Top draft pick: Sauce Gardner (Cincinnati)
- Picked by: New York Jets, 4th overall

Regular season
- Season champions: Cincinnati
- Runners-up: Houston

The American Championship

Football seasons
- 2020 2022

2021 American Athletic Conference football standings
	Conf.			Overall
Team	W		L	W		L
No. 4 Cincinnati y$^	8	–	0	13	–	1
No. 17 Houston y	8	–	0	12	–	2
UCF	5	–	3	9	–	4
East Carolina	5	–	3	7	–	5
Tulsa	5	–	3	7	–	6
SMU	4	–	4	8	–	4
Memphis	3	–	5	6	–	6
Navy	3	–	5	4	–	8
Tulane	1	–	7	2	–	10
South Florida	1	–	7	2	–	10
Temple	1	–	7	3	–	9
Championship: Cincinnati 35, Houston 20
^ – College Football Playoff participant; $ – Conference champion; y – Championship game participant; Rankings from AP Poll

The 2021 American Athletic Conference football season was the 30th NCAA Division I FBS Football season of the American Athletic Conference (The American). The season was the ninth since the former Big East Conference dissolved and became the American Athletic Conference and the eighth season of the College Football Playoff in place. The American was considered a member of the Group of Five (G5) together with Conference USA (C–USA), the Mid-American Conference (MAC), the Mountain West Conference and the Sun Belt Conference.

== Preseason ==
=== Recruiting classes ===
Rankings
Team	ESPN	Rivals	24/7
Cincinnati		39	45
East Carolina		100	97
Houston		85	84
Memphis		48	47
Navy		68	104
SMU		61	51
South Florida		56	64
Temple			117
Tulane		85	81
Tulsa			127
UCF		54	58

=== American Athletic Conference Media Days ===
The 2021 American Media day was held virtually August 3 and 4, 2021

•2021 The American Virtual Football Media Days

==== Preseason media poll ====
The American Athletic Conference preseason media poll was released at the virtual media day held August 4, 2021. Cincinnati, who finished the 2020 season ranked No. 8 nationally, was tabbed as the preseason favorite in the 2021 preseason media poll.

Media poll
Predicted finish	Team	Votes (1st place)
1	Cincinnati	262 (22)
2	UCF	241 (2)
3	SMU	188
4	Houston	181
5	Memphis	168
6	Tulsa	153
7	Tulane	132
т-8	East Carolina	85
т-8	Navy	85
10	Temple	46
11	South Florida	43

=== Preseason awards ===
Award	Head coach/Player	School	Position	Link
Lott Trophy	Coby Bryant	Cincinnati	CB	
Dodd Trophy	Luke Fickell	Cincinnati	HC	
Maxwell Award	Desmond Ridder	Cincinnati	QB	
Maxwell Award	Calvin Austin	Memphis	WR	
Maxwell Award	Ulysses Bentley IV	SMU	RB	
Maxwell Award	Reggie Roberson Jr.	SMU	WR	
Maxwell Award	Dillon Gabriel	UCF	QB	
Bednarik Award	Sauce Gardner	Cincinnati	CB	
Bednarik Award	Myjai Sanders	Cincinnati	DE	
Bednarik Award	Quindell Johnson	Memphis	S	
Bednarik Award	Diego Fagot	Navy	LB	
Davey O'Brien Award	Desmond Ridder	Cincinnati	QB	
Davey O'Brien Award	Dillon Gabriel	UCF	QB	
Doak Walker Award	Rahjai Harris	East Carolina	RB	
Doak Walker Award	Mulbah Car	Houston	RB	
Doak Walker Award	Ulysses Bentley IV	SMU	RB	
Doak Walker Award	Cameron Carroll	Tulane	RB	
Doak Walker Award	Shamari Brooks	Tulsa	RB	
Fred Biletnikoff Award	Calvin Austin	Memphis	WR	
Fred Biletnikoff Award	Rashee Rice	SMU	WR	
Fred Biletnikoff Award	Reggie Roberson Jr.	SMU	WR	
Fred Biletnikoff Award	Keylon Stokes	Tulsa	WR	
Fred Biletnikoff Award	Jaylon Robinson	UCF	WR	
John Mackey Award	Josh Whyle	Cincinnati	TE	
John Mackey Award	Grant Calcaterra	SMU	TE	
Rimington Trophy	Kody Russey	Houston	OL	
Rimington Trophy	C.J. Perez	Temple	OL	
Rimington Trophy	Sincere Haynesworth	Tulane	OL	
Outland Trophy	Dylan Parham	Memphis	G	
Outland Trophy	Jaylon Thomas	SMU	T	
Outland Trophy	Corey Dublin	Tulane	G	
Outland Trophy	Tyler Smith	Tulsa	T	
Outland Trophy	Cole Schneider	UCF	DT	
Bronko Nagurski Trophy	Diego Fagot	Navy	LB	
Bronko Nagurski Trophy	Sauce Gardner	Cincinnati	CB	
Bronko Nagurski Trophy	Myjai Sanders	Cincinnati	DE	
Bronko Nagurski Trophy	Jaxon Player	Tulsa	DT	
Lou Groza Award	Blake Mazza	SMU	PK	
Paul Hornung Award	Tyler Snead	East Carolina	WR	
Paul Hornung Award	Nathaniel Dell	Houston	WR	
Paul Hornung Award	Danny Gray	SMU	WR	
Paul Hornung Award	Jha'Quan Jackson	Tulane	WR	
Paul Hornung Award	Keylon Stokes	Tulsa	WR	
Wuerffel Trophy	Holton Ahlers	East Carolina	QB	
Wuerffel Trophy	Marcus Jones	Houston	DB	
Wuerffel Trophy	Preston Brady	Memphis	LS	
Wuerffel Trophy	Shaine Hailey	SMU	LB	
Wuerffel Trophy	Mitchell Brinkman	South Florida	CB	
Wuerffel Trophy	Re-Al Mitchell	Temple	QB	
Wuerffel Trophy	Nick Anderson	Tulane	LB	
Wuerffel Trophy	Chris Paul	Tulsa	OG	
Walter Camp Award	Desmond Ridder	Cincinnati	QB	
Walter Camp Award	Dillon Gabriel	UCF	QB	
Manning Award	Desmond Ridder	Cincinnati	QB	
Manning Award	Michael Pratt	Tulane	QB	
Manning Award	Dillon Gabriel	UCF	QB	
Earl Campbell Tyler Rose Award	Clayton Tune	Houston	QB	
Earl Campbell Tyler Rose Award	Sean Dykes	Memphis	TE	
Earl Campbell Tyler Rose Award	Ulysses Bentley IV	SMU	RB	
Earl Campbell Tyler Rose Award	Reggie Roberson, Jr.	SMU	RB	
Earl Campbell Tyler Rose Award	Deneric Prince	Tulsa	RB	
Earl Campbell Tyler Rose Award	Keylon Stokes	Tulsa	WR	
Earl Campbell Tyler Rose Award	Jaylon Robinson	UCF	WR	
Ray Guy Award	Jonn Young	East Carolina	P	
Ray Guy Award	Laine Wilkins	Houston	P	
Ray Guy Award	Daniel Davies	Navy	P	
Ray Guy Award	Adam Barry	Temple	P	
Ray Guy Award	Ryan Wright	Tulane	P	
Ray Guy Award	Lachlan Wilson	Tulsa	P	
Ray Guy Award	Andrew Osteen	UCF	P	
Polynesian College Football Player Of The Year Award	Tama Tuitele	Navy	LB	
Johnny Unitas Golden Arm Award	Desmond Ridder	Cincinnati	QB	
Johnny Unitas Golden Arm Award	Clayton Tune	Houston	QB	
Johnny Unitas Golden Arm Award	Dillon Gabriel	UCF	QB	

== Head coaches ==
=== Coaching changes ===
On January 27, 2021 Josh Heupel departed UCF to Tennessee. Gus Malzahn was hired to serve as the new head coach on February 15, 2021.

=== Coaches ===
Note: All stats current through the completion of the 2021 regular season

Team	Head coach	Years at school	Overall record	Record at school	AAC record
Cincinnati	Luke Fickell	5	53–21 (.716)	47–14 (.770)	29–9 (.763)
East Carolina	Mike Houston	3	94–44 (.681)	14–19 (.424)	4–12 (.250)
Houston	Dana Holgorsen	3	68–54 (.557)	7–13 (.350)	5–9 (.357)
Memphis	Ryan Silverfield	2	8–4 (.667)	8–4 (.667)	5–3 (.625)
Navy	Ken Niumatalolo	14	101–67 (.601)	101–67 (.601)	30–17 (.638)
SMU	Sonny Dykes	4	63–59 (.516)	22–14 (.611)	14–9 (.609)
South Florida	Jeff Scott	2	1–8 (.111)	1–8 (.111)	0–7 (.000)
Temple	Rod Carey	3	61–41 (.598)	9–11 (.450)	6–9 (.400)
Tulane	Willie Fritz	6	185–112 (.623)	31–43 (.419)	16–32 (.333)
Tulsa	Philip Montgomery	7	37–46 (.446)	37–46 (.446)	24–29 (.453)
UCF	Gus Malzahn	1	85–42 (.669)	8–4 (.667)	5–3 (.625)

== Rankings ==
Legend
	Improvement in ranking
	Drop in ranking
	Not ranked previous week
RV	Received votes but were not ranked in Top 25 of poll

		Pre	Wk 2	Wk 3	Wk 4	Wk 5	Wk 6	Wk 7	Wk 8	Wk 9	Wk 10	Wk 11	Wk 12	Wk 13	Wk 14	Final
Cincinnati	AP	7	8	8	7	5	3	2	2	2	2	3	4	3	4	4
Cincinnati	C	10	8	9	8	6	4	3	2	2	3	3	4	4	4	4
Cincinnati	CFP	Not released								6	5	5	4	4	4	
East Carolina	AP															
East Carolina	C															
East Carolina	CFP	Not released														
Houston	AP	RV						RV	RV	20	17	17	19	16	21	17
Houston	C	RV					RV	RV	RV	19	17	17	16	16	21	17
Houston	CFP	Not released										24	24	21	20	
Memphis	AP				RV											
Memphis	C			RV	RV	RV										
Memphis	CFP	Not released														
Navy	AP															
Navy	C															
Navy	CFP	Not released														
SMU	AP					RV	24	23	21	19	23	RV	RV			
SMU	C	RV	RV	RV	RV	RV	24	23	19	16	24	RV	RV			
SMU	CFP	Not released														
South Florida	AP															
South Florida	C															
South Florida	CFP	Not released														
Temple	AP															
Temple	C															
Temple	CFP	Not released														
Tulane	AP															
Tulane	C		RV	RV	RV											
Tulane	CFP	Not released														
Tulsa	AP															
Tulsa	C	RV														
Tulsa	CFP	Not released														
UCF	AP	RV	RV	RV												
UCF	C	RV	RV	RV	RV											
UCF	CFP	Not released														

== Schedule ==
The regular season will begin on September 2, 2021 and will end on November 27, 2021. The season will conclude with the 2021 American Athletic Conference Championship Game on December 4.

At Media Day American Commissioner Mike Aresco said games will not be rescheduled this year because of COVID & if teams can't play, they will have to forfeit

=== Regular season ===
Index to colors and formatting
American member won
American member lost
American teams in **bold**

==== Week One ====
Date	Time	Visiting team	Home team	Site	TV	Result	Attendance	Ref.
September 2	7:00 p.m.	Boise State	**UCF**	Bounce House • Orlando, FL	ESPN	**W** 36–31	43,928	
September 2	7:30 p.m.	**East Carolina**	Appalachian State	Bank of America Stadium • Charlotte, NC (Duke's Mayo Classic)	ESPNU	**L** 19–33	36,752	
September 2	7:30 p.m.	**South Florida**	NC State	Carter–Finley Stadium • Raleigh, NC	ACC Network	**L** 0–45	52,633	
September 2	7:30 p.m.	No. 23 (FCS) UC Davis	**Tulsa**	H.A. Chapman Stadium • Tulsa, OK	ESPN+	**L** 17–19	15,085	
September 4	Noon	**Temple**	Rutgers	SHI Stadium • Piscataway, NJ	BTN	**L** 14–61	52,519	
September 4	Noon	No. 2 Oklahoma	**Tulane**	Gaylord Family Oklahoma Memorial Stadium • Norman, OK (Note: Originally scheduled to be played as a home game, the game against Oklahoma was moved to Norman, Oklahoma on August 30, 2021, due to safety concerns related to Hurricane Ida. Tulane will remain the designated home team despite Oklahoma hosting the game.)	ABC	**L** 35–40	42,206	
September 4	3:30 p.m.	Miami (OH)	No. 8 **Cincinnati**	Nippert Stadium • Cincinnati, OH (Victory Bell)	ESPN+	**W** 49–14	37,978	
September 4	3:30 p.m.	Marshall	**Navy**	Navy–Marine Corps Memorial Stadium • Annapolis, MD	CBSSN	**L** 7–49	30,131	
September 4	7:00 p.m.	Texas Tech	**Houston**	NRG Stadium • Houston, TX (Texas Kickoff, rivalry)	ESPN	**L** 21–38	43,478	
September 4	7:00 p.m.	No. 22 (FCS) Nicholls	**Memphis**	Liberty Bowl Memorial Stadium • Memphis, TN	ESPN+	**W** 42–17	30,263	
September 4	7:00 p.m.	Abilene Christian	**SMU**	Gerald J. Ford Stadium • University Park, TX	ESPN+	**W** 56–9	23,373	
^{#}Rankings from AP Poll released prior to game. All times are in Eastern Time.

==== Week Two ====
Date	Time	Visiting team	Home team	Site	TV	Result	Attendance	Ref.
September 11	Noon	South Carolina	**East Carolina**	Dowdy–Ficklen Stadium • Greenville, NC	ESPN2	**L** 17–20	40,816	
September 11	Noon	**Tulsa**	Oklahoma State	Boone Pickens Stadium • Stillwater, OK (rivalry)	FS1	**L** 23–28	52,127	
September 11	1:00 p.m.	No. 13 Florida	**South Florida**	Raymond James Stadium • Tampa, FL	ABC	**L** 20–42	64,692	
September 11	1:00 p.m.	Morgan State	**Tulane**	Legion Field • Birmingham, AL (Note: Originally scheduled to be played as a home game, the game against Morgan State was moved to Birmingham, Alabama due continued storm repairs taking place in New Orleans following Hurricane Ida. Tulane remained the designated home team.)	ESPN+	**W** 69–20	2,100	
September 11	3:30 p.m.	Murray State	No. 7 **Cincinnati**	Nippert Stadium • Cincinnati, OH	ESPN+	**W** 42–7	33,498	
September 11	3:30 p.m.	Air Force	**Navy**	Navy–Marine Corps Memorial Stadium • Annapolis, MD (Commander-in-Chief's Trophy)	CBS	**L** 3–23	36,997	
September 11	3:30 p.m.	**Temple**	Akron	InfoCision Stadium • Akron, OH	ESPN+	**W** 45–24	14,474	
September 11	6:30 p.m.	Bethune-Cookman	**UCF**	Bounce House • Orlando, FL	ESPN+	**W** 63–14	38,443	
September 11	6:30 p.m.	**Houston**	Rice	Rice Stadium • Houston, TX (rivalry)	CBSSN	**W** 44–7	26,253	
September 11	7:00 p.m.	**Memphis**	Arkansas State	Centennial Bank Stadium • Jonesboro, AR (Paint Bucket Bowl)	ESPN+	**W** 55–50	19,501	
September 11	7:00 p.m.	North Texas	**SMU**	Gerald J. Ford Stadium • University Park, TX (Safeway Bowl)	ESPN+	**W** 35–12	29,121	
^{#}Rankings from AP Poll released prior to game. All times are in Eastern Time.

==== Week Three ====
Date	Time	Visiting team	Home team	Site	TV	Result	Attendance	Ref.
September 17	7:30 p.m.	**UCF**	Louisville	Cardinal Stadium • Louisville, KY	ESPN	**L** 35–42	39,022	
September 18	Noon	No. 8 **Cincinnati**	Indiana	Memorial Stadium • Bloomington, IN	ESPN	**W** 38–24	52,656	
September 18	Noon	Boston College	**Temple**	Lincoln Financial Field • Philadelphia, PA	ESPNU	**L** 3–28	25,290	
September 18	3:30 p.m.	**SMU**	Louisiana Tech	Joe Aillet Stadium • Ruston, LA	CBSSN	**W** 39–37	15,326	
September 18	3:30 p.m.	**Tulsa**	No. 9 Ohio State	Ohio Stadium • Columbus, OH	FS1	**L** 20–41	76,540	
September 18	4:00 p.m.	Mississippi State	**Memphis**	Liberty Bowl Memorial Stadium • Memphis, TN	ESPN2	**W** 31–29	43,461	
September 18	6:00 p.m.	**East Carolina**	Marshall	Joan C. Edwards Stadium • Huntington, WV (rivalry)	CBSSN Facebook	**W** 42–38	24,833	
September 18	7:00 p.m.	Grambling State	**Houston**	TDECU Stadium • Houston, TX	ESPN+	**W** 45–0	22,998	
September 18	7:00 p.m.	Florida A&M	**South Florida**	Raymond James Stadium • Tampa, FL	ESPN+	**W** 38–17	29,475	
September 18	8:00 p.m.	**Tulane**	No. 17 Ole Miss	Vaught–Hemingway Stadium • Oxford, MS (rivalry)	ESPN2	**L** 21–61	54,198	
^{#}Rankings from AP Poll released prior to game. All times are in Eastern Time.

Date	Bye Week
September 18	Navy

==== Week Four ====
Date	Time	Visiting team	Home team	Site	TV	Result	Attendance	Ref.
September 25	Noon	**SMU**	TCU	Amon G. Carter Stadium • Fort Worth, TX (rivalry)	FS1	**W** 42–34	46,672	
September 25	Noon	Wagner	**Temple**	Lincoln Financial Field • Philadelphia, PA	ESPN+	**W** 41–7	20,179	
September 25	3:30 p.m.	UTSA	**Memphis**	Liberty Bowl Memorial Stadium • Memphis, TN	ESPNU	**L** 28–31	29,264	
September 25	5:00 p.m.	Arkansas State	**Tulsa**	H.A. Chapman Stadium • Tulsa, OK	ESPN+	**W** 41–34	14,881	
September 25	6:00 p.m.	Charleston Southern	**East Carolina**	Dowdy–Ficklen Stadium • Greenville, NC	ESPN+	**W** 31–28	39,218	
September 25	7:00 p.m.	**Navy**	**Houston**	TDECU Stadium • Houston, TX	ESPNU	**HOU** 28–20	25,054	
September 25	8:00 p.m.	UAB	**Tulane**	Yulman Stadium • New Orleans, LA	ESPN+	**L** 21–28	16,023	
September 25	10:15 p.m.	**South Florida**	No. 15 BYU	LaVell Edwards Stadium • Provo, UT	ESPN2	**L** 27–35	60,217	
^{#}Rankings from AP Poll released prior to game. All times are in Eastern Time.

Date	Bye Week	
September 25	UCF	No. 8 Cincinnati

==== Week Five ====
Date	Time	Visiting team	Home team	Site	TV	Result	Attendance	Ref.
October 1	7:30 p.m.	**Houston**	**Tulsa**	H.A. Chapman Stadium • Tulsa, OK	ESPN	**HOU** 45–10	15,890	
October 2	Noon	**Memphis**	**Temple**	Lincoln Financial Field • Philadelphia, PA	ESPNU	**TEM** 34–31	28,573	
October 2	2:30 p.m.	No. 7 **Cincinnati**	No. 9 Notre Dame	Notre Dame Stadium • Notre Dame, IN	NBC	**W** 24–13	77,622	
October 2	3:30 p.m.	**Tulane**	**East Carolina**	Dowdy–Ficklen Stadium • Greenville, NC	ESPN+	**ECU** 52–29	33,475	
October 2	3:30 p.m.	**UCF**	**Navy**	Navy–Marine Corps Memorial Stadium • Annapolis, MD	CBSSN	**NAVY** 34–30	30,871	
October 2	4:00 p.m.	**South Florida**	**SMU**	Gerald J. Ford Stadium • University Park, TX	ESPNU	**SMU** 41–17	23,355	
^{#}Rankings from AP Poll released prior to game. All times are in Eastern Time.

==== Week Six ====
Date	Time	Visiting team	Home team	Site	TV	Result	Attendance	Ref.
October 7	7:30 p.m.	**Houston**	**Tulane**	Yulman Stadium • New Orleans, LA	ESPN	**HOU** 40–22	15,026	
October 8	7:00 p.m.	**Temple**	No. 5 **Cincinnati**	Nippert Stadium • Cincinnati, OH	ESPN	**CIN** 52–3	37,978	
October 9	3:30 p.m.	No. 24 **SMU**	**Navy**	Navy–Marine Corps Memorial Stadium • Annapolis, MD (Gansz Trophy)	CBSSN	**SMU** 31–24	28,563	
October 9	6:00 p.m.	**East Carolina**	**UCF**	Bounce House • Orlando, FL	ESPN+	**UCF** 20–16	41,649	
October 9	9:00 p.m.	**Memphis**	**Tulsa**	H.A. Chapman Stadium • Tulsa, OK	ESPN2	**TLSA** 35–29	17,593	
^{#}Rankings from AP Poll released prior to game. All times are in Eastern Time.

Date	Bye Week
October 9	South Florida

==== Week Seven ====
Date	Time	Visiting team	Home team	Site	TV	Result	Attendance	Ref.
October 14	7:30 p.m.	**Navy**	**Memphis**	Liberty Bowl Memorial Stadium • Memphis, TN	ESPN	**MEM** 35–17	30,042	
October 16	Noon	**UCF**	No. 3 **Cincinnati**	Nippert Stadium • Cincinnati, OH (rivalry)	ABC	**CIN** 56–21	37,978	
October 16	Noon	**Tulsa**	**South Florida**	Raymond James Stadium • Tampa, FL	ESPNU	**TLSA** 32–31	21,767	
^{#}Rankings from AP Poll released prior to game. All times are in Eastern Time.

Date	Bye Week				
October 16	East Carolina	Houston	No. 23 SMU	Temple	Tulane

==== Week Eight ====
Date	Time	Visiting team	Home team	Site	TV	Result	Attendance	Ref.
October 21	7:30 p.m.	**Tulane**	No. 21 **SMU**	Gerald J. Ford Stadium • University Park, TX	ESPN	**SMU** 55–26	22,843	
October 22	7:00 p.m.	**Memphis**	**UCF**	Bounce House • Orlando, FL	ESPN2	**UCF** 24–7	39,328	
October 23	Noon	No. 2 **Cincinnati**	**Navy**	Navy–Marine Corps Memorial Stadium • Annapolis, MD	ESPN2	**CIN** 27–20	32,004	
October 23	7:00 p.m.	**Temple**	**South Florida**	Raymond James Stadium • Tampa, FL	ESPN+	**USF** 34–14	25,430	
October 23	9:20 p.m.	**East Carolina**	**Houston**	TDECU Stadium • Houston, TX	ESPNews ^{α}	**HOU** 31–24 ^{OT}	22,925	
^{#}Rankings from AP Poll released prior to game. All times are in Eastern Time.

- **^α** This game was initially scheduled for ESPNU at 4PM ET, but moved to 9:20PM ET on ESPNews because of a rain delay..

Date	Bye Week
October 23	Tulsa

==== Week Nine ====
Date	Time	Visiting team	Home team	Site	TV	Result	Attendance	Ref.
October 28	7:30 p.m.	**South Florida**	**East Carolina**	Dowdy–Ficklen Stadium • Greenville, NC	ESPN	**ECU** 29–14	32,015	
October 29	7:30 p.m.	**Navy**	**Tulsa**	H.A. Chapman Stadium • Tulsa, OK	ESPN2	**NAVY** 20–17	16,279	
October 30	Noon	**UCF**	**Temple**	Lincoln Financial Field • Philadelphia, PA	ESPN+	**UCF** 49–7	19,595	
October 30	Noon	No. 2 **Cincinnati**	**Tulane**	Yulman Stadium • New Orleans, LA	ESPN2	**CIN** 31–12	17,012	
October 30	7:00 p.m.	No. 19 **SMU**	**Houston**	TDECU Stadium • Houston, TX (rivalry)	ESPN2	**HOU** 44–37	25,676	
^{#}Rankings from AP Poll released prior to game. All times are in Eastern Time.

Date	Bye Week
October 30	Memphis

==== Week Ten ====
Date	Time	Visiting team	Home team	Site	TV	Result	Attendance	Ref.
November 6	Noon	No. 23 **SMU**	**Memphis**	Liberty Bowl Memorial Stadium • Memphis, TN	ESPNU	**MEM** 28–25	30,191	
November 6	3:00 p.m.	**Temple**	**East Carolina**	Dowdy–Ficklen Stadium • Greenville, NC	ESPN+	**ECU** 45–3	32,817	
November 6	3:30 p.m.	**Tulsa**	No. 2 **Cincinnati**	Nippert Stadium • Cincinnati, OH (College GameDay)	ESPN2	**CIN** 28–20	37,978	
November 6	3:30 p.m.	**Navy**	No. 8 Notre Dame	Notre Dame Stadium • Notre Dame, IN (rivalry)	NBC	**L** 6–34	77,096	
November 6	4:00 p.m.	**Tulane**	**UCF**	Bounce House • Orlando, FL	ESPNU	**UCF** 14–10	41,030	
November 6	7:30 p.m.	No. 20 **Houston**	**South Florida**	Raymond James Stadium • Tampa, FL	ESPNU	**HOU** 54–42	28,667	
^{#}Rankings from AP Poll released prior to game. All times are in Eastern Time.

==== Week Eleven ====
Date	Time	Visiting team	Home team	Site	TV	Result	Attendance	Ref.
November 12	6:00 p.m.	No. 2 **Cincinnati**	**South Florida**	Raymond James Stadium • Tampa, FL	ESPN2	**CIN** 48–28	30,708	
November 13	Noon	**UCF**	**SMU**	Gerald J. Ford Stadium • University Park, TX	ESPNU	**SMU** 55–28	23,175	
November 13	Noon	No. 17 **Houston**	**Temple**	Lincoln Financial Field • Philadelphia, PA	ESPN+	**HOU** 37–8	18,440	
November 13	Noon	**East Carolina**	**Memphis**	Liberty Bowl Memorial Stadium • Memphis, TN	ESPN+	**ECU** 30–29 ^{OT}	28,431	
November 13	4:00 p.m.	**Tulsa**	**Tulane**	Yulman Stadium • New Orleans, LA	ESPNU	**TLSA** 20–13 ^{OT}	22,784	
^{#}Rankings from AP Poll released prior to game. All times are in Eastern Time.

Date	Bye Week
November 13	Navy

==== Week Twelve ====
Date	Time	Visiting team	Home team	Site	TV	Result	Attendance	Ref.
November 19	9:00 p.m.	**Memphis**	No. 17 **Houston**	TDECU Stadium • Houston, TX	ESPN2	**HOU** 31–13	28,712	
November 20	Noon	**South Florida**	**Tulane**	Yulman Stadium • New Orleans, LA	ESPN+	**TULN** 45–14	14,496	
November 20	3:30 p.m.	**SMU**	No. 3 **Cincinnati**	Nippert Stadium • Cincinnati, OH	ESPN	**CIN** 48–14	37,978	
November 20	3:30 p.m.	**East Carolina**	**Navy**	Navy–Marine Corps Memorial Stadium • Annapolis, MD	CBSSN	**ECU** 38–35	28,001	
November 20	4:00 p.m.	UConn	**UCF**	Bounce House • Orlando, FL (Civil Conflict)	ESPN+	**W** 49–17	37,454	
November 20	4:00 p.m.	**Temple**	**Tulsa**	H.A. Chapman Stadium • Tulsa, OK	ESPN+	**TLSA** 44–10	16,731	
^{#}Rankings from AP Poll released prior to game. All times are in Eastern Time.

==== Week Thirteen ====
Date	Time	Visiting team	Home team	Site	TV	Result	Attendance	Ref.
November 26	3:30 p.m.	No. 4 **Cincinnati**	**East Carolina**	Dowdy–Ficklen Stadium • Greenville, NC	ABC	**CIN** 35–13	38,014	
November 26	3:30 p.m.	**South Florida**	**UCF**	Bounce House • Orlando, FL (War on I-4)	ESPN	**UCF** 17–13	41,157	
November 27	Noon	No. 19 **Houston**	UConn	Rentschler Field • East Hartford, CT	CBSSN	**W** 45–17	12,685	
November 27	Noon	**Navy**	**Temple**	Lincoln Financial Field • Philadelphia, PA	ESPNU	**NAVY** 38–14	16,708	
November 27	4:00 p.m.	**Tulsa**	**SMU**	Gerald J. Ford Stadium • University Park, TX	ESPN2	**TLSA** 34–31	17,158	
November 27	7:30 p.m.	**Tulane**	**Memphis**	Liberty Bowl Memorial Stadium • Memphis, TN	ESPNU	**MEM** 33–28	27,416	
^{#}Rankings from AP Poll released prior to game. All times are in Eastern Time.

==== Week Fourteen (American Athletic Conference Championship) ====
Date	Time	Visiting team	Home team	Site	TV	Result	Attendance	Ref.
December 4	4:00 p.m.	No. 16 **Houston**	No. 3 **Cincinnati**	Nippert Stadium • Cincinnati, OH	ABC	**CIN** 35–20	37,978	
^{#}Rankings from AP Poll released prior to game. All times are in Eastern Time.

==== Week Fifteen ====
Date	Time	Visiting team	Home team	Site	TV	Result	Attendance	Ref.
December 11	3:00 p.m.	**Navy**	Army	Metlife Stadium • East Rutherford, NJ (122nd Army-Navy Game/Commander-in-Chief's Trophy)	CBS	**W** 17–13	82,282	
^{#}Rankings from AP Poll released prior to game. All times are in Eastern Time.

== Postseason ==
=== Bowl games ===
In 2021 the American will send teams to the Military Bowl, Fenway Bowl, and Hawaii Bowl annually. The American will have four selections from the following bowls:Frisco Bowl, Cure Bowl, Boca Raton Bowl, Gasparilla Bowl. Birmingham Bowl, First Responder Bowl and Myrtle Beach Bowl. The American champion will go to a New Year's Six bowl if a team finishes higher than the champions of Group of Five conferences in the final College Football Playoff rankings. American teams are also eligible for the College Football Playoff if they're among the top four teams in the final CFP ranking.

==== Cancelled bowls ====
The following bowl games tied in with the American Athletic Conference had their 2021 editions canceled :

- **^A** Memphis was originally slated to play in the Hawaii Bowl against Hawaii on December 24. Hawaii was forced to withdraw from the bowl game due to a shortage of available players, stemming from a combination of a COVID-19 outbreak within the team, players already out with injury, and players who transferred away from the school at the conclusion of the regular season.
- **^B** East Carolina was originally slated to play in the Military Bowl against Boston College on December 27. On December 26 the game was cancelled after Boston College had over 40 players unavailable to play in the Military Bowl against East Carolina. In a statement, Boston College said it did not have enough players to field a team because of coronavirus issues, season-ending injuries, opt-outs and transfers.
- **^C** SMU was originally slated to play in the Fenway Bowl against Virginia on December 29. Virginia was forced to withdraw game due to the number of COVID cases impacting its roster, preventing safe participation. As a result of this withdrawal, the game and associated activities will no longer take place

Legend
American win
American loss

Bowl game	Date	Site	Television	Time (EST)	American team	Opponent	Score	Attendance
Myrtle Beach Bowl	December 20, 2021	Brooks Stadium • Conway, SC	ESPN	2:30 p.m.	Tulsa	Old Dominion	**W** 30–17	6,557
Gasparilla Bowl	December 23, 2021	Raymond James Stadium • Tampa, FL	ESPN	7:00 p.m.	UCF	Florida	**W** 29–17	63,669
Hawaii Bowl	December 24, 2021	Clarence T. C. Ching Athletics Complex • Honolulu, HI	ESPN	8:00 p.m.	Memphis	Hawaii	Cancelled^{A}	
Military Bowl	December 27, 2021	Navy–Marine Corps Memorial Stadium • Annapolis, MD	ESPN	2:30 p.m.	East Carolina	Boston College	Cancelled^{B}	
Birmingham Bowl	December 28, 2021	Protective Stadium • Birmingham, AL	ESPN	12:00 p.m.	No. 20 Houston	Auburn	**W** 17–13	47,100
Fenway Bowl	December 29, 2021	Fenway Park • Boston, MA	ESPN	11:00 a.m.	SMU	Virginia	Cancelled^{C}	
**College Football Playoff**
Cotton Bowl Classic	December 31, 2021	AT&T Stadium • Arlington, Texas	ESPN	3:30 p.m.	No. 4 Cincinnati	No. 1 Alabama	**L** 6–27	76,313

Rankings from Final CFP rankings. All times Eastern Time Zone. American teams bolded.

=== Selection of teams ===
- **Bowl-eligible** (7): Cincinnati, East Carolina, Houston, Memphis, SMU, UCF, Tulsa
- Bowl-ineligible: (4): Navy, South Florida, Temple, Tulane

== American vs other conferences ==
=== American vs Power Five matchups ===
The following games include American teams competing against Power Five conferences teams from the ACC, Big Ten, Big 12, BYU/Notre Dame, Pac-12 and SEC). All rankings are from the AP Poll at the time of the game.

Date	Conference	Visitor	Home	Site	Score
September 2	ACC	South Florida	NC State	Carter–Finley Stadium • Raleigh, NC	L 0–45
September 4	Big 12	Texas Tech	Houston	NRG Stadium • Houston, TX	L 21–38
September 4	Big Ten	Temple	Rutgers	SHI Stadium • Piscataway, NJ	L 14–61
September 4	Big 12	No. 2 Oklahoma	Tulane	Gaylord Family Oklahoma Memorial Stadium • Norman, OK	L 35–40
September 11	SEC	South Carolina	East Carolina	Dowdy–Ficklen Stadium • Greenville, NC	L 17–20
September 11	SEC	No. 13 Florida	South Florida	Raymond James Stadium • Tampa, FL	L 20–42
September 11	Big 12	Tulsa	Oklahoma State	Boone Pickens Stadium • Stillwater, OK	L 23–28
September 17	ACC	UCF	Louisville	Cardinal Stadium • Louisville, KY	L 35–42
September 18	Big Ten	No. 8 Cincinnati	Indiana	Memorial Stadium • Bloomington, IN	W 38–24
September 18	SEC	Mississippi State	Memphis	Liberty Bowl Memorial Stadium • Memphis, TN	W 31–29
September 18	ACC	Boston College	Temple	Lincoln Financial Field • Philadelphia, PA	L 3–28
September 18	SEC	Tulane	No. 17 Ole Miss	Vaught–Hemingway Stadium • Oxford, MS	L 21–61
September 18	Big Ten	Tulsa	No. 9 Ohio State	Ohio Stadium • Columbus, OH	L 20–41
September 25	Independent	South Florida	BYU	LaVell Edwards Stadium • Provo, UT	L 27–35
September 25	Big 12	SMU	TCU	Amon G. Carter Stadium • Fort Worth, TX	W 42–34
October 2	Independent	No. 7 Cincinnati	No. 9 Notre Dame	Notre Dame Stadium • Notre Dame, IN	W 24–13
November 6	Independent	Navy	Notre Dame	Notre Dame Stadium • Notre Dame, IN	L 6–34

=== American vs Group of Five matchups ===
The following games include American teams competing against teams from C-USA, MAC, Mountain West or Sun Belt.

Date	Conference	Visitor	Home	Site	Score
September 2	Sun Belt	East Carolina	Appalachian State	Bank of America Stadium • Charlotte, NC	L 19–33
September 4	Mountain West	Boise State	UCF	Bounce House • Orlando, FL	W 36–31
September 4	MAC	Miami (OH)	No. 8 Cincinnati	Nippert Stadium• Cincinnati, OH	W 49–14
September 4	C-USA	Marshall	Navy	Navy-Marine Corps Memorial Stadium • Annapolis, MD	L 7–49
September 11	C-USA	Houston	Rice	Rice Stadium • Houston, TX	W 44–7
September 11	Sun Belt	Memphis	Arkansas State	Centennial Bank Stadium • Jonesboro, AR	W 55–50
September 11	Mountain West	Air Force	Navy	Navy-Marine Corps Memorial Stadium • Annapolis, MD	L 3–23
September 11	C-USA	North Texas	SMU	Gerald J. Ford Stadium • University Park, TX	W 35–12
September 11	MAC	Temple	Akron	InfoCision Stadium • Akron, OH	W 45–24
September 18	C-USA	East Carolina	Marshall	Joan C. Edwards Stadium • Huntington, WV	W 42–38
September 18	C-USA	SMU	Louisiana Tech	Joe Aillet Stadium • Ruston, LA	W 39–37
September 25	C-USA	UTSA	Memphis	Liberty Bowl Memorial Stadium • Memphis, TN	L 28–31
September 25	C-USA	UAB	Tulane	Yulman Stadium • New Orleans, LA	L 21–28
September 25	Sun Belt	Arkansas State	Tulsa	H.A. Chapman Stadium • Tulsa, OK	W 41–34

=== American vs FBS independents matchups ===
The following games include American teams competing against FBS Independents, which includes Army, Liberty, New Mexico State, UConn or UMass.

Date	Visitor	Home	Site	Score
November 20	UConn	UCF	Bounce House • Orlando, FL	W 49–17
November 27	No. 19 Houston	UConn	Rentschler Field • East Hartford, CT	W 45–17
December 11	Army	Navy	MetLife Stadium • East Rutherford, NJ	W 17–13

=== American vs FCS matchups ===
The Football Championship Subdivision comprises 13 conferences and two independent programs.

Date	Visitor	Home	Site	Score
September 2	UC Davis	Tulsa	H.A. Chapman Stadium • Tulsa, OK	L 17–19
September 4	Abilene Christian	SMU	Gerald J. Ford Stadium • University Park, TX	W 56–9
September 4	Nicholls	Memphis	Liberty Bowl Memorial Stadium • Memphis, TN	W 42–17
September 11	Murray State	No. 7 Cincinnati	Nippert Stadium • Cincinnati, OH	W 42–7
September 11	Morgan State	Tulane	Legion Field • Birmingham, AL	W 69–20
September 11	Bethune-Cookman	UCF	Bounce House • Orlando, FL	W 63–14
September 18	Grambling State	Houston	TDECU Stadium • Houston, TX	W 45–0
September 18	Florida A&M	South Florida	Raymond James Stadium • Tampa, FL	W 38–17
September 25	Charleston Southern	East Carolina	Dowdy–Ficklen Stadium • Greenville, NC	W 31–28
September 25	Wagner	Temple	Lincoln Financial Field • Philadelphia, PA	W 41–7

=== Records against other conferences ===
Regular Season

Power 5 Conferences	Record
ACC	0–3
Big Ten	1–2
Big 12	1–3
BYU/Notre Dame	1–2
Pac-12	0–0
SEC	2–4
Power 5 Total	5–11
Other FBS Conferences	Record
C–USA	3–1
Independents (Excluding BYU & Notre Dame)	8–0
MAC	1–2
Sun Belt	2–0
Other FBS Total	14–3
FCS Opponents	Record
Football Championship Subdivision	9–1
Total Non-Conference Record	28–15

Post Season

Power Conferences 5	Record
ACC	0–0
Big Ten	0–0
Big 12	0–0
BYU/Notre Dame	0–0
Pac-12	0–0
SEC	2–1
Power 5 Total	2–1
Other FBS Conferences	Record
C–USA	1–0
Independents (Excluding BYU & Notre Dame)	0–0
MAC	0–0
Mountain West	0–0
Sun Belt	0–0
Other FBS Total	1–0
Total Bowl Record	3–1

== Awards and honors ==
=== Player of the week honors ===
Week	Offensive			Defensive			Specialist		
Week	Player	Team	Position	Player	Team	Position	Player	Team	Position
WEEK 1	Tanner Mordecai	SMU	QB	Kalia Davis	UCF	DL	Joe Doyle	Memphis	P
WEEK 2	Calvin Austin	Memphis	WR	William Kwenkeu	Temple	LB	Mannie Nunnery	Houston	LB
WEEK 3	Tanner Mordecai (2)	SMU	QB	Deshawn Pace	Cincinnati	LB	Calvin Austin	Memphis	WR
WEEK 4	Davis Brin	Tulsa	QB	Derek Parish	Houston	LB	Marcus Jones	Houston	CB
WEEK 5	Desmond Ridder	Cincinnati	QB	Taylor Robinson	Navy	S	Marcus Jones (2)	Houston	CB
WEEK 6	Jerome Ford	Cincinnati	RB	Tatum Bethune	UCF	LB	Bryan Massey	SMU	S
WEEK 7	Jerome Ford (2)	Cincinnati	RB	Justin Wright	Tulsa	LB	Brian Battie	South Florida	RB
WEEK 8	Tanner Mordecai (3)	SMU	QB	Donavan Mutin	Houston	LB	Marcus Jones (3)	Houston	CB
WEEK 9	Nathaniel Dell	Houston	WR	Malik Fleming	East Carolina	CB	Marcus Jones (4)	Houston	CB
WEEK 10	Clayton Tune	Houston	QB	Rodney Owens	Memphis	CB	Brian Battie (2)	South Florida	RB
WEEK 11	Tanner Mordecai (4)	SMU	QB	Justin Wright (2)	Tulsa	LB	Owen Daffer	East Carolina	K
WEEK 12	Desmond Ridder (2)	Cincinnati	QB	Marcus Jones	Houston	CB	Owen Daffer (2)	East Carolina	K
WEEK 13	Seth Henigan	Memphis	QB	Sauce Gardner	Cincinnati	CB	David Kemp	Memphis	K

=== American Athletic Individual Awards ===
The following individuals received postseason honors as chosen by the league's head coaches.

Award	Player	School
Offensive Player of the Year	Desmond Ridder	Cincinnati
Defensive Player of the Year	Sauce Gardner*	Cincinnati
Special Teams Player of the Year	Marcus Jones	Houston
Rookie of the Year	Alton McCaskill	Houston
Coach of the Year	Luke Fickell	Cincinnati

=== All-Conference Teams ===
Position	Player	Team
First Team Offense
WR	Nathaniel Dell	Houston
WR	Calvin Austin *	Memphis
WR	Danny Gray	SMU
OT	Dylan O’Quinn	Cincinnati
OT	Patrick Paul	Houston
OG	Lorenz Metz	Cincinnati
OG	Dylan Parham	Memphis
C	Jake Renfro	Cincinnati
TE	Sean Dykes	Memphis
QB	Desmond Ridder	Cincinnati
RB	Jerome Ford	Cincinnati
RB	Keaton Mitchell	East Carolina
First Team Defense
DL	Big Kat Bryant	UCF
DL	Curtis Brooks	Cincinnati
DL	Myjai Sanders *	Cincinnati
DL	David Anenih	Houston
DL	Logan Hall	Houston
LB	Darrian Beavers	Cincinnati
LB	Joel Dublanko	Cincinnati
LB	JJ Russell	Memphis
LB	Diego Fagot	Navy
CB	Sauce Gardner *	Cincinnati
CB	Coby Bryant	Cincinnati
S	Bryan Cook	Cincinnati
S	Gervarrius Owens	Houston
First Team Special Teams
K	Owen Daffer	East Carolina
P	Ryan Wright	Tulane
RS	Marcus Jones	Houston

Position	Player	Team
Second Team Offense
WR	Ryan O’Keefe	UCF
WR	Alec Pierce	Cincinnati
WR	Tyler Snead	East Carolina
OT	Alan Ali	SMU
OT	Tyler Smith	Tulsa
OT	Lokahi Pauole	UCF
OG	Demetris Harris	South Florida
OG	Hayden Howerton	SMU
C	Kody Russey	Houston
TE	Grant Calcaterra	SMU
QB	Tanner Mordecai	SMU
RB	Alton McCaskill	Houston
RB	Ulysses Bentley IV	SMU
Second Team Defense
DL	John Tate IV	Memphis
DL	Derek Parish	Houston
DL	Elijah Chatman	SMU
DL	Jaxon Player	Tulsa
LB	Bruce Bivens	East Carolina
LB	Donavan Mutin	Houston
LB	Antonio Grier	South Florida
LB	Delano Robinson	SMU
CB	Ja'Quan McMillian	East Carolina
CB	Marcus Jones	Houston
S	Divaad Wilson	UCF
S	Quindell Johnson	Memphis
Second Team Special Teams
K	Bijan Nichols	Navy
P	Jonn Young	East Carolina
RS	Bryan Massey	SMU

* Denotes Unanimous Selection

All Conference Honorable Mentions:

- UCF: Tatum Bethune (LB), Cole Schneider (OG), Marcus Tatum (OT)
- Cincinnati: Marcus Brown (DL), Deshawn Pace (LB), Josh Whyle (TE)
- Houston: Laine Wilkins (P)
- South Florida: Jaren Mangham (RB), Spenser Shrader (P)
- SMU: Rashee Rice (WR)
- Temple: C.J. Perez (C)
- Tulane: Sincere Haynesworth (C), Dorian Williams (LB), Macon Clark (S)
- Tulsa: Chris Paul (OG), Justin Wright (LB)

=== All-Americans ===
The 2021 College Football All-America Team is composed of the following College Football All-American first teams chosen by the following selector organizations: Associated Press (AP), Football Writers Association of America (FWAA), American Football Coaches Association (AFCA), Walter Camp Foundation (WCFF), Sporting News (TSN, from its historic name of The Sporting News), Sports Illustrated (SI), The Athletic (Athletic), USA Today (USAT) ESPN, CBS Sports (CBS), College Football News (CFN), Athlon Sports, Phil Steele, and Fox Sports (FOX).

Currently, the NCAA compiles consensus all-America teams using a point system computed from All-America teams named by coaches associations or media sources. Players are chosen against other players playing at their position only. To be selected a consensus All-American, players must be chosen to the first team on at least half of the five official selectors as recognized by the NCAA. Second- and third-team honors are used to break ties. Players named first-team by all five selectors are deemed unanimous All-Americans. Currently, the NCAA recognizes All-Americans selected by the AP, AFCA, FWAA, TSN, and the WCFF to determine consensus and unanimous All-Americans.

Position	Player	School	Selector	Unanimous	Consensus
First Team All-Americans
CB	Sauce Gardner	Cincinnati	(AFCA, AP, CBS, ESPN, FWAA, The Athletic, TSN, USAT)		*
CB	Coby Bryant	Cincinnati	(AFCA, WCFF)		
DB	Marcus Jones	Houston	(AP)		
AP	Marcus Jones	Houston	(CBS, ESPN, FWAA, The Athletic, TSN, USAT)		*
KR	Brian Battie	South Florida	(FWAA, WCFF)		*

Position	Player	School	Selector
Second Team All-Americans
CB	Coby Bryant	Cincinnati	(AP, CBS, TSN, USAT)
CB	Sauce Gardner	Cincinnati	(WCFF)
CB	Ja'Quan McMillian	East Carolina	(AP, FWAA, TSN)
PR	Marcus Jones	Houston	(AP, CBS, WCFF)
KR	Brian Battie	South Florida	(CBS, TSN)

==== List of All American Teams ====
- American Football Coaches Association All-America Team
- Associated Press All-America Team
- CBS Sports All-America Team
- ESPN All-America Team
- Football Writers Association of America All-America Team
- The Athletic All-America Team
- The Sporting News 2021 College Football All-America Team
- USA Today All-America Team
- Walter Camp Football Foundation All-America Team

=== National award winners ===
Home Depot Coach of the Year Award
Luke Fickell, Cincinnati

Eddie Robinson Coach of the Year
Luke Fickell, Cincinnati

Bobby Dodd Coach of the Year
Luke Fickell, Cincinnati

AFCA Coach of Year
Luke Fickell, Cincinnati

Bear Bryant Award
Luke Fickell, Cincinnati

Paul Hornung Award
Marcus Jones, Houston

Jim Thorpe Award
Coby Bryant, Cincinnati

Jet Award
Marcus Jones, Houston

== NFL draft ==
The following list includes all AAC players who were drafted in the 2022 NFL draft.

Player	Position	School	Draft Round	Round Pick	Overall Pick	Team
Sauce Gardner	CB	Cincinnati	1	4	4	New York Jets
Tyler Smith	OT	Tulsa	1	24	24	Dallas Cowboys
Logan Hall	DT	Houston	2	1	33	Tampa Bay Buccaneers
Alec Pierce	WR	Cincinnati	2	21	53	Indianapolis Colts
Bryan Cook	S	Cincinnati	2	30	62	Kansas City Chiefs
Desmond Ridder	QB	Cincinnati	3	10	74	Atlanta Falcons
Marcus Jones	DB	Houston	3	21	85	New England Patriots
Dylan Parham	OG	Memphis	3	26	90	Las Vegas Raiders
Myjai Sanders	DE	Cincinnati	3	36	100	Arizona Cardinals
Danny Gray	WR	SMU	3	41	105	San Francisco 49ers
Coby Bryant	CB	Cincinnati	4	4	109	Seattle Seahawks
Calvin Austin	WR	Memphis	4	33	138	Pittsburgh Steelers
Damarion Williams	CB	Houston	4	36	141	Baltimore Ravens
Jerome Ford	RB	Cincinnati	5	13	156	Cleveland Browns
Darrian Beavers	LB	Cincinnati	6	3	182	New York Giants
Grant Calcaterra	TE	SMU	6	20	198	Philadelphia Eagles
Curtis Brooks	DT	Cincinnati	6	38	216	Indianapolis Colts
Kalia Davis	DT	UCF	6	42	220	San Francisco 49ers
Chris Paul	OG	Tulsa	7	9	230	Washington Commanders
