= Jim Steeg =

American sports executive (born 1950)

Jim Steeg (born November 29, 1950, in Boston, Massachusetts) is an American sports executive. He is considered throughout the National Football League (NFL) as the individual most responsible for growing the Super Bowl into the most popular one-day sporting event in the world.

He has been organizing and managing sports events across various leagues. He has been the Chairman of the athlifefoundation.org since 2016 and currently serves as a special marketing advisor to the University of North Carolina Women’s Soccer Team.

== Personal life ==
He was born in Boston and raised in Ft. Wayne, earned a bachelor's degree in political science from Miami University in Ohio and an MBA from Wake Forest. He is married to Jill Lieber an author of two books and 3-time Pulitzer Prize nominated writer with Sports illustrated and USA Today.

== Career ==
Steeg began his career in football in 1975 as the chief accountant for the Miami Dolphins, earning an annual salary of US$12,000 (equivalent to $71,800 in 2025).

=== Super Bowl ===
In 1979, he joined the National Football League as the Director of Administration, overseeing the Super Bowl and the draft. His tenure at the NFL lasted until 2005, leaving as Senior Vice President of Special Events.

In his 26 years with the National Football League (NFL), he was responsible for numerous innovations, including the introduction of celebrity national anthem performances, superstar halftime shows, and corporate hospitality villages, and managed all aspects of the Super Bowl, including site selection, stadium preparation, concerts, accommodations, hospitality, broadcasting, transportation, security, design, ticketing, events, and local community relations, overseeing up to 10,000 employees on site.

He also managed Super Bowl charitable events that raised more than US$50 million for host communities and children. He also implemented the NFL's Super Bowl Minority and Women-Owned Emerging Business Program in the early 1990s.

Steeg introduced key Super Bowl elements, including Jumbotron screens, enhanced-audio TV broadcasts, TV access at concessions, entertainment plazas, corporate hospitality villages, and environmental recycling.

Steeg has guest lectured and taught at universities including UNC Chapel Hill, NC State, Wake Forest, San Diego State, Stanford, and UC Berkeley. From 2017 to 2019 Steeg taught “Contemporary Issues in American Sports” at Duke University’s OsherLifelong Learning Institute.

=== NFL ===
In his 35 years with the National Football League (NFL) managed all aspects of the Super Bowl, including site selection, stadium preparation, shows, accommodations, hospitality, broadcasting, transportation, security, design, ticketing, events, and local community relations, overseeing up to 10,000 employees on site.

He chaired the NFL planning of the 75th anniversary celebration, which included the first use of throwbacks uniforms. He revamped the Pro Bowl in Honolulu starting in 2000 and spearheaded the international expansion of the NFL by organizing American Bowl games in Berlin and Barcelona in the early 1990’s. He organized the NFL kickoff events in Times Square in 2002 and the Washington Mall in 2003. He oversaw the NFL/Senior PGA tour event as well as the Quarterback Challenge. He served as an instant replay official in the mid 1980’s.

=== San Diego Chargers ===
From November 2004 until April 2010, Steeg was the executive vice president and chief operating officer of the NFL's San Diego Chargers, where he was in charge of all business operations for the team. and Mexico, as well as improved Chargers' alumni relations.

During his tenure, the team's revenue streams grew through sponsorships, stadium concessions, merchandise and parking, as well as record sales of tickets, club seats and suites. Under his watch, the Chargers were the first NFL team to experiment with Kangaroo TV (FanVision) and WiseDV. On March 31, 2010, Steeg left the Chargers to pursue career in consulting.

=== Miami Dolphins ===
His career started with the Miami Dolphins where he started as chief accountant. He oversaw all aspects of the front office and game day operations. He negotiated contracts for the Orange Bowl, concessions, preseason games scheduling, team travel, television, radio, players and coaches. He instigated group sales programs, the first Hispanic radio broadcast, professional cheerleaders, and returned Flipper to the Orange Bowl.

He worked with the Miami Toros which became the Fort Lauderdale Strikers organizing the move to Tamiami Stadium and then Lockhart Stadium overseeing administration and operations for the team. Currently he work as a sports advisory to entities such as the NHL, Pac-12, USC, UCLA, and the Rose Bowl. He directed the inaugural Pac-12 Football Championship Game and chaired the USFL Advisory Board. He was appointed by Mayor Kevin Faulconer to San Diego's Citizens Stadium Advisory Group (CSAG) in 2015 that identified a site and financing plan for a new football stadium in 110 days. He is on the advisory board of Pacific Pro Football, a developmental football league that has not yet launched.

== Volunteer Boards ==
He was co-chair of the Special Events Committee for the 2008 United States Open golf tournament at Torrey Pines in LaJolla, California.He has served on the boards of the Downtown YMCA of San Diego, the Make A Wish Foundation of San Diego, and the University of San Diego Athletic Department Executive Cabinet.

He has served on the boards of the San Diego Regional Chamber of Commerce, the United Way of San Diego, Hunger Related Events, Saddlebrook Resorts and the Babcock School at Wake Forest. He was instrumental in raising funds for the Ramsey (N.J.) High School Athletic Department.

== Awards ==
In 2002, Steeg was honored as a member of the inaugural class of the Special Events Hall of Fame. In 2005, he was recognized as the Hoosier Celebrity of the Year by the Mad Anthony's, a charitable organization in Fort Wayne, Ind. In 2008, he received the Pete Rozelle Award from the New Orleans Touchdown Club. He was selected to the DeMolay Hall of Fame in 2015 and the Phi Delta Theta Sports Hall of Fame the same year. Sports Business Journal recognized Steeg as part of its prestigious 2020 Class of The Champions: Pioneers and Innovators in Sports Business.

The Athletic named him one the 100 most important individuals in the history of the National Football League.
