= Don Yee =

American lawyer

Donald H. Yee
- Born: 1960 (age 65–66); Sacramento, California, U.S.
- Education: University of California, Los Angeles; University of Virginia School of Law
- Occupations: Sports agent, lawyer

Donald H. Yee (born 1960) is an American lawyer and sports agent. He is a partner of Yee & Dubin, a sports talent agency. He represents National Football League players and coaches, including former quarterback Tom Brady, Los Angeles Rams quarterback Jimmy Garoppolo, former New England Patriots wide receiver Julian Edelman, and Denver Broncos head coach Sean Payton. He has been highly praised by media including Sports Illustrated and The Washington Post for his work in representing Brady.

== Early life and education ==
Yee grew up in Sacramento, California, into an immigrant Chinese-American family. His mother was not able to speak English. As a 13-year-old in 1974, he worked as a batboy for the Sacramento Solons, the city's then minor league baseball team. In an interview with Sactown Magazine, he recalls the influence of the baseball team's manager, Bob Lemon, who taught Yee that he shouldn't "pay attention to what others think. Just do your best, and do what you think is right". He graduated from Sacramento High School in 1978. Yee went to college at UCLA, during which he interned at Sacramento's KFBK radio station as a producer for a nightly sports talk show. He obtained a Los Angeles Lakers season credential and covered parts of Magic Johnson's rookie season of 1979-80. Yee graduated from the University of Virginia School of Law in 1987.

== Career ==
Yee decided to become a sports agent in 1988, which the Sacramento Bee described as a long shot, similar to someone "marching into Hollywood hopeful his manuscript would be snatched up". His big break came in 1999, when he signed Tom Brady, a senior at University of Michigan who went on to spend more than 20 years as an NFL quarterback for the New England Patriots and Tampa Bay Buccaneers. Yee represented Brady for his entire career.

Brady has praised Yee as "a great advisor for me. He's always been focused on football. When I got out of college and was looking for someone to represent me, there were a lot of options. He was someone that really had the same goal where I could find the right spot and my career could flourish ... Whatever your personal goals were, he would support that. [Yee wasn't interested] necessarily in the goals of what an agent may be, but what your goals may be. My goal has always been winning and he's tried to support that in the best way he could and that's why I have so much respect for him." During the Deflategate controversy, The Boston Globe described Yee as Brady's "chief surrogate" and "uber-agent", while The Washington Post called him Brady's "super agent".

Yee also represents Jimmy Garoppolo, a former Patriots quarterback who is now with the Los Angeles Rams. Analysts pointed out a potential conflict of interest, given that both Brady and Garoppolo were quarterbacks on the same team, citing NFLPA and the ABA's Model Rules of Professional Conduct. Others said that Yee's representation of both athletes may have "complicated" efforts by the Patriots to retain both Brady and Garoppolo. Yee also represents former Patriots wide receiver Julian Edelman.

Yee has been described as a "megaphone for players' rights" and has publicly taken controversial opinions in the sports world. In 2002, he advocated eliminating the NFL draft, saying that all it does is "help unproven players establish a market value when they've contributed nothing to the league and their production is speculative at best". He argued in a 2010 op-ed in The Washington Post that college football players should be paid, arguing that it would "implement an honest approach to the combination of big-time football and higher education, an approach that eliminates the NCAA's notion of amateurism". In 2017, Yee co-founded the Pacific Pro Football league, an alternative to college football, with funding from angel investors.
