= Steeg (surname) =

Steeg is a surname. Notable people with the surname include:

- Hanne Steeg (born 1965), West German speed skater
- Jim Steeg (born 1950), American sports executive
- Ludwig Steeg (1894–1945), German politician
- Théodore Steeg (1868–1950), French politician, lawyer, and professor
