= Pacific Pro Football =

Proposed professional developmental American football league

- Classification: Developmental
- Sport: American football
- Founded: 2017
- Founder: Don Yee; Ed McCaffrey; Jeff Husvar; John Chung; Lisa McCaffrey
- First season: 2020 (planned)
- CEO: Jamie Hemann
- Commissioner: Ed McCaffrey
- No. of teams: 4 (planned)
- Country: US
- Sponsor: Adidas
- Related competitions: HUB Football
- Website: pacificprofootball.com

Pacific Pro Football, also called Pacific Pro League (Pac Pro), was a planned professional American football development league. The league was to be a single entity, owning all the teams, and have played during summers from July to August. The league was planning to start play in July 2020. As of January 2019, the league's advisory board consisted of Mike Shanahan, Jim Steeg, Mike Pereira, Baron Flenory, and Steve Schmidt.

League plans were abandoned as of May 2020, and reformatted to a scouting event called HUB Football.

== Background ==
Don Yee, best known as the sports agent for Tom Brady, has advocated for years for college football players to be paid, particularly via a 2010 op-ed in The Washington Post. Yee would have "football corporations" purchase college football programs through bids leading to the end of the NCAA, with colleges focusing on education. Yee and other sports agents saw that young players were not being served by the existing college football system.

== History ==
The league was announced by Yee on January 11, 2017. The league had planned to start recruiting in 2017 and then play in the summer of 2018 with four teams. The league's COO Bradley Edwards indicated that they had closed a round of angel investing; although as of May 2017, the league was looking for additional investors.

By February 2018, the league pushed its start back to the summer of 2019, and signed on Adidas as a major sponsor. Jamie Hemann was hired in December 2018 as CEO, to start on January 1, 2019. Also revealed at the time was that the league start had been pushed back to July 2020. On January 7, 2019, it was announced that former NFL player Ed McCaffrey would serve as commissioner. The July 2020 date for launch of the league was also reaffirmed. On September 25–27, 2019 the Pac Pro held their official event, a three-day workout called "Scrimmage" which was an invitation-only camp.

On May 4, 2020, Sports Business Journal reported that Yee abandoned current business-to-consumer model for the league while drawing up a new business-to-business model for the renamed league.

== Players ==
The league would only hire non-NFL eligible players, thus focused on high school graduates not going to college nor out of school for over three years. Average pay would be $50,000 plus optional community college tuition and books for a year. Benefits would also be a part of compensation, including career-ending injury coverage. A set of programs and internships, academic and vocational, would be made available through the league. The players, as professionals, would be able to enter into sponsorship deals. The league would train the players in pro-style play. All players would get playing time, with players assigned to the team closest to their high school.

== Structure ==
The four teams of 50 players each would be based in southern California four major counties Los Angeles, Ventura, Orange County and San Diego, playing in mid-size municipal or college stadiums on Sundays. The league might have used only two venues. The season would consist of eight games for each team, plus a two-round playoff. The league planned to have eight full-time coaches and eight part-time assistant coaches per team. The league would also serve as a training ground for future NFL staff.

The league's plans were to expand to 12 teams by 2025, first by four teams on the East Coast after year three, and later to four more teams on a different location.

== Pacific Pro Scrimmage ==
On September 25–27, 2019 the Pac Pro held their first official event, a three-day workout called "Scrimmage" an invitation-only camp, at Whittier College in Whittier, California. The scrimmage was targeted to scouts from the NFL, XFL and CFL. Four NFL teams, Browns, 49ers, Rams and Chargers, were confirmed as attending. They featured "approximately 20" players with no punters, kickers or long snappers. Yee envisions it being a yearly event then growing into an ongoing regular season combine.

In the inaugural camp, players received coaching from former NFL quarterback Ty Detmer and longtime NFL and college coaches Dwaine Board (defensive line), Dave Magazu (offensive line), Geep Chryst (Wide Receivers), Steve Logan (Quarterbacks), Jimmy Williams (Defensive Backs) and Rick Minter (Linebackers).

Notable Attendees:

- Chad Kanoff, QB, Signed by Tampa Bay Buccaneers and later by the XFL.
- Devin Ross, WR, Signed by New England Patriots.
- Darion Clark, TE, Signed by Chicago Bears.
- Jordan Harold, DL, Signed by Calgary Stampeders.
- Kenneth Olugbode, LB, Signed by BC Lions.
- Malcolm Washington, DB, Signed by Edmonton Eskimos.
- Logan Tulley-Tillman, OL, Drafted by DC Defenders in the 2020 XFL draft.

== HUB Football ==
After league plans were abandoned, Yee announced his initiative was to be reformatted to a scouting event called HUB Football. It was later announced that he teamed with former ESPN and NFL Network executive Jamie Hemann.

The scouting event was to be divided to two separate events: The CAMP, an invitation-only non-contact football camp for street free agents, and the GAME, a game week practice with an exhibition game at the end (modeled after the Senior Bowl). Players will not be compensated, in attempt to attract college players and allow them to retain NCAA eligibility.

Per HUB website, they "maintained direct relationships with professional football league offices and teams and will share player data, video and whatever is necessary to enhance the exposure of The CAMP players and provide an additional platform to secure their next professional football opportunity".

On October 13, 2022, HUB Football signed an exclusive partnership agreement with the United States Football League. On June 25, 2023, Yee announced that he pulled the plug on current HUB Football operations, while Senior Vice President of Football Operations, Tom Goodhines, will start his own scouting event called GRID Camps.

By the end, HUB Football did not conduct games, while players participated in non-contact football camps only, as each player paid $750 to participate.

=== Coaches ===
- Head coach: Geep Chryst
- Quarterbacks coach: Ty Detmer
- Quarterbacks coach: Seneca Wallace
- Wide Receivers Coach: Wendell Davis
- Wide Receivers Coach: Az-Zahir Hakim
- Running backs coach: Wayne Moses
- Offensive line coach: Eugene Chung (formerly Dave Magazu)
- Defensive line coach: Dwaine Board
- Linebackers/Defensive line coach: Marvin Jones
- Linebackers coach: Sam Anno
- Linebackers coach: Junior Bryant
- Defensive backs coach: Tim McTyer
- Defensive backs coach: Derrick Gardner
- Special teams coach: Nick Novak

==== Portal CAMP coaches ====
- Head coach: Eugene Chung (also Offensive line)
- Quarterbacks coach: John DeFilippo
- Running backs coach: Kirby Wilson
- Wide Receivers Coach: DJ McCarthy
- Defensive line coach: Phillip Daniels
- Linebackers coach: Sam Anno
- Defensive backs coach: John Guy

=== Pro "CAMP" events ===
According to their records since its inception in 2019, as 47 players out of 212 participants have signed with professional teams, and since 2021 seven attendees signed with NFL teams.

- September 2020 "CAMP" - Chad Kanoff, Graham Adomitis, Devonte Williams and Xavier Smith.
- November 2020 "CAMP" - 59 players were invited to the 2nd. "CAMP" including: Brian Lewerke, Shane Ray, Deondre Francois and Connor Davis.
- March 2021 "CAMP" - 57 players were invited to at Maranatha Christian Schools in San Diego including: McLeod Bethel-Thompson, Josh Love, Ryan Willis, Chad Kanoff, Ade Aruna, Ahmad Gooden, Nigel Harris, Quentin Poling, Prince Charles Iworah, Brandon Aubrey and Tadhg Leader.
- April 2021 "CAMP" - More than 50 prospects participated at "THE CAMP" in La Mesa, California including: Deondre Francois, Tyler Bray, Quinton Flowers, Miles Shuler and Kai Higgins.
- July 2021 "CAMP" - 67 prospects participated at "THE CAMP" in Helix High School at La Mesa, California including: Tyler Bray, Jordan Matthews and Rahim Moore.
- September 2021 "CAMP" - 71 players participated at "THE CAMP" in Dignity Health Sports Park at Carson, California including: Case Cookus, Johnathan Cyprien and Brandon Marshall.
- October 2021 "CAMP" - 52 prospects participated at "THE CAMP" in Carson, California including: Anthony Gordon, Patrick Carr, Trevor Davis and David Irving.
- December 2021 "CAMP" - The event took place at Southwestern College in Chula Vista, California with: QB Zachary Smith, QB Richard Stammetti, OL Cordel Iwuagwu, DE Deshon Cooper and LS Ryan Navarro.
- March 2022 "CAMP" - The event, officially titled "‘CAMP’ 11" took place at Southwestern College in Chula Vista, California with: RB Derrius Guice, RB Pete Guerriero and S Alijah Holder.
- May 2022 "CAMP" - The event, officially titled "‘CAMP’ 12" took place at Helix Charter High School stadium in La Mesa, California with: OL Luke Juriga and LB Ty Schwab.
- June 2022 "CAMP" - The event, officially titled "‘CAMP’ 13" took place in San Diego, California with: RB Rakeem Boyd and S Javon Jackson.
- November 2022 "CAMP" - The event, first since announcing a new Scouting Data Partnership with the USFL, took place in San Diego, California with: QB Chris Barrett, TE Connor Davis, TE Stephen Carlson, TE Cameron Butler and S Glenn Harris.
- February 2023 "CAMP" - The 58-players "CAMP" took place in San Diego, California with: QB Roland Rivers III, RB Marcel Dancy, WR Trevon Sidney, TE Josh Ealy, LB Patrick Isbell, CB Anthony Blue and DB Traveon Beck.
- April 2023 "CAMP" - The 42-players "CAMP" took place in San Diego, California with: QB Zach Smith, TE Darion Clark, OT Henry Hattis, DL Devin Drew and DB Ezekiel Brown.
