= Bryan Cook (American football) =

American football player (born 1999)

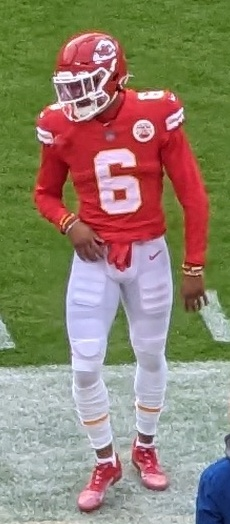

No. 6 – Cincinnati Bengals
- Position: Safety
- Roster status: Active

Personal information
- Born: September 7, 1999 (age 27); Cincinnati, Ohio, U.S.
- Listed height: 6 ft 1 in (1.85 m)
- Listed weight: 206 lb (93 kg)

Career information
- High school: Mount Healthy (Mount Healthy, Ohio)
- College: Howard (2017–2018); Cincinnati (2019–2021)
- NFL draft: 2022: 2nd round, 62nd overall pick

Career history
- Kansas City Chiefs (2022–2025); Cincinnati Bengals (2026–present)

Awards and highlights
- 2× Super Bowl champion (LVII, LVIII); First-team All-AAC (2021)

Career NFL statistics as of Week 10, 2026
- Total tackles: 284
- Sacks: 1.5
- Forced fumbles: 1
- Fumble recoveries: 3
- Pass deflections: 15
- Interceptions: 3
- Defensive touchdowns: 1
- Stats at Pro Football Reference

Bryan Cook (born September 7, 1999) is an American professional football safety for the Cincinnati Bengals of the National Football League (NFL). He played college football for the Howard Bison before transferring to the Cincinnati Bearcats.

== Early life ==
Cook grew up in Cincinnati, Ohio and attended Mount Healthy High School in Mount Healthy, Ohio. As a senior, he was named first-team All-Southwest Ohio Conference after recording 35 tackles, three interceptions, and a fumble recovery in nine games on defense and catching four passes for 110 yards and three touchdowns on offense. Cook was lightly recruited and committed to play college football at Howard University, which was his only scholarship offer.

== College career ==
Cook began his collegiate career playing for the Howard Bison. He played in 21 games at cornerback over two seasons for Howard and had 93 tackles, five tackles for a loss, two forced fumbles, and two fumble recoveries, with 17 passes defended and five interceptions, one of which he returned for a 41-yard touchdown. After his sophomore season, Cook entered the NCAA transfer portal and transferred to continue his collegiate career at University of Cincinnati.

Cook sat out the regular season of his first year with the Cincinnati Bearcats per NCAA transfer rules. During his redshirt year he was moved from cornerback to safety. Cook played in the 2020 Birmingham Bowl following the end of the regular season. He had 26 tackles with two passes broken up in his first full season at Cincinnati. As a senior, Cook 96 tackles, five tackles for loss, and one sack with 9 passes defended and two interceptions and was named first-team All-American Athletic Conference.

== Professional career ==
=== Pre-draft ===
He attended the NFL Scouting Combine, but opted to not participate in any physical exercises or drills due to a shoulder injury. Kevin Hanson of Sports Illustrated ranked Cook as the seventh best safety prospect in the draft. NFL media analyst Daniel Jeremiah ranked him as the eighth best safety (116th overall) in the draft. Zach Patraw of Sports Illustrated had Cook ranked sixth among all safety prospects. Cory Giddings of Bleacher Report ranked Cook seventh (91st overall) amongst all safety prospects in the draft. NFL draft analysts projected Cook to be selected in the third or fourth round of the 2022 NFL Draft.

"Cook is one of the most reliable tacklers in this draft class with his ability to come to balance on the move, maintain a wide stance and strike low and physical through his target. In coverage, he has the athleticism and awareness to stay on top of routes, although he can be better with his body positioning downfield. Overall, Cook has room to raise his consistency level in coverage, but he is an above-average run defender with the physical traits and overachieving attitude to see the field early and often in the NFL.”

— Dane Brugler (NFL analyst for the Athletic)

Pre-draft measurables
Height	Weight	Arm length	Hand span	Wingspan
6 ft 0 3/4 in (1.85 m)	206 lb (93 kg)	31 7/8 in (0.81 m)	8 1/2 in (0.22 m)	6 ft 6 in (1.98 m)
All values from NFL Combine

=== Kansas City Chiefs ===
==== 2022 ====
The Kansas City Chiefs selected Cook in the second round (62nd overall) of the 2022 NFL draft. He was the sixth safety drafted in 2022. The Chiefs selected him to provide depth following the departures of Tyrann Mathieu and Daniel Sorensen. He was also the second of three Cincinnati defensive backs drafted along with first round pick (4th overall) Sauce Gardner and fourth round pick (102nd overall) Coby Bryant.

External videos
- Chiefs select Bryan Cook No. 62
- Bryan Cook gets the call from the Chiefs

"He was a small-school kid that transferred to Cincinnati and prior to the Combine, we loved his tape and loved his makeup. Unbelievable interview at the Combine. Super smart.”

— Brett Veach (Chiefs' General Manager)

On May 6, 2022, the Kansas City Chiefs signed Cook to a four–year, $5.84 million rookie contract that includes $2.40 million guaranteed upon signing and an initial signing bonus of $1.43 million.

Throughout training camp, he competed to be the primary backup safety against veteran Deon Bush under defensive coordinator Steve Spagnuolo. Head coach Andy Reid named him a backup and listed him as the second strong safety on the depth chart to begin the season, with Justin Reid and Juan Thornhill listed as the starting safeties.

On September 11, 2022, Cook made his professional regular season debut in the Kansas City Chiefs' season-opener at the Arizona Cardinals, but was limited to one solo tackle as they won 44–21. In Week 4, he set a season-high with five combined tackles (two solo) and had one pass deflection during a 41–31 victory at the Tampa Bay Buccaneers. The following week, Cook had two tackles before exiting during the fourth quarter of a 30–29 win against the Las Vegas Raiders on Monday Night Football in Week 5. It was reported he has sustained a concussion and he was inactive during a 20–24 loss against the Buffalo Bills in Week 6 as he remained in concussion protocol. In Week 12, Cook earned his first career start in place of Juan Thornhill who was inactive due to a calf injury and had two solo tackles and made his first career sack on Bryce Perkins for a five–yard loss as the Chiefs defeated the Los Angeles Rams 26–10. He finished his rookie season with a total of 33 combined tackles (22 solo), two pass deflections, and one sack in 16 games and one start. He received an overall grade of 64.3 from Pro Football Focus as a rookie in 2022.

==== 2022 Playoffs/Super Bowl LVII ====
The Kansas City Chiefs finished the 2022 NFL season first in the AFC West with a 14–3 record to earn a first-round bye. On January 21, 2023, Cook appeared in the first postseason game of his career and had one solo tackle in the Chiefs' 27–20 win against the Jacksonville Jaguars in the Divisional Round. The following game, he had four solo tackles and deflected a pass to teammate Joshua Williams for an interception in the fourth quarter as the Chiefs defeated the Cincinnati Bengals 23–20 in the AFC Championship Game. On February 12, 2023, Cook played in Super Bowl LVII, but was limited to one solo tackle in the Chiefs 38–35 win over the Philadelphia Eagles.

==== 2023 ====
During training camp, Cook competed to be a starting safety against Mike Edwards and Chamarri Conner following the departure of Juan Thornhill. Head coach Andy Reid named him the starting strong safety to begin the season and paired him with free safety Justin Reid.

External videos
- 59-yard TD return scored by Bryan Cook

On September 7, 2023, Cook started in the Kansas City Chiefs' home-opener against the Detroit Lions and set a season-high with seven combined tackles (four solo) during their 20–21 loss. On October 22, 2023, Cook made five combined tackles (three solo), one pass deflection, and sealed a 31–17 victory against the Los Angeles Chargers after making his first career interception on a pass by Justin Herbert to wide receiver Keenan Allen with 1:10 remaining in the fourth quarter. In Week 9, he had four combined tackles (two solo) and scored the first touchdown of his career after returning a fumble during a 14–21 win against the Miami Dolphins in Frankfurt, Germany. He scored his touchdown in the second quarter after quarterback Tua Tagovailoa threw a pass to wide receiver Tyreek Hill who would fumble the ball after Trent McDuffie forced the fumble by Hill that went on to be recovered and returned 6-yards by safety Mike Edwards until he was tackled by Tyreek Hill. But before being tackled, Edwards lateraled the ball to Cook who returned it the last 40–yards into the endzone for a touchdown. In Week 13, Cook tied his season-high of seven combined tackles (six solo) before exiting during the third quarter of a 19–27 loss at the Green Bay Packers after injuring his ankle when it was bent backwards as he tackles running back A. J. Dillon following a 14–yard rush. On December 9, 2023, the Chiefs officially placed him on injured reserve due to his ankle injury for the remaining five games of the season (Weeks 14–18). He finished the season with 42 combined tackles (26 solo), two pass deflections, one interception, and a touchdown in 12 games and 12 starts. Pro Football Focus had Cook finish the season with an overall grade of 65.2 in 2023.

==== 2023 Playoffs/Super Bowl LVIII ====
The Kansas City Chiefs went on to finish the 2023 NFL season a top the AFC West with a 11–6 record without Cook for the last five games. While on injured reserve, the Chiefs defeated the Miami Dolphins 26–7 in the Wild-Card Game, the Buffalo Bills 27–24 in the Divisional Round, and won the AFC Championship Game 17–10 at the Baltimore Ravens to advance to the Super Bowl. On February 11, 2024, the Kansas City Chiefs defeated the San Francisco 49ers in overtime 25–22 in Super Bowl LVIII.

==== 2024 ====
He entered training camp slated as the de facto starting strong safety. He began the season as a starting safety and was again paired with Justin Reid. In Week 3, he set a season-high with eight combined tackles (six solo) and one pass deflection during a 22–17 victory at the Atlanta Falcons. On October 7, 2024, Cook made two solo tackles, set a season-high with two pass deflections, and intercepted a pass by Derek Carr to wide receiver Rashid Shaheed during a 26–13 win against the New Orleans Saints. In Week 15, he had three solo tackles, a pass deflection, and set a new career-high with his second interception of the season after picking off a pass by Jameis Winston to wide receiver Elijah Moore during a 21–7 win at the Cleveland Browns. He started all 17 games for the first time in his career and had a total of 78 combined tackles (55 solo), five pass deflections, and two interceptions. He received an overall grade of 63.7 from Pro Football Focus, which ranked 85th among 171 qualifying safeties in 2024.

==== 2024 Playoffs/Super Bowl LIX ====
The Kansas City Chiefs finished the 2024 NFL season with a 15–2 record and placed first in the AFC West to clinch a first-round bye. On January 18, 2025, Cook started for the first time in career in a playoff game and made six combined tackles (five solo) as the Chiefs won 23–14 in the Divisional Round against the Houston Texans. The following game, the Chiefs defeated the Buffalo Bills 32–29 in the AFC Championship Game. On February 9, 2025, Cook started in Super Bowl LIX and made four combined tackles (three solo), one pass deflection, and intercepted a pass attempt thrown by Jalen Hurts to wide receiver A. J. Brown as the Chiefs lost the Super Bowl 40–22 against the Philadelphia Eagles.

=== Cincinnati Bengals ===
On March 12, 2026, Cook signed a three-year, $40.25 million contract with the Cincinnati Bengals. In Week 3 while playing against the Pittsburgh Steelers, Cook suffered an injury to his right ankle. Cook was rendered limited, being absent during week 4 before returning to play in Week 5 against the Miami Dolphins.

== NFL career statistics ==
Legend
	Won the Super Bowl
	Led the league
**Bold**	Career high

=== Regular season ===
Year	Team	Games		Tackles					Interceptions						Fumbles				
Year	Team	GP	GS	Cmb	Solo	Ast	Sck	TFL	Int	Yds	Avg	Lng	TD	PD	FF	Fum	FR	Yds	TD
2022	KC	16	1	33	22	11	**1.0**	**1**	0	0	0.0	0	0	2	0	0	0	0	0
2023	KC	12	12	42	26	16	0.0	**1**	1	**9**	**9.0**	**9**	0	2	0	0	**2**	**59**	**1**
2024	KC	17	17	78	**55**	23	0.0	**1**	**2**	0	0.0	0	0	5	0	0	0	0	0
2025	KC	17	17	**85**	50	**35**	0.0	**1**	0	0	0.0	0	0	**6**	0	0	0	0	0
2026	CIN	8	8	46	30	16	0.5	0	0	0	0.0	0	0	0	1	0	1	0	0
Career		70	55	284	183	101	1.5	4	3	9	3.0	9	0	15	1	0	3	59	1

=== Postseason ===
Year	Team	Games		Tackles					Interceptions						Fumbles				
Year	Team	GP	GS	Cmb	Solo	Ast	Sck	TFL	Int	Yds	Avg	Lng	TD	PD	FF	Fum	FR	Yds	TD
2022	KC	3	0	6	6	0	0.0	0	0	0	0.0	0	0	**1**	0	0	0	0	0
2024	KC	3	3	**13**	**11**	**2**	0.0	0	**1**	0	0.0	0	0	**1**	0	0	0	0	0
Career		6	3	19	17	2	0.0	0	1	0	0.0	0	0	2	0	0	0	0	0
