= Darion Clark =

American football player (born 1994)

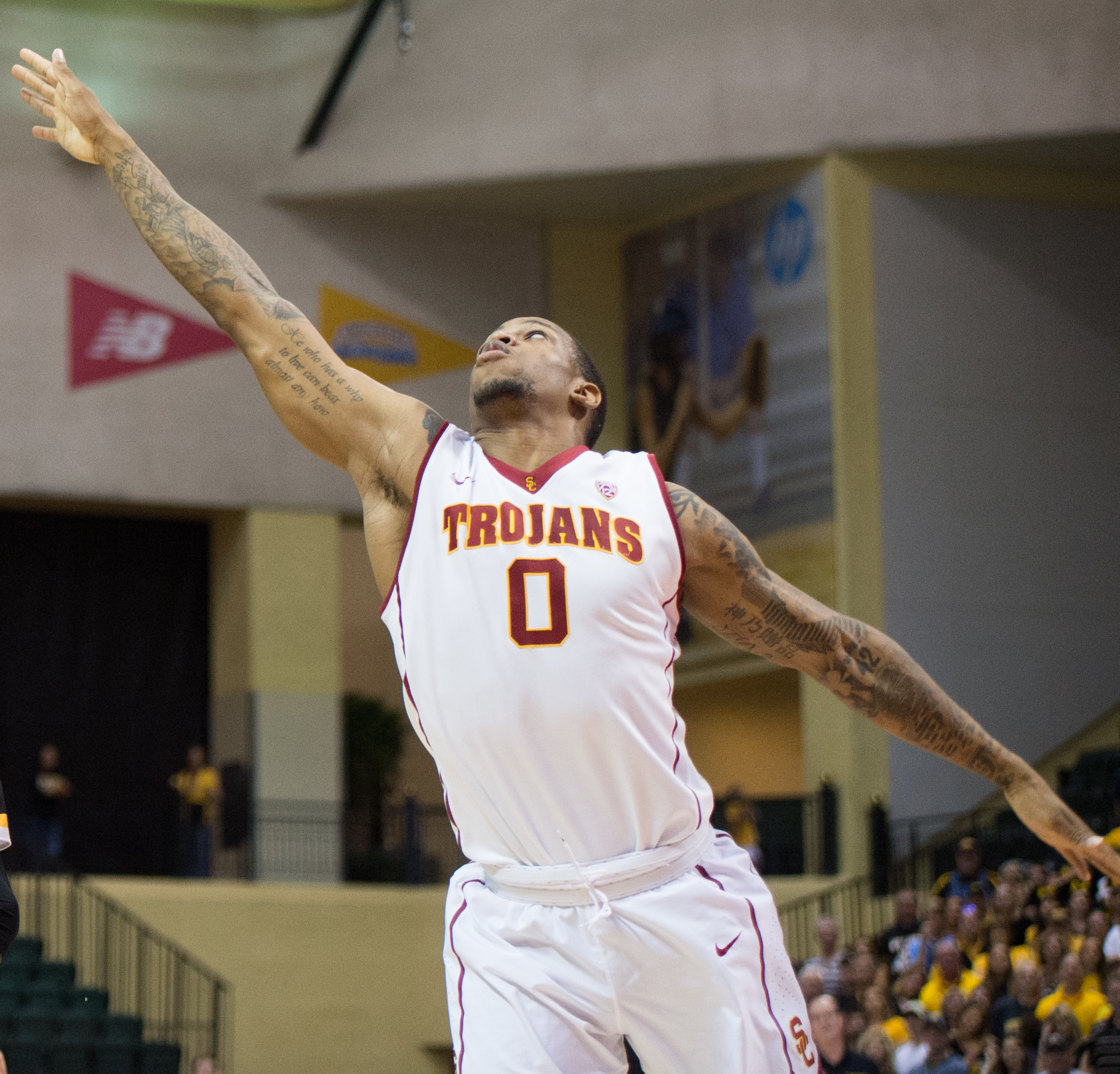
- Clark playing for USC

Profile
- Position: Tight end

Personal information
- Born: April 9, 1994 (age 32); Conyers, Georgia
- Listed height: 6 ft 7 in (2.01 m)
- Listed weight: 235 lb (107 kg)

Career information
- High school: Oak Hill Academy (Mouth of Wilson, Virginia)
- College: USC
- NFL draft: 2018: undrafted

Career history
- Chicago Bears (2020)

Darion Clark (born April 9, 1994) is an American football tight end. He played college basketball at the University of Southern California.

== Early life ==
Clark attended Oak Hill Academy in Mouth of Wilson, Virginia. He played basketball in high school with Oak Hill Academy's basketball prep program.

== College career ==
In college, he played basketball with the Charlotte 49ers as a freshman in the 2012–13 season. Then, he transferred to USC and played two seasons, 2014–15 and 2015–16, and transferred again as a senior to Grand Canyon Antelopes men's basketball and played for them in the 2016–17 season. When he was in USC, he used to hang out a lot with the USC football team and said he began to miss it, he said "I began thinking about football all the time, and then I began having dreams, where I was playing football very vividly". Before he went to Grand Canyon, he seriously considered joining the USC football team, but had shoulder surgery so he played his last season at Grand Canyon.

== Professional career ==
Clark started football camp in January 2018 and attended the USC Pro Day in March 2018, but wasn't drafted in the 2018 NFL draft. He was invited to the New York Jets rookie minicamp in April of that year, but was not signed afterwards. Clark also attended the Spring League 2019 season and later the Pacific Pro Scrimmage where he received invitations to workout with the Indianapolis Colts and the Chicago Bears.

=== Chicago Bears ===
On January 6, 2020, Clark signed a reserve/future contract with the Chicago Bears. He was waived/injured by the team on August 25, 2020, with a shoulder injury, and subsequently reverted to the team's injured reserve list the next day. He was waived on June 13, 2021.
