= Quindell Johnson =

American football player (born 1999)

Profile
- Position: Safety

Personal information
- Born: November 5, 1999 (age 27); New Orleans, Louisiana, U.S.
- Listed height: 6 ft 0 in (1.83 m)
- Listed weight: 208 lb (94 kg)

Career information
- High school: Edna Karr (New Orleans)
- College: Memphis (2018–2022)
- NFL draft: 2023: undrafted

Career history
- Los Angeles Rams (2023)*; Chicago Bears (2023); Los Angeles Rams (2024)*; San Francisco 49ers (2025)*; Pittsburgh Steelers (2025)*; Louisville Kings (2026); Washington Commanders (2026)*
- * Offseason or practice squad member only

Awards and highlights
- UFL champion (2026); First team All-AAC (2022); Second-team All-AAC (2021)

Career NFL statistics as of 2025
- Tackles: 3
- Pass deflections: 1
- Interceptions: 1
- Stats at Pro Football Reference

Quindell Johnson (born November 5, 1999) is an American professional football safety. Johnson played college football for the Memphis Tigers and has been a member of the Los Angeles Rams, Chicago Bears, San Francisco 49ers, Pittsburgh Steelers, and Washington Commanders. He also won the 2026 UFL championship with the Louisville Kings.

== Early life and education ==
Johnson was born on November 5, 1999. He and his twin brother Kendell grew up playing on the same youth sports teams, attending the same schools and ultimately playing for the same college football team. He attended Edna Karr High School and helped them win back-to-back state championships in 2016 and 2017. He committed to play college football for the Memphis Tigers, redshirting as a true freshman.

Following his redshirt season, Johnson saw significant playing time in 2019 and totaled 58 tackles, two interceptions and four pass breakups. In 2020, he earned second-team all-conference honors after having 81 total tackles, two forced fumbles and leading the American Athletic Conference (AAC) with 60 solo stops. He started all 12 games in 2021 and had 104 tackles, earning second-team all-conference honors while ranking 12th nationally with 66 solo stops. Johnson returned for a final season in 2022 and had a conference-leading four interceptions that placed him 22nd nationally; he additionally posted 77 tackles, four pass breakups and two forced fumbles on his way to being named first-team All-AAC. He finished his collegiate career with 320 tackles, 24 pass breakups and 10 interceptions.

== Professional career ==
Pre-draft measurables
Height	Weight	Arm length	Hand span	Wingspan	40-yard dash	10-yard split	20-yard split	20-yard shuttle	Vertical jump	Broad jump
6 ft 0 1/8 in (1.83 m)	201 lb (91 kg)	33 in (0.84 m)	9 1/2 in (0.24 m)	6 ft 5 in (1.96 m)	4.55 s	1.58 s	2.53 s	4.24 s	32.5 in (0.83 m)	10 ft 0 in (3.05 m)
All values from Pro Day

=== Los Angeles Rams ===
After going unselected in the 2023 NFL draft, Johnson was signed by the Los Angeles Rams as an undrafted free agent. He was waived during final roster cuts, on August 29, 2023.

=== Chicago Bears ===
On August 30, 2023, Johnson was claimed off waivers by the Chicago Bears after not making the final roster of the Rams.

August 26, 2024, Johnson was waived by the Bears and re-signed to the practice squad, but released the following day.

=== Los Angeles Rams (second stint) ===
On September 18, 2024, Johnson was signed to the Los Angeles Rams practice squad. He was released on January 7, 2025.

=== San Francisco 49ers ===
On January 21, 2025, Johnson signed a reserve/future contract with the San Francisco 49ers. He was waived by San Francisco on May 13.

=== Pittsburgh Steelers ===
On June 4, 2025, Johnson signed with the Pittsburgh Steelers. He was released by Pittsburgh on August 22.

=== Louisville Kings ===
On January 14, 2026, Johnson was selected by the Louisville Kings of the United Football League (UFL). He was released on February 9 and re-signed on April 7.

=== Washington Commanders ===
On August 25, 2026, Johnson signed with the Washington Commanders on a one-year deal. On August 30, he was waived by Washington as a part of final roster cuts before the start of the regular season.
