= Coby Bryant =

American football player (born 1999)

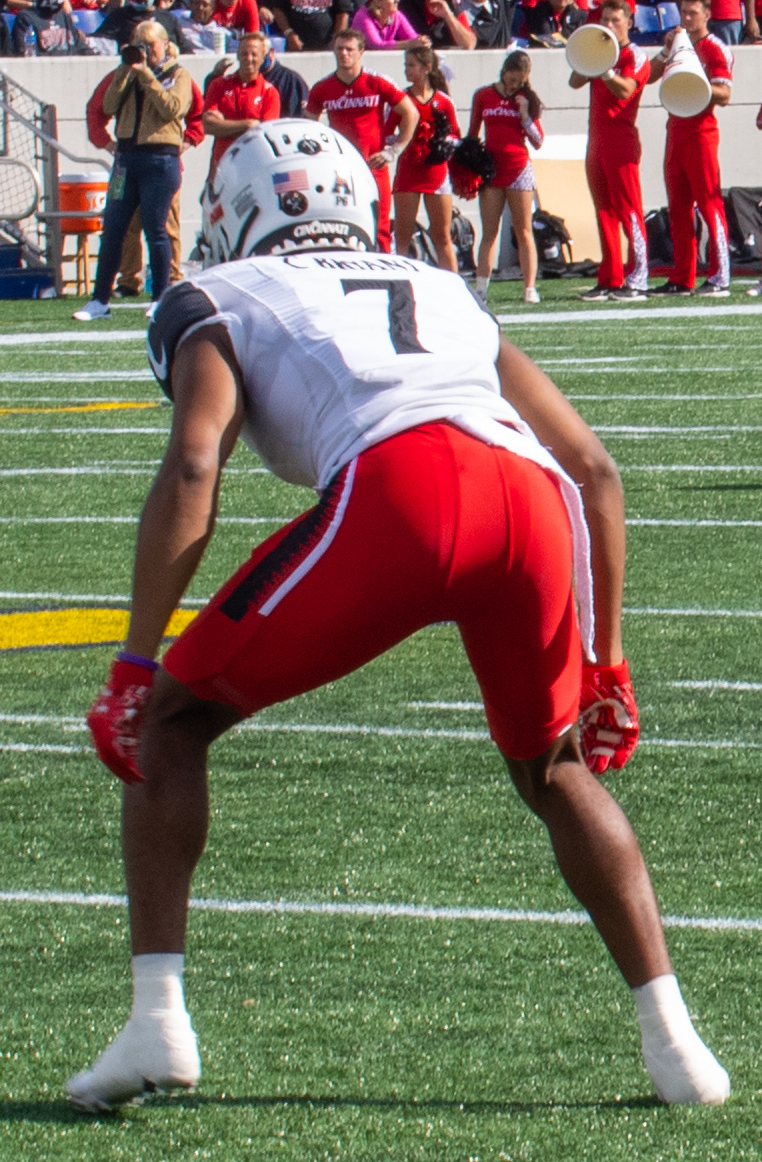
- Bryant with the Cincinnati Bearcats in 2021

No. 2 – Chicago Bears
- Position: Safety
- Roster status: Injured reserve

Personal information
- Born: March 29, 1999 (age 27); Cleveland, Ohio, U.S.
- Listed height: 6 ft 1 in (1.85 m)
- Listed weight: 193 lb (88 kg)

Career information
- High school: Glenville (Cleveland)
- College: Cincinnati (2017–2021)
- NFL draft: 2022: 4th round, 109th overall pick

Career history
- Seattle Seahawks (2022–2025); Chicago Bears (2026–present)

Awards and highlights
- Super Bowl champion (LX); Jim Thorpe Award (2021); First-team All-American (2021); 2× First-team All-AAC (2020, 2021)

Career NFL statistics as of Week 6, 2026
- Total tackles: 227
- Sacks: 2
- Forced fumbles: 7
- Pass deflections: 17
- Interceptions: 7
- Defensive touchdowns: 1
- Stats at Pro Football Reference

Coby Bryant (born March 29, 1999) is an American professional football safety for the Chicago Bears of the National Football League (NFL). He played college football for the Cincinnati Bearcats.

== Early life ==
Bryant grew up in Cleveland, Ohio, and attended Glenville High School.

== College career ==
Bryant mostly played on special teams during his freshman season. He was named a starter going into his sophomore year and had 33 tackles and two interceptions. Bryant finished his junior season with 54 tackles, eight passes broken up and one interception. Bryant was named first-team All-American Athletic Conference (AAC) as a senior. After considering entering the 2021 NFL draft, Bryant decided to utilize the extra year of eligibility granted to college athletes who played in the 2020 season due to the coronavirus pandemic and return to Cincinnati for a fifth season. Bryant repeated as a first-team All-AAC selection as a senior and was named the winner of the Jim Thorpe Award.

== Professional career ==
=== Pre-draft ===
Cory Giddings of Bleacher Report ranked Bryant as the eighth best cornerback prospect (63rd overall) in the draft. Dane Brugler of the Athletic and ESPN analyst Mel Kiper Jr. had Bryant ranked as the 10th best cornerback draft prospect. Kevin Hanson of Sports Illustrated ranked him as the 17th best cornerback prospect in the draft. He was ranked as the 18th best cornerback in the draft by Pro Football Focus. NFL draft analysts and scouts projected him to be selected in the third or fourth round of the 2022 NFL draft.

External videos
- Coby Bryant runs 4.54s 40-yard dash

Pre-draft measurables
Height	Weight	Arm length	Hand span	Wingspan	40-yard dash	10-yard split	20-yard split	20-yard shuttle	Three-cone drill	Vertical jump	Broad jump	Bench press
6 ft 1 3/8 in (1.86 m)	193 lb (88 kg)	30 5/8 in (0.78 m)	9 3/8 in (0.24 m)	6 ft 1 5/8 in (1.87 m)	4.48 s	1.56 s	2.62 s	4.33 s	7.31 s	33.0 in (0.84 m)	10 ft 2 in (3.10 m)	17 reps
All values from NFL Combine/Pro Day

=== Seattle Seahawks ===
==== 2022 ====
The Seattle Seahawks selected Bryant in the fourth round (109th overall) of the 2022 NFL draft. They originally acquired the pick in a trade in 2020 with the New York Jets along with Jamal Adams. He was the 13th cornerback selected in 2022 and was the first of two cornerbacks drafted by the Seahawks, along with their fifth round pick (153rd overall) Tariq Woolen. They were drafted to provide depth at the position following the departure of D. J. Reed. He was also the third Cincinnati defensive back selected following first round pick (4th overall) Sauce Gardner and second round pick (62nd overall) Bryan Cook.

External videos
- Seahawks select Coby Bryant No. 109
- Coby Bryant gets the draft call at No. 109

On July 26, 2022, the Seattle Seahawks signed Bryant to a four–year, $4.46 million rookie contract that includes an initial signing bonus of $807,804.

Throughout training camp, he competed to be a starting cornerback against Sidney Jones, Justin Coleman, Tre Brown, Artie Burns, and fellow rookie Tariq Woolen under defensive coordinator Clint Hurtt. He also competed to be the starting nickelback against Justin Coleman. Head coach Pete Carroll named him a backup cornerback and listed him as fifth on the depth chart to begin the season, behind starting duo Tariq Woolen and Michael Jackson Sr. and primary backups Justin Coleman and Sidney Jones.

On September 12, 2022, Bryant made his professional regular season debut during the Seattle Seahawks' home-opener against the Denver Broncos, but did not record a stat with only two snaps on defense as they won 17–16. After Week 1, Bryant became the starting nickelback after Justin Coleman injured his calf and was inactive for the next four games (Weeks 2–5). In Week 2, he recorded five combined tackles (four solo) during a 7–27 loss at the San Francisco 49ers. The following week, Bryant had one solo tackle and had his first career sack on quarterback Marcus Mariota for a six–yard loss as the Seahawks lost 23–27 to the Atlanta Falcons in Week 3. On October 2, 2022, Bryant earned his first career start at nickelback and had six combined tackles (three solo) during a 48–45 victory at the Detroit Lions. In Week 6, he set a season-high with eight combined tackles (six solo) during a 19–9 win against the Arizona Cardinals. He finished his rookie season with a total of 70 combined tackles (52 solo), four passes defended, four forced fumbles, and two sacks while appearing in all 17 games with six starts. He received an overall grade of 58.9 from Pro Football Focus as a rookie in 2022.

The Seattle Seahawks finished the 2022 NFL season second in the NFC West with a 9–8 record to earn a playoff berth. On January 14, 2023, Bryant appeared in the first postseason game of his career, but was limited to one solo tackle as the Seahawks lost the NFC Wild-Card Game 23–41 at the San Francisco 49ers.

==== 2023 ====
Heading into training camp, Bryant was projected to be a backup and was a possible candidate for the job as the starting nickelback after the Seahawks drafted Devon Witherspoon in the first round (fifth overall) of the 2023 NFL draft. Head coach Pete Carroll named Bryant as the starting nickelback and listed him as the third cornerback on the depth chart to start the season, behind starters Tariq Woolen and Devon Witherspoon.

On September 10, 2023, Bryant started in the Seattle Seahawks' home-opener against the Los Angeles Rams and set a season-high with nine combined tackles (seven solo) as they lost 13–30. On October 14, 2023, the Seahawks officially placed Bryant on injured reserve after he injured the same toe he had previously injured during the off-season. On November 23, 2023, the Seahawks activated him from injured reserve and added him back to their active roster after he was inactive for eight consecutive games (Weeks 3–11). He finished the 2023 NFL season with only 18 combined tackles (14 solo) in nine games and two starts.

==== 2024 ====
On January 31, 2024, the Seahawks announced the hiring of Baltimore Ravens' defensive coordinator Mike Macdonald as their new head coach. Under new defensive coordinator Aden Durde, Bryant fully transitioned from cornerback to free safety after he began to learn the position during training camp in 2023. He moved to safety following the departures of Quandre Diggs and Jamal Adams that also coincided with the Seahawks drafting cornerbacks Nehemiah Pritchett and D. J. James in the 2024 NFL draft. Throughout training camp, he competed to be the starting free safety against Rayshawn Jenkins and K'Von Wallace. Bryant began the season as a backup safety behind starting safety duo Rayshawn Jenkins and Julian Love.

Bryant became the starting free safety beginning in Week 7 after Jenkins was placed on injured reserve due to a hand injury. On October 20, 2024, Bryant earned his first start at free safety and set a season-high with 11 combined tackles (seven solo), made one pass deflection, and had his first career interception on a pass attempt thrown by Kirk Cousins to tight end Kyle Pitts during a 34–14 victory at the Atlanta Falcons. On November 24, 2024, Bryant made six solo tackles, one pass deflection, and scored his first career touchdown on a pick-six after picking off a pass attempt by Kyler Murray to wide receiver Michael Wilson and returned it for a 69–yard touchdown in the third quarter of a 6–16 win against the Arizona Cardinals. His performance earned him NFC Defensive Player of the Week for Week 12. He finished the 2024 NFL season with a total of 73 combined tackles (48 solo), six pass deflections, three interceptions, and one touchdown in 17 games and 11 starts. He received an overall grade of 72.8 from Pro Football Focus in 2024.

==== 2025 ====
On September 25, 2025, Bryant recorded an interception against the Cardinals in the first quarter, only to fumble the ball after being hit by Tyrice Knight, resulting in the ball being recovered by Trey Benson, for a 15 yard gain.

Bryant had four total tackles in Super Bowl LX, a 29–13 win over the New England Patriots.

=== Chicago Bears ===
On March 11, 2026, Bryant signed a three-year, $40 million contract with the Chicago Bears. On August 7, Bryant underwent knee surgery, which caused him to be placed on injured reserve on September 1.

== NFL career statistics ==
Legend
	Won the Super Bowl
**Bold**	Career high

=== Regular season ===
Year	Team	Games		Tackles					Interceptions					Fumbles				
Year	Team	GP	GS	Cmb	Solo	Ast	Sck	TFL	Int	Yds	Lng	TD	PD	FF	Fmb	FR	Yds	TD
2022	SEA	**17**	6	70	**52**	18	**2.0**	**4**	0	0	0	0	4	**4**	0	0	0	0
2023	SEA	9	2	18	14	4	0.0	0	0	0	0	0	0	1	0	0	0	0
2024	SEA	**17**	11	**73**	48	25	0.0	1	3	**87**	**69**	**1**	6	1	0	0	0	0
2025	SEA	15	**15**	66	39	**27**	0.0	**4**	**4**	43	28	0	**7**	1	**1**	0	0	0
2026	CHI	0	0	0	0	0	0.0	0	0	0	0	0	0	0	0	0	0	0
Career		58	34	227	153	74	2.0	9	7	130	69	1	17	7	1	0	0	0

=== Postseason ===
Year	Team	Games		Tackles					Interceptions					Fumbles				
Year	Team	GP	GS	Cmb	Solo	Ast	Sck	TFL	Int	Yds	Lng	TD	PD	FF	Fmb	FR	Yds	TD
2022	SEA	1	0	1	1	0	0.0	0	0	0	0	0	0	0	0	0	0	0
2025	SEA	**3**	**3**	**10**	**8**	**2**	0.0	0	0	0	0	0	**2**	0	0	0	0	0
Career		4	3	11	9	2	0.0	0	0	0	0	0	2	0	0	0	0	0

== Personal life ==
Bryant was named after the basketball player Kobe Bryant but his parents changed the spelling for uniqueness. He is the younger brother of former NFL safety Christian Bryant. He wore jersey number 8 in Seattle as a tribute to the late NBA star.
