= Jill Lieber Steeg =

American journalist

Jill Lieber Steeg is an American sports journalist and investigative reporter known for her work with Sports Illustrated and USA Today. She has been nominated for the Pulitzer Prize three times and has won two National Magazine Awards.

== Early life and education ==
She was born in Neenah, Wisconsin, where she graduated as valedictorian of Neenah High School in 1974. During her high school she was active in track and field, French Club, swinging strings, and cheerleading.

She attended Stanford University, where she became the first female sports editor of The Stanford Daily and earned a bachelor's degree in Communication in 1978; At Stanford, she wrote for the San Francisco Chronicle, Palo Alto Times, and the Associated Press.

== Career ==
Steeg began her career at the Milwaukee Sentinel in 1978, where she was one of the youngest female sports columnists in the country. She covered various topics, including the 1980 Winter Olympics in Lake Placid and Olympic sports at the University of Wisconsin. 1981, she became the first woman to cover professional sports full-time for Sports Illustrated. Her investigative journalism at Sports Illustrated included stories such as the Pete Rose gambling scandal and George Steinbrenner's reinstatement to baseball. She received two National Magazine Awards for her reporting. Steeg wrote news features on NFL figures throughout her career, including Don Shula, Lawrence Taylor, Dan Hampton, Marcus Allen, Joe Montana, Ronnie Lott, and Bruce Matthews.

Steeg's assignments extended to cover Super Bowls, Pro Bowls, NFC and AFC Championships, NFL Owners' Meetings, NCAA Tournaments, Final Fours, and the Indianapolis 500.

From 1995 to 2008, Steeg worked as a senior writer for USA Today, specializing in investigative pieces and profiles of athletes, including her profile on Jerry and Jeanie Buss. Her work included coverage of sporting events like the Super Bowl, the Olympics, and the World Series. She was twice nominated for the Pulitzer Prize during her time at USA Today. In 2008, Steeg co-founded Steeg Sports Management and Media Consulting, where she has worked on various multimedia projects, including books, documentaries, and social media campaigns. She co-authored the sports memoir Misty: Digging Deep in Volleyball and Life with three-time Olympic gold medalist Misty May-Treanor and has edited several health and wellness books. Her investigative projects include coverage of NFL star Junior Seau's suicide, which became the most-read story on the San Diego Union Tribune's website in 2012.

She exposed Pete Rose's gambling scandal, leading to his lifetime ban from baseball, and contributed to uncovering the George Steinbrenner scandal. Steeg also broke stories on NFL steroid use through Steve Courson's admission and wrote a first-person account of Mickey Mantle’s battle with alcoholism.

== Personal life ==
Lieber Steeg is married to Jim Steeg, a longtime NFL executive who oversaw the Super Bowl and special events for the league. The couple was married at Fenway Park in Boston, Massachusetts. They live in Chapel Hill, with their two dogs Fenway and Lambeau.

== Awards ==
- Three-time Pulitzer Prize nominee (for investigative and feature writing).
- National Magazine Awards for investigations into the Pete Rose gambling scandal and George Steinbrenner's reinstatement.
- APSE awards for various stories, including coverage of the Junior Seau suicide and NCAA athletes.
- 2000 Women’s Sports Foundation’s Journalism Award for a feature story on Martina Navratilova.
- Neenah Joint School District Hall of Fame.

== Publications ==
- May-Treanor, Misty; Steeg, Jill Lieber (2010). Misty: digging deep in volleyball and life (1st ed.). New York: Scribner. ISBN 978-1-4391-4854-9. OCLC 464593370.
- Total Impact: Straight Talk from Pro Football’s Hardest Hitter (1990) with Ronnie Lott.
