= Kalia Davis =

American football player (born 1998)

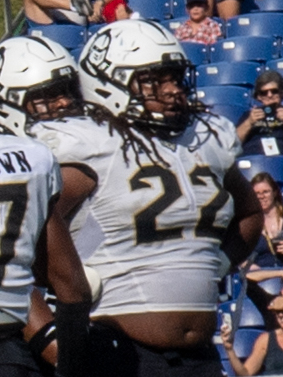
- Davis with UCF in 2021

No. 93 – Cleveland Browns
- Position: Defensive tackle
- Roster status: Injured reserve

Personal information
- Born: October 2, 1998 (age 28); Pensacola, Florida, U.S.
- Listed height: 6 ft 2 in (1.88 m)
- Listed weight: 310 lb (141 kg)

Career information
- High school: West Florida Tech (Pensacola)
- College: UCF (2017–2021)
- NFL draft: 2022: 6th round, 220th overall pick

Career history
- San Francisco 49ers (2022–2025); Cleveland Browns (2026–present)

Awards and highlights
- Colley Matrix national champion (2017)

Career NFL statistics as of 2025
- Total tackles: 41
- Sacks: 1.5
- Pass deflections: 4
- Interceptions: 1
- Stats at Pro Football Reference

Kalia Davis (born October 2, 1998) is an American professional football defensive tackle for the Cleveland Browns in the National Football League (NFL). He played college football for the UCF Knights.

== Professional career ==
Pre-draft measurables
Height	Weight	Arm length	Hand span	Wingspan	Bench press
6 ft 1 in (1.85 m)	302 lb (137 kg)	33 5/8 in (0.85 m)	9 1/2 in (0.24 m)	6 ft 8 in (2.03 m)	30 reps
All values from NFL Combine/Pro Day

=== San Francisco 49ers ===
Davis was selected by the San Francisco 49ers in the sixth round, 220th overall, of the 2022 NFL draft. On June 2, 2022, Davis was signed to his rookie deal, a four-year contract with a total value of over $3.8 million. He was placed on the reserve/non-football injury list on August 23.

On August 12, 2024, it was announced that Davis would undergo knee surgery that would rule him out for roughly half the season. He was placed on injured reserve on August 27. He was activated on October 5. In Week 7, against the Kansas City Chiefs, Davis recorded his first career interception, which he returned for two yards in the 18–28 loss.

=== Cleveland Browns ===
On March 19, 2026, Davis signed with the Cleveland Browns on a one-year, $3 million contract. On September 1, Davis was placed on injured reserve due to a quad injury.

== NFL career statistics ==
Legend
**Bold**	Career high

=== Regular season ===
Year	Team	Games		Tackles					Interceptions						Fumbles			
Year	Team	GP	GS	Cmb	Solo	Ast	Sck	TFL	Int	Yds	Avg	Lng	TD	PD	FF	FR	Yds	TD
2023	SF	3	0	1	1	0	**1.0**	1	0	0	0.0	0	0	0	0	0	0	0
2024	SF	13	0	12	6	6	0.0	0	**1**	**2**	**2.0**	**2**	0	1	0	0	0	0
2025	SF	17	17	**28**	**10**	**18**	0.5	**4**	0	0	0.0	0	0	**3**	0	0	0	0
Career		33	17	41	17	24	1.5	5	1	2	2.0	2	0	4	0	0	0	0

=== Postseason ===
Year	Team	Games		Tackles					Interceptions						Fumbles			
Year	Team	GP	GS	Cmb	Solo	Ast	Sck	TFL	Int	Yds	Avg	Lng	TD	PD	FF	FR	Yds	TD
2025	SF	2	2	0	0	0	0.0	0	0	0	0.0	0	0	0	0	0	0	0
Career		2	2	0	0	0	0.0	0	0	0	0.0	0	0	0	0	0	0	0

== Personal life ==
Davis was born in Pensacola, Florida to parents Kenneth Davis II and Antoinette Rivera. He is the third of six siblings. He attended West Florida Tech High School where, as a senior, he was ranked the 41st ILB in the nation as a senior, and received three stars from ESPN.
