= Ronnie Lott =

American football player (born 1959)

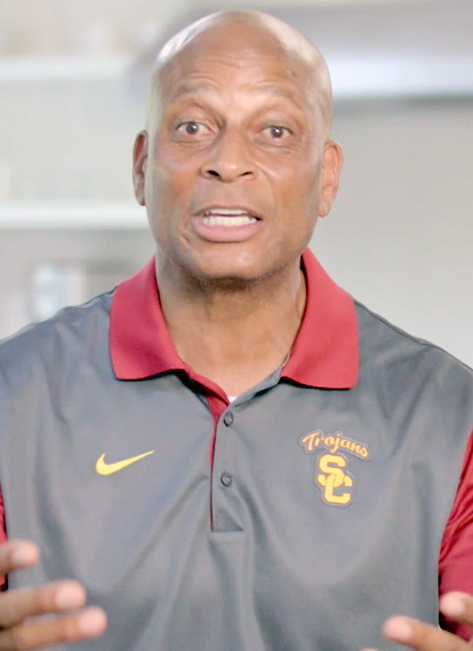
- Lott in 2018

No. 42
- Positions: Cornerback, safety

Personal information
- Born: May 8, 1959 (age 67); Albuquerque, New Mexico, U.S.
- Listed height: 6 ft 0 in (1.83 m)
- Listed weight: 203 lb (92 kg)

Career information
- High school: Eisenhower (Rialto, California)
- College: USC (1977–1980)
- NFL draft: 1981: 1st round, 8th overall pick

Career history
- San Francisco 49ers (1981–1990); Los Angeles Raiders (1991–1992); New York Jets (1993–1994); Kansas City Chiefs (1995)*; San Francisco 49ers (1995)*
- * Offseason or practice squad member only

Awards and highlights
- 4× Super Bowl champion (XVI, XIX, XXIII, XXIV); 8× First-team All-Pro (1981, 1983, 1986–1991); 10× Pro Bowl (1981–1984, 1986–1991); 2× NFL interceptions leader (1986, 1991); NFL combined tackles leader (1982); NFL 1980s All-Decade Team; NFL 1990s All-Decade Team; NFL 75th Anniversary All-Time Team; NFL 100th Anniversary All-Time Team; PFWA All-Rookie Team (1981); San Francisco 49ers Hall of Fame; San Francisco 49ers No. 42 retired; National champion (1978); Unanimous All-American (1980); NCAA interceptions co-leader (1980); 2× First-team All-Pac-10 (1979, 1980); Second-team All-Pac-10 (1978); First-team AP All-Time All-American (2025); NFL record: Most interceptions returned for touchdown in a season by a rookie: 3 (1981; tied) (Note: Tied with Lem Barney and Janoris Jenkins)

Career NFL statistics
- Tackles: 1,146
- Interceptions: 63
- Interception return yards: 730
- Forced fumbles: 16
- Fumble recoveries: 17
- Defensive touchdowns: 5
- Stats at Pro Football Reference
- Pro Football Hall of Fame
- College Football Hall of Fame

Ronald Mandel Lott (born May 8, 1959) is an American former professional football player in the National Football League (NFL) for 14 seasons.

Lott played college football for the USC Trojans, and was honored as a consensus All-American. He was drafted in the first round of the 1981 NFL draft by the San Francisco 49ers. Lott was also a member of the Los Angeles Raiders, New York Jets, and Kansas City Chiefs. He was inducted into the Pro Football Hall of Fame in 2000 and the International Sports Hall of Fame in 2023, and is widely considered to be one of the greatest of all time at the safety position in NFL history.

== Early life ==
Ronald Mandel Lott was born on May 8, 1959, in Albuquerque, New Mexico. He attended Eisenhower High School in Rialto, California, where he played football, baseball, basketball, and wrestled.

== College career ==
Lott played at the University of Southern California from 1977 to 1980.

After lettering in limited time as a freshman in 1977, Lott made the Trojans' starting lineup in 1978 and recorded three interceptions, assisting the team to a 12–1 record and splitting the national championship with Alabama in 1978.

The 1979 season saw more success for USC. Lott recorded three interceptions again as a key member of an elite secondary that included future NFL players Jeff Fisher, Dennis Smith, and Joey Browner. Along with an offense that included all American quarterback Paul McDonald, Heisman winner Charles White, future Heisman winner Marcus Allen, and four future NFL first round picks in the offensive line, he helped USC finish with an 11–0–1 record and a #2 ranking in both polls.

As a senior, Lott led the nation in interceptions (8) and return yards (166), earning himself unanimous All-American honors as the team went 8–2–1 with a final ranking of #11 while the team served a one-year NCAA probation.

Lott played in six games for the 1979–80 USC basketball team under coach Stan Morrison.

In 1999, Sports Illustrated included Lott on its All-Century Team for college football.

== Professional career ==
=== San Francisco 49ers (first stint) ===
Lott was selected in the first round (8th overall) of the 1981 NFL draft by the San Francisco 49ers. Standing at 6 feet (1.8 m) tall and weighing 203 pounds (92 kg), the level of skill demonstrated by Lott was instantly recognized, and from the very beginning of training camp, he had the job as the 49ers' starting left cornerback. As a rookie in 1981, Lott recorded seven interceptions, helped the 49ers win Super Bowl XVI, and also became only the second rookie in NFL history to return three interceptions for touchdowns. His outstanding play resulted in Lott finishing second for rookie of the year honors, behind New York Giants linebacker Lawrence Taylor.

Lott switched to the safety position in 1985. He had the tip of his left pinky finger amputated after the 1985 season when it was crushed while tackling running back Timmy Newsome, and a bone graft surgery would not have allowed Lott to start the 1986 season. While he told doctors to amputate the tip of his pinky, Lott regretted having the procedure done, saying years later that he should have just had an operation to fix his finger. An injury sidelined Lott for the season's last two games in 1986, but he still led the league with a career-best 10 interceptions, while recording 77 tackles, three forced fumbles, and two quarterback sacks. In his 10 seasons with the 49ers, Lott helped them win eight division titles and four Super Bowls: XVI (1981 season), XIX (1984), XXIII (1988), and XXIV (1989). He is one of five players involved in all four 49ers Super Bowl wins in the 1980s. The other four are quarterback Joe Montana, linebacker Keena Turner, cornerback Eric Wright, and wide receiver Mike Wilson.

=== Los Angeles Raiders ===
After his career with San Francisco, Lott signed with the Los Angeles Raiders as a free agent in 1991. That season, he led the league in interceptions (8) for a second time.

=== New York Jets ===
Lott signed with the New York Jets in 1993.

=== San Francisco 49ers (second stint) ===
Lott returned to the 49ers in 1995, but the injuries he had suffered over the previous four seasons continued to plague him, and Lott announced his retirement before the season began.

Lott was elected to the Pro Football Hall of Fame in 2000, his first year of eligibility, and was also named to the NFL's 75th Anniversary Team in 1994 and the 100th Anniversary Team in 2019.

== Player profile ==
During his 14 NFL seasons, Lott recorded 8.5 sacks and 63 interceptions, which he returned for 730 yards and five touchdowns. Lott recovered 17 fumbles, returned them for 43 yards, and gained 113 yards on kickoff returns. Lott also played in 20 postseason games, recording nine interceptions, 89 tackles, a forced fumble, a fumble recovery, and two touchdowns. He was named All-Pro eight times, All-NFC six times, and All-AFC once. Lott had an uncanny awareness of how a play was developing, which allowed him to break up passes and earn a reputation as one of the hardest and most efficient open-field tacklers in the history of the league.

== NFL career statistics ==
Legend
	Won the Super Bowl
	NFL record
	Led the league
**Bold**	Career-high

=== Regular season ===
Year	Team	Games		Tackles				Interceptions						Fumbles			
Year	Team	GP	GS	Cmb	Solo	Ast	Sck	PD	Int	Yds	Avg	Lng	TD	FF	FR	Yds	TD
1981	SF	16	16	89	—	—	0.0	—	7	117	16.7	41T	**3**	0	2	0	0
1982	SF	9	9	68	—	—	0.0	—	2	95	**47.5**	**83T**	1	1	0	0	0
1983	SF	15	14	108	—	—	1.0	—	4	22	5.5	22	0	0	1	0	0
1984	SF	12	11	51	—	—	1.0	—	4	26	6.5	15	0	0	0	0	0
1985	SF	16	16	104	—	—	1.5	—	6	68	11.3	25	0	1	2	0	0
1986	SF	14	14	77	—	—	**2.0**	—	**10**	**134**	13.4	57T	1	3	0	0	0
1987	SF	12	12	55	—	—	0.0	—	5	62	12.4	34	0	0	2	**33**	0
1988	SF	13	12	74	—	—	0.0	—	5	59	11.8	44	0	3	**4**	3	0
1989	SF	11	11	42	—	—	0.0	—	5	34	6.8	28	0	0	0	0	0
1990	SF	11	11	53	—	—	0.0	—	3	26	8.6	15	0	0	1	3	0
1991	LA	16	16	93	—	—	1.0	—	8	52	6.5	27	0	1	1	4	0
1992	LA	16	16	103	—	—	0.0	—	1	0	0.0	0	0	1	1	0	0
1993	NYJ	16	16	**123**	—	—	1.0	—	3	35	11.6	29	0	**4**	2	0	0
1994	NYJ	15	15	106	73	33	1.0	—	—	—	—	—	—	2	1	0	0
Career		192	189	1,146	1,113	33	8.5	—	63	730	11.6	83	5	16	17	43	0

=== Postseason ===
Year	Team	Games		Tackles				Interceptions						Fumbles			
Year	Team	GP	GS	Cmb	Solo	Ast	Sck	PD	Int	Yds	Avg	Lng	TD	FF	FR	Yds	TD
1981	SF	3	3	3	—	—	0.0	—	**2**	32	16.0	20	**1**	0	0	0	0
1983	SF	2	2	0	—	—	0.0	—	1	0	0.0	0	0	0	0	0	0
1984	SF	3	3	1	—	—	0.0	—	1	38	**38.0**	38	0	0	0	0	0
1985	SF	1	1	0	—	—	0.0	—	0	0	0.0	0	0	0	0	0	0
1986	SF	1	1	0	—	—	0.0	—	0	0	0.0	0	0	0	0	0	0
1987	SF	1	1	0	—	—	0.0	—	0	0	0.0	0	0	0	0	0	0
1988	SF	3	3	**4**	—	—	0.0	—	**2**	10	5.0	5	0	**1**	**1**	0	0
1989	SF	3	3	1	—	—	0.0	—	**2**	**72**	36.0	**58**	**1**	0	0	0	0
1990	SF	2	2	0	—	—	0.0	—	0	0	0.0	0	0	0	0	0	0
1991	LA	1	1	0	—	—	0.0	—	1	35	35.0	35	0	0	0	0	0
Career		20	20	9	—	—	0.0	—	9	187	20.8	58	2	1	1	0	0

== Career highlights ==
=== Awards and honors ===
NFL

- 4× Super Bowl champion (XVI, XIX, XXIII, XXIV)
- 8× First-team All-Pro (1981, 1983, 1986–1991)
- 10× Pro Bowl (1981–1984, 1986–1991)
- 2× NFL interceptions leader (1986, 1991)
- NFL combined tackles leader (1982)
- NFL 1980s All-Decade Team
- NFL 1990s All-Decade Team
- NFL 75th Anniversary All-Time Team
- NFL 100th Anniversary All-Time Team
- No. 11 on The Top 100: NFL's Greatest Players
- PFWA All-Rookie Team (1981)
- San Francisco 49ers Hall of Fame
- San Francisco 49ers No. 42 retired

College

- National champion (1978)
- Unanimous All-American (1980)
- NCAA interceptions co-leader (1980)
- 2× First-team All-Pac-10 (1979, 1980)
- Second-team All-Pac-10 (1978)
- First-team AP All-Time All-American (2025)

=== Records ===
==== NFL records ====
- Most interceptions returned for touchdown in a season by a rookie: 3 (1981; tied) (Note: Tied with Lem Barney and Janoris Jenkins)
- Most postseason interceptions: 9

==== 49ers franchise records ====
- Most interceptions in a single season: 10 (tied with Dave Baker)
- Most interception return yards: 643
- Most career interceptions: 51

== Broadcasting career ==
Lott turned to broadcasting following his retirement, serving as an analyst on Fox NFL Sunday in 1996 and 1997, and working on the network's game coverage in 1998. Lott previously appeared on a show called PAC-12 Playbook on the Pac-12 Network, now defunct. He also serves on the Board of Selectors of Jefferson Awards for Public Service.

== Personal life ==
Lott was born in Albuquerque, New Mexico. His father served a career in the United States Air Force, retiring as a Senior master sergeant. Lott now lives in Cupertino, California, with his wife, Karen, and three children: Hailey, Isaiah, and Chloe. Hailey is married to Seattle Seahawks defensive lineman Leonard Williams. USA Today praised Lott as "one of the most successful athletes at making the transition to business." Along with former teammates Harris Barton and Joe Montana, Lott was a managing partner and a founder of HRJ Capital. Lott owns Toyota and Hyundai car dealerships. He advises professional athletes who are making a transition to the business world. Lott is also the father of former Tampa Bay Buccaneers linebacker Ryan Nece.

In 1991, Lott, along with Jill Lieber Steeg, wrote an autobiography, Total Impact. Lott inspired the Lott IMPACT Trophy, which is given annually by the Pacific Club IMPACT Foundation to college football's Defensive IMPACT Player of the Year. The trophy was first awarded in 2004. Lott was the guest of honor at a CYO fundraiser at Sharon Heights Country Club in Menlo Park, California in May 2012, where he discussed the importance of helping the community. Lott credits the late Coach Ben Parks as a central figure in the development of his vigorous philanthropic work. On February 17, 2015, Lott was appointed to the Board of Directors of GSV Capital Corporation, now known as SuRo Capital Corp., a publicly traded investment fund.

== See also ==
- Bay Area Sports Hall of Fame
- The Lott Trophy
