= BravoCon =

Reality television convention

- Status: Active
- Genre: Reality television
- Locations: New York City, New York; Las Vegas, Nevada
- Country: United States
- Inaugurated: November 15, 2019; 6 years ago
- Most recent: November 16, 2025; 11 months ago
- Next event: 2027
- Attendance: approx. 30,000 (2025)
- Organizer: Bravo

BravoCon is a semi-annual three-day reality television fan convention dedicated to the Bravo network. The convention, hosted by executive producer Andy Cohen, features live panels and meet-and-greets from the current and past cast members of Bravo shows including The Real Housewives, Below Deck, and Million Dollar Listing franchises, Married to Medicine, Top Chef, Vanderpump Rules, Shahs of Sunset, Project Runway, and Southern Charm, who are often referred to as "Bravolebrities" or "Bravolebs". The event also contains casting and series announcements, The Real Housewives museum, which showcases memorabilia, and the Bravo Bazaar shopping experience.

The Bravos (also referred to as the Bravo Awards), were introduced at BravoCon 2023 as an award ceremony honoring the personalities and memorable moments of Bravo. The statue given to winners is of the Watch What Happens Live mascot, Gay Shark.

In May 2026, Andy Cohen announced the upcoming BravoCon will be in 2027.

== History ==
After Andy Cohen's late night talk show, Watch What Happens Live, received positive feedback after being taped in Los Angeles rather than its Embassy Row studio in New York City, Bravo senior vice president of consumer and social marketing Maria Laino DeLuca, executive producer Deirdre Connolly, and Cohen came up with the idea for BravoCon, with Cohen describing it as "one big destination wedding."

On May 22, 2019, Bravo announced that the first-ever BravoCon would take place from November 15–17 of that year in New York City. Following the announcement of BravoCon, tickets were made available for purchase in August, with costs ranging from $125 to $1,500.

== Events ==
The inaugural BravoCon was held at three locations: Hammerstein Ballroom at the Manhattan Center, Skylight Modern, and Union West. The event was sold out with approximately 10,000 fans attending, along with 88 Bravolebrities. The event, which included performances by both Kim Zolciak-Biermann and Luann de Lesseps, marked the most-attended Watch What Happens Live taping, as well as the announcement of Leah McSweeney's joining of The Real Housewives of New York City.

In May 2021, BravoCon was announced to return after a one-year-hiatus due to the coronavirus pandemic, with the dates set for October 15–17. However, on August 9, Bravo announced per their social media that BravoCon 2021 had been canceled, writing "We are just as disappointed as our loyal fans to have to cancel this year's event, but health and safety are our top priorities. We look forward to celebrating BravoCon 2022 together," subsequently announcing BravoCon 2022.

BravoCon 2022 took place from October 14–16, at the Javits Center, and was attended by more than 30,000 fans, and 100 Bravolebrities, along with special guests Savannah Guthrie and Hoda Kotb. Panel segments contained "Atlanta Peaches in the Big Apple," "Jersey Ladies & Their Men," "SLC in the NYC," "Potomac Takes Manhattan," and "We're Going (Back) to Miami," for The Real Housewives franchises, "The Reunion Real Tea With Bravo Producers," a producer 'tell-all' panel; "Below Deck Crew Oughta Know" and "Oh Captain, Our Captains," for the Below Deck franchise; "Summer House in Autumn" and "SUR'ving Up the Latest Vanderpump Rules." During the "Project Runway of Their World" panel, Christian Siriano and Elaine Welteroth announced the upcoming twentieth season of Project Runway would be all All-stars season; Andy Cohen unveiled the reboot cast of The Real Housewives of New York City would include Sai De Silva, Ubah Hassan, Erin Dana Lichy, Jenna Lyons, Lizzy Savetsky, Jessel Taank, and Brynn Whitfield; Luann & Sonja: Welcome to Crappie Lake was also announced.

In April 2023, Bravo announced that their third convention would relocate to Las Vegas, Nevada, at the Caesars Forum convention center and would take place from November 3–5, 2023. BravoCon 2023 was attended by 160 Bravolebrities, the most appearances since the conventions launch. Some panels included: "Ask Andy" (accompanied by Jeff Lewis), "Bravo2Bravo: Bosom Buddies," "Magic Men of Jersey," "Housewife2Housewife: Comeback Queens," "SUR'ving Up the Latest With Vanderpump Rules," "The Way We OC It," "The Summer House Always Wins," "Oh Captain, Our Captains," and "Viva Las Atlanta Peaches." The event also saw the introduction of The Bravos, an award ceremony honoring the personalities and alumni of Bravo.

In April 2024, Bravo announced there would not be a 2024 convention, but would return to Las Vegas in 2025; confirming the conventions dates for November 14–16, 2025.

As promised, BravoCon returned in 2025, once again at Caesars Forum; with The Bravo awards and Watch What Happens Live tappings taking place at the Planet Hollywood Resort & Casino. The convention, attended by 150 Bravolebrities, featured a DJ set by Meredith Marks and Dorinda Medley. Notable panels included: "Gold Stage," "Bravowood Squares Live," "Bravo Bravo F'ing Bravo," "Bravoverse Live Stage," "Bravo Bachelorette Party," "Passing the Bravo Torch," "Housewife2Housewife: A New Lease on Wife," "Battle of the Sexes," "Traitor De Force," "House(wives) Party," and "Ask Andy." BravoCon 2025 saw the announcements of The Real Housewives: Ultimate Road Trip, celebrating 20 years of The Real Housewives; The Real Housewives of Rhode Island, along with its inaugural cast of Alicia Carmody, Rosie DiMare, Ashley Iaconetti, Liz McGraw, Rulla Nehme Pontarelli, Kelsey Swanson, and Jo-Ellen Tiberi; Lisa Vanderpump's production of a new reality show surrounding her Las Vegas hotel; and Vicki Gunvalson's full-time return to The Real Housewives of Orange County.

On May 11, 2026, Andy Cohen announced BravoCon would return in the fall of 2027; he subsequently announced the Bravo Fan Fest would return this year in Charleston, South Carolina.

== The Bravos ==
=== BravoCon 2023 ===
The 2023 Bravos were held at The Paris Theater; the winners (listed in bold) and nominees of the first Bravo awards were as follows:

| Who Said That? Award for Colloquial Excellence: | Vicki Gunvalson GAG Award: |
|---|---|
| **"You're a worm with a mustache," – James Kennedy, Vanderpump Rules**; "This neighborhood is like really up and coming," – Jessel Taank, The Real Housewives of New York City; "The rumors, the nastiness about her… oh, I can do that… You! Can! Leave!" – Meredith Marks, The Real Housewives of Salt Lake City; "I do not acknowledge Sesame Street characters, they are make-believe, they belong at Sesame Street. Next," – Candiace Dillard Bassett, The Real Housewives of Potomac; "I'm on play all the time," – Lisa Barlow, The Real Housewives of Salt Lake City | John Fuda getting his chest waxed – The Real Housewives of New Jersey; **Emily Simpson drinking water out of a dog bowl – The Real Housewives of Orange County**; Luann de Lesseps eating testicles – Luann & Sonja: Welcome to Crappie Lake; Phil purposefully not flushing Nicholas Arrington's toilet – Summer House: Martha's Vineyard; Aesha Scott putting Captain Jason Chambers' contacts in for him – Below Deck Down Under |
| Award for Greatest Shade Thrower | The Bunny Honoree for Most Iconic Item of the Year |
| Karen Huger – The Real Housewives of Potomac; Dr. Heavenly Kimes – Married to Medicine; **Lala Kent – Vanderpump Rules**; Kenya Moore – The Real Housewives of Atlanta; Kate Chastain – Below Deck & The Traitors | Gizelle Bryant's missing tequila bottle – The Real Housewives Ultimate Girls Trip; **Captain Jason Chambers' disco helmet – Below Deck Down Under**; Kyle Cooke's tiny cowboy hat – Summer House; Robyn Dixon's BlueTooth speaker – The Real Housewives of Potomac; Shereé Whitfield's She News newspaper, The Real Housewives of Atlanta |
| The Dorit Kemsley Award for Chicest Bravolebrity | BravoCon Follies: Song of the Year |
| **Chanel Ayan – The Real Housewives of Dubai**; Sai De Silva – The Real Housewives of New York City; Ariana Madix – Vanderpump Rules; Marlo Hampton – The Real Housewives of Atlanta; Sutton Stracke – The Real Housewives of Beverly Hills | **"Drive Back" – Candiace Dillard Bassett – The Real Housewives Ultimate Girls Trip**; "Away in a Manger" – Lisa Barlow – The Real Housewives of Salt Lake City; "Good As Gold" – Scheana Shay – BravoCon 2022; "Throw Us Away" – Drew Sidora – The Real Housewives of Atlanta; "O Holy Night" – Erika Jayne – The Real Housewives of Beverly Hills |
| Rookie of the Year Award | Best Dressed… In a Costume |
| Danielle Cabral and Rachel Fuda – The Real Housewives of New Jersey season 13; Inaugural cast of Summer House: Martha's Vineyard; Inaugural cast of Southern Hospitality; **Reboot cast of The Real Housewives of New York City season 14**; Tamra Judge and Jennifer Pedranti – The Real Housewives of Orange County season 17 | **Ciara Miller as Karma Brown – Summer House**; Tamra Judge as Heather Dubrow – The Real Housewives of Orange County; Whitney Rose as "Little Girl" – The Real Housewives of Salt Lake City; Garcelle Beauvais as a disco diva – The Real Housewives of Beverly Hills; Luann de Lesseps and Sonja Morgan's Christmas In July looks – Welcome to Crappie Lake |

=== BravoCon 2025 ===
The categories for the 2025 Bravos were available for fan-voting on Bravotv.com from October 30 to November 6, 2025. The 2025 Bravos were held at Planet Hollywood. The winners (listed in bold) and nominees of the second Bravo awards were as follows:

| The T'Challa Award for Best Appearance of an Animal | Best Dressed… In a Costume |
|---|---|
| **Shannon Beador's dog, Archie – The Real Housewives of Orange County**; Adriana DeMoura's dog, Basquiat – The Real Housewives of Miami; Kelli Ferrell's dog, ChaCha – The Real Housewives of Atlanta | Toya Bush-Harris' Bridgerton Party – Married to Medicine; Meredith Marks as Audrey Hepburn – The Real Housewives of Salt Lake City; **Ciara Miller as Brantley – Summer House**; Jessel Taank's Clueless Birthday Party – The Real Housewives of New York City; West Wilson at The Snoozefest Party – Summer House |
| Fashion Forward Award | Best Fight Over Nothing |
| Jenna Lyons' reunion bathrobe – The Real Housewives of New York City; **Bronwyn Newport's heart-shaped cape – The Real Housewives of Salt Lake City**; Marysol Patton's eye patch – The Real Housewives of Miami; Dr. Jackie Walters' "Wicked" glasses – Married to Medicine; West Wilson's scarf and trucker hat combo – Summer House | Lisa Barlow and Bronwyn Newport – The Real Housewives of Salt Lake City; Craig Conover and Kyle Cooke – Summer House; Ubah Hassan and Erin Lichy – The Real Housewives of New York City; **Mary Cosby & Angie Katsanevas – The Real Housewives of Salt Lake City**; Gizelle Bryant & Stacey Rusch – The Real Housewives of Potomac |
| Dynamic Duos | Greatest Shade Thrower |
| Ariana Biermann and Riley Burruss – Next Gen NYC; **Mary Cosby and Angie Katsanevas – The Real Housewives of Salt Lake City**; Dorit Kemsley and Bozoma Saint John – The Real Housewives of Beverly Hills; Austen Kroll and Madison LeCroy – Southern Charm; Marysol Patton and Alexia Nepola on The Real Housewives of Miami | Jasmine Goode – The Valley; Kathy Hilton – The Real Housewives of Beverly Hills; Dorit Kemsley – The Real Housewives of Beverly Hills; Shamea Morton and Angela Oakley – The Real Housewives of Atlanta; **Phaedra Parks – The Real Housewives of Atlanta** |
| The Bunny Honoree for Most Iconic Bravo Item of the Year | Who Said That? Award for Colloquial Excellence |
| Lindsay Hubbard's Sonogram – Summer House; Tamra Judge and Jennifer Pedranti's Hair Extensions – The Real Housewives of Orange County; Angie Katsanevas' Scroll – The Real Housewives of Salt Lake City; **Dorit Kemsley's Revenge Cigarette – The Real Housewives of Beverly Hills**; Angela Oakley's Fan – The Real Housewives of Atlanta | "Gout dick sucker!" – Lisa Barlow, The Real Housewives of Salt Lake City; "I am a lawyer and a storyteller!" – Craig Conover, Southern Charm; "High body count hair" – Angie Katsanevas, The Real Housewives of Salt Lake City; **"She was cheating on Martina with a Haitian mortician!" – Adriana de Moura, The Real Housewives of Miami**; "But still I rise." – Stacey Rusch, The Real Housewives of Potomac |
| Rookie of the Year | The Wifetime Achievement Award |
| **Inaugural cast of Next Gen NYC**; Kelli Ferrell, Shamea Morton Mwangi, and Angela Oakley – The Real Housewives of Atlanta season 16; Tia Glover and Angel Massie – The Real Housewives of Potomac season 10; Stephanie Shojaee – The Real Housewives of Miami season 7; Molly Moore, Michols Pena, and Lake Rucker – Southern Hospitality season 3 | Kandi Burruss – The Real Housewives of Atlanta |

== Locations and dates ==
| No. | Dates | Primary location | Attendance | Announcements |
|---|---|---|---|---|
| 1 | Nov 15–17, 2019 | Hammerstein Ballroom (Manhattan) | 10,000+ | – Leah McSweeney joining The Real Housewives of New York City |
| 2 | Oct 14–16, 2022 | Javits Center (Manhattan) | 30,000+ | – All-Stars format for the twentieth season of Project Runway – Reboot cast of The Real Housewives of New York City – Luann de Lesseps and Sonja Morgan's spin-off, Luann & Sonja: Welcome to Crappie Lake |
| 3 | Nov 3–5, 2023 | Caesars Forum (Las Vegas) | 27,000+ | —N/a |
| 4 | Nov 14–16, 2025 | Caesars Forum (Las Vegas) | 30,000+ | – The Real Housewives of Rhode Island and cast – Shahs of Sunset spin-off The Valley: Persian Style – The Real Housewives: Ultimate Road Trip – Vicki Gunvalson's return to The Real Housewives of Orange County |
