= 2022 NFL draft =

87th annual meeting of NFL franchises to select newly eligible players

General information
- Date: April 28–30, 2022
- Location: Caesars Forum; Paradise, Nevada
- Networks: ESPN, ESPN2, ABC, NFL Network, ESPN Deportes, ESPN Radio

Overview
- 262 total selections in 7 rounds
- League: National Football League
- First selection: Travon Walker, DE, Jacksonville Jaguars
- Mr. Irrelevant: Brock Purdy, QB, San Francisco 49ers
- Most selections (11): Baltimore Ravens; Chicago Bears; Green Bay Packers; New York Giants
- Fewest selections (4): Miami Dolphins

The 2022 NFL draft was the National Football League's 87th annual draft and was held from April 28–30, 2022, at the Caesars Forum on the Las Vegas Strip in Paradise next to Las Vegas. The first round was held on Thursday, April 28, and was followed by the second and third rounds on Friday, April 29. The draft concluded with rounds 4–7 on Saturday, April 30. It was the first draft to be held in the Las Vegas metropolitan area and the state of Nevada.

The first five selections were defensive players, the second-most taken at the start of a draft after the six in 1991. Along with the 1972 and 2000 drafts, it marked the third time defensive players were the first two picks after the first three picks in the previous year's draft were quarterbacks. Five Georgia defensive players were taken during the first round, the most from an individual school in a draft. In addition to the high number of defensive selections, nine offensive linemen were taken in the first round, the most since 2013. Conversely, only one quarterback was selected in the first round at 20th overall, the lowest for a draft's first quarterback since 1997, and no running backs were taken in the first round for the first time since 2014.

A record nine draft-day trades with first-round picks were made, which resulted in less than half of the first-round selections being made by the teams that initially owned them. Analysts attributed the high number of trades to eight teams entering the draft without a first-round selection and a general absence of highly touted prospects.

== Host city ==
Las Vegas was originally scheduled to host the 2020 NFL draft, coinciding with the Oakland Raiders' relocation to the city. Due to the COVID-19 pandemic the draft was held as a virtual event. Las Vegas was given the 2022 Draft as a result.

Draft activities were held around two main locations on the Las Vegas Strip; invited players walked a floating red carpet on the man-made lake in front of the Bellagio and its fountains. The plans were similar to those originally intended for the 2020 draft, although a plan for players to be transported onto the stage by boat was scrapped in favor of using walkways.

Caesars Forum housed infrastructure for the event. The Linq Promenade hosted the NFL Draft Experience, which featured fan activities. Parts of Flamingo Road and Las Vegas Boulevard were closed to vehicle traffic to allow spectators to travel between the two sites.

== Player selections ==
The following is the breakdown of the 262 players selected by position:

- 37 cornerbacks
- 33 linebackers
- 28 wide receivers
- 24 offensive tackles
- 22 running backs
- 21 defensive ends
- 19 safeties
- 19 guards
- 19 tight ends
- 19 defensive tackles
- 9 quarterbacks
- 6 centers
- 4 punters
- 1 kicker
- 1 fullback

*	compensatory selection
×	Resolution JC-2A selection
†	Pro Bowler (Note: Players are identified as Pro Bowlers if they were selected for the Pro Bowl at any time in their career.)

Positions key
Offense	Defense	Special teams
QB — Quarterback; RB — Running back; FB — Fullback; WR — Wide receiver; TE — Tight end; OL — Offensive lineman; T — Tackle; G — Guard; C — Center	DL — Defensive lineman; DT — Defensive tackle (Note: Includes nose tackle (NT)); DE — Defensive end; EDGE — Edge rusher; LB — Linebacker (Note: Includes middle linebacker (MLB/MIKE), weakside linebacker (WILL), strongside linebacker (SAM), off-ball linebacker, and outside linebacker (OLB)); DB — Defensive back; CB — Cornerback; S — Safety (Note: Includes free safety (FS) and strong safety (SS))	K — Kicker (Note: Also known as a placekicker (PK)); P — Punter; LS — Long snapper; RS — Return specialist (Note: Includes kickoff and punt returners)

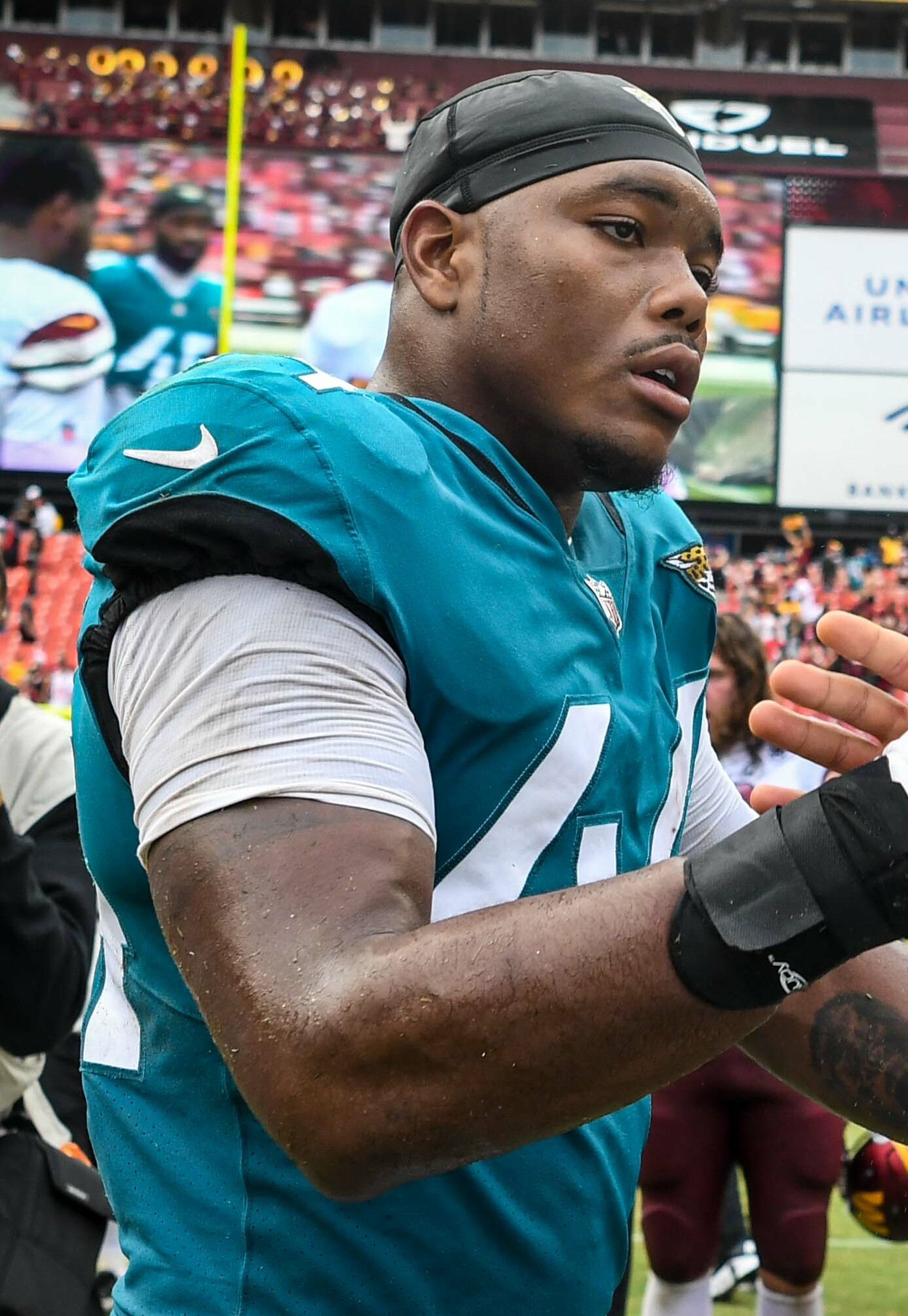
Outside linebacker Travon Walker was drafted first overall by the Jacksonville Jaguars.

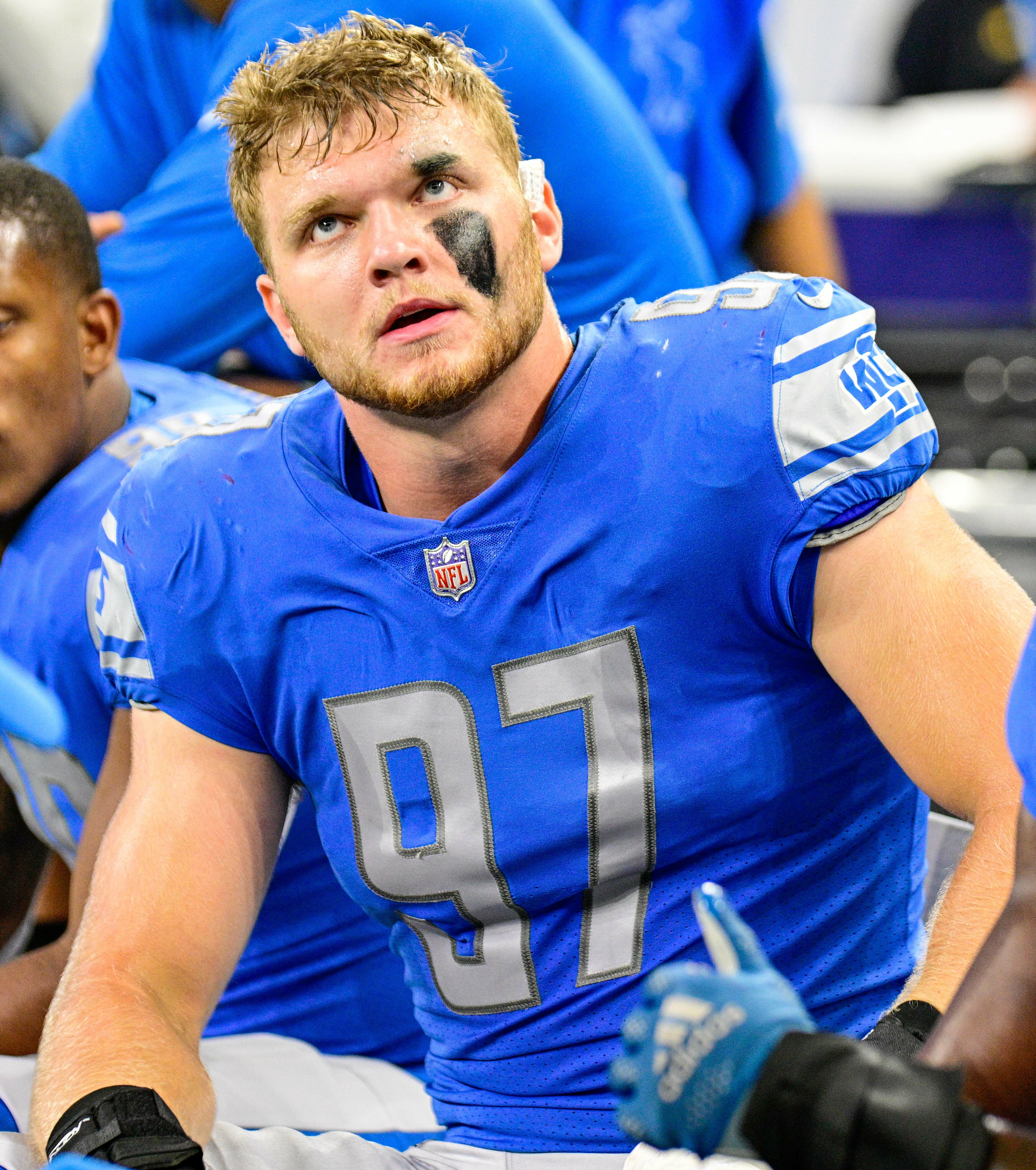
Defensive end Aidan Hutchinson was drafted second overall by the Detroit Lions.

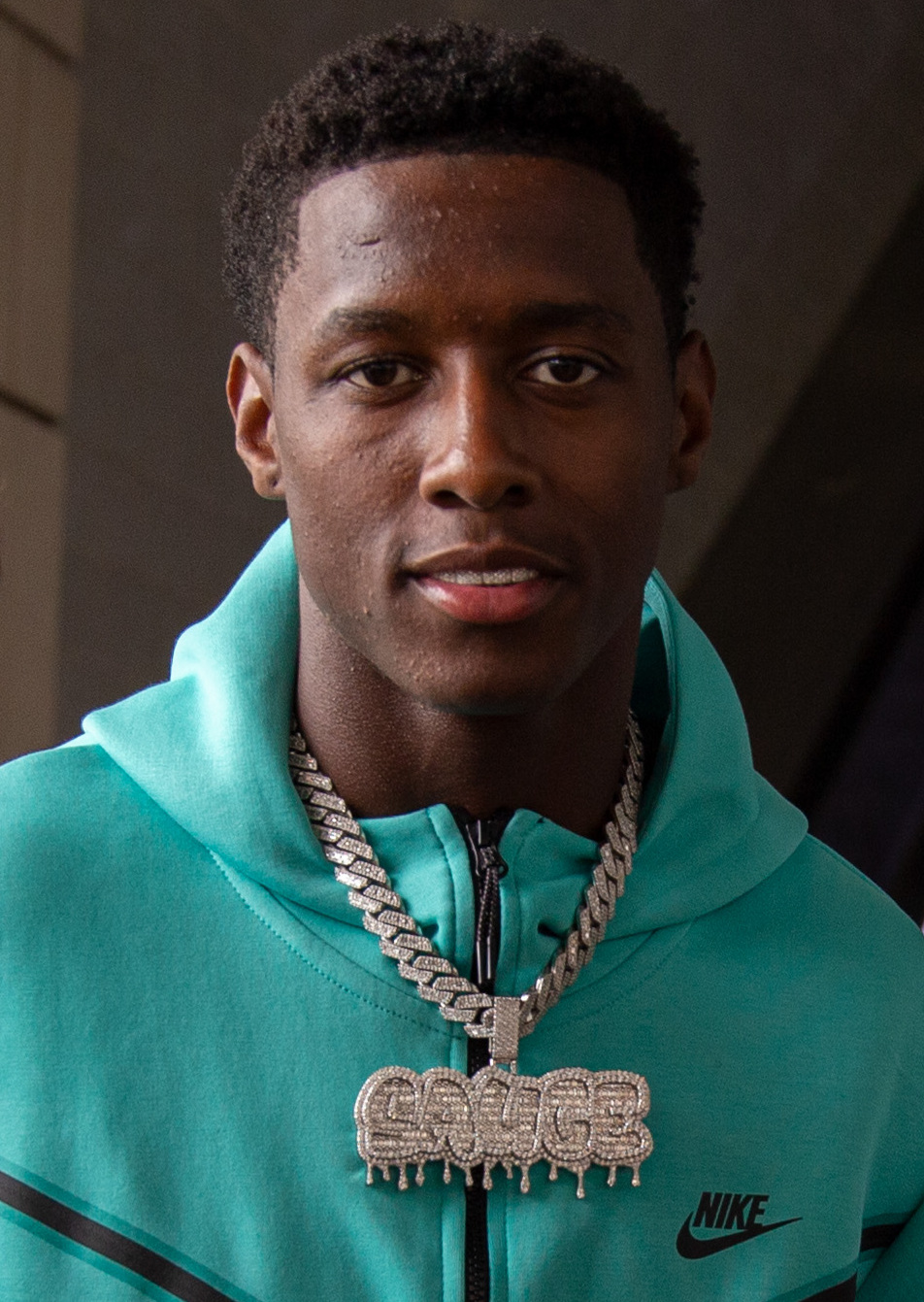
Cornerback Sauce Gardner, drafted fourth overall by the New York Jets, was named Defensive Rookie of the Year.

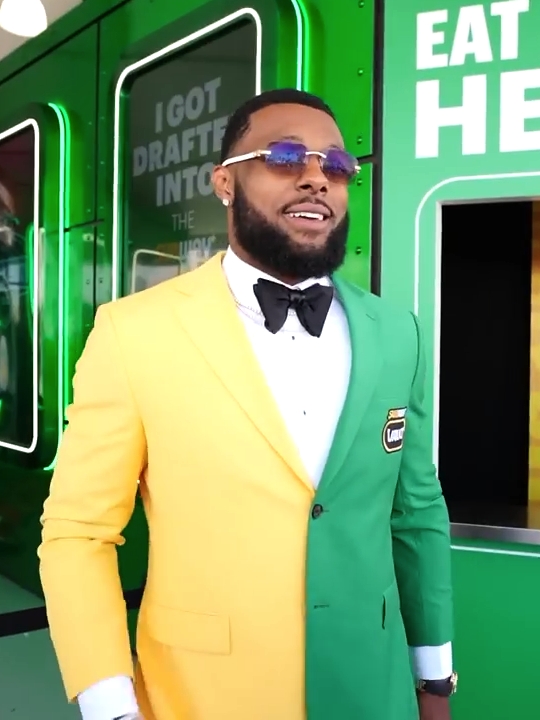
Outside linebacker Kayvon Thibodeaux was drafted fifth by the New York Giants.

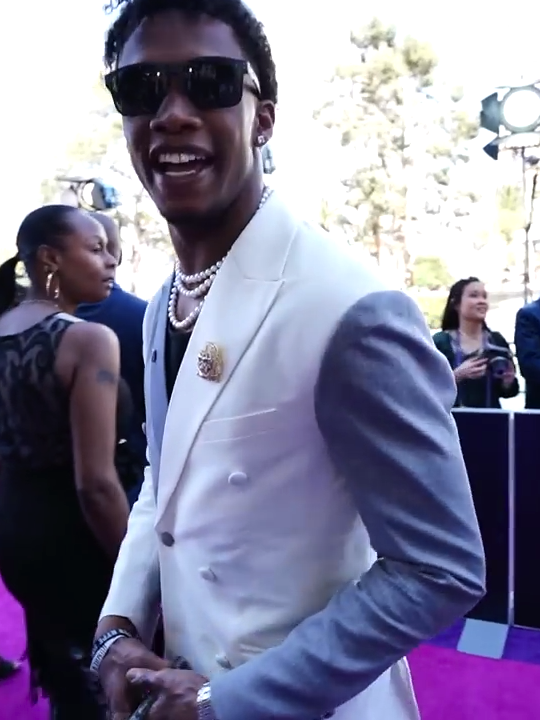
Wide receiver Garrett Wilson, taken 10th overall by the New York Jets, was named Offensive Rookie of the Year.

Rnd.	Pick	Team	Player	Pos.	College	Notes
1	1	Jacksonville Jaguars	Travon Walker	DE	Georgia	
1	2	Detroit Lions	Aidan Hutchinson ^{†}	DE	Michigan	2021 Lombardi Award, Lott Trophy and Ted Hendricks Award winner
1	3	Houston Texans	Derek Stingley Jr. ^{†}	CB	LSU	
1	4	New York Jets	Sauce Gardner ^{†}	CB	Cincinnati	
1	5	New York Giants	Kayvon Thibodeaux	DE	Oregon	
1	6	Carolina Panthers	Ikem Ekwonu	T	NC State	
1	7	New York Giants	Evan Neal	T	Alabama	from Chicago (Note: No. 7: Chicago → NY Giants (PD). Chicago traded first- and fourth-round selections (7th and 112th overall), and 2021 first- and fourth-round selections to the NY Giants in exchange for a 2021 first-round selection.)
1	8	Atlanta Falcons	Drake London	WR	USC	
1	9	Seattle Seahawks	Charles Cross	T	Mississippi State	from Denver (Note: No. 9: Denver → Seattle (PD). Denver traded first-, second- and fifth-round selections (9th, 40th and 145th overall), 2023 first- and second-round selections, QB Drew Lock, TE Noah Fant and DT Shelby Harris to the Seattle Seahawks in exchange for a fourth-round selection (116th overall) and QB Russell Wilson.)
1	10	New York Jets	Garrett Wilson	WR	Ohio State	from Seattle (Note: No. 10: Seattle → NY Jets (PD). Seattle traded a first-round selection (10th overall), 2021 first- and third-round selections, and S Bradley McDougald to the NY Jets in exchange for a fourth-round selection (109th overall) and S Jamal Adams.)
1	11	New Orleans Saints	Chris Olave	WR	Ohio State	from Washington (Note: No. 11: Washington → New Orleans (D). Washington traded a first-round selection (11th overall) to New Orleans in exchange for first-, third- and fourth-round selections (16th, 98th and 120th overall).)
1	12	Detroit Lions	Jameson Williams	WR	Alabama	from Minnesota (Note: No. 12: Minnesota → Detroit (D). Minnesota traded first- and second-round selections (12th and 46th overall) to the Detroit Lions in exchange for first-, second- and third-round selections (32nd, 34th and 66th overall).)
1	13	Philadelphia Eagles	Jordan Davis	DT	Georgia	from Cleveland via Houston (Note: No. 13: Cleveland → Houston → Philadelphia. Multiple trades: Cleveland → Houston (PD). Cleveland traded first- and fourth-round selections (13th and 107th overall), 2023 first- and third-round selections, and 2024 first- and fourth-round selections to Houston in exchange for a 2024 sixth-round selection and QB Deshaun Watson. Houston → Philadelphia (D). Houston traded a first-round selection (13th overall) to Philadelphia in exchange for a first-, a fourth- and two fifth-round selections (15th, 124th, 162nd and 166th overall).); 2021 Chuck Bednarik Award and Outland Trophy winner
1	14	Baltimore Ravens	Kyle Hamilton ^{†}	S	Notre Dame	
1	15	Houston Texans	Kenyon Green	G	Texas A&M	from Miami via Philadelphia (Note: No. 15: Miami → Philadelphia → Houston. Multiple trades: Miami → Philadelphia (PD). Miami traded a first-round selection (15th overall), and 2021 first- and fourth-round selections to Philadelphia in exchange for 2021 first- and fifth-round selections. Philadelphia → Houston (D). See Round 1: Houston → Philadelphia.)
1	16	Washington Commanders	Jahan Dotson	WR	Penn State	from Indianapolis via Philadelphia and New Orleans (Note: No. 16: Indianapolis → Philadelphia → New Orleans → Washington. Multiple trades: Indianapolis → Philadelphia (PD). Indianapolis traded a conditional first-round selection (16th overall) and a 2021 third-round selection to Philadelphia in exchange for QB Carson Wentz. The conditional selection was upgraded from the second round because Wentz played 75% of Indianapolis' offensive snaps. Philadelphia → New Orleans (PD). Philadelphia traded two first-round selections and a sixth-round selection (16th, 19th and 194th overall) to New Orleans in exchange for first-, third- and seventh-round selections (18th, 101st and 237th overall), a 2023 first-round selection and a 2024 second-round selection. New Orleans → Washington (D). See Round 1: Washington → New Orleans.)
1	17	Los Angeles Chargers	Zion Johnson	G	Boston College	
1	18	Tennessee Titans	Treylon Burks	WR	Arkansas	from New Orleans via Philadelphia (Note: No. 18: New Orleans → Philadelphia → Tennessee. Multiple trades: New Orleans → Philadelphia (PD). See Round 1: Philadelphia → New Orleans. Philadelphia → Tennessee (D). Philadelphia traded first- and third-round selections (18th and 101st overall) to Tennessee in exchange for WR A. J. Brown.)
1	19	New Orleans Saints	Trevor Penning	T	Northern Iowa	from Philadelphia (Note: No. 19: Philadelphia → New Orleans (PD). See Round 1: Philadelphia → New Orleans.)
1	20	Pittsburgh Steelers	Kenny Pickett	QB	Pittsburgh	2021 Johnny Unitas Award and Senior CLASS Award winner
1	21	Kansas City Chiefs	Trent McDuffie	CB	Washington	from New England (Note: No. 21: New England → Kansas City (D). New England traded a first-round selection (21st overall) to Kansas City in exchange for first-, third- and fourth-round selections (29th, 94th and 121st overall).)
1	22	Green Bay Packers	Quay Walker	LB	Georgia	from Las Vegas (Note: No. 22: Las Vegas → Green Bay (PD). Las Vegas traded first- and second-round selections (22nd and 53rd overall) to Green Bay in exchange for WR Davante Adams.)
1	23	Buffalo Bills	Kaiir Elam	CB	Florida	from Arizona via Baltimore (Note: No. 23: Arizona → Baltimore → Buffalo. Multiple trades: Arizona → Baltimore (D). Arizona traded a first-round selection (23rd overall) to Baltimore in exchange for a third-round selection (100th overall) and WR Marquise Brown. Baltimore → Buffalo (D). Baltimore traded a first-round selection (23rd overall) to Buffalo in exchange for first- and fourth-round selections (25th and 130th overall).)
1	24	Dallas Cowboys	Tyler Smith ^{†}	T	Tulsa	
1	25	Baltimore Ravens	Tyler Linderbaum ^{†}	C	Iowa	from Buffalo (Note: No. 25: Buffalo → Baltimore (D). See Round 1: Baltimore → Buffalo.); 2021 Rimington Trophy winner
1	26	New York Jets	Jermaine Johnson II ^{†}	DE	Florida State	from Tennessee (Note: No. 26: Tennessee → NY Jets (D). Tennessee traded first- and third-round selections (26th and 101st overall) to the NY Jets in exchange for second-, third- and fifth-round selections (35th, 69th and 163rd overall).)
1	27	Jacksonville Jaguars	Devin Lloyd ^{†}	LB	Utah	from Tampa Bay (Note: No. 27: Tampa Bay → Jacksonville (D). Tampa Bay traded a first-round selection (27th overall) to Jacksonville in exchange for second-, fourth- and sixth-round selections (33rd, 106th and 180th overall).)
1	28	Green Bay Packers	Devonte Wyatt	DT	Georgia	
1	29	New England Patriots	Cole Strange	G	Chattanooga	from San Francisco via Miami and Kansas City (Note: No. 29: San Francisco → Miami → Kansas City → New England. Multiple trades: San Francisco → Miami (PD). San Francisco traded first- and third-round selections (29th and 102nd overall), a 2021 first-round selection and a 2023 first-round selection to Miami in exchange for a 2021 first-round selection. Miami → Kansas City (PD). Miami traded first-, second- and fourth-round selections (29th, 50th and 121st overall), and 2023 fourth- and sixth-round selections to Kansas City in exchange for WR Tyreek Hill. Kansas City → New England (D). See Round 1: New England → Kansas City.)
1	30	Kansas City Chiefs	George Karlaftis	DE	Purdue	
1	31	Cincinnati Bengals	Daxton Hill	S	Michigan	
1	32	Minnesota Vikings	Lewis Cine	S	Georgia	from LA Rams via Detroit (Note: No. 32: LA Rams → Detroit → Minnesota. Multiple trades: LA Rams → Detroit (PD). The LA Rams traded a first-round selection (32nd overall), a 2021 third-round selection, a 2023 first-round selection and QB Jared Goff to Detroit in exchange for QB Matthew Stafford. Detroit → Minnesota (D). See Round 1: Minnesota → Detroit.)
2	33	Tampa Bay Buccaneers	Logan Hall	DE	Houston	from Jacksonville (Note: No. 33: Jacksonville → Tampa Bay (D). See Round 1: Tampa Bay → Jacksonville.)
2	34	Green Bay Packers	Christian Watson	WR	North Dakota State	from Detroit via Minnesota (Note: No. 34: Detroit → Minnesota → Green Bay. Multiple trades: Detroit → Minnesota (D). See Round 1: Minnesota → Detroit. Minnesota → Green Bay (D). Minnesota traded a second-round selection (34th overall) to Green Bay in exchange for two second-round selections (53rd and 59th overall).)
2	35	Tennessee Titans	Roger McCreary	CB	Auburn	from NY Jets (Note: No. 35: NY Jets → Tennessee (D). See Round 1: Tennessee → NY Jets.)
2	36	New York Jets	Breece Hall	RB	Iowa State	from NY Giants (Note: No. 36: NY Giants → NY Jets (D). The NY Giants traded a second-round selection (36th overall) to the NY Jets in exchange for second- and fifth-round selections (38th and 146th overall).)
2	37	Houston Texans	Jalen Pitre	S	Baylor	
2	38	Atlanta Falcons	Arnold Ebiketie	DE	Penn State	from Carolina via NY Jets and NY Giants (Note: No. 38: Carolina → NY Jets → NY Giants → Atlanta. Multiple trades: Carolina → NY Jets (PD). Carolina traded second- and fourth-round selections (38th and 111th overall), and a 2021 sixth-round selection to the NY Jets in exchange for QB Sam Darnold. NY Jets → NY Giants (D). See Round 2: NY Giants → NY Jets. NY Giants → Atlanta (D). The NY Giants traded a second-round selection (38th overall) to Atlanta in exchange for second- and fourth-round selections (43rd and 114th overall).)
2	39	Chicago Bears	Kyler Gordon	CB	Washington	
2	40	Seattle Seahawks	Boye Mafe	DE	Minnesota	from Denver (Note: No. 40: Denver → Seattle (PD). See Round 1: Denver → Seattle.)
2	41	Seattle Seahawks	Kenneth Walker III	RB	Michigan State	2021 Walter Camp Award, Doak Walker Award winner
2	42	Minnesota Vikings	Andrew Booth Jr.	CB	Clemson	from Washington via Indianapolis (Note: No. 42: Washington → Indianapolis → Minnesota. Multiple trades: Washington → Indianapolis (PD). Washington traded second- and third-round selections (42nd and XXth overall) to Indianapolis in exchange for second- and seventh-round selections, and QB Carson Wentz. Indianapolis → Minnesota (D). Indianapolis traded second- and fourth-round selections (42nd and 122nd overall) to Minnesota in exchange for second-, third- and sixth-round selections (53rd, 77th and 192nd overall).)
2	43	New York Giants	Wan'Dale Robinson	WR	Kentucky	from Atlanta (Note: No. 43: Atlanta → NY Giants (D). See Round 2: NY Giants → Atlanta.)
2	44	Houston Texans	John Metchie III	WR	Alabama	from Cleveland (Note: No. 44: Cleveland → Houston (D). Cleveland traded a second-round selection (44th overall) to Houston in exchange for a third-round selection and two fourth-round selections (68th, 108th and 124th overall).); 2020 and 2021 Jon Cornish Trophy winner
2	45	Baltimore Ravens	David Ojabo	LB	Michigan	
2	46	Detroit Lions	Josh Paschal	DE	Kentucky	from Minnesota (Note: No. 46: Minnesota → Detroit (D). See Round 1: Minnesota → Detroit.)
2	47	Washington Commanders	Phidarian Mathis	DT	Alabama	from Indianapolis (Note: No. 47: Indianapolis → Washington (PD). See Round 2: Washington → Indianapolis.)
2	48	Chicago Bears	Jaquan Brisker	S	Penn State	from LA Chargers (Note: No. 48: LA Chargers → Chicago (PD). The LA Chargers traded a second-round selection (48th overall) and a 2023 sixth-round selection to Chicago in exchange for LB Khalil Mack.)
2	49	New Orleans Saints	Alontae Taylor	CB	Tennessee	
2	50	New England Patriots	Tyquan Thornton	WR	Baylor	from Miami via Kansas City (Note: No. 50: Miami → Kansas City → New England. Multiple trades: Miami → Kansas City (PD). See Round 1: Miami → Kansas City. Kansas City → New England (D). Kansas City traded a second-round selection (50th overall) to New England for a second- and fifth-round selection (54th and 158th overall).)
2	51	Philadelphia Eagles	Cam Jurgens ^{†}	C	Nebraska	
2	52	Pittsburgh Steelers	George Pickens ^{†}	WR	Georgia	
2	53	Indianapolis Colts	Alec Pierce	WR	Cincinnati	from Las Vegas via Green Bay and Minnesota (Note: No. 53: Las Vegas → Green Bay → Minnesota → Indianapolis. Multiple trades: Las Vegas → Green Bay (PD). See Round 1: Las Vegas → Green Bay. Green Bay → Minnesota (D). See Round 2: Minnesota → Green Bay. Minnesota → Indianapolis (D). See Round 2: Indianapolis → Minnesota.)
2	54	Kansas City Chiefs	Skyy Moore	WR	Western Michigan	from New England (Note: No. 54: New England → Kansas City (D). See Round 2: Kansas City → New England.)
2	55	Arizona Cardinals	Trey McBride ^{†}	TE	Colorado State	2021 John Mackey Award winner
2	56	Dallas Cowboys	Sam Williams	DE	Ole Miss	
2	57	Tampa Bay Buccaneers	Luke Goedeke	T	Central Michigan	from Buffalo (Note: No. 57: Buffalo → Tampa Bay (D). Buffalo traded a second-round selection (57th overall) to Tampa Bay for a second- and sixth-round selection (60th and 180th overall).)
2	58	Atlanta Falcons	Troy Andersen	LB	Montana State	from Tennessee (Note: No. 58: Tennessee → Atlanta (PD). Tennessee traded a second-round selection (58th overall) and a 2023 fourth-round selection to Atlanta in exchange for a 2023 sixth-round selection and WR Julio Jones.)
2	59	Minnesota Vikings	Ed Ingram	G	LSU	from Green Bay (Note: No. 59: Green Bay → Minnesota (D). See Round 2: No. 34: Minnesota → Green Bay.)
2	60	Cincinnati Bengals	Cam Taylor-Britt	CB	Nebraska	from Tampa Bay via Buffalo (Note: No. 60: Tampa Bay → Buffalo → Cincinnati. Multiple trades: Tampa Bay → Buffalo (D). See Round 2: Buffalo → Tampa Bay. Buffalo → Cincinnati (D). Buffalo traded a second-round selection (60th overall) to Cincinnati for a second- and sixth-round selection (63rd and 209th overall).)
2	61	San Francisco 49ers	Drake Jackson	DE	USC	
2	62	Kansas City Chiefs	Bryan Cook	S	Cincinnati	
2	63	Buffalo Bills	James Cook ^{†}	RB	Georgia	from Cincinnati (Note: No. 63: Cincinnati → Buffalo (D). See Round 2: Buffalo → Cincinnati.)
2	64	Denver Broncos	Nik Bonitto ^{†}	LB	Oklahoma	from LA Rams (Note: No. 64: LA Rams → Denver (PD). The LA Rams traded second- and third-round selections (64th and 96th overall) to Denver in exchange for LB Von Miller.)
3	65	Jacksonville Jaguars	Luke Fortner	C	Kentucky	
3	66	Minnesota Vikings	Brian Asamoah	LB	Oklahoma	from Detroit (Note: No. 66: Detroit → Minnesota (D). See Round 1: Minnesota → Detroit.)
3	67	New York Giants	Joshua Ezeudu	G	North Carolina	
3	68	Cleveland Browns	Martin Emerson	CB	Mississippi State	from Houston (Note: No. 68: Houston → Cleveland (D). See Round 2: Cleveland → Houston.)
3	69	Tennessee Titans	Nicholas Petit-Frere	T	Ohio State	from NY Jets (Note: No. 69: NY Jets → Tennessee (D). See Round 1: Tennessee → NY Jets.)
3	70	Jacksonville Jaguars	Chad Muma	LB	Wyoming	from Carolina (Note: No. 70: Carolina → Jacksonville (PD). Carolina traded a third-round selection (70th overall) and TE Dan Arnold to Jacksonville in exchange for a fifth-round selection (144th overall) and CB C. J. Henderson.)
3	71	Chicago Bears	Velus Jones Jr.	WR	Tennessee	
3	72	Seattle Seahawks	Abraham Lucas	T	Washington State	
3	73	Indianapolis Colts	Jelani Woods	TE	Virginia	from Washington (Note: No. 73: Washington → Indianapolis (PD). See Round 2: Washington → Indianapolis.)
3	74	Atlanta Falcons	Desmond Ridder	QB	Cincinnati	
3	75	Houston Texans	Christian Harris	LB	Alabama	from Denver (Note: No. 75: Denver → Houston (D). Denver traded a third-round selection (75th overall) to Houston in exchange for a third- and fifth-round selection (80th and 162nd overall).)
3	76	Baltimore Ravens	Travis Jones	DT	UConn	
3	77	Indianapolis Colts	Bernhard Raimann	T	Central Michigan	from Minnesota (Note: No. 77: Minnesota → Indianapolis (D). See Round 2: Indianapolis → Minnesota.)
3	78	Cleveland Browns	Alex Wright	DE	UAB	
3	79	Los Angeles Chargers	JT Woods	S	Baylor	
3	80	Denver Broncos	Greg Dulcich	TE	UCLA	from New Orleans via Houston (Note: No. 80: New Orleans → Houston → Denver. Multiple trades: New Orleans → Houston (PD). New Orleans traded a third-round selection (80th overall) and a 2023 conditional sixth-round selection to Houston in exchange for CB Bradley Roby. Houston → Denver (D). See Round 3: Denver → Houston.)
3	81	New York Giants	Cor'Dale Flott	CB	LSU	from Miami (Note: No. 81: Miami → NY Giants (PD). Miami traded a third-round selection (81st overall) and a 2021 second-round selection (50th overall) to the NY Giants in exchange for a 2021 second-round selection (42nd overall).)
3	82	Atlanta Falcons	DeAngelo Malone	DE	Western Kentucky	from Indianapolis (Note: No. 82: Indianapolis → Atlanta (PD). Indianapolis traded a third-round selection (82nd overall) to Atlanta in exchange for QB Matt Ryan.)
3	83	Philadelphia Eagles	Nakobe Dean	LB	Georgia	2021 Butkus Award winner
3	84	Pittsburgh Steelers	DeMarvin Leal	DE	Texas A&M	
3	85	New England Patriots	Marcus Jones	CB	Houston	2021 Jet Award and Paul Hornung Award winner
3	86	Tennessee Titans	Malik Willis	QB	Liberty	from Las Vegas (Note: No. 86: Las Vegas → Tennessee (D). Las Vegas traded a third-round selection (86th overall) to Tennessee in exchange for third- and fifth-round selections (90th and 169th overall).)
3	87	Arizona Cardinals	Cameron Thomas	DE	San Diego State	
3	88	Dallas Cowboys	Jalen Tolbert	WR	South Alabama	
3	89	Buffalo Bills	Terrel Bernard	LB	Baylor	
3	90	Las Vegas Raiders	Dylan Parham	G	Memphis	from Tennessee (Note: No. 90: Tennessee → Las Vegas (D). See Round 3: Las Vegas → Tennessee.)
3	91	Tampa Bay Buccaneers	Rachaad White	RB	Arizona State	
3	92	Green Bay Packers	Sean Rhyan	G	UCLA	
3	93	San Francisco 49ers	Tyrion Davis-Price	RB	LSU	
3	94	Carolina Panthers	Matt Corral	QB	Ole Miss	from Kansas City via New England (Note: No. 94: Kansas City → New England → Carolina (D). Multiple trades: Kansas City → New England (D). See Round 1: New England → Kansas City. New England → Carolina (D). New England traded a third-round selection (94th overall) to Carolina in exchange for a fourth-round selection (137th overall) and a 2023 third-round selection.)
3	95	Cincinnati Bengals	Zachary Carter	DT	Florida	
3	96	Indianapolis Colts	Nick Cross	S	Maryland	from LA Rams via Denver (Note: No. 96: LA Rams → Denver → Indianapolis (D). Multiple trades: LA Rams → Denver (PD). See Round 2: LA Rams → Denver. Denver → Indianapolis (D). Denver traded a third-round selection (96th overall) to Indianapolis in exchange for a fifth-round selection (179th overall) and a 2023 third-round selection.)
3*	97	Detroit Lions	Kerby Joseph	S	Illinois	
3*	98	Washington Commanders	Brian Robinson Jr.	RB	Alabama	from New Orleans (Note: No. 98: New Orleans → Washington (D). See Round 1: Washington → New Orleans.)
3×	99	Cleveland Browns	David Bell	WR	Purdue	Resolution JC-2A selection (Note: Cleveland received a third-round selection (99th overall) and a 2023 third-round selection as compensation for Minnesota hiring vice president of football operations Kwesi Adofo-Mensah as general manager.)
3×	100	Arizona Cardinals	Myjai Sanders	DE	Cincinnati	Resolution JC-2A selection (Note: Baltimore received a third-round selection (100th overall) and a 2021 third-round selection as compensation for Houston hiring assistant head coach and passing game coordinator David Culley as head coach.) from Baltimore (Note: No. 100: Baltimore → Arizona (D). See Round 1: Arizona → Baltimore.)
3×	101	New York Jets	Jeremy Ruckert	TE	Ohio State	Resolution JC-2A selection (Note: New Orleans received a third-round selection (101st overall) and a 2021 third-round selection as compensation for Atlanta hiring pro scouting director Terry Fontenot as general manager.) from New Orleans via Philadelphia and Tennessee (Note: No. 101: New Orleans → Philadelphia → Tennessee → NY Jets. Multiple trades: New Orleans → Philadelphia (PD). See Round 1: Philadelphia → New Orleans. Philadelphia → Tennessee (D). See Round 1: Philadelphia → Tennessee. Tennessee → N.Y Jets (D). See Round 1: Tennessee → NY Jets.)
3×	102	Miami Dolphins	Channing Tindall	LB	Georgia	Resolution JC-2A selection (Note: San Francisco received a third-round selection (102nd overall), a 2021 third-round selection and a 2023 third-round selection as compensation for the NY Jets hiring defensive coordinator Robert Saleh as head coach and Washington hiring vice president of player personnel Martin Mayhew as general manager.) from San Francisco (Note: No. 102: San Francisco → Miami (PD). See Round 1: San Francisco → Miami.)
3×	103	Kansas City Chiefs	Leo Chenal	LB	Wisconsin	Resolution JC-2A selection (Note: Kansas City received a third-round selection (103rd overall) and a 2023 third-round selection as compensation for Chicago hiring executive director of player personnel Ryan Poles as general manager.)
3×	104	Los Angeles Rams	Logan Bruss	G	Wisconsin	Resolution JC-2A selection (Note: The LA Rams received a third-round selection (104th overall) and a 2021 third-round selection as compensation for Detroit hiring college scouting director Brad Holmes as general manager.)
3×	105	San Francisco 49ers	Danny Gray	WR	SMU	Resolution JC-2A selection (Note: San Francisco received a third-round selection (105th overall) and another 2023 third-round selection when Miami hired offensive coordinator Mike McDaniel as head coach.)
4	106	Tampa Bay Buccaneers	Cade Otton	TE	Washington	from Jacksonville (Note: No. 106: Jacksonville → Tampa Bay (D). See Round 1: Tampa Bay → Jacksonville.)
4	107	Houston Texans	Dameon Pierce	RB	Florida	from Detroit via Cleveland (Note: No. 107: Detroit → Cleveland → Houston. Multiple trades: Detroit → Cleveland (PD). Detroit traded a fourth-round selection (107th overall) and a 2021 fifth-round selection to Cleveland in exchange for 2021 fourth- and seventh-round selections. Cleveland → Houston (PD). See Round 1: Cleveland → Houston.)
4	108	Cleveland Browns	Perrion Winfrey	DT	Oklahoma	from Houston (Note: No. 108: Houston → Cleveland (D). See Round 2: Cleveland → Houston.)
4	109	Seattle Seahawks	Coby Bryant	CB	Cincinnati	from NY Jets (Note: No. 109: NY Jets → Seattle (PD). See Round 1: Seattle → NY Jets.)
4	110	Baltimore Ravens	Daniel Faalele	T	Minnesota	from NY Giants (Note: No. 110: NY Giants → Baltimore (PD). The NY Giants traded a fourth-round selection (110th overall) to Baltimore in exchange for a fifth-round selection (173rd overall), a 2023 seventh-round selection and G Ben Bredeson.)
4	111	New York Jets	Max Mitchell	T	Louisiana	from Carolina (Note: No. 111: Carolina → NY Jets (PD). See Round 2: NY Jets → Carolina.)
4	112	New York Giants	Daniel Bellinger	TE	San Diego State	from Chicago (Note: No. 112: Chicago → NY Giants (PD). See Round 1: Chicago → NY Giants.)
4	113	Washington Commanders	Percy Butler	S	Louisiana	
4	114	New York Giants	Dane Belton	S	Iowa	from Atlanta (Note: No. 114: Atlanta → NY Giants (D). See Round 2: NY Giants → Atlanta.)
4	115	Denver Broncos	Damarri Mathis	CB	Pittsburgh	
4	116	Denver Broncos	Eyioma Uwazurike	DT	Iowa State	from Seattle (Note: No. 116: Seattle → Denver (PD). See Round 1: Denver → Seattle.)
4	117	New York Jets	Micheal Clemons	DE	Texas A&M	from Minnesota (Note: No. 117: Minnesota → NY Jets (PD). Minnesota traded a fourth-round selection (117th overall) to the NY Jets in exchange for a sixth-round selection (184th overall) and TE Chris Herndon.)
4	118	Minnesota Vikings	Akayleb Evans	CB	Missouri	from Cleveland (Note: No. 118: Cleveland → Minnesota (D). Cleveland traded a fourth-round selection (118th overall) to Minnesota in exchange for a fifth-round selection (156th overall) and a 2023 fourth-round selection.)
4	119	Baltimore Ravens	Jalyn Armour-Davis	CB	Alabama	
4	120	Carolina Panthers	Brandon Smith	LB	Penn State	from New Orleans via Washington (Note: No. 120: New Orleans → Washington → Carolina. Multiple trades: New Orleans → Washington (D). See Round 1: Washington → New Orleans. Washington → Carolina (D). Washington traded fourth- and sixth-round selections (120th and 189th overall) to Carolina in exchange for two fifth-round selections (144th and 149th overall).)
4	121	New England Patriots	Jack Jones	CB	Arizona State	from Miami via Kansas City (Note: No. 121: Miami → Kansas City → New England. Multiple trades: Miami → Kansas City (PD). See Round 1: Miami → Kansas City. Kansas City → New England (D). See Round 1: New England → Kansas City.)
4	122	Las Vegas Raiders	Zamir White	RB	Georgia	from Indianapolis via Minnesota (Note: No. 122: Indianapolis → Minnesota → Las Vegas. Multiple trades: Indianapolis → Minnesota (D). See Round 2: Indianapolis → Minnesota. Minnesota → Las Vegas (D). Minnesota traded fourth- and seventh-round selections (122nd and 250th overall) to Las Vegas in exchange for fourth- and seventh-round selections (126th and 227th overall).)
4	123	Los Angeles Chargers	Isaiah Spiller	RB	Texas A&M	
4	124	Cleveland Browns	Cade York	K	LSU	from Philadelphia via Houston (Note: No. 124: Philadelphia → Houston → Cleveland. Multiple trades: Philadelphia → Houston (PD). See Round 1: Houston → Philadelphia. Houston → Cleveland (D). See Round 2: Cleveland → Houston.)
4	125	Miami Dolphins	Erik Ezukanma	WR	Texas Tech	from Pittsburgh (Note: No. 125: Pittsburgh → Miami (PD). Pittsburgh traded a fourth-round selection (125th overall) to Miami in exchange for a 2021 fifth-round selection.)
4	126	Las Vegas Raiders	Neil Farrell Jr.	DT	LSU	from Las Vegas via Minnesota (Note: No. 126: Las Vegas → Minnesota → Las Vegas. Multiple trades: Las Vegas → Minnesota. See Round 4: Minnesota → Las Vegas. Minnesota → Las Vegas. Minnesota traded a fourth-round selection (126th overall) to Las Vegas in exchange for two fifth-round selections (165th and 169th overall).)
4	127	New England Patriots	Pierre Strong Jr.	RB	South Dakota State	
4	128	Baltimore Ravens	Charlie Kolar	TE	Iowa State	from Arizona (Note: No. 128: Arizona → Baltimore (PD). Arizona traded a fourth-round selection (128th overall) and a 2021 fifth-round selection to Baltimore in exchange for 2021 fourth- and sixth-round selections.)
4	129	Dallas Cowboys	Jake Ferguson ^{†}	TE	Wisconsin	
4	130	Baltimore Ravens	Jordan Stout ^{†}	P	Penn State	from Buffalo (Note: No. 130: Buffalo → Baltimore (D). See Round 1: Baltimore → Buffalo.)
4	131	Tennessee Titans	Hassan Haskins	RB	Michigan	
4	132	Green Bay Packers	Romeo Doubs	WR	Nevada	
4	133	Tampa Bay Buccaneers	Jake Camarda	P	Georgia	
4	134	San Francisco 49ers	Spencer Burford	T	UTSA	
4	135	Kansas City Chiefs	Joshua Williams	CB	Fayetteville State	
4	136	Cincinnati Bengals	Cordell Volson	T	North Dakota State	
4	137	New England Patriots	Bailey Zappe	QB	Western Kentucky	from LA Rams via Houston and Carolina (Note: No. 137: LA Rams → Houston → Carolina → New England. Multiple trades: LA Rams → Houston (PD). The LA Rams traded a fourth-round selection (137th overall) and WR Brandin Cooks to Houston in exchange for a 2020 second-round selection. Houston → Carolina (PD). Houston traded a fourth-round selection (137th overall), and 2021 fourth- and fifth-round selections to Carolina in exchange for a 2021 third-round selection (89th overall). Carolina → New England (D). See Round 3: Kansas City → New England → Carolina.)
4*	138	Pittsburgh Steelers	Calvin Austin	WR	Memphis	
4*	139	Baltimore Ravens	Isaiah Likely	TE	Coastal Carolina	
4*	140	Green Bay Packers	Zach Tom	G	Wake Forest	
4*	141	Baltimore Ravens	Damarion Williams	CB	Houston	
4*	142	Los Angeles Rams	Cobie Durant	CB	South Carolina State	
4*	143	Tennessee Titans	Chig Okonkwo	TE	Maryland	
5	144	Washington Commanders	Sam Howell	QB	North Carolina	from Jacksonville via Carolina (Note: No. 144: Jacksonville → Carolina → Washington. Multiple trades: Jacksonville → Carolina (PD). See Round 3: Carolina → Jacksonville. Carolina → Washington (D). See Round 4: New Orleans → Washington → Carolina.)
5	145	Kansas City Chiefs	Darian Kinnard	T	Kentucky	from Detroit via Denver and Seattle (Note: No. 145: Detroit → Denver → Seattle → Kansas City. Multiple trades: Detroit → Denver (PD). Detroit traded fifth- and seventh-round selections (145th and 234th overall) to Denver in exchange for a 2023 sixth-round selection and WR Trinity Benson. Denver → Seattle (PD). See Round 1: Denver → Seattle. Seattle → Kansas City (D). Seattle traded a fifth-round selection (145th overall) to Kansas City in exchange for fifth- and seventh-round selections (158th and 233rd overall).)
5	146	New York Giants	Micah McFadden	LB	Indiana	from NY Jets (Note: No. 146: NY Jets → NY Giants (D). See Round 2: NY Giants → NY Jets.)
5	147	New York Giants	DJ Davidson	DT	Arizona State	
5	148	Buffalo Bills	Khalil Shakir	WR	Boise State	from Houston via Chicago (Note: No. 148: Houston → Chicago → Buffalo. Multiple trades: Houston → Chicago (PD). Houston traded a fifth-round selection (148th overall) to Chicago in exchange for a seventh-round selection (228th overall) and WR Anthony Miller. Chicago → Buffalo (D). Chicago traded a fifth-round selection (148th overall) to Buffalo in exchange for fifth- and sixth-round draft selections (168th and 203rd overall).)
5	149	Washington Commanders	Cole Turner	TE	Nevada	from Carolina (Note: No. 149: Carolina → Washington (D). See Round 4: New Orleans → Washington → Carolina.)
5	150	Houston Texans	Thomas Booker	DT	Stanford	from Chicago (Note: No. 150: Chicago → Houston (D). Chicago traded a fifth-round selection (150th overall) to Houston in exchange for fifth- and sixth-round selections (166th and 207th overall).)
5	151	Atlanta Falcons	Tyler Allgeier	RB	BYU	
5	152	Denver Broncos	Delarrin Turner-Yell	S	Oklahoma	
5	153	Seattle Seahawks	Riq Woolen ^{†}	CB	UTSA	
5	154	Jacksonville Jaguars	Snoop Conner	RB	Ole Miss	from Washington via Philadelphia (Note: No. 154: Washington → Philadelphia → Jacksonville. Multiple trades: Washington → Philadelphia (PD). Washington traded a fifth-round selection (154th overall) to Philadelphia in exchange for 2021 sixth- and seventh-round selections. Philadelphia → Jacksonville (D). Philadelphia traded a fifth-round selection (154th overall) to Jacksonville in exchange for two sixth-round selections (188th and 198th overall).)
5	155	Dallas Cowboys	Matt Waletzko	T	North Dakota	from Cleveland (Note: No. 155: Cleveland → Dallas (PD). Cleveland traded fifth- and sixth-round selections (155th and 193th overall) to Dallas in exchange for a sixth-round selection (202nd overall) and WR Amari Cooper.)
5	156	Cleveland Browns	Jerome Ford	RB	Cincinnati	from Baltimore via Minnesota (Note: No. 156: Baltimore → Minnesota → Cleveland (D). Multiple trades: Baltimore → Minnesota (PD). Baltimore traded a conditional fifth-round selection (156th overall) and a 2021 third-round selection to Minnesota in exchange for DE Yannick Ngakoue. The fifth-round pick would have been upgraded to the fourth round if Ngakoue had been a first-ballot selection for the 2021 Pro Bowl (not as an alternate). This did not happen, so the pick remained in the fifth round. Minnesota → Cleveland (D). See Round 4: Cleveland → Minnesota.)
5	157	Tampa Bay Buccaneers	Zyon McCollum	CB	Sam Houston State	from Minnesota via Jacksonville (Note: No. 157: Minnesota → Jacksonville → Tampa Bay. Multiple trades: Minnesota → Jacksonville (PD). Minnesota traded a conditional fifth-round selection (157th overall) and a 2021 second-round selection to Jacksonville in exchange for DE Yannick Ngakoue. The fifth-round pick would have been upgraded to the fourth round if Ngakoue had been a first-ballot selection for the 2021 Pro Bowl (not as an alternate). This did not happen, so the pick remained in the fifth round. Jacksonville → Tampa Bay (D). Jacksonville traded fifth- and seventh-round selections (157th and 235th overall) to Tampa Bay in exchange for a 2023 fourth-round selection.)
5	158	Seattle Seahawks	Tyreke Smith	DE	Ohio State	from Miami via New England and Kansas City (Note: No. 158: Miami → New England → Kansas City → Seattle. Multiple trades: Miami → New England (PD). Miami traded a fifth-round selection (158th overall) and WR DeVante Parker to New England in exchange for a 2023 third-round selection. New England → Kansas City (D). See Round 2: Kansas City → New England. Kansas City → Seattle (D). See Round 5: Seattle → Kansas City.)
5	159	Indianapolis Colts	Eric Johnson	DT	Missouri State	
5	160	Los Angeles Chargers	Otito Ogbonnia	DT	UCLA	
5	161	New Orleans Saints	D'Marco Jackson	LB	Appalachian State	
5	162	Denver Broncos	Montrell Washington	WR	Samford	from Philadelphia via Houston (Note: No. 162: Philadelphia → Houston → Denver. Multiple trades: Philadelphia → Houston (D). See Round 1: Houston → Philadelphia. Houston → Denver (D). See Round 3: Denver → Houston.)
5	163	Tennessee Titans	Kyle Philips	WR	UCLA	from Pittsburgh via NY Jets (Note: No. 163: Pittsburgh → NY Jets → Tennessee. Multiple trades: Pittsburgh → NY Jets (PD). Pittsburgh traded a fifth-round selection (163rd overall) to the NY Jets in exchange for a seventh-round selection (225th overall) and LB Avery Williamson. NY Jets → Tennessee (D). See Round 1: Tennessee → NY Jets.)
5	164	Los Angeles Rams	Kyren Williams ^{†}	RB	Notre Dame	from New England via Las Vegas (Note: No. 164: New England → Las Vegas → LA Rams. Multiple trades: No. 164: New England → Las Vegas (PD). New England traded a fifth-round selection (164th overall) to Las Vegas in exchange for a seventh-round selection (243rd overall) and OT Trent Brown. Las Vegas → LA Rams (D). Las Vegas traded a fifth-round selection (164th overall) to the LA Rams in exchange for a fifth- and seventh-round selection (175th and 238th overall).)
5	165	Minnesota Vikings	Esezi Otomewo	DE	Minnesota	from Las Vegas (Note: No. 165: Las Vegas → Minnesota (D). See Round 4: Minnesota → Las Vegas.)
5	166	Cincinnati Bengals	Tycen Anderson	S	Toledo	from Arizona via Philadelphia, Houston and Chicago (Note: No. 166: Arizona → Philadelphia → Houston → Chicago → Cincinnati. Multiple trades: Arizona → Philadelphia (PD). Arizona traded a fifth-round selection (166th overall) and CB Tay Gowan to Philadelphia in exchange for TE Zach Ertz. Philadelphia → Houston (D). See Round 1: Houston → Philadelphia. Houston → Chicago (D). See Round 5: Chicago → Houston. Chicago → Cincinnati (D). Chicago traded a fifth-round selection (166th overall) to Cincinnati in exchange for fifth- and seventh-round selections (174th and 226th overall).)
5	167	Dallas Cowboys	DaRon Bland ^{†}	CB	Fresno State	
5	168	Chicago Bears	Braxton Jones	T	Southern Utah	from Buffalo (Note: No. 168: Buffalo → Chicago (D). See Round 5: Chicago → Buffalo.)
5	169	Minnesota Vikings	Ty Chandler	RB	North Carolina	from Tennessee via Las Vegas (Note: No. 169: Tennessee → Las Vegas → Minnesota. Multiple trades: Tennessee → Las Vegas (D). See Round 3: Las Vegas → Tennessee. Las Vegas → Minnesota (D). See Round 4: Minnesota → Las Vegas.)
5	170	Houston Texans	Teagan Quitoriano	TE	Oregon State	from Tampa Bay via New England (Note: No. 170: Tampa Bay → New England → Houston. Multiple trades: Tampa Bay → New England (PD). Tampa Bay traded a fifth-round selection (170th) to New England in exchange for G Shaq Mason. New England → Houston (PD). New England traded a fifth-round selection (170th overall) to Houston in exchange for sixth- and seventh-round selections (183rd and 245th overall).)
5	171	Denver Broncos	Luke Wattenberg	C	Washington	from Green Bay (Note: No. 171: Green Bay → Denver (D). Green Bay traded a fifth-round selection (171st overall) to Denver in exchange for a fifth- and seventh-round selection (179th and 234th overall).)
5	172	San Francisco 49ers	Samuel Womack	CB	Toledo	
5	173	New York Giants	Marcus McKethan	G	North Carolina	from Kansas City via Baltimore (Note: No. 173: Kansas City → Baltimore → NY Giants. Multiple trades: Kansas City → Baltimore (PD). Kansas City traded a fifth-round selection (173rd overall), and 2021 first-, third- and fourth-round selections to Baltimore in exchange for a sixth-round selection (191st overall), a 2021 second-round selection and OT Orlando Brown Jr. Baltimore → NY Giants (PD). See Round 4: NY Giants → Baltimore.)
5	174	Chicago Bears	Dominique Robinson	DE	Miami (OH)	from Cincinnati (Note: No. 174: Cincinnati → Chicago (D). See Round 5: Chicago → Cincinnati)
5	175	Las Vegas Raiders	Matthew Butler	DT	Tennessee	from LA Rams (Note: No. 175: LA Rams → Las Vegas (D). See Round 5: Las Vegas → LA Rams.)
5*	176	Dallas Cowboys	Damone Clark	LB	LSU	
5*	177	Detroit Lions	James Mitchell	TE	Virginia Tech	
5*	178	Dallas Cowboys	John Ridgeway III	DT	Arkansas	
5*	179	Green Bay Packers	Kingsley Enagbare	DE	South Carolina	from Indianapolis via Denver (Note: No. 179: Indianapolis → Denver → Green Bay. Multiple trades: Indianapolis → Denver (D). See Round 3: LA Rams → Denver → Indianapolis. Denver → Green Bay (D). See Round 5: Green Bay → Denver.)
6	180	Buffalo Bills	Matt Araiza	P	San Diego State	from Jacksonville via Tampa Bay (Note: No. 180: Jacksonville → Tampa Bay → Buffalo. Multiple trades: Jacksonville → Tampa Bay (D). See Round 1: Tampa Bay → Jacksonville. Tampa Bay → Buffalo (D). See Round 2: Buffalo → Tampa Bay.)
6	181	Philadelphia Eagles	Kyron Johnson	DE	Kansas	from Detroit (Note: No. 181: Detroit → Philadelphia (D). Detroit traded a sixth-round selection (181st overall) to Philadelphia in exchange for a sixth- and seventh-round selection (188th and 237th overall).)
6	182	New York Giants	Darrian Beavers	LB	Cincinnati	
6	183	New England Patriots	Kevin Harris	RB	South Carolina	from Houston (Note: No. 183: Houston → New England (PD). See Round 5: New England → Houston.)
6	184	Minnesota Vikings	Vederian Lowe	T	Illinois	from NY Jets (Note: No. 184: NY Jets → Minnesota (PD). See Round 4: Minnesota → NY Jets.)
6	185	Buffalo Bills	Christian Benford	CB	Villanova	from Carolina (Note: No. 185: Carolina → Buffalo (PD). Carolina traded a sixth-round selection (185th overall) to Buffalo in exchange for DE Darryl Johnson.)
6	186	Chicago Bears	Zachary Thomas	T	San Diego State	
6	187	San Francisco 49ers	Nick Zakelj	T	Fordham	from Denver (Note: No. 187: Denver → San Francisco (PD). Denver traded a sixth-round selection (187th overall) and a 2023 seventh-round selection to San Francisco in exchange for a seventh-round selection (250th overall) and LB Jonas Griffith.)
6	188	Detroit Lions	Malcolm Rodriguez	LB	Oklahoma State	from Seattle via Jacksonville and Philadelphia (Note: No. 188: Seattle → Jacksonville → Philadelphia → Detroit. Multiple trades: Seattle → Jacksonville (PD). Seattle traded a sixth-round selection (188th overall) to Jacksonville in exchange for CB Sidney Jones. Jacksonville → Philadelphia (D). See Round 5: Washington → Philadelphia → Jacksonville Philadelphia → Detroit (D). See Round 6: Detroit → Philadelphia)
6	189	Carolina Panthers	Amaré Barno	DE	Virginia Tech	from Washington (Note: No. 189: Washington → Carolina (D). See Round 4: New Orleans → Washington → Carolina.)
6	190	Atlanta Falcons	Justin Shaffer	G	Georgia	
6	191	Minnesota Vikings	Jalen Nailor	WR	Michigan State	from Baltimore via Kansas City (Note: No. 191: Baltimore → Kansas City → Minnesota. Multiple trades: Baltimore → Kansas City (PD). See Round 5: Kansas City → Baltimore. Kansas City → Minnesota (PD). Kansas City traded a sixth-round selection (191st overall) to Minnesota in exchange for a seventh-round selection (233rd overall) and CB Mike Hughes.)
6	192	Indianapolis Colts	Drew Ogletree	TE	Youngstown State	from Minnesota (Note: No. 192: Minnesota → Indianapolis (D). See Round 2: Indianapolis → Minnesota.)
6	193	Dallas Cowboys	Devin Harper	LB	Oklahoma State	from Cleveland (Note: No. 193: Cleveland → Dallas (PD). See Round 5: Cleveland → Dallas.)
6	194	New Orleans Saints	Jordan Jackson	DT	Air Force	from Indianapolis via Philadelphia (Note: No. 194: Indianapolis → Philadelphia → New Orleans. Multiple trades: Indianapolis → Philadelphia (PD). Indianapolis traded a sixth-round selection (194th overall) to Philadelphia in exchange for a seventh-round selection (240th overall) and G Matt Pryor. Philadelphia → New Orleans (PD). See Round 1: Philadelphia → New Orleans.)
6	195	Los Angeles Chargers	Jamaree Salyer	G	Georgia	
6	–	New Orleans Saints	Selection forfeited (Note: New Orleans forfeited a sixth-round selection as a penalty for repeated violations of the league's COVID-19 guidelines.)			
6	196	Baltimore Ravens	Tyler Badie	RB	Missouri	from Miami (Note: No. 196: Miami → Baltimore (PD). Miami traded a sixth-round selection (196th overall) to Baltimore in exchange for a seventh-round selection (224th overall) and C Greg Mancz.)
6	197	Jacksonville Jaguars	Gregory Junior	CB	Ouachita Baptist	from Philadelphia (Note: No. 197: Philadelphia → Jacksonville (PD). Philadelphia traded a conditional sixth-round selection (197th overall) to Jacksonville in exchange for QB Gardner Minshew.)
6	198	Philadelphia Eagles	Grant Calcaterra	TE	SMU	from Pittsburgh via Jacksonville (Note: No. 198: Pittsburgh → Jacksonville → Philadelphia. Multiple trades: Pittsburgh → Jacksonville (PD). Pittsburgh traded a sixth-round selection (198th overall) to Jacksonville in exchange for LB Joe Schobert. Jacksonville → Philadelphia (D). See Round 5: Washington → Philadelphia → Jacksonville)
6	199	Carolina Panthers	Cade Mays	G	Tennessee	from Las Vegas (Note: No. 199: Las Vegas → Carolina (PD). Las Vegas traded a sixth-round selection (199th overall) to Carolina in exchange for a seventh-round selection (227th overall) and LB Denzel Perryman.)
6	200	New England Patriots	Sam Roberts	DE	Northwest Missouri State	
6	201	Arizona Cardinals	Keaontay Ingram	RB	USC	
6	202	Cleveland Browns	Michael Woods II	WR	Oklahoma	from Dallas (Note: No. 202: Dallas → Cleveland (PD). See Round 5: Cleveland → Dallas.)
6	203	Chicago Bears	Trestan Ebner	RB	Baylor	from Buffalo (Note: No. 203: Buffalo → Chicago (D). See Round 5: Chicago → Buffalo.)
6	204	Tennessee Titans	Theo Jackson	S	Tennessee	
6	205	Houston Texans	Austin Deculus	T	LSU	from Green Bay (Note: No. 205: Green Bay → Houston (PD). Green Bay traded a sixth-round selection (205th overall) to Houston in exchange for WR Randall Cobb.)
6	206	Denver Broncos	Matt Henningsen	DT	Wisconsin	from Tampa Bay via NY Jets and Philadelphia (Note: No. 206: Tampa Bay → NY Jets → Philadelphia → Denver. Multiple trades: Tampa Bay → NY Jets (PD). Tampa Bay traded a sixth-round selection (206th overall) to the NY Jets in exchange for a 2023 seventh-round selection and DT Steve McLendon. NY Jets → Philadelphia (PD). The NY Jets traded a conditional sixth-round selection (206th overall) to Philadelphia in exchange for QB Joe Flacco. The pick would have been upgraded to the fifth round if Flacco had met playing time conditions. Philadelphia → Denver (PD). Philadelphia traded a sixth-round selection (206th overall) to Denver in exchange for CB Kary Vincent Jr.)
6	207	Chicago Bears	Doug Kramer	C	Illinois	from San Francisco via NY Jets and Houston (Note: No. 207: San Francisco → NY Jets → Houston → Chicago. Multiple trades: San Francisco → NY Jets (PD). San Francisco traded a sixth-round selection (207th overall) to the NY Jets in exchange for a 2021 seventh-round selection and LB Jordan Willis. NY Jets → Houston (PD). The NY Jets traded a sixth-round selection (207th overall) to Houston in exchange for LB Shaq Lawson. Houston → Chicago (D). See Round 5: Chicago → Houston.)
6	208	Pittsburgh Steelers	Connor Heyward	TE	Michigan State	from Kansas City (Note: No. 208: Kansas City → Pittsburgh (PD). Kansas City traded a sixth-round selection (208th overall) to Pittsburgh in exchange for DE Melvin Ingram.)
6	209	Buffalo Bills	Luke Tenuta	T	Virginia Tech	from Cincinnati (Note: No. 209: Cincinnati → Buffalo (D). See Round 2: Buffalo → Cincinnati.)
6	210	New England Patriots	Chasen Hines	G	LSU	from LA Rams (Note: No. 210: LA Rams → New England (PD). The LA Rams traded a sixth-round selection (210th overall) and a 2023 fourth-round selection to New England in exchange for RB Sony Michel.)
6*	211	Los Angeles Rams	Quentin Lake	S	UCLA	
6*	212	Los Angeles Rams	Derion Kendrick	CB	Georgia	
6*	213	Atlanta Falcons	John FitzPatrick	TE	Georgia	
6*	214	Los Angeles Chargers	Ja'Sir Taylor	CB	Wake Forest	
6*	215	Arizona Cardinals	Lecitus Smith	G	Virginia Tech	
6*	216	Indianapolis Colts	Curtis Brooks	DT	Cincinnati	
6*	217	Detroit Lions	James Houston IV	LB	Jackson State	
6*	218	Tampa Bay Buccaneers	Ko Kieft	TE	Minnesota	from LA Rams (Note: No. 218: LA Rams → Tampa Bay. The LA Rams traded a sixth-round selection (218th overall) to Tampa Bay in exchange for two seventh-round selections (235th and 261st overall).)
6*	219	Tennessee Titans	Chance Campbell	LB	Ole Miss	
6*	220	San Francisco 49ers	Kalia Davis	DT	UCF	
6*	221	San Francisco 49ers	Tariq Castro-Fields	CB	Penn State	
7	222	Jacksonville Jaguars	Montaric Brown	CB	Arkansas	
7	223	Cleveland Browns	Isaiah Thomas	DE	Oklahoma	from Detroit (Note: No. 223: Detroit → Cleveland (PD). Detroit traded a conditional seventh-round selection (223rd overall) in exchange for a seventh-round selection (234th overall) and QB David Blough.)
7	224	Miami Dolphins	Cameron Goode	LB	California	from Houston via New England and Baltimore (Note: No. 224: Houston → New England → Baltimore → Miami . Multiple trades: Houston → New England (PD). Houston traded a seventh-round selection (224th overall) to New England in exchange for TE Ryan Izzo. New England → Baltimore (PD). New England traded a seventh-round selection (224th overall) and a 2023 fifth-round selection to Baltimore in exchange for CB Shaun Wade. Baltimore → Miami (PD). See Round 6: Miami → Baltimore.)
7	225	Pittsburgh Steelers	Mark Robinson	LB	Ole Miss	from NY Jets (Note: No. 225: NY Jets → Pittsburgh (PD). See Round 5: Pittsburgh → NY Jets.)
7	226	Chicago Bears	Ja'Tyre Carter	T	Southern	from NY Giants via Cincinnati (Note: No. 226: NY Giants → Cincinnati → Chicago. Multiple trades: NY Giants → Cincinnati (PD). The NY Giants traded a conditional seventh-round selection (226th overall) and DT B. J. Hill to Cincinnati in exchange for C Billy Price. Cincinnati → Chicago (D). See Round 5: Chicago → Cincinnati)
7	227	Minnesota Vikings	Nick Muse	TE	South Carolina	from Carolina via Las Vegas (Note: No. 227: Carolina → Las Vegas → Minnesota. Multiple trades: Carolina → Las Vegas (PD). See Round 6: Las Vegas → Carolina. Las Vegas → Minnesota. See Round 4: Minnesota → Las Vegas.)
7	228	Green Bay Packers	Tariq Carpenter	S	Georgia Tech	from Chicago via Houston (Note: No. 228: Chicago → Houston → Green Bay. Multiple trades: Chicago → Houston (PD). See Round 5: Houston → Chicago. Houston → Green Bay (PD). Houston traded a seventh-round selection (228th overall) to Green Bay in exchange for CB Ka'dar Hollman.)
7	229	Seattle Seahawks	Bo Melton	WR	Rutgers	
7	230	Washington Commanders	Chris Paul	G	Tulsa	
7	231	Buffalo Bills	Baylon Spector	LB	Clemson	from Atlanta (Note: No. 231: Atlanta → Buffalo (PD). Atlanta traded a seventh-round selection (231st overall) to Buffalo in exchange for TE Lee Smith.)
7	232	Denver Broncos	Faion Hicks	CB	Wisconsin	
7	233	Seattle Seahawks	Dareke Young	WR	Lenoir–Rhyne	from Minnesota via Kansas City (Note: No. 233: Minnesota → Kansas City → Seattle. Multiple trades: Minnesota → Kansas City (PD). See Round 6: Kansas City → Minnesota. Kansas City → Seattle (D). See Round 5: Seattle → Kansas City.)
7	234	Green Bay Packers	Jonathan Ford	DT	Miami (FL)	from Cleveland via Detroit and Denver (Note: No. 234: Cleveland → Detroit → Denver → Green Bay. Multiple trades: Cleveland → Detroit (PD). See Round 7: Detroit → Cleveland. Detroit → Denver (PD). See Round 5: Detroit → Denver. Denver → Green Bay (D). See Round 5: Green Bay → Denver.)
7	235	Los Angeles Rams	Daniel Hardy	DE	Montana State	from Baltimore via Jacksonville and Tampa Bay (Note: No. 235: Baltimore → Jacksonville → Tampa Bay → LA Rams. Multiple trades: Baltimore → Jacksonville (PD). Baltimore traded a conditional seventh-round selection (235th overall) to Jacksonville in exchange for TE Josh Oliver. The trade was conditional on Oliver making Baltimore's roster in 2021. Jacksonville → Tampa Bay (D). See Round 5: Jacksonville → Tampa Bay. Tampa Bay → LA Rams (D). See Round 6: LA Rams → Tampa Bay.)
7	236	Los Angeles Chargers	Deane Leonard	CB	Ole Miss	
7	237	Detroit Lions	Chase Lucas	CB	Arizona State	from New Orleans via Philadelphia (Note: No. 237: New Orleans → Philadelphia → Detroit. Multiple trades: New Orleans → Philadelphia (PD). See Round 1: Philadelphia → New Orleans. Philadelphia → Detroit (D). See Round 6: Detroit → Philadelphia)
7	238	Las Vegas Raiders	Thayer Munford	T	Ohio State	from Miami via LA Rams (Note: No. 238: Miami → LA Rams → Las Vegas. Multiple trades: Miami → LA Rams (PD). Miami traded a seventh-round selection (238th overall) to the LA Rams in exchange for a 2020 fifth-round selection and CB Aqib Talib. LA Rams → Las Vegas (D). See Round 5: Las Vegas → LA Rams)
7	239	Indianapolis Colts	Rodney Thomas II	S	Yale	
7	240	Washington Commanders	Christian Holmes	CB	Oklahoma State	from Philadelphia via Indianapolis (Note: No. 240: Philadelphia → Indianapolis → Washington. Multiple trades: Philadelphia → Indianapolis (PD). See Round 6: Indianapolis → Philadelphia. Indianapolis → Washington (PD). See Round 2: Washington → Indianapolis.)
7	241	Pittsburgh Steelers	Chris Oladokun	QB	South Dakota State	
7	242	Carolina Panthers	Kalon Barnes	CB	Baylor	from New England via Miami (Note: No. 242: New England → Miami → Carolina. Multiple trades: New England → Miami (PD). New England traded a conditional seventh-round selection (242nd overall) to Miami in exchange for WR Isaiah Ford. Miami → Carolina (PD). Miami traded a seventh-round selection (242nd overall) to the Carolina Panthers in exchange for OT Greg Little.)
7	243	Kansas City Chiefs	Jaylen Watson	CB	Washington State	from Las Vegas via New England (Note: No. 243: Las Vegas → New England → Kansas City. Multiple trades: Las Vegas → New England (PD). See Round 5: New England → Las Vegas. New England → Kansas City (PD). New England traded a seventh-round selection (243rd overall) to Kansas City in exchange for OT Yasir Durant.)
7	244	Arizona Cardinals	Christian Matthew	CB	Valdosta State	
7	245	New England Patriots	Andrew Stueber	G	Michigan	from Dallas via Houston (Note: No. 245: Dallas → Houston → New England. Multiple trades: Dallas → Houston (PD). Dallas traded a seventh-round selection (245th overall) to Houston in exchange for DT Eli Ankou. Houston → New England (PD). See Round 5: New England → Houston.)
7	246	Cleveland Browns	Dawson Deaton	C	Texas Tech	from Buffalo (Note: No. 246: Buffalo → Cleveland (PD). Buffalo traded a seventh-round selection (246th overall) to Cleveland in exchange for QB Case Keenum.)
7	247	Miami Dolphins	Skylar Thompson	QB	Kansas State	from Tennessee (Note: No. 247: Tennessee → Miami (PD). Tennessee traded a seventh-round selection (247th overall) and OT Isaiah Wilson to Miami in exchange for a 2021 seventh-round selection.)
7	248	Tampa Bay Buccaneers	Andre Anthony	DE	LSU	
7	249	Green Bay Packers	Rasheed Walker	T	Penn State	
7	250	Las Vegas Raiders	Brittain Brown	RB	UCLA	from San Francisco via Denver and Minnesota (Note: No. 250: San Francisco → Denver → Minnesota. Multiple trades: San Francisco → Denver (PD). See Round 6: Denver → San Francisco. Denver → Minnesota (PD). Denver traded a seventh-round selection (250th overall) to Minnesota in exchange for DE Stephen Weatherly and a 2023 seventh-round selection. Minnesota → Las Vegas. See Round 4: Minnesota → Las Vegas.)
7	251	Kansas City Chiefs	Isiah Pacheco	RB	Rutgers	
7	252	Cincinnati Bengals	Jeffrey Gunter	DE	Coastal Carolina	
7	253	Los Angeles Rams	Russ Yeast	S	Kansas State	
7*	254	Chicago Bears	Elijah Hicks	S	California	from LA Chargers (Note: No. 254: LA Chargers → Chicago (D). The LA Chargers traded two seventh-round selections (254th and 255th overall) to Chicago in exchange for a 2023 sixth-round selection.)
7*	255	Chicago Bears	Trenton Gill	P	NC State	from LA Chargers (Note: No. 255: LA Chargers → Chicago (D). See Round 7: LA Chargers → Chicago.)
7*	256	Arizona Cardinals	Jesse Luketa	LB	Penn State	
7*	257	Arizona Cardinals	Marquis Hayes	G	Oklahoma	
7*	258	Green Bay Packers	Samori Toure	WR	Nebraska	
7*	259	Kansas City Chiefs	Nazeeh Johnson	S	Marshall	
7*	260	Los Angeles Chargers	Zander Horvath	FB	Purdue	
7*	261	Los Angeles Rams	A. J. Arcuri	T	Michigan State	from Tampa Bay (Note: No. 261: Tampa Bay → LA Rams (D). See Round 6: LA Rams → Tampa Bay.)
7*	262	San Francisco 49ers	Brock Purdy ^{†}	QB	Iowa State	Mr. Irrelevant

== Notable undrafted players ==
Original NFL team	Player	Pos.	College	Notes
Arizona Cardinals	Darrell Baker Jr.	CB	Georgia Southern	
Arizona Cardinals	Chandler Wooten	LB	Auburn	
Atlanta Falcons	Timmy Horne	DT	Kansas State	
Atlanta Falcons	Nate Landman	LB	Colorado	
Buffalo Bills	Alec Anderson	T	UCLA	
Buffalo Bills	Raheem Blackshear	RB	Virginia Tech	
Buffalo Bills	Ja'Marcus Ingram	CB	Buffalo	
Carolina Panthers	Arron Mosby	LB	Fresno State	
Chicago Bears	Jaylon Jones	CB	Ole Miss	
Chicago Bears	Jack Sanborn	LB	Wisconsin	
Chicago Bears	Jake Tonges	TE	California	
Cincinnati Bengals	Cal Adomitis	LS	Pittsburgh	
Cincinnati Bengals	Ben Brown	C	Ole Miss	
Cleveland Browns	D'Anthony Bell	S	West Florida	
Cleveland Browns	Brock Hoffman	C	Virginia Tech	
Dallas Cowboys	Brandon Aubrey ^{†}	K	Notre Dame	Played college soccer; drafted in 2022 USFL draft
Dallas Cowboys	Markquese Bell	S	Florida A&M	
Dallas Cowboys	Malik Davis	RB	Florida	
Denver Broncos	Brandon Johnson	WR	UCF	
Denver Broncos	Ja'Quan McMillian	CB	East Carolina	
Denver Broncos	Dondrea Tillman	LB	IUP	
Green Bay Packers	Tyler Goodson	RB	Iowa	
Houston Texans	Jake Hansen	LB	Illinois	
Houston Texans	Kurt Hinish	DT	Notre Dame	
Indianapolis Colts	Dallis Flowers	CB	Pittsburg State	
Indianapolis Colts	Ryan Van Demark	T	UConn	
Kansas City Chiefs	Mike Caliendo	G	Western Michigan	
Kansas City Chiefs	Jack Cochrane	LB	South Dakota	
Las Vegas Raiders	Isaiah Pola-Mao	S	USC	
Las Vegas Raiders	Luke Masterson	LB	Wake Forest	
Las Vegas Raiders	Sincere McCormick	RB	UTSA	
Las Vegas Raiders	Sam Webb	CB	Missouri Western	
Los Angeles Chargers	Stone Smartt	TE	Old Dominion	
Los Angeles Rams	Cameron Dicker ^{†}	K	Texas	
Los Angeles Rams	Jake Hummel	LB	Iowa State	
Miami Dolphins	Kader Kohou	CB	Texas A&M–Commerce	
Minnesota Vikings	Ryan Wright	P	Tulane	
New England Patriots	Brenden Schooler ^{†}	S	Texas	
New Orleans Saints	Abram Smith	RB	Baylor	All-XFL Team 2023; drafted in 2023 XFL draft
New Orleans Saints	John Parker Romo	K	Virginia Tech	
New Orleans Saints	Lucas Krull	TE	Pittsburgh	
New Orleans Saints	Nephi Sewell	LB	Utah	
New Orleans Saints	Rashid Shaheed ^{†}	WR	Weber State	
New Orleans Saints	Daniel Whelan	P	UC Davis	
New York Jets	Tony Adams	S	Illinois	
New York Jets	Zonovan Knight	RB	NC State	
Philadelphia Eagles	Josh Blackwell	CB	Duke	
Philadelphia Eagles	Reed Blankenship	S	Middle Tennessee	
Philadelphia Eagles	Britain Covey	WR	Utah	
Philadelphia Eagles	Josh Jobe	CB	Alabama	
Pittsburgh Steelers	Jaylen Warren	RB	Oklahoma State	
San Francisco 49ers	Jordan Mason	RB	Georgia Tech	
Tampa Bay Buccaneers	Dylan Cook	T	Montana	
Tennessee Titans	Tre Avery	CB	Rutgers	
Tennessee Titans	Julius Chestnut	RB	Sacred Heart	
Tennessee Titans	Jack Gibbens	LB	Minnesota	
Tennessee Titans	Xavier Newman-Johnson	G	Baylor	
Tennessee Titans	Ryan Stonehouse	P	Colorado State	

== Trades ==
(PD) indicates trades completed prior to the start of the draft (i.e. Pre-Draft), while (D) denotes trades which took place during the 2022 draft.

Round 1

Round 2

Round 3

Round 4

Round 5

Round 6

Round 7

== Resolution JC-2A selections ==
Resolution JC-2A, enacted by the NFL in November 2020, rewards teams for developing minority candidates for head coach and/or general manager positions. The resolution rewards teams whose minority candidates are hired away for one of those positions by awarding draft selections, which are at the end of the third round, after standard compensatory selections; if multiple teams qualify, they are awarded by draft order in the first round. These picks are in addition to, and have no impact on, the standard 32 compensatory selections. Seven picks were awarded for the 2022 draft pursuant to the resolution.

== Notes ==
Forfeited selections

== Summary ==
=== Selections by NCAA conference ===
Conference	Round 1	Round 2	Round 3	Round 4	Round 5	Round 6	Round 7	Total
NCAA Division I FBS football conferences
American	2	3	5	3	1	4	1	19
ACC	4	1	2	2	4	4	4	21
Big 12	0	4	3	4	1	5	8	24
Big Ten	7	7	7	7	3	7	10	48
C-USA	0	0	2	2	1	0	1	6
Ind. (FBS)	1	0	2	0	2	0	0	5
MAC	0	2	1	0	3	0	0	6
MW	0	1	2	2	3	3	0	11
Pac-12	4	2	4	2	6	2	5	25
SEC	12	10	12	9	6	11	5	65
Sun Belt	0	0	1	3	1	0	1	6
NCAA Division I FCS football conferences
Big Sky	0	1	0	0	1	0	1	3
CAA	0	0	0	0	0	1	0	1
Ivy	0	0	0	0	0	0	1	1
MEAC	0	0	0	1	0	0	0	1
MVFC	1	1	0	2	2	1	1	8
Patriot	0	0	0	0	0	1	0	1
SoCon	1	0	0	0	1	0	0	2
SWAC	0	0	0	0	0	1	1	2
WAC	0	0	0	0	1	0	0	1
Non-Division I NCAA football conferences
CIAA (DII)	0	0	0	1	0	0	0	1
GAC (DII)	0	0	0	0	0	1	0	1
Gulf South (DII)	0	0	0	0	0	0	1	1
MIAA (DII)	0	0	0	0	0	1	0	1
SAC (DII)	0	0	0	0	0	0	1	1

=== Colleges with multiple draft selections ===
Selections	Colleges
15	Georgia
10	LSU
9	Cincinnati
8	Penn State
7	Alabama, Oklahoma
6	Baylor, Ohio State, Ole Miss, UCLA
5	Michigan, Tennessee, Wisconsin
4	Arizona State, Iowa State, Kentucky, Michigan State, Minnesota, North Carolina, San Diego State, Texas A&M, Virginia Tech, Washington
3	Arkansas, Florida, Houston, Illinois, Nebraska, Oklahoma State, Purdue, South Carolina, USC
2	California, Central Michigan, Clemson, Coastal Carolina, Iowa, Kansas State, Louisiana, Maryland, Memphis, Mississippi State, Missouri, Montana State, NC State, Nevada, North Dakota State, Notre Dame, Pittsburgh, Rutgers, SMU, South Dakota State, Texas Tech, Toledo, Tulsa, UTSA, Wake Forest, Washington State, Western Kentucky

=== Selections by position ===
Position	Round 1	Round 2	Round 3	Round 4	Round 5	Round 6	Round 7	Total
Center	1	1	1	0	1	1	1	6
Cornerback	4	5	3	8	4	5	8	37
Defensive end	5	5	4	1	4	1	3	23
Defensive tackle	2	1	1	3	5	4	1	17
Fullback	0	0	0	0	0	0	1	1
Guard	3	1	3	1	1	5	4	18
Kicker	0	0	0	1	0	0	0	1
Linebacker	2	4	8	1	3	5	4	27
Offensive tackle	5	1	4	4	3	5	3	25
Punter	0	0	0	2	0	1	1	4
Quarterback	1	0	3	1	1	0	3	9
Running back	0	3	3	5	5	4	2	22
Safety	3	3	3	2	2	2	5	20
Tight end	0	1	3	6	3	4	1	18
Wide receiver	6	7	4	3	3	2	3	28

Position	Round 1	Round 2	Round 3	Round 4	Round 5	Round 6	Round 7	Total
Offense	16	14	21	20	17	22	18	128
Defense	16	18	20	15	19	19	22	129
Special teams	0	0	0	3	0	1	1	5
