= Emira D'Spain =

American model and social media influencer (born 1996)

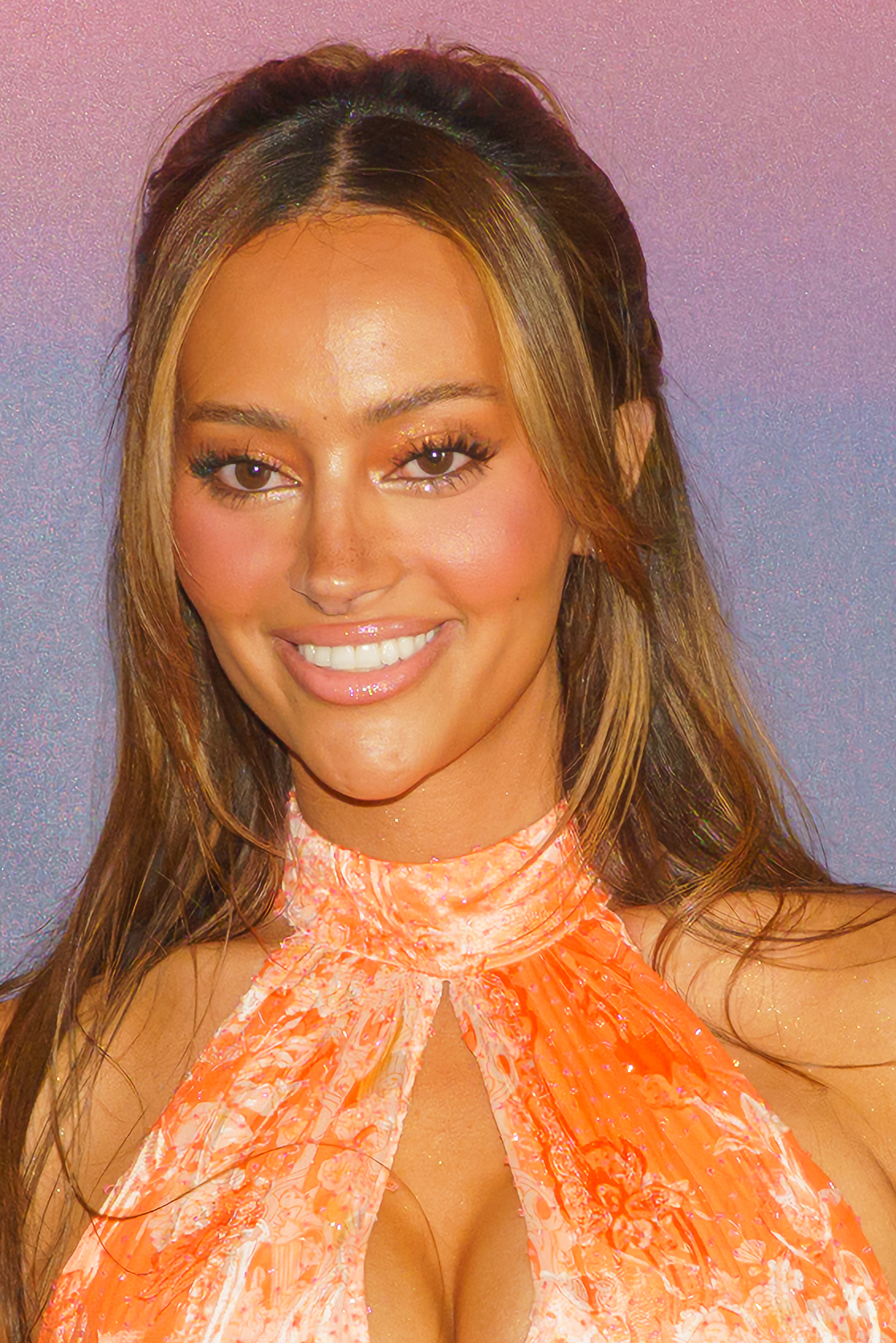
- D'Spain in 2026
- Born: October 8, 1996 (age 29); Sharjah, Emirate of Sharjah, United Arab Emirates
- Education: New York University
- Occupations: Model; TikToker; Television personality
- Modeling information
- Height: 5 ft 10 in (178 cm)
- Hair color: Brown
- Eye color: Brown
- Agency: UTA

TikTok information
- Page: xoxoemira
- Followers: 1.5M
- Last updated: August 8, 2026

Emira D'Spain (born October 8, 1996) is an American model, social media influencer, television personality, and former beauty director. In 2022, she became the first Black transgender woman to model for Victoria's Secret. She has also been a cover girl for Glamour and was featured in Nylon. D'Spain has modeled for Fenty Beauty, UGG, Anastasia Beverly Hills, and NARS Cosmetics. She worked as the beauty director for Paper prior to the magazine's folding in 2023. D'Spain is a beauty content creator on TikTok, where she has over one million followers. In 2025, she joined the cast of Bravo's reality television series Next Gen NYC.

== Early life and education ==
D'Spain was born on October 8, 1996, in Sharjah, United Arab Emirates, to an Eritrean mother and a Polish father. After living in Dubai for three years, her family emigrated to the United States. She lived in Kansas City and Tampa before her family settled in Dallas, where she attended a fine arts school. She grew up doing competition dance.

She attended New York University, first majoring in Global Liberal Studies before transferring to the university's Steinhardt School of Culture, Education, and Human Development and Stern School of Business, graduating magna cum laude with a degree in marketing and communications. D'Spain also studied in Paris her freshman year of college.

== Career ==
Prior to becoming a beauty influencer, D'Spain worked for a marketing agency and then became the Beauty Director of Paper Magazine. She was featured on the cover of Galore Magazine as "TikTok's It-Girl". She also was featured in Nylon.

D'Spain has modeled and been in advertisements for NARS Cosmetics, Anastasia Beverly Hills, UGG, Fenty Beauty, and Google. She was the first black transgender woman to model for Victoria's Secret. Her first online partnership with Victoria's Secret was a TikTok video titled Single Girl's Guide to the Perfect Valentine's Day as part of their 2022 Valentine's Day campaign.

She is known as @XOXOEMIRA on TikTok, where she has over one million followers, and on Instagram, where she has over 421,000 followers. On her TikTok account, D'Spain posts Get Ready With Me videos, which have received over 85 million views. Prior to the magazine's folding in 2023, she had a Snapchat show called Snatchural with Paper. She also worked as the Beauty Director at Paper, creating beauty content for their website and social media platforms and curated their YouTube channel.

In 2025, D'Spain joined the cast of the reality television series Next Gen NYC, which premiered on Bravo on June 3, 2025. Upon making her debut in reality television, D'Spain became the first-known transgender full-time cast member on the network.

== Personal life ==
D'Spain changed her given name to "Emira", after the Arabic word "Amira", meaning "princess". She underwent gender confirmation surgery. She has also had two rhinoplasty procedures.

She shared on The Conversational Podcast that she was sexually assaulted in Paris in 2018.

== Filmography ==
=== Television ===
Key
| † | Denotes television productions that have not yet been released |

| Year | Title | Role | Notes | Ref |
|---|---|---|---|---|
| 2025–present | Next Gen NYC | Main cast | Season 1–present | |
| 2027 | The Traitors † | Contestant | Season 6 | |
