= Next Gen NYC =

- Genre: Reality
- Starring: Ariana Biermann; Riley Burruss; Ava Dash; Emira D'Spain; Shai Fruchter; Gia Giudice; Brooks Marks; Georgia McCann; Hudson McLeroy; Charlie Zakkour; Rowan Henchy; Liam Obergfoll
- Country of origin: United States
- Original language: English
- No. of seasons: 2
- No. of episodes: 22

Production
- Executive producers: Ariel Algus; Michaline Babich; Shari Levine; Chaz Morgan; Lauren Nathan; Michelle Schiefen; Glenda Hersh; Steven Weinstock; Lauren Eskelin
- Camera setup: Multiple
- Running time: 41–43 minutes
- Production companies: 9th Degree; Truly Original (season 2-present)

Original release
- Network: Bravo
- Release: June 3, 2025 – present

Next Gen NYC is an American reality television series that premiered on June 3, 2025, on Bravo. The series follows a tangled web of friends raised in the spotlight as they stumble into adulthood living in New York City.

== Overview ==
Bravo announced the series in April 2025. The reality series stars the children of multiple Real Housewives cast members, as well as several influencers and other Manhattan up-and-comers.

=== Season 1 ===
The first season premiered on June 3, 2025, and stars Ariana Biermann, Riley Burruss, Ava Dash, Emira D'Spain, Shai Fruchter, Gia Giudice, Brooks Marks, Georgia McCann, Hudson McLeroy and Charlie Zakkour. Dylan Geick and Brooks' sister Chloe Marks appeared in a recurring capacity. Biermann, Burruss, Giudice, and Marks, are the children of Real Housewives stars Kim Zolciak, Kandi Burruss, Teresa Giudice and Meredith Marks, respectively.

=== Season 2 ===
In October 2025, the series was renewed for a second season, with the entire cast from the first season returning. The trailer for the season was released on May 11, 2026, with a premiere date of June 24, 2026. New cast members set to join the series include Liam Obergfoll, Kendall White, and Rowan Henchy. Henchy is the daughter of actress and model Brooke Shields.

=== Season 3 ===
In October 2026, the series was renewed for a third season, with the Next Gen franchise now being expanded to Atlanta, officially titled Next Gen ATL.

== Cast ==
Cast member	Seasons	
Cast member	1	2
Ariana Biermann	Main	Main
Riley Burruss	Main	Main
Ava Dash	Main	Main
Emira D'Spain	Main	Main
Shai Fruchter	Main	Main
Gia Giudice	Main	Main
Brooks Marks	Main	Main
Georgia McCann	Main	Main
Hudson McLeroy	Main	Main
Charlie Zakkour	Main	Main
Rowan Henchy		Main
Liam Obergfoll		Main
Friends of the cast
Dylan Geick	Friend	
Chloe Marks	Friend	Guest
Kendall White		Friend

== Episodes ==
=== Series overview ===
Season	Episodes	Originally released	
Season	Episodes	First released	Last released
1	8	June 3, 2025	July 22, 2025
2	14	June 24, 2026	September 23, 2026

=== Season 1 (2025) ===
No. overall	No. in season	Title	Original release date	U.S. viewers (millions)
1	1	"Welcome to New York"	June 3, 2025	0.26
2	2	"What Happens in Brooklyn"	June 10, 2025	0.25
3	3	"Daddy Issues and Poolside Tissues"	June 17, 2025	0.25
4	4	"Apology Not Included"	June 24, 2025	0.25
5	5	"Zero Bucks Given"	July 1, 2025	0.28
6	6	"Boardwalk of Shame"	July 8, 2025	0.30
7	7	"Shore Losers"	July 15, 2025	0.27
8	8	"Gutter Balls & Breakup Calls"	July 22, 2025	0.28

=== Season 2 (2026) ===
No. overall	No. in season	Title	Original release date	U.S. viewers (millions)
9	1	"Serving Country"	June 24, 2026	0.30
10	2	"Bad Influencer"	July 1, 2026	0.27
11	3	"The Man in the LED Mask"	July 8, 2026	0.28
12	4	"TikTok Boom"	July 15, 2026	0.27
13	5	"Brooklyn Horror Story"	July 22, 2026	0.31
14	6	"Left on Read"	July 29, 2026	0.33
15	7	"Talk to My Agent"	August 5, 2026	N/A
16	8	"BravoCon Loading"	August 12, 2026	N/A
17	9	"No EffsGiving"	August 19, 2026	N/A
18	10	"You Windham, You Lose Some"	August 26, 2026	N/A
19	11	"The Bunny Hill I Die On"	September 2, 2026	N/A
20	12	"Lady and the Train"	September 9, 2026	N/A
21	13	"Reunion Part 1"	September 16, 2026	N/A
22	14	"Reunion Part 2"	September 23, 2026	N/A

== International broadcast ==
In Australia, the series premiered on 7Bravo on 30 April 2026.
