= Caesars Forum =

- Interactive map of the Caesars Forum area

General information
- Type: Convention center
- Location: 3911 Koval Lane, Paradise, Nevada, United States
- Coordinates: 36.118647°N 115.166253°W
- Groundbreaking: July 16, 2018
- Topped-out: June 13, 2019
- Opened: October 25, 2020
- Cost: $375 million
- Owner: Caesars Entertainment

Technical details
- Grounds: 28 acres (11 ha)

Design and construction
- Architecture firm: The Friedmutter Group
- Main contractor: Penta Building Group

Website
- caesarsforum.com

Caesars Forum is a convention center located in Paradise, Nevada, east of the Las Vegas Strip. It is owned and operated by Caesars Entertainment. Development of the project began around early 2017, and construction started in July 2018. The facility opened on October 25, 2020. It has 550,000 sq ft (51,000 m^{2}) of space, and includes the largest pillarless ballrooms in the world. It also features a 100,000 sq ft (9,300 m^{2}) plaza.

== History ==
Caesars Forum is located east of the Las Vegas Strip. It was built on 28 acres (11 ha) located behind The Linq resort, on property which previously served as a parking lot. Caesars Entertainment began developing the project around early 2017, and announced it at the end of the year.

The project would provide much-needed convention space for three of Caesars' nearby resort properties: Harrah's, The Linq, and the Flamingo. It would also fulfill the need for more space in Las Vegas, as conventions continued to increase in popularity there. By the time construction started, the facility had already booked $70 million worth of future convention business.

=== Construction ===
Caesars Forum was built by Penta Building Group. KGA Architecture was the interior designer, while The Friedmutter Group served as the architect. Groundbreaking took place on July 16, 2018. Because of a delay related to permitting, the project's construction schedule was reduced by three months. Construction mostly occurred on a continuous schedule. At the peak of construction, the project had 600 workers.

The property was sloped, and Penta took advantage of this by adding an underground parking garage on the east side. The area had long been known for flood problems, and Caesars had to get various approvals to correct the issue. Dirt from the eastside excavation was used to raise the property's southwest corner by about seven feet, helping to prevent flooding. Piling was not necessary, due to the presence of hard caliche in the ground. Concrete pours took place in the middle of the night, during the coolest temperatures of the day.

SME Steel manufactured 10 trusses for the facility at a shop in West Jordan, Utah. Each truss was 315 feet long and weighed approximately 275 tons. Each one was cut into 10 pieces and hauled to Las Vegas, where the trusses were then put back together using nearly 2,000 bolts each. An early plan was to weld the trusses back together, but this was scrapped in favor of bolts, which would expedite construction. Crews began placing the trusses into place in January 2019. Two cranes were used in the lifts, and a third was used for stability. Crews expected to complete one lift each week. The building was topped off on June 13, 2019.

=== Opening and events ===
A five-week promotional tour was launched in February 2020, with 14 scheduled stops in cities across the U.S. The $375 million Caesars Forum was scheduled to open on March 18, 2020, although the opening was delayed one day prior, as a result of the COVID-19 pandemic. The facility had been chosen as one of the locations for the 2020 NFL draft, scheduled for April. However, the event was canceled, also due to the pandemic. The facility sat largely unused for most of the year, because of COVID-19 restrictions in Nevada.

Caesars Forum eventually hosted its first conference on October 25, 2020. The 2022 NFL draft took place at the same locations originally planned for 2020, including Caesars Forum. Public draft festivities were held at the outdoor area of Caesars Forum, while the convention facilities were used as headquarters for media outlets covering the event. In 2023, the venue began hosting BravoCon, a convention held by the television network Bravo for fans of its programming, such as the Real Housewives franchise.

== Features ==
Caesars Forum can hold up to 10,000 people. It has 550,000 sq ft (51,000 m^{2}) of space, including two 110,000 sq ft (10,000 m^{2}) ballrooms and two 40,000 sq ft (3,700 m^{2}) junior ballrooms. The two larger ballrooms do not contain pillars, allowing for unobstructed views. They are the largest pillarless ballrooms in the world. The four ballrooms can be divided a number of different ways with the use of airwalls. The facility has 2,500 airwalls, equivalent to 2.1 miles' worth. It also has six boardrooms, four of which provide access to a 100,000 sq ft (9,300 m^{2}) plaza. The exterior space extends to the foot of the High Roller Ferris wheel and leads to The Linq Promenade, both of which are also operated by Caesars. The east half of the facility includes an underground space with one floor of parking and storage areas. The building is Gold-certified in the Leadership in Energy and Environmental Design program.
