= Gia Giudice =

American TV personality (born 2001)

- Born: January 8, 2001 (age 25); Montville, New Jersey, U.S.
- Education: Rutgers University (BA)
- Occupations: Television personality; podcaster
- Years active: 2009–present
- Known for: The Real Housewives of New Jersey; Next Gen NYC; Special Forces: World's Toughest Test
- Partner: Christian Carmichael (2020–present)
- Parents: Teresa Giudice (mother); Joe Giudice (father)
- Relatives: Melissa Gorga (aunt); Kathy Wakile (cousin once removed)

Gia Giudice (born January 8, 2001) is an American reality television personality and podcaster. The eldest daughter of television personality Teresa Giudice, she is best known for her appearances on Bravo's The Real Housewives of New Jersey and Next Gen NYC, as well as Fox's competition series Special Forces: World's Toughest Test.

== Early life and education ==
Gia Giudice was born to Teresa Giudice and Joe Giudice on January 8, 2001. She has three sisters: Gabriella, Milania, and Audriana.

In 2014, both of Giudice's parents pled guilty to several counts of bankruptcy fraud, conspiracy to commit mail fraud/wire fraud as well as failure to file taxes. Her mother was sentenced to 11 months and returned home in 2015. Her father served 41 months, and upon his release from prison in 2019, he was deported to Italy later that year. Her parents divorced in 2020 after 20 years of marriage.

Her mother married Luis "Louie" Ruelas in 2022. Giudice lived with her parents and siblings until 2025, when she moved to an apartment in Jersey City.

Giudice graduated from Rutgers University in May 2023 with a degree in criminal justice. She was a member of the Zeta Tau Alpha sorority. Although Giudice has announced her intention to become a lawyer, she revealed in 2024 that she was pausing her law school pursuit while she pursues other opportunities.

== Career ==
At the age of eight, Giudice began her career appearing on The Real Housewives of New Jersey, which her mother appeared as a main cast member. Several years later in 2021, the lyrics, "waking up in the morning, thinking about so many things" went viral as an audio sample on TikTok.

In April 2025, Giudice was announced to be joining a new Bravo reality series Next Gen NYC. In October 2025, the series was renewed for a second season; Giudice was confirmed to return with the rest of the cast.

In August 2025, Giudice joined the cast of Fox competition series Special Forces: World's Toughest Test alongside her mother Teresa. Teresa quit the show during the second episode after being unable to watch Giudice box with fellow contestant Christie Pearce Rampone. Giudice later jointly won the season with Shawn Johnson East.

In 2025, Giudice launched a podcast, "Casual Chaos". In December of that year, Giudice signed with Creative Arts Agency for representation.

== Personal life ==
Despite longstanding feuds between her mother and other members of her family, Giudice has a close relationship with her extended family, including uncle Joe Gorga and aunt Melissa Gorga.

Giudice has been in a relationship with Christian Carmichael since 2020. Their relationship was featured on the first season of Next Gen NYC.

In 2025, Giudice drew criticism after she publicly requested a pardon for her father, Joe Giudice, from President Donald Trump. Giudice apologized for posting the request on the Fourth of July and indicated she had been inspired by the recent pardon of Todd Chrisley and Julie Chrisley.

== Filmography ==
Year	Title	Notes
2025	Special Forces: World's Toughest Test	Main cast; 9 episodes
2025	BravoCon Live with Andy Cohen	
2025	Sherri	
2025	Entertainment Tonight	1 episode
2025–present	Next Gen NYC	Main cast; 22 episodes
2021 – 2025	Watch What Happens Live with Andy Cohen	6 episodes
2012	The Apprentice	1 episode
2009 – 2024	The Real Housewives of New Jersey	136 episodes
