= Kroy Biermann =

American football player and reality television star

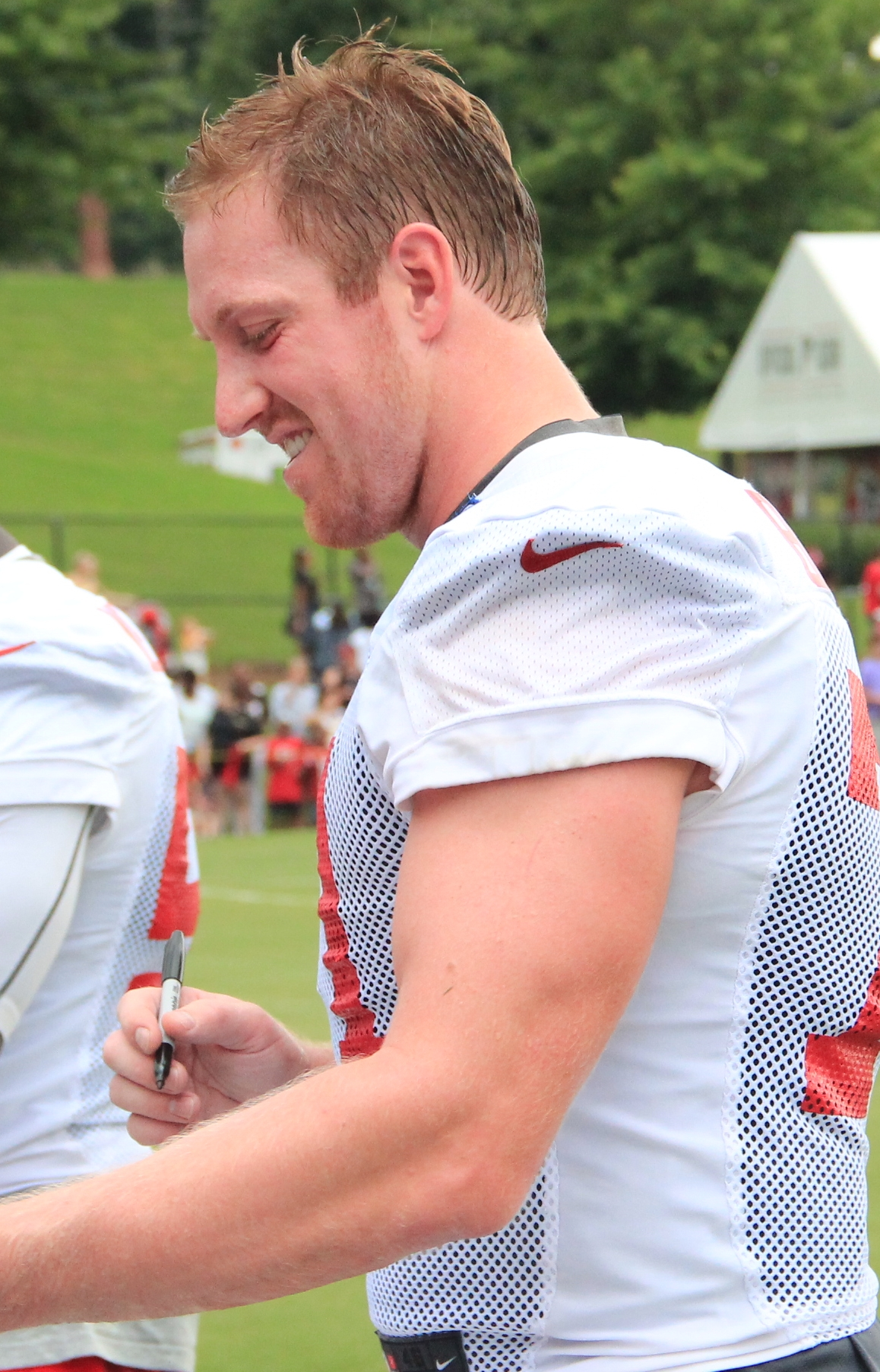
- Biermann with the Atlanta Falcons in 2013

No. 71, 43
- Position: Linebacker

Personal information
- Born: September 12, 1985 (age 41); Hardin, Montana, U.S.
- Listed height: 6 ft 3 in (1.91 m)
- Listed weight: 255 lb (116 kg)

Career information
- High school: Hardin
- College: Montana
- NFL draft: 2008: 5th round, 154th overall pick

Career history
- Atlanta Falcons (2008–2015); Buffalo Bills (2016)*
- * Offseason or practice squad member only

Awards and highlights
- Buck Buchanan Award (2007); Big Sky Defensive MVP (2007); 2× Little All-American (2006, 2007); 2× First-team All-Big Sky (2006, 2007)

Career NFL statistics
- Total tackles: 331
- Sacks: 23.5
- Forced fumbles: 3
- Fumble recoveries: 2
- Interceptions: 2
- Defensive touchdowns: 3
- Stats at Pro Football Reference

Kroy Evan Biermann (born September 12, 1985) is an American former professional football player who was a linebacker for the Atlanta Falcons of the National Football League (NFL). He played college football for the Montana Grizzlies and was selected by the Falcons in the fifth round of the 2008 NFL draft.

== Early life ==
Biermann was born in Hardin, Montana, the son of Keith and Kathy Biermann. He has two older sisters, Krista and Kelsey. His parents and immediate family all have names that start with the letter "K." Wanting to keep the tradition going and unhappy with standard names beginning with "K", Biermann's mother searched a phone book for a suitable "K" name and chose Kroy.

Biermann earned eight letters at Hardin High School: three in football; three in wrestling; and two in track. He was a First-team All-State pick and team captain as a junior and senior at linebacker. He was chosen First-team All-Conference at running back in 2002 and 2003. He participated in Montana's Annual East-West Shrine Game. Biermann was also one of the state's premier wrestlers at the A level and placed second in the state as a junior and senior. His senior year in wrestling he was team captain, had the most take-downs and most pins, and was voted his team's Most Valuable Wrestler.

== College career ==
Biermann played in 52 career games while totaling 220 tackles, 32 sacks (second-most in school history), 45 tackles for loss, nine forced fumbles, and seven fumble recoveries for the University of Montana Grizzlies (GRIZ). In 2004, as a true freshman, Biermann played in 14 of 15 games and had seven tackles for a loss.

During the 2005 season, he played in all 12 games and was the team's fifth-leading tackler and was third on the team with seven sacks and tied for a team-high two fumble recoveries. In 2006, he made 78 stops and contributed with 11 sacks and 13.5 tackles for loss in 14 games. Named a Walter Camp First-team Small College All-American, he was voted a Second-team Little All-America selection by both the Associated Press and The Sports Network. He also earned First-team All-Big Sky Conference.

Biermann was named the 2007 Big Sky Conference Defensive MVP after accumulating 70 tackles, 15 sacks, 18 tackles for a loss, and five forced fumbles during his senior season. Biermann became Montana's first-ever recipient of the Buck Buchanan Award in 2007, as well, given annually by The Sports Network to the top defensive player in Division I Football Championship Subdivision. He played outside linebacker in the 2008 Hula Bowl.

== Professional career ==
=== Pre-draft ===
Biermann was a top performer in the vertical jump and in the 3-cone drill at the 2008 NFL Combine.

Pre-draft measurables
Height	Weight	Arm length	Hand span	40-yard dash	10-yard split	20-yard split	20-yard shuttle	Three-cone drill	Vertical jump	Broad jump	Bench press
6 ft 2 7/8 in (1.90 m)	246 lb (112 kg)	32 3/4 in (0.83 m)	9 1/4 in (0.23 m)	4.75 s	1.64 s	2.76 s	4.30 s	6.83 s	35.0 in (0.89 m)	9 ft 9 in (2.97 m)	29 reps
All values from NFL Combine/Montana's Pro Day.

=== Atlanta Falcons ===
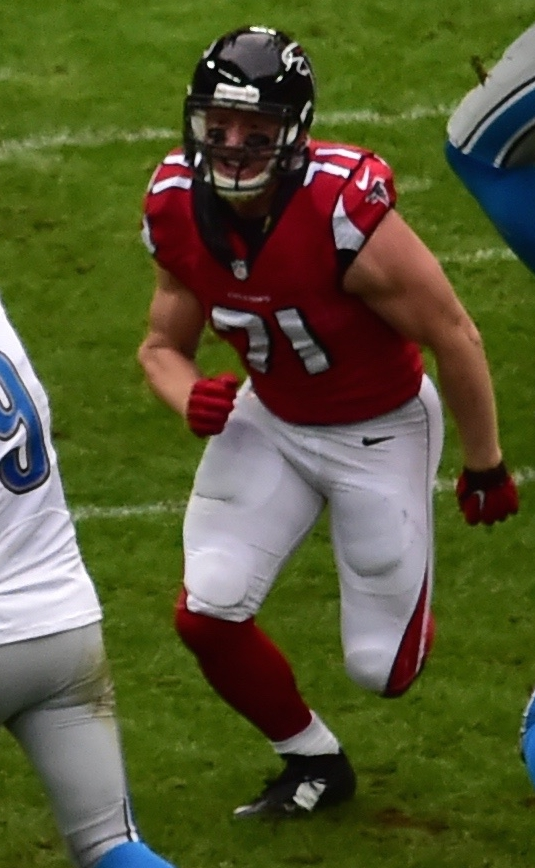
Biermann in 2014

Biermann was selected by the Atlanta Falcons in the fifth round of the 2008 NFL draft (154th overall). He signed a four-year contract worth $1,879,750. Biermann posted his first career sack in a Week 13 match-up against the San Diego Chargers after tackling Chargers QB Philip Rivers and added a second in the season finale against the St. Louis Rams. He also contributed 21 tackles in 2008.

Biermann started off the 2009 season fast for the Falcons as he sacked Dolphins' QB Chad Pennington twice, forced a fumble and forced a holding call in the season opener. He also got a sack vs San Francisco in the Falcon's week 5 matchup. He now has a career-high 3 sacks and one 2 sack game (career high). He took the starting left defensive end spot from 2007 first round pick Jamaal Anderson after his performance vs San Francisco.

Biermann scored his first NFL touchdown on November 2, 2009 in a Monday night game at the New Orleans Saints. He returned a Drew Brees fumble five yards for the score. On December 27, 2009, Biermann stepped in as the team's placekicker after an injury to the punter Michael Koenen during a game against the Buffalo Bills. Biermann, who had not kicked since high school, had kickoffs of 67, 58 and 54 yards. On October 10, 2010, he made headlines as he tipped a Jake Delhomme pass to himself for an interception and returned it 41 yards for a touchdown.

In 2012, he signed a three-year, $9,150,000 contract with the Falcons. On September 15, 2013, he suffered a torn tendon and missed the rest of the 2013 regular season.

On March 20, 2015, the Atlanta Falcons offered Biermann a new contract after spending a week on the free agent list and after recovering from Achilles tendon surgery and leading the Falcons defense with 4.5 sacks during the 2014 season. He signed a one-year, $1,925,000 contract, including a $500,000 signing bonus and $500,000 guaranteed. He finished the 2015 season with 55 tackles, 2.5 sacks, and one forced fumble.

=== Buffalo Bills ===
Biermann signed a one-year, $885,000 contract with the Buffalo Bills on August 15, 2016. On September 2, the Bills released Biermann as a part of final roster cuts.

== NFL career statistics ==
Legend
	Led the league
**Bold**	Career high

=== Regular season ===
Year	Team	Games		Tackles					Interceptions					Fumbles			
Year	Team	GP	GS	Cmb	Solo	Ast	Sck	TFL	Int	Yds	TD	Lng	PD	FF	FR	Yds	TD
2008	ATL	**16**	0	21	18	3	2.0	5	0	0	0	0	0	0	0	0	0
2009	ATL	**16**	2	49	38	11	**5.0**	**8**	0	0	0	0	0	**1**	**2**	**4**	**1**
2010	ATL	**16**	14	36	30	6	3.0	5	**1**	31	**1**	31	**2**	0	0	0	0
2011	ATL	**16**	1	37	15	22	2.5	3	**1**	**50**	**1**	**50**	1	0	0	0	0
2012	ATL	**16**	3	52	37	15	4.0	5	0	0	0	0	0	0	0	0	0
2013	ATL	2	2	7	5	2	0.0	1	0	0	0	0	0	0	0	0	0
2014	ATL	**16**	**15**	**75**	**41**	**34**	4.5	**8**	0	0	0	0	**2**	**1**	0	0	0
2015	ATL	**16**	0	54	32	22	2.5	2	0	0	0	0	0	**1**	0	0	0
		114	37	331	216	115	23.5	37	2	81	2	50	5	3	2	4	1

=== Playoffs ===
Year	Team	Games		Tackles					Interceptions					Fumbles			
Year	Team	GP	GS	Cmb	Solo	Ast	Sck	TFL	Int	Yds	TD	Lng	PD	FF	FR	Yds	TD
2008	ATL	1	0	1	0	1	0.0	0	0	0	0	0	**1**	0	0	0	0
2010	ATL	1	**1**	**5**	2	**3**	**0.5**	**1**	0	0	0	0	0	0	0	0	0
2011	ATL	1	0	4	1	**3**	0.0	0	0	0	0	0	0	0	0	0	0
2012	ATL	**2**	0	3	**3**	0	0.0	0	0	0	0	0	0	0	0	0	0
		5	1	13	6	7	0.5	1	0	0	0	0	1	0	0	0	0

== Personal life ==
In May 2010, Biermann participated in a Dancing Stars Of Atlanta charity event to raise money for Alzheimer's disease at which event he met Kim Zolciak. Their meeting was later shown on the third season of The Real Housewives of Atlanta. The couple starred on two seasons of Housewives and eight seasons of their own spin-off, Don't Be Tardy. Their son, Kroy Jagger "KJ", was born in May 2011. The couple wed at their Roswell, Georgia home on November 11, 2011. Zolciak became pregnant again and another son was born. Subsequently they had twins. In March 2013, Biermann filed to legally adopt Zolciak's daughters, including Ariana, from her previous relationships. When the adoption became final in July 2013, the girls changed their last names to Biermann.

In May 2023, Biermann filed for divorce from Zolciak after eleven years of marriage, citing their date of separation as April 30. In July 2023, both Biermann and Zolciak announced they had terminated their separation and are going to work on their marriage. One month later, in August, Biermann filed for divorce from Zolciak for the second time.

On September 3, 2026, 15-year-old KJ was indicted on seven felony charges including one count of aggravated child molestation, aggravated sexual battery, aggravated sodomy, false imprisonment, and three counts of aggravated sexual battery against a child under 16. The charges relate to an alleged sexual assault on a classmate from April of 2026 in an Alpharetta gym. On September 11, 2026, he was granted a $200,000 bond that included house arrest, wearing a GPS ankle monitor, surrendering his passport to his attorney, completing his schooling virtually, prohibition from using cell phones or posting on social media, and being barred from having any contact with the alleged victim. His attorney previously filed a motion to move the case to juvenile court. Prior to the latest charges, KJ had been placed under court supervision in October of 2025 for allegedly filming himself sexually assaulting an underaged relative.
