= Dylan Geick =

American wrestler, writer, and internet personality (born 1997)

Dylan S. Geick
- Born: September 9, 1998 (age 27); Buffalo Grove, Illinois, US
- Education: Adlai E. Stevenson High School; Columbia University (no degree)
- Occupations: Social media personality; Writer

YouTube information
- Channel: Dylan Geick
- Years active: 2017–present
- Subscribers: 188,000
- Views: 35,000
- Last updated: 4 August 2026

Dylan Steven Geick (born September 9, 1998) is an American social media personality, writer, and amateur wrestler. He speaks on his experience as an LGBTQ person in athletics and the army. Geick wrestled for the Columbia Lions from 2017 to 2018. Geick served in the United States Army for a brief period of just over one year, before leaving.

== Life and career ==
Geick was born on September 9, 1998, in Buffalo Grove, Illinois. At Stevenson High School, Geick was a three-time member of the Illinois Freestyle national team and came in 4th in 152 lb and 160 lb weight divisions at the Illinois High School Sports Association state Championships 2 years in a row. In 2017, Geick self-published Early Works: A Collection of Poetry. He is a YouTuber and speaks on his experience as an out LGBT athlete and Internet celebrity. For a time Geick was involved in a relationship with fellow YouTuber and internet celebrity Jackson Krecioch. In 2019, Geick helped advise the National Collegiate Athletic Association on its compensation policy.

After his 2017 graduation from Stevenson, Geick went to Columbia University. Shortly after committing to attend, a series of homophobic, sexist, and racist comments surfaced in the wrestling team's GroupMe. The coach, Zach Tanelli, reached out to Geick to condemn the comments. Geick joined the Columbia Lions wrestling team and studied English. In late 2019, Geick went on leave from the school and enlisted in the United States Army. In a March 2021 interview, Geick shared that he was discharging from the military in a few weeks.

As of March 2021, Geick had 678,000 followers on Instagram, over 200,000 YouTube subscribers, and 50,000 followers on TikTok.

== Personal life ==
In 2016, Geick began posting pictures of himself with his boyfriend on Instagram and then came out as gay to some schoolmates. He came out to wider audiences in 2017 in an article in Stevenson's school newspaper and a profile in Outsports. From 2017 to 2019, he was in an on-again, off-again relationship with YouTuber Jackson Krecioch.

In April 2023, Dylan confirmed in a YouTube video that he now and for some time has recognized his sexuality as queer.
