= Ariana Biermann =

American TV personality (born 2001)

- Born: Ariana Lenee Zolciak; October 17, 2001 (age 25); Atlanta, Georgia, U.S.
- Education: Georgia State University
- Occupations: TV personality; fashion; entrepreneur; influencer
- Years active: 2008–present
- Known for: The Real Housewives of Atlanta; Don't Be Tardy...; Next Gen NYC
- Parents: Kim Zolciak (mother); Daniel Toce (father); Kroy Biermann (adoptive father)

Ariana Lenee Biermann (née Zolciak; born October 17, 2001) is an American TV personality, fashion entrepreneur and influencer. She is best known for her appearances on the Bravo reality television programs The Real Housewives of Atlanta, Don't Be Tardy..., and Next Gen NYC.

== Early life and education ==
Biermann was born in Atlanta, Georgia to Kim Zolciak and Daniel Toce on October 17, 2001. Her parents divorced in 2003. In 2013, she was legally adopted by her then-stepfather, former NFL player Kroy Biermann. She has five half-siblings: Brielle Karenna, Kroy Jagger "KJ", Kash Kade, Kaia Rose and Kane Ren.

Biermann grew up on camera, appearing in many of the early episodes of The Real Housewives of Atlanta with her mother Kim as well as the spin-off series centered on the Biermann family, Don't Be Tardy.

Biermann attended Georgia State University. In 2024, she graduated with her bachelor's degree in business administration and management.

== Career ==
=== Television ===
Biermann appeared as a child on The Real Housewives of Atlanta alongside her mother, Kim Zolciak. Her friendship with Riley Burruss was featured prominently on the show until a public dispute arose between Kim and Riley's mother, Kandi Burruss, over the rights to the song "Tardy for the Party." After the disagreement between their mothers, Biermann and Riley became estranged for the duration of Kim's time on the show.

Following her appearances on The Real Housewives of Atlanta, Biermann continued to be featured on Bravo through her family's spin-off series Don't Be Tardy, which premiered in 2012. The series focused on the Biermann family and their friendships, experiences, and lives. Biermann was a main cast member on the series for its entire run until the show was cancelled in 2020.

In November 2022, Magilla Entertainment announced that it was developing a series under the working title Cut Off, which was to follow Biermann and her sister Brielle as they become financially independent from their family. The series was pitched as documenting their move toward self-sufficiency in Los Angeles, but the project was never picked up by a network.

In April 2025, Bravo announced that Biermann would be starring in the new reality series Next Gen NYC, which follows young adults, including several children of Bravo stars, as they navigate careers, relationships, and independence in New York City. Biermann was cast along with her then-boyfriend Hudson McLeroy and was reunited with her former childhood best friend Riley Burruss. In October 2025, the series was renewed for a second season.

Biermann was prominently featured in Bravo's marketing campaign for BravoCon 2025 and participated in two panels: "I Got It From My Momma" with her mother, Kim Zolciak; and "Thank U, Next Gen" with her costars on Next Gen NYC.

=== Fashion ===
Beyond television, Biermann has cultivated a presence as a fashion, beauty, and lifestyle influencer. On Next Gen NYC, she revealed that she earns income through social media endorsements, including brand-sponsored posts that earn her $1,000 per post. In 2019, Biermann co-founded KAB Cosmetics with her mother and sister, Brielle. Biermann appeared with her mother and sister on the shopping network HSN to promote the line. She also appeared in 2020 modeling pieces for her mother's swimwear brand, Salty K.

After moving to New York City, Biermann and her then-boyfriend Hudson McLeroy documented the early design process for their new company, Adored Angels, on Next Gen NYC. However, in 2025 she announced that the project was on pause for quality reasons.

== Personal life ==
Biermann has been open about her experiences with cosmetic procedures. As a teenager, she received lip filler, which she later had dissolved twice. Her mother, Kim Zolciak, stated that Biermann was not permitted to receive plastic surgery until she was 18 and generally did not support her daughters receiving plastic surgery; however, Kim admitted that she did not consider injectables or fillers to fall under the category of plastic surgery and supports these types of procedures for her daughters. Biermann revealed in 2025 that when she was 14 years old, her mother arranged for her freckles to be removed via laser treatment without Biermann's consent.

Biermann has also spoken candidly about her body image issues during her teenage years. Biermann faced bullying at school due to her television appearances. While on television, Biermann's family spent thousands of dollars per day on hair and makeup costs. At age 16, while putting on a prom dress during an episode of Don't Be Tardy, Biermann became self-conscious and broke down, prompting an emotional conversation between her and her mother about Kim's history of cosmetic procedures. In 2021, Biermann announced that she had lost 50 pounds as part of a weight loss journey influenced by comments she received from peers and the public. Biermann has publicly denied claims of an eating disorder following her signficiant weight loss.

In 2018, Biermann began an on-and-off relationship with Hudson McLeroy while they were in high school. In 2022, both were arrested in connection with an alleged driving under the influence incident while together. Biermann and McLeroy moved to New York City in July 2024, and their relationship, along with their first year in the city together, was documented on the first season of Next Gen NYC. In October 2025, Biermann announced that she and McLeroy had ended their relationship.

Biermann has a complicated but close relationship with her parents. Following the public and protracted divorce between her mother, Kim, and her adoptive father, Kroy, Biermann has maintained a close relationship with Kroy. She has also discussed her financial involvement in the family, stating that she helps pay household bills and supports her siblings. Biermann alleged that her parents spent her past earnings from childhood without her knowledge. Her mother, Kim, admitted to these allegations, stating that the money she borrowed was for household bills and that Biermann would be paid back.

== Legal issues ==
On August 13 2022, Biermann was arrested in Forsyth County, Georgia, following a minor car accident that took place at approximately 1 a.m. while she was driving her Mercedes G-Wagon. The arresting officers alleged signs of impairment during a field sobriety test, and a vape pen containing THC was reportedly found in Biermann's possession. Biermann refused a preliminary breath test and was charged with three misdemeanors: driving under the influence of alcohol, improper/erratic lane change, and underage alcohol possession or purchase. Biermann admitted to using a THC pen the night before but denied being impaired.

Biermann's mother Kim posted a statement in support of Biermann after the arrest was made public, denying that Biermann was impaired and instead insisting that she was upset and anxious. Hudson McLeroy, Biermann's then-boyfriend who was with her at the time, was also arrested; his charges included alleged DUI, furnishing alcohol to a minor, and violation of permit-driving conditions. Biermann was released on a $5,120 bond. Biermann's mugshot photo was used to decorate her 21st birthday cake.

In May 2025, Biermann entered a plea deal in which she pleaded guilty to reckless driving and possession/use of drug-related objects; in exchange, the original DUI and underage possession charges were dropped. She was sentenced to 24 months of probation and ordered to pay over $2,000 in fines, complete 40 hours of community service, and refrain from alcohol or drug use.

== Filmography ==
Year	Title	Notes
2025	BravoCon Live with Andy Cohen	
2025	Watch What Happens Live with Andy Cohen	
2025 – present	Next Gen NYC	Main cast; 22 episodes
2019	House of Kim with Kim Zolciak	Podcast series; 2 episodes
2012 – 2020	Don't Be Tardy	Main cast; 95 episodes
2008 – 2012	The Real Housewives of Atlanta	41 episodes
