= Riley Burruss =

American TV personality, musician and entrepreneur (born 2002)

- Born: Riley Joyce Burruss; August 22, 2002 (age 24); Atlanta, Georgia, U.S.
- Education: New York University
- Occupation: Television personality
- Years active: 2009–present
- Known for: The Real Housewives of Atlanta; Next Gen NYC
- Parents: Kandi Burruss (mother); Block Spencer (father)
- Relatives: Todd Tucker (ex-stepfather); Kaela Tucker (ex-stepsister); Ace Tucker (half-brother); Blaze Tucker (half-sister)

Riley Joyce Burruss (born August 22, 2002) is an American television personality. She is best known for her appearances on the Bravo reality television programs The Real Housewives of Atlanta and Next Gen NYC. Burruss is the eldest daughter of singer and television personality Kandi Burruss.

== Early life ==
Riley Joyce Burruss was born in August 2002, to Kandi Burruss and Russell "Block" Spencer. Her father was largely absent during Burruss' upbringing, however, the two reconciled once Burruss became an adult. In 2014, her mother married Todd Tucker. She has a step sister, Kaela, and two half siblings, Ace and Blaze. In November 2025, Burruss' mother and stepfather announced their divorce.

Burruss graduated from New York University in 2024 with a bachelor's degree in music business. Burruss was a first generation college student. Burruss has long aspired to become an attorney. In 2025, Burruss announced that she was studying for the LSAT.

== Career ==
Burruss first appeared on The Real Housewives of Atlanta with her mother, Kandi, during the show's second season when she was seven years old. Burruss released her first single, titled "Better Late Than Never," in February 2017. The song, inspired by her complicated relationship with her father. Burruss indicated she hopes to become involved in developing and supporting the Atlanta music scene. In 2021, Andy Cohen announced a special on Watch What Happens Live with Andy Cohen called "Real Housekids of Bravo," which featured Burruss with other children of Real Housewives. The special aired on Mother's Day in 2021.

In April 2025, Bravo announced that Burruss would be starring in a new reality series Next Gen NYC, which follows young adults navigating life and friendship in New York City. In October 2025, the series was renewed for a second season. Although Burruss revealed she initially planned to quit the series ahead of the second season because of her plans to pursue higher education, she was announced to return with the rest of the cast.

== Personal life ==
Burruss has described her mother as strict, revealing that she used to have to sign contracts as a child to earn toys, which Burruss stated is a reason she became interested in the law. Her mother supports Burruss financially, including allowing a $14k per month credit card spend limit.

Burruss has been open about facing body image issues stemming from growing up on television. After the negative comments made by fans about her body, Burruss lost over 50 pounds.

== Filmography ==
Year	Title	Notes
2025	BravoCon Live with Andy Cohen	
2025–present	Next Gen NYC	Main cast; 19 episodes
2025	Dish Nation	1 episode
2021 – 2025	Watch What Happens Live with Andy Cohen	6 episodes
2008 – 2023	The Real Housewives of Atlanta	54 episodes
