= The Real Housewives of Atlanta season 1 =

Season of television series

The Real Housewives of Atlanta
- Season 1
- Cover used by the iTunes Store; Left to right: Wu, Snow, Zolciak, Leakes and Whitfield
- Starring: NeNe Leakes; DeShawn Snow; Shereé Whitfield; Lisa Wu-Hartwell; Kim Zolciak
- No. of episodes: 8

Release
- Original network: Bravo
- Original release: October 7 – November 25, 2008

Season chronology
- Next → Season 2

The first season of The Real Housewives of Atlanta, an American reality television series, was broadcast on Bravo. It aired from October 7, 2008, until November 25, 2008, and was primarily filmed in Atlanta, Georgia. Its executive producers are Lauren Eskelin, Lorraine Haughton, Glenda Hersh, Carlos King, and Steven Weinstock.

The Real Housewives of Atlanta focuses on the lives of NeNe Leakes, DeShawn Snow, Shereé Whitfield, Lisa Wu-Hartwell, and Kim Zolciak. During the season, Leakes frequently clashes with Whitfield and Zolciak, while several of the housewives pursue business careers. It consisted of eight episodes, all of which aired on Tuesday evenings; two were aired at 9:00 pm, while six were broadcast at 10:00 pm.

This season marked the only regular appearance of DeShawn Snow.

== Production and crew ==
The Real Housewives of Atlanta was announced as the third installment in The Real Housewives franchise, intending to capitalize on the successes of its predecessors The Real Housewives of Orange County and The Real Housewives of New York City. Its television network Bravo stated that the series' planned storyline focused on "[balancing] motherhood, demanding careers and a fast-paced social calendar". The season premiere "Welcome One, Welcome ATL" was aired on October 7, 2008, while the seventh episode "Best of Enemies" served as the season finale, and was aired on November 18, 2008. It was followed by a one-part reunion special, which marked the conclusion of the season and was broadcast on November 25, 2008. Lauren Eskelin, Lorraine Haughton, Glenda Hersh, Carlos King, and Steven Weinstock are recognized as the series' executive producers; it is produced and distributed by True Entertainment, an American subsidiary of the Italian corporation Endemol.

== Cast and synopsis ==
Five housewives were featured during the first season of The Real Housewives of Atlanta, which Bravo described as "entrepreneurs, doting mothers, and classy Southern women." NeNe Leakes and her husband Gregg live in Sugarloaf with their two sons; she founded The Twisted Hearts Foundation in an effort to reduce domestic violence and expresses an interest in opening an upscale hotel. DeShawn Snow recently moved to Alpharetta with her husband Eric Snow and their three sons and is heavily involved in charitable donations and organizations. Single mother Shereé Whitfield and her three children live in Sandy Springs; she was in the process of launching her fashion collection "She by Shereé". Lisa Wu-Hartwell, her husband Ed Hartwell, and their three children live in an upscale country club community in Duluth; she operates a real estate firm, a jewelry line, and a clothing collection. Single mother Kim Zolciak and her two daughters also live in Duluth; she is in the process of recording a country music album.

== Reception ==
=== U.S. television ratings ===
The premiere episode "Welcome One, Welcome ATL" attracted 656,000 viewers in its initial broadcast on October 7, 2008; in doing so, it became the least-watched episode of the season and in the history of the series. The second episode "It's My Party!" was broadcast to 1.18 million viewers on October 14, 2008, from which point the season maintained a steady viewership exceeding one million individuals through the remainder of its run. The season finale "Best of Enemies" attracted 2.21 viewers in its initial broadcast on November 18, 2008, while the reunion special aired the following week earned the season its peak viewership with an audience of 2.82 million.

== Episodes ==
The Real Housewives of Atlanta season 1 episodes
No. overall	No. in season	Title	Original release date	Prod. code	U.S. viewers (millions)
1	1	"Welcome One, Welcome ATL"	October 7, 2008	101	0.66
DeShawn oversees the construction of her mansion and looks for employees, while Lisa manages household responsibilities and her business endeavors. Shereé coordinates an extravagant birthday party in celebration of her divorce from Bob Whitfield, although she and NeNe are in the midst of an ongoing personal conflict. Kim discusses the lavish lifestyle her unnamed boyfriend "Big Papa" provides for her. This episode marks the first appearance of Nene, Kim, Deshawn, Shereé and Lisa.
2	2	"It's My Party!"	October 14, 2008	102	1.18
NeNe reflects on her fight with Shereé at the birthday party, while Kim plans a birthday party for her daughter Brielle. Lisa is unable to attend after falling ill with the flu, while NeNe and Shereé remain civil at Brielle's party.
3	3	"Who's Your Poppa?"	October 21, 2008	103	1.32
NeNe receives a letter from a relative which implies that another man might be her biological father. DeShawn coordinates a black tie event for her foundation, and is assisted by NeNe. Meanwhile, Kim decides to venture into the country music industry.
4	4	"Bring on the Bling"	October 28, 2008	104	N/A
DeShawn continues planning her black tie event, while Lisa begins planning the launch of her jewelry line after a successful trunk show. Kim, Shereé, and their children join for a daylong outing.
5	5	"Out of Tune"	November 4, 2008	105	1.00
Shereé and Lisa attend a pole-dancing class together. DeShawn celebrates her thirty-fourth birthday with a vineyard outing with Lisa, NeNe, and their husbands, where NeNe spreads rumors about Shereé and speaks poorly of Kim's musical aspirations. Meanwhile, Shereé and Kim become friends in light of their difficulties with NeNe; Kim and NeNe later get into an argument while shopping together. NeNe launches The Twisted Hearts Foundation, while Kim advances her pursuit of a career in the music industry.
6	6	"Dream a Little Nightmare"	November 11, 2008	106	1.49
NeNe moves forward with DNA testing in an attempt to resolve her paternity conflict, while DeShawn arranges a group meal hoping for a reconciliation among the housewives. Shereé coordinates the launch of her fashion line "She by Shereé" and later goes on a boating excursion with Kim at Lake Lanier, while Lisa is reluctant to see her husband Ed returning to his football career after a recovering from a long-term injury.
7	7	"Best of Enemies"	November 18, 2008	107	2.21
Lisa is discouraged after Ed signed a contract with the Oakland Raiders, and tries to gather the housewives after DeShawn's barbecue proves unsuccessful. Shereé recovers from an unsuccessful viewing for "She by Shereé", while DeShawn's husband Eric contemplates an early retirement after sustaining an injury. The housewives and their families gather for a dinner event in hopes of a reconciliation.
8	8	"Reunion Special"	November 25, 2008	108	2.82
Andy Cohen and the housewives discuss the ongoing controversies of the season, including NeNe's strained relationships with Kim and Shereé. This episode marks the final regular appearance of Deshawn.
9	9	"The Lost Footage"	July 23, 2009	N/A	N/A
This special shows the unseen moments from Season 1.
