= The Real Housewives of Atlanta season 2 =

Season of television series

The Real Housewives of Atlanta
- Season 2
- Cover used by the iTunes Store; Left to right: Leakes, Zolciak, Burruss, Whitfield and Wu
- Starring: NeNe Leakes; Shereé Whitfield; Lisa Wu-Hartwell; Kim Zolciak; Kandi Burruss
- No. of episodes: 16

Release
- Original network: Bravo
- Original release: July 30 – November 12, 2009

Season chronology
- ← Previous; Season 1 Next → Season 3

The second season of The Real Housewives of Atlanta, an American reality television series, was broadcast on Bravo. It aired from July 30, 2009 until November 12, 2009, and was primarily filmed in Atlanta, Georgia. Its executive producers are Lauren Eskelin, Lorraine Haughton, Glenda Hersh, Carlos King, Steven Weinstock and Andy Cohen.

The Real Housewives of Atlanta focuses on the lives of NeNe Leakes, Shereé Whitfield, Lisa Wu-Hartwell, Kim Zolciak and Kandi Burruss. It consisted of sixteen episodes.

This season marked the final regular appearance of Lisa Wu.

== Production and crew ==
The season premiered "The Lost Footage" which was aired on October 7, 2008, and centered on unseen footage of the season prior. The season officially began with "New Attitude, Same ATL" on July 30, 2009, while the thirteenth episode "Catwalks & Cat Fights" served as the season finale, and was aired on October 22, 2009. It was followed by a two-part reunion special that aired on October 29, and November 5, 2009 and this season's lost footage episode which marked the conclusion of the season and was broadcast on November 12, 2009. Lauren Eskelin, Lorraine Haughton, Glenda Hersh, Carlos King, and Steven Weinstock are recognized as the series' executive producers; it is produced and distributed by True Entertainment, an American subsidiary of the Italian corporation Endemol.

== Cast and synopsis ==
Shortly after season 1, DeShawn Snow revealed she had been let go from the series and alleged that producers considered her to be "too human for a circus show" and was replaced by former Xscape member Kandi Burruss. Burruss had recently become engaged to her boyfriend A.J. and expressed interest in reviving her music career. During the second season, an attempted reconciliation between Leakes, Whitfield, and Zolciak failed to come to fruition, while a feud developed between Leakes and Burruss after the latter became friends with Zolciak and helped her record her single "Tardy for the Party". Meanwhile, Zolciak attempted to launch her own wig line and became engaged to Big Papa, while Wu-Hartwell and Whitfield launched their own clothing collections.

== Episodes ==
The Real Housewives of Atlanta season 2 episodes
No. overall	No. in season	Title	Original release date	U.S. viewers (millions)
10	1	"New Attitude, Same ATL"	July 30, 2009	2.66
The Atlanta ladies are back in the drama-filled second season premiere. Shereé decides to throw herself an "Independence Party" to celebrate her recent divorce, while Lisa and her husband discuss the idea of having another baby. The ladies attend actress and comedian Niecy Nash's birthday party, where Shereé and NeNe reflect on their tumultuous past. Kim decides she wants to design a line of wigs, and gets the ball rolling by going to cosmetology school. New housewife Kandi contemplates her new life with fiance AJ, while Sheree's party plans start to go awry. Kandi is added to the opening credits replacing departing cast member Deshawn. This episode marks the first appearance of Kandi.
11	2	"Kim-tervention"	August 6, 2009	N/A
NeNe calls Kim to meet up for that long overdue "glass of wine" in an attempt to make amends. Shereé dishes about the recent blow-up she had with a party planner. Meanwhile, Lisa and Ed have their first fertility visit. NeNe approaches Shereé about squashing their problems with Kim, and they set up a meeting to talk it out. Also, Kandi goes to the studio to work on her solo album.
12	3	"Unbeweavable"	August 13, 2009	N/A
Shereé, NeNe and Kim's reconciliation doesn't go as planned. Lisa and Ed meet with a design team to discuss her new clothing line "Closet Freak", and Kim throws a wig party to celebrate her new endeavor. Kandi meets for lunch with TLC member T-Boz to discuss her musical career, and Shereé throws a gathering to celebrate her new home. Also, Dwight throws a circus-themed birthday bash.
13	4	"Mummies, Mommies, and Baby Mommas"	August 20, 2009	2.82
NeNe and Dwight chat during a visit to the salon, while Lisa discusses a trip to L.A. to visit her mom. Kandi meets with her photographer and business team to discuss her image. Fitness guru Shereé attends a bodybuilding event, while Kandi and AJ get their engagement photos taken. When Kim learns that her nanny left her girls home alone without supervision, drama ensues. Then, the ladies attend a King Tut cocktail party with their kids.
14	5	"Home Is Where the Heartbreak Is"	August 27, 2009	2.47
Lisa and NeNe go shopping to prepare for their trip to L.A., and NeNe meets with photographer Derek Blanks to discuss her "Alter Ego" photo shoot. Shereé meets with an event promoter to discuss Mercedes Benz sponsoring her "She by Sheree" fashion show. Meanwhile, Lisa brings NeNe for a visit with her family and a celebration of her grandmother's 92nd birthday. Back on the East Coast, Kim visits Kandi in the recording studio. As they bond, Kim asks Kandi to produce "Tardy for the Party" for Kim and NeNe to record.
15	6	"My Ego Is Bigger Than Your Ego"	September 3, 2009	3.06
Kim lays down the house rules with her new nanny and then finally buries the hatchet with Lisa. Kandi meets with her wedding planner, but her plans for an engagement party are dashed when she finds out that her nephews and AJ's son are in a life threatening car crash. Kandi spills her guts to Sheree and their friendship grows as they realize they have a lot in common. Nene gets all of the ladies in line for their Alter Ego photos and then directs them all in a riveting photo shoot. At the photo shoot, Kim and Sheree talk civilly for the first time and decide to do something nice for Kandi in light of her family tragedy.
16	7	"Throwing Shade"	September 10, 2009	N/A
It's showtime for Lisa. With the debut of her clothing line Closet Freak, she is all business, trying to get everything done in time. Meanwhile, Sheree finds out that her She by Sheree fashion line debut will have to wait, yet again. NeNe gets tough on her college dropout son Brice, and Kandi calls in a favor to flip "Tardy for the Party" into a song for Kim and NeNe to record. Kim gets serious about launching her wig line, and does a little research by throwing a wig party.
17	8	"Scrambled Egos"	September 17, 2009	N/A
Kandi pushes an emotional Kim to face her fears and step back into the Atlanta music scene. Will Kim attempt to record again? Newly single Sheree shapes up with her expensive fitness trainer, who attempts to find her love. Meanwhile, all of the ladies get glammed up for a black tie event to reveal their edgy Alter Ego photos, but the night takes a dramatic turn when Kim has a serious accident and steals the spotlight from everyone.
18	9	"Precious Pocketbook"	September 24, 2009	N/A
Kim tells her girlfriend Cori that Big Papa is back in the picture after he whisked her away to the Bahamas. Lisa and Kandi appear in the charity performance of "Pocketbook Monologues", where Kandi's emotional performance wins over the crowd – and Dwight. Meanwhile, NeNe meets with the co-writer of her forthcoming memoir, and Shereé finally throws her long awaited Independence Party, where NeNe confronts Kim and Kandi about recording "Tardy for the Party" without her.
19	10	"Better Tardy Than Never"	October 1, 2009	N/A
Fresh off her fight with Kandi and Kim, NeNe distances herself even further from the ladies. Kim and Kandi team up to finish the recording of "Tardy for the Party" in time for their joint birthday party where Big Papa has a BIG surprise for Kim. Shereé leaves Dwight in charge of her fashion show as she and Tania head to New York to check out her "She by Shereé" samples. Ed tells Lisa that he's interested in working in broadcast if he doesn't go back to the NFL. Kandi performs solo for the first time in a long time.
20	11	"High Heels & Record Deals"	October 8, 2009	2.56
NeNe organizes an over-the-top high heel marathon for her Twisted Hearts Foundation. Lisa and Ed make a tough decision about his NFL career, and Lisa takes a pregnancy test. Despite her engagement with Big Papa, Kim moves forward with starting her wig business. Kandi confronts Kim about not attending her show, and then flies to LA for an important meeting at Capitol Records about a possible record deal. Shereé shoots a promo video for her upcoming fashion show, but Dwight is so not into it. NeNe meets with her uncle and must decide if she’s finally ready to meet the man who claims to be her biological father face-to-face.
21	12	"Baby Momma & Daddy Drama"	October 15, 2009	2.63
Kim and Shereé return to the "scene of the crime" at FAB to make amends and to plan a surprise engagement party for Kandi and AJ. Meanwhile, Kandi, AJ and Kandi's mom visit a marriage counselor to help ease the tension. Shereé's finished samples for her She by Sheree line finally arrive, and she unveils them to Dwight for the first time. NeNe and her Uncle Mel travel back to her roots in Athens to give her book writer a glimpse into her life growing up. While in Athens, NeNe finds herself face-to-face with the man who claims to be her biological father.
22	13	"Catwalks & Cat Fights"	October 22, 2009	2.97
With "She by Shereé" is about to debut, but big changes are on the horizon and serious trouble is brewing between the ladies. As Lisa prepares for a new future without Ed's NFL paycheck, Shereé tries to keep it together before her clothes go down the catwalk. Meanwhile, it's NeNe who is ready for a meltdown. After her return from meeting the man who claims to be her father, she butts heads with Gregg, battles with Kandi at Shereé's show, and has a blowout fight with Kim.
23	14	"Reunion Part One"	October 29, 2009	2.80
The first part will delve deep into the ladies' lives and see how they really feel about all the catfights, wig-pulling and all-around drama that happened this season in Hotlanta.
24	15	"Reunion Part Two"	November 5, 2009	2.44
In part 2 of the reunion special the ladies discuss future of NeNe and Kim's friendship, if Sheree and Kim can bury the hatchet and if Lisa and Ed will have any more kids. This episode marks the final regular appearance of Lisa.
25	16	"The Lost Footage"	November 12, 2009	N/A
Andy Cohen reveals the lost footage from the second season.
