= I Am Real =

Album by Simon Van Kempen

Single by Simon van Kempen
- Released: 21 April 2011
- Recorded: 31 March 2011
- Studio: JSM Music (New York City)
- Genre: Dance-pop; EDM
- Length: 3:12
- Label: JSM Music
- Songwriters: Allison Beth Simon; Jon Jason Appleton; Koki Saito
- Producers: Joel Simon; Ross Hopman; Koki Saito

Audio video
- "I Am Real" on YouTube

"I Am Real" is the debut single by Australian hotelier Simon van Kempen. It was released on 21 April 2011, through JSM Music, during his wife Alex McCord's tenure on the American reality television series The Real Housewives of New York City. The song was written by Allison Beth Simon, Jon Jason Appleton, and Koki Saito, while production was handled by Joel Simon, Ross Hopman, and Saito. During its development, van Kempen and McCord met with the team of writers to ensure that the song's lyrics would represent them accurately. A dance-pop and EDM track, "I Am Real" contains tongue-in-cheek lyrics that address van Kempen's critics. One lyric references a comment McCord used to describe fellow cast member Luann de Lesseps.

"I Am Real" received mostly unfavourable reviews from music critics, who dismissed van Kempen as a television personality who tried launching a singing career. It also received comparisons to "Money Can't Buy You Class" (2010) by de Lesseps. The song was unsuccessful, selling just 1,000 copies in the United States, as of September 2011. van Kempen has since performed "I Am Real" on Watch What Happens Live with Andy Cohen and at Manhattan's annual "Fashion Night Out" event in 2011.

== Background and release ==
"I Am Real" is the first and only song recorded by Simon van Kempen, an Australian hotelier and husband of American television personality Alex McCord, of Bravo's The Real Housewives of New York City. Regarding its unexpected release, van Kempen explained that he had grown up with a musical background, and spent time in his youth performing as a musician. He did not write the song, but still wanted it to reflect his thoughts and feelings. It was written by Allison Beth Simon, Jon Jason Appleton, and Koki Saito, while production was handled by Joel Simon, Ross Hopman, and Saito. According to McCord, the two sat down with Joel Simon to discuss the song's lyrics and ensure that it would represent them accurately; the writers would draft lyrics and then return to McCord and van Kempen to seek approval. van Kempen explained that he would not have recorded the song if it were not for The Real Housewives of New York City, for which McCord was a cast member, and his resulting notoriety. He recorded the song on 31 March 2011, at JSM Music Studios in New York City. van Kempen and McCord refrained from discussing details of the song until its release date, in order to drop it as a surprise for fans.

The song was released for digital download and streaming in various countries on 21 April 2011, through JSM Music. van Kempen and the label worked with the independent music distributor CD Baby to launch the release. JSM Music typically creates music for advertisements and commercials. A remix of the song, called the Thug in a Club mix, was released separately in the same formats on 12 May 2011.

== Composition and lyrics ==
"I Am Real" is a dance-pop and EDM song with tongue-in-cheek and playful lyrics. Self-described as a "cheeky" and "self-deprecating" song influenced by the music of the 1980s, van Kempen said that it "takes the piss out of reality TV". Rich Juzwiak from TV Guide Magazine labelled it as a "thumping wanabe [sic] club anthem," calling it the opposite of "Tardy for the Party" (2009), by The Real Housewives of Atlanta cast member Kim Zolciak. He also expressed that the lack of Auto-Tune was refreshing, despite a critic from Yahoo! Entertainment referring to the song as "Auto-tuned awfulness". Mike Barthel from The Awl said that he sings in a mid-range voice on top of a lower-pitched production, which he felt was something different for a dance and EDM track.

The song discusses van Kempen's "haters", his views on class, and how he handles criticism. It features lyrics such as "Love me or hate me / I don't give a damn!" and "I am real / I ain't going to change". It also discusses what he experienced during the filming of The Real Housewives of New York City, such as his friendships and indifferences with the other cast members: "When wives attack behind my back / They trash me on their Twitter." According to van Kempen, some members accused him of being a gay man, despite his marriage to McCord, and was "get[ting] sick after four years" of the rumours. "I Am Real" also features a "now infamous one-liner" that McCord originally said on the series ("Thug in a cocktail dress"), in reference to fellow housewife Luann de Lesseps.

== Reception and promotion ==
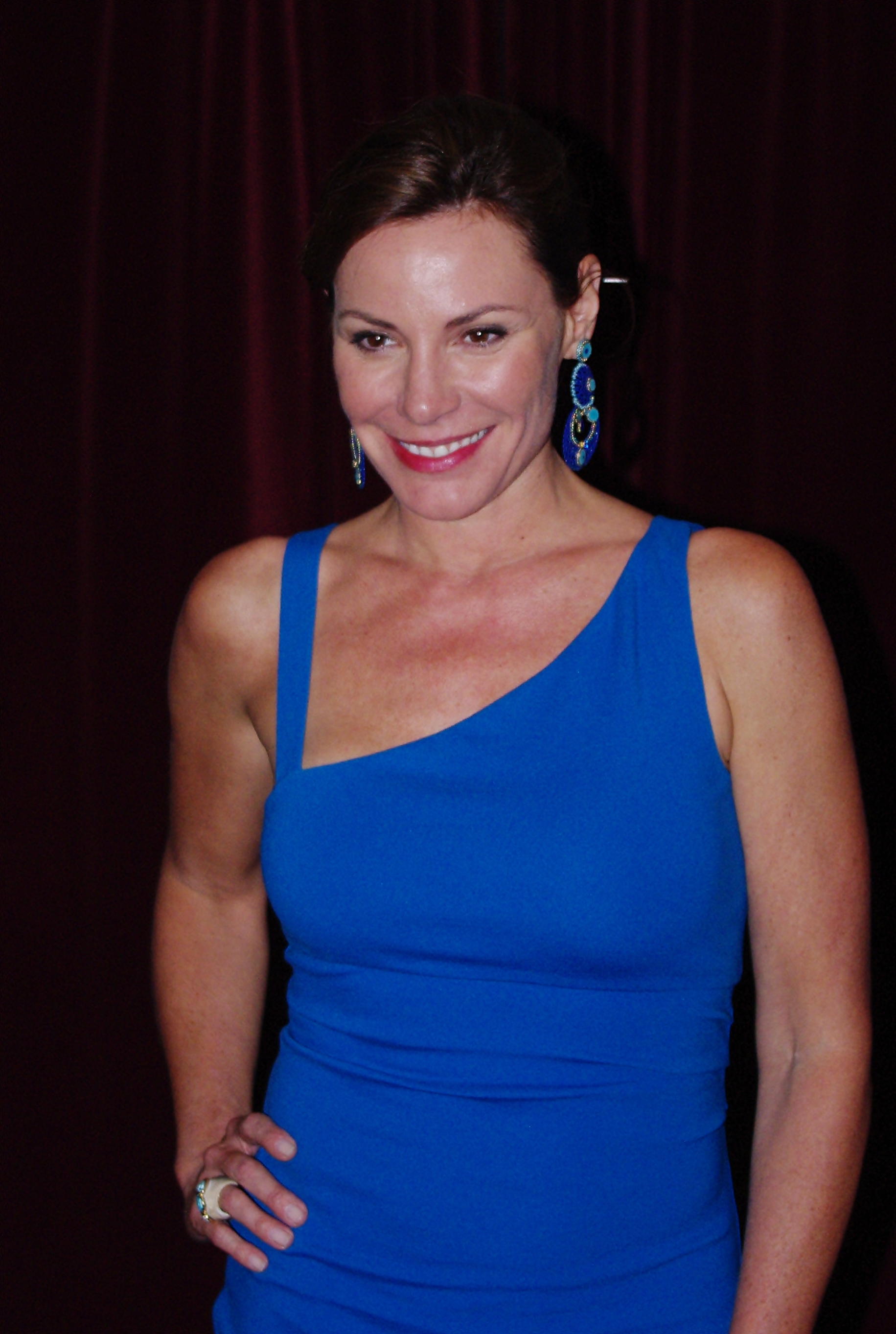
The song received comparisons to "Money Can't Buy You Class", a 2010 single by fellow Housewives cast member Luann de Lesseps (above).

People's Dave Quinn ranked "I Am Real" as the worst song in The Real Housewives franchise, explaining that given van Kempen's multiple appearances on the show, the release of his music "shouldn't have been too much of a shock". Pamela Sitt from MTV News compared the song to Kim Zolciak's 2010 single "Google Me", suggesting that "I Am Real" might be just as bad. A Yahoo! Entertainment critic called it "so bad", preferring de Lesseps' "Money Can't Buy You Class" (2010) and equating their listening of the song to eating "really disgusting food". Amanda Dobbins, of Vulture, provided a lukewarm review: "We can say this much: The song does rhyme, and it does appear to be factually correct (in that Simon is a real person)." Eliot Glazer from MTV News blamed "Money Can't Buy You Class" for allowing van Kempen to believe "that he, too, could – and should – record a song". Also in reference to "Money Can't Buy You Class", several staff members from E! Online described "I Am Real" as "an even more ridiculous song"; they also labelled van Kempen as a television personality who "thinks he has what it takes to be a pop star". Juzwiak referred to it as "yet another musical punch line that, whether it's aware of it or not, underlines how delusional the extreme personalities that populate reality TV are". However, Barthel called it one of the better Real Housewives singles due to it being a "total one-off".

In September 2011, The Hollywood Reporter reported that "I Am Real" was the second lowest-performing The Real Housewives-related single, with approximate sales of just 1,000 digital copies in the United States. McCord premiered a snippet of the song during the episode of Watch What Happens Live with Andy Cohen broadcast on 21 April 2011. van Kempen later appeared on the show to perform "I Am Real" live. Andy Cohen, host of the show, later referenced the clip as "the worst musical performance" by a former series cast member. van Kempen also performed the song at Manhattan's annual "Fashion Night Out" event in 2011. The development and impact of "I Am Real" was discussed in the 2017 web series Throwback Bravo, which documented popular moments from Bravo series.

== Track listings ==
Digital download/streaming
No.	Title	Length
1.	"I Am Real"	3:12

Digital download/streaming – Thug in a Club mix
No.	Title	Length
1.	"I Am Real" (Thug in a Club mix)	3:57

== Credits and personnel ==
Credits adapted from the official press release for "I Am Real".

- Simon van Kempen – performer
- Koki Saito – composer, producer
- Jon Jason Appleton – composer
- Allison Beth Simon – composer
- Ross Hopman – producer
- Joel Simon – producer
- Rob Goldstone – executive producer
- Alex McCord – executive producer

== Release history ==
Release dates and formats for "I Am Real"
Region	Date	Format(s)	Version	Label	Ref.
Various	21 April 2011	Digital download; streaming	Original	JSM Music	
Various	12 May 2011	Digital download; streaming	Thug in a Club mix	JSM Music	
