= The Real Housewives of Atlanta season 4 =

Season of television series

The Real Housewives of Atlanta
- Season 4
- Cover used by the iTunes Store; Left to right: Zolciak-Biermann, Bailey, Parks, Leakes, Burruss and Whitfield
- Starring: NeNe Leakes; Shereé Whitfield; Kim Zolciak-Biermann; Kandi Burruss; Cynthia Bailey; Phaedra Parks
- No. of episodes: 24

Release
- Original network: Bravo
- Original release: November 6, 2011 – April 22, 2012

Season chronology
- ← Previous; Season 3 Next → Season 5

The fourth season of The Real Housewives of Atlanta, an American reality television series, was broadcast on Bravo. It aired from November 6, 2011 until April 22, 2012, and was primarily filmed in Atlanta, Georgia. Its executive producers are Lauren Eskelin, Lorraine Haughton, Glenda Hersh, Carlos King, Steven Weinstock and Andy Cohen.

The Real Housewives of Atlanta focuses on the lives of NeNe Leakes, Shereé Whitfield, Kim Zolciak-Biermann, Kandi Burruss, Cynthia Bailey and Phaedra Parks. It consisted of twenty-three episodes.

This season marked the first departure of original housewife Shereé Whitfield. She eventually returned for the show's 8th season.

== Production and crew ==
Season 4 of The Real Housewives of Atlanta was revealed along with the cast and a trailer in August 2011. The season premiered with a retrospective titled "Before They Were Stars" that was aired on October 30, 2011, which centered on a look at the wives in their younger years. The season officially began with "Nothing Ventured, Nothing Gained" on November 6, 2011, while the twentieth "Happiness & Joy" served as the season finale and was aired on April 8, 2012. It was followed by a three-part reunion April 15, April 19, and April 22, 2012, which marked the conclusion of the season. Lauren Eskelin, Lorraine Haughton, Glenda Hersh, Carlos King, and Steven Weinstock are recognized as the series' executive producers; it is produced and distributed by True Entertainment, an American subsidiary of the Italian corporation Endemol.

Several days after the final episode of season 4 the first spin-off to The Real Housewives of Atlanta, titled Don't Be Tardy, premiered on Bravo, starring Zolciak and Kroy Biermann. The series documented the couple as they prepared for their wedding and as well as the wedding day itself.

== Cast and synopsis ==
The fourth season saw no regular cast changes made at the beginning of the series other than introducing recurring cast member, Marlo Hampton. The season began as Zolciak was in the middle of her first pregnancy by her boyfriend Biermann; she later gave birth to their son. Leakes continued divorce proceedings with Gregg, while Whitfield found herself in financial difficulties after her ex-husband failed to pay child support. Meanwhile, Bailey opened her own modeling agency, while Parks looked to launch a family-operated funeral home. Leakes's new friendship with Hampton caused tension between all of the women, which escalated during a group vacation in South Africa; while Zolciak, who had remained home with her children, became upset by negative comments Bailey (not Burruss) made about her during the group vacation. As the season closed, Leakes began to reconsider her divorce from Gregg.

== Episodes ==
The Real Housewives of Atlanta season 4 episodes
No. overall	No. in season	Title	Original release date	U.S. viewers (millions)
N–A	0	"Before They Were Stars"	October 30, 2011	1.87
A special looking back at the Atlanta Housewives' younger years. Small-town upbringings, teen rebellions, and heartbreak dramas come to the fore, including childhood photos and insight from family and friends.
44	1	"Nothing Ventured, Nothing Gained"	November 6, 2011	2.89
The ladies of Atlanta are back and handling their business. Kandi branches out from her music career to start an adult toy line, while Phaedra begins her own strange undertakings. Cynthia gets the buzz going for her modeling school with a little help from celebrity runway coach Miss J. A very pregnant Kim prepares to move into a luxury home with boyfriend, baby-daddy, and young NFL star Kroy Biermann. NeNe's stock has risen since hanging with Donald Trump on Celebrity Apprentice, but Sheree confronts her on a business deal gone bad.
45	2	"Surprisingly Rich"	November 13, 2011	3.00
Fresh off her verbal smack down with Sheree, NeNe decides to take a break from Atlanta by rounding up Cynthia and Kandi for a girl’s getaway weekend of fun, sun and Lesbian Pride in Miami. Phaedra's fascination with the dead goes a step further as she explores opening her own family funeral business, but Apollo's creeped out by Phaedra's new passion. Sheree and Kim have some of their own girl time to discuss Kim and Kroy's future plans. Meanwhile, Kroy and Sweetie conspire to throw an intimate surprise bash for a very pregnant Kim's 33rd birthday, complete with expensive jewels.
46	3	"Shower the Baby, Muzzle the Boy"	November 20, 2011	3.23
Phaedra and Apollo deal with the consequences of a case of mistaken identity. Shereé is moving on up by overseeing the construction of a new house. Peter gets a warning from Cynthia’s baby daddy about the importance of getting along with your in-laws. NeNe deals with her youngest son, Brent’s adjustment to living in two homes after her separation from Gregg. Meanwhile, Kim throws a wedding-size baby shower for Kroy, but the shower games are a little more testosterone-driven than Kim had planned.
47	4	"Jewels Be Dangled"	November 27, 2011	3.03
Phaedra does the proper Southern thing and apologizes to Kim for her husband's behavior at Kim's baby shower. Shereé takes Phaedra along to see her Chateau Shereé construction site, only to find no progress has been made. Kandi plans her 35th birthday bash despite a case of the biological clock blues. The party heats up when Phaedra presents a "Ridickulous" surprise that neither Kandi — nor her mom – will ever forget. Meanwhile, Cynthia’s attempt at making peace between her husband and sister backfires, leaving her torn between her new family and her old one. Kim tries to figure out how she will handle the birth of her new son.
48	5	"Whine Bar"	December 4, 2011	3.25
Peter’s Bar One sneak preview party is just days away when his investor bounces a $40,000 check. Cynthia may have to bail her husband out, even though she promised not to invest in the bar. Shereé has her own financial concerns and confronts her ex-husband about four years of missed child support payments. Meanwhile, Kim has a heart-to-heart with her daughter Brielle over fears that the new baby will break up the family. Kandi has her own mother-daughter chat, apologizing to Mama Joyce for the incident at her birthday party. Cynthia hosts a fashion show, where Phaedra introduces the girls to "It" couple Marlo Hampton and Charles Grant.
49	6	"Three Wigs and a Baby"	December 11, 2011	3.28
Kim doesn’t make it to her due date and gives birth to her first baby boy. Meanwhile, Cynthia and NeNe take a business trip to New York City, where Cynthia gets advice on her new modeling school from old flame, Russell Simmons, and reveals to her best friend Kithe that she’s not altogether happy with her life in Atlanta. NeNe meets with her business partner, Famous Famiglia Pizza's co-owner, John Kolaj, who seems interested in having much more than a business relationship with her. Shereé’s mother makes a revelation which gives Shereé the resolve to take Bob to court for child support. Kandi gets Mama Joyce dolled up for an online dating profile photo shoot. Phaedra demonstrates her talents as a lawyer by getting her client out of hot water for drug charges.
50	7	"Law by Sheree"	December 13, 2011	2.85
When Shereé is served with legal papers, she turns to Phaedra for representation. The two Housewives confidently face Sheree’s ex in court, but to their dismay, he has a trick up his sleeve. Kim and Kroy bring baby KJ home and chaos erupts in the house when everyone, including the dog, realizes how big of an adjustment this will be. On an all-new episode of Kandi Koated Nights, Kandi chats with guests Marlo Hampton and baller boyfriend Charles Grant. One of Kandi's co-hosts asks Charles what it was like to date NeNe and it doesn’t take long for the gossip to spread. This episode marks the first appearance of Marlo as a supporting cast member.
51	8	"New Tricks"	December 18, 2011	3.41
With her townhouse bursting at the seams, Kim and her newly expanded family move into a mansion of their dreams. Shereé and Phaedra's relationship gets rocky as they deal with the aftermath of their court battle against Sheree's ex-husband. Meanwhile, Kandi decides to steer her music career in a surprising new direction. Cynthia throws a grand-opening bash at her modeling school, the Bailey Agency, where Kim and NeNe rub elbows for the first time since Cynthia's wedding.
52	9	"Unlikely Duos"	January 8, 2012	3.14
Phaedra’s ready to make her family funeral business a reality, but it’s going to take some convincing of Apollo that working with the dead isn’t as creepy as it sounds. Driven to write a hit song in every music genre, Kandi goes country and travels to Nashville to work with country music star Jo Dee Messina. Kim struggles with her oldest daughter Brielle, who begins acting up as she adjusts to life after Kim’s new baby. Seeking to put rumors to rest about her alleged tryst with a fellow Atlanta socialite’s boyfriend, NeNe meets with Marlo Hampton, and learns a lot more about her than she had expected.
53	10	"We Come in Peace (And Packing Heat)"	January 15, 2012	2.71
Cynthia and Peter join Phaedra and Apollo on a surprising double date, where they officially bury the hatchet from Kim's baby shower. Phaedra is planning a trip to South Africa and convinces Cynthia it might be the perfect setting for all the women to get in touch with their heritage and to bring some perspective to all the recent drama. Kroy brings an apprehensive Kim to the gun range to buy her first firearm, and later they visit Kim's long-time psychic, Rose, who foresees a startling prediction for their future. Meanwhile, NeNe's adoring and wealthy business partner flies to Atlanta to collaborate with her on their lounge project and shower her with a bit of retail love. Phaedra surprises Sheree with fact that NeNe and Cynthia have been invited to South Africa and her agenda to make peace in the Motherland. Later, Kandi throws an intimate dinner for all of the ladies, where Momma Joyce is determined to salvage NeNe and Kim's friendship.
54	11	"Shaping Up and Shipping Out"	January 22, 2012	2.77
Kim tries another get-skinny-quick trick as Kandi suffers through a boot camp workout to shed pounds before her trip to Africa. Phaedra fills Apollo in on socialite Marlo’s criminal history and decides to keep her distance from now on. Meanwhile, NeNe hatches a secret plan to bring Marlo along on the ladies’ 10-day journey to South Africa. While the other women prepare for their vacation, Kim is forced to prepare for life without Kroy when the NFL lockout comes to a sudden end.
55	12	"South Africa: Just Like Home"	January 29, 2012	3.94
The ladies arrive in Cape Town, South Africa for a 10-day adventure, wherein it’s officially the "Smalls" (Phaedra, Shereé and Kandi) versus the "Talls" (NeNe, Cynthia and Marlo). However, Africa works its magic on them — even NeNe and Shereé put aside their differences for the first time in months. On a yacht ride in the harbor, they open up to each other about their differences and attempt to start anew. But the love-fest is only a few hours old when NeNe's new bestie, Marlo, confronts Shereé about not inviting her to a dinner party. A huge fight erupts, with NeNe playing the unlikely role of peacemaker. Back in Atlanta, with Kroy away at football camp, Kim’s feeling the pressure of being a single mother of three.
56	13	"Make It Rain Down in Africa"	February 12, 2012	2.34
The ladies' South African vacation continues with the "Talls" and "Smalls" moving beyond Sheree and Marlo's intense showdown. After blowing off some steam at a Cape Town nightclub, the women travel to the luxurious Shamwari game reserve. On safari, NeNe finds herself caught between the competing attentions of Marlo and Cynthia, while Sheree, Phaedra, and Kandi learn about the pharmaceutical benefits of elephant dung. Later, the entire group has an opportunity to visit a South African orphanage, where they are touched by the children and leave with the sense that this trip has been a life-changing experience.
57	14	"No Bones About It"	February 19, 2012	2.48
Fresh off of their emotional trip to the orphanage, the ladies find themselves in a place of peace and harmony with one another. They get a taste of authentic African culture, visiting a local museum and a not-so-traditional herbalist. Later, they bond over sex talk at NeNe and Marlo’s cozy pajama party. But the good vibes are short-lived. Cynthia and Kandi make comments about Kim that bother Sheree so much that she decides to report back to Kim about this "betrayal."
58	15	"From Motherland to Haterville"	March 4, 2012	2.66
The ladies pack their designer bags to depart South Africa and head home to Atlanta, where new drama awaits. When NeNe’s son Bryson is arrested for stealing two razors, she debates whether to bail him out of jail or teach him a lesson. Meanwhile, Kim’s relationship with her assistant, Sweetie, starts to sour. Kim welcomes back the "Smalls" with a catered lunch at her new mansion and she confronts Kandi about the derogatory comments that were made about her in Africa.
59	16	"Peaches and Screams"	March 11, 2012	2.29
After Bryson returns home from prison, NeNe enlists some unexpected help to straighten him out. Old tensions resurface between Cynthia, Peter and Mal at the couple's one-year anniversary party. Eager to get her hands on a "real dead body," mortician-in-training Phaedra takes her first embalming class. Meanwhile, Sheree and Lawrence confront Marlo about her use of a gay slur, and Kim nears the end of her rope with her assistant Sweetie.
60	17	"The Error Apparents"	March 18, 2012	2.46
Kandi returns to Nashville to take her country-music career to the next level. Sheree considers a marriage proposal for her daughter Tierra, while NeNe reconsiders her divorce from Gregg. After causing a spectacle at her sister's anniversary party, Mal attempts to apologize to Cynthia. Phaedra throws her one-year-old son, Ayden, a Dwight-inspired party at a water park. Meanwhile, Kim and Kandi work towards healing their damaged friendship.
61	18	"Fresh Princes"	March 25, 2012	2.64
Kroy returns home after a month-long stay at football camp. Kim welcomes him with a home-cooked meal-prepared by a private chef, of course. Meanwhile NeNe has an important conversation with her youngest son; Phaedra hosts an extravagant church ceremony for her son, but drama surfaces between Kim and Cynthia.
62	19	"All Pomp But No Circumstance"	April 1, 2012	2.04
With her apprenticeship at Willie Watkins' funeral home almost complete, Phaedra helps a "real" family through the grieving process. NeNe travels to LA to meet with the creators of the hit TV show Glee and entertains the idea of moving to the west coast permanently. Kandi continues to juggle her businesses by working on designs for a new Bedroom Kandi sex toy line, while Kroy visits Kim's father to have a very important man-to-man talk. Later, all the women come out to support Phaedra at a big event at City Hall where she makes an unexpected announcement.
63	20	"Happiness & Joy"	April 8, 2012	2.31
Cynthia hosts a model call at the Bailey Agency, hoping to find Atlanta's next "it" girl. NeNe makes a major decision about her marriage, and later meets with her "business partner" John, who surprises her with another gift. Kim is also in the giving spirit and surprises her new fiancé with an extravagant birthday present. Meanwhile, Kandi launches her sex-toy line in a big way, but realizes it'll take more than masseurs and vibrators to bring "happiness and joy" to the ladies.
64	21	"Reunion: Part 1"	April 15, 2012	3.13
Hosted by Bravo's Andy Cohen, the ladies of Hotlanta -- Kim Zolciak, Kandi Burruss, NeNe Leakes, Phaedra Parks, Shereé Whitfield and Cynthia Bailey -- get together to set the record straight on some of the most talked-about antics of the season.
65	22	"Reunion: Part 2"	April 19, 2012	2.54
Hosted by Bravo's Andy Cohen, Part 2 finds Georgia peaches Kim Zolciak, Kandi Burruss, NeNe Leakes, Phaedra Parks, Shereé Whitfield, and Cynthia Bailey together on one stage to answer some of America's burning questions. Special appearances by the husbands and Marlo Hampton.
66	23	"Reunion: Part 3"	April 22, 2012	3.22
Atlanta's most famous southern belles -- Kim Zolciak, Kandi Burruss, NeNe Leakes, Phaedra Parks, Shereé Whitfield, and Cynthia Bailey -- bring the heat to Hotlanta as they wrap up an explosive season in style. This episode marks the final appearance of Shereè until returning as a supporting cast member in season 8 and full time in season 9.
67	24	"Kim & Kroy"	February 26, 2012	N/A
In this special episode, New footage of Kim and Kroy's whirlwhind romance and a preview of Kim's upcoming series.
