= I'm Real (disambiguation) =

"I'm Real" is a 2001 song by Jennifer Lopez.

I'm Real may also refer to:

- I'm Real (album), a 1988 album by James Brown
- "I'm Real" (James Brown song), a song from the album
- "I'm Real (Murder Remix)", a 2001 song by Jennifer Lopez and Ja Rule
- "I'm Real", a 1993 song from the Kris Kross album Da Bomb

== See also ==
- "I Am Real", a 2011 song by Simon van Kempen
