= The Real Housewives of Atlanta season 3 =

Season of television series

The Real Housewives of Atlanta
- Season 3
- Cover used by the iTunes Store; Left to right: Parks, Leakes, Whitfield, Bailey, Zolciak-Biermann, and Burruss
- Starring: NeNe Leakes; Shereé Whitfield; Kim Zolciak; Kandi Burruss; Cynthia Bailey; Phaedra Parks
- No. of episodes: 18

Release
- Original network: Bravo
- Original release: October 4, 2010 – February 20, 2011

Season chronology
- ← Previous; Season 2 Next → Season 4

The third season of The Real Housewives of Atlanta, an American reality television series, was broadcast on Bravo. It aired from October 4, 2010, until February 20, 2011, and was primarily filmed in Atlanta, Georgia. Its executive producers are Lauren Eskelin, Lorraine Haughton, Glenda Hersh, Carlos King, Steven Weinstock and Andy Cohen.

The Real Housewives of Atlanta focuses on the lives of NeNe Leakes, Shereé Whitfield, Kim Zolciak, Kandi Burruss, Cynthia Bailey and Phaedra Parks. It consisted of eighteen episodes.

== Production and crew ==
Season 3 of The Real Housewives of Atlanta was revealed along with the cast and a trailer in August, 2010. The season premiere episode "New Attitude" was broadcast on October 4, 2010, while the sixteenth episode "The Bride and the Doom" served as the season finale, and was aired on January 30, 2011. It was followed by a two-part reunion that aired on February 13, and February 20, 2011, which marked the conclusion of the season. Lauren Eskelin, Lorraine Haughton, Glenda Hersh, Carlos King, and Steven Weinstock are recognized as the series' executive producers; it is produced and distributed by True Entertainment, an American subsidiary of the Italian corporation Endemol.

== Cast and synopsis ==
Season 3 saw the departure of Lisa Wu, who returned in a guest appearance, and introduced 2 new wives, Cynthia Bailey and Phaedra Parks. The season depicted Leakes and Zolciak reconcile, as the former contemplated divorcing her husband Gregg and then Kim Z began a lesbian relationship. Parks, who was in the middle of her pregnancy, clashed with her husband Apollo Nida over their differing opinions on parenting; she gave birth later in the season. Meanwhile, Zolciak and Burruss continued recording music together, although they clashed over their creative differences. Bailey later became engaged to her boyfriend Peter Thomas, while Zolciak set her affections on football player Kroy Biermann; a conflict between Burruss, Leakes, and Zolciak later ensued while the latter two women embark on a promotional concert tour. Against the advice of her mother and sister, Bailey married Thomas in the third-season finale.

== Episodes ==
The Real Housewives of Atlanta season 3 episodes
No. overall	No. in season	Title	Original release date	U.S. viewers (millions)
26	1	"New Attitude"	October 4, 2010	2.41
Gossip spreads fast when Kim reveals her lesbian affair in the tabloids, and NeNe rekindles her roller coaster relationship with Kim just in time to get the inside scoop. NeNe’s got drama of her own — her marriage is on the rocks and her old friend Dwight has been spreading rumors behind her back. Shereé pursues her long-time dream of becoming an actress and Kandi starts getting back into the dating scene. NeNe, Kim and Sheree hit up a couture shoe event and run into new housewife Phaedra – the pregnant, classy, but sassy attorney-to-the-stars, who arrives with her old pal Dwight. Phaedra and Cynthia are added to the opening credits replacing departing cast member Lisa. This episode marks the first appearance of Phaedra.
27	2	"Model Behavior"	October 11, 2010	2.26
NeNe attends Atlanta Dogwood Festival with her friend Cynthia and gives her side of the showdown with Dwight. Cynthia, a model who has recently relocated to Atlanta, lends a sympathetic ear. But NeNe’s troubles don’t end there. Her home life is crumbling, having recently thrown Brice out of the house. Sheree agrees to go on a blind date with a doctor, and surprises herself when she enjoys the dance club he takes her that’s located in the wrong part of town. Kim is invited to perform at the White Party, a huge gay circuit party in Palm Springs. Meanwhile, Kandi records a hot track with multi-platinum artist, Ne-Yo and then decides to test out some new material at Atlanta hot spot, Uptown Supper Club, which is owned by Cynthia and her boyfriend, Peter. This episode marks the first appearance of Cynthia.
28	3	"White Hot"	October 18, 2010	2.24
Kandi travels to Palm Springs to offer advice and support to Kim, who’s been invited to perform at one of the biggest gay circuit parties –- the White Party. With only one song on her playlist is Kim ready for her first concert appearance? NeNe has an honest talk with Brentt about Brice's brush with the law. After Sheree takes the high road with Dwight and his claims to have paid for the She By Sheree fashion show last year she reunites with her oldest daughter, Tierra who has moved back to Atlanta after being away at college. New housewife Cynthia struggles with her feelings about marriage, while Phaedra and Apollo don’t see eye to eye when it comes to parenting.
29	4	"Petty Boughetto"	October 25, 2010	2.49
Despite the toll her marital problems and troubles with Bryson are taking on NeNe, she is determined to get her "happy" back, even if that's through plastic surgery. Phaedra and Cynthia finally find time to get to know each other better as they attend Atlanta's premiere horse racing event, the Steeplechase. Inspired by a late night host, Kim is ready to be a two-hit wonder and asks Kandi to write her next song. Dwight helps Phaedra plan her over-the-top Kentucky Derby-themed baby shower. Kandi, Cynthia, Lisa and Kim quickly realize this shower is unlike any other shower they've ever attended. Former cast member Lisa makes a guest appearance.
30	5	"Hot Mama's Day"	November 1, 2010	2.74
Kim states her views on cheating, as a guest on Kandi's web chat show "Kandi Koated Nights". NeNe reveals more than just her new nose to Cynthia, and Sheree has a finger lickin' good time on a date with the "Love Doctor". Meanwhile, Phaedra gets personal with a jar of pickles for her pregnancy photo shoot. When the ladies get together at Cynthia's to celebrate Mother's Day, the topic of sex becomes the main course, but by dessert, NeNe's marital issues take the cake.
31	6	"Trashed Collection"	November 7, 2010	2.49
NeNe hopes to inspire a career path for her late bloomer son by introducing him to Cynthia's club-owner boyfriend. Meanwhile, Kim lays down music tracks with Kandi's help, but creative differences create dissension; and NeNe's marriage issues escalate to the breaking point.
32	7	"She Can Dance?"	November 14, 2010	2.77
Trying to prove she can dance, a driven Sheree steps up in a regional dance-themed charity event. Elsewhere, Phaedra prepares to give birth. Tension mounts between Kandi and Kim over a new song. A cunning proposal surprises Cynthia, and Kim develops a new crush (Kim meets Kroy).
33	8	"Is There a Doctor in the House?"	November 21, 2010	2.99
With her due date still a mystery to all, Phaedra prepares to give birth by arriving in Augusta to see her doctor. Elsewhere, NeNe tries to land a post as an entertainment reporter at a local TV station, and Sheree hosts a party, but NeNe's inside scoop about Sheree's date stirs up the drama. Former cast member Lisa makes a guest appearance.
34	9	"NeNe Get Your Gun"	November 28, 2010	3.22
Phaedra adjusts to motherhood as she brings her new baby home from the hospital and proving it doesn't get easier, Kim wrestles with her daughter's questions about sex. Sheree decides that she has had enough and confronts "the doctor" about his evasiveness. Kandi rewrites "The Ring Didn't Mean a Thing" to make it more Kim-friendly and plays the new track at Kim's parents' dinner party. Cynthia plans her dream wedding with a celebrated stylist friend and high-end wedding planner, while NeNe's marriage nears the breaking point as her relationship problems are exposed in a very public way, leading to a dramatic confrontation with Gregg.
35	10	"Auto-Tuned-Up"	December 5, 2010	3.22
Kim went back to Jan to work on her vocals and sings "The Ring Didn't Mean a Thing". Meanwhile, Kandi has a nascar race for charity and does somewhat okay.
36	11	"Contract Player"	December 12, 2010	2.92
It's time for Kim to start rehearsing for her upcoming tour with Kandi, but she's more interested in get-skinny-quick treatments than learning the choreography for her show. Sheree receives some good news about her talent agency audition and enlists Kandi's help to prepare for her role in a local play. Tension lingers from NeNe and Peter's blow-up phone fight. The ladies think that Cynthia's priorities are a bit off, but Cynthia has a plan to smooth things over with NeNe with a friend contract. Meanwhile, Dwight tells Phaedra what everyone has been saying about her mysterious pregnancy. Phaedra is not happy and intends to confront the ladies about the gossip.
37	12	"Not So Fine Print"	December 19, 2010	3.21
With her tour quickly approaching, Kandi has only a week to finish her new album and make sure that Kim is stage ready as her opening act. Cynthia tries to reconcile with NeNe and make up for the awkwardness of her "friendship contract," but NeNe's got bigger problems when she's put on the spot to deliver a big celebrity interview for her local entertainment segment. Mother definitely knows best when Sheree and daughter Tierra go furniture shopping, and Phaedra, fresh out of the maternity ward, is in full protective mommy-mode and confronts Kim about all the bad-mouthing she has been doing about her due date.
38	13	"Tour-ture"	January 9, 2011	3.34
Phaedra is worried about having Kim at their ultra southern baby debut — Ayden's Sip n' See party, but when Kim shows up with her nursing license, Phaedra is ready to hear her out. Meanwhile, NeNe has no worries about nailing her interview with Jermaine Dupri, until she is thrown a curve ball. When Cynthia's fiancé, Peter, reveals that his restaurant is on the brink of financial collapse, Cynthia's dream wedding is in jeopardy and not even a counseling session can solve their problems. After a tearful goodbye with her girls, Kim is confident she's going to kill it on Kandi's promo tour. However, when the tour kicks off in Charlotte and Kim proceeds to complain about everything from the schedule to the size of her bunk, Kandi realizes she had no idea what she was in for.
39	14	"Flamingo Road Block"	January 16, 2011	3.27
NeNe's "keeping it real" as she presents her first on-air interview with star producer Jermaine Dupri for her local news segment; but Kim takes NeNe's on-air mention of 'Tardy for the Party' as a deliberate jab. With their wedding only two weeks away, Peter reveals to Cynthia that their financial situation is dire, putting both their wedding plans and their relationship on the rocks. Phaedra struggles with being both a lawyer and a new mom, while Sheree sends her kids off for a visit with their dad. Kandi has all but had enough of Kim and Sweetie's antics on their bus tour, and when NeNe joins them in Orlando for the last leg of the trip, a massive fight erupts among the ladies.
40	15	"Floridon't"	January 23, 2011	3.42
Kandi's tour bus makes it to Miami, where Phaedra, Sheree and Cynthia are awaiting its arrival. Their plans for a fun, relaxing weekend to celebrate Cynthia's bachelorette are quickly dashed when the bus doors open to reveal Kim and NeNe in the middle of a blowout fight. Kim and Kandi celebrate the final show of their promo tour and NeNe invites her best friend Diana down to stay at the house with the ladies. A brief respite from the battle comes as Cynthia walks in a Miami Swim Week swimsuit fashion show, but Cynthia's own thrill of being back on the runway is short-lived. When pressed by the other women to talk about her upcoming wedding, Cynthia breaks down in tears over the stress of her nearing nuptials.
41	16	"The Bride and the Doom"	January 30, 2011	4.38
Cynthia has her wedding but like any Atlanta event, drama is not far behind. Gregg apologizes for his actions toward NeNe. Sheree's acting ability is sorely tested during a movie audition. Phaedra returns to work after having the baby. Kim has her breasts redone and announces she and Kroy are getting serious. And Kandi talks with Kim over disputes with 'The Ring Didn't Mean a Thing." The third season closes as Cynthia and Peter's rocky road toward marriage ends when the two wed.
42	17	"Reunion: Part 1"	February 13, 2011	2.40
The ladies reunite to discuss the dramatic events of the third season, and NeNe goes another round with Kim.
43	18	"Reunion: Part 2"	February 20, 2011	2.65
The Housewives reunite for the second part of the season three reunion.
