= Countess Vaughn =

American actress and singer (born 1978)

- Born: Countess Danielle Vaughn; August 8, 1978 (age 48); Idabel, Oklahoma, U.S.
- Other name: Countess Vaughn James
- Occupations: Actress; singer; television personality
- Years active: 1981–present
- Known for: Kim Parker on Moesha and The Parkers
- Spouse: Joseph James (m. 2002; div. 2005)
- Partner: David Whitten (2006–2018)
- Children: 2
- Musical career
- Genres: R&B; new jack swing; hip hop
- Instrument: Vocals
- Label: Charisma Records

Countess Danielle Vaughn (born August 8, 1978) is an American actress, singer and television personality. She is known for her role as Kim Parker on the UPN sitcoms Moesha and its spin-off The Parkers, and as Alexandria DeWitt on 227.

== Early life ==
Vaughn was born in Idabel, Oklahoma, to Sandra and Leo Vaughn. She began her performing career at age three in 1981, singing at church. At nine in 1988, she sang "I'll Be There" to win the Star Search junior vocalist champion and overall junior champion. Following that success, she was cast as Alexandria DeWitt in the fourth season of NBC sitcom, 227 at the start of its fourth season in 1988. Vaughn left the show the following year.

== Career ==
In the 1990s, Vaughn guest-starred on Thea, Hangin' with Mr. Cooper, and Roc. Outside of television, she performed in the off-Broadway musical Mama, I Want to Sing! Part 3. In 1992, Vaughn released her first album, Countess, featuring a variety of songs, including dance music and R&B. The album's lead single, a cover of James Brown's "It's A Man's, Man's, Man's World", charted in the top-100 of the Billboard R&B/Hip-Hop Songs chart; the album itself sold 3,000 copies.

Vaughn's breakthrough role was playing Kim Parker in the UPN sitcom Moesha. She co-starred on the show from 1996 to 1999. In 1998, Vaughn was honored with an NAACP Image Award for Outstanding Supporting Actress in a Comedy Series for her performance in Moesha. In 1999, Vaughn starred in and also sang the theme song for the show's spin-off The Parkers, opposite actress and comedian Mo'Nique. The series aired from 1999 until 2004. On film, Vaughn co-starred in Trippin (1999) and in later years guest starred on Cuts and Let's Stay Together.

== Personal life ==
On January 16, 2002, Vaughn married Joseph James. The couple had a son before divorcing in 2005. Vaughn also has a daughter, born in 2009, with ex-fiancé David Whitten.

During an appearance on The Doctors, Vaughn revealed that she suffered from hair loss due to bad reactions from glue used on wigs she wore for many years. She also has discoloration on her skin in many places.

=== Reality television ===
In the mid-2000s, Vaughn appeared in the third season of Celebrity Fit Club in January 2006 on VH1. She later appeared as a contestant on MTV's Celebrity Rap Superstar on August 30, 2007.

In 2014, Vaughn began starring in the TV One reality series Hollywood Divas, alongside Golden Brooks, Lisa Wu, and Paula Jai Parker. The series premiered on October 8, 2014. During the first season, Vaughn revealed that she had an abortion around the age of 18. She said, "I had an unwanted pregnancy. I had just started my TV show. I knew that in black Hollywood, a girl having a baby, they’d get rid of you. I had to do something about it. I had to make a decision to get rid of a child for my career.".

== Filmography ==
Year	Title	Role	Notes
1988–1989	227	Alexandria DeWitt	Series regular, 13 episodes Nominated — Young Artist Award for Best Young Actress in a Supporting Role in a Comedy or Drama Series or Special (1989)
1992	Fievel's American Tails	Monique (Voice)	Episode: "Fievel, the Lonesome Ranger"
1992–1993	Hangin' with Mr. Cooper	Keisha	Recurring role, 3 episodes
1993–1994	Thea	Charlene	Episode: "Danesha Project"
1993–1994	Roc	Carlita	Episodes: "He Ain't Heavy, He's My Father" and "The Last Temptation of Roc"
1996	Minor Adjustments	Monique	Episode: "Witness"
1996–1999	Moesha	Kim Parker	Series regular, 83 episodes NAACP Image Award for Outstanding Supporting Actress in a Comedy Series (1998); Nominated — NAACP Image Award for Outstanding Supporting Actress in a Comedy Series (1999–2000)
1997	Goode Behavior		Episode: "Goode Lovin'"
1999–2004	The Parkers	Kim Parker	Series regular 110 episodes
1999	Trippin'	Anetta Jones	
2001	Max Keeble's Big Move	Office Admin. Assistant	
2006	Celebrity Fit Club	Herself	
2006	Cuts	Kelli	Episode: "Adult Education"
2006	The Boo Crew	Dee Dee	
2011	Let's Stay Together	Chanteuse	Episode: "Back Together Again"
2014	More to Love	Karen	
2014–2016	Hollywood Divas	Herself	Series regular
2015	The White Sistas	London White	Also producer
2020	Dish Nation	Self	Episode: "The 10 Best Celebrity Feuds You May Have Forgotten"
2023	Harlem	Herself	Episode: Out of the Deadpan and into the Fire (season 2, episode 6)

== Discography ==
=== Studio albums ===
- Countess (1992)

=== Singles ===
- It's A Man's, Man's, Man's World (1992)
- Wait For Me (1992)
- Do You Love Him?/I'm Wifey (2016)
