= List of Don't Be Tardy... episodes =

Don't Be Tardy... is an American reality television series aired on Bravo that debuted on April 26, 2012, as Don't Be Tardy For The Wedding. It is a spin-off of The Real Housewives of Atlanta. The series features Kim Zolciak, her husband Kroy Biermann and her family. The first season documented the couple as they prepared for their wedding, as well as documenting the wedding day itself. It was announced in November 2012 that the series had been renamed to its current title upon renewal. Later seasons follow the day-to-day lives of the Zolciak-Biermann family.

== Series overview ==
Don't Be Tardy episodes
| Season | Episodes | Originally released | |
| Season | Episodes | First released | Last released |
|---|---|---|---|
| 1 | 9 | April 26, 2012 | June 14, 2012 |
| 2 | 12 | April 16, 2013 | June 25, 2013 |
| 3 | 13 | July 17, 2014 | September 21, 2014 |
| 4 | 12 | August 16, 2015 | November 5, 2015 |
| 5 | 12 | September 14, 2016 | December 14, 2016 |
| 6 | 12 | October 6, 2017 | December 15, 2017 |
| 7 | 12 | February 17, 2019 | April 26, 2019 |
| 8 | 13 | October 6, 2020 | December 29, 2020 |

== Episodes ==
=== Season 1 (2012) ===
Don't Be Tardy..., season 1 episodes
| No. overall | No. in season | Title | Original release date | US viewers (millions) |
|---|---|---|---|---|
| 1 | 1 | "2 Months to the Altar" | April 26, 2012 | 1.39 |
Kim meets up with Colin Cowie to plan her winter-themed wedding. Later, Kim heads to various bridal stores in order to find the most elegant wedding gown.
| 2 | 2 | "How to Dress a Bride in 6 Weeks" | April 26, 2012 | 1.67 |
Kim prepares for her wedding by working out. She later flies to New York City in order to continue her search for the perfect gown. While there, she plans a surprise birthday celebration for her daughter Ariana.
| 3 | 3 | "The Biermanns Are Coming!" | May 3, 2012 | 1.45 |
Kroy's parents fly to Atlanta for a week. Kim nervously prepares for them to arrive because she believes they don't approve of her as a wife.
| 4 | 4 | "At the Fifty Yard Line" | May 10, 2012 | 1.26 |
Kim helps her oldest daughter, Brielle, get ready for her first homecoming dance. Later, Kim revokes her mother's invitation to her food tasting party.
| 5 | 5 | "Port-a-Pology" | May 17, 2012 | 1.33 |
Kroy tells Kim that they should each compose their own wedding vows. Kim refuses to let her guests use the restrooms inside, goes on the hunt for luxury portable bathrooms, and later attempts to let her mother back into her life.
| 6 | 6 | "Maid of Dishonor" | May 24, 2012 | 1.23 |
Kim hunts for the perfect wedding gift for her soon-to-be husband Kroy. She is stressed when everything seems to be going on and her maid of honor isn't completing her duties.
| 7 | 7 | "One Wig Left to Go" | May 31, 2012 | 2.02 |
The couple make sure that security is in full force at the wedding, hiring armed men and attack dogs to ward away unwanted guests. Kim gets sick prior to the wedding.
| 8 | 8 | "Our Wedding Goes to 11...11......" | June 7, 2012 | 1.75 |
Kim waits for her designated wedding wig to be completed and frantically makes sure the event crew has finished the venue.
| 9 | 9 | "We Fly Above" | June 14, 2012 | 2.34 |
Kim and Kroy get married but drama ensues when Kim and her mother have a confrontation. Later, everyone at the wedding is annoyed by the paparazzi who is hovering overhead in helicopters.

=== Season 2 (2013) ===
Don't Be Tardy..., season 2 episodes
| No. overall | No. in season | Title | Original release date | US viewers (millions) |
|---|---|---|---|---|
| 10 | 1 | "Busting Out All Over" | April 16, 2013 | 1.15 |
Kim and Kroy's life within their townhouse — which includes two daughters, two baby boys and two nannies — turns out to be a tight squeeze. Kim has doubts about purchasing an unfinished foreclosure after she is confronted with several issues. Kim and Shun make the best of the situation while cleaning out the family's unneeded items. Later, Kim and Kroy sit down to relax after their day but are shocked when they receive news that Kim's mother wants to cause more trouble.
| 11 | 2 | "Parent Trapped" | April 16, 2013 | 1.25 |
Kim is informed of her mother's choice to seek court-ordered visitation of the girls. Kim decides to celebrate Ariana's birthday by having an extravagant birthday celebration. Later, the media reveals Kim's mother's choice, which leads to her having to tell the girls the truth about their grandmother.
| 12 | 3 | "Plan-Iversary" | April 23, 2013 | 0.90 |
Kim waits until the last minute to plan her and Kroy's one-year anniversary celebration. Kroy is playing an away game on the day of the anniversary and isn't too pleased with surprises.
| 13 | 4 | "The Blonde Side" | April 30, 2013 | 0.72 |
Kim and Kroy take a drive to see Psychic Rose, who predicts that the Falcons will go to the Super Bowl. Kim decides to expand her knowledge of the football culture by learning from the ladies' football league. Later, Kim invites Brielle and her friend to one of Kroy's upcoming games.
| 14 | 5 | "Offensive Play" | May 7, 2013 | 0.94 |
The Biermanns take the first step of Kroy becoming the legal father of Brielle and Ariana. Due to Brielle's under-performing at school, Kim hires a tutor in order to get her grades up. The idea of Brielle receiving a car is brought up and Kroy is quick to shut the conversation down by stating Brielle hasn't done enough work to deserve one. In the end, Kim realizes that Kroy becoming their legal father means that she has to share some of her decision-making power.
| 15 | 6 | "Frozen Turkey" | May 14, 2013 | 1.17 |
Thanksgiving is coming up but things turn sour when the family is betrayed by someone they would've never thought. Not letting the problems get in the way, the Biermanns come together to celebrate Thanksgiving by serving a feast — that comes fresh out of the take-out box.
| 16 | 7 | "If It's Not One Thing, It's Your Mother" | May 21, 2013 | 1.00 |
Kim and Kroy prepare to try for another child, and Kim is taking all the steps to plan the upcoming pregnancy right, hoping it'll be a girl. Later, she is forced to attend mediation with her parents alone due to Kroy working.
| 17 | 8 | "Don't Double Dip" | May 28, 2013 | 0.94 |
Brielle's report card isn't as good as Kim would've hoped, but Kim ungrounds her anyway, in hopes that it will raise her grades. Brielle goes out on her first real date, and Kim is behind the scenes making sure it all goes well.
| 18 | 9 | "Jingle Bells, This Tree Smells..." | June 4, 2013 | 1.09 |
The holiday season has arrived at the Biermann residence. Kim starts to prepare the house with holiday decorations, starting with her designer, fake Christmas tree. Kroy thinks that Christmas is centered around family traditions, which includes a real tree.
| 19 | 10 | "IUADD" | June 11, 2013 | 1.00 |
Kim and Kroy discuss having another child with Brielle and Ariana. Brielle doesn't seem to agree with the idea.
| 20 | 11 | "Bittersweet 16" | June 25, 2013 | 1.32 |
Due to the Falcons not making it to the Super Bowl, Kim and Kroy decide to take the family on vacation to the Turks and Caicos Islands. While there, Kim spends much needed time with Brielle and Ariana, and Kroy discusses his upcoming court date that will finalize the girls' adoption.
| 21 | 12 | "The Biermann Bunch" | June 25, 2013 | 1.32 |
The Biermanns happily attend court in order to complete the girls' adoption process. They also learn that their house is almost finished. Kim and Kroy think that their wish of having a baby girl might happen sooner than they thought.

=== Season 3 (2014) ===
Don't Be Tardy..., season 3 episodes
| No. overall | No. in season | Title | Original release date | US viewers (millions) |
|---|---|---|---|---|
| 22 | 1 | "The Biermann Bunch" | July 17, 2014 | 1.12 |
Twins Kaia Rose and Kane Ren are born, while Kim and Kroy struggle to manage six kids and have Kroy rehabilatate from an injury at the same time. Kim and Kroy discuss how to prevent further pregnancies.
| 23 | 2 | "Crowd Control" | July 24, 2014 | 0.93 |
Kim and Kroy decide they need to hire more help after the birth of the twins. Sweetie volunteers to hire people, and the results are questionable. KJ breaks his leg while roughhousing with Lana.
| 24 | 3 | "Making the Cut" | July 27, 2014 | 1.22 |
After much discussion, Kim and Kroy decide Kroy should get a vasectomy to prevent further babies. After Kroy's surgery, Lana is left to handle KJ's broken leg and Kroy's pain. Meanwhile, Ariana is preoccupied with ogling the pool boy hired by Sweetie.
| 25 | 4 | "Destination Destin" | July 31, 2014 | 1.13 |
While planning their trip to Destin, Florida, Kim decides to have her stylist, Shun, bring her five more pieces of Louis Vuitton luggage to accommodate Kane and Kaia, even though Kroy disapproves. Meanwhile, Kim and Kroy take an RV and their Escalade ESV to get to Destin, where their trip starts by being rained into their house.
| 26 | 5 | "Spring Break Forever, Biermanns" | August 7, 2014 | 0.90 |
Kim and Kroy try to ignore the awkwardness after their heated conversation about Brielle. Brielle wants to go jet-skiing, but Kim disapproves. Kroy busts the paparazzi taking pictures of the family on a private beach.
| 27 | 6 | "Flipping Out" | August 14, 2014 | 0.99 |
| 28 | 7 | "I Need a Man" | August 17, 2014 | 1.28 |
| 29 | 8 | "Outward Bound" | August 24, 2014 | 1.00 |
| 30 | 9 | "Campfire Confessions" | August 31, 2014 | N/A |
| 31 | 10 | "Future Shock" | September 11, 2014 | 0.84 |
| 32 | 11 | "Kimmie's Back" | September 18, 2014 | 0.82 |
| 33 | 12 | "Off the Bench" | September 21, 2014 | 1.05 |
| 34 | 13 | "Security Cam Sessions" | September 25, 2014 | 0.73 |

=== Season 4 (2015) ===
Don't Be Tardy..., season 4 episodes
| No. overall | No. in season | Title | Original release date | US viewers (millions) |
|---|---|---|---|---|
| 35 | 1 | "On the Move" | August 16, 2015 | 1.37 |
Kroy becomes an NFL free agent. Kim and Kroy try to look at the situation in a positive way knowing that they all may have to move out.
| 36 | 2 | "18 and Out" | August 23, 2015 | 1.10 |
Brielle turns 18, with her graduation date approaching. Kim feels she needs a therapist. Brielle receives a very expensive gift.
| 37 | 3 | "Destin-ation Unknown" | August 30, 2015 | 1.25 |
With no word about where the Biermanns may be moving next year, the family calms their nerves with their annual spring break vacation to Destin, Florida. Instead of leaving her troubles behind at home, Kim finds more of them when she has to deal with crying babies, angry alligators, a stressed-out Shun, and a surprising revelation from Brielle at dinner.
| 38 | 4 | "The Love Gurus" | September 13, 2015 | 1.01 |
Chef Tracey has become an invaluable asset to the Biermann clan, but Tracey's over-the-top stories have Kim and Kroy wondering about her bizarre personal life, which includes fables of her longtime girlfriend, Brooklyn. Unsure if Tracey's girlfriend even exists, Kim suggests the couples go on a double date together. Meanwhile, Ariana is barreling into her teenage years and is bucking against Kim and Kroy's strict rules. Eager to get away from the Biermann circus, Ariana announces her plans to be emancipated when she turns 16.
| 39 | 5 | "Kim's Roots" | September 20, 2015 | 1.09 |
Kim makes an appearance at Mohegan Sun in her hometown of Windsor Locks, Connecticut. After 16 years away, she decides to take Kroy home for a stroll down memory lane. Stops on the emotional tour include the apartment where she raised Brielle, lunch with her high-school friends, and an impromptu tour of the house she grew up in.
| 40 | 6 | "The Kim's Speech" | September 27, 2015 | 0.99 |
An invitation for Kim to speak at the Atlanta Women's Expo brings conflict to the Biermann home, with Kim set against the idea and Kroy wanting her to overcome her lifelong fear of public speaking. When Brielle reveals that her dream job is to become an entertainment reporter, Kim sets up a practice interview with recording artist Monica.
| 41 | 7 | "The Biermann Carnival" | October 4, 2015 | 0.94 |
Brielle is graduating from high school and Kim and Kroy haven't planned a thing. They have less than a week to pull together a carnival-themed party filled with clowns, fire dancers, and a monkey. Kim's special graduation surprise for Brielle could mean one less kid in the family nest.
| 42 | 8 | "That's Not Healthy" | October 8, 2015 | 0.76 |
When Tracey reveals all the questionable ingredients that can sneak into some of her favorite foods, Kim reluctantly agrees to plant an organic garden. Kim isn't the only one doing something against her will though, as Shun's laundry list of things she's looking for in a man has Kim concerned. Kim takes matters into her own hands, decides to set Shun up with her trainer, and drags Kroy along to help chaperone.
| 43 | 9 | "Moving On, Moving Out" | October 15, 2015 | 0.72 |
New graduate Brielle has been so focused on moving to Los Angeles with Slade that she has failed to mention some surprising news to Kim and Kroy about her plans for college. Tracey reveals that she is newly single and, much to Kim's dismay, ready to mingle.
| 44 | 10 | "A Big Splash" | October 22, 2015 | 0.78 |
The Biermann bunch spend the weekend at Slade's family lake house. There they meet Slade's mom, Toni, and enjoy a weekend of swimming, boating and tubing. Brielle and Slade ponder their future together when both sets of parents squash the couple's plans to move to California. Tracey bonds with Slade's mom through an unusual method.
| 45 | 11 | "Hello Hollywood" | October 29, 2015 | 0.79 |
With high school graduation barely out of sight, it's already time for Brielle to pack up and get moving, but not before a quick trip to Los Angeles, where she's given the opportunity of a lifetime at E! News. Kim acts as Brielle's biggest cheerleader, while Kroy continues to have doubts. Convinced that Gloria's job as an assistant is easy, Tracey volunteers to take over her job when Gloria leaves for her wedding.
| 46 | 12 | "Empty Nest?" | November 5, 2015 | 0.74 |
Kim takes Brielle and Slade to their first psychic reading with Rose, who has some surprising predictions. Meanwhile, a startling discovery is made in the garage as an unwelcome guest brings some friends along with it. With Kroy heading off to camp, Tracey and Kim are left to defend the house.

=== Season 5 (2016) ===
Don't Be Tardy..., season 5 episodes
| No. overall | No. in season | Title | Original release date | US viewers (millions) |
|---|---|---|---|---|
| 47 | 1 | "Eggs on Ice" | September 14, 2016 | 1.23 |
| 48 | 2 | "Free Ballin'" | September 21, 2016 | 0.73 |
| 49 | 3 | "Animal House" | September 28, 2016 | 0.81 |
| 50 | 4 | "Home on the Range Part 1" | October 5, 2016 | 0.77 |
| 51 | 5 | "Home on the Range Part 2" | October 12, 2016 | 0.78 |
| 52 | 6 | "Ask, Believe, Receive, Gamble" | October 26, 2016 | 0.69 |
| 53 | 7 | "Hollywood or Bust" | November 2, 2016 | 0.61 |
| 54 | 8 | "Lights, Camera, Action" | November 9, 2016 | 0.91 |
| 55 | 9 | "Middle Child Syndrome" | November 16, 2016 | 0.59 |
| 56 | 10 | "The Biermann Olympics" | November 30, 2016 | 0.65 |
| 57 | 11 | "Launch Party" | December 7, 2016 | 0.68 |
| 58 | 12 | "Life Goes On" | December 14, 2016 | 0.78 |

=== Season 6 (2017) ===
Don't Be Tardy..., season 6 episodes
| No. overall | No. in season | Title | Original release date | US viewers (millions) |
|---|---|---|---|---|
| 59 | 1 | "Bongiorno Biermanns" | October 6, 2017 | 0.74 |
| 60 | 2 | "Mi Chiamo Kim" | October 6, 2017 | 0.69 |
| 61 | 3 | "Pigeons, Piazzas, Proposals" | October 13, 2017 | 0.74 |
| 62 | 4 | "Wigs, Lies, and Videotape" | October 13, 2017 | 0.60 |
| 63 | 5 | "How to Baseball" | October 20, 2017 | 0.64 |
| 64 | 6 | "Brielle Throws a Curveball" | October 27, 2017 | 0.67 |
| 65 | 7 | "One Door Closes, Another One Opens" | November 3, 2017 | 0.78 |
| 66 | 8 | "The Incident" | November 10, 2017 | 0.93 |
| 67 | 9 | "Meet the Parents" | November 17, 2017 | 0.93 |
| 68 | 10 | "Sinn, You've Been Gone" | December 1, 2017 | 0.87 |
| 69 | 11 | "Beach Please" | December 8, 2017 | 0.88 |
| 70 | 12 | "I Do Take Two" | December 15, 2017 | 0.88 |

=== Season 7 (2019) ===
Don't Be Tardy..., season 7 episodes
| No. overall | No. in season | Title | Original release date | US viewers (millions) |
|---|---|---|---|---|
| 71 | 1 | "Prom and Circumstance" | February 17, 2019 | 1.21 |
| 72 | 2 | "A Rose Among Thorns" | February 17, 2019 | 1.11 |
| 73 | 3 | "Loaded Statement" | February 22, 2019 | 0.50 |
| 74 | 4 | "But First Coffee" | March 1, 2019 | 0.69 |
| 75 | 5 | "Mother Tucker" | March 8, 2019 | 0.54 |
| 76 | 6 | "Oh Brother!" | March 15, 2019 | 0.56 |
| 77 | 7 | "Lordy Lordy, Kimmie's 40" | March 22, 2019 | 0.55 |
| 78 | 8 | "Brielle Doesn't Live Here Anymore" | March 29, 2019 | 0.50 |
| 79 | 9 | "Get Off My Wig" | April 5, 2019 | 0.56 |
| 80 | 10 | "Kim Over Troubled Water" | April 12, 2019 | 0.55 |
| 81 | 11 | "Performance Anxiety" | April 19, 2019 | 0.43 |
| 82 | 12 | "Special" | April 26, 2019 | N/A |

=== Season 8 (2020) ===
Don't Be Tardy..., season 7 episodes
| No. overall | No. in season | Title | Original release date | US viewers (millions) |
|---|---|---|---|---|
| 83 | 1 | "A Very Biermann Road Trip" | October 6, 2020 | N/A |
| 84 | 2 | "Bugs, Boots, and Bombshells" | October 6, 2020 | N/A |
| 85 | 3 | "Stuck in the Mud With You" | October 13, 2020 | N/A |
| 86 | 4 | "A Country Ghost Town Jamboree" | October 20, 2020 | N/A |
| 87 | 5 | "From Branson to Breakdown" | October 27, 2020 | N/A |
| 88 | 6 | "Stuck in Middle America" | November 10, 2020 | N/A |
| 89 | 7 | "Dude, Where's the Dudes?" | November 17, 2020 | N/A |
| 90 | 8 | "Crystals, Caves and Kim" | November 24, 2020 | N/A |
| 91 | 9 | "One way Ticket to Quitsville" | December 1, 2020 | N/A |
| 92 | 10 | "Nirvana, Nevada" | December 10, 2020 | N/A |
| 93 | 11 | "Road trip Quiz 810" | December 15, 2020 | N/A |
| 94 | 12 | "Finale" | December 15, 2020 | N/A |
