= Don't Be Tardy... =

American reality television series

- Also known as: Don't Be Tardy for the Wedding (season 1)
- Genre: Reality television
- Starring: Kim Zolciak-Biermann; Kroy Biermann; Brielle Biermann; Ariana Biermann; KJ Biermann; Kash Biermann; Kaia Biermann; Kane Biermann; Tracey Bloom; Berta
- Opening theme: "Tardy for the Wedding" by Kim Zolciak (season 1) "Tardy for the Party" by Kim Zolciak (seasons 2–8)
- Country of origin: United States
- Original language: English
- No. of seasons: 8
- No. of episodes: 95 (list of episodes)

Production
- Executive producers: Steven Weinstock; Glenda Hersh; Lauren Eskelin; Troy VanderHeyden; Michelle Schiefen; Kim Zolciak-Biermann; Kroy Biermann
- Camera setup: Multiple
- Running time: 20–23 minutes
- Production company: Truly Original

Original release
- Network: Bravo
- Release: April 26, 2012 – December 29, 2020

Related
- The Real Housewives of Atlanta

Don't Be Tardy... is an American reality television show that premiered on Bravo on April 26, 2012, as Don't Be Tardy for the Wedding. Developed as the first spin-off of The Real Housewives of Atlanta, featuring Kim Zolciak-Biermann, her husband Kroy Biermann and the couple's children, with chef Tracey Bloom and nanny Berta.

In May 2021, it was announced that Don't Be Tardy... had been canceled after eight seasons.

== Background ==
Don't Be Tardy... followed the daily lives of Kim Zolciak, her husband, Kroy Biermann, and their family. The first season was titled Don't Be Tardy for the Wedding, which documented the couple as they prepared for their wedding, as well as the wedding day itself. In November 2012, the series was renewed for a second season, with the series being renamed to its current title. Season 2 premiered on April 16, 2013. The second season encompasses Zolciak as she moves on from The Real Housewives of Atlanta, takes care of her family, constructs her dream home, and manages to live out of the townhouse with the couple's growing family.

Kroy met Kim Zolciak in May 2010 while Zolciak was attending the Dancing Stars of Atlanta charity event to support fellow Real Housewives cast member, Sheree Whitfield. Biermann and Zolciak started dating and, just three months later, Zolciak was pregnant. On May 31, 2011, Zolciak gave birth to son Kroy Jagger Biermann. This was Biermann's first child and Kim's first son. The couple wed at their previous Atlanta home on November 11, 2011. On March 20, 2012, Kim announced via Twitter that she and Kroy were expecting their second child together. On August 15, 2012, they welcomed their second son, Kash Kade Biermann. It was announced on June 5, 2013, that the couple was expecting their third child together. It was then announced on August 19, 2013, that the couple was expecting a set of twins; the twins are the couples' third and fourth children - Zolciak's fifth and sixth. Zolciak announced that she gave birth to her twins on November 25, 2013. The girl is named Kaia Rose in honor of Kroy's niece Kiah and 'Psychic Rose,' who Kim visits throughout her time on The Real Housewives. Her son, Kane Ren, gets his middle name from Zoliciak's OBGYN who has delivered five of her six children.

== Production ==
Bravo announced the third season renewal of Don't Be Tardy... in April 2014. Season 3 premiered on July 17, 2014. The third season features Kim and Kroy's two new twins (a boy and a girl), their first two children together (both boys), and their two teenagers (adopted by Kroy but fathered in previous relationships of Kim's). The four younger children are all under the age of four. Kroy dealt with a football injury that temporarily suspended his football career. The family has moved into their completed 6,500 square-foot home.

In March 2015, Bravo renewed Don't Be Tardy... for a fourth season, which premiered on August 16, 2015. In April 2016, the show was renewed for a fifth season, which premiered on September 14, 2016. In April 2017, the series was renewed for a sixth season, which premiered on October 6, 2017. In April 2018, the series was renewed for a seventh season which premiered on February 17, 2019.

In July 2019, the series was renewed for an eighth season. The season was due to premiere in July 2020, but was pushed to October 6, 2020. On May 7, 2021, Bravo cancelled the show after eight seasons.

== Episodes ==
Don't Be Tardy episodes
Season	Episodes	Originally released	
Season	Episodes	First released	Last released
1	9	April 26, 2012	June 14, 2012
2	12	April 16, 2013	June 25, 2013
3	13	July 17, 2014	September 21, 2014
4	12	August 16, 2015	November 5, 2015
5	12	September 14, 2016	December 14, 2016
6	12	October 6, 2017	December 15, 2017
7	12	February 17, 2019	April 26, 2019
8	13	October 6, 2020	December 29, 2020
