= Hollywood Divas =

US reality television program

- Genre: Reality
- Starring: Paula Jai Parker; Golden Brooks; Countess Vaughn; Lisa Wu; Elise Neal; Malika Haqq
- Opening theme: Hollywood Divas theme
- Composer: Paula Jai Parker
- Country of origin: United States
- No. of seasons: 3
- No. of episodes: 28

Production
- Executive producers: Adam Reed; Leslie Greif; Carlos King; Anthony Sylvester; Todd Tucker
- Running time: 42 minutes
- Production companies: Thinkfactory Media; Kingdom Reign Entertainment

Original release
- Network: TV One
- Release: October 8, 2014 – August 24, 2016

Hollywood Divas is an American reality television series that premiered on October 8, 2014, on TV One cable network. The show chronicles the lives of five African-American actresses. The series highlights the ups and downs of the actresses trying to navigate their career, family and relationships, all while attempting to stay relevant in an unpredictable entertainment industry known for overlooking black talent. The premiere episode was the highest-rated episode ever for a TV One show with 1.2 million viewers, and the most watched episode for any show on the network.

The series premiered on October 8, 2014. On December 18, 2014, TV One picked up the series for a second season, which premiered on July 15, 2015. The third season premiered on July 6, 2016.

== Synopsis ==
The first season focuses on the lives of actresses Paula Jai Parker, Elise Neal, Golden Brooks, Countess Vaughn and producer, former Real Housewives of Atlanta star Lisa Wu. All five ladies get together to write, film and produce their own project called The White Sistas while dealing with drama.

In the second season, more drama unfolds concerning ownership rights of The White Sistas when the ladies try to get a deal for the project. The season ends with a showdown at the reunion with Lisa, Golden and Countess confronting Paula and her husband.

In the third season, Elise departed the show and Malika Haqq joined the cast, befriending Paula and pursuing an acting career. Lisa starts dating and tries to mend things with Paula. Paula gets the part she's been waiting for in Ray Donovan. Countess starts singing again but her friendship with Golden takes a rocky turn. Golden starts a swimsuit line and also receives a dream role that doesn't go well. The end of the season features a fiery reunion battle between Countess and Golden.

- Paula Jai Parker
- Golden Brooks
- Countess Vaughn
- Lisa Wu
- Elise Neal (seasons 1–2)
- Malika Haqq (season 3)

== Episodes ==
Season	Episodes	Originally released	
Season	Episodes	First released	Last released
1	10	October 8, 2014	December 17, 2014
2	10	July 15, 2015	September 16, 2015
3	8	July 6, 2016	August 24, 2016

=== Season 1 (2014) ===
No. overall	No. in season	Title	Original release date
1	1	"Acting is Not a Spectator Sport"	October 8, 2014
2	2	"I Am the Controller of This"	October 15, 2014
3	3	"Baby Steps"	October 22, 2014
4	4	"Five Black Witches?"	October 29, 2014
5	5	"Everybody Loves a Hot Mess"	November 5, 2014
6	6	"Bootygate"	November 12, 2014
7	7	"Who's the Director?"	November 19, 2014
8	8	"That's What a Boss Has to Do Sometimes"	December 3, 2014
9	9	"The Reunion Part One"	December 10, 2014
10	10	"The Reunion Part Two"	December 17, 2014

=== Season 2 (2015) ===
No. overall	No. in season	Title	Original release date	US viewers (millions)
11	1	"Side Eye and Side Deals"	July 15, 2015	0.445
12	2	"Rocking the Boat"	July 22, 2015	0.337
13	3	"Do the Right Thing"	July 29, 2015	0.319
14	4	"A `Forrest' Full of Shade"	August 5, 2015	0.335
15	5	"Damage Control"	August 12, 2015	0.382
16	6	"Heartbreak Hotel"	August 19, 2015	0.305
17	7	"The Sista Is Back!"	August 26, 2015	0.404
18	8	"The End of an Era"	September 2, 2015	0.327
19	9	"The Reunion Part One"	September 9, 2015	0.597
20	10	"The Reunion Part Two"	September 16, 2015	0.435

=== Season 3 (2016) ===
No. overall	No. in season	Title	Original release date	US viewers (millions)
21	1	"Out With the Old, In With the New"	July 6, 2016	0.315
22	2	"Liar, Liar, Pimps on Fire"	July 13, 2016	0.253
23	3	"No Laughing Matter"	July 20, 2016	0.265
24	4	"Bikinis and Backstabbing"	July 27, 2016	0.248
25	5	"Star Tour & Star Wars"	August 3, 2016	0.227
26	6	"Prom-ises"	August 10, 2016	0.298
27	7	"The Reunion Part One"	August 17, 2016	0.268
28	8	"The Reunion Part Two"	August 24, 2016	0.281
