= Google Me (Kim Zolciak song) =

2012 single by Kim Zolciak

Single by Kim Zolciak
- Released: October 5, 2010
- Genre: Pop
- Length: 3:51
- Label: Self-released
- Songwriter(s): Angela Scott

Kim Zolciak singles chronology
"Tardy for the Party" (2009)	"Google Me" (2010)	"Love Me First" (2012)

"Google Me" is the second single by American television personality Kim Zolciak. It was independently released on October 5, 2010, after a preview of the song premiered on Gawker the month prior. A different song by Zolciak, "The Ring Didn't Mean a Thing", was initially to be released instead, but was indefinitely postponed after creative differences with co-writer Kandi Burruss. "Google Me" was written by American singer-songwriter Angela Scott, who had made several appearances on The Real Housewives of Atlanta during Zolciak's tenure on the show.

Musically, "Google Me" is a pop song that received comparisons to songs released by other The Real Housewives cast members. Lyrically, it references the search engine of the same name, and discusses Zolciak's personal life, specifically a former relationship. "Google Me" was negatively received by critics, several of whom provided sarcastic reviews. Zolciak performed it live once during an appearance on Watch What Happens Live with Andy Cohen in November 2010.

== Background and release ==
"Google Me" serves as Kim Zolciak's second single, following the release of "Tardy for the Party" in 2009. A second collaboration with fellow The Real Housewives of Atlanta co-star Kandi Burruss, titled "The Ring Didn't Mean a Thing", was initially slated to serve as her next single, but was ultimately shelved after a series of creative problems occurred between the two, as documented throughout the show's third season. Despite Burruss' on-screen work with these two songs, she did not assist with "Google Me"; instead, Zolciak worked with a musician friend of Burruss. Although Zolciak received a writing credit on "Tardy for the Party", she did not receive one for "Google Me". Virginia-based singer-songwriter Angela Scott penned "Google Me"; she had made several appearances on The Real Housewives of Atlanta, and was eventually approached by Zolciak to discuss potentially working together. According to Scott, Zolciak preferred a different song of hers, but Bravo ultimately felt "Google Me" would be a better fit.

A preview of "Google Me" was first released to Gawker in late September 2010. The song was released to iTunes for digital download and streaming on October 5, 2010. Zolciak told the Hartford Courant she felt more confident in "Google Me" than her debut single, "Tardy for the Party". She later performed the song during an episode of the American late-night talk show Watch What Happens Live with Andy Cohen, on November 21, 2010. Regarding the live performance, Rodney Ho from The Atlanta Journal-Constitution wrote that Zolciak "did not embarrass herself". "Google Me" was removed from digital retailers for a temporary amount of time before being re-released on March 28, 2012, following the release of Zolciak's third single, "Love Me First", that same month.

== Music and lyrics ==
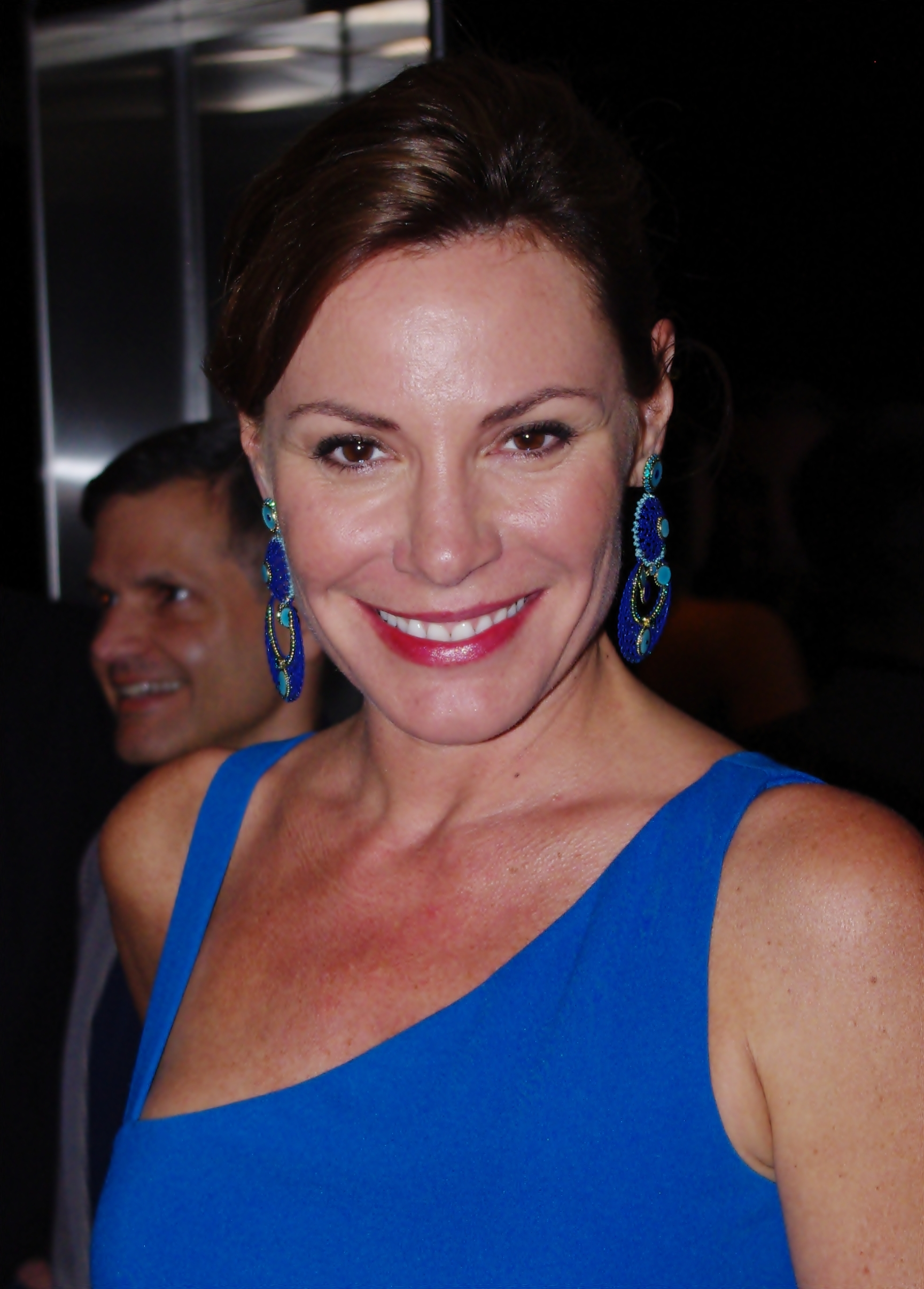
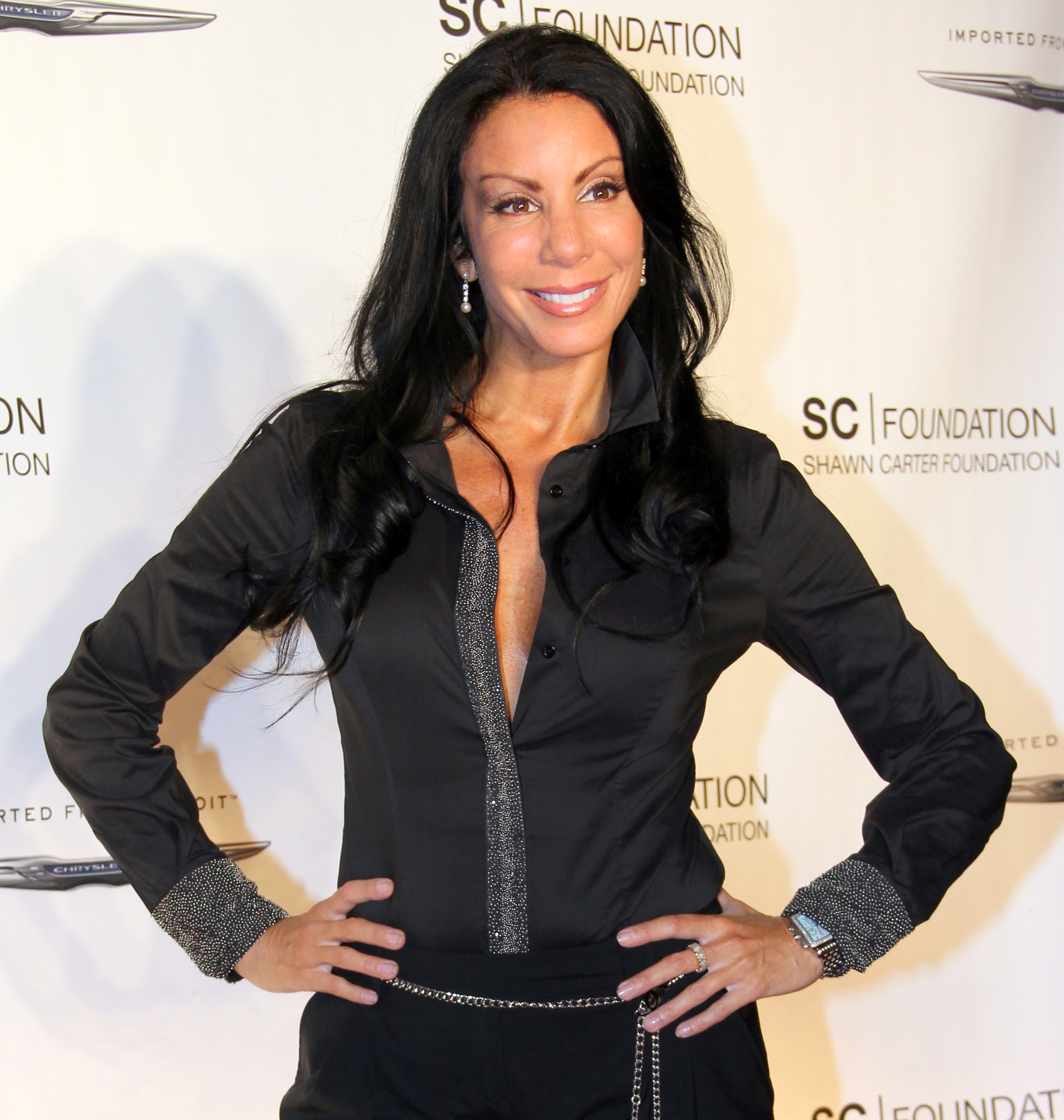
"Google Me" was deemed as being similar to releases by Real Housewives stars Luann de Lesseps and Danielle Staub.

Emily Exton of Entertainment Weekly grouped "Google Me" with pop singles by Real Housewives cast members, such as "Money Can't Buy You Class" by Luann de Lesseps and "Real Close" by Danielle Staub. Zolciak considered "Google Me" a rap song, and compared its energy to that of "Glamorous" (2006) by Fergie. Lyrically, the song discusses her professional and romantic lives, specifically her former relationship with Lee "Big Poppa" Najjar. The refrain consists of the word "Google" being spelt out, in reference to the search engine. Zolciak later clarified the song's meaning, stating she does "Google herself" but the song was about more that this, acknowledging that not everybody would like her. Zolciak felt that focussing on doing what she loved and being able to make money from it was more important to her that what people think of her. Zolciak also noted that song makes reference to Najjar ("Big Poppa"). The lyrics discuss how Zolciak previously considered Najjar and her girls her everything but is now able to "do it for herself" and recognise that she was always able to.

Exton also said that Zolciak's singing style was "talk-sing[ing]" and felt the lyrics summarized "just how fabulous she is". Additionally, she said the lyric "It ain't gonna be easy replacing me / Those other girls, they wanna be like me / But they're just Barbies: all body, no brain / Google my name, I'm doing my thing" hinted at Zolciak's departure from The Real Housewives of Atlanta. She later denied this rumor to TV Guide Magazine.

== Critical reception ==
"Google Me" was negatively received by music critics. Vulture's Edith Zimmerman wrote that with "Google Me", Zolciak gave comedy duo Tim & Eric "a run for their money". Lynsey Eidell of Glamour considered "Google Me" a part of Zolciak's "questionable" musical career. Robbie Daw from Idolator provided a sarcastic review of the song, referring to Zolciak as a "world-changing composer of song" and to the song as a "masterpiece". Exton also provided a humorous review, likening it to "Tardy for the Party", which she called a fluke. In a separate article, she wrote: "lest you forget [...] Ms. Zolciak is amidst the sea of horrifying yet hypnotic Housewives' singles." In a list ranking 25 song releases from The Real Housewives, Sadie Gennis from TV Guide Magazine listed "Google Me" as the seventeenth best, opining that she would rather listen to Zolciak's work with Burruss. People's Dave Quinn ranked "Google Me" at number 31 on his list of 37 best Real Housewives songs, and explained that it was not particularly memorable. Retrospectively, Lanford Beard from the same publication discussed the inclusion of "Google Me" in the 2017 web series Throwback Bravo, which documented popular moments from Bravo series, calling it "lesser known" than Zolciak's "Tardy for the Party".

== Release history ==
Release dates and formats for "Google Me"
Region	Date	Format(s)	Label	Ref.
Various	October 5, 2010	Digital download; streaming	Self-released	
Various	March 28, 2012 (Note: "Google Me" was removed from digital retailers for a temporary amount of time before being re-released on March 28, 2012, following the release of Zolciak's third single, "Love Me First".)	Digital download; streaming	Self-released	
