= Edgerton Hartwell =

American football player (born 1978)

No. 56, 50, 90
- Position: Linebacker

Personal information
- Born: May 27, 1978 (age 48); Las Vegas, Nevada, U.S.
- Listed height: 6 ft 2 in (1.88 m)
- Listed weight: 240 lb (109 kg)

Career information
- High school: Cheyenne (North Las Vegas, Nevada)
- College: Western Illinois
- NFL draft: 2001: 4th round, 126th overall pick

Career history
- Baltimore Ravens (2001–2004); Atlanta Falcons (2005–2006); Cincinnati Bengals (2007)*; Oakland Raiders (2008)*; Las Vegas Locomotives (2010)
- * Offseason or practice squad member only

Awards and highlights
- UFL champion (2010); Buck Buchanan Award (2000)

Career NFL statistics
- Total tackles: 403
- Sacks: 7.0
- Forced fumbles: 3
- Fumble recoveries: 2
- Interceptions: 1
- Stats at Pro Football Reference

Edgerton "Ed" Hartwell II (born May 27, 1978) is an American former professional football player who was a linebacker in the National Football League (NFL). He played college football for Western Illinois Leathernecks and was selected by the Baltimore Ravens in the fourth round of the 2001 NFL draft. Hartwell was also a member of the Atlanta Falcons, Cincinnati Bengals, Oakland Raiders, and Las Vegas Locomotives.

== Early life ==
Hartwell was born in Las Vegas, Nevada, and graduated from Cheyenne High School in 1996. He played college football at University of Wisconsin and Western Illinois University.

== Professional career ==
=== Baltimore Ravens ===
Hartwell was selected by the Baltimore Ravens in the fourth round of the 2001 NFL draft. He played for the Ravens from 2001 to 2004. He never missed a game, though he was limited to special teams in 2001. He finished his career with the Ravens with 337 tackles, six sacks and one interception.

=== Atlanta Falcons ===
After the 2004 season, Hartwell became a free agent and was signed to a six-year, $26.25 million contract by the Atlanta Falcons. He spent two injury-plagued seasons with the Falcons before being released on March 2, 2007. He played in only 13 games recording 63 tackles and one sack.

=== Cincinnati Bengals ===
On May 3, 2007, Hartwell signed with the Cincinnati Bengals. However, he was released on September 1 following the preseason and spent the rest of the year out of football.

=== Oakland Raiders ===
Hartwell signed with the Oakland Raiders on May 2, 2008. He was released by the team on August 13 after the team signed punter Glenn Pakulak.

=== Las Vegas Locomotives ===
Hartwell signed with the Las Vegas Locomotives in 2010.

== NFL career statistics ==
Legend
**Bold**	Career high

=== Regular season ===
Year	Team	Games		Tackles					Interceptions					Fumbles			
Year	Team	GP	GS	Cmb	Solo	Ast	Sck	TFL	Int	Yds	TD	Lng	PD	FF	FR	Yds	TD
2001	BAL	**16**	0	6	6	0	0.0	0	0	0	0	0	0	0	**1**	0	0
2002	BAL	**16**	**16**	**144**	**105**	39	**3.0**	**13**	0	0	0	0	4	0	0	0	0
2003	BAL	**16**	15	94	67	27	**3.0**	7	**1**	**26**	0	**26**	**5**	**1**	0	0	0
2004	BAL	**16**	15	97	56	**41**	0.0	3	0	0	0	0	0	**1**	**1**	-1	0
2005	ATL	5	5	22	16	6	0.0	2	0	0	0	0	1	0	0	0	0
2006	ATL	8	6	40	30	10	1.0	0	0	0	0	0	0	**1**	0	0	0
		77	57	403	280	123	7.0	25	1	26	0	26	10	3	2	-1	0

=== Playoffs ===
Year	Team	Games		Tackles					Interceptions					Fumbles			
Year	Team	GP	GS	Cmb	Solo	Ast	Sck	TFL	Int	Yds	TD	Lng	PD	FF	FR	Yds	TD
2001	BAL	**2**	0	0	0	0	0.0	0	0	0	0	0	0	0	0	0	0
2003	BAL	1	**1**	**10**	**7**	**3**	0.0	**1**	0	0	0	0	0	0	0	0	0
		3	1	10	7	3	0.0	1	0	0	0	0	0	0	0	0	0

== Personal life ==
=== Marriage to Lisa Wu-Hartwell ===
Hartwell married reality television personality Lisa Wu-Hartwell in December 2005. Their son Ed Jr. was born May 9, 2007. Lisa also has sons Jordan (b. 1995) and Justin (b. 1998) with ex-husband R&B singer Keith Sweat.

Court records show that Lisa Wu-Hartwell and Ed Hartwell borrowed $2.9 million to buy their suburban mansion in June 2007. Just over two years later, Bank of America paid $1.9 million for the house at a foreclosure sale at the Forsyth County, Georgia courthouse, after the Hartwells defaulted on their adjustable-rate mortgage from the bank.

Ed Hartwell filed for divorce on August 24, 2011; it was finalized October 7, 2011, with the court document giving her name as Sharon Millette Hartwell.

=== Marriage to Keshia Knight Pulliam ===
On New Year's Day 2016, Hartwell married actress Keshia Knight Pulliam. On July 17, 2016, Knight Pulliam announced that she was expecting her first child, a girl, with husband Ed Hartwell. Hartwell filed for divorce on July 25, 2016. Their daughter, Ella Grace Hartwell, was born on January 23, 2017. The divorce was finalized in April 2018, with Knight Pulliam receiving primary custody of Ella while Hartwell was ordered to pay child support of about $3,000 a month.

== Media appearances ==
Hartwell is featured in seasons 1 and 2 of The Real Housewives of Atlanta, a Bravo TV reality show that follows the life of the Hartwells and several other Housewives and their families. Lisa and Ed Hartwell had several aspiring businesses such as a real estate firm called Hartwell and Associates, a jewelry line called Wu Girls, a t-shirt line called Hart 2 Hart Clothing, a women's clothing line called Closet Freak, and a baby clothing line called Hart 2 Hart Baby.
