= Tardy for the Party =

2009 single by Kim Zolciak

Single by Kim Zolciak
- Released: September 1, 2009
- Genre: Dance-pop; electropop
- Length: 2:44
- Songwriters: Brandon Joel Bowles; Kandi Burruss; Darnell Richard; Kim Zolciak
- Producer: Brandon "Blade" Bowles

Kim Zolciak singles chronology
"Tardy for the Party" (2009)	"Google Me" (2010)

"Tardy for the Party" is a song by American television personality Kim Zolciak; it was independently released on September 1, 2009. The track was written and produced by her The Real Housewives of Atlanta castmate Kandi Burruss, with additional lyrical contributions from Zolciak, Brandon Joel Bowles, and Darnell Richard.

== Background and composition ==
"Tardy for the Party"
A 15-second sample of "Tardy for the Party" by Kim Zolciak, in which the chorus is heard.

"Tardy for the Party" was written by Kandi Burruss, Zolciak, Brandon Joel Bowles, and Darnell Richard, and was produced solely by Burruss. Zolciak claimed that her daughter Brielle drafted the original lyrics when she was 9 years old, which were later reworked by Burruss during formal recording sessions. The production of "Tardy for the Party" was documented on the second season of the reality television series The Real Housewives of Atlanta, in which Zolciak and Burruss are featured. After Zolciak requested that the track be a duet with fellow housewife NeNe Leakes, Burruss began making arrangements for the women to record together. However, the song ultimately became a solo performance by Zolciak, placing a strain on Leakes' friendships with her and Burruss.

== Reception ==
In October 2009, Nielsen Soundscan reported that "Tardy for the Party" had sold approximately 29,000 digital downloads, while Mediabase revealed that the track had been played six times on radio stations. In September 2011, The Hollywood Reporter noted that the song had moved 101,000 copies since its premiere, with illegal downloads increasing ownership of the track to over one million individuals.

== Live performances ==
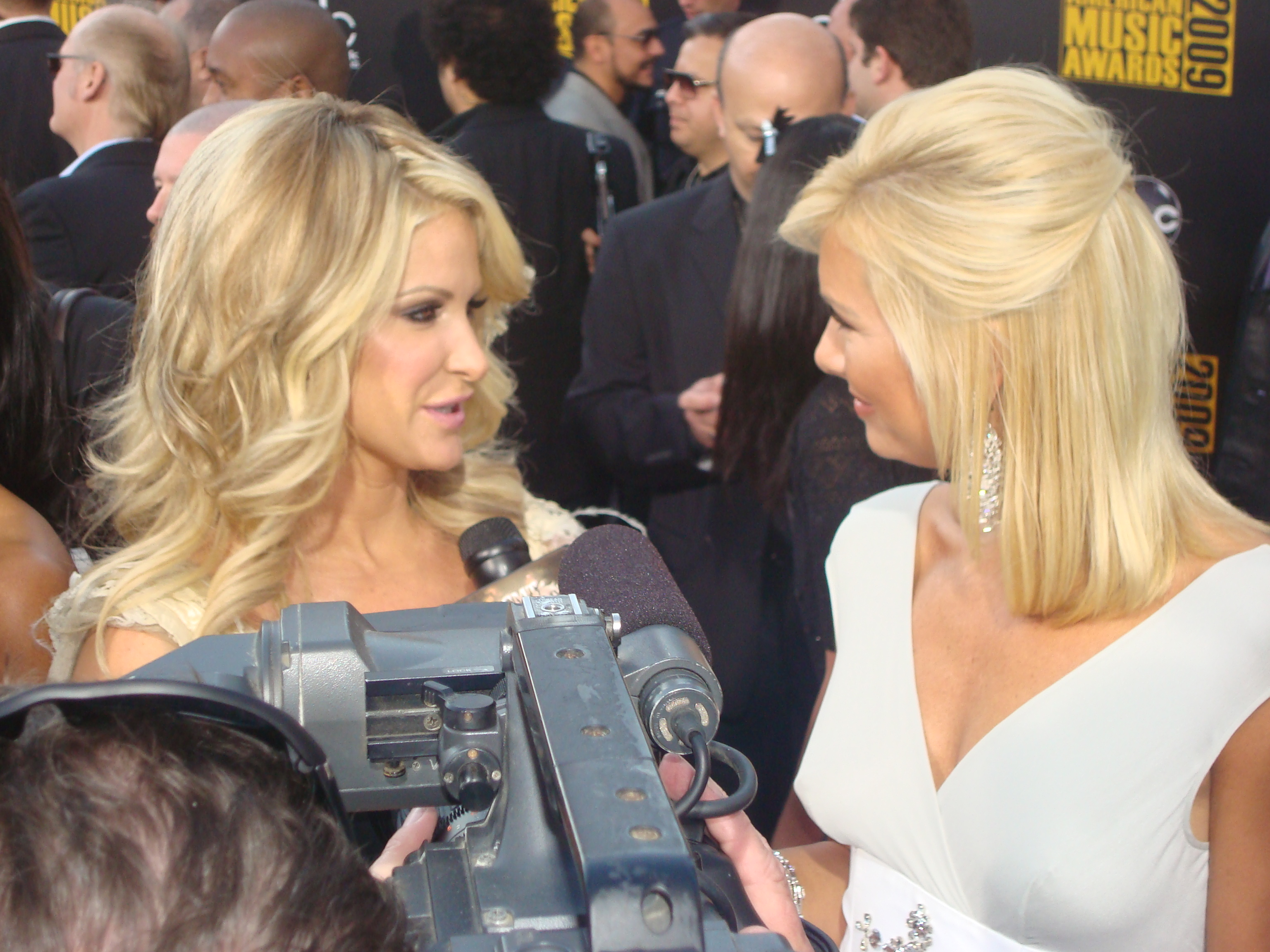
Zolciak (left) at the American Music Awards of 2009

Zolciak first performed "Tardy for the Party" during the reunion for the second season of The Real Housewives of Atlanta, broadcast by Bravo on November 5, 2009. Dressed in black leggings and leather boots, Zolciak was accompanied by two female backup dancers, and encouraged her fellow housewives Leakes, Sheree Whitfield, and Lisa Wu-Hartwell to "c'mon bitches" in the midst of the performance. During the bridge of the song through the end of the recording, Zolciak was joined onstage by Burruss. Donald Deane from The Huffington Post characterized the segment as an "assault to the senses", while Brian Moylan from Gawker Media labeled it "the scariest thing to happen on television" since Britney Spears' performance of "Gimme More" at the 2007 MTV Video Music Awards. Zolciak later sang "Tardy for the Party" on February 26, 2010, at the Gold Room in Atlanta and during an April 9, 2010 appearance on The Wendy Williams Show.

== Lawsuit ==
Since 2010, Burruss has claimed that Zolciak withheld payment for her services during production of "Tardy for the Party". The ensuing conflict between the women became a central plotline during the third and fourth seasons of The Real Housewives of Atlanta, which appeared to have been resolved during a season 4 reunion episode. However, Burruss filed a lawsuit against Zolciak on March 14, 2013, coincidentally the same day that the fifth season reunion was filmed. Burruss was represented by fellow housewife Phaedra Parks, and alleged that Zolciak made profit from the track "without [the] plaintiffs' authorization, license or consent." The lawsuit was dismissed on October 12, 2013, after the presiding judge deemed that Burruss failed to furnish enough evidence of copyright infringement.

== Track listing ==
"Tardy for the Party" – Digital download
No.	Title	Writer(s)	Producer(s)	Length
1.	"Tardy for the Party"	Brandon Joel Bowles; Kandi Burruss; Darnell Richard; Kim Zolciak	Kandi Burruss	2:44
Total length:				2:44

"Tardy for the Party" – Remix EP
No.	Title	Length
1.	"Tardy for the Party"	2:46
2.	"Tardy for the Party" (Tracy Young's Don't Be Tardy Radio Mix)	4:01
3.	"Tardy for the Party" (Tracy Young's Don't Be Tardy Club)	10:09
4.	"Tardy for the Party" (Tracy Young's Don't Be Tardy Mix Show)	7:54
5.	"Tardy for the Party" (Tracy Young's Don't Be Tardy Dub)	8:52
Total length:		33:42

== Charts ==
Chart performance for "Tardy for the Party"
Chart (2009)	Peak position
US Heatseekers Songs (Billboard)	44

== Release history ==
"Tardy for the Party" release formats
Country	Date	Version	Format	Label	Ref.
United States	September 1, 2009	Single version	Digital download	—N/a	
United States	February 9, 2010	Remix EP	Digital download	Ferosh	
