= Lisa Wu =

American actress

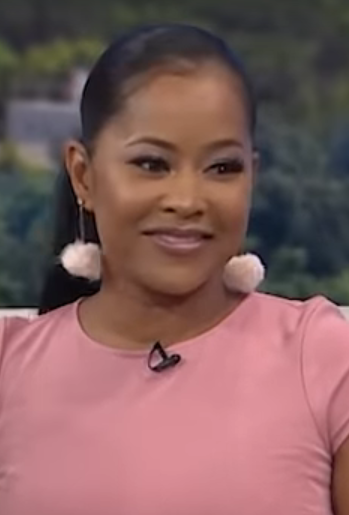
- Wu in 2019
- Born: Inglewood, California, U.S.
- Other names: Sharon Millette Hartwell; Lisa Wu-Hartwell
- Occupations: Television personality; actress; realtor; screenwriter; designer
- Years active: 1992–present
- Known for: The Real Housewives of Atlanta; Hollywood Divas
- Spouses: Keith Sweat (m. 1992; div. 2002) Ed Hartwell (m. 2005; div. 2011)
- Children: 3

Lisa Wu is an American television personality, actress, realtor, screenwriter and designer. She is best known for appearing on reality series The Real Housewives of Atlanta and Hollywood Divas.

== Early life ==
Wu was born and raised in Inglewood, California as one of nine children. Her father, Stanley Wu, is a first-generation Chinese-American and her mother, Victoria Brislis-Wu, was of Afro-Caribbean descent. She has said that her family was often the target of discriminatory comments in their neighborhood.

== Career ==
Wu started her career as a backup dancer for musical artists and bands such as Public Enemy, EPMD, and Candyman. Shortly after this, she joined the rap group 9tene. After leaving music, Wu wrote, produced, and acted in the film Black Ball (2003). She remained in the film industry for many years as a screenwriter, producer, and an actress.

Wu was cast in the inaugural season of Bravo's The Real Housewives of Atlanta. She appeared in the main cast for the first two seasons (2008–09) and was a guest for the third season (2010–11). She made additional guest appearances in the ninth, tenth, fourteenth and fifteenth seasons.

Wu is the author of a novel called When The Cake is Made. The novel was published in 2010 following her departure from RHOA.

Since her departure from RHOA, Wu has continued her career as an actress and producer. From 2014 until 2016, she was a cast member with four other actresses working on a short film, The White Sistas, on the TV One series Hollywood Divas.

== Personal life ==
One of nine children, Wu's elder brother, Meho, is deceased, and Wu was seen grieving over his death in a Season 2 episode of RHOA, during the build-up to an anniversary of his death.

From 1992 until 2002, Wu was married to singer Keith Sweat. The couple have two sons, Jordan (b. 1995) and Justin (b. 1998).

In 2005, Wu married former NFL player Ed Hartwell, and the couple had one son, Ed, Jr. Ed Hartwell filed for divorce on August 24, 2011; it was finalized October 7, 2011, with the court document listing her name as Sharon Millette Hartwell.

== Filmography ==
=== Film ===
Year	Title	Role	Notes
2003	Black Ball	Sharon	
2013	The Internship	Jeggins	
2013	At Mamu's Feet	Jalisa	
2014	Envy or Greed	Adrienne Connell	Short
2014	First Impression	Katrinah	TV movie
2014	Atlanta (ATL) Undercover	Actress	
2016	Definitely Divorcing	Valerie	
2016	Billy Lynn's Long Halftime Walk	Lisa	
2017	The White Sistas	Gabriella White	
2017	Providence Island	Louisa	
2019	Professor Mack	Rosalyn Mack	
2019	London Mitchell's Christmas	Mercedes Mitchell	
2020	Stolen Lilies	Mrs. Lacey	
2020	Pinch	Detective Marsh	
2021	Envision	-	
2021	Letters from the Bottle	Blue Lady	
2022	Rift	Supervisory Agent Greene	

=== Television ===
Year	Title	Role	Notes
2008–2010, 2022–2023	The Real Housewives of Atlanta	Herself	Main cast: seasons 1-2, Guest: seasons 3, 9, 10, 14 & 15 (32 Episodes)
2010	Who Wants to Be a Millionaire	Herself	Episode: "The Real Housewives of Millionaire 5"
2010	Meet the Browns	Jenny	Episode: "Meet the Stepdaughter"
2014–2016	Hollywood Divas	Herself	Main; 10 Episodes
2015	Love & Hip Hop Atlanta: After Party Live!	Herself	Episode: "After Party Live! 414"
2015	Born Again Virgin	Lisa	Episode: "Go Hard or Go Home"
2016	Nubbin & Friends	Lena Chick	Episode: "The Letter "A""
2019	Last Call	Miranda	Episode: "Stupid Cupid"
2021	Saints & Sinners	Felicia Thompson	Recurring cast: season 5
2022	Tales	Jameela	Episode: "Murder She Wrote"
2026	Wealthy Wives of LA	Herself	Main
2026	The Real Housewives Ultimate Girls Trip	Herself	Guest; 1 Episode
