= Kim Zolciak =

American television personality (born 1978)

Kim Zolciak-Biermann
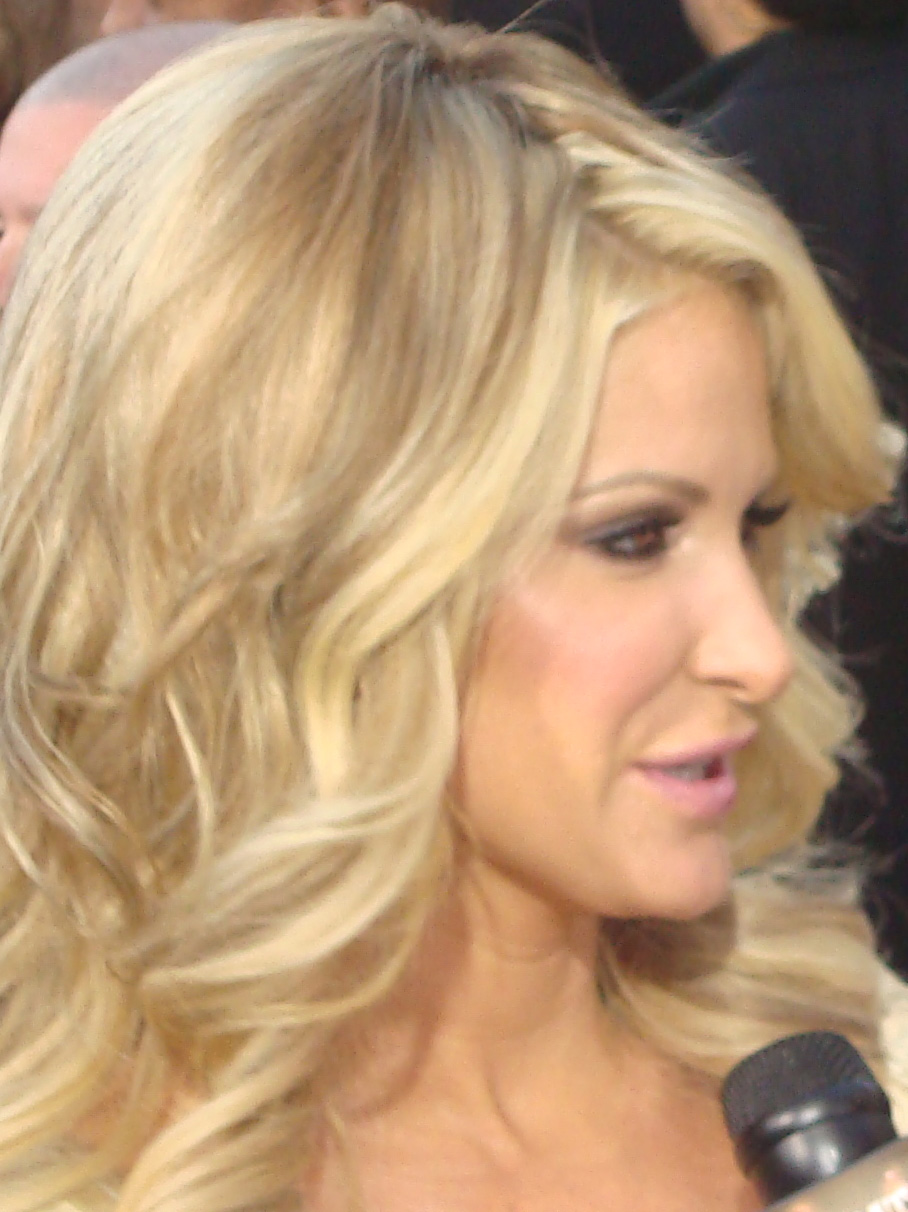
- Zolciak in 2009
- Born: Kimberleigh Marie Zolciak; May 19, 1978 (age 48); Pensacola, Florida, U.S.
- Occupation: Television personality
- Years active: 2008–present
- Television: The Real Housewives of Atlanta; Don't Be Tardy...
- Spouses: Daniel Toce (m. 2001; div. 2003) Kroy Biermann (m. 2011; sep. 2023)
- Children: 6, including Ariana Biermann

Kimberleigh Marie Zolciak-Biermann (née Zolciak; born May 19, 1978) is an American television personality. She is best known as an original cast member of the Bravo reality television series The Real Housewives of Atlanta, starring in five and recurring in one of the 17 seasons since its 2008 premiere. Her spin-off series Don't Be Tardy (originally Don't Be Tardy for the Wedding) aired for eight seasons from 2012–2020.

In 2015, Zolciak was one of the contestants on season 21 of the dancing competition series Dancing with the Stars. She withdrew from the competition on September 15, 2015, finishing in 11th place.

== Early life ==
Zolciak was born in Pensacola, Florida, to a military family, and grew up in Windsor Locks, Connecticut. Her parents are Joseph and Karen, and she has a brother. She is of Polish and Italian descent and was raised Roman Catholic.

In 1995, a 49-year-old Windsor Locks police sergeant had sex with Zolciak, then age 17, after interviewing her as a material witness in a criminal investigation, initially resulting in the officer's firing. The termination was later changed to a 45-day suspension without pay, and then two years later, the officer was forced to retire. He died in 2019.

Zolciak attended East Catholic High School in Manchester, Connecticut, leaving after her freshman year. She studied nursing at the University of Connecticut. At age 21, she moved to Atlanta, Georgia, where her parents had moved, and eventually settled in the suburb of Johns Creek.

== Career ==
=== Entertainment ===
Zolciak first appeared on the reality television series The Real Housewives of Atlanta, airing on Bravo, on October 7, 2008, when she was 30. Between seasons four and five, Zolciak and her then fiancé were the subject of a spinoff show, Don't Be Tardy for the Wedding, chronicling Zolciak's wedding preparations. Zolciak left Real Housewives in the middle of the fifth season, with her final episode airing December 9, 2012. Don't Be Tardy for the Wedding, later renamed to Don't Be Tardy..., is in its eighth season as of 2020. Zolciak returned to Real Housewives for its tenth season in a recurring capacity.

Zolciak was scheduled to star in a new reality show on Bravo with fellow The Real Housewives cast member, NeNe Leakes, called NeNe and Kim: The Road to Riches. However, the network later decided not to move forward with the show.

Zolciak competed on the 21st season of the dancing competition show Dancing with the Stars. She was paired with professional dancer Tony Dovolani. She withdrew in September 2015, three weeks into the competition, because of a transient ischemic attack, which prevented her from air travel.

In 2023, Zolciak was revealed as one of the cast members to be joining The Surreal Life on MTV for the show's eighth season, which premiered on July 23, 2024.

=== Musical career ===
In 2008, Zolciak began work on a country music album. She released a debut single, the dance track "Tardy for the Party", in 2009, followed by a remix EP the following year.

On March 12, 2013, Zolciak's Real Housewives of Atlanta castmate Kandi Burruss and her collaborating songwriter/producer Rodney "Don Vito" Richard filed suit against Zolciak for profits earned from "Tardy for the Party". In the documents filed, Burruss' attorney, RHOA castmate Phaedra Parks, alleges her clients wrote the song for Zolciak and that Zolciak released and sold the single "without [the] plaintiffs' authorization, license or consent." Burruss was also seeking a temporary restraining order to prevent future sales of the song and the "destruction of all copies of the infringing single and any other product of defendant's that infringe plaintiffs' copyrights", punitive damages, attorney's fees, and a jury trial.

=== Business ===
In May 2016, Zolciak launched a line of skin-care products called Kashmere Kollection. Zolciak has also released a fragrance called Kashmere.

== Personal life ==
Zolciak has a daughter from a previous relationship. She married Daniel Toce in 2001, and that year they had a daughter named Ariana Lenee. The couple divorced in February 2003.

In May 2010, Zolciak met Atlanta Falcons football player Kroy Biermann at the charity event Dancing with Atlanta Stars. Their meeting was later shown on season three of The Real Housewives of Atlanta. The couple wed at their Roswell, Georgia, home on November 11, 2011. They have four children including Kroy Jagger "KJ" who was born in May 2011.

In March 2013, Biermann filed to adopt Zolciak's daughters. In July 2013, the adoption became final, and the girls subsequently changed their last names to Biermann.

In May 2023, Biermann filed for divorce from Zolciak after eleven and a half years of marriage, citing their date of separation as April 30. In July 2023, it was confirmed that Zolciak and Biermann had withdrawn their divorce filings. In August 2023, Biermann filed for divorce a second time.

On September 3, 2026, 15–year–old KJ was indicted on seven felony charges, including one count each of aggravated child molestation, aggravated sexual battery, aggravated sodomy, and false imprisonment, and three counts of aggravated sexual battery against a child under 16. The charges relate to an alleged sexual assault on a fourteen year old classmate from April 2026 in an Alpharetta gym. On September 11, 2026, he was granted a $200,000 bond that included house arrest, wearing a GPS ankle monitor, surrendering his passport to his attorney, completing his schooling virtually, prohibition from using cell phones or posting on social media, and being barred from having any contact with the alleged victim. His attorney filed a motion to move the case to juvenile court, which motion the district attorney opposed including due a KJ's prior history. Prior to the latest charges, KJ had been placed under court supervision in October 2025 for allegedly filming himself sexually assaulting a family member under 12 years of age.

== Discography ==
=== Singles ===
| Year | Single |
|---|---|
| 2009 | "Tardy for the Party" |
| 2010 | "Google Me" |
| 2012 | "Love Me First" |
| 2018 | "Wig (Wish I Gave a S**t)" |
