= 2026 Chicago Bears season =

107th season in franchise history

- Owner: George McCaskey
- General manager: Ryan Poles
- President: Kevin Warren
- Head coach: Ben Johnson
- Offensive coordinator: Press Taylor
- Defensive coordinator: Dennis Allen
- Home stadium: Soldier Field

Results
- Record: 8–2
- Division place: 3rd NFC North

Uniform
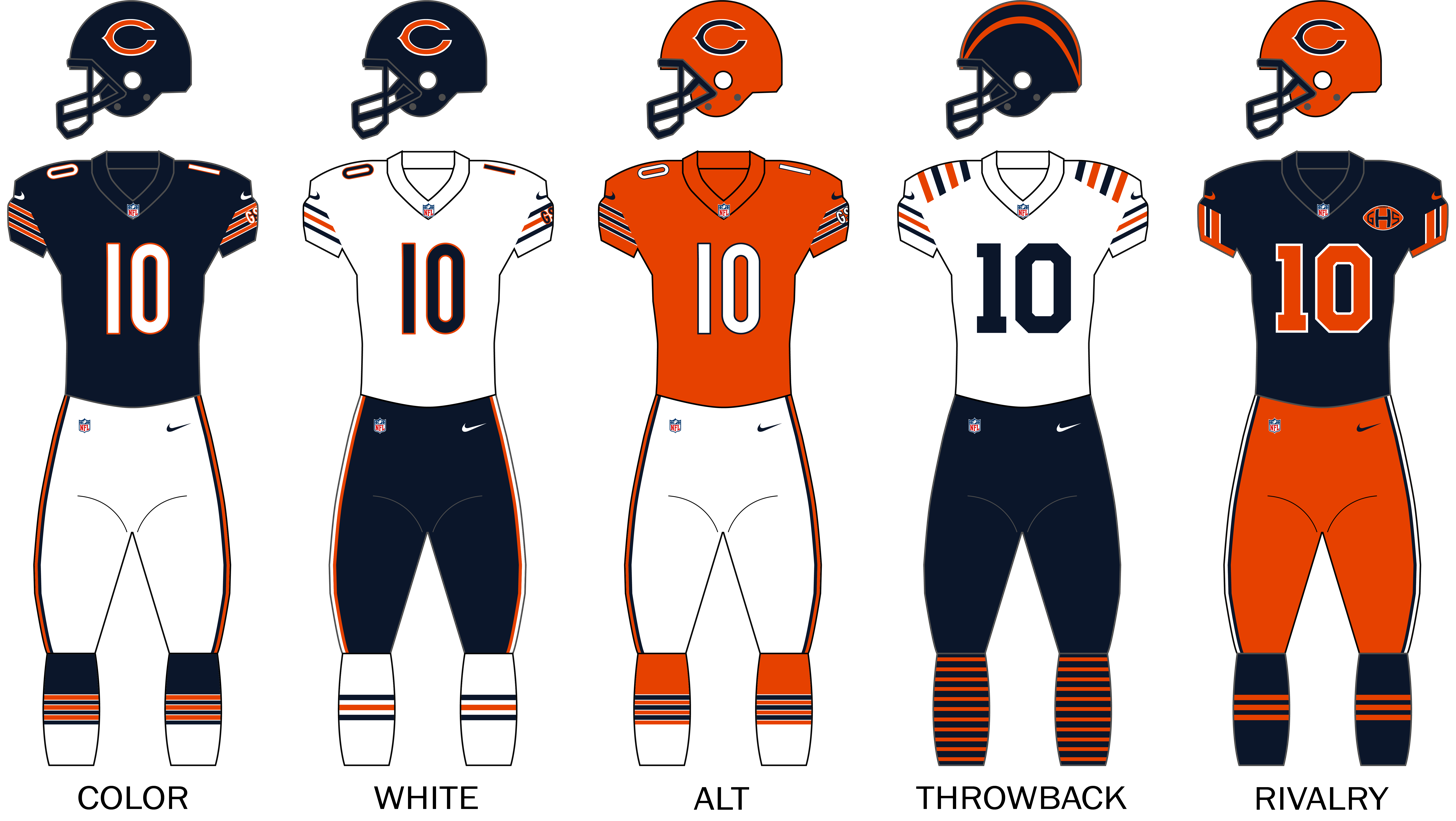

The 2026 season is the Chicago Bears' 107th in the National Football League (NFL), their fifth under the leadership of general manager Ryan Poles and their second under head coach Ben Johnson. The Bears will seek to improve upon their 11–6 record from the previous season and repeat as NFC North champions for the first time since 2005–2006.

With their Week 9 win over the Tampa Bay Buccaneers, the Bears started 7–2 for the first time since 2012.

== Offseason ==
=== Roster changes ===
==== Free agents ====
Position	Player	Tag	2026 team	Date signed	Contract	Source
C	Ryan Bates	UFA				
SS	Jaquan Brisker	UFA	Pittsburgh Steelers	March 12, 2026	1 year, $5.5 million	
FS	Kevin Byard	UFA	New England Patriots	March 11, 2026	1 year, $9 million	
DT	Andrew Billings	UFA	Arizona Cardinals	March 16, 2026	1 year, $2.4 million	
LS	Scott Daly	UFA	Chicago Bears	September 22, 2026	1 year, $2.1 million	
WR	Devin Duvernay	UFA	Arizona Cardinals	March 15, 2026	1 year, $2.5 million	
FS	C. J. Gardner-Johnson	UFA	Buffalo Bills	March 12, 2026	1 year, $6 million	
SS	Elijah Hicks	UFA	Chicago Bears	March 12, 2026		
RB	Travis Homer	UFA				
MLB	D'Marco Jackson	UFA	Chicago Bears	March 11, 2026	2 year, $7.5 million	
LT	Braxton Jones	UFA	Chicago Bears	March 11, 2026	1 year, $10 million	
CB	Jaylon Jones	UFA	Chicago Bears	March 13, 2026		
QB	Case Keenum	UFA	Chicago Bears	March 11, 2026	2 year, $5.5 million	
CB	Nick McCloud	UFA				
SS	Jonathan Owens	UFA	Indianapolis Colts	March 17, 2026	1 year, $1.4 million	
MLB	Jalen Reeves-Maybin	UFA				
DE	Dominique Robinson	UFA				
TE	Durham Smythe	UFA	Baltimore Ravens	March 12, 2026	1 year, $3 million	
DE	Joe Tryon-Shoyinka	UFA				
DT	Chris Williams	UFA				
CB	Nahshon Wright	UFA	New York Jets	March 11, 2026	1 year, $5.5 million	
WR	Olamide Zaccheaus	UFA	Atlanta Falcons	March 11, 2026	2 year, $4.5 million	
DE	Daniel Hardy	RFA	Chicago Bears	March 11, 2026	2 year, $4.97 million	
G	Jordan McFadden	RFA	Chicago Bears	March 12, 2026	1 year, $1.3 million	
LT	Theo Benedet	ERFA	Chicago Bears	March 11, 2026	1 year, $1 million	
RFA: Restricted free agent, UFA: Unrestricted free agent, ERFA: Exclusive-rights free agent Legend – Light green background indicates a player has been re-signed by the Bears. – Light red background indicates a player has departed the Bears.

==== Signings ====
Position	Player	Previous team	Date signed	Contract	Source
S	Coby Bryant	Seattle Seahawks	March 11, 2026	3 year, $40 million	
LB	Devin Bush	Cleveland Browns	March 11, 2026	3 year, $30 million	
DT	Neville Gallimore	Indianapolis Colts	March 11, 2026	2 year, $12 million	
WR	Kalif Raymond	Detroit Lions	March 11, 2026	1 year, $5.1 million	
OT	Jedrick Wills	Cleveland Browns	March 12, 2026	1 year, $1.2 million	
CB	Cam Lewis	Buffalo Bills	March 13, 2026	2 year, $6 million	
DT	Kentavius Street	Atlanta Falcons	March 13, 2026	1 year, $1.5 million	

==== Trades ====
Position	Arrived	From	Date of trade	Departed
WR	2026 2nd-round pick	Buffalo Bills	March 11, 2026	D. J. Moore; 2026 5th-round pick
C	Garrett Bradbury	New England Patriots	March 11, 2026	2027 5th-round pick
DT	Jeffery Simmons; 2028 5th-round pick	Tennessee Titans	October 29, 2026	2027 1st-round pick 2028 1st-round pick 2027 4th-round pick

==== Reserve/future contracts ====
The Bears signed the following players to reserve/future contracts: Maurice Alexander (WR), Brittain Brown (RB), Stephen Carlson (TE), Luke Elkin (LS), Dallis Flowers (CB), Jonathan Garvin (DE), Dominique Hampton (OLB), Kyle Hergel (G), Qadir Ismail (TE), Nikola Kalinic (TE), Jamree Kromah (DE), Dontae Manning (CB), Jeremiah Martin (DE), Gervarrius Owens (S), JP Richardson (WR), and Nephi Sewell (OLB).

== Draft ==
2026 Chicago Bears draft selections
Round	Selection	Player	Position	College	Notes
1	25	Dillon Thieneman	S	Oregon	
2	57	Logan Jones	C	Iowa	
2	60	Traded to the Tennessee Titans			From Bills (Note: The Bears traded a fifth-round selection (165th overall) and WR D. J. Moore to Buffalo in exchange for a second-round selection (60th overall).)
3	69	Sam Roush	TE	Stanford	From Titans
3	89	Zavion Thomas	WR	LSU	
4	125	Traded to the Kansas City Chiefs			
4	124	Malik Muhammad	CB	Texas	From Jaguars via Panthers
4	129	Traded to the Carolina Panthers			From Rams
5	144	Traded to the Carolina Panthers			From Titans via Rams and Titans
5	165	Traded to the Buffalo Bills			
5	166	Keyshaun Elliott	LB	Arizona St.	
6	206	Traded to the Cleveland Browns (Note: The Bears traded a sixth-round selection (209th overall) to Cleveland in exchange for a seventh-round pick (239th overall) and DE Joe Tryon-Shoyinka.)			
6	213	Jordan van den Berg	DT	Georgia Tech	From Seahawks via Jaguars, Lions and Bills
7	239	Traded to the Buffalo Bills			From Eagles via Jaguars and Browns
7	241	Traded to the Buffalo Bills			

Notes

2026 Chicago Bears undrafted free agents
Name	Position	College	Ref.
Caden Barnett	OL	Wyoming	
Coleman Bennett	RB	Kennesaw State	
KC Eziomume	DB	Tulane	
Beau Gardner	LS	Georgia	
Kyron Hudson	WR	Penn State	
Omari Kelly	WR	Michigan State	
Jaren Kump	OL	Utah	
Hayden Large	TE	Iowa	
Jayden Loving	DL	Wake Forest	
Wayne Matthews	OLB	Michigan State	
Miller Moss	QB	Louisville	
Mason Murphy	OL	Auburn	
Gabriel Plascencia	PK	San Diego State	
Skyler Thomas	DB	Oregon State	
Squirrel White	WR	Florida State	

== Staff ==
Chicago Bears staff
Front office: Chairman – George McCaskey; President/CEO – Kevin Warren; General manager – Ryan Poles; Assistant general manager – Jeff King; Vice president of football administration – Matt Feinstein; Senior director of player personnel – Trey Koziol; Director of player personnel – Breck Ackley; Assistant director of college scouting – Francis St. Paul; Director of pro scouting – DJ Hord; Football administration and analytics manager – Andrea Wright; Head coaches: Head coach – Ben Johnson; Assistant head coach/wide receivers – Antwaan Randle El; Offensive coaches: Offensive coordinator – Press Taylor; Quarterbacks – J. T. Barrett; Running backs – Eric Studesville; Tight ends – Jim Dray; Offensive line – Dan Roushar; Assistant offensive line – Kyle DeVan; Offensive analyst – Will Lawing; Offensive assistant - quarterbacks & tight ends – Robbie Picazo; Offensive quality control – Matt Aponte; Offensive quality control – Isaiah Ford	Defensive coaches: Defensive coordinator – Dennis Allen; Defensive line – Jeremy Garrett; Linebackers – Richard Smith; Assistant linebackers – Kevin Koch; Defensive backs/passing game coordinator – Al Harris; Assistant defensive backs/safeties – Matt Giordano; Senior defensive assistant – Bill Johnson; Defensive assistant/nickels – Cannon Matthews; Defensive quality control – Zach Cable; Defensive quality control – Kenny Norton III; Special teams coaches: Special teams coordinator – Richard Hightower; Assistant special teams – Anthony Blevins; Coaching administration: Senior director of coaching operations – Justin Rudd; Manager of coaching administration – Chavis Cook; Director of research and analysis – Harrison Freid; Strength and conditioning: Head strength and conditioning – Pierre Ngo; Assistant strength and conditioning – Allison Haley; Assistant strength and conditioning – Noble Landry; Assistant strength and conditioning – Reshard Langford; Assistant strength and conditioning – Mark Philippi; → Coaching staff → Front office → More NFL staffs

== Current roster ==
Chicago Bears roster
Quarterbacks (QB): 17 Tyson Bagent; 11 Case Keenum; 18 Caleb Williams; Running backs (RB): 23 Roschon Johnson; 25 Kyle Monangai; 4 D'Andre Swift; Wide receivers (WR): 10 Luther Burden III; 15 Rome Odunze; 14 Kalif Raymond; 13 Zavion Thomas; 9 Jahdae Walker; Tight ends (TE): 88 Stephen Carlson; 84 Colston Loveland; 87 Sam Roush	Offensive linemen (OL): 79 Theo Benedet T; 67 Garrett Bradbury C; 73 Jonah Jackson G; 54 Logan Jones C; 74 Jordan McFadden G; 65 Luke Newman G; 62 Joe Thuney G; 75 Ozzy Trapilo T; 58 Darnell Wright T; Defensive linemen (DL): 94 Austin Booker DE; 90 Neville Gallimore DT; 92 Daniel Hardy DE; 50 Grady Jarrett DT; 91 Jayden Loving DT; 97 James Lynch DT; 99 Jeffery Simmons DT; 98 Montez Sweat DE; 95 Shemar Turner DT; 96 Jordan van den Berg DT	Linebackers (LB): 12 Devin Bush Jr.; 53 T. J. Edwards; 49 Keyshaun Elliott; 48 D'Marco Jackson; 57 Jack Sanborn; 44 Noah Sewell; Defensive backs (DB): 39 Josh Blackwell CB; 6 Kyler Gordon CB; 22 Elijah Hicks S; 1 Jaylon Johnson CB; 21 Cam Lewis S; 24 Malik Muhammad CB; 20 Clark Phillips III CB; 29 Tyrique Stevenson CB; 31 Dillon Thieneman S; 38 Skyler Thomas S; Special teams (ST): 46 Scott Daly LS; 8 Cairo Santos K; 19 Tory Taylor P	Practice squad: 36 Salvon Ahmed RB; 76 Caden Barnett G; 68 Earnest Brown IV DT; 26 Josh Butler CB; 81 Kaden Davis WR; 32 KC Eziomume CB; 45 Beau Gardner LS; 80 Qadir Ismail TE; 47 Buddy Johnson LB; 72 Christian Jones T; 37 Elijah Jones CB; 35 Wayne Matthews LB; 82 Scotty Miller WR; 16 Miller Moss QB; 83 JP Richardson WR; 33 Keidron Smith S; Reserve: 38 Brittain Brown RB (IR); 2 Coby Bryant S (IR); 43 Tony Fields II LB (IR); 70 Braxton Jones T (IR); 86 Nikola Kalinic TE (IR); 85 Cole Kmet TE (IR); 43 Hayden Large TE (IR); 55 Dayo Odeyingbo DE (IR); 30 Zavier Scott RB (IR); 46 Nephi Sewell LB (IR); 93 Kentavius Street DT (IR) 52 active, 16 practice squad, 11 reserve As of November 5, 2026. Rookies in italics.; Roster; Depth chart; Transactions

== Preseason ==
Week	Date	Opponent	Result	Record	Venue	Recap
1	August 15	Cleveland Browns	W 34–10	1–0	Soldier Field	Recap
2	August 22	at Cincinnati Bengals	L 9–27	1–1	Paycor Stadium	Recap
3	August 29	at Tennessee Titans	W 24–15	2–1	Nissan Stadium	Recap

== Regular season ==
=== Schedule ===
Week	Date	Time (CT)	Opponent	Result	Record	Venue	Network	Recap
1	September 13	12:00 p.m.	at Carolina Panthers	**W** 59–37	1–0	Bank of America Stadium	Fox	Recap
2	September 20	12:00 p.m.	**Minnesota Vikings**	**L** 3–9	1–1	Soldier Field	Fox	Recap
3	September 28	7:15 p.m.	Philadelphia Eagles	**W** 27–7	2–1	Soldier Field	ESPN/ABC	Recap
4	October 4	12:00 p.m.	New York Jets	**W** 23–12	3–1	Soldier Field	Fox	Recap
5	October 11	12:00 p.m.	at **Green Bay Packers**	**L** 7–31	3–2	Lambeau Field	Fox	Recap
6	October 18	12:00 p.m.	at Atlanta Falcons	**W** 31–23	4–2	Mercedes-Benz Stadium	Fox	Recap
7	October 22	7:15 p.m.	New England Patriots	**W** 30–24	5–2	Soldier Field	Prime Video	Recap
8	November 2	7:15 p.m.	at Seattle Seahawks	**W** 34–17	6–2	Lumen Field	ESPN	Recap
9	November 8	7:20 p.m.	Tampa Bay Buccaneers	**W** 27–24	7–2	Soldier Field	NBC	Recap
10	Bye							
11	November 22	12:00 p.m.	New Orleans Saints	**W** 21–13	8–2	Soldier Field	Fox	Recap
12	November 26	12:00 p.m.	at **Detroit Lions**			Ford Field	CBS	
13	December 6	12:00 p.m.	Jacksonville Jaguars			Soldier Field	Fox	
14	December 13	12:00 p.m.	at Miami Dolphins			Hard Rock Stadium	CBS	
15	December 19	7:20 p.m.	at Buffalo Bills			Highmark Stadium	CBS	
16	December 25	12:00 p.m.	**Green Bay Packers**			Soldier Field	Netflix	
17	January 3	3:25 p.m.	**Detroit Lions**			Soldier Field	Fox	
18	January 9/10	TBD	at **Minnesota Vikings**			U.S. Bank Stadium	TBD	

Notes

- Intra-division opponents are in **bold** text.
- Networks, dates and times for games in Weeks 13, 14 and 17 are subject to change as a result of flexible scheduling; games in Week 15 and 16 are exempt.
- The date, time and network for Week 18 will be finalized at the end of Week 17.

=== Game summaries ===
==== Week 1: at Carolina Panthers ====
Week 1: Chicago Bears at Carolina Panthers – Game summary

Quarter	1	2	3	4	Total
**Bears**	14	17	14	14	**59**
Panthers	7	17	7	6	**37**

at Bank of America Stadium, Charlotte, North Carolina

- Date: September 13
- Game time: 1:00 p.m. EDT/12:00 p.m. CDT
- Game weather: Sunny, 89 °F (32 °C)
- Game attendance: 72,597
- Referee: Brad Allen
- TV announcers (Fox): Adam Amin, Drew Brees and Kristina Pink
- Recap, Game Book

Game information

**First quarter**

- CAR – Chuba Hubbard 4-yard pass from Bryce Young (Ryan Fitzgerald kick), 11:33. Panthers 7–0. **Drive: 6 plays, 42 yards, 2:23.**
- CHI – Caleb Williams 9-yard run (Cairo Santos kick), 5:52. Tied 7–7. **Drive: 9 plays, 73 yards, 5:41.**
- CHI – D'Andre Swift 1-yard run (Cairo Santos kick), 1:59. Bears 14–7. **Drive: 6 plays, 67 yards, 2:13.**

**Second quarter**

- CHI – Cole Kmet 22-yard pass from Caleb Williams (Cairo Santos kick), 13:57. Bears 21–7. **Drive: 2 plays, 41 yards, 0:51.**
- CAR – Jalen Coker 51-yard pass from Bryce Young (Ryan Fitzgerald kick), 12:40. Bears 21–14. **Drive: 3 plays, 73 yards, 1:17.**
- CAR – Bryce Young 7-yard run (Ryan Fitzgerald kick), 8:42. Tied 21–21. **Drive: 3 plays, 21 yards, 1:45.**
- CHI – Cairo Santos 40-yard field goal, 5:20. Bears 24–21. **Drive: 4 plays, 6 yards, 1:36.**
- CAR – Ryan Fitzgerald 44-yard field goal, 2:35. Tied 24–24. **Drive: 7 plays, 48 yards, 2:45.**
- CHI – Caleb Williams 29-yard run (Cairo Santos kick), 0:22. Bears 31–24. **Drive: 6 plays, 80 yards, 2:13.**

**Third quarter**

- CAR – Chuba Hubbard 2-yard run (Ryan Fitzgerald kick), 9:02. Tied 31–31. **Drive: 7 plays, 58 yards, 2:26.**
- CHI – D'Andre Swift 1-yard run (Cairo Santos kick), 3:05. Bears 38–31. **Drive: 13 plays, 65 yards, 5:57.**
- CHI – Kyle Monangai 61-yard run (Cairo Santos kick), 0:40. Bears 45–31. **Drive: 1 play, 61 yards, 0:10.**

**Fourth quarter**

- CHI – Jahdae Walker 1-yard pass from Caleb Williams (Cairo Santos kick), 6:27. Bears 52–31. **Drive: 12 plays, 61 yards, 8:23.**
- CAR – Jalen Coker 8-yard pass from Bryce Young (kick blocked), 4:00. Bears 52–37. **Drive: 10 plays, 76 yards, 2:27.**
- CHI – D'Andre Swift 28-yard run (Cairo Santos kick), 3:40. Bears 59–37. **Drive: 4 plays, 49 yards, 0:20.**

**Top passers**

- CHI – Caleb Williams – 21/29, 269 yards, 2 TD
- CAR – Bryce Young – 23/37, 361 yards, 3 TD, INT

**Top rushers**

- CHI – D'Andre Swift – 18 rushes, 124 yards, 3 TD
- CAR – Chuba Hubbard – 10 rushes, 49 yards, TD

**Top receivers**

- CHI – Kalif Raymond – 8 receptions, 84 yards
- CAR – Jalen Coker – 8 receptions, 138 yards, 2 TD

The Bears scored six rushing touchdowns, the most since 1941 when they shutout the Lions, 49–0. Their 59 points was also their highest scoring output since they beat the Packers 61–7 in 1980.

==== Week 2: vs. Minnesota Vikings ====
Week 2: Minnesota Vikings at Chicago Bears – Game summary

Quarter	1	2	3	4	Total
**Vikings**	3	3	0	3	**9**
Bears	3	0	0	0	**3**

at Soldier Field, Chicago, Illinois

- Date: September 20
- Game time: 12:00 p.m. CDT
- Game weather: Rain, 68 °F (20 °C)
- Game attendance: 58,914
- Referee: Land Clark
- TV announcers (Fox): Joe Davis, Greg Olsen and Pam Oliver
- Recap, Game Book

Game information

**First quarter**

- MIN – Will Reichard 35-yard field goal, 11:03. Vikings 3–0. **Drive: 9 plays, 55 yards, 3:57.**
- CHI – Cairo Santos 50-yard field goal, 5:03. Tied 3–3. **Drive: 9 plays, 37 yards, 6:00.**

**Second quarter**

- MIN – Will Reichard 49-yard field goal, 8:18. Vikings 6–3. **Drive: 11 plays, 33 yards, 5:45.**

**Third quarter**

- No scoring plays

**Fourth quarter**

- MIN – Will Reichard 39-yard field goal, 1:09. Vikings 9–3. **Drive: 11 plays, 67 yards, 5:12.**

**Top passers**

- MIN – Carson Wentz – 11/20, 143 yards
- CHI – Caleb Williams – 15/26, 138 yards, INT

**Top rushers**

- MIN – Aaron Jones – 23 rushes, 105 yards
- CHI – Kyle Monangai – 10 rushes, 47 yards

**Top receivers**

- MIN – Justin Jefferson – 3 receptions, 55 yards
- CHI – D'Andre Swift – 5 receptions, 54 yards

In a low-scoring game in rainy conditions, the Bears were held to zero touchdowns. Their only points came from a first quarter field goal, while the Vikings scored three. Early in the fourth quarter, quarterback Caleb Williams went down with a non-contact injury in the red zone and did not finish the game. The injury, later revealed to be a Grade 2 hamstring strain, would sideline him for three weeks. The Bears suffered their seventh consecutive home loss to the Vikings.

==== Week 3: vs. Philadelphia Eagles ====
Week 3: Philadelphia Eagles at Chicago Bears – Game summary

Quarter	1	2	3	4	Total
Eagles	0	7	0	0	**7**
**Bears**	7	3	10	7	**27**

at Soldier Field, Chicago, Illinois

- Date: September 28
- Game time: 7:15 p.m. CDT
- Game weather: Clear, 64 °F (18 °C)
- Game attendance: 59,588
- Referee: Shawn Hochuli
- TV announcers (ESPN/ABC): Joe Buck, Troy Aikman, Lisa Salters and Laura Rutledge
- Recap, Game Book

Game information

**First quarter**

- CHI – Luther Burden III 8-yard pass from Case Keenum (Cairo Santos kick), 8:47. Bears 7–0. **Drive: 11 plays, 66 yards, 6:13.**

**Second quarter**

- CHI – Cairo Santos 29-yard field goal, 1:52. Bears 10–0. **Drive: 11 plays, 69 yards, 4:22.**
- PHI – Jalen Hurts 1-yard run (Cairo Santos kick), 0:00. Bears 10–7. **Drive: 8 plays, 67 yards, 1:52.**

**Third quarter**

- CHI – Cairo Santos 48-yard field goal, 10:17. Bears 13–7. **Drive: 7 plays, 38 yards, 3:11.**
- CHI – Kalif Raymond 41-yard pass from Case Keenum (Cairo Santos kick), 5:47. Bears 20–7. **Drive: 5 plays, 71 yards, 2:49.**

**Fourth quarter**

- CHI – Case Keenum 1-yard run (Cairo Santos kick), 7:19. Bears 27–7. **Drive: 13 plays, 58 yards, 8:04.**

**Top passers**

- PHI – Jalen Hurts – 16/25, 153 yards, INT
- CHI – Case Keenum – 24/34, 247 yards, 2 TD

**Top rushers**

- PHI – Saquon Barkley – 15 rushes, 82 yards
- CHI – D'Andre Swift – 20 rushes, 84 yards

**Top receivers**

- PHI – Devonta Smith – 6 receptions, 65 yards
- CHI – Kalif Raymond – 6 receptions, 90 yards, TD

With starting quarterback Caleb Williams suffering from a hamstring injury and backup Tyson Bagent being in concussion protocol for most of the week, third-stringer Case Keenum was called to start for the Bears in Week 3. This was Keenum's first time starting since 2023, his last start occurring during his time with the Houston Texans. Keenum completed 24 of 34 passes for 247 yards and scored two touchdowns, as well as a 1-yard rushing touchdown.

This game marked the Bears' second straight win over the Eagles, following their 24–15 victory in 2025.

==== Week 4: vs. New York Jets ====
Week 4: New York Jets at Chicago Bears – Game summary

Quarter	1	2	3	4	Total
Jets	0	3	3	6	**12**
**Bears**	7	6	7	3	**23**

at Soldier Field, Chicago, Illinois

- Date: October 4
- Game time: 12:00 p.m. CDT
- Game weather: Sunny, 72 °F (22 °C)
- Game attendance: 59,702
- Referee: Carl Cheffers
- TV announcers (Fox): Tim Brando, Drew Brees and Kristina Pink
- Recap, Game Book

Game information

**First quarter**

- CHI – Kyle Monangai 1-yard run (Cairo Santos kick), 0:23. Bears 7–0. **Drive: 12 plays, 57 yards, 7:01.**

**Second quarter**

- NYJ – Jason Sanders 36-yard field goal, 8:15. Bears 7–3. **Drive: 6 plays, 16 yards, 3:27.**
- CHI – Cairo Santos 30-yard field goal, 2:29. Bears 10–3. **Drive: 11 plays, 59 yards, 5:46.**
- CHI – Cairo Santos 30-yard field goal, 0:00. Bears 13–3. **Drive: 11 plays, 69 yards, 1:44.**

**Third quarter**

- NYJ – Jason Sanders 30-yard field goal, 7:00. Bears 13–6. **Drive: 5 plays, 16 yards, 1:46.**
- CHI – Kyle Monangai 5-yard run (Cairo Santos kick), 2:26. Bears 20–6. **Drive: 9 plays, 72 yards, 4:34.**

**Fourth quarter**

- CHI – Cairo Santos 21-yard field goal, 10:01. Bears 23–6. **Drive: 11 plays, 77 yards, 5:56.**
- NYJ – Isaiah Williams 58-yard pass from Geno Smith (kick failed), 9:16. Bears 23–12. **Drive: 2 plays, 72 yards, 0:45.**

**Top passers**

- NYJ – Geno Smith – 8/15, 119 yards, TD
- CHI – Tyson Bagent – 25/34, 268 yards, INT

**Top rushers**

- NYJ – Braelon Allen – 14 rushes, 59 yards
- CHI – Kyle Monangai – 30 rushes, 146 yards, 2 TD

**Top receivers**

- NYJ – Isaiah Williams – 2 receptions, 73 yards, TD
- CHI – Rome Odunze – 6 receptions, 94 yards

Despite head coach Ben Johnson declining to publicly name a starter for Week 4, sources reported the Bears were planning to start backup quarterback Tyson Bagent against the Jets. Similarly to Case Keenum, Bagent's last starting game was in 2023, in which the Bears defeated the Carolina Panthers 16–13. Keenum and Bagent ultimately co-started, with the former pitching the ball to D'Andre Swift and the latter serving as a flanked-receiver; however, Bagent took over the game following the starting pitch.

Bagent completed 25 of 34 passes for 268 yards and an interception, with three other interceptions overturned by penalties. Running back Kyle Monangai rushed for 146 yards and two touchdowns on 30 carries, but also suffered an injury to both his thumb and his toe.

==== Week 5: at Green Bay Packers ====
Week 5: Chicago Bears at Green Bay Packers – Game summary

Quarter	1	2	3	4	Total
Bears	0	7	0	0	**7**
**Packers**	7	7	9	8	**31**

at Lambeau Field, Green Bay, Wisconsin

- Date: October 11
- Game time: 12:00 p.m. CDT
- Game weather: Sunny, 73 °F (23 °C)
- Game attendance: 77,755
- Referee: Clay Martin
- TV announcers (Fox): Kenny Albert, Greg Olsen, and Pam Oliver
- Recap, Game Book

Game information

**First quarter**

- GB – Christian Watson 42-yard pass from Jordan Love (Trey Smack kick), 5:51. Packers 7–0. **Drive: 10 plays, 91 yards, 6:13.**

**Second quarter**

- GB – MarShawn Lloyd 7-yard run (Trey Smack kick), 14:56. Packers 14–0. **Drive: 10 plays, 45 yards, 5:36.**
- CHI – D'Andre Swift 1-yard run (Cairo Santos kick), 1:51. Packers 14–7. **Drive: 16 plays, 78 yards, 9:10.**

**Third quarter**

- GB – Christian Watson 53-yard pass from Jordan Love (kick failed), 13:10. Packers 20–7. **Drive: 4 plays, 72 yards, 1:50.**
- GB – Trey Smack 35-yard field goal, 1:58. Packers 23–7. **Drive: 5 plays, 45 yards, 2:10.**

**Fourth quarter**

- GB – MarShawn Lloyd 4-yard run (Jordan Love–Matthew Golden pass), 14:55. Packers 31–7. **Drive: 3 plays, 55 yards, 0:39.**

**Top passers**

- CHI – Case Keenum – 11/19, 108 yards, INT
- GB – Jordan Love – 25/31, 367 yards, 2 TD

**Top rushers**

- CHI – D'Andre Swift – 9 rushes, 43 yards, TD
- GB – MarShawn Lloyd – 10 rushes, 31 yards, TD

**Top receivers**

- CHI – Luther Burden III – 4 receptions, 47 yards
- GB – Christian Watson – 6 receptions, 143 yards, 2 TD

This game marked the Bears' first loss to the Packers since Week 14 of 2025.

==== Week 6: at Atlanta Falcons ====
Week 6: Chicago Bears at Atlanta Falcons – Game summary

Quarter	1	2	3	4	Total
**Bears**	14	7	7	3	**31**
Falcons	0	7	0	16	**23**

at Mercedes-Benz Stadium, Atlanta, Georgia

- Date: October 18
- Game time: 1:00 p.m. EDT/12:00 p.m. CDT
- Game weather: None (retractable roof closed)
- Game attendance: 72,301
- Referee: Scott Novak
- TV announcers (Fox): Kevin Burkhardt, Tom Brady, Erin Andrews and Tom Rinaldi
- Recap, Game Book

Game information

**First quarter**

- CHI – Colston Loveland 14-yard pass from Caleb Williams (Cairo Santos kick), 8:15. Bears 7–0. **Drive: 10 plays, 67 yards, 6:45.**
- CHI – D'Andre Swift 4-yard run (Cairo Santos kick), 1:07. Bears 14–0. **Drive: 9 plays, 59 yards, 5:27.**

**Second quarter**

- ATL – Jahan Dotson 13-yard pass from Michael Penix Jr. (Nick Folk kick), 5:45. Bears 14–7. **Drive: 4 plays, 54 yards, 1:34.**
- CHI – D'Andre Swift 2-yard run (Cairo Santos kick), 1:26. Bears 21–7. **Drive: 3 plays, 10 yards, 0:17.**

**Third quarter**

- CHI – Roschon Johnson 4-yard run (Cairo Santos kick), 1:48. Bears 28–7. **Drive: 7 plays, 52 yards, 2:40.**

**Fourth quarter**

- CHI – Cairo Santos 50-yard field goal, 14:56. Bears 31–7. **Drive: 4 plays, -1 yard, 1:44.**
- ATL – Kyle Pitts 10-yard pass from Michael Penix Jr. (Michael Penix Jr.–Zachariah Branch pass), 9:34. Bears 31–15. **Drive: 8 plays, 91 yards, 2:38.**
- ATL – Kyle Pitts 5-yard pass from Michael Penix Jr. (Michael Penix Jr.–Drake London pass), 5:41. Bears 31–23. **Drive: 5 plays, 57 yards, 1:30.**

**Top passers**

- CHI – Caleb Williams – 30/36, 305 yards, TD
- ATL – Michael Penix Jr. – 19/33, 225 yards, 3 TD

**Top rushers**

- CHI – Roschon Johnson – 13 rushes, 51 yards, TD
- ATL – Bijan Robinson – 9 rushes, 61 yards

**Top receivers**

- CHI – Luther Burden III – 8 receptions, 95 yards
- ATL – Jahan Dotson – 3 receptions, 87 yards, TD

On October 17, sources reported that quarterback Caleb Williams would return for the Week 6 game against the Falcons. Williams had not started a game since his injury against the Vikings in Week 2, but had been a full participant in practice for the Week 6 game. He teased his return on TikTok, reposting a "hype edit" that addressed the criticism he received after his injury.

==== Week 7: vs. New England Patriots ====
Week 7: New England Patriots at Chicago Bears – Game summary

Quarter	1	2	3	4	Total
Patriots	0	14	7	3	**24**
**Bears**	10	10	7	3	**30**

at Soldier Field, Chicago, Illinois

- Date: October 22
- Game time: 7:15 p.m. CDT
- Game weather: Clear, 61 °F (16 °C)
- Game attendance: 60,520
- Referee: Alan Eck
- TV announcers (Prime Video): Al Michaels, Kirk Herbstreit and Kaylee Hartung
  Game simulcast on WCVB and WFLD
- Recap, Game Book

Game information

**First quarter**

- CHI – Cairo Santos 43-yard field goal, 9:53. Bears 3–0. **Drive: 5 plays, 29 yards, 1:37.**
- CHI – D'Andre Swift 4-yard run (Cairo Santos kick), 1:59. Bears 14–7. **Drive: 6 plays, 67 yards, 2:13.**

**Second quarter**

- NE – Drake Maye 7-yard rush (Andy Borregales kick), 11:33. Bears 10–7. **Drive: 9 plays, 74 yards, 5:05.**
- CHI – Cairo Santos 31-yard field goal, 7:04. Bears 13–7. **Drive: 9 plays, 30 yards, 4:29.**
- CHI – Luther Burden III 24-yard pass from Caleb Williams (Cairo Santos kick), 0:14. Bears 20–7. **Drive: 10 plays, 80 yards, 3:11.**
- NE – Rhamondre Stevenson 48-yard pass from Drake Maye (Andy Borregales kick), 0:00. Bears 20–14. **Drive: 2 plays, 66 yards, 0:14.**

**Third quarter**

- CHI – Colston Loveland 12-yard pass from Caleb Williams (Cairo Santos kick), 9:41. Bears 27–14. **Drive: 9 plays, 72 yards, 5:19.**
- NE – Eli Raridon 30-yard pass from Drake Maye (Andy Borregales kick), 3:46. Bears 27–21. **Drive: 9 plays, 80 yards, 5:55.**

**Fourth quarter**

- CHI – Cairo Santos 58-yard field goal, 1:34. Bears 30–21. **Drive: 12 plays, 51 yards, 4:48.**
- NE – Andy Borregales 47-yard field goal, 0:37. Bears 30–24. **Drive: 6 plays, 46 yards, 0:57.**

**Top passers**

- NE – Drake Maye – 24/31, 321 yards, 2 TD, INT
- CHI – Caleb Williams – 22/33, 308 yards, 2 TD

**Top rushers**

- NE – Drake Maye – 4 rushes, 26 yards, TD
- CHI – D'Andre Swift – 22 rushes, 78 yards, TD

**Top receivers**

- NE – Rhamondre Stevenson – 5 receptions, 93 yards, TD
- CHI – Luther Burden III – 4 receptions, 130 yards, TD

This game marked Chicago's first home game following the death of legendary head coach Mike Ditka. The Bears honored Ditka with stadium-wide tributes including commemorative No. 89 patches on player uniforms, pre-game 89:00 clock displays, knit headband giveaways for the first 10,000 fans, and fake mustaches for all fans in attendance.

This was the second most-watched Thursday Night Football game on Prime Video, with an average of 19.86 million viewers.

==== Week 8: at Seattle Seahawks ====
Week 8: Chicago Bears at Seattle Seahawks – Game summary

Quarter	1	2	3	4	Total
**Bears**	7	6	7	14	**34**
Seahawks	0	9	0	8	**17**

at Lumen Field, Seattle, Washington

- Date: November 2
- Game time: 7:15 p.m. CST/5:15 p.m. PST
- Game weather: Cloudy, 47 °F (8 °C)
- Game attendance: 68,739
- Referee: Shawn Smith
- TV announcers (WCIU/ESPN): Joe Buck, Troy Aikman and Lisa Salters
- Recap, Game Book

Game information

**First quarter**

- CHI – Luther Burden III 1-yard pass from Caleb Williams (Cairo Santos kick), 5:25. Bears 7–0. **Drive: 17 plays, 80 yards, 8:32.**

**Second quarter**

- SEA – Jason Myers 27-yard field goal, 12:50. Bears 7–3. **Drive: 7 plays, 45 yards, 3:51.**
- CHI – Cairo Santos 44-yard field goal, 6:07. Bears 10–3. **Drive: 7 plays, 47 yards, 3:27.**
- CHI – Cairo Santos 38-yard field goal, 1:08. Bears 13–3. **Drive: 8 plays, 55 yards, 3:40.**
- SEA – Jaxon Smith-Njigba 43-yard pass from Sam Darnold (kick failed), 0:30. Bears 13–9. **Drive: 5 plays, 71 yards, 0:38.**

**Third quarter**

- CHI – D'Andre Swift 1-yard run (Cairo Santos kick), 5:38. Bears 20–9. **Drive: 10 plays, 69 yards, 6:19.**

**Fourth quarter**

- SEA – Cooper Kupp 7-yard pass from Sam Darnold (Sam Darnold-Tory Horton pass), 11:46. Bears 20–17. **Drive: 3 plays, 25 yards, 1:20.**
- CHI – D'Andre Swift 5-yard run (Cairo Santos kick), 8:28. Bears 27–17. **Drive: 6 plays, 56 yards, 3:18.**
- CHI – D'Andre Swift 5-yard run (Cairo Santos kick), 4:41. Bears 34–17. **Drive: 4 plays, 6 yards, 1:11.**

**Top passers**

- CHI – Caleb Williams – 24/34, 247 yards, TD
- SEA – Sam Darnold – 17/34, 188 yards, 2 TD, INT

**Top rushers**

- CHI – D'Andre Swift – 27 rushes, 60 yards, 3 TD
- SEA – Jadarian Price – 10 rushes, 29 yards

**Top receivers**

- CHI – Rome Odunze – 4 receptions, 87 yards
- SEA – Jaxon Smith-Njigba – 6 receptions, 118 yards, TD

This marked the Bears' first start of 6–2 or better since 2012.

==== Week 9: vs. Tampa Bay Buccaneers ====
Week 9: Tampa Bay Buccaneers at Chicago Bears – Game summary

Quarter	1	2	3	4	Total
Buccaneers	0	6	7	11	**24**
**Bears**	14	3	7	3	**27**

at Soldier Field, Chicago, Illinois

- Date: November 8
- Game time: 7:20 p.m. CST
- Game weather: Clear, 53 °F (12 °C)
- Game attendance: 60,470
- Referee: Ronald Torbert
- TV announcers (NBC): Noah Eagle, Cris Collinsworth and Melissa Stark
- Recap, Game Book

Game information

**First quarter**

- CHI – Rome Odunze 9-yard pass from Caleb Williams (Cairo Santos kick), 9:38. Bears 7–0. **Drive: 10 plays, 53 yards, 5:22.**
- CHI – Luther Burden III 56-yard pass from Caleb Williams (Cairo Santos kick), 6:00. Bears 14–0. **Drive: 4 plays, 81 yards, 1:24.**

**Second quarter**

- TB – Chase McLaughlin 27-yard field goal, 13:48. Bears 14–3. **Drive: 13 plays, 67 yards, 7:12.**
- CHI – Cairo Santos 25-yard field goal, 3:02. Bears 17–3. **Drive: 6 plays, 45 yards, 2:16.**
- TB – Chase McLaughlin 21-yard field goal, 0:00. Bears 17–6. **Drive: 5 plays, 40 yards, 0:38.**

**Third quarter**

- TB – Bucky Irving 2-yard run (Chase McLaughlin kick), 11:37. Bears 17–13. **Drive: 6 plays, 74 yards, 3:23.**
- CHI – Jaylon Johnson 67-yard interception return (Cairo Santos kick), 3:39. Bears 24–13.

**Fourth quarter**

- TB – Chase McLaughlin 35-yard field goal, 11:24. Bears 24–16. **Drive: 8 plays, 48 yards, 4:00.**
- TB – Bucky Irving 6-yard run (Baker Mayfield run), 2:51. Tied 24–24. **Drive: 2 plays, 17 yards, 0:47.**
- CHI – Cairo Santos 38-yard field goal, 0:00. Bears 27–24. **Drive: 8 plays, 49 yards, 2:51.**

**Top passers**

- TB – Baker Mayfield – 18/32, 243 yards, 2 INT
- CHI – Caleb Williams – 22/37, 279 yards, 2 TD, 4 INT

**Top rushers**

- TB – Bucky Irving – 20 rushes, 97 yards, 2 TD
- CHI – D'Andre Swift – 12 rushes, 31 yards

**Top receivers**

- TB – Tez Johnson – 2 receptions, 76 yards
- CHI – Luther Burden III – 7 receptions, 97 yards, TD

Mike Tirico was originally supposed to call this game, but declined due to health reasons. Noah Eagle was selected to substitute for him.

The Bears dominated the Buccaneers in the first half. Tampa Bay attempted a comeback in the second half and tied the game late in the fourth quarter, but the Bears scored a game-winning field goal as time expired. With the win, the Bears improved to 7–2.

==== Week 11: vs. New Orleans Saints ====
Week 11: New Orleans Saints at Chicago Bears – Game summary

Quarter	1	2	3	4	Total
Saints	0	10	0	3	**13**
**Bears**	3	13	3	2	**21**

at Soldier Field, Chicago, Illinois

- Date: November 22
- Game time: 12:00 p.m. CST
- Game weather: Cloudy, 56 °F (13 °C)
- Game attendance: 59,911
- Referee: Brad Rogers
- TV announcers (Fox): Kevin Burkhardt, Tom Brady, Erin Andrews and Tom Rinaldi
- Recap, Game Book

Game information

**First quarter**

- CHI – Cairo Santos 41-yard field goal, 10:43. Bears 3–0. **Drive: 10 plays, 46 yards, 4:17.**

**Second quarter**

- CHI – D'Andre Swift 3-yard pass from Caleb Williams (Cairo Santos kick), 11:34. Bears 10–0. **Drive: 6 plays, 41 yards, 2:47.**
- CHI – Coleston Loveland 15-yard pass from Caleb Williams (kick failed), 7:21. Bears 16–0. **Drive: 3 plays, 46 yards, 1:33.**
- NO – Alvin Kamara 1-yard pass from Tyler Shough (Charlie Smyth kick), 3:34. Bears 16–7. **Drive: 7 plays, 80 yards, 3:47.**
- NO – Charlie Smyth 56-yard field goal, 0:00. Bears 16–10. **Drive: 9 plays, 46 yards, 0:54.**

**Third quarter**

- CHI – Cairo Santos 35-yard field goal, 7:16. Bears 19–10. **Drive: 11 plays, 63 yards, 5:32.**

**Fourth quarter**

- CHI – Tyler Shough sacked by Montez Sweat for 7-yard loss for safety, 12:55. Bears 21–10. **Drive: 2 plays, -7 yards, 0:46.**
- NO – Charlie Smyth 51-yard field goal, 1:10. Bears 21–13. **Drive: 14 plays, 47 yards, 3:48.**

**Top passers**

- NO – Tyler Shough – 25/42, 222 yards, TD, INT
- CHI – Caleb Williams – 15/23, 181 yards, 2 TD, INT

**Top rushers**

- NO – Travis Etienne – 14 rushes, 76 yards
- CHI – D'Andre Swift – 13 rushes, 51 yards

**Top receivers**

- NO – Chris Olave – 9 receptions, 102 yards
- CHI – Zavion Thomas – 2 receptions, 56 yards

==== Week 12: at Detroit Lions ====
Thanksgiving Day Games

Week 12: Chicago Bears at Detroit Lions – Game summary

Quarter	1	2	3	4	Total
Bears	0	0	0	0	**0**
Lions	0	0	0	0	**0**

at Ford Field, Detroit, Michigan

- Date: November 26
- Game time: 1:00 p.m. EST/12:00 p.m. CST
- Game weather: None (indoor stadium)
- TV announcers (CBS): Jim Nantz, J. J. Watt and Tracy Wolfson
- Preview

=== Standings ===
==== Division ====
NFC North
	W	L	T	PCT	DIV	CONF	PF	PA	STK
Detroit Lions	8	2	0	.800	2–0	5–1	288	220	W6
Chicago Bears	8	2	0	.800	0–2	6–2	262	197	W5
Minnesota Vikings	7	2	0	.778	3–1	5–1	176	126	W1
Green Bay Packers	6	4	0	.600	1–3	4–4	226	221	L1

==== Conference ====
NFC
Seed	Team	Division	W	L	T	PCT	DIV	CONF	SOS	SOV	STK
**Division leaders**
1	San Francisco 49ers	West	8	1	0	.889	3–0	5–1	.428	.444	W2
2 (Note: Detroit wins tie break over Chicago based on division record.)	Detroit Lions	North	8	2	0	.800	2–0	5–1	.440	.375	W6
3	New York Giants	East	5	3	1	.611	2–1–1	3–3–1	.356	.308	L1
4	Carolina Panthers	South	5	5	0	.500	2–1	4–3	.510	.412	W2
**Wild cards**
5	Chicago Bears	North	8	2	0	.800	0–2	6–2	.434	.375	W5
6	Minnesota Vikings	North	7	2	0	.778	3–1	5–1	.516	.423	W1
7 (Note: Green Bay wins tie break over Seattle based on conference record. Division tie break was initially used to eliminate LA Rams (see below).)	Green Bay Packers	North	6	4	0	.600	1–3	4–4	.535	.459	L1
**In the hunt**
8 (Note: Seattle wins tie break over LA Rams based on division record.)	Seattle Seahawks	West	6	4	0	.600	2–1	2–3	.515	.393	W2
9	Los Angeles Rams	West	6	4	0	.600	1–2	4–2	.485	.345	W4
10	Dallas Cowboys	East	5	6	0	.455	2–1	2–5	.400	.290	W1
11	Washington Commanders	East	3	5	1	.389	2–2–1	3–4–1	.506	.500	W1
12 (Note: Tampa Bay wins tie break over Philadelphia based on conference record. Division tie break was initially used to eliminate Atlanta and New Orleans (see below).) (Note: Tampa Bay wins tie break over Atlanta and New Orleans based on head-to-head record.)	Tampa Bay Buccaneers	South	3	7	0	.300	2–0	3–4	.616	.419	L2
13 (Note: Atlanta wins tie break over Philadephia based on conference record. Division tie break was initially used to eliminate New Orleans (see below).) (Note: Atlanta wins tie break over New Orleans based on head-to-head victory.)	Atlanta Falcons	South	3	7	0	.300	1–2	3–3	.586	.586	L3
14 (Note: New Orleans wins tie break over Philadelphia based on conference record.)	New Orleans Saints	South	3	7	0	.300	0–2	1–5	.571	.517	L2
15	Philadelphia Eagles	East	3	7	0	.300	1–3	1–6	.521	.362	W1
16	Arizona Cardinals	West	3	8	0	.273	1–4	2–6	.621	.400	L3
