= Ryan Poles =

American football player and executive (born 1985)

Chicago Bears
- Title: General manager

Personal information
- Born: September 20, 1985 (age 41); Canandaigua, New York, U.S.

Career information
- Position: Guard
- High school: Canandaigua (NY)
- College: Boston College (2003–2007)
- NFL draft: 2008: undrafted

Career history

Playing
- Chicago Bears (2008)*
- * Offseason or practice squad member only

Coaching
- Boston College (2008) Graduate assistant

Operations
- Kansas City Chiefs (2009–2021); Scouting assistant (2009); College scouting coordinator (2010–2015); Director of college scouting (2016–2018); Assistant director of player personnel (2019–2020); Executive director of player personnel (2021); Chicago Bears (2022–present) General manager

Awards and highlights
- Super Bowl champion (LIV)
- Executive profile at Pro Football Reference

Ryan Poles (born September 20, 1985) is an American professional football executive and former guard who is the general manager of the Chicago Bears of the National Football League (NFL). Poles previously served as the executive director of player personnel for the Kansas City Chiefs and had served in various executive roles with the Chiefs for 13 seasons.

== Early life ==
A native of Canandaigua, New York, Poles attended Canandaigua Academy before playing college football at Boston College at guard from 2003 to 2007. Poles signed as an undrafted free agent with the Chicago Bears in 2008, but he did not make it on the 53-man roster and was cut.

== Executive career ==
=== Boston College ===
In 2008, following the end of his playing career, Poles returned to his alma mater Boston College as a graduate assistant and was involved in recruiting.

=== Kansas City Chiefs ===
In 2009, Poles was hired by the Kansas City Chiefs as a scouting assistant under general manager Scott Pioli. In 2010, he was promoted to college scouting coordinator. In 2013, Poles was retained under new general manager John Dorsey.

In 2016, Poles was promoted to director of college scouting. Poles was retained and promoted to assistant director of player personnel in 2018 under new general manager Brett Veach.

On June 9, 2021, Poles was promoted to executive director of player personnel.

=== Chicago Bears ===
On January 25, 2022, Poles was named the general manager of the Chicago Bears, replacing Ryan Pace. He hired Matt Eberflus as the team's head coach on January 27, while also hiring Luke Getsy as the team's offensive coordinator shortly after. Poles' first significant move with the Bears was trading Pro Bowl linebacker Khalil Mack and his salary cap hit to the Los Angeles Chargers for a second-round pick in the 2022 NFL draft and a sixth-round pick in 2023.

At the 2022 trade deadline, Poles traded linebacker Roquan Smith to the Baltimore Ravens for A. J. Klein, along with second and fifth-round picks in the 2023 NFL draft. Smith and the Bears were unable to negotiate a long-term contract extension prior to the trade. Poles also traded the Bears' own 2023 second round pick (ultimately pick 32) to the Pittsburgh Steelers for wide receiver Chase Claypool. The Bears traded Claypool and a seventh-round pick to Miami for a 2025 sixth-round pick less than a year later. The Bears finished the 2022 season with a league-worst (3–14) record and secured the first overall pick in 2023 NFL draft.

On March 10, 2023, Poles traded the first overall pick to the Carolina Panthers in exchange for their 9th and 61st overall picks in the 2023 NFL draft, a 1st-round pick in 2024, a 2nd-round pick in 2025, and wide receiver D. J. Moore. The Bears would then trade down one slot, and eventually select tackle Darnell Wright with the 10th overall pick in 2023. Wright would eventually be named to the PFWA All-Rookie team. The Panthers finished the following 2023 NFL season with the worst NFL record, giving the Bears the first overall pick again (via Carolina) in the 2024 NFL Draft, to go along with their own 9th overall pick. Poles used the draft capital to refresh the team's roster, drafting Heisman Trophy-winning quarterback Caleb Williams with the first overall pick in 2024, standout wide receiver Rome Odunze with the 9th overall pick, while also trading for Pro-Bowl wide receiver Keenan Allen, and signing running back D'Andre Swift. This was augmented by signing former Seattle Seahawks offensive coordinator Shane Waldron to become the team's next offensive coordinator, after firing Getsy prior.

Despite the influx of talent added to the roster, the Bears finished the 2024 season with a 5-12 record, a massive disappointment according to many sources. The season was underscored by the firing of offensive coordinator Shane Waldron just nine games into his tenure. Two weeks later, Matt Eberflus was fired after the 2024 Thanksgiving Day game at the Detroit Lions, where Eberflus was widely criticized for not calling a timeout in the dying moments of the team's 23-20 loss. Thomas Brown served as interim head coach for the final five games, finishing 1-4, with a win over the Green Bay Packers in the final game of the season snapping the Bears' 10-game losing streak. Poles and the Bears' brass eventually hired Lions offensive coordinator Ben Johnson to serve as Eberflus' successor, and shortly followed up by signing former New Orleans Saints head coach Dennis Allen as the team's defensive coordinator.

During the 2025 NFL draft, Poles and his staff added some talent to the offense, drafting standout tight end Colston Loveland from Michigan, wide receiver Luther Burden III, offensive tackle Ozzy Trapilo, and running back Kyle Monangai. This came on top of significant additions that improved the offensive line, such as All-Pro left guard Joe Thuney, center Drew Dalman, and guard Jonah Jackson.

On July 11, 2025, Poles and the Bears agreed to a three-year contract extension that runs through the 2029 season.

In September 2025, Poles’ leadership and management style became the subject of a three-part investigative report by journalist Tyler Dunne, published in Go Long, which cited interviews with 32 current and former Chicago Bears players, coaches, scouts, and staff members and heavily criticized his leadership and internal communication. The report described concerns from scouts regarding the quarterback evaluation process leading up to the 2024 NFL Draft, with some alleging that dissenting opinions were discouraged and that alternative prospects were portrayed negatively during internal draft meetings. It further reported that Poles was dismissive of quarterback Drake Maye’s college film during evaluations, including accounts from sources who said he laughed and cut off film review sessions prematurely. The report included claims that critical background information from Caleb Williams’ medical report was not shared with offensive coaches, impacting their ability to coach him effectively. Interim head coach Thomas Brown confronted Poles about this late in the season, noting that the information would have been helpful months earlier.

Sources described Poles’ day-to-day presence within the organization as distant and transactional, with employees across multiple departments portraying him as disengaged from staff. The report alleged that Poles was heavily focused on public perception and media narratives, frequently monitoring social media activity and involving himself in the team’s digital and communications output, with some sources suggesting that optics were a significant priority. Sources criticized how personnel decisions and staff dismissals were handled, with several alleging that fired staffers were treated “like criminals,” and that Poles portrayed them negatively following their departures. The report cited concerns about Poles’ communication and interpersonal approach, with sources suggesting that communication issues persisted within the organization and that staff were at times placed in difficult or uncomfortable positions as a result of internal directives. Multiple NFL general managers criticized Poles in the report, particularly his perceived arrogance and entitlement, with one describing him as an “arrogant asshole”—a level of criticism considered rare among league peers. Others echoed similar sentiments, with one saying he “acts like he has it all figured out and has all the answers.”

In the 2026 NFL Draft, Ryan Poles and his staff selected Oregon safety Dillon Thieneman in the first round, followed by center Logan Jones, tight end Sam Roush, and wide receiver Zavion Thomas over the next three rounds, emphasizing offensive depth while adding a key defensive piece early.

== Personal life ==
Poles is married to his wife, Katie, and they have two children together. Poles graduated from Boston College with a degree in communications in 2007.
