= Harrison Freid =

American football executive and former lacrosse player

Chicago Bears
- Title: Director of Research and Analysis

Personal information
- Born: 1989 (age 36–37); Needham, Massachusetts, U.S.

Career information
- High school: Needham (Needham, Massachusetts)
- College: University of Michigan (BA); St. John's University (MBA)

Career history
- National Football League; Football Operations Analyst / Talent Acquisition Analyst (2015–2016); Miami Dolphins; Football Administration Staff Assistant (2016); Personnel Assistant (2017); Head Coach Assistant – Research & Analysis (2018–2021); Chicago Bears; Director of Research and Analysis (2022–present)

Harrison Freid is an American football executive who serves as the Director of Research and Analysis for the Chicago Bears of the National Football League (NFL). He previously worked in football operations for the NFL League Office and the Miami Dolphins before joining the Bears in 2022.

Before beginning his career in professional football, Freid was an accomplished lacrosse player. He played collegiate lacrosse at the University of Michigan and St. John's University, earning multiple All-American honors and selection to the United States Intercollegiate Lacrosse Association North–South Senior All-Star Game. Internationally, he represented the Israel men's national lacrosse team in field and box lacrosse, competing in the 2014 World Lacrosse Championship and the 2015 World Indoor Lacrosse Championship, and won a gold medal at the 2017 European Box Lacrosse Championships.

== Early life and education ==
Freid grew up in Needham, Massachusetts, where he attended Needham High School. A multi-sport athlete, he played both football and lacrosse, earning All-American honors in lacrosse during his senior year.

Freid attended the University of Michigan, graduating in 2011 with a Bachelor of Arts degree in communications. While at Michigan, he played four seasons for the university's men's club lacrosse team in the Men's Collegiate Lacrosse Association (MCLA), serving as team captain during his senior season. During his career, Michigan won three MCLA national championships, and Freid earned First-Team All-American honors three times and was named the Central Collegiate Lacrosse Association Defensive Player of the Year in 2011.

Following his graduation from Michigan, Freid enrolled at St. John's University, where he pursued a Master of Business Administration in executive management. With one season of NCAA eligibility remaining, he joined the St. John's Red Storm men's lacrosse team for the 2012 season. Following the season, he was selected to participate in the United States Intercollegiate Lacrosse Association Division I/II North–South Senior All-Star Game.

== International Lacrosse career ==
Internationally, Freid represented the Israel men's national lacrosse team. He competed for Israel in the 2014 World Lacrosse Championship, helping the team achieve its best-ever finish at the time. Freid qualified to represent Israel through his Jewish heritage.

Freid later represented Israel at the 2015 World Indoor (Box) Lacrosse Championship, where the national team finished fourth, its best-ever result in international box lacrosse competition.

In 2017, Freid was a member of the Israel team that won the inaugural European Box Lacrosse Championships, defeating the Czech Republic men's national lacrosse team in the championship game to capture the gold medal—the first European box lacrosse title in Israeli history.

== Football administration career ==
Following graduate school, Freid transitioned into football administration. He joined the football staff at the University of Michigan, where he worked in player personnel and football operations while completing his graduate studies. Freid began his professional football career at the NFL League Office, where he served as a Football Operations Analyst and Talent Acquisition Analyst. In those roles, he supported league football operations and personnel initiatives.

In 2016, Freid joined the Miami Dolphins as a Football Administration Staff Assistant. He was promoted to Personnel Assistant in 2017 before serving as Head Coach Assistant – Research & Analysis. During his six seasons with the Dolphins, he supported the coaching staff, football administration, and personnel departments through research and analytics, and was a member of the organization during its back-to-back winning seasons in 2020 and 2021, the franchise's first consecutive winning seasons in two decades.

In 2022, Freid joined the Chicago Bears as Manager of Football Administration under General Manager Ryan Poles, overseeing salary cap administration, player contracts, and football operations within the organization. Following the hiring of head coach Ben Johnson in 2025, Freid was retained as Director of Research and Analysis as part of Johnson's inaugural coaching staff. Johnson continued utilizing Freid's expertise in game management and situational football, with Freid serving as a key advisor on in-game strategy and decision-making. He remained one of the few football operations staff members retained through the coaching transition.

== Personal life ==
Freid is the younger brother of comedian and podcast host Jared Freid. He is married to sports broadcaster Ruthie Polinsky, a television reporter who works at Chicago Sports Network and has covered the Chicago sports market.
