= Cam Lewis =

American football player (born 1997)

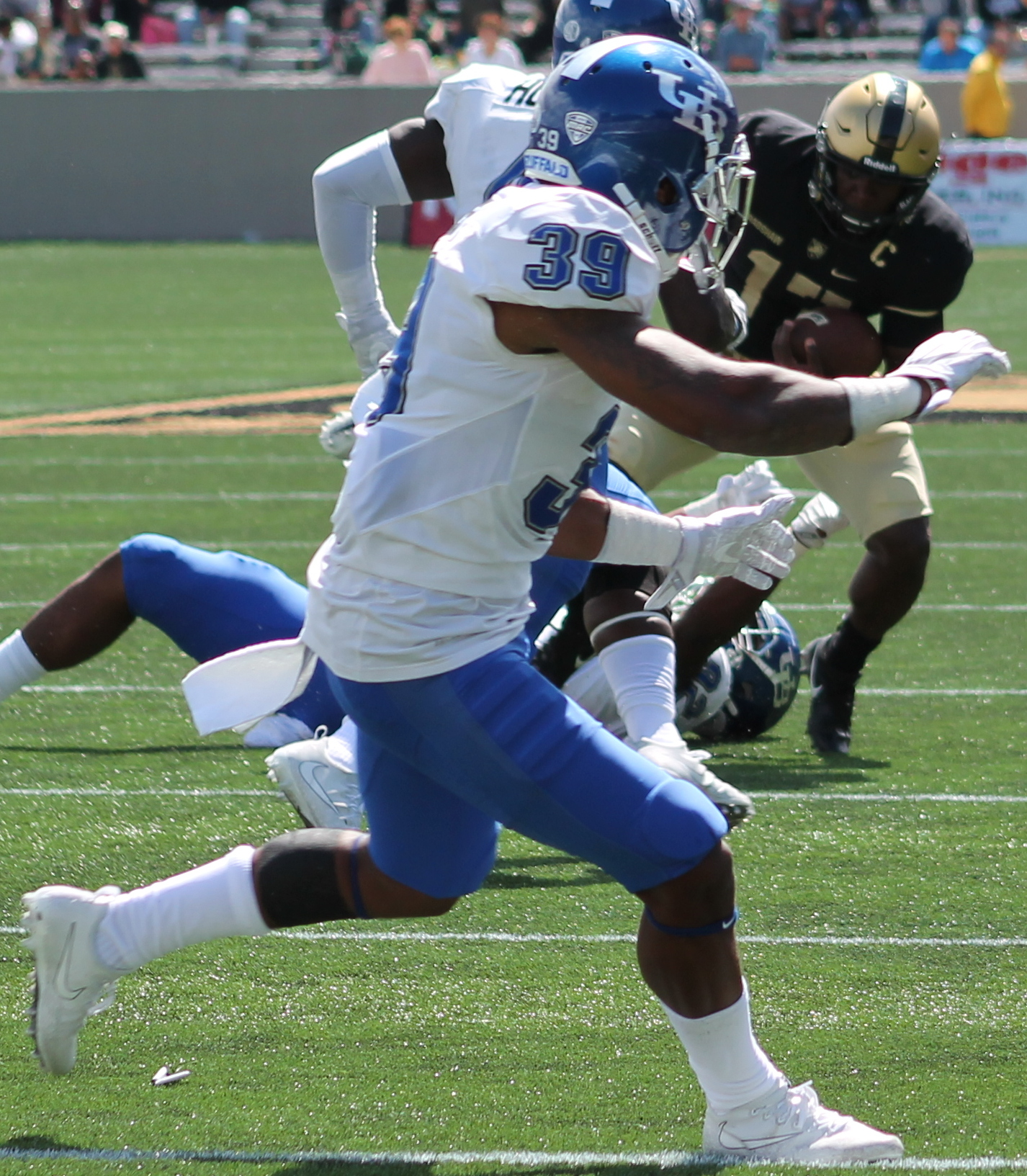
- Lewis with the Buffalo Bulls in 2017

No. 21 – Chicago Bears
- Position: Cornerback
- Roster status: Active

Personal information
- Born: April 13, 1997 (age 29); Detroit, Michigan, U.S.
- Listed height: 5 ft 9 in (1.75 m)
- Listed weight: 183 lb (83 kg)

Career information
- High school: Consortium College Prep (Detroit)
- College: Buffalo (2015–2018)
- NFL draft: 2019: undrafted

Career history
- Buffalo Bills (2019–2025); Chicago Bears (2026–present)

Awards and highlights
- Second-team All-MAC (2018)

Career NFL statistics as of Week 5, 2026
- Total tackles: 185
- Forced fumbles: 3
- Pass deflections: 11
- Interceptions: 1
- Stats at Pro Football Reference

Cameron Lewis (born April 13, 1997) is an American professional football cornerback for the Chicago Bears of the National Football League (NFL). He has previously played in the NFL for the Buffalo Bills. He was signed by the Bills as an undrafted free agent in 2019. He played college football for the Buffalo Bulls.

== College career ==
Lewis received scholarship offers to play college football at Toledo and Western Michigan but ultimately attended the University at Buffalo, where he played on the Buffalo Bulls football team from 2015 to 2018.

As a freshman on November 11, 2015, Lewis returned an interception 68 yards for a touchdown during a game against Northern Illinois. As a junior in 2017, injuries limited him to only seven games. On September 11, 2018, he was named the Mid-American Conference (MAC) East Defensive Player of the Week after recording two interceptions in a game against Temple. As a senior in 2018, despite missing time with a high-ankle sprain, Lewis led the team in interceptions and passes defended and was named to the All-MAC Second-team Defense.

== Professional career ==
Pre-draft measurables
Height	Weight	Arm length	Hand span	Wingspan	40-yard dash	10-yard split	20-yard split	20-yard shuttle	Three-cone drill	Vertical jump	Broad jump	Bench press
5 ft 9 3/8 in (1.76 m)	183 lb (83 kg)	30 1/2 in (0.77 m)	8 7/8 in (0.23 m)	6 ft 0 7/8 in (1.85 m)	4.51 s	1.59 s	2.62 s	4.20 s	6.71 s	32.0 in (0.81 m)	10 ft 4 in (3.15 m)	9 reps
All values from Pro Day

=== Buffalo Bills ===
Lewis was signed by the Buffalo Bills as an undrafted free agent following the conclusion of the 2019 NFL draft. He was waived on August 31, 2019, and was signed to the practice squad the next day. He signed a reserve/future contract with the Bills on January 6, 2020.

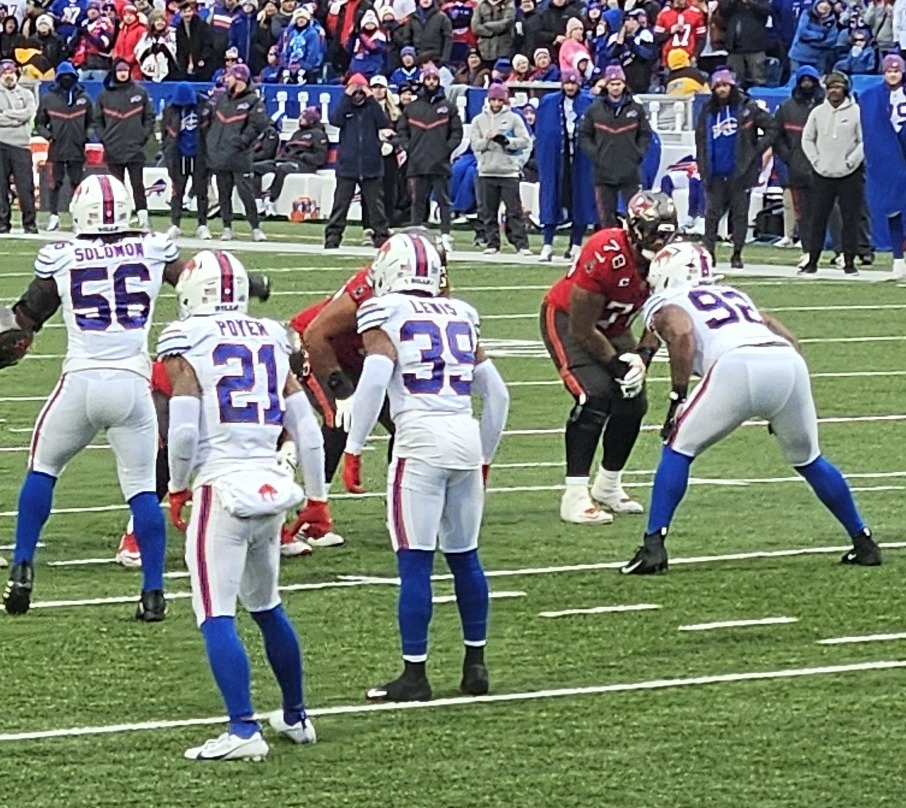
Lewis (#39) in action against the Tampa Bay Buccaneers in 2025

On September 5, 2020, Lewis was waived by the Bills and signed to the practice squad the next day. He was elevated to the active roster on September 12 for the week 1 game against the New York Jets and made his NFL debut in that game, appearing on six special teams plays. He was reverted to the practice squad the day after the game. He was promoted to the active roster on September 17. He was waived on October 1 and re-signed to the practice squad the next day. He was promoted back to the active roster on October 7. Lewis made his first career NFL start on October 13 against the Tennessee Titans. On Tennessee's first play from scrimmage, Lewis stopped Derrick Henry, the previous season's leading rusher, at the line of scrimmage for the first tackle of his career. He tallied seven total tackles on the day. He was placed on injured reserve on October 31.

On August 31, 2021, Lewis was waived by the Bills and re-signed to the practice squad the next day. On October 3, 2021, Lewis forced his first career fumble in a game against the Houston Texans. He was signed to the active roster on November 11, 2021.

On March 13, 2023, Lewis signed a one-year contract extension. He played in all 17 games as the backup nickelback.

On March 11, 2024, Lewis signed a two-year contract extension with the Bills.

=== Chicago Bears ===
On March 13, 2026, Lewis signed a two-year, $6 million contract with the Chicago Bears.

Although initially expected to compete at nickelback, injuries to Coby Bryant and Elijah Hicks led to Lewis being slotted at safety for the 2026 season. Bears assistant defensive backs coach Matt Giordano described Lewis as the unit's Swiss Army knife since he could also rotate in at nickel and dimeback. He began the regular season as one of the Bears' primary safeties and a mentor to first-round draft pick Dillon Thieneman. In Week 9, he intercepted Tampa Bay Buccaneers quarterback Baker Mayfield.

== NFL career statistics ==
Legend
**Bold**	Career high

=== Regular season ===
Year	Team	Games		Tackles					Interceptions						Fumbles				
Year	Team	GP	GS	Cmb	Solo	Ast	Sck	TFL	Int	Yds	Avg	Lng	TD	PD	FF	Fum	FR	Yds	TD
2020	BUF	5	2	7	5	2	0.0	0	0	0	0.0	0	0	0	0	0	0	0	0
2021	BUF	7	1	6	3	3	0.0	1	0	0	0.0	0	0	1	1	0	0	0	0
2022	BUF	13	1	21	15	6	0.0	0	0	0	0.0	0	0	0	0	0	0	0	0
2023	BUF	17	0	21	17	4	0.0	1	0	0	0.0	0	0	2	0	0	0	0	0
2024	BUF	17	6	**68**	**47**	**21**	0.0	**2**	**1**	0	0.0	0	0	**4**	0	0	0	0	0
2025	BUF	17	4	43	33	10	0.0	1	0	0	0.0	0	0	**4**	**2**	0	0	0	0
2026	CHI	4	3	19	14	5	0.0	0	0	0	0.0	0	0	0	0	0	0	0	0
Career		80	17	185	134	51	0.0	5	1	0	0.0	0	0	11	3	0	0	0	0

=== Postseason ===
Year	Team	Games		Tackles					Interceptions						Fumbles				
Year	Team	GP	GS	Cmb	Solo	Ast	Sck	TFL	Int	Yds	Avg	Lng	TD	PD	FF	Fum	FR	Yds	TD
2021	BUF	2	0	3	0	3	0.0	0	0	0	0.0	0	0	0	0	0	0	0	0
2022	BUF	2	0	3	1	2	0.0	0	0	0	0.0	0	0	0	0	0	0	0	0
2023	BUF	2	0	4	2	2	0.0	0	0	0	0.0	0	0	0	0	0	0	0	0
2024	BUF	3	0	5	4	1	0.0	0	0	0	0.0	0	0	0	**1**	0	0	0	0
2025	BUF	2	1	**10**	**6**	**4**	0.0	0	0	0	0.0	0	0	**2**	0	0	0	0	0
Career		11	1	25	13	12	0.0	0	0	0	0.0	0	0	2	1	0	0	0	0
