= D. J. Moore =

American football player (born 1997)

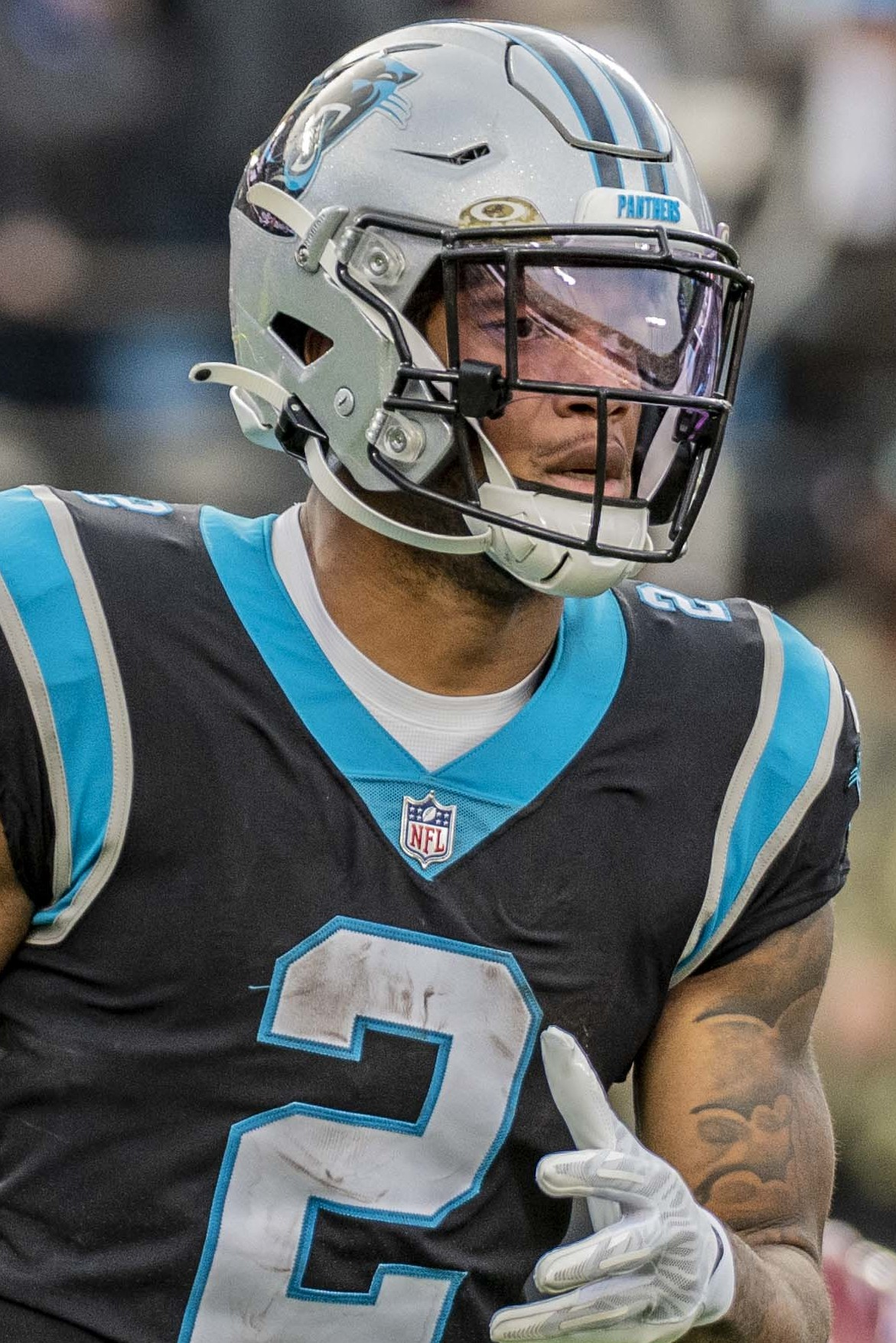
- Moore with the Carolina Panthers in 2021

No. 2 – Buffalo Bills
- Position: Wide receiver
- Roster status: Active

Personal information
- Born: April 14, 1997 (age 29); Philadelphia, Pennsylvania, U.S.
- Listed height: 6 ft 0 in (1.83 m)
- Listed weight: 213 lb (97 kg)

Career information
- High school: Imhotep Institute Charter (Philadelphia)
- College: Maryland (2015–2017)
- NFL draft: 2018: 1st round, 24th overall pick

Career history
- Carolina Panthers (2018–2022); Chicago Bears (2023–2025); Buffalo Bills (2026–present)

Awards and highlights
- PFWA All-Rookie Team (2018); Second-team All-American (2017); Big Ten Receiver of the Year (2017); First-team All-Big Ten (2017)

Career NFL statistics as of Week 11, 2026
- Receptions: 639
- Receiving yards: 8,679
- Receiving touchdowns: 45
- Rushing yards: 534
- Rushing touchdowns: 2
- Stats at Pro Football Reference

Denniston Oliver "D. J." Moore Jr. (born April 14, 1997) is an American professional football wide receiver for the Buffalo Bills of the National Football League (NFL). He played college football for the Maryland Terrapins and was selected by the Carolina Panthers in the first round of the 2018 NFL draft.

== Early life ==
Moore attended Imhotep Institute Charter High School in Philadelphia, Pennsylvania, where he played high school football. Moore is of Jamaican descent through his father. He committed to the University of Maryland, College Park, to play college football.

== College career ==
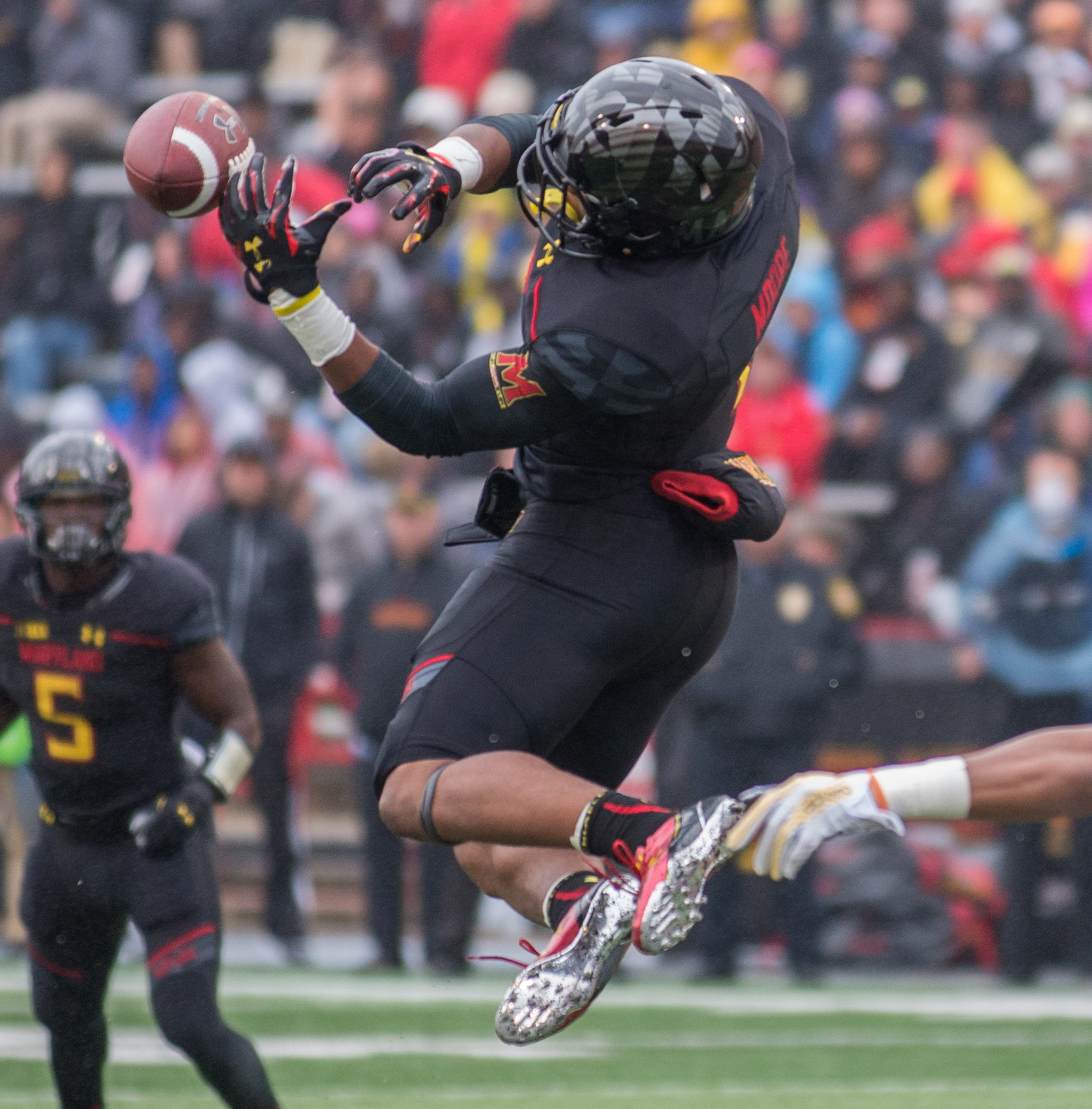
Moore during his time at Maryland, 2015

Moore played for the Maryland Terrapins from 2015 to 2017 under head coaches Randy Edsall, Mike Locksley, and D. J. Durkin.

As a freshman, Moore started 10 of Maryland's 12 games, recording 25 receptions for 357 yards and three touchdowns. As a sophomore, he started all 13 games and had 41 receptions for 637 yards and six touchdowns. As a junior, he started all 12 games and set a school record with 80 receptions for 1,033 yards and eight touchdowns. After his junior season, Moore was named to the first-team All-Big Ten Conference, and was the Big Ten Receiver of the Year.

Following his junior season, Moore made the decision to enter the 2018 NFL draft.

== Professional career ==
=== Pre-draft ===
Moore was invited to the 2018 NFL Combine, where he led receivers in the broad jump, and recorded the second best vertical jump. He also ran a 4.42 second 40-yard dash.

Pre-draft measurables
| Height | Weight | Arm length | Hand span | Wingspan | 40-yard dash | 10-yard split | 20-yard split | 20-yard shuttle | Three-cone drill | Vertical jump | Broad jump | Bench press |
|---|---|---|---|---|---|---|---|---|---|---|---|---|
| 6 ft 0 in (1.83 m) | 210 lb (95 kg) | 31 5/8 in (0.80 m) | 9 5/8 in (0.24 m) | 6 ft 4 1/4 in (1.94 m) | 4.42 s | 1.53 s | 2.59 s | 4.07 s | 6.95 s | 39.5 in (1.00 m) | 11 ft 0 in (3.35 m) | 15 reps |
All values from NFL Combine

=== Carolina Panthers ===
==== 2018 ====
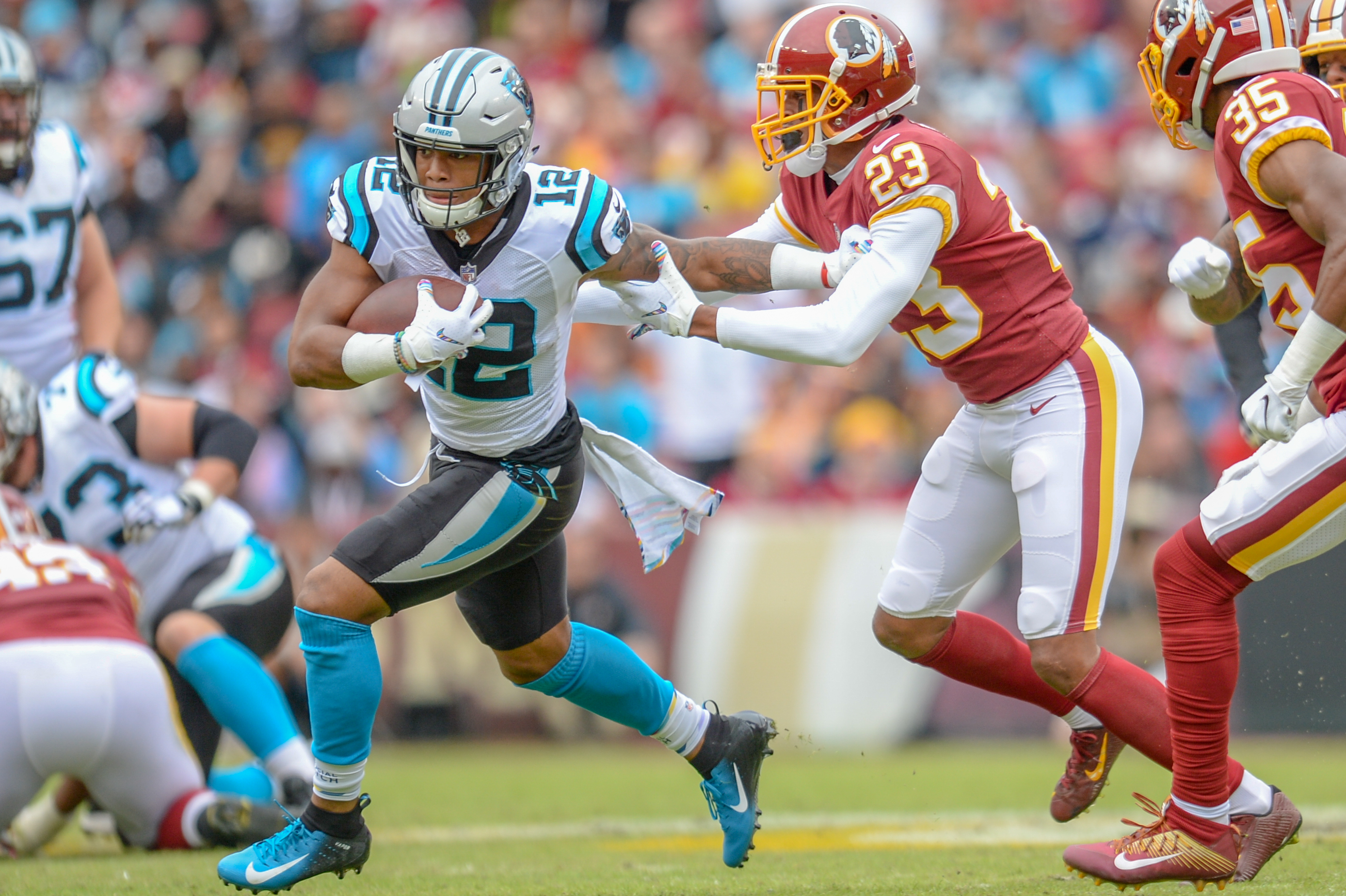
Moore playing against the Washington Redskins in 2018

Moore was selected by the Carolina Panthers in the first round with the 24th overall pick in the 2018 NFL Draft. Moore was the first wide receiver drafted. On June 18, 2018, he signed a four-year deal worth $11.2 million featuring a $6.2 million signing bonus.

Moore made his NFL debut in the Panthers' season opener against the Dallas Cowboys. In the 16–8 victory, he had no targets but did have a three-yard rush to go along with a 15-yard punt return. In the following game, a 31–24 loss to the Atlanta Falcons, he recorded a 51-yard touchdown reception for his first professional catch. In a Week 11 loss to the Detroit Lions, Moore had a breakout game with seven receptions for 157 yards and a touchdown. Overall, he finished his rookie season with 55 receptions for 788 yards and two touchdowns. He was named to the PFWA All-Rookie Team, becoming the second Panthers receiver to claim this award, joining Rae Carruth in 1997.

==== 2019 ====
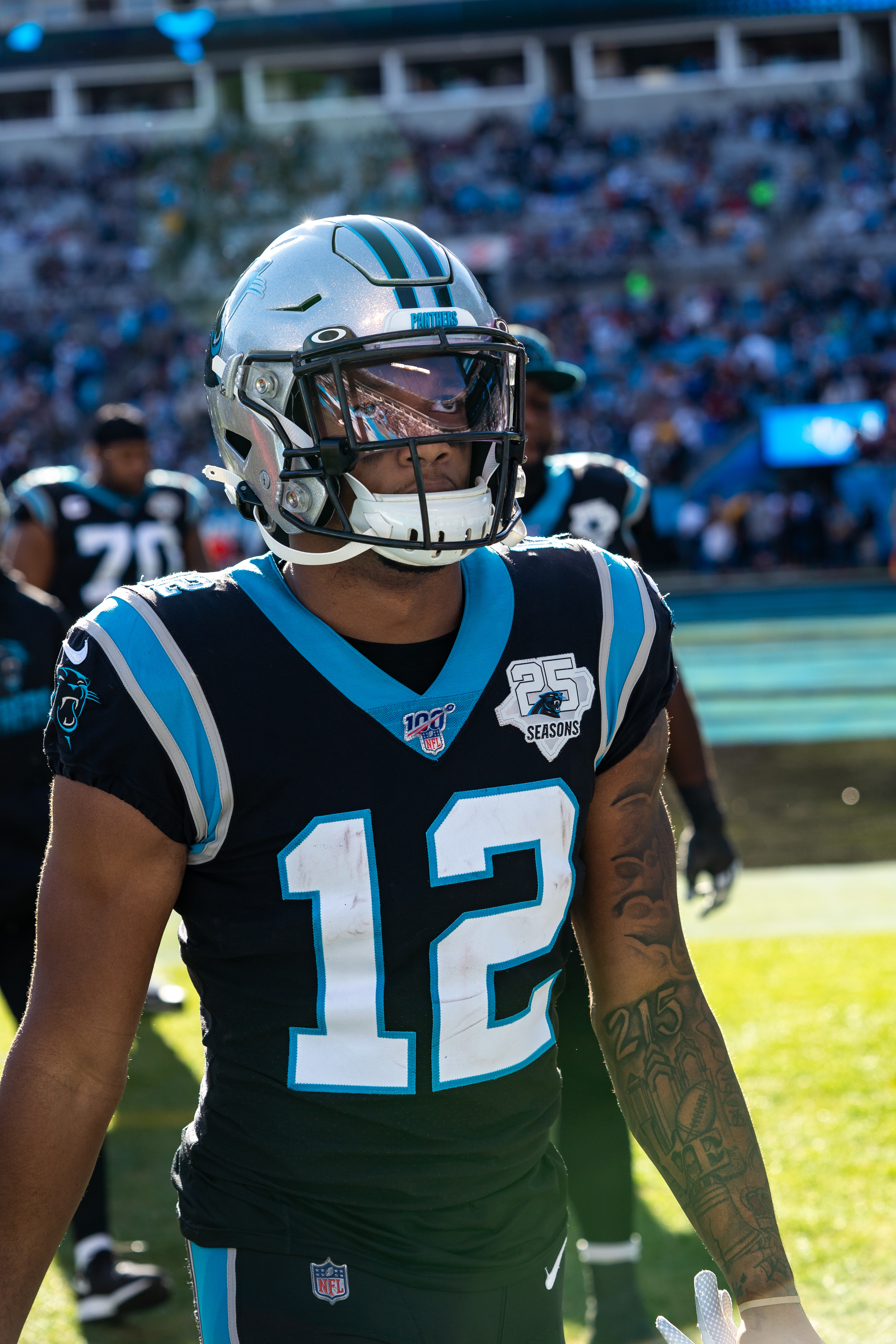
Moore in 2019

In Week 3 against the Arizona Cardinals, Moore caught one pass for a 52-yard touchdown in the 38–20 win. In Week 10 against the Green Bay Packers, Moore caught nine passes for 120 yards in the 24–16 loss. During Week 12 against the New Orleans Saints, Moore finished with six catches for 126 receiving yards and two receiving touchdowns as the Panthers lost 31–34. Overall, in the 2019 season, Moore finished with 87 receptions for 1,175 receiving yards and four receiving touchdowns.

==== 2020 ====
In Week 2, Moore recorded eight receptions for 120 receiving yards in a 17–31 loss to the Tampa Bay Buccaneers. In Week 5 against the Falcons, Moore recorded four catches for 93 yards, including a 57-yard touchdown reception, during the 23–16 win. In Week 7, he had four receptions for 93 receiving yards and two receiving touchdowns in the 27–24 loss to the Saints. In Week 11 against the Lions, Moore recorded seven catches for 127 yards during the 20–0 win. He was placed on the reserve/COVID-19 list by the Panthers on December 7, 2020, and activated on December 16. In Week 15 against the Packers, Moore recorded six catches for 131 yards during the 24–16 loss. Moore finished the 2020 season with 66 receptions for 1,193 receiving yards and four receiving touchdowns.

==== 2021 ====
On April 30, 2021, the Panthers exercised the fifth-year option on Moore's contract. The option guarantees a salary of $11.116 million for the 2022 season. In Week 3, against the Houston Texans, Moore recorded eight receptions for 126 yards in the 24–9 victory. In the following game against the Cowboys, he recorded eight receptions for 113 yards and two touchdowns in the 36–28 loss. Moore finished the 2021 season with 93 receptions for 1,157 receiving yards and four receiving touchdowns.

==== 2022 ====
On March 18, 2022, Moore signed a three-year, $61.9 million contract extension with the Panthers through the 2025 season. In Week 8, against the Falcons, Moore had six receptions for 152 yards and a touchdown in the 37–34 overtime defeat. Moore's touchdown was a 62-yard catch that appeared to set up the Panthers to win the game with only 12 seconds remaining. However, Moore took off his helmet out of bounds and was flagged for unsportsmanlike conduct, which moved the extra point back. The kick was missed and the Falcons later won the game. Moore was off the field when he was penalized and the moment became a controversial topic on whether it should have been flagged. Moore finished the 2022 season with 63 receptions for 888 receiving yards and a career-high seven receiving touchdowns, breaking his three-year streak of 1,000-yard receiving seasons.

=== Chicago Bears ===
==== 2023 ====
On March 10, 2023, the Panthers agreed to trade Moore and the ninth overall pick in the 2023 NFL draft, as well as several other draft picks (including their 2024 first-round pick, later used to draft Caleb Williams), to the Chicago Bears for the first overall pick in the 2023 NFL draft, which the Panthers used to select Bryce Young. The trade was made official when the league calendar year began on March 15. Moore left the Panthers fourth in franchise history with 5,201 receiving yards.

On September 24, during Week 3 against the Kansas City Chiefs, Moore recorded three receptions for 41 yards and a touchdown, his first of the year, during the 41–10 loss.

On October 5, in Week 5 against the Washington Commanders, Moore recorded eight catches for 230 yards and three touchdowns in a Bears victory, with a final score of 40–20. His three touchdowns were a single game career high. His 230 yards is also a career high and the second-most receiving yards for a Bear in a single regular-season game.

In Week 12, Moore surpassed 1,000 receiving yards in a season for the fourth time in a road victory over the Minnesota Vikings.

Overall, Moore had 96 receptions for 1,364 yards and eight touchdowns, all career highs.

==== 2024 ====
On July 31, 2024, Moore and the Bears agreed to a four-year, $110 million contract extension. In addition, the deal made Moore the first receiver in NFL history to have the first 10 years of his career guaranteed.

In Week 5 of the 2024 season, against his former team, the Carolina Panthers, Moore had five receptions for 105 yards and two touchdowns in the 36–10 win. He finished the 2024 season with 98 receptions for 966 yards and six touchdowns.

==== 2025 ====
Moore caught his first touchdown of the 2025 season in Week 3 against the Cowboys. In Week 9 versus the Cincinnati Bengals, Moore threw a two-yard touchdown pass to quarterback Caleb Williams on a trick play where he received a lateral from Rome Odunze before passing to Williams. It was his third career pass and first completion after unsuccessful attempts in 2020 and 2024. He also scored on a 16-yard run in which he was pushed out of bounds and seemingly fumbled the ball through the end zone; the Bengals challenged the play in hopes that it would be a touchback, but the officials ruled he had actually crossed the goal line for the touchdown. The Bears won 47–42.

In a Week 14 loss to the Packers, Moore recorded just one catch for -4 yards; head coach Ben Johnson said he was "surprised" by Moore's performance but planned to get him involved in later games. The following week against the Cleveland Browns, he had two touchdowns, including a 22-yard score in which he leaped over Tyson Campbell and Grant Delpit to catch what was described as a "magic trick" pass from Williams.

In the rematch with Green Bay in Week 16, Moore caught the game-winning 46-yard touchdown in overtime to cap off a five-reception, 109-yard performance. The score was named the NFL Moment of the Year at the 15th NFL Honors.

The Bears finished the regular season 11–6, Moore's first season on a team with a winning record since high school in 2014. In the Wild Card round against the Packers, Moore recorded six catches for 64 yards, including the 25-yard game-winning touchdown with 1:43 remaining in the 31–27 victory.

=== Buffalo Bills ===
On March 11, 2026, Chicago traded Moore, along with a 2026 fifth-round pick (165th overall), to the Buffalo Bills in exchange for a 2026 second-round pick (60th overall, which was traded to the Tennessee Titans and used for their selection of Anthony Hill Jr.).

Moore had a strong debut with the Bills, catching five passes for 100 yards and a touchdown in a Week 1 win over the Houston Texans. However, he suffered a shoulder sprain the following week against the Detroit Lions, causing him to play through pain the next few weeks. Moore was made inactive in Week 5 against the Los Angeles Rams due to his injury, ending his streak of 90 consecutive games played.

== Career statistics ==
Legend
| | Led the league |
| **Bold** | Career high |

=== NFL ===
==== Regular season ====
| Year | Team | Games | | Receiving | | | | | Rushing | | | | | Fumbles | |
| Year | Team | GP | GS | Rec | Yds | Avg | Lng | TD | Att | Yds | Avg | Lng | TD | Fum | Lost |
|---|---|---|---|---|---|---|---|---|---|---|---|---|---|---|---|
| 2018 | CAR | 16 | 10 | 55 | 788 | 14.3 | **82** | 2 | 13 | **172** | **13.2** | **32** | 0 | **4** | **3** |
| 2019 | CAR | 15 | 15 | 87 | 1,175 | 13.5 | 52 | 4 | 6 | 40 | 6.7 | 13 | 0 | 2 | 1 |
| 2020 | CAR | 15 | 14 | 66 | 1,193 | **18.1** | 74 | 4 | 2 | 22 | 11.0 | 21 | 0 | 0 | 0 |
| 2021 | CAR | 17 | 17 | 93 | 1,157 | 12.4 | 64 | 4 | 8 | 48 | 6.0 | 14 | 0 | 1 | 1 |
| 2022 | CAR | 17 | 17 | 63 | 888 | 14.1 | 62 | 7 | 10 | 53 | 5.3 | 11 | 0 | 0 | 0 |
| 2023 | CHI | 17 | 17 | 96 | **1,364** | 14.2 | 58 | **8** | 4 | 21 | 5.3 | 16 | **1** | 1 | 1 |
| 2024 | CHI | 17 | 17 | **98** | 966 | 9.9 | 44 | 6 | 14 | 75 | 5.4 | 14 | 0 | 1 | 1 |
| 2025 | CHI | 17 | 17 | 50 | 682 | 13.6 | 46 | 6 | **15** | 79 | 5.3 | 17 | **1** | 1 | 1 |
| 2026 | BUF | 8 | 8 | 31 | 466 | 15.0 | 49 | 4 | 5 | 24 | 4.8 | 11 | 0 | 1 | 1 |
| Career | | 139 | 130 | 639 | 8,679 | 13.6 | 82 | 45 | 77 | 534 | 6.9 | 32 | 2 | 11 | 9 |

==== Postseason ====
| Year | Team | Games | | Receiving | | | | | Rushing | | | | | Fumbles | |
| Year | Team | GP | GS | Rec | Yds | Avg | Lng | TD | Att | Yds | Avg | Lng | TD | Fum | Lost |
|---|---|---|---|---|---|---|---|---|---|---|---|---|---|---|---|
| 2025 | CHI | 2 | 2 | 11 | 116 | 10.5 | 34 | 2 | 2 | 3 | 1.5 | 8 | 0 | 0 | 0 |
| Career | | 2 | 2 | 11 | 116 | 10.5 | 34 | 2 | 2 | 3 | 1.5 | 8 | 0 | 0 | 0 |

=== College ===
| Year | Team | Games | | Receiving | | | | Rushing | | | |
| Year | Team | GP | GS | Rec | Yds | Avg | TD | Att | Yds | Avg | TD |
|---|---|---|---|---|---|---|---|---|---|---|---|
| 2015 | Maryland | 12 | 10 | 25 | 357 | 14.3 | 3 | 1 | 9 | 9.0 | 0 |
| 2016 | Maryland | 13 | 13 | 41 | 637 | **15.5** | 6 | **11** | 55 | 5.0 | 0 |
| 2017 | Maryland | 12 | 12 | **80** | **1,033** | 12.9 | **8** | 5 | **61** | **12.2** | **1** |
| Career | | 37 | 35 | 146 | 2,027 | 13.9 | 17 | 17 | 125 | 7.4 | 1 |
