= Gabriel Plascencia =

American football player (born 2001)

Profile
- Position: Placekicker

Personal information
- Born: August 2, 2002 (age 24); Oakland, California, U.S.
- Listed height: 6 ft 0 in (1.83 m)
- Listed weight: 245 lb (111 kg)

Career information
- High school: Bishop O'Dowd (Oakland, California)
- College: San Mateo (2021–2022); San Diego State (2023–2025)
- NFL draft: 2026: undrafted

Career history
- Chicago Bears (2026)*
- * Offseason or practice squad member only

Gabriel Plascencia is an American professional football placekicker. He played college football for the San Mateo Bulldogs and the San Diego State Aztecs and he was signed as an undrafted free agent by the Bears in 2026.

== Early life ==
Plascencia attended Bishop O'Dowd High School in Oakland, California, and committed to play college football at the JUCO level for the College of San Mateo.

== College career ==
=== College of San Mateo ===
In two seasons at San Mateo in 2021 and 2022, Plascencia went 26 for 39 on field goals attempts. After the 2021 season, he initially left the team to attend Mississippi State but he would return to the team for the 2022 season. After the conclusion of the 2022 season, Plascencia decided to leave the team and enter the NCAA transfer portal.

=== San Diego State ===
Plascencia committed to play for the San Diego State Aztecs. During his three-year career at San Diego State from 2023 to 2025, he converted on 36 of 41 field goal attempts, finishing with the best field goal percentage of school history. After the 2025 season, he declared for the 2026 NFL draft.

== Professional career ==
Pre-draft measurables
Height	Weight
5 ft 11 1/4 in (1.81 m)	249 lb (113 kg)
All values from Pro Day

Plascencia was signed by the Chicago Bears as an undrafted free agent after the conclusion of the 2026 NFL draft. He was waived by the Bears on June 16, 2026.

== Personal life ==
Plascencia is of Mexican descent.
