= Richard Hightower =

American football coach (born 1980)

Chicago Bears
- Title: Special teams coordinator

Personal information
- Born: September 15, 1980 (age 46); Houston, Texas, U.S.
- Listed height: 5 ft 8 in (1.73 m)
- Listed weight: 185 lb (84 kg)

Career information
- Position: Wide receiver
- High school: Harris County (TX) MacArthur
- College: Texas

Career history
- Houston Texans (2006–2008); Coaching assistant (2006–2007); Special teams assistant (2008); Minnesota (2009) Wide receivers coach; Washington Redskins (2010–2013); Assistant special teams coach (2010–2011); Assistant special teams & defensive backs coach (2012–2013); Cleveland Browns (2014) Offensive quality control coach; San Francisco 49ers (2015) Assistant special teams coach; Chicago Bears (2016) Assistant special teams coach; San Francisco 49ers (2017–2021) Special teams coordinator; Chicago Bears (2022–present) Special teams coordinator

Richard Hightower (born September 15, 1980) is an American football coach currently serving as special teams coordinator for the Chicago Bears of the National Football League (NFL).

== Early life ==
His father, Richard, Sr. was a diesel mechanic and his mother Carolyn, was a medical tech at a blood bank.

He played quarterback in middle school and in high school moved to defensive back and wide receiver because his coaches thought he was too short to play quarterback.

== College football career ==
Hightower went to the University of Texas on an academic scholarship and played college football as a walk-on wide receiver/special teams player, but he played on the kick coverage team. There he met fellow walk-on Kyle Shanahan. He played in every game in his sophomore and junior years. As a senior in 2002, after years of being a walk on, in front of the entire team, coach Mack Brown awarded Hightower, Shanahan and fellow special teams standout Michael Ungar with scholarships. He did not see much playing time, but in 2001 he did recover a fumble against Texas Tech. Following his senior season, then-head coach Mack Brown and his staff voted Hightower the D. Harold Byrd Leadership Award winner.

After graduating with a marketing degree in 2003, Hightower worked for, Link Staffing. He also worked as a marketing intern for the Houston Texans for eight months before finding a full-time marketing job.

== Coaching career ==
In 2006, Hightower joined the Houston Texans as a coaching assistant under head coach Gary Kubiak. He later became a special teams assistant. He went the University of Minnesota in 2009 to coach wide receivers under assistant Tim Brewster. Hightower returned to the NFL in 2010 as an offensive quality control coach for the Washington Redskins, joining his friend and former teammate, Kyle Shanahan, who worked under his father, Mike Shanahan, as the team's offensive coordinator. He would eventually become the team's assistant special teams and defensive backs coach by 2013. Hightower, along with most of Washington's coaching staff was fired following the 2013 season. He followed Kyle Shanahan to the Cleveland Browns, where he worked as an offensive quality control coach.

Hightower bounced between the San Francisco 49ers and Chicago Bears between 2015 and 2016 as an assistant special teams coach. On February 17, 2017 he reunited with Shanahan and the San Francisco 49ers as the team's special teams coordinator. He stayed in San Francisco for five years, helping them make the playoffs twice including a trip to Super Bowl LIV. He returned to the Chicago on February 6, 2022 as the special teams coordinator.

In 2023, Hightower was the head coach of the East team in the 2024 East-West Shrine game, which was won by the West.

In 2024, the Bears fired head coach Matt Eberflus midway through the season. Hightower was the only coordinator retained by the Bears following the hiring of Ben Johnson.
