= Luther Burden III =

American football player (born 2003)

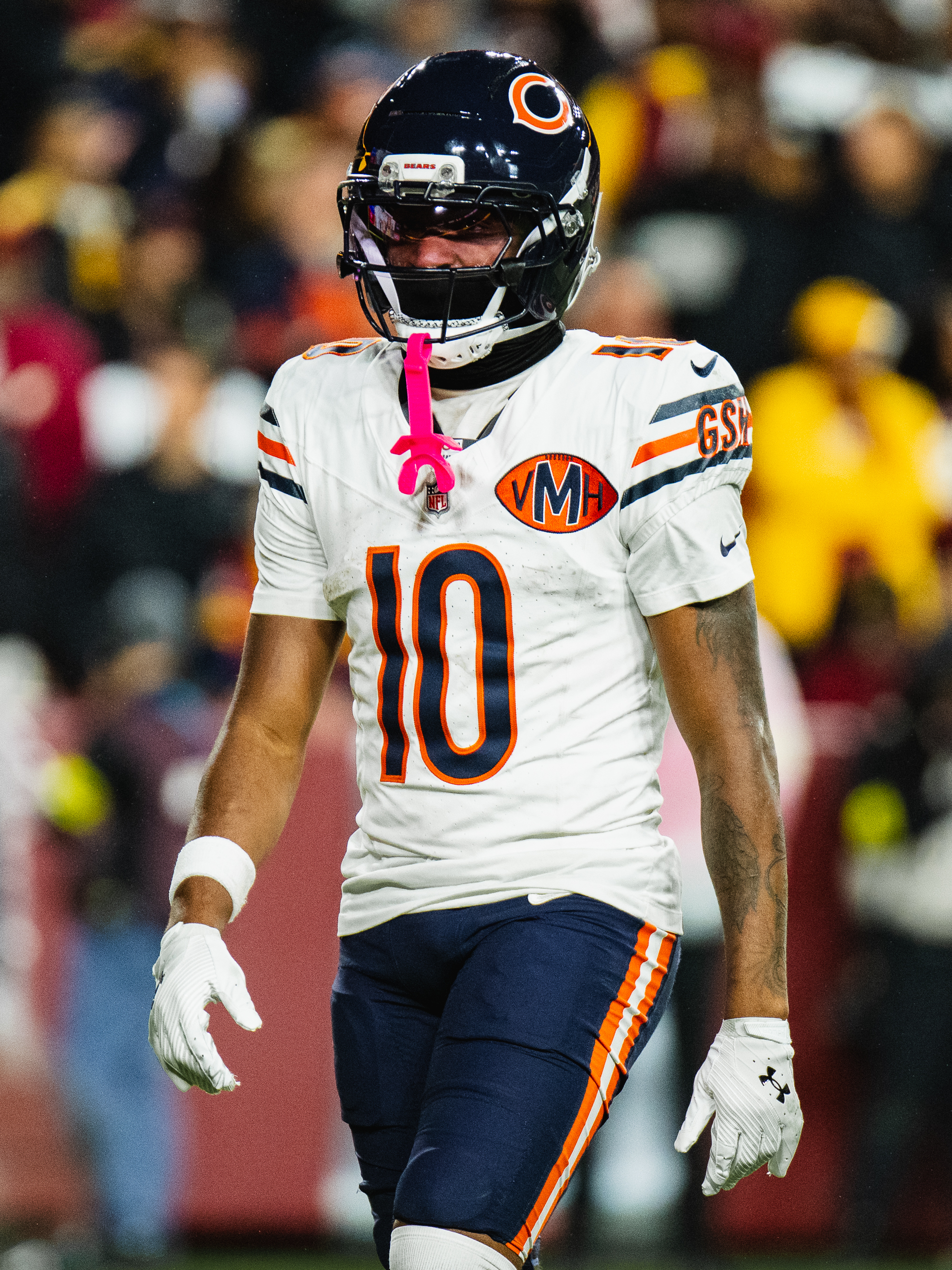
- Burden with the Chicago Bears in 2025

No. 10 – Chicago Bears
- Positions: Wide receiver, kickoff returner
- Roster status: Active

Personal information
- Born: December 12, 2003 (age 22); St. Louis, Missouri, U.S.
- Listed height: 6 ft 0 in (1.83 m)
- Listed weight: 210 lb (95 kg)

Career information
- High school: East St. Louis (IL)
- College: Missouri (2022–2024)
- NFL draft: 2025: 2nd round, 39th overall pick

Career history
- Chicago Bears (2025–present)

Awards and highlights
- 2× First-team All-SEC (2023, 2024)

Career NFL statistics as of Week 7, 2026
- Receptions: 82
- Receiving yards: 1,143
- Receiving touchdowns: 4
- Stats at Pro Football Reference

Luther Burden III (born December 12, 2003) is an American professional football wide receiver and kickoff returner for the Chicago Bears of the National Football League (NFL). He played college football for the Missouri Tigers and was selected by the Bears in the second round of the 2025 NFL draft.

== Early life ==
Burden was born on December 12, 2003, in St. Louis, Missouri, later attending East St. Louis Senior High School. He played both basketball and football and was ranked by ESPN as the top offensive recruit in the class of 2022. 247Sports and Rivals.com ranked him within the top five nationally.

Burden received 41 total college scholarship offers, eventually narrowing his final options to Alabama, Georgia, and Missouri. In October 2021, he committed to Missouri. He was only the fourth consensus five-star recruit signed by Missouri in the past 20 years, after Dorial Green-Beckham, Terry Beckner Jr. and Blaine Gabbert.

== College career ==
Burden made his collegiate debut on September 1, 2022, catching three passes for 17 yards and had two touchdowns, one rushing and one receiving. On September 17, he had a 78-yard punt return for a touchdown against Abilene Christian. In the 2022 season, he had 45 receptions for 375 receiving yards and six receiving touchdowns to go with two rushing touchdowns.

In the 2023 season, Burden led the team with 83 receptions for 1,197 receiving yards and eight receiving touchdowns prior to the bowl game. He had five consecutive games during the season going over 100 receiving yards. On December 2, 2024, Burden declared for the 2025 NFL draft.

== Professional career ==
Pre-draft measurables
Height	Weight	Arm length	Hand span	Wingspan	40-yard dash	10-yard split	20-yard split
6 ft 0 in (1.83 m)	206 lb (93 kg)	31 1/4 in (0.79 m)	8 1/2 in (0.22 m)	6 ft 4 1/2 in (1.94 m)	4.41 s	1.54 s	2.58 s
All values from NFL Combine

Burden was selected by the Chicago Bears with the 39th pick in the second round of the 2025 NFL draft. He began his rookie season as one of the Bears' slot receivers. In Week 3 against the Dallas Cowboys, Burden caught his first touchdown on a 65-yard flea flicker; he ended the 31–14 win with three receptions for 101 yards and seven rushing yards. In Week 17, he had eight receptions for 138 yards and a touchdown in the 42–38 loss to the San Francisco 49ers. He finished his rookie season with 47 receptions for 652 yards and two touchdowns.

Throughout the 2026 season, Burden was tasked with being the primary receiver on quick passes; he was told by a coach to "be the engine" for the offense by "get[ting] everybody going with my play." The year began poorly for Burden as he lost a fumble on the opening drive, but he still caught five passes for 63 yards in the win over the Carolina Panthers. He recorded his first touchdown of the season two weeks later against the Philadelphia Eagles. In Week 7, he had four receptions for 130 yards and a touchdown in the first half as Chicago defeated the New England Patriots. Burden recorded another touchdown at the start of Week 8's victory against the Seattle Seahawks.

== Career statistics ==
=== NFL ===
==== Regular season ====
Year	Team	Games		Receiving					Rushing					Kick return					Fumbles	
Year	Team	GP	GS	Rec	Yds	Avg	Lng	TD	Att	Yds	Avg	Lng	TD	Ret	Yds	Avg	Lng	TD	Fum	Lost
2025	CHI	15	5	47	652	13.9	65	2	6	37	6.2	15	0	8	223	27.9	44	0	0	0
2026	CHI	9	6	49	644	13.1	58	4	8	29	3.6	11	0	0	0	0	0	0	2	1

==== Postseason ====
Year	Team	Games		Receiving					Rushing					Fumbles	
Year	Team	GP	GS	Rec	Yds	Avg	Lng	TD	Att	Yds	Avg	Lng	TD	Fum	Lost
2025	CHI	2	1	6	66	11.0	25	0	2	-4	-2.0	-4	0	0	0

=== College ===
Season	Team	Games		Receiving				Rushing			
Season	Team	GP	GS	Rec	Yds	Avg	TD	Att	Yds	Avg	TD
2022	Missouri	13	10	45	375	8.3	6	18	88	4.9	2
2023	Missouri	13	13	86	1,212	14.1	9	7	31	4.4	0
2024	Missouri	12	10	61	676	11.1	6	9	115	12.8	2
Career		38	33	192	2,263	11.8	21	34	234	6.9	4

== Personal life ==
Burden's grandfather, Luther Burden, played in the ABA for the Virginia Squires and in the NBA for the New York Knicks.
