= Press Taylor =

American football coach (born 1988)

Chicago Bears
- Title: Offensive coordinator

Personal information
- Born: January 13, 1988 (age 38); Norman, Oklahoma, U.S.

Career information
- Position: Quarterback
- High school: Norman
- College: Butler (KS) (2007–2008); Marshall (2009–2010)

Career history
- Tulsa (2011–2012) Graduate assistant; Philadelphia Eagles (2013–2020); Offensive quality control coach (2013–2015); Assistant quarterbacks coach (2016–2017); Quarterbacks coach (2018–2020); Passing game coordinator (2020); Indianapolis Colts (2021) Senior offensive assistant; Jacksonville Jaguars (2022–2024) Offensive coordinator; Chicago Bears (2025–present); Passing game coordinator (2025); Offensive coordinator (2026–present)

Awards and highlights
- Super Bowl champion (LII)
- Coaching profile at Pro Football Reference

Press Taylor (born January 13, 1988) is an American football coach who serves as the offensive coordinator for the Chicago Bears of the National Football League (NFL). He previously held assistant coaching positions with the Indianapolis Colts and Philadelphia Eagles and served as the offensive coordinator for the Jacksonville Jaguars.

== College career ==
Taylor won back-to-back NJCAA national championships at Butler Community College as the starting quarterback. He chose Marshall in the December signing period, knowing Division 1 would appear stronger on his future coaching resume, and served as a backup for the Thundering Herd.

== Coaching career ==
=== Early career ===
Taylor joined the University of Tulsa coaching staff under head coach Bill Blankenship in 2011 as the offensive graduate assistant and quarterbacks coach (Tulsa did not have a full-time QB coach, allowing Taylor to handle those duties). During his 2 seasons at Tulsa, the Golden Hurricane compiled a 19–8 record and won the 2012 Conference USA Championship as well as the 2012 AutoZone Liberty Bowl defeating Iowa State. In 2011, under Taylor's direction, senior quarterback G. J. Kinne was named 2nd Team All-C-USA and threw for over 3,000 yards.

=== Philadelphia Eagles ===
In 2013, Taylor was hired by the Philadelphia Eagles as an offensive quality control coach under head coach Chip Kelly. With the hiring of new head coach Doug Pederson in 2016, Taylor was retained and promoted to offensive quality control and assistant quarterbacks coach under new offensive coordinator Frank Reich. Taylor was part of the coaching staff that won Super Bowl LII and is credited with the "Philly Special" play which gave the Eagles a touchdown in the closing seconds of the first half. After the 2017 season, he was again promoted, this time to quarterbacks coach to replace John DeFilippo, who left at the end of the season to become offensive coordinator for the Minnesota Vikings.

Taylor added the title of passing game coordinator on February 5, 2020, reporting directly to Pederson. He missed the team's week 11 game in 2020 against the Cleveland Browns due to COVID-19 pandemic protocols.

Following the 2020 season, in which the Eagles went 4–11–1, it was reported that Pederson sought to promote Taylor to offensive coordinator, along with other staff changes. However, the Eagles fired Pederson, and Taylor along with the rest of the passing staff was not retained.

=== Indianapolis Colts ===
For the 2021 season, Taylor served as a senior offensive assistant to Indianapolis Colts head coach Frank Reich. They organized a trade to obtain Eagles quarterback Carson Wentz, reuniting three key offensive strategists from the Eagles' Super Bowl winning season.

=== Jacksonville Jaguars ===
On February 17, 2022, Taylor was hired by the Jacksonville Jaguars as their offensive coordinator under head coach Doug Pederson. Taylor split play calling duties in 2022. The Jaguars were 5th in the NFL in second half scoring under Taylor, leading Pederson to making him the full-time playcaller. The Jacksonville Jaguars were a top 10 passing unit in 2022 and 2023 before QB Trevor Lawrence dealt with numerous injuries.

=== Chicago Bears ===
After Pederson was fired by the Jaguars, on January 29, 2025, Taylor joined the Chicago Bears to serve as their pass-game coordinator under new head coach Ben Johnson. The Bears finished 10th in passing in 2025 on their way to capturing the NFC North. On February 18, 2026, Taylor was promoted to offensive coordinator for the Bears, following the departure of Declan Doyle.

== Personal life ==
Taylor grew up in Norman, Oklahoma and is the younger brother of Cincinnati Bengals head coach Zac Taylor. He also has two sisters. Taylor's father, Sherwood, was a defensive back for Oklahoma and head coach Barry Switzer from 1977 to 1979 and a former coach.

Taylor is married to Brooklyn Scheer, whom he met at Tulsa. They have four children as of June 2023.
