= Rome Odunze =

American football player (born 2002)

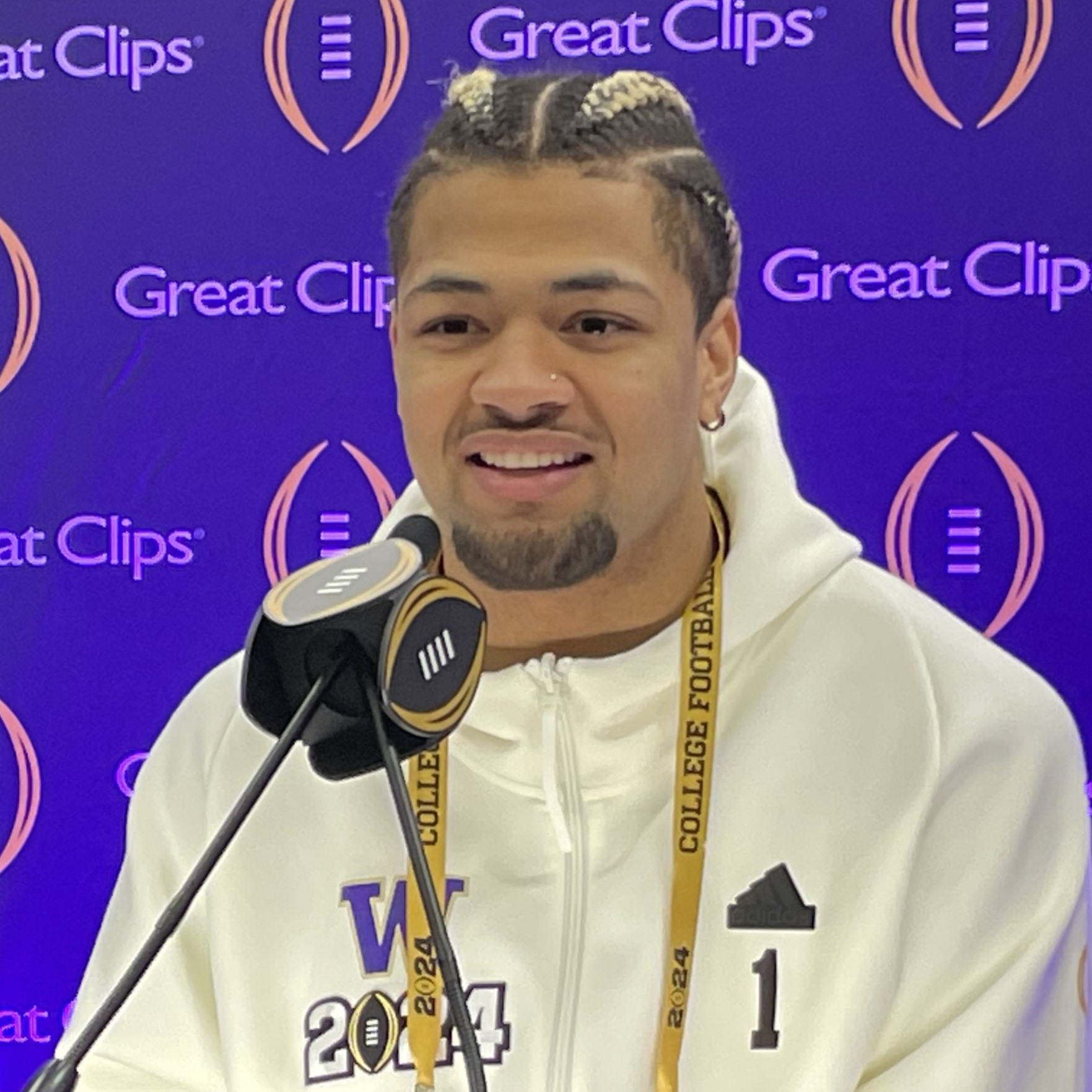
- Odunze with the Washington Huskies in 2024

No. 15 – Chicago Bears
- Position: Wide receiver
- Roster status: Active

Personal information
- Born: June 3, 2002 (age 24); Orem, Utah, U.S.
- Listed height: 6 ft 3 in (1.91 m)
- Listed weight: 214 lb (97 kg)

Career information
- High school: Bishop Gorman (Las Vegas)
- College: Washington (2020–2023)
- NFL draft: 2024: 1st round, 9th overall pick

Career history
- Chicago Bears (2024–present)

Awards and highlights
- Consensus All-American (2023); NCAA receiving yards leader (2023); 2× First-team All-Pac-12 (2022, 2023)

Career NFL statistics as of Week 7, 2026
- Receptions: 122
- Receiving yards: 1,776
- Receiving touchdowns: 9
- Stats at Pro Football Reference

Rome Odunze (oh-DOON-zay; born June 3, 2002) is an American professional football wide receiver for the Chicago Bears of the National Football League (NFL). He played college football for the Washington Huskies, where he was a consensus All-American and runner-up for the national championship in 2023. Odunze was selected by the Bears ninth overall in the 2024 NFL draft.

== Early life ==
Odunze was born on June 3, 2002, in Orem, Utah, later moving to Las Vegas, Nevada, when he was three. He attended Bishop Gorman High School in Las Vegas, where he was named the state's Gatorade Football Player of the Year as a senior in 2019 after recording 54 catches for 1,222 yards and 15 touchdowns. For his career, he had 121 receptions for 2,699 yards and 31 touchdowns. Odunze committed to the University of Washington to play college football. He is of Nigerian descent on his father's side. He credits the summers he spent working on his mom's family farm, in Utah, for teaching him "how to grind."

== College career ==
As a true freshman at Washington in 2020, Odunze played in four games and had six receptions for 72 yards. As a sophomore in 2021, he started seven of nine games, recording 41 receptions for 415 yards and four touchdowns. He returned to Washington as a starter in 2022.

As a junior in 2022, Odunze led the team in receiving yards with 1,145, the fifth-most in single-season history for Washington. He had six games going over the 100-yard mark and three games going over 150 yards. He also led the Pac-12 in receiving yards and was second in receptions per game.

On September 30, 2023, Odunze recovered an onside kick from University of Arizona kicker Tyler Loop and absorbed a hit from safety Dalton Johnson. He revealed later in the season that he had suffered a broken rib and punctured lung on the play. Despite the injury, Odunze played in all 15 games, which included two playoff games, and recorded 92 receptions for 1,640 yards and 13 touchdowns. He had ten games with over 100 receiving yards on the season. He led the NCAA in receiving yards and the Pac-12 in receptions for 2023. He was a finalist for the Biletnikoff Award. Odunze declared for the 2024 NFL draft following Washington's loss in the 2024 College Football Playoff National Championship.

=== Statistics ===
Legend
	Led the NCAA
**Bold**	Career high

Year	Team	Games		Receiving				Rushing				Punt returns			
Year	Team	GP	GS	Rec	Yds	Avg	TD	Att	Yds	Avg	TD	Ret	Yds	Avg	TD
2020	Washington	4	1	6	72	12.0	0	**3**	-16	-5.3	0	0	0	0.0	0
2021	Washington	9	7	41	415	10.1	4	2	13	6.5	0	0	0	0.0	0
2022	Washington	12	8	75	1,145	15.3	7	**3**	6	2.0	**1**	1	0	0.0	0
2023	Washington	**15**	**14**	**92**	**1,640**	**17.8**	**13**	2	**37**	**18.5**	**1**	**2**	**87**	**43.5**	**1**
Career		40	30	214	3,272	15.3	24	10	40	18.5	2	3	87	29.0	1

== Professional career ==
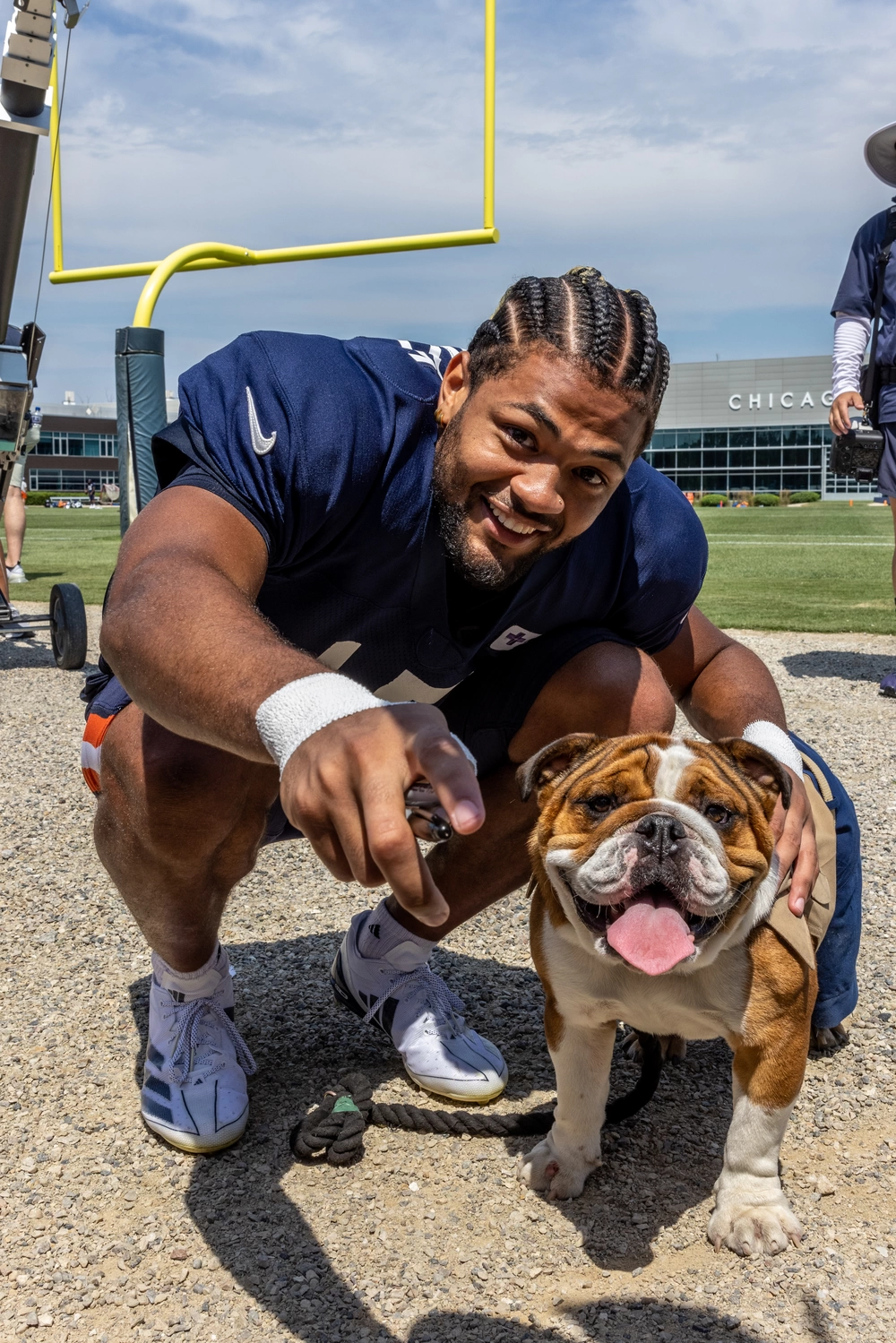
Odunze in August 2024

Pre-draft measurables
Height	Weight	Arm length	Hand span	Wingspan	40-yard dash	10-yard split	20-yard split	20-yard shuttle	Three-cone drill	Vertical jump	Broad jump
6 ft 2 7/8 in (1.90 m)	212 lb (96 kg)	32 1/4 in (0.82 m)	9 1/4 in (0.23 m)	6 ft 4 3/4 in (1.95 m)	4.45 s	1.52 s	2.57 s	4.03 s	6.88 s	39.0 in (0.99 m)	10 ft 4 in (3.15 m)
All values from NFL Combine

=== 2024 ===
Odunze was selected by the Chicago Bears ninth overall in the 2024 NFL draft. On July 16, 2024, Odunze signed his four-year rookie contract with the Bears worth $22.7 million. Odunze scored his first career touchdown with a one-yard receiving touchdown against the Indianapolis Colts. In that game, Odunze caught six passes for 112 yards and a touchdown in the Bears' 21–16 loss. As a rookie, he finished with 54 receptions for 734 yards and three touchdowns.

=== 2025 ===
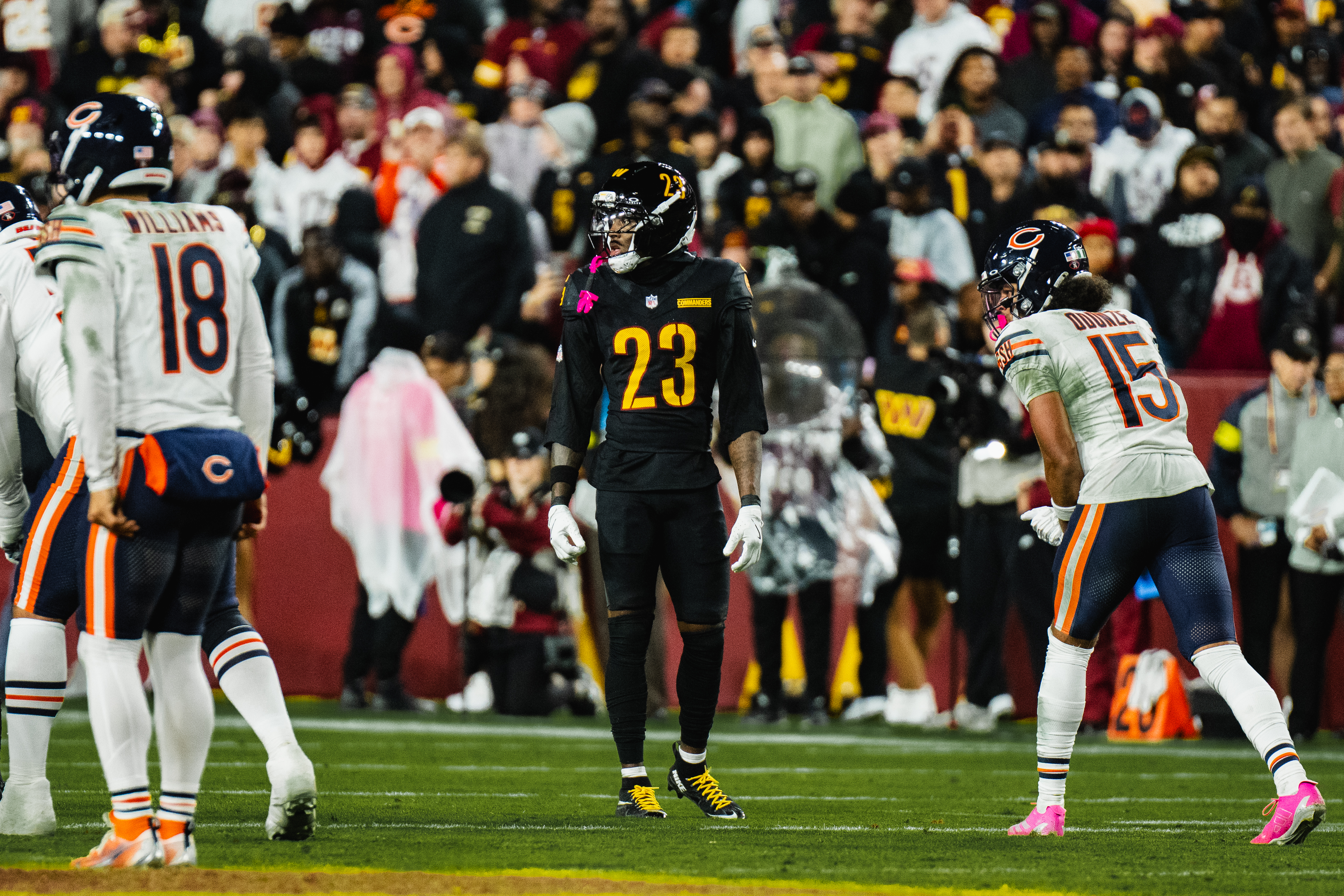
Odunze (#15) playing for the Chicago Bears in 2025.

Odunze finished the 2025 regular season with 44 receptions for 661 yards and six touchdowns in 12 games before missing the final five contests with a foot injury. He posted a career-best performance in Week 2 against the Detroit Lions, hauling in seven catches for a career-high 128 yards and two touchdowns.

== NFL career statistics ==
=== Regular season ===
Year	Team	Games		Receiving						Fumbles	
Year	Team	GP	GS	Tgt	Rec	Yds	Avg	Lng	TD	Fum	Lost
2024	CHI	17	12	101	54	734	13.6	47	3	2	1
2025	CHI	12	12	90	44	661	15.0	37	6	0	0
2026	CHI	7	7	38	24	381	15.9	47	0	1	0
Career		36	31	229	122	1,776	14.6	47	9	3	1

=== Postseason ===
Year	Team	Games		Receiving						Fumbles	
Year	Team	GP	GS	Tgt	Rec	Yds	Avg	Lng	TD	Fum	Lost
2025	CHI	2	2	12	4	88	22.0	27	0	0	0
