= Ben Johnson (American football coach) =

American football coach (born 1986)

Chicago Bears
- Title: Head coach

Personal information
- Born: May 11, 1986 (age 40); Charleston, South Carolina, U.S.
- Listed height: 6 ft 1 in (1.85 m)
- Listed weight: 195 lb (88 kg)

Career information
- Position: Quarterback
- High school: A. C. Reynolds (Asheville, North Carolina)
- College: North Carolina (2004–2007)

Career history
- Boston College (2009–2011); Graduate assistant (2009–2010); Tight ends coach (2011); Miami Dolphins (2012–2018); Offensive assistant (2012); Assistant quarterbacks coach (2013–2015); Tight ends coach (2015); Assistant wide receivers coach (2016–2017); Wide receivers coach (2018); Detroit Lions (2019–2024); Offensive quality control coach (2019); Tight ends coach (2020–2021); Passing game coordinator (2021); Offensive coordinator (2022–2024); Chicago Bears (2025–present) Head coach

Awards and highlights
- Greasy Neale Award (2025); AP NFL Assistant Coach of the Year (2024)

Head coaching record
- Regular season: 18–8 (.692)
- Postseason: 1–1 (.500)
- Career: 19–9 (.679)
- Coaching profile at Pro Football Reference

Benjamin David Johnson (born May 11, 1986) is an American professional football coach who is the head coach for the Chicago Bears of the National Football League (NFL). His NFL coaching career began as an assistant with the Miami Dolphins in 2012, coaching quarterbacks, tight ends, and wide receivers. Johnson later joined the Detroit Lions in 2019, rising to offensive coordinator in 2022 and leading the team to a top-five offense in every season, including the top-ranked during the 2024 season.

In his first season as Chicago's head coach, Johnson led them to an 11–6 regular season record and their first playoff victory since the 2010 season.

== Early life and college ==
Johnson was born in Charleston, South Carolina on May 11, 1986. His father, Don, was a high school principal who coached at Idaho State University and The Citadel, and his mother, Gail, was a middle school teacher.

Johnson attended and played quarterback at A. C. Reynolds High School in Asheville, North Carolina. As a junior, he helped lead the team to a North Carolina 4A state championship, and as a senior, he was named conference player of the year. Johnson graduated in the top five of his high school class.

Johnson was a walk-on for the Tar Heels at the University of North Carolina at Chapel Hill from 2004 to 2007, where he competed as a reserve quarterback. He graduated in 2008 with degrees in mathematics and computer science.

After college graduation, Johnson spent a year outside of football, working instead as a software developer in Durham, North Carolina for the company eTeleNext.

== Coaching career ==
=== Boston College ===
Inspired to get into coaching by his offensive coordinator at UNC, John Shoop, Johnson was hired as a graduate assistant for the Boston College Eagles in 2009. He was promoted to tight ends coach two years later.

=== Miami Dolphins ===
Johnson was hired as an offensive assistant for the Miami Dolphins in February 2012. He was promoted to assistant quarterbacks coach in 2013 and was promoted to tight ends coach in 2015 under interim coach Dan Campbell after head coach Joe Philbin was fired following a 1–3 start. Johnson was retained by new head coach Adam Gase, named assistant wide receivers coach in 2017 and promoted to wide receivers coach the following season.

=== Detroit Lions ===
Johnson was hired as an offensive quality control coach for the Detroit Lions in 2019. He was promoted to tight ends coach in 2020 and was retained after Campbell was named head coach in 2021, following the firing of Matt Patricia. That same season, Johnson would be promoted to pass game coordinator after Anthony Lynn was stripped of play-calling duties following an 0–8 start.

Johnson was promoted to offensive coordinator in February 2022, receiving head-coaching interest by the end of the season after leading the Lions to a top-five offense with eight games over 30 points, a single-season franchise record.

Johnson remained in Detroit for the 2023 season, despite being heavily pursued by the Carolina Panthers, where the team finished third in total offense, won the division for the first time since 1993, and narrowly defeated the Los Angeles Rams 24–23 in the Wild Card Round to win a playoff game for the first time since 1991. The Lions then defeated the Tampa Bay Buccaneers in the Divisional Round to advance to the 2023 NFC Championship Game, where they lost on the road to the San Francisco 49ers. In both the Divisional Round against the Buccaneers and the NFC Championship against the 49ers, Johnson's offense put up over 30 points and over 100 rushing yards. On January 30, 2024, Johnson announced that he would be returning to the Lions despite being considered a prime head-coaching candidate for both the Washington Commanders and Seattle Seahawks.

During the 2024 season, Johnson called the league's top-ranked offense (33.2 ppg) and set multiple records, including most 40-point games without any turnovers (5), and achieving the highest PPG in franchise history. The Lions had six games scoring at least 40 points, and became the first team in NFL history to produce four different players with 1,000 scrimmage yards, with two wide receivers and two running backs. They secured the #1-seed and a bye week in the playoffs, but lost in NFC Divisional Round to the Commanders.

After the regular season, Johnson interviewed with the Chicago Bears, Jacksonville Jaguars, Las Vegas Raiders, and New England Patriots for their vacant head coach positions.

=== Chicago Bears ===
==== 2025 season ====
On January 21, 2025, Johnson was hired as the head coach of the Chicago Bears, replacing Matt Eberflus. He hired Declan Doyle as offensive coordinator and named Dennis Allen as defensive coordinator, while retaining Eberflus' special teams coordinator Richard Hightower; Allen had caught Johnson's interest when he was the New Orleans Saints head coach, while Doyle's role was to help him strategize offensive game plans. Antwaan Randle El and J. T. Barrett also followed Johnson from Detroit as assistant coaches.

Johnson began his Bears tenure with back-to-back losses, blowing an 11-point lead to the Minnesota Vikings and losing 52–21 in his return to Detroit. He recorded his first win in Week 3 against the Dallas Cowboys, whose defense was coached by Eberflus. During November, the Bears won all five games for their first undefeated month since the 1959 team went 5–0 in November. This stretch culminated with a Week 13 victory over the defending champion Philadelphia Eagles, after which Johnson celebrated shirtless in the locker room. The Wieners Circle, a hot dog stand in Chicago, had promised to give away hot dogs if Johnson took his shirt off to celebrate a win; the giveaway was held the following Tuesday. The Bears finished the regular season atop the NFC North with an 11–6 record. Johnson became the third Bears head coach to win 10 or more games in his first season, and the first to win his division since Matt Nagy in 2018.

The 2025–26 NFL playoffs marked Johnson's postseason debut, which began with the Bears defeating the Green Bay Packers in the wild card round for their first playoff win since 2010, making Johnson the first Bears coach to win a playoff game since Lovie Smith. With their win, Johnson became the first head coach in Bears history to win a playoff game in his first season. Following the game, he had a hasty handshake with Packers coach Matt LaFleur. Once he returned to the Bears locker room, he started his postgame speech by proclaiming, "Fuck the Packers! Fuck them. Fucking hate those guys." Johnson defended his conduct as emblematic of the Bears–Packers rivalry, a rivalry "that I fully recognize and I'm a part of." He added, "I just, I don't like that team." Earlier, at his introductory press conference, Johnson said he "enjoyed beating Matt LaFleur twice a year" with the Lions. The Bears' season ended the next week in a 20–17 overtime loss to the Los Angeles Rams.

Johnson concluded his first season as Bears head coach with an overall 12–7 record, including seven comeback victories; he described his team as "[believing] all year long that we could find a way to win each and every week." The Bears also improved in several offensive categories from 2024 such as total offense, going from last to sixth, scoring offense, where the unit ranked ninth after being 28th the year prior, and leading the NFC in rushing yards per game with 144.5.

==== 2026 season ====
Ahead of the 2026 season, the Bears lost Doyle to the Baltimore Ravens and pass game coordinator Press Taylor was promoted to offensive coordinator. Johnson also hired his former Dolphins colleague Eric Studesville to replace outgoing running backs coach Eric Bieniemy.

The Bears began the season in Charlotte, North Carolina, where they defeated the Carolina Panthers 59–37. The teams combined for 55 points in the first half, tying the record for the most points scored in the first half of a Week 1 game in NFL history. Their 96 combined points also set an NFL record for the most points scored in a season opener. Chicago's 59 points were the most the team had scored since 1980 and marked the third-highest point total in franchise history. After starting quarterback Caleb Williams suffered an injury in Week 2, Johnson and the Bears started backups Case Keenum and Tyson Bagent over the next three games and went 2–1. The lone defeat was to the Packers, a 31–7 loss during which a struggling Bagent was replaced by Keenum. Following Williams' return, the Bears enjoyed a winning streak that included beating the New England Patriots and Seattle Seahawks, both of whom played in Super Bowl LX the season prior, in consecutive weeks.

== Head coaching record ==
Team	Year	Regular season					Postseason			
Team	Year	Won	Lost	Ties	Win %	Finish	Won	Lost	Win %	Result
CHI	2025	11	6	0	.647	1st in NFC North	1	1	.500	Lost to Los Angeles Rams in NFC Divisional Game
CHI	2026	7	2	0	.778	TBD in NFC North	—	—	—	
Total		18	8	0	.692		1	1	.500	

== Coaching philosophy ==
Johnson cited his offensive scheme as being influenced by Kevin Rogers, Darrell Bevell, Adam Gase, Clyde Christensen, Mike Martz, and John Shoop.

Johnson has been described as a "perfectionist" who prioritizes attention to detail. Offensive lineman Jonah Jackson, who played for Johnson with the Lions and Bears, noted that "everything he does is very detailed and meticulous". Johnson is also known for aggressive strategic decisions such as frequently attempting to convert fourth downs rather than punt or kick a field goal, a trait he learned under Campbell.

During the 2025 season, Johnson adopted a post-game victory celebration in which he leads the Bears in the following chant: "Good, better best... Never let it rest... until your good gets better, and your better gets best!" He learned the mantra at A. C. Reynolds High School, where it has been a team motto since 1994. In 2026, he added a celebratory gesture similar to the "Stanky Legg"; Johnson had seen his teammates perform the move in high school, then utilized it as an improvisional celebration when beckoned by Bears players to dance.

== Personal life ==
Johnson is married to his high-school sweetheart, Jessica, with whom he has three children.

He is a fan of the Chicago Cubs. His family holds season tickets, which his younger brother applied for in 2007, and he attends at least one Cubs game annually.
