= Dillon Thieneman =

American football player (born 2004)

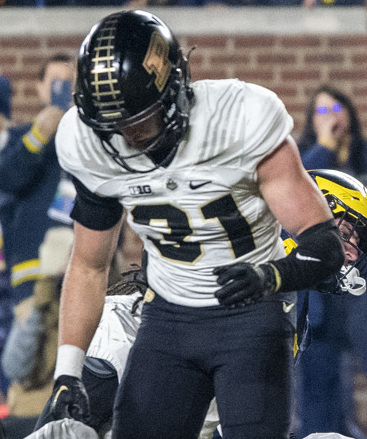
- Thieneman with the Purdue Boilermakers in 2023

No. 31 – Chicago Bears
- Position: Safety
- Roster status: Active

Personal information
- Born: August 8, 2004 (age 22); Westfield, Indiana, U.S.
- Listed height: 6 ft 0 in (1.83 m)
- Listed weight: 201 lb (91 kg)

Career information
- High school: Westfield (Westfield, Indiana)
- College: Purdue (2023–2024); Oregon (2025)
- NFL draft: 2026: 1st round, 25th overall pick

Career history
- Chicago Bears (2026–present)

Awards and highlights
- First-team All-American (2025); Third-team All-American (2023)

Career NFL statistics as of Week 7, 2026
- Tackles: 47
- Sacks: 1.5
- Pass deflections: 5
- Interceptions: 1
- Stats at Pro Football Reference

Dillon Thieneman (/ˈθiːnəmən/; born August 8, 2004) is an American professional football safety for the Chicago Bears of the National Football League (NFL). He played college football for the Purdue Boilermakers and Oregon Ducks and was selected by the Bears in the first round of the 2026 NFL draft.

== Early life ==
Thieneman attended Westfield High School in Westfield, Indiana. In Thieneman's high school career, he totaled 246 tackles with 11 being for a loss, half a sack, 11 pass deflections, five interceptions, and a fumble recovery. Thieneman committed to play college football at Purdue over other schools such as Indiana, Minnesota, and Northwestern.

== College career ==
=== Purdue ===
Thieneman was named a starting safety as a freshman in 2023. In his first career game in the season opener, he recorded ten tackles and an interception, earning Big Ten Conference freshman of the week honors. The following week versus Virginia Tech, Thieneman recorded another interception. In week 6, he recorded eight tackles and an interception in a loss to Iowa. For his performance, Thieneman was named the Big Ten freshman of the week for the second time.

In the final week of the season, Thieneman recorded two interceptions and eight tackles as Purdue defeated Indiana to keep the Old Oaken Bucket. He was named Big Ten freshman of the week for the fifth time, becoming the first defensive player to do so.

Thieneman was named the Thompson-Randle El Freshman of the Year as the best freshman in the Big Ten. He set Purdue freshman records for interceptions (6) and solo tackles (74). On December 11, Thieneman was named a third-team All-American by the Associated Press, one of two freshmen to be named.

On December 4, 2024, Thieneman announced that he would enter the NCAA transfer portal.

=== Oregon ===
Thieneman transferred to play for the Oregon Ducks for the 2025 season. He made 15 appearances for the Ducks in 2025, recording 96 combined tackles, one sack, two interceptions, and five pass deflections. Thieneman declared for the 2026 NFL draft following the season.

== Professional career ==
Pre-draft measurables
Height	Weight	Arm length	Hand span	Wingspan	40-yard dash	10-yard split	20-yard split	Vertical jump	Broad jump	Bench press
6 ft 0 1/8 in (1.83 m)	201 lb (91 kg)	31 3/8 in (0.80 m)	9 in (0.23 m)	6 ft 6 1/8 in (1.98 m)	4.35 s	1.52 s	2.55 s	41.0 in (1.04 m)	10 ft 5 in (3.18 m)	18 reps
All values from NFL Combine

Thieneman was selected in the first round of the 2026 NFL draft with the 25th overall pick by the Chicago Bears. On June 5, 2026, he signed a four-year, $19.51 million contract with the Bears.

In his NFL debut against the Carolina Panthers, Thieneman led the Bears with 11 tackles and helped cornerback Jaylon Johnson force a fumble on Tetairoa McMillan. He recorded his first career interception in Week 3 off Philadelphia Eagles quarterback Andy Dalton's pass into the end zone.

== Personal life ==
Thieneman has two brothers, Jake, and Brennan, who played safety at Purdue.
