= 2025 Chicago Bears season =

106th season in franchise history

- Owner: George McCaskey
- General manager: Ryan Poles
- Head coach: Ben Johnson
- Home stadium: Soldier Field

Results
- Record: 11–6
- Division place: 1st NFC North
- Playoffs: Won Wild Card Playoffs (vs. Packers) 31–27; Lost Divisional Playoffs (vs. Rams) 17–20 (OT)
- All-Pros: FS Kevin Byard (1st team); OG Joe Thuney (1st team); OT Darnell Wright (2nd team)
- Pro Bowlers: FS Kevin Byard; C Drew Dalman; G Joe Thuney; CB Nahshon Wright

Uniform
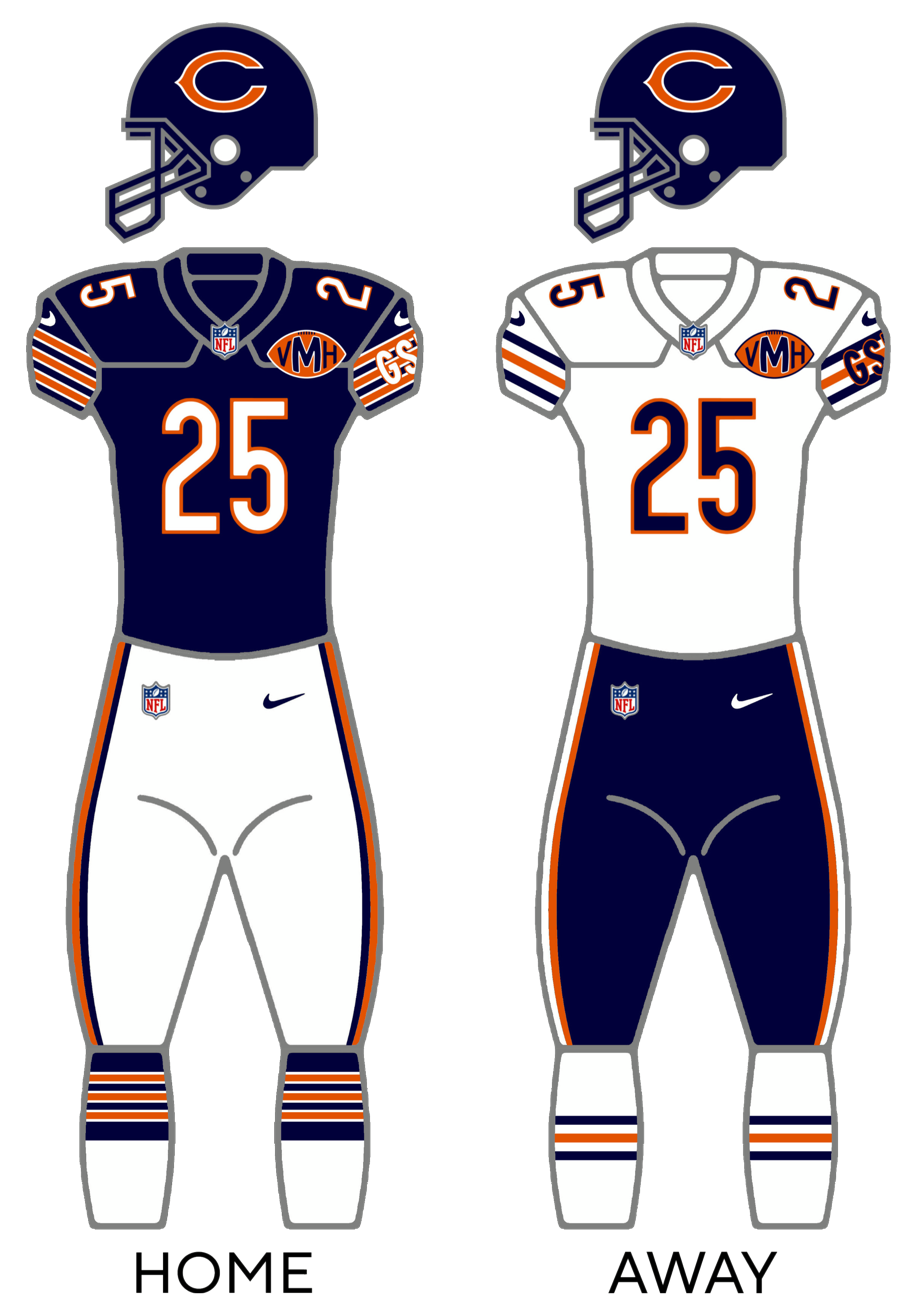

The 2025 season was the Chicago Bears' 106th in the National Football League (NFL), their fourth under the leadership of general manager Ryan Poles and their first under head coach Ben Johnson. This was their first season since 1982 without Virginia Halas McCaskey since she took over as team owner, as she died on February 6, 2025 at the age of 102.

The Bears improved on their 5–12 record from 2024 following a week 10 win against the New York Giants. With a week 13 road win over the defending Super Bowl champion Philadelphia Eagles, the Bears clinched their first winning season since 2018. Their 11–4 start was also their best since doing the same in that season. After a Week 16 overtime win against their longtime rival, the Green Bay Packers, coupled with the Detroit Lions losing to the Pittsburgh Steelers the following day, the Bears secured their first playoff berth since 2020 as well as ending their seven-year NFC North title drought following the Packers' loss to the Baltimore Ravens in Week 17.

The Bears began their playoff run with a 31–27 comeback victory over the Packers in the Wild Card Round after trailing 21–3 at halftime, marking their first playoff win since the 2010 season and their largest playoff comeback since the 1933 season. They advanced to the Divisional Round of the playoffs where they played the Los Angeles Rams. During the game, quarterback Caleb Williams threw a game tying touchdown pass down 17–10 with 18 seconds left in the fourth quarter to send the game into overtime. However, Williams threw his 3rd interception of the game in overtime, and the Bears’ impressive season ended with a 20–17 overtime loss to the Rams.

During the season, Caleb Williams broke Erik Kramer's record for the most single-season passing yards as a Bear with 3,942; the previous record was 3,838.

== Offseason ==
=== Ownership changes ===
Virginia Halas McCaskey, who was the oldest of George Halas' children and the principal owner of the franchise since 1983, died on February 6, 2025 at the age of 102.

=== Staff changes ===
On November 29, 2024, the Bears fired head coach Matt Eberflus after the team was 4–8 and in the midst of a six-game losing streak. It was the first time in franchise history the Bears fired their head coach in the middle of the season. The Bears promoted offensive coordinator Thomas Brown as interim head coach, and under Brown the team went 1–4 in their last five games to finish the year at 5–12. On January 21, 2025, the Bears hired Ben Johnson as their 18th head coach. Johnson had previously been with the Miami Dolphins from 2012 to 2018, working up the ranks as offensive assistant, assistant quarterbacks coach, tight ends coach, assistant wide receivers coach and wide receivers coach. He was then hired by the Detroit Lions in 2019 as an offensive quality control coach before moving up to tight ends coach and passing game coordinator in 2020 and 2021. He took over as offensive coordinator in 2022 under head coach Dan Campbell, and over the next three seasons, he helped make the Lions one of the best offenses in the league – they ranked in the top five in scoring in each of Johnson's three seasons, leading the league in 2024 with 564 points (fourth-most in NFL history and a franchise record).

On February 20, 2025, the Bears announced the full 2025 coaching staff.

=== Roster changes ===
==== Free agents ====
Position	Player	Tag	2025 team	Date signed	Contract	Source
WR	Keenan Allen	UFA	Los Angeles Chargers	August 5	1 year, $8.5 million	
CB	Josh Blackwell	RFA	Chicago Bears	March 6	2 years, $5 million	
T	Larry Borom	UFA	Miami Dolphins	March 13	1 year, $2.5 million	
TE	Stephen Carlson	UFA	Chicago Bears	March 13	1 year, minimum	
WR	DeAndre Carter	UFA	Cleveland Browns	March 19	1 year, minimum	
S	Adrian Colbert	UFA				
S	Douglas Coleman III	ERFA				
DT	Byron Cowart	UFA	New York Jets	March 13	1 year, $1.36 million	
T	Jake Curhan	UFA	Arizona Cardinals	March 14	1 year, $1.17 million	
LS	Scott Daly	UFA	Chicago Bears	March 17	1 year, minimum	
RB	Darrynton Evans	UFA	Buffalo Bills	March 13	1 year, $1.21 million	
DL	Jonathan Ford	ERFA	Chicago Bears	April 8	1 year, minimum	
DE	Daniel Hardy	ERFA	Chicago Bears	April 8	1 year, minimum	
RB	Travis Homer	UFA	Chicago Bears	March 17	1 year, $2 million	
G	Teven Jenkins	UFA	Cleveland Browns	March 20	1 year, $3.05 million	
WR	Collin Johnson	UFA	Las Vegas Raiders	May 1		
CB	Jaylon Jones	RFA	Arizona Cardinals	March 21	1 year, $1.2 million	
C	Doug Kramer Jr.	RFA	Chicago Bears	March 18	1 year, minimum	
TE	Marcedes Lewis	UFA	Denver Broncos	October 29	Practice squad	
DE	Jacob Martin	UFA	Washington Commanders	March 13	1 year, $3 million	
S	Tarvarius Moore	UFA	Chicago Bears	March 10	1 year, $1.17 million	
G	Bill Murray	ERFA	Chicago Bears	April 8	1 year, minimum	
LB	Amen Ogbongbemiga	UFA	Chicago Bears	March 6	2 years, $5.25 million	
G	Matt Pryor	UFA	Philadelphia Eagles	March 27	$1.355 million	
LB	Jack Sanborn	RFA	Dallas Cowboys	March 12	1 year, $1.5 million	
LS	Patrick Scales	UFA				
C	Coleman Shelton	UFA	Los Angeles Rams	March 13	2 years, $12 million	
CB	Ameer Speed	ERFA	Chicago Bears	April 8	1 year, minimum	
DE	Darrell Taylor	UFA	Houston Texans	March 10	1 year, $5.25 million	
WR	Nsimba Webster	UFA				
DT	Chris Williams	RFA	Chicago Bears	April 8	1 year,$3.26 million	
RFA: Restricted free agent, UFA: Unrestricted free agent, ERFA: Exclusive rights free agent Legend – Light green background indicates a player has been re-signed by the Bears. – Light red background indicates a player has departed the Bears.

==== Signings ====
Position	Player	Previous team	Date signed	Contract	Source
TE	Durham Smythe	Miami Dolphins	March 12	1 year, minimum	
DT	Grady Jarrett	Atlanta Falcons	March 12	3 years, $42.75 million	
C	Drew Dalman	Atlanta Falcons	March 13	3 years, $42 million	
DE	Dayo Odeyingbo	Indianapolis Colts	March 13	3 years, $48 million	
WR	Olamide Zaccheaus	Washington Commanders	March 17	1 year, minimum	
WR	Devin Duvernay	Jacksonville Jaguars	March 19	1 year, minimum	
CB	Nick McCloud	San Francisco 49ers	March 24	1 year, minimum	
CB	Shaun Wade	Los Angeles Chargers	April 3	1 year, minimum	
WR	Miles Boykin	Seattle Seahawks	April 3	1 year, minimum	
QB	Case Keenum	Houston Texans	April 4	1 year, $3 million	

==== Trades ====
Position	Player	Team	Date traded	Notes	Source
G	Jonah Jackson	Los Angeles Rams	March 12	CHI receives: Jackson; LAR receives: 2025 sixth-round pick (202nd overall)	
G	Joe Thuney	Kansas City Chiefs	March 12	CHI receives: Thuney; KC receives: 2026 fourth-round pick	

==== Reserve/future contracts ====
The Bears signed the following players to reserve/future contracts: Maurice Alexander (WR), Theo Benedet (OT), Alex Cook (FS), Chris Glaser (OG), John Jackson (WR), Carl Jones Jr. (LB), Jamree Kromah (DE), Joshua Miles (OT), Jordan Murray (TE), Austin Reed (QB), Ricky Stromberg (C), Samori Toure (WR) and Joel Wilson (TE).

==== Releases ====
Position	Player	Date	2025 team	Notes
TE	Gerald Everett	February 21, 2025		
DE	DeMarcus Walker	February 21, 2025		

== Draft ==
2025 Chicago Bears draft selections
Round	Selection	Player	Position	College	Notes
1	10	Colston Loveland	TE	Michigan	
2	39	Luther Burden III	WR	Missouri	from Panthers (Note: The Bears traded a 2023 first-round selection (1st overall) to the Carolina Panthers in exchange for a second-round selection (39th overall), 2023 first- and second-round selections (9th and 61st overall), a 2024 first-round selection (1st overall) and WR D. J. Moore.)
2	41	Traded to the Buffalo Bills (Note: The Bears traded second- (41st overall), third- (72nd overall) and seventh- (240th overall) round selections in exchange for second- (56th and 62nd overall) and fourth- (109th overall) round selections.)			
2	56	Ozzy Trapilo	OT	Boston College	from Bills
2	62	Shemar Turner	DT	Texas A&M	from Bills
3	72	Traded to the Buffalo Bills			
4	109	Traded to the Buffalo Bills			from Bills
4	132	Ruben Hyppolite II	LB	Maryland	from Bills
5	148	Traded to the Los Angeles Rams			
5	169	Zah Frazier	CB	UTSA	from Bills
6	185	Traded to the Seattle Seahawks (Note: The Bears traded a sixth-round selection (185th overall) to the Seattle Seahawks in exchange for LB Darrell Taylor.)			
6	192	Traded to the Cleveland Browns (Note: The Bears traded a sixth-round selection (192nd overall) to the Cleveland Browns in exchange for a seventh-round selection (240th overall) and DT Chris Williams.)			from Dolphins (Note: The Bears traded a seventh-round selection (224th overall) and WR Chase Claypool to the Miami Dolphins in exchange for a sixth-round selection (192nd overall).)
6	195	Luke Newman	OT	Michigan State	from LA Rams
6	202	Traded to the Los Angeles Rams (Note: The Bears traded a sixth-round selection (202nd overall) to the Los Angeles Rams in exchange for G Jonah Jackson.)			from Texans via Steelers (Note: The Bears traded QB Justin Fields to the Pittsburgh Steelers in exchange for a conditional sixth-round selection (202nd overall). The condition – which would have given Chicago a fourth-round selection if Fields played in 51% of the Steelers' snaps in 2024 – was not met.)
7	224	Traded to the Miami Dolphins			
7	233	Kyle Monangai	RB	Rutgers	from Bengals (Note: The Bears traded RB Khalil Herbert to the Cincinnati Bengals in exchange for a seventh-round selection (233rd overall).)
7	240	Traded to the Buffalo Bills			from Vikings via Browns

2025 Chicago Bears undrafted free agents
Name	Position	College	Ref.
Major Burns	DB	LSU	
Xavier Carlton	DL	California	
Power Echols	LB	North Carolina	
Luke Elkin	LS	Iowa	
Deion Hankins	RB	Texas State	
Tysheem Johnson	DB	Oregon	
Jonathan Kim	K	Michigan State	
JP Richardson	WR	TCU	
Jereme Robinson	DL	Kansas	
Jahdae Walker	WR	Texas A&M	

Draft trades

== Staff ==
2025 Chicago Bears staff
Front office: Chairman – George McCaskey; President/CEO – Kevin Warren; General manager – Ryan Poles; Assistant general manager – Ian Cunningham; Vice president of football administration – Matt Feinstein; Senior director of player personnel – Jeff King; Director of player personnel – Trey Koziol; Director of college scouting – Breck Ackley; Assistant director of college scouting - Francis St. Paul; Director of pro scouting – DJ Hord; Head coaches: Head coach – Ben Johnson; Assistant head coach/wide receivers – Antwaan Randle El; Offensive coaches: Offensive coordinator – Declan Doyle; Pass game coordinator – Press Taylor; Quarterbacks – JT Barrett; Running backs – Eric Bieniemy; Tight ends – Jim Dray; Offensive line – Dan Roushar; Assistant offensive line – Kyle DeVan; Offensive assistant (quarterbacks/receivers) – Robbie Picazo; Offensive quality control – Matt Aponte; Offensive quality control – Zach Cable	Defensive coaches: Defensive coordinator – Dennis Allen; Defensive line – Jeremy Garrett; Linebackers – Richard Smith; Assistant linebackers – Kevin Koch; Defensive backs/passing game coordinator – Al Harris; Assistant defensive backs/safeties – Matt Giordano; Senior defensive assistant – Bill Johnson; Defensive assistant (nickels) – Cannon Matthews; Defensive quality control – Kenny Norton III; Special teams coaches: Special teams coordinator – Richard Hightower; Assistant special teams – Anthony Blevins

== Final roster ==
2025 Chicago Bears roster
Quarterbacks (QB): 17 Tyson Bagent; 11 Case Keenum; 18 Caleb Williams; Running backs (RB): 21 Travis Homer; 25 Kyle Monangai; 4 D'Andre Swift; Wide receivers (WR): 10 Luther Burden III; 12 Devin Duvernay; 2 D. J. Moore; 15 Rome Odunze; 20 Jahdae Walker; 14 Olamide Zaccheaus; Tight ends (TE): 85 Cole Kmet; 84 Colston Loveland; 81 Durham Smythe	Offensive linemen (OL): 71 Ryan Bates C; 79 Theo Benedet T; 52 Drew Dalman C; 73 Jonah Jackson G; 70 Braxton Jones T; 74 Jordan McFadden G; 65 Luke Newman LG; 62 Joe Thuney G/T; 58 Darnell Wright T; Defensive linemen (DL): 97 Andrew Billings DT; 94 Austin Booker DE; 99 Gervon Dexter DT; 92 Daniel Hardy DE; 50 Grady Jarrett DT; 90 Dominique Robinson DE; 98 Montez Sweat DE; 93 Joe Tryon-Shoyinka DE; 91 Chris Williams DT	Linebackers (LB): 49 Tremaine Edmunds OLB; 47 Ruben Hyppolite II OLB; 48 D'Marco Jackson MLB; 45 Amen Ogbongbemiga OLB; 16 Jalen Reeves-Maybin MLB; Defensive backs (DB): 39 Josh Blackwell CB; 9 Jaquan Brisker SS; 31 Kevin Byard FS; 35 C. J. Gardner-Johnson FS; 6 Kyler Gordon CB; 22 Elijah Hicks SS; 1 Jaylon Johnson CB; 33 Jaylon Jones CB; 24 Nick McCloud CB; 36 Jonathan Owens SS; 29 Tyrique Stevenson CB; 26 Nahshon Wright CB; Special teams (ST): 46 Scott Daly LS; 8 Cairo Santos K; 19 Tory Taylor P	Practice squad: 13 Maurice Alexander WR; 38 Brittain Brown RB; 88 Stephen Carlson TE; 37 Dallis Flowers CB; 57 Jonathan Garvin DE; 87 Thomas Gordon TE; 45 Dominique Hampton OLB; 60 Kyle Hergel G; 63 Trey Hill C; 80 Qadir Ismail TE (PS/I); 86 Nikola Kalinic TE; 59 Jamree Kromah DE; 27 Dontae Manning CB; 69 Jeremiah Martin DE; 30 Gervarrius Owens FS; 83 JP Richardson WR; 96 Nephi Sewell OLB; 67 Ricky Stromberg C (PS/I); 43 Ty Summers MLB (PS/I); Reserve: 72 Kiran Amegadjie T (IR); 53 T. J. Edwards MLB (IR); 20 Zah Frazier CB (NF-Inj.); 35 Deion Hankins RB (IR); 23 Roschon Johnson RB (IR); 55 Dayo Odeyingbo DE (IR); 44 Noah Sewell OLB (IR); 32 Terell Smith CB (IR); 75 Ozzy Trapilo T (IR); 95 Shemar Turner DT (IR); Rookies in italics 53 active, 10 reserve, 16 practice squad (3 exempt)

== Preseason ==
=== Schedule ===
Week	Date	Opponent	Result	Record	Venue	Recap
1	August 10	Miami Dolphins	T 24–24	0–0–1	Soldier Field	Recap
2	August 17	Buffalo Bills	W 38–0	1–0–1	Soldier Field	Recap
3	August 22	at Kansas City Chiefs	W 29–27	2–0–1	Arrowhead Stadium	Recap

=== Game summaries ===
==== Week 1: vs Miami Dolphins ====
Preseason Week 1: Chicago Bears vs Miami Dolphins – Game summary

Quarter	1	2	3	4	Total
Dolphins	0	14	0	10	24
Bears	0	10	7	7	24

at Soldier Field, Chicago, Illinois

- Date: August 10
- Game time: 12:00 p.m. CST
- Game weather: Sunny, 88 °F (31 °C)
- Game attendance: 43,537
- Referee: Scott Novak
- TV announcers (WFLD/NFLN): Adam Amin, Jim Miller, Stacey Dales, Lou Canellis and Jasmine Baker
- Recap, Game Book

Game information

First quarter

- No scoring plays.

Second quarter

- MIA – Alexander Mattison 1-yard run (Jason Sanders kick), 14:14. Dolphins 7-0. Drive: 9 plays, 45 yards, 2:48.
- CHI — Maurice Alexander 4-yard pass from Tyson Bagent (Cairo Santos kick), 4:43. Tied. 7-7. Drive: 20 plays, 94 yards, 9:33
- MIA — Jaylen Wright 7-yard run (Jason Sanders kick), 1:49 Dolphins 14-7. Drive: 9 plays, 58 yards, 2:53
- CHI — Cairo Santos 57-yard field goal, 0:01. Dolphins 14-10. Drive: 2 plays, 13 yards, 0:06

Third quarter

- CHI – Deion Hankins 4-yard pass from Case Keenum (Cairo Santos kick), 0:25. Bears 17-14. Drive: 6 plays, 3 yards, 2:27.

Fourth quarter

- MIA — Ollie Gordon II 1-yard run (Jason Sanders kick), 11:51. Dolphins 21-17 Drive: 10 plays, 49 yards, 3:31
- CHI — Jahdae Walker 14-yard pass from Case Keenum (Cairo Santos kick), 8:43. Bears 24-21 Drive: 11 plays, 40 yards, 3:10
- MIA — Jason Sanders 56-yard field goal, 6:27. Tied 24-24 Drive: 7 plays, 23 yards, 2:16

Top passers

- CHI – Tyson Bagent – 13/19, 103 yards, 1 TD, 1 INT
- MIA – Zach Wilson – 5/9, 96 yards

Top rushers

- MIA – Ollie Gordon II – 8 rushes, 33 yards, 1 TD
- CHI – Kyle Monangai – 6 rushes, 30 yards

Top receivers

- MIA – Tahj Washington – 3 receptions, 53 yards
- CHI – Jahdae Walker – 3 receptions, 41 yards, 1 TD

==== Week 2: vs Buffalo Bills ====
Preseason Week 2: Chicago Bears vs Buffalo Bills – Game summary

Quarter	1	2	3	4	Total
Bills	0	0	0	0	0
Bears	7	21	3	7	38

at Soldier Field

- Date: August 17
- Game time: 7:00 p.m. CST
- Game attendance: 49,445
- Referee: Clay Martin
- TV announcers (Fox): Joe Davis, Greg Olsen and Pam Oliver
- Recap, Game Book

Game information

First quarter

- CHI – Olamide Zaccheaus 36-yard pass from Caleb Williams (Cairo Santos kick), 11:01. Bears 7–0. Drive: 7 plays, 92 yards, 3:59.

Second quarter

- CHI – Brittain Brown 1-yard rush (Cairo Santos kick), 13:45. Bears 14–0. Drive: 12 plays, 86 yards, 5:50.
- CHI – Tyler Scott 11-yard pass from Tyson Bagent (Cairo Santos kick), 9:42. Bears 21–0. Drive: 5 plays, 61 yards, 2:24.
- CHI – Ian Wheeler 1-yard rush (Cairo Santos kick), 1:50. Bears 28–0. Drive: 12 plays, 84 yards, 5:37.

Third quarter

- CHI – Cairo Santos 40-yard field goal, 8:33. Bears 31–0. Drive: 6 plays, 25 yards, 2:01.

Fourth quarter

- CHI – Ian Wheeler 10-yard rush (Cairo Santos kick), 9:35. Bears 38–0. Drive: 14 plays, 86 yards, 7:36.

Top passers

- CHI – Tyson Bagent – 13/22, 196 yards, 1 TD
- BUF – Mitchell Trubisky – 7/13, 55 yards

Top rushers

- CHI – Ian Wheeler – 19 rushes, 80 yards, 2 TD
- BUF – Frank Gore Jr. – 8 rushes, 51 yards

Top receivers

- CHI – Tyler Scott – 3 receptions, 54 yards, 1 TD
- BUF – Frank Gore Jr. – 4 receptions, 30 yards

==== Week 3: at Kansas City Chiefs ====
Preseason Week 3: Chicago Bears at Kansas City Chiefs – Game summary

Quarter	1	2	3	4	Total
Bears	0	10	0	19	29
Chiefs	10	10	7	0	27

at Arrowhead Stadium, Kansas City, Missouri

- Date: August 22
- Game time: 7:20 p.m. CST
- Game weather: 76 °F (24 °C)
- Game attendance: 73,510
- Referee: Craig Wrolstad
- TV: WFLD/NFLN
- Recap, Game Book

Game information

First quarter

- KC – Isiah Pacheco 2-yard run (Harrison Butker kick), 12:08. Chiefs 7–0. Drive: 8 plays, 69 yards, 2:52.
- KC — Harrison Butker 31-yard field goal, 7:03. Chiefs 10–0. 7 plays, 81 yards, 3:02.

Second quarter

- KC – Rashee Rice 4-yard pass from Patrick Mahomes, (Harrison Butker kick), 14:57. Chiefs 17–0. Drive: 6 plays, 81 yards, 2:29.
- CHI – Cairo Santos 28-yard field goal, 8:46. Chiefs 17–3. Drive: 12 plays, 61 yards, 6:11.
- KC – Harrison Butker 23-yard field goal, 2:45. Chiefs 20–3. Drive: 13 plays, 59 yards, 6:01.
- CHI – Rome Odunze 3-yard pass from Caleb Williams (Cairo Santos kick), 0:28. Chiefs 20–10. Drive: 7 plays, 78 yards, 2:17

Third quarter

- KC — Elijah Mitchell 2-yard run (Harrison Butker kick), 7:59. Chiefs 27–10. Drive: 4 plays, 63 yards, 1:23

Fourth quarter

- CHI – Royce Freeman 2-yard pass from Tyson Bagent (kick blocked), 12:59. Chiefs 27–16. Drive: 11 plays, 59 yards, 6:04.
- CHI – Joel Wilson (American football) 3-yard pass from Tyson Bagent, (pass failed), 4:58. Chiefs 27–22. Drive: 12 plays, 68 yards, 5:59.
- CHI — Jahdae Walker 7-yard pass from Tyson Bagent, (Cairo Santos kick), 0:00. Bears 29–27. Drive: 10 plays, 87 yards, 1:26.

Top passers

- CHI – Tyson Bagent – 20/28, 212 yards, 3 TD
- KC – Patrick Mahomes – 8/13, 143 yards, TD

Top rushers

- CHI – D'Andre Swift – 7 rushes, 28 yards
- KC – Isaiah Pacheco – 3 rushes, 21 yards, TD

Top receivers

- KC – Tyquan Thornton – 1 reception, 58 yards
- CHI – Rome Odunze – 3 receptions, 45 yards, TD

== Regular season ==
=== Schedule ===
On May 12, the NFL announced that the Bears would host their longtime rival Green Bay Packers on Saturday, December 20 as part of a Week 16 double header that aired exclusively on Fox. Later that day, the NFL announced that the Bears would travel to Philadelphia, Pennsylvania on Black Friday to face the Eagles in their Week 13 matchup.

Week	Date	Opponent	Result	Record	Venue	Recap
1	September 8	**Minnesota Vikings**	**L** 24–27	0–1	Soldier Field	Recap
2	September 14	at **Detroit Lions**	**L** 21–52	0–2	Ford Field	Recap
3	September 21	Dallas Cowboys	**W** 31–14	1–2	Soldier Field	Recap
4	September 28	at Las Vegas Raiders	**W** 25–24	2–2	Allegiant Stadium	Recap
5	Bye					
6	October 13	at Washington Commanders	**W** 25–24	3–2	Northwest Stadium	Recap
7	October 19	New Orleans Saints	**W** 26–14	4–2	Soldier Field	Recap
8	October 26	at Baltimore Ravens	**L** 16–30	4–3	M&T Bank Stadium	Recap
9	November 2	at Cincinnati Bengals	**W** 47–42	5–3	Paycor Stadium	Recap
10	November 9	New York Giants	**W** 24–20	6–3	Soldier Field	Recap
11	November 16	at **Minnesota Vikings**	**W** 19–17	7–3	U.S. Bank Stadium	Recap
12	November 23	Pittsburgh Steelers	**W** 31–28	8–3	Soldier Field	Recap
13	November 28	at Philadelphia Eagles	**W** 24–15	9–3	Lincoln Financial Field	Recap
14	December 7	at **Green Bay Packers**	**L** 21–28	9–4	Lambeau Field	Recap
15	December 14	Cleveland Browns	**W** 31–3	10–4	Soldier Field	Recap
16	December 20	**Green Bay Packers**	**W** 22–16 (OT)	11–4	Soldier Field	Recap
17	December 28	at San Francisco 49ers	**L** 38–42	11–5	Levi's Stadium	Recap
18	January 4	**Detroit Lions**	**L** 16–19	11–6	Soldier Field	Recap

Note: Intra-division opponents are in bold text.

=== Game summaries ===
==== Week 1: vs. Minnesota Vikings ====
Week 1: Minnesota Vikings at Chicago Bears – Game summary

Quarter	1	2	3	4	Total
**Vikings**	0	6	0	21	**27**
Bears	7	3	7	7	**24**

at Soldier Field, Chicago, Illinois

- Date: September 8
- Game time: 7:15 p.m. CDT
- Game weather: Clear, 68 °F (20 °C)
- Game attendance: 58,742
- Referee: Alan Eck
- TV announcers (ESPN/ABC): Joe Buck, Troy Aikman, Lisa Salters and Laura Rutledge
- Recap, Game Book

Game information

**First quarter**

- CHI – Caleb Williams 9-yard rush (Cairo Santos kick), 7:04. Bears 7–0. **Drive: 10 plays, 61 yards, 5:41.**

**Second quarter**

- MIN – Will Reichard 31-yard field goal, 12:48. Bears 7–3. **Drive: 7 plays, 67 yards, 3:10.**
- CHI – Cairo Santos 42-yard field goal, 0:24. 'Bears 10–3. **Drive: 9 plays, 35 yards, 4:05.**
- MIN – Will Reichard 59-yard field goal, 0:06. Bears 10–6. **Drive: 2 plays, 28 yards, 0:18.**

**Third quarter**

- CHI – Nahshon Wright 74-yard interception return (Cairo Santos kick), 12:51. Bears 17–6.

**Fourth quarter**

- MIN – Justin Jefferson 13-yard pass from J. J. McCarthy (pass failed), 12:13. Bears 17–12. **Drive: 6 plays, 60 yards, 2:42.**
- MIN – Aaron Jones Sr. 27-yard pass from J. J. McCarthy (J. J. McCarthy-Adam Thielen pass), 9:46. Vikings 20–17. **Drive: 3 plays, 50 yards, 0:51.**
- MIN – J. J. McCarthy 14-yard rush (Will Reichard kick), 2:53. Vikings 27–17. **Drive: 9 plays, 68 yards, 4:31.**
- CHI – Rome Odunze 1-yard pass from Caleb Williams (Cairo Santos kick), 2:02. Vikings 27–24. **Drive: 5 plays, 65 yards, 0:51.**

**Top passers**

- MIN – J. J. McCarthy – 13/20, 143 yards, 2 TD, INT
- CHI – Caleb Williams – 21/35, 211 yards, TD

**Top rushers**

- MIN – Jordan Mason – 15 rushes, 68 yards
- CHI – Caleb Williams – 6 rushes, 58 yards, TD

**Top receivers**

- MIN – Aaron Jones Sr. – 3 receptions, 44 yards, TD
- CHI – D. J. Moore – 3 receptions, 70 yards

In their season opener against the Vikings, the Bears led 17–6 through the first three quarters thanks to a Caleb Williams rushing touchdown and a pick-six by Nahshon Wright. However, they allowed 21 unanswered points in the 4th quarter, including touchdown passes to Justin Jefferson and Aaron Jones Sr., resulting in a 24–27 defeat. With the loss, the Bears started their season 0–1 and lost their sixth straight home game against the Vikings.

==== Week 2: at Detroit Lions ====
Week 2: Chicago Bears at Detroit Lions – Game summary

Quarter	1	2	3	4	Total
Bears	7	7	0	7	**21**
**Lions**	14	14	10	14	**52**

at Ford Field, Detroit, Michigan

- Date: September 14
- Game time: 1:00 p.m. EDT/12:00 p.m. CDT
- Game weather: None (indoor stadium)
- Game attendance: 64,201
- Referee: Land Clark
- TV announcers (Fox): Kenny Albert, Jonathan Vilma and Megan Olivi
- Recap, Game Book

Game information

**First quarter**

- DET – Jahmyr Gibbs 6-yard run (Jake Bates kick), 12:13. Lions 7–0. **Drive: 5 plays, 60 yards, 2:47.**
- CHI – Rome Odunze 28-yard pass from Caleb Williams (Cairo Santos kick), 8:30. Tied 7–7. **Drive: 8 plays, 74 yards, 3:43.**
- DET – David Montgomery 1-yard run (Jake Bates kick), 2:39. Lions 14–7. **Drive: 4 plays, 50 yards, 2:24.**

**Second quarter**

- DET – Brock Wright 8-yard pass from Jared Goff (Jake Bates kick), 4:48. Lions 21–7. **Drive: 8 plays, 67 yards, 4:57.**
- CHI – Rome Odunze 6-yard pass from Caleb Williams (Cairo Santos kick), 1:55. Lions 21–14. **Drive: 7 plays, 57 yards, 2:53.**
- DET – Amon-Ra St. Brown 4-yard pass from Jared Goff (Jake Bates kick), 0:02. Lions 28–14. **Drive: 8 plays, 76 yards, 1:53.**

**Third quarter**

- DET – Jake Bates 34-yard field goal, 10:39. Lions 31–14. **Drive: 5 plays, 60 yards, 3:03.**
- DET – Jameson Williams 44-yard pass from Jared Goff (Jake Bates kick), 6:22. Lions 38–14. **Drive: 3 plays, 46 yards, 1:19.**

**Fourth quarter**

- DET – Amon-Ra St. Brown 8-yard pass from Jared Goff (Jake Bates kick), 14:56. Lions 45–14. **Drive: 7 plays, 84 yards, 4:23.**
- CHI – D'Andre Swift 3-yard run (Cairo Santos kick), 11:45. Lions 45–21. **Drive: 8 plays, 60 yards, 3:11.**
- DET – Amon-Ra St. Brown 4-yard pass from Jared Goff (Jake Bates kick), 7:58. Lions 52–21. **Drive: 6 plays, 43 yards, 3:47.**

**Top passers**

- CHI – Caleb Williams – 19/30, 207 yards, 2 TD, INT
- DET – Jared Goff – 23/28, 334 yards, 5 TD

**Top rushers**

- CHI – D'Andre Swift – 12 rushes, 63 yards, TD
- DET – Jahmyr Gibbs – 12 rushes, 94 yards, TD

**Top receivers**

- CHI – Rome Odunze – 7 receptions, 128 yards, 2 TD
- DET – Amon-Ra St. Brown – 9 receptions, 115 yards, 3 TD

This was Ben Johnson's first visit to Detroit since he left the Lions. With the blowout loss, the Bears fell to 0–2 overall and against the NFC North.

==== Week 3: vs. Dallas Cowboys ====
Week 3: Dallas Cowboys at Chicago Bears – Game summary

Quarter	1	2	3	4	Total
Cowboys	3	11	0	0	**14**
**Bears**	14	10	7	0	**31**

at Soldier Field, Chicago, Illinois

- Date: September 21
- Game time: 3:25 p.m. CDT
- Game weather: Mostly sunny, 82 °F (28 °C)
- Game attendance: 58,389
- Referee: Clay Martin
- TV announcers (Fox): Kevin Burkhardt, Tom Brady, Erin Andrews and Tom Rinaldi
- Recap, Game Book

Game information

**First quarter**

- CHI – Rome Odunze 35-yard pass from Caleb Williams (Cairo Santos kick), 10:35. Bears 7–0. **Drive: 5 plays, 76 yards, 1:56.**
- DAL – Brandon Aubrey 53-yard field goal, 4:21. Bears 7–3. **Drive: 11 plays, 46 yards, 6:14.**
- CHI – Luther Burden III 65-yard pass from Caleb Williams (Cairo Santos kick), 4:10. Bears 14–3. **Drive: 1 play, 65 yards, 0:11.**

**Second quarter**

- DAL – Brandon Aubrey 33-yard field goal, 13:49. Bears 14–6. **Drive: 10 plays, 50 yards, 5:21.**
- DAL – George Pickens 2-yard pass from Dak Prescott (Dak Prescott–Jalen Tolbert pass), 7:57. Tied 14–14. **Drive: 7 plays, 57 yards, 4:12.**
- CHI – Cairo Santos 30-yard field goal, 4:15. Bears 17–14. **Drive: 8 plays, 54 yards, 3:42.**
- CHI – Cole Kmet 10-yard pass from Caleb Williams (Cairo Santos kick), 0:25. Bears 24–14. **Drive: 7 plays, 71 yards, 2:00.**

**Third quarter**

- CHI – D. J. Moore 4-yard pass from Caleb Williams (Cairo Santos kick), 0:09. Bears 31–14. **Drive: 19 plays, 76 yards, 9:54.**

**Fourth quarter**

- No scoring plays

**Top passers**

- DAL – Dak Prescott – 31/40, 251 yards, TD, 2 INT
- CHI – Caleb Williams – 19/28, 298 yards, 4 TD

**Top rushers**

- DAL – Javonte Williams – 10 rushes, 76 yards
- CHI – D'Andre Swift – 13 rushes, 33 yards

**Top receivers**

- DAL – Jake Ferguson – 13 receptions, 82 yards
- CHI – Luther Burden III – 3 receptions, 101 yards, TD

This was their first win under head coach Ben Johnson. With the win, the Bears improved to 1–2 and 1–0 against the NFC East.

==== Week 4: at Las Vegas Raiders ====
Week 4: Chicago Bears at Las Vegas Raiders – Game summary

Quarter	1	2	3	4	Total
**Bears**	3	6	7	9	**25**
Raiders	7	7	7	3	**24**

at Allegiant Stadium, Paradise, Nevada

- Date: September 28
- Game time: 3:25 p.m. CDT/1:25 p.m. PDT
- Game weather: None (indoor stadium)
- Game attendance: 62,642
- Referee: Adrian Hill
- TV announcers (CBS): Spero Dedes, Adam Archuleta and Aditi Kinkhabwala
- Recap, Game Book

Game information

**First quarter**

- CHI – Cairo Santos 46-yard field goal, 9:53. Bears 3–0. **Drive: 4 plays, -4 yards, 0:55.**
- LV – Ashton Jeanty 8-yard pass from Geno Smith (Daniel Carlson kick), 0:08. Raiders 7–3. **Drive: 7 plays, 66 yards, 4:08.**

**Second quarter**

- CHI – Cairo Santos 43-yard field goal, 4:22. Raiders 7–6. **Drive: 8 plays, -1 yard, 4:26.**
- LV – Ashton Jeanty 64-yard run (Daniel Carlson kick), 4:03. Raiders 14–6. **Drive: 1 play, 64 yards, 0:19.**
- CHI – Cairo Santos 52-yard field goal, 0:53. Raiders 14–9. **Drive: 9 plays, 37 yards, 3:10.**

**Third quarter**

- CHI – Rome Odunze 27-yard pass from Caleb Williams (Cairo Santos kick), 11:38. Bears 16–14. **Drive: 7 plays, 40 yards, 3:04.**
- LV – Ashton Jeanty 9-yard pass from Geno Smith (Daniel Carlson kick), 5:23. Raiders 21–16. **Drive: 10 plays, 80 yards, 6:15.**

**Fourth quarter**

- CHI – Cairo Santos 51-yard field goal, 11:38. Raiders 21–19. **Drive: 8 plays, 16 yards, 4:29.**
- LV – Daniel Carlson 29-yard field goal, 6:45. Raiders 24–19. **Drive: 9 plays, 63 yards, 4:53.**
- CHI – D'Andre Swift 2-yard run (pass failed), 1:34. Bears 25–24. **Drive: 11 plays, 69 yards, 5:11.**

**Top passers**

- CHI – Caleb Williams – 22/37, 212 yards, TD, INT
- LV – Geno Smith – 14/21, 117 yards, 2 TD, 3 INT

**Top rushers**

- CHI – D'Andre Swift – 14 rushes, 38 yards, TD
- LV – Ashton Jeanty – 21 rushes, 138 yards, TD

**Top receivers**

- CHI – Rome Odunze – 4 receptions, 69 yards, TD
- LV – Brock Bowers – 5 receptions, 46 yards

The Bears blocked an attempted game-winning field goal by the Raiders to secure their 800th win in franchise history.

==== Week 6: at Washington Commanders ====
Week 6: Chicago Bears at Washington Commanders – Game summary

Quarter	1	2	3	4	Total
**Bears**	6	7	3	9	**25**
Commanders	0	7	10	7	**24**

at Northwest Stadium, Landover, Maryland

- Date: October 13
- Game time: 8:15 p.m. EDT/7:15 p.m. CDT
- Game weather: Cloudy, 59 °F (15 °C)
- Game attendance: 64,457
- Referee: Alex Moore
- TV announcers (ABC): Joe Buck, Troy Aikman, Lisa Salters and Laura Rutledge
- Recap, Game Book

Game information

**First quarter**

- CHI – Jake Moody 47-yard field goal, 10:41. Bears 3–0. **Drive: 9 plays, 41 yards, 4:19.**
- CHI – Jake Moody 48-yard field goal, 2:27. Bears 6–0. **Drive: 8 plays, 36 yards, 3:39.**

**Second quarter**

- CHI – Caleb Williams 1-yard run (Jake Moody kick), 14:18. Bears 13–0. **Drive: 5 plays, 35 yards, 2:41.**
- WAS – Chris Moore 22-yard pass from Jayden Daniels (Matt Gay kick), 9:28. Bears 13–7. **Drive: 8 plays, 65 yards, 4:50.**

**Third quarter**

- WAS – Matt Gay 53-yard field goal, 11:59. Bears 13–10. **Drive: 8 plays, 25 yards, 3:01.**
- CHI – Jake Moody 41-yard field goal, 8:05. Bears 16–10. **Drive: 8 plays, 62 yards, 3:54.**
- WAS – Luke McCaffrey 33-yard pass from Jayden Daniels (Matt Gay kick), 2:56. Commanders 17–16. **Drive: 9 plays, 84 yards, 5:09.**

**Fourth quarter**

- WAS – Zach Ertz 6-yard pass from Jayden Daniels (Matt Gay kick), 11:27. Commanders 24–16. **Drive: 6 plays, 63 yards, 3:28.**
- CHI – D'Andre Swift 55-yard pass from Caleb Williams (pass failed), 10:26. Commanders 24–22. **Drive: 3 plays, 61 yards, 1:01.**
- CHI – Jake Moody 38-yard field goal, 0:00. Bears 25–24. **Drive: 9 plays, 36 yards, 3:07.**

**Top passers**

- CHI – Caleb Williams – 17/29, 252 yards, TD
- WAS – Jayden Daniels – 19/26, 211 yards, 3 TD, INT

**Top rushers**

- CHI – D'Andre Swift – 14 rushes, 108 yards
- WAS – Jacory Croskey-Merritt – 17 rushes, 61 yards

**Top receivers**

- CHI – D'Andre Swift – 2 receptions, 67 yards, TD
- WAS – Chris Moore – 3 receptions, 46 yards, TD

Running back D'Andre Swift rushed for 108 yards on 14 carries and added two receptions for 67 yards, including a 55-yard catch-and-run touchdown. Kicker Jake Moody, who was activated from the Bears' practice squad, converted four of five field goal attempts, including the game-winner, as the Bears avenged their last-second loss to the Commanders from the previous season.

==== Week 7: vs. New Orleans Saints ====
Week 7: New Orleans Saints at Chicago Bears – Game summary

Quarter	1	2	3	4	Total
Saints	0	7	7	0	**14**
**Bears**	3	17	3	3	**26**

at Soldier Field, Chicago, Illinois

- Date: October 19
- Game time: 12:00 p.m. CDT
- Game weather: Cloudy, 49 °F (9 °C)
- Game attendance: 58,102
- Referee: Scott Novak
- TV announcers (Fox): Kevin Kugler, Daryl Johnston and Allison Williams
- Recap, Game Book

Game information

**First quarter**

- CHI – Jake Moody 27-yard field goal, 9:34. Bears 3–0. **Drive: 6 plays, 15 yards, 3:21.**

**Second quarter**

- CHI – Jake Moody 39-yard field goal, 14:06. Bears 6–0. **Drive: 9 plays, 35 yards, 3:49.**
- CHI – D'Andre Swift 11-yard run (Jake Moody kick), 9:05. Bears 13–0. **Drive: 4 plays, 30 yards, 2:01.**
- CHI – Kyle Monangai 1-yard run (Jake Moody kick), 2:51. Bears 20–0. **Drive: 8 plays, 55 yards, 4:35.**
- NO – Chris Olave 21-yard pass from Spencer Rattler (Blake Grupe kick), 0:22. Bears 20–7. **Drive: 5 plays, 91 yards, 0:46.**

**Third quarter**

- NO – Chris Olave 14-yard pass from Spencer Rattler (Blake Grupe kick), 9:40. Bears 20–14. **Drive: 10 plays, 80 yards, 5:20.**
- CHI – Jake Moody 24-yard field goal, 4:07. Bears 23–14. **Drive: 8 plays, 66 yards, 5:33.**

**Fourth quarter**

- CHI – Jake Moody 33-yard field goal, 6:22. Bears 26–14. **Drive: 8 plays, 51 yards, 4:18.**

**Top passers**

- NO – Spencer Rattler – 20/32, 233 yards, 2 TD, 3 INT
- CHI – Caleb Williams – 15/26, 172 yards, INT

**Top rushers**

- NO – Alvin Kamara – 11 rushes, 28 yards
- CHI – D'Andre Swift – 19 rushes, 124 yards, TD

**Top receivers**

- NO – Chris Olave – 5 receptions, 98 yards, 2 TD
- CHI – D. J. Moore – 3 receptions, 43 yards

The Bears snapped their eight-game losing streak against the Saints, beating them for the first time since the 2008 season. This also marked the Bears first four-game win streak since 2018.

==== Week 8: at Baltimore Ravens ====
Week 8: Chicago Bears at Baltimore Ravens – Game summary

Quarter	1	2	3	4	Total
Bears	6	0	0	10	**16**
**Ravens**	0	10	6	14	**30**

at M&T Bank Stadium, Baltimore, Maryland

- Date: October 26
- Game time: 1:00 p.m. EDT/12:00 p.m. CDT
- Game weather: Clear, 60 °F (16 °C)
- Game attendance: 70,045
- Referee: Shawn Smith
- TV announcers (CBS): Ian Eagle, J. J. Watt and Evan Washburn
- Recap, Game Book

Game information

**First quarter**

- CHI – Cairo Santos 32-yard field goal, 6:50. Bears 6–0. **Drive: 13 plays, 64 yards, 8:10.**
- CHI – Cairo Santos 39-yard field goal, 0:03. Bearss 6–0. **Drive: 11 plays, 61 yards, 4:31.**

**Second quarter**

- BAL – Derrick Henry 2-yard run (Tyler Loop kick), 8:15. Ravens 7–6. **Drive: 12 plays, 62 yards, 6:48.**
- BAL – Tyler Loop 42-yard field goal, 1:06. Ravens 10–6. **Drive: 12 plays, 54 yards, 5:27.**

**Third quarter**

- BAL – Tyler Loop 28-yard field goal, 10:05. Ravens 13–6. **Drive: 8 plays, 56 yards, 4:55.**
- BAL – Tyler Loop 32-yard field goal, 3:35. Ravens 16–6. **Drive: 10 plays, 76 yards, 4:22.**

**Fourth quarter**

- CHI – D'Andre Swift 2-yard rush (Cairo Santos kick), 12:22. Ravens 16–13. **Drive: 11 plays, 83 yards, 6:13.**
- BAL – Charlie Kolar 10-yard pass from Tyler Huntley (Tyler Loop kick), 8:13. Ravens 23–13. **Drive: 2 plays, 9 yards, 0:47.**
- CHI – Cairo Santos 47-yard field goal, 5:06. Ravens 23–16. **Drive: 10 plays, 48 yards, 3:07.**
- BAL – Derrick Henry 2-yard run (Tyler Loop kick), 2:09. Ravens 30–16. **Drive: 9 plays, 66 yards, 2:57.**

**Top passers**

- CHI – Caleb Williams – 25/38, 285 yards, INT
- BAL – Tyler Huntley – 17/22, 186 yards, TD

**Top rushers**

- CHI – D'Andre Swift – 11 rushes, 45 yards, TD
- BAL – Derrick Henry – 21 rushes, 71 yards, 2 TD

**Top receivers**

- CHI – Rome Odunze – 7 receptions, 114 yards
- BAL – Zay Flowers – 7 receptions, 63 yards

With the loss, the Bears fell to 4–3 for the second year in a row.

==== Week 9: at Cincinnati Bengals ====
Week 9: Chicago Bears at Cincinnati Bengals – Game summary

Quarter	1	2	3	4	Total
**Bears**	7	10	14	16	**47**
Bengals	10	10	7	15	**42**

at Paycor Stadium, Cincinnati, Ohio

- Date: November 2
- Game time: 1:00 p.m. EST/12:00 p.m. CST
- Game weather: Cloudy, 50 °F (10 °C)
- Game attendance: 66,264
- Referee: Clete Blakeman
- TV announcers (CBS): Spero Dedes, Adam Archuleta and Aditi Kinkhabwala
- Recap, Game Book

Game information

**First quarter**

- CIN – Charlie Jones 98-yard kickoff return (Evan McPherson kick), 14:49. Bengals 7–0.
- CHI – Caleb Williams 2-yard pass from D. J. Moore (Cairo Santos kick), 8:44. Tied 7–7. **Drive: 12 plays, 73 yards, 6:05.**
- CIN – Evan McPherson 41-yard field goal, 5:41. Bengals 10–7. **Drive: 7 plays, 32 yards, 3:03.**

**Second quarter**

- CHI – Olamide Zaccheaus 15-yard pass from Caleb Williams (Cairo Santos kick), 14:54. Bears 14–10. **Drive: 11 plays, 74 yards, 5:47.**
- CIN – Evan McPherson 33-yard field goal, 5:47. Bears 14–13. **Drive: 11 plays, 70 yards, 4:20.**
- CHI – Cairo Santos 24-yard field goal, 1:29. Bears 17–13. **Drive: 11 plays, 59 yards, 4:18.**
- CIN – Tee Higgins 44-yard pass from Joe Flacco (Evan McPherson kick), 1:12. Bengals 20–17. **Drive: 2 plays, 63 yards, 0:17.**

**Third quarter**

- CHI – Colston Loveland 5-yard pass from Caleb Williams (Cairo Santos kick), 8:11. Bears 24–20. **Drive: 12 plays, 77 yards, 6:49.**
- CIN – Tee Higgins 2-yard pass from Joe Flacco (Evan McPherson kick), 5:19. Bengals 27–24. **Drive: 6 plays, 69 yards, 2:52.**
- CHI – Brittain Brown 22-yard run (Cairo Santos kick), 1:57. Bears 31–27. **Drive: 6 plays, 74 yards, 3:22.**

**Fourth quarter**

- CHI – Cairo Santos 36-yard field goal, 12:03. Bears 34–27. **Drive: 5 plays, 20 yards, 2:51.**
- CHI – D. J. Moore 17-yard run (Cairo Santos kick), 4:53. Bears 41–27. **Drive: 2 plays, 56 yards, 1:00.**
- CIN – Noah Fant 23-yard pass from Joe Flacco (Joe Flacco–Tee Higgins pass), 1:43. Bears 41–35. **Drive: 4 plays, 55 yards, 0:32.**
- CIN – Andrei Iosivas 9-yard pass from Joe Flacco (Evan McPherson kick), 0:54. Bengals 42–41. **Drive: 6 plays, 57 yards, 0:49.**
- CHI – Colston Loveland 58-yard pass from Caleb Williams (pass failed), 0:17. Bears 47–42. **Drive: 4 plays, 72 yards, 0:37.**

**Top passers**

- CHI – Caleb Williams – 20/34, 280 yards, 3 TD
- CIN – Joe Flacco – 31/47, 470 yards, 4 TD, 2 INT

**Top rushers**

- CHI – Kyle Monangai – 26 rushes, 176 yards
- CIN – Chase Brown – 11 rushes, 37 yards

**Top receivers**

- CHI – Colston Loveland – 6 receptions, 118 yards, 2 TD
- CIN – Tee Higgins – 7 receptions, 121 yards, 2 TD

The Bears appeared to seal the game when D. J. Moore scored a 16-yard touchdown to make it 41–27 with 4:53 remaining. However, Bengals' quarterback Joe Flacco led the Bengals on a four-play touchdown drive that concluded with a 23-yard touchdown pass to tight ends Noah Fant with 1:43 left. Bengals' wide receiver Tee Higgins then caught a two-point conversion to trim the Bears' lead to 41–35. The Bengals successfully executed an onside kick that deflected off the leg of Daniel Hardy and was recovered by defensive end Joseph Ossai. With 49 seconds remaining, the Bengals took a one-point lead after Flacco threw a nine-yard touchdown pass to wide receiver Andrei Iosivas. On the ensuing drive, Caleb Williams connected with Colston Loveland for a 58-yard touchdown with 17 seconds left, giving Chicago a 47–42 victory and thwarting the Bengals’ comeback attempt. Williams and the Bears offense had one of their better offensive performances, accumulating 576 total yards of offense. With a comeback win, the Bears secure their fourth win over Cincinnati since 2013 and improve to their first 5–3 start since 2020.

Williams became the first starting quarterback with more than one reception in a game since George Taliaferro of the 1953 Baltimore Colts.

==== Week 10: vs. New York Giants ====
Week 10: New York Giants at Chicago Bears – Game summary

Quarter	1	2	3	4	Total
Giants	0	10	7	3	**20**
**Bears**	7	0	3	14	**24**

at Soldier Field, Chicago, Illinois

- Date: November 9
- Game time: 12:00 p.m. CST
- Game weather: Light snow, 33 °F (1 °C)
- Game attendance: 58,884
- Referee: Adrian Hill
- TV announcers (Fox): Joe Davis, Greg Olsen and Pam Oliver
- Recap, Game Book

Game information

**First quarter**

- CHI – Kyle Monangai 8-yard run (Cairo Santos kick), 5:40. Bears 7–0. **Drive: 8 plays, 47 yards, 3:42.**

**Second quarter**

- NYG – Jaxson Dart 3-yard run (Younghoe Koo kick), 13:06. Tied 7–7. **Drive: 6 plays, 80 yards, 2:34.**
- NYG – Younghoe Koo 32-yard field goal, 0:03. Giants 10–7. **Drive: 8 plays, 53 yards, 1:05.**

**Third quarter**

- NYG – Jaxson Dart 24-yard run (Younghoe Koo kick), 12:17. Giants 17–7. **Drive: 6 plays, 56 yards, 2:43.**
- CHI – Cairo Santos 22-yard field goal, 0:34. Giants 17–10. **Drive: 8 plays, 80 yards, 4:31.**

**Fourth quarter**

- NYG – Younghoe Koo 19-yard field goal, 10:19. Giants 20–10. **Drive: 10 plays, 79 yards, 5:15.**
- CHI – Rome Odunze 2-yard pass from Caleb Williams (Cairo Santos kick), 3:56. Giants 20–17. **Drive: 9 plays, 91 yards, 2:17.**
- CHI – Caleb Williams 17-yard run (Cairo Santos kick), 1:47. Bears 24–20. **Drive: 4 plays, 53 yards, 1:06.**

**Top passers**

- NYG – Jaxson Dart – 19/29, 242 yards
- CHI – Caleb Williams – 20/36, 220 yards, TD

**Top rushers**

- NYG – Tyrone Tracy Jr. – 14 rushes, 71 yards
- CHI – D'Andre Swift – 13 rushes, 80 yards

**Top receivers**

- NYG – Darius Slayton – 4 receptions, 89 yards
- CHI – Rome Odunze – 6 receptions, 86 yards, TD

Although the Giants held a 20–10 lead with 10:19 remaining, the Bears staged yet another comeback as Caleb Williams scored two touchdowns to secure the victory. With the win, the Bears improved to 6–3 for the first time since the 2018 season.

==== Week 11: at Minnesota Vikings ====
Week 11: Chicago Bears at Minnesota Vikings – Game summary

Quarter	1	2	3	4	Total
**Bears**	0	10	6	3	**19**
Vikings	3	0	0	14	**17**

at U.S. Bank Stadium, Minneapolis, Minnesota

- Date: November 16
- Game time: 12:00 p.m. CST
- Game weather: None (indoor stadium)
- Game attendance: 66,952
- Referee: Brad Rogers
- TV announcers (Fox): Kevin Burkhardt, Tom Brady, Erin Andrews and Tom Rinaldi
- Recap, Game Book

Game information

**First quarter**

- MIN – Will Reichard 31-yard field goal, 2:10. Vikings 3–0. **Drive: 8 plays, 47 yards, 4:13.**

**Second quarter**

- CHI – Kyle Monangai 1-yard run (Cairo Santos kick), 4:55. Bears 7–3. **Drive: 15 plays, 74 yards, 8:25.**
- CHI – Cairo Santos 38-yard field goal, 2:00. Bears 10–3. **Drive: 4 plays, 5 yards, 1:34.**

**Third quarter**

- CHI – Cairo Santos 54-yard field goal, 10:31. Bears 13–3. **Drive: 9 plays, 33 yards, 4:29.**
- CHI – Cairo Santos 33-yard field goal, 2:11. Bears 16–3. **Drive: 10 plays, 65 yards, 5:07.**

**Fourth quarter**

- MIN – Jordan Mason 16-yard run (Will Reichard kick), 12:33. Bears 16–10. **Drive: 2 plays, 24 yards, 0:41.**
- MIN – Jordan Addison 15-yard pass from J. J. McCarthy (Will Reichard kick), 0:50. Vikings 17–16. **Drive: 10 plays, 85 yards, 2:24.**
- CHI – Cairo Santos 48-yard field goal, 0:00. Bears 19–17. **Drive: 4 plays, 9 yards, 0:50.**

**Top passers**

- CHI – Caleb Williams – 16/32, 193 yards
- MIN – J. J. McCarthy – 16/32, 150 yards, TD, 2 INT

**Top rushers**

- CHI – D'Andre Swift – 21 rushes, 90 yards
- MIN – Aaron Jones – 16 rushes, 70 yards

**Top receivers**

- CHI – Cole Kmet – 5 receptions, 45 yards
- MIN – Justin Jefferson – 5 receptions, 61 yards

Although the Vikings overcame a 16–3 fourth-quarter deficit and took a one-point lead with 50 seconds remaining, a 56-yard kickoff return by Devin Duvernay set up Cairo Santos to convert a 48-yard game-winning field goal as time expired, completing another comeback victory for Chicago.

==== Week 12: vs. Pittsburgh Steelers ====
Week 12: Pittsburgh Steelers at Chicago Bears – Game summary

Quarter	1	2	3	4	Total
Steelers	7	14	0	7	**28**
**Bears**	7	10	7	7	**31**

at Soldier Field, Chicago, Illinois

- Date: November 23
- Game time: 12:00 p.m. CST
- Game weather: Sunny, 51 °F (11 °C)
- Game attendance: 59,658
- Referee: John Hussey
- TV announcers (CBS): Ian Eagle, J. J. Watt and Evan Washburn
- Recap, Game Book

Game information

**First quarter**

- CHI – D. J. Moore 5-yard pass from Caleb Williams (Cairo Santos kick), 8:28. Bears 7–0. **Drive: 8 plays, 56 yards, 4:07.**
- PIT – DK Metcalf 6-yard run (Chris Boswell kick), 0:30. Tied 7–7. **Drive: 13 plays, 95 yards, 7:58.**

**Second quarter**

- PIT – Nick Herbig 0-yard fumble recovery (Chris Boswell kick), 14:44. Steelers 14–7.
- CHI – Colston Loveland 12-yard pass from Caleb Williams (Cairo Santos kick), 3:56. Tied 14–14. **Drive: 11 plays, 70 yards, 4:50.**
- PIT – Jaylen Warren 1-yard run (Chris Boswell kick), 1:19. Steelers 21–14. **Drive: 7 plays, 80 yards, 2:37.**
- CHI – Cairo Santos 47-yard field goal, 0:00. Steelers 21–17. **Drive: 9 plays, 35 yards, 1:19.**

**Third quarter**

- CHI – D. J. Moore 25-yard pass from Caleb Williams (Cairo Santos kick), 8:29. Bears 24–21. **Drive: 5 plays, 60 yards, 2:47.**

**Fourth quarter**

- CHI – Kyle Monangai 2-yard run (Cairo Santos kick), 14:14. Bears 31–21. **Drive: 9 plays, 54 yards, 4:38.**
- PIT – Pat Freiermuth 3-yard pass from Mason Rudolph (Chris Boswell kick), 6:27. Bears 31–28. **Drive: 17 plays, 73 yards, 7:47.**

**Top passers**

- PIT – Mason Rudolph – 24/31, 171 yards, TD, INT
- CHI – Caleb Williams – 19/35, 239 yards, 3 TD

**Top rushers**

- PIT – Kenneth Gainwell – 10 rushes, 92 yards
- CHI – Kyle Monangai – 12 rushes, 48 yards, TD

**Top receivers**

- PIT – Calvin Austin III – 4 receptions, 36 yards
- CHI – D. J. Moore – 5 receptions, 64 yards, 2 TD

Although the Bears’ former rival quarterback from the Packers, Aaron Rodgers, now plays for the Steelers, the Bears didn’t face him because he was sidelined with a broken left wrist. With their 4th home win against Pittsburgh since 2001, the Bears improved to 8–3 and 2–1 against the AFC North.

==== Week 13: at Philadelphia Eagles ====
Black Friday games

Week 13: Chicago Bears at Philadelphia Eagles – Game summary

Quarter	1	2	3	4	Total
**Bears**	7	3	0	14	**24**
Eagles	0	3	6	6	**15**

at Lincoln Financial Field, Philadelphia, Pennsylvania

- Date: November 28
- Game time: 3:00 p.m. EST/2:00 p.m. CST
- Game weather: Sunny, 42 °F (6 °C)
- Game attendance: 69,879
- Referee: Carl Cheffers
- TV announcers (WFLD/Prime Video): Al Michaels, Kirk Herbstreit and Kaylee Hartung
- Recap, Game Book

Game information

**First quarter**

- CHI – D'Andre Swift 3-yard run (Cairo Santos kick), 1:31. Bears 7–0. **Drive: 11 plays, 78 yards, 5:26.**

**Second quarter**

- PHI – Jake Elliott 44-yard field goal, 13:04. Bears 7–3. **Drive: 7 plays, 39 yards, 3:27.**
- CHI – Cairo Santos 30-yard field goal, 6:44. Bears 10–3. **Drive: 15 plays, 68 yards, 6:20.**

**Third quarter**

- PHI – A. J. Brown 33-yard pass from Jalen Hurts (kick blocked), 8:05. Bears 10–9. **Drive: 5 plays, 92 yards, 1:54.**

**Fourth quarter**

- CHI – Kyle Monangai 4-yard run (Cairo Santos kick), 12:49. Bears 17–9. **Drive: 12 plays, 87 yards, 6:44.**
- CHI – Cole Kmet 28-yard pass from Caleb Williams (Cairo Santos kick), 6:19. Bears 24–9. **Drive: 8 plays, 63 yards, 4:56.**
- PHI – A. J. Brown 4-yard pass from Jalen Hurts (pass failed), 3:10. Bears 24–15. **Drive: 12 plays, 80 yards, 3:09.**

**Top passers**

- CHI – Caleb Williams – 17/36, 154 yards, TD, INT
- PHI – Jalen Hurts – 19/34, 230 yards, 2 TD, INT

**Top rushers**

- CHI – Kyle Monangai – 22 rushes, 130 yards, TD
- PHI – Saquon Barkley – 13 rushes, 56 yards

**Top receivers**

- CHI – Cole Kmet – 3 receptions, 36 yards, TD
- PHI – A. J. Brown – 10 receptions, 132 yards, 2 TD

Running backs D'Andre Swift and rookie Kyle Monangai rushed for a combined 255 yards and 2 touchdowns with Swift rushing for 125 and Monangai rushing for 130. It was the first time the Bears had two 100-yard rushers since Walter Payton and Matt Suhey in 1985. With their first win over Philadelphia since 2011, the Bears snapped a six-game losing streak against the Eagles and swept the NFC East. This also marked their first winning season since 2018.

==== Week 14: at Green Bay Packers ====
Week 14: Chicago Bears at Green Bay Packers – Game summary

Quarter	1	2	3	4	Total
Bears	0	3	11	7	**21**
**Packers**	0	14	7	7	**28**

at Lambeau Field, Green Bay, Wisconsin

- Date: December 7
- Game time: 3:25 p.m. CST
- Game weather: Sunny, 16 °F (−9 °C)
- Game attendance: 78,214
- Referee: Craig Wrolstad
- TV announcers (Fox): Kevin Burkhardt, Tom Brady, Erin Andrews and Tom Rinaldi
- Recap, Game Book

Game information

**First quarter**

- No scoring plays

**Second quarter**

- GB – Christian Watson 23-yard pass from Jordan Love (Brandon McManus kick), 9:19. Packers 7–0. **Drive: 11 plays, 80 yards, 5:50.**
- CHI – Cairo Santos 33-yard field goal, 1:14. Packers 7–3. **Drive: 14 plays, 59 yards, 8:05.**
- GB – Bo Melton 45-yard pass from Jordan Love (Brandon McManus kick), 0:38. Packers 14–3. **Drive: 4 plays, 60 yards, 0:36.**

**Third quarter**

- CHI – Olamide Zaccheaus 1-yard pass from Caleb Williams (Kyle Monangai run), 8:20. Packers 14–11. **Drive: 10 plays, 64 yards, 5:36.**
- GB – Christian Watson 41-yard pass from Jordan Love (Brandon McManus kick), 6:10. Packers 21–11. **Drive: 4 plays, 63 yards, 2:10.**
- CHI – Cairo Santos 41-yard field goal, 3:15. Packers 21–14. **Drive: 7 plays, 37 yards, 2:55.**

**Fourth quarter**

- CHI – Colston Loveland 1-yard pass from Caleb Williams (Cairo Santos kick), 8:00. Tied 21–21. **Drive: 17 plays, 83 yards, 8:32.**
- GB – Josh Jacobs 2-yard run (Brandon McManus kick), 3:32. Packers 28–21. **Drive: 8 plays, 65 yards, 4:28.**

**Top passers**

- CHI – Caleb Williams – 19/35, 186 yards, 2 TD, INT
- GB – Jordan Love – 17/25, 234 yards, 3 TD, INT

**Top rushers**

- CHI – D'Andre Swift – 13 rushes, 63 yards
- GB – Josh Jacobs – 20 rushes, 86 yards, TD

**Top receivers**

- CHI – Luther Burden III – 4 receptions, 67 yards
- GB – Christian Watson – 4 receptions, 89 yards, 2 TD

In a game-deciding play, Packers cornerback Keisean Nixon intercepted Caleb Williams’ pass in the end zone with 22 seconds remaining, leading to a Packers victory.

==== Week 15: vs. Cleveland Browns ====
Week 15: Cleveland Browns at Chicago Bears – Game summary

Quarter	1	2	3	4	Total
Browns	0	0	3	0	**3**
**Bears**	14	0	14	3	**31**

at Soldier Field, Chicago, Illinois

- Date: December 14
- Game time: 12:00 p.m. CST
- Game weather: Sunny, 8 °F (−13 °C)
- Game attendance: 54,051
- Referee: Ron Torbert
- TV announcers (Fox): Kevin Kugler, Daryl Johnston and Allison Williams
- Recap, Game Book

Game information

**First quarter**

- CHI – D'Andre Swift 6-yard run (Cairo Santos kick), 7:35. Bears 7–0. **Drive: 6 plays, 42 yards, 3:43.**
- CHI – D. J. Moore 3-yard pass from Caleb Williams (Cairo Santos kick), 1:29. Bears 14–0. **Drive: 7 plays, 80 yards, 4:25.**

**Second quarter**

- No scoring plays

**Third quarter**

- CLE – Andre Szmyt 50-yard field goal, 10:03. Bears 14–3. **Drive: 6 plays, 16 yards, 2:10.**
- CHI – D. J. Moore 22-yard pass from Caleb Williams (Cairo Santos kick), 8:39. Bears 21–3. **Drive: 1 play, 22 yards, 0:07.**
- CHI – D'Andre Swift 17-yard run (Cairo Santos kick), 0:46. Bears 28–3. **Drive: 9 plays, 80 yards, 5:01.**

**Fourth quarter**

- CHI – Cairo Santos 41-yard field goal, 7:30. Bears 31–3. **Drive: 4 plays, -1 yard, 1:25.**

**Top passers**

- CLE – Shedeur Sanders – 18/35, 177 yards, 3 INT
- CHI – Caleb Williams – 17/28, 242 yards, 2 TD

**Top rushers**

- CLE – Shedeur Sanders – 2 rushes, 24 yards
- CHI – D'Andre Swift – 18 rushes, 98 yards, 2 TD

**Top receivers**

- CLE – Isaiah Bond – 2 receptions, 89 yards
- CHI – Luther Burden III – 6 receptions, 84 yards

With the win, the Bears clinched their first double-digit win season since 2018.

==== Week 16: vs. Green Bay Packers ====
Week 16: Green Bay Packers at Chicago Bears – Game summary

Quarter	1	2	3	4	OT	Total
Packers	0	6	7	3	0	**16**
**Bears**	0	0	3	13	6	**22**

at Soldier Field, Chicago, Illinois

- Date: December 20
- Game time: 7:20 p.m. CST
- Game weather: Clear, 37 °F (3 °C)
- Game attendance: 60,152
- Referee: Alex Kemp
- TV announcers (Fox): Kevin Burkhardt, Tom Brady, Erin Andrews and Tom Rinaldi
- Recap, Game Book

Game information

**First quarter**

- No scoring plays

**Second quarter**

- GB – Brandon McManus 26-yard field goal, 12:45. Packers 3–0. **Drive: 14 plays, 70 yards, 6:06.**
- GB – Brandon McManus 22-yard field goal, 1:41. Packers 6–0. **Drive: 16 plays, 91 yards, 7:53.**

**Third quarter**

- CHI – Cairo Santos 46-yard field goal, 12:12. Packers 6–3. **Drive: 6 plays, 38 yards, 2:48.**
- GB – Romeo Doubs 33-yard pass from Malik Willis (Brandon McManus kick), 0:33. Packers 13–3. **Drive: 6 plays, 64 yards, 3:42.**

**Fourth quarter**

- CHI – Cairo Santos 51-yard field goal, 10:52. Packers 13–6. **Drive: 10 plays, 47 yards, 4:41.**
- GB – Brandon McManus 28-yard field goal, 5:03. Packers 16–6. **Drive: 10 plays, 53 yards, 5:49.**
- CHI – Cairo Santos 43-yard field goal, 1:59. Packers 16–9. **Drive: 11 plays, 43 yards, 3:04.**
- CHI – Jahdae Walker 6-yard pass from Caleb Williams (Cairo Santos kick), 0:24. Tied 16–16. **Drive: 8 plays, 53 yards, 1:35.**

**Overtime**

- CHI – D. J. Moore 46-yard pass from Caleb Williams, 4:50. Bears 22–16. **Drive: 4 plays, 64 yards, 1:20.**

**Top passers**

- GB – Malik Willis – 9/11, 121 yards, TD
- CHI – Caleb Williams – 19/34, 250 yards, 2 TD

**Top rushers**

- GB – Emanuel Wilson – 14 rushes, 82 yards
- CHI – D'Andre Swift – 13 rushes, 58 yards

**Top receivers**

- GB – Romeo Doubs – 5 receptions, 84 yards, TD
- CHI – D. J. Moore – 5 receptions, 97 yards, TD

The Packers lost quarterback Jordan Love to a concussion after he took a helmet-to-helmet hit from Chicago’s Austin Booker in the second quarter. In a defensive battle, Green Bay built a 16–6 lead when kicker Brandon McManus kicked a 28-yard field goal with about five minutes remaining. The Bears responded by marching down the field and kicking a field goal just as the two-minute warning arrived. Chicago then recovered an onside kick, setting up a dramatic finish. Facing 4th-and-4 at the Packers' 6-yard line, Caleb Williams beat an all-out blitz and lofted a pass to a wide-open Jahdae Walker in the right corner of the end zone to force overtime. In overtime, the Packers had 4th-and-1 at the Chicago 36, but backup quarterback Malik Willis fumbled the snap. On the ensuing Bears drive, Williams connected with D. J. Moore for a 46-yard touchdown, completing a comeback victory.

The Bears defeated the Packers at home for the first time since 2018. With the Steelers defeating the Lions the following day, the Bears clinched their first playoff berth since the 2020 season. Next Gen Stats reported the Bears' rally against the Packers was the fifth-most improbable comeback since 2016, while Pro Football Focus graded Williams' game-winning touchdown throw as the highest-rated passing play of the season.

==== Week 17: at San Francisco 49ers ====
Week 17: Chicago Bears at San Francisco 49ers – Game summary

Quarter	1	2	3	4	Total
Bears	14	7	7	10	**38**
**49ers**	14	14	7	7	**42**

at Levi's Stadium, Santa Clara, California

- Date: December 28
- Game time: 7:20 p.m. CST/5:20 p.m. PST
- Game weather: Sunny, 53 °F (12 °C)
- Game attendance: 71,836
- Referee: Alex Moore
- TV announcers (NBC): Mike Tirico, Cris Collinsworth and Melissa Stark
- Recap, Game Book

Game information

**First quarter**

- CHI – T. J. Edwards 34-yard interception return (Cairo Santos kick), 14:45. Bears 7–0.
- SF – Jake Tonges 1-yard pass from Brock Purdy (Eddy Pineiro kick), 10:57. Tied 7–7. **Drive: 9 plays, 65 yards, 3:48.**
- SF – Brock Purdy 10-yard run (Eddy Pineiro kick), 4:52. 49ers 14–7. **Drive: 3 plays, 66 yards, 1:21.**
- CHI – Luther Burden III 35-yard pass from Caleb Williams (Cairo Santos kick), 2:58. Tied 14–14. **Drive: 5 plays, 77 yards, 1:54.**

**Second quarter**

- SF – Christian McCaffrey 5-yard run (Eddy Pineiro kick), 13:44. 49ers 21–14. **Drive: 9 plays, 75 yards, 4:14.**
- CHI – Colston Loveland 36-yard pass from Caleb Williams (Cairo Santos kick), 12:20. Tied 21–21. **Drive: 3 plays, 65 yards, 1:24.**
- SF – Brock Purdy 3-yard run (Eddy Pineiro kick), 3:23. 49ers 28–21. **Drive: 15 plays, 72 yards, 8:57.**

**Third quarter**

- CHI – D'Andre Swift 2-yard run (Cairo Santos kick), 9:51. Tied 28–28. **Drive: 10 plays, 65 yards, 5:09.**
- SF – Kyle Juszczyk 6-yard pass from Brock Purdy (Eddy Pineiro kick), 4:52. 49ers 35–28. **Drive: 8 plays, 65 yards, 4:59.**

**Fourth quarter**

- CHI – D'Andre Swift 22-yard run (Cairo Santos kick), 14:54. Tied 35–35. **Drive: 10 plays, 80 yards, 4:58.**
- CHI – Cairo Santos 29-yard field goal, 5:22. Bears 38–35. **Drive: 11 plays, 78 yards, 6:01.**
- SF – Jauan Jennings 38-yard pass from Brock Purdy (Eddy Pineiro kick), 2:15. 49ers 42–38. **Drive: 7 plays, 75 yards, 3:07.**

**Top passers**

- CHI – Caleb Williams – 25/42, 330 yards, 2 TD
- SF – Brock Purdy – 24/33, 303 yards, 3 TD, INT

**Top rushers**

- CHI – D'Andre Swift – 9 rushes, 54 yards, 2 TD
- SF – Christian McCaffrey – 23 rushes, 140 yards, TD

**Top receivers**

- CHI – Luther Burden III – 8 receptions, 138 yards, TD
- SF – Ricky Pearsall – 5 receptions, 85 yards

Following the Packers' loss to the Ravens from yesterday, the Bears clinched their first NFC North title since 2018.

The Bears and 49ers engaged in a shootout, with the game decided on the final play when Caleb Williams’ last-ditch pass to Jahdae Walker fell incomplete in the end zone from San Francisco’s 2-yard line, sealing the 49ers’ victory. With the loss, the Bears dropped to 11–5 finished 5–4 on the road.

==== Week 18: vs. Detroit Lions ====
Week 18: Detroit Lions at Chicago Bears – Game summary

Quarter	1	2	3	4	Total
**Lions**	3	10	3	3	**19**
Bears	0	0	0	16	**16**

at Soldier Field, Chicago, Illinois

- Date: January 4
- Game time: 3:25 p.m. CST
- Game weather: Mostly cloudy, 33 °F (1 °C)
- Game attendance: 57,036
- Referee: Brad Rogers
- TV announcers (Fox): Kevin Burkhardt, Tom Brady, Erin Andrews and Tom Rinaldi
- Recap, Game Book

Game information

**First quarter**

- DET – Jake Bates 34-yard field goal, 8:35. Lions 3–0. **Drive: 11 plays, 55 yards, 6:25.**

**Second quarter**

- DET – Jake Bates 30-yard field goal, 11:28. Lions 6–0. **Drive: 16 plays, 66 yards, 7:11.**
- DET – Jahmyr Gibbs 15-yard pass from Jared Goff (Jake Bates kick), 4:40. Lions 13–0. **Drive: 9 plays, 76 yards, 5:06.**

**Third quarter**

- DET – Jake Bates 25-yard field goal, 2:11. Lions 16–0. **Drive: 11 plays, 74 yards, 5:34.**

**Fourth quarter**

- CHI – Jahdae Walker 25-yard pass from Caleb Williams (Kyle Monangai run), 14:16. Lions 16–8. **Drive: 7 plays, 65 yards, 2:55.**
- CHI – Colston Loveland 1-yard pass from Caleb Williams (Caleb Williams–Cole Kmet pass), 5:25. Tied 16–16. **Drive: 12 plays, 88 yards, 5:56.**
- DET – Jake Bates 42-yard field goal, 0:00. Lions 19–16. **Drive: 6 plays, 39 yards, 1:41.**

**Top passers**

- DET – Jared Goff – 27/42, 331 yards, TD, INT
- CHI – Caleb Williams – 20/33, 212 yards, 2 TD, INT

**Top rushers**

- DET – Jahmyr Gibbs – 19 rushes, 80 yards
- CHI – D'Andre Swift – 10 rushes, 40 yards

**Top receivers**

- DET – Amon-Ra St. Brown – 11 receptions, 139 yards
- CHI – Colston Loveland – 10 receptions, 91 yards, TD

Caleb Williams threw for 212 yards, giving him 3,942 on the season and surpassing Erik Kramer’s franchise record of 3,838 set in 1995. Chicago remains the only NFL team without a 4,000-yard passer. Kevin Byard recorded his league-leading seventh interception.

Despite the loss, the Eagles loss to the Commanders allowed the Bears to remain the NFC’s second seed, setting up a Wild Card Round matchup against their division rival Green Bay Packers.

=== Standings ===
==== Division ====
NFC North
	W	L	T	PCT	DIV	CONF	PF	PA	STK
^{(2)} Chicago Bears	11	6	0	.647	2–4	7–5	441	415	L2
^{(7)} Green Bay Packers	9	7	1	.559	4–2	7–4–1	391	360	L4
Minnesota Vikings	9	8	0	.529	4–2	7–5	344	333	W5
Detroit Lions	9	8	0	.529	2–4	6–6	481	413	W1

==== Conference ====
NFC
Seed	Team	Division	W	L	T	PCT	DIV	CONF	SOS	SOV	STK
**Division leaders**
1	Seattle Seahawks	West	14	3	0	.824	4–2	9–3	.498	.471	W7
2 (Note: Chicago finished ahead of Philadelphia based on head-to-head victory.)	Chicago Bears	North	11	6	0	.647	2–4	7–5	.458	.406	L2
3	Philadelphia Eagles	East	11	6	0	.647	3–3	8–4	.476	.455	L1
4 (Note: Carolina finished ahead of Tampa Bay and Atlanta based on head-to-head record (Carolina 3–1 to Tampa Bay 2–2 and Atlanta 1–3).)	Carolina Panthers	South	8	9	0	.471	3–3	6–6	.522	.463	L2
**Wild cards**
5 (Note: LA Rams finished ahead of San Francisco based on common games (LA Rams 9–3 to San Francisco 8–4 against: Arizona, Atlanta, Carolina, Houston, Indianapolis, Jacksonville, New Orleans, Seattle, Tampa Bay and Tennessee).)	Los Angeles Rams	West	12	5	0	.706	4–2	7–5	.526	.485	W1
6	San Francisco 49ers	West	12	5	0	.706	4–2	9–3	.498	.417	L1
7	Green Bay Packers	North	9	7	1	.559	4–2	7–4–1	.483	.431	L4
**Did not qualify for the postseason**
8 (Note: Minnesota finished ahead of Detroit based on head-to-head sweep.)	Minnesota Vikings	North	9	8	0	.529	4–2	7–5	.514	.431	W5
9	Detroit Lions	North	9	8	0	.529	2–4	6–6	.490	.428	W1
10 (Note: Tampa Bay finished ahead of Atlanta based on common games (Tampa Bay 6–6 to Atlanta 5–7 against: Arizona, Buffalo, Carolina, LA Rams, Miami, New England, New Orleans, NY Jets, San Francisco and Seattle).)	Tampa Bay Buccaneers	South	8	9	0	.471	3–3	6–6	.529	.485	W1
11	Atlanta Falcons	South	8	9	0	.471	3–3	7–5	.495	.449	W4
12	Dallas Cowboys	East	7	9	1	.441	4–2	4–7–1	.438	.311	L1
13	New Orleans Saints	South	6	11	0	.353	3–3	4–8	.495	.333	L1
14	Washington Commanders	East	5	12	0	.294	3–3	3–9	.507	.388	W1
15	New York Giants	East	4	13	0	.235	2–4	2–10	.524	.478	W2
16	Arizona Cardinals	West	3	14	0	.176	0–6	3–9	.571	.422	L9
**Tiebreakers** (Note: When breaking ties for three or more teams under the NFL's rules, they are first broken within divisions, then comparing only the highest ranked remaining team from each division.)

== Postseason ==
=== Schedule ===
Round	Date	Opponent (seed)	Result	Record	Venue	Sources
Wild Card	January 10	Green Bay Packers (7)	W 31–27	1–0	Soldier Field	Recap
Divisional	January 18	Los Angeles Rams (5)	L 17–20 (OT)	1–1	Soldier Field	Recap

=== Game summaries ===
==== NFC Wild Card Playoffs: vs. (7) Green Bay Packers ====
NFC Wild Card Playoffs: (7) Green Bay Packers at (2) Chicago Bears – Game summary

Quarter	1	2	3	4	Total
Packers	7	14	0	6	27
Bears	3	0	3	25	31

at Soldier Field, Chicago, Illinois

- Date: January 10, 2026
- Game time: 7:15 p.m. CST
- Game weather: Mostly cloudy, 32 °F (0 °C)
- Game attendance: 60,338
- Referee: Adrian Hill
- TV announcers (WFLD/Prime Video): Al Michaels, Kirk Herbstreit, and Kaylee Hartung
- Recap, Game Book

Game information

First quarter

- CHI – Cairo Santos 27-yard field goal, 7:02. Bears 3–0. Drive: 16 plays, 59 yards, 7:58.
- GB – Christian Watson 7-yard pass from Jordan Love (Brandon McManus kick), 2:06. Packers 7–3. Drive: 9 plays, 85 yards, 4:56.

Second quarter

- GB – Jayden Reed 18-yard pass from Jordan Love (Brandon McManus kick), 6:46. Packers 14–3. Drive: 10 plays, 87 yards, 5:37.
- GB – Romeo Doubs 1-yard pass from Jordan Love (Brandon McManus kick), 1:56. Packers 21–3. Drive: 8 plays, 32 yards, 3:19.

Third quarter

- CHI – Cairo Santos 34-yard field goal, 10:07. Packers 21–6. Drive: 8 plays, 48 yards, 3:46.

Fourth quarter

- CHI – Cairo Santos 51-yard field goal, 13:29. Packers 21–9. Drive: 7 plays, 2 yards, 2:06.
- CHI – D'Andre Swift 5-yard run (Cairo Santos kick), 10:08. Packers 21–16. Drive: 7 plays, 66 yards, 2:30.
- GB – Matthew Golden 23-yard pass from Jordan Love (kick failed), 6:36. Packers 27–16. Drive: 7 plays, 46 yards, 1:34.
- CHI – Olamide Zaccheaus 8-yard pass from Caleb Williams (Caleb Williams–Colston Loveland), 4:18. Packers 27–24. Drive: 10 plays, 76 yards, 2:18.
- CHI – D. J. Moore 25-yard pass from Caleb Williams (Cairo Santos kick), 1:43. Bears 31–27. Drive: 6 plays, 66 yards, 1:08.

Top passers

- GB – Jordan Love – 24/46, 323 yards, 4 TD
- CHI – Caleb Williams – 24/48, 361 yards, 2 TD, 2 INT

Top rushers

- GB – Josh Jacobs – 19 rushes, 55 yards
- CHI – D'Andre Swift – 13 rushes, 54 yards, TD

Top receivers

- GB – Romeo Doubs – 8 receptions, 124 yards, TD
- CHI – Colston Loveland – 8 receptions, 137 yards

The Bears were down 21–3 coming out of halftime but produced another seemingly insurmountable comeback by scoring 25 points in the 4th quarter, coupled with several missed kicks from the Packers, to win 31–27. This was their first playoff win since 2010 (first over Green Bay since 1941) and the Bears advanced to the Divisional Round via a wild card victory for the first time since 1994. It was also Chicago's largest playoff comeback since 1933.

==== NFC Divisional Playoffs: vs. (5) Los Angeles Rams ====
NFC Divisional Playoffs: (5) Los Angeles Rams at (2) Chicago Bears – Game summary

Quarter	1	2	3	4	OT	Total
Rams	7	3	0	7	3	20
Bears	0	10	0	7	0	17

at Soldier Field, Chicago, Illinois

- Date: January 18, 2026
- Game time: 5:40 p.m. CST
- Game weather: Snow, 19 °F (−7 °C)
- Game attendance: 60,253
- Referee: Shawn Hochuli
- TV announcers (NBC): Mike Tirico, Cris Collinsworth, Melissa Stark and Kaylee Hartung
- Recap, Game Book

Game information

First quarter

- LAR – Kyren Williams 4-yard run (Harrison Mevis kick), 6:20. Rams 7–0. Drive: 14 plays, 85 yards, 6:33.

Second quarter

- CHI – D. J. Moore 3-yard pass from Caleb Williams (Cairo Santos kick), 14:55. Tied 7–7. Drive: 12 plays, 80 yards, 6:25.
- CHI – Cairo Santos 48-yard field goal, 1:10. Bears 10–7. Drive: 5 plays, 33 yards, 1:44.
- LAR – Harrison Mevis 32-yard field goal, 0:00. Tied 10–10. Drive: 8 plays, 66 yards, 1:10.

Third quarter

- No scoring plays

Fourth quarter

- LAR – Kyren Williams 5-yard run (Harrison Mevis kick), 8:50. Rams 17–10. Drive: 14 plays, 91 yards, 6:02.
- CHI – Cole Kmet 14-yard pass from Caleb Williams (Cairo Santos kick), 0:18. Tied 17–17. Drive: 7 plays, 50 yards, 1:32.

Overtime

- LAR – Harrison Mevis 42-yard field goal, 3:19. Rams 20–17. Drive: 10 plays, 54 yards, 3:20.

Top passers

- LAR – Matthew Stafford – 20/42, 258 yards
- CHI – Caleb Williams – 23/42, 257 yards, 2 TD, 3 INT

Top rushers

- LAR – Kyren Williams – 21 rushes, 87 yards, 2 TD
- CHI – D'Andre Swift – 19 rushes, 76 yards

Top receivers

- LAR – Colby Parkinson – 3 receptions, 56 yards
- CHI – Colston Loveland – 4 receptions, 56 yards

With their playoff loss to the Rams, the Bears season ended with their first Divisional Round loss since 2005. It was also their first home loss to the Rams since 2003.
