= Caleb Williams =

American football player (born 2001)

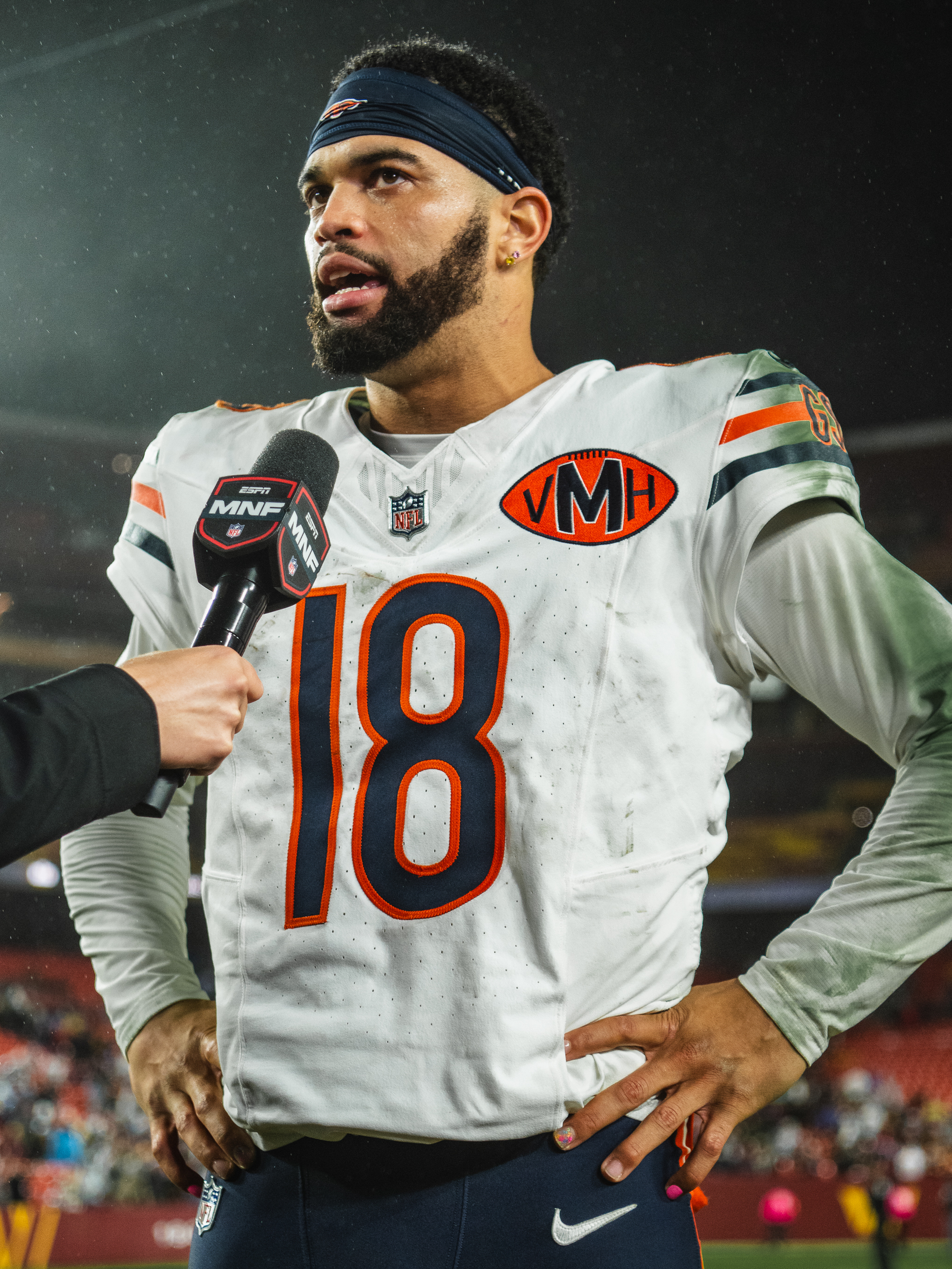
- Williams with the Chicago Bears in 2025

No. 18 – Chicago Bears
- Position: Quarterback
- Roster status: Active

Personal information
- Born: November 18, 2001 (age 25); Washington, D.C., U.S.
- Listed height: 6 ft 1 in (1.85 m)
- Listed weight: 226 lb (103 kg)

Career information
- High school: Gonzaga College (Washington, D.C.)
- College: Oklahoma (2021); USC (2022–2023)
- NFL draft: 2024: 1st round, 1st overall pick

Career history
- Chicago Bears (2024–present)

Awards and highlights
- Heisman Trophy (2022); Unanimous All-American (2022); NCAA passing touchdowns leader (2022); Pac-12 Offensive Player of the Year (2022); First-team All-Pac-12 (2022); Second-team All-Big 12 (2021); USC Trojans No. 13 retired; NFL records: Most consecutive passing attempts without an interception by a rookie: 354 (2024)

Career NFL statistics as of Week 9, 2026
- Passing attempts: 1,325
- Passing completions: 815
- Completion percentage: 61.5%
- TD–INT: 55–18
- Passing yards: 9,029
- Passer rating: 89.9
- Rushing yards: 1,022
- Rushing touchdowns: 5
- Stats at Pro Football Reference

Caleb Williams (born November 18, 2001) is an American professional football quarterback for the Chicago Bears of the National Football League (NFL). Following one season of college football with the Oklahoma Sooners, he played for the USC Trojans, winning the Heisman Trophy in 2022 and setting single season school records in passing yards and touchdowns.

Williams was selected first overall by the Bears in the 2024 NFL draft and set several franchise rookie passing records. In 2025, he led Chicago to their first division title since 2018 and first playoff win since 2010.

== Early life ==
Williams was born on November 18, 2001, in Washington, D.C., later attending Gonzaga College High School, where he played high school football. Williams is of Black and Native American descent. He is a member of the Piscataway-Conoy Tribe of Maryland. As a sophomore in 2018, Williams led Gonzaga to a WCAC Championship on a game winning Hail Mary pass as time expired. He was named Washington Post's All-Metropolitan 1st team and Washington, D.C. Gatorade Football Player of the Year after he passed for 2,624 passing yards with 26 touchdowns and rushed for 394 yards and 10 touchdowns. As a junior in 2019, Williams was named Washington Post's All-Metropolitan first team for the second consecutive year after throwing for 1,770 yards with 19 touchdowns and rushed for 838 yards with 18 touchdowns. He was named the Elite 11 finals MVP the following summer. In 2020, Williams's senior season was cancelled due to COVID-19. The highest-rated quarterback prospect of his class, Williams committed to play college football at the University of Oklahoma.

== College career ==
=== Oklahoma ===
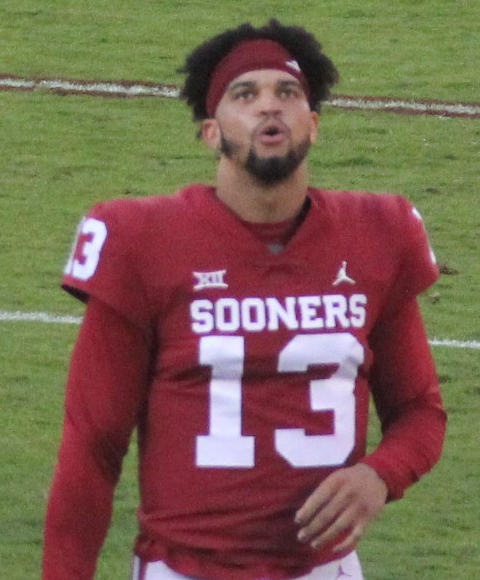
Williams in 2021

Williams entered his true freshman season with the Oklahoma Sooners in 2021 as the backup to Spencer Rattler, before assuming the role as starting quarterback midway through the Sooners' rivalry game with the Texas Longhorns in the team's sixth game of the season. In that game, Oklahoma was down 35–17 before Williams replaced Rattler and led the Sooners to a 55–48 victory. He finished with 212 passing yards, two passing touchdowns, 88 yards rushing, and a rushing touchdown. Williams made his first start the following week, against Texas Christian University, and threw for 295 yards, four touchdowns, and rushed for 66 yards and a rushing touchdown as Oklahoma won 52–31. Williams finished his freshman year with 1,912 passing yards, 21 touchdowns, and four interceptions to go along with 79 carries for 442 yards and six touchdowns in seven games.

=== USC ===
==== 2022 season ====
On January 3, 2022, Williams entered the transfer portal, and on February 1, he announced that he had transferred to the University of Southern California to play for the Trojans. This reunited Williams with head coach Lincoln Riley, who had been the head coach for the Sooners before being hired away by the Trojans the previous November. Williams was named the starter on August 25, and team captain six days later. In his first start against Rice, Williams completed 19 of 22 passes for 249 yards and two touchdowns as USC won 66–14. In their final game of the season, the Trojans were defeated by the Tulane Green Wave in the 2023 Cotton Bowl Classic. The final score was 45–46. Williams became the AP College Football Player of the Year, USC's first winner since Reggie Bush in 2005, and was named the 2022 Heisman Trophy winner. Williams finished the season with 4,537 passing yards for an NCAA-leading 42 touchdowns and five interceptions to go along with 113 carries for 382 yards and 10 touchdowns.

==== 2023 season ====
Williams and the Trojans went 7–5 in 2023 during the regular season, throwing for 3,633 yards, 30 touchdowns, and five interceptions to go along with 142 rushing yards and 11 touchdowns. He declared for the 2024 NFL draft following the season, finishing his college career throwing for over 10,000 yards with 120 total touchdowns.

As is the school's tradition for Heisman winners, Williams's number 13 was retired by USC in 2024.

== Professional career ==
=== NFL draft ===
Pre-draft measurables
Height	Weight	Arm length	Hand span	Wingspan
6 ft 1 1/8 in (1.86 m)	214 lb (97 kg)	32 in (0.81 m)	9 3/4 in (0.25 m)	6 ft 3 7/8 in (1.93 m)
All values from the NFL Combine

Williams was widely projected to be one of the first players selected in the 2024 NFL draft and the top quarterback in the draft class. His improvisational abilities in college were touted by analysts as one of his biggest strengths, such as ESPN's draft analyst Mel Kiper Jr. describing Williams as a "fabulous playmaker", though skepticism was levied at his smaller size and tendency to play "hero ball" to find a better play rather than a safer option. NFL.com draft writer Lance Zierlein and Bleacher Report's Derrik Klassen compared Williams' profile to Kyler Murray, while Fox Sports' Bucky Brooks and CBSSports.com drew parallels to Russell Wilson and Steve McNair.

The Chicago Bears selected Williams first overall in the draft. Chicago had received the pick after trading the previous year's first overall selection to the Carolina Panthers, and also acquired receiver D. J. Moore and several other picks in said trade. He was one of six quarterbacks taken in the first round, tied with the 1983 draft for the most in NFL history. As his college number 13 was taken by Keenan Allen, Williams switched to his high school number 18 in the NFL; the announcement was made less than half an hour after his draft selection. Williams' draft night merchandise sales value broke a Fanatics record.

=== 2024 season ===
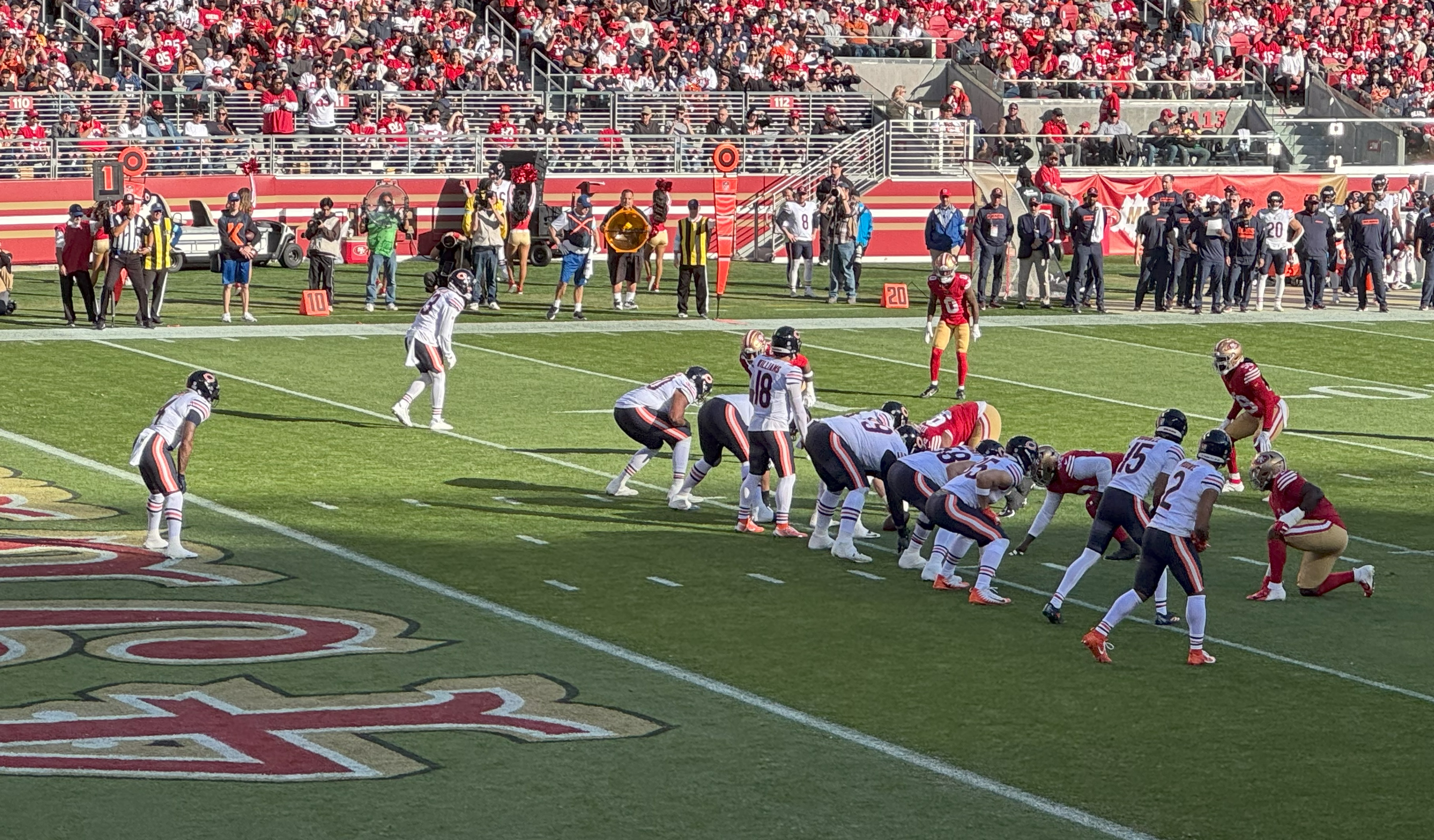
Williams and the Bears offense against the San Francisco 49ers, 2024

Williams was named the Bears' starter in May. On July 17, he signed his four-year rookie contract, worth $39.4 million fully guaranteed.

In Williams' NFL debut, the Bears fell behind the Tennessee Titans 17–0 before scoring 24 unanswered points. He completed 14 of 29 passes for 93 yards with no touchdowns or turnovers. Williams was the first quarterback to be drafted No. 1 overall and win his maiden start since David Carr in 2002, and the fifth since the AFL–NFL merger after Jim Plunkett (1971), John Elway (1983, did not finish his debut), and Michael Vick (2001).

The following week, Williams was intercepted twice and sacked seven times as the Bears lost 19–13 to the Houston Texans. Chicago also dropped the next game 21–16 to the Indianapolis Colts, during which he had his first two career touchdowns—a one-yard score to fellow first-round rookie Rome Odunze and a six-yard TD to Cole Kmet—and set the Bears' single-game rookie passing record with 363 yards. After a 1–2 start, Williams led victories over the Los Angeles Rams and Carolina Panthers, throwing for over 300 yards and two touchdowns against Carolina, becoming the first Bears rookie quarterback with multiple 300+ yard games. During Week 6 in London, Williams threw four touchdown passes in a 35–16 victory over the Jacksonville Jaguars, leading Chicago to their first three-game win streak since 2020 heading into the bye week. The London win earned him FedEx Air Player of Week honors.

During Week 8 against the Washington Commanders, Williams led a late go-ahead touchdown drive, but the Bears lost on a last-second Hail Mary pass, later dubbed the Hail Maryland. Chicago's struggles continued with back-to-back losses to the Arizona Cardinals and New England Patriots. The Bears offense failed to score a touchdown and Williams was sacked 15 times, marking the first time since 2004 that Chicago did not score a touchdown in consecutive games. Williams ended his four-game touchdown drought in a Week 12 30–27 overtime loss to the Minnesota Vikings, throwing for 340 yards, two touchdowns, and setting the Bears' rookie passing yards record. On Thanksgiving against the Detroit Lions on the road, Williams threw three touchdowns and set a rookie record for consecutive passes without an interception, but poor late-game clock management cost the Bears a chance at a comeback as they lost their sixth straight game, resulting in the firing of head coach Matt Eberflus the following day. Williams led a game-winning drive in the season finale to snap the Bears' ten-game losing streak and their 11-game skid to the Green Bay Packers, marking their first win against them since 2018; the victory also prevented Williams from tying Troy Aikman's record for the most consecutive games lost by a first-overall rookie quarterback.

Williams ended his rookie year with multiple Bears rookie passing records including completions, yards, and touchdown passes. He was also the first Bears quarterback to start every game in a season since Jay Cutler in 2009 despite being sacked a franchise-high 68 times, the third most in NFL history. Williams' streak of 354 passes without throwing an interception was the longest by a rookie and the fourth longest for all passers, a stretch that spanned a team- and NFL rookie-record nine games.

=== 2025 season ===
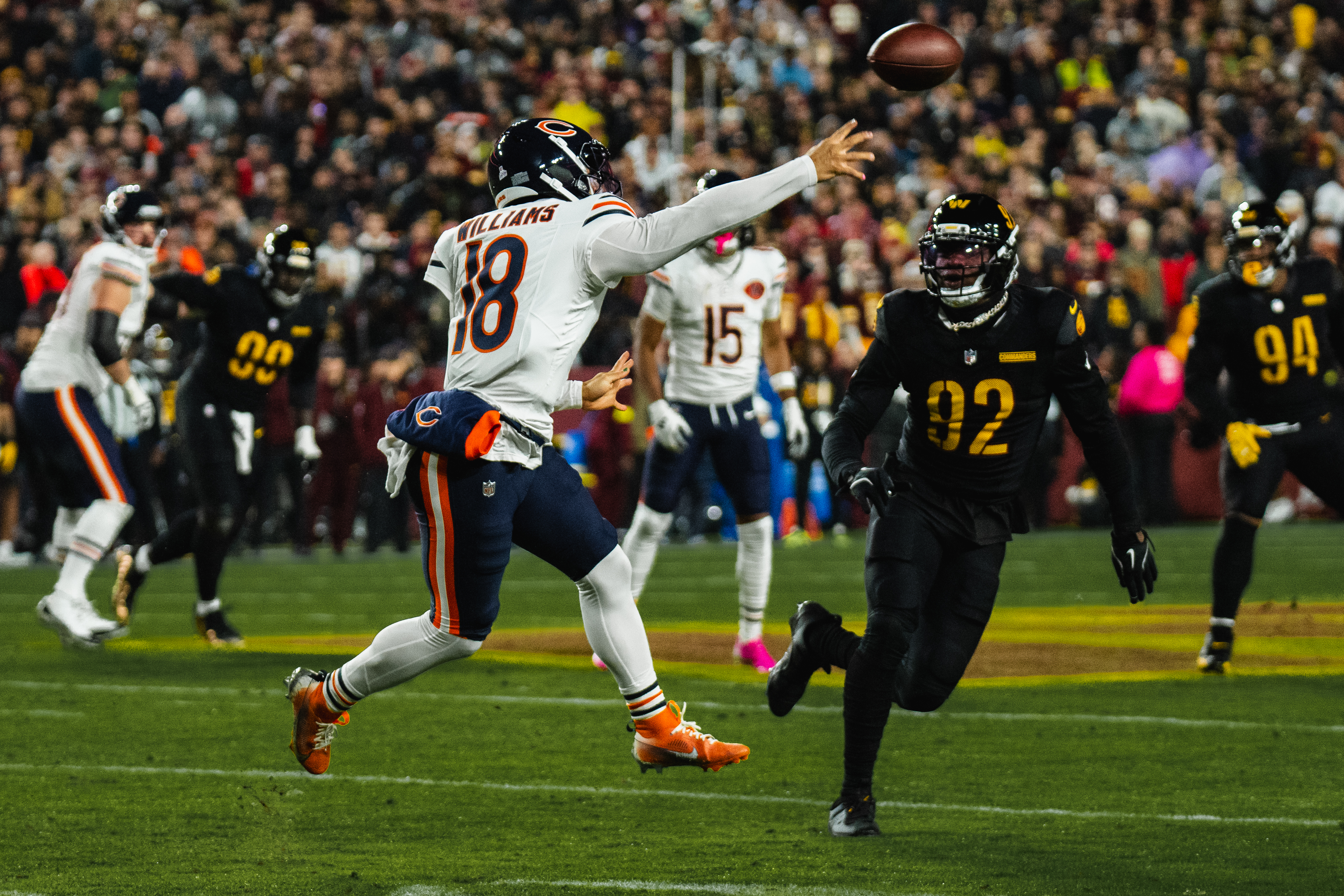
Williams throwing the ball against the Washington Commanders, 2025

On January 20, 2025, the Bears hired Ben Johnson as head coach. As the former offensive coordinator of the Lions, one of the major reasons for his hiring was to continue developing Williams as a quarterback.

Williams scored his first NFL rushing touchdown on the first drive of the season, though the Bears lost 27–24 to the Vikings. During a Week 3 31–14 victory over the Dallas Cowboys, whose defense was coached by Eberflus, Williams threw for 298 yards and four touchdowns, highlighted by a 65-yard flea flicker to Luther Burden III. Williams was named NFC Offensive Player of the Week for his performance.

In Week 9 against the Cincinnati Bengals, Williams threw for 280 yards and three touchdowns. He also caught two passes on trick plays from Moore for a two-yard score and backup quarterback Tyson Bagent, for which Williams became the first starting quarterback with multiple receptions in a game since George Taliaferro in 1953; Williams was the first Bears quarterback with a touchdown reception since Matt Barkley in 2016 and the first to do so in addition to multiple touchdown passes after Jim McMahon in 1985. With the Bears trailing by one point, he threw a game-winning 58-yard touchdown pass to Colston Loveland with 17 seconds remaining to secure the 47–42 road victory.

During the season, Williams developed a reputation for leading the Bears to fourth-quarter comeback victories. Prior to the Bengals, he helped defeat Washington with a 55-yard touchdown to D'Andre Swift and led the final drive to set up the winning field goal. In Week 10, the Bears were trailing the New York Giants by ten points when Williams had a 29-yard run to set up a touchdown before running 17 yards for the go-ahead score. Williams had a muted performance in the Week 11 rematch with Minnesota, but avoided turnovers and quarterbacked the last drive where the Bears made the game-deciding kick as time expired; he was credited with his franchise record fifth comeback win of the season. He received the nickname "Iceman" from Burden in reference to his undeterred disposition under pressure, which other Bears players and media also adopted. Williams called the moniker a "cool name" and found it intriguing because "ice is calm, but underneath is pure energy. [...] I feel at my calmest on the outside, but there's a lot going on in the inside."

The Bears and Packers split the two regular season meetings in their rivalry for 2025, both of which ended with critical plays involving Williams and Packers cornerback Keisean Nixon. In Week 14, the offense rallied from an anemic first half to trail by seven points with 3:37 remaining, reaching the Packers' 14-yard line when Williams' pass for Kmet was intercepted by Nixon. Two weeks later, Chicago erased a ten-point deficit before Williams tied the game on a fourth-down touchdown throw to Jahdae Walker. In overtime, he threw the game-winning 46-yard score to Moore with Nixon covering him. The Week 16 victory tied him with Peyton Manning for the most comeback wins by a player under the age of 25, while the winning touchdown to Moore was named the NFL Moment of the Year at the 15th NFL Honors.

The Bears' return to San Francisco in Week 17 saw what was described as a "duel" and a "true battle of gunslingers" between Williams and 49ers quarterback Brock Purdy. Both teams combined for 936 yards and ten touchdowns, with Williams throwing for 330 yards and two touchdowns. With the Bears trailing 42–38, Williams led the offense as far as the two-yard line. However, the 49ers defense sent pressure and his pass fell incomplete.

In the last game of the regular season between the Bears and Lions, Williams threw for 212 yards and helped the Bears rally from a 16–0 deficit. Although the Bears lost by three points, he broke the franchise single-season passing record with a total of 3,942. The previous record was 3,838 by Erik Kramer in 1995.

Williams made his postseason debut in the wild card round of the playoffs against the Packers. He struggled for the first three quarters as he threw two interceptions, including a third-quarter pick in the red zone, as Chicago trailed 21–6 entering the final quarter. The offense rebounded in the fourth via two touchdowns by Williams, including the go-ahead 25-yard score to Moore with 1:43 remaining. The 31–27 victory was the Bears' first playoff win since 2010 and made them the fourth team to win a playoff game after trailing by at least 15 points going into the fourth quarter.

In the divisional round against the Rams, Williams had two touchdown passes but also threw three interceptions; he was last picked off thrice at USC in 2023. The second touchdown, which came with 27 seconds remaining, was lauded for its improbable nature: on fourth down from the Rams' 14-yard line, Williams faced a blitz that forced him to scramble back to the 40 before throwing a basketball-style fadeaway pass to Kmet in the end zone. While it was officially a 14-yard touchdown, the ball traveled over 51 yards through the air. Although the score tied the game and forced overtime, he threw his third interception that set up the Rams' winning field goal.

=== 2026 season ===
Ahead of the 2026 season, Williams was named the cover athlete for Madden NFL 27. He is the first Bears player to appear on a Madden cover since Roberto Garza on the Spanish version of Madden NFL 09, and the third Bear for any football video game alongside Brian Urlacher for NFL 2K3.

Williams opened the regular season by leading the Bears to a 59–37 win over the Carolina Panthers, completing 21 of 29 passes for 269 yards and two touchdowns while also running for two scores. He subsequently received his second FedEx Air Player of the Week award. A week later, he and the offense struggled in rainy conditions against the Minnesota Vikings as he threw an interception and was sacked three times. In the fourth quarter, Williams suffered a non-contact hamstring injury (Note: The injury was reported by outlets as a Grade 2 hamstring strain. Williams refuted the reports and clarified he had torn his hamstring, but did not specify its extent.) while running that led to Bagent finishing out the 9–3 defeat. The injury prevented him from playing Weeks 3 through 5, the first time he missed a game in his NFL career. Bagent and Case Keenum filled in for Williams during this stretch.

After three weeks away, Williams made his return in Week 6 at the Atlanta Falcons. The lingering effects of the injury limited his scrambling and mobility, but he fared well within the passing pocket, overall completing 30 of 36 passes, including his first 12, for 305 yards with a touchdown to Loveland. His completion percentage was the highest by a Bears quarterback in a game with at least 30 attempts, and he completed all 24 of his passes within a clean pocket. Chicago won 31–23. With the TD pass to Loveland, Williams joined Patrick Mahomes and Lamar Jackson as the only quarterbacks in NFL history to reach 50 touchdown passes with less than 15 interceptions. He was named NFC Offensive Player of the Week. A 308-yard performance in the following game, a 30–24 win over the Patriots, made him the first Bears quarterback to record 300 passing yards in consecutive weeks since Mitchell Trubisky in 2018, and the first to do so without an interception since Brian Hoyer in 2016.

Victories over the Patriots and defending champion Seattle Seahawks meant the Bears defeated the previous year's Super Bowl teams in back-to-back weeks. The latter saw Williams become the first quarterback in 2026 to throw for 200 passing yards against the Seahawks' top-ranked "Dark Side" defense, recording 247 yards with a touchdown pass to Burden as the Bears won 34–17. It was also Williams' 36th regular season game in a row with at least 20 pass attempts and no more than one interception, surpassing Aaron Rodgers for the longest such streak in league history. The streak ended in Week 9 when Williams threw four interceptions after starting the game with two touchdown passes; although the Bears committed five turnovers, they beat the Tampa Bay Buccaneers 27–24. Williams was Chicago's first quarterback to be intercepted four times and still win since Todd Collins in 2010.

== Career statistics ==
Legend
	Led the league
**Bold**	Career high

=== NFL ===
==== Regular season ====
Year	Team	Games			Passing									Rushing					Sacks		Fumbles	
Year	Team	GP	GS	Record	Cmp	Att	Pct	Yds	Y/A	Lng	TD	Int	Rtg	Att	Yds	Avg	Lng	TD	Sck	SckY	Fum	Lost
2024	CHI	17	17	5–12	**351**	562	62.5	3,541	6.3	47	20	6	87.8	**81**	**489**	**6.0**	24	0	**68**	**466**	**10**	**5**
2025	CHI	17	17	**11–6**	330	**568**	58.1	**3,942**	**6.9**	**65**	**27**	**7**	**90.1**	77	388	5.0	**29**	**3**	24	165	9	1
2026	CHI	6	6	5–1	134	195	**68.7**	1,546	7.9	58	8	5	95.4	31	145	5.0	**29**	2	14	94	2	0
Career		40	40	21–19	815	1,325	61.5	9,025	6.8	65	55	18	89.9	184	1,022	5.5	29	5	106	725	20	6

==== Postseason ====
Year	Team	Games			Passing									Rushing					Sacks		Fumbles	
Year	Team	GP	GS	Record	Cmp	Att	Pct	Yds	Y/A	Lng	TD	Int	Rtg	Att	Yds	Avg	Lng	TD	Sck	SckY	Fum	Lost
2025	CHI	2	2	1–1	47	90	52.2	618	6.9	34	4	5	65.9	9	60	6.7	26	0	1	9	1	0
Career		2	2	1–1	47	90	52.2	618	6.9	34	4	5	65.9	9	60	6.7	26	0	1	9	1	0

=== College ===
Legend
Heisman Trophy
Led the NCAA

Season	Team	Games			Passing								Rushing			
Season	Team	GP	GS	Record	Cmp	Att	Pct	Yds	Avg	TD	Int	Rtg	Att	Yds	Avg	TD
2021	Oklahoma	11	7	5–2	136	211	64.5	1,912	9.1	21	4	169.6	79	**442**	**5.6**	6
2022	USC	14	14	**11–3**	**333**	**500**	66.6	**4,537**	9.1	**42**	**5**	168.5	**113**	382	3.4	10
2023	USC	12	12	7–5	266	388	**68.6**	3,633	**9.4**	30	**5**	**170.1**	97	142	1.5	**11**
Career		37	33	23–10	735	1,099	66.9	10,082	9.2	93	14	169.3	289	966	3.3	27

== Career highlights ==
=== Awards and honors ===
==== NFL ====
- NFL Moment of the Year (2025) (Note: Shared with D. J. Moore.)
- NFC Offensive Player of the Week: Week 3, 2025; Week 6, 2026
- FedEx Air & Ground Player of the Week: Week 6, 2024; Week 1, 2026
- Fantasy Performance of the Week: Week 1, 2026;
- NFL Top 100: 51st (2026)

==== College ====
- Heisman Trophy (2022)
- Maxwell Award (2022)
- Walter Camp Award (2022)
- AP College Football Player of the Year (2022)
- SN College Football Player of the Year (2022)
- Unanimous All-American (2022)
- NCAA passing touchdowns leader (2022)
- Pac-12 Offensive Player of the Year (2022)
- First-team All-Pac-12 (2022)
- Second-team All-Big 12 (2021)
- USC Trojans No. 13 retired

==== High school ====
- WCAC champion (2018)
- Washington, D.C. Gatorade Football Player of the Year (2018)
- 2× The Washington Post All‑Metropolitan First Team (2018, 2019)
- Elite 11 Finals MVP (2020)

=== Records ===
==== NFL records ====
- Fewest interceptions through 1,000 career passing attempts: 12
- Most consecutive passing attempts without an interception by a rookie: 354 (2024)
- First player with multiple passing touchdowns, multiple receptions, and a receiving touchdown in a single game (November 2, 2025, vs. Cincinnati Bengals)
- Most consecutive regular season games with at least 20 pass attempts and no more than one interception: 36

==== Bears franchise records ====
- Most passing attempts in a single season: 568 (2025)
- Most passing yards in a single season: 3,942 (2025)
- Most completions in a single season by a rookie: 351 (2024)
- Most passing attempts in a single season by a rookie: 562 (2024)
- Most passing yards in a single season by a rookie: 3,541 (2024)
- Most passing touchdowns in a single season by a rookie: 20 (2024)
- Highest passer rating in a single season by a rookie: 87.8 (2024)
- Most rushing yards in a single season by a rookie quarterback: 489 (2024)
- Most games with 300+ passing yards in a single season: 4 (2024; tied with Bill Wade, Jay Cutler, Brian Hoyer, and Mitchell Trubisky)
- Most games with 300+ passing yards and multiple passing touchdowns in a single season: 4 (2024; tied with Mitchell Trubisky)
- Best TD/INT ratio by a rookie quarterback: 3.33:1 (2024)
- First quarterback to have 200+ passing yards and a passing touchdown in five straight games (2025)
- First rookie quarterback with multiple games of 300+ passing yards (2024)
- Most game winning drives in a single season: 7 (2025)
- Most fourth quarter comebacks in a single season: 7 (2025)
- Most passing yards in a single game by a rookie: 363 (September 22, 2024, vs. Indianapolis Colts)
- First player with 250+ passing yards, 50+ rushing yards, 2 passing touchdowns, and 2 rushing touchdowns in a single game (September 13, 2026, vs. the Carolina Panthers)

==== USC school records ====
- Lowest interception rate in a career: 0.011
- Most rushing touchdowns by a quarterback in a career: 21
- Most yards of total offense in a single season: 4,919 (2022)
- Most total touchdowns in a single season: 52 (2022)
- Most completions in a single season: 333 (2022)
- Most passing attempts in a single season: 500 (2022)
- Most passing yards in a single season: 4,537 (2022)
- Most passing touchdowns in a single season: 42 (2022)
- Highest passer efficiency rating in a single season: 170.1 (2023)
- Highest average passing yards per game in a single season: 324.1 (2022)
- Highest average yards per completion in a single season: 9.4 (2023)
- Lowest interception rate in a single season: 0.01 (2022)
- Most rushing attempts by a quarterback in a single season: 113 (2022)
- Most rushing yards by a quarterback in a single season: 382 (2022)
- Most rushing touchdowns by a quarterback in a single season: 11 (2023)
- Most rushing and passing plays in a single season: 613 (2022)
- Most yards of total offense in a single game: 503 (November 19, 2022, vs. UCLA)

==== Oklahoma school records ====
- Most passing yards by a true freshman: 1,912 (2021)
- Most passing touchdowns by a true freshman: 21 (2021)
- Most passing touchdowns in a single game by a true freshman: 6 (October 30, 2021, vs. Texas Tech; tied with Kyler Murray and Landry Jones)
