= Nick McCloud =

American football player (born 1998)

- Nick Mccloud making a tackle against Deebo Samuel on Monday Night Football in Week 6 of the 2025 NFL Season.

Chicago Bears
- Position: Cornerback
- Roster status: Active

Personal information
- Born: July 9, 1998 (age 28); Lancaster, South Carolina, U.S.
- Listed height: 6 ft 1 in (1.85 m)
- Listed weight: 191 lb (87 kg)

Career information
- High school: South Pointe (Rock Hill)
- College: NC State (2016–2019); Notre Dame (2020)
- NFL draft: 2021: undrafted

Career history
- Buffalo Bills (2021)*; Cincinnati Bengals (2021); Buffalo Bills (2021); New York Giants (2022–2024); San Francisco 49ers (2024); Chicago Bears (2025); Miami Dolphins (2026)*; Chicago Bears (2026)
- * Offseason or practice squad member only

Career NFL statistics as of 2025
- Total tackles: 123
- Forced fumbles: 3
- Fumble recoveries: 3
- Pass deflections: 12
- Interceptions: 1
- Sacks: 1.5
- Stats at Pro Football Reference

Nick McCloud (born July 9, 1998) is an American professional football cornerback. He has previously played for the Cincinnati Bengals, New York Giants, and San Francisco 49ers. He played college football for the NC State Wolfpack and Notre Dame Fighting Irish.

== College career ==
He played college football at North Carolina State University and the University of Notre Dame.

While playing for Fighting Irish in the 2021 Rose Bowl, McCloud went viral after getting hurdled by Alabama runningback Najee Harris.

== Professional career ==
Pre-draft measurables
Height	Weight	Arm length	Hand span	Wingspan	40-yard dash	10-yard split	20-yard split	20-yard shuttle	Three-cone drill	Vertical jump	Bench press
6 ft 0 1/8 in (1.83 m)	193 lb (88 kg)	31 7/8 in (0.81 m)	9 1/2 in (0.24 m)	6 ft 4 1/8 in (1.93 m)	4.46 s	1.57 s	2.50 s	4.16 s	6.93 s	34.0 in (0.86 m)	12 reps
All values from Pro Day

=== Buffalo Bills (first stint) ===
McCloud signed with the Buffalo Bills as an undrafted free agent on May 1, 2021. He was waived by Buffalo during final roster cuts on August 31.

=== Cincinnati Bengals ===
McCloud was claimed off waivers by the Cincinnati Bengals on September 1, 2021. He was waived by the Bengals on November 4.

=== Buffalo Bills (second stint) ===
On November 8, 2021, McCloud was signed to the Buffalo Bills' practice squad. After the Bills were eliminated in the Divisional Round of the 2021 playoffs, he signed a reserve/future contract with the team on January 24, 2022. McCloud was waived by the Bills on August 30.

=== New York Giants ===
On August 31, 2022, McCloud was claimed off waivers by the New York Giants.

In a 2023 Week 11 game against the Washington Commanders, McCloud recorded an interception, a forced fumble, and a pass deflection. McCloud ended the 2023 season with 28 tackles, three forced fumbles, three fumble recoveries, an interception, and two pass deflections.

On November 5, 2024, McCloud was waived by the Giants. This came after a long disagreement with the front office that wanted him to take a midseason pay cut on the one-year, $3 million contract he had signed in March. After McCloud refused, Giants general manager Joe Schoen made a threat toward his agents and said: "Don't pay October's rent, all right? As soon as I can replace him, I'm going to replace him. I'm not fucking around".

=== San Francisco 49ers ===
On November 11, 2024, McCloud was signed to the San Francisco 49ers' practice squad. On November 30, McCloud was promoted to the active roster.

=== Chicago Bears (first stint) ===
On March 24, 2025, McCloud signed a one-year contract with the Chicago Bears.

He entered the regular season as the backup left cornerback behind Tyrique Stevenson. Injuries among the starters led to increased action for McCloud on defense that included starting four games. McCloud was targeted 32 times, allowing 26 catches for 322 yards and five touchdowns while breaking up two passes. Although initially signed since he could provide special teams support, he did not play for the unit in 2025.

=== Miami Dolphins ===
McCloud was signed by the Miami Dolphins on August 10, 2026. On August 22, he was released by the Dolphins.

=== Chicago Bears (second stint) ===
On September 22, 2026, McCloud was signed to the Chicago Bears' practice squad. He was promoted to the active roster ahead on October 17 ahead of the Week 6 game against the Atlanta Falcons, where he recovered a fumble on a kickoff return. He was released on October 27.

== Career statistics ==
=== NFL ===
Legend
	Led the league
**Bold**	Career high

==== Regular season ====
Year	Team	Games		Tackles						Interceptions						Fumbles				
Year	Team	GP	GS	Total	Solo	Ast	Sck	TFL	Sfty	PD	Int	Yds	Avg	Lng	TD	FF	Fum	FR	Yds	TD
2021	CIN	2	0	0	0	0	0.0	0	0	0	0	0	0.0	0	0	0	0	0	0	0
2022	NYG	14	8	**43**	**35**	8	**1.5**	**2**	0	**7**	0	0	0.0	0	0	0	0	0	0	0
2023	NYG	17	3	28	20	8	0.0	0	0	2	**1**	0	0.0	0	0	**3**	**1**	**3**	**1**	0
2024	NYG	7	5	14	10	4	0.0	1	0	1	0	0	0.0	0	0	0	0	0	0	0
2024	SF	8	0	11	4	7	0.0	0	0	0	0	0	0.0	0	0	0	0	0	0	0
2025	CHI	15	4	27	18	**9**	0.0	0	0	2	0	0	0.0	0	0	0	0	0	0	0
Career		63	20	123	87	36	1.5	3	0	12	1	0	0.0	0	0	3	1	3	1	0

==== Postseason ====
Year	Team	Games		Tackles						Interceptions						Fumbles				
Year	Team	GP	GS	Total	Solo	Ast	Sck	TFL	Sfty	PD	Int	Yds	Avg	Lng	TD	FF	Fum	FR	Yds	TD
2022	NYG	2	0	**3**	**2**	**1**	0.0	0	0	0	0	0	0.0	0	0	**1**	0	0	0	0
2025	CHI	1	1	0	0	0	0.0	0	0	0	0	0	0.0	0	0	0	0	0	0	0
Career		3	1	3	2	1	0.0	0	0	0	0	0	0.0	0	0	1	0	0	0	0

=== College ===
Year	Team	Games		Tackles				Interceptions				Fumbles		
Year	Team	GP	GS	Total	Solo	Ast	Sack	PD	Int	Yds	TD	FF	FR	TD
2016	NC State	11	1	15	13	2	0.0	3	0	0	0	0	0	0
2017	NC State	13	7	34	22	12	0.0	7	1	53	0	0	0	0
2018	NC State	11	11	51	34	17	0.0	8	2	23	0	0	1	0
2019	NC State	2	2	7	3	4	0.0	2	0	0	0	0	0	0
2020	Notre Dame	12	11	33	22	11	0.0	8	1	0	0	0	2	0
Career		49	32	140	94	46	0.0	28	4	76	0	0	3	0
