= Jahdae Walker =

American football player (born 2002)

No. 9 – Chicago Bears
- Position: Wide receiver
- Roster status: Active

Personal information
- Born: July 5, 2002 (age 24); Cleveland, Ohio, U.S.
- Listed height: 6 ft 3 in (1.91 m)
- Listed weight: 206 lb (93 kg)

Career information
- High school: Shaker Heights (Shaker Heights, Ohio)
- College: Grand Valley State (2021–2022); Texas A&M (2023–2024)
- NFL draft: 2025: undrafted

Career history
- Chicago Bears (2025–present)

Career NFL statistics as of Week 8, 2026
- Receptions: 7
- Receiving yards: 88
- Receiving touchdowns: 3
- Stats at Pro Football Reference

Jahdae Walker (born July 5, 2002) is an American professional football wide receiver for the Chicago Bears of the National Football League (NFL). He played college football for the Grand Valley State Lakers and Texas A&M Aggies.

== Early life ==
Walker attended Shaker Heights High School located in Shaker Heights, Ohio. Coming out of high school, he committed to play college football for the Grand Valley State Lakers.

== College career ==
=== Grand Valley State ===
During his true freshman season in 2021, he notched two receptions for 28 yards. In the 2022 season, Walker broke out, hauling in 30 passes for 636 yards and four touchdowns. After the conclusion of the 2022 season, he decided to enter his name into the NCAA transfer portal.

=== Texas A&M ===
Walker transferred to play for the Texas A&M Aggies. During his first season with the Aggies in 2023, he hauled in 35 receptions for 590 yards and two touchdowns, while also blocking a punt. In week 13 of the 2024 season, Walker recorded seven catches for 69 yards and a touchdown versus Auburn. In the 2024 season, He hauled in 29 receptions for 290 yards and two touchdowns. After the conclusion of the 2024 season, Walker decided to declare for the 2025 NFL Draft.

=== Statistics ===
| Year | Team | Games | | Receiving | | | |
| Year | Team | GP | GS | Rec | Yds | Avg | TD |
|---|---|---|---|---|---|---|---|
| 2023 | Texas A&M | 13 | 7 | 35 | 590 | 16.9 | 2 |
| 2024 | Texas A&M | 13 | 9 | 29 | 345 | 11.9 | 2 |
| Career | | 26 | 16 | 64 | 935 | 14.6 | 4 |

== Professional career ==
Pre-draft measurables
| Height | Weight | Arm length | Hand span | Wingspan | 40-yard dash | 10-yard split | 20-yard split | 20-yard shuttle | Three-cone drill | Vertical jump | Broad jump | Bench press |
|---|---|---|---|---|---|---|---|---|---|---|---|---|
| 6 ft 2 7/8 in (1.90 m) | 199 lb (90 kg) | 33 1/2 in (0.85 m) | 9 7/8 in (0.25 m) | 6 ft 7 1/2 in (2.02 m) | 4.45 s | 1.58 s | 2.62 s | 4.13 s | 6.71 s | 34.5 in (0.88 m) | 10 ft 3 in (3.12 m) | 10 reps |
All values from Pro Day

After not being selected in the 2025 NFL draft, Walker signed with the Chicago Bears as an undrafted free agent. During his NFL preseason debut, he recorded three receptions for 41 yards and a touchdown in a 24–24 tie against the Miami Dolphins. In the preseason finale, Walker caught three passes including the game-winning touchdown to beat the Kansas City Chiefs. He was the only undrafted rookie to earn a spot on the Bears' 53-man roster. In Week 16, Walker scored his first NFL touchdown to tie the game against the Green Bay Packers, setting the stage for the Bears' overtime victory. He also caught a 25-yard touchdown pass in the season finale.

Walker began the 2026 season by scoring a one-yard touchdown on his lone catch in the Bears' 59–37 win over the Carolina Panthers. After the game, he was fined $5,620 for taunting a Panthers player after blocking for teammate Kalif Raymond.

== NFL career statistics ==
=== Regular season ===
| Year | Team | Games | | Receiving | | | | | Fumbles | |
| Year | Team | GP | GS | Rec | Yds | Avg | Lng | TD | Fum | Lost |
|---|---|---|---|---|---|---|---|---|---|---|
| 2025 | CHI | 9 | 1 | 6 | 87 | 14.5 | 25 | 2 | 0 | 0 |

=== Postseason ===
| Year | Team | Games | | Receiving | | | | | Fumbles | |
| Year | Team | GP | GS | Rec | Yds | Avg | Lng | TD | Fum | Lost |
|---|---|---|---|---|---|---|---|---|---|---|
| 2025 | CHI | 0 | 0 | 0 | 0 | 0 | 0 | 0 | 0 | 0 |
