= Chris Williams (defensive tackle) =

American football player (born 1998)

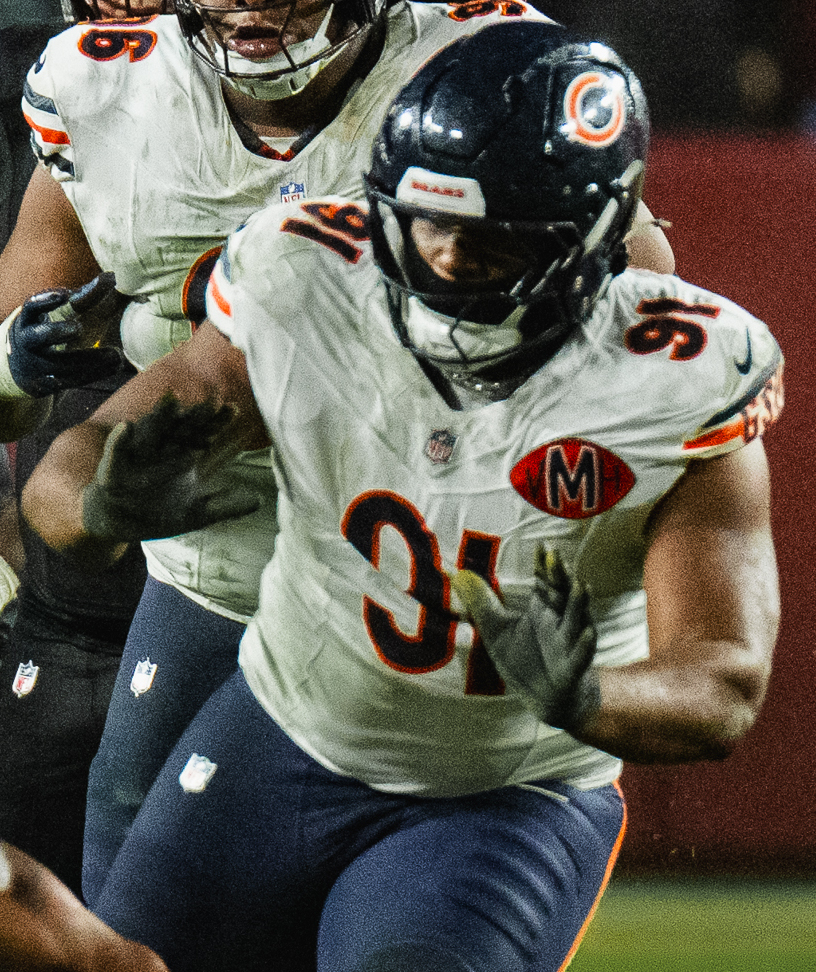
- Williams with the Chicago Bears in 2025

No. 72 – Las Vegas Raiders
- Position: Defensive tackle
- Roster status: Practice squad

Personal information
- Born: June 16, 1998 (age 28); Brooklyn, New York, U.S.
- Listed height: 6 ft 2 in (1.88 m)
- Listed weight: 298 lb (135 kg)

Career information
- High school: Lafayette (Brooklyn)
- College: Wagner (2016–2019)
- NFL draft: 2020: undrafted

Career history
- Indianapolis Colts (2020–2022); Kansas City Chiefs (2023)*; Cleveland Browns (2023)*; Chicago Bears (2024–2025); Atlanta Falcons (2026)*; Cleveland Browns (2026); Las Vegas Raiders (2026–present)
- * Offseason or practice squad member only

Career NFL statistics as of Week 6, 2026
- Total tackles: 44
- Sacks: 4.0
- Stats at Pro Football Reference

Chris Williams (born June 16, 1998) is an American professional football defensive tackle for the Las Vegas Raiders of the National Football League (NFL). He played college football for the Wagner Seahawks and was signed by the Indianapolis Colts in 2020 as an undrafted free agent.

== College career ==
Williams was a member of the Wagner Seahawks for four seasons. While playing for the Seahawks, Williams recorded 105 tackles (41 solo) 22.0 tackles for a loss, 6 sacks 3 forced fumble, a single fumble recovery and 3 blocked kicks. Williams also earned Second-team All-NEC honors in 2018. In his senior season debut against UConn, he had 11 tackles. During Williams's senior year in 2019, he had 62 tackles, including four sacks and 11.5 tackles for loss. Williams earned First-team All-NEC honors.

== Professional career ==
Pre-draft measurables
Height	Weight	Arm length	Hand span	Wingspan	40-yard dash	10-yard split	20-yard split	20-yard shuttle	Three-cone drill	Vertical jump	Broad jump	Bench press
6 ft 2 1/8 in (1.88 m)	302 lb (137 kg)	34 3/4 in (0.88 m)	10 3/8 in (0.26 m)	6 ft 8 5/8 in (2.05 m)	5.19 s	1.75 s	2.94 s	4.88 s	7.90 s	27.0 in (0.69 m)	9 ft 1 in (2.77 m)	23 reps
All values from Pro Day

=== Indianapolis Colts ===
Williams was signed by the Indianapolis Colts following the 2020 NFL draft to their practice squad.

In his first two preseason games in 2021, Williams recorded four tackles and one quarterback hurry and was praised by defensive tackle DeForest Buckner. On August 31, it was announced that Williams made the initial 53-man roster. He played in four games before being waived on October 19, but was re-signed to the practice squad. He signed a reserve/future contract with Indianapolis on January 10, 2022.

On August 30, 2022, Williams was waived by the Colts and signed to the practice squad the next day. He was promoted to the active roster on October 11. He was waived on May 4, 2023.

=== Kansas City Chiefs ===
On May 10, 2023, Williams signed with the Kansas City Chiefs. He was waived on August 29, and re-signed to the practice squad, but later released.

=== Cleveland Browns ===
On December 19, 2023, Williams was signed to the Cleveland Browns' practice squad. He signed a reserve/future contract with Cleveland on January 15, 2024.

=== Chicago Bears ===
On August 24, 2024, Williams and a seventh-round pick were traded to the Chicago Bears in exchange for a sixth-round pick. In Week 6, Williams recorded his first career sack against the Jacksonville Jaguars in one of the year's NFL London Games.

=== Atlanta Falcons ===
On March 13, 2026, Williams signed a one-year, $2 million contract with the Atlanta Falcons. On August 30, Williams was released by the Falcons during final roster cuts.

=== Cleveland Browns (second stint) ===
On September 1, 2026, Williams signed with the Cleveland Browns' practice squad. On September 15, he was released by the Browns. On October 6, Williams was re-signed to the practice squad. On October 20, he was released.

=== Las Vegas Raiders ===
On November 11, 2026, Williams signed with the Las Vegas Raiders practice squad.
