= Daniel Hardy (defensive end) =

American football player (born 1998)

No. 92 – Chicago Bears
- Position: Defensive end
- Roster status: Active

Personal information
- Born: December 15, 1998 (age 27); Portland, Oregon, U.S.
- Listed height: 6 ft 2 in (1.88 m)
- Listed weight: 255 lb (116 kg)

Career information
- High school: Valley Catholic School (Beaverton, Oregon)
- College: Siskiyous (2017); Montana State (2018–2021)
- NFL draft: 2022: 7th round, 235th overall pick

Career history
- Los Angeles Rams (2022); Chicago Bears (2023–present)

Awards and highlights
- Second-team FCS All-American (2021); First-team All-Big Sky (2021)

Career NFL statistics as of 2025
- Total tackles: 38
- Forced fumbles: 1
- Stats at Pro Football Reference

Daniel Hardy (born December 15, 1998) is an American professional football defensive end for the Chicago Bears of the National Football League (NFL). He played college football at College of the Siskiyous and Montana State.

== Professional career ==
Pre-draft measurables
Height	Weight	Arm length	Hand span	Wingspan	40-yard dash	10-yard split	20-yard split	20-yard shuttle	Three-cone drill	Vertical jump	Broad jump	Bench press
6 ft 2 1/8 in (1.88 m)	239 lb (108 kg)	33 1/2 in (0.85 m)	10 in (0.25 m)	6 ft 9 in (2.06 m)	4.69 s	1.57 s	2.68 s	4.33 s	6.71 s	40.0 in (1.02 m)	10 ft 7 in (3.23 m)	20 reps
All values from Pro Day

=== Los Angeles Rams ===
Hardy was selected in the seventh round of the 2022 NFL draft by the Los Angeles Rams. He was placed on injured reserve on September 1, 2022. He was designated to return from injured reserve on November 30, 2022. He was activated from injured reserve three days later. He was waived on August 29, 2023.

=== Chicago Bears ===
On August 31, 2023, Hardy was signed to the practice squad of the Chicago Bears. He signed a reserve/future contract with Chicago on January 8, 2024.

On April 8, 2025, Hardy signed his exclusive rights free agent contract with the Bears. In Week 17 against the San Francisco 49ers, he entered the game as a fullback to block for D'Andre Swift, who ran for a 22-yard touchdown.

On March 12, 2026, Hardy re-signed with the Bears on a two-year, $4.97 million contract.
