= Cheverly–Washington Business Park Line =

F13
- Cheverly–Washington Business Park Line

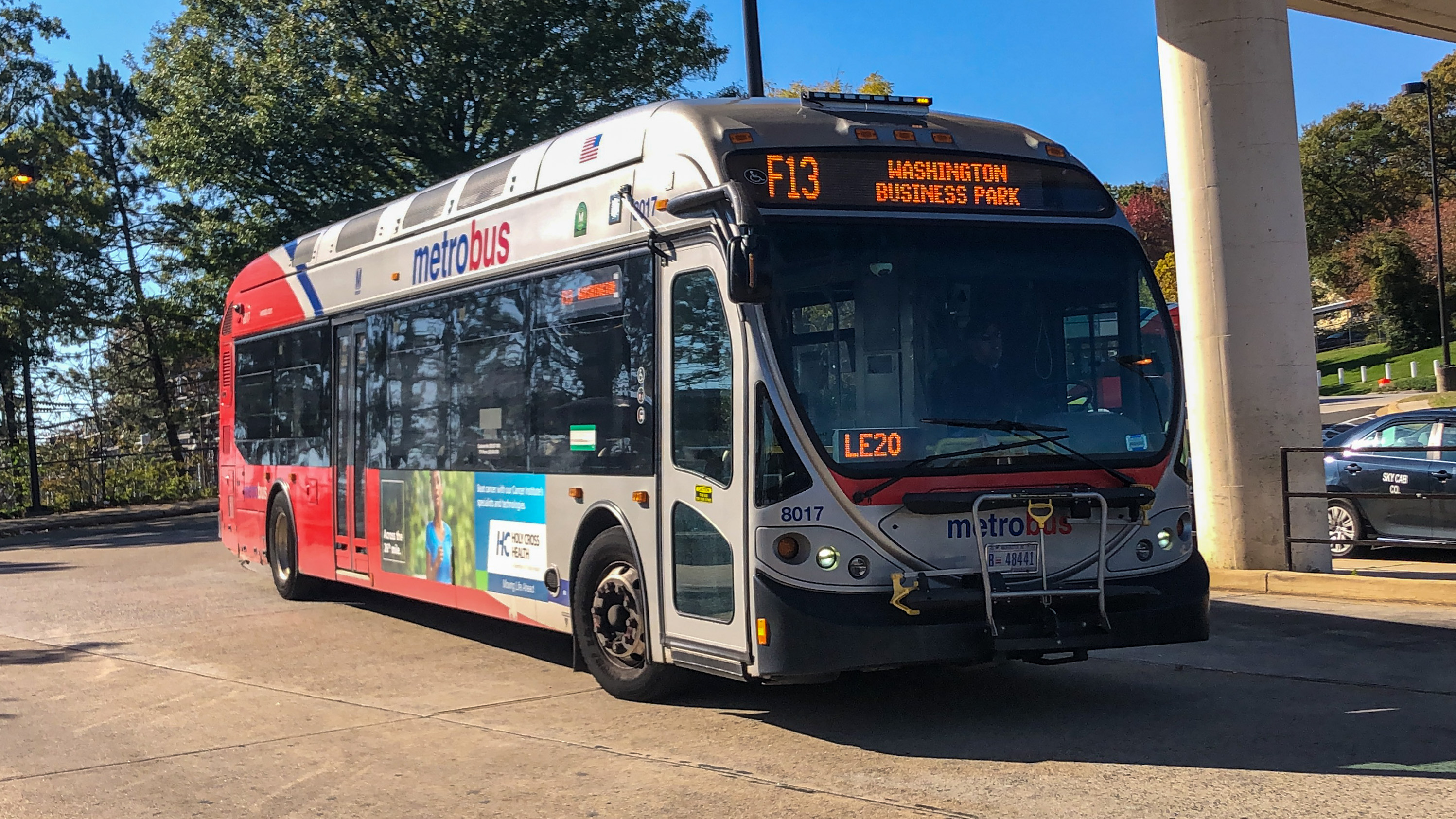
- Route F13 at New Carrollton station

Overview
- System: Metrobus
- Operator: Washington Metropolitan Area Transit Authority
- Garage: Landover
- Livery: Local
- Status: Replaced by TheBus routes P22, and P23
- Began service: December 11, 1993
- Ended service: June 29, 2025

Route
- Locale: Prince George's County, Maryland
- Communities served: New Carrollton, Landover, Lanham, Springdale, West Lanham Hills, Landover Hills, Cheverly
- Landmarks served: Prince George’s Hospital, New Carrollton station
- Start: Cheverly station
- Via: Annapolis Road, Whitfield Chapel Road, Martin Luther King Jr. Highway
- End: Washington Business Park (Forbes Blvd & Senate Drive)
- Length: 55 minutes

Service
- Level: Weekdays only
- Frequency: 30-33 minutes (Weekday peak hour); 60 minutes (All other times)
- Operates: 6:00 AM - 7:57 PM
- Ridership: 154,197 (FY 2024)
- Transfers: SmarTrip only
- Timetable: Cheverly–Washington Business Park Line

The Cheverly–Washington Business Park Line, designated Route F13, was a weekday only bus route operated by the Washington Metropolitan Area Transit Authority between Cheverly station of the Silver and Orange lines of the Washington Metro and Washington Business Park (Forbes Blvd & Senate Drive) in Lanham, Maryland. The line ran every 30–33 minutes during rush hours and 60 minutes at all other times on weekdays only. Trips roughly took 55 minutes to complete. The route was discontinued during WMATA's Better Bus Redesign on June 29, 2025 with portions of the route taken over by TheBus.

== Background ==
Route F13 operated on weekdays, operating between Cheverly station and Washington Business Park and connecting passengers via New Carrollton station and Prince Georges Hospital. Route F13 operated out of Landover division.

== History ==
Route F13 initially started by WMATA on November 21, 1978, when New Carrollton station opened. The F13 replaced route A13, which was discontinued on November 21, 1978, which used to operate on Martin Luther King Jr. Highway, up to Washington Business Park in Lanham, Maryland. Route F13 operated between the New Carrollton station and Washington Business Park in Lanham, MD via Garden City Drive, Ardwick-Ardmore Road, Martin Luther King Jr. Highway, Boston Way, Forbes Road, Philadelphia Way, Forbes Road, Martin Luther King Junior Highway, Lottsford Road, and Forbes Road as part of the Ardwick Industrial Park Shuttle Line running alongside route F12.

The F13 was also rerouted to operate between the New Carrollton Metro Station and Washington Business Park via Ellin Road, Harkins Road, Annapolis Road, Whitfield Chapel Road, Martin Luther King Jr. Highway, instead of its original routing between the New Carrollton and Washington Business Park via Garden City Drive, Ardwick-Ardmore Road, and Martin Luther King Jr. Highway. The former routing was replaced by route F14.

On December 11, 1993, route F13 was extended from New Carrollton station to Cheverly station via Ellin Road, Harkins Road, Annapolis Road, Cooper Lane, Old Landover Road, Landover Road, Prince George's Hospital Roadway, Aaron Deitz Drive, Prince George's Hospital Roadway, Cheverly Avenue, and Columbia Park Road.The extension was to provide additionally service on Cheverly Avenue to route F8, since routes F1 and F2 were rerouted to no longer operate on Cheverly Avenue.

In 2012, WMATA proposed to eliminate Route F13 and have multiple bus routes replace the route. WMATA proposed to reroute the F1 and F2 along Landover Road, Cooper Lane, and Annapolis Road on weekdays to replace part of the western half of the F13. Routes B24 and B25 would replace part of the eastern half of the F13, operating along Whitfield Chapel Road. A new loop line would operate on the F13 portion between New Carrollton station and Washington Business Park with an extension to Springdale.

On June 25, 2017, route F13 was rerouted near Washington Business Park discontinuing service along Boston Way. From northbound Martin Luther King, Jr. Highway, buses will operate to Lottsford-Vista Road, Forbes Boulevard and Philadelphia Way before returning to southbound Martin Luther King, Jr. Highway. Nearby stops will be served along Forbes Boulevard at Boston Way.

All service was suspended during the COVID-19 pandemic beginning on March 18, 2020. The line resumed service on August 23, 2020 with reduced frequencies. Full service was restored on September 5, 2021.

In 2024 during WMATA's FY2024 Budget crisis, WMATA proposed to eliminate all F13 service. However on April 25, 2024, Metro’s Board of Directors approved a $4.8 billion capital and operating budget which avoided service cuts.

=== Better Bus Redesign ===
In 2022, WMATA launched its Better Bus Redesign project, which aimed to redesign the entire Metrobus Network and is the first full redesign of the agency's bus network in its history.

In April 2023, WMATA launched its Draft Visionary Network. As part of the drafts, WMATA proposed to split the F13 into two different routes from New Carrollton station. The F13 portion between Cheverly station and New Carrollton station via Cheverly Avenue, Hospital Center Drive, Prince George's Hospital, Landover Road, Old Landover Road, Cooper Lane, Annapolis Road, Harkins Road, and Ellin Road remained the same and was renamed to Route MD352. The F13 portion between New Carrollton and Washington Business Park was combined with Route B24 and was changed to operate from the east side of New Carrollton station and operate to Goddard Corporate Park as Route MD353 via Pennsy Drive, Ardwick Ardmore Road, Whitfield Chapel Road, Annapolis Road, Forbes Boulevard, Lottsford Vista Road, Annapolis Road, Fairwood Parkway, Hillmeade Road, Daisy Lane, Glenn Dale Road, Prospect Hill Road, Glenn Dale Boulevard, Greenbelt Road, and Mission Drive.

During WMATA's Revised Draft Visionary Network, Route MD353 was taken over by TheBus and was renamed to Route P23. The route would follow a similar route to the original proposed Route MD353, but would not operate along Hillmeade Road or Daisy Lane, and instead after serving Fariwood, the route would operate along Glenn Dale Road to Goddard Corporate Park via Fairwood Parkway, Bell Station Road, Glenn Dale Road, Glenn Dale Splash Park, Prospect Hill Road, Glenn Dale Boulevard, Greenbelt Road, and Mission Drive. Route MD352 was also taken over by TheBus and combined with the current TheBus Route 16 and renamed to Route P22. The new P22 would follow a modified routing of Route 16 between Greenbelt station and New Carrollton station (with service inside the Berwyn Heights neighborhood being discontinued), and a modified routing of WMATA Route F13 between New Carrollton station and Cheverly station via Harkins Road, Annapolis Road, Cooper Lane, Warner Avenue, Old Landover Road, Landover Road, and Cheverly Road. Trips between New Carrollton station and Cheverly station would operate only on weekdays. All changes were then proposed during WMATA's 2025 Proposed Network.

On November 21, 2024, WMATA approved its Better Bus Redesign Network.

Beginning on June 29, 2025, Route F13 was discontinued and taken over by TheBus and split into two routes. The F13 portion between Cheverly station and New Carrollton Station was combined with TheBus Route 16 and renamed into TheBus Route P22, with service being modified in Landover Hills to have new service along Warner Avenue. Service would operate between Greenbelt station and Cheverly station on weekdays only, with Saturday service ending at New Carrollton station. The F13 portion between New Carrollton and Washington Business Park was combined with Route B24 and operated up to Fairwood Parkway and renamed to TheBus Route P23. Service would also operate in a loop around Washington Business Park. The proposed service between Fairwood Parkway and Goddard Corporate Park was not included in the final route.
