= Ardwick Industrial Park Shuttle Line =

F12
- Ardwick Industrial Park Shuttle

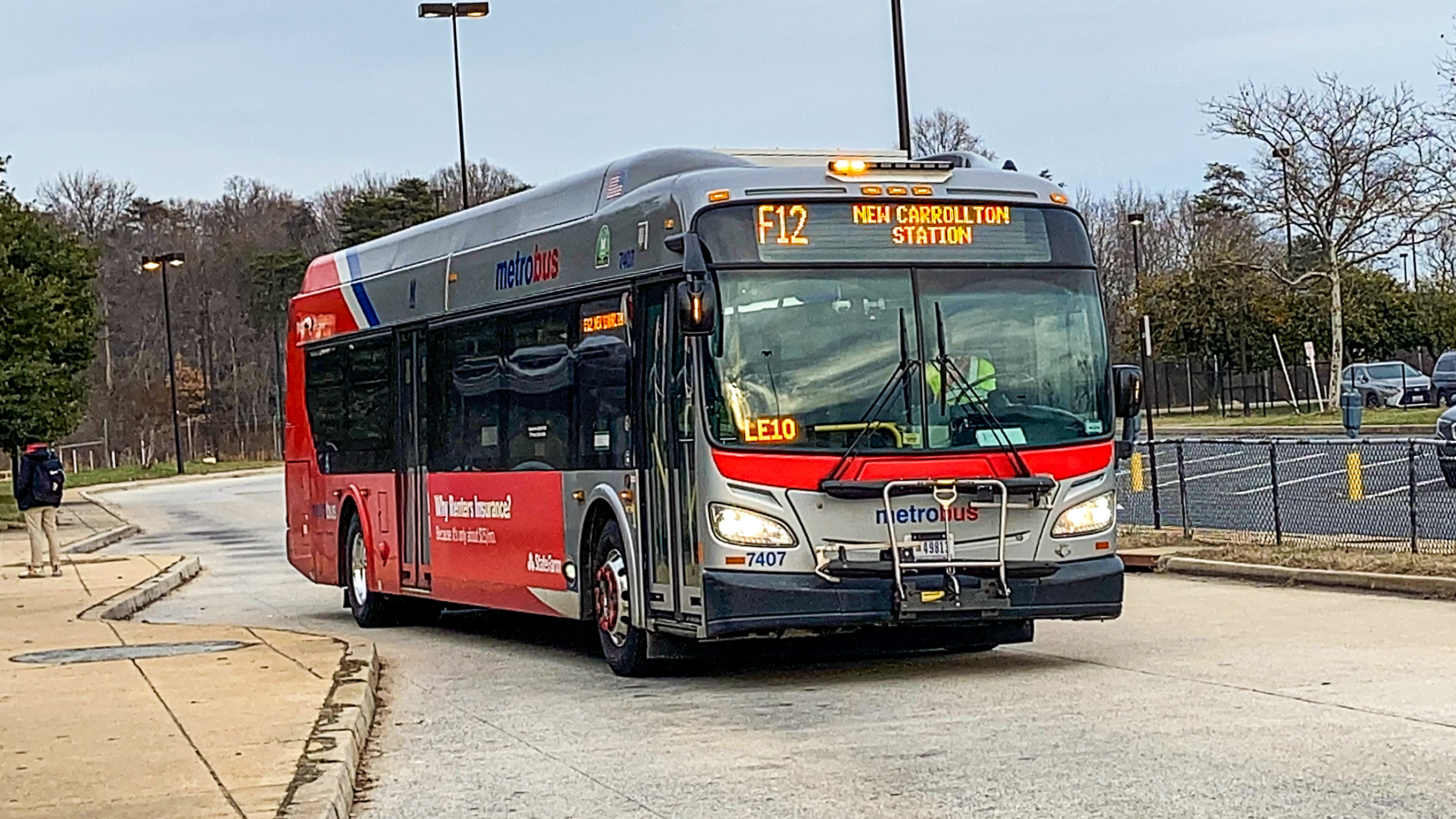
- Route F12 at Landover Station

Overview
- System: Metrobus
- Operator: Washington Metropolitan Area Transit Authority
- Garage: Landover
- Livery: Local
- Status: Discontinued
- Began service: December 3, 1978
- Ended service: June 29, 2025

Route
- Locale: Prince George's County
- Communities served: New Carrollton, Landover, Hyattsville, Dodge Park, Kentland, Columbia Park, Cheverly
- Landmarks served: New Carrollton station, Metro East Office Park, Ardwick Industrial Park, Landover station, Columbia Park, Kentland, Kent Village, Cheverly station
- Start: New Carrollton station
- Via: Pennsy Drive, Landover Road, Martin Luther King Highway
- End: Cheverly station
- Length: 35-37 minutes

Service
- Level: Weekdays Only
- Frequency: 35-60 minutes
- Operates: 5:40 AM – 7:39 PM
- Ridership: 112,510 (FY 2024)
- Transfers: SmarTrip only
- Timetable: Ardwick Industrial Park Shuttle Line

The Ardwick Industrial Park Shuttle Line, designated Route F12, was a weekday-only bus route operated by the Washington Metropolitan Area Transit Authority between the New Carrollton station and Cheverly station on the Silver and Orange Lines of the Washington Metro. The line operated every 35–37 minutes during peak hours and 60 minutes all other times, weekdays only. F12 trips were roughly 30 minutes. The route was discontinued during WMATA's Better Bus Redesign on June 29, 2025 with portions of the route taken over by TheBus.

== Background ==
Route F12 operated weekdays only between New Carrollton station and Cheverly station. Route F12 got its buses out of Landover division. Prior to 1989, route F12 would get its buses out of Southern Avenue division.

== History ==
Route F12 was created as a brand new Metrobus Route by WMATA on December 3, 1978, when New Carrollton & Landover stations opened. Route F12 was designed to operate between New Carrollton & Landover stations, via Ardwick Industrial Park on Weekdays only via Garden City Drive, Pennsy Drive, Ardwick-Ardmore Road, Jefferson Avenue, Polk Street, and Pennsy Drive. When operating to New Carrollton, it would make a right turn from the intersection of Ardwick-Ardmore Road onto the intersection of Pennsy Drive because Ardwick-Ardmore Road is only a one-way street between the intersections of Garden City Drive & Pennsy Drive and will operate along Corporate Drive and Garden City Drive to serve New Carrollton. Route F12 will also serve an extra loop serving Metro East Office Park after serving New Carrollton.

On December 11, 1993, route F12 was extended from Landover station, to operate up to Cheverly station, in order to replace the segment of the former route F3 routing between Cheverly station & Columbia Park subdivision of Landover when route F3 was discontinued. Route F12 would keep operating its same routing between New Carrollton & Landover stations but would operate between Landover & Cheverly stations, via Pennsy Drive, Old Landover Road, Landover Road, Martin Luther King Jr. Highway, Columbia Park Road, East Marlboro Avenue, Flagstaff Street, Kent Village Drive, and Columbia Park Road.

In February 2020 during WMATA's FY2021 budget, WMATA proposed to discontinue route F12 as part of fiscal year 2021 budget due to low ridership. However WMATA later backed out the elimination.

All service was suspended during the COVID-19 pandemic beginning on March 18, 2020. The line resumed service on August 23, 2020 with reduced frequencies. Full service was restored on September 5, 2021.

On December 17, 2023, the F13 was changed to operate along Forbes Boulevard and Business Parkway on all trips, eliminating service on Philadelphia Way.

In 2024 during WMATA's FY2024 Budget crisis, WMATA proposed to eliminate all F12 service. However on April 25, 2024, Metro’s Board of Directors approved a $4.8 billion capital and operating budget which avoided service cuts.

=== Better Bus Redesign ===
In 2022, WMATA launched its Better Bus Redesign project, which aimed to redesign the entire Metrobus Network and is the first full redesign of the agency's bus network in its history.

In April 2023, WMATA launched its Draft Visionary Network. As part of the drafts, WMATA proposed to modify the F12 to operate along Hubbard Road and Dodge Park Road in Landover, and to operate to the Office Park first instead of New Carrollton station. The line would be named Route MD359.

During WMATA's Revised Draft Visionary Network, WMATA modified the MD359 to operate closely to the current Route F12 and was renamed to Route P44. The P44 would operate on the current F12 routing between Cheverly station and New Carrollton station, but the route would not operate along Hubbard Road or Dodge Park Road, and instead have the proposed Route P52 (current TheBus Route 27) operate through it instead. TheBus would also operate the P44 instead of WMATA. All changes were then proposed during WMATA's 2025 Proposed Network.

On November 21, 2024, WMATA approved its Better Bus Redesign Network.

Beginning on June 29, 2025, Route F12 was taken over by TheBus and was merged with Route 27 and renamed to Route P44. Prior to the start of the new service, TheBus would heavily modifiy the P44. The P44 would follow the F12 portion between New Carrollton station and the intersection of Landover Road & Fire House Road, then would operate via Fire House Road, Kent Village Drive, Columbia Park Road, and Martin Luther King Jr Highway before resuming TheBus 27 routing to Downtown Largo station via Greenleaf Road, Barlowe Road, Allendale Drive, Prince George's Sports and Learning Complex, Sheriff Road, Brightseat Road, Medical Center Drive, and Harry S Turman Drive. Service to Cheverly station was taken over by TheBus Route P43.
