= Landover, Maryland =

Census-designated place in Maryland, US

- Unincorporated community Census designated place
- Landover viewed from Maryland Route 202 in 2020

- Location within the State of Maryland Landover (the United States)
- Coordinates: 38°56′N 76°54′W
- Country: United States
- State: Maryland
- County: Prince George's
- Named for: Llandovery, Wales

Area
  - Total: 4.00 sq mi (10.37 km^{2})
  - Land: 4.00 sq mi (10.36 km^{2})
  - Water: 0.0039 sq mi (0.01 km^{2}) 0.13%

Population (2020)
  - Total: 25,998
  - Density: 6,499.5/sq mi (2,509.46/km^{2})
- Time zone: UTC−5 (Eastern (EST))
  - Summer (DST): UTC−4 (EDT)
- ZIP Code: 20785
- Area codes: 301, 240
- FIPS code: 24-45325
- GNIS feature ID: 597655

Landover is an unincorporated community and census-designated place in Prince George's County, Maryland, United States. As of the 2020 census, it had a population of 25,998.

Landover is contained between Sheriff Road and Central Avenue to the south, Hill Road, Cabin Branch Drive, and the Washington Metropolitan Area Transit Authority (Metro) Orange Line tracks to the west, John Hanson Highway (U.S. Highway 50) to the north, and Washington D.C.'s Capital Beltway (Interstate 495/95) to the east. Landover borders the communities of New Carrollton, Landover Hills, Glenarden, Lanham, Ardmore, Kentland, Cheverly, Chapel Oaks, Fairmount Heights, Carmody Hills, Pepper Mill Village, Walker Mill, and Largo.

== History ==
Landover was named after the town of Llandovery, Wales.

The former CDPs of Landover, Dodge Park, Kentland, and Palmer Park, defined as such by the U.S. Census Bureau in the 1990 U.S. census, were consolidated into the Greater Landover CDP as of the 2000 U.S. census. This amalgamated area was renamed the Landover CDP as of the 2010 U.S. census.

== Demographics ==
Historical population
Census	Pop.	Note	%±
1970	5,597		—
1980	5,374		−4.0%
1990	5,052		−6.0%
2000	22,900		353.3%
2010	23,078		0.8%
2020	25,998		12.7%
U.S. Decennial Census; 2010 2020; Listed as Greater Landover in 2000 after it was merged with Dodge Park, Palmer Park and Kentland; The name was restored as Landover in 2010

=== Racial and ethnic composition ===
Landover CDP, Maryland – Racial and ethnic composition Note: the US Census treats Hispanic/Latino as an ethnic category. This table excludes Latinos from the racial categories and assigns them to a separate category. Hispanics/Latinos may be of any race.
Race / Ethnicity (NH = Non-Hispanic)	Pop 2000	Pop 2010	Pop 2020	% 2000	% 2010	% 2020
White alone (NH)	761	450	606	3.32%	1.95%	2.33%
Black or African American alone (NH)	20,967	18,671	16,647	91.56%	80.90%	64.03%
Native American or Alaska Native alone (NH)	42	59	34	0.18%	0.26%	0.13%
Asian alone (NH)	117	151	669	0.51%	0.65%	2.57%
Native Hawaiian or Pacific Islander alone (NH)	0	7	13	0.00%	0.03%	0.05%
Other race alone (NH)	35	45	172	0.15%	0.19%	0.66%
Mixed race or Multiracial (NH)	315	336	726	1.38%	1.46%	2.79%
Hispanic or Latino (any race)	663	3,359	7,131	2.90%	14.55%	27.43%
Total	22,900	23,078	25,998	100.00%	100.00%	100.00%

=== 2020 census ===
As of the 2020 census, Landover had a population of 25,998. The median age was 33.5 years. 27.3% of residents were under the age of 18 and 10.2% of residents were 65 years of age or older. For every 100 females there were 89.3 males, and for every 100 females age 18 and over there were 84.9 males age 18 and over.

100.0% of residents lived in urban areas, while 0.0% lived in rural areas.

There were 8,769 households in Landover, of which 39.1% had children under the age of 18 living in them. Of all households, 32.2% were married-couple households, 20.4% were households with a male householder and no spouse or partner present, and 41.1% were households with a female householder and no spouse or partner present. About 25.6% of all households were made up of individuals and 7.5% had someone living alone who was 65 years of age or older.

There were 9,327 housing units, of which 6.0% were vacant. The homeowner vacancy rate was 1.6% and the rental vacancy rate was 6.3%.

Racial composition as of the 2020 census
Race	Number	Percent
White	1,035	4.0%
Black or African American	16,836	64.8%
American Indian and Alaska Native	247	1.0%
Asian	676	2.6%
Native Hawaiian and Other Pacific Islander	13	0.1%
Some other race	5,347	20.6%
Two or more races	1,844	7.1%

== Geography ==
Landover is located at 38.924°N 76.888°W. According to the U.S. Census Bureau, it has an area of 4.07 square miles (10.55 km^{2}), of which 0.004 square miles (0.01 km^{2}), or 0.13%, is water. Landover residents have the postal zipcode of 20785. Since Landover is an unincorporated community in Prince George's County, residents of Landover have Hyattsville postal addresses though they live in Landover and not Hyattsville. Landover does not have its own postal zipcode.

Landover consists of several small subdivisions which are notably Ardwick Park, Kentland, Kenmoor, Dodge Park, Brightseat, Palmer Park, Columbia Park, Village Green, White House Heights, and Summerfield. Landover is home to Northwest Stadium, which the NFL's Washington Commanders have played at since it opened in 1997. It is also home to the Prince George's Sports & Learning Complex, WMATA's Landover Metrobus Division, WMATA's Carmen E. Turner Maintenance Facility, Giant Food Corporate Office, Giant Food Corporate Plant, National Harmony Memorial Park Cemetery, and Ardwick Industrial Park. WMATA Metrorail's Orange Line from New Carrollton to Vienna, MARC train Line to the BWI Light Rail Station to Washington D.C.'s Union Station, Cargo Trains, and Amtrak's Train Line from Washington D.C.'s Union Station to New York's Penn Station via Wilmington and Philadelphia, all go through Landover. Landover Hills is a separate, incorporated community just across the Orange Line train tracks and John Hanson Highway (U.S. Highway 50) to the north. Landover is the birthplace of the late Len Bias. From 1960 to 1972, Landover was the home of jazz guitarist, composer, arranger, author, and jazz educator Steve Rochinski.

For the 2000 census, Landover was delineated by the U.S. Census Bureau as the Greater Landover census-designated place.

== Economy ==
Eight O'Clock Coffee's coffee production plant is located in Landover. Giant Food has its headquarters in a location in unincorporated Prince George's County in the Ardwick Industrial Park area, near Landover. The Giant Food Headquarters is located next to the New Carrollton Metro Station. It is served by the F13 metrobus shuttle that goes from the Cheverly Metro station to Washington Business Park.

== Arts and culture ==
Beall's Pleasure and Ridgley Methodist Episcopal Church are listed on the National Register of Historic Places. A Harlem Renaissance Festival occurs at Kentland-Columbia Park Community Center in Landover every year in May. In 2014, the National Archives for Black Women's History was controversially relocated from Washington, D.C., to 3300 Hubbard Road in Landover.

== Sports ==
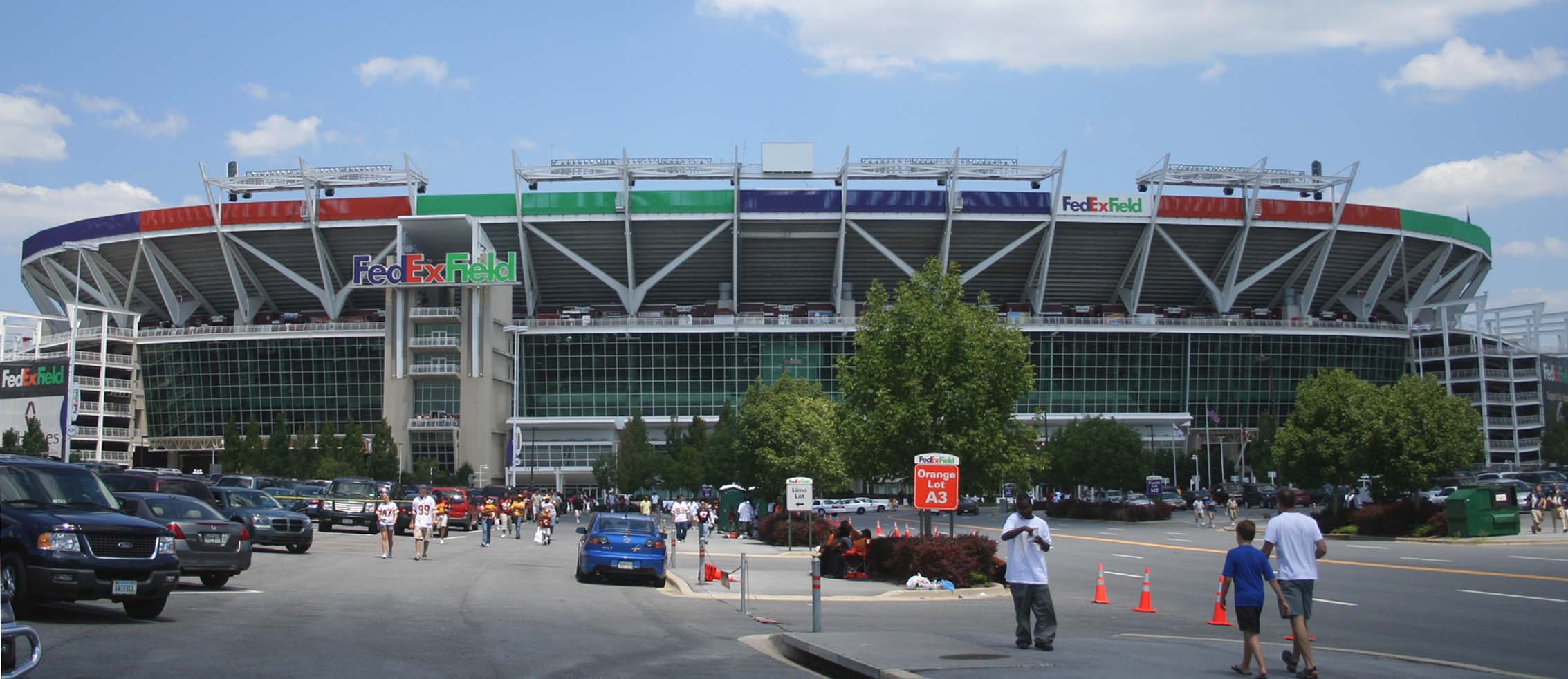
Northwest Stadium (then known as FedEx Field), the home field of the National Football League (NFL)'s Washington Commanders

Northwest Stadium is a football stadium for the Washington Commanders of the National Football League in the neighboring CDP of Summerfield and has a Landover postal address. (See also Raljon, Maryland.) The Washington Wizards and Washington Capitals used to play in Landover's Capital Centre (later known as the US Airways Arena) before moving to the Capital One Arena, inside D.C itself. The arena was demolished in 2002.

The Prince George's Sports & Learning Complex is also in Summerfield CDP, located on approximately 80 acres (320,000 m^{2}) adjacent to FedExField.

== Government ==
Prince George's County Police Department headquarters, which is also District 3 Station, is in the Palmer Park area in Landover CDP.

The U.S. Postal Service operates the Landover Post Office in the CDP.

== Education ==
=== Public education ===
Landover is a part of the Prince George's County Public Schools system.

Elementary schools serving sections of the Landover CDP include: Columbia Park, Dodge Park, Cooper Lane, Gladys Noon Spellman, Highland Park, and William Paca. Middle schools serving sections of the Landover CDP include: G. James Gholson, Kenmoor, and Charles Carroll. Senior high schools serving sections of the Landover CDP include: Fairmont Heights, Charles Herbert Flowers, DuVal, and Bladensburg and Central High School (Maryland) The schools serving the 1990 CDP are: Cooper Lane and Gladys Noon Spellman elementaries, Charles Carroll Middle, and Bladensburg High.

When desegregation busing began in 1972, PG County school officials bused many black children in Landover to schools with large numbers of white students in other areas of the county. Since then many schools in the Landover area had closed. David Nakamura of The Washington Post stated that many Landover residents believed that desegregation busing contributed to the socioeconomic decline of Landover. In 1998 the busing program was abolished due to a settlement in federal court.

Matthew Henson Elementary School was previously in the CDP. It was scheduled to close in 2009. In 2012 EXCEL Academy agreed to open a charter school in the former Henson space, and it moved from its previous campus in Riverdale.

Other area schools:

- Kenmoor Elementary School
- Palmer Park Elementary School
- Columbia Park Elementary School
- John Carroll Elementary School - closed in 2009
- Cora L. Rice Elementary School
- Thomas Pullen Creative & Performing Arts Academy

=== Colleges and universities ===
Landover had career-based colleges, such as Fortis College, that offer programs including bio-technician, medical assisting, and medical coding and billing.

== Infrastructure ==
=== Transportation ===
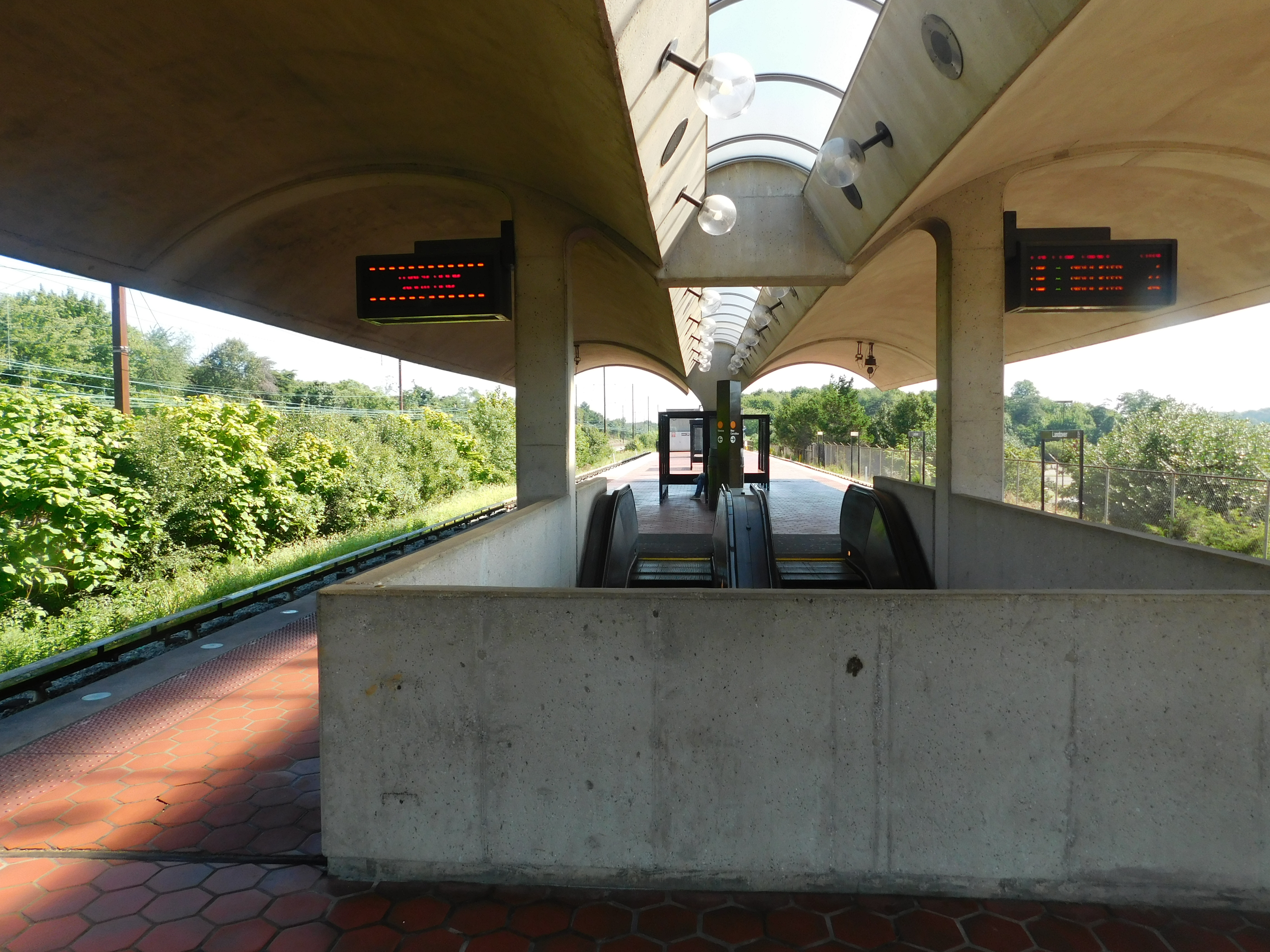
Landover station on the Orange Line of the Washington Metro, pictured in August 2018, located off MD 202

Landover is one of the few regions in the Washington, D.C. area that is served directly by multiple separate Washington Metro rail lines. Landover is served by the Orange, Blue, and Silver lines (many DC area suburbs are not served directly by Metrorail at all). The Landover Metro station serves the northern portion of Landover on the Orange Line. This station is also the primary metro station that serves the Landover area. The Morgan Boulevard Metro station, constructed in 2004, serves the southern portion of Landover on the Blue and Silver Lines and is the main rail terminus providing access to Commanders Field, which is home to the Washington Commanders in addition to many other sporting and entertainment events. Landover also has a special Metrobus Division also houses many Metrobuses that serve routes in Prince George's County, Maryland.

In addition to the Landover and Morgan Boulevard Metro Stations that primarily serve the Landover area, Landover residents have access to other metro stations nearby, such as New Carrollton, Cheverly, Largo, and Addison Road-Seat Pleasant.

I-495/95, the Capital Beltway, crosses U.S. Route 50 in Landover. The Beltway also has junctions with Maryland Route 202 (Landover Road) and Brightseat Road, which leads directly to FedExField.

=== Shopping ===
Landover was the home of Landover Mall, owned and operated by Lerner Enterprises. Built in 1972, it was the first enclosed mall in the Washington, D.C. metropolitan area to house four high-end retail anchor stores: Garfinkel's, Hecht's (owned by the May company), Woodward and Lothrop (popularly known as Woodies), and Sears. The mall also housed a multiplex movie theater located in the basement of the northeast corridor of the building. Located at the Capital Beltway and Landover Road, the mall neighbored the towns of Palmer Park, Ardmore, Glenarden, and Largo. Palmer Park was the hometown of Olympic boxing champion Sugar Ray Leonard. Garfinkel's closed in 1990, Woodies closed in 1995 and was replaced with a J.C. Penney store that lasted from 1996 to 2001, and Hecht's closed in 2002 with the opening of the Bowie Town Center located in Bowie. The entire mall officially closed in 2003 and was demolished in 2006, with the exception of Sears. Sears closed in 2014 and was later demolished.

With the arrival in 1997 of FedExField, the mall's parking lot is used for overflow parking. In 2007, according to The Washington Post, Prince George's County officials were in the midst of developing plans to transform the area where Landover Mall once stood. County officials propose to build luxury townhouses, trendy stores, and office buildings. The goal of the project is to transform the area into a residential and cultural hub that replicates the Bowie Town Center, and The Boulevard at the Capital Centre; the latter is in Lake Arbor CDP and has a Largo postal address.

== Parks and recreation ==
The Prince George's County Department of Parks and Recreation operates the Kentland Community Center and the Palmer Park Community Center.
