= Jamree Kromah =

American football player (born 2000)

No. 61 – Cleveland Browns
- Position: Defensive end
- Roster status: Active

Personal information
- Born: June 14, 2000 (age 26); Houston, Texas, U.S.
- Listed height: 6 ft 3 in (1.91 m)
- Listed weight: 268 lb (122 kg)

Career information
- High school: Charles Herbert Flowers (Springdale, Maryland)
- College: Rutgers (2018–2021); James Madison (2022–2023)
- NFL draft: 2024: undrafted

Career history
- Chicago Bears (2024)*; New England Patriots (2024); Chicago Bears (2024–2026); Miami Dolphins (2026); Cleveland Browns (2026–present)
- * Offseason or practice squad member only

Career NFL statistics as of Week 10, 2026
- Total tackles: 3
- Stats at Pro Football Reference

Jamree Kromah (born June 14, 2000) is an American professional football defensive end for the Cleveland Browns of the National Football League (NFL). He played college football for the Rutgers Scarlet Knights and James Madison Dukes.

== Early life ==
Kromah grew up in Glenarden, Maryland and attended Charles Herbert Flowers High School. Coming out of high school, Kromah initially decided to commit to play college football for the Old Dominion Monarchs but would de-commit. Kromah later flipped his commitment to play for the Rutgers Scarlet Knights.

== College career ==
=== Rutgers ===
During the 2019 season, Kromah notched seven tackles with half a tackle being for a loss, and half a sack. During the 2020 season, Kromah appeared in two games but did not record any statistics. In the 2021 season, Kromah played in 11 games making ten tackles with one and a half being for a loss. After the conclusion of the 2021 season, Kromah decided to enter his name into the NCAA transfer portal.

=== James Madison ===
In Kromah's first season with the Dukes in 2022, he totaled 21 tackles with five and a half being for a loss, and three and a half sacks. In week two of the 2023 season, Kromah tallied three tackles for a loss, and two sacks in a win over Virginia. Kromah finished the 2023 season tallying 60 tackles with 20.5 being for a loss, 11 sacks, a forced fumble, and a fumble recovery.

== Professional career ==
Pre-draft measurables
Height	Weight	Arm length	Hand span	Wingspan	40-yard dash	10-yard split	20-yard split	20-yard shuttle	Three-cone drill	Vertical jump	Broad jump
6 ft 3 1/2 in (1.92 m)	274 lb (124 kg)	35 1/4 in (0.90 m)	9 3/4 in (0.25 m)	6 ft 10 3/4 in (2.10 m)	4.80 s	1.60 s	2.75 s	4.63 s	7.34 s	31.0 in (0.79 m)	10 ft 0 in (3.05 m)
All values from Pro Day

=== Chicago Bears (first stint) ===
Kromah signed with the Chicago Bears as an undrafted free agent on May 9, 2024. He was also selected by the San Antonio Brahmas in the fifth round of the 2024 UFL draft on July 17. He was waived on August 27, and re-signed to the practice squad.

=== New England Patriots ===
On September 18, 2024, Kromah was signed to the New England Patriots' active roster. On October 8, Kromah was waived by New England.

=== Chicago Bears (second stint) ===
On October 15, 2024, Kromah signed with the Chicago Bears' practice squad. He signed a reserve/future contract with Chicago on January 6, 2025.

On August 26, 2025, Kromah was waived by the Bears as part of final roster cuts; he was re-signed to the team's practice squad the following day. He signed a reserve/future contract with the Bears on January 27, 2026.

On August 30, 2026, Kromah was named as part of the Bears' 53-man roster. He was waived on October 29 after the Bears traded for defensive tackle Jeffery Simmons.

=== Miami Dolphins ===
On October 30, 2026, Kromah was claimed off waivers by the Miami Dolphins. He was waived on November 16.

=== Cleveland Browns ===
On November 17, 2026, Kromah was claimed off waivers by the Cleveland Browns.
