= Wayne Matthews (American football) =

American football player (born 1998)

Wayne Matthews III
No. 35 – Chicago Bears
- Position: Linebacker
- Roster status: Practice squad

Personal information
- Born: July 10, 2002 (age 24); Largo, Maryland, U.S.
- Listed height: 6 ft 0 in (1.83 m)
- Listed weight: 221 lb (100 kg)

Career information
- High school: Flowers (Springdale, Maryland)
- College: Old Dominion (2021-2023); Michigan State (2024–2025)
- NFL draft: 2026: undrafted

Career history
- Chicago Bears (2026–present)*
- * Offseason or practice squad member only

Awards and highlights
- Third-team All-Sun Belt (2023)
- Stats at Pro Football Reference

Wayne Eugene Matthews III (born July 10, 2002) is an American professional football linebacker for the Chicago Bears of the National Football League (NFL). He played college football for the Michigan State Spartans and Old Dominion Monarchs.

== Early life ==
Matthews attended Charles Herbert Flowers High School. As a junior, he notched 79 tackles with eight being for a loss, and three sacks. Coming out of high school, Matthews was rated as a three-star recruit and committed to play college football for the Old Dominion Monarchs.

== College career ==
=== Old Dominion ===
As a freshman in 2021, Matthews played in three games where he recorded no statistics, using the season to redshirt. In 2022, he played in ten games, notching 13 tackles and a forced fumble. During the 2023 season, Matthews tallied 135 tackles with nine and a half being for a loss, three and a half sacks, three pass deflections, and three forced fumbles, earning third-team all-Sun Belt Conference honors. After the season, Matthews entered the NCAA transfer portal.

=== Michigan State ===
Matthews transferred to play for the Michigan State Spartans.

== Professional career ==
Pre-draft measurables
Height	Weight	Arm length	Hand span	Wingspan	40-yard dash	10-yard split	20-yard split	20-yard shuttle	Three-cone drill	Vertical jump	Broad jump	Bench press
5 ft 11 5/8 in (1.82 m)	230 lb (104 kg)	31 3/4 in (0.81 m)	10 in (0.25 m)	6 ft 5 1/2 in (1.97 m)	4.85 s	1.62 s	2.82 s	4.27 s	7.20 s	32.5 in (0.83 m)	9 ft 6 in (2.90 m)	20 reps
All values from Pro Day

Matthews signed with the Chicago Bears as an undrafted free agent on May 11, 2026. Matthews was waived by the Bears as a part of final roster cuts on August 30; he was re-signed to the team's practice squad the following day.
