= Palmer Park, Maryland =

Unincorporated community in Maryland, United States

- Unincorporated community
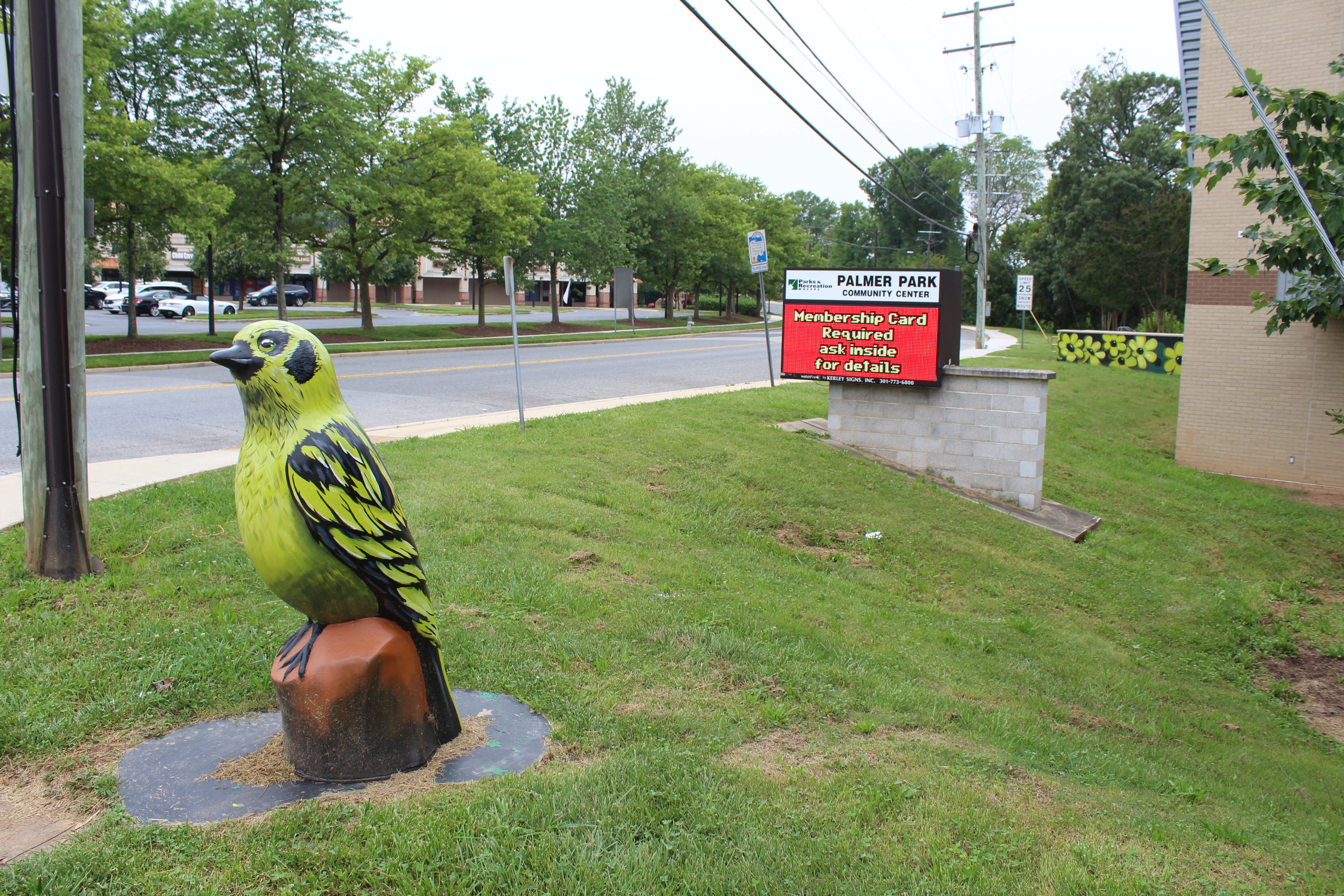
- Outside the Palmer Park Community Center

- Location within the state of Maryland Palmer Park (the United States)
- Coordinates: 38°55′15″N 76°52′18″W
- Country: United States
- State: Maryland
- County: Prince George's
- Time zone: UTC−5 (Eastern (EST))
  - Summer (DST): UTC−4 (EDT)
- GNIS feature ID: 597865

Palmer Park is an unincorporated community in Prince George's County, Maryland, United States, within the census-designated place of Landover. It was previously a CDP of its own until 2000.

== History ==
Palmer Park was adjacent to Wilson Dairy Farm. FedEx Field is now located on what used to be the farm from the 1750s to the 1990s. Palmer Park was an enclave of post-World War II triplex housing units designed as starter homes for young low-income families (less than $13K). It is surrounded by three parks.

It was predominantly white (99%) until segregation ended and blockbusting began in the 1960s. Within approximately two years, the community went from predominantly white to predominantly black. A lawsuit was filed for blockbusting and was won by the former residents in the late 1960s. Despite its colorful history, it has been home to successful politicians, athletes, and artists.

The former CDPs of Landover, Dodge Park, Kentland, and Palmer Park, defined as such by the U.S. Census Bureau in the 1990 U.S. census, were consolidated into the Greater Landover CDP as of the 2000 U.S. census. This amalgamated area was renamed the Landover CDP as of the 2010 U.S. census.

== Government and infrastructure ==
Palmer Park is home to the Palmer Park Senior Housing.

It is also home to Prince George's County Police Headquarters, which also serves as the District III station.

It is located right across from Prince George's Sports and Learning Complex and FedExField, home of the three-time Super Bowl champion Washington Commanders.

Right at the heart of Palmer Park are small stores that include a mini mart, gas station, hair salon, Boys and Girls Club offices, and a doctor's office. In addition to the stores, Palmer Park Community Center is located right across the street.

'Most of the first families settled in Palmer Park between 1956 and 1960.These were predominantly White families with young children. At that time there were 3 schools that served the area known as Landover. Palmer Park Elementary, Kent Jr. High (now a Police station) and Bladensburg High school in Bladensburg Maryland. Palmer Park offered a quiet and trusting environment as opposed to the Washington DC communities where most of the first families moved from. Organizations were created that served the children such as Cub Scout and Boy Scouts (Troop 739) Boy's Club sports for all ages and a baseball field in the center of the community. There was a Shopping Center with a People's drug store, Pizza place, Dry cleaners, Liquor store, and other small stores. A store bus would stop and go up and down all of the streets about 3pm every day and offer groceries that were not close by otherwise. This was Palmer Park in the beginning.

William Paca and Highland Park elementary schools serve sections of the former 1990 CDP. Kenmoor and G. James Gholson middle schools serve sections of the former 1990 CDP. The neighborhood high schools serving sections of Palmer Park are DuVal, Flowers, and Fairmont Heights.

== Transportation ==
Palmer Park is served by the Washington Metro Landover station (orange line), which is northwest of Palmer Park across Landover Road.

== Notable people ==
Comedian Martin Lawrence once lived in Palmer Park while attending Eleanor Roosevelt High School in nearby Greenbelt. Palmer Park was the hometown of 1976 Olympics gold medal winning boxer Sugar Ray Leonard. Rapper Rico Nasty lived in Palmer Park as a child.

== Parks and recreation ==
The Prince George's County Department of Parks and Recreation operates the Palmer Park Community Center.

The community is home to the Palmer Park Tigers, and holds an annual Palmer Park day in order to promote community spirit.

Historical population
Census	Pop.	Note	%±
1970	8,172		—
1980	7,986		−2.3%
1990	7,019		−12.1%

== See also ==
- Seat Pleasant, Maryland
