= Beall's Pleasure =

Historic house in Maryland, US

- U.S. National Register of Historic Places
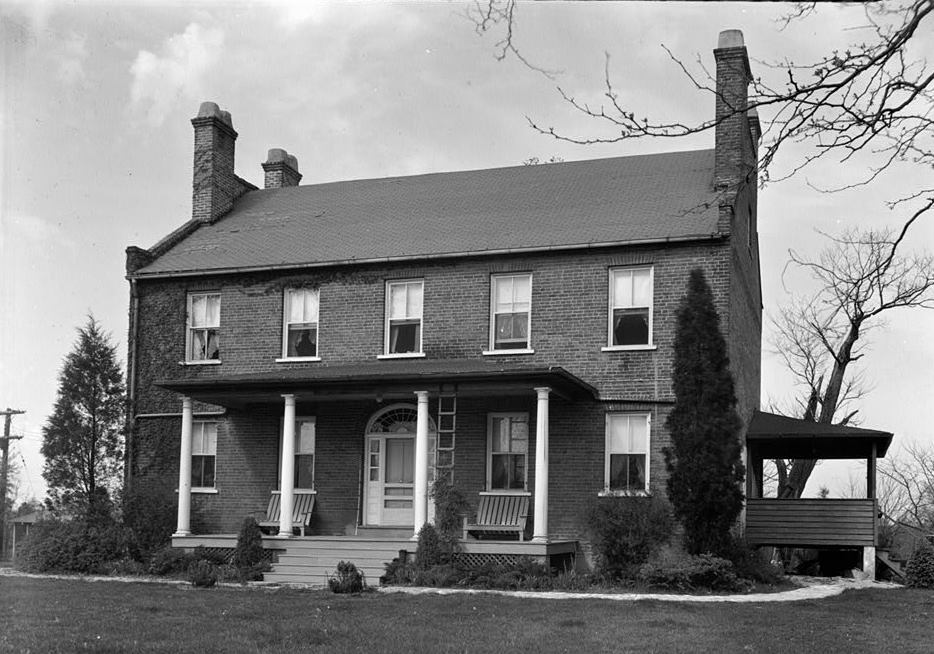
- Bealls Pleasure, 1936 HABS Photo

- Location within Maryland Location within the United States
- Location: 7250 Old Landover Road, Landover, Maryland
- Coordinates: 38°55′51″N 76°53′10″W
- Built: 1795; 1936
- Architectural style: Federal
- NRHP reference No.: 79003169
- Added to NRHP: May 4, 1979

Beall's Pleasure is a historic home located in Landover, Prince George's County, Maryland, United States. The original owner of the land was Colonel Ninian Beall. He helped establish the first Presbyterian Church in Prince George's County. It was built in 1795 as the summer home of Benjamin Stoddert who later became the first Secretary of the Navy.

The building is a 2-story Federal brick house with a 1 1/2-story brick wing added in 1936. The building is 5 bays wide in the front and 3 at the rear. The brick has been laid in common bond.

The garden was landscaped in 1936, by Boris V. Timchenko, long-time chief architect of the annual National Capital Flower and Garden Show, and later designer of gardens for President John F. Kennedy and Mrs. Mamie Eisenhower.

Beall's Pleasure was listed on the National Register of Historic Places in 1979.
