= Chillum Road Line =

Bus route in Washington

F1
- Chillum Road Line

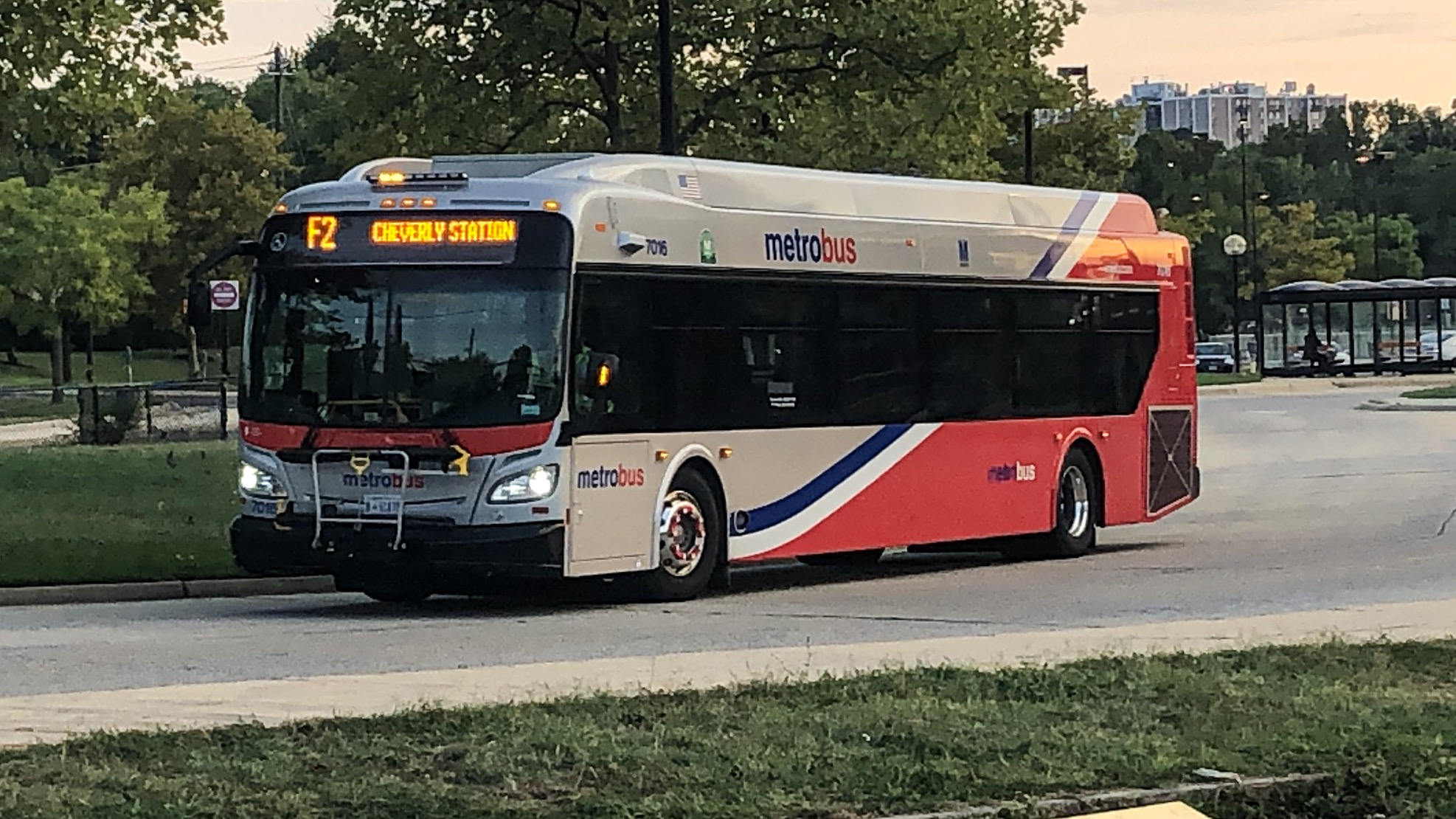
- Former F2 at West Hyattsville station

Overview
- System: Metrobus
- Operator: Washington Metropolitan Area Transit Authority
- Garage: Landover
- Livery: Local
- Status: Discontinued
- Began service: 1950s
- Ended service: June 29, 2025

Route
- Locale: Prince George's County, Montgomery County, Northeast, Northwest
- Communities served: Cheverly, Bladensburg, Colmar Manor, Cottage City, Brentwood, Mount Rainier, Hyattsville, Avondale, Chillum, Takoma Park, Takoma
- Landmarks served: Cheverly station, Prince George's Hospital, Peace Cross, Mount Rainier Terminal, West Hyattsville station, Takoma station
- Start: Cheverly station
- Via: Chillum Road, Adelphi Road, Queens Chapel Road, Annapolis Road, Landover Road, Eastern Avenue
- End: Takoma station

Service
- Level: Daily
- Frequency: 25-38 minutes (Rush Hour); 60 minutes (Midday and Weekday Evening Service); 58-62 minutes (Weekends)
- Operates: 5:25 AM – 9:45 PM (Weekdays); 5:32 AM – 7:36 PM (Saturday); 7:25 AM – 7:30 PM (Sunday)
- Ridership: 336,901 (FY 2024)
- Transfers: SmarTrip only
- Timetable: Chillum Road Line

The Chillum Road Line, designated as Route F1 was a daily bus route operated by the Washington Metropolitan Area Transit Authority between Cheverly station of the Silver and Orange Lines of the Washington Metro and Takoma station of the Red Line. The line operated every 25–38 minutes during peak hours, 60 minutes during weekday off peak hours, and 58–62 minutes on the weekends. Trips roughly took 50–60 minutes. The line was combined with the T14 and renamed Route P42 during WMATA's Better Bus Redesign on June 29, 2025.

== Background ==
Route F1 operated daily service between Cheverly station and Takoma station via Chillum Road, Queens Chapel Road, Eastern Avenue, Bladensburg Road, Annapolis Road, Landover Road, Hospital Drive, and Tuxedo Road.

Route F1 operated out of Landover division.

== History ==
The Chillum Road Line was simply derived off its predecessor route known as the K6 New Hampshire Avenue–Suburban Line, which began operation in the 1940s as a Capital Transit Company bus route, and operated via New Hampshire Avenue between White Oak and the intersection of New Hampshire Avenue & Eastern Avenue NE in Chillum, Maryland.

During the 1950s, the K6 was converted into a DC Transit Route, renamed as the, New Hampshire Avenue-Chillum Road Line and was extended from its terminus at the intersection of New Hampshire Avenue & Eastern Avenue N.E. in Chillum, Maryland to the intersection of 34th Street & Rhode Island Avenue in Mount Rainier, Maryland, via Eastern Avenue NE, Chillum Road, 19th Avenue, La Salle Road, Carson Circle, Queens Chapel Road, 25th Street, Arundel Road, Russell Avenue, 28th Place, Upshur Street, Rainier Avenue, 34th Street, Eastern Avenue NE, Rhode Island Avenue, and 34th Street.

In 1966, the K6 was rerouted to operate on the New Hampshire Avenue corridor south of the intersection of Eastern Avenue NE towards Federal Triangle alongside the K4 and K9 DC Transit Bus Routes. During this exact time, K6's routing between Mount Rainier and Chillum was replaced by DC Transit's East Riverdale - Cheverly Line Routes B4, B6, and B8 were extended from their original terminus at Mount Rainier to Chillum. B6 was discontinued in 1969. Then, eventually during the early 1970's when DC Transit's East Riverdale - Cheverly Line Routes B4 and B8 were discontinued, B2 was extended from its original terminus at Mount Rainier, to Chillum in order to replace their routing between Mount Rainier and Chillum.

On February 4, 1973, both B2 & K6 became Metrobus Routes when WMATA bought DC Transit, which was struggling financially and merged it with three other failing bus companies throughout the Washington D.C. Metropolitan Area, to form its own, "Metrobus" System.

On February 19, 1978, shortly after the Takoma station opened, B2 was truncated to only operate between Mount Rainier, Maryland and Anacostia. The segment of its routing between Mount Rainier and Chillum, was replaced by the F2 Metrobus Route and renamed the Chillum Road Line. F2 operated on the same exact routing as B2 between Mount Rainier and Chillum, only with the exception that it was extended to the Takoma station, via Eastern Avenue NE/NW, and Carroll Street NW. Prior to this time, F2 originally operated as part of the Michigan Avenue Line, alongside Route F4, between the intersection of 29th Street NE & Randolph Street NE (Mount Rainier) (F2)/ Eastern Avenue NE & Michigan Avenue NE (Avondale) (F4) and Archives in Downtown Washington D.C. It was initially a Capital Transit Company Bus Route in 1929, and then later on as a DC Transit Bus Route during the 1950s, well before becoming a WMATA Metrobus Route on February 4, 1973.

On December 3, 1978, route F2 was extended from its terminus at Mount Rainier Terminal, to the newly opened Cheverly station, in order to replace route 88's routing between Mount Rainier and Cheverly, Maryland, via Rhode Island Avenue, 38th Street/38th Avenue, Bladensburg Road, Annapolis Road, Landover Road, Prince George's Hospital, Cheverly Avenue, and Columbia Park Road.

On December 11, 1993, when West Hyattsville station opened, F2 was rerouted to operate on Queens Chapel Road north of 25th Street in Mount Rainier, then via Ager Road to serve the West Hyattsville Metro Station before returning back to Queens Chapel Road in the southbound direction via Ager Road. During this same exact time, F2 was rerouted to operate between Cheverly station and Prince George's Hospital, via Columbia Park Road, Arbor Street, Tuxedo Road, Kenilworth Avenue Service Roadway, Kenilworth Avenue, Lydell Road, Pepsi Place, Hospital Drive, Prince George's Hospital. Except for these route changes, F2's routing between the Cheverly and Takoma Metro Stations remained the same. F2's original routing between the Cheverly Metro Station and Prince George's Hospital was replaced by the F8 and F13 Metrobus Routes.

On January 24, 1999, a new route F1 was created to operate alongside the F2 between Takoma and Cheverly stations, only with the exception that it would operate between the intersections of Rhode Island Avenue and Arundel Road in Mount Rainier, Maryland, via Eastern Avenue NE and Varnum Street rather than operating via F2's routing via Eastern Avenue NE, 34th Street, Rainier Avenue, Upshur Street, 28th Place, and Russell Avenue. Route F1 would operate on weekdays and Route F2 would operate during early morning, late night, and weekends when TheBus Route 12 did not operate. F1 had a prior incarnation as the Avondale - Federal Triangle Express Line, which operated between Avondale and Federal Triangle as a DC Transit Route and eventually became a WMATA Metrobus Route on February 4, 1973, which ultimately got discontinued on February 19, 1978.

In 2012, WMATA proposed to reroute the F1 and F2 along Landover Road, Cooper Lane, and Annapolis Road on weekdays to replace Route F13. WMATA also proposed to reroute the F1 and F2 to Deanwood station to replace Route W4's portion between Prince George's Hospital and Deanwood station.

During the COVID-19 pandemic, route F1 was suspended beginning on March 16, 2020, while route F2 operated on its Saturday schedule. However beginning on March 18, 2020, the route was further reduced to operate on its regular Sunday schedule with the supplemental trips not operating and having weekend service suspended. Route F1 resumed service on August 23, 2020, and route F2 was reverted to its regular operating hours.

In February 2021 during WMATA's FY2022 Budget crisis, WMATA proposed to eliminate all Route F1 and F2 service beginning in January 2022. Subsequently on April 22, 2021, WMATA approved the FY2022 budget and received federal funding to avoid service cuts.

Due to rising cases of the COVID-19 Omicron variant, the line was reduced to its Saturday service on weekdays with Route F1 being suspended beginning on January 10, 2022. Full weekday service and all Route F1 service resumed on February 7, 2022.

On December 17, 2023, all Route F2 service was discontinued and replaced by Route F1, which added new weekend service. Also route F1 was rerouted to operate along Russell Avenue instead of 25th Avenue between Queens Chapel Road and Arundel Avenue in Avondale.

In 2024 during WMATA's FY2024 Budget crisis, WMATA proposed to eliminate all F1 service. However on April 25, 2024, Metro’s Board of Directors approved a $4.8 billion capital and operating budget which avoided service cuts.

=== Better Bus Redesign ===
In 2022, WMATA launched its Better Bus Redesign project, which aimed to redesign the entire Metrobus Network and is the first full redesign of the agency's bus network in its history.

In April 2023, WMATA launched its Draft Visionary Network. As part of the drafts, WMATA proposed to split the F1 and F2 into two segments.

Service between Cheverly station and the intersection of Annapolis Road & Baltimore Avenue via Arbor Street, Tuxedo Road, Kenilworth Avenue, Pepsi Place, Hospital Drive, Prince George's Hospital, Landover Road, Annapolis Road, and Bladensburg Road remained the same, but the route was combined with Routes F8 and R4 to Highview via Baltimore Avenue, Charles Armentrout Drive, Rhode Island Avenue, Jefferson Street, 42nd Avenue, Queensbury Road, Hyattsville Crossing station, East-West Highway, Toledo Terrace, Northwest Drive, Dean Drive, and Highview Terrace. The line was named Route MD344 in the proposals.

Service between Prince George's Hospital and Takoma station was also modified. The route would operate between Takoma station and Capitol Heights station via Martin Luther King Jr. Highway, Columbia Park Road, and Cheverly station, then would operate on the current Route F13 routing to Prince George's Hospital via Cheverly Avenue and Hospital Drive. Then the route would continue the F1/F2 routing to Takoma station via Annapolis Road, Bladensburg Road, 38th Street, Hamilton Street, West Hyattsville station, Queens Chapel Road, Chillum Road, Eastern Avenue, and Carroll Street. The line would be named Route MD342 in the proposals. Service along Eastern Avenue, Arundel Road, Rainier Avenue, and Upshur Street would be discontinued.

During WMATA's Revised Draft Visionary Network, WMATA renamed Route MD342 to Route P43 and changed to match the same routing as the current TheBus Route 18 route between Takoma Langley Crossroads Transit Center and Addison Road station via Kanawha Street, University Boulevard, 23rd Avenue, East-West Highway, Hyattsville Crossing station, Queens Chapel Road, Hamilton Street, 38th Street, Bladensburg Road, Annapolis Road, Cheverly Avenue, Cheverly station, Cheverly Avenue, Columbia Park Road, Martin Luther King Jr. Highway, and Addison Road. The route would not directly serve West Hyattsville station or Prince George's Hospital.

Route MD344 was merged with the proposed Route MD252 and was renamed to Route P42. The proposed Route P42 would operate on the proposed Route MD252 and the current Route T14 routing between New Carrollton station and the intersection of Bladensburg Road & 38th Avenue, via Ellin Road, 85th Avenue, Westbrook Drive, Lamont Drive, Good Luck Road, Auburn Avenue, Riverdale Road, Kenilworth Avenue, Edmonston Road, Annapolis Road, and Bladensburg Road, but then would continue on Bladensburg Road, then loop inside Fort Lincoln via Eastern Avenue NE, Fort Lincoln Drive NE, Market Street and Joshua Barney Drive. Then the route would continue onto Eastern Avenue NE before operating on the proposed Route MD344 and the current Route F1 routing to Takoma station via La Salle Road, Chillum Road, Eastern Avenue, and Carroll Street. All changes were then proposed during WMATA's 2025 Proposed Network.

On November 21, 2024, WMATA approved its Better Bus Redesign Network.

Beginning on June 29, 2025, Route F1 was combined with the T14 and was renamed to the P42. The F1 portion between Takoma and the intersection of La Salle Road & Queens Chapel Road remained the same, but the route was rerouted to operate on Eastern Avenue NE, loop around Fort Lincoln via Eastern Avenue NE, Fort Lincoln Drive NE, Market Street and Joshua Barney Drive, and follow the T14's routing between Mount Rainier and New Carrollton station. This also partially reincarnates the former Route B9 routing between Colmar Manor and Fort Lincoln. Service between West Hyattsville and Mount Rainier was replaced by Route C41, which was an extension of the former Route B2.
