= Carmody Hills-Pepper Mill Village, Maryland =

- former Former CDP
- Location of Carmody Hills-Pepper Mill Village, Maryland
- Coordinates: 38°53′43″N 76°53′24″W
- Country: United States
- State: Maryland
- County: Prince George's

Area
  - Total: 0.73 sq mi (1.9 km^{2})
  - Land: 0.73 sq mi (1.9 km^{2})
  - Water: 0 sq mi (0.0 km^{2})

Population (2000)
  - Total: 4,801
  - Density: 6,502/sq mi (2,510.4/km^{2})
- Time zone: UTC−5 (Eastern (EST))
  - Summer (DST): UTC−4 (EDT)
- FIPS code: 24-13312

Carmody Hills-Pepper Mill Village was a census-designated place (CDP) in Prince George's County, Maryland during the 2000 census. It consisted of two separate communities: Carmody Hills and Pepper Mill Village. For the 2010 census the area has been renamed as the Peppermill Village CDP.

== Geography ==
Carmody Hills-Pepper Mill Village was located at 38°53′43″N 76°53′24″W (38.895412, −76.890123).

According to the United States Census Bureau, the place had a total area of 0.7 square miles (1.8 km^{2}), all of it land.

== Demographics ==
Historical population
Census	Pop.	Note	%±
1970	6,245		—
1980	5,571		−10.8%
1990	4,815		−13.6%
2000	4,801		−0.3%

As of the census of 2000, there were 4,801 people, 1,578 households, and 1,256 families residing in the area. The population density was 6,501.9 inhabitants per square mile (2,510.4/km^{2}). There were 1,686 housing units at an average density of 2,283.3 per square mile (881.6/km^{2}). The racial makeup of the area was 1.46% White, 96.90% African American, 0.15% Native American, 0.15% Asian, 0.25% from other races, and 1.10% from two or more races. Hispanic or Latino of any race were 0.50% of the population.

There were 1,578 households, out of which 32.7% had children under the age of 18 living with them, 41.1% were married couples living together, 32.1% had a female householder with no husband present, and 20.4% were non-families. 16.9% of all households were made up of individuals, and 4.8% had someone living alone who was 65 years of age or older. The average household size was 3.03 and the average family size was 3.36.

In the area the population was spread out, with 29.4% under the age of 18, 7.6% from 18 to 24, 27.3% from 25 to 44, 25.5% from 45 to 64, and 10.2% who were 65 years of age or older. The median age was 35 years. For every 100 females, there were 88.0 males. For every 100 females age 18 and over, there were 81.2 males.

The median income for a household in the area was $49,068, and the median income for a family was $52,206. Males had a median income of $32,993 versus $35,357 for females. The per capita income for the area was $18,258. About 6.2% of families and 9.1% of the population were below the poverty line, including 15.2% of those under age 18 and 6.4% of those age 65 or over.
