= Greater Landover, Maryland =

- Former census-designated place
- Coordinates: 38°55′28″N 76°53′14″W
- Country: United States
- State: Maryland
- County: Prince George's

Area
  - Total: 4.1 sq mi (10.7 km^{2})
  - Land: 4.1 sq mi (10.7 km^{2})
  - Water: 0 sq mi (0.0 km^{2})

Population (2000)
  - Total: 22,900
  - Density: 5,561/sq mi (2,147.1/km^{2})
- Time zone: UTC−5 (Eastern (EST))
  - Summer (DST): UTC−4 (EDT)
- ZIP Code: 20784-85
- FIPS code: 24-34711

Greater Landover was a census-designated place (CDP) in Prince George's County, Maryland, during the 2000 United States census. The population was 22,900 at that time. As of 2007, the rough estimate given by the census was at 22,665. For the 2010 U.S. census, the area was designated the Landover CDP.

== Description ==
The former CDPs of Landover, Dodge Park, Kentland, and Palmer Park, defined as such by the U.S. Census Bureau in the 1990 U.S. census, were consolidated into the Greater Landover CDP as of the 2000 U.S. census. This amalgamated area was renamed the Landover CDP as of the 2010 U.S. census.

== Geography ==
Greater Landover was located at 38°55′28″N 76°53′14″W (38.924311, −76.887248).

According to the United States Census Bureau, the place had a total area of 4.1 square miles (11 km^{2}), all of it land.

== Demographics ==
As of the census of 2000, there were 22,900 people, 7,696 households, and 5,656 families residing in the area. The population density was 5,560.9 inhabitants per square mile (2,147.1/km^{2}). There were 8,600 housing units at an average density of 2,088.4 per square mile (806.3/km^{2}). The racial makeup of the area was 4.14% White, 92.03% African American, 0.20% Native American, 0.52% Asian, 0.04% Pacific Islander, 1.35% from other races, and 1.72% from two or more races. Hispanic or Latino of any race were 2.90% of the population.

There were 7,696 households, out of which 40.9% had children under the age of 18 living with them, 32.0% were married couples living together, 34.0% had a female householder with no husband present, and 26.5% were non-families. 20.4% of all households were made up of individuals, and 2.8% had someone living alone who was 65 years of age or older. The average household size was 2.97 and the average family size was 3.40.

In the area the population was spread out, with 33.3% under the age of 18, 9.9% from 18 to 24, 31.7% from 25 to 44, 20.0% from 45 to 64, and 5.2% who were 65 years of age or older. The median age was 30 years. For every 100 females, there were 85.8 males. For every 100 females age 18 and over, there were 78.4 males.

The median income for a household in the area was $37,730, and the median income for a family was $38,315. Males had a median income of $30,474 versus $30,083 for females. The per capita income for the area was $15,191. About 13.8% of families and 17.0% of the population were below the poverty line, including 22.4% of those under age 18 and 16.0% of those age 65 or over.
