= Tommy Akingbesote =

American football player (born 2003)

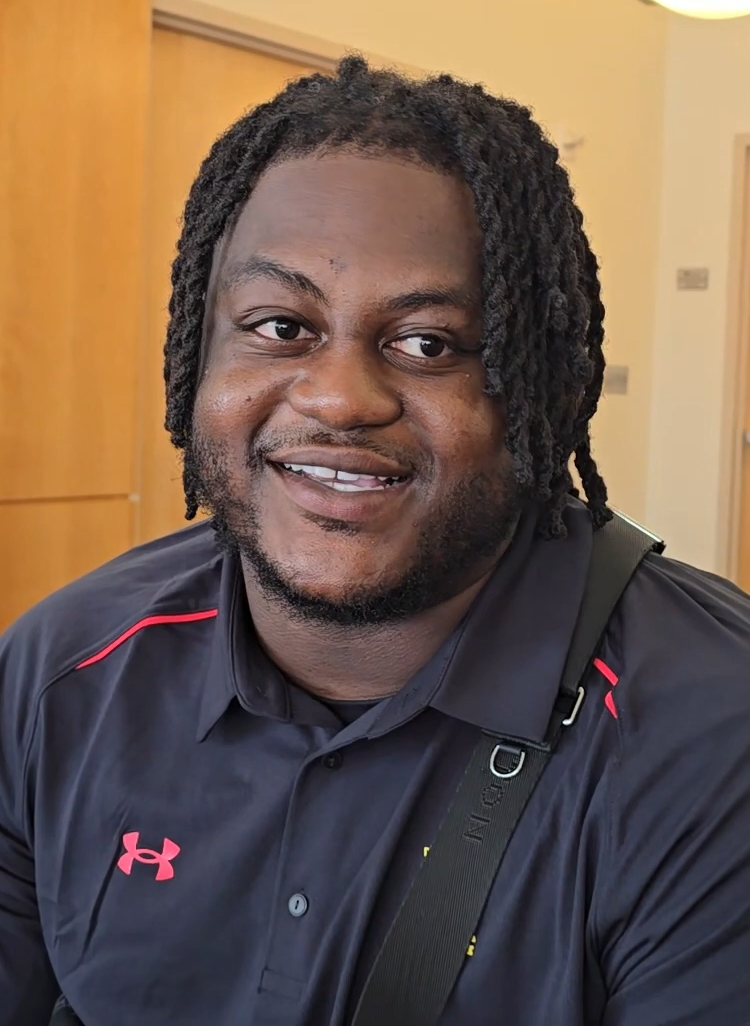
- Akingbesote with the Maryland Terrapins in 2024

Profile
- Position: Defensive tackle

Personal information
- Born: February 25, 2003 (age 23); Largo, Maryland, U.S.
- Listed height: 6 ft 4 in (1.93 m)
- Listed weight: 316 lb (143 kg)

Career information
- High school: Charles Herbert Flowers (Prince George's County, Maryland)
- College: Maryland (2021–2024)
- NFL draft: 2025: 7th round, 247th overall pick

Career history
- Dallas Cowboys (2025)*; Carolina Panthers (2025)*; Buffalo Bills (2025)*; Jacksonville Jaguars (2026)*
- * Offseason or practice squad member only
- Stats at Pro Football Reference

Olatunbosun "Tommy" Akingbesote (born February 25, 2003) is an American professional football defensive tackle. He played college football for the Maryland Terrapins and was selected by the Dallas Cowboys in the seventh round of the 2025 NFL draft.

== Early life ==
Akingbesote was born on February 25, 2003, and lived in District Heights, Maryland. He grew up playing basketball before switching to playing football as a junior at Charles Herbert Flowers High School as it gave him a better chance to receive a college scholarship.

He was ranked a four-star prospect as well as a top-20 defensive lineman nationally, and Akingbesote committed to play college football for the Maryland Terrapins.

== College career ==
Akingbesote enrolled at Maryland in June 2021. As a freshman that year, he appeared in seven games, totaling three solo tackles.

He appeared in 12 games, two as a starter, in 2022, posting 14 tackles and two sacks.

Akingbesote recorded 28 tackles, two passes defended, a sack and a blocked field goal during the 2023 season.

As a senior in 2024, he started all 12 games and was the leader among the team's defensive linemen with 32 tackles. He also recorded five tackles-for-loss (TFLs) and one sack. He competed at the 2025 East–West Shrine Bowl at the conclusion of his collegiate career.

He finished his tenure at Maryland having appeared in 44 games, recording 77 tackles, eight TFLs, four sacks and two passes defended.

== Professional career ==
Pre-draft measurables
Height	Weight	Arm length	Hand span	Wingspan	40-yard dash	10-yard split	20-yard split	20-yard shuttle	Vertical jump	Broad jump
6 ft 3 3/4 in (1.92 m)	306 lb (139 kg)	33 1/2 in (0.85 m)	10 in (0.25 m)	6 ft 10 5/8 in (2.10 m)	5.09 s	1.77 s	2.95 s	4.76 s	29.5 in (0.75 m)	8 ft 7 in (2.62 m)
All values from NFL Combine/Pro Day

=== Dallas Cowboys ===
Akingbesote was selected by the Dallas Cowboys in the seventh round (247th overall) of the 2025 NFL draft. He was waived on August 26 as part of final roster cuts.

=== Carolina Panthers ===
On September 8, 2025, Akingbesote was signed to the Carolina Panthers' practice squad. He was released by the Panthers on September 23.

=== Buffalo Bills ===
On October 28, 2025, Akingbesote signed with the Buffalo Bills' practice squad. On January 19, 2026, he signed a reserve/futures contract with Buffalo.

In 2026, Akingbesote attended training camp and played in the Bills’ preseason opener against the Carolina Panthers, but was released by the team three days later on August 18, 2026.

=== Jacksonville Jaguars ===
On August 23, 2026, Akingbesote signed with the Jacksonville Jaguars. On August 30, he was waived by Jacksonville as a part of final roster cuts.
