= Ridgley Methodist Episcopal Church =

Historic church in Maryland, United States

- U.S. National Register of Historic Places
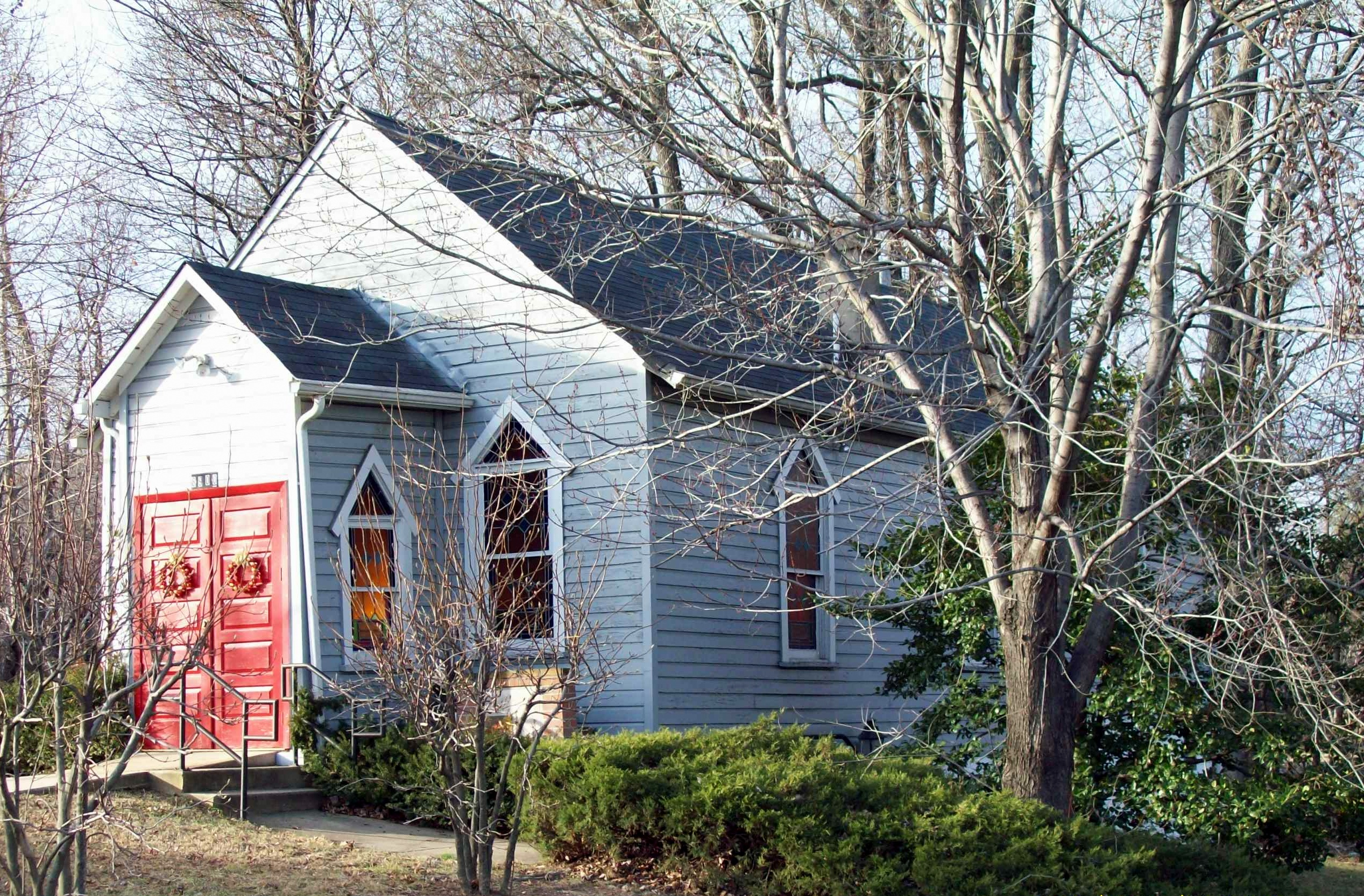
- Ridgley Methodist Episcopal Church, December 2008

- Location within Maryland Location within the United States
- Location: 8900 Central Ave., Landover, Maryland
- Coordinates: 38°53′35″N 76°51′9″W
- Area: 1.3 acres (0.53 ha)
- Built: 1921
- Architectural style: Late Gothic Revival
- MPS: African-American Historic Resources of Prince George's County, Maryland
- NRHP reference No.: 05000149
- Added to NRHP: March 14, 2005

Ridgley Methodist Episcopal Church, constructed in 1921, is a one-story frame church on the north side of Central Avenue in Landover, Prince George's County, Maryland. The church was founded in 1871 and a cemetery begun in 1892. It served as the spiritual and social center of the formerly rural African American farming community of Ridgley.

The gable-front church consists of a 1921 block on the south and a small 1940s extension on the north. The church was moved from its original location to its current location in 1990. In 2002, the church suffered a fire that destroyed the original plaster. The cemetery has about 20 mostly hand carved gravestones with flower and vine motif, arranged in orderly rows and grouped by families. The stones date from the 1910s to the 1940s. It is currently home to New Rock Church.

It was listed on the National Register of Historic Places in 2005.
