= Dodge Park, Maryland =

Unincorporated community in Maryland, U.S.

Coordinates: 38°55′39″N 76°52′37″W

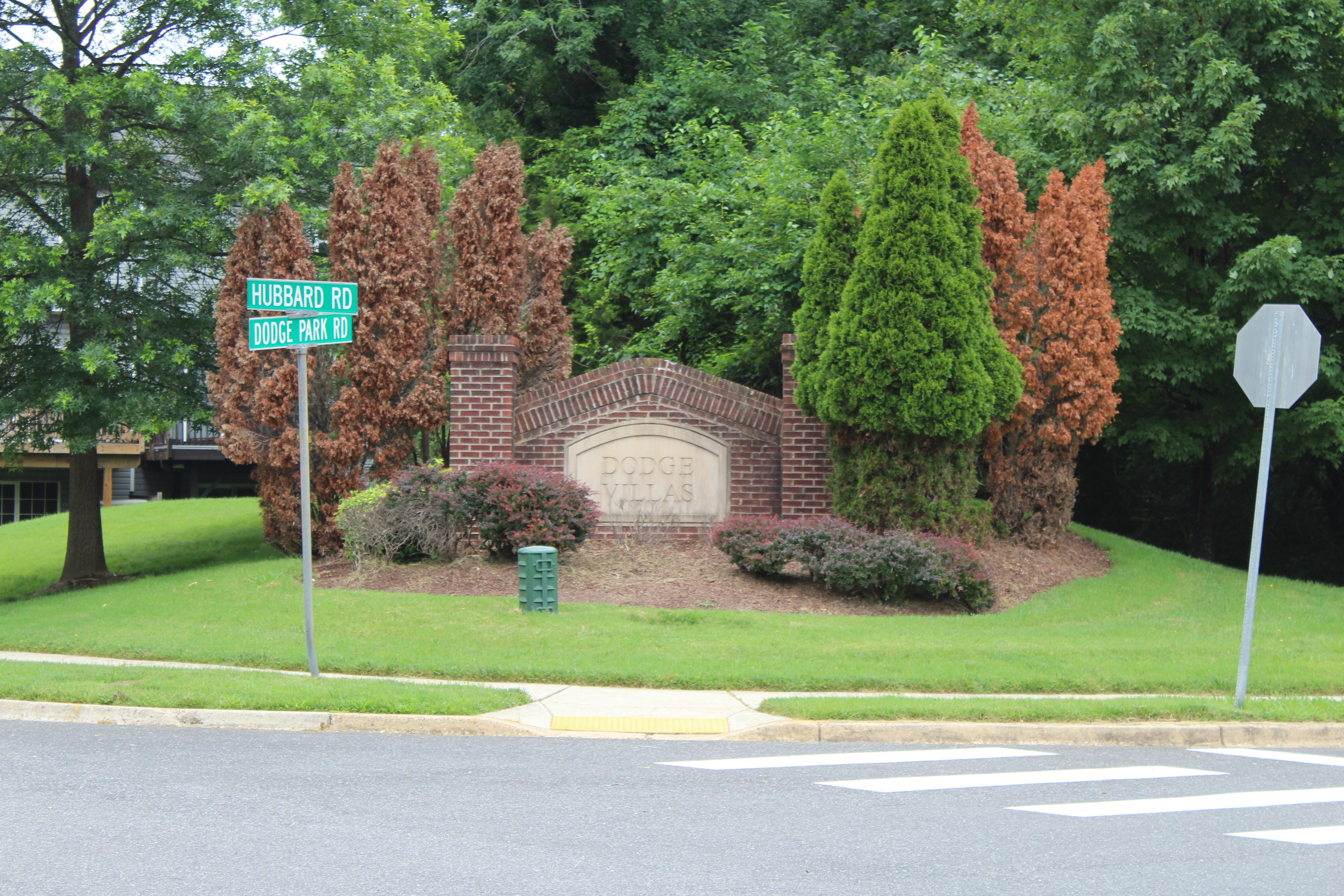
Sign for the Dodge Villas neighborhood

Dodge Park is an unincorporated area and former census-designated place (CDP) in Prince George's County, Maryland, United States; it is currently within the Landover CDP.

The former CDPs of Landover, Dodge Park, Kentland, and Palmer Park, defined as such by the United States Census Bureau in the 1990 United States census, were consolidated into the Greater Landover CDP as of the 2000 United States census. This amalgamated area was renamed the Landover CDP as of the 2010 United States census.

== Education ==
Prince George's County Public Schools operates area public schools.

Dodge Park and William Paca elementary schools serve sections of the former 1990 CDP. Kenmoor Middle School serves all of the former CDP DuVal High School and Charles Herbert Flowers High School serve sections of the former CDP.
