= Carmody Hills, Maryland =

Unincorporated community in Maryland, US

Carmody Hills
- Unincorporated community
- Location within the state of Maryland Carmody Hills (the United States)
- Coordinates: 38°53′47″N 76°53′42″W
- Country: United States of America
- State: Maryland
- County: Prince George's
- Time zone: UTC-5 (Eastern (EST))
  - Summer (DST): UTC-4 (EDT)
- GNIS feature ID: 597183

Carmody Hills is an unincorporated community in Prince George's County in the U.S. state of Maryland. Because it is not formally incorporated, it has no official boundaries, but the United States Census Bureau has defined a census-designated place consisting of Carmody Hills and the adjacent community of Pepper Mill Village, together designated "Peppermill Village", for statistical purposes. (At the 2000 census the area was delineated as "Carmody Hills-Pepper Mill Village".) Carmody Hills is located on the south side of Seat Pleasant Drive and east of Seat Pleasant.

== History ==
Carmody Hills, platted in the 1930s, is one of several subdivisions constructed in the early to mid 20th century around the Town of Seat Pleasant. Suburban development in this area of Prince George’s County began in the late 19th century and continued to grow throughout the 20th century due to its proximity to Washington and access to the city via railroads, streetcar lines, and road networks. The early 20th-century communities were fostered by the Chesapeake Beach Railway (1898) and the Washington, Baltimore and Annapolis Electric Railroad (1908). As the popular mode of transportation shifted from streetcar line to the automobile in the 1930s and 1940s, highways gave suburban residents access to the city. The George Palmer Highway (present-day Martin Luther King, Jr. Highway) was constructed on the right-of-way of the Washington, Baltimore and Annapolis Electric Railroad in the early 1940s.

The first development of the Carmody Hills subdivision began in the early 1930s. House construction and road development continued from the 1930s through the 1970s. By 1942, the community was well established with approximately 130 houses on a grid pattern of nine north-south streets and three east-west streets. In the immediate post-World War II period, vacant lots within the established residential blocks were developed. Between 1957 and 1965, the community expanded one block to the south and several blocks to the east. Also constructed within that time period was the Carmody Hills School. An evaluation of housing conditions in Carmody Hills in the late 1960s found approximately one-third of the houses in need of enhancement. Code enforcement, as well as street paving and drainage, encouraged the construction of new houses in the 1970s in areas of the community previously inaccessible.
