= Lake Arbor, Maryland =

- Census-designated place
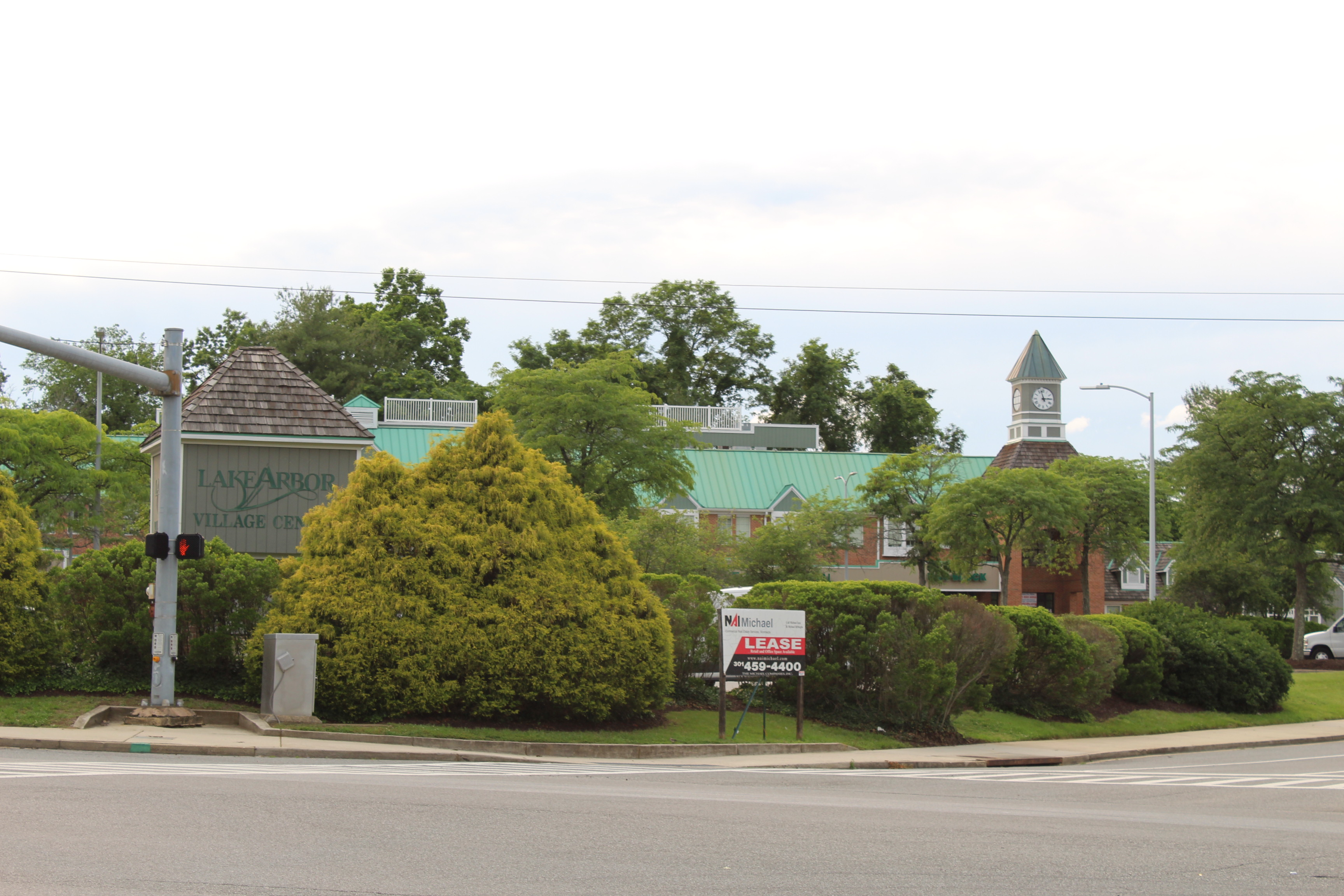
- Lake Arbor Village Center

- Coordinates: 38°54′30″N 76°49′46″W
- Country: United States
- State: Maryland
- County: Prince George's

Area
  - Total: 4.06 sq mi (10.52 km^{2})
  - Land: 4.00 sq mi (10.35 km^{2})
  - Water: 0.066 sq mi (0.17 km^{2})
- Elevation: 167 ft (51 m)

Population (2020)
  - Total: 14,541
  - Density: 3,640/sq mi (1,405/km^{2})
- Time zone: UTC−5 (Eastern (EST))
  - Summer (DST): UTC−4 (EDT)
- ZIP Code: 20721 & 20774
- FIPS code: 24-44817
- GNIS feature ID: 1852596

Lake Arbor is an unincorporated area and census-designated place (CDP) in Prince George's County, Maryland, United States. The population was 14,541 at the 2020 census. The ZIP Codes encompassing the CDP area are 20721 and 20774.

In the 1990s, the U.S. Census Bureau defined the area now delineated as Lake Arbor CDP as being in Mitchellville CDP. The Lake Arbor CDP was delineated as of the 2000 U.S. census.

== History ==
Lake Arbor was originally known as Newbridge, a development of Levitt & Sons, developers of the early planned communities of Levittown in Pennsylvania and Long Island, New York, respectively. When the project went bankrupt in the mid-1970s after selling only 41 houses, Manufacturer's Hanover Trust acquired the debt and held it as REO (real estate owned) for approximately 10 years until a limited partnership composed of David A. Gitlitz, Alvin Dworman, Phillip Abrahms, Phillip D. Winn, and Gary S. Lachman acquired it. Under the direction of Gitlitz, and with technical engineering assistance from Abrahms, Lachman changed the name of the property to Lake Arbor.

The story of Lake Arbor is emblematic of the socio-economic and demographic evolution of Prince George's County that occurred in the mid-1980s. Against the resistance of many large national builders who perceived Prince George’s County as a price-sensitive retreat for urban African Americans who they believed neither wanted nor could afford upscale amenities for their homes, community developers like Porten Sullivan, Pulte, Winchester, George T. Farrell of Morgan Investments and Jon Laria from Laria Builders built features like two-car garages, brick, fronts and elaborate landscaping and built 2000 luxury homes in this community in the 1980s, initiating a new path for the rest of Lake Arbor Community. Reynolds Real Estate acted as selling realtor and Industrial Bank of Washington provided construction and purchase financing. Buyers purchased these features, demonstrating the buying power of the predominantly African American market and codifying architectural standards requested (but not mandated) by county executives such as Winnie Kelly and Governor Parris Glendening. Lake Arbor established Prince George’s County as a destination for young, affluent African American families moving from Washington, DC for a suburban lifestyle.

== Geography ==
According to the United States Census Bureau, the CDP has a total area of 3.2 square miles (8.3 km^{2}), of which 3.1 square miles (8.0 km^{2}) is land and 0.1 square miles (0.26 km^{2}), or 1.58%, is water.

== Demographics ==
Historical population
Census	Pop.	Note	%±
2000	8,533		—
2010	9,776		14.6%
2020	14,541		48.7%
U.S. Decennial Census; 2010 2020

=== Racial and ethnic composition ===
Lake Arbor CDP, Maryland – Racial and ethnic composition Note: the US Census treats Hispanic/Latino as an ethnic category. This table excludes Latinos from the racial categories and assigns them to a separate category. Hispanics/Latinos may be of any race.
Race / Ethnicity (NH = Non-Hispanic)	Pop 2000	Pop 2010	Pop 2020	% 2000	% 2010	% 2020
White alone (NH)	591	198	762	6.93%	2.03%	5.24%
Black or African American alone (NH)	7,503	8,943	12,407	87.93%	91.48%	85.32%
Native American or Alaska Native alone (NH)	21	24	23	0.25%	0.25%	0.16%
Asian alone (NH)	145	195	311	1.70%	1.99%	2.14%
Native Hawaiian or Pacific Islander alone (NH)	2	2	2	0.02%	0.02%	0.01%
Other race alone (NH)	12	13	77	0.14%	0.13%	0.53%
Mixed race or Multiracial (NH)	119	161	455	1.39%	1.65%	3.13%
Hispanic or Latino (any race)	140	240	504	1.64%	2.45%	3.47%
Total	8,533	9,776	14,541	100.00%	100.00%	100.00%

=== 2020 census ===
As of the 2020 census, Lake Arbor had a population of 14,541. The median age was 42.7 years. 18.1% of residents were under the age of 18 and 17.8% of residents were 65 years of age or older. For every 100 females there were 76.6 males, and for every 100 females age 18 and over there were 70.8 males age 18 and over.

100.0% of residents lived in urban areas, while 0.0% lived in rural areas.

There were 5,971 households in Lake Arbor, of which 26.0% had children under the age of 18 living in them. Of all households, 31.9% were married-couple households, 17.4% were households with a male householder and no spouse or partner present, and 46.1% were households with a female householder and no spouse or partner present. About 38.0% of all households were made up of individuals and 9.8% had someone living alone who was 65 years of age or older.

There were 6,192 housing units, of which 3.6% were vacant. The homeowner vacancy rate was 1.0% and the rental vacancy rate was 5.4%.

=== 2000 census ===
As of the census of 2000, there were 8,533 people, 3,493 households, and 2,165 families residing in the CDP. The population density was 2,751.6 inhabitants per square mile (1,062.4/km^{2}). There were 3,662 housing units at an average density of 1,180.9 per square mile (455.9/km^{2}). The racial makeup of the CDP was 7.20% White, 88.74% African American, 0.28% Native American, 1.77% Asian, 0.02% Pacific Islander, 0.42% from other races, and 1.57% from two or more races. Hispanic or Latino of any race were 1.64% of the population.

There were 3,493 households, out of which 34.2% had children under the age of 18 living with them, 40.1% were married couples living together, 17.1% had a female householder with no husband present, and 38.0% were non-families. 32.7% of all households were made up of individuals, and 8.7% had someone living alone who was 65 years of age or older. The average household size was 2.42 and the average family size was 3.11.

In the CDP, the population was spread out, with 25.7% under the age of 18, 6.3% from 18 to 24, 36.9% from 25 to 44, 22.1% from 45 to 64, and 9.0% who were 65 years of age or older. The median age was 36 years. For every 100 females, there were 76.4 males. For every 100 females age 18 and over, there were 71.3 males.

The median income for a household in the CDP was $74,599, and the median income for a family was $89,775. Males had a median income of $52,617 versus $45,644 for females. The per capita income for the CDP was $35,700. About 0.6% of families and 1.9% of the population were below the poverty line, including 0.4% of those under age 18 and 9.2% of those age 65 or over.

== Economy ==
When it was in operation, The Boulevard at the Capital Centre was in Lake Arbor CDP.

When it existed, Crown Books had its headquarters in what is now Lake Arbor.

== Government ==
The U.S. Postal Service operates the Largo Post Office in Lake Arbor CDP, with a Largo postal address.

== Education ==
Prince George's County Public Schools serves Lake Arbor.

The zoned schools are Lake Arbor Elementary School, Ernest Everett Just Middle School, and Charles Herbert Flowers High School.

== Transportation ==
Washington Metro Downtown Largo station is in Lake Arbor CDP.
