= Kentland, Maryland =

Unincorporated community in Maryland, United States

Kentland-Kent Village
- Unincorporated community
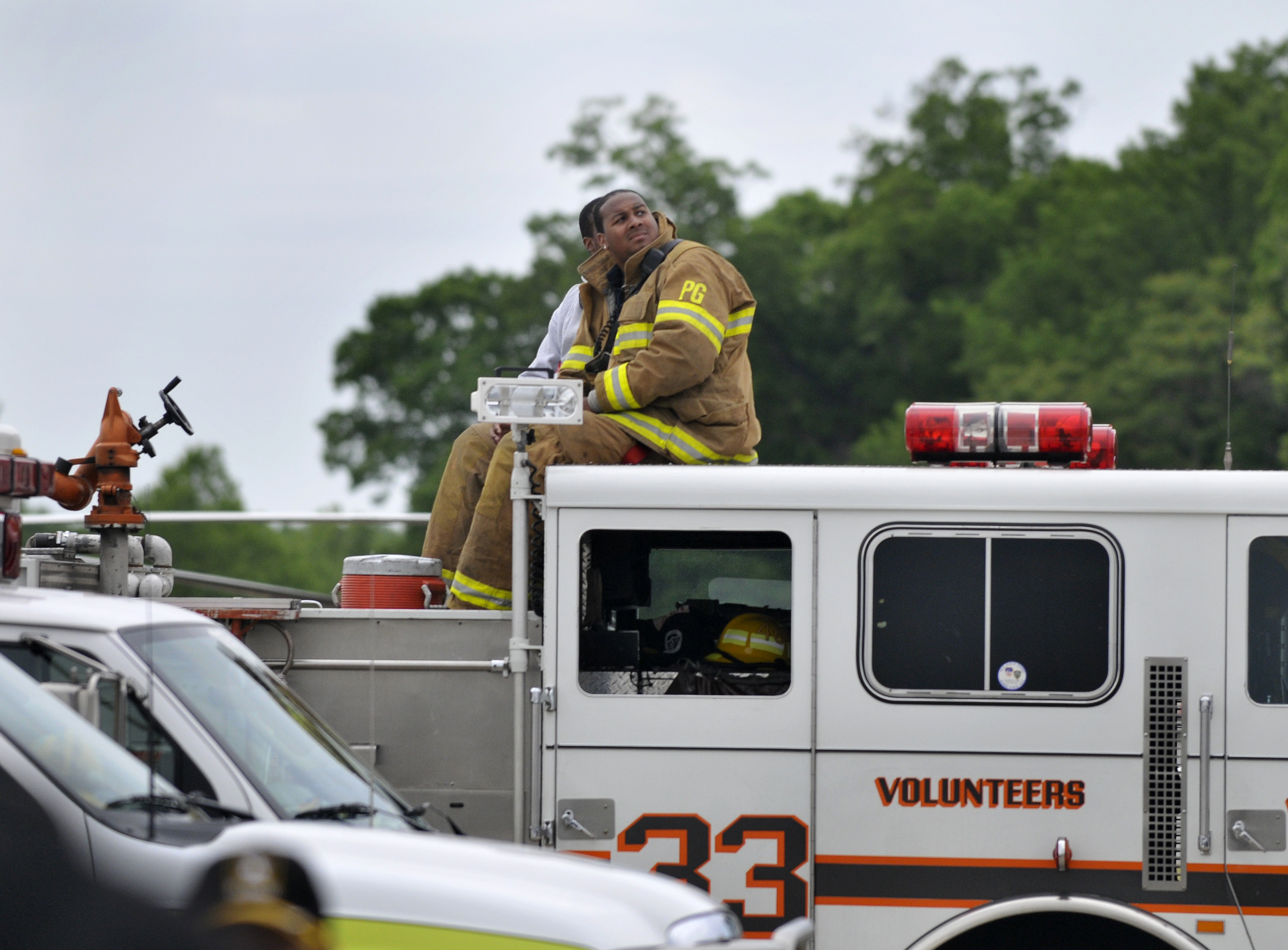
- Kentland Volunteer Fire Department Engine Company 33 in 2009.

- Location within the state of Maryland Kentland-Kent Village (the United States)
- Coordinates: 38°55′25″N 76°52′48″W
- Country: United States
- State: Maryland
- County: Prince George's
- Time zone: UTC−5 (Eastern (EST))
  - Summer (DST): UTC−4 (EDT)
- GNIS feature ID: 597635

Kentland (Kent Village) is an unincorporated community and former census-designated place in Prince George's County, Maryland, United States, located within the Landover census area. Kentland is served by the Landover Metro Station (orange line), which is located just north of the community, across Landover Road.

The former CDPs of Landover, Dodge Park, Kentland, and Palmer Park, defined as such by the U.S. Census Bureau in the 1990 U.S. census, were consolidated into the Greater Landover CDP as of the 2000 U.S. census. This amalgamated area was renamed the Landover CDP as of the 2010 U.S. census.

Historical population
Census	Pop.	Note	%±
1970	9,649		—
1980	8,596		−10.9%
1990	7,967		−7.3%

== Education ==
Prince George's County Public Schools operates area public schools.

Dodge Park and Columbia Park elementary schools serve sections of the former 1990 CDP. The zoned secondary schools are James Gholson Middle School and Fairmont Heights High School.

== Parks and recreation ==
The Prince George's County Department of Parks and Recreation operates the Kentland Community Center.
