= The Boulevard at the Capital Centre =

Defunct open-air shopping center in Prince George's County, Maryland

Coordinates: 38°54′9.4″N 76°50′46.9″W

Boulevard at the Capital Centre
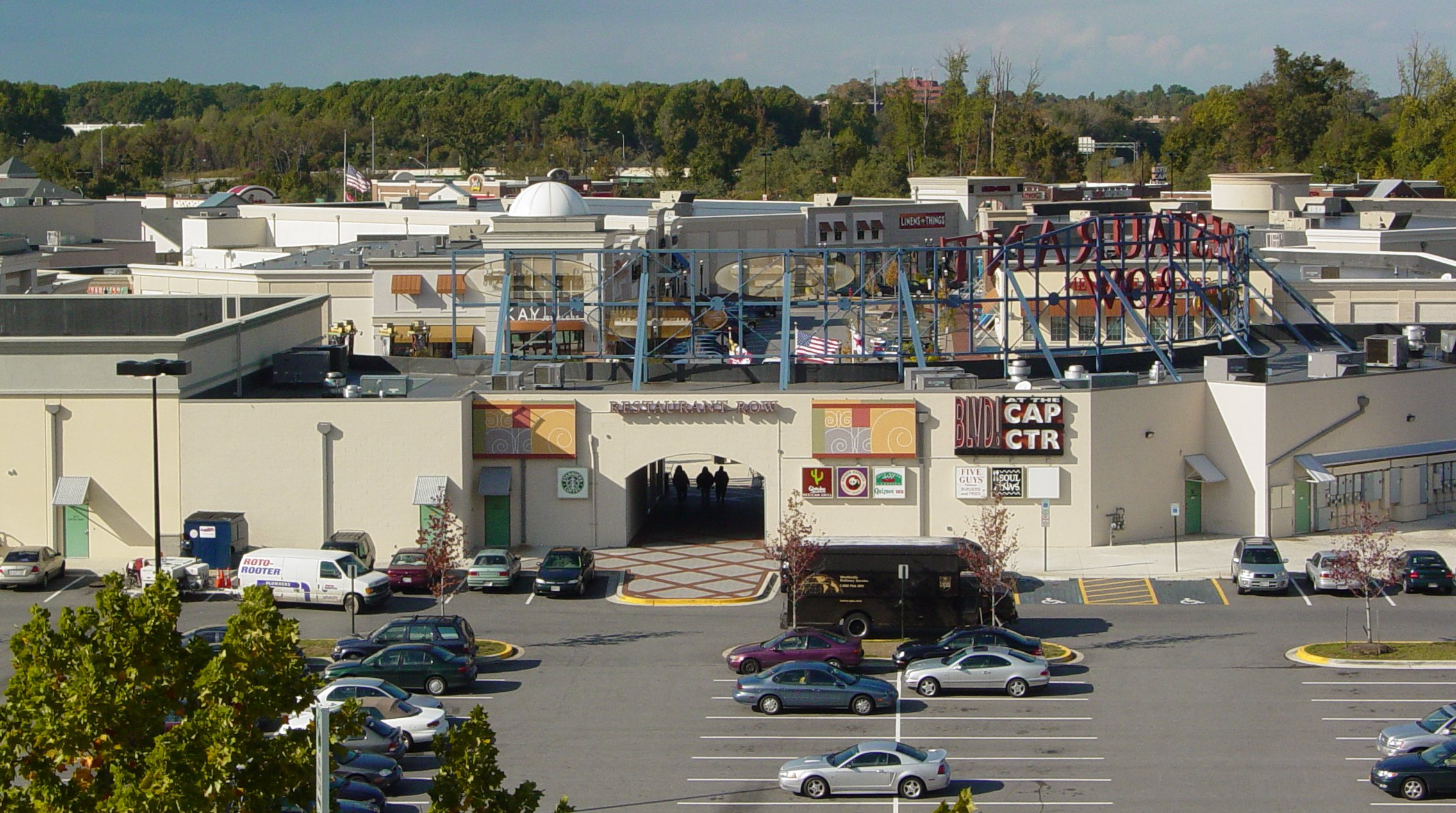
- Location: Lake Arbor, Maryland
- Opened: 2003
- Closed: November 2017
- Developer: The Cordish Companies
- Manager: Inland Management
- Num. of stores: 70
- Num. of anchor tenants: 4
- Floor area: 485,276 sq ft (45,083.6 m^{2})
- Floors: 1
- Public transit: Washington Metro: at Largo Town Center; TheBus: P44, P52, P56, P57, P5X, P64; Metrobus: P41, P72, P73
- Website: www.shopcapcentre.com (archived on October 7, 2016)

The Boulevard at the Capital Centre was an open-air shopping center in Lake Arbor, Prince George's County, Maryland; it had a Largo postal address. It was located on the former site of the Capital Centre, previously the home of the Washington Bullets and Washington Capitals.

Opened in 2003, the Boulevard at the Capital Centre was located next to the Largo Town Center Washington Metro station (the eastern terminus of the Blue and Silver lines). The facility had more than 70 establishments. It was formerly the home of short-lived chain restaurant Gladys Knight & Ron Winans' Chicken & Waffles.

Though it was envisioned as a middle-class destination when it opened, the mall soon began to struggle. Its more desirable retailers closed and were replaced with downscale offerings like T-shirt and cell phone shops; many vacancies also remained. It also experienced problems with crime: five people were killed at the mall between 2005 and 2009, and there were 101 car break-ins in 2008.

In November 2017, the shopping center closed to build the new University of Maryland Capital Region Medical Center. In addition there were to be new luxury apartments, restaurants, and a shopping center.

In July 2019, demolition of 290,000 square feet (27,000 m^{2}) of retail space commenced to make way for Carillon, a new lifestyle-oriented mixed-use development on the same site. The University of Maryland Capital Region Medical Center was completed and opened on June 8, 2021.

== Architecture ==
The Boulevard at the Capital Centre was designed as a Main Street-style retail complex comprising ten buildings. Its construction used tilt-up concrete panels, with raised wall sections creating the appearance of a second storey. The exterior finishes incorporated thin brick, painted PVC, architectural stone and decorative concrete detailing. The project also required special construction measures during winter, including ground heaters and soil cement.
