= Ardmore, Maryland =

Unincorporated community in Maryland, United States

Ardmore
- Unincorporated community
- Location within the state of Maryland Ardmore (the United States)
- Coordinates: 38°56′0″N 76°51′7″W
- Country: United States
- State: Maryland
- County: Prince George's
- Time zone: UTC−5 (Eastern (EST))
  - Summer (DST): UTC−4 (EDT)
- GNIS feature ID: 597014

Ardmore is an unincorporated community in Prince George's County, Maryland, United States.

Ardmore was the name given to the railroad depot in the opening sequences set in Maryland, of the 1956 movie Giant.
