= Charles Herbert Flowers High School =

Public high school in United States

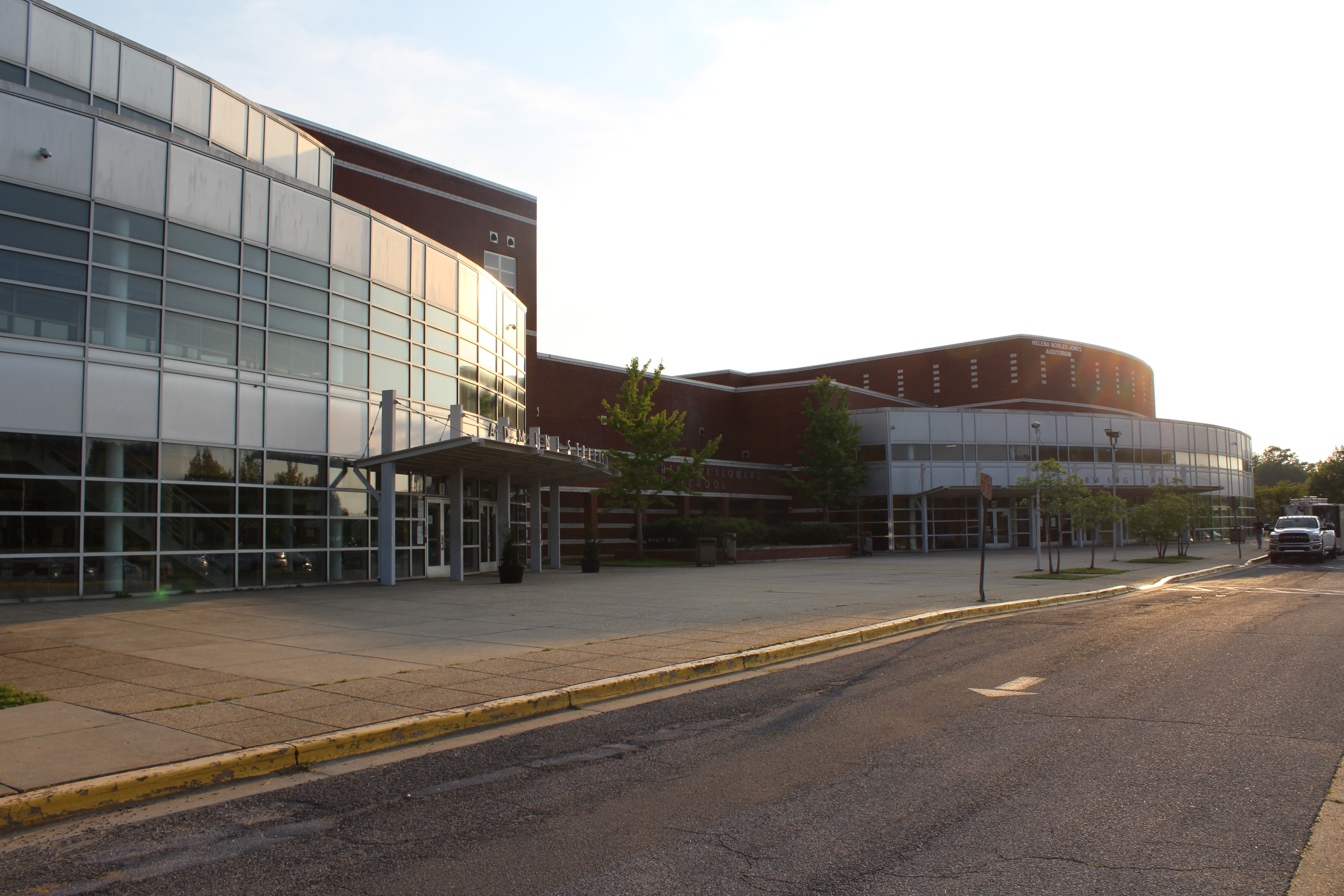

Location
- 10001 Ardwick Ardmore Road; Springdale, Maryland 20774; United States
- 38.932°N 76.835°W

Information
- Type: Public High School
- Motto: Mecca of Excellence/ Hustle Hard
- Established: 2000
- School district: Prince George's County Public Schools
- Principal: Gorman Brown
- Grades: 9–12
- Enrollment: 2,569 (2024)
- Colors: Green, black, silver
- Mascot: Jaguars
- Website: www.pgcps.org/charleshflowers

Charles Herbert Flowers High School is a comprehensive science and technology magnet school located in unincorporated Prince George's County, Maryland, United States, adjacent to the Springdale census-designated place and with a Springdale postal address. It is part of the Prince George's County School System. Its principal is Dr. Gorman Brown.

The school serves: most of the City of Glenarden, all of Lake Arbor CDP and Springdale CDP, portions of Landover CDP and Summerfield CDP, and most of the 2010-defined Mitchellville and Woodmore CDPs.

Flowers High School's motto is "Mecca of Excellence." The school's Alma Mater, "A Mecca of Excellence," was written by R&B singer and 2004 graduate Patrice Jones and principal Helena Jones.

== History ==
The school opened its doors in August 2000, for only 9th and 10th grade students. At that time, it was the first new high school in 26 years constructed in the Prince George's County Public School system. It cost $30 million. 1,000 were expected at its opening.

The provisional name was Ardmore High School until the final name was decided. The Prince George's County Board of Education considered several names for the school, but ultimately settled on long-time Glenarden resident Charles Herbert Flowers, a well-known trainer of the Tuskegee Airmen. In doing so, the school board waived its guideline for naming schools posthumously. Flowers appeared to celebrate the school's opening.

As the school was to open, residents in the wealthier areas of Lake Arbor and Mitchellville and the lower income Landover were competing over who would be served by the school; some wealthier African-Americans were reluctant to let their children go to school with poor children. In April 2000 the school board chose not to include Palmer Park students in the Flowers attendance zone, so they were instead assigned to DuVal High School. If Palmer Park was included, the estimate calculated was an additional 115 students, which would have made the occupancy 100.6%.

Flowers was ranked #1,445 on Newsweek's Top 1500 Public High Schools in America, for 2009.

== Campus ==
The building features a gymnasium, a wrestling room, a tennis court, a stadium and an auditorium with 750 seats, and 18 laboratories for science classes. In 2018 the school began using a classroom as a school supply area for new teachers in the district. Experienced teachers supply the "treasure room" with excess school supplies.

== School uniforms ==
School Emblem

Initially, students of Charles Herbert Flowers were not required to wear uniforms, although there was a dress code that students had to adhere to. In the fall of 2005, following a school-wide survey of parents and students, Flowers students were required to wear a school uniform that consisted of grey slacks or grey pleated skirts, white polo or oxford shirts consisting of the school logo, a hunter green blazer or v-neck sweater vest, and v-neck long-sleeve sweater, all bearing the school logo, as well as a black belt and black shoes.

The class of 2006 was the first senior class required to wear uniforms. The school uniform policy remains, but is no longer as strict. Students are no longer required to purchase their uniforms from the school, making the uniforms more affordable. Today, the uniforms for all students are black khakis with a forest green polo shirt, with any color shoes.

Beginning in the 2011–2012 school year, students in the Science and Technology Program, who have internships during the day, wear an all-black uniform. This uniform consists of a black top with the new Science and Technology logo and the word "INTERN" underneath, and black bottoms.

== Academics ==
Charles Herbert Flowers High School is part of the Prince George's County Science and Technology program. This program also includes Eleanor Roosevelt High School and Oxon Hill High School.

As of 2010 80% of its 12th grade students passed Maryland state achievement tests, and Flowers had an 82% graduation rate. In the previous year it met every adequate yearly progress (AYP) target set by the federal government.

Previously the school only allowed students already making a 3.0 grade point average and with permission from teachers to sign up for Advanced Placement (AP) courses. By that period most U.S. schools, which had previously restricted AP enrollment to high-achieving students, began to let all students sign up; in 2010 the school still restricted AP classes even though PGCPS policy stated that they must be open to all students. After Jay Mathews of The Washington Post inquired on the matter, principal Helena Nobles-Jones stated that the restriction policy had been dropped.

== Notable alumni ==
- Tommy Akingbesote (2021), defensive tackle for the Buffalo Bills
- Blac Chyna (2006), TV Personality and Socialite
- Omar Cuff (2004), former professional football player
- Christian Harrison (2011), Professional Track and Field Athlete
- Jamree Kromah (2018), defensive end for the Chicago Bears
- Jazz Lewis (2007), member of the Maryland House of Delegates
- Wayne Matthews III (2021), linebacker for the Chicago Bears
- Redveil (2022), rapper
- Rico Nasty (2015), rapper
- Xanman (2018), rapper

== School organizations ==
- Student Government Association
- Future Business Leaders of America
- National Art Honor Society
- Science National Honor Society
- National Chinese Honor Society
- Chinese Game Club
- National Honor Society
- Student Humanitarian Organization
- Air Force Junior Reserve Officer Training Corps
- Jaguar Players Drama Club
- Science and Technology Academic Reformers (STAR)
- It's Academic
- LGBTQ+ Club
- Pom & Dance Team
- Mock Trials Defence Team
- Environmental Science Club
- National Society of Black Engineers
- College Summit
- African Students' Association
- Young People for God Christian Club
- Muslim Students' Association
- Math Honor Society
- Mathematic Engineering and Science Achievement
- Spanish Honor Society
- Scholarship Club
- Poetry Club
- Community Day
- Flowers Kouture
- Inklings: Young Writers Club
- ProStart Culinary Arts Program
- Jaguar Debate Team
- Ten80 Education
- Computer Science Honor Society
