= Springdale, Maryland =

- Census-designated place
- Coordinates: 38°56′14″N 76°50′45″W
- Country: United States
- State: Maryland
- County: Prince George's

Area
  - Total: 1.34 sq mi (3.46 km^{2})
  - Land: 1.33 sq mi (3.45 km^{2})
  - Water: 0.0039 sq mi (0.01 km^{2})
- Elevation: 115 ft (35 m)

Population (2020)
  - Total: 5,301
  - Density: 3,983.0/sq mi (1,537.83/km^{2})
- Time zone: UTC−5 (Eastern (EST))
  - Summer (DST): UTC−4 (EDT)
- ZIP code: 20774
- Area codes: 301, 240
- FIPS code: 24-74282
- GNIS feature ID: 1852601

Springdale is an unincorporated area and census-designated place (CDP) in Prince George's County, Maryland, United States. Per the 2020 census, the population was 5,301.

== Geography ==
Springdale is located at 38°56′14″N 76°50′45″W (38.937244, −76.845734).

According to the United States Census Bureau, the CDP has a total area of 0.8 square miles (2.1 km^{2}), all land.

== Demographics ==
Historical population
Census	Pop.	Note	%±
2000	2,645		—
2010	2,994		13.2%
2020	5,301		77.1%
U.S. Decennial Census; 2010 2020

=== Racial and ethnic composition ===
Springdale CDP, Maryland – Racial and ethnic composition Note: the US Census treats Hispanic/Latino as an ethnic category. This table excludes Latinos from the racial categories and assigns them to a separate category. Hispanics/Latinos may be of any race.
Race / Ethnicity (NH = Non-Hispanic)	Pop 2000	Pop 2010	Pop 2020	% 2000	% 2010	% 2020
White alone (NH)	57	50	51	2.16%	1.67%	0.96%
Black or African American alone (NH)	2,432	2,697	4,315	91.95%	90.08%	81.40%
Native American or Alaska Native alone (NH)	7	6	8	0.26%	0.20%	0.15%
Asian alone (NH)	46	73	152	1.74%	2.44%	2.87%
Native Hawaiian or Pacific Islander alone (NH)	2	0	2	0.08%	0.00%	0.04%
Other race alone (NH)	10	9	26	0.38%	0.30%	0.49%
Mixed race or Multiracial (NH)	49	28	138	1.85%	0.94%	2.60%
Hispanic or Latino (any race)	42	131	609	1.59%	4.38%	11.49%
Total	2,645	2,994	5,301	100.00%	100.00%	100.00%

=== 2020 census ===
As of the 2020 census, Springdale had a population of 5,301. The median age was 40.3 years. 23.4% of residents were under the age of 18 and 15.7% of residents were 65 years of age or older. For every 100 females there were 87.8 males, and for every 100 females age 18 and over there were 85.6 males age 18 and over.

100.0% of residents lived in urban areas, while 0.0% lived in rural areas.

There were 1,587 households in Springdale, of which 38.2% had children under the age of 18 living in them. Of all households, 51.2% were married-couple households, 14.2% were households with a male householder and no spouse or partner present, and 31.1% were households with a female householder and no spouse or partner present. About 15.0% of all households were made up of individuals and 7.4% had someone living alone who was 65 years of age or older.

There were 1,634 housing units, of which 2.9% were vacant. The homeowner vacancy rate was 1.6% and the rental vacancy rate was 1.0%.

=== 2000 census ===
At the 2000 census there were 2,645 people, 836 households, and 699 families in the CDP. The population density was 3,215.6 inhabitants per square mile (1,241.6/km^{2}). There were 862 housing units at an average density of 1,047.9 per square mile (404.6/km^{2}). The racial makeup of the CDP was 2.72% White, 92.29% African American, 0.26% Native American, 1.74% Asian, 0.08% Pacific Islander, 0.83% from other races, and 2.08% from two or more races. Hispanic or Latino of any race were 1.59%.

Of the 836 households 44.4% had children under the age of 18 living with them, 63.5% were married couples living together, 15.7% had a female householder with no husband present, and 16.3% were non-families. 12.4% of households were one person and 2.5% were one person aged 65 or older. The average household size was 3.16 and the average family size was 3.40.

The age distribution was 30.9% under the age of 18, 6.4% from 18 to 24, 32.6% from 25 to 44, 24.4% from 45 to 64, and 5.7% 65 or older. The median age was 35 years. For every 100 females, there were 94.1 males. For every 100 females age 18 and over, there were 87.9 males.

The median household income was $82,341 and the median family income was $81,811. Males had a median income of $45,731 versus $42,326 for females. The per capita income for the CDP was $28,119. About 1.4% of families and 3.0% of the population were below the poverty line, including 5.6% of those under age 18 and none of those age 65 or over.

== Government ==
Prince George's County Police Department District 2 Station in Brock Hall CDP, with a Bowie postal address, serves the community.

== Education ==
Springdale is within the Prince George's County Public Schools. Zoned schools are Ardmore Elementary School, Ernest Everett Just Middle School, and Charles H. Flowers High School.
