= Cheverly station =

Washington Metro station

Coordinates: 38°54′59.6″N 76°55′0.7″W

Cheverly
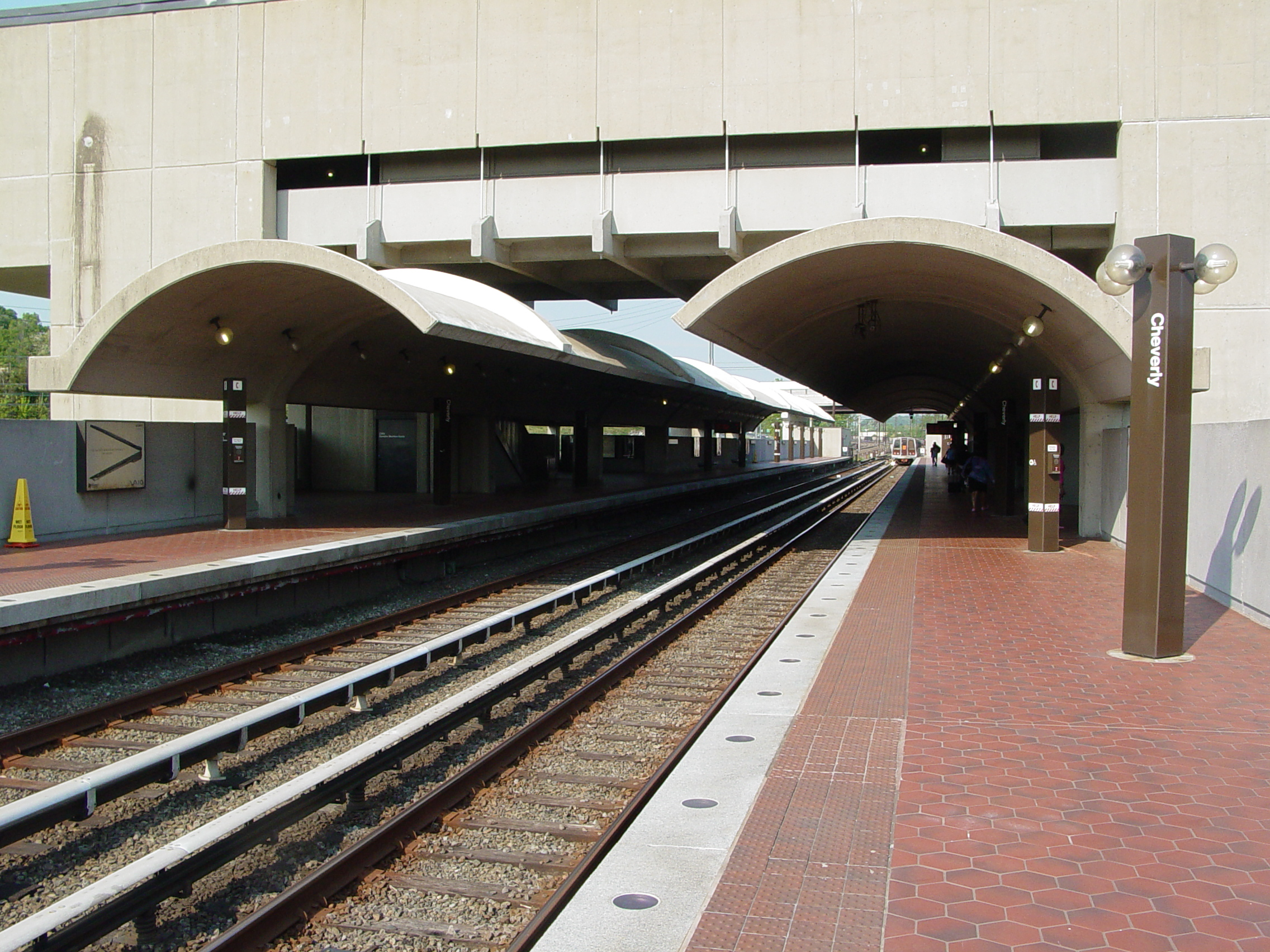
- Facing east on the eastbound platform in May 2005

General information
- Location: 5501 Columbia Park Road; Cheverly, Maryland
- Owner: Washington Metropolitan Area Transit Authority
- Platforms: 2 side platforms
- Tracks: 2
- Connections: GoPGC: P22, P43, P54

Construction
- Structure type: At-grade
- Parking: 530 spaces
- Cycle facilities: 34 racks
- Accessible: Yes

Other information
- Station code: D11

History
- Opened: November 20, 1978; 47 years ago

Passengers
- 2025: 702 (average weekday)
- Rank: 97 of 98

Services
Preceding station	Washington Metro	Following station
Deanwood toward Vienna	Orange Line	Landover toward New Carrollton
Deanwood toward Ashburn	Silver Line	Landover toward New Carrollton
Former services
Preceding station	Washington Metro	Following station
Deanwood toward Huntington	Blue Line	Landover toward New Carrollton
Route map
Location

Cheverly station is a side-platformed Washington Metro station in Prince George's County, Maryland, United States. The station was opened on November 20, 1978, and is operated by the Washington Metropolitan Area Transit Authority (WMATA). Providing service for the Orange and Silver Lines, the station is the first station going east in Maryland on the line. The station is in the residential area of Cheverly at Columbia Park Road near U.S. Route 50. It is a commuter station with 530 parking spaces.

Cheverly had the lowest average weekday ridership of any Metro station until the opening of Loudoun Gateway in 2022 as part of Phase 2 of the Silver Line.

== History ==
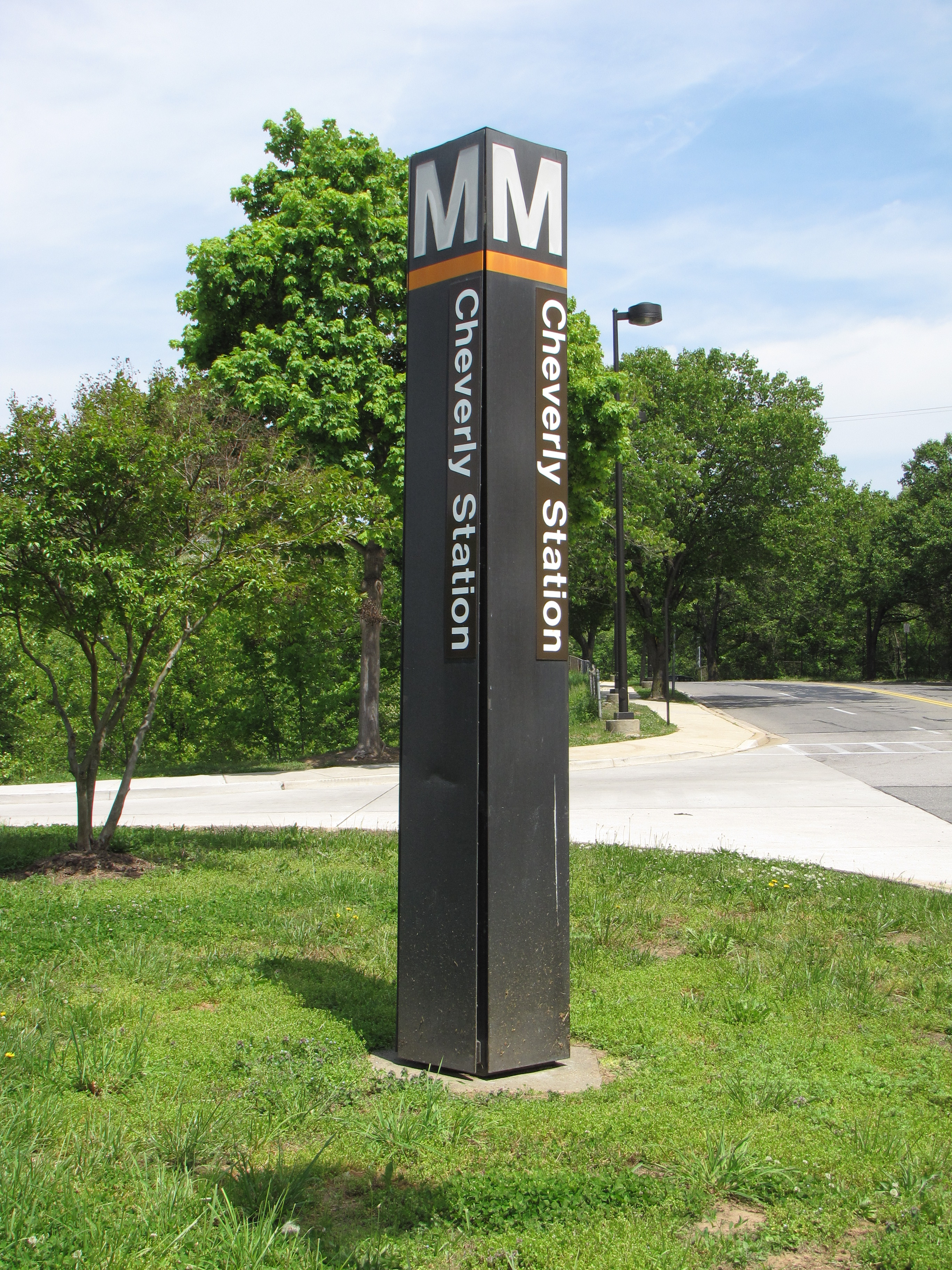
Entrance pylon at Cheverly

The station opened on November 20, 1978. Its opening coincided with the completion of 7.4 miles (11.9 km) of rail northeast of the Stadium–Armory station and the opening of the Deanwood, Landover, Minnesota Avenue, and New Carrollton stations.

From March 26, 2020, until June 28, 2020, this station was closed due to the 2020 coronavirus pandemic.

In May 2018, Metro announced an extensive renovation of platforms at twenty stations across the system. New Carrollton station was closed from May 28, 2022, through September 5, 2022, as part of the summer platform improvement project, which also affected the Minnesota Avenue, Deanwood, Cheverly, and Landover stations on the Orange Line. Shuttle buses and free parking were provided at the closed stations.

On September 10, 2022, Blue Line trains started serving the station due to the 14th Street bridge shutdown as a part of the Blue Plus service. The service ended on May 7, 2023 with the reopening of the Yellow Line.

Half of Silver Line trains began operating between Ashburn and New Carrollton on June 22, 2025.

== Station layout ==
The Cheverly station consists of dual at-grade side platforms located between the Northeast Corridor to the north and CSX tracks to the south. Access to the station is from the south, with a bus bay and parking lots off of Columbia Park Road. Fare gates and other station infrastructure such as platform access and ticket machines are located within an elevated bridge passing over the CSX and Metro tracks, with the only entrance being to the south of the station.
