= Brizzolara =

Brizzolara may refer to:

== People ==
- Carlo Brizzolara, Author
- Diane Brizzolara, Author of multiple stories from Weird Tales
- Emer Brizzolara, Member of And Also the Trees band
- John Brizzolara, Author of multiple stories from Weird Tales
- Luigi Brizzolara (1868–1937), Italian sculptor
- Ralph Brizzolara (1895–1972), American football executive
- Thomas L. Brizzolara, Borough Council member in Norwood, New Jersey
- Tony Brizzolara (born 1957), Major League Baseball player

== Other ==
- Brizzolara Creek, Tributary of Stenner Creek, flows through Cal Poly campus
- Brizzolara, Frazioni of Borzonasca
- Brizzolara Family Foundation
