= Chicago Bears =

NFL team in Chicago, Illinois

- Current season
Logo	Wordmark
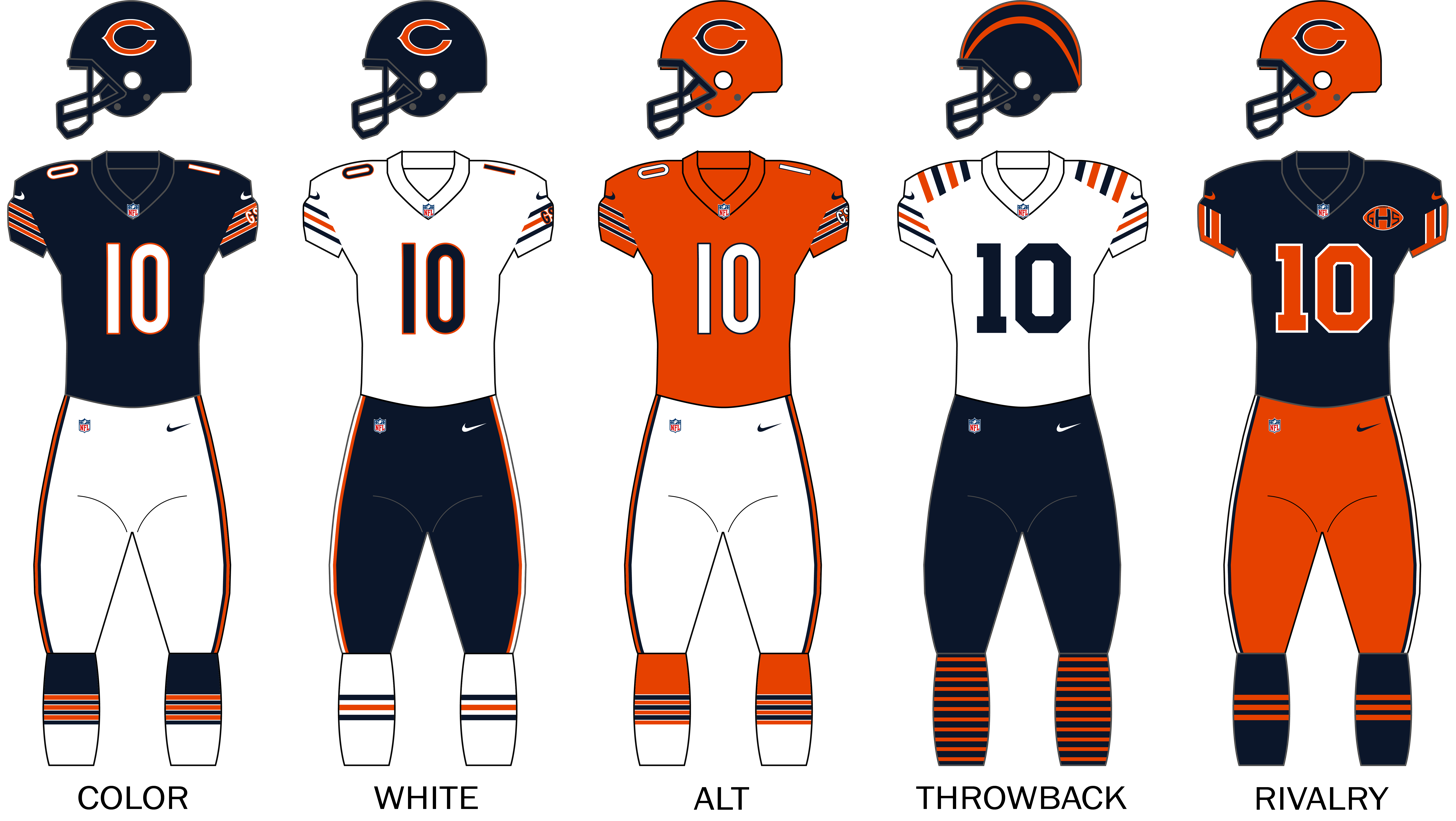
- Uniforms

General information
- Founded: September 17, 1920; 106 years ago
- Stadium: Soldier Field; Chicago, Illinois
- Headquartered: Halas Hall; Lake Forest, Illinois
- Colors: Navy blue, orange, white
- Fight song: "Bear Down, Chicago Bears"
- Mascot: Staley Da Bear
- Website: chicagobears.com

Personnel
- Owner: George McCaskey
- General manager: Ryan Poles
- Head coach: Ben Johnson
- President: Kevin Warren

Nicknames
- Da Bears; Monsters of the Midway

Team history
- Decatur Staleys (1920); Chicago Staleys (1921); Chicago Bears (1922–present)

Home fields
- Staley Field (1919–1920); Wrigley Field (1921–1970); Soldier Field (1971–2001, 2003–present); Temporary stadiums 1970 due to renovations to Wrigley Field: Dyche Stadium (one game); 2002 due to renovations to Soldier Field: Memorial Stadium

League / conference affiliations
- National Football League (1920–present): Western Division (1933–1949); National Conference (1950–1952); Western Conference (1953–1969); Central Division (1967–1969); National Football Conference (1970–present); NFC Central (1970–2001); NFC North (2002–present)

Championships
- League championships: 9: NFL championships (pre-1970 AFL–NFL merger) (8) 1921, 1932, 1933, 1940, 1941, 1943, 1946, 1963; Super Bowl championships: 1 1985 (XX)
- Conference championships: 4: NFL Western: 1956, 1963; NFC: 1985, 2006
- Division championships: 20: NFL Western: 1933, 1934, 1937, 1940, 1941, 1942, 1943, 1946; NFC Central: 1984, 1985, 1986, 1987, 1988, 1990, 2001; NFC North: 2005, 2006, 2010, 2018, 2025

Playoff appearances (29)
- NFL: 1932, 1933, 1934, 1937, 1940, 1941, 1942, 1943, 1946, 1950, 1956, 1963, 1977, 1979, 1984, 1985, 1986, 1987, 1988, 1990, 1991, 1994, 2001, 2005, 2006, 2010, 2018, 2020, 2025

Owners
- A. E. Staley (1920–1921); George Halas and Edward Sternaman (1921–1931); George Halas (1931–1983); Virginia Halas McCaskey (1983–2025) (Note: Principal owner and control 80.3% of the stocks held by her family. Pat Ryan and Andrew J. McKenna's estate own 19.7% of the club.); George McCaskey (2025–present)

The Chicago Bears are a professional American football team based in Chicago. The Bears compete in the National Football League (NFL) as a member of the National Football Conference (NFC) North division. They are one of two remaining franchises from the NFL's founding in 1920, along with the Arizona Cardinals (originally the Racine Cardinals of Chicago). The Bears play their home games at Soldier Field on the Near South Side, adjacent to Lake Michigan. The team headquarters, Halas Hall, is in the Chicago suburb of Lake Forest, Illinois. The Bears practice at adjoining facilities there during the season, and began hosting training camp at Halas Hall in 2020 after major renovations.

The franchise was founded in Decatur, Illinois, on September 20, 1919 as the Decatur Staleys, a works team of the A. E. Staley starch company. They became professional on September 17, 1920 as charter members of the American Professional Football Association (forerunner of the NFL), and moved to Chicago in 1921. They became the Bears in 1922. The Bears played home games at Wrigley Field on Chicago's North Side through the 1970 season; they have played since then at Soldier Field. The team have won nine NFL Championships, eight before the AFL–NFL merger and one Super Bowl. They hold the NFL records for the most enshrinees in the Pro Football Hall of Fame and the most retired jersey numbers. The Bears' NFL championships and overall victories are second behind the Green Bay Packers, with whom they have a long-standing rivalry. The Bears reached their greatest modern period of success in the 1980s under head coach Mike Ditka, with whom they won Super Bowl XX in the 1985 season. The Bears appeared in their second Super Bowl during the 2006 season, which they lost to the Indianapolis Colts.

Since 2006, the Bears have struggled to find regular success, going fifteen years in between playoff wins from 2011 to 2026. During that time, the Bears have had 23 different starting quarterbacks and six different head coaches. In September 2025, a sale of a minority stake in the team valued the Bears at $8.9 billion.

== History ==
=== 1919–1939: Early Bears ===
In March of 1920 a man telephoned me ... George Chamberlain and he was general superintendent of the A.E. Staley Company ... In 1919, [the company's Fellowship Club] had formed a football team. It had done well against other local teams but Mr. Staley wanted to build it into a team that could compete successfully with the best semi-professional and industrial teams in the country ... Mr. Chamberlain asked if I would like to come to Decatur and work for the Staley Company.

— George Halas, in his book Halas by Halas

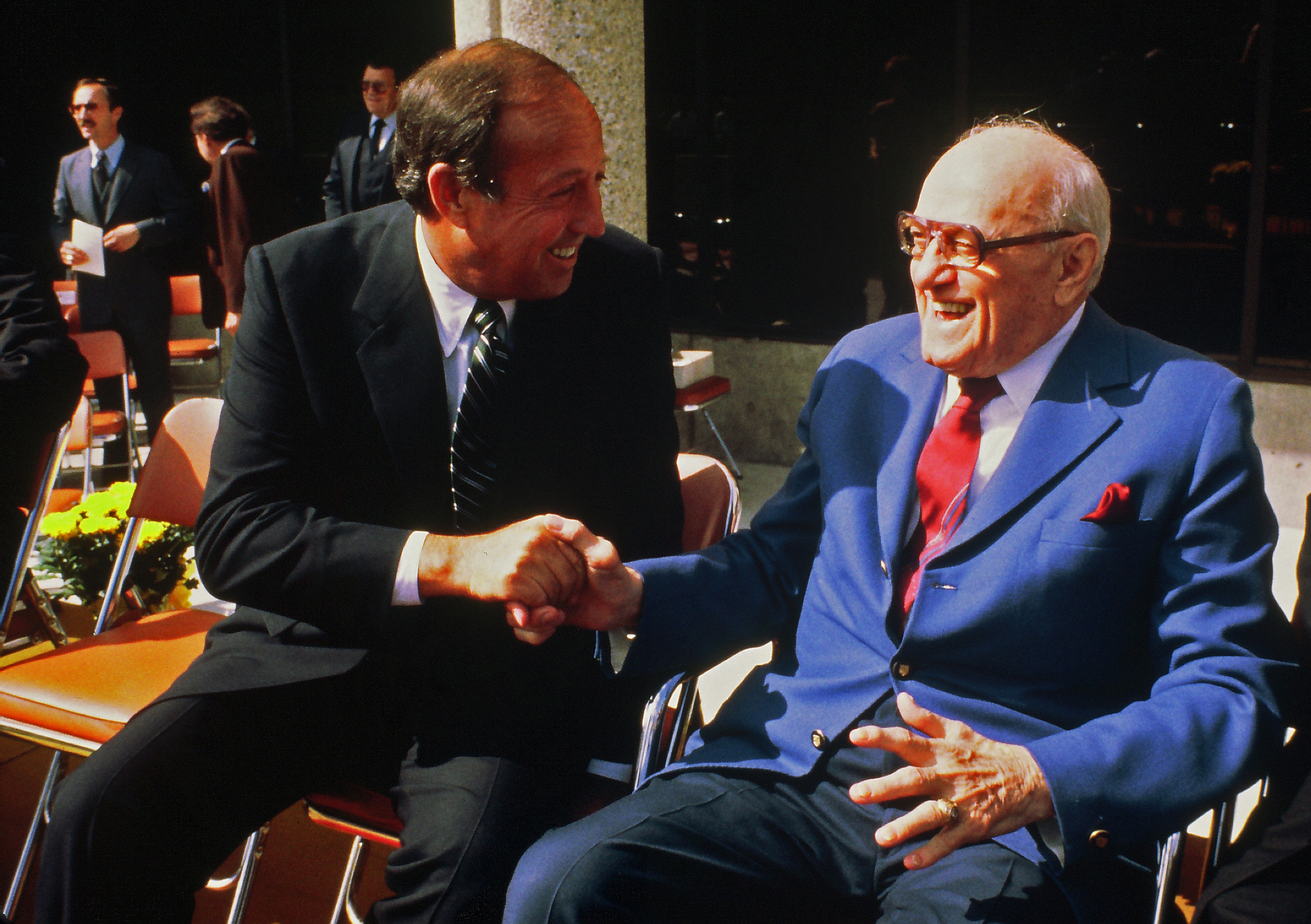
Bears founder George Halas (right) with NFL commissioner Pete Rozelle (early 1980s)

Originally named the Decatur Staleys, the club was established by the A. E. Staley food starch company of Decatur, Illinois, as a company team. This was the typical start for several early professional football franchises. The team played independently in 1919, winning the Central Illinois Championship. The company hired George Halas and Edward "Dutch" Sternaman in 1920 to run the team. The 1920 Decatur Staleys season was their inaugural regular season completed in the newly formed American Professional Football Association (AFPA) (later renamed the National Football League (NFL) in 1922).

Full control of the team was turned over to Halas and Sternaman in 1921. Official team and league records cite Halas as the founder as he took over the team in 1920 when it became a charter member of the NFL.

The team moved to Chicago in 1921, where the club was renamed the Chicago Staleys; Under an agreement reached by Halas and Sternaman with Staley, they received US$5,000 to keep the name "Staleys" for the 1921 season.

In 1922, Halas changed the team name from the Staleys to the Bears. The team moved into Wrigley Field, home of the Chicago Cubs baseball franchise. As with several early NFL franchises, the Bears derived their nickname from their city's baseball team (bears' young are called "cubs"). Halas liked the bright orange-and-blue colors of his alma mater, the University of Illinois, and the Bears adopted those colors as their own, albeit in a darker shade of each (the blue is Pantone 5395, navy blue, and the orange is Pantone 1665, similar to burnt orange).

The Staleys/Bears dominated the league in the early years. Their rivalry with the Chicago Cardinals, the oldest in the NFL (and a crosstown rival from 1920 to 1959), was key in four out of the first six league titles. During the league's first six years, the Bears lost twice to the Canton Bulldogs (who took two league titles over that span), and split with their crosstown rival Cardinals (going 4–4–2 against each other over that span), but no other team in the league defeated the Bears more than a single time. During that span, the Bears posted 34 shutouts.

The Bears' rivalry with the Green Bay Packers is one of the oldest and most storied in American professional sports, dating back to 1921 (the Green Bay Packers were an independent team until they joined the NFL in 1921). In one infamous incident that year, Halas got the Packers expelled from the league in order to prevent their signing a particular player, and then graciously got them re-admitted after the Bears had closed the deal with that player.

The franchise was an early success under Halas, capturing the NFL Championship in 1921 and remaining competitive throughout the decade.

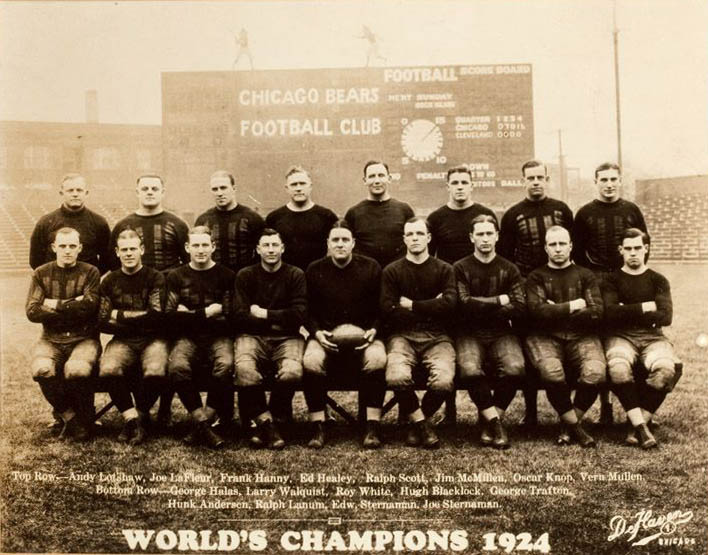
The 1924 team photo

On December 7, 1924, the Bears claimed the championship after defeating the Cleveland Bulldogs, even putting the title "World's Champions" on their 1924 team photo. The NFL had ruled, however, that games after November 30 did not count towards league standings, and the Bears had to settle for second place behind Cleveland. Their only first losing season came in 1929; it remained the team's only such season until 1945.

During the 1920s the club was responsible for triggering the NFL's long-standing rule that a player could not be signed until his college's senior class had graduated. The NFL took that action as a consequence of the Bears' aggressive signing of famous University of Illinois player Red Grange within a day of his final game as a collegian.

Despite much of the on-field success, the Bears were a team in trouble. They faced the problem of increased operating costs and flatlined attendance. The Bears would only draw roughly 5,000–6,000 fans a game, while a University of Chicago game would draw 40,000–50,000 fans a game. By adding top college football draw Red Grange to the roster, the Bears knew that they found something to draw more fans to their games. C.C. Pyle was able to secure a $2,000 per game contract for Grange, and in one of the first games, the Bears defeated the Green Bay Packers, 21–0. However, Grange remained on the sidelines while learning the team's plays from Bears quarterback Joey Sternaman. Later in 1925, the Bears went on a barnstorming tour, showing off the best football player of the day. 75,000 people paid to see Grange lead the Bears to a 17–7 victory over the Los Angeles Tigers, who were a quickly put together team of West Coast college all-stars. After a loss to San Francisco, the Bears cruised to a 60–3 win over a semi-pro team called the Portland All Stars.

Any hopes that Grange would lead the Bears to glory in 1926 were quickly dashed. A failed contract talk led to Grange bolting to a team in the newly-formed American Football League (AFL), the New York Yankees, which was owned by Pyle. The Bears also lost star quarterback Joey Sternaman, who joined the Chicago Bulls of the AFL. The Bears replaced Grange with Paddy Driscoll, a star football player in his own right. The Bears used the money made from the Grange barn-storming tour to sign the man who replaced him. Grange split his time between making movies and playing football. However, the time was not right to have two competing pro football leagues, and the AFL folded after only one season. Grange would return to the Bears.

After the financial losses of the 1932 Championship season, Halas's partner Dutch Sternaman left the organization. Halas maintained full control of the Bears until his death in 1983. He also coached the team off-and-on for forty seasons, an NFL record. In the 1932 "Unofficial" NFL Championship, the Bears defeated the Portsmouth Spartans in the first NFL playoff game. Due to blizzard conditions in Chicago, the game was played at Chicago Stadium, marking it as the first indoor NFL game.

The success of the playoff game led the NFL to institute a championship game. In the first NFL Championship, the Bears played against the New York Giants, defeating them 23–21. The teams met again in the 1934 NFL Championship where the Giants, wearing sneakers defeated the Bears 30–13 on a cold, icy day at the Polo Grounds.

=== 1940s: The Monsters of the Midway ===
From 1940 to 1947, quarterback Sid Luckman led the Bears to victories in four out of the five NFL Championship Games in which they appeared. The team acquired the University of Chicago's discarded nickname "Monsters of the Midway" and their famous helmet wishbone-C, as well as a newly penned theme song that declared them "The Pride and Joy of Illinois". One famous victory during that period was their 73–0 victory over the favored Washington Redskins at Griffith Stadium in the 1940 NFL Championship Game; the score is still an NFL record for lopsided results. The secret behind the one-sided outcome was the introduction of a new offensive formation by Halas. The T-formation, as Halas named it, involved two running backs instead of the traditional one in the backfield. Luckman established himself as one of the franchise's most elite quarterbacks. Between 1939 and 1950, he set the Bears' passing records for most career touchdowns, yards, and completions. Many of Luckman's records stood for decades before they were eclipsed by Jay Cutler in 2014.

Cutler then went on to break Luckman's franchise record for most career passing touchdowns a year later in 2015.

=== 1950s–1968: Late-Halas era ===
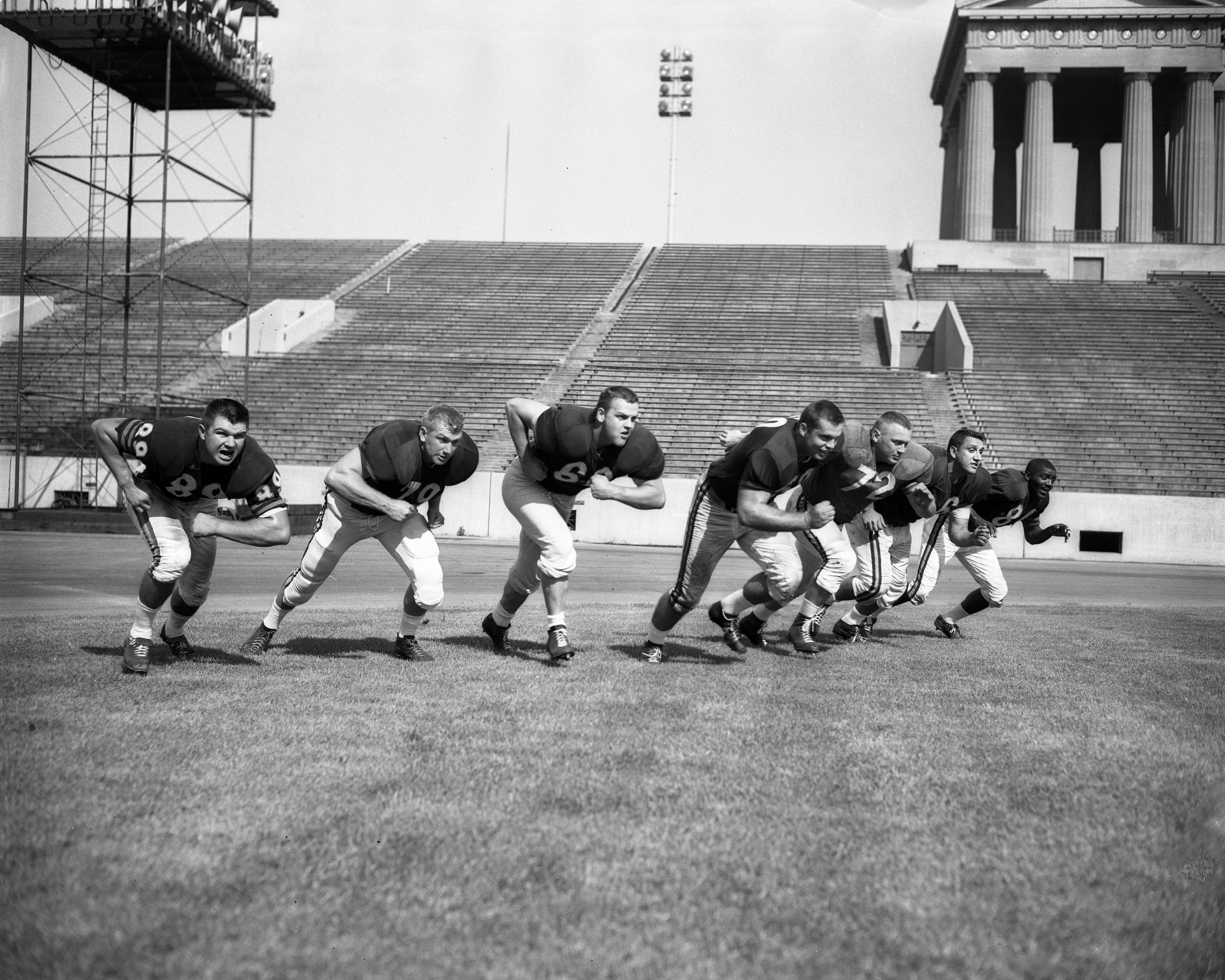
1961 Bears offensive line practicing for the Armed Forces Benefit Football Game

After declining throughout the 1950s, the team rebounded in 1963 to capture its eighth NFL Championship, which would be its last until 1985. The late 1960s and early-1970s produced notable players like Dick Butkus, Gale Sayers, and Brian Piccolo, who died of embryonal carcinoma in 1970. The American television network ABC aired a movie about Piccolo in 1971 entitled Brian's Song, starring James Caan and Billy Dee Williams in the roles of Piccolo and Sayers respectively; Jack Warden won an Emmy Award for his performance as Halas. The movie was later released for theater screenings after first being shown on television. Despite Hall of Fame careers, Butkus and Sayers would also have their careers cut short due to injuries, hamstringing the Bears of this era.

Halas retired as coach in 1967 and spent the rest of his days in the front office. He became the only person to be involved with the NFL throughout the first 60 years of its existence. He was also a member of the Pro Football Hall of Fame's first induction class in 1963. As the only living founder of the NFL at the February 1970 merger between the NFL and the American Football League, the owners honored Halas by electing him the first President of the National Football Conference, a position that he held until his death in 1983. In his honor, the NFL named the NFC Championship trophy as the George Halas Memorial Trophy.

=== 1969–1982: Struggles ===
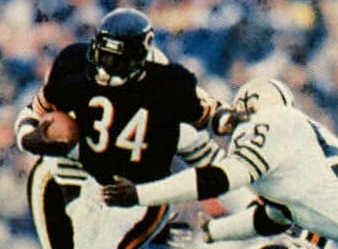
Payton set several franchise and NFL records in rushing during his 13-season career with the Bears.

After the merger, the Bears finished the 1970 season last place in their division, a repeat of their placing in the 1969 season. In 1975, the Bears drafted Walter Payton from Jackson State University with their first pick. He won the NFL Most Valuable Player award in the 1977–78 season. Payton would go on to eclipse Jim Brown's NFL career rushing record in 1984 before retiring in 1987, and would hold the mark until 2002, when Emmitt Smith of the Dallas Cowboys surpassed it. Payton's career and personality would capture the hearts of Bear fans, who called him "Sweetness". He died from a rare form of liver cancer in 1999 at the age of 45.

On November 1, 1983, a day after the death of George Halas, his oldest daughter, Virginia McCaskey, took over as the majority owner of the team. Her husband, Ed McCaskey, succeeded her father as the chairman of the board. Their son Michael became the third president in team history. Virginia holds the honorary title of "secretary of the board of directors", but has been called the glue that holds the franchise together. Virginia's reign as the owner of the Bears was not planned, as her father originally earmarked her brother, George "Mugs" Halas Jr. as the heir apparent to the franchise. However, he died of a heart attack in 1979. Her impact on the team is well-noted as her own family has dubbed her "The First Lady of Sports", and the Chicago Sun-Times has listed her as one of Chicago's most powerful women.

=== 1983–1985: Contenders, then Super Bowl champions ===
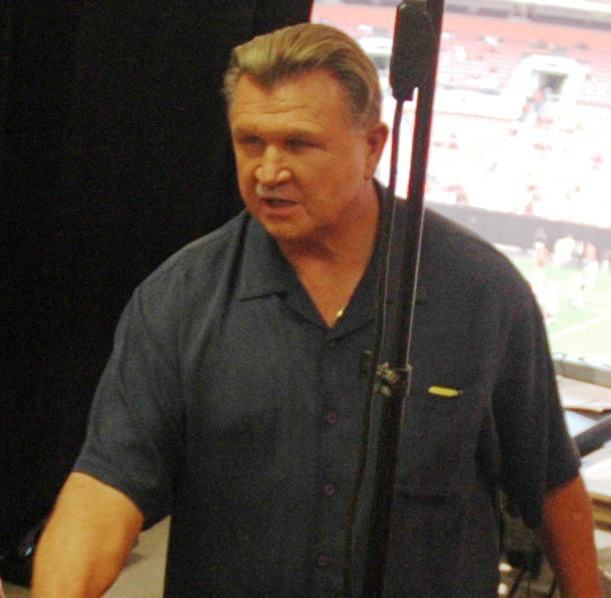
Bears Hall of Famer Mike Ditka is the only person in the modern era to win an NFL championship as a player and coach for the Chicago Bears.

Mike Ditka, a tight end for the Bears from 1961 to 1966, was hired to coach the team by George Halas in 1982. His gritty personality earned him the nickname "Iron Mike". The team reached the NFC Championship game, losing to the San Francisco 49ers 23–0, in 1984. In the 1985 season the fire in the Bears–Packers rivalry was re-lit when Ditka used 315-pound defensive tackle "Refrigerator" Perry as a running back in a touchdown play at Lambeau Field, against the Packers. The Bears won their ninth NFL Championship, first since the AFL-NFL merger, in Super Bowl XX after the 1985 season in which they dominated the NFL with their then-revolutionary 46 defense and a cast of characters that recorded the novelty rap song "The Super Bowl Shuffle". The season was notable in that the Bears had only one loss, the "unlucky 13th" game of the season, a Monday night affair in which they were defeated by the Miami Dolphins. At the time, much was made of the fact that the 1972 Dolphins were the only franchise in history to have had an undefeated season and post-season. The Dolphins came close to setting up a rematch in the Super Bowl, but lost to the New England Patriots in the AFC title game. "The Super Bowl Shuffle" was videotaped the day after that Monday night loss in Miami.

=== 1986–2003: Post-Super Bowl era ===
After the 1985 championship season, the Bears remained competitive throughout the 1980s but failed to return to the Super Bowl under Ditka. Throughout the remainder of his tenure, Ditka led the Bears to five more postseason berths, getting as far as the NFC Championship in the 1988 season. Between the firing of Ditka and the hiring of Lovie Smith, the Bears had two head coaches, Dave Wannstedt and Dick Jauron. While both head coaches led the team to the playoffs once (Wannstedt in 1994 and Jauron in 2001), neither was able to accumulate a winning record or bring the Bears back to the Super Bowl. Therefore, the 1990s was largely considered to be a disappointment.

Before the Bears hired Jauron in January 1999, Dave McGinnis (Arizona's defensive coordinator, and a former Bears assistant under Ditka and Wannstedt) backed out of taking the head coaching position. The Bears scheduled a press conference to announce the hiring before McGinnis agreed to contract terms. Soon after Jauron's hiring, Mrs. McCaskey fired her son Michael as president, replacing him with Ted Phillips and promoting Michael to chairman of the board. Phillips became the first man outside of the Halas-McCaskey family to run the team. From 1997 to 2000, the Bears suffered four consecutive last place finishes within the division.

In the 2001 season, Jim Miller took over as the primary starting quarterback and helped lead the Bears to a resurgent 13–3 record and division title. The 2001 team did not see any postseason success as they fell 33–19 to the Philadelphia Eagles in the Divisional Round. The 2002 season saw a setback as the team went 4–12. The team improved to a 7–9 record in 2003 but still missed the postseason. Jauron was fired after the 2003 season.

=== 2004–2012: Lovie Smith era ===
Lovie Smith, hired on January 15, 2004, was the third post-Ditka head coach. Joining the Bears as a rookie head coach, Smith brought the highly successful Tampa 2 defensive scheme with him to Chicago. Before his second season with the Bears, the team rehired their former offensive coordinator and then Illinois head coach Ron Turner to improve the Bears' struggling offense. In 2005, the Bears won their division and reached the playoffs for the first time in four years. Their previous playoff berth was earned by winning the NFC Central in 2001. The Bears improved upon their success the following season, by clinching their second consecutive NFC North title during Week 13 of the 2006 season, winning their first playoff game since 1995, and earning a trip to Super Bowl XLI. However, they fell short of the championship, losing 29–17 to the Indianapolis Colts. After the 2006 season, the club gave Smith—the lowest-paid head coach in the NFL—a contract extension through 2011, at roughly $5 million per year.

The club has played in over a thousand games since becoming a charter member of the NFL in 1920. Through the 2010 season, they led the NFL in overall franchise wins with 704 and had an overall record of 704–512–42 (687–494–42 during the regular season, 17–18 in the playoffs). On November 18, 2010, the Bears recorded franchise win number 700 against the Miami Dolphins.

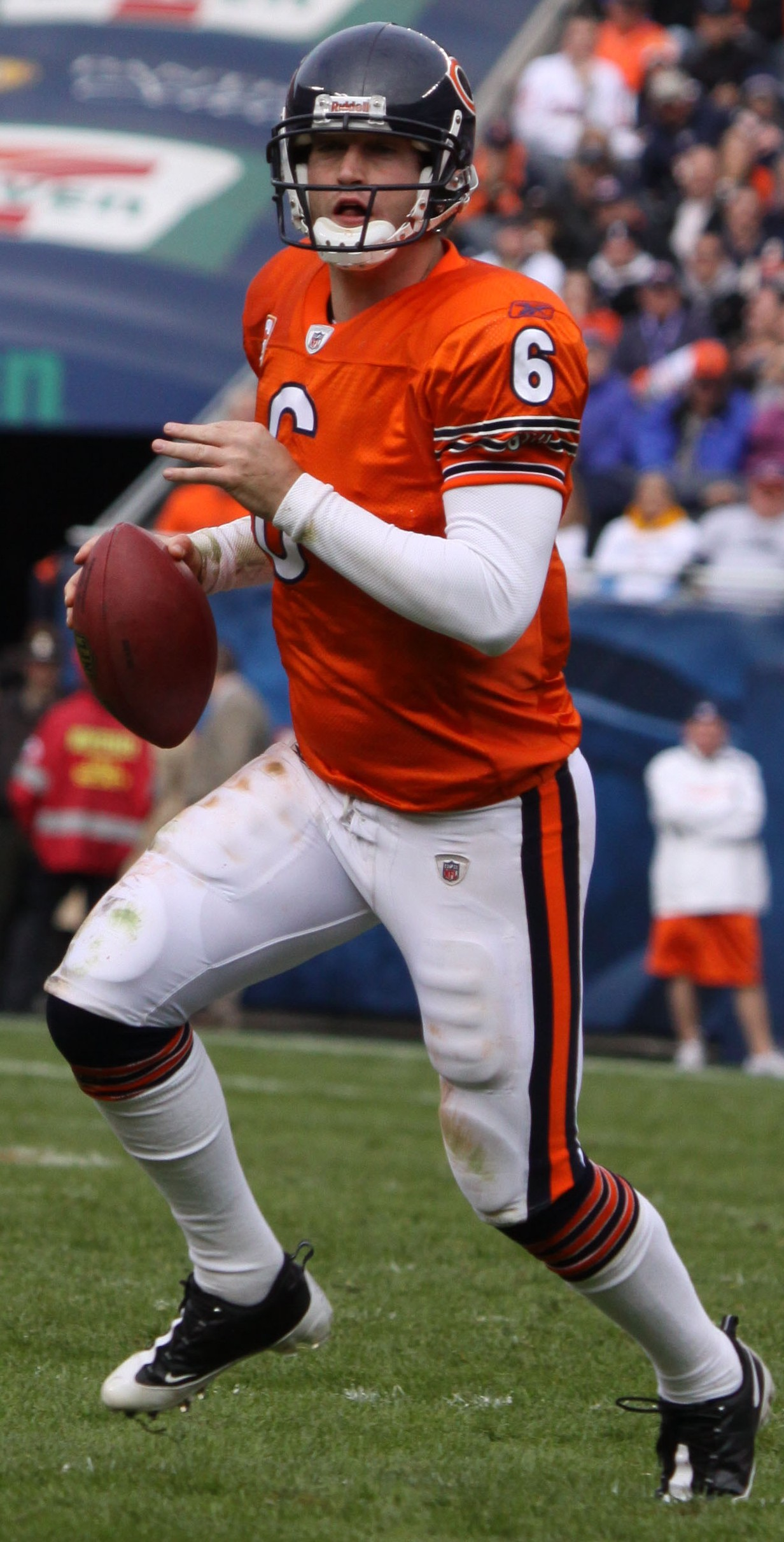
The Bears made one of the biggest trades in team history by acquiring Pro Bowl quarterback Jay Cutler in 2009.

On April 2, 2009, the Bears made one of the biggest trades in franchise history: acquiring Pro Bowl quarterback Jay Cutler from the Denver Broncos for Kyle Orton and draft picks. After a disappointing 2009 campaign with the team going 7–9, Mike Martz was hired as the team's offensive coordinator on February 1, 2010. On March 5, 2010, the Bears signed defensive end Julius Peppers, running back Chester Taylor, and tight end Brandon Manumaleuna, spending over $100 million on the first day of free agency. Also during the 2010 offseason, Michael McCaskey was replaced by brother George McCaskey as chairman of the Bears. With a 38–34 win against the New York Jets, the Bears clinched the No. 2 seed and a first-round bye for the 2010–11 NFL playoffs. In their first playoff game since Super Bowl XLI, the Bears defeated the No. 4 seed Seattle Seahawks 35–24 in the Divisional Round. The Bears reached the NFC Championship Game, where they played Green Bay Packers at Soldier Field – only the second playoff meeting between the two storied rivals, the first playoff game having been played in 1941. The Bears lost the game, 21–14.

The team started the 2011 season strong with a 7–3 record, and running back Matt Forté led the NFL in total yards from scrimmage. Eventually, quarterback Jay Cutler fractured his thumb, and Forté also was lost for the season against the Kansas City Chiefs after spraining his MCL, and the Bears, with Caleb Hanie playing, lost five straight before winning against the Minnesota Vikings with Josh McCown starting over Hanie. At season's end, general manager Jerry Angelo was fired, and former Chiefs director of scouting and former Bears scout Phil Emery was brought in. Offensive coordinator Mike Martz resigned, and eventually retired, and was replaced by offensive line coach Mike Tice. The Bears made another notable move by trading for Miami Dolphins receiver and Pro Bowl MVP Brandon Marshall. In 2012, the Bears became the first team in NFL history to return six interceptions for touchdowns in the first seven games of the season, with another pick-six by Brian Urlacher in Week 9 bringing Chicago two behind the record set by the 1961 San Diego Chargers. However, the Bears missed the playoffs with a record of 10–6 (after starting the season 7–1, the first team to start with that record and miss the playoffs since the 1996 Washington Redskins), and Smith was fired on December 31.

=== 2013–2014: Marc Trestman years ===
Then-CFL head coach and former NFL journeyman Marc Trestman was hired to succeed Smith after an exhaustive search that included at least 13 known candidates. On March 20, 2013, Brian Urlacher's 13-year tenure with the Bears ended when both sides failed to agree on a contract. The Trestman era began on September 8 with a 24–21 win over the Cincinnati Bengals, making Trestman the fourth head coach in Bears history to win in his coaching debut, after George Halas (1920), Neill Armstrong (1978) and Dick Jauron (1999). The Bears ended the 2013 season 8–8, barely missing the playoffs after losing in the final week of the season to the Packers. Despite having a second-ranked offense that set numerous franchise records, the defense greatly worsened as it set franchise worsts in categories like yards allowed (6,313).

The following season was a disaster for the Bears, with the offense regressing to finish outside the top 20 in scoring. The team also allowed 50-point games in two straight weeks against the Patriots and Packers, including a franchise-high 42 points and NFL-record six touchdowns allowed in the first half against the latter, to become the first team since the 1923 Rochester Jeffersons to allow at least 50 points in consecutive games. The Bears ended the year 5–11 and last in the NFC North. Trestman and Emery were fired after the season ended.

=== 2015–2017: John Fox years ===
The Bears hired Ryan Pace of the New Orleans Saints to be their new general manager on January 8, 2015. On January 16, 2015, John Fox accepted a four-year deal to become head coach. In Fox's first season as head coach, the Bears saw improvements from 2014; after USA Today projected the Bears to win three games, they doubled that total and finished the season with a 6–10 record, including a Thanksgiving win over the Packers at Lambeau Field.

During the 2016 season, however, the Bears regressed heavily, compiling a 3–13 record (their worst since the NFL's change to 16-game seasons in 1978). The season included several injuries to starters and secondary players, including Jay Cutler, who only played five games as a result of two separate injuries. Backup quarterback Brian Hoyer started the next three games before a broken arm put him out for the season. He was replaced by Matt Barkley, who made his first career start with the Bears. None of the three quarterbacks returned for the 2017 season.

In the 2017 NFL draft, the team selected quarterback Mitchell Trubisky with the second-overall pick, who sat behind newly signed quarterback Mike Glennon for the first four games before taking over. The Bears ended the season 5–11 and again finished last in the NFC North. On January 1, 2018, Fox was fired, ending his tenure in Chicago with a 14–34 record.

=== 2018–2021: Matt Nagy years ===
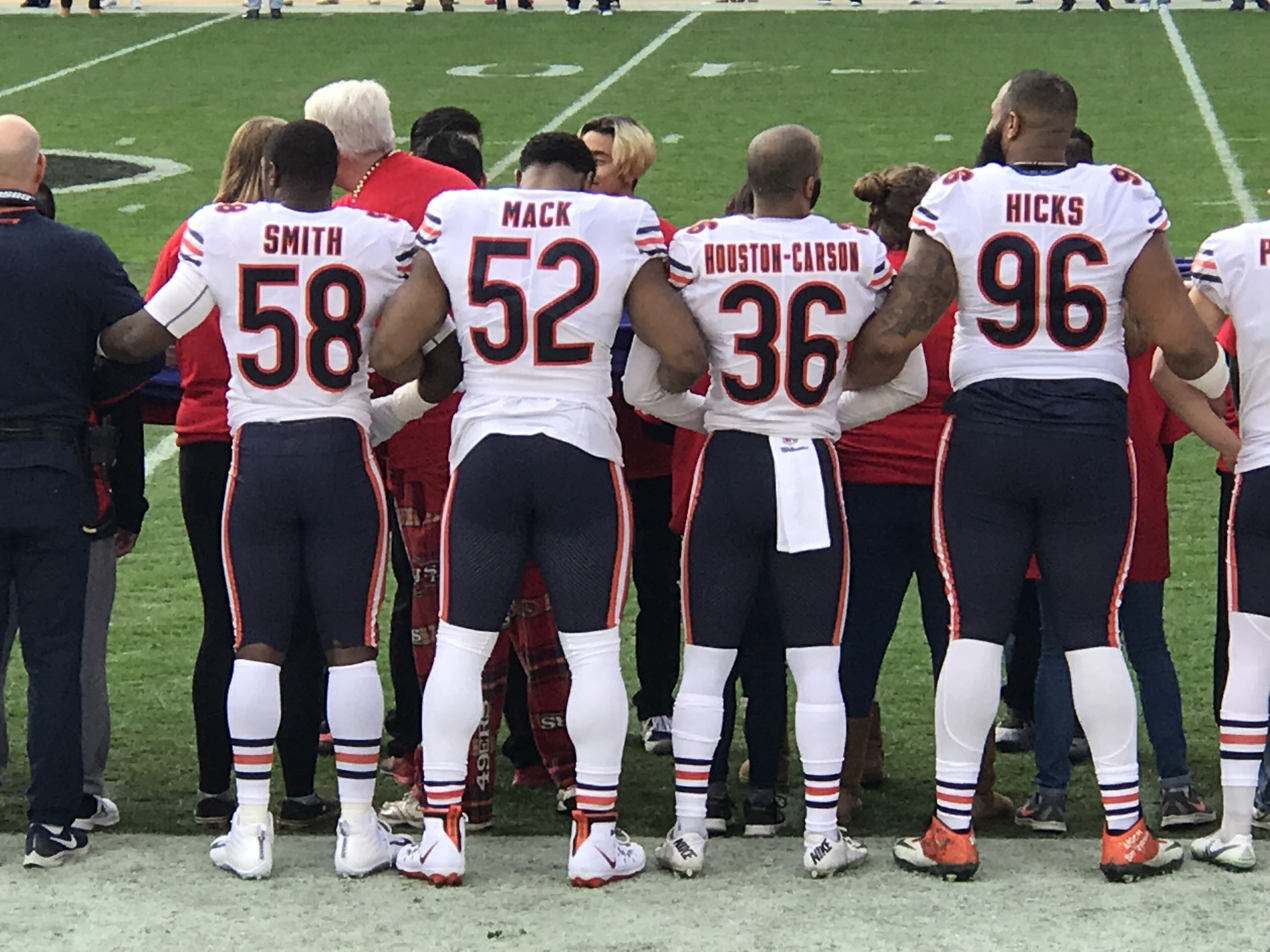
Roquan Smith, Khalil Mack, DeAndre Houston-Carson, and Akiem Hicks of the Bears (2018)

The Bears hired Matt Nagy from the Kansas City Chiefs as their new head coach in January 2018. General manager Ryan Pace signed receivers Taylor Gabriel, Allen Robinson, and Trey Burton in the offseason to complement second-year quarterback Mitchell Trubisky. The Bears also acquired linebacker Khalil Mack in a block-blockbuster trade from the Oakland Raiders to further bolster their defense, sending a package of draft picks that includes 2019 and 2020 1st round draft picks in exchange. Nagy's Bears clinched the NFC North on December 16, 2018, for the first time since 2010 with a 24–17 victory over the Green Bay Packers. The Bears finished the 2018 season with a 12–4 record. They lost to the defending Super Bowl Champions Philadelphia Eagles in the wild-card round of the playoffs after Cody Parkey's game-winning field goal attempt was partially tipped and hit the uprights in the final seconds of the game, a play coined the "Double Doink". Despite the first-round exit, Nagy was named Coach of the Year by the Pro Football Writers Association (PFWA) and Associated Press (AP). He was the first Bears coach to be given the AP award since Lovie Smith in 2005 and the fifth in team history.

In 2019, the team regressed to an 8–8 record, though Nagy's combined 20 wins in 2018 and 2019 were the most by a Bears head coach in his first two seasons. During the year, renovations to Halas Hall were completed, allowing the team to move Training Camp from Ward Field on the campus of Olivet Nazarene University in Bourbonnais, Illinois to Lake Forest for 2020.

The Bears opened the 2020 season with a 5–1 record. However, they lost their next six games. The Bears won three of their last four games to finish the season with an 8–8 record. Despite their finish, the Bears qualified for the 2020–21 NFL playoffs, which was expanded to include one additional wildcard team from each conference. The New Orleans Saints defeated the Bears in the opening round of the playoffs, 21–9. The team did not re-sign Trubisky after the 2020 season and instead allowed him to become a free agent.

Before the 2021 season, the Bears traded up in the 2021 NFL draft to select quarterback Justin Fields 11th overall. The team also signed veteran quarterback Andy Dalton in free agency. Dalton was initially declared the Bears starting quarterback, but Fields won the position after Dalton was injured. The Bears finished the season with a 6–11 record and missed the playoffs. Nagy and general manager Ryan Pace were fired after the season's conclusion. Nagy posted a 34–33 record over four seasons with two playoff berths, while Pace compiled a 48–65 record over seven seasons.

=== 2022–2024: Matt Eberflus years ===
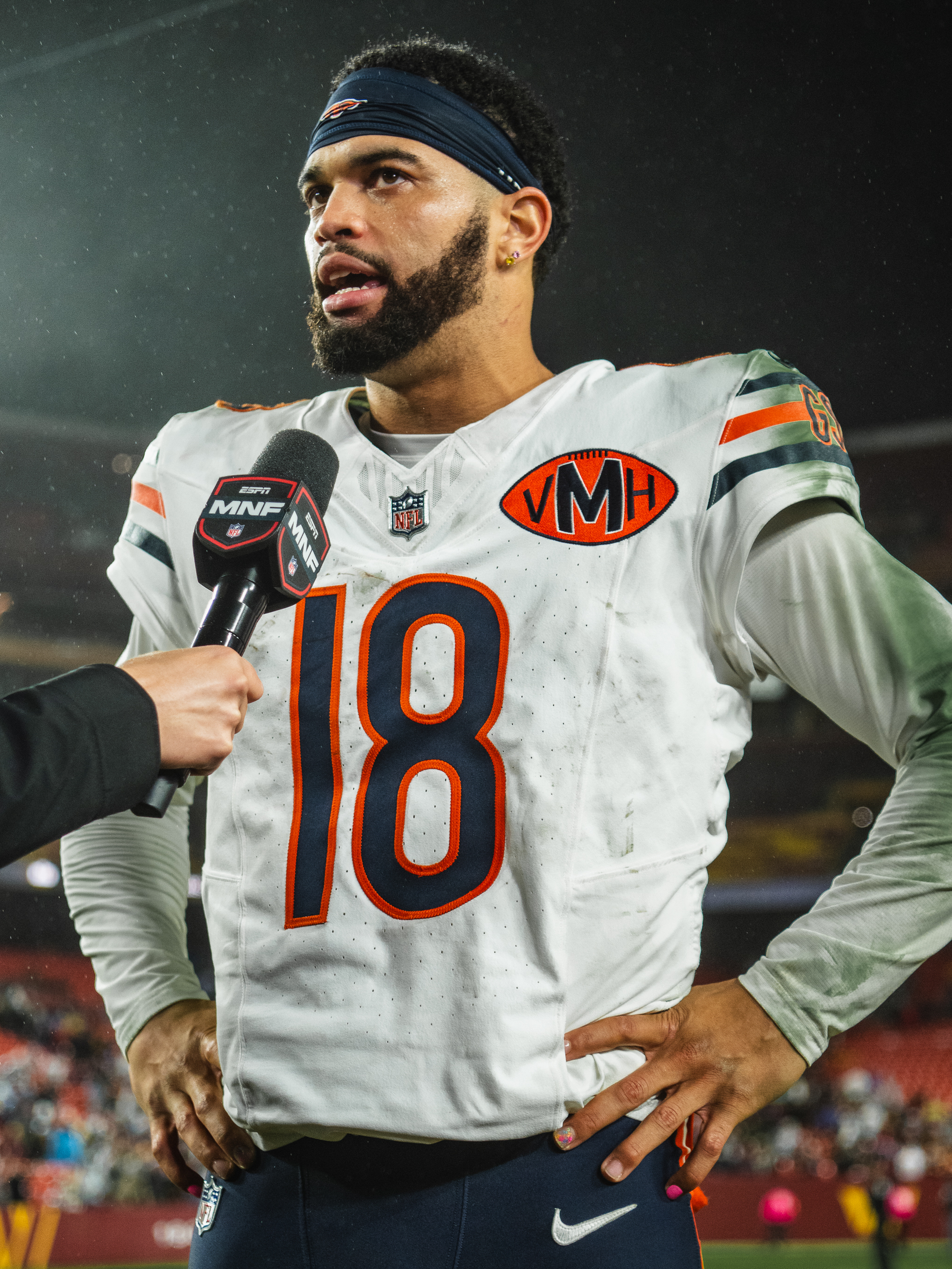
The Bears drafted quarterback Caleb Williams with the first overall pick in the 2024 NFL draft.

On January 25, 2022, the Bears hired Ryan Poles as their general manager. The team hired Matt Eberflus as the franchise's 17th head coach two days later. The Bears struggled throughout the 2022 season, which included a franchise-record 10-game losing streak. They finished with an NFL worst 3–14 record, which secured the team the first overall pick in the 2023 NFL draft. The Bears traded the first overall pick to the Carolina Panthers in exchange for wide receiver D. J. Moore and multiple draft picks. The Bears opened the 2023 season with a 0–4 record, extending the team losing streak to 14 (longest in team history; dating back to the 2022 season). The team bounced back by winning five of their last eight games, but finished with a 7–10 record, placing last in the NFC North for the second consecutive season. However, the team acquired the first overall pick in the 2024 NFL draft, which was part of their previous trade with the Panthers, who finished the 2023 season with worst record in the NFL.

The first overall pick was used on USC quarterback Caleb Williams. The Bears fired Eberflus on November 29, with five games remaining in the 2024 NFL season. Eberflus, who a posted a 14–32 overall record with the Bears, was the first head coach in team history to be fired mid-season.

=== 2025–present: Ben Johnson years ===
On January 21, 2025, the Bears hired Ben Johnson as the franchise's 18th head coach. Known for his offensive creativity, Johnson was brought in to help develop quarterback Caleb Williams and lead a new era of the team. The Bears finished the 2025 season with an 11–6 record, winning the NFC North and qualifying for the playoffs for the first time since 2020. The 2025 Bears were known for recording six late fourth-quarter comebacks, the most in NFL history during the regular season. After defeating the Packers in the Wild Card round of the playoffs, the team lost to the Los Angeles Rams in the Divisional round.

== Ownership ==
The team is primarily owned by the heirs of George Halas. Before her death, his daughter, Virginia Halas McCaskey, was the principal owner. While she held 22.6% of the team's shares, she also voted those of her 11 children and two nephews (who each own 3.8%) as well as the Brizzolara family (who own 8.33%). This effectively gave her a commanding 80.33% ownership stake. Former chairman and CEO of Aon Corp. Pat Ryan (17.67%) and former Aon director Andrew J. McKenna's estate (2%) own the remainder 19.67% of the club. Ryan is also a board member. The McCaskey family has right of first refusal on stock sale, while Ryan's block has second refusal rights.

In 2020, Forbes magazine reported that the franchise is worth $3.525 billion, making it the seventh richest franchise in the NFL. Chicago is the third largest media market in the United States.

In a Crain's Chicago Business article, one businessman described his wishes for the team to maximize its potential. In 2009, Yahoo! Sports listed the McCaskeys as the third worst owner in the NFL, stating "[T]hey get less for what they've got than any team in our league."

=== Ownership history ===
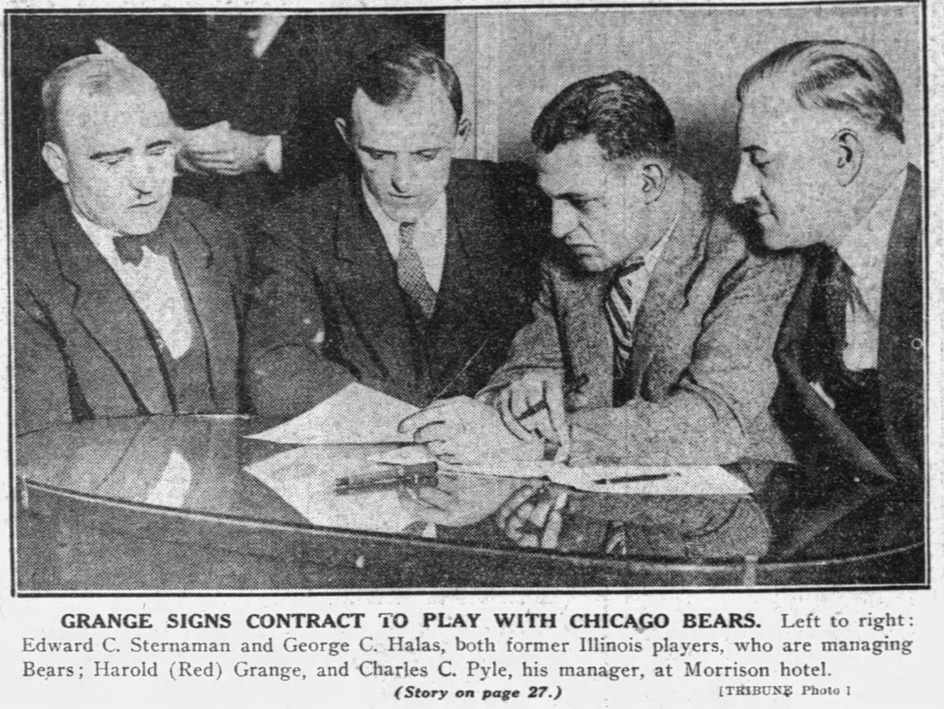
Sternaman and Halas with Grange and Pyle

The club was founded by A. E. Staley Manufacturing Company owner Augustus Eugene Staley in 1919 and was owned by the company until 1921. In 1921, Staley felt he could no longer afford the expensive burden of pro-football and transferred team ownership to Halas and paid him $5,000 for a sponsorship deal that kept the Staleys name for one more year. Halas then took on teammate Edward "Dutch" Sternaman as a partner. On January 28, 1922, the Bears were incorporated at an NFL meeting, as "a new league team" after its name change. At season's end, the two competed with agent Bill Harley for ownership of the Bears, after he negotiated a contract that was to give his brother Chic Harley and himself one-third ownership of the team as part of his contract. However, Halas and Sternaman claimed that the contract was voided when a physical revealed health impairments resultant from Harley's time in the war. The other league owners agreed to nullify the deal in favor of the Halas/Sternaman partnership by an 8–2 vote. In addition, Halas and Sternaman offered a share of the team to Paddy Driscoll, but the move was blocked by the owners in the NFL's June meeting, after the Chicago Cardinals (Driscoll's team) activated the league's reserve clause.

In 1931, Sternaman offered to sell his stake to Halas for $38,000 to focus on his other businesses. Halas' purchase agreement with Sternaman was to be paid off in installments, and stipulated that if Halas defaulted on any of the payments, ownership of the team reverted to Sternaman. Halas raised the initial funding by selling an 8.33% ownership stake to Ralph Brizzolara, as well as $5,000 of shares to Jim McMillen, and George Trafton's mother, who paid $20,000 (Halas later bought her out for $40,000). Charles Bidwill purchased $5,000 in stock in 1933 (which was later bought off of his widow Violet for $50,000 in 1949) and he also arranged a bank loan for the remaining $5,000 needed to pay off Sternaman:

But it was a mighty close call. As I remember, I finally got all the money together at 11:10 a.m. on the day the final note came due. Forfeit time was 12 o'clock noon.

— George Halas, That's The Way the Ball Bounces, 1967

Halas remained the club's principal owner until his death on October 31, 1983. His son, George "Mugs" Halas Jr., became team president and heir apparent in 1963, with George Sr. remaining chairman. Mugs died in 1979, clearing the way for his sister Virginia McCaskey to inherit the team upon George Sr.'s death.

Mugs Halas and Virginia McCaskey acquired stock in the team through gifts and sales. After Mugs' death in 1979, Halas Sr. owned a 49.35% interest in the Bears, Mugs' estate owned a 19.67% interest, while Virginia McCaskey, Jim Finks (3.5%, which he later relinquished when he resigned as the team GM), Charles Brizzolara, Robert and Carol Brizzolara in joint tenancy, and Nancy Lorenz owned the remaining outstanding shares. In 1981, the shareholders merged the Bears with a newly formed Delaware-incorporated organization, the Chicago Bears Football Club, Inc..

In 1987, Mugs' estate executor wanted to sell his ownership stake and challenged the legality of a 1981 corporate reorganization and the other owners' right of first refusal, while his heirs, Christine and Stephen Halas, wanted to keep their father's stake, asking a Cook County Probate Court judge not to allow the sale. Ultimately they failed to block the Chicago Bears from buying their father's 19.67% ownership stake of the team, which sold for $17.5 million in 1988. Bears then-president Michael McCaskey called the purchase a "terrific financial burden", and the team would later sell the stake to Chicago-area businessmen Andrew McKenna and Patrick Ryan for a then-undisclosed sum (Note: At the time it was estimated the Bears received between $20 million to $40 million, but later reports indicated the amount was $17 million.) in 1990. At the time it was also speculated that they invested to help the Bears lobby lawmakers for a domed stadium. In 2017, the NFL approved a sale of shares from Mugs' children (unreported whom or how much) to the McCaskey family for an undisclosed sum.

On February 6, 2025, Virginia McCaskey died at the age of 102. Her son, George Halas McCaskey, team chairman since 2011, became principal owner. The Bears have been in the hands of the Halas-McCaskey family for 105 years, longer than any other NFL team.

In September 2025, following the death of Andrew McKenna two years prior, the McKenna family sold their minority stake of 2.35% to the McCaskey and Ryan families in a deal that valued the team at $8.9 billion.

== Sponsorships ==
The team has major sponsorship deals with Dr Pepper Snapple Group, Miller Brewing Company, PNC Financial Services, United Airlines, Verizon, Xfinity, and Proven IT. The team was the first in the NFL to have a presenting sponsor, with the 2004 season advertised as "Bears Football presented by Bank One". Additionally, the Bears have an agreement with WFLD (the Fox owned-and-operated station in Chicago) to broadcast pre-season football games.

== Logos and uniforms ==
The club has had few official logos throughout their history. When the team was known as the Decatur Staleys in 1920, they used A. E. Staley's logo as football was intended to help promote the company. The first Chicago Bears logo was introduced in 1940, depicting a black bear running with a football. The next logo, introduced in 1946, featured a navy blue bear on top of a football.

In 1962, the Bears introduced their trademark "wishbone-C" logo for the first time. Initially white with a black outline, the logo is similar to the "C" long worn on the Cincinnati Reds' baseball caps, and very closely resembles the University of Chicago Maroons' "C" logo introduced in 1898. The change in the Bears' logo was due to the addition of logos on helmets, which professional football teams began adding in the late 1950s and early 1960s.

In 2023, the Bears made their primary logo the orange bear head, which was previously their secondary logo since 1999. Despite demoting the "C" to a secondary logo, the team will still retain it on their helmets and at the home field's 50-yard line.

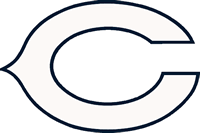
Primary logo (1962–1973)

Primary logo (1974–2022)
Secondary logo (2023–present)

Wordmark logo (1974–present)

Secondary logo (1999–2022)
Primary logo (2023–present)

== Team culture ==
=== Mascots and cheerleaders ===
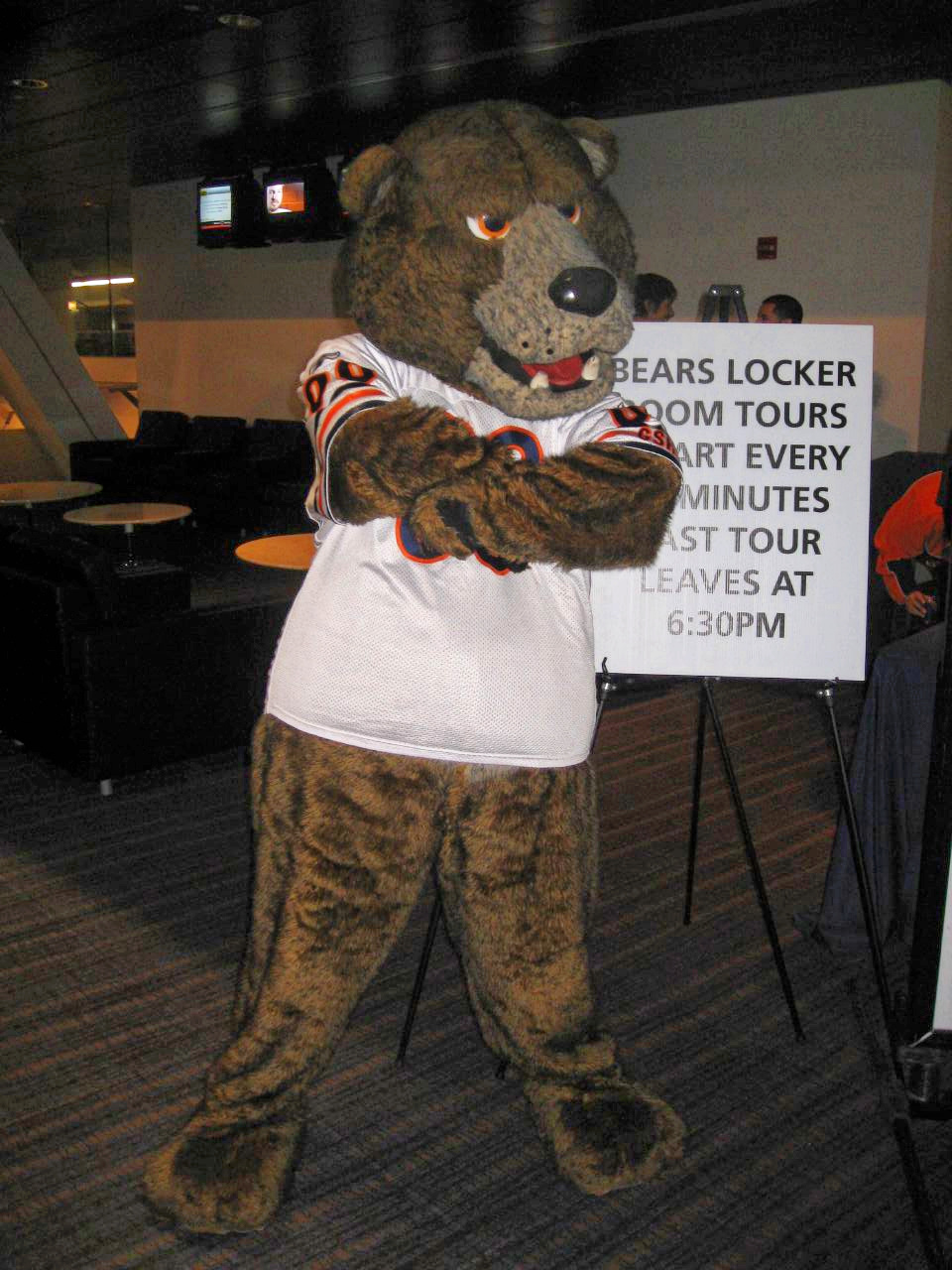
Staley Da Bear in 2008

Before the 2003 season, the team had two unofficial mascots named "Rocky" and "Bearman". "Rocky" was a man who donned a #1 Bears jersey, carried a megaphone, and started chants all over Soldier Field during the 1970s, 1980s, and early 1990s, in a fashion similar to Fireman Ed. The identity of "Rocky" is unknown, but he presumably lives in northwestern Indiana. Don Wachter, also known as "Bearman", is a season ticket holder who decided in 1995 that he could also assist the team by cheerleading, similar to Rocky. The club allowed him to run across the field with a large Bears flag during player introductions and each team score (a role more recently done by the Bears 4th Phase and Bears captains). In 1996, he donned his "costume" of face paint, bear head and arms, and a number 46 jersey. "Bearman" was forced to stop wearing his costume with the introduction of Staley Da Bear in 2003, but in 2005 Wachter was allowed in costume again.

Staley Da Bear is an anthropomorphic bear with a customized No. 00 jersey, with blue and orange eyes, synonymous with the team's main colors. His name is eponymous to starch processing company A. E. Staley, who founded the Bears' franchise. Like Rocky and Bearman, he entertains Bears fans, but like other NFL mascots, and mascots in general, Staley also visits charity events, parties, Chicago Rush AFL games, and other Bears-related events, as well as taking part in games with his "furballs" against youth football teams at halftime.

The team had a cheerleading squad called the Chicago Honey Bears beginning in 1976. However, Bears owner Virginia Halas McCaskey terminated them after the 1985 season. The squad's uniforms changed three times: from 1976 to 1979, the uniform was a white bodysuit with navy blue sleeves; from 1980 to 1984 it was a white bodysuit with orange sleeves and the navy was moved to the trim, and for the squad's final season in 1985, the uniform was redesigned with an orange sequin vest.

=== Philanthropy ===
Since 1998, the Bears have partnered with A Safe Place, a domestic violence shelter in Waukegan, Illinois. In June 2017, existing and former Bears employees helped renovate the shelter by ripping up carpet, painting walls, demolishing a kitchen and building a fence. The Bears have also provided financial support throughout the years.

== Rivalries ==
=== Divisional ===
==== Green Bay Packers ====
The Green Bay Packers are the Bears' biggest rivals since their team's inception in 1920. The Green Bay Packers currently have the lead at 103–95–6, and the teams have met thrice in the postseason. The Bears won the 1941 meeting, 33–14, and eventually defeated the New York Giants in the 1941 NFL Championship Game, and the Packers won the 2011 meeting, 21–14, en route to a Super Bowl XLV win over the Pittsburgh Steelers. The Bears and Packers met again in the postseason during the 2025–26 NFL playoffs, which concluded in a 31–27 Bears victory. The teams' first meeting was a victory for the Bears (known as the Staleys at the time) in 1921 in a shutout, 20–0. The Packers claimed their first win over the Bears in 1925, 14–10. The 1924 matchup (which ended in a 3–0 win for Chicago) was notable for featuring the first-ever ejection of players in a game in NFL history, as Frank Hanny of the Bears and Walter Voss of the Packers were ejected for punching each other. The rivalry also featured one of the last successful fair catch kicks in 1968, when Bears kicker Mac Percival kicked the game-winning field goal.

==== Detroit Lions ====
The Detroit Lions and Bears have faced off since the Lions' inception in 1930, when they were known as the Portsmouth Spartans, with the Spartans winning, 7–6, and Chicago winning the second meeting, 14–6. Since then, the Bears have led the series, 99–74–5. The rivalry grew in 1932, when the Bears and Spartans met in the first-ever postseason game in NFL history, with the Bears winning the game 9–0. The game also was known as the first pro "indoor football" game, as the game took place in indoor Chicago Stadium due to a blizzard at the time. The game also started the forward pass.

==== Minnesota Vikings ====
Chicago and Minnesota took each other on in the Vikings' inaugural game, with the Vikings defeating the Bears in a 37–13 rout, and Minnesota currently holds the series lead 60–54–2.

=== Historic ===
==== Chicago/St. Louis/Arizona Cardinals ====
The oldest continuing matchup in the NFL belongs to the Bears and the Arizona Cardinals, the only remaining NFL teams from the 1920 APFA season. It began as intense intra-city rivalry between the Bears and the Chicago Cardinals, which the Bears were leading 47–19–6 through 1959, when the Cardinals moved to St. Louis. The rivalry's importance waned further after the Cardinals moved to the Phoenix metropolitan area in 1988. The Bears lead the all-time series 59–28–6. The teams have yet to meet in the playoffs.

==== New York Giants ====
The Bears and the New York Giants squared off in six NFL championship games, more than any common match-up in either the NFL championship game or Super Bowl. The Bears won four of the six championship games, which included the Sneakers Game that the Giants won in the 1934 NFL Championship Game. The two teams also met in the 1985 and 1990 playoffs, splitting each meeting en route to a Super Bowl championship (Bears in Super Bowl XX, Giants in Super Bowl XXV). As of the 2025 season, the Bears lead the all-time series 37–25–2.

==== San Francisco 49ers ====
The Bears and San Francisco 49ers were regular foes while both played in the Western Conference. The rivalry grew during the 1980s, as both teams were constant playoff contenders in the NFC. The 49ers currently hold the series lead 35–33–1 and 3–0 in the playoffs. Under the current NFL scheduling formula, the Bears and 49ers play at least once every four years.

==== Tampa Bay Buccaneers ====
The Bears holds historic rivalry with its former NFC Central foe Tampa Bay Buccaneers. As of the 2023 season, Chicago currently holds the series lead 40–22. Under the current NFL scheduling formula, the Bears and Bucs play at least once every four years.

==== Washington Commanders ====
Although the teams never played in the same division, the Bears and the Washington Commanders have a historically significant rivalry, dating back to 1932, when the Commanders were located in Boston and were known as the Braves. The rivalry started to heat up in 1937, when Washington drafted quarterback Sammy Baugh and both teams were often met in the NFL Championship Game. The most memorable game from that era was in 1940, when the Bears set a record by defeating the Commanders 73–0 in the NFL Championship game, to this day, the largest margin of victory in league history. The series regained steam in the 1980s, when both teams were fighting for the NFC supremacy. Washington holds a slight edge in the all-time series 27–25–1 (2–1 in the playoffs and 2–2 in championship games). Under the current NFL scheduling formula, the Bears and Commanders play at least once every four years.

=== Minor ===
==== Cleveland/Los Angeles/St. Louis Rams ====
The Cleveland/Los Angeles/St. Louis Rams and the Bears played in the same division the 1937 NFL season to the 1969 NFL season (with the 1958 game attracting 100,470 fans, the largest in Bears history), while the two franchises continue to play annually until the 1980 NFL season. From 1995 to 2015 the two teams were part of the Chicago-St. Louis rivalries in the major professional leagues. As of the 2023 season, Chicago currently holds the series lead 54–39–3 (1–1 in the playoffs). It is the Rams' longest-running, non-division series. Under the current NFL scheduling formula, the Bears and Rams play at least once every four years.

==== Miami Dolphins ====
The AFC member Miami Dolphins and the Bears met fewer than 15 times but most of them were memorable. The most notable was the 1985 shootout at Monday Night, as Miami handing Chicago their first, and only, regular-season loss for the year, while keeping the 1972 Dolphins as the only perfect team in NFL history. As of the 2023 season, Miami currently holds the series lead 10–4. Under the current NFL scheduling formula, the teams play at least once every four years.

=== Defunct ===
==== Rock Island Independents ====
Chicago had a fierce instate rivalry with the Rock Island Independents in the league's first decade, with the Bears winning the series 8–1–4.

==== Canton/Cleveland Bulldogs ====
The Canton/Cleveland Bulldogs and the Staleys/Bears rivalry was between the two NFL's powerhouses in the 1920s, with games usually attracting the most fans, and the outcome often decided the fate of NFL Championship (1921–1924). The rivalry grow after the 1921 season, when the Staleys star Guy Chamberlin joined the Bulldogs and led them to three consecutive championships, including a tiebreaker win over the Bears in 1924. Chicago won the series 4–3.

== Facilities ==
=== Headquarters ===
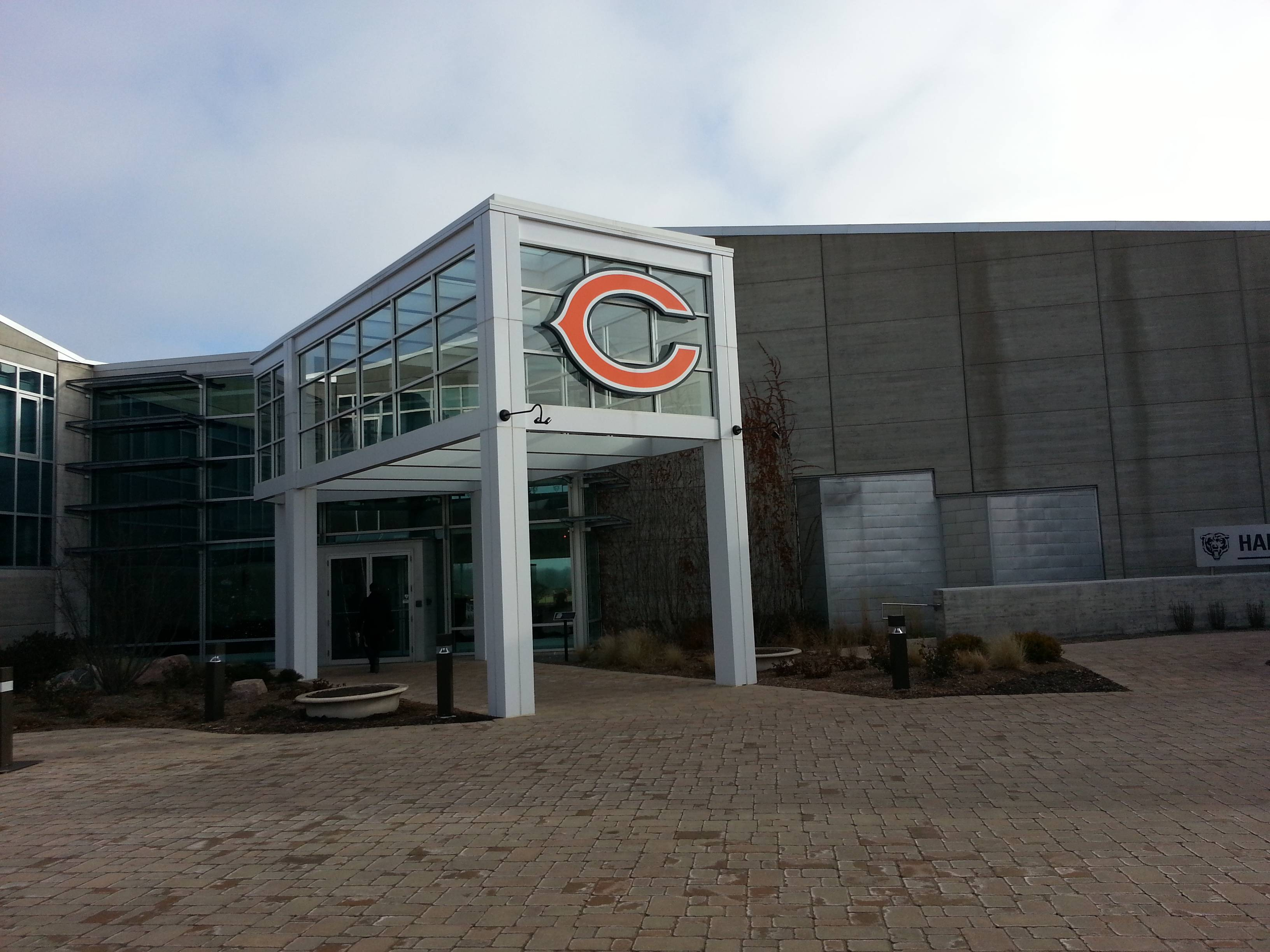
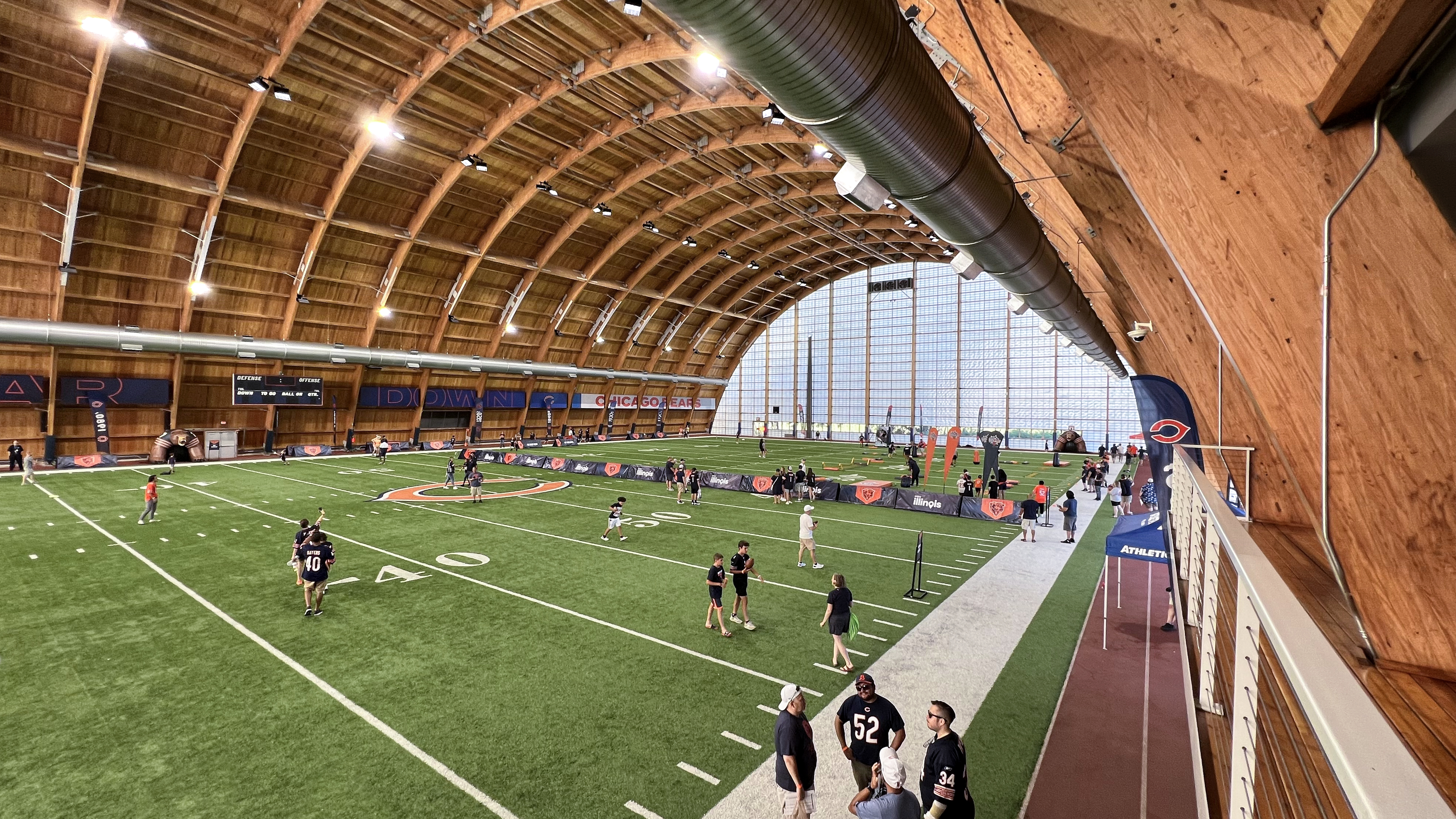
Halas Hall is the corporate headquarters and state-of-the-art training facility of the Bears. Located on a 38-acre campus in Lake Forest, Illinois, it serves as the central hub for the franchise's coaching, player development, scouting, and business operations.

The team headquarters, Halas Hall, named after founder George Halas, is located in the Chicago suburb of Lake Forest, Illinois. The Bears practice at adjoining facilities during the season. The location is 4 miles (6.4 km) west of the original Halas Hall, which had opened in 1977, and it was named after George Halas Jr., who had died unexpectedly in 1979. It was located at Lake Forest College and contained two practice fields (one regulation-size outdoor field, as well as a 70-yard practice field) and front office facilities, which is used by the Foresters Athletics Department.

On March 3, 1997, the 38-acre (15-hectare) complex opened. It was later expanded, in 2013 and 2018.

The team also has a 11,000 square feet (1,000 m^{2}) corporate office in downtown Chicago, located at 123 N. Wacker Dr, for sales, corporate partnerships, and events departments employees.

=== Stadium ===
==== History ====
Stadium	Location	Duration
Staley Field	Decatur, Illinois	1919–1920
Wrigley Field	Chicago, Illinois	1921–1970
Soldier Field	Chicago, Illinois	1971–2001, 2003–present
Memorial Stadium	Champaign, Illinois	2002

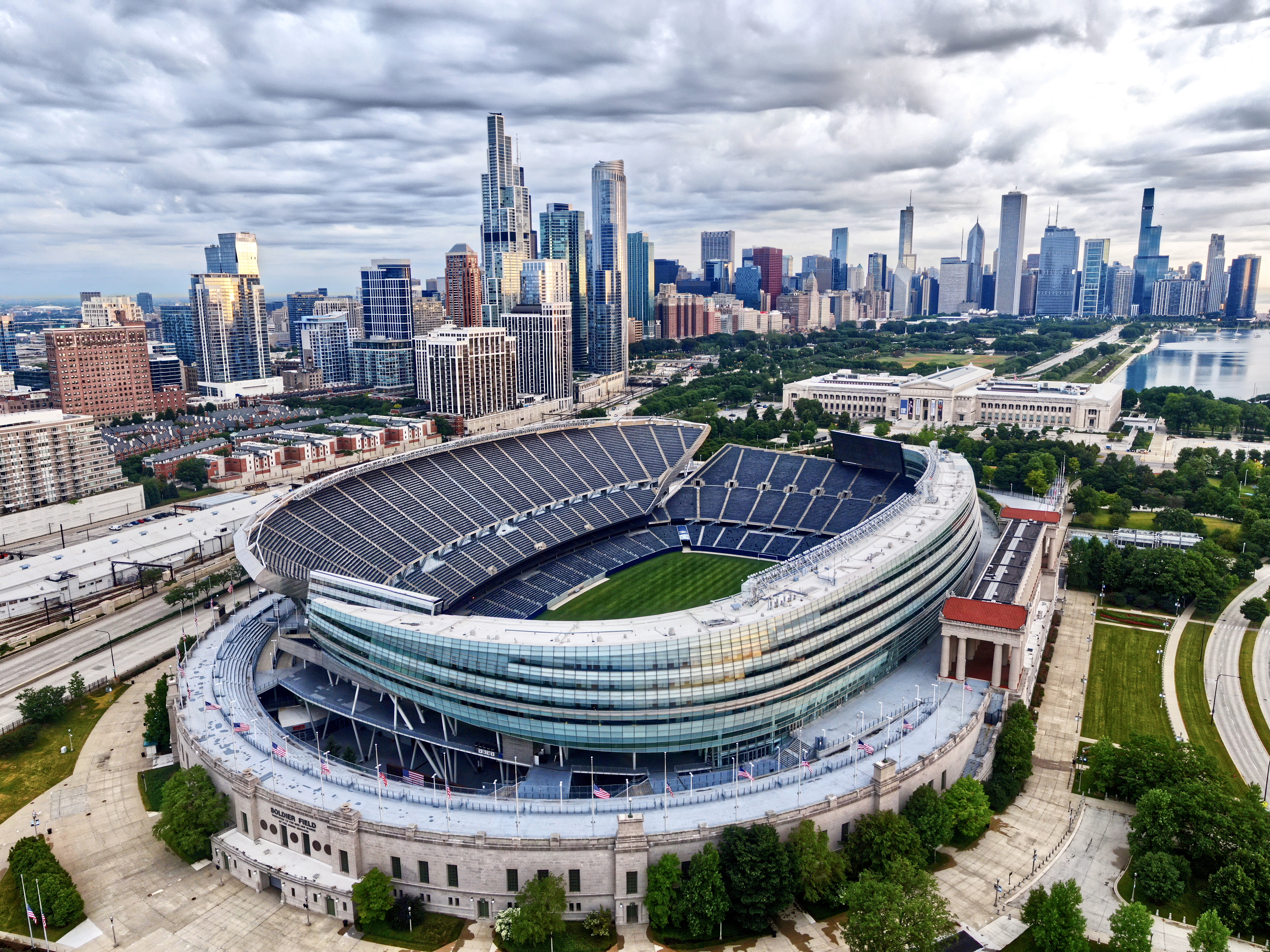
Soldier Field, located on Chicago's Near South Side, has served as the Bears' home stadium since 1971

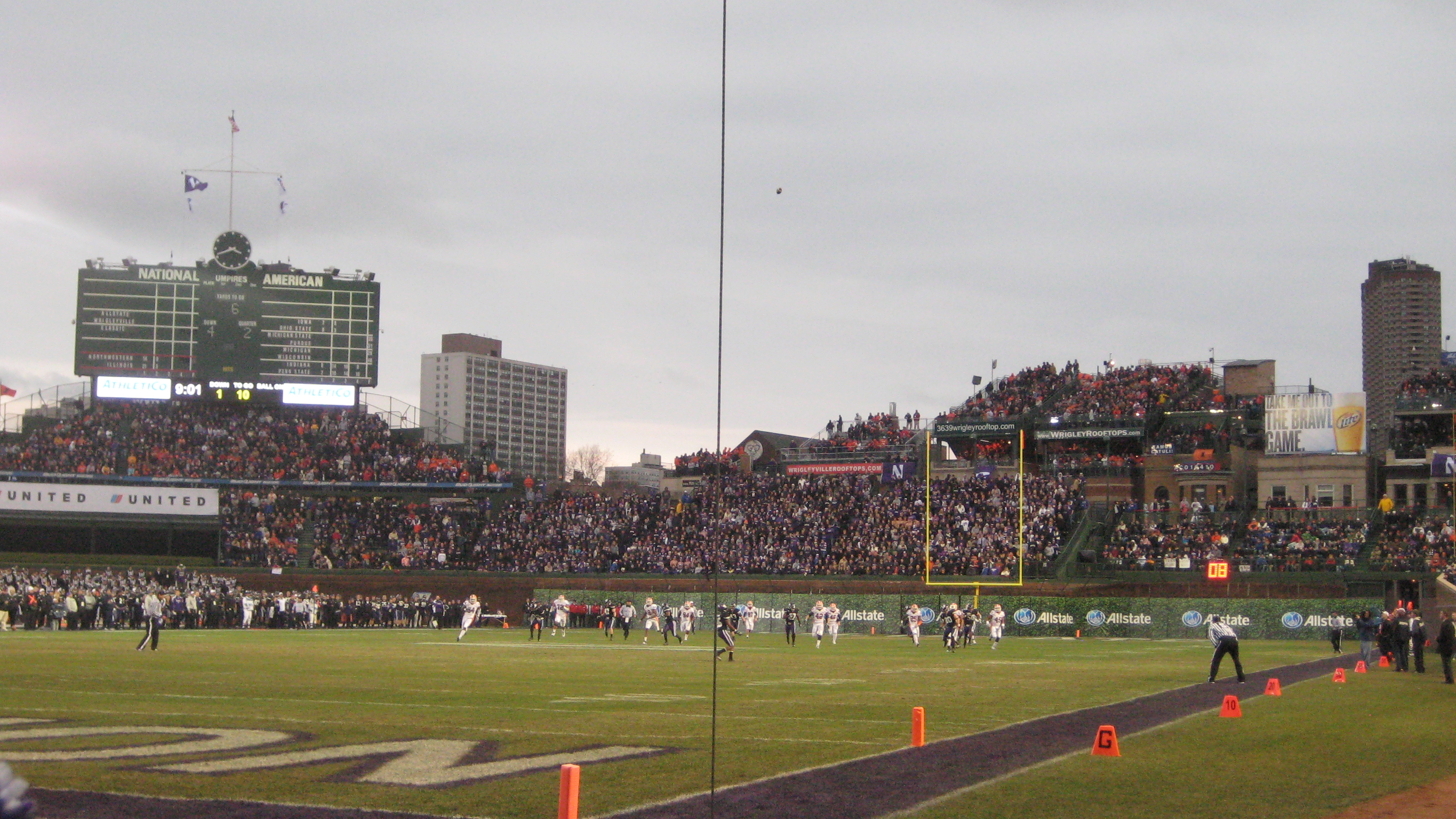
Wrigley Field (pictured in 2010), located on Chicago's North Side, served as the Bears' home stadium from 1921 to 1970

Soldier Field, located on Lake Shore Drive in Chicago, is the home of the Bears. The Bears moved to Soldier Field in 1971 after outgrowing Wrigley Field, the team's home for 50 years. After the AFL-NFL Merger, the league preferred their teams to play in stadiums that could hold at least 50,000 fans. Even with portable bleachers that the team set up at Wrigley, the stadium could still only hold 46,000. At first, the Bears were supposed to play at Dyche Stadium (later called Ryan Field), but Northwestern University's residential neighbors objected, and the agreement was cancelled. The original home of the Bears was Staley Field at Decatur, Illinois, when the team was known as the Decatur Staleys, before they moved to Chicago in 1921.

Soldier Field's playing surface was changed from natural grass to astroturf before the 1971 season, and then back to natural grass in time for the start of the 1988 season. Throughout its history, Soldier Field's field maintenance has been done by the Chicago Park District (the municipal entity from which the Bears lease the field) by disparate district employees, rather than a permanent team-employed grounds crew, generating some controversy among players for its rough surface. This arrangement caused disagreements with the city throughout the years, with the Bears attempting to agree on a new stadium since 1986. The stadium was the site of the infamous Fog Bowl playoff game between the Bears and Philadelphia Eagles.

In 2002, the stadium was closed and rebuilt with only the exterior wall being preserved. It was closed on Sunday, January 20, 2002, the day after the Bears lost in the playoffs. It reopened on September 27, 2003, after a complete rebuild (the second in the stadium's history). Many fans refer to the rebuilt stadium as "New Soldier Field". During the 2002 season, the Bears played their home games at the University of Illinois' Memorial Stadium in Champaign, where they went 3–5.

Multiple critics have negative views of the new stadium, believing that its structure has made it more of an eyesore than a landmark; some have dubbed it the "Mistake on the Lake". Soldier Field was stripped of its National Historic Landmark designation on February 17, 2006.

In the 2005 season, the Bears won the NFC North Division and the No. 2 Seed in the NFC playoffs, entitling them to play at least one home game in the postseason. The team hosted (and lost) their divisional round match on January 15, 2006, against the Carolina Panthers. This was the first playoff game at Soldier Field since the stadium reopened.

The stadium's end zones and midfield were unpainted until the 1982 season. The design sported on the field included the bolded word "Chicago" rendered in Highway Gothic in both end zones. In 1983, the end zone design returned, with the addition of a large wishbone "C" Bears logo painted at midfield. These field markings remained unchanged until the 1996 season. In 1996 the midfield wishbone "C" was changed to a large blue Bears head, and the end zone design were painted with "Bears" in cursive. This design remained until the 1999 season, when the artwork was returned to the classic "Chicago" and "C". In the new Soldier Field, the artwork was tweaked with the word "Chicago" bolded in one end zone and the other having "Bears".

In June 2021, the Bears submitted a bid to purchase the Arlington International Racecourse in Arlington Heights, Illinois from Churchill Downs. Despite negotiations between the city of Chicago to upgrade Soldier Field again, the Bears entered into an agreement with Churchill Downs to purchase the Arlington International Racecourse in September 2021 for $197.2 million. The sale of the property, which includes 326 acres (132 hectares) of space for potential development, closed on February 15, 2023.

In 2024, the Bears considered building a new stadium in the parking area south of Soldier Field on Museum Campus. The team revealed plans for a $4.7 billion domed lakefront stadium development. Due to a lack of public funding, the Bears informed Chicago mayor Brandon Johnson in May 2025 that they aimed to build a new stadium on the Arlington Heights property. Team president Kevin Warren repeated that the funding and public support were key challenges. On September 8, Warren confirmed the Bears are moving to Arlington Heights and intend to finalize stadium plans later in the year, which will not require state money. However, in December, Warren announced the Bears are expanding their stadium search beyond Illinois, including northwest Indiana, after years of failed negotiations with state lawmakers. He stated that Arlington Heights remains the best option in Cook County, but the team has been told their $5 billion stadium project would not be a priority for Illinois legislators in 2026. In February 2026, Indiana lawmakers approved an amendment to Indiana state bill 27 in an effort to entice the Bears to build a stadium in Hammond, Indiana. In June, the Bears' board of directors voted to continue developing a stadium project located in Hammond.

=== Training camp locations ===
Until 1930, the Staleys/Bears conducted their summer training camp in their home stadiums: Staley Field (Decatur, Illinois) and later Cubs' Park (Chicago).

In 1930, the Bears moved to Mills Stadium in Chicago. From 1931 to 1934, they moved successively to Loyola University Chicago, Logan Square Baseball Park, Notre Dame University, and Lane Tech College Prep High School.

In 1935, the Bears began a nine-year run of holding training camp at St. John's Northwestern Military Academy in Delafield, Wisconsin.

In 1944, the Bears moved to St. Joseph's College in Rensselaer, Indiana and stayed there for 30 years. On July 27, 1964, Bears players Willie Galimore and Bo Farrington were killed a few miles from the team's training camp when Galimore's Volkswagen left the road on a curve and rolled.

From 1975 to 1984, the Bears conducted their summer training camp in Lake Forest College, at the original Halas Hall (the practice and front office facility for the Bears from 1977 until 1997). The practice field was later renamed Farwell Field and serves as the main field for Foresters football and soccer.

From 1984 to 2001, the Bears held pre-season training camp in Ralph E. Davis Pioneer Stadium at University of Wisconsin–Platteville. They were considered a member of the "Cheese League", which in 1999 consisted of the Green Bay Packers, New Orleans Saints, and Kansas City Chiefs, with each team practicing at a different university in Wisconsin.

In 2001, the Illinois General Assembly asked the Bears to move to an Illinois practice facility to raise funds to remodel Soldier Field. Before the Bears left, they donated $250,000 (equivalent to $455,000 in 2025) to UW–Platteville for a new computer lab, which was named "The Bears Den".

On June 16, 2014, the UW–Platteville stadium was damaged by a tornado, and the Bears donated $50,000 (equivalent to $68,000 in 2025) to the school relief fund.

From 2002 to 2019, the Bears held their summer training camp at Olivet Nazarene University in Bourbonnais. Although the Bears had an agreement to continue practicing there through 2022, they moved the camp into the recently renovated Halas Hall in 2020.

== In popular culture ==
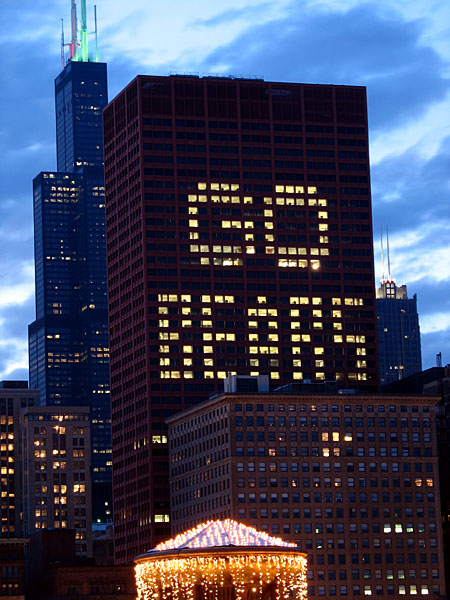
The CNA Center in Chicago flashes a "GO BEARS" window display before a Bears Sunday Night Football game in 2006.

The 1971 American TV movie Brian's Song starred Billy Dee Williams as Gale Sayers and James Caan as Brian Piccolo. The film told how Piccolo helped Sayers return to greatness on the field after a devastating knee injury, and how Sayers helped the Piccolo family through Brian's fatal illness. A 2001 remake of the movie for ABC starred Sean Maher as Piccolo and Mekhi Phifer as Sayers.

The Super Bowl XX champion Bears were a fixture of mainstream American pop culture in the 1980s. The 1985 team is also remembered for recording the song "The Super Bowl Shuffle", which reached number forty-one on the Billboard Hot 100 and was nominated for a Grammy Award. The music video for the song depicts the team rapping that they are "not here to start no trouble" but instead "just here to do the Super Bowl Shuffle". The team took a risk by recording and releasing the song before the playoffs had even begun, but were able to avoid embarrassment by going on to win Super Bowl XX by a then-record margin of 46–10. That game was one of the most-watched television events in history according to the Nielsen ratings system; the game had a rating of 48.3, ranking it seventh in all-time television history.

The Bears' success in the 1980s – and especially the personality of head coach Mike Ditka – inspired a recurring sketch on the American sketch comedy program Saturday Night Live, called "Bill Swerski's Superfans". The sketch featured Cheers co-star George Wendt, a Chicago native, as host of a radio talk-show (similar in tone to WGN radio's "The Sportswriters"), with co-panelists Carl Wollarski (Robert Smigel), Pat Arnold (Mike Myers) and Todd O'Connor (Chris Farley). To hear them tell it, "Da Bears" and Coach Ditka could do no wrong. The sketch stopped after Ditka was fired in 1993. The sketch usually showed the panelists chugging beer and eating lots of Polish sausage, and often featured Todd getting so agitated about what was happening with the Bears that he suffered a heart attack, but quickly recovered (through self-administered CPR). The sketch also features the cast predicting unrealistic blowout victories for Bears games. Da Super Fan sketch has not been brought back by SNL, with the exception of a single appearance by Horatio Sanz as a Super Fan for the Cubs on "Weekend Update" in 2003. Outside of SNL, George Wendt reprised his role of Swerski in the opening promo of Super Bowl XL on ABC.

On TV shows based in Chicago such as The Bob Newhart Show, Married... with Children, Family Matters, Still Standing, According to Jim, Early Edition and The Bernie Mac Show, the main characters are all Bears fans, and have worn Bears' jerseys and T-shirts on some occasions. Some episodes even show them watching Bears games. Roseanne is another TV show based in Illinois (albeit not in Chicago itself) to feature the Bears as the consensus household favorite, as Dan Connor, played by John Goodman, is seen wearing Bears hats in several episodes. That '70s Show featured several Bears references, as it was based in Wisconsin, home of the Packers. On one episode while the gang is at a Bears vs. Packers game, Eric comes to the seat in a Walter Payton jersey and is booed by the surrounding Packers fans. In an episode of the Disney Channel show Shake It Up, based in Chicago, recurring character Dina Garcia (Ainsley Bailey) sold scalped Chicago Bears tickets. More recently, Modern Family character Cameron Tucker has been shown as a Bears fan. In an episode of the Disney Channel show "I Didn't Do It", based in Chicago, Lindy Watson (Olivia Holt) and Logan Watson (Austin North) try to get a football signed by NFL Hall of Famer Dick Butkus after destroying their fathers Butkus signed ball, Alshon Jeffery also makes a cameo appearance as well.

Ditka's success and popularity in Chicago has led him to land analyst roles on various American football pregame shows. Ditka worked for both the NFL on NBC and CBS's The NFL Today, and he currently works on ESPN's Sunday NFL Countdown and provided Friday night analysis on the Bears on WBBM-TV's 2 on Football with former WBBM-TV sports director Mark Malone. He is also the color analyst for all local broadcasts of Bears preseason games. Ditka also co-starred himself alongside actor Will Ferrell in the 2005 comedy film Kicking & Screaming.

Also, Ditka, Dick Butkus, Walter Payton, Jim McMahon, William "Refrigerator" Perry and Brian Urlacher are among Bears figures known for their appearances in TV commercials. Urlacher, whose jersey was among the league's best-selling in 2002, was featured on Nike commercials with former Atlanta Falcons quarterback Michael Vick.

In the 1961 Hanna-Barbera animated short "Rah Rah Bear", Yogi Bear helps the Bears beat the New York Giants. The Bears were later depicted in an episode of the 1985 cartoon version of the NBC sitcom Punky Brewster, where the Bears are playing the Green Bay Packers.

Clark Griswold (Chevy Chase) from the National Lampoon's Vacation series appears in some scenes wearing a navy blue with burnt orange scripting Chicago Bears ball cap. He wears the same Chicago Bears cap throughout all four Vacation movies.

== Broadcast media ==
=== Radio ===
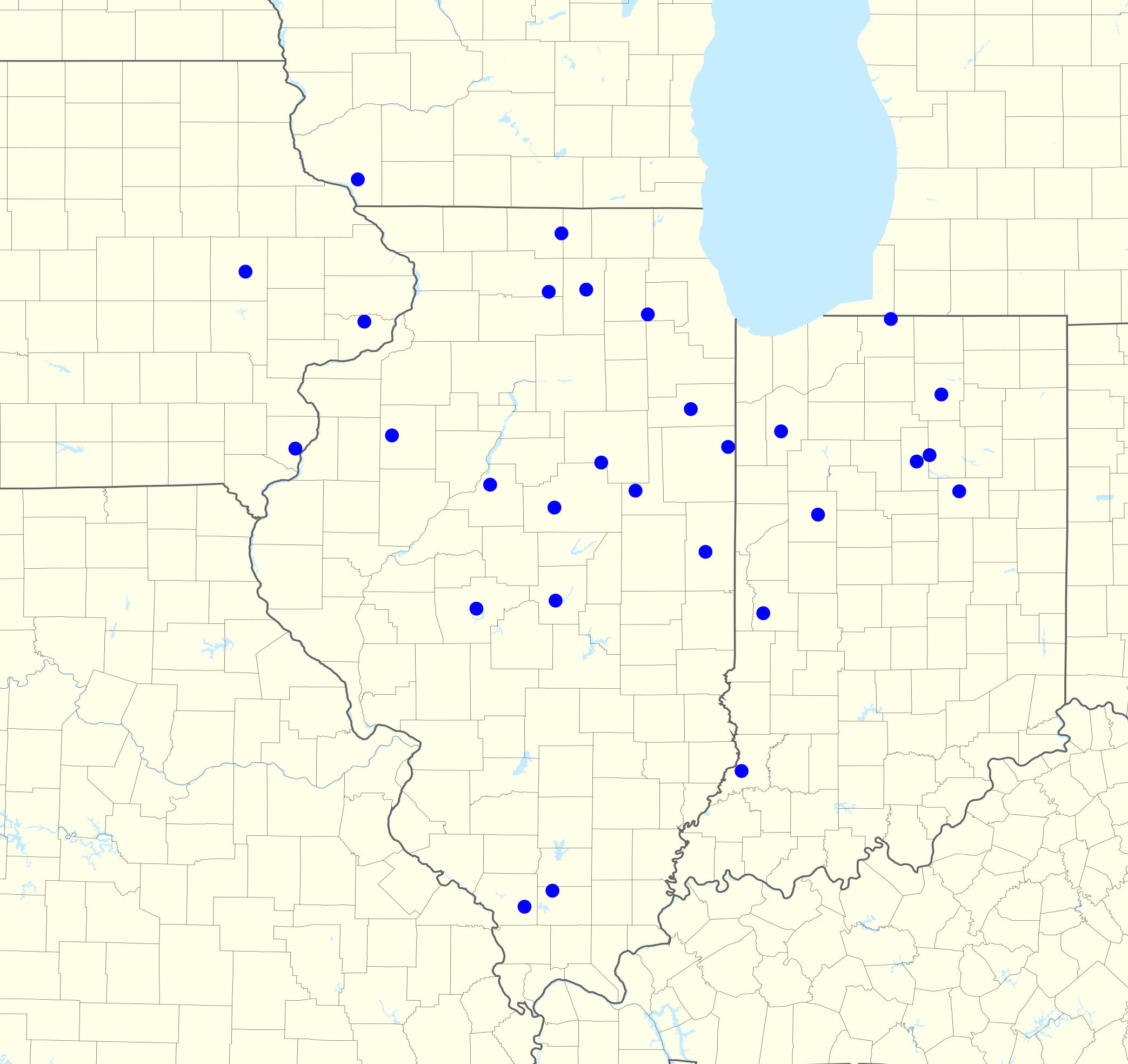
Map of radio affiliates by tower location, thus WBBM's location in the western suburbs of Chicago

Currently, WMVP (1000 AM) broadcast Bears games with Jeff Joniak doing the play-by-play, along with color commentator Tom Thayer, who played for the Bears from 1985 to 1992. Over the years, many Bears play-by-play broadcasters have included play-by-play announcers Jack Brickhouse, Joe McConnell and Wayne Larrivee, and color commentators Hub Arkush, Dick Butkus, Jim Hart and Irv Kupcinet.

Spanish radio station WLEY-FM aired the Bears games from 2012 to 2014. Since 2015, WRTO and WVIV-FM air Bears games in Spanish.

Chicago Bears network radio affiliates
Market	Station	Notes
Chicago	WMVP (1000 AM)	All games Bears Insider; Bears All-Access
Chicago	WRTO (1200 AM) / WVIV-FM (93.5 FM)	All games (in Spanish)

=== Television ===
Preseason games air on WFLD (channel 32). The announcers are Adam Amin (play-by-play), Jim Miller (color commentary) and Lou Canellis (sideline reporter). WFLD also carries the majority of the team's regular season games through the NFL on Fox. Any Bears home games against AFC teams are aired on the CBS O&O station, WBBM-TV, which was the Bears' unofficial "home" station from 1956 until Fox won the NFC rights in 1995. Sunday Night games are broadcast on WMAQ-TV, the NBC O&O station, with ESPN Monday Night Football games airing either on ESPN or WLS-TV, the ABC affiliate.

Chicago Bears network television affiliates
Market	Station	Notes
Regional cable	Marquee Sports Network	Bear Essentials; Bears Den; The Official Bears Postgame Live
Chicago	WFLD	Preseason and Fox regional/national games Bears Gameday Live; Bears Gamenight Live
Cedar Rapids, Iowa	KFXA	Preseason and Fox regional/national games
Champaign–Urbana	WCCU	Preseason and Fox regional/national games
Peoria	WMBD-TV	Preseason and CBS regional/national games
Quad Cities	KLJB	Preseason and Fox regional/national games
Rockford	WIFR	Preseason and CBS regional/national games
Rockford	WQRF	Preseason and Fox regional/national games
Springfield	WRSP-TV	Preseason and Fox regional/national games
South Bend	WSBT-TV	Preseason and CBS regional/national games

== Statistics and records ==
Patrick Mannelly holds the record for the most seasons in a Bears uniform with 16. On the other hand, Steve McMichael holds the record for most consecutive games played by a Bear with 191; he accomplished the feat from 1981 to 1993. In second place is Payton, who played 186 games from 1975 to 1987 at running back, a position considered to be conducive to injury, only missing one game in a span of 13 seasons.

Kicker Robbie Gould became the Bears' all-time scoring leader in Week 5 of 2015 season overtaking placekicker Kevin Butler who previously held the club record for scoring the most points in his ten-year Bear career. He scored 1,116 points as the Bears kicker from 1985 to 1995. He is followed by running back Walter Payton, with 750 points. Payton holds the team record for career rushing yards with 16,726. That was an NFL record until Emmitt Smith of the Dallas Cowboys broke it in 2002. Former Bears running back Matt Forte, who started playing for the Bears in 2008, is the closest to Payton's record with 6,985 yards. Forte also holds the team's single season record for rookies in rushing attempts, rushing yards and receptions. Mark Bortz holds the record for most Bear playoff appearances, with 13 between 1983 and 1994, and is followed by Kevin Butler, Dennis Gentry, Dan Hampton, Jay Hilgenberg, Steve McMichael, Ron Rivera, Mike Singletary, and Keith Van Horne, who have each played in 12 playoff games.

The 1940 Chicago Bears team holds the record for the biggest margin of victory in an NFL game, including both playoff and regular season games, with a 73–0 victory over the Washington Redskins in the 1940 NFL Championship Game. The largest home victory for the Bears came in a 61–7 result against the Green Bay Packers in 1980. The largest defeat in club history was a 52–0 loss against the Baltimore Colts in 1964. The club recorded undefeated regular seasons in 1934 and 1942; unlike the 1972 Miami Dolphins, however, they did not win the championship game in either season. In 1934, the club completed a 13–0 record but were defeated by the New York Giants, and in 1942 the club completed an 11–0 record but were defeated by the Redskins. Had the Bears won either championship, the club would have completed a championship three-peat – a feat completed only by the Packers (twice), although no team has done it since the AFL-NFL merger. Halas holds the team record for coaching the most seasons with 40 and for having the most career victories of 324. Halas' victories record stood until Don Shula surpassed Halas in 1993. Ditka is the closest Bears coach to Halas, with 112 career victories. No other Bears coach has recorded over 100 victories with the team.

During the 2006 season, return specialist Devin Hester set several kick return records. He currently holds the franchise record for most return yards with 2,261. He had six touchdown returns, setting a record for most returns in a single season. In 2007, he recorded another six touchdown season from returns. One of the most notable of these returns came on November 12, 2006, when he returned a missed field goal for a 108-yard touchdown. The record tied former teammate Nathan Vasher's previous record, which was set almost a year earlier. Hester set a Super Bowl record as the first player to return an opening kick of a Super Bowl for a touchdown. On December 20, 2010, Hester set an NFL record for most touchdowns on a punt or kickoff return with his 14th career return coming against the Minnesota Vikings. In 2011, Hester broke the record for the most punt returns against the Carolina Panthers.

In 2012, Charles Tillman set the record for most forced fumbles in a single game with four against the Tennessee Titans. Against the Titans, Chicago became the first team in league history to score a touchdown pass, a touchdown run, an interception return for a touchdown, and a blocked kick/punt for a score in the same quarter. Tillman and teammate Lance Briggs became the first pair in NFL history to return an interception for a touchdown in consecutive games against the Jacksonville Jaguars and Dallas Cowboys.

=== Season-by-season results ===
This is a partial list of the Bears' last five completed seasons. For the full season-by-season franchise results, see List of Chicago Bears seasons.

Note: The finish, wins, losses, and ties columns list regular season results and exclude any postseason play.

Super Bowl champions (1970–present)	Conference champions	Division champions	Wild Card berth

As of January 28, 2025

Season	Team	League	Conference	Division	Regular season				Postseason results	Awards
Season	Team	League	Conference	Division	Finish	Wins	Losses	Ties	Postseason results	Awards
2021	2021	NFL	NFC	North	3rd	6	11	0	—	—
2022	2022	NFL	NFC	North	4th	3	14	0	—	—
2023	2023	NFL	NFC	North	4th	7	10	0	—	—
2024	2024	NFL	NFC	North	4th	5	12	0	—	—
2025	2025	NFL	NFC	North	1st	11	6	0	Won against Green Bay Packers in NFC Wild Card Round. Lost to Los Angeles Rams in NFC Divisional Round.	—

=== Records ===
All-time Bears leaders
Leader	Player	Record	Years with Bears
Passing	Jay Cutler	23,443 passing yards	2009–2016
Rushing	Walter Payton	16,726 rushing yards	1975–1987
Receiving	Johnny Morris	5,059 receiving yards	1958–1967
Points	Robbie Gould	1,142 points	2005–2015
Coaching Wins	George Halas	318 wins	1920–1929, 1933–1942; 1946–1955, 1958–1967

== Players of note ==
=== Current roster ===
Chicago Bears roster
**Quarterbacks (QB)**: 17 Tyson Bagent; 11 Case Keenum; 18 Caleb Williams; **Running backs (RB)**: 23 Roschon Johnson; 25 Kyle Monangai; 4 D'Andre Swift; **Wide receivers (WR)**: 10 Luther Burden III; 15 Rome Odunze; 14 Kalif Raymond; 13 Zavion Thomas; 9 Jahdae Walker; **Tight ends (TE)**: 88 Stephen Carlson; 84 Colston Loveland; 87 Sam Roush	**Offensive linemen (OL)**: 79 Theo Benedet T; 67 Garrett Bradbury C; 73 Jonah Jackson G; 54 Logan Jones C; 74 Jordan McFadden G; 65 Luke Newman G; 62 Joe Thuney G; 75 Ozzy Trapilo T; 58 Darnell Wright T; **Defensive linemen (DL)**: 94 Austin Booker DE; 90 Neville Gallimore DT; 92 Daniel Hardy DE; 50 Grady Jarrett DT; 91 Jayden Loving DT; 97 James Lynch DT; 99 Jeffery Simmons DT; 98 Montez Sweat DE; 95 Shemar Turner DT; 96 Jordan van den Berg DT	**Linebackers (LB)**: 12 Devin Bush Jr.; 53 T. J. Edwards; 49 Keyshaun Elliott; 48 D'Marco Jackson; 57 Jack Sanborn; 44 Noah Sewell; **Defensive backs (DB)**: 39 Josh Blackwell CB; 6 Kyler Gordon CB; 22 Elijah Hicks S; 1 Jaylon Johnson CB; 21 Cam Lewis S; 24 Malik Muhammad CB; 20 Clark Phillips III CB; 29 Tyrique Stevenson CB; 31 Dillon Thieneman S; 38 Skyler Thomas S; **Special teams (ST)**: 46 Scott Daly LS; 8 Cairo Santos K; 19 Tory Taylor P	**Practice squad**: 36 Salvon Ahmed RB; 76 Caden Barnett G; 68 Earnest Brown IV DT; 26 Josh Butler CB; 81 Kaden Davis WR; 32 KC Eziomume CB; 45 Beau Gardner LS; 80 Qadir Ismail TE; 47 Buddy Johnson LB; 72 Christian Jones T; 37 Elijah Jones CB; 35 Wayne Matthews LB; 82 Scotty Miller WR; 16 Miller Moss QB; 83 JP Richardson WR; 33 Keidron Smith S; **Reserve**: 38 Brittain Brown RB (IR); 2 Coby Bryant S (IR); 43 Tony Fields II LB (IR); 70 Braxton Jones T (IR); 86 Nikola Kalinic TE (IR); 85 Cole Kmet TE (IR); 43 Hayden Large TE (IR); 55 Dayo Odeyingbo DE (IR); 30 Zavier Scott RB (IR); 46 Nephi Sewell LB (IR); 93 Kentavius Street DT (IR) 52 active, 16 practice squad, 11 reserve As of November 5, 2026. Rookies in italics.; Roster; Depth chart; Transactions

=== Pro Football Hall of Famers ===
In the Pro Football Hall of Fame, 32 members earned their credentials primarily as Bears, more than any other team. The club also has had nine Hall of Famers spend a minor portion of their career with the franchise. Founder, owner, head coach, and player George Halas, fullback Bronko Nagurski, and Red Grange were a part of the original class of inductees in 1963. The franchise saw 14 individuals inducted into the Hall of Fame from 1963 to 1967. The most recent Bears to be inducted were Devin Hester and Steve McMichael in 2024 (primary contributors) and Jared Allen (minor contributor) in 2025.

In addition, five Bears players were enshrined in Helms Athletic Foundation Pro Football Hall of Fame, which was established in 1950 and preceded the Pro Football Hall of Fame, but as of 2025 were not enshrined in the Pro Football Hall of Fame. The list includes primary contributors Ray Bray (class of 1959), Fred Williams (1967) and Jack Manders (1969). Minor contributors includes Jim Benton (1960) and Jon Arnett (1967).

=== Chicagoland Sports Hall of Fame ===
The Chicagoland Sports Hall of Fame was founded in 1979 and honors sports greats associated with the Chicago metropolitan area. As of 2023, there are 59 honorees enshrined in the hall with connection to the Bears.

=== Retired numbers ===
The Bears have retired 14 uniform numbers, which is the most in the NFL, and ranks fourth behind the basketball Boston Celtics (23), baseball New York Yankees (21), and hockey Montreal Canadiens (15) for the most in major professional sports leagues in the United States and Canada. The Bears retired Mike Ditka's number 89 jersey on December 9, 2013. It is the last number that the Bears retired.

**Chicago Bears retired numbers**

**Bronko Nagurski**; FB/LB/T; 1930–1937, 1943; Minnesota

**George McAfee**; RB/DB/PR; 1940–1941, 1945–1950; Duke

**George Halas**; End/HC; Owner/Founder; 1920–1983; Illinois

**Willie Galimore**; RB; 1957–1963; Florida A&M

**Walter Payton**; RB; 1975–1987; Jackson State

**Gale Sayers**; RB/KR; 1965–1971; Kansas

**Brian Piccolo**; RB/FB; 1965–1969; Wake Forest

**Sid Luckman**; QB/DB/P; 1939–1950; Columbia

**Dick Butkus**; MLB; 1965–1973; Illinois

**Bill Hewitt**; End; 1932–1936; Michigan

**Bill George**; MG/MLB; 1952–1965; Wake Forest

**Clyde Turner**; C/LB; 1940–1952; Hardin-Simmons

**Red Grange**; RB/DB; 1925, 1929–1934; Illinois

**Mike Ditka**; TE; 1961–1966; Pittsburgh

=== 100 greatest Bears list ===
In honor of the team's centennial anniversary, on May 20, 2019, the Chicago Bears unveiled the Top 100 players in franchise history, as voted on by Hall of Fame writers Don Pierson and Dan Pompei, two prominent journalists who covered the club. The list included 27 Pro Football Hall of Famers when it was released; Jim Covert and Ed Sprinkle joined the hall in the same year as part of the 2020 Centennial class.

Four then-active players made the list: safety Eddie Jackson (96), defensive lineman Akiem Hicks (75), offensive lineman Kyle Long (74), and Khalil Mack (60), who had only played one season with the team at the time. Long would retire the following year.

Chicagobears.com later released "Top 10: Best of the rest", a list of the "top 10 snubs" from the centennial list: Alex Brown, Thomas Jones, Dave Whitsell, Curtis Conway, Tim Jennings, Leslie Frazier, Roberto Garza, Marty Booker, Nathan Vasher and William Perry. Pompei would later say that the last two players who did not make the list were Brown and Frazier.

#	Name	Position	Years
1	Walter Payton^{𝙝𝙤𝙛}	RB	1975–1987
2	Dick Butkus^{𝙝𝙤𝙛}	LB	1965–1973
3	Bronko Nagurski^{𝙝𝙤𝙛}	FB/LB/T	1930–1937, 1943
4	Sid Luckman^{𝙝𝙤𝙛}	QB/P/DB	1939–1950
5	Gale Sayers^{𝙝𝙤𝙛}	RB	1965–1971
6	Mike Ditka^{𝙝𝙤𝙛}	TE	1961–1966
7	Bill George^{𝙝𝙤𝙛}	LB	1952–1965
8	Clyde "Bulldog" Turner^{𝙝𝙤𝙛}	C/LB	1940–1952
9	Doug Atkins^{𝙝𝙤𝙛}	DE	1955–1966
10	Danny Fortmann^{𝙝𝙤𝙛}	OG	1936–1943
11	Dan Hampton^{𝙝𝙤𝙛}	DE/DT	1979–1990
12	Richard Dent^{𝙝𝙤𝙛}	DE	1983–1993, 1995
13	Jim Covert^{𝙝𝙤𝙛}	OT	1983–1990
14	Brian Urlacher^{𝙝𝙤𝙛}	LB	2000–2012
15	Mike Singletary^{𝙝𝙤𝙛}	LB	1981–1992
16	Bill Hewitt^{𝙝𝙤𝙛}	E	1932–1936
17	Stan Jones^{𝙝𝙤𝙛}	OG/DT	1954–1965
18	Jay Hilgenberg^{vg}	C/LS	1981–1991
19	Steve McMichael^{𝙝𝙤𝙛}	DT	1981–1993
20	Devin Hester^{𝙝𝙤𝙛}	KR/PR/WR	2006–2013
21	Joe Stydahar^{𝙝𝙤𝙛}	OT	1936–1942; 1945–1946
22	George Connor^{𝙝𝙤𝙛}	T/LB	1948–1955
23	George McAfee^{𝙝𝙤𝙛}	HB/DB	1940–1941; 1945–1950
24	Joe Fortunato^{vg}	LB	1955–1966
25	Ed Sprinkle^{𝙝𝙤𝙛}	DE	1944–1955
26	Ed Healey^{𝙝𝙤𝙛}	OT/DT	1922–1927
27	Olin Kreutz	C	1998–2010
28	Lance Briggs	LB	2003–2014
29	Rick Casares^{vg}	FB	1955–1964
30	Gary Fencik	S	1976–1987
31	Charles Tillman	CB	2003–2014
32	Paddy Driscoll^{𝙝𝙤𝙛}	HB/QB/P	1920, 1926–1929
33	George Trafton^{𝙝𝙤𝙛}	C	1920–1932
34	Matt Forte	RB	2008–2015
35	George Musso^{𝙝𝙤𝙛}	OG	1933–1944
36	Red Grange^{𝙝𝙤𝙛}	HB/DB	1925, 1929–1934
37	George Halas^{𝙝𝙤𝙛}	E	1920–1929
38	Link Lyman^{𝙝𝙤𝙛}	T	1926–1928; 1930–1931; 1933–1934
39	Harlon Hill^{vg}	FL	1954–1961
40	Ken Kavanaugh^{vg}	E	1940–1941; 1945–1950
41	Neal Anderson	RB	1986–1993
42	Richie Petitbon^{vg}	S	1959–1968
43	Wilber Marshall	LB	1984–1987
44	Johnny Morris	FL	1958–1967
45	Otis Wilson	LB	1980–1987
46	Doug Buffone	LB	1966–1979
47	Dave Duerson	S	1983–1989
48	Fred Williams^{HAF}	DT	1952–1963
49	Ray Bray^{HAF}	OG	1939–1942; 1946–1951
50	Mark Bortz	OG	1983–1994

#	Name	Position	Years
51	Keith Van Horne	OT	1981–1993
52	Joe Kopcha	OG	1929, 1932–1935
53	Jim McMahon	QB	1982–1988
54	Ed Brown	QB/P	1954–1961
55	Johnny Lujack	QB/DB	1948–1951
56	Roosevelt Taylor	CB	1961–1969
57	Jim Osborne	DT	1972–1984
58	Wally Chambers	DT	1973–1977
59	Julius Peppers^{𝙝𝙤𝙛}	DE	2010–2013
60	Khalil Mack	LB	2018–2021
61	Willie Galimore^{𝐟}	HB	1957–1963
62	Robbie Gould	K	2005–2015
63	Mike Brown	S	2000–2008
64	James "Big Cat" Williams	OT	1991–2002
65	Dick Gordon	WR	1965–1971
66	Mike Hartenstine	DE	1975–1986
67	Ed O'Bradovich	DE	1962–1971
68	Dick Barwegen	OG	1950–1952
69	Bill Wade	QB	1961–1966
70	Matt Suhey	FB	1980–1989
71	Kevin Butler	K	1985–1995
72	Mark Carrier	S	1990–1996
73	Tommie Harris	DT	2004–2010
74	Kyle Long	OG	2013–2019
75	Akiem Hicks	DT	2016–2021
76	J.C. Caroline	DB	1956–1965
77	Bennie McRae	DB	1962–1970
78	Donnell Woolford	CB	1989–1996
79	Dennis McKinnon	WR/KR	1983–1985; 1987–1989
80	Alshon Jeffery	WR	2012–2016
81	Brandon Marshall	WR	2012–2014
82	George Blanda^{𝙝𝙤𝙛}	QB/K	1949–1958
83	Willie Gault	WR	1983–1987
84	Tom Thayer	OG	1985–1992
85	Jay Cutler	QB	2009–2016
86	Allan Ellis	CB	1973–1977; 1979–1980
87	Luke Johnsos	E	1929–1936
88	Joey Sternaman	QB/HB/K	1922–1925; 1927–1930
89	Mike Pyle	C	1961–1969
90	Beattie Feathers^{𝐟}	HB	1934–1937
91	Bob Wetoska	OT	1960–1969
92	Bill Osmanski	FB	1939–1943; 1946–1947
93	Herm Lee	OT	1958–1966
94	Jim Dooley	FL/DB	1952–1954; 1956–1957; 1959–1962
95	Larry Morris	LB	1959–1965
96	Eddie Jackson	S	2017–2023
97	Bobby Joe Green	P	1962–1973
98	Trace Armstrong	DE	1989–1994
99	Doug Plank	S	1975–1982
100	Patrick Mannelly	LS	1998–2013

^{𝙝𝙤𝙛} Pro Football Hall of Fame inductee.
^{𝐟} Pro Football Hall of Fame finalist.
^{HAF} Helms Athletic Foundation Pro Football Hall of Fame inductee. (Note: The Helms Athletic Foundation Hall of Fame was established in 1950 and elected members until 1976. It preceded the Pro Football Hall of Fame by 13 years.)
^{vg} PFRA Hall of Very Good inductee.

=== All-Time Team ===
During the week of June 3, 2019, the All-Time Team was announced in parts each day starting with the All-Time defensive players, followed by the All-Time specialists and then the All-Time offensive players. Bold indicates those elected to the Pro Football Hall of Fame.

Larry Mayer of the Chicagobears.com would later state, that according to the voters "if they had included a long-snapper on the team it would have been Patrick Mannelly".

==== Offense ====
Position	Player	Tenure	Honors*
QB	**Sid Luckman**	1939–1950	4× NFL champion (1940, 1941, 1943, 1946); NFL Most Valuable Player (1943); NFL 1940s All-Decade Team; Chicago Bears No. 42 retired
FB	**Bronko Nagurski**	1930–1937, 1943	3× NFL champion (1932, 1933, 1943); NFL 1930s All-Decade Team; NFL 75th Anniversary All-Time Team; Chicago Bears No. 3 retired
RB	**Walter Payton**	1975–1987	Super Bowl champion (XX); 2× NFL Most Valuable Player (1977, 1985); NFL 1970s All-Decade Team; NFL 1980s All-Decade Team; NFL 75th Anniversary All-Time Team; NFL 100th Anniversary All-Time Team; Chicago Bears No. 34 retired
WR	Harlon Hill	1954–1961	NFL MVP (1955)
WR	Ken Kavanaugh	1940–1941, 1945–1950	3× NFL champion (1940, 1941, 1946); NFL 1940s All-Decade Team
TE	**Mike Ditka**	1961–1966	NFL champion (1963); NFL 75th Anniversary All-Time Team; NFL 100th Anniversary All-Time Team; Chicago Bears No. 89 retired
OT	**Joe Stydahar**	1936–1942, 1945–1946	3x NFL champion (1940, 1942, 1946); NFL 1930s All-Decade Team
OT	**Jim Covert**	1983–1990	Super Bowl champion (XX); NFL 1980s All-Decade Team
G	**Stan Jones**	1954–1965	NFL champion (1963); Sporting News 1950s All-Decade Team
G	**Danny Fortmann**	1936–1943	3× NFL champion (1940, 1941, 1943); NFL 1930s All-Decade Team; Sports Illustrated 1940s All-Decade Team; NFL 100th Anniversary All-Time Team
C	**Clyde "Bulldog" Turner**	1940–1952	4× NFL champion (1940, 1941, 1943, 1946); NFL 1940s All-Decade Team; Chicago Bears No. 66 retired

==== Defense ====
Position	Player	Tenure	Honors*
DE	**Doug Atkins**	1955–1966	NFL champion (1963); NFL 1960s All-Decade Team; NFL 100th Anniversary All-Time Team
DE	**Richard Dent**	1983–1993, 1995	Super Bowl champion (XX); Super Bowl MVP (XX)
DT	**Dan Hampton**	1979–1990	Super Bowl champion (XX); NFL 1980s All-Decade Team
DT	**Steve McMichael**	1981–1993	Super Bowl champion (XX); PFR 1980s All-Decade Team
MLB	**Dick Butkus**	1965–1973	2× NFL Defensive Player of the Year (1969, 1970); NFL 1960s All-Decade Team; NFL 1970s All-Decade Team; NFL 75th Anniversary All-Time Team; NFL 100th Anniversary All-Time Team; Chicago Bears No. 51 retired
OLB	**George Connor**	1948–1955	NFL 1940s All-Decade Team
OLB	Joe Fortunato	1955–1966	NFL champion (1963); NFL 1950s All-Decade Team
CB	**George McAfee**	1940–1941, 1945–1950	3× NFL champion (1940, 1941, 1946); NFL 1940s All-Decade Team; Chicago Bears No. 5 retired
CB	Charles Tillman	2003–2014	NFL Man of the Year (2013)
S	Gary Fencik	1976–1987	Super Bowl champion (XX); PFR 1980s All-Decade Team
S	Richie Petitbon	1959–1968	NFL champion (1963)

==== Special teams ====
Position	Player	Tenure	Honors*
P	Bobby Joe Green	1962–1973	
PK	Robbie Gould	2005–2015	
PR	**Devin Hester**	2006–2013	3× Special Teams Player of the Year (2006, 2007, 2010); NFL 2000s All-Decade Team (PR); NFL 2010s All-Decade Team (KR); NFL 100th Anniversary All-Time Team
KR	**Gale Sayers**	1965–1971	NFL 1960s All-Decade Team; NFL 50th Anniversary All-Time Team; NFL 75th Anniversary All-Time Team; NFL 100th Anniversary All-Time Team; Chicago Bears No. 40 retired

^{*} As a Chicago Bear

== Coaching staff ==
Chicago Bears staff
Front office: Chairman – George McCaskey; President/CEO – Kevin Warren; General manager – Ryan Poles; Assistant general manager – Jeff King; Vice president of football administration – Matt Feinstein; Senior director of player personnel – Trey Koziol; Director of player personnel – Breck Ackley; Assistant director of college scouting – Francis St. Paul; Director of pro scouting – DJ Hord; Football administration and analytics manager – Andrea Wright; Head coaches: Head coach – Ben Johnson; Assistant head coach/wide receivers – Antwaan Randle El; Offensive coaches: Offensive coordinator – Press Taylor; Quarterbacks – J. T. Barrett; Running backs – Eric Studesville; Tight ends – Jim Dray; Offensive line – Dan Roushar; Assistant offensive line – Kyle DeVan; Offensive analyst – Will Lawing; Offensive assistant - quarterbacks & tight ends – Robbie Picazo; Offensive quality control – Matt Aponte; Offensive quality control – Isaiah Ford	Defensive coaches: Defensive coordinator – Dennis Allen; Defensive line – Jeremy Garrett; Linebackers – Richard Smith; Assistant linebackers – Kevin Koch; Defensive backs/passing game coordinator – Al Harris; Assistant defensive backs/safeties – Matt Giordano; Senior defensive assistant – Bill Johnson; Defensive assistant/nickels – Cannon Matthews; Defensive quality control – Zach Cable; Defensive quality control – Kenny Norton III; Special teams coaches: Special teams coordinator – Richard Hightower; Assistant special teams – Anthony Blevins; Coaching administration: Senior director of coaching operations – Justin Rudd; Manager of coaching administration – Chavis Cook; Director of research and analysis – Harrison Freid; Strength and conditioning: Head strength and conditioning – Pierre Ngo; Assistant strength and conditioning – Allison Haley; Assistant strength and conditioning – Noble Landry; Assistant strength and conditioning – Reshard Langford; Assistant strength and conditioning – Mark Philippi; → Coaching staff → Front office → More NFL staffs

== Minor league affiliates ==
The NFL, contrary to the four other major sports leagues in North America, does not have a formal farm system (beside the short-lived Association of Professional Football Leagues), and over the years some teams had "independent" minor affiliates throughout their existence. The Bears, along with the New York Giants, were at the forefront of those endeavors when in 1939, Halas purchased the American Association's Newark Tornadoes and renamed them the "Bears". Halas stocked the team with talent that did not make the Chicago roster, and used the club to incubate talent and for easy return for injured players, thus making it pro football's first true farm team. Newark's most notable names included Joe Zeller as coach and Gene Ronzani (that year Chicago also assigned Sid Luckman to Newark playoff game, which the Bears won 13–6, to win the Southern Division title). This practice continued sporadically until 1972, and ended with the collapse of several minor leagues along with the NFL labor disputes in the 1970s.

Other notable players assigned includes: George Gulyanics, Ed Ecker, Lloyd Reese, Raymond Schumacher, Jack Karwales and Doug McEnulty.

Team	League	Location	Stadium	Affiliated
Newark Bears	American Association	Newark, New Jersey	Newark Schools Stadium	1939–1941
Wichita Aero Commandos	Independent	Wichita, Kansas	Lawrence Stadium	1942
Akron Bears (Note: Halas also owned the Newark Bombers in 1946, but it acted as an independent team.)	American Football League	Akron, Ohio	Rubber Bowl	1946
Bloomfield Cardinals	American Football League	Bloomfield, New Jersey	Foley Field	1947
Richmond Rebels	American Football League	Richmond, Virginia	City Stadium	1948–1950
Quad City Mohawks	Midwest Professional Football League	Davenport, Iowa	Brady Street Stadium	1970–1972

== Sources ==
- Taylor, Roy (2004). Chicago Bears History. Arcadia Publishing (SC). ISBN 978-0-7385-3319-3.

Preceded by Akron Pros	NFL champions Chicago Staleys; 1921	Succeeded by Canton Bulldogs
Preceded by Green Bay Packers	NFL champions 1932, 1933	Succeeded by New York Giants
Preceded by Green Bay Packers	NFL champions 1940, 1941	Succeeded by Washington Redskins
Preceded by Washington Redskins	NFL champions 1943	Succeeded by Green Bay Packers
Preceded by Cleveland Rams	NFL champions 1946	Succeeded by Chicago Cardinals
Preceded by Green Bay Packers	NFL champions 1963	Succeeded by Cleveland Browns
Preceded by San Francisco 49ers	Super Bowl champions 1985 (XX)	Succeeded by New York Giants
