= Ralph Brizzolara =

American football executive and businessman

Profile
- Position: General manager

Personal information
- Born: October 28, 1895; Chicago, Illinois, U.S.
- Died: August 8, 1972 (aged 76); Chicago, Illinois, U.S.

Career history
- Chicago Bears (1942-1945) General Manager, Acting President
- Executive profile at Pro Football Reference

Ralph Dominick Brizzolara (October 28, 1895 – August 8, 1972) was an American businessman and was the general manager of the Chicago Bears for four seasons.

== Biography ==
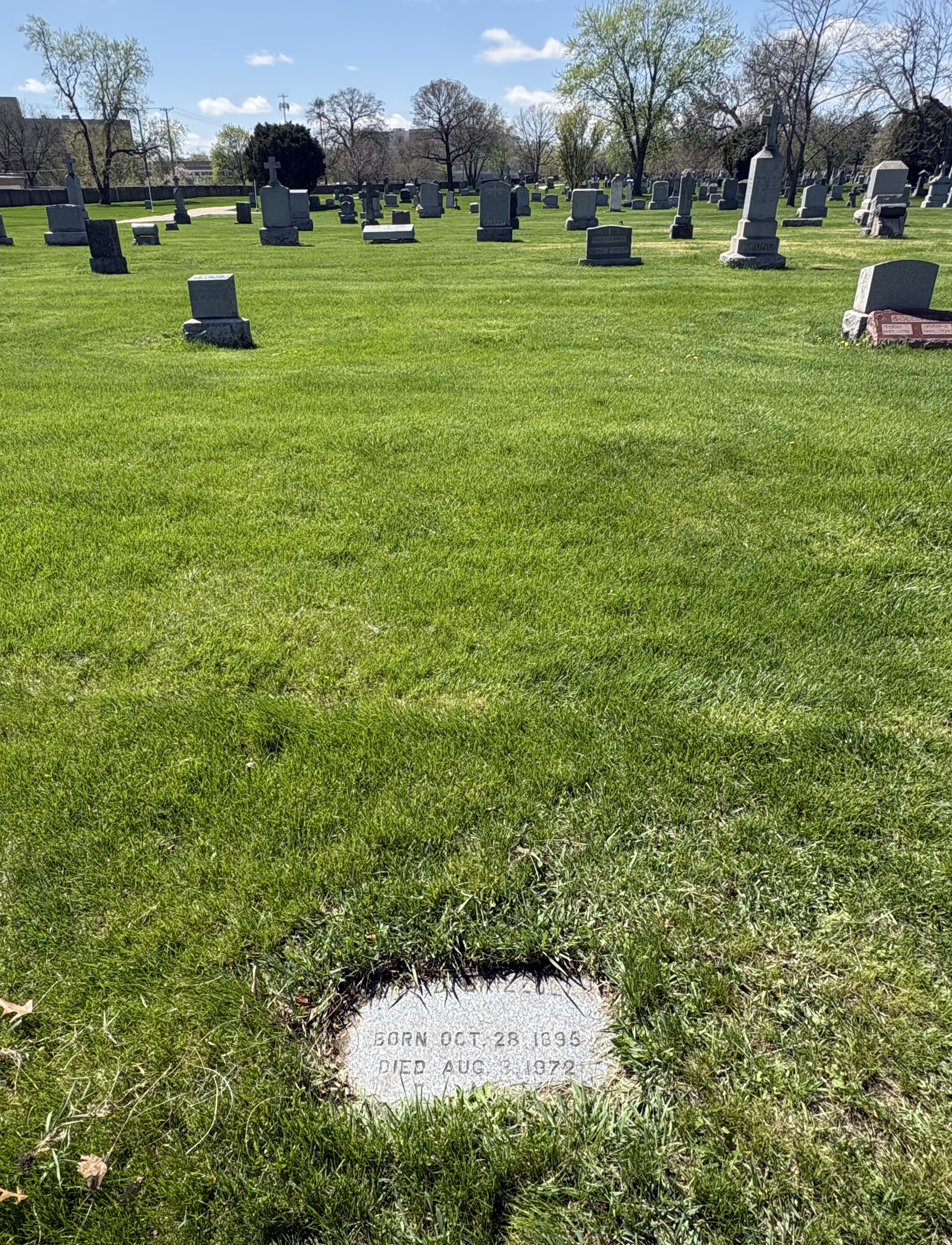
Brizzolara's grave at Calvary Cemetery

In 1915, Brizzolara and his brother were passengers on the Great Lakes steamer Eastland when it heeled over and sank in the Chicago River. Both of them escaped through portholes.

He was a friend of George Halas for many years and was given the general manager position when Halas went to the United States Navy. In his second season, he won the NFL Championship. Once Halas returned, he was no longer manager. He died on August 8, 1972, at the age of 76, and was buried at Calvary Cemetery in Evanston.
