= 2020 Chicago Bears season =

101st season in franchise history

- Owner: The McCaskey Family
- General manager: Ryan Pace
- Head coach: Matt Nagy
- Offensive coordinator: Bill Lazor
- Defensive coordinator: Chuck Pagano
- Home stadium: Soldier Field

Results
- Record: 8–8
- Division place: 2nd NFC North
- Playoffs: Lost Wild Card Playoffs (at Saints) 9–21
- All-Pros: OLB Khalil Mack (2nd team); KR Cordarrelle Patterson (1st team); MLB Roquan Smith (2nd team)
- Pro Bowlers: OLB Khalil Mack; RS Cordarrelle Patterson

Uniform
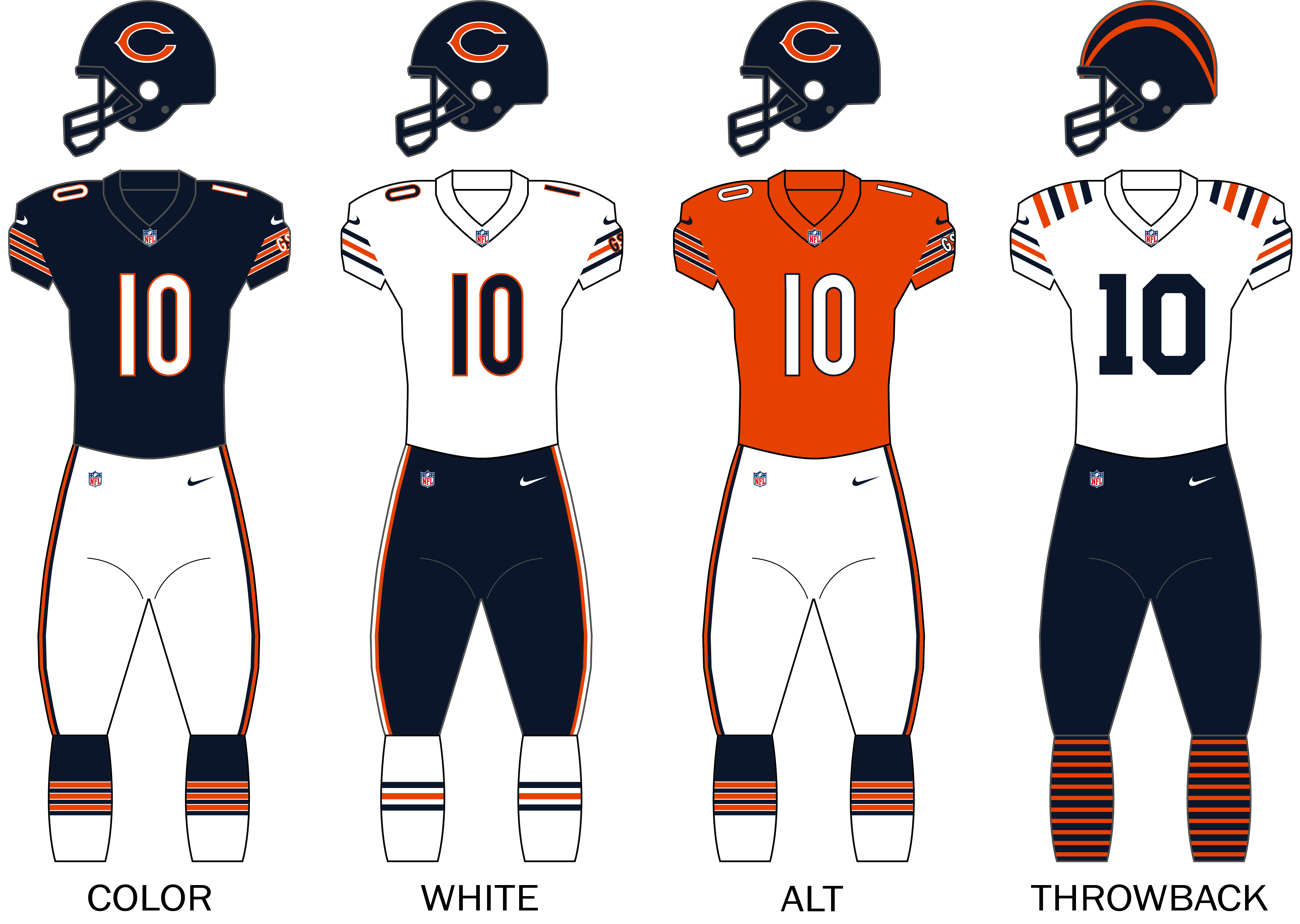

The 2020 season was the Chicago Bears' 101st overall in the National Football League (NFL), their 100th in Chicago, and their third under head coach Matt Nagy.

Despite starting the season 5–1, the Bears went on to lose their next six games, dropping them to 5–7. They finally snapped the losing streak with a win over the Houston Texans the following week, starting a three-game winning streak that allowed the Bears to be in playoff contention entering the final week of the season. From Week 13 to Week 16, the Bears scored at least 30 points each game, a feat that had not been achieved by the franchise since 1965.

Although the Bears lost to the Green Bay Packers in Week 17 and matched their 8–8 record from 2019, they clinched a playoff spot via tiebreakers over the Arizona Cardinals, (Note: The Bears won the third tiebreaker over the Cardinals—record vs. common opponents. The Bears' cumulative record vs. Carolina, Detroit, the Los Angeles Rams and the New York Giants was 3–2, compared to the Cardinals' 1–4 record vs. those four teams.) who lost in the same week to the Los Angeles Rams. The 2020 Bears became only the third team in NFL history to have a six-game losing streak during the regular season and qualify for the playoffs since the 1970 merger, joining the 1970 Cincinnati Bengals and 2014 Carolina Panthers. The Bears' season ended with a 21–9 loss to the New Orleans Saints in the Wild Card Round, with their final play being a touchdown. This was the last playoff appearance for the Bears until the 2025 season.

== Offseason ==
=== Organizational changes ===
On December 31, 2019, offensive coordinator Mark Helfrich, offensive line coach Harry Hiestand, tight ends coach Kevin M. Gilbride, and assistant special teams coach Brock Olivo were fired; the offense had struggled in 2019 as it finished the year ranked 29th. To take Hiestand's place, the Bears hired Juan Castillo on January 5, 2020; Castillo worked with head coach Matt Nagy on the Philadelphia Eagles staff from 2008 to 2012, and he was most recently the offensive line coach and run game coordinator for the Buffalo Bills in 2017 and 2018. Clancy Barone was hired as the tight ends coach on January 9; Barone was the 2018 Minnesota Vikings' offensive line coach after spending the previous season as their tight ends coach.

The remaining positions were filled on January 16 with various changes: Bill Lazor took over as offensive coordinator after last serving the same role in 2017 and 2018 with the Cincinnati Bengals; Jacksonville Jaguars offensive coordinator John DeFilippo was hired as quarterbacks coach; quarterbacks coach Dave Ragone was moved to pass game coordinator; offensive quality control assistant Brian Ginn became assistant special teams coach; defensive assistant Chris Jackson switched to assistant wide receivers coach; and offensive assistant Shane Toub was named defensive quality control coach.

=== Roster changes ===
Position	Player	Free agency Tag	Date signed	2020 team
LB	Devante Bond	UFA	February 22	Chicago Bears
DB	Deon Bush	UFA	March 26	Chicago Bears
OL	T. J. Clemmings	UFA		
DB	Ha Ha Clinton-Dix	UFA	March 20	Dallas Cowboys
OL	Rashaad Coward	ERFA	April 17	Chicago Bears
QB	Chase Daniel	UFA	March 20	Detroit Lions
TE	J. P. Holtz	ERFA	April 17	Chicago Bears
DB	DeAndre Houston-Carson	UFA	March 31	Chicago Bears
LB	Isaiah Irving	RFA	April 3	Chicago Bears
LB	Nick Kwiatkoski	UFA	March 27	Las Vegas Raiders
OL	Ted Larsen	UFA		
OL	Cornelius Lucas	UFA	March 27	Washington Football Team
LB	Aaron Lynch	UFA	May 5	Jacksonville Jaguars
DB	Sherrick McManis	UFA	April 16	Chicago Bears
LB	Kevin Pierre-Louis	UFA	March 31	Washington Football Team
DE	Roy Robertson-Harris	RFA	April 15	Chicago Bears
LS	Patrick Scales	UFA	March 26	Chicago Bears
TE	Bradley Sowell	UFA		
LB	Danny Trevathan	UFA	March 13	Chicago Bears
DE	Brent Urban	UFA	March 26	Chicago Bears
DT	Nick Williams	UFA	March 20	Detroit Lions

Entering the 2020 offseason, the Bears had 21 players set to become free agents, including two restricted free agents and two exclusive-rights free agents. Free agency officially began on March 18, though teams were not allowed to immediately announce signings due to physical examinations being delayed by the coronavirus pandemic.

==== Acquisitions ====
Shortly after the 2019 season came to an end, the Bears signed wide receivers Reggie Davis, Thomas Ives, and Alex Wesley; tight end Dax Raymond; offensive linemen Dino Boyd and Sam Mustipher; linebacker James Vaughters; and defensive backs Xavier Crawford and Stephen Denmark to reserve/future contracts. All nine players were members of the practice squad in 2019, with Vaughters being the only one to play in the regular season that year. On January 6, tight end Darion Clark was also signed to a reserve/future contract; a former college basketball player, Clark had last played football in high school but participated in the USC Trojans football Pro Day in 2018. Two days later, another reserve contract was signed by safety Kentrell Brice, who started 14 games for the 2018 Green Bay Packers.

On January 29, the Bears signed Calgary Stampeders cornerback Tre Roberson on a two-year deal; the Canadian Football League player won the 106th Grey Cup in 2018 and recorded seven interceptions in 2019. Chicago did not sign another player until February 20 when they added Cleveland Browns tight end Demetrius Harris, who played under Nagy in Kansas City, on a one-year contract.

The Bears began making free agent transactions official on March 26. In addition to re-signing free agents like quarterback Tyler Bray whose practice squad contract expired in January, the team signed tight end Jimmy Graham, cornerback Artie Burns and safety Jordan Lucas. A five-time Pro Bowler, Graham spent the last two seasons with the Packers; Burns was a former first-round draft pick by the Pittsburgh Steelers with four career interceptions; Lucas was a backup for the Kansas City Chiefs as they won Super Bowl LIV. On March 31, the Bears formally traded for Jacksonville Jaguars quarterback Nick Foles in exchange for a compensatory fourth-round selection in the 2020 NFL Draft; the Super Bowl LII MVP who worked with Nagy in Philadelphia and Kansas City, Foles' lone season in Jacksonville saw him suffer an injury and make only four starts. A day later, offensive lineman Germain Ifedi and linebacker Robert Quinn signed with the team on one- and five-year deals, respectively; a former first-round draft pick, Ifedi had spent his career with the Seattle Seahawks, while Quinn recorded 11.5 sacks with the 2019 Dallas Cowboys.

On April 3, the team picked up linebacker Barkevious Mingo on a one-year contract; the ex-first rounder spent much of his only season with the Houston Texans on special teams. Two weeks later, former Green Bay Packers offensive lineman Jason Spriggs and Nevada kicker Ramiz Ahmed were signed to one-year deals. On April 28 and 29, Chicago gave one-year deals to defensive tackle John Jenkins and receiver/return specialist Trevor Davis, respectively. Jenkins played eight games for the Bears in 2017, including one start, and recorded eight tackles. Davis played for the Oakland Raiders and Miami Dolphins in 2019 as a receiver and return specialist, including catching four passes for 42 yards in the Raiders' win over the Bears that year.

Safety Tashaun Gipson was signed to a one-year deal on May 1. Released by the Texans earlier in the week, he recorded 51 tackles and three interceptions (one of which was returned for a touchdown) in 2019 before being placed on injured reserve. Three days later, the Bears added receiver Ted Ginn Jr., also on a one-year agreement; the 13-year veteran caught 30 passes for 421 yards and two touchdowns for the New Orleans Saints in 2019.

==== Departures ====
On January 5, guard Kyle Long announced his retirement on Twitter after playing his entire career with the Bears; he struggled with injuries in his later years, including being placed on injured reserve in 2019.

The Bears' first cuts took place on February 21 with receiver Taylor Gabriel and cornerback Prince Amukamara; both players suffered injuries in 2019. Linebacker Leonard Floyd was released on March 17; the former first-round pick recorded 154 tackles, 18.5 sacks, an interception, and three fumble recoveries in four seasons with the Bears, but had just three sacks in 2019.

After free agency began, various Bears players whose contracts expired left for other teams. On March 20, a trio of Bears departed with safety Ha Ha Clinton-Dix joining the Dallas Cowboys, while quarterback Chase Daniel and defensive lineman Nick Williams went to the Detroit Lions. In his lone season with the Bears, Clinton-Dix recorded 78 tackles and two interceptions, returning one for a touchdown; as a backup in Chicago, Daniel started three games; Williams recorded six sacks in 2019. A week later, linebacker Nick Kwiatkoski joined the Las Vegas Raiders after recording career bests in tackles (76), sacks (three), and pass breakups (four) as a backup in 2019. A pair of Bears in linebacker Kevin Pierre-Louis and offensive lineman Cornelius Lucas signed with the Washington Redskins (renamed Washington Football Team in July); Pierre-Louis started three games for Chicago in 2019 as he had a career-high 32 tackles, three pass deflections, and an interception, while Lucas started eight games at tackle and allowed just one sack. Defensive end Aaron Lynch, who recorded six tackles and two sacks in 2019 and had spent the last two seasons in Chicago, joined the Jaguars.

On April 17, tight end Trey Burton was released. Despite recording career bests in receiving in his first year with the Bears in 2018, he struggled with injuries in 2019. Another tight end Dax Raymond was waived ten days later; he spent the 2019 season on the practice squad after catching three passes for 22 yards in the preseason.

=== NFL draft ===
The Bears entered the 2020 NFL draft with sports outlets generally agreeing they needed help at tight end, offensive line, and defensive back, with quarterback and wide receiver also being positions that could be bolstered. Prior to the draft, the team met with 46 prospects: three such meetings took place at the player's Pro Day on his respective campus, five at the East–West Shrine Bowl, eight at the Senior Bowl, 11 at the NFL Scouting Combine, and 19 conducted virtually; Houston offensive lineman Josh Jones also participated in a private visit with the Bears.

After not having any picks in the first round for the second consecutive year, Chicago used its two second-round selections on Notre Dame tight end Cole Kmet (No. 43) and Utah cornerback Jaylon Johnson (No. 50). Kmet, who grew up near Chicago and was a Bears fan during his childhood, caught 43 passes for 515 yards and six touchdowns in 2019, while Johnson was named first-team All-Pac-12 Conference and recorded 36 tackles two interceptions during his final year, but fell from his projected first-round draft grade after undergoing surgeries on his shoulders. In the fourth round, the Bears traded their No. 163 selection and a 2021 fourth rounder for the Minnesota Vikings' No. 155 pick, which they used on Tulsa edge rusher Trevis Gipson; in 2019, Gipson led his team in sacks and tackles-for-loss (TFL) with eight and 15, respectively. A second fifth rounder (No. 163) was used to take Georgia Southern cornerback Kindle Vildor, a 2019 first-team All-Sun Belt Conference member who recorded 27 tackles and two interceptions in his final season. Later in the round, the Bears traded the 196th-, 200th-, and 233rd-overall picks to the Eagles for No. 173 and the seventh-round No. 227. Tulane receiver Darnell Mooney was selected with the 173rd-overall pick; Mooney, who ran a 4.38-second 40-yard dash at the Combine, caught 48 passes for 713 yards in 2019 and ended his college career with 19 receiving touchdowns. The final two selections were consecutive picks in seventh round (Nos. 226 and 227) and were used to take offensive linemen: Colorado tackle Arlington Hambright started 11 games for his school in 2019, while Lachavious Simmons started all four years at Tennessee State at guard and tackle.

After the draft, the Bears signed 11 undrafted free agents: running backs Napoleon Maxwell (Florida Atlantic) and Artavis Pierce (Oregon State); receiver Ahmad Wagner (Kentucky); guard Dieter Eiselen (Yale); offensive tackle Badara Traore (LSU); defensive tackles Lee Autry (Mississippi State) and Trevor McSwain (Duke); linebackers Keandre Jones (Maryland), Ledarius Mack (Buffalo), LaCale London (Western Illinois), and Rashad Smith (Florida Atlantic).

The seven draft picks signed four-year contracts on July 21.

2020 Chicago Bears draft
Round	Pick	Player	Position	College	Notes
2	43	Cole Kmet	TE	Notre Dame	via Las Vegas
2	50	Jaylon Johnson *	CB	Utah	
5	155	Trevis Gipson	LB	Tulsa	via Minnesota
5	163	Kindle Vildor	CB	Georgia Southern	
5	173	Darnell Mooney	WR	Tulane	via Philadelphia
7	226	Arlington Hambright	OG	Colorado	
7	227	Lachavious Simmons	OG	Tennessee State	via Philadelphia
Made roster † Pro Football Hall of Fame * Made at least one Pro Bowl during career

Notes

- In September 2018, the Bears traded their first– and third-round selections (Nos. 19 and 81, respectively), along with 2019 first- and sixth-round selections to the Las Vegas Raiders (known then as the "Oakland Raiders") in exchange for linebacker Khalil Mack and the Raiders' second- (No. 43) and seventh- (No. 226) round selections; the latter of which was originally a conditional fifth-round selection.
- The Bears traded their original fourth-round selection (No. 125) as well as 2019 third- and fifth-round selections to the New England Patriots in exchange for Patriots' 2019 third- and sixth-round selections.
- The Bears acquired an additional sixth-round selection (No. 200) in a trade that sent running back Jordan Howard to the Philadelphia Eagles.
- As the result of the negative differential of free agent signings and departures that the Bears experienced during the first wave of the 2019 free agency period, the team received one compensatory selection, 4th round—No. 140, to compensate for the loss of safety Adrian Amos. It was the first time since 2009 that the Bears received a compensatory selection.

=== Offseason activities ===
Training Camp took place at Halas Hall in Lake Forest, Illinois; the Bears had previously held the camp at Olivet Nazarene University in Bourbonnais since 2002, but renovations to Halas Hall prompted the move.

The COVID-19 pandemic restricted offseason access to Halas Hall and forced team gatherings like rookie minicamp, which was originally scheduled for May 8–10, to be conducted online via Zoom. The offseason program, planned to run from May 18 to June 26, ended early on June 9 to allow players to emphasize physical workouts. When Training Camp began on July 28, the Bears implemented pandemic safety protocols that included designating head trainer Andre Tucker as infectious control officer and converting a player's lounge into an additional locker room. Full-contact practice began on August 17. Training Camp ran for three weeks with the final padded practice taking place on September 2.

The NFL mandated rosters be reduced to 80 players prior to Training Camp. On July 22, tight end Ben Braunecker was let go after playing for the Bears for four seasons; he had six receptions for 59 yards and a touchdown before being placed on injured reserve in 2019. Yet another tight end, 2017 second-round draft pick Adam Shaheen, was traded on July 26 to the Miami Dolphins for a 2021 seventh-round selection; linebacker Devante Bond, Brice, and Wesley were released the same day. The Bears released Roberson on July 28 with a non-football injury designation after breaking his foot while training. Ahmed was waived on August 11, with former Rams defensive back Marqui Christian being signed the next day. On August 20, Burns was placed on injured reserve after hurting his left knee in practice three days prior; receiver Rodney Adams, who had been on the Indianapolis Colts' reserve/retired list earlier in the spring, was signed. Former Bears kicker Cairo Santos returned to the team on August 25 when regular kicker Eddy Piñeiro was nursing a groin injury, while Wesley was signed, Davis was released, and Clark was placed on injured reserve. Cornerback Michael Joseph went on injured reserve on August 31 and Maxwell took his slot.

The league also introduced a reserve/COVID-19 list and opt-out designation; the former consisted of players who either tested positive for the coronavirus or were recently exposed to an infected person, while the latter allowed players to forgo playing in 2020 for health concerns with their salary rolling over into 2021. Lucas and starting nose tackle Eddie Goldman elected to opt out of playing. Among the players placed on the reserve/COVID-19 list were Pierce, Jenkins, and tight end Eric Saubert. The three were activated from the list on August 2 and 3, with Boyd and Maxwell being released to accommodate the moves.

After Training Camp's conclusion, roster cuts to reach the 53-man limit began on September 3 with Maxwell, Wesley and Wagner, offensive lineman Corey Levin, Autry, and Jones. The final day of cuts came two days later, with the following players being released: Adams, Bray, Crawford, Denmark, Eiselen, Ives, London, Mack, McSwain, Mustipher, Pierce, Santos, Simmons, Smith, Traore, defensive tackle Abdullah Anderson, cornerback Kevin Toliver, and tight end Jesper Horsted.

Adams, Anderson, Bray, Crawford, Davis, Denmark, Horsted, Ives, London, Mustipher, Pierce, Santos, Simmons, Smith, Traore were signed to the practice squad on September 6, as was former Atlanta Falcons offensive lineman Jamon Brown. Due to COVID-19, the NFL expanded practice squads from 12 to 16 members, with six players being allowed regardless of experience.

== Staff ==
2020 Chicago Bears staff
Front office: Secretary of the board of directors – Virginia Halas McCaskey; Chairman – George McCaskey; President/CEO – Ted Phillips; General manager – Ryan Pace; Senior vice president/General counsel – Cliff Stein; Director of player personnel – Josh Lucas; Assistant director of player personnel – Champ Kelly; Director of college scouting – Mark Sadowski; Director of football administration – Joey Laine; Head coaches: Head coach – Matt Nagy; Offensive coaches: Offensive coordinator – Bill Lazor; Pass game coordinator – Dave Ragone; Quarterbacks – John DeFilippo; Running backs – Charles London; Wide receivers – Mike Furrey; Assistant wide receivers/offensive quality control – Chris Jackson; Tight ends – Clancy Barone; Offensive line – Juan Castillo; Assistant offensive line – Donovan Raiola; Offensive assistant – Mike Harris; Offensive quality control – Mike Snyder	Defensive coaches: Defensive coordinator – Chuck Pagano; Defensive line – Jay Rodgers; Senior defensive assistant/outside linebackers – Ted Monachino; Inside linebackers – Mark DeLeone; Pass rush analyst/assistant linebackers – Bill Shuey; Secondary – Deshea Townsend; Safeties – Sean Desai; Defensive quality control – Shane Toub; Defensive quality control – Ronell Williams; Special teams coaches: Special teams coordinator – Chris Tabor; Assistant special teams – Brian Ginn; Strength and conditioning: Strength and conditioning – Jason Loscalzo; Assistant strength and conditioning – Casey Kramer; Strength and conditioning assistant – Pierre Ngo; Head athletic trainer – Andre Tucker

== Final roster ==
2020 Chicago Bears roster
Quarterbacks (QB): 9 Nick Foles; 10 Mitchell Trubisky; Running backs (RB): 32 David Montgomery; 35 Ryan Nall; 46 Artavis Pierce; Wide receivers (WR): 19 DeAndre Carter; 17 Anthony Miller; 11 Darnell Mooney; 84 Cordarrelle Patterson; 88 Riley Ridley; 12 Allen Robinson; 83 Javon Wims; Tight ends (TE): 80 Jimmy Graham; 86 Demetrius Harris; 81 J. P. Holtz; 85 Cole Kmet	Offensive linemen (OL): 64 Alex Bars G/C; 69 Rashaad Coward G/T; 71 Arlington Hambright G; 74 Germain Ifedi G/T; 72 Charles Leno T; 67 Sam Mustipher C; 73 Lachavious Simmons T; 78 Jason Spriggs T; 65 Cody Whitehair C/G; Defensive linemen (DL): 97 Mario Edwards Jr. DE; 96 Akiem Hicks DE; 90 John Jenkins NT; 75 Daniel McCullers NT; 98 Bilal Nichols NT; 92 Brent Urban DE	Linebackers (LB): 99 Trevis Gipson OLB; 45 Joel Iyiegbuniwe ILB; 52 Khalil Mack OLB; 50 Barkevious Mingo OLB; 94 Robert Quinn OLB; 58 Roquan Smith ILB; 59 Danny Trevathan ILB; 93 James Vaughters OLB; 55 Josh Woods ILB; Defensive backs (DB): 26 Deon Bush FS; 23 Kyle Fuller CB; 38 Tashaun Gipson SS; 36 DeAndre Houston-Carson SS; 39 Eddie Jackson FS; 33 Jaylon Johnson CB; 27 Sherrick McManis CB; 20 Duke Shelley CB; 24 Buster Skrine CB; 22 Kindle Vildor CB; Special teams (ST): 16 Pat O'Donnell P; 2 Cairo Santos K; 48 Patrick Scales LS	Practice squad: 13 Rodney Adams WR; 44 Devante Bond ILB; 8 Tyler Bray QB; 43 Marqui Christian FS; 47 Xavier Crawford CB; 18 Reggie Davis WR (PS/I); 60 Dieter Eiselen G; 87 Jesper Horsted TE; 14 Thomas Ives WR; 62 Eric Kush C/G; 63 LaCale London DE; 53 Ledarius Mack OLB; 30 Sojourn Shelton CB; 4 Kyle Sloter QB; 37 Teez Tabor CB; 57 Manti Te'o ILB; 79 Badara Traore T (PS/I); 25 Spencer Ware RB; Reserve: 37 Artie Burns CB (IR); 49 Darion Clark TE (IR); 29 Tarik Cohen RB (IR); 68 James Daniels G (IR); 91 Eddie Goldman NT (Opt-out); 82 Dwayne Harris WR (IR); 30 Michael Joseph CB (IR); 21 Jordan Lucas SS (Opt-out); 70 Bobby Massie T (IR/DFR); 15 Eddy Piñeiro K (IR); 31 Tre Roberson CB (NF-Inj.); 95 Roy Robertson-Harris DE (IR); Rookies in italics 53 active, 12 reserve, 16 practice squad (2 exempt)

== Preseason ==
The Bears' preseason slate was announced on May 7, but was later cancelled due to the COVID-19 pandemic.

Week	Date	Opponent	Venue	Result
1	August 15	Cleveland Browns	Soldier Field	Cancelled due to the COVID-19 pandemic
2	August 22	at Denver Broncos	Empower Field at Mile High	Cancelled due to the COVID-19 pandemic
3	August 29	San Francisco 49ers	Soldier Field	Cancelled due to the COVID-19 pandemic
4	September 3	at Tennessee Titans	Nissan Stadium	Cancelled due to the COVID-19 pandemic

== Regular season ==
=== Schedule ===
The Bears' 2020 schedule was announced on May 7.

Week	Date	Opponent	Result	Record	Venue	Recap
1	September 13	at **Detroit Lions**	**W** 27–23	1–0	Ford Field	Recap
2	September 20	New York Giants	**W** 17–13	2–0	Soldier Field	Recap
3	September 27	at Atlanta Falcons	**W** 30–26	3–0	Mercedes-Benz Stadium	Recap
4	October 4	Indianapolis Colts	**L** 11–19	3–1	Soldier Field	Recap
5	October 8	Tampa Bay Buccaneers	**W** 20–19	4–1	Soldier Field	Recap
6	October 18	at Carolina Panthers	**W** 23–16	5–1	Bank of America Stadium	Recap
7	October 26	at Los Angeles Rams	**L** 10–24	5–2	SoFi Stadium	Recap
8	November 1	New Orleans Saints	**L** 23–26 (OT)	5–3	Soldier Field	Recap
9	November 8	at Tennessee Titans	**L** 17–24	5–4	Nissan Stadium	Recap
10	November 16	**Minnesota Vikings**	**L** 13–19	5–5	Soldier Field	Recap
11	Bye					
12	November 29	at **Green Bay Packers**	**L** 25–41	5–6	Lambeau Field	Recap
13	December 6	**Detroit Lions**	**L** 30–34	5–7	Soldier Field	Recap
14	December 13	Houston Texans	**W** 36–7	6–7	Soldier Field	Recap
15	December 20	at **Minnesota Vikings**	**W** 33–27	7–7	U.S. Bank Stadium	Recap
16	December 27	at Jacksonville Jaguars	**W** 41–17	8–7	TIAA Bank Field	Recap
17	January 3	**Green Bay Packers**	**L** 16–35	8–8	Soldier Field	Recap
Notes: * Intra-division opponents are in **bold** text.

=== Game summaries ===
==== Week 1: at Detroit Lions ====
Week One: Chicago Bears at Detroit Lions – Game summary

Quarter	1	2	3	4	Total
**Bears**	3	3	0	21	**27**
Lions	3	10	10	0	**23**

at Ford Field, Detroit, Michigan

- Date: September 13
- Game time: 1:00 p.m. EDT/12:00 p.m. CDT
- Game weather: None (indoor stadium)
- Game attendance: 0
- Referee: Alex Kemp
- TV announcers (Fox): Dick Stockton, Jonathan Vilma and Shannon Spake
- Recap, Game Book

Game information

**First quarter**

- DET – Matt Prater 27-yard field goal, 6:30. Lions 3–0. **Drive: 7 plays, 56 yards, 2:27.**
- CHI – Cairo Santos 35-yard field goal, 1:30. Tied 3–3. **Drive: 10 plays, 58 yards, 5:00.**

**Second quarter**

- DET – Matt Prater 32-yard field goal, 5:33. Lions 6–3. **Drive: 12 plays, 73 yards, 5:11.**
- CHI – Cairo Santos 28-yard field goal, 2:02. Tied 6–6. **Drive: 8 plays, 67 yards, 3:31.**
- DET – D'Andre Swift 1-yard run (Matt Prater kick), 0:19. Lions 13–6. **Drive: 4 plays, 48 yards, 0:21.**

**Third quarter**

- DET – T. J. Hockenson 4-yard pass from Matthew Stafford (Matt Prater kick), 10:37. Lions 20–6. **Drive: 8 plays, 72 yards, 4:23.**
- DET – Matt Prater 44-yard field goal, 3:19. Lions 23–6. **Drive: 8 plays, 64 yards, 4:10.**

**Fourth quarter**

- CHI – Jimmy Graham 2-yard pass from Mitchell Trubisky (Cairo Santos kick), 13:39. Lions 23–13. **Drive: 11 plays, 59 yards, 4:40.**
- CHI – Javon Wims 1-yard pass from Mitchell Trubisky (Cairo Santos kick), 2:58. Lions 23–20. **Drive: 5 plays, 55 yards, 1:04.**
- CHI – Anthony Miller 27-yard pass from Mitchell Trubisky (Cairo Santos kick), 1:54. Bears 27–23. **Drive: 2 plays, 37 yards, 0:41.**

**Top passers**

- CHI – Mitchell Trubisky – 20/36, 242 yards, 3 TD
- DET – Matthew Stafford – 24/42, 297 yards, TD, INT

**Top rushers**

- CHI – David Montgomery – 13 rushes, 64 yards
- DET – Adrian Peterson – 14 rushes, 93 yards

**Top receivers**

- CHI – Allen Robinson – 5 receptions, 74 yards
- DET – Danny Amendola – 5 receptions, 81 yards

The 2020 season opener was a rivalry game against the Detroit Lions, who finished last in the NFC North in 2019; entering the game, the Bears led the all-time rivalry 101–74–5 and had won the last four meetings. In the week leading up to the opener, Matt Nagy named Mitchell Trubisky the starting quarterback over Nick Foles after the two battled for the position in Training Camp. Other moves during the week included signing defensive end Mario Edwards Jr. and placing Eddy Piñeiro on injured reserve on Tuesday due to his groin injury; Cairo Santos was activated from the practice squad to fill in for the latter (under the 2020 revised collective bargaining agreement, teams no longer had to release a player from the active roster to accommodate for practice squad promotions). Edwards, Robert Quinn (ankle injury), Eric Saubert, cornerback Duke Shelley, receiver Riley Ridley, and Arlington Hambright were not active for the game. Trubisky, receiver Allen Robinson, linebackers Danny Trevathan and Khalil Mack, defensive tackle Akiem Hicks, and punter Pat O'Donnell served as the Bears' team captains; under Nagy, the team has regularly rotated captains for each game rather than permanently appointing players to the positions.

The two teams traded punts to begin the game; after the Bears turned the ball over on downs in Lions territory, Matt Prater and Santos exchanged field goals of 27 and 35 yards, respectively. Another punt and field goal swap took place in the second quarter as Prater made a 32-yarder and Santos from 28 yards. After two more punts, Detroit scored the first touchdown of the game with 19 seconds remaining in the first half on D'Andre Swift's one-yard run, which had been set up by Matthew Stafford's 16- and 24-yard completions to T. J. Hockenson. The Lions' momentum continued in the second half when Stafford led a 72-yard drive that culminated in a four-yard touchdown pass to Hockenson, followed by Prater's 44-yard field goal to increase the gap to 23–6. Chicago's offense, which had struggled early as it failed to convert its first seven third-down situations, rebounded in the fourth quarter as Trubisky threw a two-yard touchdown pass to Jimmy Graham. Another exchange of punts led to Prater missing a 55-yard attempt wide right, followed by Trubisky's one-yard score to Javon Wims. On the ensuing drive, Jaylon Johnson tipped Stafford's pass for Marvin Jones, which Kyle Fuller intercepted and returned to the Lions' 37-yard line. On the second play of the drive, Trubisky completed a 27-yard touchdown pass to Anthony Miller that put the Bears ahead 27–23. Detroit attempted to respond and reached Chicago's 11-yard line, but Swift dropped the game-winning touchdown pass with six seconds remaining. Johnson broke up Stafford's final throw to secure the victory.

The victory was the Bears' first in a season opener since 2013, while the 21 points scored in the fourth quarter were the most in the final period since 2014 against the Dallas Cowboys; it was also Chicago's first fourth-quarter comeback from double digits since a 2015 win over the Kansas City Chiefs. Trubisky, who completed just eight of 20 passes for 110 yards in the first half, went eight-of-ten for 89 yards and three touchdowns in the fourth quarter. In his post-game conference, Trubisky attributed his late success to the Lions' switch to man-to-man defense, explaining that "when they got down to the wire, they're going to play what they trust most and that's man for them. And we knew that."

A day after the game, Ledarius Mack was signed to the practice squad, where he replaced Abdullah Anderson.

==== Week 2: vs. New York Giants ====
Week Two: New York Giants at Chicago Bears – Game summary

Quarter	1	2	3	4	Total
Giants	0	0	3	10	**13**
**Bears**	10	7	0	0	**17**

at Soldier Field, Chicago, Illinois

- Date: September 20
- Game time: 12:00 p.m. CDT
- Game weather: 66 °F (19 °C)
- Game attendance: 0
- Referee: Bill Vinovich
- TV announcers (CBS): Ian Eagle, Charles Davis and Evan Washburn
- Recap, Game Book

Game information

**First quarter**

- CHI – David Montgomery 28-yard pass from Mitchell Trubisky (Cairo Santos kick), 7:25. Bears 7–0. **Drive: 12 plays, 82 yards, 7:35.**
- CHI – Cairo Santos 34-yard field goal, 4:36. Bears 10–0. **Drive: 4 plays, 4 yards, 1:36.**

**Second quarter**

- CHI – Darnell Mooney 15-yard pass from Mitchell Trubisky (Cairo Santos kick), 0:14. Bears 17–0. **Drive: 11 plays, 80 yards, 5:15.**

**Third quarter**

- NYG – Graham Gano 39-yard field goal, 9:50. Bears 17–3. **Drive: 4 plays, 4 yards, 1:31.**

**Fourth quarter**

- NYG – Dion Lewis 1-yard run (Graham Gano kick), 14:18. Bears 17–10. **Drive: 11 plays, 95 yards, 4:39.**
- NYG – Graham Gano 37-yard field goal, 7:43. Bears 17–13. **Drive: 10 plays, 47 yards, 4:31.**

**Top passers**

- NYG – Daniel Jones – 25/40, 241 yards, INT
- CHI – Mitchell Trubisky – 18/28, 190 yards, 2 TD, 2 INT

**Top rushers**

- NYG – Saquon Barkley – 4 rushes, 48 yards
- CHI – David Montgomery – 16 rushes, 82 yards

**Top receivers**

- NYG – Evan Engram – 6 receptions, 65 yards
- CHI – David Montgomery – 3 receptions, 45 yards, TD

Chicago's home opener came against the 0–1 New York Giants, whom the Bears defeated 19–14 in 2019; in 60 all-time meetings, the Bears led the series 34–24–2. During the week entering the game, Santos was reactivated from the practice squad and Eric Saubert was released. When Jamon Brown and Rashad Smith were respectively signed off the practice squad by the Philadelphia Eagles and Dallas Cowboys, Devante Bond and Dieter Eiselen took their places; Bond was promoted to the active roster the day before kickoff. Linebacker Josh Woods (personal reasons), Ted Ginn Jr., Trevis Gipson, Hambright, Ridley, and Shelley were inactive. Safety DeAndre Houston-Carson was the Bears' lone captain.

The Bears began the game on a strong note with an 82-yard opening drive in which they converted all four third-down situations and Trubisky completed each of his four pass attempts, culminating in a 28-yard touchdown pass to David Montgomery. On the third play of the Giants' first series, Quinn sacked and forced Daniel Jones to fumble, with Khalil Mack recovering. After Miller dropped a potential receiving touchdown in the end zone, Santos made a 34-yard field goal. Two drives later, Jones' pass for Evan Engram was intercepted by Deon Bush, though the Bears failed to capitalize and punted. Following another Giants punt, Trubisky led an 80-yard drive that ended with a 15-yard score to Darnell Mooney, who caught the pass over Corey Ballentine. New York kicker Graham Gano missed a 57-yard field goal wide left to end the first half with Chicago leading 17–0. The Giants punted on their first drive of the second half, but would score 13 unanswered points on their next three possessions: after Trubisky's pass for Robinson was deflected by James Bradberry and intercepted by Julian Love, Gano made a 39-yard kick; a Bears punt led to a 95-yard possession by New York that ended with Dion Lewis' one-yard touchdown run; a second Trubisky interception, this time when Bradberry pulled the ball from Robinson, led to Gano's 37-yarder. The third score had nearly resulted in a touchdown by the Bears when safety Eddie Jackson intercepted Jones and returned it for a score, but he was called for defensive pass interference after hitting Kaden Smith too soon. The Bears' last drive of the game ran for 44 yards, including a tipped pass on fourth down that was caught by offensive lineman Bobby Massie, though Santos missed a 50-yard kick with 2:02 remaining. The Giants would reach the Bears' ten-yard line, but Jones' final pass for Golden Tate was broken up by Jackson, while the ensuing penalty was an offensive pass interference on Tate.

It was the Bears' first 2–0 start since 2013. Although Hicks remarked in his post-game conference that such a record was "delicious" regardless of how it is attained, Nagy described his team as "just OK right now. I think we expect a little better."

==== Week 3: at Atlanta Falcons ====
Week Three: Chicago Bears at Atlanta Falcons – Game summary

Quarter	1	2	3	4	Total
**Bears**	3	7	0	20	**30**
Falcons	6	10	10	0	**26**

at Mercedes-Benz Stadium, Atlanta, Georgia

- Date: September 27
- Game time: 1:00 p.m. EDT/12:00 p.m. CDT
- Game weather: Partly cloudy, 79 °F (26 °C) (retractable roof open)
- Game attendance: 0
- Referee: Jerome Boger
- TV announcers (Fox): Kenny Albert, Jonathan Vilma and Shannon Spake
- Recap, Game Book

Game information

**First quarter**

- ATL – Hayden Hurst 1-yard pass from Matt Ryan (kick failed), 9:43. Falcons 6–0. **Drive: 3 plays, 64 yards, 1:09.**
- CHI – Cairo Santos 35-yard field goal, 2:43. Falcons 6–3. **Drive: 12 plays, 58 yards, 7:00.**

**Second quarter**

- ATL – Younghoe Koo 29-yard field goal, 8:31. Falcons 9–3. **Drive: 12 plays, 53 yards, 6:18.**
- ATL – Brian Hill 35-yard run (Younghoe Koo kick), 4:37. Falcons 16–3. **Drive: 5 plays, 62 yards, 1:17.**
- CHI – Jimmy Graham 2-yard pass from Mitchell Trubisky (Cairo Santos kick), 1:50. Falcons 16–10. **Drive: 7 plays, 75 yards, 2:47.**

**Third quarter**

- ATL – Todd Gurley 10-yard run (Younghoe Koo kick), 12:34. Falcons 23–10. **Drive: 7 plays, 75 yards, 2:26.**
- ATL – Younghoe Koo 36-yard field goal, 9:58. Falcons 26–10. **Drive: 4 plays, 1 yard, 0:55.**

**Fourth quarter**

- CHI – Jimmy Graham 3-yard pass from Nick Foles (pass failed), 6:20. Falcons 26–16. **Drive: 9 plays, 62 yards, 2:50.**
- CHI – Allen Robinson 37-yard pass from Nick Foles (Cairo Santos kick), 4:21. Falcons 26–23. **Drive: 3 plays, 55 yards, 0:59.**
- CHI – Anthony Miller 37-yard pass from Nick Foles (Cairo Santos kick), 1:53. Bears 30–26. **Drive: 5 plays, 44 yards, 2:06.**

**Top passers**

- CHI – Nick Foles – 16/29, 188 yards, 3 TD, INT
- ATL – Matt Ryan – 19/38, 238 yards, TD, INT

**Top rushers**

- CHI – David Montgomery – 14 rushes, 45 yards
- ATL – Todd Gurley – 14 rushes, 80 yards, TD

**Top receivers**

- CHI – Allen Robinson – 10 receptions, 123 yards, TD
- ATL – Calvin Ridley – 5 receptions, 110 yards

The 0–2 Atlanta Falcons hosted the Bears in Week 3. Although Chicago lost 23–17 in the most recent meeting between the two in 2017, they won 27–13 in the last game in Atlanta in 2014; the Bears led the series 14–13. Marqui Christian, who was suspended for the first two games, was assigned to the practice squad on September 21, but he signed with the New York Jets two days later. When John Jenkins was placed on injured reserve for a thumb injury, the team signed nose tackle Daniel McCullers from the Pittsburgh Steelers' practice squad. McCullers, Trevis Gipson, Hambright, Ridley, and Shelley were inactive.

Santos' 46-yard field goal sailed wide left on the opening drive, and the Falcons responded with a 63-yard pass by Matt Ryan to Calvin Ridley to set up Ryan's one-yard touchdown throw to Hayden Hurst, though Younghoe Koo missed the extra point. The two teams traded field goals (Santos from 35, Koo from 29), which was sandwiched between a punt exchange. During the second quarter, Ryan was sacked by Mack and fumbled, with Chicago's Bilal Nichols recovering before lateraling to cornerback Buster Skrine, which rolled out of bounds; however, Edwards and Skrine were penalized for roughing the passer and an illegal forward pass, respectively. Atlanta retained possession as a result, and Brian Hill scored on a 35-yard run. Chicago answered with a 75-yard drive, which included a 45-yard run by Trubisky, that culminated with his two-yard touchdown to Graham for the final score of the first half. The Falcons' first drive of the second half saw a ten-yard score by Todd Gurley, followed by Trubisky's third-down pass for Graham being intercepted by Blidi Wreh-Wilson when he failed to recognize Wreh-Wilson's zone defense. With the Bears having converted just one of seven third-down situations, Trubisky was replaced by Foles for the remainder of the game. After a 36-yard field goal by Koo, Foles' end zone throw to Robinson was simultaneously caught by Darqueze Dennard and ruled an interception. Following two punts and a missed 48-yard kick by Koo to begin the fourth quarter, Foles' potential 17-yard score to Miller hit the ground on fourth down, resulting in a turnover. Foles and the Bears would score 20 unanswered points as he completed touchdown throws to Graham (three yards, but failed the two-point conversion), Robinson (37 yards), and Miller (28 yards). A final drive by the Falcons ended at the Bears' 44-yard line when Ryan overthrew a pass and was intercepted by Tashaun Gipson to complete the 30–26 comeback.

As the Bears' 2013 trend continued with their first 3–0 start since that season, they also became the first team in NFL history to win multiple games in a season in which they overcame a 16-point deficit in the fourth quarter. Nagy explained benching the starting quarterback was "never fun", especially due to Trubisky's friendships with his teammates, but the move "seemed like the right time" after the interception. While Foles completed 16 of 29 passes for 188 yards, three touchdowns, and an interception, Trubisky had just 13 of 22 completions for 128 yards, a touchdown, and a pick. In his post-game conference, Foles described the quarterback switch as "really sucks" for Trubisky as he had experienced his own benchings during his career, adding that Trubisky had a "bright career ahead of him, this is just one day." Trubisky conceded that the "only thing I can control is me playing better when I have those reps in the first half and I didn't do that," while his new priority was "to move forward, accept it and continue to be a great teammate. But it's a tough deal sometimes."

Foles was officially named the starter a day after the game. Running back and punt returner Tarik Cohen tore his anterior cruciate ligament when Hill collided with his right leg, initially resulting in a Falcons penalty for fair catch interference before it was rescinded as Hill had been pushed into him. Cohen was placed on injured reserve on September 29 and Artavis Pierce was promoted from the practice squad. Former Tennessee Titans linebacker Sharif Finch and Tampa Bay Buccaneers defensive lineman Terry Beckner were added to the practice squad that same day.

==== Week 4: vs. Indianapolis Colts ====
Week Four: Indianapolis Colts at Chicago Bears – Game summary

Quarter	1	2	3	4	Total
**Colts**	7	6	3	3	**19**
Bears	0	3	0	8	**11**

at Soldier Field, Chicago, Illinois

- Date: October 4
- Game time: 3:25 p.m. CDT
- Game weather: Partly cloudy, 52 °F (11 °C)
- Game attendance: 0
- Referee: Craig Wrolstad
- TV announcers (CBS): Greg Gumbel, Rich Gannon and Amanda Balionis
- Recap, Game Book

Game information

**First quarter**

- IND – Mo Alie-Cox 13-yard pass from Philip Rivers (Rodrigo Blankenship kick), 8:08. Colts 7–0. **Drive: 6 plays, 53 yards, 3:35.**

**Second quarter**

- CHI – Cairo Santos 27-yard field goal, 9:24. Colts 7–3. **Drive: 9 plays, 84 yards, 4:55.**
- IND – Rodrigo Blankenship 21-yard field goal, 3:47. Colts 10–3. **Drive: 14 plays, 67 yards, 5:37.**
- IND – Rodrigo Blankenship 30-yard field goal, 0:06. Colts 13–3. **Drive: 8 plays, 43 yards, 1:59.**

**Third quarter**

- IND – Rodrigo Blankenship 44-yard field goal, 0:55. Colts 16–3. **Drive: 10 plays, 54 yards, 5:11.**

**Fourth quarter**

- IND – Rodrigo Blankenship 30-yard field goal, 3:47. Colts 19–3. **Drive: 13 plays, 66 yards, 7:12.**
- CHI – Allen Robinson 16-yard pass from Nick Foles (David Montgomery run), 1:35. Colts 19–11. **Drive: 8 plays, 90 yards, 2:12.**

**Top passers**

- IND – Philip Rivers – 16/29, 190 yards, TD
- CHI – Nick Foles – 26/42, 249 yards, TD, INT

**Top rushers**

- IND – Jonathan Taylor – 17 rushes, 68 yards
- CHI – David Montgomery – 10 rushes, 27 yards

**Top receivers**

- IND – Zach Pascal – 3 receptions, 58 yards
- CHI – Allen Robinson – 7 receptions, 101 yards, TD

Week 4 saw the Bears welcome the 2–1 Indianapolis Colts, who led the series 24–19 and won the latest meeting 29–23 in 2016, though the Bears won the last game in Chicago 41–21 in 2012; Bears defensive coordinator Chuck Pagano was the Colts' head coach in both of those games. A day before the game, Tyler Bray was activated from the practice squad; under the new collective bargaining agreement, two practice squad players could be temporarily promoted to the 53-man roster without making a corresponding move. Bray had also occasionally received a protected designation to prevent other teams from signing him off the practice roster. Bray, Hambright, McCullers, Pierce, Ridley, and defensive back Sherrick McManis were inactive; McManis, a special teams expert, was hurt in the Atlanta game. Fuller served as team captain.

The Bears punted on the opening drive, but O'Donnell's punt was partially blocked by Jordan Glasgow and traveled 18 yards to the Colts' 41-yard line. The first three plays of the Colts' first series ended with penalties, but Philip Rivers eventually completed a 13-yard touchdown to Mo Alie-Cox. During the first quarter, Mack dropped a potential interception on an errant Rivers pass after Barkevious Mingo hit him as he threw; the drive, as would three others (two for each team), would end with a punt. Chicago's offense began the second quarter at their own seven, where Foles led an 84-yard drive that culminated in a 27-yard field goal by Santos. The Colts answered with two Rodrigo Blankenship field goals of 21 and 30 yards, though the first was set up when Roquan Smith intercepted Rivers in the end zone at the three-yard line but was ruled out of bounds. The first four series of the second half concluded in punts, followed by a Blankenship 44-yard kick. Two punts later, Foles was intercepted by Julian Blackmon, which led to a fourth field goal by Blankenship on a 30-yarder. Down 19–3, the Bears drove 90 yards for a 16-yard touchdown from Foles to Robinson, while Montgomery ran for the two-point conversion. However, former Bear Trey Burton recovered the ensing onside kick to secure the Chicago defeat.

Foles ended his first start as a Bear with 26 of 42 passes for 249 yards, a touchdown, and an interception. After recording at least 130 rushing yards in each of the first three games, the Bears had just 28 against the fourth-ranked Colts run defense. The defensive performance, which saw a season-low 18 first downs and 289 yards allowed, drew parallels to the 2019 loss to the Los Angeles Chargers, where they allowed the fewest first downs and run yardage of the year against a Rivers-led offense but lost. Nagy regarded the loss as "a tough game to be a part of. Offensively, we know that we've got to be a lot better. Eleven points doesn't do it."

Running back Lamar Miller, a 2019 Pro Bowler, was signed to the practice squad a day after the game; to make room for him, Stephen Denmark was released.

==== Week 5: vs. Tampa Bay Buccaneers ====
Week Five: Tampa Bay Buccaneers at Chicago Bears – Game summary

Quarter	1	2	3	4	Total
Buccaneers	10	3	3	3	**19**
**Bears**	0	14	0	6	**20**

at Soldier Field, Chicago, Illinois

- Date: October 8
- Game time: 7:20 p.m. CDT
- Game weather: Clear, 57 °F (14 °C)
- Game attendance: 0
- Referee: Alex Kemp
- TV announcers (Fox/NFLN/Amazon Prime): Joe Buck, Troy Aikman, Erin Andrews and Kristina Pink
- Recap, Game Book

Game information

**First quarter**

- TB – Ryan Succop 39-yard field goal, 9:48. Buccaneers 3–0. **Drive: 11 plays, 54 yards, 5:12.**
- TB – Mike Evans 2-yard pass from Tom Brady (Ryan Succop kick), 0:56. Buccaneers 10–0. **Drive: 5 plays, 50 yards, 2:31.**

**Second quarter**

- TB – Ryan Succop 35-yard field goal, 7:03. Buccaneers 13–0. **Drive: 13 plays, 73 yards, 6:56.**
- CHI – David Montgomery 3-yard run (Cairo Santos kick), 1:48. Buccaneers 13–7. **Drive: 10 plays, 75 yards, 5:15.**
- CHI – Jimmy Graham 12-yard pass from Nick Foles (Cairo Santos kick), 0:36. Bears 14–13. **Drive: 4 plays, 27 yards, 0:55.**

**Third quarter**

- TB – Ryan Succop 46-yard field goal, 9:04. Buccaneers 16–14. **Drive: 5 plays, 40 yards, 3:11.**

**Fourth quarter**

- CHI – Cairo Santos 47-yard field goal, 10:34. Bears 17–16. **Drive: 12 plays, 59 yards, 7:13.**
- TB – Ryan Succop 25-yard field goal, 4:49. Buccaneers 19–17. **Drive: 10 plays, 66 yards, 5:45.**
- CHI – Cairo Santos 38-yard field goal, 1:113. Bears 20–19. **Drive: 9 plays, 32 yards, 1:08.**

**Top passers**

- TB – Tom Brady – 25/41, 253 yards, TD
- CHI – Nick Foles – 30/42, 243 yards, TD, INT

**Top rushers**

- TB – Ronald Jones – 17 rushes, 106 yards
- CHI – David Montgomery – 10 rushes, 29 yards, TD

**Top receivers**

- TB – Cameron Brate – 5 receptions, 44 yards
- CHI – Allen Robinson – 10 receptions, 90 yards

The Bears hosted the 3–1 Tampa Bay Buccaneers on Thursday Night Football in Week 5. Chicago had the better record in all-time meetings at 39–20, including a 48–10 home win in 2018; the 2020 game was also the teams' first non-Sunday meeting since the Bears won 27–0 on Saturday in 1991, and the first non-weekend matchup since a 23–0 Chicago victory in 1980. Bond was temporarily activated from the practice squad for the game. Bush, Trevis Gipson, Hambright, McCullers, McManis, and Ridley were inactive; McManis and Bush missed the game with hamstring injuries. Woods was the Bears' captain and won the team's first coin toss of the season.

Ryan Succop scored the first points of the game with a 36-yard field goal on the Buccaneers' opening drive. After two punts, Foles' pass for Robinson deflected off the receiver's hands and into Tampa's Carlton Davis for the interception. The takeaway set up a two-yard touchdown pass from Tom Brady to Mike Evans. Following another Bears punt, Succop added a 35-yard field goal in the second quarter, a 73-yard series that was aided by facemask and pass interference penalties on Fuller and Johnson. The Bears responded with a three-yard touchdown run by Montgomery, the team's first rushing score of the season, followed by Fuller forcing a fumble after hitting Ke'Shawn Vaughn and knocking the ball free, which Quinn recovered at the Buccaneers' 27-yard line. Chicago capitalized on the turnover with Foles' 12-yard touchdown throw to Graham, who caught the pass with one hand over Jamel Dean to give the Bears the 14–13 lead at halftime. The two teams would trade field goals and the lead in the second half: Succop's 46-yarder was the lone score in the third quarter, which Santos responded on a 47-yard kick, followed by Succop's 25-yard attempt, then Santos' go-ahead score from 38 yards with 1:13 remaining. On their final drive, the Buccaneers reached the Bears' 41-yard line, but Houston-Carson broke up Brady's fourth-down pass to Brate to secure the 20–19 Chicago win.

The victory improved the Bears to 4–1, their best start since 2012. It was also Chicago's first win over Brady in six tries; Brady had entered the game with a 109.2 passer rating and 14 touchdowns to four interceptions against Chicago.

The following day, kicker Kai Forbath was signed to the practice squad after Bond was placed on injured reserve; Forbath made all ten of his field goal attempts with the 2019 Dallas Cowboys. On Saturday, Badara Traore was moved to the reserve/COVID-19 list. Guard James Daniels suffered a pectoral muscle injury in the game and was placedo on injured reserve on October 14; practice squad lineman Sam Mustipher was promoted to take his place.

==== Week 6: at Carolina Panthers ====
Week Six: Chicago Bears at Carolina Panthers – Game summary

Quarter	1	2	3	4	Total
**Bears**	7	6	7	3	**23**
Panthers	3	3	0	10	**16**

at Bank of America Stadium, Charlotte, North Carolina

- Date: October 18
- Game time: 1:00 p.m. EDT/12:00 p.m. CDT
- Game weather: Sunny, 63 °F (17 °C)
- Game attendance: 5,240
- Referee: Adrian Hill
- TV announcers (Fox): Kenny Albert, Jonathan Vilma and Shannon Spake
- Recap, Game Book

Game information

**First quarter**

- CHI – Cole Kmet 9-yard pass from Nick Foles (Cairo Santos kick), 11:40. Bears 7–0. **Drive: 3 plays, 7 yards, 1:36.**
- CAR – Joey Slye 21-yard field goal, 5:07. Bears 7–3. **Drive: 14 plays, 72 yards, 6:33.**

**Second quarter**

- CHI – Cairo Santos 31-yard field goal, 8:09. Bears 10–3. **Drive: 11 plays, 48 yards, 5:58.**
- CAR – Joey Slye 20-yard field goal, 2:00. Bears 10–6. **Drive: 13 plays, 73 yards, 6:09.**
- CHI – Cairo Santos 55-yard field goal, 0:02. Bears 13–6. **Drive: 9 plays, 38 yards, 1:58.**

**Third quarter**

- CHI – Nick Foles 1-yard run (Cairo Santos kick), 1:44. Bears 20–6. **Drive: 10 plays, 56 yards, 4:29.**

**Fourth quarter**

- CAR – Mike Davis 1-yard run (Joey Slye kick), 13:11. Bears 20–13. **Drive: 9 plays, 75 yards, 3:33.**
- CHI – Cairo Santos 31-yard field goal, 9:19. Bears 23–13. **Drive: 10 plays, 62 yards, 3:52.**
- CAR – Joey Slye 48-yard field goal, 7:46. Bears 23–16. **Drive: 5 plays, 35 yards, 1:33.**

**Top passers**

- CHI – Nick Foles – 23/39, 198 yards, TD, INT
- CAR – Teddy Bridgewater – 16/29, 216 yards, 2 INT

**Top rushers**

- CHI – David Montgomery – 19 rushes, 58 yards
- CAR – Mike Davis – 18 rushes, 52 yards, TD

**Top receivers**

- CHI – Allen Robinson – 5 receptions, 53 yards
- CAR – D. J. Moore – 5 receptions, 93 yards

In their first game at Bank of America Stadium since a 31–24 loss in 2014, the Bears visited the 3–2 Carolina Panthers; the Bears held the 6–4 all-time edge and won the latest game 17–3 in 2017. On Friday, Jenkins was activated from injured reserve and McCullers was reassigned to the practice squad. Bush, Trevis Gipson, Hambright, Ridley, and Shelley were inactive.

After the Panthers received to start the game, their drive ended after three plays when Teddy Bridgewater's pass was tipped by Johnson and intercepted by Tashaun Gipson. The Bears took advantage with Foles' nine-yard touchdown pass to Kmet for the rookie's first career score. Outside of two punts and a kickoff return on the final play, every drive in the first half would end in a field goal: Joey Slye made kicks of 21 and 20 yards, while Santos converted 31- and 55-yard field goals; the 55-yarder was a career best for Santos. Following a Bears punt to start the second half, the two teams traded turnovers when Mike Davis was stripped by Jackson and Hicks recovered the fumble, but Foles' throw for Harris was intercepted by Jeremy Chinn on the next play. Another turnover nearly occurred a play later when Fuller deflected Brigewater's pass for Robby Anderson and Jackson returned it for a 17-yard interception touchdown, but Fuller received a pass interference penalty. Slye would miss a 54-yard attempt wide right on the drive. Chicago scored its first third-quarter points of the year on a one-yard quarterback sneak by Foles, which was followed by a one-yard touchdown run by Davis early in the final period. Santos and Slye exchanged field goals of 31 and 48 yards, respectively to make the score 23–16 in the Bears' favor; After the Panthers turned over the ball on downs and the Bears punted with 1:40 remaining, Bridgewater's throw to D. J. Moore was intercepted by Houston-Carson to secure the Chicago win; it was Houston-Carson's first NFL interception.

The victory improved the Bears to 5–1, their best such start since 2012, and a 3–0 record in away games for the first time since 2006. In his conference, Foles noted the team was "not going to get complacent" about the record, especially with the close victories while his 70.3 passer rating was his third-worst since 2018, but added that he would rather "win ugly" than "lose pretty" as "great teams find a way to win a game. Bad teams win with prettiness."

Two days after the game, Forbath was signed by the Los Angeles Rams to their active roster. Linebacker Manti Te'o, who spent 2019 with the New Orleans Saints, was signed to fill the void on the practice squad.

==== Week 7: at Los Angeles Rams ====
Week Seven: Chicago Bears at Los Angeles Rams – Game summary

Quarter	1	2	3	4	Total
Bears	0	3	0	7	**10**
**Rams**	7	3	14	0	**24**

at SoFi Stadium, Inglewood, California

- Date: October 26
- Game time: 7:15 p.m. CDT/5:15 p.m. PDT
- Game weather: Cloudy, 71 °F (22 °C)
- Game attendance: 0
- Referee: Bill Vinovich
- TV announcers (ESPN): Steve Levy, Brian Griese, Louis Riddick, Lisa Salters and John Parry
- Recap, Game Book

Game information

**First quarter**

- LAR – Josh Reynolds 4-yard pass from Jared Goff (Sam Sloman kick), 3:57. Rams 7–0. **Drive: 7 plays, 52 yards, 2:38.**

**Second quarter**

- CHI – Cairo Santos 42-yard field goal, 14:13. Rams 7–3. **Drive: 8 plays, 58 yards, 4:44.**
- LAR – Sam Sloman 22-yard field goal, 4:55. Rams 10–3. **Drive: 6 plays, 58 yards, 3:10.**

**Third quarter**

- LAR – Malcolm Brown 1-yard run (Sam Sloman kick), 8:06. Rams 17–3. **Drive: 7 plays, 55 yards, 2:21.**
- LAR – Gerald Everett 12-yard pass from Jared Goff (Sam Sloman kick), 1:34. Rams 24–3. **Drive: 8 plays, 80 yards, 3:33.**

**Fourth quarter**

- CHI – Eddie Jackson 8-yard fumble return (Cairo Santos kick), 7:30. Rams 24–10.

**Top passers**

- CHI – Nick Foles – 28/40, 261 yards, 2 INT
- LAR – Jared Goff – 23/33, 219 yards, 2 TD

**Top rushers**

- CHI – David Montgomery – 14 rushes, 48 yards
- LAR – Darrell Henderson – 15 rushes, 64 yards

**Top receivers**

- CHI – Jimmy Graham – 5 receptions, 31 yards
- LAR – Cooper Kupp – 5 receptions, 43 yards

For the second consecutive year, the Bears played on the road against the 4–2 Rams, having lost the 2019 meeting 17–7; Chicago led the all-time series 54–37–3. Christian, who played just one game with the Jets, returned to the Bears' practice squad on Friday, while Finch was released and Traore was reactivated from the reserve/COVID-19 list. A day later, Michael Joseph was moved from injured reserve to reserve/COVID-19. Trevis Gipson, Hambright, McManis, Pierce, and Ridley were inactive.

After three punts to begin the game, the Rams struck first on Jared Goff's four-yard touchdown pass to Josh Reynolds. The Bears answered with a 42-yard field goal by Santos, set up by a 38-yard pass from Foles to Kmet. An exchange of punts led to Sam Sloman's 22-yard kick that made the score 10–3 in Los Angeles' favor at halftime. The Rams punted to start the second half, but the Bears did the same after starting their ensuing series on their own one-yard line; Foles missed an open Mooney on third down after facing pressure from Jachai Polite. Malcolm Brown's one-yard touchdown run put the Rams up by 14. Although Chicago reached Los Angeles' nine-yard line on the following drive, Foles' pass to Mooney was tipped by Troy Hill and intercepted by Taylor Rapp, which the Rams capitalized on with a 12-yard touchdown throw from Goff to Gerald Everett. After the Bears turned the ball over on downs on their own 34, Sloman's 48-yard kick was blocked by Roy Robertson-Harris. Although Chicago reached Los Angeles' four on their next possession and Foles was sacked by Justin Hollins on fourth down, they finally scored three plays later when Quinn stripped Robert Woods and Jackson recovered, returning the fumble for an eight-yard score. The Rams punted again and forced the Bears to start at their six, and Foles was intercepted by Jalen Ramsey; another Los Angeles punt pinned Chicago at the five, where they gained 29 yards before suffering a turnover on downs.

The Bears failed to score an offensive touchdown for the first time in 2020, while the top-ranked red zone defense allowed three scores from such positions against the Rams.

==== Week 8: vs. New Orleans Saints ====
Week Eight: New Orleans Saints at Chicago Bears – Game summary

Quarter	1	2	3	4	OT	Total
**Saints**	3	7	6	7	3	**26**
Bears	3	10	0	10	0	**23**

at Soldier Field, Chicago, Illinois

- Date: November 1
- Game time: 3:25 p.m. CST
- Game weather: Partly cloudy, 40 °F (4 °C)
- Game attendance: 0
- Referee: Tony Corrente
- TV announcers (Fox): Joe Buck, Troy Aikman and Erin Andrews
- Recap, Game Book

Game information

**First quarter**

- NO – Wil Lutz 38-yard field goal, 8:13. Saints 3–0. **Drive: 12 plays, 55 yards, 6:47.**
- CHI – Cairo Santos 44-yard field goal, 1:13. Tied 3–3. **Drive: 14 plays, 49 yards, 7:00.**

**Second quarter**

- CHI – Allen Robinson 24-yard pass from Nick Foles (Cairo Santos kick), 8:10. Bears 10–3. **Drive: 4 plays, 80 yards, 2:28.**
- CHI – Cairo Santos 29-yard field goal, 1:39. Bears 13–3. **Drive: 7 plays, 50 yards, 2:13.**
- NO – Jared Cook 16-yard pass from Drew Brees (Wil Lutz kick), 0:03. Bears 13–10. **Drive: 9 plays, 68 yards, 1:36.**

**Third quarter**

- NO – Wil Lutz 27-yard field goal, 9:19. Tied 13–13. **Drive: 4 plays, 7 yards, 1:32.**
- NO – Wil Lutz 39-yard field goal, 5:04. Saints 16–13. **Drive: 8 plays, 19 yards, 3:30.**

**Fourth quarter**

- NO – Taysom Hill 20-yard pass from Drew Brees (Wil Lutz kick), 9:57. Saints 23–13. **Drive: 7 plays, 64 yards, 4:14.**
- CHI – Darnell Mooney 3-yard pass from Nick Foles (Cairo Santos kick), 3:32. Saints 23–20. **Drive: 11 plays, 75 yards, 6:25.**
- CHI – Cairo Santos 51-yard field goal, 0:13. Tied 23–23. **Drive: 12 plays, 35 yards, 1:38.**

**Overtime**

- NO – Wil Lutz 35-yard field goal, 1:36. Saints 26–23. **Drive: 7 plays, 52 yards, 2:12.**

**Top passers**

- NO – Drew Brees – 31/41, 280 yards, 2 TD
- CHI – Nick Foles – 28/41, 272 yards, 2 TD, INT

**Top rushers**

- NO – Alvin Kamara – 12 rushes, 67 yards
- CHI – David Montgomery – 21 rushes, 89 yards

**Top receivers**

- NO – Alvin Kamara – 9 receptions, 96 yards
- CHI – Allen Robinson – 6 receptions, 87 yards, TD

In Week 8, the Bears hosted the 4–2 New Orleans Saints, who led the series 16–15 after winning the 2019 game in Chicago 36–25 and had won the last five meetings. On Tuesday, the team signed receiver and return specialist Dwayne Harris, who spent 2019 with the Oakland Raiders, to the practice squad; Beckner was released to accommodate the addition. The day before the game, Harris was elevated to the active roster. Starting center Cody Whitehair was inactive due to a calf injury, as were Ginn, Trevis Gipson, Pierce, Ridley, and Shelley.

Wil Lutz and Santos traded 38- and 44-yard field goals on their teams' opening drives; the Bears' first series saw a Foles incomplete pass to Montgomery be initially ruled as a fumble recovered by New Orleans' Sheldon Rankins before being overturned and Trubisky briefly return as a Wildcat formation quarterback. After Lutz's 27-yard attempt hit the upright, the Bears traveled 80 yards with Foles' 50-yard completion to Mooney and 24-yard score to Robinson. Three more punts led to a Santos 29-yard kick that was set up by a 38-yard run by Montgomery. However, the Saints responded with Drew Brees' 16-yard touchdown pass to Jared Cook with three seconds remaining in the first half. New Orleans scored ten unanswered points on their first two possessions: Deonte Harris returned an O'Donnell punt 42 yards to the Bears' 16-yard line and Lutz made a 27-yard field goal; Foles threw an interception to Marshon Lattimore, a play after Wims was ejected for inciting a brawl after punching C. J. Gardner-Johnson; and Lutz converted a 38-yarder. The Saints made the score 23–13 early in the final period on a 20-yard touchdown throw from Brees to Taysom Hill. With 3:32 remaining, Foles completed a three-yard score to Mooney, followed by Santos' 51-yard field goal to tie the game with 13 seconds left and force overtime. Although the Saints punted on their first overtime drive, a pair of drops and a sack forced Chicago to do the same. Brees led a seven-play, 52-yard drive that ended with Lutz's game-winning 35-yard kick.

The loss marked the Bears' third overtime defeat in the Nagy era (winless in such games), and the first since 2018. The game also saw the Bears' seventh third quarter in which they failed to score as their three offensive drives ended with two punts and an interception. Nagy noted after the game that Wims later apologized for the fight; a day later, Wims accused Gardner-Johnson of spitting on him while the cornerback was filmed pulling out Wims' mouthpiece and poking Miller in the face, though Gardner-Johnson declined comment. Wims was suspended for two games without pay. Ginn was released later in the week.

==== Week 9: at Tennessee Titans ====
Week Nine: Chicago Bears at Tennessee Titans – Game summary

Quarter	1	2	3	4	Total
Bears	0	0	0	17	**17**
**Titans**	3	7	7	7	**24**

at Nissan Stadium, Nashville, Tennessee

- Date: November 8
- Game time: 12:00 p.m. CST
- Game weather: Sunny, 77 °F (25 °C)
- Game attendance: 13,871
- Referee: Ronald Torbert
- TV announcers (Fox): Dick Stockton, Greg Jennings and Laura Okmin
- Recap, Game Book

Game information

**First quarter**

- TEN – Stephen Gostkowski 40-yard field goal, 4:22. Titans 3–0. **Drive: 8 plays, 56 yards, 4:09.**

**Second quarter**

- TEN – A. J. Brown 40-yard pass from Ryan Tannehill (Stephen Gostkowski kick), 4:39. Titans 10–0. **Drive: 12 plays, 91 yards, 6:10.**

**Third quarter**

- TEN – Desmond King 63-yard fumble return (Stephen Gostkowski kick), 4:41. Titans 17–0.

**Fourth quarter**

- CHI – Cairo Santos 22-yard field goal, 12:30. Titans 17–3. **Drive: 15 plays, 63 yards, 7:11.**
- TEN – Jonnu Smith 2-yard pass from Ryan Tannehill (Stephen Gostkowski kick), 8:10. Titans 24–3. **Drive: 7 plays, 76 yards, 4:20.**
- CHI – Ryan Nall 6-yard pass from Nick Foles (Cairo Santos kick), 5:06. Titans 24–10. **Drive: 9 plays, 75 yards, 3:04.**
- CHI – Jimmy Graham 8-yard pass from Nick Foles (Cairo Santos kick), 1:04. Titans 24–17. **Drive: 8 plays, 80 yards, 0:58.**

**Top passers**

- CHI – Nick Foles – 36/52, 335 yards, 2 TD
- TEN – Ryan Tannehill – 10/21, 158 yards, 2 TD

**Top rushers**

- CHI – David Montgomery – 14 rushes, 30 yards
- TEN – Derrick Henry – 21 rushes, 68 yards

**Top receivers**

- CHI – Allen Robinson – 7 receptions, 81 yards
- TEN – A. J. Brown – 4 receptions, 101 yards, TD

Chicago visited the 5–2 Tennessee Titans in Week 9. It was the 13th all-time meeting between the two and the sixth since the latter's move to Tennessee; the teams were tied 6–6 and the Titans won 27–21 in 2016, though the Bears had won all three games in Tennessee. During the week, the Bears performed a wave of transactions to address injuries and positive COVID-19 tests, with a season-high 13 players appearing on the injury report entering the game. On Tuesday, Massie, who hurt his knee on the opening drive in the Saints game, was placed on injured reserve; Germain Ifedi and Jason Spriggs were moved to the reserve/COVID-19 list; Lachavious Simmons was promoted from the practice squad to the active roster; and Aaron Neary, whose lone NFL appearance came in 2017 with the Rams, was added to the practice squad. Although Ifedi was cleared for the Titans game on Friday, Whitehair was placed on reserve/COVID-19 after testing positive. Bray and Bush also went on the list as close contacts of individuals who tested positive (the latter's case being Whitehair), though the former was subsequently removed. On Saturday, Bray, Harris, Eiselen, McCullers, and Traore were elevated from the practice squad. Jenkins (ankle), Mustipher, Robertson-Harris, and Trubisky (shoulder) were ruled out with injuries, while Simmons tested positive the morning of the game and Neary was activated from the squad. Trevis Gipson was also inactive for the game.

The Titans punted on their opening drive. Chicago's offense began its first series with a starting offensive line that was missing three starters and two backups, with Alex Bars and Hambright making their first starts. Although the unit reached the Titans' 34-yard line, a fourth-down run by Montgomery was stopped. The two teams traded punts before the Titans traveled 56 yards and Stephen Gostkowski made a 40-yard field goal. The rest of the first quarter's drives ended with punts. During the second quarter, the Bears successfully executed a fake punt in which Houston-Carson received the snap and handed off to Mingo, who ran for the first down; however, they eventually punted. On the ensuing series, Ryan Tannehill led a 91-yard drive that ended with a 40-yard touchdown pass to A. J. Brown. The game went scoreless for the rest of the first half and the first two possessions of the second. In the third quarter, Montgomery was stripped by Jeffery Simmons and Desmond King returned the fumble for a 63-yard touchdown. Chicago would not score until early in the fourth quarter on Santos' 22-yard field goal, which Tennessee responded with a 76-yard possession and a two-yard score from Tannehill to Jonnu Smith. The Bears' first touchdown came on a six-yard completion from Foles to Ryan Nall with five minutes remaining. After the Titans punted, Miller lost a fumble to Simmons after being stripped by Jayon Brown, though Tennessee would punt again. Graham's eight-yard touchdown reception with 1:04 to go reduced the margin to seven points, but Amani Hooker recovered the onside kick to end the game.

Despite playing against the NFL's worst-ranked defense in third-down situations, the Bears converted just 13.3 percent of plays on such downs (2 of 15) and failed to reach the red zone until the fourth quarter. In contrast, the defense set season bests in yardage (228) and first downs (11) allowed, while Titans running back Derrick Henry, who led the league in rushing yards, was limited to 68 yards.

==== Week 10: vs. Minnesota Vikings ====
Week Ten: Minnesota Vikings at Chicago Bears – Game summary

Quarter	1	2	3	4	Total
**Vikings**	7	0	6	6	**19**
Bears	3	3	7	0	**13**

at Soldier Field, Chicago, Illinois

- Date: November 16
- Game time: 7:15 p.m. CST
- Game weather: Clear, 44 °F (7 °C)
- Game attendance: 0
- Referee: Scott Novak
- TV announcers (ESPN): Steve Levy, Brian Griese, Louis Riddick, Lisa Salters and John Parry
- Recap, Game Book

Game information

**First quarter**

- MIN – Adam Thielen 17-yard pass from Kirk Cousins (Dan Bailey kick), 6:29. Vikings 7–0. **Drive: 6 plays, 41 yards, 3:05.**
- CHI – Cairo Santos 23-yard field goal, 0:23. Vikings 7–3. **Drive: 14 plays, 70 yards, 5:57.**

**Second quarter**

- CHI – Cairo Santos 42-yard field goal, 0:49. Vikings 7–6. **Drive: 5 plays, 21 yards, 1:02.**

**Third quarter**

- CHI – Cordarrelle Patterson 104-yard kickoff return (Cairo Santos kick), 14:46. Bears 13–7.
- MIN – Dan Bailey 37-yard field goal, 10:50. Bears 13–10. **Drive: 4 plays, 1 yard, 0:54.**
- MIN – Dan Bailey 43-yard field goal, 1:52. Tied 13–13. **Drive: 7 plays, 60 yards, 3:20.**

**Fourth quarter**

- MIN – Adam Thielen 6-yard pass from Kirk Cousins (pass failed), 10:06. Vikings 19–13. **Drive: 9 plays, 63 yards, 4:43.**

**Top passers**

- MIN – Kirk Cousins – 25/36, 292 yards, 2 TD, INT
- CHI – Nick Foles – 15/26, 106 yards, INT

**Top rushers**

- MIN – Dalvin Cook – 30 rushes, 96 yards
- CHI – Cordarrelle Patterson – 12 rushes, 30 yards

**Top receivers**

- MIN – Justin Jefferson – 8 receptions, 135 yards
- CHI – Allen Robinson – 6 receptions, 43 yards

The Bears' first game of 2020 against the Minnesota Vikings came on Monday Night Football; the Vikings led the rivalry 60–56–6 and won the last meeting on MNF 20–17 in 2017, but the Bears had swept them in the last two seasons. With Chicago's offense struggling through the first nine games, being ranked 31st in yards per play and 29th in points per game, Nagy relinquished play calling duties to Bill Lazor beginning with Week 10. The team's roster moves during the week included signing former Eagles defensive tackle Anthony Rush to the active roster, adding ex-Vikings quarterback Kyle Sloter and former Bears lineman Eric Kush to the practice squad, releasing Neary, placing Robertson-Harris on injured reserve after he hurt his shoulder in Tennessee, and activating Bush and Spriggs from the reserve/COVID-19 list. On the day of the game, Whitehair was activated from reserve/COVID-19, while Bray, Kush, McCullers, and Lamar Miller were elevated from the practice squad. Montgomery, who suffered a concussion against the Titans, missed the game; Jenkins, McManis, Mustipher, Rush, Trubisky, and Trevis Gipson were also inactive.

On the Vikings' opening drive, Trevathan stripped Kyle Rudolph and Tashaun Gipson recovered for Rudolph's first career lost fumble. However, the Bears lost the ball two plays later when Foles' pass for Anthony Miller was deflected and intercepted by Harrison Smith, which set up Kirk Cousins' 17-yard touchdown pass to Adam Thielen. Santos kicked a 23-yard field goal later in the opening quarter. Minnesota's next series reached Chicago's 17, where Mack intercepted a tipped pass off Thielen and returned it 33 yards. Santos would add another field goal, a 42-yarder, to end the first half. Cordarrelle Patterson returned the second-half opening kickoff for a 104-yard touchdown that gave the Bears the lead, which enabled him to tie the NFL record for most kickoff returns in a career (eight) and surpass Gale Sayers' 103-yard score in 1967 for the longest kick return in Bears history. Although the defense forced a punt on the ensuing drive, Harris muffed the return and Minnesota's Josh Metellus recovered at the Bears' 20. Dan Bailey would make a 37-yard field goal. Three punts later, Bailey converted a 43-yarder later in the quarter on a drive assisted by a 54-yard completion from Cousins to Justin Jefferson. When the Bears punted again to start the fourth quarter, the Vikings traveled 63 yards before scoring on a six-yard touchdown pass to Thielen. A poor snap led to an aborted pass from Britton Colquitt to Rudolph that was incomplete. The Bears failed to score for the rest of the game, with their last two drives ending with turnovers on down. The final series saw Foles suffer an injury and be replaced by Bray, who completed an 18-yard pass to Nall on his first throw before his next three passes (excluding a spike to stop the clock) fell incomplete.

In addition to failing to score an offensive touchdown for the second time in 2020, the offense recorded a season-worst 149 yards even though Minnesota's defense was allowing 412.9 yards per game. Although the defense limited Dalvin Cook to just 96 rushing yards, they allowed the Vikings to convert eight of 15 attempts on third down despite being the best-ranked defense on such downs.

==== Week 11: Bye week ====
The Bears entered the bye week at a 5–5 record after starting the season 5–1. Due to injuries, the bye arrived at what Nagy called "a good time for us. We're a little bit beat up right now, so we need to be able to get some guys back and get healthy."

Statistically, the offense struggled through the first nine games as it was ranked 31st in total offense and points, 32nd in rushing, and 25th in passing. Conversely, the defense was the seventh-best in points allowed. This deviation in success between the two units was described by ESPN.com writer Jeff Dickerson as the team having "a championship-level defense and a Pop Warner offense."

During the week, Harris was placed on injured reserve after tearing his triceps muscle in the Vikings game. To fill the void at punt returner, the Bears claimed receiver DeAndre Carter off waivers; Carter averaged 8.7 return yards on 11 punt returns and 20.8 yards on 12 kickoffs with the Houston Texans in 2020. Simmons was activated from the reserve/COVID-19 list on November 20, while Rush was waived four days later.

==== Week 12: at Green Bay Packers ====
Week Twelve: Chicago Bears at Green Bay Packers – Game summary

Quarter	1	2	3	4	Total
Bears	3	7	0	15	**25**
**Packers**	6	21	14	0	**41**

at Lambeau Field, Green Bay, Wisconsin

- Date: November 29
- Game time: 7:20 p.m. CST
- Game weather: Clear, 39 °F (4 °C)
- Game attendance: 500
- Referee: Clete Blakeman
- TV announcers (NBC): Mike Tirico, Tony Dungy, Kathryn Tappen, and Terry McAulay
- Recap, Game Book

Game information

**First quarter**

- GB – Davante Adams 12-yard pass from Aaron Rodgers (kick failed), 7:22. Packers 6–0. **Drive: 14 plays, 75 yards, 7:38.**
- CHI – Cairo Santos 27-yard field goal, 5:14. Packers 6–3. **Drive: 6 plays, 59 yards, 2:08.**

**Second quarter**

- GB – Marcedes Lewis 5-yard pass from Aaron Rodgers (Mason Crosby kick), 14:55. Packers 13–3. **Drive: 9 plays, 75 yards, 5:19.**
- GB – Allen Lazard 2-yard pass from Aaron Rodgers (Mason Crosby kick), 4:34. Packers 20–3. **Drive: 13 plays, 80 yards, 7:50.**
- GB – Preston Smith 14-yard fumble return (Mason Crosby kick), 3:11. Packers 27–3.
- CHI – Allen Robinson 1-yard pass from Mitchell Trubisky (Cairo Santos kick), 0:19. Packers 27–10. **Drive: 14 plays, 87 yards, 2:52.**

**Third quarter**

- GB – Robert Tonyan 39-yard pass from Aaron Rodgers (Mason Crosby kick), 6:30. Packers 34–10. **Drive: 4 plays, 53 yards, 2:15.**
- GB – Jamaal Williams 13-yard run (Mason Crosby kick), 1:12. Packers 41–10. **Drive: 9 plays, 66 yards, 4:57.**

**Fourth quarter**

- CHI – Allen Robinson 6-yard pass from Mitchell Trubisky (Cairo Santos), 11:48. Packers 41–17. **Drive: 13 plays, 65 yards, 4:24.**
- CHI – David Montgomery 3-yard pass from Mitchell Trubisky (Mitchell Trubisky to Darnell Mooney pass), 3:21. Packers 41–25. **Drive: 15 plays, 82 yards, 5:16.**

**Top passers**

- CHI – Mitchell Trubisky – 26/46, 242 yards, 3 TD, 2 INT
- GB – Aaron Rodgers – 21/29, 211 yards, 4 TD

**Top rushers**

- CHI – David Montgomery – 11 rushes, 103 yards
- GB – Aaron Jones – 17 rushes, 90 yards

**Top receivers**

- CHI – Allen Robinson – 8 receptions, 74 yards, 2 TD
- GB – Davante Adams – 6 receptions, 61 yards, TD

The Bears' first game of the season against the longtime rival Green Bay Packers came in Week 12; the Packers led the series 99–95–6 and had won every meeting in Lambeau Field since 2016. With Foles out due to his hip injury, Trubisky returned as the starter for the game, while Bray was activated to serve as the backup. Jackson was briefly placed on the reserve/COVID-19 list during the week. In addition to Foles, Hicks missed the game with a hamstring injury; McManis, Simmons, Wims, and Trevis Gipson were also inactive.

The Bears fell behind early when Aaron Rodgers threw a 12-yard touchdown pass to Davante Adams, but Mason Crosby missed the extra point wide right. Chicago's offense responded with a 57-yard run by Montgomery to Green Bay's eight-yard line, but he was stopped for a one-yard loss on the next play and two incomplete passes led to Santos' 27-yard field goal. The Packers would score 21 unanswered points in the second quarter on Rodgers' five-yard pass to Marcedes Lewis, Trubisky's pass to Mooney was intercepted by Darnell Savage in the end zone to set up an 80-yard drive that ended on Rodgers' two-yard score to Allen Lazard On the next series, Trubisky was strip-sacked by Za'Darius Smith and Preston Smith picked up the loose ball for a scoop and score from 14 yards out. On the Bears' ensuing drive, Trubisky led an 87-yard series that ended on a one-yard touchdown pass to Robinson with 19 seconds remaining in the first half. The Bears went three-and-out on their first two drives of the second half. On their third drive, Trubisky was picked off by Savage again, leading to a 39-yard touchdown pass from Rodgers to Robert Tonyan. Green Bay increased their leas to 41–10 when Jamaal Williams' scored on a 13-yard touchdown run. In the fourth quarter, the Bears scored two garbage time touchdowns with a pair of Trubisky TD passes to Robinson and Montgomery, including a two-point conversion to Mooney to make the score 41-26. With 3:21 left, Santos' onside kick was recovered by Adams and the Packers were able to run out the clock.

In addition to going winless in November for the third time in the last five years, the loss marked the Bears' seventh consecutive season in which they lost a game coming off their bye week. The Bears' 41 points allowed were the most since a 41–21 defeat in 2016 to the Washington Redskins. Trubisky had a passer rating of 74.7, three touchdowns, two interceptions, and a lost fumble in his first game back as the starter. The defense struggled against the Packers offense, allowing Green Bay to convert all but one third down attempt in the first half and allowed them to convert all four red zone attempts despite being the best defenses in the red zone.

==== Week 13: vs. Detroit Lions ====
Week Thirteen: Detroit Lions at Chicago Bears – Game summary

Quarter	1	2	3	4	Total
**Lions**	6	7	7	14	**34**
Bears	9	14	0	7	**30**

at Soldier Field, Chicago, Illinois

- Date: December 6
- Game time: 12:00 p.m. CST
- Game weather: Cloudy, 35 °F (2 °C)
- Game attendance: 0
- Referee: Clay Martin
- TV announcers (Fox): Kevin Kugler, Chris Spielman, and Laura Okmin
- Recap, Game Book

Game information

**First quarter**

- CHI – Cairo Santos 45-yard field goal, 12:37. Bears 3–0. **Drive: 6 plays, 27 yards, 2:23.**
- CHI – David Montgomery 13-yard run (kick blocked), 6:13. Bears 9–0. **Drive: 6 plays, 71 yards, 3:16.**
- DET – Adrian Peterson 3-yard run (kick failed), 0:15. Bears 9–6. **Drive: 12 plays, 72 yards, 5:58.**

**Second quarter**

- CHI – Cordarrelle Patterson 5-yard run (Cairo Santos kick), 10:10. Bears 16–6. **Drive: 10 plays, 75 yards, 5:05.**
- DET – Quintez Cephus 49-yard pass from Matthew Stafford (Matt Prater kick), 2:22. Bears 16–13. **Drive: 4 plays, 72 yards, 1:58.**
- CHI – David Montgomery 4-yard run (Cairo Santos kick), 0:36. Bears 23–13. **Drive: 6 plays, 68 yards, 1:46.**

**Third quarter**

- DET – Jesse James 9-yard pass from Matthew Stafford (Matt Prater kick), 3:55. Bears 23–20. **Drive: 10 plays, 66 yards, 5:07.**

**Fourth quarter**

- CHI – Cole Kmet 11-yard pass from Mitchell Trubisky (Cairo Santos kick), 11:23. 'Bears 30–20. **Drive: 12 plays, 72 yards, 7:32.**
- DET – Marvin Jones 25-yard pass from Matthew Stafford (Matt Prater kick), 2:18. Bears 30–27. **Drive: 7 plays, 96 yards, 2:15.**
- DET – Adrian Peterson 5-yard run (Matt Prater kick), 1:37. Lions 34–30. **Drive: 2 plays, 7 yards, 0:11.**

**Top passers**

- DET – Matthew Stafford – 27/42, 402 yards, 3 TD, INT
- CHI – Mitchell Trubisky – 26/34, 267 yards, TD

**Top rushers**

- DET – Adrian Peterson – 16 rushes, 57 yards, 2 TD
- CHI – David Montgomery – 17 rushes, 72 yards, 2 TD

**Top receivers**

- DET – Marvin Jones – 8 receptions, 116 yards, TD
- CHI – Allen Robinson – 6 receptions, 75 yards

The Bears' second game against the Lions, this time led by interim head coach Darrell Bevell came in Week 13. Chicago won the last two meetings at Soldier Field and were 6–4 in such games in the 2010s. On Wednesday, ex-Cincinnati Bengals defensive lineman Tyler Clark was added to the practice squad. McCullers, Pierce, Ridley, Simmons, and James Vaughters were not active.

After Santos made a 45-yard field goal on the Bears' opening drive, Skrine tackled Jamal Agnew on fourth-and-one to force a turnover on downs. Montgomery and Peterson traded touchdown runs of 13 and three yards, respectively, though their teams' kickers missed the extra points (Santos' was blocked). Patterson scored on a five-yard touchdown run in the second quarter. After two punts, another exchange of touchdowns came as Quintez Cephus caught a 49-yard pass from Stafford, which the Bears answered on a four-yard run by Montgomery. The three first-half rushing touchdowns marked the first time the Bears accomplished the feat since 1990 against the Phoenix Cardinals. Two punts began the second half before Stafford found Jesse James on a nine-yard touchdown throw, which the Bears responded on Trubisky's 11-yard score to Kmet. Nichols intercepted Stafford on the ensuing drive for the first pick by a Bears defensive tackle since Tommie Harris in 2009 against Detroit, though his team failed to capitalize as the offense punted. In the fourth quarter, the Lions traveled 96 yards and scored on Stafford's 25-yard pass to Jones. On his team's 17-yard line, Trubisky was strip-sacked by Romeo Okwara and John Penisini recovered at the Bears' seven, which set up Peterson's five-yard touchdown run to give the Lions the 34–20 lead. Chicago attempted to rally and reached Detroit's 24, where Robinson went out of bounds a yard short of the first down on third down, which was followed by Montgomery being stopped on fourth down for a turnover.

The defeat marked Chicago's first six-game losing streak since 2002 and their longest such streak since they lost eight in a row between 2014 and 2015. While the offense tied their season-high four touchdowns, their first-half production of 253 yards and 17 first downs were reduced to 136 yards and nine first downs in the second. The defense's struggles also continued with a season-worst 460 yards allowed; it was also the unit's second consecutive game in which they allowed five touchdowns.

==== Week 14: vs. Houston Texans ====
Week Fourteen: Houston Texans at Chicago Bears – Game summary

Quarter	1	2	3	4	Total
Texans	0	7	0	0	**7**
**Bears**	7	23	3	3	**36**

at Soldier Field, Chicago, Illinois

- Date: December 13
- Game time: 12:00 p.m. CST
- Game weather: Partly cloudy, 34 °F (1 °C)
- Game attendance: 0
- Referee: Land Clark
- TV announcers (CBS): Kevin Harlan, Trent Green and Melanie Collins
- Recap, Game Book

Game information

**First quarter**

- CHI – David Montgomery 80-yard run (Cairo Santos kick), 10:04. Bears 7–0. **Drive: 1 play, 80 yards, 0:12.**

**Second quarter**

- CHI – Jimmy Graham 14-yard pass from Mitchell Trubisky (Cairo Santos kick), 12:57. Bears 14–0. **Drive: 12 plays, 79 yards, 6:46.**
- HOU – Keke Coutee 5-yard pass from Deshaun Watson (Kaʻimi Fairbairn kick), 8:37. Bears 14–7. **Drive: 8 plays, 86 yards, 4:20.**
- CHI – Deshaun Watson sacked in end zone by Khalil Mack, 6:04. Bears 16–7.
- CHI – Darnell Mooney 12-yard pass from Mitchell Trubisky (Cairo Santos kick), 3:22. Bears 23–7. **Drive: 5 plays, 66 yards, 2:42.**
- CHI – Allen Robinson 3-yard pass from Mitchell Trubisky (Cairo Santos kick), 0:08. Bears 30–7. **Drive: 11 plays, 77 yards, 1:37.**

**Third quarter**

- CHI – Cairo Santos 39-yard field goal, 10:37. Bears 33–7. **Drive: 7 plays, 56 yards, 4:23.**

**Fourth quarter**

- CHI – Cairo Santos 32-yard field goal, 10:47. Bears 36–7. **Drive: 8 plays, 28 yards, 4:13.**

**Top passers**

- HOU – Deshaun Watson – 21/30, 219 yards, TD
- CHI – Mitchell Trubisky – 24/33, 267 yards, 3 TD

**Top rushers**

- HOU – Buddy Howell – 11 rushes, 42 yards
- CHI – David Montgomery – 11 rushes, 113 yards, TD

**Top receivers**

- HOU – Chad Hansen – 7 receptions, 56 yards
- CHI – Allen Robinson – 9 receptions, 123 yards, TD

Chicago hosted the 4–8 Houston Texans in Week 14. Entering the game, the Bears had never beaten the Texans in four attempts, losing 23–14 at Houston in 2016 and 13–6 at home in 2012. During the week, Carter, London, Te'o, and Thomas Ives were placed on reserve/COVID-19, while Bond returned to the practice squad from injured reserve. Skrine and Vaughters missed the game with injuries, while McCullers and Simmons were inactive.

Following a Texans punt to begin the game, Montgomery scored an 80-yard touchdown run on his team's first offensive play. It was the Bears' first opening-play offensive touchdown since Rashaan Salaam's score in 1995 against the Buccaneers, and the fourth-longest run in team history. Although the Bears regained possession on a Mack fumble recovery after he and Hicks stripped Duke Johnson, they were forced to punt. After Houston also punted, Chicago traveled 79 yards on a drive that culminated in Trubisky's five-yard touchdown pass to Graham early in the second quarter. The Texans responded with Deshaun Watson throwing a five-yard touchdown of his own to Keke Coutee, but Watson was sacked by Mack in the end zone for a safety on Houston's next series. Trubisky threw two more touchdowns to Mooney (11 yards) and Robinson (three yards) to give the Bears a 30–7 lead at halftime. After Santos' 39-yard field goal to open the second half, the Texans reached the Bears' one-yard line where Watson's touchdown run was overturned. Watson suffered an injury on the next play, and backup quarterback A. J. McCarron was sacked by Roquan Smith on fourth down. Another Houston turnover on downs occurred on the final play of the third quarter when Edwards sacked Watson. Santos added a 32-yard field goal for the day's final points, while the last play of the game saw Watson be sacked again by Edwards.

Besides snapping a six-game losing streak, the victory was the Bears' largest since a 41–9 win over the Buffalo Bills in 2018. The defense recorded a season-high seven sacks, while the offense produced four touchdowns and 410 yards. Trubisky completed 24 of 33 passes for 267 yards and three touchdowns, resulting in a season-best passer rating of 126.7, while Montgomery's 113 rushing yards and 155 total yards were his most in 2020. Robinson's 123 receiving yards elevated him past 1,000 yards on the season for the second straight year.

==== Week 15: at Minnesota Vikings ====
Week Fifteen: Chicago Bears at Minnesota Vikings – Game summary

Quarter	1	2	3	4	Total
**Bears**	10	10	7	6	**33**
Vikings	7	3	10	7	**27**

at U.S. Bank Stadium, Minneapolis, Minnesota

- Date: December 20
- Game time: 12:00 p.m. CST
- Game weather: None (dome stadium)
- Game attendance: 0
- Referee: Shawn Smith
- TV announcers (Fox): Chris Myers, Greg Jennings and Jen Hale
- Recap, Game Book

Game information

**First quarter**

- CHI – Darnell Mooney 8-yard pass from Mitchell Trubisky (Cairo Santos kick), 9:01. Bears 7–0. **Drive: 5 plays, 58 yards, 2:07.**
- MIN – Adam Thielen 3-yard pass from Kirk Cousins (Dan Bailey kick), 4:46. Tied 7–7. **Drive: 8 plays, 75 yards, 4:15.**
- CHI – Cairo Santos 42-yard field goal, 1:16. Bears 10–7. **Drive: 8 plays, 51 yards, 3:30.**

**Second quarter**

- CHI – David Montgomery 1-yard run (Cairo Santos kick), 6:46. Bears 17–7. **Drive: 13 plays, 76 yards, 7:19.**
- CHI – Cairo Santos 35-yard field goal, 3:34. Bears 20–7. **Drive: 6 plays, 17 yards, 2:13.**
- MIN – Dan Bailey 24-yard field goal, 0:26. Bears 20–10. **Drive: 12 plays, 69 yards, 3:08.**

**Third quarter**

- MIN – Dalvin Cook 1-yard run (Dan Bailey kick), 10:54. Bears 20–17. **Drive: 8 plays, 75 yards, 4:06.**
- CHI – David Montgomery 14-yard run (Cairo Santos kick), 5:30. Bears 27–17. **Drive: 11 plays, 75 yards, 5:24.**
- MIN – Dan Bailey 22-yard field goal, 2:38. Bears 27–20. **Drive: 7 plays, 71 yards, 2:52.**

**Fourth quarter**

- CHI – Cairo Santos 48-yard field goal, 13:33. Bears 30–20. **Drive: 8 plays, 42 yards, 4:05.**
- MIN – Tyler Conklin 20-yard pass from Kirk Cousins (Dan Bailey kick), 8:05. Bears 30–27. **Drive: 11 plays, 75 yards, 5:28.**
- CHI – Cairo Santos 42-yard field goal, 0:56. Bears 33–27. **Drive: 4 plays, 5 yards, 0:58.**

**Top passers**

- CHI – Mitchell Trubisky – 15/21, 202 yards, TD, INT
- MIN – Kirk Cousins – 24/35, 271 yards, 2 TD, INT

**Top rushers**

- CHI – David Montgomery – 32 rushes, 146 yards, 2 TD
- MIN – Dalvin Cook – 24 rushes, 132 yards, TD

**Top receivers**

- CHI – Allen Robinson – 4 receptions, 83 yards
- MIN – Justin Jefferson – 8 receptions, 104 yards

The Bears' second game against the Vikings came in Minnesota, where the Bears won 21–19 in the 2019 edition. Both teams entered the game with 6–7 records and fighting for the NFC's seventh and final seed in the playoffs alongside the 7–6 Arizona Cardinals. Days before the game, Lamar Miller was signed off the practice squad by the Washington Football Team; Miller's lone game in Chicago was against the Vikings in Week 10. London and Te'o also returned to the practice squad from reserve/COVID-19. Skrine was once again inactive as he remained out with a concussion, while Johnson and Bush respectively hurt their shoulder and foot against Houston and missed the game; the injuries prompted the Bears to elevate Xavier Crawford from the practice squad. Pierce and Simmons were also not active.

The two teams traded punts to begin the game, followed by touchdown passes from Trubisky and Cousins to Mooney (eight yards) and Thielen (three yards), After Santos' 42-yard field goal gave the Bears the lead, Cousins was sacked by Quinn for the latter's first sack since Week 2. The Vikings punted and the Bears drove 76 yards en route to Montgomery's one-yard touchdown run. On Minnesota's next drive, Cook was stopped by Jenkins and Nichols on fourth down, resulting in a turnover on downs at the Vikings' 34-yard line. Santos increased the lead to 13 points on a 35-yard kick. The Vikings answered with ten unanswered points on Bailey's 24-yard field goal shortly before halftime, followed by Cook's one-yard touchdown run on the first drive of the second half. Chicago responded on a 75-yard possession that concluded with a 14-yard touchdown rush by Montgomery. A field goal exchange followed of 22 (Bailey) and 48 yards (Santos), and a 20-yard touchdown pass from Cousins to Tyler Conklin made the margin three points. Chicago's following drive reached Minnesota's six before Trubisky's pass for J. P. Holtz was intercepted by Cameron Dantzler in the end zone, though the Vikings turned the ball over on downs again at the two-minute warning. Santos' 42-yard field goal made the score 33–27 with 56 seconds remaining. The final drive of the game saw the Vikings reach the Bears' 33, where Cousins' Hail Mary pass was tipped by Jackson and intercepted by McManis.

The 33 points marked the third consecutive game in which the Bears scored at least 30 points, a streak that last occurred in 2013, while the team also had 20 first-half points for the third game in a row, a first since 1967. The offense recorded 199 rushing yards on 42 attempts, both the most under Nagy, while Montgomery's 32 carries for 146 yards were career highs; Montgomery also became the first Bears player to reach 100 rushing yards in consecutive games since Jordan Howard in 2016. Mooney had four catches in the game to reach 46 receptions on the year, surpassing Harlon Hill in 1954 for the most by a rookie in franchise history.

==== Week 16: at Jacksonville Jaguars ====
Week Sixteen: Chicago Bears at Jacksonville Jaguars – Game summary

Quarter	1	2	3	4	Total
**Bears**	7	6	21	7	**41**
Jaguars	3	7	0	7	**17**

at TIAA Bank Field, Jacksonville, Florida

- Date: December 27
- Game time: 1:00 p.m. EST/12:00 p.m. CST
- Game weather: Clear, 55 °F (13 °C)
- Game attendance: 17,445
- Referee: Jerome Boger
- TV announcers (CBS): Greg Gumbel, Rich Gannon and Jay Feely
- Recap, Game Book

Game information

**First quarter**

- JAX – Aldrick Rosas 26-yard field goal, 8:14. Jaguars 3–0. **Drive: 12 plays, 71 yards, 6:46.**
- CHI – Jimmy Graham 5-yard pass from Mitchell Trubisky (Cairo Santos kick), 3:18. Bears 7–3. **Drive: 10 plays, 75 yards, 4:56.**

**Second quarter**

- CHI – Cairo Santos 20-yard field goal, 13:17. Bears 10–3. **Drive: 8 plays, 63 yards, 3:12.**
- JAX – D. J. Chark 20-yard pass from Mike Glennon (Aldrick Rosas kick), 8:21. Tied 10–10. **Drive: 10 plays, 70 yards, 4:56.**
- CHI – Cairo Santos 40-yard field goal, 0:00. Bears 13–10. **Drive: 2 plays, 10 yards, 0:08.**

**Third quarter**

- CHI – Mitchell Trubisky 6-yard run (Cairo Santos kick), 9;14. Bears 20–10. **Drive: 11 plays, 77 yards, 5:46.**
- CHI – David Montgomery 6-yard run (Cairo Santos kick), 3:17. Bears 27–10. **Drive: 8 plays, 54 yards, 4:01.**
- CHI – Jimmy Graham 22-yard pass from Mitchell Trubisky (Cairo Santos kick), 2:30. Bears 34–10. **Drive: 2 plays, 25 yards, 0:33.**

**Fourth quarter**

- CHI – Artavis Pierce 3-yard run (Cairo Santos kick), 11:47. Bears 41–10. **Drive: 9 plays, 48 yards, 4:08.**
- JAX – Laviska Shenault 34-yard pass from Mike Glennon (Aldrick Rosas kick), 4:29. Bears 41–17. **Drive: 6 plays, 64 yards, 2:12.**

**Top passers**

- CHI – Mitchell Trubisky – 24/35, 265 yards, 2 TD, INT
- JAX – Mike Glennon – 24/37, 211 yards, 2 TD, 2 INT

**Top rushers**

- CHI – David Montgomery – 23 rushes, 95 yards, TD
- JAX – Dare Ogunbowale – 14 rushes, 71 yards

**Top receivers**

- CHI – Allen Robinson – 10 receptions, 103 yards
- JAX – Laviska Shenault – 5 receptions, 48 yards, TD

The Bears' last road game of the season saw them play the 1–13 Jacksonville Jaguars, which served as a return game for ex-Jaguars Foles, Tashaun Gipson, Robinson, and John DeFilippo; conversely, Jaguars starting quarterback Mike Glennon took on the team for whom he had started four games in 2017. In seven all-time meetings between the Bears and Jaguars, the former held a 4–3 advantage and was 2–1 in away games, most recently winning 41–3 in 2012. Jacksonville won their latest game 17–16 in Chicago in 2016. Transactions during the week included recalling Carter and Ives from reserve/COVID-19, signing running back Spencer Ware—who played under Nagy with the Chiefs—and former Lions cornerback Teez Tabor to the practice squad, releasing Clark, and placing Reggie Davis on practice squad reserve/injured. With Johnson and Skrine still out, Crawford was activated for the second straight week. Demetrius Harris (foot injury), McCullers, Ridley, and Simmons were also inactive.

Both teams scored on their opening driver as Aldrick Rosas kicked a 26-yard field goal for Jacksonville and Trubisky threw a five-yard touchdown pass to Graham for Chicago. After the Jaguars punted, the Bears reached the opposing one-yard line but failed to score a touchdown, forcing them to settle for Santos' second-quarter 20-yard field goal. Jacksonville responded with a 70-yard drive that ended on Glennon's 20-yard touchdown throw to D. J. Chark to tie the game. With 24 seconds remaining in the first half, the Bears reached the Jaguars' 13 but Trubisky was intercepted by Joe Schobert, though Glennon also threw an interception to Smith that led to Santos' 40-yard kick to give the Bears the 13–10 halftime lead. Chicago opened the third quarter with a 77-yard series that culminated in Trubisky's six-yard touchdown run, which was followed by three more unanswered touchdowns on Montgomery's six-yard run, Trubisky's 22-yard throw to Graham (after Glennon was intercepted by Smith again), and Pierce's three-yard run. Pierce's score, the first of his NFL career, was preceded by his 23-yard run on a Wildcat formation play with Montgomery receiving the snap. The two teams traded punts before Glennon threw a 34-yard touchdown to Laviska Shenault. With the game having entered garbage time, Foles substituted for Trubisky to close out the 41–17 win.

With the win and the Cardinals losing to the San Francisco 49ers, the Bears moved into the seventh seed. The game was Chicago's first 40-point game since their win over Buffalo in 2018 and extended their streak of 30-point performances to three, the longest since 1965. Individual feats accomplished during the win included Robinson eclipsing 100 receptions in a season for the first time in his career, Montgomery becoming the Bears' first 1,000-yard rusher since Howard in 2017, Smith being the first Bears linebacker to record multiple interceptions in a game since Lance Briggs in 2008 and the first Bears defender since Ha Ha Clinton-Dix in 2019, and Santos tying Robbie Gould's team record for the most consecutive field goals made in a season at 24. The Robinson–Montgomery duo also marked the team's first season with a rusher and receiver breaking 1,000 yards in their respective categories since Matt Forte and Alshon Jeffery in 2014.

==== Week 17: vs. Green Bay Packers ====
Week Seventeen: Green Bay Packers at Chicago Bears – Game summary

Quarter	1	2	3	4	Total
**Packers**	0	21	0	14	**35**
Bears	7	6	3	0	**16**

at Soldier Field, Chicago, Illinois

- Date: January 3, 2021
- Game time: 3:25 p.m. CST
- Game weather: Cloudy, 32 °F (0 °C)
- Game attendance: 0
- Referee: Craig Wrolstad
- TV announcers (Fox): Kevin Burkhardt, Daryl Johnston and Pam Oliver
- Recap, Game Book

Game information

**First quarter**

- CHI – David Montgomery 2-yard run (Cairo Santos kick), 7:31. Bears 7–0. **Drive: 14 plays, 60 plays, 7:29.**

**Second quarter**

- GB – Robert Tonyan 3-yard pass from Aaron Rodgers (Mason Crosby kick), 14:55. Tied 7–7. **Drive: 12 plays, 80 yards, 7:36.**
- CHI – Cairo Santos 30-yard field goal, 10:08. Bears 10–7. **Drive: 4 plays, 8 yards, 2:12.**
- GB – Marquez Valdes-Scantling 72-yard pass from Aaron Rodgers (Mason Crosby kick), 8:31. Packers 14–10. **Bears: 3 plays, 78 yards, 1:37.**
- GB – Dominique Dafney 13-yard pass from Aaron Rodgers (Mason Crosby kick), 3:57. Packers 21–10. **Drive: 6 plays, 22 yards, 3:39.**
- CHI – Cairo Santos 27-yard field goal, 0:03. Packers 21–13. **Drive: 13 plays, 62 yards, 3:54.**

**Third quarter**

- CHI – Cairo Santos 20-yard field goal, 5:30. Packers 21–16. **Drive: 11 plays, 87 yards, 6:50.**

**Fourth quarter**

- GB – Aaron Jones 4-yard run (Mason Crosby kick), 3:47. Packers 28–16. **Drive: 12 plays, 76 yards, 7:35.**
- GB – Davante Adams 6-yard pass from Aaron Rodgers (Mason Crosby kick), 2:56. Packers 35–16. **Drive: 3 plays, 26 yards, 0:17.**

**Top passers**

- GB – Aaron Rodgers – 19/24, 240 yards, 4 TD
- CHI – Mitchell Trubisky – 33/42, 252 yards, INT

**Top rushers**

- GB – Aaron Jones – 11 rushes, 42 yards, TD
- CHI – David Montgomery – 22 rushes, 69 yards

**Top receivers**

- GB – Davante Adams – 6 receptions, 46 yards, TD
- CHI – Darnell Mooney – 11 receptions, 93 yards

The season finale came against the Packers, who had won all but two meetings at Soldier Field during the 2010s. In the wild card race, a Cardinals loss to the Rams would have guaranteed the Bears a playoff spot regardless of the result against the Packers. Crawford received another active roster elevation as Johnson and Skrine continued to nurse their injuries; both cornerbacks, McCullers, Ridley, and Simmons were also inactive.

The Packers' opening kickoff saw Patterson touch the ball at the one-yard line as he slid out of bounds, resulting in an illegal kick penalty that began the Bears' drive on their 40-yard line. The series lasted 14 plays and 70 yards; although Montgomery suffered an injury on the drive, he returned in time to score on a two-yard run. The Packers responded with an 80-yard drive that concluded with Rodgers' three-yard touchdown to Tonyan. The Bears punted on the ensuing possession, but Demetrius Harris forced Green Bay returner Tavon Austin to fumble and Houston-Carson recovered at the Packers' 20, leading to Santos' 30-yard field goal. Green Bay followed with 14 unanswered points on Rodgers' 72- and 13-yard touchdown throws to Marquez Valdes-Scantling and Dominique Dafney, which sandwiched a Kmet fumble at the Bears' 25. Santos kicked a 27-yard field goal to reduce the deficit to eight points entering halftime. The Packers nearly scored again to begin the second half when Valdes-Scantling dropped a touchdown pass, but eventually punted for the first time. Chicago, aided by a 53-yard pass from Trubisky to Mooney, added another field goal from Santos of 20 yards that set the Bears record for the most consecutive field goals made at 27. After the Packers punted again, the Bears' next offensive series saw them convert two fourth-and-one situations before Mooney got hurt and a third attempt to make a fourth-and-one at the Packers' 25 resulted in a turnover on downs. Green Bay scored again on a four-yard touchdown run by Aaron Jones, followed by Trubisky being intercepted by Adrian Amos to set up Rodgers' six-yard touchdown to Adams. Down 35–16, the Bears reached the Packers' four-yard line but failed to score as their regular season ended with an 8–8 record.

Despite the loss, the Bears clinched the NFC's third and final wild card slot as the Cardinals lost 18–7 to the Rams. It marked the Bears' second playoff appearance in Nagy's three-year tenure as head coach. The 2020 team was the franchise's first to qualify for the playoffs via wild card since 1994, which also saw them reach the postseason by claiming the third and last remaining slot in the conference; the 2020 and 1994 Bears also lost their regular season finales (both at home; both teams' offenses also scored on their opening drives before faltering) but entered the playoffs with help from other clubs. This would the Bears last playoff berth until 2025. Nagy noted in his post-game conference that it was "okay to feel like crap right now. We put a lot of time and effort and energy into winning this football game and it sucks when you lose. [...] But no one is going to take away from what these players did to work back these last three weeks to put ourselves in a position to make the playoffs."

The Bears, who saw an uptick in offensive production after the bye week, ended the regular season with the 22nd-ranked scoring offense at 23.3 points per game, 25th in rushing, and 22nd in passing. Inversely, the defense struggled since the bye, and ranked 14th in scoring defense at 23.1 points allowed per game.

=== Standings ===
==== Division ====
NFC North
	W	L	T	PCT	DIV	CONF	PF	PA	STK
^{(1)} Green Bay Packers	13	3	0	.813	5–1	10–2	509	369	W6
^{(7)} Chicago Bears	8	8	0	.500	2–4	6–6	372	370	L1
Minnesota Vikings	7	9	0	.438	4–2	5–7	430	475	W1
Detroit Lions	5	11	0	.313	1–5	4–8	377	519	L4

==== Conference ====
NFC
#	Team	Division	W	L	T	PCT	DIV	CONF	SOS	SOV	STK
**Division leaders**
1	Green Bay Packers	North	13	3	0	.813	5–1	10–2	.428	.387	W6
2 (Note: New Orleans finished ahead of Seattle based on conference record.)	New Orleans Saints	South	12	4	0	.750	6–0	10–2	.459	.406	W2
3	Seattle Seahawks	West	12	4	0	.750	4–2	9–3	.447	.404	W4
4	Washington Football Team	East	7	9	0	.438	4–2	5–7	.459	.388	W1
**Wild cards**
5	Tampa Bay Buccaneers	South	11	5	0	.688	4–2	8–4	.488	.392	W4
6	Los Angeles Rams	West	10	6	0	.625	3–3	9–3	.494	.484	W1
7 (Note: Chicago finished and clinched the 7th and final playoff spot ahead of Arizona based on better win percentage in common games (against Detroit, the NY Giants, Carolina, and the LA Rams, Chicago finished 3–2, while Arizona finished 1–4).)	Chicago Bears	North	8	8	0	.500	2–4	6–6	.488	.336	L1
**Did not qualify for the postseason**
8	Arizona Cardinals	West	8	8	0	.500	2–4	6–6	.475	.441	L2
9	Minnesota Vikings	North	7	9	0	.438	4–2	5–7	.504	.366	W1
10 (Note: San Francisco finished ahead of the NY Giants based on head-to-head victory. Division tie break was initially used to eliminate Dallas (see below).)	San Francisco 49ers	West	6	10	0	.375	3–3	4–8	.549	.448	L1
11 (Note: NY Giants won tiebreaker over Dallas based on division record.)	New York Giants	East	6	10	0	.375	4–2	5–7	.502	.427	W1
12	Dallas Cowboys	East	6	10	0	.375	2–4	5–7	.471	.333	L1
13 (Note: Carolina finished ahead of Detroit based on head-to-head victory.)	Carolina Panthers	South	5	11	0	.313	1–5	4–8	.531	.388	L1
14	Detroit Lions	North	5	11	0	.313	1–5	4–8	.508	.350	L4
15	Philadelphia Eagles	East	4	11	1	.281	2–4	4–8	.537	.469	L3
16	Atlanta Falcons	South	4	12	0	.250	1–5	2–10	.551	.391	L5
**Tiebreakers** (Note: When breaking ties for three or more teams under the NFL's rules, they are first broken within divisions, then comparing only the highest-ranked remaining team from each division.)

== Postseason ==
=== Schedule ===
Round	Date	Opponent (seed)	Result	Record	Venue	Recap
Wild Card	January 10, 2021	at New Orleans Saints (2)	L 9–21	0–1	Mercedes-Benz Superdome	Recap

=== Game summaries ===
==== NFC Wild Card Playoffs: at (2) New Orleans Saints ====
NFC Wild Card Playoffs: (7) Chicago Bears at (2) New Orleans Saints – Game summary

Quarter	1	2	3	4	Total
Bears	0	3	0	6	9
Saints	7	0	7	7	21

at Mercedes-Benz Superdome, New Orleans, Louisiana

- Date: January 10, 2021
- Game time: 3:40 p.m. CST
- Game weather: None (indoor stadium)
- Game attendance: 3,017
- Referee: Alex Kemp
- TV announcers (CBS/Nickelodeon): Jim Nantz, Tony Romo, Tracy Wolfson and Jay Feely; Noah Eagle, Nate Burleson, Gabrielle Nevaeh Green and Lex Lumpkin (Nickelodeon feed)
- Recap, Game Book

Game information

First quarter

- NO – Michael Thomas 11-yard pass from Drew Brees (Wil Lutz kick), 5:09. Saints 7–0. Drive: 8 plays, 55 yards, 4:17.

Second quarter

- CHI – Cairo Santos 36-yard field goal, 8:06. Saints 7–3. Drive: 6 plays, 6 yards, 3:24.

Third quarter

- NO – Latavius Murray 6-yard pass from Drew Brees (Wil Lutz kick), 4:08. Saints 14–3. Drive: 12 plays, 85 yards, 7:29.

Fourth quarter

- NO – Alvin Kamara 3-yard run (Wil Lutz kick), 8:50. Saints 21–3. Drive: 15 plays, 64 yards, 8:51.
- CHI – Jimmy Graham 19-yard pass from Mitchell Trubisky, 0:00. Saints 21–9. Drive: 11 plays, 99 yards, 2:19.

Top passers

- CHI – Mitchell Trubisky – 19/29, 199 yards, TD
- NO – Drew Brees – 28/39, 265 yards, 2 TD

Top rushers

- CHI – David Montgomery – 12 rushes, 31 yards
- NO – Alvin Kamara – 23 rushes, 99 yards, TD

Top receivers

- CHI – Allen Robinson – 6 receptions, 55 yards
- NO – Deonte Harris – 7 receptions, 83 yards

The Bears entered the postseason as the seventh seed against the second-seeded, NFC South champion Saints. While the Bears were 2–0 in playoff games against the Saints (most recently a 39–14 win in the 2006 season's NFC Championship Game), they had not won in New Orleans since 2005. The matchup also provided further similarities between the 2020 Bears and their 1994 counterpart as both were underdogs playing their wild card games in a domed stadium, with the 1994 team taking on the division champion Vikings; both Bears teams also entered their games hoping to break six-game losing streaks to their respective opponents, with the older iteration ultimately succeeding 35–18. Mooney (ankle) and Smith (elbow) missed the game with injuries that they suffered against the Packers, leading to Te'o and Christian being activated from the practice squad. McCullers, Johnson, Simmons, Skrine, and Trevis Gipson also did not play. The match was also the first NFL game to be aired on Nickelodeon as part of a partnership between the league and ViacomCBS to produce children-oriented programming; the broadcast featured simplified graphics, different commentary from the CBS broadcast, and the digital addition of Nickelodeon's green slime for touchdowns.

Both teams punted to start the game, which was followed by Brees' 11-yard touchdown pass to Michael Thomas for the first touchdown. The Bears attempted to respond on a trick play in which Montgomery took the snap from the Wildcat formation and handed off to Patterson, who pitched to Trubisky; Trubisky threw to Wims, who dropped the potential score in the end zone. The Saints' ensuing drive saw Shelley intercept Brees' pass before it was overturned, though Lutz missed a 50-yard field goal. After the Bears punted again, Taysom Hill was hit by Tashaun Gipson as he threw the ball, which Jenkins caught. Although Chicago reached the nine-yard line on the following series, Kmet received a controversial unsportsmanlike conduct penalty when he tossed the ball over Saints safety Malcolm Jenkins to field judge Nathan Jones, which was regarded by the official as taunting and pushed the offense back; Santos subsequently made a 36-yard field goal. The first half's remaining drives ended with punts. Following another Bears punt to begin the second half, the Saints drove 85 yards—aided by a fourth-down neutral zone infraction penalty on Jackson—and score on Latavius Murray's six-yard touchdown pass. Further defensive penalties hindered the Bears on the Saints' next possession when Kindle Vildor's holding nullified a 14-yard sack by Mack and Trevathan's pass interference set up New Orleans at Chicago's one-yard line, where Alvin Kamara scored on a run. The Bears punted again and the Saints reached their one for the second consecutive drive, though Brees' quarterback sneak on fourth down was short. Down 21–3, Chicago drove 99 yards and Trubisky threw a 19-yard touchdown pass to Graham on the final play of the game.

The defeat ended the Bears' season with an overall record of 8–9. In a post-game article, team writer Nathan Smith wrote the organization faced "several questions" about the season, including the six-game losing streak, the defense's struggles as the offense improved, and their 1–7 record against playoff teams. Nagy also noted in his press conference that the team needed to "really start figuring out, 'Okay, where are we? How do we get better?' We know this isn't good enough. What we need to do is do everything we can to be able to win a Super Bowl. That's the goal. The goal is not to make the playoffs." This would the Bears last playoff game until 2025.

== Awards ==
During the season, Santos received weekly and monthly awards for his performance. In Week 6 against the Panthers, he was named NFC Special Teams Player of the Week after making all three of his field goal attempts. Santos would also receive NFC Special Teams Player of the Month for December when he converted 12 field goals without a miss. December also saw Trubisky be nominated for the FedEx Air Player of the Week for his Week 14 showing against the Texans.

Although the 2021 Pro Bowl was canceled due to the pandemic, Mack and Patterson were voted to the all-star game; it was Mack's sixth straight Pro Bowl and third as a Bear, while Patterson had also been voted into the 2020 game's roster in his first season in Chicago. The two were also named first-team All-Pro, while Smith was on the second team; Mack received the third-most votes among edge rushers with six, while Patterson had 43 votes as a kick returner and one as a special teamer. Smith made the All-Pro Team with ten votes in a tie with the Buccaneers' Lavonte David.

In the postseason game against New Orleans, Trubisky pulled off a sensational performance despite the Bears' loss. As a result, the fans awarded him with the highly coveted Nickelodeon Valuable Player (NVP) award. At the time, Trubisky was the only player in NFL history to ever receive the award.
