= J. P. Holtz =

American football player (born 1993)

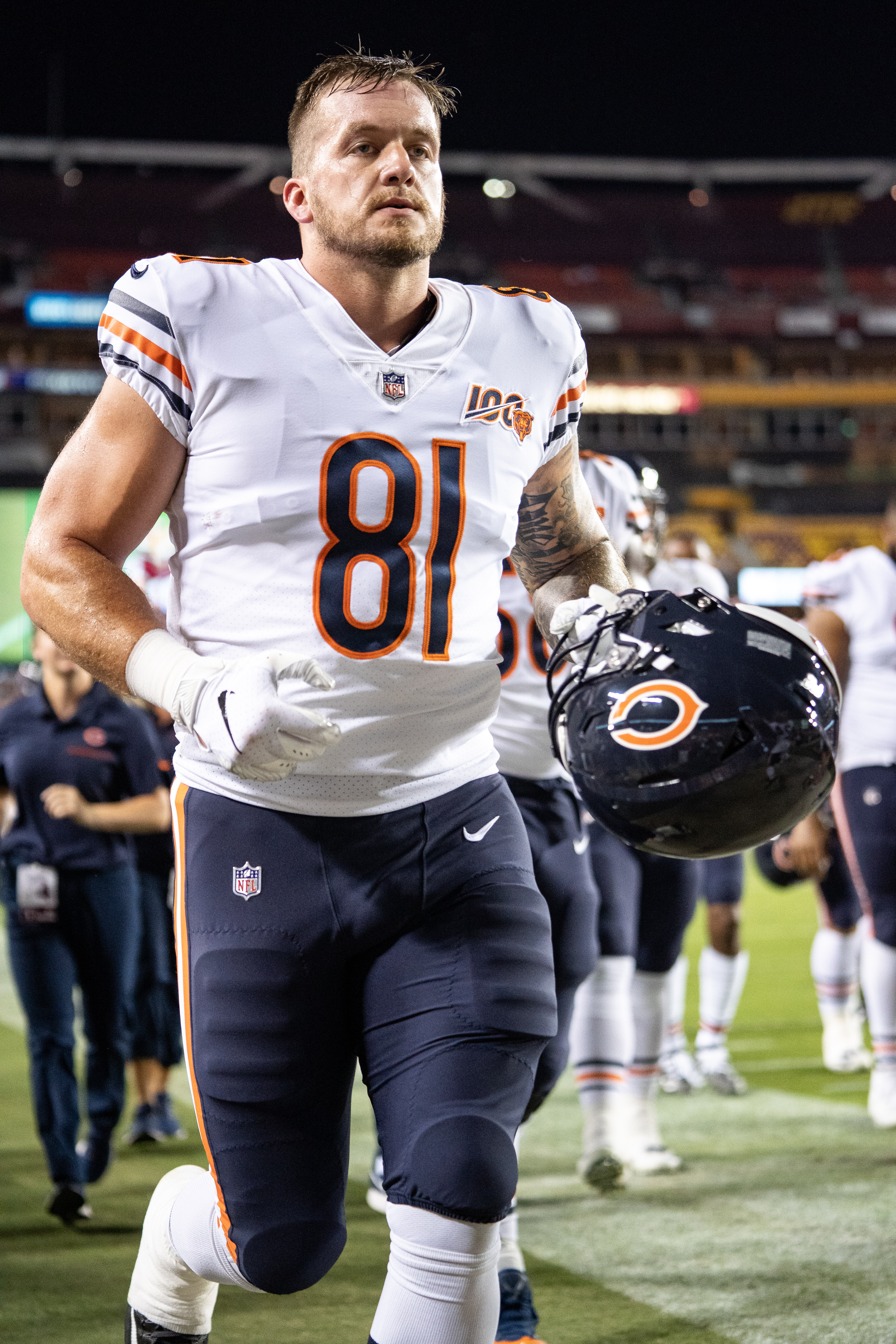
- Holtz with the Chicago Bears in 2019

Profile
- Position: Tight end

Personal information
- Born: August 28, 1993 (age 33); Pittsburgh, Pennsylvania, U.S.
- Listed height: 6 ft 3 in (1.91 m)
- Listed weight: 255 lb (116 kg)

Career information
- High school: Pittsburgh (PA) Shaler Area
- College: Pittsburgh (2012–2015)
- NFL draft: 2016: undrafted

Career history
- Cleveland Browns (2016–2017)*; Washington Redskins (2018–2019); Chicago Bears (2019–2021); New Orleans Saints (2022–2023)
- * Offseason or practice squad member only

Career NFL statistics
- Receptions: 7
- Receiving yards: 91
- Stats at Pro Football Reference

John Paul Holtz (born August 28, 1993) was an American professional football tight end. He played college football at Pittsburgh. He was signed by the Cleveland Browns as an undrafted free agent in 2016 and has also been a member the Washington Redskins, Chicago Bears, and New Orleans Saints.

== Early life ==
John Paul “J.P.” Holtz grew up in Pittsburgh, Pennsylvania, attending Shaler Area High School, where he was a four-year varsity letterman in football and basketball. After playing quarterback as a freshman, Holtz later played running back, wide receiver, tight end, linebacker, and punter throughout his high school career, while playing center in basketball. A 3-star tight end recruit, Holtz committed to Pittsburgh to play college football over offers from Arkansas, Boston College, Michigan, Michigan State, Penn State, Purdue, and West Virginia, among others.

== College career ==
In his four-year career playing tight end for Pitt, Holtz played in 53 games with 48 starts from 2012-2015. He finished his college career with 81 catches for 931 yards and 11 touchdowns. As a senior, Holtz was named team captain, playing in all 13 games with 12 starts, recording 24 receptions for 350 yards and four touchdowns. After the season, Holtz was selected to play in the 2016 NFLPA Collegiate Bowl all-star game.

== Professional career ==
Pre-draft measurables
Height	Weight	Arm length	Hand span	40-yard dash	10-yard split	20-yard split	20-yard shuttle	Three-cone drill	Vertical jump	Broad jump	Bench press
6 ft 3 in (1.91 m)	238 lb (108 kg)	33 1/2 in (0.85 m)	9 7/8 in (0.25 m)	4.79 s	1.66 s	2.82 s	4.33 s	6.92 s	33.0 in (0.84 m)	9 ft 4 in (2.84 m)	20 reps
All values from Pro Day

=== Cleveland Browns ===
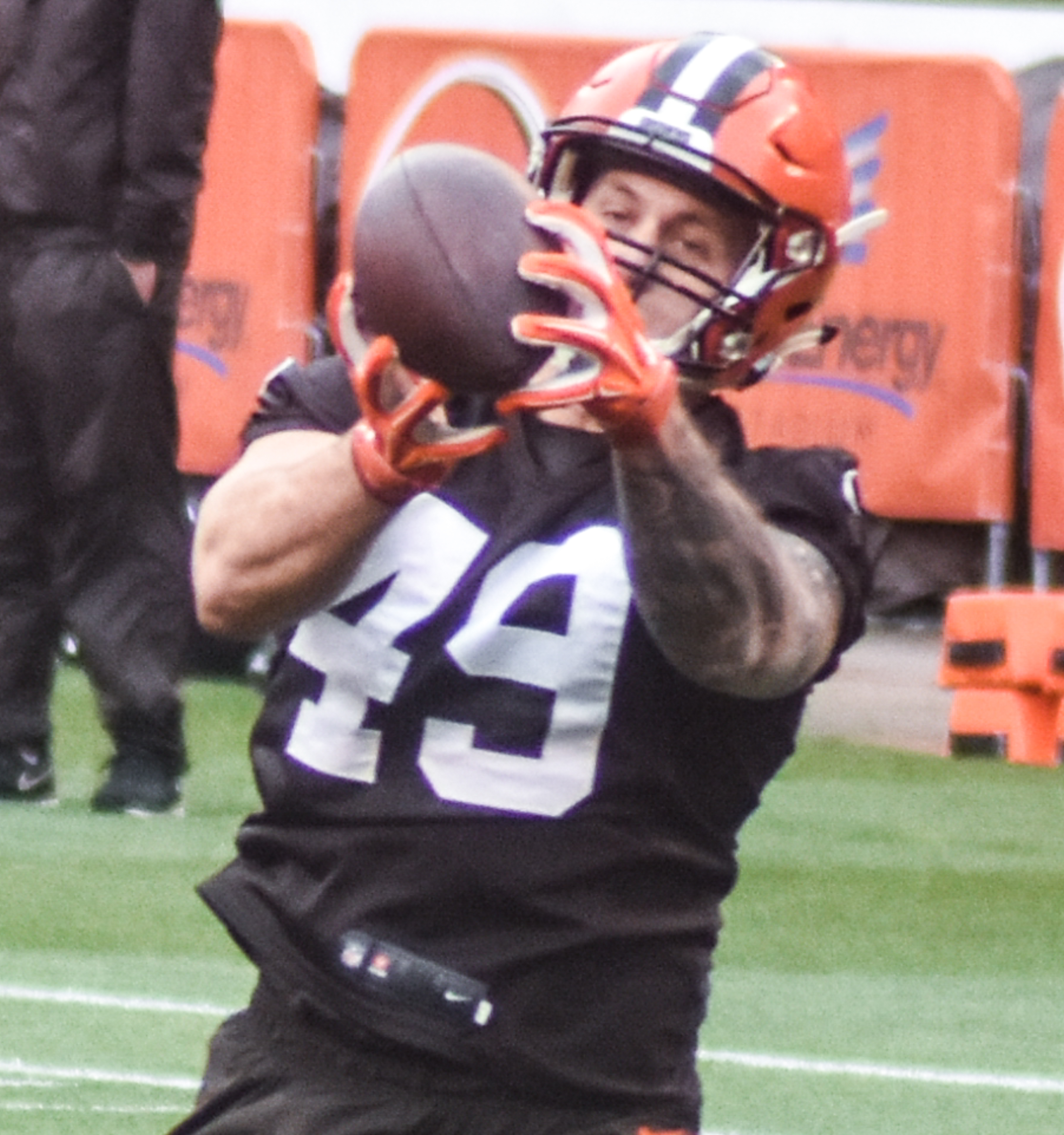
Holtz with the Browns in 2016

Holtz was signed by the Cleveland Browns as an undrafted free agent on May 5, 2016. He was waived by the Browns on September 3, 2016. On December 20, 2016, he was signed to the Browns' practice squad. The Browns signed Holtz to a reserve/future contract on January 2, 2017.

On September 2, 2017, Holtz was waived by the Browns and was signed to the practice squad the next day. He was released on October 10, 2017.

=== Washington Redskins ===
Holtz signed with the Washington Redskins on August 11, 2018. On September 1, 2018, he was waived for final roster cuts before the start of the 2018 season, and signed with the team's practice squad four days later. He was promoted to the active roster on December 29, 2018.

Holtz was waived on August 31, 2019, but was signed to the practice squad the following day. He was promoted to the active roster on September 7, 2019. In his NFL debut against the Philadelphia Eagles, he played exclusively on special teams. He was waived on September 10, 2019.

=== Chicago Bears ===
On September 11, 2019, Holtz was claimed off waivers by the Chicago Bears. During the 2019 season, in addition to playing tight end, he spent time at fullback when the Bears ran rushing plays out of the I formation. In a Week 14 win over the Dallas Cowboys, Holtz led the Bears in receiving yards as he caught three passes for 56 yards; during the second quarter, he caught a screen pass and gained 30 yards to set up a field goal. He ended the year with seven starts in 14 games as he caught seven passes for 91 yards.

Holtz became an exclusive-rights free agent after the 2019 season. He re-signed with the Bears on April 17, 2020. Due to the 2020 coronavirus pandemic, the NFL canceled all preseason activities, and depth charts had to be ordered with no performance information on players. Holtz made the 53-man roster as the fourth tight end in the depth, below Jimmy Graham, Cole Kmet, and Demetrius Harris. Holtz mainly served as an up-man for the kick returner (Cordarrelle Patterson). This led to his first 2020 kick return in Week 9, a 24–17 loss to the Tennessee Titans. He returned it for seven yards. Holtz played in the next three games, all losses, to the Minnesota Vikings, the Green Bay Packers, Detroit Lions, during which he returned three kicks. On his second kick in the Week 13 34–30 loss to the Lions, Holtz walked off the field with an apparent shoulder injury.

Holtz signed a contract extension with the team on March 3, 2021.

=== New Orleans Saints ===
On April 5, 2022, Holtz signed with the New Orleans Saints. He was waived on August 30, 2022, and signed to the practice squad the next day. He was elevated to the active roster on October 1, 2022, via a standard elevation which caused him to revert back to the practice squad after the game. He was signed to the active roster on October 5. He was released on November 19 and re-signed to the practice squad.

On August 9, 2023, Holtz re-signed with the Saints. He was released on August 29. He was re-signed to the practice squad on October 11. He was released on October 23.

=== NFL career statistics ===
Year	Team	GP	Rec	Tgts	Yards	Avg	Lng	TD
2019	WAS	1	0	0	0	0	0	0
2019	CHI	14	7	8	91	13	30	0
2020	CHI	16	0	1	0	0	0	0
2021	CHI	13	0	0	0	0	0	0
2022	NO	6	2	0	0	0	0	0
2023	NO	1	0	0	0	0	0	0
Career		51	10	9	91	2.1	30	0
