= Arlington Hambright =

American football player (born 1996)

No. 71, 64
- Position: Guard

Personal information
- Born: January 30, 1996 (age 30); Ypsilanti, Michigan, U.S.
- Listed height: 6 ft 5 in (1.96 m)
- Listed weight: 300 lb (136 kg)

Career information
- High school: Belleville (Belleville, Michigan)
- College: Garden City (2015–2016); Oklahoma State (2017–2018); Colorado (2019)
- NFL draft: 2020: 7th round, 226th overall pick

Career history
- Chicago Bears (2020–2021); New England Patriots (2022)*; Indianapolis Colts (2022–2023); Houston Texans (2024)*; Tennessee Titans (2024); Montreal Alouettes (2026)*
- * Offseason or practice squad member only

Career NFL statistics
- Games played: 15
- Games started: 1
- Stats at Pro Football Reference

Arlington Hambright (born January 30, 1996) is an American former professional football player who was a guard in the National Football League (NFL). He played college football for the Colorado Buffaloes. He was a member of the Chicago Bears, New England Patriots, Indianapolis Colts, Houston Texans, Tennessee Titans, and Montreal Alouettes.

== College career ==
After graduating Belleville as a no-star recruit, Hambright played his first two years of college football at Garden City Community College. He then transferred to Oklahoma State, where he redshirted a year and had a year cut short due to injury. Hambright played his final season of college at Colorado.

== Professional career ==
Pre-draft measurables
Height	Weight	Arm length	Hand span	40-yard dash	10-yard split	20-yard split	Vertical jump	Broad jump	Bench press
6 ft 3 7/8 in (1.93 m)	307 lb (139 kg)	32 5/8 in (0.83 m)	9 3/8 in (0.24 m)	4.97 s	1.77 s	2.85 s	28.5 in (0.72 m)	9 ft 1 in (2.77 m)	29 reps
All values from Pro Day

=== Chicago Bears ===
Hambright was selected by the Chicago Bears in the seventh round (226th overall) of the 2020 NFL draft, previously acquired from the Las Vegas Raiders as part of the blockbuster Khalil Mack trade that sent two first round picks (Josh Jacobs and Damon Arnette) to the Raiders. He signed a four-year rookie contract with the team on July 21. Hambright made his NFL debut on special teams against the New Orleans Saints in Week 8, and made his first NFL start the following week against the Tennessee Titans. He appeared in nine games during the 2020 season.

On August 31, 2021, Hambright was waived by the Bears and re-signed to the practice squad the next day.

=== New England Patriots ===
On January 18, 2022, Hambright signed a reserve/future contract with the New England Patriots. He was waived on August 30.

=== Indianapolis Colts ===
On September 1, 2022, Hambright was signed to the Indianapolis Colts' practice squad. He signed a reserve/future contract on January 9, 2023.

On August 31, 2023, Hambright was waived by the Colts and re-signed to the practice squad. He was promoted to the active roster on September 19. Hambright was released on December 14 and re-signed to the practice squad. On January 8, 2024, he signed a reserve/future contract.

Hambright was waived by the Colts on August 27. He played in two games with the Colts during the 2023 season.

=== Houston Texans ===
On September 9, 2024, Hambright signed with the Houston Texans' practice squad. He was released on October 22.

=== Tennessee Titans ===
On October 29, 2024, Hambright was signed to the Tennessee Titans' practice squad. He was promoted to the active roster on December 28. Hambright played four games on special teams during the 2024 season.

On April 29, 2025, Hambright was waived by the Titans. He was re-signed on August 3, and released on August 25 as part of final roster cuts.

=== Montreal Alouettes ===
On February 19, 2026, Hambright signed with the Montreal Alouettes of the Canadian Football League (CFL).

On April 9, 2026 Hambright announced his retirement from professional football.
