= Devante Bond =

American football player (born 1993)

No. 59, 53
- Position: Linebacker

Personal information
- Born: July 3, 1993 (age 33); Sacramento, California, U.S.
- Listed height: 6 ft 1 in (1.85 m)
- Listed weight: 236 lb (107 kg)

Career information
- High school: [[ McClellan High School (Antelope, California) Foothill (Sacramento)
- College: Sierra College football Rocklin CA Oklahoma
- NFL draft: 2016: 6th round, 183rd overall pick

Career history
- Tampa Bay Buccaneers (2016–2019); Chicago Bears (2019–2020); Dallas Cowboys (2021–2022)

Career NFL statistics
- Total tackles: 39
- Stats at Pro Football Reference

Devante Bond (born July 3, 1993) is an American former professional football player who was a linebacker in the National Football League (NFL). He was selected by the Tampa Bay Buccaneers in the sixth round of the 2016 NFL draft, and also played in the NFL for the Chicago Bears. He played college football for the Oklahoma Sooners.

== Professional career ==
Pre-draft measurables
| Height | Weight | Arm length | Hand span | 40-yard dash | 20-yard shuttle | Three-cone drill | Vertical jump | Broad jump | Bench press |
|---|---|---|---|---|---|---|---|---|---|
| 6 ft 1 1/8 in (1.86 m) | 235 lb (107 kg) | 32 3/8 in (0.82 m) | 9 1/4 in (0.23 m) | 4.70 s | 4.36 s | 7.07 s | 37.5 in (0.95 m) | 10 ft 1 in (3.07 m) | 21 reps |
All values from NFL Combine

=== Tampa Bay Buccaneers ===
Bond was selected by the Tampa Bay Buccaneers in the sixth round, 183rd overall, in the 2016 NFL draft. On September 23, 2016, he was placed on injured reserve with a hamstring injury.

On September 24, 2017, he made his NFL debut in a Week 3 game against Minnesota Vikings. On October 5, 2017, he recorded his first career tackle in a game against the New England Patriots.

On September 1, 2018, Bond was placed on injured reserve. On September 11, 2018, Bond was waived from the Buccaneers with an injury settlement. On October 17, 2018, Bond was re-signed by the Buccaneers.

On March 5, 2019, Bond re-signed with the Buccaneers. On October 15, 2019, Bond was released by the Buccaneers. He was suspended four weeks by the NFL for violating the league's performance-enhancing drugs policy on October 18, 2019. He was reinstated from suspension on November 12, 2019.

=== Chicago Bears ===
On December 9, 2019, Bond was signed by the Chicago Bears.

On February 22, 2020, Bond re-signed with the Bears. He was released on July 26. He was re-signed to their practice squad on September 18. He was elevated to the active roster the next day for the team's week 2 game against the New York Giants, and reverted to the practice squad after the game. He was elevated again on October 8 for the team's week 5 game against the Tampa Bay Buccaneers, and reverted to the practice squad again following the game. He was placed on the practice squad/injured list on October 9, and restored to the practice squad on December 9. His practice squad contract with the team expired after the season on January 18, 2021.

=== Dallas Cowboys ===
On December 30, 2021, Bond was signed to the Dallas Cowboys practice squad. He signed a reserve/future contract with the Cowboys on January 18, 2022. He was placed on injured reserve on July 8, 2022, after suffering a season-ending knee injury in organized team activities. He was waived on April 24, 2023, with a failed physical designation.
