= Artavis Pierce =

American football player (born 1996)

Profile
- Position: Running back

Personal information
- Born: May 17, 1996 (age 30); Lake Alfred, Florida, U.S.
- Listed height: 5 ft 11 in (1.80 m)
- Listed weight: 208 lb (94 kg)

Career information
- High school: Auburndale (Auburndale, Florida)
- College: Oregon State
- NFL draft: 2020: undrafted

Career history
- Chicago Bears (2020–2021); Cleveland Browns (2021)*; DC Defenders (2023); Edmonton Elks (2025)*
- * Offseason or practice squad member only

Career NFL statistics
- Rushing yards: 34
- Rushing average: 5.7
- Rushing touchdowns: 1
- Stats at Pro Football Reference

Artavis Pierce (born May 17, 1996) is an American professional football running back. He played college football at Oregon State.

== Professional career ==
=== Chicago Bears ===
Pierce signed with the Chicago Bears as an undrafted free agent following the 2020 NFL draft on April 28, 2020. He was placed on the reserve/COVID-19 list by the team on July 27, 2020, and activated six days later. He was waived on September 5, as part of final roster cuts, and re-signed to the practice squad the next day.

The Bears promoted Pierce to the active roster on September 29. He made his NFL debut in Week 6 against the Carolina Panthers as a special teams player, while his first carries came four weeks later against the Minnesota Vikings, during which he rushed three times for nine yards. Pierce's first touchdown was in Week 16, a victory over the Jacksonville Jaguars, with a three-yard rushing score that had been set up by a 23-yard run out of the Wildcat formation on the previous play.

On August 31, 2021, Pierce was waived by the Bears and re-signed to the practice squad the next day. However he was subsequently released on September 8, 2021. On October 5, 2021, Pierce was re-signed to the practice squad following injuries to multiple running backs on the active roster. He was waived from the practice squad on December 28, 2021.

=== Cleveland Browns ===
On January 5, 2022, Pierce was signed to the Cleveland Browns' practice squad.

=== DC Defenders ===
On November 17, 2022, Pierce was drafted by the DC Defenders of the XFL. He was placed on the reserve list by the team on March 14, 2023, and activated on May 16. He was not part of the roster after the 2024 UFL dispersal draft on January 15, 2024.

=== Edmonton Elks ===
Pierce signed with the Edmonton Elks on March 21, 2025. He was released on June 1, 2025.
