= Dieter Eiselen =

South African-born American football player (born 1996)

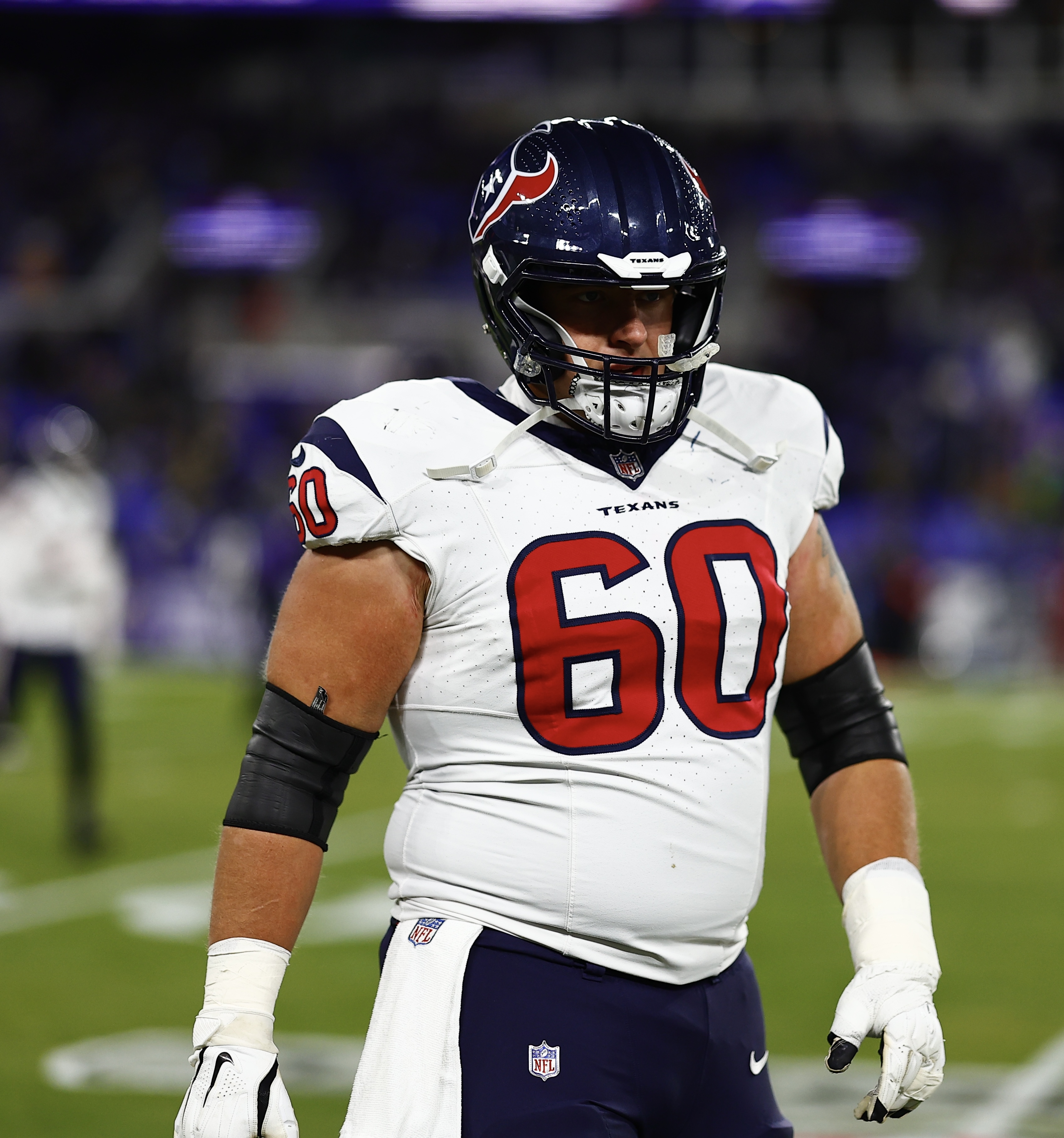
- Eiselen in 2024

Profile
- Position: Guard

Personal information
- Born: June 10, 1996 (age 30); Pretoria, South Africa
- Listed height: 6 ft 4 in (1.93 m)
- Listed weight: 315 lb (143 kg)

Career information
- High school: Paul Roos Gymnasium (Stellenbosch, South Africa); Choate Rosemary Hall (Wallingford, Connecticut)
- College: Yale (2016–2019)
- NFL draft: 2020: undrafted

Career history
- Chicago Bears (2020–2022); Houston Texans (2023); Denver Broncos (2024)*; San Francisco 49ers (2024)*; Jacksonville Jaguars (2024–2025)
- * Offseason or practice squad member only

Awards and highlights
- First-team FCS All-American (2019); 2× First-team All-Ivy League (2018–2019)

Career NFL statistics as of 2023
- Games played: 26
- Stats at Pro Football Reference

Dieter Johann Eiselen (born June 10, 1996) is a South African professional American football guard. He played college football for the Yale Bulldogs. Eiselen was signed as an undrafted free agent by the Chicago Bears after the 2020 NFL draft and became the first South African non-kicker to be active in an NFL game his rookie year.

== Early life ==
Eiselen was born and raised in South Africa where he played rugby union and competed in Olympic weightlifting. Eiselen came to the United States and played football at Choate Rosemary Hall in Wallingford, Connecticut and helped lead the Wild Boars to an undefeated season and a New England NEPSAC 'A' Championship. Eiselen was also a track and field athlete and made the Dean's List.

== College career ==
Eiselen graduated from Yale University in 2020 with degrees in economics and political science. Eiselen started 34 games as a four-year starter for the Yale Bulldogs. In 2017, Eiselen was selected as a HERO Sports Sophomore All-American and an All-Ivy League honorable mention after helping lead the Yale Bulldogs to an outright Ivy League Championship. In 2018, he was selected First-Team All-Ivy League. In 2019, he was selected to Phil Steele's Preseason All-American Team, First-team All-Ivy League, the ECAC All-New England Team, the HERO Sports All-American Team, the STATS FCS All-American Team, and the AP FCS All-American Team after helping Yale to a no. 23/22 and a second Ivy League championship. Eiselen was selected to participate in the NFLPA Collegiate Bowl in Pasadena, California at the Rose Bowl. He was also inducted into National Football Foundation's Hampshire Honor Society.

== Professional career ==
Pre-draft measurables
Height	Weight	Arm length	Hand span
6 ft 4 in (1.93 m)	308 lb (140 kg)	32 1/2 in (0.83 m)	9 1/2 in (0.24 m)
All values from Pro Day

=== Chicago Bears ===
Eiselen was signed by the Chicago Bears as an undrafted free agent on May 7, 2020. He was elevated to the active roster on November 7, 2020 and became the first South African non-kicker to be active in an NFL game. On January 11, 2021, Eiselen signed a reserve/reserve/futures contract with the Bears. He signed a reserve/future contract with the Bears on January 11, 2022. Eiselen was promoted to the active roster on October 26. On February 22, 2023, Eiselen was tendered as an exclusive rights free agent.

=== Houston Texans ===
On August 31, 2023, Eiselen was signed by the Houston Texans. He was promoted to the active roster on November 11.

On February 24, 2024, Eiselen signed a two-year contract extension. On August 26, he was waived by the Texans.

=== Denver Broncos ===
On October 8, 2024, Eiselen was signed to the Denver Broncos. On October 19, the Broncos released him.

=== San Francisco 49ers ===
On October 23, 2024, Eiselen was signed to the San Francisco 49ers. He was released on November 7.

=== Jacksonville Jaguars ===
On November 12, 2024, Eiselen was signed to the Jacksonville Jaguars. He signed a reserve/future contract with Jacksonville on January 6, 2025. On March 28, Eiselen was waived by the Jaguars.
