= Lachavious Simmons =

American football player (born 1996)

Profile
- Position: Offensive tackle

Personal information
- Born: September 12, 1996 (age 30); Selma, Alabama, U.S.
- Listed height: 6 ft 5 in (1.96 m)
- Listed weight: 319 lb (145 kg)

Career information
- High school: Selma
- College: Tennessee State (2015–2019)
- NFL draft: 2020: 7th round, 227th overall pick

Career history
- Chicago Bears (2020–2022); Arizona Cardinals (2022–2023)*; Tennessee Titans (2023–2024)*; Birmingham Stallions (2025)
- * Offseason or practice squad member only

Career NFL statistics
- Games played: 2
- Games started: 1
- Stats at Pro Football Reference

Lachavious Simmons (born September 12, 1996) is an American professional football offensive tackle. He played college football at Tennessee State.

== College career ==
A native of Selma, Alabama, Simmons started six games at left guard as a junior at Tennessee State in 2018. He started 12 games in 2019 as left guard and left tackle and helped propel an offense that averaged over 400 yards per game. Simmons was a first-team all-Ohio Valley Conference selection. He also played in College Gridiron Showcase and the Hula Bowl all-star game.

== Professional career ==
Pre-draft measurables
Height	Weight	Arm length	Hand span
6 ft 5 in (1.96 m)	304 lb (138 kg)	35 1/8 in (0.89 m)	9 3/4 in (0.25 m)
All values from Pro Day

=== Chicago Bears ===
Simmons was selected by the Chicago Bears with the 227th overall pick in the seventh round of the 2020 NFL draft. He was the only player from a historically black college and university selected in the draft. He signed a four-year rookie contract with the team on July 21. He was released as part of final roster cuts on September 5, and was added to the practice squad the following day. He was promoted to the active roster on November 3, 2020. He was placed on the reserve/COVID-19 list by the team on November 8, 2020, and activated on November 20.

On August 30, 2022, Simmons was waived by the Bears and signed to the practice squad the next day. He was released by the team on September 12.

=== Arizona Cardinals ===
On September 20, 2022, Simmons signed with the practice squad of the Arizona Cardinals. He was placed on the practice squad/injured list on October 5, 2022. He was activated from the practice squad/injured list on December 28, 2022. He signed a reserve/future contract on January 11, 2023.

On August 21, 2023, Simmons was waived by the Cardinals.

=== Tennessee Titans ===
On November 7, 2023, Simmons was signed to the Tennessee Titans practice squad. Following the end of the 2023 regular season, the Titans signed him to a reserve/future contract on January 8, 2024. Simmons was waived/injured by the Titans on August 27, 2024.

=== Birmingham Stallions ===
On December 10, 2024, Simmons signed with the Birmingham Stallions of the United Football League (UFL). He was placed on injured reserve on April 28, 2025.
