= 2019 Chicago Bears season =

100th season in franchise history

- The Bears' centennial season logo, modeled upon the league-wide logo used for the NFL's centennial.
- Owner: The McCaskey Family
- General manager: Ryan Pace
- Head coach: Matt Nagy
- Home stadium: Soldier Field

Results
- Record: 8–8
- Division place: 3rd NFC North
- Playoffs: Did not qualify
- All-Pros: KR Cordarrelle Patterson (1st team); ST Cordarrelle Patterson (2nd team)
- Pro Bowlers: FS Eddie Jackson; OLB Khalil Mack; ST Cordarrelle Patterson; CB Kyle Fuller (alternate)

Uniform
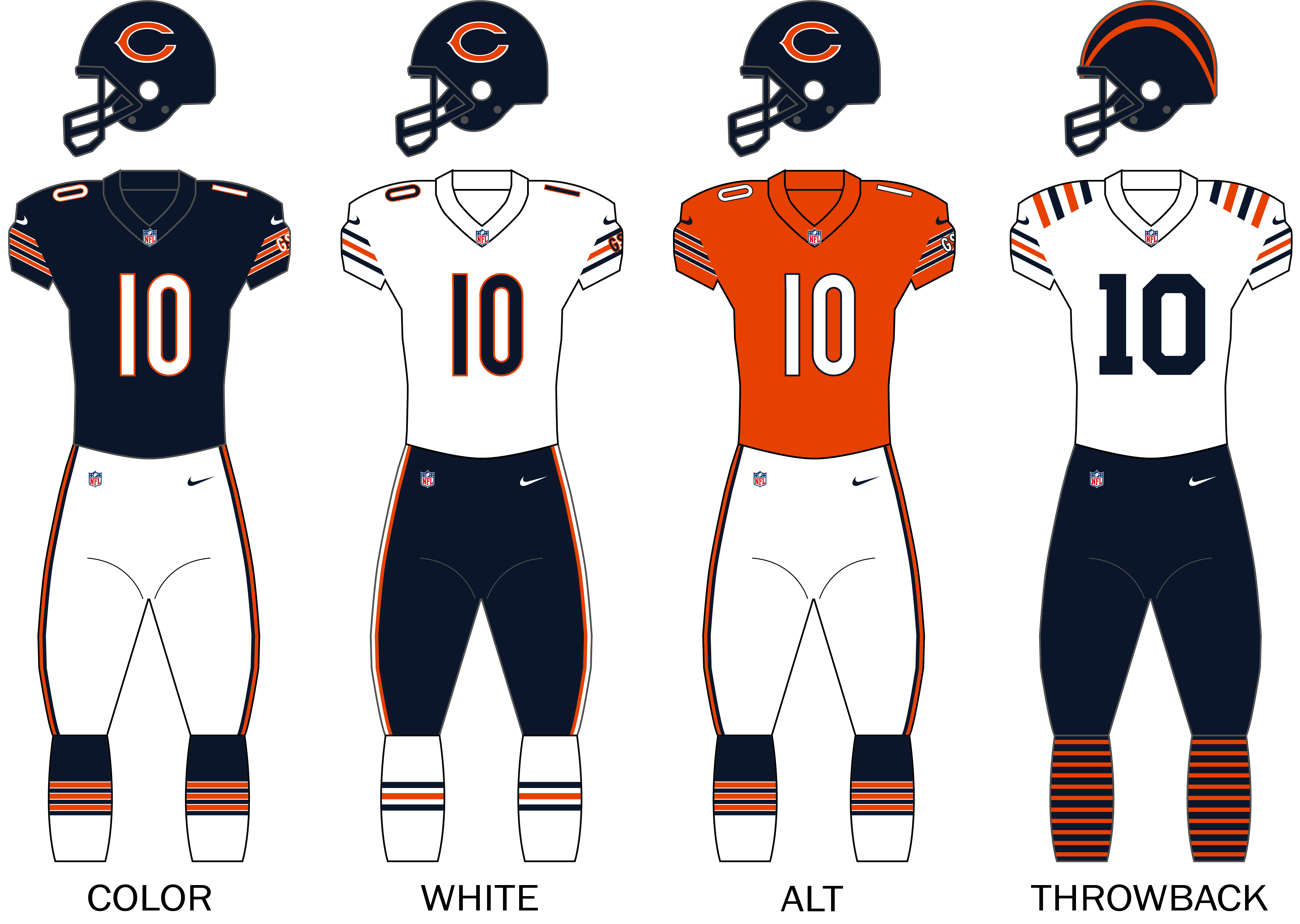

The 2019 season was the Chicago Bears' 100th in the National Football League (NFL) and their second under head coach Matt Nagy. The season was branded as "Bears100" to celebrate the franchise's centennial, which included a commemorative patch on jerseys and a new throwback uniform.

Despite a 3–1 start, the Bears embarked on a four-game losing streak. After losing to the Philadelphia Eagles to fall to 3–5, they rebounded by winning four of their next five but were unable to improve upon their 12–4 record from 2018. A Week 15 loss to the Green Bay Packers coupled with the Minnesota Vikings beating the Los Angeles Chargers later that day eliminated them from playoff contention. Chicago ended the season with an 8–8 record and third in the NFC North. The offense struggled throughout the year, while the defense continued to rank in the top ten in multiple categories; the Bears were the only team to not make the playoffs despite being in the top five in fewest points allowed per game.

== Offseason ==
=== Organizational changes ===
On January 9, defensive coordinator Vic Fangio, who guided the Bears to the top-ranked scoring defense in 2018, left the team to become head coach of the Denver Broncos. Two days later, Chicago hired former Indianapolis Colts' head coach Chuck Pagano to take over the position; before joining the Colts in 2012, he served as the Baltimore Ravens' defensive coordinator for one season in 2011, during which they ranked third in total defense. In assembling his defensive staff, Pagano chose not to retain outside linebackers coach Brandon Staley and assistant defensive backs coach Roy Anderson, both of whom had been with the Bears since 2017, and inside linebackers coach Glenn Pires, who had been on the Bears staff since 2015. Staley and defensive backs coach Ed Donatell followed Fangio to the Broncos. Following the moves, line coach Jay Rodgers and quality control coaches Bill Shuey and Sean Desai were the remaining defensive assistants; on February 8, Shuey and Desai were promoted to defensive pass analyst/assistant linebackers coach and safeties coach, respectively.

Pagano began replacing the departures by hiring Deshea Townsend as defensive backs coach and Ronell Williams as defensive quality control coach on January 18. Townsend was a two-time Super Bowl champion cornerback with the Pittsburgh Steelers before becoming a coach; he was most recently the assistant defensive backs coach of the New York Giants. Williams, a defensive analyst for the Temple Owls football team, worked with the Bears during Training Camp in 2018 as a member of the Bill Walsh Diversity Coaching Fellowship; former Arena Football League wide receiver Chris Jackson, who also participated in the program, was hired as a defensive assistant on February 12. On January 21, former Kansas State defensive coordinator Ted Monachino was hired as senior defensive assistant and outside linebackers coach; Monachino worked with Pagano in Baltimore and Indianapolis, the latter as defensive coordinator. The Bears later added Kansas City Chiefs inside linebackers coach Mark DeLeone to serve the same position, reuniting him with Nagy.

On May 1, Brad Childress rejoined the team as a senior offensive assistant. During the 2018 offseason and training camp, Childress had worked with Nagy and the Bears as a consultant; the two had been acquainted as co-offensive coordinators in Kansas City.

=== Roster changes ===
Position	Player	Free agency Tag	Date signed	2019 team
SS	Adrian Amos	UFA	March 13	Green Bay Packers
WR	Josh Bellamy	UFA	March 13	New York Jets
TE	Ben Braunecker	RFA	March 11	Chicago Bears
QB	Tyler Bray	UFA	March 20	Chicago Bears
TE	Daniel Brown	UFA	March 18	New York Jets
FB	Michael Burton	UFA	May 13	New Orleans Saints
CB	Bryce Callahan	UFA	March 15	Denver Broncos
OL	Rashaad Coward	ERFA	April 5	Chicago Bears
RB	Benny Cunningham	UFA	April 2	Jacksonville Jaguars
SS	DeAndre Houston-Carson	UFA	March 29	Chicago Bears
LB	Isaiah Irving	ERFA	April 15	Chicago Bears
OL	Eric Kush	UFA	March 14	Cleveland Browns
LB	Aaron Lynch	UFA	April 1	Chicago Bears
OT	Bobby Massie	UFA	January 26	Chicago Bears
TE	Zach Miller	UFA	April 25	
P	Pat O'Donnell	UFA	March 18	Chicago Bears
DE	Roy Robertson-Harris	ERFA	March 13	Chicago Bears
LS	Patrick Scales	UFA	April 3	Chicago Bears
WR	Kevin White	UFA	March 15	Arizona Cardinals
CB	Marcus Williams	UFA		
DE	Nick Williams	UFA	March 15	Chicago Bears
OL	Bryan Witzmann	UFA	March 22	Cleveland Browns

Entering the 2019 offseason, the Bears had 21 players set to become free agents, including three restricted free agents and three exclusive-rights free agents. Two of the restricted free agents, safety DeAndre Houston-Carson and long snapper Patrick Scales, became unrestricted free agents when the Bears did not extend qualifying offers to them.

==== Acquisitions ====
Two days after their 2018 season ended, on January 8, the Bears signed ten players to futures/reserve contracts, nine of whom were part of the practice squad in 2018: running back Ryan Nall; offensive lineman Dejon Allen; defensive tackle Abdullah Anderson; linebacker Josh Woods; defensive backs John Franklin III, Cyril Grayson, Michael Joseph and Jonathon Mincy; and Canadian Football League player James Vaughters, who last played for the Calgary Stampeders. Later in the month, Chicago signed receiver Jordan Williams-Lambert and linebacker Jameer Thurman—also CFL players—New Orleans Saints offensive tackle Cornelius Lucas and Tulsa kicker Redford Jones. A second kicker, Pittsburgh Panthers alumnus Chris Blewitt, was signed on March 6.

The NFL conducted a two-day negotiation period for incoming unrestricted free agents on March 11–12, with free agency beginning the next day. During the period, running back Mike Davis, wide receiver Cordarrelle Patterson and cornerback Buster Skrine committed to signing with the Bears, with Davis and Patterson finalizing two-year contracts and Skrine a three-year deal when free agency opened. With the Seattle Seahawks, Davis recorded 514 rushing yards and four touchdowns, along with 214 receiving yards and two touchdowns in 2018; on the New England Patriots in 2018, Patterson had 247 receiving yards and three touchdowns, along with 42 carries for 228 yards and a touchdown as a running back and averaging 28.8 kickoff return yards as a return specialist; in 14 games for the 2018 New York Jets, Skrine had a forced fumble, a fumble recovery and four tackles for loss, with Matt Nagy calling him "one of the better nickels in this league, if not the best".

At the start of free agency on March 13, the Bears signed Miami Dolphins offensive lineman Ted Larsen, who started eight games for Chicago in 2016, to a one-year agreement. The following day, safety Ha Ha Clinton-Dix, who played for the Green Bay Packers and Washington Redskins in 2018, joined Chicago on a one-year deal. Atlanta Falcons wide receiver Marvin Hall signed with the Bears on March 15; a fast player, he recorded ten receptions for 149 yards and a touchdown, along with 616 kickoff return yards in 2018.

On April 12, kicker Elliott Fry, who was a member of the Alliance of American Football's Orlando Apollos until the league's shutdown ten days prior, was signed to a three-year deal. A month later, on May 8, the Bears picked up Jets linebacker Kevin Pierre-Louis, who played in Kansas City with Nagy in 2017.

==== Departures ====
On February 21, tight end Dion Sims was released with one year left on his contract; he was on injured reserve for half of the 2018 season and caught only two passes. The following day, it was reported kicker Cody Parkey would be released at the start of the league year on March 13 after 11 missed kicks in 2018 and $3.5 million guaranteed still on his 2019 contract. Linebacker Sam Acho, who spent much of 2018 on injured reserve, was let go on March 5.

Once free agency began, various unrestricted free agents opted to sign with other teams, including strong safety Adrian Amos, who signed with the Packers, and cornerback Bryce Callahan joining the Denver Broncos. Departing non-starters included running back Benny Cunningham to the Jacksonville Jaguars, fullback Michael Burton to the New Orleans Saints, wide receivers Josh Bellamy and Kevin White respectively to the Jets and Arizona Cardinals, tight end Daniel Brown with the Jets, and offensive linemen Eric Kush and Bryan Witzmann with the Cleveland Browns.

On March 28, running back Jordan Howard, who struggled to adapt to Nagy's offense as he recorded a career-worst 935 rushing yards and nine touchdowns in 2018, was traded to the Philadelphia Eagles for a conditional sixth-round pick in 2020.

After suffering a serious injury in a 2017 game that forced him to miss the entire 2018 season, tight end Zach Miller announced his retirement on April 16. Nine days later, the Bears officially released Miller with a failed physical designation.

On May 3, wide receiver Cyril Grayson and offensive linemen Dejon Allen and Willie Beavers were waived. Grayson and Beavers were on the Bears' practice squad in 2018, while Allen joined the team in May 2018 but did not play in the regular season.

=== NFL draft ===
In a press conference on April 23, two days before the 2019 NFL draft, general manager Ryan Pace explained the team did not have "pressing, huge needs" and "can honestly select the best players". The Bears entered the draft without picks in the first two rounds after trading the first rounder (No. 24 overall, Josh Jacobs) to the Oakland Raiders for linebacker Khalil Mack and the second rounder (No. 56) to the New England Patriots for their 2018 fourth-round selection, respectively. It was the first draft since 2010 in which the Bears did not have first- nor second-round picks.

During the draft, the Bears traded with the Patriots once again with an exchange that sent the former's third- (No. 87) and fifth-round (No. 162) for the latter's third- (No. 73) and sixth-round (No. 205) selections, and a fourth-round pick in the 2020 draft. With New England's 73rd-overall selection, Chicago drafted Iowa State running back David Montgomery; in 2018, Montgomery led the NCAA Division I Football Bowl Subdivision in missed tackles forced with 99, along with recording 24 rushing touchdowns and averaging 4.7 yards per carry and 8.2 yards per reception in his three-year college career. In the fourth round, the Bears used the 126th-overall on receiver Riley Ridley, who had 70 receptions for 1,026 yards (14.7 yards per catch) and 13 touchdowns at Georgia.

Two rounds later, the Bears' No. 205 was used on Kansas State cornerback Duke Shelley; although his 2018 season was marred by a toe injury, Shelley recorded 33 tackles and three interceptions that year. In four years at Kansas State, Shelley had 165 career tackles and eight interceptions. With their two seventh-round picks, Chicago drafted Florida Atlantic running back Kerrith Whyte Jr. (No. 222) and Valdosta State cornerback Stephen Denmark (No. 238). Whyte attracted Pace's attention with his speed, running a 4.38-second 40-yard dash, and was a running back and return specialist at FAU; in 2018, Whyte had 134 carries for 866 yards and eight touchdowns, along with 19 kickoff returns for an average of 28.7 yards and a touchdown. A receiver who was converted to cornerback for his final year at Valdosta State, Denmark recorded 55 tackles and three interceptions in 2018.

Following the draft, the Bears signed 22 undrafted free agents: receivers Emanuel Hall (Missouri) and Thomas Ives (Colgate); tight ends Ian Bunting (California), Dax Raymond (Utah State) and Ellis Richardson (Georgia Southern); offensive linemen Alex Bars and Sam Mustipher (Notre Dame), Blake Blackmar (Baylor), Joe Lowery (Ohio) and Marquez Tucker (Southern Utah); defensive linemen Daryle Banfield (Brown), Jonathan Harris (Lindenwood) and Lawrence Marshall (Michigan); linebackers Mathieu Betts (Laval) and Chuck Harris (Buffalo); defensive backs Jomon Dotson (Nevada), Clifton Duck (Appalachian State), Doyin Jibowu (Fort Hays State), Adarius Pickett (UCLA) and Josh Simmons (Limestone); kicker John Baron II (San Diego State); and long snapper John Wirtel (Kansas).

Ridley, Whyte and Denmark signed their four-year rookie contracts on May 13, while Montgomery did so on June 14. Shelley completed the draft signings on June 20.

2019 Chicago Bears draft
Round	Pick	Player	Position	College	Notes
3	73	David Montgomery	RB	Iowa State	
4	126	Riley Ridley	WR	Georgia	
6	205	Duke Shelley	CB	Kansas State	
7	222	Kerrith Whyte Jr.	RB	FAU	
7	238	Stephen Denmark	CB	Valdosta State	
Made roster * Made at least one Pro Bowl during career

Notes

- The Bears traded their 2019 first- and sixth-round selections (Nos. 24 and 196 overall, respectively), as well as their 2020 first- and third-round selections to the Oakland Raiders in exchange for linebacker Khalil Mack; the Bears will also receive a 2020 second-round selection and a conditional fifth-round selection in 2020 from the Raiders.
- The Bears traded their second-round selection (No. 56 overall) along with a 2018 fourth-round selection to the New England Patriots in exchange for the Patriots' 2018 second-round selection. The 56th overall pick was used to draft Anthony Miller.
- The Bears acquired an additional seventh-round selection (No. 222 overall) in a trade that sent cornerback Deiondre' Hall to the Philadelphia Eagles.
- The Bears acquired the New England Patriots third and sixth round pick (73rd overall and 205th overall, respectively) in exchange for the Bears' third round pick (87th overall), fifth round pick (162nd overall), plus a 2020 fourth round pick.

=== Offseason activities ===
The Bears began offseason workouts on April 15. NFL rules stipulate teams may hold a voluntary nine-week program that is divided into three phases: the first phase, running for the first two weeks, may only consist of physical conditioning; the three-week second phase involves position drills but no contact nor offense against defense; the third phase has ten offseason team activities (OTAs) in which teams conduct drills between offenses and defenses without contact. Chicago's voluntary mini-camp was held on April 23–25, with OTAs on May 21–23, May 29–31 and June 4–7, and a required mini-camp on June 11–13.

On May 3–5, Chicago held a rookie mini-camp for draft picks, undrafted free agents and others on a tryout basis. The Bears, who had struggled with kicking success since 2016 (they had the second-worst field goal conversion percentage during the stretch), invited eight kickers to the camp: Blewitt, Fry, Jones and Baron were under contract, while Notre Dame's Justin Yoon, Minnesota's Emmit Carpenter, Minnesota State's Casey Bernardski and Purdue's Spencer Evans were tryouts. McNeese State punter Alex Kjellsten also participated in the session; he described the camp as "almost like a combine for kickers", with the Bears conducting measurements and analysis of each kick. In conjunction with the kicker competition, the team hired Jamie Kohl, director of the Kohl's Professional Camps kicking organization, as a kicking consultant for the 2019 season.

At the rookie camp's conclusion, Jones and Baron were released and none of the tryouts were signed, leaving Blewitt and Fry as the remaining kickers. Marshall and Pickett were also waived, while offensive lineman Tommy Doles and defensive lineman Jalen Dalton—all tryouts at the camp—received contracts. On May 6, the Bears traded a conditional 2021 seventh-round draft pick for Raiders kicker Eddy Piñeiro; in his rookie year in 2018, Piñeiro made all three of his preseason field goals, but missed the regular season with a groin injury. Under the conditions of the trade, the Raiders would receive the pick if Piñeiro was on the Bears' active roster for at least five games in 2019. Princeton receiver-turned-tight end Jesper Horsted was signed on May 13, with Doles being released to make room before he was brought back three days later after Dotson was waived/injured. Doles was waived once again on May 31 to make room for offensive lineman T. J. Clemmings, who started 32 games in his four-year career for the Minnesota Vikings and Raiders.

The mandatory mini-camp began in mid-June. After the first day, during which he, Fry and Piñeiro all missed 42-yard field goals, Blewitt was released on June 12. Offensive lineman Jordan McCray was signed the next day.

Bears Training Camp commenced in late July, with rookies and quarterbacks reporting on July 22 and veterans three days later. The first practice was conducted on July 27. During camp, on August 3, Simmons was waived with an injury designation and replaced by Delaware receiver Joe Walker, who attended the Bears' rookie mini-camp.

=== Centennial promotions ===
The 2019 season marks the Bears' 100th season as a franchise, dating to the NFL's inaugural season in 1920 as the American Professional Football Association (APFA) and the team's debut as the Decatur Staleys. Of the original 14 teams in the NFL (then the American Professional Football Association) that year, only the Bears and Arizona Cardinals (then in Chicago) are still in existence.

The team unveiled a customized version of the NFL's centennial emblem, which is being used in place of the league-wide version on jerseys. On June 7–9, the team held the Bears100 Celebration Weekend at the Donald E. Stephens Convention Center in Rosemont, Illinois. At the celebration, the team revealed throwback uniforms inspired by the 1936 team to be worn against the Minnesota Vikings and Dallas Cowboys.

In July, the team revealed each home game would honor a particular decade with bobbleheads of certain players from that time frame being given away. For the New York Giants game, which represented the 1960s, the Bears wore throwback helmets with a white 'C' logo and gray facemask.

== Staff ==
2019 Chicago Bears staff
Front office: Secretary of the board of directors – Virginia Halas McCaskey; Chairman – George McCaskey; President/CEO – Ted Phillips; General manager – Ryan Pace; Vice-president & general counsel – Cliff Stein; Director of player personnel – Josh Lucas; Assistant director of player personnel – Champ Kelly; Director of college scouting – Mark Sadowski; Director of football administration – Joey Laine; Head coaches: Head coach – Matt Nagy; Offensive coaches: Offensive coordinator – Mark Helfrich; Quarterbacks – Dave Ragone; Running backs – Charles London; Wide receivers – Mike Furrey; Tight ends – Kevin M. Gilbride; Offensive line – Harry Hiestand; Assistant offensive line – Donovan Raiola; Senior offensive assistant – Brad Childress; Offensive assistant – Shane Toub; Offensive quality control – Brian Ginn; Offensive quality control – Mike Snyder	Defensive coaches: Defensive coordinator – Chuck Pagano; Defensive line – Jay Rodgers; Senior defensive assistant/Outside linebackers – Ted Monachino; Pass rush analyst/Assistant linebackers – Bill Shuey; Inside linebackers – Mark DeLeone; Secondary – Deshea Townsend; Safeties – Sean Desai; Defensive assistant – Chris Jackson; Defensive quality control – Ronell Williams; Special teams coaches: Special teams coordinator – Chris Tabor; Assistant special teams – Brock Olivo; Kicking consultant – Jamie Kohl; Strength and conditioning: Strength and conditioning – Jason Loscalzo; Assistant strength and conditioning – Casey Kramer; Strength and conditioning assistant – Pierre Ngo; Head athletic trainer – Andre Tucker

== Final roster ==
2019 Chicago Bears roster
Quarterbacks (QB): 4 Chase Daniel; 10 Mitchell Trubisky; Running backs (RB): 29 Tarik Cohen PR; 32 David Montgomery; 35 Ryan Nall; Wide receivers (WR): 18 Taylor Gabriel; 17 Anthony Miller; 84 Cordarrelle Patterson; 88 Riley Ridley; 12 Allen Robinson; 83 Javon Wims; Tight ends (TE): 81 J. P. Holtz; 49 Jesper Horsted; 43 Eric Saubert; 85 Bradley Sowell	Offensive linemen (OL): 64 Alex Bars G; 69 Rashaad Coward G; 68 James Daniels G; 62 Ted Larsen C; 72 Charles Leno T; 60 Corey Levin G; 73 Cornelius Lucas T; 70 Bobby Massie T; 65 Cody Whitehair C; Defensive linemen (DL): 76 Abdullah Anderson DE; 91 Eddie Goldman NT; 96 Akiem Hicks DE; 98 Bilal Nichols DE; 95 Roy Robertson-Harris DE; 97 Nick Williams; 92 Brent Urban DE	Linebackers (LB): 53 Devante Bond OLB; 94 Leonard Floyd OLB; 47 Isaiah Irving OLB; 45 Joel Iyiegbuniwe ILB; 44 Nick Kwiatkoski ILB; 99 Aaron Lynch OLB; 52 Khalil Mack OLB; 57 Kevin Pierre-Louis ILB; 55 Josh Woods ILB; Defensive backs (DB): 20 Prince Amukamara CB; 26 Deon Bush FS; 21 Ha Ha Clinton-Dix SS; 23 Kyle Fuller CB; 36 DeAndre Houston-Carson SS; 39 Eddie Jackson FS; 30 Michael Joseph CB; 33 Duke Shelley CB; 24 Buster Skrine CB; 22 Kevin Toliver CB; Special teams (ST): 15 Eddy Piñeiro K; 16 Pat O'Donnell P; 48 Patrick Scales LS	Practice squad: 78 Dino Boyd T; 9 Tyler Bray QB; 90 Fadol Brown DE (IR); 25 Xavier Crawford CB; 19 Reggie Davis WR; 37 Stephen Denmark CB; 14 Thomas Ives WR; 67 Sam Mustipher C; 46 Dax Raymond TE; 93 James Vaughters OLB; 13 Alex Wesley WR; Reserve: 82 Ben Braunecker TE (IR); 80 Trey Burton TE (IR); 79 T. J. Clemmings T (IR); 75 Kyle Long G (IR); 27 Sherrick McManis CB (IR); 87 Adam Shaheen TE (IR); 58 Roquan Smith ILB (IR); 59 Danny Trevathan ILB (IR); Rookies in italics 53 active, 9 reserve, 10 practice squad

== Preseason ==
The Bears' preseason opponents, along with that of the rest of the NFL teams, were announced on April 9, 2019.

=== Schedule ===
Week	Date	Opponent	Result	Record	Game site	NFL.com recap
1	August 8	Carolina Panthers	L 13–23	0–1	Soldier Field	Recap
2	August 16	at New York Giants	L 13–32	0–2	MetLife Stadium	Recap
3	August 24	at Indianapolis Colts	W 27–17	1–2	Lucas Oil Stadium	Recap
4	August 29	Tennessee Titans	L 15–19	1–3	Soldier Field	Recap

=== Game summaries ===
The preseason began at home against the Carolina Panthers, with much of the Bears' starters not seeing action. Chicago's defense forced two turnovers with Josh Woods forcing Elijah Holyfield to fumble and James Vaughters recovering, along with Deon Bush intercepting a Will Grier pass; although the first takeaway set up David Montgomery’s -yard touchdown, Eddy Piñeiro missed a 48-yard field goal after the second. Elliott Fry and Piñeiro also made 43- and 23-yard kicks, but the Bears were defeated 23–13 with Holyfield catching and rushing for two touchdowns and Joey Slye making three field goals.

Games two and three were on the road against the New York Giants and Indianapolis Colts. No starters played in the former as backup defenders Vaughters and Clifton Duck recording a fumble recovery and interception, respectively. Kerrith Whyte Jr. scored the Bears' only touchdown (a one-yard run in the third quarter) in the 32–13 defeat, while he also had a 108-yard kickoff return touchdown called back for a holding penalty. Piñeiro made 41- and 27-yard field goals in the Giants game, while Fry missed a 47-yard kick and made an extra point; the latter would be released days later. Chuck Pagano’s return to Indianapolis was largely overshadowed by reports of Colts starting quarterback Andrew Luck's retirement, sparking boos in Lucas Oil Stadium after the game. Offensive coordinator Mark Helfrich called offensive plays for the Bears in the game. After trailing 17–7, Chicago scored 20 unanswered points starting with Piñeiro's 58-yard field goal, followed by Vaughters forcing Phillip Walker to fumble on a sack, with Joel Iyiegbuniwe returning the loose ball 22 yards for a touchdown. Iyiegbuniwe and Doyin Jibowu then recorded a sack and interception on consecutive defensive stands, while Tyler Bray threw a 17-yard touchdown pass to Jesper Horsted as the Bears won 27–17.

To end the preseason, the Bears hosted the Tennessee Titans. 2019 is the first year in which the Bears and Titans regularly play each other in the preseason as part of an agreement between the teams; it is Chicago's first preseason partnership since their affiliation with the Cleveland Browns in 2004–2017. Quarterbacks coach Dave Ragone served as play-caller as Bray played the full game, completing 28 of 40 passes for 334 yards, one touchdown and a 103.5 passer rating. Horsted caught five passes for 82 yards and a touchdown, while Piñeiro went from missing the ensuing extra point to making field goals from 32, 39 and 35 yards. However, Tennessee's Logan Woodside threw two touchdown passes, including the game-winning four-yard score to Dalyn Dawkins as the Titans won 19–15.

=== Transactions ===
After missing the preseason opener and the start of camp due to a sports hernia, Emanuel Hall was released on August 13. Fry was released on August 18 after making three-of-four kicks in two preseason games. Recently released Kansas City Chiefs running back Josh Caldwell was signed a day later; although he recorded 59 rushing yards and a touchdown in the Chiefs' preseason opener, the team waived him to allow him to pursue opportunities elsewhere as it was unlikely he would make their 53-man roster.

A day after the Bears' game against the Colts, during which offensive linemen T. J. Clemmings and Rashaad Coward suffered injuries, Tommy Doles was claimed off waivers from the Atlanta Falcons, marking Chicago's third transaction involving the lineman. Clemmings would be placed on injured reserve with a quad injury.

On August 31, the Bears reduced their roster to 53 players by releasing 34 players: Bray, Caldwell, Doles, Duck, Horsted, Jibowu, Vaughters, Daryl Banfield, Alex Bars, Mathieu Betts, Jonathan Bullard, Ian Bunting, Jalen Dalton, Stephen Denmark, Kylie Fitts, John Franklin III, Tanner Gentry, Marvin Hall, Chuck Harris, Jonathan Harris, Thomas Ives, Michael Joseph, Joe Lowery, Jordan McCray, Jonathon Mincy, Taquan Mizzell, Sam Mustipher, Ryan Nall, Ellis Richardson, Jameer Thurman, Marquez Tucker, Joe Walker, Jordan Williams-Lambert and John Wirtel. Dax Raymond and Blake Blackmar were moved to injured reserve.

The following day, Bars, Bray, Denmark, Harris, Horsted, Ives, Joseph, Mustipher, Nall and Vaughters were assigned to the practice squad.

== Regular season ==
=== Schedule ===
The Bears' regular season schedule, along with that of the rest of the NFL, was released on April 17, 2019. Chicago played in five prime time games.

Week	Date	Opponent	Result	Record	Venue	NFL.com recap
1	September 5	**Green Bay Packers**	**L** 3–10	0–1	Soldier Field	Recap
2	September 15	at Denver Broncos	**W** 16–14	1–1	Empower Field at Mile High	Recap
3	September 23	at Washington Redskins	**W** 31–15	2–1	FedEx Field	Recap
4	September 29	**Minnesota Vikings**	**W** 16–6	3–1	Soldier Field	Recap
5	October 6	at Oakland Raiders	**L** 21–24	3–2	(United Kingdom) Tottenham Hotspur Stadium (London)	Recap
6	Bye					
7	October 20	New Orleans Saints	**L** 25–36	3–3	Soldier Field	Recap
8	October 27	Los Angeles Chargers	**L** 16–17	3–4	Soldier Field	Recap
9	November 3	at Philadelphia Eagles	**L** 14–22	3–5	Lincoln Financial Field	Recap
10	November 10	**Detroit Lions**	**W** 20–13	4–5	Soldier Field	Recap
11	November 17	at Los Angeles Rams	**L** 7–17	4–6	Los Angeles Memorial Coliseum	Recap
12	November 24	New York Giants	**W** 19–14	5–6	Soldier Field	Recap
13	November 28	at **Detroit Lions**	**W** 24–20	6–6	Ford Field	Recap
14	December 5	Dallas Cowboys	**W** 31–24	7–6	Soldier Field	Recap
15	December 15	at **Green Bay Packers**	**L** 13–21	7–7	Lambeau Field	Recap
16	December 22	Kansas City Chiefs	**L** 3–26	7–8	Soldier Field	Recap
17	December 29	at **Minnesota Vikings**	**W** 21–19	8–8	U.S. Bank Stadium	Recap
Note: Intra-division opponents are in **bold** text.

=== Game summaries ===
==== Week 1: vs. Green Bay Packers ====
NFL Kickoff Game

Week One: Green Bay Packers at Chicago Bears – Game summary

Quarter	1	2	3	4	Total
**Packers**	0	7	0	3	**10**
Bears	3	0	0	0	**3**

at Soldier Field, Chicago, Illinois

- Date: September 5
- Game time: 7:20 p.m. CDT
- Game weather: Clear, 65 °F (18 °C)
- Game attendance: 62,435
- Referee: Tony Corrente
- TV announcers (NBC): Al Michaels, Cris Collinsworth, Michele Tafoya and Terry McAulay
- Recap, Game Book

Game information

**First quarter**

- CHI – Eddy Piñeiro 38-yard field goal, 4:09. Bears 3–0. **Drive: 6 plays, 16 yards, 3:44.**

**Second quarter**

- GB – Jimmy Graham 8-yard pass from Aaron Rodgers (Mason Crosby kick), 13:08. Packers 7–3. **Drive: 4 play, 74 yards, 1:35.**

**Third quarter**

- No scoring plays.

**Fourth quarter**

- GB – Mason Crosby 39-yard field goal, 5:15. Packers 10–3. **Drive: 10 plays, 73 yards, 6:33.**

**Top passers**

- GB – Aaron Rodgers – 18/30, 203 yards, TD
- CHI – Mitchell Trubisky – 26/45, 228 yards, INT

**Top rushers**

- GB – Aaron Jones – 13 rushes, 39 yards
- CHI – Mike Davis – 5 rushes, 19 yards

**Top receivers**

- GB – Marquez Valdes-Scantling – 4 receptions, 52 yards
- CHI – Allen Robinson – 7 receptions, 102 yards

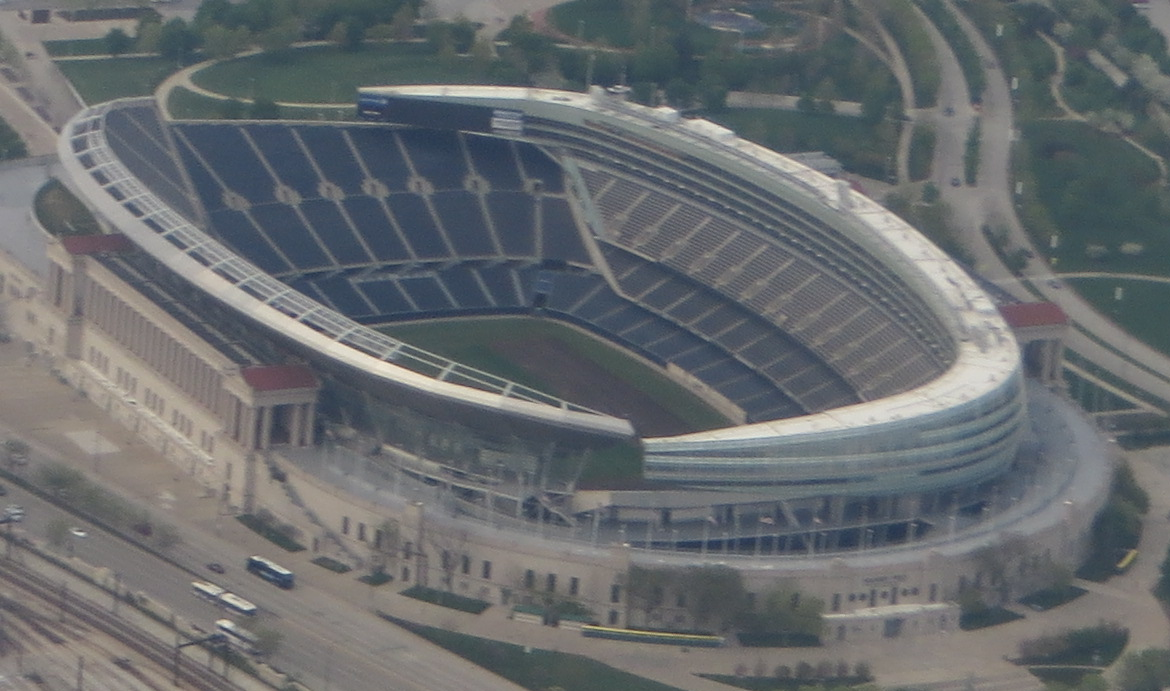
The Bears played every home game at Soldier Field.

For the first game of the 2019 season, the Bears hosted the longtime rival Packers, who led the all-time series 97–95–6. In line with commemorating various decades in team history, the Bears honored the 1980s by inviting members of the 1985 Super Bowl-winning team to exit the tunnel, while more recent former Bears players Brian Urlacher and Jay Cutler were also in attendance. Quarterback Mitchell Trubisky, running back Tarik Cohen, defensive lineman Akiem Hicks, safety Eddie Jackson, offensive lineman Charles Leno and linebacker Khalil Mack served as team captains.

The first three drives ended with punts as the Packers offense recorded negative yardage (−12) before Eddy Piñeiro scored the opening points with a 38-yard field goal. During the second quarter, Packers quarterback Aaron Rodgers led a four-play, 74-yard drive that ended with an eight-yard touchdown pass to Jimmy Graham; the Bears defense had 12 players on the field at the time, granting the Packers a free play. Chicago's offense struggled through the third quarter, including an attempt to convert a fourth-and-10 situation rather than try a 51-yard field goal, which resulted in Trubisky being tackled for a three-yard gain. In the following quarter, the Bears offense had one drive in which they entered Green Bay territory, but holding penalties on Leno pushed them back into their side of the field; on first-and-30, Trubisky threw a 50-yard pass to Taylor Gabriel that was nullified by offensive pass interference on Gabriel. Now requiring 40 yards to earn a first down, the Bears only advanced nine yards before punting. On Green Bay's ensuing drive, they traveled 73 yards to set up Mason Crosby's 39-yard field goal with 5:15 remaining in the game. Although Trubisky and the Bears reached the Packers' 16-yard line, his pass for Allen Robinson was intercepted by former Bears safety Adrian Amos, making his return to Chicago after signing a four-year deal with Green Bay in the offseason, with 1:58 to go. Although the Bears were able to force a Packer punt, Trubisky was sacked on his five-yard line by linebacker Preston Smith to seal the defeat.

Although the defense recorded five sacks, Chicago's offense only ran 15 times as Trubisky attempted 45 passes, the latter of which head coach Matt Nagy assumed responsibility during a Friday press conference. In regards to his play-calling in the loss, he said it "wasn't good enough. And I told the players that. I told them that last night in the locker room, it starts with me. I need to be better. And I will be better. And I'm going to demand that from myself, from our coaches and from our players."

==== Week 2: at Denver Broncos ====
Week Two: Chicago Bears at Denver Broncos – Game summary

Quarter	1	2	3	4	Total
**Bears**	0	6	7	3	**16**
Broncos	3	0	0	11	**14**

at Empower Field at Mile High, Denver, Colorado

- Date: September 15
- Game time: 3:25 p.m. CDT/2:25 p.m. MDT
- Game weather: Mostly sunny, 87 °F (31 °C)
- Game attendance: 76,885
- Referee: Adrian Hill
- TV announcers (Fox): Dick Stockton, Mark Schlereth and Jennifer Hale
- Recap, Game Book

Game information

**First quarter**

- DEN – Brandon McManus 43-yard field goal, 9:45. Broncos 3–0. **Drive: 10 plays, 50 yards, 5:15.**

**Second quarter**

- CHI – Eddy Piñeiro 40-yard field goal, 13:35. Tied 3–3. **Drive: 14 plays, 64 yards, 7:28.**
- CHI – Eddy Piñeiro 52-yard field goal, 5:10. Bears 6–3. **Drive: 10 plays, 56 yards, 4:26.**

**Third quarter**

- CHI – David Montgomery 1-yard run (Eddy Piñeiro kick), 1:14. Bears 13–3. **Drive: 9 plays, 80 yards, 5:30.**

**Fourth quarter**

- DEN – Brandon McManus 32-yard field goal, 13:37. Bears 13–6. **Drive: 9 plays, 61 yards, 2:37.**
- DEN – Emmanuel Sanders 7-yard pass from Joe Flacco (Joe Flacco–Emmanuel Sanders pass), 0:31. Broncos 14–13. **Drive: 12 plays, 62 yards, 2:17.**
- CHI – Eddy Piñeiro 53-yard field goal, 0:00. Bears 16–14. **Drive: 6 plays, 40 yards, 0:31.**

**Top passers**

- CHI – Mitchell Trubisky – 16/27, 120 yards
- DEN – Joe Flacco – 35/50, 292 yards, TD, INT

**Top rushers**

- CHI – David Montgomery – 18 rushes, 62 yards, TD
- DEN – Royce Freeman – 11 rushes, 54 yards

**Top receivers**

- CHI – Allen Robinson – 4 receptions, 41 yards
- DEN – Emmanuel Sanders – 11 receptions, 98 yards, TD

In Week 2, the Bears visited Empower Field at Mile High to play the 0–1 Denver Broncos, led by former Bears defensive coordinator Vic Fangio. The two teams had not played since 2015, a game the Broncos won 17–15. The Bears also dropped their last game in Denver in 2011 13–10. Entering the game, the Broncos held a one-game advantage in the all-time meetings 8–7. During the week leading up to the game, on September 11, Abdullah Anderson was released and tight end J. P. Holtz was claimed off waivers; in his NFL debut the previous week with the Washington Redskins, Holtz exclusively played on special teams. Anderson was later moved to the practice squad, taking James Vaughters' spot, while Dax Raymond was released from injured reserve with a settlement. Linebacker Danny Trevathan, offensive tackle Bobby Massie and Kevin Pierre-Louis were team captains.

The Broncos scored on the opening drive on a 43-yard field goal by Brandon McManus QB Joe Flacco completed all six of his passes on the drive. After two punts, the Bears mounted a 64-yard drive in which the offense converted in two third-downs before Piñeiro kicked a 40-yard field goal to tie the game. After another Broncos punt, Piñeiro added a 52-yard kick with five minutes remaining in the first half to give the Bears a 6–3 lead. The third quarter began with the teams trading punts. On Chicago's next series, the Bears rushing attack led an 80-yard drive, including a 46-yard run by Cordarrelle Patterson, which led to David Montgomery's TD run from 1 yard out to give the Bears' first touchdown of the young season. The score had been set up after four consecutive plays from within Denver's two-yard line. The Broncos, aided by a controversial Eddie Goldman roughing the passer penalty, added a field goal with McManus' 32-yard kick in the fourth quarter. After the Bears punted again, the Denver offense reached Chicago's two-yard line, where Flacco's pass for Emmanuel Sanders was intercepted by Kyle Fuller. The Bears offense could not capitalize on the takeaway and they ended up punting. With 31 seconds left in the game, Flacco threw a 7 yard touchdown pass to Sanders on fourth down. Denver was penalized for a delay of game on their two-point conversion attempt and elected to kick the extra point instead and McManus' missed but the Bears were penalized for being offsides. The Broncos accepted the penalty and decided to go for the two point conversion and were successful on Flacco's pass to Sanders to give the Broncos a 14–13 lead.

Chicago's final drive began at their own 25. After a five-yard gain on a Trubisky pass to Trey Burton, Bradley Chubb was flagged for a controversial roughing the passer penalty to push the Bears to their 45. Trubisky's next three passes fell incomplete. The Bears were penalized for having too many men on the field, pushing back their field position. On fourth-and-15, Trubisky completed a 25-yard pass to Robinson and quickly used the Bears' final timeout with one second left in the game. Piñeiro came out and kicked the game-winning, 53-yard field goal to seal the victory; for his performance, he was named NFC Special Teams Player of the Week.

==== Week 3: at Washington Redskins ====
Week Three: Chicago Bears at Washington Redskins – Game summary

Quarter	1	2	3	4	Total
**Bears**	7	21	0	3	**31**
Redskins	0	3	6	6	**15**

at FedEx Field, Landover, Maryland

- Date: September 23
- Game time: 8:15 p.m. EDT/7:15 p.m. CDT
- Game weather: Cloudy, 87 °F (31 °C)
- Game attendance: 67,327
- Referee: Walt Anderson
- TV announcers (ESPN): Joe Tessitore, Booger McFarland and Lisa Salters
- Recap, Game Book

Game information

**First quarter**

- CHI – Ha Ha Clinton-Dix 37-yard interception return (Eddy Piñeiro kick), 9:42. Bears 7–0.

**Second quarter**

- CHI – Taylor Gabriel 3-yard pass from Mitchell Trubisky (Eddy Piñeiro kick), 7:00. Bears 14–0. **Drive: 11 plays, 67 yards, 6:23.**
- CHI – Taylor Gabriel 1-yard pass from Mitchell Trubisky (Eddy Piñeiro kick), 5:42. Bears 21–0. **Drive: 2 plays, 11 yards, 0:46.**
- CHI – Taylor Gabriel 36-yard pass from Mitchell Trubisky (Eddy Piñeiro kick), 0:43. Bears 28–0. **Drive: 9 plays, 63 yards, 4:23.**
- WAS – Dustin Hopkins 35-yard field goal, 0:00. Bears 28–3. **Drive: 5 plays, 56 yards, 0:43.**

**Third quarter**

- WAS – Terry McLaurin 15-yard pass from Case Keenum (pass failed), 6:39. Bears 28–9. **Drive: 8 plays, 66 yards, 3:37.**

**Fourth quarter**

- WAS – Paul Richardson 2-yard pass from Case Keenum (pass failed), 13:11. Bears 28–15. **Drive: 12 plays, 97 yards, 4:56.**
- CHI – Eddy Piñeiro 38-yard field goal, 1:50. Bears 31–15. **Drive: 10 plays, 58 yards, 5:12.**

**Top passers**

- CHI – Mitchell Trubisky – 25/31, 231 yards, 3 TD, INT
- WAS – Case Keenum – 30/43, 332 yards, 2 TD, 3 INT

**Top rushers**

- CHI – David Montgomery – 13 rushes, 67 yards
- WAS – Adrian Peterson – 12 rushes, 37 yards

**Top receivers**

- CHI – Taylor Gabriel – 6 receptions, 75 yards, 3 TD
- WAS – Paul Richardson – 8 receptions, 83 yards, TD

In their first ever meeting on Monday Night Football, Chicago visited the 0–2 Washington Redskins, who entered the game leading the all-time series 26–23–1. The Bears had lost seven consecutive games to the Redskins, including a 41–21 defeat in their last meeting in 2016 and 45–41 in their most recent game in Washington in 2013. Before the game, tight end Bradley Sowell was released and Anderson was promoted to take his roster spot; the move came after defensive tackle Bilal Nichols broke his hand in Week 2. Starting right tackle Massie also missed the game with vertigo-like symptoms, so Cornelius Lucas filled in at the position. Goldman, Gabriel and punter Pat O'Donnell represented the Bears as their captains.

The Bears punted after their first drive stalled at midfield, but Ha Ha Clinton-Dix intercepted Redskins quarterback Case Keenum's pass on the resulting series and returned it 37 yards for his first career touchdown; it was the Redskins' first turnover of the season. The next two possessions of the game ended with punts before Dustin Hopkins missed a 43-yard field goal wide left. From their 33-yard line, the Bears offense completed a 67 yard TD drive on Trubisky’s three-yard touchdown pass to Gabriel. Following a strip-sack by Mack on Keenum, which was recovered by Hicks, Trubisky threw his second touchdown pass to Gabriel from one yard out. Keenum was intercepted by Fuller on his team's ensuing drive to set up Trubisky's third score to Gabriel, this time from 36 yards out. Hopkins kicked a 35-yard FG to put the Redskins on the board as time expired to cut the Bears lead to 28–3. On their opening series of the second half, Keenum was intercepted again by Clinton-Dix. However, Piñeiro missed a 44-yard field goal; he had been struggling with a right knee injury that forced O'Donnell to perform kickoffs. Washington scored on the next drive with 15-yard touchdown pass from Keenum to Terry McLaurin, followed by a two-yard touchdown pass to Paul Richardson after Trubisky was intercepted by Josh Norman; the Redskins failed the two-point conversion after both scores. Another Redskins drive reached the Bears' 16-yard line, where Keenum was hit by Trevathan on a quarterback sneak and fumbled, which was recovered by Bears Safety Eddie Jackson. With 1:50 remaining in the game, Piñeiro kicked a 38-yard field goal to increase the Bears lead to 31–15. Washington drove down into Chicago territory, but Keenum was sacked by Nick Williams on the final play of the game.

Gabriel, who exited the game after suffering a concussion, became the 35th player in NFL history to score three receiving touchdowns in the first half of a game and the third to do so on Monday Night Football joining Jerry Rice and Dwayne Allen. He was also the first Bears player to accomplish the feat in the Super Bowl era, and the fourth in team history to do so in one quarter after Red Pollock (1935), Frank Minini (1948) and Gale Sayers (1965).

==== Week 4: vs. Minnesota Vikings ====
Week Four: Minnesota Vikings at Chicago Bears – Game summary

Quarter	1	2	3	4	Total
Vikings	0	0	0	6	**6**
**Bears**	7	3	6	0	**16**

at Soldier Field, Chicago, Illinois

- Date: September 29
- Game time: 3:25 p.m. CDT
- Game weather: Cloudy, 67 °F (19 °C)
- Game attendance: 62,131
- Referee: Brad Allen
- TV announcers (CBS): Jim Nantz, Tony Romo and Tracy Wolfson
- Recap, Game Book

Game information

**First quarter**

- CHI – Tarik Cohen 10-yard pass from Chase Daniel (Eddy Piñeiro kick), 7:44. Bears 7–0. **Drive: 14 plays, 75 yards, 7:16.**

**Second quarter**

- CHI – Eddy Piñeiro 25-yard field goal, 0:00. Bears 10–0. **Drive: 16 plays, 72 yards, 6:36.**

**Third quarter**

- CHI – Eddy Piñeiro 38-yard field goal, 12:47. Bears 13–0. **Drive: 4 plays, −4 yards, 2:07.**
- CHI – Eddy Piñeiro 30-yard field goal, 3:04. Bears 16–0. **Drive: 9 plays, 67 yards, 4:59.**

**Fourth quarter**

- MIN – Dalvin Cook 2-yard run (pass failed), 2:58. Bears 16–6. **Drive: 13 plays, 92 yards, 4:08.**

**Top passers**

- MIN – Kirk Cousins – 27/36, 233 yards
- CHI – Chase Daniel – 22/30, 195 yards, TD

**Top rushers**

- MIN – Dalvin Cook – 14 rushes, 35 yards, TD
- CHI – David Montgomery – 21 rushes, 53 yards

**Top receivers**

- MIN – Stefon Diggs – 7 receptions, 108 yards
- CHI – Allen Robinson – 7 receptions, 77 yards

Wearing their throwback uniforms, the Bears hosted the 2–1 divisional opponent Minnesota Vikings in Week 4. With 116 total games between them, the Vikings led their rivalry 60–54–2, though the Bears won both meetings in 2018. In addition to players who were already sidelined like Nichols and Mike Davis (personal reasons), the Bears were plagued by various injuries to starters that forced them to miss the game, including Gabriel (concussion), Hicks (knee), lineman Kyle Long (hip) and linebacker Roquan Smith (personal). The day before the game, Sowell was cut yet again as Jonathan Harris was promoted from the practice squad. Working as team captains for the Bears were Patterson, Williams and DeAndre Houston-Carson.

On the Bears' opening drive, Trubisky was sacked by Danielle Hunter and injured his left shoulder, forcing backup quarterback Chase Daniel into action. Daniel led the offense on a 14-play, 75-yard drive that saw him complete four of five passes including a 10-yard touchdown to Cohen. The next two series ended with punts before Vikings receiver Stefon Diggs was stripped by Prince Amukamara and Clinton-Dix recovered the fumble; the play was initially ruled an incomplete pass before Nagy challenged and successfully overturned the call. The Bears capitalized on the turnover with Piñeiro's 25-yard field goal as time expired in the first half. On the first play of the second half, Vikings quarterback Kirk Cousins was sacked by Mack and fumbled, with Williams recovering the ball on Minnesota's 18-yard line. After three plays that resulted in a net loss of four yards, Piñeiro made a 38-yard kick. Piñeiro converted his third field goal three drives later, this time of 30 yards. Following four further punts, Dalvin Cook scored on a two-yard touchdown run with 2:58 remaining in the game, but Amukamara tackled Diggs' attempted screen pass on the two-point conversion. The Bears punted once again, but the Vikings turned the ball over on downs, enabling the Bears to run down the clock before their own turnover on downs with 24 seconds left. Cousins completed a six-yard pass to Bisi Johnson on the final play.

In relief duty, Daniel completed 22 of 30 passes for 195 yards with one touchdown and a 101.4 passer rating. Reserve linebacker Nick Kwiatkoski led the team in tackles with nine as the Bears defense held the Vikings' second-ranked rushing offense, which had averaged 193 yards in its first three games, to just 40 yards.

As of 2026, the Bears haven't defeating the Vikings at home since then.

==== Week 5: at Oakland Raiders ====
NFL London Games

Week Five: Chicago Bears at Oakland Raiders – Game summary

Quarter	1	2	3	4	Total
Bears	0	0	21	0	**21**
**Raiders**	0	17	0	7	**24**

at Tottenham Hotspur Stadium, London, England

- Date: October 6
- Game time: 6:00 p.m. BST/12:00 p.m. CDT
- Game weather: Cloudy, 59 °F (15 °C)
- Game attendance: 60,463
- Referee: Tony Corrente
- TV announcers (Fox): Dick Stockton, Mark Schlereth and Jennifer Hale
- Recap, Game Book

Game information

**First quarter**

- No scoring plays.

**Second quarter**

- OAK – Josh Jacobs 12-yard run (Daniel Carlson kick), 14:55. Raiders 7–0. **Drive: 10 plays, 90 yards, 5:06.**
- OAK – DeAndre Washington 3-yard run (Daniel Carlson kick), 9:51. Raiders 14–0. **Drive: 6 plays, 24 yards, 3:32.**
- OAK – Daniel Carlson 41-yard field goal, 1:56. Raiders 17–0. **Drive: 11 plays, 28 yards, 5:36.**

**Third quarter**

- CHI – David Montgomery 1-yard run (Eddy Piñeiro kick), 12:43. Raiders 17–7. **Drive: 2 plays, 14 yards, 0:36.**
- CHI – Allen Robinson 4-yard pass from Chase Daniel (Eddy Piñeiro kick), 3:56. Raiders 17–14. **Drive: 12 plays, 89 yards, 6:20.**
- CHI – Allen Robinson 16-yard pass from Chase Daniel (Eddy Piñeiro kick), 1:16. Bears 21–17. **Drive: 1 play, 16 yards, 0:25.**

**Fourth quarter**

- OAK – Josh Jacobs 2-yard run (Daniel Carlson kick), 1:57. Raiders 24–21. **Drive: 13 plays, 97 yards, 5:52.**

**Top passers**

- CHI – Chase Daniel – 22/30, 231 yards, 2 TD, 2 INT
- OAK – Derek Carr – 25/32, 229 yards

**Top rushers**

- CHI – David Montgomery – 11 rushes, 25 yards, TD
- OAK – Josh Jacobs – 26 rushes, 123 yards, 2 TD

**Top receivers**

- CHI – Allen Robinson – 7 receptions, 97 yards, 2 TD
- OAK – Foster Moreau – 4 receptions, 46 yards

Week 5 saw the Bears travel to London to play the 2–2 Oakland Raiders in the first NFL game at Tottenham Hotspur Stadium, which opened in April 2019. It was the Bears' first game in London since they defeated the Tampa Bay Buccaneers in 2011 and their third regular season game outside the United States (the first being a win over the Buffalo Bills in 2010 as part of the Bills Toronto Series); Chicago also played a preseason game against the Dallas Cowboys in London in 1986. The Bears and Raiders last met in 2015 with the former winning 22–20; the two teams split the all-time series with seven wins each. With Trubisky unavailable due to his shoulder injury, Tyler Bray was promoted from the practice squad and took Sowell's roster spot. Daniel, Mack and McManis were named team captains.

After a scoreless first quarter, the Raiders scored 17 unanswered points in the second. Josh Jacobs recorded a 12-yard touchdown run, which was followed by Daniel being intercepted by Nicholas Morrow, leading to a three-yard score by DeAndré Washington. Daniel Carlson added a 41-yard field goal later in the first half. Early in the third quarter, Derek Carr's pitch to Jacobs went wide and was recovered by Mack at the Raiders' 14-yard line; the Bears capitalized with Montgomery's one-yard touchdown run. Following a Raiders punt, Daniel led an 89-yard drive that ended with a four-yard touchdown throw to Robinson. When Chicago forced another Oakland fourth down, Cohen returned the ensuing punt a career-best 71 yards to set up Daniel's 16-yard touchdown to Robinson that gave the Bears the 21–17 lead. However, Anthony Miller was penalized for taunting, resulting in the following kickoff being moved back 15 yards; Trevor Davis returned the kickoff 52 yards to Chicago's 42, which was further pushed to their 37 when Miller received an offside penalty. Although Oakland reached the three-yard line, McManis punched the ball from Davis' hands and Amukamara recovered at the one. The Bears entered Raider territory before being forced to punt, pinning the Raiders at their three. On fourth down-and-six, punter A. J. Cole III was hit by Pierre-Louis for a roughing the kicker penalty, which moved the ball to a fourth-and-one; the Raiders successfully converted a fake punt with Erik Harris; Harris had initially fumbled with Buster Skrine recovering, but was ruled down. Oakland would complete a 97-yard drive with Jacobs' go-ahead two-yard touchdown run. With 1:57 remaining in the game, the Bears offense reached the Raiders' 47 before Daniel was intercepted by Gareon Conley; although the Raiders punted again with 21 seconds left, Daniel was sacked by Maurice Hurst Jr. on the final play of the game.

==== Week 6: Bye week ====
At the bye week, the Bears sat at 3–2 and facing the toughest schedule in the league as their remaining opponents had a combined winning percentage of .632. After the first five games, Chicago's offense was struggling mightily with just 17.4 points scored per game (ranked 28th in the league), 4.5 yards per play (30th), a passer rating of 86.3 (24th), 5.2 yards per attempt (30th), 80.6 rushing yards per game (26th) and 3.4 yards per rush (29th). The team as a whole also experienced troubles with penalties as they had 43 (23 by the defense), the sixth most in the NFL, for a seventh-ranked 360 yards; in 2018, the Bears were penalized 100 times for 848 yards, the fifth-lowest in the league. On defense, the Bears had 17 sacks—ranked the third-best pass rush by Football Outsiders—and the third-most turnovers forced with ten.

On October 9, with Trubisky's shoulder injury healing, Bray returned to the practice squad and Sowell was re-signed. In the week leading up to the Saints game, Long and Hicks were placed on injured reserve; Long's hip injury persisted after his return, while Hicks hurt his elbow against Oakland. To take their spots on the active roster, Anderson and Alex Bars were promoted from the practice squad, while Raymond and linebacker Fadol Brown were signed to the practice team.

==== Week 7: vs. New Orleans Saints ====
Week Seven: New Orleans Saints at Chicago Bears – Game summary

Quarter	1	2	3	4	Total
**Saints**	9	3	14	10	**36**
Bears	7	3	0	15	**25**

at Soldier Field, Chicago, Illinois

- Date: October 20
- Game time: 3:25 p.m. CDT
- Game weather: Partly cloudy, 54 °F (12 °C)
- Game attendance: 62,306
- Referee: Scott Novak
- TV announcers (Fox): Thom Brennaman, Troy Aikman and Erin Andrews
- Recap, Game Book

Game information

**First quarter**

- NO – Penalty on Pat O'Donnell enforced in end zone for a Safety, 13:29. Saints 2–0.
- NO – Josh Hill 7-yard pass from Teddy Bridgewater (Wil Lutz kick), 3:14. Saints 9–0. **Drive: 5 plays, 24 yards, 2:09.**
- CHI – Cordarrelle Patterson 102-yard kickoff return (Eddy Piñeiro kick), 2:59. Saints 9–7.

**Second quarter**

- CHI – Eddy Piñeiro 46-yard field goal, 11:33. Bears 10–9. **Drive: 11 plays, 39 yards, 4:48.**
- NO – Wil Lutz 39-yard field goal, 6:31. Saints 12–10. **Drive: 12 plays, 52 yards, 5:02.**

**Third quarter**

- NO – Latavius Murray 3-yard run (Wil Lutz kick), 12:00. Saints 19–10. **Drive: 6 plays, 75 yards, 3:00.**
- NO – Taysom Hill 4-yard pass from Teddy Bridgewater (Wil Lutz kick), 2:55. Saints 26–10. **Drive: 11 plays, 76 yards, 5:33.**

**Fourth quarter**

- NO – Wil Lutz 30-yard field goal, 12:45. Saints 29–10. **Drive: 9 plays, 38 yards, 3:59.**
- NO – Latavius Murray 4-yard run (Wil Lutz kick), 4:33. Saints 36–10. **Drive: 7 plays, 55 yards, 4:45.**
- CHI – Allen Robinson 7-yard pass from Mitchell Trubisky (Mitchell Trubisky-Adam Shaheen pass), 2:31. Saints 36–18. **Drive: 10 plays, 75 yards, 2:02.**
- CHI – Javon Wims 6-yard pass from Mitchell Trubisky (Eddy Piñeiro kick), 0:48. Saints 36–25. **Drive: 9 plays, 57 yards, 1:43.**

**Top passers**

- NO – Teddy Bridgewater – 23/38, 281 yards, 2 TD
- CHI – Mitchell Trubisky – 34/54, 251 yards, 2 TD

**Top rushers**

- NO – Latavius Murray – 27 rushes, 119 yards, 2 TD
- CHI – Tarik Cohen – 3 rushes, 10 yards

**Top receivers**

- NO – Michael Thomas – 9 receptions, 131 yards
- CHI – Allen Robinson – 10 receptions, 87 yards, TD

Chicago returned from the bye week by hosting the 5–1 New Orleans Saints. In 30 all-time games, the two were tied at 15 wins each, though the Bears trailed 13–15 in regular season meetings and had not defeated the Saints since 2008. Trubisky returned as the starter and wore a harness on his left shoulder, as did Nichols after missing the last three games and Larsen who missed the Oakland game with a knee injury. On the other side, the Saints were without starting quarterback Drew Brees, running back Alvin Kamara, and tight end Jared Cook due to injuries. Floyd, Kwiatkoski, and Cohen represented the Bears as captains.

The game started poorly for the Bears when J. T. Gray blocked O'Donnell's punt. O’Donnell made a heads-up play by pushing the ball out of the end zone for a safety to avoid a possible Saints touchdown. After three drives ended with a punt, Miller was stripped by Vonn Bell on a sweep, with Bell recovering at the Bears' 24-yard line. The Saints capitalized with Teddy Bridgewater's seven-yard touchdown to Josh Hill. The Bears responded with Patterson returning the ensuing kickoff 102 yards for a touchdown; Patterson also had a kick return touchdown the previous year in Chicago as a member of the New England Patriots, while he was the first Bears player to do so at Soldier Field since Devin Hester in 2011, and the first Bear in general since Chris Williams in 2014. In the second quarter, Piñeiro and New Orleans' Wil Lutz had 46- and 39-yard field goals but Piñeiro missed a 42-yard attempt wide right. The Saints led 12–10 at halftime. After receiving the 2nd half kickoff, New Orleans mounted a 75-yard drive that ended with Latavius Murray’s three-yard touchdown run; after Marcus Williams forced Montgomery to fumble on the Bears' first play of the half and A. J. Klein recovered, Lutz's 52-yard kick fell short. A Chicago punt led to a 78-yard drive by New Orleans in which Bridgewater threw a four-yard touchdown to Taysom Hill. Lutz kicked a 30-yard field goal early in the fourth quarter, and Murray added a four-yard TD run to put the Saints up 36–10. With 2:31 remaining in the game, Trubisky threw a seven-yard touchdown to Robinson and completed the two-point conversion to Adam Shaheen. Patterson recovered the following onside kick, which led to Javon Wims catching a four-yard touchdown from Trubisky with 48 seconds to go. With his team down 36–25, Ben Braunecker recovered the second onside kick but his foot had been out of bounds, negating the play. After two rushing plays by Murray and two Bears timeouts, Williams received a neutral zone infraction penalty that gave the Saints a first down. Bridgewater kneeled once to end the game.

The Bears' rushing attack, which was ranked 26th entering the game, had just 17 total yards on seven carries with two lost fumbles. The seven attempts were the lowest in team history, and Nagy's pass-heavy doctrine drew criticism from media considering Trubisky's recent injury. The Monday after the game, Nagy acknowledged the strategy but admitted the offense was "definitely searching right now" for an identity.

On Tuesday, Chicago released Harris and signed defensive lineman Brent Urban; Urban started every game in 2018 for the Baltimore Ravens and spent the early 2019 season with the Titans.

==== Week 8: vs. Los Angeles Chargers ====
Week Eight: Los Angeles Chargers at Chicago Bears – Game summary

Quarter	1	2	3	4	Total
**Chargers**	0	7	3	7	**17**
Bears	0	9	7	0	**16**

at Soldier Field, Chicago, Illinois

- Date: October 27
- Game time: 12:00 p.m. CDT
- Game weather: Clear, 52 °F (11 °C)
- Game attendance: 61,632
- Referee: Brad Rogers
- TV announcers (Fox): Thom Brennaman, Chris Spielman and Shannon Spake
- Recap, Game Book

Game information

**First quarter**

- No scoring plays.

**Second quarter**

- CHI – Eddy Piñeiro 22-yard field goal, 14:45. Bears 3–0. **Drive: 4 plays, 0 yards, 0:52.**
- CHI – Eddy Piñeiro 25-yard field goal, 4:16. Bears 6–0. **Drive: 9 plays, 64 yards, 4:29.**
- LAC – Melvin Gordon 19-yard run (Chase McLaughlin kick), 2:12. Chargers 7–6. **Drive: 4 plays, 75 yards, 2:04.**
- CHI – Eddy Piñeiro 19-yard field goal, 0:00. Bears 9–7. **Drive: 11 plays, 76 yards, 2:12.**

**Third quarter**

- CHI – David Montgomery 4-yard run (Eddy Piñeiro kick), 8:08. Bears 16–7. **Drive: 11 plays, 75 yards, 6:52.**
- LAC – Chase McLaughlin 20-yard field goal, 0:39. Bears 16–10. **Drive: 14 plays, 73 yards, 7:29.**

**Fourth quarter**

- LAC – Austin Ekeler 11-yard pass from Philip Rivers (Chase McLaughlin kick), 8:04. Chargers 17–16. **Drive: 3 plays, 26 yards, 1:21.**

**Top passers**

- LAC – Philip Rivers – 19/29, 201 yards, TD, INT
- CHI – Mitchell Trubisky – 23/35, 253 yards, INT

**Top rushers**

- LAC – Melvin Gordon – 8 rushes, 31 yards, TD
- CHI – David Montgomery – 27 rushes, 135 yards, TD

**Top receivers**

- LAC – Mike Williams – 3 receptions, 69 yards
- CHI – Anthony Miller – 3 receptions, 67 yards

Wearing their orange jerseys, the Bears hosted the 2–5 Los Angeles Chargers. In twelve all-time games, the Bears led 7–5, including winning the last two games. Robinson, Trevathan, and Houston-Carson were team captains.

Three straight punts preceded Piñeiro's 33-yard field goal hitting the right upright. On the Chargers' ensuing drive, Fuller intercepted Philip Rivers and returned it to the Chargers' four-yard line, but the offense struggled to gain a yard, leading to Piñeiro making a 27-yard kick. Chicago reached Los Angeles' nine-yard line but only reached their seven; Piñeiro kicked a 25-yard field goal. The Chargers answered with a four-play, 75-yard drive that ended with Melvin Gordon's four-yard touchdown run. Down by one, the Bears reached the Chargers' five-yard line with help from Montgomery's 55-yard run, but further red zone woes persisted, leading to Piñeiro giving his team the 9–7 lead on a 19-yard kick. To start the second half, the Bears mounted an 11-play, 75-yard series that included eight rushes as Montgomery recorded a four-yard score. Chase McLaughlin made a 20-yard field goal to end the third quarter. Early in the final period, Trubisky was intercepted by Casey Hayward, but McLaughlin's 42-yard kick was wide right; the Chargers regained possession on the next series after Trubisky lost a fumble on his 26-yard line. The takeaway led to Rivers' go-ahead score to Austin Ekeler. After two drives ending with punts, the Bears got the ball back on their 35 with 1:33 remaining in the game. Although Trubisky led the Bears to the Chargers' 21, Nagy called to kneel to run down the clock and set up Piñeiro's potential game-winning 41-yard kick. The kick went wide left as time expired, marking the Bears' first three-game losing streak under Nagy.

Although the Bears offense improved statistically by outgaining the Chargers in total yards (388 to 221), first downs (26 to 11), and time of possession (38 minutes to 22), the offense recorded a combined three yards on ten plays inside the ten-yard line. Nagy's decision to let Trubisky kneel before the final kick was criticized; in his post-game conference, Nagy explained he had "zero thought of running the ball and taking the chance of fumbling the football."

The Tuesday after the game, Brown was placed on practice squad injured reserve and Vaughters took his spot.

==== Week 9: at Philadelphia Eagles ====
Week Nine: Chicago Bears at Philadelphia Eagles – Game summary

Quarter	1	2	3	4	Total
Bears	0	0	7	7	**14**
**Eagles**	3	9	7	3	**22**

at Lincoln Financial Field, Philadelphia, Pennsylvania

- Date: November 3
- Game time: 1:00 p.m. EST/12:00 p.m. CST
- Game weather: Sunny, 52 °F (11 °C)
- Game attendance: 69,796
- Referee: Craig Wrolstad
- TV announcers (Fox): Dick Stockton, Mark Schlereth and Jennifer Hale
- Recap, Game Book

Game information

**First quarter**

- PHI – Jake Elliott 28-yard field goal, 6:45. Eagles 3–0. **Drive: 12 plays, 70 yards, 6:33.**

**Second quarter**

- PHI – Jake Elliott 28-yard field goal, 13:22. Eagles 6–0. **Drive: 12 plays, 61 yards, 7:16.**
- PHI – Zach Ertz 25-yard pass from Carson Wentz (kick failed), 6:21. Eagles 12–0. **Drive: 7 plays, 62 yards, 3:58.**

**Third quarter**

- PHI – Jordan Howard 13-yard run (Jake Elliott kick), 10:37. Eagles 19–0. **Drive: 8 plays, 84 yards, 4:23.**
- CHI – David Montgomery 1-yard run (Eddy Pineiro kick), 6:29. Eagles 19–7. **Drive: 7 plays, 75 yards, 4:08.**

**Fourth quarter**

- CHI – David Montgomery 1-yard run (Eddy Pineiro kick), 12:43. Eagles 19–14. **Drive: 8 plays, 58 yards, 3:21.**
- PHI – Jake Elliott 38-yard field goal, 0:25. Eagles 22–14. **Drive: 16 plays, 69 yards, 8:14.**

**Top passers**

- CHI – Mitch Trubisky – 10/21, 125 yards
- PHI – Carson Wentz – 26/39, 239 yards, TD

**Top rushers**

- CHI – David Montgomery – 14 rushes, 40 yards, 2 TD
- PHI – Jordan Howard – 19 rushes, 82 yards, TD

**Top receivers**

- CHI – Taylor Gabriel – 3 receptions, 69 yards
- PHI – Zach Ertz – 9 receptions, 103 yards, TD

The Bears visited the Philadelphia Eagles, who defeated them in 2018's Wild Card Game, in Week 9. In 46 total games since their first meeting in 1933, the Bears led 30–15–1. With outside linebacker Isaiah Irving out after suffering a quad injury against the Chargers, Vaughters was promoted to the active roster the day before the game, where he took Sowell's place. Burton, a former Eagle, was named a team captain alongside Nichols and Braunecker.

The Eagles scored points on their first three drives via two Jake Elliott field goals and Carson Wentz's 25-yard touchdown to Zach Ertz (though Elliott missed the extra point). On the other hand, Chicago's offense struggled mightily through the first half with every series ending in a punt; the Bears ended the half with just nine total yards and failed to record a first down until there were 48 seconds remaining. After former Bear Jordan Howard scored on Philadelphia's opening second-half series with a 13-yard run, Chicago rebounded as Trubisky threw a 53-yard pass to Gabriel to set up Montgomery's one-yard touchdown run. Following an exchange of punts, Montgomery scored again on another one-yard touchdown. However, the Eagles mounted a 16-play, 69-yard drive that saw them convert on third down four times, leading to Elliott's 38-yard kick with 25 seconds remaining. Elliott attempted a squib kick on the ensuing kickoff, which Shaheen muffed to secure the Bears' fourth-consecutive loss.

==== Week 10: vs. Detroit Lions ====
Week Ten: Detroit Lions at Chicago Bears – Game summary

Quarter	1	2	3	4	Total
Lions	3	3	0	7	**13**
**Bears**	0	7	13	0	**20**

at Soldier Field, Chicago, Illinois

- Date: November 10
- Game time: 12:00 p.m. CST
- Game weather: Overcast, 40 °F (4 °C)
- Game attendance: 61,758
- Referee: Carl Cheffers
- TV announcers (CBS): Ian Eagle, Dan Fouts and Evan Washburn
- Recap, Game Book

Game information

**First quarter**

- DET – Matt Prater 22-yard field goal, 8:42. Lions 3–0. **Drive: 13 plays, 72 yards, 6:18.**

**Second quarter**

- DET – Matt Prater 54-yard field goal, 4:40. Lions 6–0. **Drive: 7 plays, 13 yards, 2:54.**
- CHI – Ben Braunecker 18-yard pass from Mitchell Trubisky (Eddy Piñeiro kick), 0:25. Bears 7–6. **Drive: 10 plays, 80 yards, 4:15.**

**Third quarter**

- CHI – Tarik Cohen 9-yard pass from Mitchell Trubisky (kick failed, wide right), 12:25. Bears 13–6. **Drive: 5 plays, 76 yards, 2:35.**
- CHI – Taylor Gabriel 24-yard pass from Mitchell Trubisky (Eddy Piñeiro kick), 9:38. Bears 20–6. **Drive: 3 plays, 25 yards, 1:20.**

**Fourth quarter**

- DET – Kenny Golladay 47-yard pass from Jeff Driskel (Matt Prater kick), 5:53. Bears 20–13. **Drive: 4 plays, 81 yards, 1:23.**

**Top passers**

- DET – Jeff Driskel – 27/46, 269 yards, TD, INT
- CHI – Mitchell Trubisky – 16/23, 173 yards, 3 TD

**Top rushers**

- DET – Jeff Driskel – 5 rushes, 37 yards
- CHI – David Montgomery – 17 rushes, 60 yards

**Top receivers**

- DET – Marvin Jones – 5 receptions, 77 yards
- CHI – Allen Robinson – 6 receptions, 86 yards

Week 10 saw a battle of divisional rivals as the Bears hosted the 3–4–1 Detroit Lions. Although Chicago led the rivalry 99–74–5 and swept Detroit in 2018, the Lions had won all but one game between 2013 and 2017. The Saturday before the game, Vaughters took Sowell's roster spot again, while Mike Davis was released and Ryan Nall was promoted from the practice squad; the decision to waive Davis, who had 11 carries for 25 yards as a Bear and never played more than 15 snaps per game since the season opener, was primarily an effort by the Bears to gain a fourth-round compensatory pick for the 2020 NFL draft. Amukamara, Robinson, and Joel Iyiegbuniwe were the Bears' captains.

The Bears kicked off to start the game. The Lions offense lost starting quarterback Matthew Stafford due to a back injury, leading them to start backup Jeff Driskel. In his first drive, Driskel led Detroit to Chicago's four-yard line before having to settle for Matt Prater's 22-yard field goal. After seven consecutive drives ending with punts, Prater kicked a 54-yard field goal to put Detroit up 6–0 with 4:40 remaining in the first half. The Bears responded with an 80-yard drive that concluded with Trubisky's 18-yard touchdown to Braunecker, Chicago's first first-half touchdown since the Vikings game; it was Braunecker's first career touchdown as Trubisky completed all but one pass for 66 yards. Trubisky opened the second half with a nine-yard touchdown to Cohen to complete a 76-yard series, though Piñeiro missed the extra point. On Detroit's ensuing series, Driskel was intercepted by Kwiatkoski—who entered the game after Trevathan suffered a serious elbow injury while trying to tackle Driskel in the first quarter—to set up Trubisky's third touchdown throw of the game, a 24-yard pass to Gabriel. Three punts by each team eventually led to Driskel throwing a 47-yard touchdown pass to Kenny Golladay with 5:33 left in the game. The Bears punted again with 1:10 remaining, and although Detroit reached Chicago's 25-yard line, Driskel's Hail Mary pass to Marvin Jones fell incomplete and he received a penalty for throwing after crossing the line of scrimmage.

As the Bears improved to 4–5 and snapped their four-game losing streak, the victory helped them pass the Lions for third in the division.

==== Week 11: at Los Angeles Rams ====
Week Eleven: Chicago Bears at Los Angeles Rams – Game summary

Quarter	1	2	3	4	Total
Bears	0	0	7	0	**7**
**Rams**	0	10	0	7	**17**

at Los Angeles Memorial Coliseum, Los Angeles, California

- Date: November 17
- Game time: 7:20 p.m. CST/5:20 p.m. PST
- Game weather: Clear, 79 °F (26 °C)
- Game attendance: 70,758
- Referee: John Hussey
- TV announcers (NBC): Al Michaels, Cris Collinsworth and Michele Tafoya
- Recap, Game Book

Game information

**First quarter**

- No scoring plays

**Second quarter**

- LAR – Greg Zuerlein 38-yard field goal, 11:31. Rams 3–0. **Drive: 8 plays, 43 yards, 4:26.**
- LAR – Todd Gurley 1-yard run (Greg Zuerlein kick), 3:28. Rams 10–0. **Drive: 4 plays, 56 yards, 1:55.**

**Third quarter**

- CHI – Tarik Cohen 14-yard pass from Mitch Trubisky (Eddy Pineiro kick), 7:10. Rams 10–7. **Drive: 12 plays, 80 yards, 5:51.**

**Fourth quarter**

- LAR – Malcolm Brown 5-yard run (Greg Zuerlein kick), 3:31. Rams 17–7. **Drive: 8 plays, 71 yards, 4:11.**

**Top passers**

- CHI – Mitch Trubisky – 24/43, 190 yards, TD, INT
- LAR – Jared Goff – 11/18, 173 yards, INT

**Top rushers**

- CHI – Tarik Cohen – 9 rushes, 39 yards
- LAR – Todd Gurley – 25 rushes, 97 yards, TD

**Top receivers**

- CHI – Taylor Gabriel – 7 receptions, 57 yards
- LAR – Josh Reynolds – 3 receptions, 55 yards

On Sunday Night Football, Chicago visited Los Angeles to play the 5–4 Los Angeles Rams, whom the Bears beat 15–6 in 2018. In 93 all-time games, the Bears held the advantage 54–36–3. Over the week, Vaughters rotated between the practice squad and active roster before being on the latter for the game when Burton was placed on injured reserve. Burton, who continued to struggle with the groin injury, ended his season with 14 receptions for 84 yards. The Bears also added offensive lineman Dino Boyd, who recently spent time with the Cincinnati Bengals practice squad, to their own unit. Lucas, Skrine, and Pierre-Louis represented Chicago as team captains.

Despite early defensive success as the Bears forced two Rams turnovers via Clinton-Dix recovering Todd Gurley's fumble and Smith intercepting Jared Goff, Piñeiro missed 48- and 47-yard field goals and the offense turned the ball over on downs. Greg Zuerlein made a 38-yard field goal early in the second quarter. After two punts, Trubisky's pass for Miller bounced off his hands and was intercepted by Troy Hill, which led to a 50-yard pass from Goff to Cooper Kupp that set up Gurley's one-yard touchdown run. Although the Bears recorded 151 yards, they were shut out in the first half for the third time in 2019. After the Rams punted to start the second half, the Bears recorded a 12-play, 80-yard drive in which Trubisky completed seven of nine passes for 66 yards and a 14-yard touchdown to Cohen. Neither team was able to score on their next four drives apiece before the Rams had a 70-yard drive, which included a 51-yard touchdown pass to Josh Reynolds that was nullified by an illegal formation penalty, that ended with Malcolm Brown's four-yard touchdown run. With less than four minutes remaining, Daniel replaced Trubisky due to a hip injury; he was sacked twice and completed just one of three passes before the drive concluded with a turnover on downs. Trubisky's injury was later diagnosed as a hip pointer he had suffered while being sacked by Michael Brockers late in the second quarter.

With the offense and particularly the tight ends continuing to struggle, Vaughters was cut and Jesper Horsted was promoted to the active roster; Horsted's 121 receiving yards in the preseason were more than those of any Bears tight end during the regular season. Running back Jeremy McNichols, who bounced between various NFL teams since his career began in 2017, and outside linebacker Dewayne Hendrix, who spent the 2019 offseason as an undrafted rookie with the Miami Dolphins, were added to the practice squad. Vaughters was back on the practice squad on November 20.

==== Week 12: vs. New York Giants ====
Week Twelve: New York Giants at Chicago Bears – Game summary

Quarter	1	2	3	4	Total
Giants	0	7	0	7	**14**
**Bears**	0	3	16	0	**19**

at Soldier Field, Chicago, Illinois

- Date: November 24
- Game time: 12:00 p.m. CST
- Game weather: Mostly sunny, 48 °F (9 °C)
- Game attendance: 61,581
- Referee: Shawn Hochuli
- TV announcers (Fox): Thom Brennaman, Chris Spielman and Shannon Spake
- Recap, Game Book

Game information

**First quarter**

- No scoring plays.

**Second quarter**

- NYG – Kaden Smith 3-yard pass from Daniel Jones (Aldrick Rosas kick), 7:38. Giants 7–0. **Drive: 6 plays, 42 yards, 3:24.**
- CHI – Eddy Pineiro 26-yard field goal, 0:08. Giants 7–3. **Drive: 9 plays, 59 yards, 1:47.**

**Third quarter**

- CHI – Allen Robinson 32-yard pass from Mitch Trubisky (Eddy Pineiro kick), 12:12. Bears 10–7. **Drive: 5 plays, 60 yards, 2:48.**
- CHI – Eddy Pineiro 24-yard field goal, 7:09. Bears 13–7. **Drive: 8 plays, 88 yards, 2:38.**
- CHI – Mitch Trubisky 2-yard run (kick failed), 5:19. Bears 19–7. **Drive: 3 plays, 3 yards, 1:35.**

**Fourth quarter**

- NYG – Golden Tate 23-yard pass from Daniel Jones (Aldrick Rosas kick), 4:10. Bears 19–14. **Drive: 11 plays, 97 yards, 4:55.**

**Top passers**

- NYG – Daniel Jones – 21/36, 150 yards, 2 TD
- CHI – Mitch Trubisky – 25/41, 278 yards, TD, 2 INT

**Top rushers**

- NYG – Saquon Barkley – 17 rushes, 59 yards
- CHI – Tarik Cohen – 6 rushes, 25 yards

**Top receivers**

- NYG – Darius Slayton – 4 receptions, 67 yards
- CHI – Allen Robinson – 6 receptions, 131 yards, TD

Wearing their 1960s throwback helmets, the Bears hosted the 2–8 Giants. Although the Bears won the latest meeting between the two in Chicago in 2013, they had lost the last two games, including a 30–27 defeat in 2018. In 59 total games, the Bears held a 33–24–2 advantage. Clinton-Dix, Leno, and O'Donnell were team captains.

The game began poorly for the Bears when Piñeiro's kickoff went out of bounds, though the Giants had to punt. Chicago's offensive troubles continued as their first drive ended with another punt. On their next series, the Bears traveled 77 yards and into the Giants' red zone, where Braunecker dropped a potential 29-yard touchdown pass before Trubisky was intercepted by Alec Ogletree in the end zone. Although the Giants punted again, the Bears did the same after a 60-yard completion to Robinson was nullified by center Cody Whitehair receiving a hands-to-the-face penalty. Midway through the second quarter, Kaden Smith caught a three-yard touchdown pass from Daniel Jones to give the Giants the lead. Despite further poor offensive performances by the Bears, one of which led to O'Donnell's 13-yard punt, New York's Aldrick Rosas missed field goals of 42 and 43 yards. With 1:55 left in the first half, the Bears drove 59 yards to set up Piñeiro's 26-yard field goal. Chicago opened the second half with their first touchdown since Week 10 as Trubisky threw a 23-yard touchdown to Robinson. After the Giants punted to pin the Bears on their six-yard line, Trubisky and the offense went on an 88-yard drive that ended with Piñeiro converting a 24-yard kick. On New York's next play, Jones was strip-sacked by Mack and Williams recovered, leading to Trubisky's two-yard touchdown run. Up 19–7, Chicago successfully scored on the two-point conversion with Trubisky's throw to Gabriel, but Robinson was penalized for offensive pass interference after colliding with Deone Bucannon. Instead, the Bears opted to kick the extra point. Massie, who normally worked with the kicking unit, hurt his ankle and forced Urban to take his spot, but his teammates—unaware of the injury and his replacement—assumed they were missing a player. As a result, Chicago suffered a too-many-men penalty that forced Piñeiro to make a 48-yard extra point; he missed the kick wide left. Following another Giant punt, Trubisky was intercepted by Julian Love to start the fourth quarter, though the Bears defense forced a turnover on downs. With 4:10 remaining in the game, Jones threw a 23-yard touchdown to Golden Tate on fourth down; although Chicago punted again, Jones' fourth-down pass to Darius Slayton was incomplete. Trubisky kneeled thrice to clinch the 19–14 victory.

==== Week 13: at Detroit Lions ====
Thanksgiving Day Games

Week Thirteen: Chicago Bears at Detroit Lions – Game summary

Quarter	1	2	3	4	Total
**Bears**	7	3	7	7	**24**
Lions	14	3	0	3	**20**

at Ford Field, Detroit, Michigan

- Date: November 28
- Game time: 12:30 p.m. EST/11:30 a.m. CST
- Game weather: None (indoor stadium)
- Game attendance: 65,412
- Referee: Jerome Boger
- TV announcers (Fox): Joe Buck, Troy Aikman, Erin Andrews and Kristina Pink
- Recap, Game Book

Game information

**First quarter**

- CHI – Allen Robinson 10-yard pass from Mitchell Trubisky (Eddy Piñeiro kick), 11:37. Bears 7–0. **Drive: 6 plays, 50 yards, 3:23.**
- DET – Kenny Golladay 75-yard pass from David Blough (Matt Prater kick), 11:01. Tied 7–7. **Drive: 3 plays, 75 yards, 0:36.**
- DET – Marvin Jones 8-yard pass from David Blough (Matt Prater kick), 4:12. Lions 14–7. **Drive: 10 plays, 78 yards, 5:14.**

**Second quarter**

- DET – Matt Prater 25 yard field goal, 3:10. Lions 17–7. **Drive: 11 plays, 61 yards, 4:59.**
- CHI – Eddy Piñeiro 30 Yd Field Goal, 0:22. Lions 17–10. **Drive: 9 plays, 52 yards, 2:48.**

**Third quarter**

- CHI – Jesper Horsted 18-yard pass from Mitchell Trubisky (Eddy Piñeiro kick), 4:44. Tied 17–17. **Drive: 9 plays, 80 yards, 4:34.**

**Fourth quarter**

- DET – Matt Prater 24 yard field goal, 10:47. Lions 20–17. **Drive: 15 plays, 70 yards, 8:57.**
- CHI – David Montgomery 3-yard pass from Mitchell Trubisky (Eddy Piñeiro kick), 2:17. Bears 24–20. **Drive: 9 plays, 90 yards, 4:23.**

**Top passers**

- CHI – Mitchell Trubisky – 29/38, 338 yards, 3 TD, INT
- DET – David Blough – 22/38, 280 yards, 2 TD, INT

**Top rushers**

- CHI – David Montgomery – 16 rushes, 75 yards
- DET – Bo Scarbrough – 21 rushes, 83 yards

**Top receivers**

- CHI – Anthony Miller – 9 receptions, 140 yards
- DET – Kenny Golladay – 4 receptions, 158 yards, TD

The Bears' second game against the 3–8–1 Lions came in Week 13 in Detroit on Thanksgiving Day; the Bears were 18–15–2 in games held on the holiday, including beating the Lions 23–16 in 2018. Robinson, Fuller, and Patterson served as Chicago's team captains.

On the opening kickoff, Justin Coleman was given an unnecessary roughness penalty while tackling Patterson, forcing a re-kick that Patterson returned 57 yards to midfield. From there, Trubisky completed all four passes for 31 yards and a 12-yard touchdown to Robinson for Chicago's first opening-drive touchdown since Week 4. With Stafford and Driskel both out, third-string quarterback David Blough—who had no NFL regular season experience—assumed starting duties for the Lions, and threw a 75-yard touchdown to Golladay on his team's third offensive play after Amukamara relinquished his coverage to a safety who was not present. The score was the first opening-drive touchdown allowed by the Bears since Week 7 of 2018, ending an NFL-best 21-game streak. After the Bears punted, Blough threw a second touchdown pass, this time a nine-yard throw to Jones; the Lions got the ball back when Prater successfully executed a surprise onside kick, though they were eventually forced to punt. In the second quarter, the Bears had a 59-yard drive that was marred by penalties to result in a first-and-32; it subsequently ended with a turnover on downs, which led to Prater's 25-yard field goal to put Detroit up by ten points. With 3:10 remaining in the first half, Trubisky led a 59-yard series to set up a 30-yard kick by Piñeiro. The Lions punted to start the second half, and although the Bears reached the opposing 33-yard line, Trubisky's pass for Robinson was intercepted by Darius Slay. Chicago rebounded from the turnover with an 80-yard possession that resulted in Trubisky's 18-yard touchdown to Horsted. Detroit drove as far as Chicago's five-yard line on the ensuing series, where Fuller stopped J. D. McKissic's near-touchdown and the Lions had to settle for Prater's 24-yard kick. Following an exchange of punts, Trubisky guided the Bears offense on a 90-yard drive, during which he completed 32- and 34-yard passes to Miller on third down, en route to a three-yard touchdown pass to Montgomery that gave the Bears the lead with 2:17 left. Blough's final drive ended with a fourth-down interception by Jackson to seal the 24–20 win.

The Saturday after the game, Shaheen (foot) and McManis (groin) were placed on injured reserve, with offensive lineman Corey Levin and tight end Eric Saubert being signed in their places. Levin, who played in 16 games as a rookie for the 2018 Tennessee Titans, was poached from the Broncos' practice squad, while Saubert, who started a game for the 2017 Atlanta Falcons, was signed off Oakland's practice squad.

==== Week 14: vs. Dallas Cowboys ====
Week Fourteen: Dallas Cowboys at Chicago Bears – Game summary

Quarter	1	2	3	4	Total
Cowboys	7	0	0	17	**24**
**Bears**	0	17	7	7	**31**

at Soldier Field, Chicago, Illinois

- Date: December 5
- Game time: 7:20 p.m. CST
- Game weather: Mostly cloudy, 44 °F (7 °C)
- Game attendance: 61,276
- Referee: Brad Rogers
- TV announcers (Fox/NFLN/Amazon Prime): Joe Buck, Troy Aikman, Erin Andrews and Kristina Pink
- Recap, Game Book

Game information

**First quarter**

- DAL – Ezekiel Elliott 2-yard run (Brett Maher kick), 6:03. Cowboys 7–0. **Drive: 17 plays, 75 yards, 8:57.**

**Second quarter**

- CHI – Allen Robinson 5-yard pass from Mitchell Trubisky (Eddy Piñeiro kick), 12:13. Tied 7–7. **Drive: 6 plays, 51 yards, 3:04.**
- CHI – Eddy Piñeiro 36-yard field goal, 8:06. Bears 10–7. **Drive: 7 plays, 36 yards, 3:09.**
- CHI – Allen Robinson 8-yard pass from Mitchell Trubisky (Eddy Piñeiro kick), 0:10. Bears 17–7. **Drive: 14 plays, 68 yards, 4:50.**

**Third quarter**

- CHI – Anthony Miller 14-yard pass from Mitchell Trubisky (Eddy Piñeiro kick), 3:18. Bears 24–7. **Drive: 11 plays, 84 yards, 6:42.**

**Fourth quarter**

- DAL – Ezekiel Elliott 2-yard run (Brett Maher kick), 14:55. Bears 24–14. **Drive: 9 plays, 54 yards, 3:03.**
- CHI – Mitchell Trubisky 23-yard run (Eddy Piñeiro kick), 13:22. Bears 31–14. **Drive: 3 plays, 60 yards, 1:33.**
- DAL – Amari Cooper 19-yard pass from Dak Prescott (Brett Maher kick), 4:29. Bears 31–21. **Drive: 10 plays, 85 yards, 3:14.**
- DAL – Brett Maher 31-yard field goal, 0:08. Bears 31–24. **Drive: 9 plays, 77 yards, 1:42.**

**Top passers**

- DAL – Dak Prescott – 27/49, 334 yards, TD
- CHI – Mitchell Trubisky – 23/31, 244 yards, 3 TD, INT

**Top rushers**

- DAL – Ezekiel Elliott – 19 rushes, 81 yards, 2 TD
- CHI – David Montgomery – 20 rushes, 86 yards

**Top receivers**

- DAL – Michael Gallup – 6 receptions, 109 yards
- CHI – Tarik Cohen – 6 receptions, 24 yards

Week 14 saw a battle of 6–6 teams as the Bears hosted the Dallas Cowboys on Thursday Night Football. Chicago had not beaten Dallas since 2013, losing their last two meetings, and the latter also led the all-time series 15–11. Amukamara was out with a hamstring injury, forcing Kevin Toliver—who had played just three snaps on defense in 2019—into action at starting cornerback. Miller, Smith, and Bush were Chicago's team captains.

The Bears defense allowed an opening-drive touchdown for the second straight week as the Cowboys marched 75 yards on 17 plays for Ezekiel Elliott's two-yard touchdown run; the drive lasted 8:57, the longest to start a game in the NFL in 2019. Chicago's offense attempted to respond before Trubisky was intercepted by Jourdan Lewis at Dallas' one-yard line. In the second quarter, the Bears scored 17 unanswered points with Trubisky's five-yard touchdown to Robinson, Piñeiro's 36-yard field goal, and a second Trubisky touchdown pass to Robinson for eight yards. The Cowboys' four drives in the quarter ended with two punts, Brett Maher missing a 42-yard kick wide right, and Dak Prescott kneeling to take the game to halftime. Trubisky recorded his third touchdown throw of the day to start the second half with a 14-yard pass to Miller. The next three drives of the game resulted in punts before Montgomery was stripped by Joe Thomas and Jaylon Smith recovered; the Cowboys capitalized on the takeaway with Elliott's two-yard score to start the fourth quarter. The Bears retaliated with a read option play by Trubisky, running for a 23-yard touchdown. Dallas scored ten more points in the game with Prescott's 19-yard touchdown to Amari Cooper and Maher's 31-yard kick. With eight seconds left, Miller recovered Maher's onside kick to secure Chicago's third consecutive victory.

During the game's opening drive, Smith suffered a season-ending pectoral injury, leading to him being placed on injured reserve on December 9. To take his place, the Bears signed linebacker Devante Bond, a former Buccaneer who played four games for Tampa Bay in 2019 but was suspended early in the season for violating the NFL's performance-enhancing drugs policy. Chicago also released Hendrix from the practice and signed defensive back Xavier Crawford to the group. Another practice squad transaction took place two days later with wide receiver Reggie Davis being signed and McNichols being waived.

==== Week 15: at Green Bay Packers ====
Week Fifteen: Chicago Bears at Green Bay Packers – Game summary

Quarter	1	2	3	4	Total
Bears	0	3	0	10	**13**
**Packers**	7	0	14	0	**21**

at Lambeau Field, Green Bay, Wisconsin

- Date: December 15
- Game time: 12:00 p.m. CST
- Game weather: Sunny, 11 °F (−12 °C)
- Game attendance: 78,266
- Referee: Scott Novak
- TV announcers (Fox): Kevin Burkhardt, Charles Davis and Pam Oliver
- Recap, Game Book

Game information

**First quarter**

- GB – Davante Adams 29-yard pass from Aaron Rodgers (Mason Crosby kick), 4:47. Packers 7–0. **Drive: 4 plays, 35 yards, 2:08.**

**Second quarter**

- CHI – Eddy Piñeiro 30-yard field goal, 1:45. Packers 7–3. **Drive: 8 plays, 52 yards, 3:18.**

**Third quarter**

- GB – Aaron Jones 21-yard run (Mason Crosby kick), 12:44. Packers 14–3. **Drive: 5 plays, 73 yards, 2:16.**
- GB – Aaron Jones 2-yard run (Mason Crosby kick), 7:48. Packers 21–3. **Drive: 5 plays, 66 yards, 1:57.**

**Fourth quarter**

- CHI – Eddy Piñeiro 27-yard field goal, 14:56. Packers 21–6. **Drive: 11 plays, 75 yards, 3:37.**
- CHI – Anthony Miller 2-yard pass from Mitchell Trubisky (Eddy Piñeiro kick), 8:09. Packers 21–13. **Drive: 13 plays, 67 yards, 5:03.**

**Top passers**

- CHI – Mitchell Trubisky – 29/53, 334 yards, TD, 2 INT
- GB – Aaron Rodgers – 16/33, 203 yards, TD

**Top rushers**

- CHI – David Montgomery – 14 rushes, 39 yards
- GB – Aaron Jones – 13 rushes, 51 yards, 2 TD

**Top receivers**

- CHI – Anthony Miller – 9 receptions, 118 yards, TD
- GB – Davante Adams – 7 receptions, 103 yards, TD

The Bears' second game against the Packers took place at Lambeau Field; their last game in Green Bay was a 24–23 defeat in Week 1 of 2018. The day before the game, Hicks was activated from injured reserve, while Braunecker was placed on IR with a concussion. Clinton-Dix, James Daniels, and Patrick Scales served as the Bears' captains.

Neither team scored on their first drives as they punted. On his team's next punt that reached midfield, Patterson tackled returner Tyler Ervin, who did not signal for a fair catch, and forced a fumble that the Bears recovered, but he was controversially penalized for kick catch interference; Fox rules analyst Dean Blandino pointed out the NFL's rule on kick catch interference disagreed with the penalty as Ervin had caught the ball before being hit. Regardless, the penalty meant the Packers started their drive on the Bears' 35-yard line, and they eventually scored first on Rodgers' 29-yard touchdown to Davante Adams on fourth down. Chicago's offense continued to struggle, including a drive that ended with a turnover on downs in Green Bay territory. With 1:45 left in the first half, Piñeiro made a 30-yard field goal. However, the Packers scored touchdowns on their first two series of the second half with Aaron Jones' 21- and two-yard rushing scores. Meanwhile, the Bears' first second-half series ended with another turnover on downs, this time at the Packers' 34-yard line. Down 21–3, the Bears defense held their ground by forcing the Packers to punt on every drive for the rest of the game. Piñeiro converted a 27-yard kick to start the fourth quarter, followed by Trubisky's two-yard touchdown pass to Miller. Despite scoring ten unanswered points, further offensive errors included Trubisky being intercepted by defensive lineman Dean Lowry and another turnover on downs with 1:41 left. After the defense forced a punt with 44 seconds left, the Chicago offense attempted a final rally. With one second remaining and the Bears on the Packers' 34-yard line, the offense's last play consisted of multiple laterals, a play that Trubisky remarked was "kind of ad-libbed": after Trubisky threw a pass to Cohen, Cohen lateraled back to Trubisky at the 21; Trubisky ran for five yards and escaped potential tackler Kyler Fackrell before pitching to Horsted; although Robinson was available as a lateral option, Horsted was tackled by Chandon Sullivan and fumbled, with Williams recovering at the two.

Later in the day, the Vikings defeated the Chargers 39–10 to improve to 10–4, enabling them to either win the NFC North or clinch one of the two wild card spots. As the Bears could only win nine games at most and either of the 11-win San Francisco 49ers and Seattle Seahawks would secure the second wild card, Chicago was mathematically eliminated from playoff contention.

The Wednesday after the game, Trevathan was placed on injured reserve, with Michael Joseph being promoted from the practice squad. To take Joseph's spot on the practice squad, the team signed wide receiver Alex Wesley, who spent the 2019 offseason with the Giants before being waived from injured reserve in September.

==== Week 16: vs. Kansas City Chiefs ====
Week Sixteen: Kansas City Chiefs at Chicago Bears – Game summary

Quarter	1	2	3	4	Total
**Chiefs**	7	10	0	9	**26**
Bears	0	0	3	0	**3**

at Soldier Field, Chicago, Illinois

- Date: December 22
- Game time: 7:20 p.m. CST
- Game weather: Clear, 45 °F (7 °C)
- Game attendance: 62,213
- Referee: Carl Cheffers
- TV announcers (NBC): Al Michaels, Cris Collinsworth and Michele Tafoya
- Recap, Game Book

Game information

**First quarter**

- KC – Patrick Mahomes 12-yard run (Harrison Butker kick), 1:30. Chiefs 7–0. **Drive: 15 plays, 82 yards, 7:58.**

**Second quarter**

- KC – Harrison Butker 56-yard field goal, 11:41. Chiefs 10–0. **Drive: 7 plays, 31 yards, 3:06.**
- KC – Travis Kelce 6-yard pass from Patrick Mahomes (Harrison Butker kick), 0:52. Chiefs 17–0. **Drive: 13 plays, 95 yards, 6:42.**

**Third quarter**

- CHI – Eddy Piñeiro 46-yard field goal, 0:00. Chiefs 17–3. **Drive: 6 plays, 23 yards, 2:50.**

**Fourth quarter**

- KC – Damien Williams 14-yard pass from Patrick Mahomes (kick failed, hit left upright), 10:05. Chiefs 23–3. **Drive: 9 plays, 71 yards, 4:55.**
- KC – Harrison Butker 32-yard field goal, 1:40. Chiefs 26–3. **Drive: 11 plays, 43 yards, 6:02.**

**Top passers**

- KC – Patrick Mahomes – 23/33, 251 yards, 2 TD
- CHI – Mitchell Trubisky – 18/34, 157 yards

**Top rushers**

- KC – Damien Williams – 16 rushes, 65 yards
- CHI – David Montgomery – 13 rushes, 57 yards

**Top receivers**

- KC – Travis Kelce – 8 receptions, 74 yards, TD
- CHI – Allen Robinson – 6 receptions, 53 yards

Chicago's final home game of 2019 came in Week 16 against the 10–4 Kansas City Chiefs, serving as a battle between Nagy and his former boss and Chiefs head coach Andy Reid. In 12 all-time games, the Bears led 7–5 and won their last meeting in 2015, though the two teams had alternated victories since their fourth game in 1987. Whitehair, Williams, and Pierre-Louis were the Bears' captains.

The Bears struggled throughout the first half as they punted on all three of their drives (a fourth series ended with a penalty that ran out the clock to conclude the half), while the Chiefs scored 17 points on their three possessions. Kansas City's three scores came via Patrick Mahomes' 12-yard touchdown run and a six-yard touchdown pass to Travis Kelce, while Harrison Butker made a 56-yard field goal; the Kelce touchdown also came on a 95-yard drive. Chicago attempted to improve in the second half as the offense reached the Chiefs' four-yard line, but Trubisky's fourth-down pass to Robinson was broken up by Charvarius Ward. After forcing a punt, the Bears finally scored with Piñeiro's 46-yard field goal as the third quarter ended. The Chiefs responded with a 14-yard touchdown throw from Mahomes to Damien Williams, though Butker's extra point hit both uprights to result in a miss. The kick drew comparisons to Cody Parkey's Double Doink miss that eliminated the Bears from the 2018 playoffs; like Parkey, Butker's miss came at Soldier Field's north end zone. Chicago's next drive ended with another turnover on downs when Trubisky was sacked for a 13-yard loss and a fourth-and-23 ended with an 11-yard gain by Saubert. After Butker made a 32-yard kick, the Bears turned it over again as Trubisky's pass to Robinson on fourth-and-six with six seconds left in the game fell incomplete.

==== Week 17: at Minnesota Vikings ====
Week Seventeen: Chicago Bears at Minnesota Vikings – Game summary

Quarter	1	2	3	4	Total
**Bears**	6	5	7	3	**21**
Vikings	0	6	0	13	**19**

at U.S. Bank Stadium, Minneapolis, Minnesota

- Date: December 29
- Game time: 12:00 p.m. CST
- Game weather: None (indoor stadium)
- Game attendance: 66 913
- Referee: John Hussey
- TV announcers (Fox): Dick Stockton, Mark Schlereth and Jennifer Hale
- Recap, Game Book

Game information

**First quarter**

- CHI – Eddy Piñeiro 26-yard field goal, 7:41. Bears 3–0. **Drive: 12 plays, 69 yards, 6:34.**
- CHI – Eddy Piñeiro 33-yard field goal, 0:44. Bears 6–0. **Drive: 10 plays, 24 yards, 5:33.**

**Second quarter**

- MIN – Dan Bailey 37-yard field goal, 9:17. Bears 6–3. **Drive: 14 plays, 56 yards, 6:27.**
- CHI – Mike Boone tackled in the end zone by Nick Kwiatkoski for a safety, 6:03. Bears 8–3.
- CHI – Eddy Piñeiro 34-yard field goal, 1:51. Bears 11–3. **Drive: 9 plays, 51 yards, 4:12.**
- MIN – Dan Bailey 38-yard field goal, 0:00. Bears 11–6. **Drive: 6 plays, 55 yards, 1:51.**

**Third quarter**

- CHI – David Montgomery 14-yard run (Eddy Piñeiro kick), 9:49. Bears 18–6. **Drive: 9 plays, 75 yards, 5:11.**

**Fourth quarter**

- MIN – Mike Boone 1-yard run (Dan Bailey kick), 14:13. Bears 18–13. **Drive: 8 plays, 43 yards, 3:47.**
- MIN – Dan Bailey 39-yard field goal, 8:54. Bears 18–16. **Drive: 9 plays, 59 yards, 4:20.**
- MIN – Dan Bailey 34-yard field goal, 4:53. Vikings 19–18. **Drive: 4 plays, 7 yards, 1:27.**
- CHI – Eddy Piñeiro 22-yard field goal, 0:10. Bears 21–19. **Drive: 15 plays, 71 yards, 4:43.**

**Top passers**

- CHI – Mitchell Trubisky – 26/37, 207 yards
- MIN – Sean Mannion – 12/21, 126 yards, 2 INT

**Top rushers**

- CHI – David Montgomery – 23 rushes, 113 yards, TD
- MIN – Mike Boone – 17 rushes, 148 yards, TD

**Top receivers**

- CHI – Allen Robinson – 9 receptions, 71 yards
- MIN – Alexander Hollins – 2 receptions, 46 yards

Chicago ended the 2019 season at U.S. Bank Stadium against 10–5 Minnesota. With the Vikings locked into the sixth playoff seed, they elected to deactivate various starters including linebacker Eric Kendricks and offensive tackles Riley Reiff and Brian O'Neill. Cousins also did not play the game, with backup Sean Mannion instead seeing action. Holtz, Patterson, and Robertson-Harris served as team captains.

Vikings third-string running back Mike Boone recorded a 59-yard carry on the first play from scrimmage before dropping a pitch from Mannion that was recovered by Nichols. The Bears capitalized on the takeaway by reaching the Vikings' eight-yard line, where Piñeiro made a 26-yard field goal. The cycle of a Bears takeaway leading to a Piñeiro field goal continued on the ensuing drive when Mannion's pass to Boone was tipped and intercepted by Pierre-Louis, leading to Piñeiro's 33-yard kick. In the second quarter, Bailey made a 37-yard field goal, though Kwiatkoski tackled Boone in the end zone on Minnesota's following series for a Bears safety. The two teams traded field goals of 34 (Piñeiro) and 38 (Bailey) yards to end the first half with Chicago leading 11–6. On the Bears' opening second-half drive, the offense focused on rushing as all but one of their nine plays was a run by Montgomery or Nall (the exception being a ten-yard pass by Trubisky to Ridley). Receiving support from Daniels, Holtz, Larsen, and Lucas, Montgomery pushed through a group of Vikings for a 14-yard touchdown. After the Vikings punted and the Bears turned over the ball on downs when Trubisky's sneak failed, Boone recorded a one-yard touchdown run to start the fourth quarter. The margin decreased to two points after Bailey converted a 39-yard field goal, followed by Ifeadi Odenigbo sacking Trubisky and forcing a fumble; although Odenigbo returned it for a touchdown, a review overturned the score as his knee was down at Chicago's 23-yard line. Bailey eventually made a 34-yard kick to put the Vikings up 19–18. Trubisky and the offense responded with a 15-play, 71-yard drive that reached the Vikings' four-yard line, where Piñeiro made the game-winning 22-yard field goal; the series was supported by Trubisky's 32-yard completion to Ridley on fourth-and-nine. With four seconds remaining, Mannion's Hail Mary was intercepted by Jackson.

With the win, the Bears finished their disappointing season 8–8, the first time they had back-to-back non-losing seasons since the 2012 and 2013 season.

=== Standings ===
==== Division ====
NFC North
	W	L	T	PCT	DIV	CONF	PF	PA	STK
^{(2)} Green Bay Packers	13	3	0	.813	6–0	10–2	376	313	W5
^{(6)} Minnesota Vikings	10	6	0	.625	2–4	7–5	407	303	L2
Chicago Bears	8	8	0	.500	4–2	7–5	280	298	W1
Detroit Lions	3	12	1	.219	0–6	2–9–1	341	423	L9

==== Conference ====
NFC
#	Team	Division	W	L	T	PCT	DIV	CONF	SOS	SOV	STK
**Division leaders**
1 (Note: San Francisco finished ahead of Green Bay and New Orleans based on head-to-head sweep, claiming the No. 1 seed.)	San Francisco 49ers	West	13	3	0	.813	5–1	10–2	.504	.466	W2
2 (Note: Green Bay claimed the No. 2 seed over New Orleans based on conference record.)	Green Bay Packers	North	13	3	0	.813	6–0	10–2	.453	.428	W5
3	New Orleans Saints	South	13	3	0	.813	5–1	9–3	.486	.459	W3
4	Philadelphia Eagles	East	9	7	0	.563	5–1	7–5	.455	.417	W4
**Wild Cards**
5	Seattle Seahawks	West	11	5	0	.688	3–3	8–4	.531	.463	L2
6	Minnesota Vikings	North	10	6	0	.625	2–4	7–5	.477	.356	L2
**Did not qualify for the postseason**
7	Los Angeles Rams	West	9	7	0	.563	3–3	7–5	.535	.438	W1
8 (Note: Chicago finished ahead of Dallas based on head-to-head victory.)	Chicago Bears	North	8	8	0	.500	4–2	7–5	.508	.383	W1
9	Dallas Cowboys	East	8	8	0	.500	5–1	7–5	.479	.316	W1
10 (Note: Atlanta finished ahead of Tampa Bay based on division record.)	Atlanta Falcons	South	7	9	0	.438	4–2	6–6	.545	.518	W4
11	Tampa Bay Buccaneers	South	7	9	0	.438	2–4	5–7	.500	.384	L2
12	Arizona Cardinals	West	5	10	1	.344	1–5	3–8–1	.529	.375	L1
13	Carolina Panthers	South	5	11	0	.313	1–5	2–10	.549	.469	L8
14	New York Giants	East	4	12	0	.250	2–4	3–9	.473	.281	L1
15	Detroit Lions	North	3	12	1	.219	0–6	2–9–1	.506	.375	L9
16	Washington Redskins	East	3	13	0	.188	0–6	2–10	.502	.281	L4
**Tiebreakers** (Note: When breaking ties for three or more teams under the NFL's rules, they are first broken within divisions, then comparing only the highest-ranked remaining team from each division.)

== Postseason ==
The Bears ended 2019 with an 8–8 record and third in the NFC North, failing to make the playoffs after winning the division in 2018. Of the six teams defeated by the Bears, four finished their seasons with losing records with the Vikings being the lone team with a winning season.

Offensively, Chicago struggled mightily as they ranked 29th in scoring with 17.5 points per game and in total yards at 296.8. The team averaged just 4.7 yards per play, the second fewest in the NFL, and was last in the league in net yards per attempt (5.3). In all but five games, the Bears also failed to score a touchdown in the first half. Trubisky, who made the Pro Bowl in 2018, suffered regressions in passing categories including yardage (3,138), completion percentage (63.2), touchdowns (17), and rating (83). The offensive line also struggled in numerous fields including injuries to Long and Massie, a failed position swap between center Whitehair and guard Daniels, and penalties; by season's end, the Bears suffered 43 sacks (12th most in the league) and averaged just 91.1 rushing yards per game (sixth worst). Despite his teammates' struggles, Robinson recorded 98 receptions—the fifth most in team history—for 1,147 yards and seven touchdowns. Offensive coaches Helfrich, Harry Hiestand (offensive line), and Kevin M. Gilbride (tight ends) were fired after the season.

On defense, while their turnovers forced decreased from 36 to 19, the Bears were ranked eighth overall and ninth in individual run and pass defense categories. Chicago was also the only team ranked in the top five in points allowed (18.6 per game) that did not qualify for the playoffs.

On December 30, the Bears signed practice squad players Boyd, Crawford, Davis, Denmark, Ives, Mustipher, Raymond, and Vaughters to reserve/future contracts. Vaughters was the lone player of the nine to see regular season action in 2019, playing against the Rams, Lions, and Eagles.

== Awards ==
During the 2019 season, various players received weekly awards from the league or its sponsors for their accomplishments in certain games. In Week 2, Piñeiro was named NFC Special Teams Player of the Week and Snickers' Hungriest Player of the Week for his game-winning kick. Trubisky won Week 13's FedEx Air Player of the Week after completing 29 of 38 passes for 338 yards, three touchdowns, an interception, and a passer rating of 118.1 against the Lions. At the end of November, Patterson was named NFC Special Teams Player of the Month, the first Bears player to win the award since Devin Hester in October 2011; during the month, Patterson recorded 294 kickoff return yards on ten attempts and four tackles as a punt gunner.

On December 17, the 2020 Pro Bowl rosters were revealed, with Patterson, Mack, and Jackson being voted as starters. Goldman, Fuller, and Cohen were named alternates for the all-star game. Fuller was added to the Pro Bowl roster on January 9, taking the place of the injured Jalen Ramsey.

In January, Patterson was named a first-team All-Pro kick returner and second-team All-Pro special teamer by the Associated Press. Sporting News also named Patterson to their All-Pro roster as a first-team returner.
