= Joel Iyiegbuniwe =

American football player (born 1995)

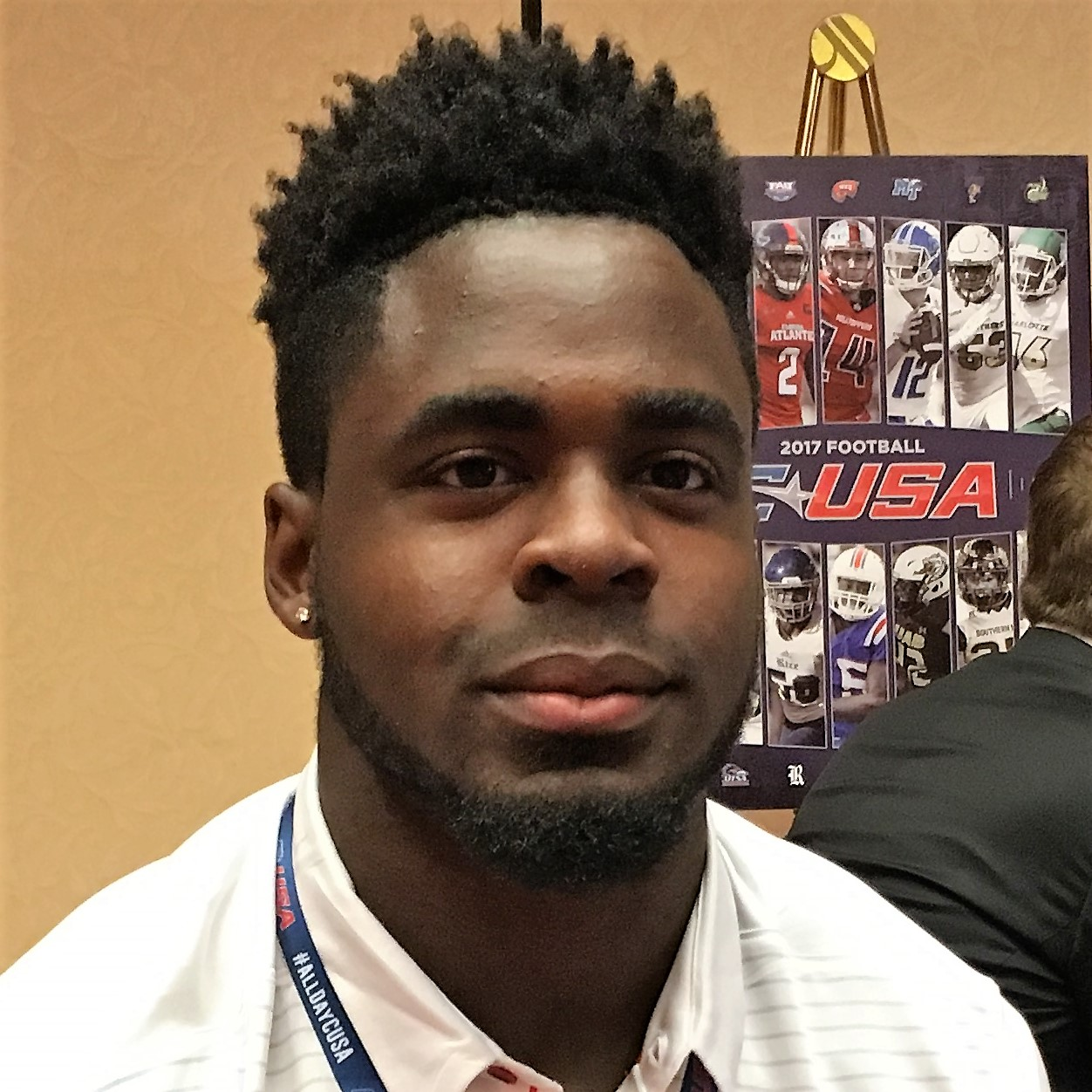
- Iyiegbuniwe in 2017

Profile
- Position: Linebacker

Personal information
- Born: October 12, 1995 (age 31); Chicago, Illinois, U.S.
- Listed height: 6 ft 1 in (1.85 m)
- Listed weight: 235 lb (107 kg)

Career information
- High school: South Warren (Bowling Green, Kentucky)
- College: Western Kentucky (2014–2017)
- NFL draft: 2018: 4th round, 115th overall pick

Career history
- Chicago Bears (2018–2021); Seattle Seahawks (2022)*; Carolina Panthers (2022); San Antonio Brahmas (2024); Detroit Lions (2024)*
- * Offseason or practice squad member only

Awards and highlights
- First-team All-CUSA (2017)

Career NFL statistics
- Total tackles: 31
- Forced fumbles: 1
- Pass deflections: 1
- Stats at Pro Football Reference

Joel Iyiegbuniwe (born October 12, 1995) is an American professional football linebacker. He played college football for the Western Kentucky Hilltoppers.

== Early life ==
Iyiegbuniwe attended South Warren High School in Bowling Green, Kentucky. Although he only played in four games as a senior, he tallied 23 tackles and one interception along with six touchdowns. As a junior he made 64 tackles with three interceptions along with four touchdowns. Iyiegbuniwe committed to play football for the Western Kentucky Hilltoppers in December 2013, choosing them over Indiana State and Southern Illinois.

== College career ==
As a true freshman in 2014, Iyiegbuniwe played in the first three games of Western Kentucky's season before a knee injury ended his season. He elected to take a medical redshirt.

In 2015, as a redshirt freshman, Iyiegbuniwe played in all 14 of Western Kentucky's games, recording 19 tackles and one sack.

In 2016, Iyiegbuniwe, now a redshirt sophomore, once again appeared in all 14 games. He made 64 tackles (10 for loss), 3.5 sacks, three pass deflections and one forced fumble. He was awarded 2016 C-USA Honorable Mention.

As a redshirt junior in 2017, Iyiegbuniwe played in all 13 games, recording 117 tackles (11.5 for loss), two sacks, one pass deflection and three forced fumbles. He was named to the 2017 C-USA First-team. After the season, he declared for the 2018 NFL draft.

== Professional career ==
Pre-draft measurables
Height	Weight	Arm length	Hand span	40-yard dash	10-yard split	20-yard split	20-yard shuttle	Three-cone drill	Vertical jump	Broad jump	Bench press
6 ft 1 3/8 in (1.86 m)	229 lb (104 kg)	32 5/8 in (0.83 m)	10 1/4 in (0.26 m)	4.60 s	1.60 s	2.70 s	4.28 s	7.06 s	35.0 in (0.89 m)	9 ft 9 in (2.97 m)	19 reps
All values from NFL Combine

=== Chicago Bears ===
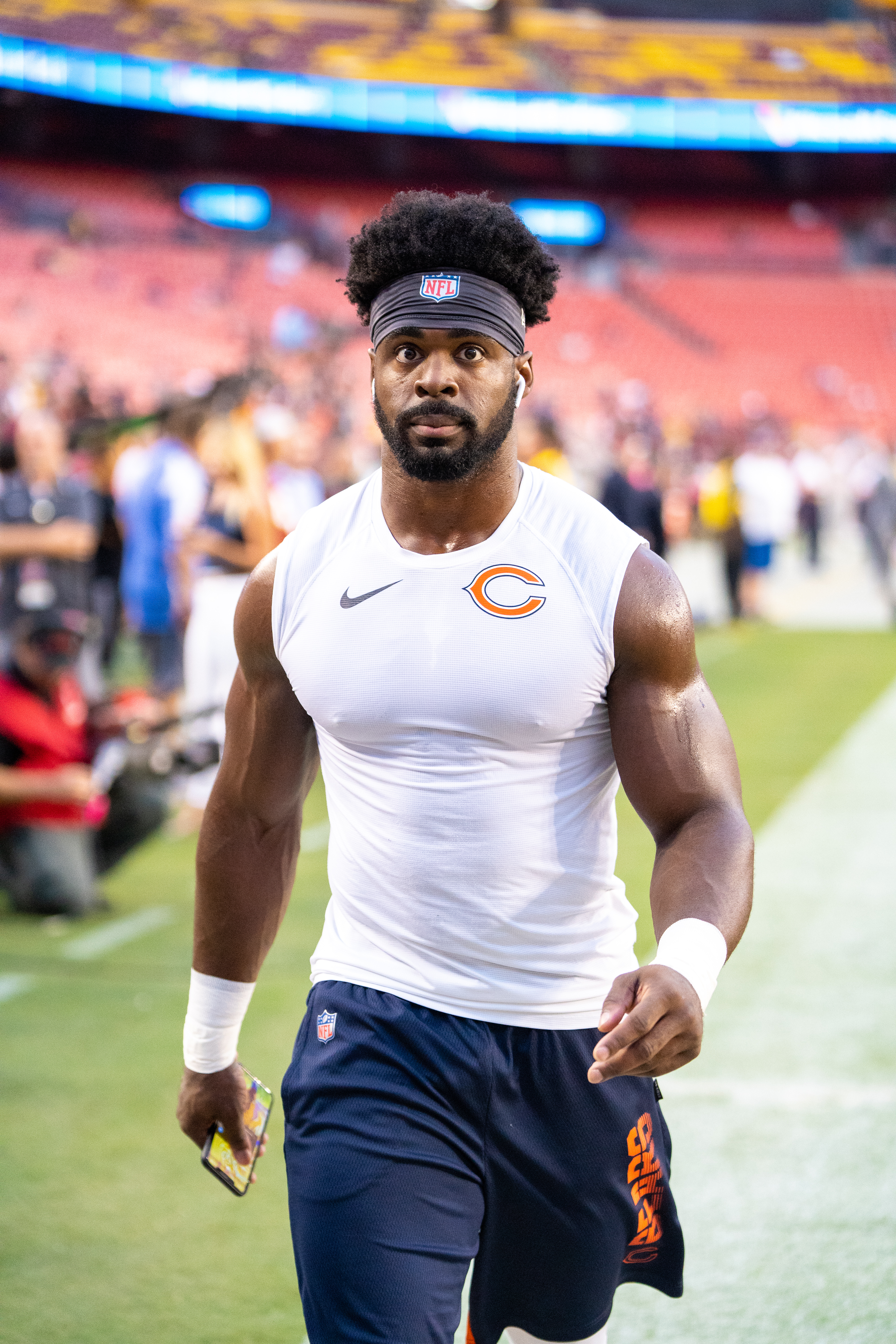
Iyiegbuniwe in a game against the Washington Redskins

Iyiegbuniwe was selected by the Chicago Bears in the fourth round (115th overall) of the 2018 NFL Draft.

=== Seattle Seahawks ===
On March 24, 2022, Iyiegbuniwe signed a one-year contract with the Seattle Seahawks. He was released by Seattle on August 20.

=== Carolina Panthers ===
On October 20, 2022, Iyiegbuniwe was signed to the practice squad of the Carolina Panthers. He was promoted to the active roster on November 19.

=== San Antonio Brahmas ===
On January 19, 2024, Iyiegbuniwe signed with the San Antonio Brahmas of the United Football League (UFL). His contract was terminated on August 19, to sign with an NFL team.

=== Detroit Lions ===
On August 19, 2024, Iyiegbuniwe signed with the Detroit Lions. He was released on August 27.

== Personal life ==
Iyiegbuniwe is of Nigerian descent.
