= Kerrith Whyte =

American football player (born 1996)

No. 38
- Position: Running back

Personal information
- Born: October 31, 1996 (age 30); Loxahatchee, Florida, U.S.
- Listed height: 5 ft 10 in (1.78 m)
- Listed weight: 204 lb (93 kg)

Career information
- High school: Seminole Ridge (Loxahatchee)
- College: Florida Atlantic (2015–2018)
- NFL draft: 2019: 7th round, 222nd overall pick

Career history
- Chicago Bears (2019); Pittsburgh Steelers (2019); Detroit Lions (2020)*; Buffalo Bills (2021)*; Jacksonville Jaguars (2021)*; Green Bay Packers (2021)*; Denver Broncos (2021)*; Green Bay Packers (2021)*; Memphis Showboats (2023)
- * Offseason or practice squad member only

Career NFL statistics
- Rushing yards: 122
- Rushing average: 5.1
- Receptions: 1
- Receiving yards: 9
- Stats at Pro Football Reference

Kerrith Whyte Jr. (born October 31, 1996) is an American former professional football player who was a running back in the National Football League (NFL). He played college football for the Florida Atlantic Owls, and was selected by the Chicago Bears in the seventh round of the 2019 NFL draft. He has also played for the Pittsburgh Steelers, Buffalo Bills, Jacksonville Jaguars, and the Green Bay Packers

== College career ==
Whyte attended Florida Atlantic, where he spent his career behind starting back Devin Singletary. In 2018, Whyte recorded a career-high 134 carries for 866 yards and eight touchdowns, along with 19 kickoff returns for an average of 28.7 yards and a touchdown.

He ended his FAU career with 232 total carries for 1,358 and 11 touchdowns, 22 receptions for 327 yards and two touchdowns, and an 81 kickoff return for 26.1 average yards and two scores.

== Professional career ==
=== Pre-draft ===
Pre-draft measurables
Height	Weight	Arm length	Hand span	40-yard dash	10-yard split	20-yard split	20-yard shuttle	Three-cone drill	Vertical jump	Broad jump	Bench press
5 ft 10 in (1.78 m)	197 lb (89 kg)	29 7/8 in (0.76 m)	9 1/2 in (0.24 m)	4.37 s	1.57 s	2.53 s	4.37 s	7.20 s	42.0 in (1.07 m)	11 ft 0 in (3.35 m)	21 reps
All values from Pro Day

Before the 2019 NFL draft, Whyte participated at FAU's Pro Day, where he recorded a 40-yard dash time of 4.36 seconds; the time would have been the second fastest at the NFL Scouting Combine.

=== Chicago Bears ===
In the seventh round, the Chicago Bears drafted Whyte with the 222nd overall pick. Bears running back coach Charles London had conducted a private workout with Whyte at FAU prior to the draft. He signed his four-year rookie contract on May 13. He was waived on September 26 and re-signed to the practice squad the next day.

=== Pittsburgh Steelers ===
On November 16, 2019, Whyte was signed by the Pittsburgh Steelers off the Bears' practice squad. Due to injuries to the Steelers' top running backs, on December 8, 2019, Whyte accounted for 74 total yards in a win against the Arizona Cardinals. In the 2019 season, Whyte totaled 24 carries for 122 rushing yards in six games.

On September 5, 2020, Whyte was waived by the Steelers.

=== Detroit Lions ===
On September 9, 2020, Whyte was signed to the Detroit Lions' practice squad. He was placed on the practice squad/injured list on October 6.

=== Buffalo Bills ===
On August 24, 2021, Whyte signed a one-year deal with the Buffalo Bills. He was waived six days later.

=== Jacksonville Jaguars ===
On October 12, 2021, Whyte was signed to the Jacksonville Jaguars' practice squad. The Jaguars released him on November 8.

=== Green Bay Packers (first stint) ===
The Green Bay Packers signed Whyte to their practice squad on November 16, 2021. He was released on November 25.

=== Denver Broncos ===
On November 30, 2021, Whyte was signed to the Denver Broncos practice squad. He was released on December 21.

=== Green Bay Packers (second stint) ===
On December 29, 2021, Whyte was again signed to the Green Bay Packers practice squad.

=== Memphis Showboats ===
Whyte signed with the Tampa Bay Bandits of the United States Football League on November 3, 2022. He and all other Bandits players were transferred to the Memphis Showboats after it was announced that the Bandits were taking a hiatus and that the Showboats were joining the league. Whyte was released on April 10, and re-signed on April 25. He was released on March 10, 2024.
