= Thomas Ives =

American football player (born 1996)

Profile
- Position: Wide receiver

Personal information
- Born: June 25, 1997 (age 29); Hinsdale, Illinois, U.S.
- Listed height: 6 ft 4 in (1.93 m)
- Listed weight: 218 lb (99 kg)

Career information
- High school: Hinsdale Central
- College: Colgate
- NFL draft: 2019: undrafted

Career history
- Chicago Bears (2019–2021)*
- * Offseason or practice squad member only
- Stats at Pro Football Reference

Thomas Ives (born June 25, 1997) is an American football wide receiver. He played college football at Colgate and was signed by the Chicago Bears as an undrafted free agent in 2019.

== Early life ==
At Hinsdale Central High School, Ives played for the football and basketball teams. In 2014, Hinsdale Central reached the Class 8A state playoffs with an 8–3 record; Ives led the team as a captain with 48 receptions for 888 yards and 12 touchdowns. Ives led the team in scoring as he broke program records for receptions and receiving touchdowns in a season.

== College career ==
Ives attended Colgate, where he played wide receiver for the football program for four years, beginning in 2015.

In his freshman season, Ives saw little playing time in the regular season, catching just one pass for nine yards in a week eight win over Georgetown. But across three playoff games, Ives hauled in five passes for 98 yards. In his sophomore season, Ives caught nine passes for 142 yards and one touchdown. As a junior, Ives led the Raiders in several statistical categories, as he hauled in a team-best 353 receiving yards and seven touchdowns. He tied for the second-most receptions on the team, with 23 passes caught. Prior to his senior season, Ives was named a team captain and to the preseason all-Patriot League team. Ives caught just 15 passes for 263 yards and one touchdown as an injury limited Ives in two games and took him out of three games.

Ives graduated from Colgate with a degree in political science.

== Professional career ==
Ives signed with the Chicago Bears as an undrafted free agent following the 2019 NFL draft. On August 31, 2019, Ives was released by the Bears as part of final roster cuts, but was signed to the practice squad the next day. On December 30, 2019, Ives was signed to a reserve/future contract.

Like in 2019, Ives was among the Bears' last roster cuts prior to the 2020 season on September 5, 2020, before joining the practice squad the next day. He was placed on the practice squad/COVID-19 list by the team on December 8, 2020, and restored to the practice squad on December 22. On January 11, 2021, Ives signed a reserve/futures contract with the Bears. He was waived/injured on August 13, 2021, and placed on injured reserve. He was released on August 20, 2021.
