= Rashaad Coward =

American football player (born 1994)

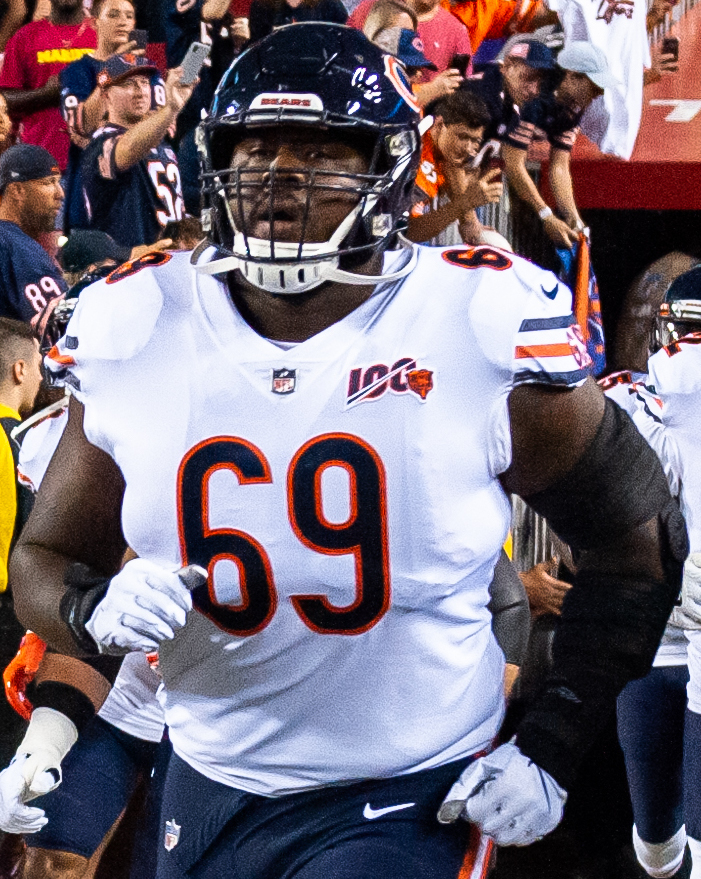
- Coward with the Chicago Bears in 2019.

No. 69, 79, 65, 73
- Position: Offensive tackle

Personal information
- Born: November 6, 1994 (age 32); Brooklyn, New York, U.S.
- Listed height: 6 ft 5 in (1.96 m)
- Listed weight: 319 lb (145 kg)

Career information
- High school: Sheepshead Bay (Brooklyn)
- College: Old Dominion (2013–2016)
- NFL draft: 2017: undrafted

Career history
- Chicago Bears (2017–2020); Pittsburgh Steelers (2021); Jacksonville Jaguars (2021); Pittsburgh Steelers (2021)*; Atlanta Falcons (2022)*; Arizona Cardinals (2022); Houston Texans (2023)*; Houston Roughnecks (2024)*; San Antonio Brahmas (2024)
- * Offseason or practice squad member only

Career NFL statistics
- Games played: 38
- Games started: 18
- Stats at Pro Football Reference

Rashaad Coward (born November 6, 1994) is an American former professional football player who was an offensive tackle in the National Football League (NFL). He played college football as a defensive end for the Old Dominion Monarchs. He has been a member of the Chicago Bears, Pittsburgh Steelers, Jacksonville Jaguars, Atlanta Falcons, Arizona Cardinals, Houston Texans, and Houston Roughnecks.

== Professional career ==
=== Chicago Bears ===
Coward signed with the Chicago Bears as an undrafted free agent on May 11, 2017. He was waived on September 2, 2017 and was signed to the practice squad the next day. He was promoted to the active roster on December 9, 2017, and made his regular-season debut in the Week 14 game against the Cincinnati Bengals.

Although Coward was a defensive end during his rookie year, head coach Matt Nagy announced that Coward would be moved to offensive line for the 2018 season. He was an exclusive-rights free agent (ERFA) after the year, but returned to the Bears after being tendered a contract.

In 2019, Coward started ten games at right guard after Kyle Long suffered a season-ending injury. He became an ERFA for the second time at season's end before re-signing on April 17, 2020.

=== Pittsburgh Steelers (first stint) ===
Coward signed a one-year contract with the Pittsburgh Steelers on March 30, 2021. He was released on October 9, 2021.

=== Jacksonville Jaguars ===
On October 12, 2021, Coward signed with the Jacksonville Jaguars. On October 21, Coward was released by the Jaguars.

=== Pittsburgh Steelers (second stint) ===
On November 23, 2021, Coward was signed to the Steelers practice squad.

=== Atlanta Falcons ===
On January 24, 2022, Coward signed a reserve/future contract with the Atlanta Falcons. On June 2, 2022, he was released by the Falcons.

=== Arizona Cardinals ===
On August 2, 2022, Coward signed with the Arizona Cardinals. He was waived on August 30, 2022 and signed to the practice squad the next day. He was placed on the practice squad/injured list on September 14, 2022. He was released on September 19. He was re-signed on November 2. He was promoted to the active roster on November 15.

=== Houston Texans ===
On August 8, 2023, Coward signed with the Houston Texans. He was released on August 29, 2023.

=== Houston Roughnecks ===
On December 8, 2023, Coward signed with the Houston Roughnecks of the XFL. The Roughnecks brand was transferred to the Houston Gamblers when the XFL and United States Football League merged to create the United Football League (UFL).

=== San Antonio Brahmas ===
On January 5, 2024, Coward was selected by the San Antonio Brahmas during the 2024 UFL dispersal draft.
