= Xavier Crawford =

American football player (born 1995)

No. 21, 28, 29, 37, 47
- Position: Cornerback

Personal information
- Born: December 10, 1995 (age 30); Pittsburg, California, U.S.
- Listed height: 6 ft 0 in (1.83 m)
- Listed weight: 188 lb (85 kg)

Career information
- High school: Pittsburg
- College: Oregon State (2015–2017); Central Michigan (2018)
- NFL draft: 2019: 6th round, 195th overall pick

Career history
- Houston Texans (2019); Miami Dolphins (2019); Chicago Bears (2019–2021); Jacksonville Jaguars (2022)*; Seattle Seahawks (2022)
- * Offseason or practice squad member only

Awards and highlights
- First-team All-MAC (2018)

Career NFL statistics
- Total tackles: 24
- Stats at Pro Football Reference

Xavier Crawford (born December 10, 1995) is an American former professional football player who was a cornerback in the National Football League (NFL). He played college football for the Oregon State Beavers and Central Michigan Chippewas.

== Professional career ==
Pre-draft measurables
Height	Weight	Arm length	Hand span	40-yard dash	10-yard split	20-yard split	Vertical jump	Bench press
5 ft 10 7/8 in (1.80 m)	187 lb (85 kg)	29 1/8 in (0.74 m)	9 in (0.23 m)	4.48 s	1.62 s	2.66 s	37.5 in (0.95 m)	11 reps
All values from NFL Combine

=== Houston Texans ===
Crawford was selected by the Houston Texans in the sixth round (195th overall) of the 2019 NFL draft. He was waived on October 26, 2019.

=== Miami Dolphins ===
On October 28, 2019, Crawford was claimed off waivers by the Miami Dolphins. He was waived on November 30, 2019 and re-signed to the practice squad. He was released on December 5, 2019.

=== Chicago Bears ===
On December 9, 2019, Crawford was signed to the Chicago Bears practice squad. On December 30, 2019, Crawford was signed to a reserve/future contract. After being one of the final roster cuts on September 5, 2020, he was signed to the practice squad a day later. He was elevated to the active roster on December 19, December 26, and January 2, 2021, for the team's weeks 15, 16, and 17 games against the Minnesota Vikings, Jacksonville Jaguars, and Green Bay Packers, and reverted to the practice squad after each game. On January 11, 2021, Crawford signed a reserve/futures contract with the Bears. Crawford was placed on injured reserve on December 29, 2021.

=== Jacksonville Jaguars ===
On March 24, 2022, Crawford signed with the Jaguars. He was waived on August 30, 2022.

=== Seattle Seahawks ===
On September 1, 2022, Crawford was signed to the Seattle Seahawks practice squad. He was promoted to the active roster on September 28. He was released on October 11 and re-signed to the practice squad. He was promoted to the active roster on December 27.
