= Stephen Denmark =

American football player (born 1996)

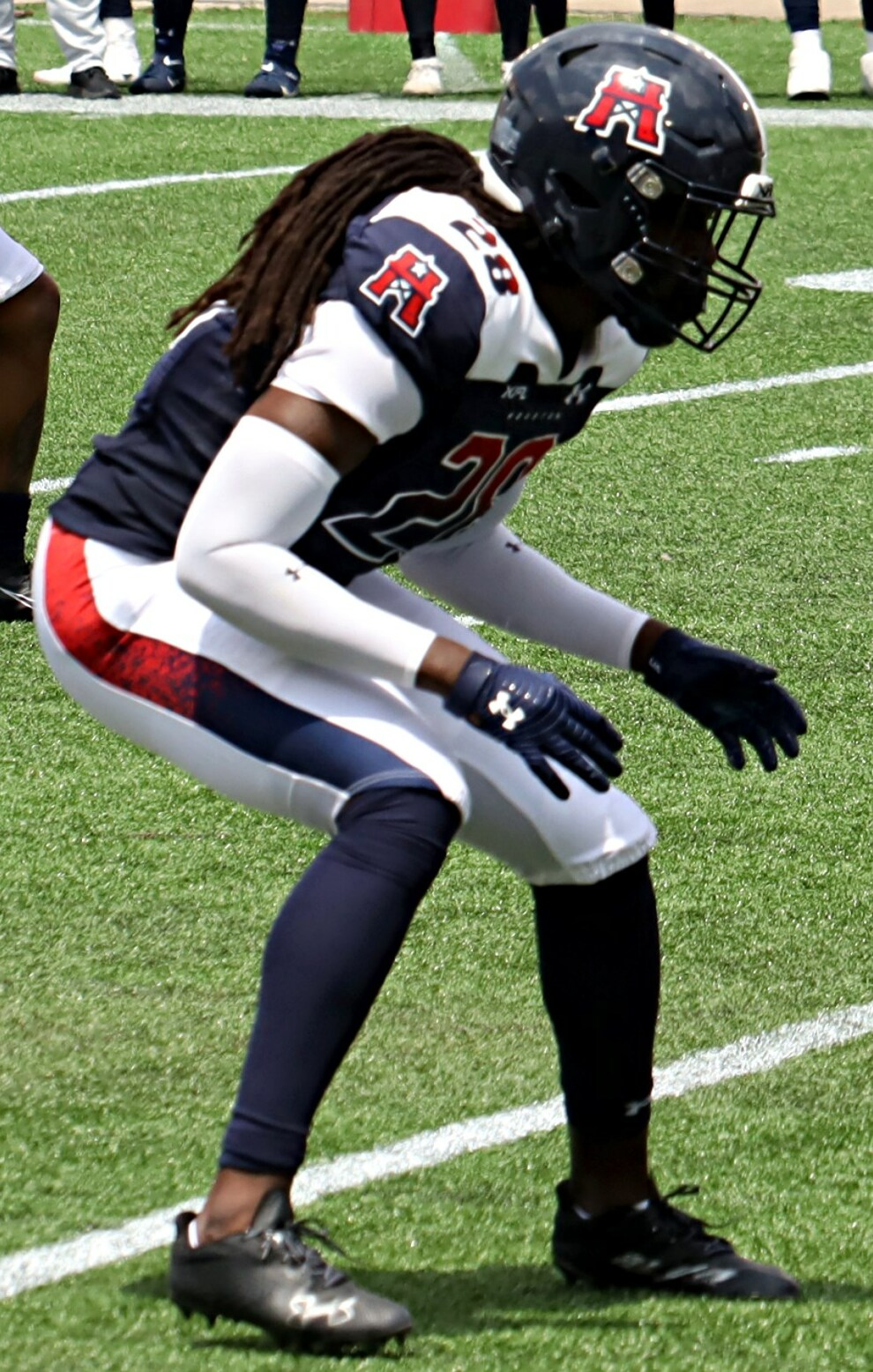
- Denmark with the Houston Roughnecks in 2023

No. 28
- Position: Cornerback

Personal information
- Born: April 20, 1996 (age 30); Tallahassee, Florida, U.S.
- Listed height: 6 ft 2 in (1.88 m)
- Listed weight: 217 lb (98 kg)

Career information
- High school: James S. Rickards
- College: Valdosta State
- NFL draft: 2019: 7th round, 238th overall pick

Career history
- Chicago Bears (2019–2020)*; Cleveland Browns (2020)*; Pittsburgh Steelers (2021)*; Green Bay Packers (2021)*; Saskatchewan Roughriders (2022)*; San Antonio Brahmas (2023); Houston Roughnecks (2023)
- * Offseason or practice squad member only

Awards and highlights
- NCAA Division II Football champion (2018)
- Stats at Pro Football Reference

Stephen Denmark (born April 20, 1996) is an American former professional football cornerback. He played college football at Valdosta State. He was selected by the Chicago Bears in the seventh round of the 2019 NFL draft. Denmark was also a member of the Cleveland Browns, Pittsburgh Steelers, Green Bay Packers, Saskatchewan Roughriders, San Antonio Brahmas, and Houston Roughnecks.

== Early life ==
At James S. Rickards High School, Denmark ran track and played for the football team. In 2013, Rickards reached the Class 5A state playoffs with a 9–2 record; Denmark had 49 receptions for 851 yards and 12 touchdowns, along with two kickoff return touchdowns.

== College career ==
Denmark attended Valdosta State, where he played wide receiver for three years. In 2018, Denmark converted to cornerback, where he recorded 55 tackles and three interceptions as Valdosta State won the NCAA Division II Football Championship.

== Professional career ==
=== Chicago Bears ===
Denmark was drafted by the Chicago Bears in the seventh round (238th overall) of the 2019 NFL draft. Before the draft, Denmark worked out with Bears secondary coach Deshea Townsend and assistant director of player personnel Champ Kelly. He signed his four-year rookie contract on May 13. On August 31, 2019, the Bears released Denmark as part of final roster cuts and was signed to the practice squad the next day. On December 30, 2019, Denmark was signed to a reserve/future contract. After being waived on September 5, 2020, Denmark was added to the practice squad a day later. He was released on October 5.

=== Cleveland Browns ===
On November 10, 2020, Denmark was signed to the Cleveland Browns' practice squad. Denmark was released from the Browns' practice squad on December 1, 2020.

=== Pittsburgh Steelers ===
On January 21, 2021, Denmark signed a reserve/future contract with the Pittsburgh Steelers. He was waived on August 17, 2021.

=== Green Bay Packers ===
On August 25, 2021, Denmark signed with the Green Bay Packers. On August 31, 2021, Packers released Denmark as part of their final roster cuts.

=== Saskatchewan Roughriders ===
On March 23, 2022 it was announced that Denmark had signed with the Saskatchewan Roughriders of the Canadian Football League (CFL).

=== San Antonio Brahmas ===
On November 17, 2022, Denmark was drafted by the San Antonio Brahmas of the XFL. He signed with the team on February 21, 2023. He was waived from the reserve list on April 5, 2023.

=== Houston Roughnecks ===
On April 5, 2023, Denmark was claimed off waivers by the Houston Roughnecks. He was released on June 22, 2023.
