= Isaiah Irving =

American football player (born 1994)

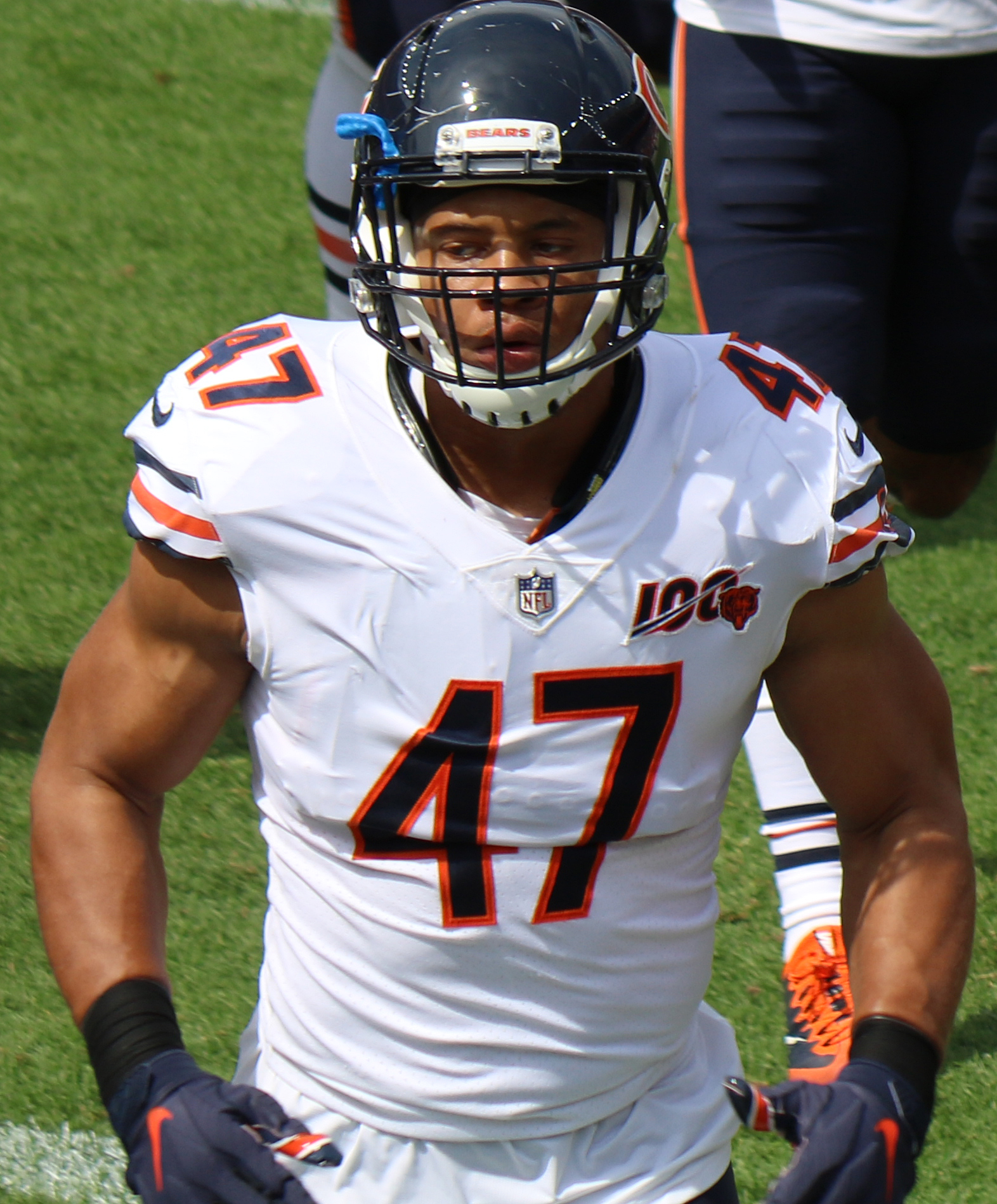
- Irving with the Chicago Bears in 2019

No. 47, 54
- Position: Linebacker

Personal information
- Born: June 9, 1994 (age 32); Oakland, California, U.S.
- Listed height: 6 ft 3 in (1.91 m)
- Listed weight: 254 lb (115 kg)

Career information
- High school: Cypress Creek (Houston, Texas)
- College: San Jose State (2013–2016)
- NFL draft: 2017: undrafted

Career history
- Chicago Bears (2017–2019); Denver Broncos (2020)*; Arizona Cardinals (2020)
- * Offseason or practice squad member only

Career NFL statistics
- Total tackles: 27
- Sacks: 1
- Fumble recoveries: 1
- Stats at Pro Football Reference

Isaiah Emmanuel Irving (born June 9, 1994) is an American former professional football player who was a linebacker in the National Football League (NFL). He played college football for the San Jose State Spartans.

== Early life and college ==
Born in Oakland, California, Irving was raised in Vacaville, California, and Houston, Texas. He graduated from Cypress Creek High School in Houston in 2013.

Irving appeared in 47 games with 37 starts for the Spartans, recording 140 tackles, 23 tackles-for-loss, 11 sacks and 1 forced fumble. He was named honorable mention All-Mountain West Conference as a senior and led the team in sacks.

== Professional career ==
=== Chicago Bears ===
Irving signed with the Chicago Bears as an undrafted free agent on May 11, 2017. He was waived on September 2, 2017, and was signed to the Bears' practice squad the next day. He was promoted to the active roster on October 9, 2017. He was placed on injured reserve on December 2, 2017, with a knee injury.

In 2018, Irving appeared in 13 games, during which he recorded eight tackles and a sack, the latter of which came against Nathan Peterman of the Buffalo Bills. He was an exclusive-rights free agent after the 2018 season, but returned to the Bears after being tendered a contract on March 13, 2019, which he signed on April 15.

Irving re-signed with the Bears on a one-year contract on April 3, 2020. He was waived/injured on September 5, 2020, and subsequently reverted to the team's injured reserve list the next day. He was waived with an injury settlement on September 7.

=== Denver Broncos ===
On September 16, 2020, Irving was signed to the Denver Broncos practice squad.

=== Arizona Cardinals ===
On October 15, 2020, Irving was signed by the Arizona Cardinals off the Broncos practice squad. On October 27, 2020, Irving was placed on injured reserve after suffering a neck injury in Week 7.
