= John McCormick =

John McCormick may refer to:

== Media ==
- John D. McCormick, reporter for Bloomberg News and formerly the Chicago Tribune
- John Patrick McCormick (born 1950), American journalist for Newsweek and editor for the Chicago Tribune
- John McCormick (producer) (1893–1961), American producer and husband of film star Colleen Moore (1922–1930)

== Politics ==
- John McCormick (Canadian politician) (1858–1936), Canadian merchant and politician in Nova Scotia, Canada
- John McCormick (British politician) (1887/8–1958), member of the Senate of Northern Ireland
- John E. McCormick (1924–2010), American jurist and legislator
- John W. McCormick (1831–1917), American politician and U.S. representative from Ohio

== Sports ==
- John McCormick (Rotherham footballer), 19th Century player for Rotherham, see 1894–95 Bury F.C. season
- John McCormick (footballer, born 1936) (1936–2017), Scottish footballer
- John McCormick (American football) (1937–2013), American football player
- John McCormick (Australian footballer) (1899–1974), Australian rules footballer

== Academics ==
- John O. McCormick (1918–2010), American literary scholar
- John McCormick (Jean Monnet Chair) (born 1954), professor of political science at Indiana University Purdue University Indianapolis
- John P. McCormick (political scientist) (born 1966), American political scientist and Karl J. Weintraub Professor at the University of Chicago

== Other people ==
- John B. McCormick (1834–1924), American mechanical engineer
- John F. McCormick, U.S. Coast Guard sailor, namesake of USCGC John McCormick
- John Rockefeller McCormick (1896–1901), American child victim of scarlet fever; grandson of John D. Rockefeller, his parents funded research for its cure
- John Wesley McCormick (1754–1837), American pioneer who homesteaded in Indiana and the namesake of McCormick's Creek State Park
- John N. McCormick (1863–1939), bishop of Western Michigan in the Episcopal Church

== Other uses ==
- USCGC John McCormick, a Sentinel-class U.S. Coast Guard cutter

== See also ==
- John McCormack (disambiguation)
