= John McCormack =

John McCormack may refer to:

== Sportspeople ==
- Cec McCormack or John Cecil McCormack (1922–1995), English footballer
- John McCormack (ice hockey) (1925–2017), Canadian ice hockey player
- John McCormack (boxer) (1935–2014), Scottish boxer
- John McCormack (diver) (1925-1987), American Olympic diver
- Young McCormack or John McCormack (born 1944), Irish boxer
- John McCormack (footballer, born 1955), Scottish football player and manager
- John McCormack (footballer, born 1965), Scottish football player
- John McCormack (Irish footballer) (fl. 1970s–1980s)
- John McCormack (racing driver) (fl. 1970s), Australian
- John McCormack (baseball) (fl. 1980s-2010s), American college baseball coach

== Others ==
- John MacCormac (1791–1865), Irish timber merchant
- Count John McCormack (tenor) (1884–1945), Irish tenor
- John W. McCormack (1891–1980), politician from Massachusetts, Speaker of the House of Representatives, 1962–1971
- John Edward McCormack (1917–1953), lawyer and political figure in Saskatchewan
- John McCormack (bishop) (1921–1996), Catholic bishop of the Diocese of Meath, Ireland
- John Brendan McCormack (1935–2021), Catholic bishop of the Diocese of Manchester, New Hampshire
- John McCormack (Ohio politician) (born 1944/1945), former member of the Ohio House of Representatives
- John McCormack (journalist), American political journalist

== See also ==
- Jack McCormack (disambiguation)
- John McCormick (disambiguation)
