= 2021 Chicago Bears season =

102nd season in franchise history

- Owner: Virginia Halas McCaskey
- General manager: Ryan Pace
- Head coach: Matt Nagy; Chris Tabor (Acting HC for Week 8 after Nagy tested positive for COVID-19)
- Home stadium: Soldier Field

Results
- Record: 6–11
- Division place: 3rd NFC North
- Playoffs: Did not qualify
- All-Pros: 3: DE Robert Quinn (2nd team); LB Roquan Smith (2nd team); PR Jakeem Grant (2nd team)
- Pro Bowlers: 2: OLB Robert Quinn; RS Jakeem Grant

Uniform
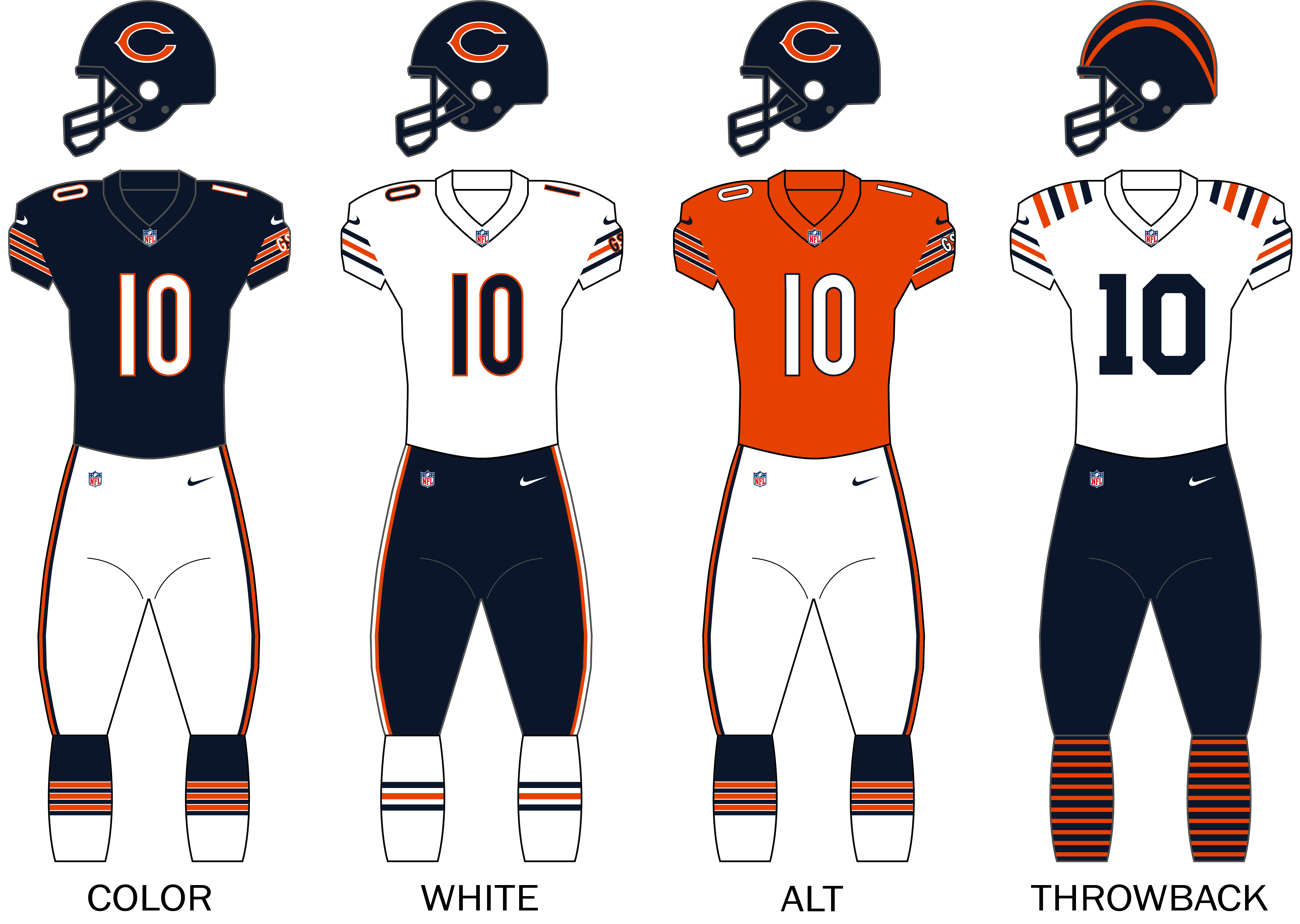

The 2021 season was the Chicago Bears' 102nd season in the National Football League (NFL), their 103rd overall, and their fourth and final under head coach Matt Nagy. This was the first season under the NFL's new 17-game schedule.

The Bears finished 6–11, failing to improve upon their 8–8 record from the previous year, causing them to suffer their first losing season since 2017, and failed to return to the playoffs. Nagy along with general manager Ryan Pace were fired on January 10, 2022.

== Draft ==
2021 Chicago Bears Draft
Round	Selection	Player	Position	College
1	11	Justin Fields	QB	Ohio State
2	39	Teven Jenkins	OT	Oklahoma State
5	151	Larry Borom	OL	Missouri
6	217	Khalil Herbert	RB	Virginia Tech
6	221	Dazz Newsome	WR	North Carolina
6	228	Thomas Graham Jr.	CB	Oregon
7	250	Khyiris Tonga	DT	BYU

Notes

- The Bears traded their first-round selection (20th overall) and their fifth-round selection (164th overall) as well as their 2022 first and fourth-round selections to the New York Giants in exchange for a first-round selection (11th overall).
- The Bears traded their second-round selection (52nd overall), third-round selection (83rd overall) and sixth-round selection (204th overall) to the Carolina Panthers in exchange for a second-round selection (39th overall) and a fifth-round selection (151st overall).
- The Bears traded their fourth-round selection to the Minnesota Vikings in exchange for a 2020 fifth-round selection.
- The Bears acquired a conditional seventh-round selection, which could be upgraded to a sixth-rounder, in a trade that sent tight end Adam Shaheen to the Miami Dolphins and the pick ended up becoming a sixth-round selection (208th overall).
- The Bears traded their sixth-round selection (208th overall) to the Seattle Seahawks in exchange for 2020 sixth-round (217th overall) and seventh-round (250th overall) selections.

== Staff ==
2021 Chicago Bears staff
Front office: Secretary of the board of directors – Virginia Halas McCaskey; Chairman – George McCaskey; President/CEO – Ted Phillips; General manager – Ryan Pace; Senior vice president/general counsel – Cliff Stein; Director of player personnel – Josh Lucas; Assistant director of player personnel – Champ Kelly; Director of college scouting – Mark Sadowski; Director of football administration – Joey Laine; Head coaches: Head coach – Matt Nagy; Offensive coaches: Offensive coordinator – Bill Lazor; Pass game coordinator/quarterbacks – John DeFilippo; Running backs – Michael Pitre; Wide receivers – Mike Furrey; Assistant wide receivers – Chris Jackson; Tight ends – Clancy Barone; Offensive line – Juan Castillo; Offensive assistant – Mike Harris; Offensive quality control – Henry Burris; Offensive quality control/assistant quarterbacks – Mike Snyder; Offensive analyst/special projects – Tom Herman	Defensive coaches: Defensive coordinator – Sean Desai; Defensive line – Chris Rumph; Outside linebackers – Bill Shuey; Inside linebackers – Bill McGovern; Secondary – Deshea Townsend; Assistant defensive backs – Mike Adams; Senior defensive assistant – Mike Pettine; Defensive quality control – Shane Toub; Defensive quality control – Ronell Williams; Special teams coaches: Special teams coordinator – Chris Tabor; Assistant special teams – Brian Ginn; Strength and conditioning: Strength and conditioning – Jason Loscalzo; Assistant strength and conditioning – Anthony Hibbert; Assistant strength and conditioning – Casey Kramer; Head athletic trainer – Andre Tucker

== Final roster ==
2021 Chicago Bears roster
Quarterbacks (QB): 14 Andy Dalton; 9 Nick Foles; Running backs (RB): 24 Khalil Herbert; 32 David Montgomery; 35 Ryan Nall; 8 Damien Williams; Wide receivers (WR): 10 Damiere Byrd; 84 Marquise Goodwin; 11 Darnell Mooney; 83 Dazz Newsome; 12 Allen Robinson; Tight ends (TE): 80 Jimmy Graham; 81 J. P. Holtz; 18 Jesse James; 85 Cole Kmet	Offensive linemen (OL): 64 Alex Bars G/C; 75 Larry Borom T; 68 James Daniels G; 74 Germain Ifedi T; 76 Teven Jenkins T/G; 67 Sam Mustipher C; 71 Jason Peters T; 73 Lachavious Simmons T; 65 Cody Whitehair G; 70 Elijah Wilkinson T; Defensive linemen (DL): 9O Angelo Blackson DE; 97 Mario Edwards Jr. DE; 91 Eddie Goldman NT; 96 Akiem Hicks DE; 93 Margus Hunt DE; 98 Bilal Nichols DE; 95 Khyiris Tonga NT	Linebackers (LB): 99 Trevis Gipson OLB; 55 Bruce Irvin OLB; 45 Joel Iyiegbuniwe ILB; 92 Caleb Johnson ILB; 57 Christian Jones OLB; 46 Sam Kamara OLB; 44 Alec Ogletree ILB; 94 Robert Quinn OLB; 58 Roquan Smith ILB; Defensive backs (DB): 25 Artie Burns CB; 26 Deon Bush SS; 23 Marqui Christian FS; 38 Tashaun Gipson SS; 27 Thomas Graham Jr. CB; 4 Eddie Jackson FS; 33 Jaylon Johnson CB; 20 Duke Shelley CB; 22 Kindle Vildor CB; Special teams (ST): 16 Pat O'Donnell P; 2 Cairo Santos K; 48 Patrick Scales LS	Practice squad: 13 Rodney Adams WR; 78 Auzoyah Alufohai NT; 19 Isaiah Coulter WR; 50 John Daka ILB; 60 Dieter Eiselen G; 53 Arlington Hambright G; 31 Michael Joseph CB; 39 BoPete Keyes CB; 63 LaCale London DE; 43 Ledarius Mack OLB; 47 Ben Mason FB; 30 Stanford Samuels III CB; 49 Charles Snowden OLB (COVID-19); 15 Nsimba Webster WR; 72 Tyrone Wheatley Jr. T; 19 Ryan Willis QB; Reserve: 50 Jeremiah Attaochu OLB (IR); 29 Tarik Cohen RB (IR); 21 Xavier Crawford CB (IR); 1 Justin Fields QB (COVID-19); 17 Jakeem Grant WR (IR); 87 Jesper Horsted TE (IR); 36 DeAndre Houston-Carson SS (IR); 52 Khalil Mack OLB (IR); 59 Cassius Marsh OLB (IR); 37 Teez Tabor FS (IR); 6 Danny Trevathan ILB (IR); Rookies in italics 53 active, 11 reserve, 15 practice squad (1 exempt)

== Preseason ==
Week	Date	Opponent	Result	Record	Venue	Recap
1	August 14	Miami Dolphins	W 20–13	1–0	Soldier Field	Recap
2	August 21	Buffalo Bills	L 15–41	1–1	Soldier Field	Recap
3	August 28	at Tennessee Titans	W 27–24	2–1	Nissan Stadium	Recap

== Regular season ==
=== Schedule ===
The Bears' 2021 schedule was announced on May 12. The Bears alternated home and away games every game of the season, becoming first team to do so in a 17-game season and the fifth since the NFL season expanded to 16 games in 1978.

Week	Date	Opponent	Result	Record	Venue	Recap
1	September 12	at Los Angeles Rams	**L** 14–34	0–1	SoFi Stadium	Recap
2	September 19	Cincinnati Bengals	**W** 20–17	1–1	Soldier Field	Recap
3	September 26	at Cleveland Browns	**L** 6–26	1–2	FirstEnergy Stadium	Recap
4	October 3	**Detroit Lions**	**W** 24–14	2–2	Soldier Field	Recap
5	October 10	at Las Vegas Raiders	**W** 20–9	3–2	Allegiant Stadium	Recap
6	October 17	**Green Bay Packers**	**L** 14–24	3–3	Soldier Field	Recap
7	October 24	at Tampa Bay Buccaneers	**L** 3–38	3–4	Raymond James Stadium	Recap
8	October 31	San Francisco 49ers	**L** 22–33	3–5	Soldier Field	Recap
9	November 8	at Pittsburgh Steelers	**L** 27–29	3–6	Heinz Field	Recap
10	Bye					
11	November 21	Baltimore Ravens	**L** 13–16	3–7	Soldier Field	Recap
12	November 25	at **Detroit Lions**	**W** 16–14	4–7	Ford Field	Recap
13	December 5	Arizona Cardinals	**L** 22–33	4–8	Soldier Field	Recap
14	December 12	at **Green Bay Packers**	**L** 30–45	4–9	Lambeau Field	Recap
15	December 20	**Minnesota Vikings**	**L** 9–17	4–10	Soldier Field	Recap
16	December 26	at Seattle Seahawks	**W** 25–24	5–10	Lumen Field	Recap
17	January 2	New York Giants	**W** 29–3	6–10	Soldier Field	Recap
18	January 9	at **Minnesota Vikings**	**L** 17–31	6–11	U.S. Bank Stadium	Recap
Note: Intra-division opponents are in **bold** text.

=== Game summaries ===
==== Week 1: at Los Angeles Rams ====
Week 1: Chicago Bears at Los Angeles Rams – Game summary

Quarter	1	2	3	4	Total
Bears	0	7	7	0	**14**
**Rams**	10	3	14	7	**34**

at SoFi Stadium, Inglewood, California

- Date: September 12
- Game time: 7:20 p.m. CDT/5:20 p.m. PDT
- Game weather: Sunny, 71 °F (22 °C)
- Game attendance: 70,445
- Referee: Brad Allen
- TV announcers (NBC): Al Michaels, Cris Collinsworth, Michele Tafoya and Terry McAulay
- Recap, Game Book

Game information

**First quarter**

- LAR – Van Jefferson 67-yard pass from Matthew Stafford (Matt Gay kick), 6:30. Rams 7–0. **Drive: 3 plays, 80 yards, 1:18.**
- LAR – Matt Gay 53-yard field goal, 4:39. Rams 10–0. **Drive: 6 plays, 24 yards, 2:38.**

**Second quarter**

- LAR – Matt Gay 22-yard field goal, 11:39. Rams 13–0. **Drive: 10 plays, 54 yards, 4:35.**
- CHI – David Montgomery 3-yard run (Cairo Santos kick), 0:34. Rams 13–7. **Drive: 9 plays, 55 yards, 4:08.**

**Third quarter**

- LAR – Cooper Kupp 56-yard pass from Matthew Stafford (Matt Gay kick), 13:52. Rams 20–7. **Drive: 4 plays, 75 yards, 1:08.**
- CHI – Justin Fields 3-yard run (Cairo Santos kick), 4:14. Rams 20–14. **Drive: 16 plays, 81 yards, 9:38.**
- LAR – Darrell Henderson 1-yard run (Matt Gay kick), 1:19. Rams 27–14. **Drive: 8 plays, 75 yards, 2:55.**

**Fourth quarter**

- LAR – Robert Woods 2-yard pass from Matthew Stafford (Matt Gay kick), 3:17. Rams 34–14. **Drive: 12 plays, 70 yards, 6:44.**

**Top passers**

- CHI – Andy Dalton – 27/38, 206 yards, INT
- LAR – Matthew Stafford – 20/26, 321 yards, 3 TD

**Top rushers**

- CHI – David Montgomery – 16 rushes, 108 yards, TD
- LAR – Darrell Henderson – 16 rushes, 70 yards, TD

**Top receivers**

- CHI – Marquise Goodwin – 4 receptions, 45 yards
- LAR – Cooper Kupp – 7 receptions, 108 yards, TD

==== Week 2: vs. Cincinnati Bengals ====
Week 2: Cincinnati Bengals at Chicago Bears – Game summary

Quarter	1	2	3	4	Total
Bengals	0	0	3	14	**17**
**Bears**	7	0	0	13	**20**

at Soldier Field, Chicago, Illinois

- Date: September 19
- Game time: 12:00 p.m. CDT
- Game weather: Sunny, 81 °F (27 °C)
- Game attendance: 60,840
- Referee: Land Clark
- TV announcers (Fox): Kevin Kugler, Mark Sanchez and Laura Okmin
- Recap, Game Book

Game information

**First quarter**

- CHI – Allen Robinson 11-yard pass from Andy Dalton (Cairo Santos kick), 9:58. Bears 7–0. **Drive: 9 plays, 75 yards, 5:02.**

**Second quarter**

- No scoring plays.

**Third quarter**

- CIN – Evan McPherson 53-yard field goal, 8:22. Bears 7–3. **Drive: 11 plays, 43 yards, 6:38.**

**Fourth quarter**

- CHI – Cairo Santos 28-yard field goal, 14:52. Bears 10–3. **Drive: 8 plays, 29 yards, 4:56.**
- CHI – Roquan Smith 53-yard interception return (Cairo Santos kick), 10:55. Bears 17–3.
- CHI – Cairo Santos 22-yard field goal, 6:40. Bears 20–3. **Drive: 4 plays, 5 yards, 1:26.**
- CIN – Ja'Marr Chase 42-yard pass from Joe Burrow (Evan McPherson kick), 4:39. Bears 20–10. **Drive: 6 plays, 75 yards, 2:01.**
- CIN – Tee Higgins 7-yard pass from Joe Burrow (Evan McPherson kick), 3:39. Bears 20–17. **Drive: 1 play, 7 yards, 0:04.**

**Top passers**

- CIN – Joe Burrow – 19/30, 207 yards, 2 TD, 3 INT
- CHI – Justin Fields – 6/13, 60 yards, INT

**Top rushers**

- CIN – Joe Mixon – 20 rushes, 69 yards
- CHI – David Montgomery – 20 rushes, 61 yards

**Top receivers**

- CIN – Tyler Boyd – 7 receptions, 73 yards
- CHI – Darnell Mooney – 6 receptions, 66 yards

==== Week 3: at Cleveland Browns ====
Week 3: Chicago Bears at Cleveland Browns – Game summary

Quarter	1	2	3	4	Total
Bears	3	0	3	0	**6**
**Browns**	0	10	3	13	**26**

at FirstEnergy Stadium, Cleveland, Ohio

- Date: September 26
- Game time: 1:00 p.m. EDT/12:00 p.m. CDT
- Game weather: Sunny, 68 °F (20 °C)
- Game attendance: 67,431
- Referee: Ronald Torbert
- TV announcers (Fox): Kevin Burkhardt, Greg Olsen and Pam Oliver
- Recap, Game Book

Game information

**First quarter**

- CHI - Cairo Santos 47-yard field goal, 8:40. Bears 3–0. **Drive: 5 plays, 24 yards, 2:46.**

**Second quarter**

- CLE - Chase McLaughlin 57-yard field goal, 12:31. Tied 3–3. **Drive: 8 plays, 38 yards, 4:32.**
- CLE - Austin Hooper 13-yard pass from Baker Mayfield (Chase McLaughlin kick), 0:19. Browns 10–3. **Drive: 12 plays, 89 yards, 2:35.**

**Third quarter**

- CLE - Chase McLaughlin 41-yard field goal, 9:32. Browns 13–3. **Drive: 7 plays, 21 yards, 4:26.**
- CHI - Cairo Santos 22-yard field goal, 1:43. Browns 13–6. **Drive: 9 plays, 65 yards, 4:02.**

**Fourth quarter**

- CLE - Kareem Hunt 29-yard run (Chase McLaughlin kick), 14:46. Browns 20–6. **Drive: 6 plays, 75 yards, 1:57.**
- CLE - Chase McLaughlin 52-yard field goal, 10:40. Browns 23–6. **Drive: 6 plays, 37 yards, 3:00.**
- CLE - Chase McLaughlin 28-yard field goal, 3:43. Browns 26–6. **Drive: 10 plays, 41 yards, 5:35.**

**Top passers**

- CHI – Justin Fields – 6/20, 68 yards
- CLE – Baker Mayfield – 19/31, 246 yards, TD

**Top rushers**

- CHI – David Montgomery – 10 rushes, 34 yards
- CLE – Nick Chubb – 22 rushes, 84 yards

**Top receivers**

- CHI – Allen Robinson – 2 receptions, 27 yards
- CLE – Odell Beckham Jr. – 5 receptions, 77 yards

==== Week 4: vs. Detroit Lions ====
Week 4: Detroit Lions at Chicago Bears – Game summary

Quarter	1	2	3	4	Total
Lions	0	0	7	7	**14**
**Bears**	7	7	10	0	**24**

at Soldier Field, Chicago, Illinois

- Date: October 3
- Game time: 12:00 p.m. CDT
- Game weather: Mostly cloudy, 72 °F (22 °C)
- Game attendance: 61,468
- Referee: Shawn Smith
- TV announcers (Fox): Gus Johnson, Aqib Talib and Megan Olivi
- Recap, Game Book

Game information

**First quarter**

- CHI – David Montgomery 4-yard run (Cairo Santos kick), 8:49. Bears 7–0. **Drive: 12 plays, 75 yards, 6:11.**

**Second quarter**

- CHI – David Montgomery 9-yard run (Cairo Santos kick), 14:51. Bears 14–0. **Drive: 6 plays, 89 yards, 2:53.**

**Third quarter**

- CHI – Damien Williams 4-yard run (Cairo Santos kick), 10:33. Bears 21–0. **Drive: 6 plays, 77 yards, 2:49.**
- DET – Kalif Raymond 4-yard pass from Jared Goff (Ryan Santoso kick), 3:19. Bears 21–7. **Drive: 6 plays, 44 yards, 3:22.**
- CHI – Cairo Santos 33-yard field goal, 0:10. Bears 24–7. **Drive: 7 plays, 60 yards, 3:09.**

**Fourth quarter**

- DET – Kalif Raymond 25-yard pass from Jared Goff (Ryan Santoso kick), 11:17. Bears 24–14. **Drive: 8 plays, 75 yards, 3:53.**

**Top passers**

- DET – Jared Goff – 24/38, 298 yards, 2 TD
- CHI – Justin Fields – 12/18, 215 yards, INT

**Top rushers**

- DET – Jamaal Williams – 14 rushes, 66 yards
- CHI – David Montgomery – 23 rushes, 106 yards, 2 TD

**Top receivers**

- DET – Quintez Cephus – 4 receptions, 83 yards
- CHI – Darnell Mooney – 5 receptions, 125 yards

==== Week 5: at Las Vegas Raiders ====
Week 5: Chicago Bears at Las Vegas Raiders – Game summary

Quarter	1	2	3	4	Total
**Bears**	0	14	0	6	**20**
Raiders	3	0	0	6	**9**

at Allegiant Stadium, Paradise, Nevada

- Date: October 10
- Game time: 3:05 p.m. CDT/1:05 p.m. PDT
- Game weather: None (indoor stadium)
- Game attendance: 76,234
- Referee: Craig Wrolstad
- TV announcers (CBS): Ian Eagle, Charles Davis and Evan Washburn
- Recap, Game Book

Game information

**First quarter**

- LV – Daniel Carlson 31-yard field goal, 4:00. Raiders 3–0. **Drive: 13 plays, 69 yards, 6:08.**

**Second quarter**

- CHI – Jesper Horsted 2-yard pass from Justin Fields (Cairo Santos kick), 13:11. Bears 7–3. **Drive: 10 plays, 72 yards, 5:49.**
- CHI – Damien Williams 4-yard run (Cairo Santos kick), 1:56. Bears 14–3. **Drive: 16 plays, 86 yards, 8:17.**

**Third quarter**

- No scoring plays

**Fourth quarter**

- LV – Josh Jacobs 1-yard run (pass failed), 9:01. Bears 14–9. **Drive: 16 plays, 74 yards, 8:19.**
- CHI – Cairo Santos 46-yard field goal, 2:45. Bears 17–9. **Drive: 10 plays, 57 yards, 6:16.**
- CHI – Cairo Santos 46-yard field goal, 0:56. Bears 20–9. **Drive: 4 plays, 2 yards, 0:59.**

**Top passers**

- CHI – Justin Fields – 12/20, 111 yards, TD
- LV – Derek Carr – 22/35, 206 yards, INT

**Top rushers**

- CHI – Khalil Herbert – 18 rushes, 75 yards
- LV – Josh Jacobs – 15 rushes, 48 yards, TD

**Top receivers**

- CHI – Darnell Mooney – 3 receptions, 35 yards
- LV – Hunter Renfrow – 6 receptions, 56 yards

==== Week 6: vs. Green Bay Packers ====
Week 6: Green Bay Packers at Chicago Bears – Game summary

Quarter	1	2	3	4	Total
**Packers**	0	10	7	7	**24**
Bears	7	0	0	7	**14**

at Soldier Field, Chicago, Illinois

- Date: October 17
- Game time: 12:00 p.m. CDT
- Game weather: Sunny, 62 °F (17 °C)
- Game attendance: 62,332
- Referee: Brad Rogers
- TV announcers (Fox): Joe Davis, Greg Olsen and Pam Oliver
- Recap, Game Book

Game information

**First quarter**

- CHI – Khalil Herbert 1-yard run (Cairo Santos kick), 6:45. Bears 7–0. **Drive: 8 plays, 80 yards, 4:24.**

**Second quarter**

- GB – Allen Lazard 1-yard pass from Aaron Rodgers (Mason Crosby kick), 9:59. Tied 7–7. **Drive: 12 plays, 80 yards, 6:14.**
- GB – Mason Crosby 39-yard field goal, 4:09. Packers 10–7. **Drive: 7 plays, 38 yards, 3:54.**

**Third quarter**

- GB – Aaron Jones 12-yard pass from Aaron Rodgers (Mason Crosby kick), 6:00. Packers 17–7. **Drive: 10 plays, 90 yards, 6:54.**

**Fourth quarter**

- CHI – Darnell Mooney 5-yard pass from Justin Fields (Cairo Santos kick), 8:44. Packers 17–14. **Drive: 10 plays, 80 yards, 6:16.**
- GB – Aaron Rodgers 6-yard run (Mason Crosby kick), 4:30. Packers 24–14. **Drive: 7 plays, 75 yards, 4:14.**

**Top passers**

- GB – Aaron Rodgers – 17/23, 195 yards, 2 TD
- CHI – Justin Fields – 16/27, 174 yards, TD, INT

**Top rushers**

- GB – Aaron Jones – 13 rushes, 76 yards
- CHI – Khalil Herbert – 19 rushes, 97 yards, TD

**Top receivers**

- GB – Davante Adams – 4 receptions, 89 yards
- CHI – Allen Robinson – 4 receptions, 53 yards

==== Week 7: at Tampa Bay Buccaneers ====
Week 7: Chicago Bears at Tampa Bay Buccaneers – Game summary

Quarter	1	2	3	4	Total
Bears	0	3	0	0	**3**
**Buccaneers**	21	14	0	3	**38**

at Raymond James Stadium, Tampa, Florida

- Date: October 24
- Game time: 4:25 p.m. EDT/3:25 p.m. CDT
- Game weather: Rain, 76 °F (24 °C)
- Game attendance: 65,635
- Referee: Alex Kemp
- TV announcers (CBS): Jim Nantz, Tony Romo, Tracy Wolfson and Gene Steratore
- Recap, Game Book

Game information

**First quarter**

- TB – Leonard Fournette 2-yard run (Ryan Succop kick), 11:58. Buccaneers 7–0. **Drive: 2 plays, 32 yards, 0:51.**
- TB – Chris Godwin 4-yard pass from Tom Brady (Ryan Succop kick), 4:37. Buccaneers 14–0. **Drive: 6 plays, 40 yards, 2:36.**
- TB – Mike Evans 9-yard pass from Tom Brady (Ryan Succop kick), 0:06. Buccaneers 21–0. **Drive: 5 plays, 35 yards, 2:01.**

**Second quarter**

- CHI – Cairo Santos 28-yard field goal, 6:08. Buccaneers 21–3. **Drive: 10 plays, 57 yards, 3:53.**
- TB – Mike Evans 2-yard pass from Tom Brady (Ryan Succop kick), 3:35. Buccaneers 28–3. **Drive: 5 plays, 75 yards, 2:33.**
- TB – Mike Evans 8-yard pass from Tom Brady (Ryan Succop kick), 0:09. Buccaneers 35–3. **Drive: 10 plays, 48 yards, 1:45.**

**Third quarter**

- No scoring plays.

**Fourth quarter**

- TB – Ryan Succop 22-yard field goal, 12:51. Buccaneers 38–3. **Drive: 6 plays, 33 yards, 2:02.**

**Top passers**

- CHI – Justin Fields – 22/32, 184 yards, 3 INT
- TB – Tom Brady – 20/36, 211 yards, 4 TD

**Top rushers**

- CHI – Khalil Herbert – 18 rushes, 100 yards
- TB – Leonard Fournette – 15 rushes, 81 yards, TD

**Top receivers**

- CHI – Cole Kmet – 5 receptions, 43 yards
- TB – Chris Godwin – 8 receptions, 111 yards, TD

==== Week 8: vs. San Francisco 49ers ====
Week 8: San Francisco 49ers at Chicago Bears – Game summary

Quarter	1	2	3	4	Total
**49ers**	3	6	6	18	**33**
Bears	3	10	3	6	**22**

at Soldier Field, Chicago, Illinois

- Date: October 31
- Game time: 12:00 p.m. CDT
- Game weather: Partly sunny, 52 °F (11 °C)
- Game attendance: 60,877
- Referee: Land Clark
- TV announcers (Fox): Adam Amin, Greg Olsen and Pam Oliver
- Recap, Game Book

Game information

**First quarter**

- CHI – Cairo Santos 39-yard field goal, 4:38. Bears 3–0. **Drive: 9 plays, 41 yards, 5:10.**
- SF – Joey Slye 48-yard field goal, 2:51. Tied 3–3. **Drive: 6 plays, 45 yards, 1:47.**

**Second quarter**

- CHI – Jesse James 8-yard pass from Justin Fields (Cairo Santos kick), 12:03. Bears 10–3. **Drive: 11 plays, 74 yards, 5:48.**
- SF – Joey Slye 52-yard field goal, 9:33. Bears 10–6. **Drive: 7 plays, 41 yards, 2:30.**
- CHI – Cairo Santos 40-yard field goal, 1:16. Bears 13–6. **Drive: 16 plays, 57 yards, 8:17.**
- SF – Joey Slye 22-yard field goal, 0:00. Bears 13–9. **Drive: 7 plays, 71 yards, 1:16.**

**Third quarter**

- CHI – Cairo Santos 25-yard field goal, 8:33. Bears 16–9. **Drive: 13 plays, 62 yards, 6:27.**
- SF – Jimmy Garoppolo 2-yard run (kick failed, wide right), 5:56. Bears 16–15. **Drive: 7 plays, 75 yards, 2:37.**

**Fourth quarter**

- SF – Elijah Mitchell 5-yard run (Jimmy Garoppolo–Brandon Aiyuk pass), 14:11. 49ers 23–16. **Drive: 6 plays, 52 yards, 2:49.**
- CHI – Justin Fields 22-yard run (kick failed, wide right), 9:32. 49ers 23–22. **Drive: 9 plays, 68 yards, 4:39.**
- SF – Jimmy Garoppolo 5-yard run (Joey Slye kick), 6:34. 49ers 30–22. **Drive: 5 plays, 75 yards, 2:58.**
- SF – Joey Slye 32-yard field goal, 1:56. 49ers 33–22. **Drive: 7 plays, 49 yards, 2:28.**

**Top passers**

- SF – Jimmy Garoppolo – 17/28, 322 yards
- CHI – Justin Fields – 19/27, 175 yards, TD, INT

**Top rushers**

- SF – Elijah Mitchell – 18 rushes, 137 yards, TD
- CHI – Justin Fields – 10 rushes, 103 yards, TD

**Top receivers**

- SF – Deebo Samuel – 6 receptions, 171 yards
- CHI – Darnell Mooney – 6 receptions, 64 yards

==== Week 9: at Pittsburgh Steelers ====
Week 9: Chicago Bears at Pittsburgh Steelers – Game summary

Quarter	1	2	3	4	Total
Bears	0	3	3	21	**27**
**Steelers**	7	7	6	9	**29**

at Heinz Field, Pittsburgh, Pennsylvania

- Date: November 8
- Game time: 8:15 p.m. EST/7:15 p.m. CST
- Game weather: Clear, 55 °F (13 °C)
- Game attendance: 60,788
- Referee: Tony Corrente
- TV announcers (ESPN): Steve Levy, Brian Griese, Louis Riddick and Lisa Salters
- Recap, Game Book

Game information

**First quarter**

- PIT – Najee Harris 10-yard run (Chris Boswell kick), 9:42. Steelers 7–0. **Drive: 6 plays, 59 yards, 3:20.**

**Second quarter**

- PIT – Pat Freiermuth 4-yard pass from Ben Roethlisberger (Chris Boswell kick), 13:22. Steelers 14–0. **Drive: 9 plays, 36 yards, 3:41.**
- CHI – Cairo Santos 30-yard field goal, 0:15. Steelers 14–3. **Drive: 12 plays, 52 yards, 4:32.**

**Third quarter**

- CHI – Cairo Santos 22-yard field goal, 7:43. Steelers 14–6. **Drive: 10 plays, 89 yards, 4:59.**
- PIT – Pat Freiermuth 10-yard pass from Ben Roethlisberger (kick failed), 2:08. Steelers 20–6. **Drive: 9 plays, 75 yards, 5:35.**

**Fourth quarter**

- CHI – Darnell Mooney 15-yard run (Cairo Santos kick), 14:17. Steelers 20–13. **Drive: 6 plays, 82 yards, 2:51.**
- PIT – Chris Boswell 54-yard field goal, 11:54. Steelers 23–13. **Drive: 4 plays, 39 yards, 2:23.**
- CHI – DeAndre Houston-Carson 25-yard fumble return (Cairo Santos kick), 6:31. Steelers 23–20.
- PIT – Chris Boswell 52-yard field goal, 2:52. Steelers 26–20. **Drive: 11 plays, 41 yards, 3:39.**
- CHI – Darnell Mooney 16-yard pass from Justin Fields (Cairo Santos kick), 1:46. Bears 27–26. **Drive: 7 plays, 75 yards, 1:06.**
- PIT – Chris Boswell 40-yard field goal, 0:26. Steelers 29–27. **Drive: 7 plays, 52 yards, 1:20.**

**Top passers**

- CHI – Justin Fields – 17/29, 291 yards, TD, INT
- PIT – Ben Roethlisberger – 21/30, 205 yards, 2 TD

**Top rushers**

- CHI – David Montgomery – 13 rushes, 63 yards
- PIT – Najee Harris – 22 rushes, 62 yards, TD

**Top receivers**

- CHI – Cole Kmet – 6 receptions, 87 yards
- PIT – Diontae Johnson – 5 receptions, 56 yards

==== Week 11: vs. Baltimore Ravens ====
Week 11: Baltimore Ravens at Chicago Bears – Game summary

Quarter	1	2	3	4	Total
**Ravens**	0	6	0	10	**16**
Bears	0	0	7	6	**13**

at Soldier Field, Chicago, Illinois

- Date: November 21
- Game time: 12:00 p.m. CST
- Game weather: Mostly sunny, 43 °F (6 °C)
- Game attendance: 60,679
- Referee: Shawn Smith
- TV announcers (CBS): Jim Nantz, Tony Romo, Tracy Wolfson and Gene Steratore
- Recap, Game Book

Game information

**First quarter**

- No scoring plays.

**Second quarter**

- BAL – Justin Tucker 35-yard field goal, 2:11. Ravens 3–0. **Drive: 10 plays, 49 yards, 6:16.**
- BAL – Justin Tucker 27-yard field goal, 0:02. Ravens 6–0. **Drive: 11 plays, 55 yards, 1:05.**

**Third quarter**

- CHI – Darnell Mooney 60-yard pass from Andy Dalton (Cairo Santos kick), 8:02. Bears 7–6. **Drive: 2 plays, 83 yards, 0:44.**

**Fourth quarter**

- BAL – Justin Tucker 46-yard field goal, 3:41. Ravens 9–7. **Drive: 7 plays, 17 yards, 3:48.**
- CHI – Marquise Goodwin 49-yard pass from Andy Dalton (pass failed), 1:41. Bears 13–9. **Drive: 10 plays, 75 yards, 2:00.**
- BAL – Devonta Freeman 3-yard run (Justin Tucker kick), 0:22. Ravens 16–13. **Drive: 5 plays, 72 yards, 1:19.**

**Top passers**

- BAL – Tyler Huntley – 26/36, 219 yards, INT
- CHI – Andy Dalton – 11/23, 201 yards, 2 TD

**Top rushers**

- BAL – Devonta Freeman – 16 rushes, 49 yards, TD
- CHI – David Montgomery – 14 rushes, 58 yards

**Top receivers**

- BAL – Mark Andrews – 8 receptions, 73 yards
- CHI – Darnell Mooney – 5 receptions, 121 yards, TD

==== Week 12: at Detroit Lions ====
Thanksgiving Day games

Week 12: Chicago Bears at Detroit Lions – Game summary

Quarter	1	2	3	4	Total
**Bears**	0	13	0	3	**16**
Lions	7	0	7	0	**14**

at Ford Field, Detroit, Michigan

- Date: November 25
- Game time: 12:30 p.m. EST/11:30 a.m. CST
- Game weather: None (indoor stadium)
- Game attendance: 56,355
- Referee: Adrian Hill
- TV announcers (Fox): Joe Buck, Troy Aikman, Erin Andrews and Tom Rinaldi
- Recap, Game Book

Game information

**First quarter**

- DET – Josh Reynolds 39-yard pass from Jared Goff (Riley Patterson kick), 9:26. Lions 7–0. **Drive: 7 plays, 69 yards, 3:16.**

**Second quarter**

- CHI – Cairo Santos 28-yard field goal, 13:24. Lions 7–3. **Drive: 10 plays, 74 yards, 4:37.**
- CHI – Jimmy Graham 17-yard pass from Andy Dalton (Cairo Santos kick), 4:29. Bears 10–7. **Drive: 2 plays, 69 yards, 0:52.**
- CHI – Cairo Santos 43-yard field goal, 0:00. Bears 13–7. **Drive: 7 plays, 29 yards, 1:09.**

**Third quarter**

- DET – T. J. Hockenson 17-yard pass from Jared Goff (Riley Patterson kick), 1:46. Lions 14–13. **Drive: 7 plays, 79 yards, 3:21.**

**Fourth quarter**

- CHI – Cairo Santos 28-yard field goal, 0:00. Bears 16–14. **Drive: 18 plays, 69 yards, 8:30.**

**Top passers**

- CHI – Andy Dalton – 24/39, 317 yards, TD, INT
- DET – Jared Goff – 21/25, 171 yards, 2 TD

**Top rushers**

- CHI – David Montgomery – 17 rushes, 46 yards
- DET – Jamaal Williams – 15 rushes, 65 yards

**Top receivers**

- CHI – Darnell Mooney – 5 receptions, 123 yards
- DET – Josh Reynolds – 3 receptions, 70 yards, TD

==== Week 13: vs. Arizona Cardinals ====
Week 13: Arizona Cardinals at Chicago Bears – Game summary

Quarter	1	2	3	4	Total
**Cardinals**	14	7	3	9	**33**
Bears	0	7	7	8	**22**

at Soldier Field, Chicago, Illinois

- Date: December 5
- Game time: 12:00 p.m. CST
- Game weather: Cloudy, 35 °F (2 °C)
- Game attendance: 60,803
- Referee: Jerome Boger
- TV announcers (Fox): Adam Amin, Mark Schlereth and Shannon Spake
- Recap, Game Book

Game information

**First quarter**

- ARI – DeAndre Hopkins 20-yard pass from Kyler Murray (Matt Prater kick), 10:55. Cardinals 7–0. **Drive: 4 plays, 28 yards, 2:40.**
- ARI – Kyler Murray 9-yard run (Matt Prater kick), 1:39. Cardinals 14–0. **Drive: 5 plays, 15 yards, 2:12.**

**Second quarter**

- CHI – David Montgomery 1-yard run (Cairo Santos kick), 8:50. Cardinals 14–7. **Drive: 13 plays, 77 yards, 7:49.**
- ARI – James Conner 23-yard pass from Kyler Murray (Matt Prater kick), 5:40. Cardinals 21–7. **Drive: 7 plays, 74 yards, 3:10.**

**Third quarter**

- ARI – Matt Prater 33-yard field goal, 9:52. Cardinals 24–7. **Drive: 9 plays, 51 yards, 5:08.**
- CHI – Jimmy Graham 1-yard pass from Andy Dalton (Cairo Santos kick), 2:49. Cardinals 24–14. **Drive: 13 plays, 73 yards, 7:03.**

**Fourth quarter**

- ARI – Matt Prater 25-yard field goal, 8:31. Cardinals 27–14. **Drive: 6 plays, 21 yards, 3:05.**
- ARI – Kyler Murray 3-yard run (pass failed), 6:23. Cardinals 33–14. **Drive: 2 plays, 12 yards, 0:45.**
- CHI – Jakeem Grant 8-yard pass from Andy Dalton (Andy Dalton–Jimmy Graham pass), 2:45. Cardinals 33–22. **Drive: 12 plays, 75 yards, 3:38.**

**Top passers**

- ARI – Kyler Murray – 11/15, 123 yards, 2 TD
- CHI – Andy Dalton – 26/41, 229 yards, 2 TD, 4 INT

**Top rushers**

- ARI – James Conner – 20 runs, 75 yards
- CHI – David Montgomery – 21 rushes, 90 yards, TD

**Top receivers**

- ARI – James Conner – 2 receptions, 36 yards, TD
- CHI – Jakeem Grant – 5 receptions, 62 yards, TD

==== Week 14: at Green Bay Packers ====
Week 14: Chicago Bears at Green Bay Packers – Game summary

Quarter	1	2	3	4	Total
Bears	3	24	0	3	**30**
**Packers**	0	21	17	7	**45**

at Lambeau Field, Green Bay, Wisconsin

- Date: December 12
- Game time: 7:20 p.m. CST
- Game weather: Cloudy, 37 °F (3 °C)
- Game attendance: 78,273
- Referee: Ronald Torbert
- TV announcers (NBC): Al Michaels, Cris Collinsworth, Kathryn Tappen and Terry McAulay
- Recap, Game Book

Game information

**First quarter**

- CHI – Cairo Santos 23-yard field goal, 4:21. Bears 3–0. **Drive: 10 plays, 39 yards, 4:47.**

**Second quarter**

- CHI – Jakeem Grant 46-yard pass from Justin Fields (Cairo Santos kick), 11:09. Bears 10–0. **Drive: 6 plays, 89 yards, 3:41.**
- GB – Allen Lazard 2-yard pass from Aaron Rodgers (Mason Crosby kick), 6:02. Bears 10–7. **Drive: 11 plays, 75 yards, 5:07.**
- GB – Rasul Douglas 55-yard interception return (Mason Crosby kick), 4:59. Packers 14–10.
- CHI – Damiere Byrd 54-yard pass from Justin Fields (Cairo Santos kick), 3:21. Bears 17–14. **Drive: 3 plays, 60 yards, 1:38.**
- CHI – Jakeem Grant 97-yard punt return (Cairo Santos kick), 1:32. Bears 24–14.
- GB – Davante Adams 38-yard pass from Aaron Rodgers (Mason Crosby kick), 0:44. Bears 24–21. **Drive: 4 plays, 75 yards, 0:48.**
- CHI – Cairo Santos 44-yard field goal, 0:00. Bears 27–21. **Drive: 6 plays, 32 yards, 0:44.**

**Third quarter**

- GB – Aaron Jones 3-yard run (Mason Crosby kick), 9:24. Packers 28–27. **Drive: 9 plays, 75 yards, 5:36.**
- GB – Aaron Jones 23-yard pass from Aaron Rodgers (Mason Crosby kick), 8:24. Packers 35–27. **Drive: 1 play, 23 yards, 0:08.**
- GB – Mason Crosby 20-yard field goal, 2:52. Packers 38–27. **Drive: 7 plays, 46 yards, 3:45.**

**Fourth quarter**

- GB – Davante Adams 3-yard pass from Aaron Rodgers (Mason Crosby kick), 4:33. Packers 45–27. **Drive: 13 plays, 71 yards, 8:38.**
- CHI – Cairo Santos 43-yard field goal, 1:22. Packers 45–30. **Drive: 10 plays, 54 yards, 3:11.**

**Top passers**

- CHI – Justin Fields – 18/33, 224 yards, 2 TD, 2 INT
- GB – Aaron Rodgers – 29/37, 341 yards, 4 TD

**Top rushers**

- CHI – Justin Fields – 9 rushes, 74 yards
- GB – A. J. Dillon – 15 rushes, 71 yards

**Top receivers**

- CHI – Damiere Byrd – 2 receptions, 76 yards, TD
- GB – Davante Adams – 10 receptions, 121 yards, 2 TD

==== Week 15: vs. Minnesota Vikings ====
Week 15: Minnesota Vikings at Chicago Bears – Game summary

Quarter	1	2	3	4	Total
**Vikings**	7	3	7	0	**17**
Bears	0	3	0	6	**9**

at Soldier Field, Chicago, Illinois

- Date: December 20
- Game time: 7:15 p.m. CST
- Game weather: Clear, 38 °F (3 °C)
- Game attendance: 60,082
- Referee: Scott Novak
- TV announcers (ESPN): Steve Levy, Brian Griese, Louis Riddick and Lisa Salters
- Recap, Game Book

Game information

**First quarter**

- MIN – Justin Jefferson 12-yard pass from Kirk Cousins (Greg Joseph kick), 5:03. Vikings 7–0. **Drive: 8 plays, 54 yards, 4:37.**

**Second quarter**

- MIN – Greg Joseph 37-yard field goal, 13:28. Vikings 10–0. **Drive: 8 plays, 34 yards, 4:09.**
- CHI – Cairo Santos 34-yard field goal, 1:33. Vikings 10–3. **Drive: 12 plays, 49 yards, 5:55.**

**Third quarter**

- MIN – Ihmir Smith-Marsette 7-yard pass from Kirk Cousins (Greg Joseph kick), 5:51. Vikings 17–3. **Drive: 12 plays, 77 yards, 5:41.**

**Fourth quarter**

- CHI – Jesper Horsted 19-yard pass from Justin Fields, 0:00. Vikings 17–9. **Drive: 9 plays, 80 yards, 1:52.**

**Top passers**

- MIN – Kirk Cousins – 12/24, 87 yards, 2 TD, INT
- CHI – Justin Fields – 26/39, 285 yards, TD

**Top rushers**

- MIN – Dalvin Cook – 28 rushes, 89 yards
- CHI – David Montgomery – 18 rushes, 60 yards

**Top receivers**

- MIN – Justin Jefferson – 4 receptions, 47 yards, TD
- CHI – Cole Kmet – 6 receptions, 71 yards

==== Week 16: at Seattle Seahawks ====
Week 16: Chicago Bears at Seattle Seahawks – Game summary

Quarter	1	2	3	4	Total
**Bears**	0	7	7	11	**25**
Seahawks	7	10	7	0	**24**

at Lumen Field, Seattle, Washington

- Date: December 26
- Game time: 3:05 p.m. CST/1:05 p.m. PST
- Game weather: Snow, 25 °F (−4 °C)
- Game attendance: 68,492
- Referee: Carl Cheffers
- TV announcers (Fox): Aaron Goldsmith, Aqib Talib and Megan Olivi
- Recap, Game Book

Game information

**First quarter**

- SEA – DK Metcalf 41-yard pass from Russell Wilson (Jason Myers kick), 9:00. Seahawks 7–0. **Drive: 7 plays, 80 yards, 3:04.**

**Second quarter**

- CHI – David Montgomery 1-yard run (Cairo Santos kick), 10:15. Tied 7–7. **Drive: 5 plays, 15 yards, 3:25.**
- SEA – Rashaad Penny 3-yard run (Jason Myers kick), 4:47. Seahawks 14–7. **Drive: 12 plays, 74 yards, 5:28.**
- SEA – Jason Myers 36-yard field goal, 0:17. Seahawks 17–7. **Drive: 7 plays, 55 yards, 0:45.**

**Third quarter**

- CHI – Khalil Herbert 20-yard run (Cairo Santos kick), 5:30. Seahawks 17–14. **Drive: 10 plays, 82 yards, 5:27.**
- SEA – Gerald Everett 24-yard pass from Russell Wilson (Jason Myers kick), 3:32. Seahawks 24–14. **Drive: 4 plays, 61 yards, 1:58.**

**Fourth quarter**

- CHI – Cairo Santos 35-yard field goal, 10:42. Seahawks 24–17. **Drive: 13 plays, 58 yards, 7:50.**
- CHI – Jimmy Graham 15-yard pass from Nick Foles (Nick Foles–Damiere Byrd pass), 1:01. Bears 25–24. **Drive: 6 plays, 80 yards, 1:55.**

**Top passers**

- CHI – Nick Foles – 24/35, 250 yards, TD
- SEA – Russell Wilson – 16/27, 181 yards, 2 TD

**Top rushers**

- CHI – David Montgomery – 21 rushes, 45 yards, TD
- SEA – Rashaad Penny – 17 rushes, 135 yards, TD

**Top receivers**

- CHI – David Montgomery – 7 receptions, 61 yards
- SEA – Gerald Everett – 4 receptions, 68 yards, TD

==== Week 17: vs. New York Giants ====
Week 17: New York Giants at Chicago Bears – Game summary

Quarter	1	2	3	4	Total
Giants	0	3	0	0	**3**
**Bears**	14	8	7	0	**29**

at Soldier Field, Chicago, Illinois

- Date: January 2
- Game time: 12:00 p.m. CST
- Game weather: Partly cloudy, 24 °F (−4 °C)
- Game attendance: 59,594
- Referee: Shawn Hochuli
- TV announcers (CBS): Spero Dedes and Jay Feely
- Recap, Game Book

Game information

**First quarter**

- CHI – David Montgomery 2-yard run (Cairo Santos kick), 11:42. Bears 7-0. **Drive: 1 play, 2 yards, 0:03.**
- CHI – Darnell Mooney 4-yard pass from Andy Dalton (Cairo Santos kick), 8:08. Bears 14-0. **Drive: 7 plays, 24 yards, 3:39.**

**Second quarter**

- NYG – Graham Gano 38-yard field goal, 7:45. Bears 14-3. **Drive: 10 plays, 35 yards, 6:02.**
- CHI – Cairo Santos 21-yard field goal, 1:01. Bears 17-3. **Drive: 14 plays, 69 yards, 6:44.**
- CHI – Devontae Booker tackled in end zone by Angelo Blackson for a safety, 0:52. Bears 19-3.
- CHI – Cairo Santos 44-yard field goal, 0:00. Bears 22-3. **Drive: 7 plays, 39 yards, 0:52.**

**Third quarter**

- CHI – David Montgomery 2-yard run (Cairo Santos kick), 9:30. Bears 29-3. **Drive: 11 plays, 75 yards, 5:30.**

**Fourth quarter**

- No scoring plays.

**Top passers**

- NYG – Mike Glennon – 4/11, 24 yards, 2 INT
- CHI – Andy Dalton – 18/35, 173 yards, TD, INT

**Top rushers**

- NYG – Saquon Barkley – 21 rushes, 102 yards
- CHI – David Montgomery – 22 rushes, 64 yards, 2 TD

**Top receivers**

- NYG – Evan Engram – 1 reception, 12 yards
- CHI – Darnell Mooney – 7 receptions, 61 yards, TD

==== Week 18: at Minnesota Vikings ====
Week 18: Chicago Bears at Minnesota Vikings – Game summary

Quarter	1	2	3	4	Total
Bears	3	11	3	0	**17**
**Vikings**	0	3	7	21	**31**

at U.S. Bank Stadium, Minneapolis, Minnesota

- Date: January 9
- Game time: 12:00 p.m. CST
- Game weather: None (indoor stadium)
- Game attendance: 66,625
- Referee: Brad Allen
- TV announcers (Fox): Gus Johnson, Aqib Talib and Megan Olivi
- Recap, Game Book

Game information

**First quarter**

- CHI – Cairo Santos 43-yard field goal, 12:09. Bears 3–0. **Drive: 7 plays, 39 yards, 2:51.**

**Second quarter**

- CHI – Cairo Santos 46-yard field goal, 4:55. Bears 6–0. **Drive: 8 plays, 36 yards, 4:03.**
- CHI – Damien Williams 23-yard pass from Andy Dalton (Andy Dalton-Allen Robinson pass), 0:31. Bears 14–0. **Drive: 9 plays, 67 yards, 2:39.**
- MIN – Greg Joseph 39-yard field goal, 0:00. Bears 14–3. **Drive: 4 plays, 55 yards, 0:31.**

**Third quarter**

- MIN – Ihmir Smith-Marsette 44-yard pass from Kirk Cousins (Greg Joseph kick), 12:24. Bears 14–10. **Drive: 6 plays, 75 yards, 2:36.**
- CHI – Cairo Santos 42-yard field goal, 1:37. Bears 17–10. **Drive: 9 plays, 34 yards, 4:10.**

**Fourth quarter**

- MIN – Justin Jefferson 45-yard pass from Kirk Cousins (Greg Joseph kick), 13:35. Tied 17–17. **Drive: 6 plays, 75 yards, 3:02.**
- MIN – K. J. Osborn 21-yard pass from Kirk Cousins (Greg Joseph kick), 8:04. Vikings 24–17. **Drive: 6 plays, 87 yards, 2:49.**
- MIN – Patrick Peterson 66-yard interception return (Greg Joseph kick), 4:54. Vikings 31–17.

**Top passers**

- CHI – Andy Dalton – 33/48, 325 yards, TD, 2 INT
- MIN – Kirk Cousins – 14/22, 250 yards, 3 TD

**Top rushers**

- CHI – David Montgomery – 20 rushes, 72 yards
- MIN – Dalvin Cook – 14 rushes, 79 yards

**Top receivers**

- CHI – Darnell Mooney – 12 reception, 126 yards
- MIN – Justin Jefferson – 5 receptions, 107 yards, TD

=== Standings ===
==== Division ====
NFC North
	W	L	T	PCT	DIV	CONF	PF	PA	STK
^{(1)} Green Bay Packers	13	4	0	.765	4–2	9–3	450	371	L1
Minnesota Vikings	8	9	0	.471	4–2	6–6	425	426	W1
Chicago Bears	6	11	0	.353	2–4	4–8	311	407	L1
Detroit Lions	3	13	1	.206	2–4	3–9	325	467	W1

==== Conference ====
NFC
#	Team	Division	W	L	T	PCT	DIV	CONF	SOS	SOV	STK
**Division winners**
1 (Note: Green Bay finished ahead of Tampa Bay based on conference record (9–3 vs. 8–4), claiming the No. 1 seed.)	Green Bay Packers	North	13	4	0	.765	4–2	9–3	.479	.480	L1
2	Tampa Bay Buccaneers	South	13	4	0	.765	4–2	8–4	.467	.443	W3
3 (Note: Dallas claimed the No. 3 seed over LA Rams based on conference record (10–2 vs. 8–4).)	Dallas Cowboys	East	12	5	0	.706	6–0	10–2	.488	.431	W1
4	Los Angeles Rams	West	12	5	0	.706	3–3	8–4	.483	.409	L1
**Wild cards**
5	Arizona Cardinals	West	11	6	0	.647	4–2	7–5	.490	.492	L1
6	San Francisco 49ers	West	10	7	0	.588	2–4	7–5	.500	.438	W2
7 (Note: Philadelphia finished ahead of New Orleans based on head-to-head victory, claiming the 7th and final playoff spot.)	Philadelphia Eagles	East	9	8	0	.529	3–3	7–5	.469	.350	L1
**Did not qualify for the postseason**
8	New Orleans Saints	South	9	8	0	.529	4–2	7–5	.512	.516	W2
9	Minnesota Vikings	North	8	9	0	.471	4–2	6–6	.507	.434	W1
10 (Note: Washington finished ahead of Atlanta and Seattle based on head-to-head victories.)	Washington Football Team	East	7	10	0	.412	2–4	6–6	.529	.420	W1
11 (Note: Seattle finished ahead of Atlanta based on win percentage in common games (4–2 vs. 3–3 against: San Francisco, New Orleans, Jacksonville, Washington, and Detroit).)	Seattle Seahawks	West	7	10	0	.412	3–3	4–8	.519	.424	W2
12	Atlanta Falcons	South	7	10	0	.412	2–4	4–8	.472	.315	L2
13	Chicago Bears	North	6	11	0	.353	2–4	4–8	.524	.373	L1
14	Carolina Panthers	South	5	12	0	.294	2–4	3–9	.509	.412	L7
15	New York Giants	East	4	13	0	.235	1–5	3–9	.536	.485	L6
16	Detroit Lions	North	3	13	1	.206	2–4	3–9	.528	.627	W1
**Tiebreakers** (Note: When breaking ties for three or more teams under the NFL's rules, they are first broken within divisions, then comparing only the highest-ranked remaining team from each division.)
