= Ryan Pace =

American sports executive (born 1977)

Minnesota Vikings
- Title: Football advisor

Personal information
- Born: February 17, 1977 (age 49); Flower Mound, Texas, U.S.
- Listed height: 6 ft 3 in (1.91 m)
- Listed weight: 250 lb (113 kg)

Career information
- Position: Defensive end
- High school: Marcus (Flower Mound, Texas)
- College: Eastern Illinois

Career history
- New Orleans Saints (2001–2014); Operations assistant (2001); Scouting assistant (2002–2003); Professional personnel scout (2004–2006); Director of professional scouting (2007–2012); Director of player personnel (2013–2014); Chicago Bears (2015–2021) General manager; Atlanta Falcons (2022–2025); Senior personnel executive (2022); Director of player personnel (2023); Vice president of football operations & player personnel (2024–2025); Minnesota Vikings (2026–present) Football advisor

Awards and highlights
- Super Bowl champion (XLIV); Sporting News Executive of the Year (2018)

Ryan Pace (born February 17, 1977) is an American sports executive in the National Football League (NFL) who is the football advisor for the Minnesota Vikings. He served as the general manager of the Chicago Bears from 2015 to 2021. Before that, he worked in the New Orleans Saints' front office for 14 years.

== College career ==
Pace played linebacker at Edward S. Marcus High School before committing to Eastern Illinois in 1995; he had also received offers from Illinois State, North Texas, Texas State, and Western Illinois. EIU offensive line coach and recruiting coordinator Clancy Barone praised Pace for his speed and athleticism, saying he "showed good toughness on film."

At EIU, he converted to defensive end and played for the Panthers from 1996 to 1999.

== Professional career ==
=== New Orleans Saints ===
After not gaining any opportunities as a player, Pace was hired by the New Orleans Saints in 2001 as a coaching intern. Six years later, Pace became the director of pro personnel, and in 2013, became the director of player personnel. Pace was an executive in New Orleans during the team's most successful stretch in franchise history which included five playoff appearances, two NFC Championship appearances and winning Super Bowl XLIV.

=== Chicago Bears ===
In 2015, Pace was offered an interview for the general manager position by the New York Jets, but declined. He was later interviewed by the Chicago Bears for the general manager position on January 7, and was hired the next day. At 37 years of age at the time of his hiring, Pace was the youngest general manager in the NFL. To replace the fired Marc Trestman, Pace hired John Fox as the Bears' head coach. Pace's first draft as Bears general manager saw him select Kevin White in the first round. After a 3–13 season in 2016 that gave the Bears the third-overall pick in the 2017 NFL draft, Pace moved up a spot in a trade with the San Francisco 49ers to draft quarterback Mitchell Trubisky. Trubisky was the franchise's highest draft pick since 1951 and the highest it had taken a quarterback at that point. In Pace's first three years and the stretch of Fox's tenure, the Bears went 14–34, leading to Fox's firing after the 2017 season.

After Fox's firing, Pace hired Matt Nagy as Chicago's next head coach in 2018. Before the season, the Bears traded their 2019 and 2020 first round draft picks for star Oakland Raiders outside linebacker Khalil Mack and made him the highest-paid defensive player in NFL history. That year, the Bears went 12–4 to win the NFC North for the first time since 2010, while Eddie Jackson and Tarik Cohen, two fourth-round picks Pace made in 2017, were named All-Pro. Trubisky was named to the Pro Bowl as well. Pace was eventually named Executive of the Year by the Sporting News, becoming the third Bears general manager to win the award after George Halas in 1956 and Michael McCaskey in 1985.

The Bears had the 20th overall pick in the 2021 NFL draft. Pace moved up nine spots in the first round in a trade with the New York Giants to select quarterback Justin Fields. After a 6–11 2021 campaign, Pace and Nagy were fired on January 10, 2022. In seven seasons under Pace, Chicago went 48–65 with two playoff appearances (0–2 in playoff games). Following his exit, he released a statement of gratitude that described the news as "the tough part" of his occupation but he was "proud to have poured absolutely everything into making the Chicago Bears a better football team every single day".

=== Atlanta Falcons ===
On February 23, 2022, Pace was hired by the Atlanta Falcons as a senior personnel executive. The move reunited him with Falcons general manager Terry Fontenot, with whom he worked in New Orleans. On June 26, 2023, he was promoted to director of player personnel for the Falcons. He was elevated to vice president of football operations and player personnel ahead of the 2024 season.

On February 7, 2026, it was announced that the Falcons and Pace had parted ways as part of a broader restructuring.

=== Minnesota Vikings ===
On June 16, 2026, the Minnesota Vikings hired Pace in an advisor role.

== Personal life ==
The son of Michael Pace and Ginger Phillips, Pace grew up in Flower Mound, Texas, which is a suburb of Dallas. His grandfather Buck was a minor league baseball player.

He and his wife Stephanie have one daughter together.
