= John Patrick McCormick =

American journalist (born 1950)

John Patrick McCormick (born March 5, 1950), known professionally as John P. McCormick, is a former correspondent for Newsweek and the current editorial page editor for the Chicago Tribune. Before joining the Tribune, he was Newsweek's Midwest correspondent for 18 years. He was the recipient of the American Society of Newspaper Editors' 2002 Distinguished Writing Award for Editorial Writing, for his editorials on the 9/11 terrorist attacks, the Afghanistan War, the "Renaissance of Black Chicago", and efforts to sell naming rights for Soldier Field. In December 2008, he also drew considerable attention for his role in the Rod Blagojevich scandal.

== Early life and education ==
A native of Manchester, Iowa, McCormick earned a bachelor's degree in 1972 from Northwestern University, majoring in political science and journalism.

== Professional career ==
During college, McCormick worked as a night copy boy for the Chicago Daily News. He has joked that his "most noble responsibility at the Daily News was to fetch cheeseburgers for columnist Mike Royko." He began his career as a reporter and columnist at the Dubuque, Iowa Telegraph Herald.

=== Work at Newsweek ===
Around 1982, McCormick joined Newsweek as its Midwest correspondent, where he would work for the next 18 years.

For his final 13 years at Newsweek, McCormick served as the newsweekly's Chicago bureau chief. While at Newsweek, McCormick covered a variety of Midwest and national stories, including Chicago's Gangster Disciples street gang, the Tribune Company's purchase of Times Mirror Corporation, a hazing incident at Massachusetts Institute of Technology, and public housing in Chicago.

=== Career at the Chicago Tribune ===
In 2000, McCormick joined the Chicago Tribune.

McCormick is not to be confused with another Chicago Tribune editorial employee, reporter John D. McCormick, who covered the campaign of Barack Obama.

=== Awards for Editorial Writing ===
McCormick received the American Society of Newspaper Editors 2002 Distinguished Writing Award for Editorial Writing, for his editorials on the 9/11 terrorist attacks, the Afghanistan War, the "Renaissance of Black Chicago", and plans for a new football stadium in Chicago. And in 2003, he received the Scripps Howard Foundation's Walker Stone Award for a series entitled "Homicide: The Chicago Crime' Also in 2003, McCormick was also featured by Poynter Online in its series on "Best Newspaper Writing".

== Rod Blagojevich scandal ==
In tape-recorded conversations in November and December 2008, Illinois Gov. Rod Blagojevich and his chief of staff, John Harris, allegedly discussed threats to withhold $100 million or more in state money for renovations to the Chicago Cubs' Wrigley Field baseball stadium, which is owned by Chicago Tribune parent Tribune Company, unless McCormick was fired by the Chicago Tribune.

In a first-person essay titled "Life on Blago's enemies list", McCormick expressed his bafflement at being singled out by Blagojevich. He wrote, "If somebody did try for more than a month to extort or otherwise muscle the Chicago Tribune—a newspaper I sold as a child—it did not work. I did not know about it. My boss did not know about it. His boss did not know about it. I hope you fathom how gratifying that is." McCormick also noted that he "never had a personal tiff" with Blagojevich, who had always been cordial when he visited the Tribune for editorial board meetings. McCormick further said that he did write many editorials strongly critical of Blagovich, who he described as "the governor who cannot govern."

== Personal ==
McCormick and his wife, Dawn, have two sons, Michael and Conor, and live in La Grange Park, Illinois.
