= Roseville Area High School =

Public school in Roseville, Minnesota, United States

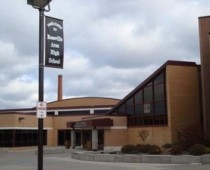

Location
- 1240 County Road B2 W Roseville, Minnesota 55113; United States; 45°00′43″N 93°09′07″W

Information
- Type: Public
- Established: 1986
- Principal: Jen Wilson
- Staff: 100.44 (FTE)
- Enrollment: 2,316 (2023–2024)
- Student to teacher ratio: 23.06
- Colors: Black & Silver
- Song: Raiders' Fight Song
- Mascot: Silver Fox
- Nickname: Roseville Raiders
- Website: rahs.isd623.org

Roseville Area High School (RAHS) is a public high school in Roseville, Minnesota, United States. It serves Roseville and the surrounding communities of Arden Hills, Falcon Heights, Lauderdale, Little Canada, Maplewood, and Shoreview. RAHS is the only comprehensive public high school in Roseville Area School District 623.

== History ==
RAHS occupies the site of the former Alexander Ramsey High School. In 1986, Ramsey High School and Frank B. Kellogg High School merged because of declining enrollment at both schools. The new school used the Ramsey complex's facilities while the former Kellogg High School became Roseville Area Middle School.

Plans originally called for constructing a new high school (replacing both Ramsey and Kellogg) on district-owned land near Lake Owasso, but after the voter referendum on financing the proposed school failed, it became necessary to expand and remodel the existing Roseville Area High School instead. The land held by the school district was sold and the proceeds used to finance RAHS's construction. The community built on the sold land is now known as Owasso Hills.

During the 1986–87 school year, RAHS operated on two campuses, with both East Campus (the former Kellogg site) and West Campus (formerly Ramsey) serving grades 9–12. From 1987 to 1997, RAHS had only 10th–12th grades, with 9th grade at Roseville Area Middle School. On completion of the construction in 1997, 9th grade moved to RAHS.

Starting in 2019, the building began to be renovated and expanded by the Kraus-Anderson construction company, leading to updates of the main building, and the construction of a new E Wing building, with most of the renovations completed by 2021.

== Academics and sports ==
Roseville Area High School operates on a trimester system and allows students to take a maximum of five credits each trimester. RAHS offers a variety of Advanced Placement, (AP) College in the Schools (CIS), Honors, Connections and standard track curriculum.

The English, mathematics, and social studies curricula include 9th- and 10th-grade level pre-AP courses. In 2007, Roseville Area School District 623 received a $720,000 grant from the Minnesota Department of Education to expand AP and pre-AP programming in the district.

RAHS participates in the College in the Schools (CIS) program run by the University of Minnesota that allows high school students to earn college credit while staying in their high school.

=== Post-Secondary Enrollment Options (PSEO) ===
In addition to the curriculum offered at RAHS, in accordance with state law, upperclassmen in good academic standing may enroll in post-secondary courses at no cost. Students can apply part-time or full-time to a number of affiliated institutions, including Century College, Macalester College, and the University of Minnesota. Credits earned at post-secondary institutions fulfill both high school and college credit requirements, and all high school graduation requirements must still be met.

=== Sports ===
RAHS is a member of the Suburban East Conference.

== School song ==
The Raiders' Fight Song is by former University of Minnesota Director of Bands Frank Bencriscutto. Its melody is an inverted version of the old Frank B. Kellogg High School fight song, also by Bencriscutto.

== Notable alumni ==
=== Alexander Ramsey High School ===
- Loni Anderson (Class of 1963) – actress
- Mohammad Aslam Khan Khalil (Class of 1966) – theoretical physicist
- Stephen Paulus (Class of 1967) – Grammy-nominated composer
- Richard Dean Anderson (Class of 1968) – actor, MacGyver, Stargate SG-1
- Ming Sen Shiue (Class of 1969), convicted murderer and rapist
- Rebecca Blank (Class of 1973) – economist; Acting U.S. Secretary of Commerce; Chancellor, University of Wisconsin-Madison
- Greg Mortenson (Class of 1975) – literacy advocate, executive director of the Central Asia Institute, bestselling co-author of Three Cups of Tea
- Peter Krause (Class of 1983) – Emmy-nominated TV actor, most notably on the series Six Feet Under and Parenthood
- Alan Rogowski – professional wrestler, known by the ring name Ole Anderson

=== Roseville Area High School ===
- Tim Foster (Class of 1987) – professional soccer player
- John D. McCormick (Class of 1987) – journalist at the Chicago Tribune who followed the 2008 Barack Obama presidential campaign
- Rod Smith (Class of 1988) – American football defensive back, played 7 seasons in the NFL
- Chris McAlpine (Class of 1990) – professional hockey player with NJ Devils and six other NHL teams
- Niko Medved (Class of 1992) – basketball coach
- Winny Brodt-Brown (Class of 1996) – hockey player, winner of first Minnesota Ms. Hockey Award, silver medalist at 2000 & 2001 IIHF World Ice Hockey Championships
- Marty Sertich (Class of 2001) – hockey player, won Hobey Baker Award in 2005 as nation's top collegiate player
- Mike Muscala (Class of 2009) – college basketball player for the Bucknell Bison, Patriot League Men's Basketball Player of the Year in 2010–11, professional basketball player for the Oklahoma City Thunder.
- Lee Stecklein (Class of 2012) – member of 2014, 2022 (silver medal) & 2018 (gold medal) U.S. women's Olympic ice hockey teams.
- Jesper Horsted (Class of 2015) – professional football player for the Las Vegas Raiders.
- Maggie Nichols (Class of 2016) – Member of 2013, 2014, and 2015 U.S. National Gymnastics team as well as 2015 World Championship team.
- Morgan Riddle (Class of 2015) – Fashion and Lifestyle Influencer, girlfriend of notable Tennis Player Taylor Fritz

== Notable faculty ==
- Tom Tillberry (counselor) – former member of the Minnesota House of Representatives representing District 51B
