= Morgan Riddle =

American internet celebrity (born 1997)

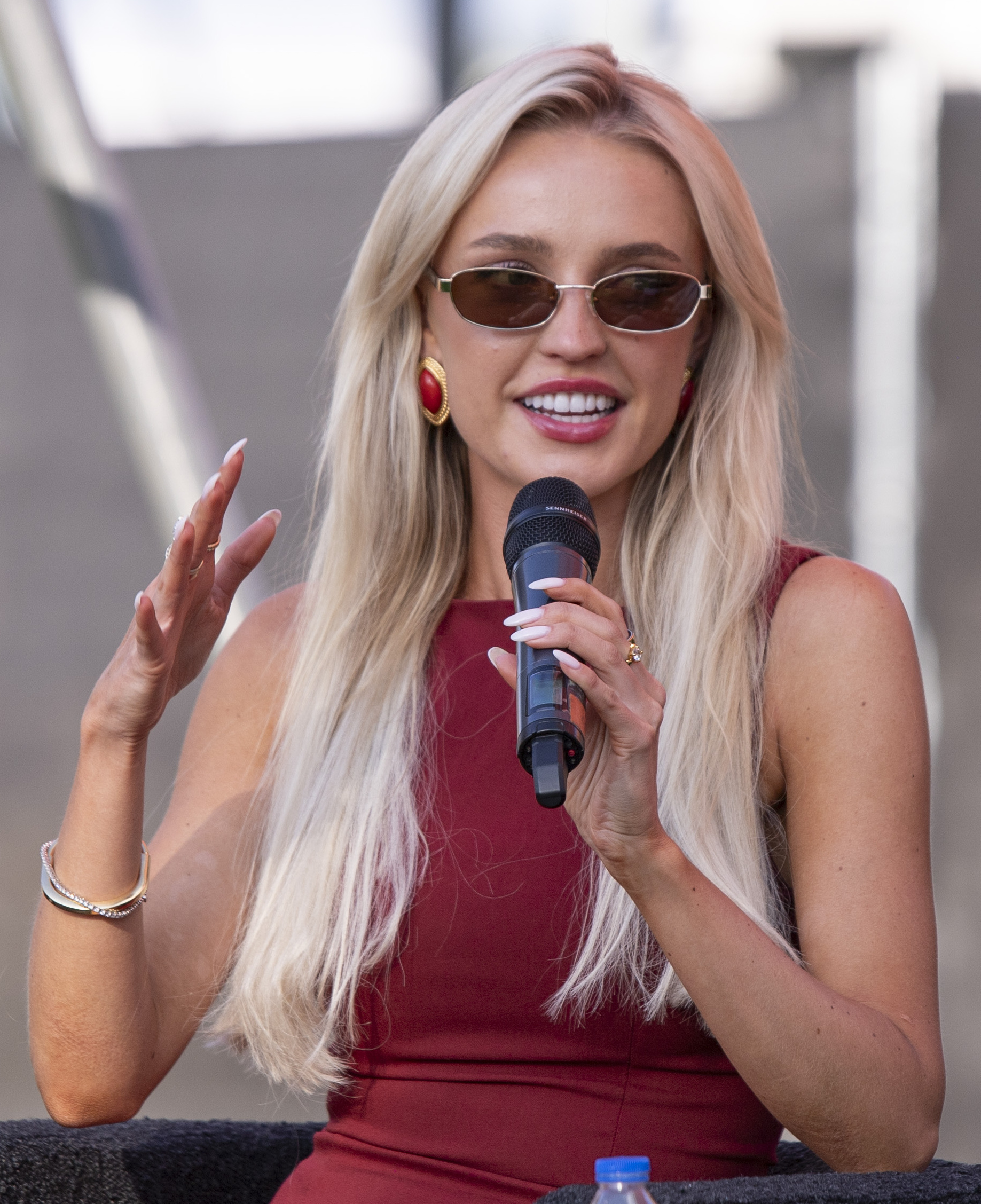
- Riddle in 2025
- Born: Morgan Riddle Kimm; July 31, 1997 (age 29)
- Education: Wagner College
- Occupations: Influencer; model; former WAG
- Partner(s): Taylor Fritz (2020–2026)

Instagram information
- Page: Morgan Riddle
- Years active: 2013–present
- Followers: 498,000 (May 26, 2025)

YouTube information
- Channel: Morgan Riddle
- Years active: 2022–present
- Subscribers: 108,000 (May 26, 2025)
- Views: 7.7 million (May 26, 2025)

Morgan Riddle Kimm (born July 31, 1997) is an American internet personality known for posting about life on the professional tennis tour as the then-girlfriend of tennis player Taylor Fritz.

== Life and career ==
Riddle grew up in Saint Paul, Minnesota and attended Roseville Area High School, the eldest child of Heather Riddle, an executive at Minnesota Public Radio, and Rob Kimm, who has written books on fishing. She studied English literature at Wagner College in Staten Island, New York City. While in college, she began posting lifestyle content on Instagram and TikTok and worked as a model. After college, she worked in real estate and then as a media director for the company Love Your Melon and the non-profit Gamers Outreach Foundation.

Riddle met professional tennis player Taylor Fritz on the dating app Raya in early 2020 shortly after moving to Los Angeles. She began traveling with him on the ATP Tour in 2021, leaving her corporate job the next year. Since early 2022, she has produced social media content related to tennis, starting with a TikTok video about what to wear to the Australian Open. She has said she knew little about tennis before dating Fritz, and some of her content is intended to explain the sport's rules to outsiders. She began a YouTube channel vlogging about life on the tennis tour in 2023. She has appeared with Fritz in Break Point, a Netflix series following the tennis tour. During the 2023 Wimbledon Championships, she began hosting a short video series, "Wimbledon Threads", about fashion at the tournament.

== See also ==
- WAGs
