= Jack McCormack =

Jack McCormack may refer to:

- Jack McCormack (Australian rules footballer) (1904–1966), Australian rules footballer
- Jack McCormack (rugby league) (1904–1996), Australian rugby league player

== See also ==
- John McCormack (disambiguation)
