= John McCormack (journalist) =

American journalist

John McCormack is a journalist and the Washington correspondent for National Review.

In a 2013 interview of journalist Robert Costa, Costa cites, among others, two examples of "great reporters" for conservative outlets. One of them is John McCormack.

Early in his career as a journalist, McCormack was an intern for National Review in Washington, D.C. He later became a senior writer for The Weekly Standard from 2007 to 2018.

McCormack has appeared on a range of radio and TV news programs, including MSNBC's Morning Joe, CNN's Inside Politics, HBO’s Real Time, NPR's On Point, and Fox News' programs such as Special Report with Bret Baier.

McCormack, a native of Baldwin, Wisconsin, lives with his wife Lauren in Alexandria, Virginia.
