= Justin Fields =

American football player (born 1999)

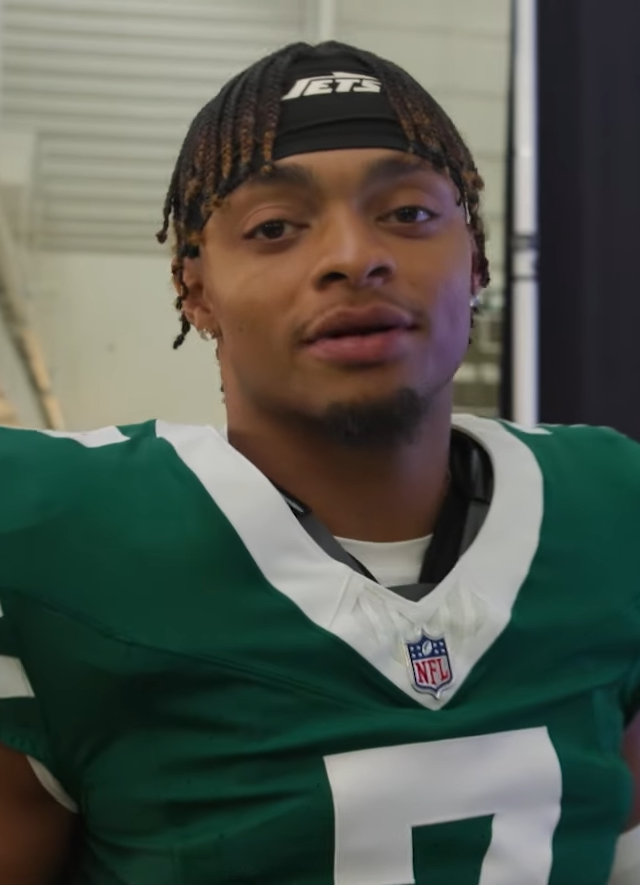
- Fields with the New York Jets in 2025

No. 6 – Kansas City Chiefs
- Position: Quarterback
- Roster status: Active

Personal information
- Born: March 5, 1999 (age 27); Kennesaw, Georgia, U.S.
- Listed height: 6 ft 3 in (1.91 m)
- Listed weight: 227 lb (103 kg)

Career information
- High school: Harrison (Kennesaw)
- College: Georgia (2018); Ohio State (2019–2020)
- NFL draft: 2021: 1st round, 11th overall pick

Career history
- Chicago Bears (2021–2023); Pittsburgh Steelers (2024); New York Jets (2025); Kansas City Chiefs (2026–present)

Awards and highlights
- Second-team All-American (2019); Big Ten Most Valuable Player (2020); 2× Big Ten Offensive Player of the Year (2019, 2020); 2× Big Ten Quarterback of the Year (2019, 2020); 2× First-team All-Big Ten (2019, 2020); NFL record: Most rushing yards by a quarterback in a regular season game: 178; Consecutive games with a rushing touchdown by a quarterback: 6

Career NFL statistics as of Week 10, 2026
- Passing attempts: 1,323
- Passing completions: 812
- Completion percentage: 61.4%
- TD–INT: 52–32
- Passing yards: 9,039
- Passer rating: 84.7
- Rushing yards: 2,891
- Rushing touchdowns: 23
- Stats at Pro Football Reference

Justin Skyler Fields (born March 5, 1999) is an American professional football quarterback for the Kansas City Chiefs of the National Football League (NFL). Following a stint with the Georgia Bulldogs, he played college football for the Ohio State Buckeyes, twice winning Big Ten Offensive Player of the Year between 2019 and 2020 and appearing in the 2021 National Championship Game.

Fields was selected in the first round of the 2021 NFL draft by the Chicago Bears, setting the single-game regular season record for quarterback rushing yards and becoming the third NFL quarterback to have a 1,000-yard rushing season. His tenure was also marked by inconsistent play and few wins, leading to him being traded in 2024 to the Pittsburgh Steelers, where he mostly served as a backup. Fields became the starter of the New York Jets the following year, but struggled before his season was cut short by injury. After the season, he was traded to the Chiefs.

== Early life ==
Fields attended Harrison High School in Kennesaw, Georgia. In two years as the starting quarterback for Harrison, he totaled 4,187 passing yards, 41 passing touchdowns, 2,096 rushing yards, and 28 rushing touchdowns. In the summer before his senior year in 2017, he attended the Elite 11 quarterback competition and was named MVP of the event. Late in his senior year, in a game that was nationally televised on ESPN, he suffered a broken finger that required season-ending surgery. After his senior season, he was named Mr. Georgia Football by the Touchdown Club of Atlanta, as well as first-team all-state. In addition to football, Fields was also a standout baseball player for Harrison High.

College recruiting
Name	Hometown	School	Height	Weight	40^{‡}	Commit date
Justin Fields; QB	Kennesaw, GA	Harrison	6 ft 3 in (1.91 m)	221 lb (100 kg)	4.50	Oct 6, 2017
Justin Fields; QB	Recruit ratings: Rivals: 247Sports: ESPN: (94)					
Overall recruit ranking: Rivals: 2 (Nat.) 1 (QB-DT) 247Sports: 2 (Nat.) 1 (QB-DT) ESPN: 1 (Nat.) 1 (QB-DT)
‡ Refers to 40-yard dash; Note: In many cases, Scout, Rivals, 247Sports, On3, and ESPN may conflict in their listings of height, weight and 40 time.; In these cases, the average was taken. ESPN grades are on a 100-point scale.; Sources: "2018 Georgia Football Commitment List". Rivals.; "Georgia Bulldogs 2018 Player Commits". ESPN.; "2018 Team Ranking". Rivals.com.; "Georgia 2018 Football Commits". 247Sports.

Fields was rated as a five-star recruit and was the highest rated dual-threat quarterback in the class of 2018 by ESPN, Rivals.com, and 247Sports.com. ESPN listed him as the top recruit overall, while Rivals and 247Sports ranked him second behind fellow quarterback and Georgia native Trevor Lawrence. In October 2017, Fields committed to the University of Georgia to play college football after withdrawing a previous commitment to Penn State. His senior year was documented in the second season of the Netflix series QB1: Beyond the Lights (2018).

== College career ==
=== Georgia ===
In his true freshman season at Georgia in 2018, Fields served as the backup to starting quarterback Jake Fromm. In Georgia's season opener against Austin Peay, Fields made his debut in the second quarter and started the second half. He completed seven of eight passes on the day, including a 10-yard touchdown pass to Isaac Nauta in the 45–0 victory. On September 29, against Tennessee, he had five carries for 45 rushing yards and two rushing touchdowns in the 38–12 victory. In a late-season 66–27 rout of UMass, Fields threw two touchdown passes and ran for another on the ground, finishing with 121 passing yards and 100 rushing yards.

During the 2018 season, Fields saw action in 12 games, totaling 328 passing yards, four passing touchdowns, 266 rushing yards, and four rushing touchdowns. Following Georgia's loss to Alabama in the 2018 SEC Championship Game, Fields announced his intent to transfer to Ohio State.

=== Ohio State ===
Fields, who would normally be required to sit out for one year due to NCAA transfer rules, sought a waiver to be able to play immediately for Ohio State. Fields enlisted the help of attorney Thomas Mars, who helped secure immediate eligibility for several transfers from Ole Miss in 2018, including quarterback Shea Patterson. Mars and Fields argued that Fields should be granted a waiver for immediate eligibility due to an NCAA guideline that waives the waiting period for athletes with "documented mitigating circumstances that are outside the student-athlete’s control and directly impact the health, safety and well-being of the student-athlete." Fields was subject to an incident at Georgia in which a Bulldogs baseball player allegedly used a racial slur against Fields. This was believed to be the main incident constituting Fields' claim of "mitigating circumstances", although the full contents of the waiver request were never made public. On February 8, 2019, Fields was granted immediate eligibility for the 2019 season by the NCAA.

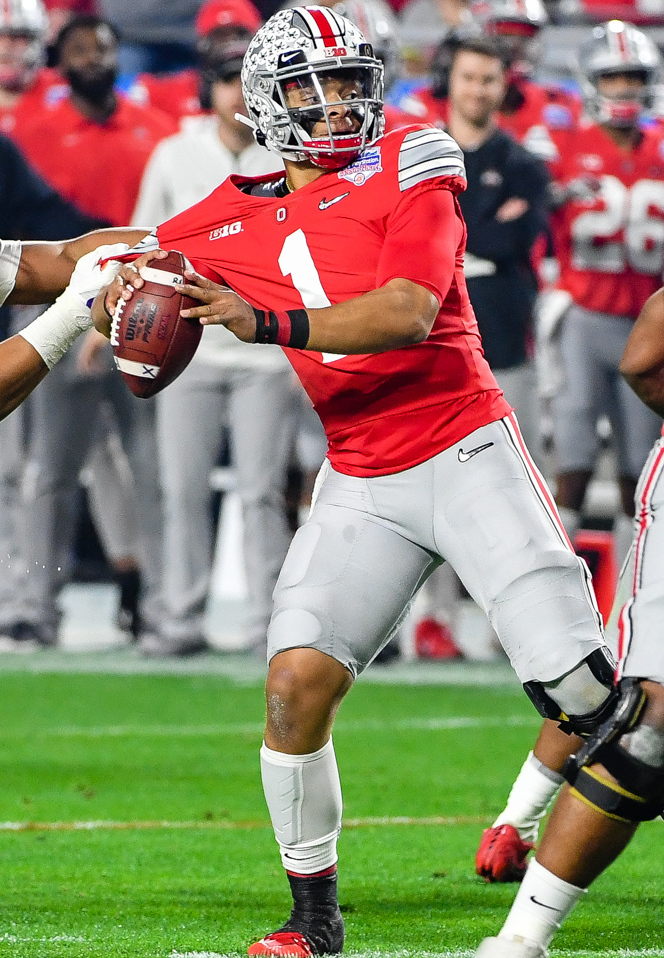
Fields in the 2019 Fiesta Bowl

==== 2019 season ====
In Fields' first season with the Buckeyes, he helped lead the team to a Big Ten Championship with a 34–21 victory over Wisconsin, and a spot in the College Football Playoff. Fields finished third in the running for the Heisman Trophy, was named the Big Ten Offensive Player of the Year and first-team all-conference. In the 2019 Fiesta Bowl against Clemson, he had 320 passing yards, one touchdown, and two interceptions in the 29–23 loss in the College Football Playoff semifinal. He finished the season with 3,273 passing yards, 41 passing touchdowns, and three interceptions to go along with 484 rushing yards and ten rushing touchdowns.

==== 2020 season ====
Fields entered the 2020 season as a leading candidate for the Heisman Trophy. The season was played amid the ongoing COVID-19 pandemic, with the Big Ten Conference ultimately opting for a shortened conference-only schedule after initially canceling. Fields was vocal in his support of playing the season, and he started an online petition that gathered over 320,000 signatures in support of that goal.

Fields helped lead the Buckeyes to another undefeated regular season and Big Ten Championship with a 22–10 victory over Northwestern. Ohio State received another bid to the College Football Playoff, playing a rematch against Clemson. Ohio State was victorious in the rematch, 49–28, with Fields throwing 385 passing yards and six touchdowns in the game. Fields took a hard hit to the midsection in the game and played through the injury in a performance that Sports Illustrated dubbed "legendary". The Buckeyes advanced to the College Football Playoff National Championship, where they lost to Alabama, 52–24. Fields finished the shortened 2020 season with 2,100 passing yards, 22 passing touchdowns, and six interceptions, he also added 383 rushing yards and five rushing touchdowns on the ground. He repeated as the Big Ten's Offensive Player of the Year and unanimous first-team all-conference. On January 18, 2021, Fields announced that he would be forgoing his final two years of eligibility to enter the 2021 NFL draft.

== Professional career ==
=== Pre-draft ===
Pre-draft measurables
Height	Weight	Arm length	Hand span	Wingspan	40-yard dash	10-yard split	20-yard split	Broad jump
6 ft 2 3/4 in (1.90 m)	227 lb (103 kg)	32 1/2 in (0.83 m)	9 1/8 in (0.23 m)	6 ft 2 3/4 in (1.90 m)	4.46 s	1.59 s	2.60 s	9 ft 11 in (3.02 m)
All values from Pro Day

=== Chicago Bears ===
==== 2021 season ====
Fields was selected 11th overall in the 2021 NFL draft by the Chicago Bears, who traded up with the New York Giants in exchange for the 20th overall pick, their fifth-round pick in 2021, and their first and fourth-round picks in 2022. A top quarterback prospect in the draft, Fields was one of five taken in the first round. He signed his four-year rookie contract, worth $18.8 million fully guaranteed, on June 10, 2021.

Although Fields was named the second-string quarterback behind Andy Dalton, he made his NFL debut in the season opener against the Los Angeles Rams, taking the field on four plays. He scored a five-yard rushing touchdown and completed two passes for 10 yards in the 34–14 defeat. After Dalton suffered a knee injury in Week 2 against the Cincinnati Bengals, Fields entered the game in the third quarter. Fields completed 6 of 13 passes for 60 yards with one interception, while also rushing for 31 yards, as the Bears won 20–17. With Dalton sidelined from his injury, Fields was named the starter in the following week's matchup against the Cleveland Browns. His starting debut saw him sacked 9 times, 4.5 of which were delivered by defensive end Myles Garrett, while completing 6 of 20 passes for 68 yards. The Bears, who finished with 47 yards of offense, lost 26–6.

Fields won in his second career start the next week in a 24–14 victory against the Detroit Lions. He completed 11 of 17 passes for 209 yards and had one interception off a deflected pass. After Fields was named the starter for the remainder of the season, he led the Bears to a 20–9 victory over the Las Vegas Raiders in Week 5, completing 12 of 20 passes for 111 yards and throwing his first touchdown pass to tight end Jesper Horsted. In Week 7 against the Tampa Bay Buccaneers, Fields committed 5 turnovers – 3 interceptions and 2 lost fumbles – as the Bears were defeated 38–3. Fields had his first 100-yard rushing game the next week against the San Francisco 49ers, throwing for 175 yards and a touchdown, and also scored a rushing touchdown. However, the game ended in a 33–22 defeat, with Fields throwing an interception on the Bears' final drive. In the following week's Monday Night Football matchup with the Pittsburgh Steelers, Fields threw for a career-high 291 yards, but despite rallying to give the Bears a 27–26 lead in the fourth quarter, the Steelers pulled away to win 29–27.

In Week 11 against the Baltimore Ravens, Fields exited the game in the third quarter with an injury to his ribs. He was replaced by Dalton in the 16–13 loss. After the game, it was announced Fields had multiple cracked ribs, which forced him to miss the Bears' next two matchups. He returned in a Week 14 loss to the Green Bay Packers, but an ankle injury in the following week's defeat to the Minnesota Vikings sidelined him for another two games. Fields tested positive for COVID-19 ahead of the season finale, making the Week 15 game the last of his rookie year. He finished the season fifth in quarterback rushing yards at 420, the most among rookies, but also had the third-most quarterback fumbles at 12 and the second-most lost fumbles at 5.

==== 2022 season ====
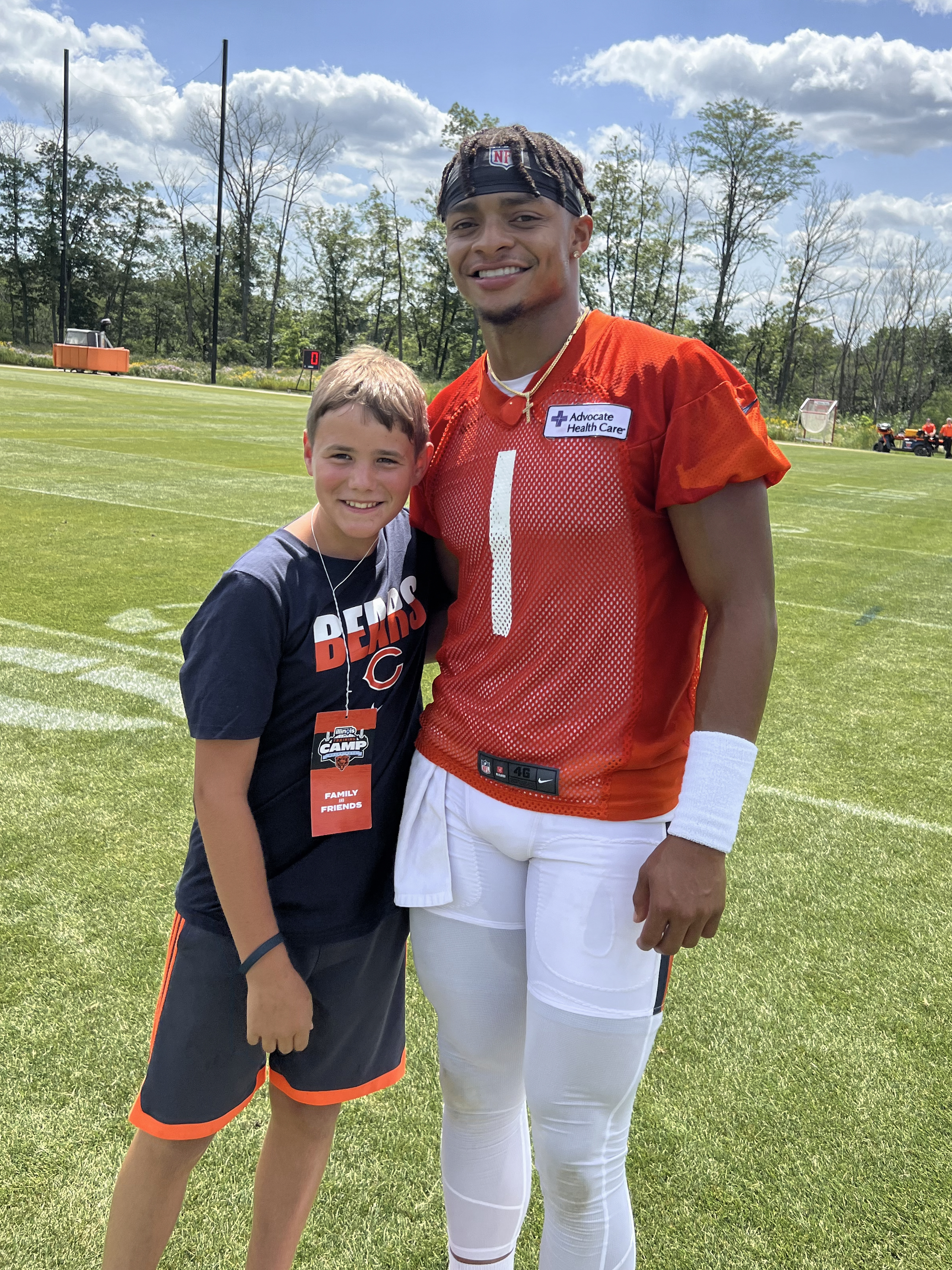
Fields (right) with a Bears fan at training camp in 2022

Fields' 2022 season began with a comeback 19–10 victory over the 49ers, completing 8 of 17 passes for 121 yards, two touchdowns, and an interception. The Bears lost four of their next five games, including a three-game losing streak, which saw Fields complete 56.1% of his passes for 748 yards, two touchdowns, and four interceptions, and rush for 254 yards on 43 carries. The losing streak ended in Week 7 with a Monday Night Football victory over the New England Patriots, during which Fields completed 13 of 21 passes for 179 yards, a touchdown, and an interception, and rushed for 82 yards and a touchdown on 14 carries to secure the 33–14 upset.

In Week 9 against the Miami Dolphins, Fields set the NFL single-game regular season record for quarterback rushing yards at 178, surpassing Michael Vick's 20-year record. He also became the first NFL player to have three touchdown passes and rush for at least 150 yards in the same game and scored the Bears franchise's longest quarterback rushing touchdown at 61 yards. Although the Bears lost 35–32, Fields was named NFC Offensive Player of the Week. In the next week's matchup with the Lions, Fields became the first NFL quarterback to rush for 140 yards in consecutive games and the first in the Super Bowl era to have multiple rushing touchdowns of over 60 yards. However, the Bears lost 31–30.

During a Week 11 loss to the Atlanta Falcons, Fields suffered an injury to his non-throwing shoulder, which sidelined him for a week. He returned in Week 13 against the Packers and became the first quarterback in the Super Bowl era to rush for a touchdown in six consecutive games, although the Bears would lose 28–19. Fields suffered a hip injury in a Week 17 loss to the Lions, which caused him to miss the season finale against the Vikings. Fields and the Bears would not win another game in 2022 after their Week 7 victory, dropping the team to a league-worst 3–14 record.

Fields finished his second year with 1,143 rushing yards, making him the third NFL quarterback after Vick and Lamar Jackson to rush for 1,000 yards in a season. However, he also led the league in sacks taken at 55 and fumbles at 16. He was ranked 86th by his fellow players on the NFL Top 100 Players of 2023.

==== 2023 season ====
Fields' 2023 season began with a 38–20 loss against the Packers, completing 24 of 37 passes for 216 yards, one touchdown, and an interception that became a pick-six. In Week 2 against the Buccaneers, Fields completed 16 passes on 29 attempts for 211 yards, and one touchdown to two interceptions. With the loss, the Bears started 0–2 for the first time since 2017. In Week 3, the Bears traveled to Arrowhead Stadium in Kansas City to face Patrick Mahomes and the Kansas City Chiefs, losing 41–10. Fields completed 11 passes on 22 attempts for 99 yards, one touchdown, and an interception, and rushed 11 times for 47 yards. The Bears started 0–3 for the first time since 2016. Despite suffering a head injury, Fields did not miss a play.

In Week 4 against the Denver Broncos, Fields started a perfect 16 for 16 in the first half, which was a Bears franchise record. Fields also had his first career 300-yard passing game. Fields and the Bears had a 28–7 lead in the 3rd quarter, but ultimately lost 31–28. In the fourth quarter, a fumble by Fields was recovered for a touchdown by Jonathon Cooper. In total, Fields completed 28 of 35 passes for 335 yards, and threw four touchdown passes and one interception. The following week against the Washington Commanders, Fields would finally lead the Bears to their first win of the year, a 40–20 victory that saw Fields toss four touchdowns for the second straight week, three of which were to star wideout D. J. Moore.

In Week 6 against the Vikings, Fields struggled mightily, being pressured constantly and only completing 6 of his 10 passes for 58 yards and an interception along with 4 sacks. Early in the third quarter, Fields dislocated his shoulder and thumb while being sacked by Danielle Hunter and was replaced by undrafted rookie Tyson Bagent for the rest of the game as the Bears lost 19–13 to fall to 1–5. Fields would go on to miss the next four games. He returned in Week 11 against the Lions, in which the Bears took a 26–14 lead late in the fourth quarter, but ended up losing, dropping to 3–8. Fields finished the game with 169 yards passing and a touchdown while also rushing eighteen times for a team-high 104 yards. Fields and the Bears then played the Vikings on Monday Night Football in Week 12, where the Bears won 12–10 off a game-winning field goal with 10 seconds left. Fields threw for 217 yards, including the 36-yard pass to DJ Moore that put the Bears in field goal range late in the 4th quarter, and rushed for an additional 59 yards.

Fields finished his third season setting career-highs in completion percentage (61.4%) and passing yards (2,562) along with throwing a career-low nine interceptions. With the Bears holding the first overall pick in the 2024 NFL draft, Fields headed into the offseason facing uncertainty about his future as the team's starting quarterback, with questions arising over whether Chicago would stick with Fields or select a new quarterback in the draft.

=== Pittsburgh Steelers ===
On March 16, 2024, Fields was traded to the Pittsburgh Steelers in exchange for a conditional sixth-round pick in the 2025 NFL draft that would have converted to a fourth if he played 51% of the team's snaps, however, he played in less than the said threshold, failing the condition to convert it to a fourth. The Steelers declined the fifth-year option on Fields' contract, making him a free agent after the 2024 season. Following a preseason quarterback competition between Fields and Russell Wilson, the Steelers announced that Fields would back up Wilson to start the season. Prior to Week 1, Wilson reaggravated a calf injury during practice. He was later ruled out, thrusting Fields into the starting role for the season opener against the Atlanta Falcons. He completed 17-of-23 pass attempts for 156 yards, zero touchdowns, and zero turnovers. He also added 57 rushing yards as the Steelers won 18–10. With Wilson still not cleared to play in Week 2 against the Denver Broncos, Fields was once again named the team's starter. During the game, Fields committed no turnovers and scored his first touchdown as a Steeler on a five yard pass to tight end Darnell Washington. The Steelers would defeat the Broncos with a final score of 13-6, giving Fields his second consecutive win as the Steelers' starting quarterback. His style of play through his three starts as a dynamic quarterback drew comparisons with former Steelers quarterback/wide receiver Kordell Stewart. Through his first three starts with the Steelers, Fields completed 73.3% of his passes (55 of 75), averaging 6.9 yards per throw and committed one turnover against three total touchdowns, two passing and one rushing. This marks the first time in Fields' professional career where he has led his team to three straight wins in the starting position. Fields would follow up his three straight victories with two straight losses to the Indianapolis Colts and Dallas Cowboys with a combined three touchdowns and 443 passing yards.

On October 15, 2024, Fields was demoted to backup quarterback duties as Wilson's calf injury had healed. The change at quarterback came following a Steelers 32–13 win over the Las Vegas Raiders in which Fields completed 14-of-24 passes for 145 yards, committing no turnovers and scoring two rushing touchdowns. During Week 11's 18–16 victory over the Baltimore Ravens, Fields returned to the quarterback position for one play. In the closing seconds of regulation, Fields took a snap and ran to his left before sliding just a yard shy of a first down to run time off the play clock and secure a Steelers victory.

Throughout much of the season following his benching, Fields was utilized in multiple "package plays" that typically included quarterback sneak plays and blitz-countering scramble short passes, typically to convert third and fourth downs. He finished the 2024 season completing 65% of his passes for 1,106 yards, 10 total touchdowns (five passing, five rushing) and just one interception. He appeared in 10 total games, starting six. He briefly appeared in two package plays during the Steelers' 28–14 loss to the Baltimore Ravens in AFC Wild Card playoff game, handing off the ball to Jaylen Warren on an read pass option play as well as throwing an incomplete pass intended for Darnell Washington.

=== New York Jets ===
On March 13, 2025, Fields signed a two-year, $40 million contract with the New York Jets. On March 30, general manager Darren Mougey announced Fields would be the team's starting quarterback. On October 12, against the Denver Broncos, Fields threw for only 45 yards in a full game of action in what ESPN.com called the "worst passing performance in New York Jets history". The Jets' -10 net passing yards (which includes nine sacks for 55 yards) was the worst in the NFL since the San Diego Chargers had -19 net passing yards on September 20, 1998.

After a winless start to the season through seven games, Jets owner Woody Johnson criticized Fields' play, saying that it was "hard" to win "when you have a quarterback with a rating that he's got." Following the 0–7 start, the Jets won back-to-back games over the Cincinnati Bengals and Cleveland Browns, with a bye week in between. The team then lost to the New England Patriots, and Fields was benched the following week in favor of Tyrod Taylor for the team's Week 12 matchup against the Baltimore Ravens. After dealing with knee soreness, he was subsequently ruled out for the team's Week 14 matchup against the Miami Dolphins. Fields was placed on injured reserve on December 23, ending his season.

=== Kansas City Chiefs ===
On March 18, 2026, the Jets traded Fields to the Kansas City Chiefs in exchange for a sixth-round pick in the 2027 NFL draft. As part of the trade negotiations, the Jets agreed to pay $8 million to Fields while the Chiefs will pay him $3 million totaling $11 million in guarantees.

Throughout the offseason, Fields competed with Garrett Nussmeier to be the backup quarterback to Mahomes for 2026 and won the role. In the season opener against the Denver Broncos, Fields briefly entered the game for a trick play dubbed "Heisman": Fields lined up in the backfield next to Mahomes, and both quarterbacks ran to the left while running back Kenneth Walker III went in the opposite direction; Walker then caught a shovel pass from Mahomes and ran for the two-yard touchdown.

During the Week 9 meeting with the Jets, the Chiefs had Fields attempt a sneak on a third down-and-one situation on their own 34-yard line. The team was hesitant to have Mahomes perform sneaks after he suffered an injury doing so in 2019. Fields failed to convert against his former team, fumbling and losing the ball to Jets linebacker Demario Davis. New York scored on the ensuing drive. After the game, a 35–12 victory for Kansas City, Chiefs head coach Andy Reid joked to the media that "you guys asked for it, we gave it to you. How did it work? Those are hard to practice."

== Career statistics ==
Legend
	Led the league
**Bold**	Career high

=== NFL ===
==== Regular season ====
Year	Team	Games			Passing									Rushing					Sacks		Fumbles	
Year	Team	GP	GS	Record	Cmp	Att	Pct	Yds	Y/A	Lng	TD	Int	Rtg	Att	Yds	Y/A	Lng	TD	Sck	Yds	Fum	Lost
2021	CHI	12	10	2−8	159	270	58.9	1,870	6.9	**64**	7	10	73.2	72	420	5.8	23	2	36	264	12	**5**
2022	CHI	15	15	3−12	192	318	60.4	2,242	**7.1**	56	**17**	**11**	85.2	**160**	**1,143**	**7.1**	**67**	**8**	**55**	**359**	**16**	2
2023	CHI	13	13	**5−8**	**227**	**370**	61.4	**2,562**	6.9	58	16	9	86.3	124	657	5.3	39	4	44	285	10	4
2024	PIT	10	6	4−2	106	161	**65.8**	1,106	6.9	55	5	1	**93.3**	62	289	4.7	30	5	16	124	6	1
2025	NYJ	9	9	2−7	128	204	62.7	1,259	6.2	42	7	1	89.5	71	383	5.4	43	4	27	192	4	2
2026	KAN	3	0	0−0	0	0	0.0	0	0.0	0	0	0	0.0	3	-1	-0.3	0	0	0	0	1	1
Career		62	53	16–37	812	1,323	61.4	9,039	6.8	64	52	32	84.7	492	2,891	5.9	67	23	178	1,224	49	15

==== Postseason ====
Year	Team	Games			Passing									Rushing					Sacks		Fumbles	
Year	Team	GP	GS	Record	Cmp	Att	Pct	Yds	Y/A	Lng	TD	Int	Rtg	Att	Yds	Y/A	Lng	TD	Sck	Yds	Fum	Lost
2024	PIT	1	0	—	0	1	0.0	0	0.0	0.0	0	0	39.6	0	0	0.0	0	0	0	0	0	0
Career		1	0	—	0	1	0.0	0	0.0	0.0	0	0	39.6	0	0	0.0	0	0	0	0	0	0

=== College ===
Season	Team	Games			Passing								Rushing			
Season	Team	GP	GS	Record	Cmp	Att	Pct	Yds	Avg	TD	Int	Rtg	Att	Yds	Avg	TD
2018	Georgia	12	0	—	27	39	69.2	328	8.4	4	0	173.7	42	266	**6.3**	4
2019	Ohio State	14	14	**13−1**	**238**	**354**	67.2	**3,273**	9.2	**41**	3	**181.4**	**137**	**484**	3.5	**10**
2020	Ohio State	8	8	7−1	158	225	**70.2**	2,100	**9.3**	22	**6**	175.6	81	383	4.7	5
Career		34	22	20−2	423	618	68.4	5,701	9.2	67	9	178.8	260	1,133	4.4	19

=== High school ===
Season	Passing							Rushing			Season	
Season	Cmp	Att	Pct	Yds	TD	Int	Rtg	Att	Yds	TD	Win	Loss
2016	**186**	**279**	**66.7**	**2,770**	**23**	**6**	117.5	**191**	**1,176**	**15**	**10**	**2**
2017	81	127	63.8	1,417	18	2	**134.7**	109	920	13	5	**2**
Career	267	406	65.8	4,187	41	8	125.3	300	2,096	28	15	4

== Career highlights ==
=== Awards and honors ===
NFL

- FedEx Ground Player of the Week – 2022 (Week 10)
- NFC Offensive Player of the Week – 2022 (Week 9)
- Ranked No. 86 in the Top 100 Players of 2023

College

- Chicago Tribune Silver Football – 2020
- 2× Graham–George Offensive Player of the Year – 2019 & 2020
- 2× Griese–Brees Quarterback of the Year – 2019 & 2020
- Grange–Griffin Big Ten Championship Game Most Valuable Player Trophy – 2019
- Second-Team All-American – 2019
- 2× First-Team All-Big Ten – 2019 & 2020
- SEC Freshman of the Week – 2018 (Week 12)

High school

- Elite 11 Most Valuable Player – 2017
- Mr. Georgia Football – 2018
- Class 6A Offensive Player of the Year – 2017
- First-Team All-State – 2017

=== Records ===
NFL records

- Most rushing yards by a quarterback in a single game: 178 (November 6, 2022, vs. Miami Dolphins)
- Most rushing yards by a quarterback over a five-game span in the Super Bowl era: 568 (2022)
- Most consecutive games by a quarterback with a rushing touchdown: 6 (2022)
  - Tied with Johnny Lujack (1950)
- Most consecutive games with 1+ rushing and passing touchdown: 5 (2022)
  - Tied with Kyler Murray (2020)
- First player to rush for 140+ yards and throw 3+ touchdowns in a single game (November 6, 2022, vs. Miami Dolphins)
- First player to rush for 100+ yards, throw 2+ touchdowns, and rush for 2+ touchdowns in a single game (November 13, 2022, vs. Detroit Lions)
- Only quarterback in the Super Bowl era with multiple 60+ yard rushing touchdowns
- Only quarterback since 1925 to score three rushing touchdowns over 50 yards

Ohio State school records

- Most completions, bowl game: 30 (December 28, 2019, vs. Clemson)
- Most passing yards, bowl game: 385 (January 21, 2021, vs. Clemson)
- Most passing touchdowns, bowl game: 6 (January 21, 2021, vs. Clemson)
- Most yards of total offense, bowl game: 427 (January 21, 2021, vs. Clemson)

== Personal life ==
Fields is a Christian. Fields was diagnosed with epilepsy as a freshman in high school. His condition was made public during his pre-draft interviews with NFL teams in 2021. In high school, he had a score of 29 on his ACT and held a 3.9 grade point average. Fields is a pescetarian. His sister, Jaiden, played college softball for Georgia, while his youngest sister, Jessica, plays college basketball for Michigan. Fields graduated with a degree in consumer and family financial services from Ohio State in May 2023.
