= John McCormick (Australian footballer) =

Australian rules footballer

Personal information
- Full name: John Alexander McCormick
- Born: 24 November 1899; Fitzroy North, Victoria
- Died: 22 January 1974 (aged 74); Fremantle, Western Australia
- Original team: Lancefield
- Height: 185 cm (6 ft 1 in)
- Weight: 83 kg (183 lb)

Playing career^{1}
Years	Club	Games (Goals)
1921–22	Hawthorn (VFA)	8 (0)
1923	Richmond	1 (0)
- ^{1} Playing statistics correct to the end of 1923.

John Alexander McCormick (24 November 1899 – 22 January 1974) was an Australian rules footballer who played with Richmond in the Victorian Football League (VFL).

McCormick enlisted in the Royal Australian Air Force at Point Cook in 1926 and remained a career officer through World War II until his retirement in 1948.
