= Jesper Horsted =

American football player (born 1997)

Profile
- Position: Tight end

Personal information
- Born: February 27, 1997 (age 29); Roseville, Minnesota, U.S.
- Listed height: 6 ft 3 in (1.91 m)
- Listed weight: 237 lb (108 kg)

Career information
- High school: Roseville Area
- College: Princeton
- NFL draft: 2019: undrafted

Career history
- Chicago Bears (2019–2021); Las Vegas Raiders (2022–2023); New Orleans Saints (2024)*; Carolina Panthers (2024)*
- * Offseason or practice squad member only

Awards and highlights
- 2× First-team All-Ivy League (2017, 2018)

Career NFL statistics as of 2023
- Receptions: 14
- Receiving yards: 131
- Receiving touchdowns: 3
- Stats at Pro Football Reference

Jesper Horsted (born February 27, 1997) is an American professional football tight end. He played college football at Princeton.

== College career ==
Horsted played wide receiver for the Princeton Tigers for four seasons. As a junior, he set school records with 92 receptions and 14 receiving touchdowns with 1,226 yards and was named first-team All-Ivy League. He caught 72 passes for 1,047 yards with 13 touchdowns in his senior season and was again named first-team All-Ivy. He finished his collegiate career as the schools all-time leader with 196 receptions and 28 receiving touchdowns and second with 2,703 receiving yards.

Horsted also was a member of the Princeton baseball team. He hit .324 with seven doubles and 14 RBIs in 36 games as a junior and batted .312 in 104 games over three seasons.

== Professional career ==
Pre-draft measurables
Height	Weight	Arm length	Hand span	40-yard dash	10-yard split	20-yard split	Vertical jump	Broad jump	Bench press
6 ft 3 3/4 in (1.92 m)	229 lb (104 kg)	32 1/8 in (0.82 m)	9 7/8 in (0.25 m)	4.77 s	1.68 s	2.63 s	32.0 in (0.81 m)	9 ft 10 in (3.00 m)	14 reps
All values from Pro Day

=== Chicago Bears ===
==== 2019 ====
Horsted signed with the Chicago Bears as an undrafted free agent on May 13, 2019. He was cut at the end of training camp, but was re-signed to the Bears' practice squad on September 1. Horsted was promoted to the Bears active roster on November 20. He made his NFL debut on November 24 against the New York Giants, catching one pass for four yards. Four days later against the Detroit Lions, he was named starting tight end as injuries plagued his teammates. In the third quarter, he scored his first NFL touchdown on an 18-yard reception from quarterback Mitchell Trubisky; the score tied the game at 17-all, and the Bears went on to win 24–20. Horsted finished his rookie season with eight receptions for 87 yards and a touchdown in six games played with one start.

==== 2020 ====
Horsted was among the final roster cuts on September 5, 2020, and was placed on the practice squad a day later. On January 11, 2021, Horsted signed a reserve/futures contract with the Bears, after spending the 2020 season on the Bears' practice squad.

==== 2021 ====
On August 28, 2021, Horsted caught three touchdown passes in the Bears' preseason finale against the Tennessee Titans. He secured a spot on the Bears' 53-man roster for the 2021 season. On October 10, Horsted caught a two-yard touchdown from Justin Fields in a game against the Las Vegas Raiders, marking Fields’ first career passing touchdown in the NFL. He finished the season scoring two touchdowns and making two receptions for 21 yards, in seven games played with zero starts.

==== 2022 ====
On May 11, 2022, Horsted was waived following a failed physical.

=== Las Vegas Raiders ===
Horsted signed with the Raiders as a free agent on June 7, 2022. He was moved from wide receiver to third-string tight end on the depth chart (originally intended for later-injured Jacob Hollister) after his performance at training camp. Darren Waller and Foster Moreau were first-string and second-string respectively.

Horsted finished the 2022 season with 3 receptions for 19 yards, in 15 games played with zero starts, having participated in 48% of all special teams snaps (190).

==== 2023 ====
Horsted was re-signed on March 10, 2023. The following August, he remained at third-string tight end. Austin Hooper and rookie Michael Mayer took on first-string and second-string respectively, after Waller and Moreau were no longer with the team. On December 24, Horsted was ruled out with a hamstring injury ahead of a game against division rival Kansas City Chiefs. 3 days later, he was placed on injured reserve.

Horsted finished the 2023 season with one reception for four yards, in 13 games played with zero starts, and participated in 65% of all special teams snaps (216).

=== New Orleans Saints ===
On June 14, 2024, Horsted signed with the New Orleans Saints. He was released on August 3.

=== Carolina Panthers ===
On August 5, 2024, Horsted signed with the Carolina Panthers. He was released on August 27.
