= John McCormack (Irish footballer) =

Irish footballer

John McCormack was an Irish soccer player who was active during the 1970s and 1980s.

Nicknamed "The Count," McCormack was a classy defender who played for Bohemians amongst others during his career in the League of Ireland He made 9 appearances for Bohs in European competition.

== Honours ==
- League of Ireland: 2
  - Bohemians - 1974/75, 1977/78
- FAI Cup: 1
  - Bohemians - 1976
- League of Ireland Cup: 2
  - Bohemians - 1975, 1979
