= John D. McCormick =

John McCormick is a Wall Street Journal reporter based in Chicago who covers national politics and government. He followed Barack Obama's presidential bid from its start in February 2007 and traveled with the candidate to nearly 40 states while working for the Chicago Tribune. Obama and McCormick developed a friendly rapport during the campaign. In August 2008, McCormick asked Obama if he was still "shopping" for a vice president. Obama's rebuke was, "John, how long did it take you to think of that question?"

On Nov. 7, 2008, during the Q&A portion of a news conference carried live on all major U.S. television networks, the then-president-elect allowed a handful of reporters to ask questions. Then, looking at the list of potential questioners on his podium, Obama smiled and called out, "Where is John McCormick?". McCormick's question was about the Senate seat Obama was vacating and whether he had any advice for the Illinois governor who, by statute, would be naming Obama's successor in the U.S. Senate.

A testier exchange took place on Dec. 16, 2008, when the reporter asked Obama about a list of favored potential replacements for his senate seat that had reportedly been given by his aides to then Illinois Gov. Rod Blagojevich. The Washington Post made mention of the exchange in a column by Dana Milbank.

McCormick worked for Bloomberg News from 2009 until 2019, when he joined the Wall Street Journal.

== Early life and education ==
McCormick was born in St. Paul, Minnesota. He is a 1987 graduate of Roseville Area High School and 1991 graduate of the University of St. Thomas (Minnesota).

Since his teenage years, McCormick has been an FCC-licensed amateur radio operator. His station includes a tower with a five-element yagi on the top, connected to an ICOM IC-756PRO transceiver. He is a skilled contester and DXer and active on most ham frequencies.

== Professional career ==
During his senior year of college, McCormick interned at the Minneapolis-based Star Tribune newspaper. About a month after graduation, he started a job at the Rochester Post-Bulletin in southeastern Minnesota, where he covered police, courts, local government, before being assigned to cover the Minnesota Legislature and state government in St. Paul.

In 1997, he moved to The Des Moines Register, where he initially worked as a business reporter and then became the paper's first computer-assisted reporting coordinator. He also helped cover the 2000 Iowa caucuses and was one of two Iowa Poll writers.

McCormick was hired by the Chicago Tribune in 2002. There, he has done investigative and project reporting, and has covered major news stories in Chicago and across the Midwest, including the 2002 fatal plane crash of Sen. Paul Wellstone in northern Minnesota. In 2003 and 2004, he was on a team of reporters who covered the presidential campaign.

In 2007, McCormick won the Chicago Tribune's Beck Award for Outstanding Profession Performance with another reporter for a year-long series on teen driving fatalities that led to changes in Illinois law. In 2009, he won the Chicago Tribune's Beck Award for Domestic Reporting with two other reporters for coverage of Obama's campaign.

After being promoted to the Tribune's Washington Bureau, McCormick resigned from the newspaper in July 2009 to join Bloomberg's Chicago Bureau.

McCormick left Bloomberg in May 2019 to join the Wall Street Journal as a Chicago-based national political reporter.
