= Goddard High School =

Goddard High School may refer to:

- Goddard High School (Kansas) in Goddard, Kansas
- Goddard High School (New Mexico) in Roswell, New Mexico
