= Jeff Berblinger =

American baseball player (born 1970)

- Second baseman
- Born: November 19, 1970 (age 55); Wichita, Kansas, U.S.
- Batted: Right Threw: Right

MLB debut
- September 7, 1997, for the St. Louis Cardinals

Last MLB appearance
- September 27, 1997, for the St. Louis Cardinals

MLB statistics
- Batting average: .000
- Runs: 1
- Hits: 0
- Stats at Baseball Reference

Teams
- St. Louis Cardinals (1997)

Jeffrey James Berblinger (born November 19, 1970) is an American former Major League Baseball second baseman. Jeff is a 1989 graduate of Goddard High School in Goddard, Kansas. He played one season at the major league level for the St. Louis Cardinals in 1997. He was drafted by the Cardinals in the 7th round of the 1993 Major League Baseball draft. Berblinger played his first professional season with the Class-A Glens Falls Redbirds and Class A St. Petersburg Cardinals in 1993. He played his last season with the AAA Omaha Royals and Nashville Sounds in 2001.
