= Palm Beach Central High School =

Location
- 8499 West Forest Hill Boulevard; Wellington, Florida 33411; United States; 26°39′04″N 80°10′47″W

Information
- Type: Public Secondary
- Established: 2003
- School district: School District of Palm Beach County
- Principal: Reggie Myers
- Staff: 150.00 (FTE)
- Grades: 9–12
- Enrollment: 2,841 (2023–2024)
- Student to teacher ratio: 18.94
- Colors: Cardinal red, Pewter, and Black
- Nickname: Broncos
- Website: pbch.palmbeachschools.org

Palm Beach Central High School is a high school located in Wellington, Florida in the School District of Palm Beach County. Opened in 2003, Palm Beach Central currently has over 3,000 students (2,966 in the 2019–20 school year) enrolled in grades nine through twelve. The school's mascot is the bronco, or bucking horse.

== Notable alumni ==
- Jon Bostic – American football linebacker
- Anthony Maldonado – American baseball player
- K. C. McDermott - American football player
- Shane McDermott - American football player
- Pat O'Donnell – American football punter
- Brad Peacock – baseball pitcher
- Bobby Poyner – baseball pitcher
- Cam Smith – baseball third baseman
- Suzie Toot - drag queen, contestant on RuPaul's Drag Race season 17
- Devon Travis – baseball second baseman
- Jordan Travis - American football quarterback
