= Goddard USD 265 =

Public school district in Goddard, Kansas

Address
- 201 S. Main St. Goddard, Kansas, 67052; United States
- Coordinates: 37°39′20″N 97°34′34″W

District information
- Type: Public
- Grades: Pre-K to 12
- Superintendent: Justin Henry
- School board: 7 members
- Schools: 12
- NCES District ID: 2006540
- District ID: KS-D0265

Other information
- Website: goddardusd.com

Goddard USD 265 is a public unified school district headquartered in Goddard, Kansas, United States. The district includes the communities of Goddard, Schulte, and nearby rural areas.

== Schools ==
The school district operates the following schools:

High Schools

- Eisenhower High School, 9-12
- Goddard High School, 9-12
- Goddard Academy, 9-12

Middle Schools

- Eisenhower Middle School, 7-8
- Goddard Middle School, 7-8

Intermediate Schools

- Challenger Intermediate School, 5-6
- Discovery Intermediate School, 5-6

Elementary Schools

- Amelia Earhart Elementary School, K-4
- Clark Davidson Elementary School, PreK-4
- Apollo Elementary School, K-4
- Explorer Elementary School, PreK-4
- Oak Street Elementary School, K-4

== Censorship ==
In November 2021, the school district removed 29 books from circulation from the district's school libraries, including The Handmaid’s Tale and The Hate U Give, after one parent objected to language he found offensive. Soon the books were available again, because of the district policy "Challenged materials shall not be removed from use during the review period".

== See also ==
- Kansas State Department of Education
- Kansas State High School Activities Association
- List of high schools in Kansas
- List of unified school districts in Kansas
