= Pat O'Donnell =

American football player (born 1991)

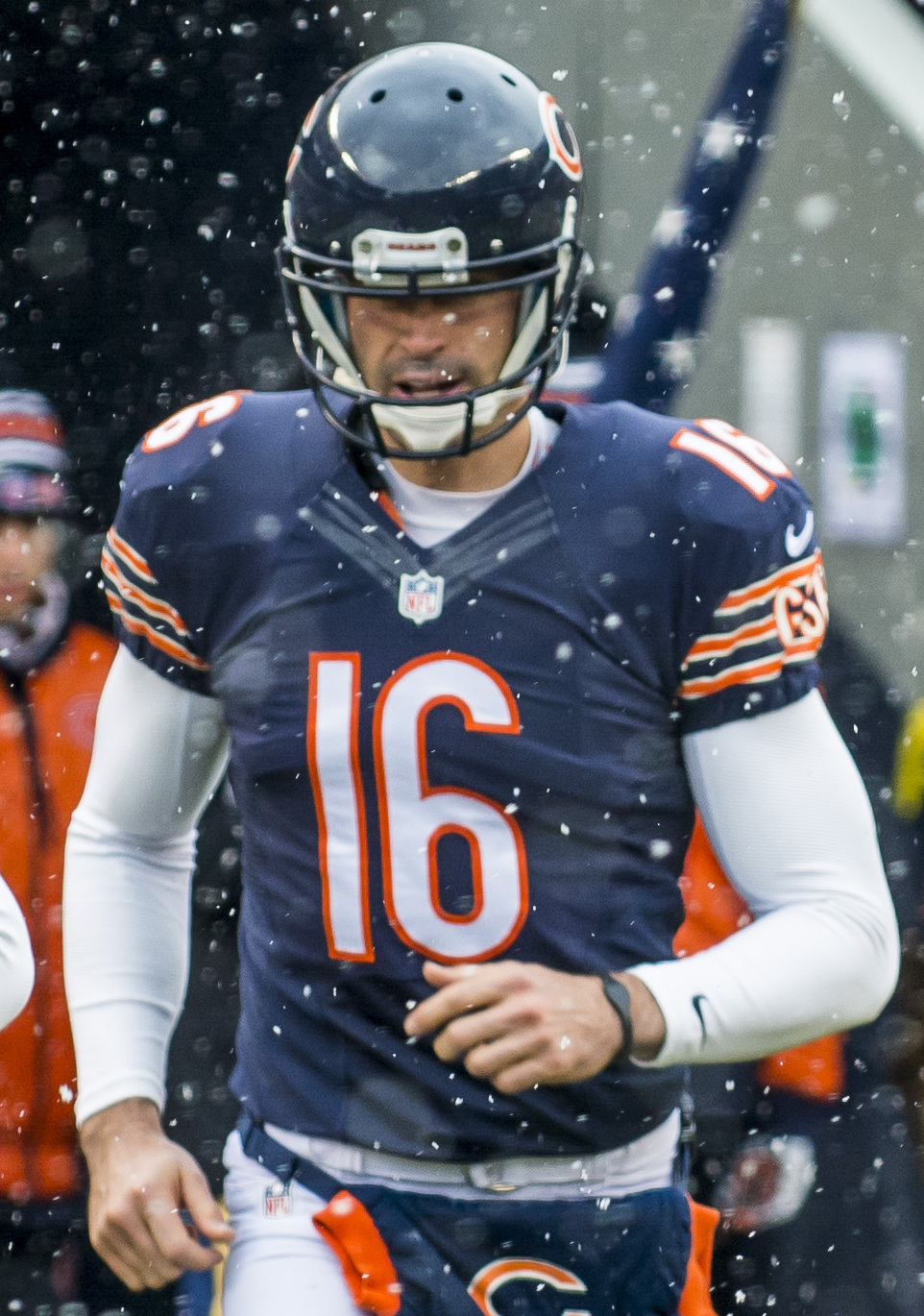
- O'Donnell with the Chicago Bears in 2014

Profile
- Position: Punter

Personal information
- Born: February 22, 1991 (age 35); Lake Worth Beach, Florida, U.S.
- Listed height: 6 ft 4 in (1.93 m)
- Listed weight: 223 lb (101 kg)

Career information
- High school: Palm Beach Central (Wellington, Florida)
- College: Cincinnati (2009–2012); Miami (FL) (2013)
- NFL draft: 2014: 6th round, 191st overall pick

Career history
- Chicago Bears (2014–2021); Green Bay Packers (2022); Atlanta Falcons (2023); Green Bay Packers (2023)*; San Francisco 49ers (2024); Arizona Cardinals (2025)
- * Offseason or practice squad member only

Awards and highlights
- PFWA All-Rookie Team (2014); Second-team All-American (2013); Third-team All-American (2013); First-team All-ACC (2013); First-team All-Big East (2011); Second-team All-Big East (2012)

Career NFL statistics as of 2025
- Punts: 652
- Punting yards: 29,352
- Average punt: 45.0
- Longest punt: 75
- Inside 20: 235
- Stats at Pro Football Reference

Patrick Michael O'Donnell (born February 22, 1991) is an American professional football punter. He played college football for the Cincinnati Bearcats and Miami Hurricanes before being selected by the Chicago Bears in the sixth round of the 2014 NFL draft.

== Early life ==
O'Donnell attended Palm Beach Central High School, and lettered three times in football and track for the Broncos. In high school, he averaged 45.1 yards on punts and also played kicker, having a 95 percent touchback rate when kicking off, along with making seven field goals as a senior. O'Donnell also played linebacker and tight end.

== College career ==
O'Donnell was ranked a two-star recruit by Rivals.com, and committed to the University of Cincinnati on December 29, 2008. He made his debut with the Bearcats in 2009 as a true freshman against Southeast Missouri State, and appeared in three games before suffering an injury, causing O'Donnell to redshirt.

O'Donnell served as starting punter in the 2010 and 2011 seasons. In the latter season, the Bearcats led the nation in punting average, while O'Donnell averaged 43.8 yards per punt, while leading the nation with 17 punts of 50 yards or more. He also served as kicker on kickoffs, averaging 64.2 yards per kick. O'Donnell ended 2011 with first team all-Big East honors, and was a semi-finalist for the Ray Guy Award.

In 2012, O'Donnell punted an average of 41.8 yards, and was named to second team all-Big East.

In 2013, O'Donnell transferred to the University of Miami, citing interests to remain close to family, as his father was suffering from cancer. O'Donnell ended his career with Cincinnati with a 42.6 career punting average. O'Donnell graduated from Cincinnati with a degree in organizational leadership at the end of April, before transferring to Miami as a graduate student.

With the Hurricanes, O'Donnell served as punter, kickoff specialist, and holder. O'Donnell recorded a school-record 47.1 punting average, was named first-team all-ACC and the Hurricanes' Special Teams MVP at the end of the 2013 season. O'Donnell concluded his college career with a 43.5-yard punting average.

== Professional career ==
=== Pre-draft ===
Pre-draft measurables
Height	Weight	Arm length	Hand span	40-yard dash	10-yard split	20-yard split	Vertical jump	Broad jump	Bench press
6 ft 4 1/8 in (1.93 m)	220 lb (100 kg)	32 1/2 in (0.83 m)	9 3/4 in (0.25 m)	4.64 s	1.62 s	2.73 s	30.5 in (0.77 m)	10 ft 0 in (3.05 m)	23 reps
All values from NFL Combine

At the NFL Scouting Combine, O'Donnell recorded 23 repetitions on the bench press, better than 19 running backs, 21 defensive linemen (including number one draft pick Jadeveon Clowney), and all 37 wide receivers invited.

=== Chicago Bears ===
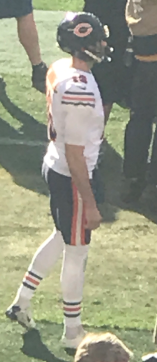
O'Donnell in 2018

O'Donnell was selected by the Chicago Bears with the 191st overall pick in the sixth round of the 2014 NFL draft, the only punter selected in the draft, and the first punter selected by the Bears since Todd Sauerbrun in 1996. O'Donnell signed a four-year contract on May 13, 2014.

In his rookie season in 2014, O'Donnell finished with 71 punts for 3,107 net yards for a 43.8 average. He was named to the PFWA All-Rookie Team.

In the 2015 season, O'Donnell punted 70 times for 3097 yards with 28 punts landing in the red zone with only four touchbacks. He ended the year with a net punting average of 39.6, the second-highest in team history since the stat began to be recorded in 1966.

In 2016, O'Donnell finished with 68 punts for 2,994 net yards for a 44.0 average.

In Week 5 of the 2017 season against the Minnesota Vikings, he threw a 38-yard touchdown pass to Benny Cunningham on a fake. Later in the year, O'Donnell served as kickoff specialist against the San Francisco 49ers while kicker Cairo Santos was nursing a groin injury. O'Donnell finished 2017 with 87 punts for 4,097 net yards for a 47.0 average.

On March 15, 2018, O'Donnell signed a one-year contract extension with the Bears worth $1.5 million. After his contract expired following the 2018 season, O'Donnell received a two-year extension on March 18, 2019.

Early in the 2019 season, O'Donnell served as kickoff specialist for the second time in Week 3 against the Washington Redskins with Eddy Piñeiro treating a knee injury. O'Donnell was also the backup kicker (with backup quarterback Chase Daniel serving as his holder), though Piñeiro kicked through his injury in the game. O'Donnell ended 2019 with a net punting average of 40.7 yards, setting the team record previously held by Adam Podlesh (40.4 in 2011).

O'Donnell signed a one-year contract extension with the Bears on March 12, 2021.

As of 2021's NFL offseason, O'Donnell held at least two Bears franchise records, including:

- Most Yards / Punt (career): 45.0
- Most Yards / Punt (season): 46.98 (2017)

=== Green Bay Packers (first stint) ===
On March 18, 2022, O'Donnell signed a two-year contract with the Green Bay Packers. He was named NFC Special Teams player of the week for his Week 3 performance against the Buccaneers in a narrow 14–12 victory, having seven punts with the longest 63 yards and an average of 48.4. Five of them landed inside the 20-yard line, the most for any of the team's punters in a game since 1976.

On August 28, 2023, O’Donnell was released by the Packers.

=== Atlanta Falcons ===
On October 28, 2023, O'Donnell was signed to the Atlanta Falcons practice squad, and elevated for Week 8. He was released two days later, then re-signed on December 22. O'Donnell was signed to the active roster that same day. He was released again on December 26.

=== Green Bay Packers (second stint) ===
On January 20, 2024, O'Donnell was signed to the Packers practice squad. He was not signed to a reserve/future contract after the season and thus became a free agent when his practice squad contract expired.

=== San Francisco 49ers ===
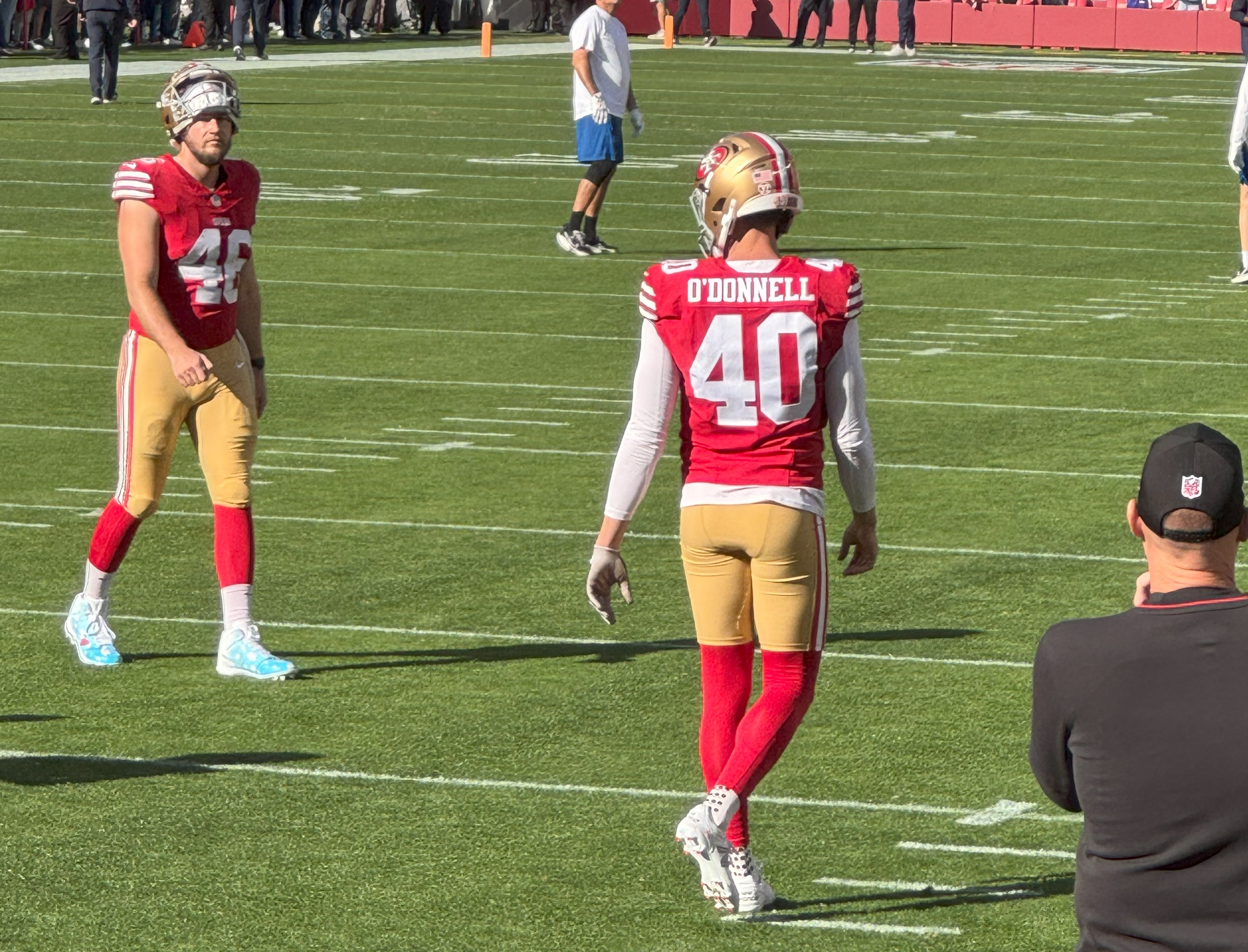
O'Donnell (right) with 49ers long snapper Taybor Pepper in 2024

On November 13, 2024, O'Donnell was signed to the San Francisco 49ers practice squad. On November 16, O'Donnell was promoted to the active roster.

=== Arizona Cardinals ===
On October 10, 2025, O'Donnell signed with the Arizona Cardinals. He was released by the Cardinals on November 18.

== Career statistics ==
=== NFL ===
==== Regular season ====
Year	Team	GP	Punting							
Year	Team	GP	Punts	Yds	Lng	Avg	Net Avg	Blk	Ins20	RetY
2014	CHI	16	71	3,107	61	43.8	37.7	0	20	335
2015	CHI	15	70	3,097	72	44.2	39.7	1	28	197
2016	CHI	16	68	2,994	67	44.0	38.4	1	24	282
2017	CHI	16	87	4,087	69	47.0	39.7	0	27	512
2018	CHI	16	62	2,791	65	45.0	39.7	0	28	150
2019	CHI	16	80	3,586	75	44.8	40.7	1	26	247
2020	CHI	16	64	2,924	64	45.7	39.5	1	28	294
2021	CHI	17	62	2,865	72	46.2	38.5	0	19	375
2022	GB	17	52	2,313	72	44.5	38.8	2	24	196
2024	SF	8	24	1,082	56	45.1	40.0	0	8	101
2025	ARI	5	12	506	49	42.2	36.2	1	3	15
Career		158	652	29,352	75	45.0	39.2	7	235	2,704

==== Postseason ====
Year	Team	GP	Punting				
Year	Team	GP	Punts	Yds	Avg	Lng	Blk
2018	CHI	1	6	243	40.5	49	0
2020	CHI	1	7	281	40.1	49	0
Career		2	13	524	40.3	49	0

=== College ===
Season	GP	Punting					
Season	GP	Punts	Yds	Avg	Lng	I20	50+
2009	3	7	265	37.9	50	2	1
2010	12	52	2,178	41.9	61	16	6
2011	13	63	2,760	43.8	76	26	17
2012	13	59	2,467	41.8	65	23	10
2013	13	53	2,498	47.1	71	11	23
Career	54	234	10,168	43.5	76	78	57

== Personal life ==
O'Donnell was born the oldest of 2 children to Terrance and Michele O'Donnell. His sister, Megan, was an All-American rower and National Champion at Nova Southeastern University. His cousin, Christopher Bordino, was a member of the Navy Midshipmen track team.

In February 2019, O'Donnell became engaged to Shelby Etter. In March 2020, they got married in Miami.
