= Shane McDermott =

American football player (born 1992)

No. 64
- Position: Center

Personal information
- Born: February 18, 1992 (age 34); Lake Worth Beach, Florida, U.S.
- Listed height: 6 ft 3 in (1.91 m)
- Listed weight: 305 lb (138 kg)

Career information
- High school: Wellington (FL) Palm Beach Central
- College: Miami
- NFL draft: 2015: undrafted

Career history
- Dallas Cowboys (2015)*; Carolina Panthers (2015)*; New York Giants (2015–2016)*; Dallas Cowboys (2016)*; New York Giants (2016)
- * Offseason or practice squad member only

Awards and highlights
- All-ACC (2014)

Career NFL statistics
- Games played: 2
- Stats at Pro Football Reference

Shane McDermott (born February 18, 1992) is an American former professional football player who was a center in the National Football League (NFL) for the Carolina Panthers, New York Giants and Dallas Cowboys. He played college football for the Miami Hurricanes.

== Early life ==
McDermott attended Palm Beach Central High School. As a senior, he was a starter at center, receiving All-conference, All-area by the Palm Beach Post and All-Broward by the Sun-Sentinel honors.

== College career ==
McDermott accepted a football scholarship from the University of Miami. As a redshirt freshman, he appeared in 10 games as a backup at center.

As a sophomore, he started all 12 games at center. He was part of the third passing offense (295.4) and fifth total offense (440.2) in the Atlantic Coast Conference. He was awarded the Walter Kichefski Endowed Football Scholarship.

As a junior, he started 11 games at center. He missed the third and fourth games because of an injury.

As a senior, he started in all 13 games at center. He finished his college career after playing in 46 games with 36 starts.

== Professional career ==
=== Dallas Cowboys (first stint) ===
McDermott was signed as an undrafted free agent by the Dallas Cowboys after the 2015 NFL draft on May 8. He was released by the Cowboys on September 5, during final roster cuts.

=== Carolina Panthers ===
On September 9, 2015, McDermott was signed to the Panthers' practice squad but was released the following week.

=== New York Giants (first stint) ===
On November 18, 2015, McDermott was signed to the Giants' practice squad. He signed a reserve/future contract on January 1, 2016 and was released by the Giants on August 30, 2016 and was signed to the practice squad. He was released on September 21, 2016.

=== Dallas Cowboys (second stint) ===
On September 22, 2016, McDermott was signed to the Cowboys' practice squad and was released on October 11, 2016.

=== New York Giants (second stint) ===
On November 17, 2016, McDermott was signed to the Giants practice squad and was promoted to the active roster two days later. He was released by the Giants on December 3, 2016.

== Personal life ==
He is from Lake Worth Beach, and his brother K. C. McDermott played offensive tackle for the Jacksonville Jaguars and Houston Texans in the NFL.
