= Logan Watkins =

American baseball player (born 1989)

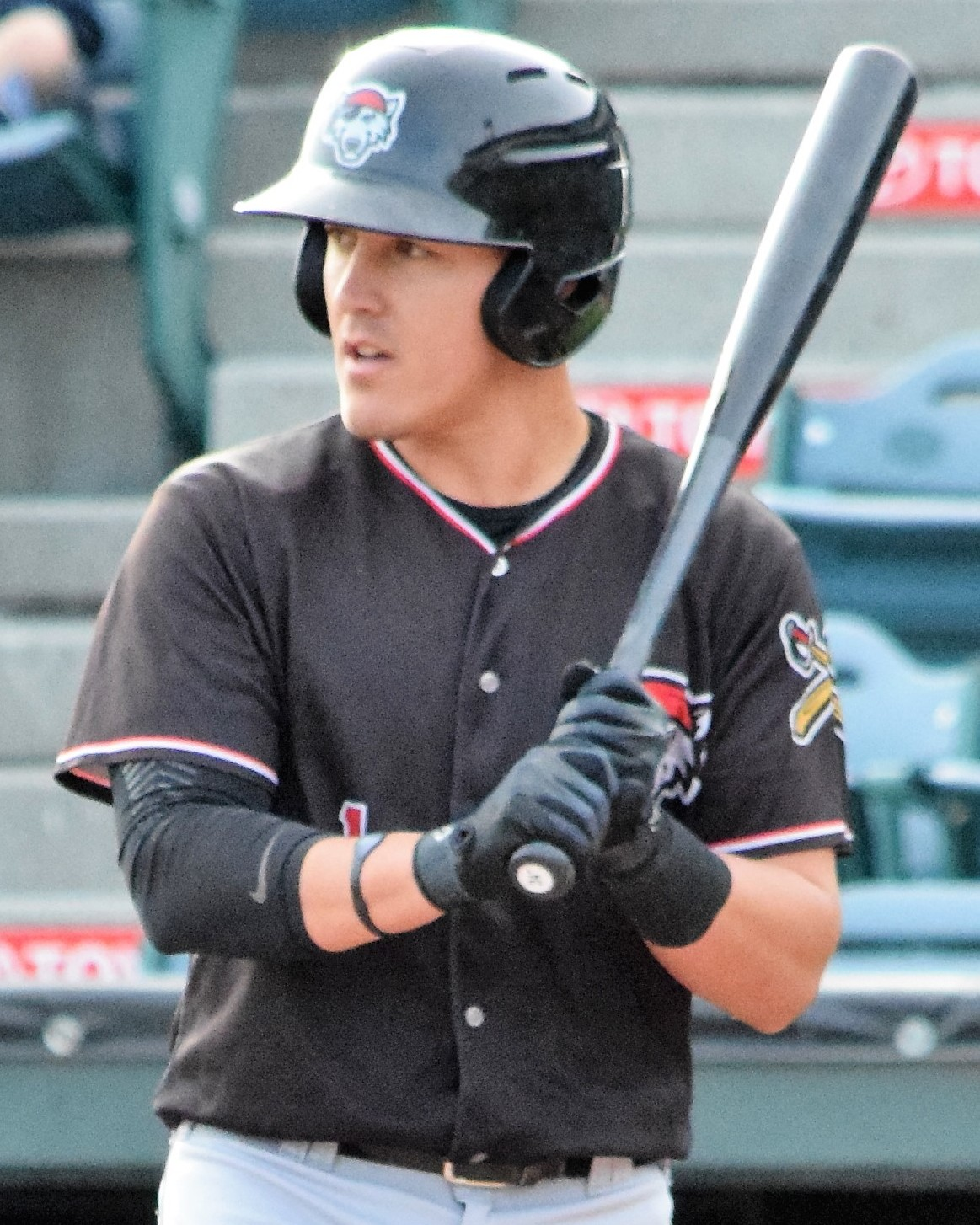
- Watkins with the Erie SeaWolves in 2017

Winnipeg Goldeyes – No. 14
- Second baseman / Manager
- Born: August 29, 1989 (age 36); Wichita, Kansas, U.S.
- Batted: Left Threw: Right

MLB debut
- August 4, 2013, for the Chicago Cubs

Last MLB appearance
- September 28, 2014, for the Chicago Cubs

MLB statistics
- Batting average: .233
- Home runs: 1
- Runs batted in: 6
- Stats at Baseball Reference

Teams
- Chicago Cubs (2013–2014)

Vincent Logan Watkins (born August 29, 1989) is an American professional baseball coach and former infielder who is currently the manager for the Winnipeg Goldeyes of the American Association of Professional Baseball. He played in Major League Baseball (MLB) for the Chicago Cubs.

== Early life ==
Watkins attended Goddard High School in Goddard, Kansas, where he played football as a quarterback and baseball.

== Professional career ==
=== Chicago Cubs ===
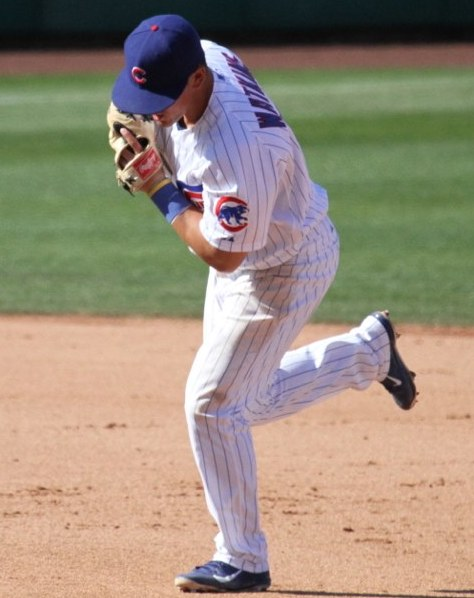
Watkins with the Cubs during spring training in 2013

Watkins was drafted by the Chicago Cubs in the 21st round of the 2008 Major League Baseball draft, and signed with the team on June 27, 2008, receiving a reported signing bonus of $600,000. He made his professional debut with the rookie-level AZL Cubs, and hit .325/.462/.363 in 27 games. In 2009, Watkins played in 72 games for the Low-A Boise Hawks, and recorded a .326/.389/.391 slash with 29 RBI. The following year, Watkins played for the Single-A Peoria Chiefs, batting .261/.351/.339 with 1 home run and 30 RBI. In 2011, Watkins played for the High-A Daytona Cubs, setting career-highs in home runs (5) and RBI (45). For the 2012 season, Watkins played for the Double-A Tennessee Smokies, slashing .281/.383/.422 with new career-highs in home runs (9) and RBI (52). Watkins was named the Cubs' minor league player of the year in 2012 and the Cubs added him to their 40-man roster after the season. He was assigned to the Triple-A Iowa Cubs to begin the 2013 season. On August 4, 2013, the Cubs promoted Watkins to the major leagues and made his debut as the starting second baseman against the Los Angeles Dodgers, going 1-for-4. He finished his rookie season 8-for-38 (.211) with no home runs or RBI. Watkins hit .246 with a home run and 6 RBI in 65 at-bats with the Cubs in 2014.

Watkins was designated for assignment by the Cubs on December 19, 2014, and was outrighted three days later. On February 4, 2015, Watkins suffered a torn Achilles tendon while working out, and missed the entire season as a result.

In 2016, Watkins played for Triple–A Iowa, hitting .261/.314/.353 with one home run and 42 RBI in 108 games. He elected free agency following the season on November 7, 2016.

=== Detroit Tigers ===
On December 23, 2016, Watkins signed a minor league contract with the Detroit Tigers organization. He split the 2017 season between the Triple-A Toledo Mud Hens and the Double-A Erie SeaWolves, posting a .242/.343/.300 slash line with 2 home runs and 21 RBI in 86 games between the two teams. He elected free agency following the season on November 6, 2017.

=== Wichita Wingnuts ===
On March 26, 2018, Watkins signed with the Wichita Wingnuts of the American Association. Watkins set the Wingnuts franchise single season record for hits with 142. In 100 games for the Wingnuts, Watkins hit .338/.403/.469 with 3 home runs and 51 RBI.

=== Toros de Tijuana ===
On December 13, 2018, Watkins signed with the Toros de Tijuana of the Mexican League for the 2019 season. In 69 games with Tijuana in 2019, Watkins slashed .254/.364/.393 with 3 home runs and 16 RBI.

=== Olmecas de Tabasco ===
On January 7, 2020, Watkins was traded to the Olmecas de Tabasco of the Mexican League in exchange for Humberto Castro. However, he did not appear in a game for the club as the 2020 season was canceled due to the COVID-19 pandemic.

== Coaching career ==
=== Cleburne Railroaders ===
On April 5, 2021, Watkins was announced as the new hitting coach for the Cleburne Railroaders of the American Association of Professional Baseball. On June 30, Watkins was named the interim manager for the club after Mike Jeffcoat announced his retirement.

=== Winnipeg Goldeyes ===
On November 1, 2023, Watkins was named the manager of the Winnipeg Goldeyes of the American Association of Professional Baseball.
