= Schulte, Kansas =

Unincorporated community in Sedgwick County, Kansas

- Unincorporated community
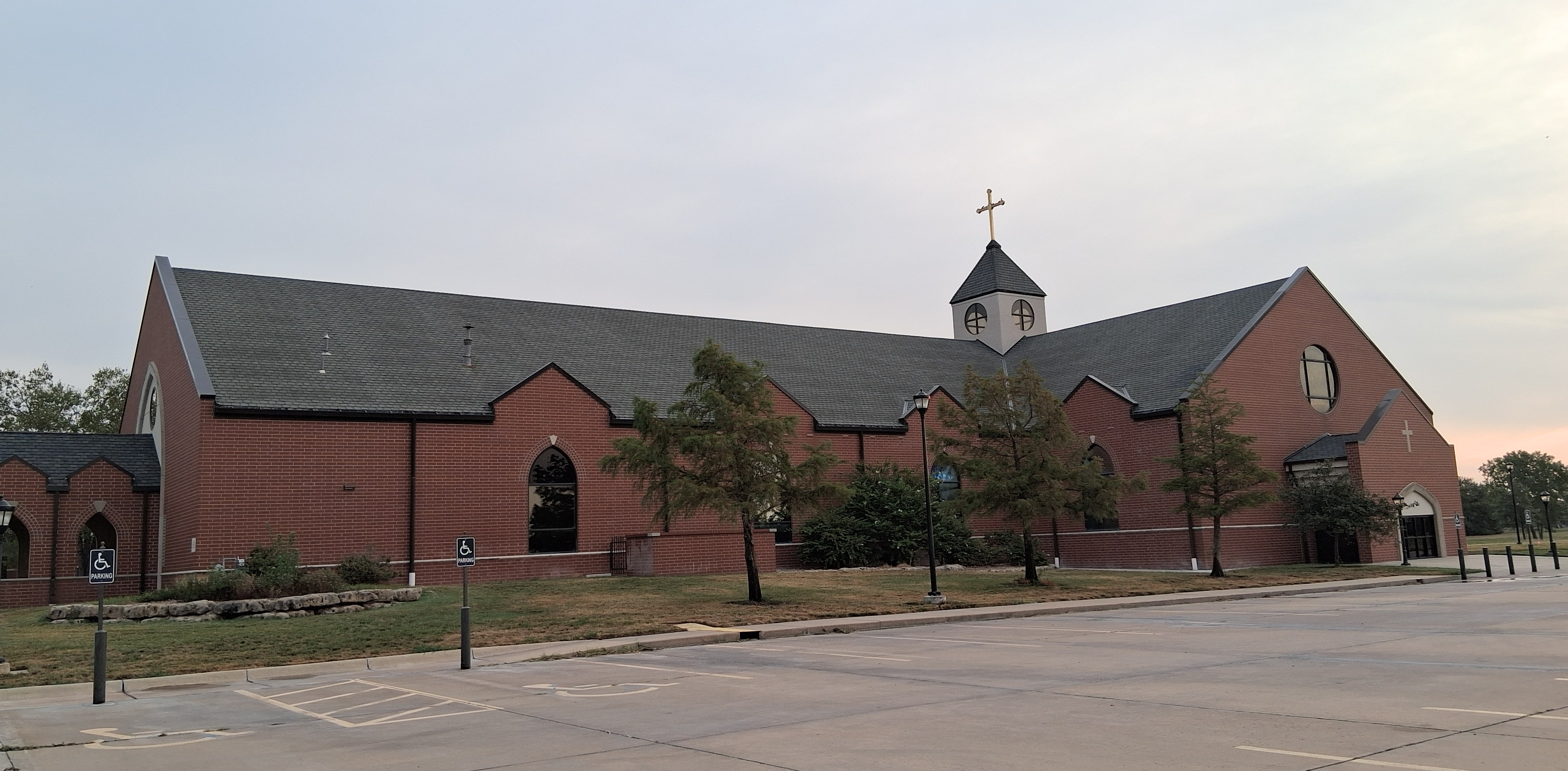
- St. Peter the Apostle Catholic Church in 2026

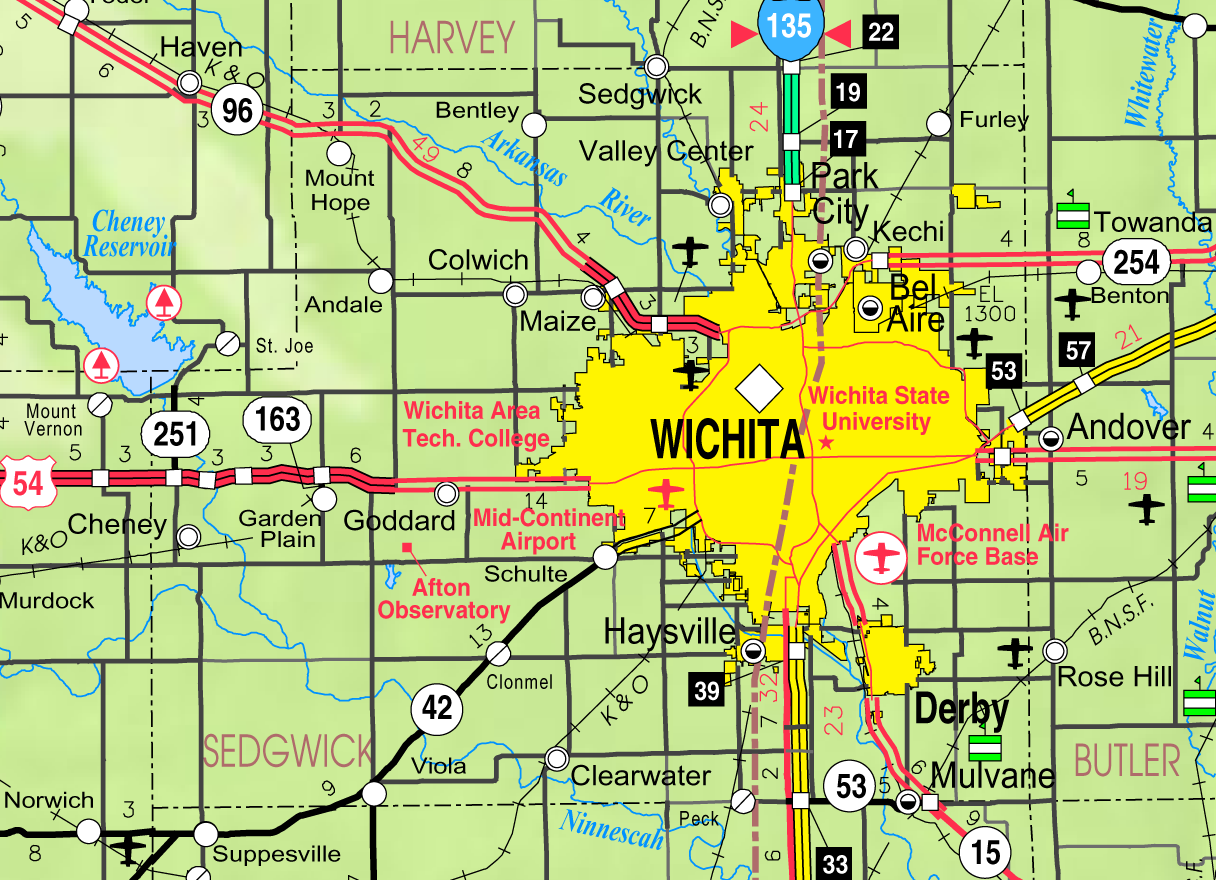
- KDOT map of Sedgwick County (legend)

- Location within Kansas Location within the United States
- Coordinates: 37°37′23″N 97°28′17″W
- Country: United States
- State: Kansas
- County: Sedgwick
- Elevation: 1,335 ft (407 m)
- Time zone: UTC-6 (CST)
  - Summer (DST): UTC-5 (CDT)
- Area code: 316
- FIPS code: 20-63450
- GNIS ID: 474320

Schulte is an unincorporated community in Sedgwick County, Kansas, United States. It is located at K-42 (Southwest Boulevard) and MacArthur Rd.

== History ==
Schulte got its start following construction of the Orient Railway through the territory. Schulte had a post office from 1906 to 1934.

== Education ==
The community is served by Goddard USD 265 public school district.

== Transportation ==
The Atchison, Topeka and Santa Fe Railway formerly provided passenger rail service to Schulte on a line between Wichita and Englewood. Dedicated passenger service was provided until at least 1958, while mixed trains continued until at least 1961. As of 2025, the nearest passenger rail station is located in Newton, where Amtrak's Southwest Chief stops once daily on a route from Chicago to Los Angeles.

== See also ==
- Lake Afton
