= Brad Peacock =

American baseball player (born 1988)

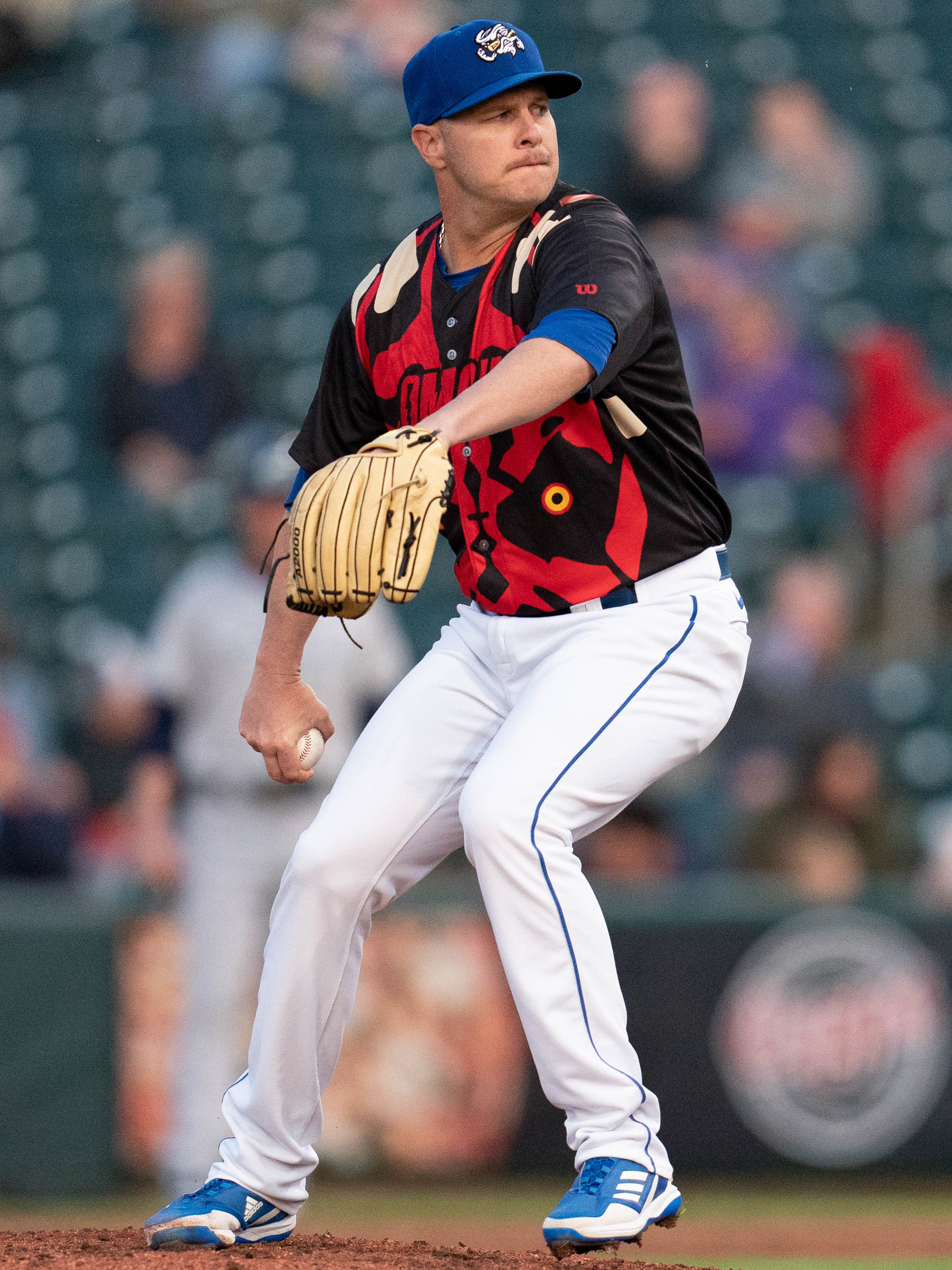
- Peacock with the Omaha Storm Chasers in 2022
- Pitcher
- Born: February 2, 1988 (age 38); West Palm Beach, Florida, U.S.
- Batted: Right Threw: Right

MLB debut
- September 6, 2011, for the Washington Nationals

Last MLB appearance
- September 7, 2021, for the Boston Red Sox

MLB statistics
- Win–loss record: 34–31
- Earned run average: 4.11
- Strikeouts: 590
- Stats at Baseball Reference

Teams
- Washington Nationals (2011); Houston Astros (2013–2020); Boston Red Sox (2021)

Career highlights and awards
- World Series champion (2017)

Bradley Joseph Peacock (born February 2, 1988) is an American former professional baseball pitcher. He played in Major League Baseball (MLB) for the Washington Nationals, Houston Astros, and Boston Red Sox. Listed at 6 feet 1 inch (1.85 m) and 207 pounds (94 kg), he throws and bats right-handed.

== Amateur career ==
Peacock attended Palm Beach Central High School in Wellington, Florida. He played for the school's baseball team as a third baseman. Peacock requested that his coach try him at pitcher, and he threw eight innings in high school prior to pitching in a summer league. He committed to attend Florida Atlantic University to play college baseball with the Florida Atlantic Owls.

The Washington Nationals selected Peacock in the 41st round of the 2006 Major League Baseball draft. They did not immediately sign Peacock, but retained his rights as a "draft-and-follow" player. He enrolled at Palm Beach Community College, and had an 8–0 win–loss record as a starting pitcher for the baseball team.

== Professional career ==
=== Washington Nationals ===
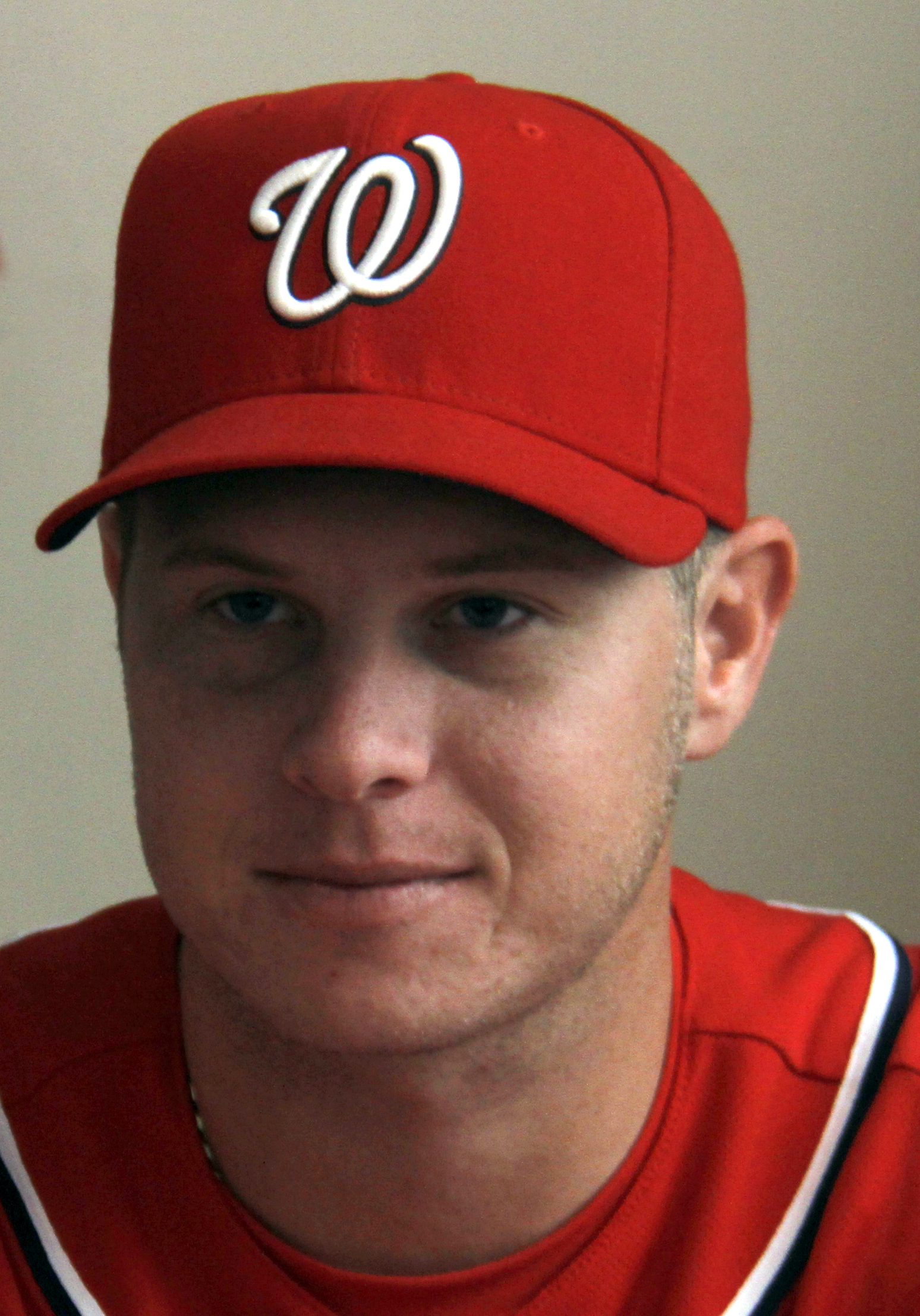
Peacock in 2011

After the college baseball season, the Nationals signed Peacock to a $110,000 signing bonus. He spent the 2007 season with the GCL Nationals, Washington's affiliate in the rookie-level Gulf Coast League, accruing a record of 1 win and 1 loss and a 3.89 earned run average. Over 39 1/3 innings in 2007, consisting of seven starts and six appearances in relief, Peacock struck out a total of 34 batters and issued 15 bases on balls. In 2010, he made eight starts for the Harrisburg Senators of the Double–A Eastern League. After the 2010 season, Peacock played in the Arizona Fall League as a relief pitcher, and his fastball was measured at 97 miles per hour (156 km/h).

Baseball America rated Peacock the 42nd best prospect in baseball during the 2011 season. He represented the Nationals at the 2011 All-Star Futures Game. He was named a starting pitcher on Baseball America's 2011 Minor League All Star team.

Peacock began the 2011 season with Harrisburg and also played for the Syracuse Chiefs of the Triple–A International League. He was promoted to the majors and made his MLB debut on September 6, 2011. He earned his first major league win on September 14.

=== Oakland Athletics ===
On December 23, 2011, Peacock was traded with Tommy Milone, Derek Norris, and A. J. Cole to the Oakland Athletics for Gio González and Robert Gilliam. He pitched for the Sacramento River Cats of the Triple–A Pacific Coast League in 2012, and did not play in the major leagues for the Athletics.

=== Houston Astros ===
After the 2012 season, the Athletics traded Peacock to the Houston Astros with Max Stassi and Chris Carter for Jed Lowrie and Fernando Rodriguez. He spent the entire season at the Triple–A level.

Peacock began the 2013 season at the Triple–A level before being called up by the Astros. He pitched to a 5.18 ERA in 83 1/3 innings. In 2014, he pitched a career-high 24 starts (28 games total), finishing 4–9 in 131 2/3 innings.

Peacock was out of options in 2017, and so could not be sent to the minor leagues. He began the season as a relief pitcher, with a 1.10 ERA in 16 1/3 innings pitched, and received a spot start on May 22 in place of the injured Dallas Keuchel. Following a start in which Peacock allowed one hit and no runs in 4 1/3 innings, Peacock replaced Mike Fiers in the starting rotation.

The Astros won the American League West with 101 wins, and faced the Los Angeles Dodgers in the World Series. In Game 3, Peacock earned his first major league save by completing the final 3 2/3 innings of a 5−3 win, allowing no hits and striking out four. It was the longest hitless relief outing since Ron Taylor's four innings in Game 4 of the 1964 World Series, and tied Ken Clay for the longest hitless postseason save, first accomplished in the 1978 American League Championship Series (ALCS). The Astros would then win the 2017 World Series, their first in franchise history.

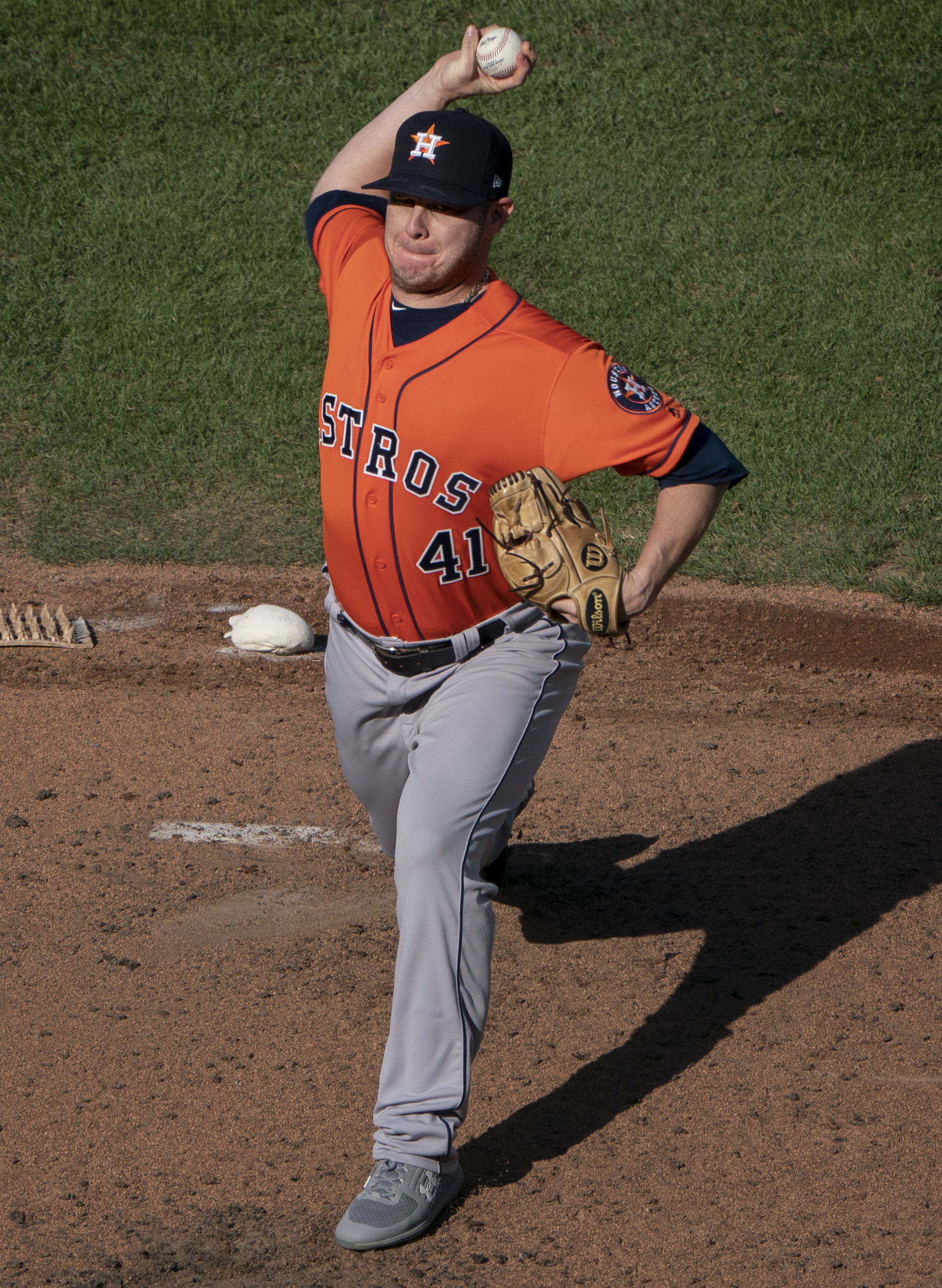
Peacock in 2018

In 2018, Peacock pitched the whole season out of the bullpen, totaling 61 appearances. He struck out 96 batters in 65 innings. He was 3–5 with three saves and had a 3.46 ERA.

On May 8, 2019, Peacock threw a career-high 12 strikeouts in 7 innings against the Kansas City Royals. In 2019 he was 7–6 with a 4.12 ERA, and struck out 96 batters in 91 2/3 innings. Peacock only appeared in 3 games for the Astros in 2020, registering a 7.71 ERA with 3 strikeouts in 2 1/3 innings of work. He was recognized by the Houston chapter of the Baseball Writers' Association of America (BBWAA) as the recipient of the Darryl Kile Good Guy Award. He became a free agent after the season.

=== Cleveland Indians ===
On June 25, 2021, the Cleveland Indians signed Peacock to a minor-league contract. He was assigned to the Columbus Clippers of the Triple-A East. Peacock made 11 appearances for Columbus, going 0–4 with a 7.68 ERA and 38 strikeouts in 34 innings.

=== Boston Red Sox ===
On August 30, 2021, Peacock was traded to the Boston Red Sox in exchange for cash considerations. The following day, the Red Sox selected Peacock's contract; he started that evening's game against the Tampa Bay Rays, taking the loss after allowing five runs on two hits in 2 1/3 innings. He was subsequently returned to the Triple-A Worcester Red Sox and removed from the 40-man roster. He made two relief appearances with Worcester; in two innings pitched, he allowed three runs while striking out three batters. On November 7, Peacock elected free agency.

=== Kansas City Royals ===
On March 8, 2022, Peacock signed a minor league contract with the Kansas City Royals. On July 18, he was released by the Royals.

=== Minnesota Twins ===
On July 29, 2022, Peacock signed a minor league contract with the Minnesota Twins. In 20 appearances for the Triple-A St. Paul Saints, he posted a 3-3 record and 3.38 ERA with 22 strikeouts and 8 saves across 21 1/3 innings pitched. Peacock elected free agency following the season on November 10.

== Coaching career ==
On March 12, 2024, Peacock was hired to serve as the pitching coach at his alma mater, Palm Beach Central High School.

== Personal life ==
Peacock's father, Jerry, converted a trailer into a camper in order to follow Brad in the minor leagues. Peacock and his wife, Stephanie, had a son in June 2017.
