= Derek Norris =

American baseball player (born 1989)

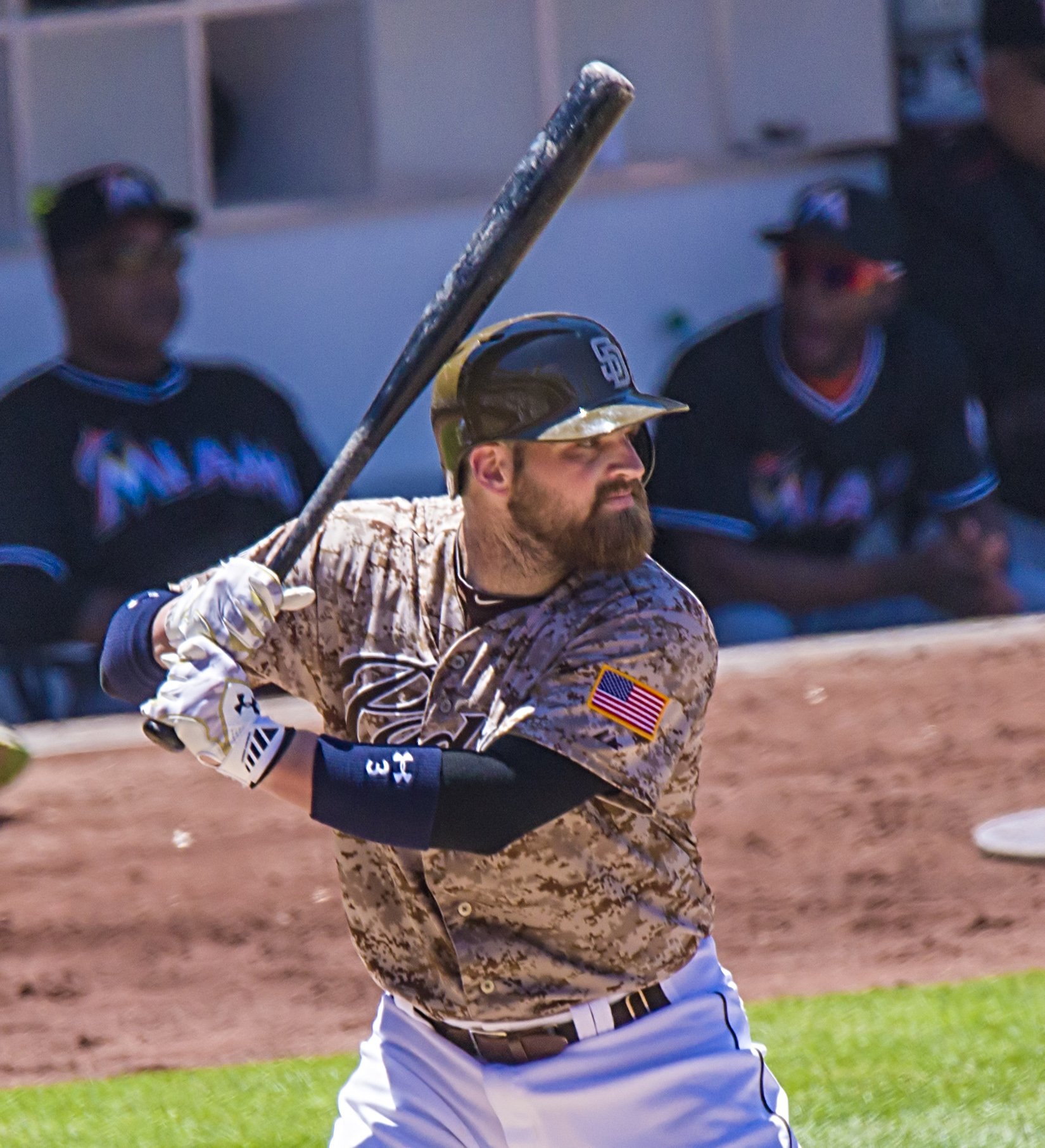
- Norris batting the San Diego Padres in 2015
- Catcher
- Born: February 14, 1989 (age 37); Goddard, Kansas, U.S.
- Batted: Right Threw: Right

MLB debut
- June 21, 2012, for the Oakland Athletics

Last MLB appearance
- June 23, 2017, for the Tampa Bay Rays

MLB statistics
- Batting average: .230
- Home runs: 63
- Runs batted in: 247
- Stats at Baseball Reference

Teams
- Oakland Athletics (2012–2014); San Diego Padres (2015–2016); Tampa Bay Rays (2017)

Career highlights and awards
- All-Star (2014)

Derek Russell Norris (born February 14, 1989) is an American former professional baseball catcher. He played in Major League Baseball (MLB) for the Oakland Athletics, San Diego Padres, and Tampa Bay Rays. Prior to playing professionally, Norris attended Goddard High School. After signing and spending a few seasons in the Washington Nationals' minor-league system, he was traded to the Oakland Athletics at the end of the 2011 season.

He made his MLB debut in 2012 for the Athletics before making his sole All-Star appearance two seasons later. The Athletics traded Norris to the San Diego Padres at the end of the season. He spent two seasons with the Padres, reaching career high statistics in runs, RBI, and home runs in 2015. The Nationals acquired Norris at the end of the 2016 season. Norris was granted free agency by the Nationals with the Tampa Bay Rays signing him. He was designated for assignment midway through the 2017 season, and after being released, he was suspended for the rest of the season due to domestic violence allegations.

Norris signed a minor-league contract with the Detroit Tigers after the end of the 2017 season before being released a few months later. In April 2018, he signed with the Sugar Land Skeeters, an independent league team. He became a free agent at the end of the season.

== Background ==
Norris graduated from Goddard High School in Goddard, Kansas in 2007. At Goddard High, Norris played third base before transitioning to catcher, and also won a Class 6A Championship title. RISE Magazine named Norris its 2006–2007 Kansas Baseball Player of the Year. He committed to attend Wichita State University on a baseball scholarship.

== Professional career ==
=== Washington Nationals ===
The Washington Nationals selected Norris in the fourth round of the 2007 Major League Baseball draft.

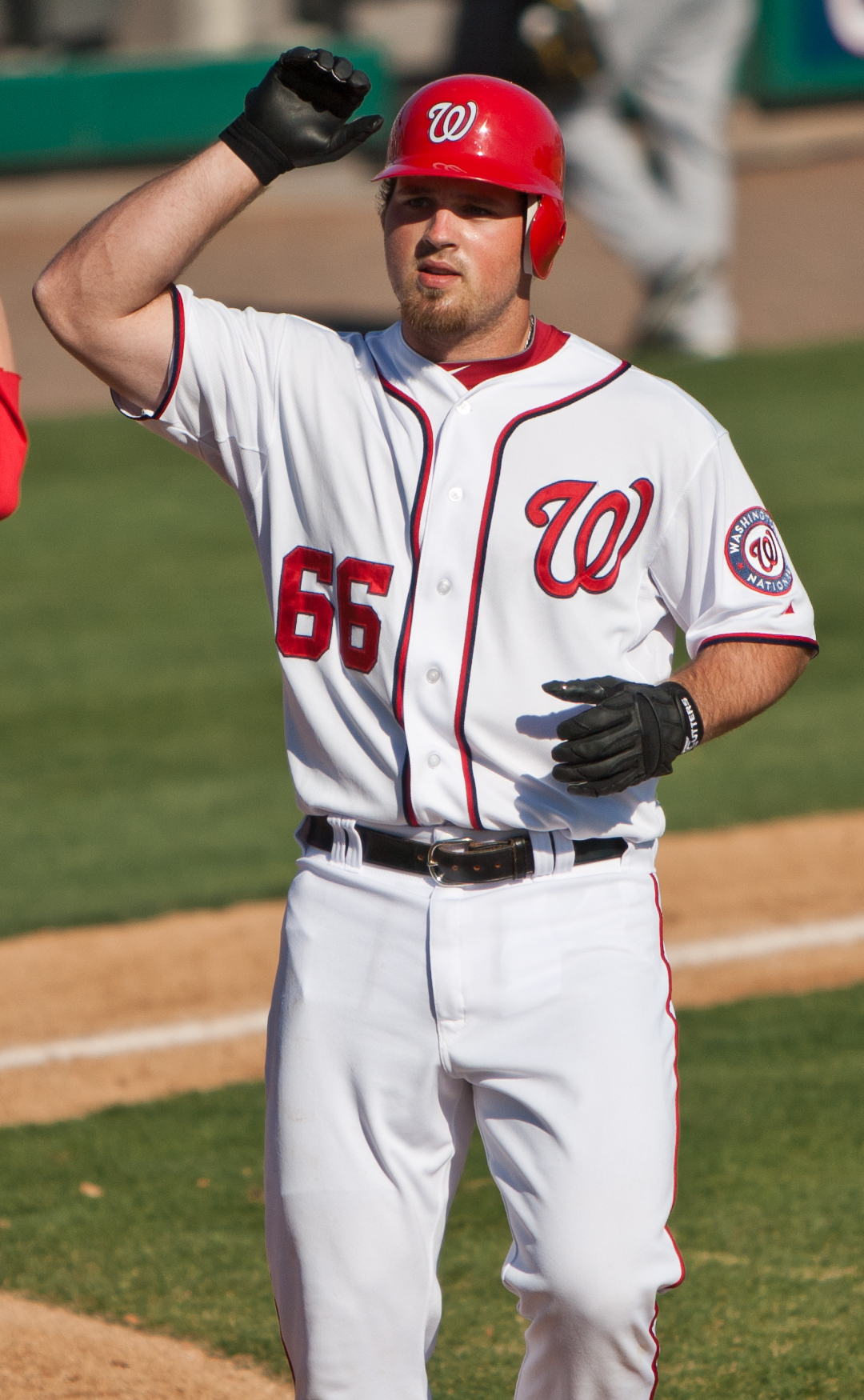
Norris with the Washington Nationals in 2011 spring training

Norris spent the 2007 season with the GCL Nationals, Washington's affiliate in the rookie-level Gulf Coast League. He played for the Vermont Lake Monsters of the New York–Penn League in 2008, the Hagerstown Suns of the Single–A South Atlantic League in 2009, the Potomac Nationals of the High–A Carolina League in 2010, and the Harrisburg Senators of the Double–A Eastern League in 2011. Baseball America rated Norris the 38th best prospect in baseball prior to the 2010 season and the 72nd best prospect in baseball prior to the 2011 season. He was also chosen as the Nationals' second best prospect prior to the 2011 season.

=== Oakland Athletics ===
On December 23, 2011, the Nationals traded Norris, A. J. Cole, Tommy Milone, and Brad Peacock to the Oakland Athletics for Gio González and Robert Gilliam.

Norris made his MLB debut for the Athletics on June 21, 2012. He was called up to be a backup catcher behind offensively struggling catcher Kurt Suzuki. He went 0 for 3, but made a key defensive play in the ninth inning throwing out Dodgers Dee Gordon attempting to steal second base. On June 24, 2012, the Athletics were trailing 2-1 against the San Francisco Giants when Norris hit his first career home run, and first career walk-off home run. The three-run home run helped the Athletics defeat the Giants, 4–2. When Suzuki was traded to the Washington Nationals on August 3, Norris became the primary catcher for the team, backed up by the newly acquired George Kottaras. Norris finished the 2012 season batting a slash line of .201/.276/.349, with 7 home runs across 209 at bats and 53 starts at catcher.

In 2013, Norris was the primary catcher in a catching platoon, backed up by left-handed hitters John Jaso and Stephen Vogt. Norris missed portions of August and September with a broken toe. He started 71 games at catcher and played in 98 games overall, hitting a slash line of .246/.345/.409 with 9 home runs and 30 RBI.

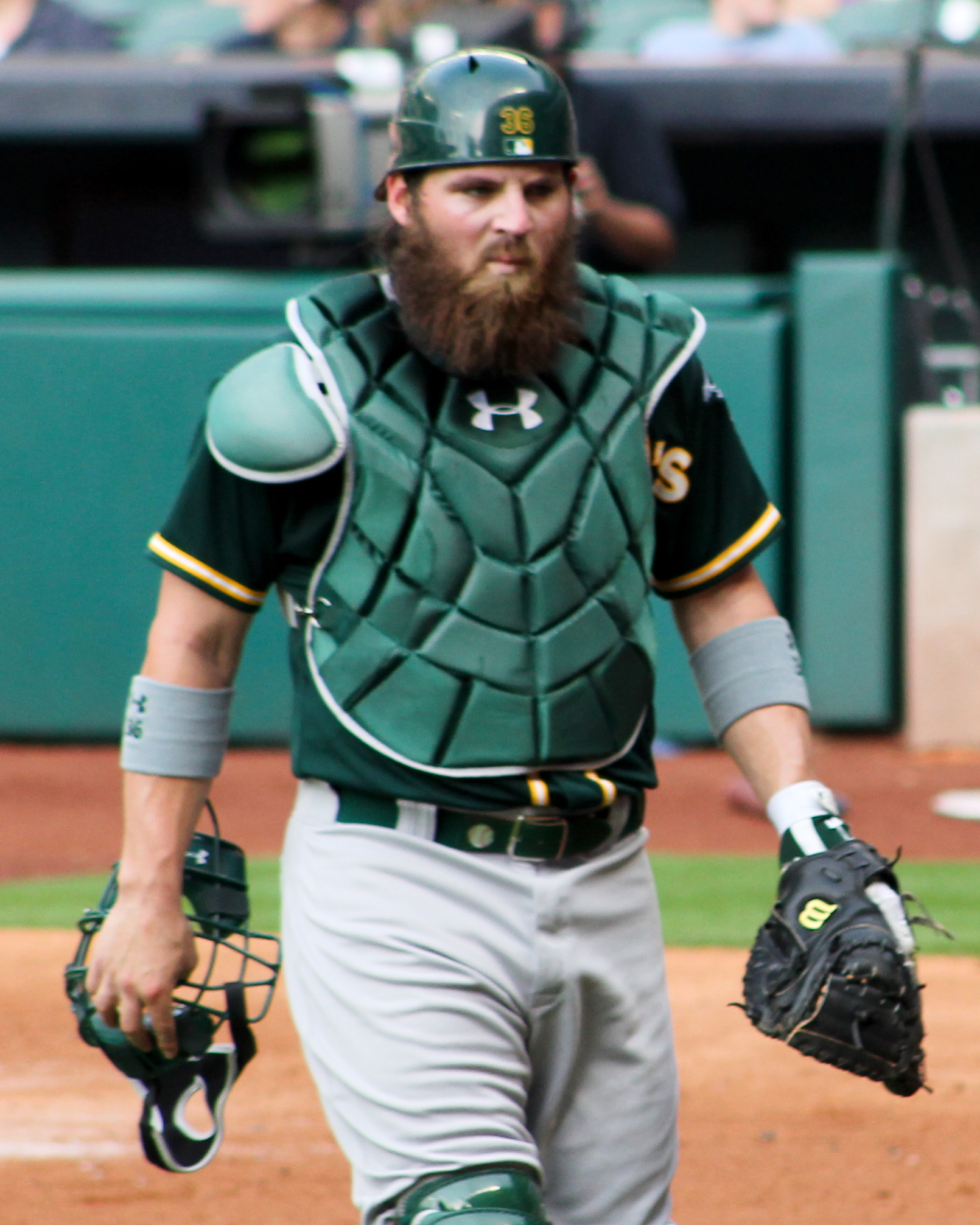
Norris playing for the Oakland Athletics in 2014

Norris was selected to play in the 2014 MLB All-Star Game, his first and only career appearance in an All-Star game. He hit a slash line of .270/.361/.403 with 10 home runs across 385 at-bats, while making 93 starts at catcher with John Jaso as a back-up. The Athletics would qualify for the postseason against the Kansas City Royals in the Wild Card game. The game lasted for 12 innings before the Athletics ultimately fell to the Royals, 9-8.

=== San Diego Padres ===
On December 18, 2014, the Athletics traded Norris and Seth Streich to the San Diego Padres in exchange for R. J. Alvarez and Jesse Hahn. Norris played in a career high 147 games in 2015, including 116 starts at catcher and 15 starts at first base. Despite moving to the National League, Norris racked up career highs in runs, RBIs, and home runs, and batted .250/.305/.404. Defensively, he threw out 34% of would-be base stealers and his pitch-framing was reported to be much improved from previous years.

In 2016, Norris struggled at the plate, posting a .186(career low)/.255/.328 slash line. Norris finished the season with 14 home runs, tying a career high, and 42 RBI. Defensively, baserunners stole a league-leading 76 bases against him. Despite the Padres pushing to trade Norris at the July 31 deadline, Norris remained with the team.

=== Washington Nationals (second stint) ===
On December 2, 2016, the Washington Nationals acquired Norris from the Padres in exchange for Pedro Ávila. Norris and the Nationals avoided arbitration over the winter, agreeing to a $4.2 million contract for 2017. After the team signed free agent catcher Matt Wieters, the Nationals reportedly attempted to trade Norris but were unable to find a taker. The Nationals granted Norris his unconditional release on March 15, 2017, rendering him a free agent eligible to sign with any team and allowing the team to pay only one-sixth of Norris' 2017 salary.

=== Tampa Bay Rays ===
On March 25, 2017, Norris signed a one-year contract with the Tampa Bay Rays. He was designated for assignment on June 23, and released two days later. For the Rays, Norris batted .201/.258/.380 with nine home runs and 24 RBI. On September 1, Norris was suspended for the remainder of the season for violating MLB's personal conduct policy, regarding a domestic violence case against his former fiancée. In an Instagram post, his former fiancée stated that Norris verbally and physically abused her and assaulted her in 2015. Norris denied the allegations and there was an investigation by MLB. He did not appeal his suspension, and forfeited the remaining $100,000 that was owed to him by the Rays.

=== Sugar Land Skeeters ===
On December 5, 2017, Norris signed a minor league contract with the Detroit Tigers. He was released prior to the start of the season on March 28, 2018.

On April 14, 2018, Norris signed with the Sugar Land Skeeters of the Atlantic League of Professional Baseball. In 117 appearances for Sugar Land, he batted .256/.379/.402 with 12 home runs and 57 RBI in 410 at-bats. Norris became a free agent following the season.
