= Eisenhower High School (Kansas) =

Location
- 1230 South 167th Street West; Goddard, Kansas 67052; United States
- 37.663219°N 97.533478°W

Information
- School type: Public, High School
- Established: 2011
- School board: Board Website
- School district: Goddard USD 265
- CEEB code: 171120
- Principal: Todd Hague
- Teaching staff: 58.30 (FTE)
- Grades: 9 to 12
- Gender: coed
- Enrollment: 988 (2023–2024)
- Student to teacher ratio: 16.95
- Hours in school day: 7
- Campus type: Suburban
- Colors: Black; Columbia Blue
- Athletics: Class 5A; District 8
- Athletics conference: AVCTL II
- Sports: Football Volleyball Cross-Country Girls Tennis Boys Basketball Girls basketball Wrestling Boys Tennis Track and Field Baseball Softball Girls Soccer Boys Soccer E-Sports (HSEL)
- Mascot: Tigers
- Team name: (Lady) Tigers
- Communities served: Goddard; West Wichita
- Website: ehs.goddardusd.com

Eisenhower High School is a public secondary school in Goddard, Kansas, United States. It is operated by Goddard USD 265 school district and serves students of grades 9 to 12. The school mascot is the Tiger and the school colors are black and Columbia blue.

== History ==
In 2011, the high school was completed, and was opened for students in August 2011. It is one of twelve schools in the Goddard Unified School District.

== See also ==
- List of high schools in Kansas
- List of unified school districts in Kansas

Other high schools in Goddard USD 265 public school district

- Goddard High School
- Goddard Academy
