= K. C. McDermott =

American football player (born 1996)

No. 62
- Position: Guard

Personal information
- Born: April 18, 1996 (age 30); Palm Beach, Florida, U.S.
- Listed height: 6 ft 5 in (1.96 m)
- Listed weight: 311 lb (141 kg)

Career information
- High school: Wellington (FL) Palm Beach Central
- College: Miami (FL)
- NFL draft: 2018: undrafted

Career history
- Jacksonville Jaguars (2018–2021); New York Giants (2022); Houston Texans (2022)

Awards and highlights
- Third-team All-ACC (2017)

Career NFL statistics
- Games played: 16
- Games started: 1
- Stats at Pro Football Reference

K. C. McDermott (born April 18, 1996) is an American professional football offensive guard. He was signed by the Jacksonville Jaguars as an undrafted free agent in 2018 following his college football career with the Miami Hurricanes.

== Professional career ==
=== Jacksonville Jaguars ===
McDermott signed with the Jacksonville Jaguars as an undrafted free agent following the 2018 NFL draft on April 30, 2018. He was waived during final roster cuts on September 1, 2018, and signed to the team's practice squad the next day.

McDermott signed a futures contract with the Jaguars on December 31, 2018. He suffered an ankle injury in the final 2019 preseason game and was waived/injured during final roster cuts on August 31, 2019. He subsequently reverted to the team's injured reserve list the next day.

McDermott was waived during final roster cuts again on September 5, 2020, and signed to the practice squad on September 7. He was elevated to the active roster on September 24 for the team's week 3 game against the Miami Dolphins, and reverted to the practice squad after the game. He was elevated again on October 3 for the week 4 game against the Cincinnati Bengals, and reverted to the practice squad again following the game. He was placed on the practice squad/COVID-19 list by the team on October 17, 2020, and was activated back to the practice squad on November 4. He was signed to the active roster on November 14, 2020.

On August 31, 2021, McDermott was waived by the Jaguars and re-signed to the practice squad the next day. He was promoted to the active roster on October 29, 2021.

On August 29, 2022, McDermott was released by the Jaguars.

=== New York Giants ===
On September 12, 2022, the New York Giants signed McDermott to their practice squad. On September 20, 2022, he was released.

=== Houston Texans ===
On October 11, 2022, McDermott was signed to the Houston Texans practice squad.

== Personal life ==
McDermott's brother Shane played college football for Miami and spent two seasons in the NFL. Both him and his brother are from Lake Worth Beach, Florida.
