= Lake Afton =

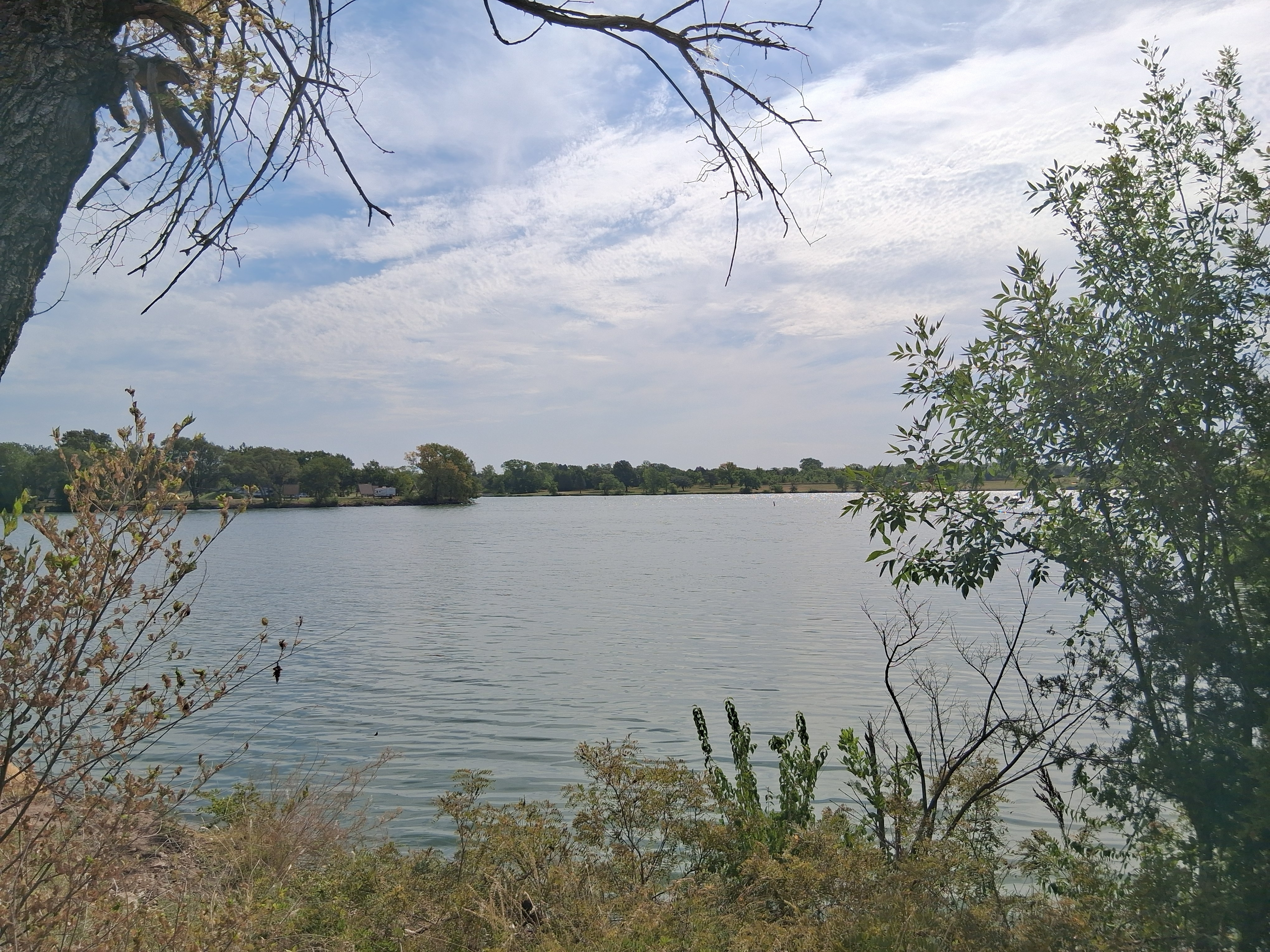
- Lake Afton in 2026

- Location within Kansas Location within the United States

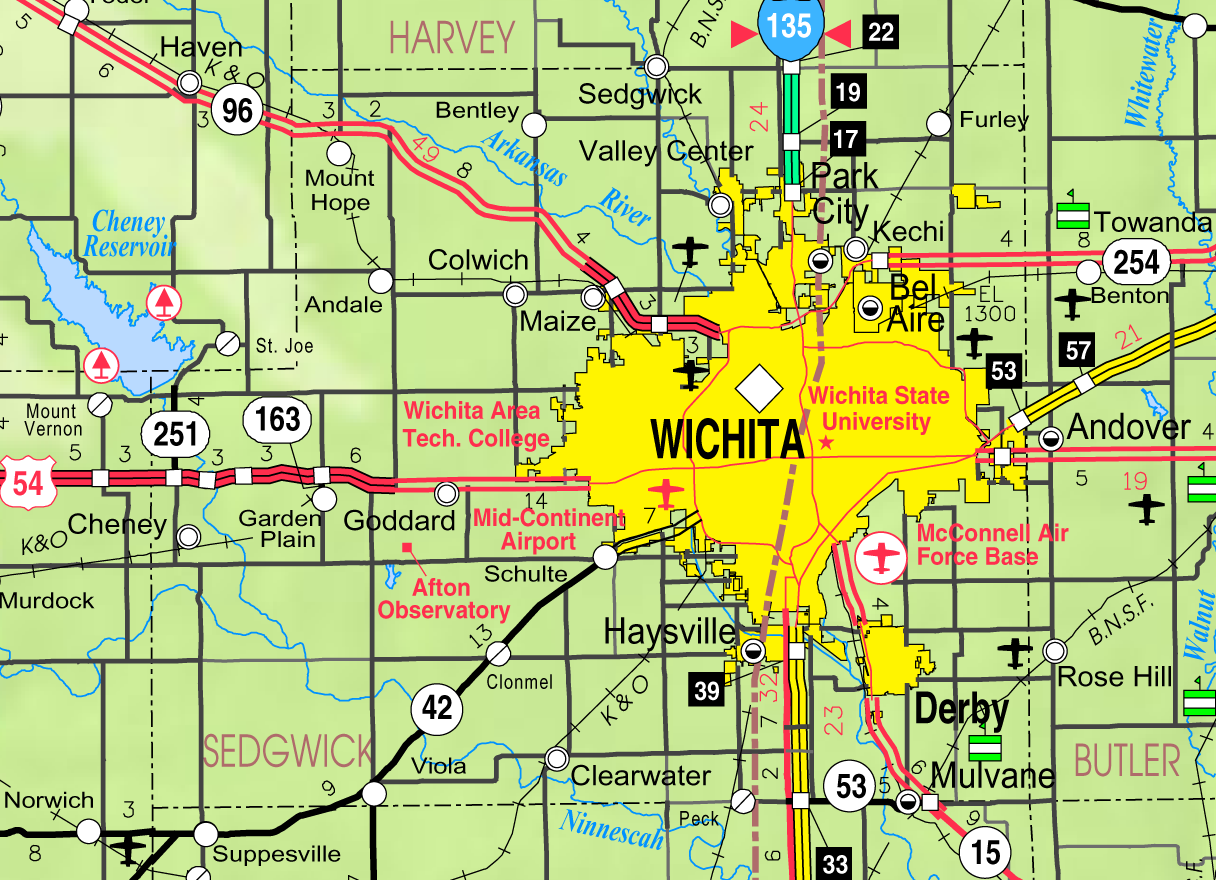
- KDOT map of Sedgwick County (legend)
- Location: Sedgwick County, Kansas
- Coordinates: 37°36′41″N 97°37′38″W
- Type: Lake
- Basin countries: United States
- Built: 1941
- First flooded: 1945
- Surface area: 258-acre (104 ha)
- Surface elevation: 1,365 ft (416 m)
- Settlements: Goddard, Schulte, Garden Plain, Viola

Lake Afton is a 258-acre (104 ha) man-made recreational lake in Sedgwick County, Kansas, United States, and within the 720-acre (2.9 km^{2}) Lake Afton Park. It is located east of the intersection of Viola Rd (263rd St W) and MacArthur Rd (39th St S), between the communities of Goddard, Garden Plain, Schulte, Viola.

== History ==
Ground breaking for the dam occurred on December 29, 1939. The dam was built by Works Progress Administration workers from 1939 to 1941. It opened to the public in 1945.

The Sedgwick County Commission let a contract for the construction of the Segwick County Boys Detention Home within the Park in April 1960.

Lake Afton Public Observatory was constructed within the Park in the late 1970s on the north side of MacArthur Rd.

== Directions ==
Lake Afton is located at 24600 W 39th St S, which is east of the intersection of Viola Rd (263rd St W) and MacArthur Rd (39th St S) in rural western Sedgwick County. MacArthur Rd is located 3 miles (4.8 km) south of U.S. Route 54 / U.S. Route 400 highway.

Directions:

- from Goddard, 3 miles (4.8 km) west on U.S. Route 54, 3 miles (4.8 km) south on Viola Rd, 0.7 miles (1.1 km) east on MacArthur Rd.
- from Garden Plain, 2 miles (3.2 km) east on U.S. Route 54, 3 miles (4.8 km) south on Viola Rd, 0.7 miles (1.1 km) east on MacArthur Rd.
- from Schulte and K-42, 8.7 miles (14.0 km) west on MacArthur Rd.
- from Viola and K-42, 9 miles (14 km) north on Viola Rd, 0.7 miles (1.1 km) east on MacArthur Rd.

== See also ==
- Cheney Reservoir, northwest of Lake Afton
- List of Kansas state parks
- List of lakes, reservoirs, and dams in Kansas
- List of rivers of Kansas
