= Lake Afton Public Observatory =

Observatory in Kansas, US

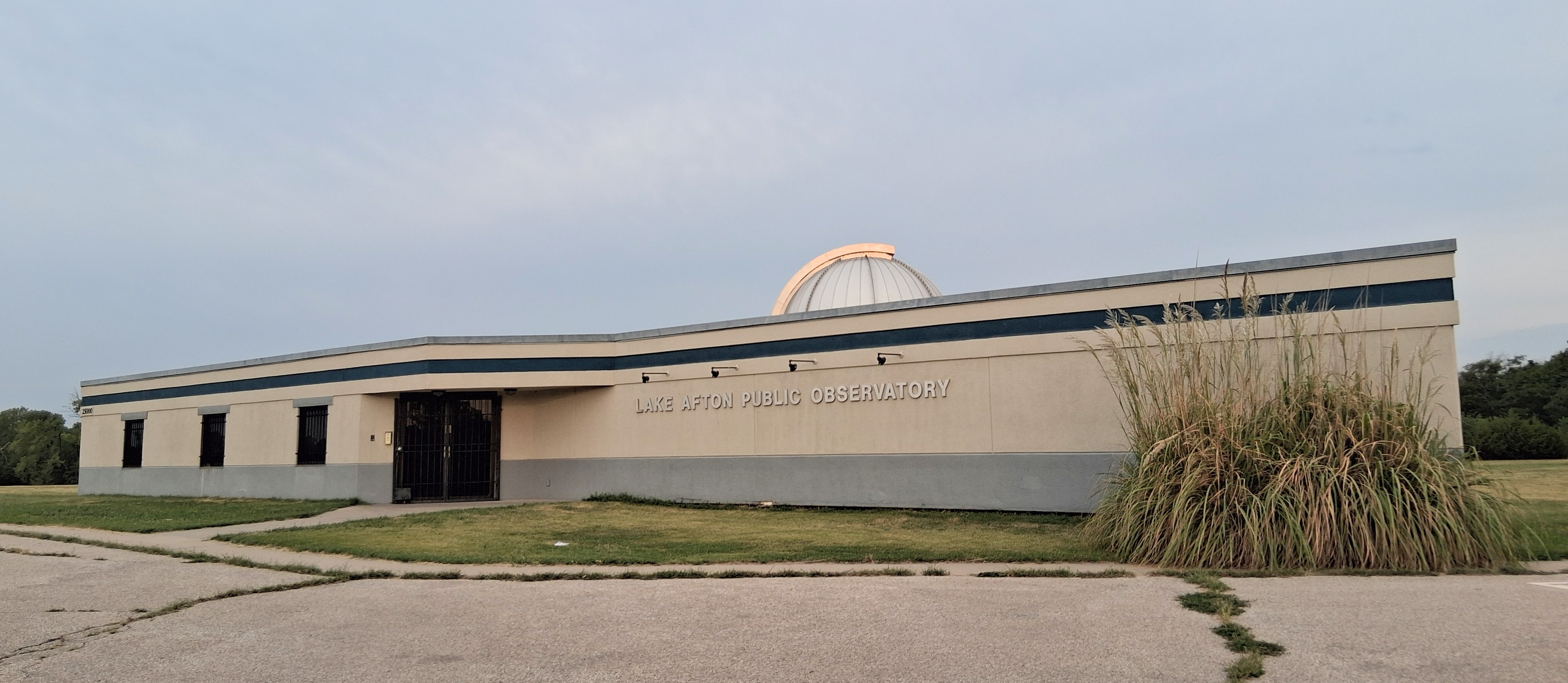
- The observatory in 2026
- Organization: Lake Afton Public Observatory
- Location: Sedgwick County, Kansas, U.S.
- Coordinates: 37.6222°N 97.6269°W
- Website: LakeAfton.com

Telescopes
- Unnamed telescope: 16-inch reflector

Lake Afton Public Observatory (LAPO) is an astronomical observatory located southwest of Wichita, Kansas, in a rural area of Sedgwick County on the north side of Lake Afton. At the heart of the observatory is a 16-inch (410 mm) F/13 Ritchey–Chrétien telescope along with a piggyback mounted 6-inch (150 mm) F/8 apochromatic refractor. The facility also features an exhibit room filled with educational material on stargazing, the physics of light, and the history of Astronomy. There is also an observing area to the north of the building for local astronomers to set up their own telescopes. The observatory offers programs for the public every weekend throughout the year along with various private, and school programs throughout the week.

== History ==
It was established in 1979 through the cooperation and support of Sedgwick County, the City of Wichita, and Wichita State University's Fairmount Center for Science and Mathematics Education. The Observatory was operated by Wichita State University's Fairmount Center with additional funds from Sedgwick County for facilities.

In June 2015 Wichita State University announced they were closing the observatory on August 22, 2015, as the school could no longer justify its expense.

Local astronomers began working with city officials and Wichita State University in order to reopen the observatory as a non-profit group. On June 29, The Wichita Eagle reported that an agreement between the city, Wichita State, and the Kansas Astronomical Observers had been reached and that the observatory would reopen over Labor Day weekend of 2016.

The observatory reopened to the public on September 2, 2016.

== Location ==
The observatory is located at 25000 West 39th St. South (a.k.a. MacArthur Road), southwest of Goddard, Kansas. It is a rural area on the north side of Lake Afton.

Driving directions from the interchange at I-235 and US-54/US-400 (a.k.a. Kellogg): 13 miles west on US-54/US-400, then 3 miles south on 263rd St. W, then 0.8 miles east on 39th St. S (a.k.a. MacArthur), observatory is located on the north side of the road.

== See also ==
- List of observatories
