= Goddard, Kansas =

City in Sedgwick County, Kansas

- City
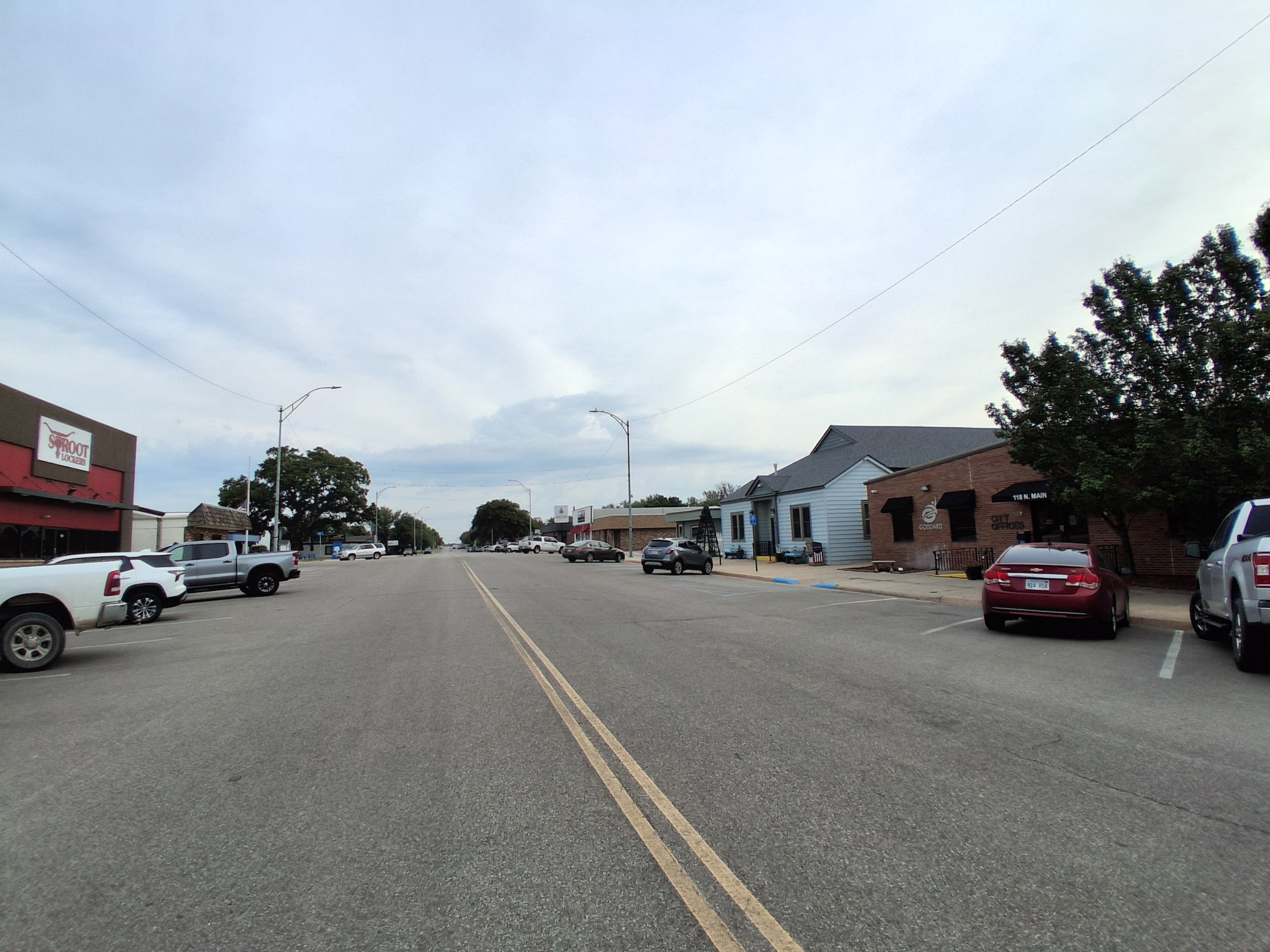
- Downtown Goddard in 2026

- Location within Sedgwick County and Kansas
- Interactive map of Goddard, Kansas
- Coordinates: 37°39′35″N 97°34′27″W
- Country: United States
- State: Kansas
- County: Sedgwick
- Founded: 1883
- Incorporated: 1910
- Named for: J.F. Goddard

Government
  - Mayor: George Liebe
  - City Administrator: Craig Crosset

Area
  - Total: 4.96 sq mi (12.84 km^{2})
  - Land: 4.90 sq mi (12.70 km^{2})
  - Water: 0.054 sq mi (0.14 km^{2})
- Elevation: 1,463 ft (446 m)

Population (2020)
  - Total: 5,084
  - Density: 1,037/sq mi (400.3/km^{2})
- Time zone: UTC-6 (CST)
  - Summer (DST): UTC-5 (CDT)
- ZIP Code: 67052
- Area code: 316
- FIPS code: 20-26725
- GNIS ID: 474001
- Website: goddardks.gov

Goddard (/ˈɡɑːdərd/ GAH-dərd) is a city in Sedgwick County, Kansas, United States, and a western suburb of Wichita. As of the 2020 census, the population of the city was 5,084.

== History ==
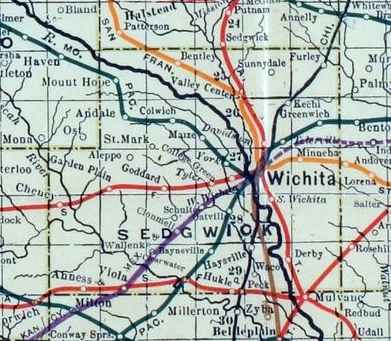
1915 railroad map of Sedgwick County

In 1883, Ezekiel Wilder purchased farmland on the planned railway of the Atchison, Topeka, and Santa Fe Railway south of Blendon, Kansas, approximately 10 miles (16 km) west of Wichita. There, he established the town of Goddard in honor of J. F. Goddard, former third vice-president of the ATSF Railway. The railroad reached Goddard in 1884, and a post office was established there the same year. Several buildings were relocated from Blendon, including the town hall and the planned Methodist church. Goddard was officially incorporated in 1910.

On June 23, 1969, an F4 tornado struck Goddard. No fatalities occurred, but six people were injured.

In recent decades as Wichita has expanded westward, a growing number of commuters have settled in Goddard, transforming it from a rural agricultural community into a suburb.

== Geography ==
Goddard is located at 37°39′35″N 97°34′27″W (37.659706, -97.574271) at an elevation of 1,463 feet (446 m). Goddard lies on U.S. Route 54 in south-central Kansas, immediately west of Wichita.

The community lies approximately 12 miles (19 km) southwest of the Arkansas River and 8 miles (13 km) north-northeast of the Ninnescah River in the Wellington-McPherson Lowlands region of the Great Plains.

According to the United States Census Bureau, the city has a total area of 4.49 square miles (11.63 km^{2}), of which 4.43 square miles (11.47 km^{2}) is land and 0.06 square miles (0.16 km^{2}) is water.

== Demographics ==
Historical population
Census	Pop.	Note	%±
1890	210		—
1900	225		7.1%
1910	225		0.0%
1920	255		13.3%
1930	255		0.0%
1940	248		−2.7%
1950	274		10.5%
1960	533		94.5%
1970	955		79.2%
1980	1,427		49.4%
1990	1,804		26.4%
2000	2,037		12.9%
2010	4,344		113.3%
2020	5,084		17.0%
2023 (est.)	5,708		12.3%
U.S. Decennial Census; 2010-2020

Goddard is part of the Wichita metropolitan area, Kansas.

=== 2020 census ===
As of the 2020 census, Goddard had a population of 5,084, with 1,662 households and 1,313 families. The population density was 997.3 per square mile (385.0/km^{2}). There were 1,757 housing units at an average density of 344.6 per square mile (133.1/km^{2}).

The median age was 32.5 years. 33.5% of residents were under the age of 18 and 10.9% were 65 years of age or older. 6.9% of residents were from 18 to 24, 28.6% were from 25 to 44, and 20.1% were from 45 to 64. For every 100 females there were 97.8 males, and for every 100 females age 18 and over there were 90.4 males age 18 and over.

95.2% of residents lived in urban areas, while 4.8% lived in rural areas.

There were 1,662 households, of which 51.7% had children under the age of 18 living in them. Of all households, 61.3% were married-couple households, 13.3% were households with a male householder and no spouse or partner present, and 19.9% were households with a female householder and no spouse or partner present. About 18.2% of all households were made up of individuals and 8.1% had someone living alone who was 65 years of age or older. The average household size was 3.3 and the average family size was 4.0.

There were 1,757 housing units, of which 5.4% were vacant. The homeowner vacancy rate was 2.0% and the rental vacancy rate was 10.1%.

Racial composition as of the 2020 census
Race	Number	Percent
White	4,313	84.8%
Black or African American	60	1.2%
American Indian and Alaska Native	37	0.7%
Asian	55	1.1%
Native Hawaiian and Other Pacific Islander	0	0.0%
Some other race	91	1.8%
Two or more races	528	10.4%
Hispanic or Latino (of any race)	429	8.4%

=== Educational attainment ===
The percent of those with a bachelor's degree or higher was estimated to be 18.5% of the population.

=== Income and poverty ===
The 2016–2020 5-year American Community Survey estimates show that the median household income was $82,270 (with a margin of error of +/- $12,964) and the median family income was $93,393 (+/- $15,884). Males had a median income of $54,132 (+/- $5,208) versus $26,447 (+/- $8,232) for females. The median income for those above 16 years old was $41,250 (+/- $3,090). Approximately, 0.8% of families and 1.7% of the population were below the poverty line, including 1.9% of those under the age of 18 and 3.1% of those ages 65 or over.

=== 2010 census ===
As of the 2010 United States census, there were 4,344 people, 1,442 households, and 1,124 families residing in the city. The population density was 979.5 inhabitants per square mile (378.2/km^{2}). There were 1,542 housing units at an average density of 347.7 per square mile (134.2/km^{2}). The racial makeup of the city was 91.5% White, 1.2% Asian, 0.9% African American, 0.8% American Indian, 2.6% from other races, and 3.1% from two or more races. Hispanics and Latinos of any race were 6.4% of the population.

There were 1,442 households, of which 49.5% had children under the age of 18 living with them, 63.5% were married couples living together, 9.8% had a female householder with no husband present, 4.6% had a male householder with no wife present, and 22.1% were non-families. 18.5% of all households were made up of individuals, and 5.4% had someone living alone who was 65 years of age or older. The average household size was 2.98, and the average family size was 3.44.

The median age in the city was 29.5 years. 35.1% of residents were under the age of 18; 6.7% were between the ages of 18 and 24; 33.4% were from 25 to 44; 18.1% were from 45 to 64; and 6.7% were 65 years of age or older. The gender makeup of the city was 48.9% male and 51.1% female.

The median income for a household in the city was $65,139, and the median income for a family was $66,533. Males had a median income of $51,058 versus $33,542 for females. The per capita income for the city was $22,095. About 3.7% of families and 5.0% of the population were below the poverty line, including 5.1% of those under age 18 and 7.1% of those age 65 or over.

== Economy ==
As of 2012, 75.9% of the population over the age of 16 was in the labor force. 0.5% was in the armed forces, and 75.3% was in the civilian labor force with 70.4% being employed and 5.0% unemployed. The composition, by occupation, of the employed civilian labor force was: 40.3% in management, business, science, and arts; 22.5% in sales and office occupations; 17.1% in service occupations; 11.6% in production, transportation, and material moving; and 8.4% in natural resources, construction, and maintenance. The three industries employing the largest percentages of the working civilian labor force were: manufacturing (22.7%); educational services, health care, and social assistance (20.9%); and retail trade (12.4%).

The cost of living in Goddard is relatively low; compared to a U.S. average of 100, the cost of living index for the city is 84.5. As of 2012, the median home value in the city was $140,400, the median selected monthly owner cost was $1,341 for housing units with a mortgage and $373 for those without, and the median gross rent was $1,013.

== Government ==
Goddard is a city of the second class with a hybrid Council-Manager form of government. The city council consists of five council members and establish the policies and legislation of the city with the mayor acting as the presiding city council member of city council meetings. The city council meets twice a month.

=== 2023 controversy ===
In 2023, there was a controversy over ex-mayor Hunter Larkin, at that time a council person, engineering a council vote to regain his mayor position.

== Education ==
=== Primary and secondary education ===
Goddard USD 265 operates twelve schools in and around the city:

- Amelia Earhart Elementary School (Grades K–4)
- Clark Davidson Elementary School (K–4)
- Explorer Elementary School (K–4)
- Oak Street Elementary School (K–4)
- Apollo Elementary School (K–4)
- Challenger Intermediate School (5–6)
- Discovery Intermediate School (5–6)
- Eisenhower Middle School (7–8)
- Goddard Middle School (7–8)
- Eisenhower High School (9–12)
- Goddard High School (9–12)
- Goddard Academy (9–12)

The Roman Catholic Diocese of Wichita operates one Catholic school in Goddard: Holy Spirit Catholic School (Pre-K–8).

=== Libraries ===
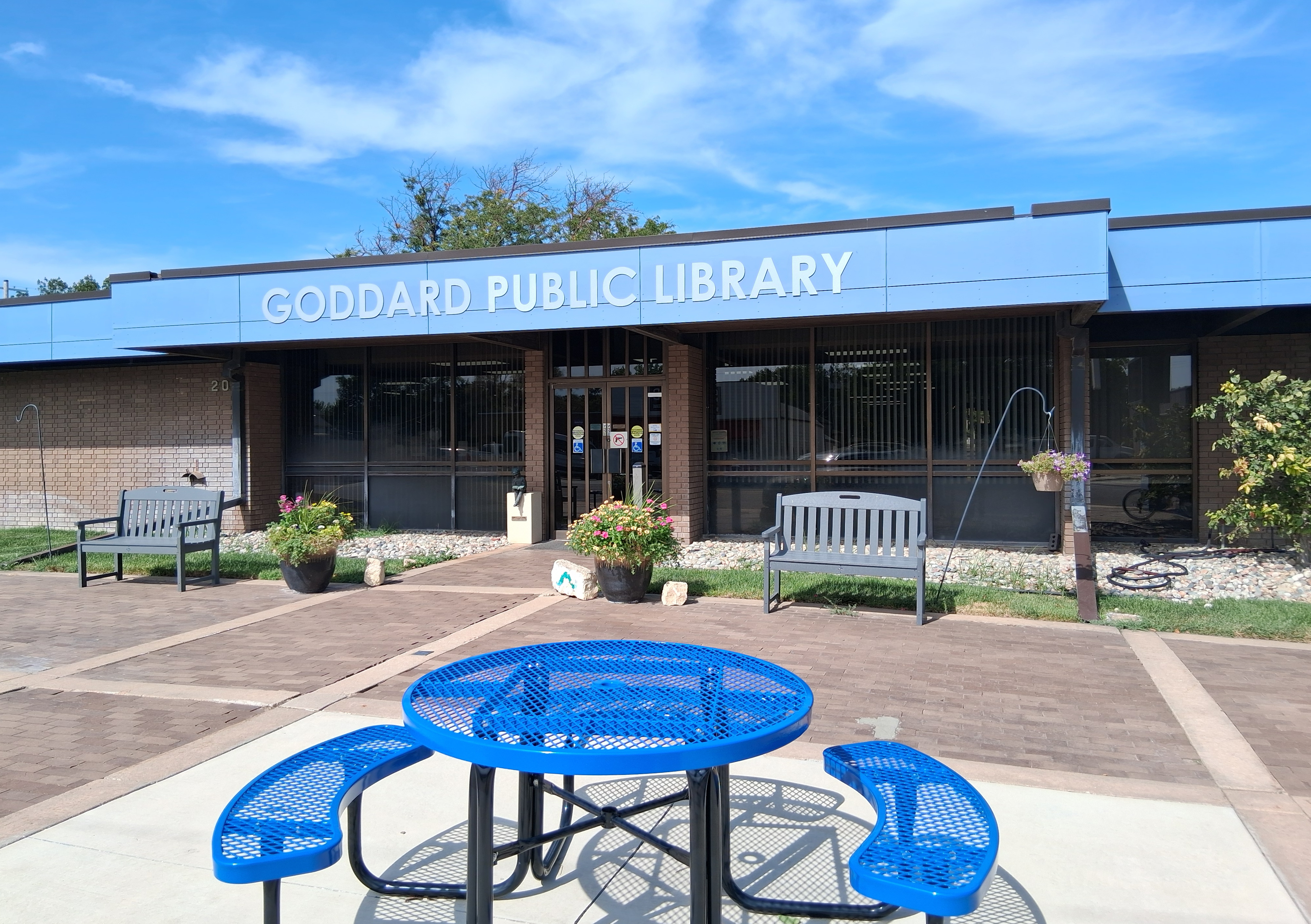
Goddard Public Library in 2026

The Goddard Public Library, located downtown, has a collection of over 19000 volumes and offers technology services and literacy programs to the public. The library was created in March 1969 by the Goddard Woman's Club. In 1985 a new library building was constructed after a bond issue passed. The land for this building was donated to the city by the Goddard School District. This building is currently owned by the school district and serves as its conference center. The library is located at 201 N. Main Street. In 2019 the library board hired its first director holding an MLS, who then hired the library's first Programming & Outreach Specialist. This began a time of incredible outreach services and growth of the library. In 2020 the COVID-19 pandemic hit. This caused a six-week mandatory shutdown, and the library began offering virtual programming. Because of the tireless efforts of staff throughout the pandemic, the library increased its patronage. This led to the library exceeding its 2019 circulation statistics by the end of 2021, a feat that not many public libraries achieved. In August 2021, after receiving an ARPA grant from the State Library of Kansas and IMLS, the library purchased a 2006 RV which was gutted and repurposed into a mobile library. The Goddard Public Mobile Library went into service in October 2022, increasing access to library services, programs, and information within the 65 square miles of the school district and other parts of West Wichita.

== Infrastructure ==
=== Transportation ===
U.S. Route 54 and U.S. Route 400 run concurrently east-west through Goddard.

The Atchison, Topeka and Santa Fe Railway formerly provided passenger rail service to Goddard on a line between Wichita and Pratt. Dedicated passenger service was provided until at least 1926, while mixed trains continued until at least 1961. As of 2025, the nearest passenger rail station is located in Newton, where Amtrak's Southwest Chief stops once daily on a route from Chicago to Los Angeles.

=== Utilities ===
The city government's Public Works Department is responsible for both water provision and waste water management. Westar Energy provides electric power. Most residents use natural gas for heating fuel; service is provided by Kansas Gas Service.

== Media ==
Goddard is in both the Wichita radio and television markets.

== Parks and recreation ==
The city government maintains two parks in the community, Linear Park and Means Memorial Park, as well as a municipal swimming pool.

== Culture ==
=== Events ===
Goddard's Chamber of Commerce, Lions Clubs International Lions Club, Goddard Public Library, and the City of Goddard organize and promote many community events throughout the year, including a Lions Club Car show/Easter Egg Hunt, Neighbors United, Garage Sale Day, Independence Day Firework Display, National Night Out, Fall Festival, Goddard Community Gatherings, Community Thanksgiving Feast, StoryTime with Santa, and Christmas on Main Street.

=== Points of interest ===
Lake Afton Public Observatory, a volunteer-run Observatory open to the public on weekend nights, is located south of Goddard.

Tanganyika Wildlife Park, a privately owned zoo specializing in the breeding of endangered species. The Park is open year-round.

Blast Off Bay Water Park, located next to the Genesis Sports Complex and Hampton Inn.

== Notable people ==
Notable individuals who were born in and/or have lived in Goddard include:

- Derek Norris (born 1989), baseball catcher
- Ed Siever (1875–1920), baseball pitcher
- Todd Tiahrt (born 1951), U.S. Representative from Kansas
- Logan Watkins (born 1989), baseball second baseman

== See also ==
- Lake Afton
