= Goddard High School (Kansas) =

Location
- 2500 South 199th Street West; Goddard, Kansas 67052; United States
- Coordinates: 37.64700°N 97.56866°W

Information
- School type: Public, High School
- School board: Board Website
- School district: Goddard USD 265
- CEEB code: 171125
- Principal: Doug Bridwell
- Staff: 52.30 (FTE)
- Grades: 9 to 12
- Enrollment: 1,005 (2023–2024)
- Student to teacher ratio: 19.22
- Campus: Urban
- Colors: Blue and White
- Athletics: 5A, Ark Valley Chisholm Trail Division 1
- Mascot: Lion
- Rival: Eisenhower High School
- Accreditation: Blue Ribbon 2012.
- Website: ghs.goddardusd.com

Goddard High School is a public high school located in Goddard, Kansas, United States. It is operated by Goddard USD 265 school district and serves students in grades 9 to 12. It is one of two high schools located within the city limits of Goddard. The school colors are blue and white. The enrollment for the 2009–2010 school year is approximately 1,600 students, before the Goddard/Eisenhower split. After the split in 2011, the enrollment has been around 800. Goddard High School was selected as a Blue Ribbon School in 2012.

Goddard High is a member of the Kansas State High School Activities Association and offers a variety of sports programs. Athletic teams compete in the 'Ark Valley Chisholm Trail League' in the 5A division and are known as the "Lions". Extracurricular activities are also offered in the form of performing arts, school publications, and clubs.

== Academics ==
In 2012, Goddard High School was selected as a Blue Ribbon School. The Blue Ribbon Award recognizes public and private schools which perform at high levels or have made significant academic improvements.

== Extracurricular activities ==
The Lions compete in the Ark Valley Chisholm Trail League and are classified as a 5A school. Throughout its history, Goddard has won several state championships in various sports. Several graduates have gone on to participate in collegiate athletics.

=== Athletics ===
Its baseball team has 3 players currently in the minor leagues. The wrestling team has been nationally ranked, winning the state championship in 1999, 2006, 2008, 2009, 2010, 2015, 2016, 2017, 2018, 2019, 2020, 2021, and 2024. The Lions also finished runner-up in 2007 and 2014.

=== State championships ===
State Championships
Season	Sport	Number of Championships	Year
Fall	Soccer, Boys	2	1991, 2002
Fall	Cross Country, Boys	1	1998
Winter	Wrestling	13	1999, 2006, 2008, 2009, 2010, 2015, 2016, 2017, 2018, 2019, 2020, 2021, 2024
Winter	Basketball, Boys	1	1964
Winter	Bowling, Boys	1	2009
Spring	Tennis, Boys	2	2001, 2002
Spring	Baseball	1	2004
Total		21	

=== Music ===
The Goddard High School's band program has traveled nationwide and has accumulated numerous awards for its marching band, symphonic winds, symphonic band, full and string orchestra, and two jazz bands.

== Notable alumni ==
- Travis Banwart, professional baseball player
- Jeff Berblinger, professional baseball player
- Derek Norris, professional baseball player
- Logan Watkins, professional baseball player

== See also ==
- List of high schools in Kansas
- List of unified school districts in Kansas

Other high schools in same school district

- Eisenhower High School
- Goddard Academy
